= Kelly Green (musician) =

Australian singer (born 1947)

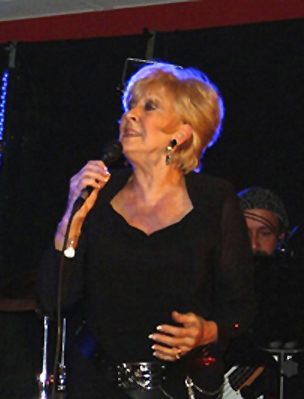
- Kelly Green in concert in 2011.

Background information
- Born: Elaine Annette Sherratt; 20 July 1947 (age 79)
- Origin: England
- Genres: Rock & roll
- Occupation: singer
- Years active: 1958–present
- Label: CBS

Kelly Green (born Elaine Annette Sherratt, 20 July 1947) is an Australian singer. Born in the United Kingdom, she migrated to Australia in 1956, and her singing career began in Sydney at the age of 15. Green grew up in a musical family – her father, Norman Sherratt, was a guitarist and her older twin sisters, Christine and Norma, were also singers. In the early 1960s Green appeared regularly on popular Australian music television shows, Bandstand, Six O'Clock Rock, and Sing, Sing, Sing, building a fan base. During April and May 1968, Green was the lead singer for the first Perth-based entertainment troupe to visit allied forces in Vietnam during the war there.

== Biography ==
Elaine Annette Sherratt (later known as Kelly Green) was born on 20 July 1947 in the United Kingdom. Her father, Norman Douglas Sherratt (born 16 January 1922), and her mother, Lillian Margaret (born 10 January 1921) also had twin daughters Christine Ann and Norma Lillian (both born 4 August 1944) and a fourth daughter, Carol Lyn (born 12 March 1955). In 1956 Green and her family migrated to Australia. By 1957 the family had settled in Perth, where Green attended Rosalie Primary School and Hollywood High School. Norman played guitar for gypsy and country and western music – his band was sometimes joined by Lillian on vocals. The twins, Christine and Norma, were local singers. Green left school at the age of 14 years to work at a deli, and, with her father's musical backing, she recorded a demo tape. Pop singer and entertainer, Ian Turpie, was in Perth performing in a musical, Bye Bye Birdie, and recommended Green to send a tape to Sydney-based music TV show, Bandstand. The following year, at the age of 15 years, she flew to Sydney – staying with family friends – and began her singing career on Bandstand. After her first appearance on the show Green signed with Coronet Records and was managed by Sven Libaek. This led to Green's appearance on other TV music shows, Six O'Clock Rock and Sing, Sing, Sing, thereby building her fan base.

In January 1963 Green issued her debut single, "I'll Never Be the Same"/"Little Girl Lost" – which was one of the first 7-inch singles issued on CBS Records – which had taken over Coronet Records – by an Australian artist. According to The Australian Women's Weekly's Ainslie Baker, Green's "Little Girl Lost" is "a slow romantic ballad, and [she] sings it sweetly". However, Baker found "I'll Never Be The Same" to have "real teen appeal ... [t]he lyrics are cute and [Green] sounds cuter". To promote the single, Green toured to Brisbane and Melbourne for TV appearances. In between touring, Green was taking dancing lessons and studying singing and musical appreciation at the Sydney Conservatorium. In September 1963 Green issued "So What", she was backed by surf rockers The Atlantics.

In 1964, Green married fellow rock and roll singer and Bandstand regular, Barry Stanton, with whom she had two children – a son and a daughter – before divorcing shortly thereafter. The B-side of her third single "Tell Me That You Love Me Too" is written by Stanton. In July to August 1964, Green and Stanton supported English rock and roll entertainer Screaming Lord Sutch's tour of Australia alongside Billy Thorpe & The Aztecs, Digger Revell and Laurel Lea. After her marriage ended in 1965, Green returned to Perth. Though a single mother of two, her career continued with local TV appearances on Telethon. In April and May 1968, Kelly was lead vocalist for the first Western Australian entertainment troupe to visit Vietnam during the war.

Over her career, Green toured with various Australian artists including, The Bee Gees, Billy Thorpe & The Aztecs, Digger Revell, Laurel Lea, Col Joye & the Joy Boys, Dig Richards, Lonnie Lee, and The Delltones. In 1999, Green was inducted into the Rock and roll Council of Western Australia's Hall of Fame, making her the first female in the state to be nominated. As of 2011 Green resides in Perth, where, in April 2012, she performed alongside Brenton Fosdike in Diamond: The Neil Diamond Tribute Show. She hosts a radio program on Capital Radio 101.7FM playing rock and roll tracks from the 1950s and 1960s.

== Discography ==
=== Singles ===
- "I'll Never Be the Same"/"Little Girl Lost" (1963)
- "So What" (Kelly Green with The Atlantics)/"Love Me with All Your Heart" (1963)
- "Do You ?"/"Tell Me That You Love Me Too" (1964)
