= The Crescents =

Vocal music group of 1950s and '60s Australia

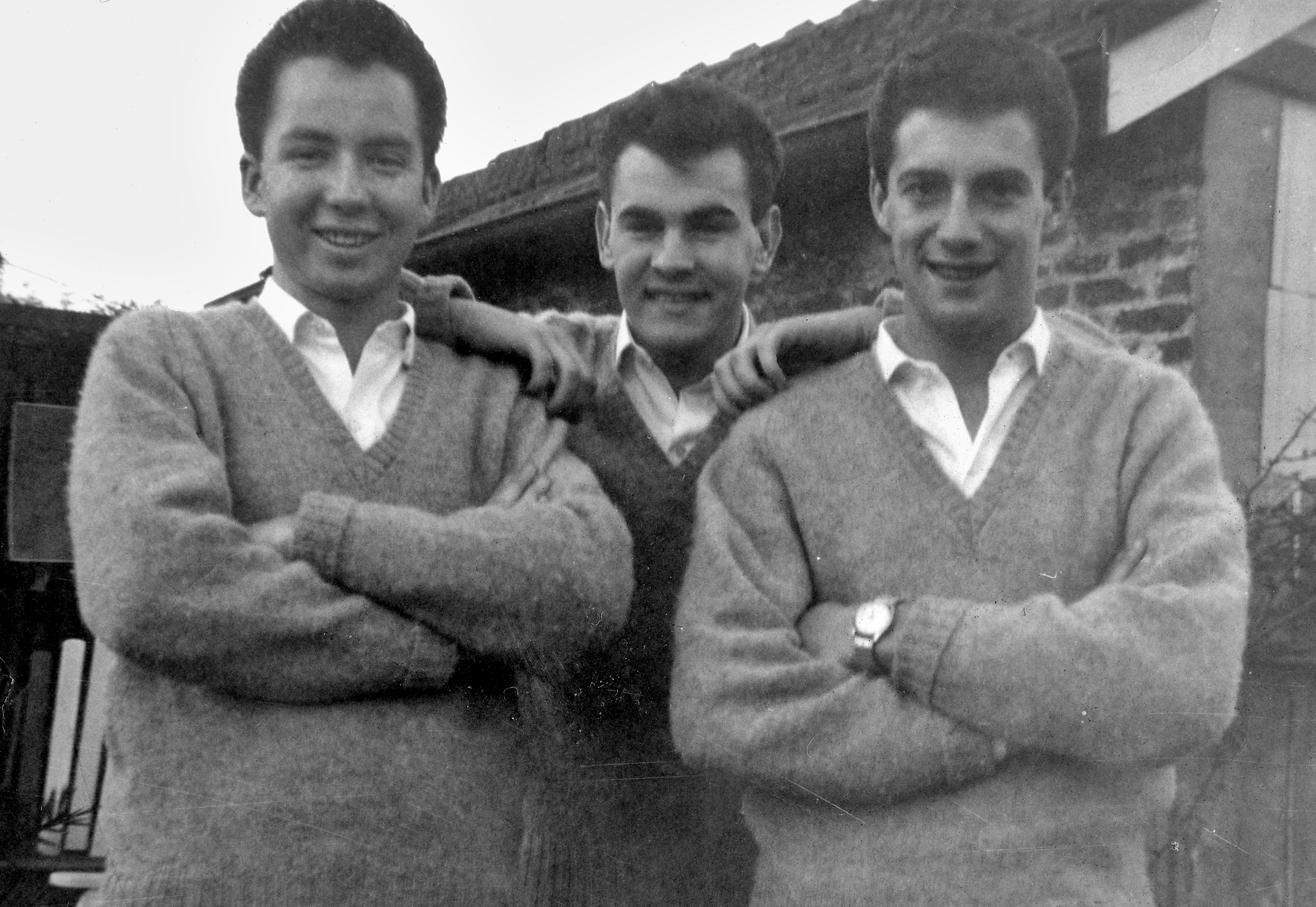
- Left to right: Mike Downes, Col Loughnan and Kel Palace

Background information
- Also known as: The 4 Tops
- Origin: Sydney, New South Wales, Australia
- Genres: Vocal harmony, pop, doo wop
- Years active: 1958–1962
- Labels: Leedon, Lee Gordon
- Past members: Col Loughnan; Mike Downes; Dennis O'Keefe; Kel Palace; Alan Roberts

The Crescents were an Australian vocal harmony group which formed in Sydney in late 1958 under the name The 4 Tops (not associated with American quartet, the Four Tops). The Crescents were best known for their Top 10 hit "Mr. Blue" and for their tours with Lee Gordon's "Big Shows" supporting Johnnie Ray, Fabian, and Ricky Nelson.

Dennis O'Keefe, Kel Palace, Mike Downes, and Col Loughnan formed The 4 Tops, however a few months later O'Keefe left, and the remaining trio changed their name to The Crescents. Johnny O'Keefe became their manager, and promoted his young vocalists with live performances, appearances on his television program, "Six O'Clock Rock", in print media, and by signing them to Leedon Records. O'Keefe used his connection with Gordon to secure inclusion in the Big Shows. This move paid dividends when the audiences showed strong appreciation, in particular teenage girls.

The Crescents released seven singles, and two EPs, with "Mr. Blue" reaching the Top 10 in Melbourne, Sydney, and Brisbane, their only hit record. In 1962, Downes left the group, followed later the same year by Loughnan, who joined the Delltones. Shortly thereafter, the group disbanded.

== History ==
=== Formation ===
Mike Downes, Col Loughnan, and Dennis O'Keefe attended Marist Brothers College, Randwick, where Downes and Loughnan sang in the school choir. They were joined by Kel Palace, (Note: real name: Kel Palise) who lived near O'Keefe, to form a vocal quartet, The 4 Tops. American vocal quartet, the Four Tops, were unknown in Australia at the time, and gained international recognition in 1964 with "Baby I Need Your Loving". The 4 Tops were regular performers, in late 1958, at the Leichhardt Police Boys Club dances, run by Johnny O'Keefe (no relation to Dennis O'Keefe).

In a matter of months, Dennis O'Keefe left the group to sign up for the Air Force, and the remaining trio changed their name to The Crescents. Johnny O'Keefe (widely known as J.O.K.) generously gave help, and advice to the young vocalists, as he had done for so many other young artists. He became their manager. Loughnan recalled that "he was very big on grooming, looking good and moving well. He taught us a lot. [He was] a great guy, ... [but he] would accept nothing less than professionalism from those he worked with." O'Keefe invited The Crescents to the "sheer terror" of performing live on television for the first time on his program "Six O'Clock Rock" on 7 March 1959. The group's first foray was a success, and lead to more television appearances.

In popular music in the 50s, each performer had a specific task, and was expected to carry out only that task. The featured singer often didn't play an instrument, backing instrumentalists were not permitted to sing, and vocal harmony groups did just vocals, backing a big-name singer or on their own. Artists who attempted to cross over often faced a reprimand from their manager. As singers, The Crescents didn't play instruments, but specialised in vocal harmony, with Loughnan as lead singer, Palace singing tenor, and Downes as the baritone. For some of their performances, they provided harmonies for O'Keefe or performed on their own, with O'Keefe's backing band, The Dee Jays present in both cases.

The Crescents practised and worked on their arrangements at Palace's parents' house, with Loughnan on the piano. The group was influenced by The Diamonds, Danny & the Juniors, The Ames Brothers, and The Mills Brothers among others. Several more appearances on "Six O'Clock Rock", and more live performances created a fan base which promoter Lee Gordon couldn't ignore, signing The Crescents to his Leedon recording label.

=== Lee Gordon's Big Shows ===
A feature of the Australian entertainment scene of this era was the "Big Shows" promoted by Gordon over many years. Each Big Show was a touring party with a North American headline act or acts, and local supporting artists. The Crescents were drafted into a Big Show in August 1959 featuring American singer Johnnie Ray who was often referred to as "Mr. Emotions". Supporting Ray were The Horrie Dargie Quintet, Johnny Rebb and The Rebels, O'Keefe, Shirley Simmons, The Crescents, and the Lee Sisters on a six-day tour of Australian state capitals. Melbourne newspaper, The Age concluded that "O'Keefe almost stole the show", and "of the other supporting artists, The Crescents vocal group were the most popular" in a review of a concert at "The Stadium" (now known as Festival Hall).

The tour allowed the young singers to give notice to quit their jobs. This was a pivotal decision for Loughnan because he never worked outside the music industry again.

Music from The Crescents
Top 10 hit "Mr. Blue" (1959)
Sound sample, featuring Kel Palace (tenor), Col Loughnan (lead), and Mike Downes (baritone).

The Crescents were invited to support Fabian in October 1959 at the Sydney Stadium Big Shows along with O'Keefe, Col Joye, Lonnie Lee, and Johnny Devlin among others. The stadium featured a revolving stage, which turned full circle in about three or four minutes. According to Johnstone, Fabian's biggest asset wasn't his singing ability, but his handsome appearance. Also, The Crescents were reported to be popular with the teenage girls, and all of the Australian support acts attracted positive responses from the audience.

=== Early record releases ===
Leedon released "Everlovin'"/"You Broke My Heart" in October 1959, the trio's first single. The B-side, "You Broke My Heart", was co-written by Loughnan and O'Keefe, and the record received radio airplay without making the charts. This exposure on radio reinforced The Crescents presence on television, in newspapers and magazines, and through live performances. In an interview with TV Week, Palace stated "we have been on 'Six O'Clock Rock' about six or seven times, TCN-9's 'Bandstand' once and ATN-7's 'Teen Time' twice".

The group recorded a cover of the Fleetwoods' hit, "Mr. Blue", written by Dewayne Blackwell, and backed with "How Important Can It Be". Released in December 1959, it became a Top 10 hit, peaking at No. 2 in Brisbane, No. 4 in Melbourne, and No. 8 in Sydney by January 1960, but it was their only chart success. With a hit record, The Crescents became the main competition for the Delltones, but it was quite amiable. The lead singer of the Delltones, Noel Widerberg, said "it was friendly rivalry. We'd get together and jam and sing together at parties".

About 1000 fans packed into the Dispensary Hall in Leichardt for the "Friends of Johnny O'Keefe Club Christmas Swing". The Crescents were invited, and sang backing vocals for some of O'Keefe's songs. O'Keefe performed for more than 90 minutes uninterrupted, one of the longest sets of his career.

"When You Wish upon a Star" backed with "The Hand of God" became the group's third single when it was released in April 1960. However, it didn't replicate the success of Mr. Blue, failing to reach the charts.

=== O'Keefe's car crash ===
O'Keefe was performing on the Queensland Gold Coast, and leaving late in the evening attempted the long drive home to Sydney. On the morning of 27 June 1960, O'Keefe fell asleep while driving, crashing his red 1959 Plymouth Belvedere into a gravel truck just north of Kempsey. The three occupants were severely injured but survived, with O'Keefe suffering severe head, and facial injuries requiring extensive surgery. This had a profound effect on O'Keefe's life. Because O'Keefe was their manager, and mentor, The Crescents had first-hand experience of the changes. In an interview, Loughnan remembered that:

"Johnny changed as a result of that accident and rightfully so. It must have been a terrible thing for a young man ... He was a pretty vain guy and now all of a sudden he had lost his looks."

Also, O'Keefe had a series of highly publicised nervous breakdowns over the next few years. A tour was organised to cover hospital expenses called "The Most Mammoth Rock'n'Roll Show Ever". Convened by Gordon and Alan Heffernan, and featuring almost every well known singer and band in Sydney rock music (including The Crescents), the tour played in Brisbane, Sydney, and Melbourne.

In November 1960, Loughnan (not the driver), Heffernan, Barry Stanton, and Ray Hoff were rounding a bend on a Victorian road, and a tyre blew out. The car rolled down an embankment, but they were able to walk off into the dark with only cuts, and bruises. Loughnan claimed: "I remember having nightmares for years after that. I just hated it."

=== The Ricky Nelson Show ===
The third of the Lee Gordon Big Shows, in which The Crescents were involved, was The Ricky Nelson Show in September 1960. Featuring six concerts at the Sydney Stadium, the bill included O'Keefe, Lee, Joye, Devlin, Dig Richards, and Candy and Mandy. These were the first concerts at which O'Keefe performed after his car accident.

=== More record releases ===
Leedon released Rock Time, an EP covering other artists' songs: "Sorry (I Ran All the Way Home)", "Why Do Fools Fall in Love", previously a hit for Frankie Lymon, "Down by the Riverside" (anonymous), and "Dreaming", written by Loughnan and Palace. Following a poll of Sydney viewers of Six O'Clock Rock rating the most popular artists of 1960, The Crescents placed a respectable fifth behind the top solo singers of the day. (Note: announced 26 November 1960) During 1960, many musicians and singers attended parties at Tom Hart's home, including O'Keefe, Lee, the Delltones, The Crescents, Judy Cannon, Rob EG, and many others. Activities included partying, and standing around the piano singing. This piano also was employed by The Crescents for practising their songs.

The Crescents released "One More Kiss" backed with "Picture of Love" in November 1960 on Lee Gordon Records, followed by "The Stars Will Remember" backed with "Love Love Love" in January 1961, which had been a hit for The Clovers. They chose a religious theme for their sixth single, "The Way of the Cross" backed with "The Story of the Cross" (June 1961). The B-side was narrated by Chris Christensen, with backing vocals from The Crescents. Leedon released the group's second EP, "The Crescents Hit it for Six" which was a compilation of previously released songs. The cover showed the group wearing baseball uniforms, and with baseball bats slung over their shoulders, despite the term "Hit it for Six" being derived from the game of cricket.

=== Decline and disbandment ===
Music from The Crescents
"Silhouettes" (1961), B-side of "Get a Job"
Sound sample, featuring Kel Palace (tenor), Col Loughnan (lead), and Alan Roberts (baritone).

Performing harmony vocals requires almost constant singing practise, and Downes became weary of it. About July 1961, he decided to leave The Crescents, and was replaced by Alan Roberts. The new line-up entered the studio to record "Get a Job"/"Silhouettes", both songs that had been in their live sets for quite some time. However, this was a low period for the trio. In a 1989 interview with Damian Johnstone, Loughnan stated that "morale was down. It wasn't as good or even the same once Mike (Downes) had left". Even so, they continued to work for another year, until events beyond their control changed everything. Their friend, Noel Widerberg, lead singer of the Delltones, died in a car crash at Brighton-Le-Sands, a suburb of Sydney, in July 1962.

Barry Carroll, formerly of the Sapphires, filled in for several gigs during this time but a short time later, another friend from the Delltones, Warren Lucas advocated that Loughnan should be offered the opportunity to become the Delltones lead vocalist. Loughnan later recalled that the change occurred without any animosity. After a short time, the remaining members of the Crescents, Palace and Roberts, decided to disband the group.

== Discography ==
=== Singles ===
List of singles, with Sydney chart positions
Year	A-side	B-side	Peak position	Label	Catalogue
1959	"Everlovin’"	"You Broke My Heart"	84	Leedon	LS565
1959	"Mr. Blue"	"How Important Can It Be?"	7	Leedon	LS581
1960	"When You Wish upon a Star"	"The Hand of God"	—	Lee Gordon	LS598
1960	"One More kiss"	"Picture of Love"	91	Lee Gordon	LS602
1961	"The Stars Will Remember (So Will I)"	"Love, Love, Love"	96	Leedon	LS6056
1961	"Way of the Cross"	"Story of the Cross"	—	Leedon	LK12
1961	"Get a Job "	"Silhouettes"	—	Leedon	LK101

=== EPs ===
List of EPs
Year	EP title	Song title	Label	Catalogue
1960	Rock Time	"Sorry (I Ran All the Way Home)"	Leedon	LEP314
1960	Rock Time	"Why Do Fools Fall in Love"	Leedon	LEP314
1960	Rock Time	"Down by the Riverside"	Leedon	LEP314
1960	Rock Time	"Dreaming"	Leedon	LEP314
1961	Hit it for Six	"Mr. Blue"	Leedon	LEP316
1961	Hit it for Six	"You Broke my Heart"	Leedon	LEP316
1961	Hit it for Six	"Everlovin'"	Leedon	LEP316
1961	Hit it for Six	"Hand of God"	Leedon	LEP316
1961	Hit it for Six	"When You Wish upon a Star"	Leedon	LEP316
1961	Hit it for Six	"How Important Can It Be"	Leedon	LEP316
