= Ted Hamilton =

Australian actor (born 1937)

Ted Hamilton OAM
- Born: Edward Leslie Hamilton; 1937 (age 88–89); Australia
- Occupations: Singer; lyricist; playwright; entrepreneur; actor
- Years active: 1955-2002
- Musical career
- Genres: Jazz, pop
- Labels: Fable Records, ATA Records, EMI Records
- Formerly of: The Bob Gibson Band, Australian All Star Jazz Band, The Australia Jazz Quintet.

Edward Leslie Hamilton (born 1937) is an Australian-born retired Jazz and pop singer-songwriter, actor, playwright and entrepreneur.

He is known for playing the Pirate King in The Pirate Movie and police constable Kevin Dwyer in TV series Division 4 (1969–73).

In 2002, he played Merlin in the TV series Guinevere Jones. He also played in Homicide, The Love Boat, M*A*S*H, The Six Million Dollar Man, Hawaii Five-O, Mission: Impossible, and Rafferty's Rules.

== Biography ==
=== Early career ===
Hamilton began performing in nightclubs in 1955, and live on national radio. He guest-starred on The Ford Show, Calling The Stars and The Gladys Moncrieff Show.

=== Music career ===
Hamilton had hit records with "Primrose Lane" and "The Things We Did Last Summer".

His most successful single was a 1959 duet with the late Ray Melton on His Master's Voice with a cover of US duo Travis and Bob's '59 hit "Tell Him No". Their cover reached #6 in Melbourne, and was a top-20 hit in Sydney, Brisbane and Perth.

Hamilton was the featured singer with The Bob Gibson Band and the Australian All-Stars jazz quintet.

Hamilton guest starred on Australia's first variety show broadcast in 1956 on New Year's Eve on ABC TV. Also in the 1950s, Hamilton featured in music variety shows on all networks, including The Hit Parade and Make Mine Music (ABC), Bandstand (Channel 9), Sydney Tonight (Channel 7), and in the 1960s the seminal variety show Revue 61/62.

Hamilton made his debut as a singer-songwriter and starred with many of the top musicians and groups of the day, including Don Burrows, Terry Wilkinson and Errol Buddle – Bob Gibson's swing band – The Australian Jazz Quintet and The Australian All Stars. He was voted the best singer in jazz and pop by Bandstand and music magazine Downbeat.

=== Television ===
In 1961–62, Hamilton was a regular on the television show Revue 61/62, produced by MCA (America) for the 7 Network. In late 1965, Hamilton compered In Melbourne Tonight on Monday nights on Channel 9.

He provided the voice/image for some of Australia's most popular and successful commercials, such as:

- Craven A, Mac. Robertson Land
- IC-POTA
- Beautiful Rheingold
- Marshall Batteries – Philip Morris (Oh! What a Beauty)
- Coca-Cola
- Kodak
- Louie the fly

He also starred in several variety specials, among them Ted Hamilton and Johnny Farnham – together again for the very first time (June 1973).

== Sports ==
Hamilton was in the World Champion Squash team. He competed for NSW and Australia and Victoria from 1962 to 1970.

== Politics and film career ==
Hamilton starred in Division 4 as Senior Constable Kevin Dwyer, winning best actor and best drama Logie awards. He also performed in a number of national theater productions. Hamilton was founder and chair of the TV-Make it Australian Committee, a lobby group that pushed to have Australian culture represented by local productions on Australian TV stations. The group lobbied the government for delineation of categories for Australian TV in drama, variety, comedy, current affairs, and sport. The group was the most successful lobby group in the history of Australian show business. Hector Crawford, and Prime Minister John Gorton acknowledged Hamilton and the committee as "The man, and the committee that saved Australian drama from extinction".

From 1970 to 1972, Hamilton was the co-convener of the Australia Party. He headed the run for Parliament and his party was successful in having several senators elected. Upon Hamilton's departure for America, the party provided the nucleus of the Australian Democrats, led for many years by Don Chipp. Hamilton was also involved in the "It's Time" campaign, along with Mick Young and Clive Holding.

Hamilton also devised and appeared in a TV commercial for the Philip Morris cigarette brand "Kingford". The commercial won the Logie award for Best TV Commercial in 1974, but resulted in Hamilton's dismissal from "Division 4", as his appearance violated a contract clause specifying that series regulars wouldn't appear in television commercials. He went on to host his own national variety shows on the ABC: Ted Hamilton's New Wave and Ted Hamilton's Musical World. In 1975, because of his chairmanship of the TV-Make It Australian Committee, the doors to Australian commercial television slammed. Hamilton was banned from Channel 9 by Clyde Packer, and informed that he would not be employed by the networks again (he has not been employed by 7 or 9 since). Facing this restriction in a television dominated profession; Hamilton moved his family to the United States and established an acting and corporate career.

In 1980, when Rupert Murdoch attempted to establish a television presence in Australia, he acquired the Ten Channel in Melbourne. He invited Hamilton to return to Australia, to host The Ted Hamilton Show. However, the Broadcasting Control Board opposed his ownership and Murdoch quickly surrendered the idea, and sold his interest. In 1981 Hamilton starred in The Pirate Movie with Christopher Atkins and Kristy McNichol. Hamilton and his partner David Joseph produced The Pirate Movie, the first Australian movie to receive a general release in the United States (2,500 screens 20th Century Fox). Hamilton provided development finance for The Wild Duck (Liv Ullmann and Jeremy Irons) for J. C. Williamson productions, and The Flight of the Navigator for Disney Studios.

== Involvement in United States and return to Australia ==
In 1981 Hamilton returned to the United States. He was appointed chairman of two US companies involved in the placement of private capital for films and corporations. He also served as a senior consultant to several national companies in the US. In 2001 Hamilton returned to Australia, performing in music and acting. In 2002 he performed in the international television series Guinevere Jones, playing the role of Merlin. In 2011 Hamilton was appointed Australia Day Ambassador.

== Social involvement and honors ==
In the 2013 Australia Day Honours List Hamilton was awarded an OAM for service to the performing arts and to the community.

== Discography ==
=== Studio albums ===
List of albums, with selected chart positions
Title	Album details	Peak chart positions
Title	Album details	AUS
Three Sides of Ted Hamilton	Released: 1973; Format: LP; Label: Fable (FBSA 028)	28
Ted Hamilton's New Wave	Released: 1974; Format: LP; Label: ATA (L 35038)	-

=== Singles ===
List of singles, with selected chart positions
Year	Title	Peak chart positions	Album
Year	Title	AUS	Album
1959	"Primrose Lane" (With The Errol Buddle Quintet)	-	non album single
1959	"The Things We Did Last Summer" (With The Errol Buddle Quintet)	-	non album single
1960	"The Lovin' Touch" (With Bob Gibson and His Orchestra)	-	non album single
1960	"Ding Dong Bell" (With Bob Gibson and His Orchestra)	-	non album single
1973	"Get On With Your Livin'"	81	Three Sides of Ted Hamilton
1974	"Dandenong Grass"	-	Ted Hamilton's New Wave

== Filmography ==
=== Film ===
Year	Title	Role	Type
1976	The Love Boat	Thomas Ford, The Captain	TV movie
1978	The Deerslayer	Sieur de Beaujeur	TV movie
1980	M Station: Hawaii	Vasili Litvak	TV movie
1981	The Pirate Movie	The Pirate King	Feature film

=== Television ===
Year	Title	Role	Type
1950s	The Ford Show	Guest	TV variety series
	Calling the Stars	Guest	TV variety series
	The Gladys Moncrieff Show	Guest	TV variety series
	Hit Parade	Guest	TV variety series
1958	The Shirley Abicair Show	Guest	TV variety series
	Bandstand	Guest	TV variety series
	Sydney Tonight	Guest	TV variety series
1960	Have Gun - Will Travel	Catcher	TV series, 1 episode
1961–62	Revue 61/62	Regular guest	TV variety series
1962	Make Mine Music	Guest	TV variety series
1965	In Melbourne Tonight	Compere	TV variety series
1968	Homicide	Roger Hendricks	TV series, 1 episode
1969-75	Division 4	Senior Constable Kevin Dwyer	TV series, 227 episodes
1973	Ted Hamilton and Johnny Farnham - together again for the very first time	Performer	TV variety special
1973	Ted Hamilton's New Wave	Host	TV variety series, 6 episodes
1973-75	The Graham Kennedy Show	Guest performer	TV variety series, 5 episodes
1974	Ted Hamilton's Musical World	Host	TV variety series, 13 episodes
1975	M*A*S*H	Lieutenan Chivers	TV series, 1 episode
1977	The Six Million Dollar Man	Jaffe	TV series, 1 episode
1979	Hawaii Five-O	Larry Wilkens	TV series, 1 episode
1979	A Man Called Sloane	Bannister	TV series, 1 episode
1979	Flying High	Captain Arnold Rudd	TV series, 1 episode
1984	Blue Thunder	Harold Longstreet	TV series, 1 episode
1988	Mission: Impossible	Chambers	TV series, 1 episode
1990	Rafferty's Rules	Snowy White	TV series, 1 episode
2002	Guinevere Jones	Merlin	TV series, 1 episode
