= Barry Stanton (musician) =

Australian musician (1941–2018)

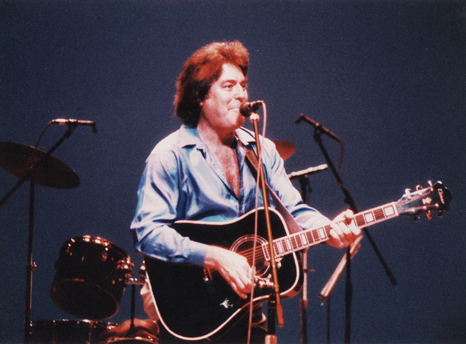
- Stanton performing at Melbourne Concert Hall in 1997

Background information
- Born: Barry John Stanton; 23 January 1941; London, England
- Origin: Sydney, Australia
- Died: 21 January 2018 (aged 76) Sydney, Australia
- Genres: Rock and roll
- Occupation: Musician
- Instruments: Vocals; guitar
- Years active: 1957–2018
- Labels: Leedon; Festival; RCA; Raven; Canetoad

Barry John Stanton (23 January 1941 – 21 January 2018) was a British-Australian rock and roll musician. He performed on pop music programs, Six O'Clock Rock, Bandstand, Johnny O'Keefe Show, Sing Sing Sing, Saturday Date, and Woody's Teen Time. He issued a compilation album, A Tribute to the King Rare Songs 1957-1965, in 1988.

Stanton released singles via Leedon Records, starting with "Don't Let Go" in April 1960. His second, "Don't You Worry 'Bout That" (September), was written by O'Keefe, which reached number 3 on the local Top 40. His fourth single, "Beggin' on My Knees" (November 1961), was written by his brother Rod and reached number 16, nationally. Stanton was signed by RCA in 1964 and issued another single, "A Tribute to the King". This was written by fellow musician and the label's A&R, Johnny Devlin. He followed with "My Little Emmy" in July 1965, which was written by Stanton. Even though he was a popular performer locally, he achieved little commercial success internationally. Stanton subsequently performed with other early Australian rockers.

== Early life ==
Barry Stanton was born in London on 23 January 1941. The Stanton family—Stella Rose, Carl Leopold, Barry John and Rodney—migrated to Australia in 1948. They settled in the Sydney suburb of Neutral Bay. At the age of 15 Stanton became interested in rock and roll. He left school and worked as apprentice motor mechanic. His early bands included the Boppers and the Bellairs; they played gigs at local dance halls. Stanton provided "some Presley-type singing and guitar-playing." In 1957 he recorded material, which was not released until 1988, issued on his compilation album, A Tribute to the King Rare Songs 1957-1965, via Canetoad Records. According to Ainslie Baker of The Australian Women's Weekly, he "has brown eyes, is 6ft. 1in. tall, weighs 13-1/2 stone, likes cars and car-racing, surfing, and football."

== Lee Gordon/Leedon ==
Stanton was "talent spotted" in 1959 while playing during the interval in between Marlon Brando and James Dean films at Manly's Embassy Theatre, by 2SM radio DJ, Allan Lappan. He was recommended to Johnny O'Keefe who recruited Stanton for a spot on the rocker's TV pop music show, Six O'Clock Rock. He became "one of the most popular young male artists of the day." He also appeared regularly on pop, variety TV show, Bandstand. One of the few artists to use his real name, O'Keefe branded him the "Big Boy of Rock" due to his solid physique.

Stanton signed to O'Keefe and Lee Gordon's label, Leedon Records, in 1960, which issued his debut extended play, Barry Stanton Sings. His first single – a cover version of Roy Hamilton's "Don't Let Go" – appeared in April. It was recorded with chorus and orchestra directed by Eddie Cash, Jr (a pseudonym of O'Keefe). He began touring with other local artists, Digby Richards, Jimmy Little, and Warren Williams. In May to June that year he took part in an interstate tour supporting Johnny O'Keefe and the Dee Jays, Laurel Lea, Booka Hyland, Lonnie Lee, the Sapphires and Ray Hoff. Stanton left the tour in mid-June as he was "too exhausted to sign on for an extra week of engagements." In the following week O'Keefe lost control of his Plymouth Belvedere near Kempsey and was involved in a serious car accident.

Stanton's follow-up single, "Don't You Worry 'Bout That", written by O'Keefe, appeared in September 1960. It was well received in most states, reaching No. 37 on the Sydney music charts. Late in the following year he issued his fourth single, "Beggin's on My Knees", which became his most successful hit when it reached No. 16 on the national top 40. The track is written by his younger brother, Rod Stanton, who later explained how "One day, strumming on an old guitar given to him by Barry, he asked his brother to have a listen to a fresh composition he was quite happy with. Its potential was immediately recognised by Barry and, perhaps even more importantly, by his producer, [O'Keefe]." Warren Carr played its "ear grabbing tinkling piano."

== 1964–1980 ==
Stanton was approached to switch to RCA by New Zealand-born rocker Johnny Devlin, who from late 1963 was the label's Australian A&R manager and house producer. Stanton's first single on the label, "Tribute to the King" was released in 1964. It was written by Devlin as a tribute to Presley, which "consisted of 32 Elvis Presley song titles set to rocking instrumental backing provided by Devlin's backing band The Devils." His next single, "My Little Emmy", which was written by Stanton, was released in July 1965. Stanton undertook interstate tours supporting Billy Thorpe & the Aztecs and Ray Brown & the Whispers.

Though only releasing two singles while at RCA, he recorded more material, however after leaving the label in 1966, the recordings were unreleased. According to Australian musicologist, Ian McFarlane, "with the lack of success of his RCA sides, Stanton gave up his rock'n'roll career to work as an electrician." In 1974 he resumed his music career to join O'Keefe and fellow 1960s rockers Ray Brown, Lonnie Lee, Jade Hurley, Johnny Devlin, Dinah Lee and Tony Brady as part of a touring ensemble, The Good Old Days of Rock 'n' Roll. The nostalgia circuit was successful with the tour continuing for four years. In 1978 he issued a single, "City of Armidale", via the Bunyip label.

== 1981–onward ==
In 1981 Raven Records issued a compilation, split album, Rock On!, with "most of Stanton's singles as one half" and the rest from fellow rocker, Johnny Rebb. Stanton's early material, including previously unreleased tracks, was issued as a solo compilation album, A Tribute to the King Rare Songs 1957-1965, via Canetoad Records. Concert bookings had become rarer, and Stanton returned to working a day job, as a warehouse manager. He periodically played shows until 2006, when he took a break from showbiz to spend time with his grandchildren. After two years, he performed a comeback concert in Melbourne.

== Personal life ==
Barry Stanton married fellow singer, Kelly Green, and the couple had two children. They had met in Green's hometown of Perth at the Fiesta Theatre, and after Green relocated to Sydney in 1962 Stanton saw her on Bandstand and they started dating. Stanton wrote one of Green's tracks, "Tell Me That You Love Me Too", which was the B-side of her single, "Do You?" (August 1964). The couple separated in 1965 before their second child was born, with Green returning to Perth.

In the mid-1970s he married a second time, to Rena, and this couple had three children.

Stanton died of renal failure on 21 January 2018, two days short of his 77th birthday.

== Discography ==
- Don't Let Go (1960) Lee Gordon
1. Don't Let Go (I. Hayes)
2. I Got A Woman (R. Richard/R. Charles)
- Don't You Worry 'Bout That (1960) Leedon
1. Don't You Worry 'Bout That (O'Keefe)
2. You Are Gone (Dempsey-Zoeller)
- Barry Stanton Sings EP (1960) Leedon
1. Don't Let Go; I Got A Woman
2. Don't You Worry 'Bout That; You Are Gone
- A Teenage Idol (1961) Leedon
1. A Teenage Idol (O'Keefe)
2. Indeed, I Do (Scharr)
- A Teenage Idol EP (1961) Leedon
1. Teenage Idol; Indeed, I Do
2. Begging on My Knees; Solitary Confinement
- Beggin' On My Knees (1962) Leedon
1. Beggin' On My Knees (R. Stanton)
2. Solitary Confinement (Colijah-Pori)
- Back in Your Arms (1962) Leedon
1. Back in Your Arms (R. Stanton)
2. For Now And Always (R. Stanton)
- Little Miss Heartbreak (1963) Leedon
1. Little Miss Heartbreak (Bass-Boyer)
2. You'll Never Learn, Will Yer? (B. Stanton)
- Little Miss Heartbreak EP (1963) Leedon
1. Little Miss Heartbreak; You'll Never Learn, Will Yer?
2. Back in Your Arms; For Now And Always
- A Tribute to the King (1964) RCA
1. A Tribute to the King (Devlin)
2. That's Right, All Right (R. Stanton)
- My Little Emmy (1965) RCA
1. My Little Emmy (B. Stanton)
2. Dancing Partner (Crane/Wisner/Paddy)
- City of Armidale (1978) Bunyip
1. City of Armidale (R. Stanton)
2. Big Front Door (R. Stanton)
- Rock On! w/Johnny Rebb (1981) Raven
- Mona Lisa & Others (1981) KEG
- A Tribute to the King (Rare Songs 1957–1965) (1988) Canetoad
