= Warren Carr =

- Born: Newcastle, New South Wales, Australia
- Died: 31 May 1993
- Genres: Popular music, country music
- Occupations: Singer; composer; musician; producer
- Instrument: Piano
- Label: Leedon Records
- Formerly of: Johnny O'Keefe, Warren Williams

Warren Carr (died 1993) was an Australian singer, composer, producer and musician, specializing in country and rock 'n' roll, although his music was better described as Honky Tonk piano party style. He is best known for his 20-year involvement as in-house pianist in the ABC children's TV show, Play School from 1972 until 1993.

== Biography ==
The Newcastle, New South Wales-born Carr started his career at a young age, and 1960 featured in John Konrads Kaydets. He recorded numerous covers including songs by Floyd Cramer. In the 1960s, he performed with a number of Australian rock artists, including Johnny O'Keefe, Warren Williams and Jimmy Little. He produced a number of his own albums for Leedon Records. His single Li'l Ole Me reached number 9 in the Sydney charts, he also appeared on O' Keefe's Six O'Clock Rock music program.

Warren was the pianist on ABCs Play School from the years of 1972 to 1993. His primary role was off camera playing the piano to accompany the other presenters' songs, but he was occasionally featured on camera, and also took part in presenting some non musical parts of the show. From 1963 to 1993, Warren served as musical director at Sydney's, St George Leagues club

== Personal life ==
Carr died in 1993 of heart disease. He has two sons, Darren and Michael. His son is Michael Carr, an ARIA Award winning performer known as Buddy Goode, a country musician, songwriter and entertainer, who won the 2012 & 2014 ARIA Award for Best Comedy Album. His son Darren Carr is ventriloquist and a multi Mo Award-winning Entertainer of the Year.

== Discography ==
=== Albums ===
List of albums, with Australian chart positions
Title	Album details	Peak chart positions
Title	Album details	AUS
Lil' Ole Me and My Piano	Released: 1962; Label: Leedon (LL-30,804)	-
50 Years of Evergreens	Released: 1963; Label: Leedon (LL-31,057)	-
Music Hall Favourites	Released: 1964; Label: Leedon (LL-31,309)	-
36 Hollywood Hits	Released: 1965; Label: Leedon (LL-31,525)	-
A Night at The St. George Leagues Club	Released: 1966; Label: Leedon (LL-31,689); Note: Live	-
Party Time Piano	Released: 1972; Label: Universal Summit	-
Warren Carr Plays Twin Honky Tonk Pianos	Released: 1974; Label: Endeavour (004)	-
Honky Tonk Hits	Released: 1982; Label: Endeavour (008)	94
38 Years of Film Hits	Released: Label: Festival (SFL-932,036)	-
