= Laurel Lea =

Australian singer (1942–1992)

- Also known as: Lorraine Lianos
- Born: Lorraine May Chapman; 3 October 1942
- Origin: Armidale, New South Wales, Australia
- Died: 31 January 1992 (aged 49) Camperdown, New South Wales
- Genre: Pop
- Occupations: Singer, TV performer
- Years active: 1957–1992
- Labels: Leedon, CBS

External videos
- Please Don't Talk to the Lifeguard on YouTube
- Treasure of Your Love (1964) on YouTube
- It Doesn't Matter Anymore (with husband Kevin Todd) on YouTube
- Easier Said Than Done on YouTube
- Alfie on YouTube

Lorraine May Chapman (3 October 1942 – 31 January 1992), professionally known as Laurel Lea, was an Australian popular singer of the late 1950s and early 1960s. Lea appeared regularly on TV series, Bandstand, Six O'Clock Rock and Saturday Date. In 1974 and 1975 she toured throughout Australia with contemporaries Johnny O'Keefe, Johnny Devlin, Lonnie Lee and Barry Stanton. On 31 January 1992 Lea died of leukaemia.

== Biography ==
Laurel Lea was born as Lorraine May Chapman. She was raised in Armidale, New South Wales by Con Lianos and was known as Lorraine Lianos. Con and his wife ran a travelling performance troupe and Laurel joined them from the age of 15. Her younger brother Doug (born c. 1946) performed as a drummer, Little Rock Billy in the early 1960s. (Note: according to her son Mark in 2022, Doug was not her brother; he was a friend and was nicknamed her "brother.") In 1958 Lea signed with Leedon Records and was promoted by its founder, United States-born Lee Gordon.

At the end of 1960, Lea broke her jaw in a fall and was unable to sing for six months. She regularly appeared on TV series Bandstand, Saturday Date and Six O'Clock Rock. Lea was inspired by Brigitte Bardot, "I used to copy her mannerisms, and the way she opened her eyes and looked up like this". In October 1963 an audience of 40,000 attended a 2UW concert with the roster including Lea, Bee Gees, Lonnie Lee, Col Joye and Judy Stone. Lea recorded several singles, but had limited chart success.

In 1974 and 1975, she joined her contemporaries Johnny O'Keefe, Johnny Devlin, Lonnie Lee, Barry Stanton, Jade Hurley and Tony Brady in the Good Old Days of Rock 'n' Roll Tour which travelled throughout Australia. Lea returned to the updated Bandstand ‘76 show now hosted by Daryl Somers for a one off live performance.

She also had a band in the 1980s called Chockarock.

== Personal life ==
In 1960 or 1961 she married fellow Bandstand singer Kevin Todd (born ca. 1943), and the couple had a son Mark (born ca. 1962). The pair often performed duets and by December 1963 had signed with CBS Records. By November 1975, Lea had been married and divorced twice, "[she] has finished with two husbands and has a son of 13 1/2".

Laurel Lea died of leukemia on 31 January 1992 in Camperdown, New South Wales, aged 49.

== Legacy ==
From 12 October 2003, ABC-TV series, Love Is in the Air, was a five-part documentary on Australian pop music with "Episode 2: She's Leaving Home" describing female pop stars and how many travelled overseas to try to further their careers, Lea was described, "[a]ccomplished television regulars like Laurel Lea had the look, the sound and the talent". The program featured two of her tracks, "Alfie" and "Tomorrow".

== Discography ==
Singles

- "I'll Save the Last Dance" (December 1960)
- "Bermuda" (1962)
- "Treasure of Your Love" / "What I Don't Know Won't Hurt Me" (CBS BA-221104, 1964)
- "I Shall Take My Leave" / "You're Closer to Me" (Parlophone A-8807 1969)

TELEVISION

Year	Title	Performance	Type
1959-1962	Six O'Clock Rock	Herself - Singer	ABC TV series
1962	Saturday Date	Herself - Singer	TV series
1962	The Johnny O'Keefe Show	Herself - Singer	TV series, 1 episode
1963-1968	Bandstand	Herself - Singer	TV series, 12 episodes
1963	Sing Sing Sing	Herself - Singer	TV series, 2 episodes
1966	Jimmy	Herself - Guest	TV series, 1 episode
1969	This Day Tonight	Herself - Singer sings "Alfie"	ABC TV series, 1 episode
1975	The Ernie Sigley Show	Herself - Singer	TV series, 2 episodes
1975	This Is Your Life	Guest - Herself	TV series, 1 episode "Johnny O'Keefe"
1976	Countdown	Herself - Singer	ABC TV series, 1 episode
1976	Bandstand '76	Herself - Singer sings "You're No Good"	TV series, 1 episode
1978, 1979	The Mike Walsh Show	Herself - Guest	TV series, 1 episode
1978	Reg Lindsay's Country Homestead	Herself - Singer sings "Crazy Arms" / "I Still Miss Someone"	TV series, 1 episode
1979; 1980	The Mike Walsh Show	Guest Performer	TV series, 1 episode
1980	Country Music	Herself - Guest	ABC TV series, 1 episode
1980, 1981	The Mike Walsh Show	Guest with Warren Williams, Bryan Davies, Little Pattie, Lucky Starr.	TV series, 1 episode
1981	Australian Music Stars Of The 60s	Herself - Archive clip	TV special
1981	Channel Nine Celebrates: 25 Years Of Television	Herself - Archival 'Bandstand' clip with Brian Henderson	TV special
1981; 1983	The Mike Walsh Show	Guest Performer	TV series, 1 episode
1983; 1984	The Mike Walsh Show	Guest - Herself	TV series, 1 episode
1984	The Mike Walsh Show	Guest - Herself	TV series, 1 episode
1995	Australian Women In Rock And Pop Music	Herself - Archive clips	TV Documentary
2001	Long Way to the Top	Herself - Archive clip	ABC TV series, 1 episode
2003	Love Is in the Air	Herself - Archive clip 'This Day Tonight'	ABC TV series, 1 episode 2: "She's Leaving Home"

== Reading ==
- Jackson, Graham (2001). Pioneers of Australian rock 'n' roll. ISBN 0646416103.
