= Kelly Green =

Kelly Green may refer to:

- Kelly green, a shade of green
- Kelly Green (musician) (born 1947), Australian singer
- Kelly Green (comics), a comics series by Leonard Starr and Stan Drake

== See also ==
- Kelly Greene (fl. 2010s–2020s), Canadian politician
- Irish green (disambiguation)
