= List of Six O'Clock Rock episodes =

Six O'Clock Rock was an Australian rock and roll television program broadcast nationally on ABC Television from 28 February 1959 to 23 December 1961 at 6 p.m. on Saturdays. It was broadcast live from Sydney on ABN2, with a recording shown later in Adelaide on ABS2, Brisbane on ABQ2, and Melbourne on ABV-2. These interstate broadcasts were shown at a later date. Some pre-recorded filmed clips were shown of American musicians. Only four episodes are known to still exist: 1 August 1959, 7 May 1960, 17 December 1960, 4 March 1961. They are held at the National Film and Sound Archive.

== Series overview ==
Series	Episodes	Originally aired	
Series	Episodes	First aired	Last aired
1	43	28 February 1959	19 December 1959
2	49	9 January 1960	17 December 1960
3	46	8 February 1961	30 December 1961

== Episodes ==
=== Series 1 (1959) ===
Date	Host	Performers	Notes	Reference
28 February 1959	Rickie Merriman	Johnny O'Keefe and the Dee Jays, the Australian All Stars, The Graduates, Reg Lindsay	First episode. Duration: 45 minutes. Originally announced as being hosted by Rickie Merriman with musical acts to be Johnny O'Keefe, Diana Trask, Johnny Borg. This was then changed to O'Keefe hosting as well as performing with his band.	
7 March 1959	Rickie Merriman	Johnny O'Keefe and the Dee Jays, Australian All Stars, Barbara Foulds, Ray Melton, Roy Giles, The Dee Jays, Rickie Merriman, Diana Trask, Ted Hamilton, The Crescents	The program began airing in Melbourne on this date.	
14 March 1959	Rickie Merriman	Johnny O'Keefe and the Dee Jays, Johnny Rebb		
21 March 1959	Rickie Merriman	Johnny O'Keefe and the Dee Jays, Col Joyce, Frankie Avalon,		
28 March 1959	Rickie Merriman	Johnny O'Keefe and the Dee Jays, Jimmy Little, Stan Freburg		
4 April 1959	Rickie Merriman	Johnny O'Keefe and the Dee Jays, Australian All Stars, Bill Burton, Tony Brady		
11 April 1959		Johnny O'Keefe and the Dee Jays, Bill Burton Orchestra	This was O'Keefe's last show for several weeks as he was set to tour New Zealand.	
18 April 1959	Allan Lappan	Frank Ifield, Bobby Day		
25 April 1959	Allan Lappan	Australian All Stars, Johnny Rebb and the Rebels		
2 May 1959	Allan Lappan & Johnny Rebb	Johnny Rebb and the Rebels		
9 May 1959	Allan Lappan & Johnny Rebb	Johnny Rebb and the Rebels, Frankie Davidson		
16 May 1959	Allan Lappan			
23 May 1959	Allan Lappan	Sandy Garufi and his Prairie-landers, Johnny Rebb and the Rebels, the Graduates, Carole Smith, Jimmy Little, George Payne, Rama White, Gary Cohen	Johnny Rebb was listed as hosting in some press.	
30 May 1959	Allan Lappan	Russ Arno, The Flamingos, June Hamilton, Johnny Rebb and the Rebels, The Graduates, The A.B.C Streamliners, Dig Richards, Sal Mineo, Denis Spicer		
6 June 1959	Allan Lappan	Bill Burton, Johnny Rebb and the Rebels, The Graduates Jonnny Summers, Faye Fisher.		
13 June 1959		Johnny Devlin, Delltones		
20 June 1959	Johnny O'Keefe	Candy & Mandy, Norman Erskine	Johnny O'Keefe returned. He became the permanent host from this show on.	
27 June 1959				
4 July 1959		Barry Sisters, Warren Williams		
11 July 1959				
18 July 1959	Johnny O'Keefe	The Dee Jays, Lloyd Price, Conway Twitty, Kalin Twins, Allen Brothers	Broadcast the following week in Melbourne.	
25 July 1959				
1 August 1959	Johnny O'Keefe	Dig Richards, The Delltones, Jimmy Griffiths, Maria Cortez, Ernie Wilson, Bev West and film clips of Louis Primer and Keily Smith		
8 August 1959	Johnny O'Keefe	John Hurley		
15 August 1959	Johnny O'Keefe	John Hyland, Lucky Starr		
22 August 1959		Lonnie Lee, Alan Dale		
28 August 1959		Ray Hoff		
5 September 1959		Johnnie Ray	American singer Johnnie Ray made an appearance on the program but didn't sing. Broadcast the following week in Melbourne.	
12 September 1959	Johnny O'Keefe	Barry Stanton		
19 September 1959	Johnny O'Keefe	Rob E G		
26 September 1959		George Karen		
3 October 1959				
10 October 1959				
17 October 1959		John Laws		
24 October 1959	Tanya Halesworth	Johnny Devlin and the Devils	O'Keefe left Australia for the US on October 23, prior to this episode.	
31 October 1959	Tanya Halesworth	Johnny Rebb & The Rebels, The ABC Streamliners	Broadcast the following week in Melbourne.	
7 November 1959	Tanya Halesworth			
14 November 1959	Tanya Halesworth	Johnny Devlin and the Devils		
21 November 1959	Johnny O'Keefe	The Dee Jays, Lonnie Lee and Warren Williams, the Crescents, Delltones.	O'Keefe returned from the US on November 19 to host. This was the first episode extended to one hour.	
28 November 1959		Carol Davies, Kerry Bryant, Ted Hamil, Freddie Logan Quintet		
5 December 1959				
12 December 1959				
19 December 1959		The Toppers, TheTunettes (Diane Walsh, Geraldine Brown and EdnaRoss), the Dee Jays, Kerry Bryant, the Delltones, Warren Williams, Lonnie Lee, Yvonne McLeod and The Crescents.	Final show of the year. Christmas special. Episode was broadcast in Queensland on 2 January 1960.	

=== Series 2 (1960) ===
Date	Host	Performers	Notes	Reference
9 January 1960		Crash Craddock	First show of the year.	
16 January 1960				
23 January 1960	Johnny O'Keefe	The Dee Jays, The Maori Hi Five	In Queensland, an earlier episode was aired featuring Adam (Ian McLeod), The Dee Jays, The Allen Brothers, The Fauns.	
30 January 1960	Johnny Rebb	Johnny Rebb and the Rebels	O'Keefe left Australia for the US prior to this episode. He was in the US for four weeks.	
6 February 1960	Johnny Rebb			
13 February 1960	Johnny Rebb	Johnny Rebb and the Rebels		
20 February 1960	Johnny Rebb	Johnny Rebb and the Rebels, Noelene Batley		
27 February 1960		Jan Carter, Fauns		
5 March 1960				
12 March 1960		Gina Curtis, Dee Jays, Delltones, Taylor Sisters, Lucky Starr, Dale Wayne, Rosemary Butler, Ray Leatherday, Barry Stanton, the Newtones, Lee Gallagher's Band, Graeme Bell Band	Performer list comes from Melbourne TV guide. Program aired in Melbourne the following week, and in Brisbane in two weeks later on 26 March.	
19 March 1960	Johnny O'Keefe	Maori Hi Five, Johnny Devlin, the Delltones, Lonnie Lee, The Crescents, The Two G's, Ellta Robins, Greg Friend, Jerry Lee Lewis, Johnny & Hurricane, Dick Caruso	O'Keefe returned to Australia from the US to host this episode. Program aired in Melbourne the following week. In Queensland, an earlier episode was aired featuring Jimmy Gussey and his streamline band.	
26 March 1960	Tanya Halesworth	Lucky Star, Wilfried Froese, Ray Price Band	Performer list comes from Melbourne TV guide. Program aired in Melbourne the following week.	
2 April 1960			In Queensland, the episode from 19 March 1960 aired today.	
9 April 1960		De Kroo Bros, Rhett Walker		
16 April 1960		Don Andrews	In Melbourne, a program aired featuring the De Kroo Bros	
23 April 1960		Laurel Lee, Judy Cannon		
30 April 1960				
7 May 1960	Johnny O'Keefe	Johnny O'Keefe, The Delltones, Ian Crawford, The Gus Merzi Sextet, Shirley Simmons backed by The Gus Merzi Sextet, The Dee Jays, Bobby Rydell, Johnny Borge with backing by The Dee Jays, Percy Faith		
14 May 1960		The Powell Twins	In Melbourne, a program aired featuring the Dee Jay's and the Dell Tones	
21 May 1960			In Melbourne, a program aired featuring the Dee Jay's and the Dell Tones	
28 May 1960	Johnny O'Keefe	Tony Brady, Valda Hammick, Dig Richards, Jan Carter, Lucky Starr, The Crescents, Bruce Gillespie	In Melbourne, a program aired featuring the Dee Jay's and the Dell Tones	
4 June 1960		Don North		
11 June 1960				
18 June 1960				
25 June 1960				
2 July 1960	Tanya Halesworth & Rhet Walker		Johnny O'Keefe was injured in a car accident, Tanya Halesworth & Rhet Walker took over hosting.	
9 July 1960	Tanya Halesworth			
16 July 1960				
23 July 1960		Judy Stone	In Queensland, a program aired hosted by Tanya Halesworth & Rhet Walker and featuring Dig Richards, Warren Williams, and Lonnie Lee.	
30 July 1960	Tanya Halesworth & Rhet Walker	Johnny Ashcroft		
6 August 1960				
13 August 1960		Terry Bryant		
20 August 1960	Johnny O'Keefe		Johnny O'Keefe returned. This program was broadcast in Queensland the following week.	
27 August 1960	Johnny O'Keefe	ABC Dance Band, Hi Lites		
3 September 1960	Johnny O'Keefe			
10 September 1960	Johnny O'Keefe			
17 September 1960	Johnny O'Keefe			
24 September 1960	Johnny O'Keefe	Judy Stone, Joe Loufer Swingtet, Gary Stewart, Pat Monroe, Barry Stanton, Police Choir		
1 October 1960	Johnny O'Keefe			
8 October 1960	Johnny O'Keefe			
15 October 1960	Johnny O'Keefe	Bryan Davies	In Melbourne, a program aired featuring Ray Price's Dixieland Group	
22 October 1960	Johnny O'Keefe	The Esplin Puppets, the Provost Bros, the Dee Jays, the Belles, Carol Murray, Judy Cannon.		
29 October 1960	Johnny O'Keefe	Roland Storm, Kevin Todd		
5 November 1960	Johnny O'Keefe			
12 November 1960	Johnny O'Keefe	Paul Wayne, the Esplin Puppets	In Queensland, a program aired featuring The Stirling Primmer Quartet, Bruce Gillespie, Dig Richards, the Allen Brothers, The Graduates, Bernie Cannon, and Kevin Todd.	
19 November 1960	Johnny O'Keefe	Wayne Cornell	In Melbourne, a program aired featuring The Dee Jays, Ray Price Port Jackson Jazz Band, Dig Richards, Roy Giles, the Graduates, Booke Hyland, Robble Royal. In Queensland, a program aired featuring Wade Peters.	
26 November 1960	Johnny O'Keefe		In Melbourne, a program aired featuring The Dee Jays, The Fauns, The Crescents, Wayne Cornell. In Queensland, a program aired featuring Johnny O'Keefe with the Dee Jays Band, The Port Jackson Jazz Band, Roy Giles, Dig Richards, Deke Drew, and Bob Royal.	
3 December 1960	Johnny O'Keefe	Tony Brady, The Le Garde Twins, Lynne Allison, Dig Richards	In Melbourne a "Favorite stars edition" aired, featuring Lonnie Lee, Warren Williams, Barry Stanton, Boka Hyland, Allan Brothers, Ian Crawford, Judy Stone, Lucky Star, De Kroo Brothers, Noelene Battley, Crescents, and Graduates. In Queensland, a program aired featuring the DeeJays, Wayne Cornell, The Fauns, and The Crescents.	
10 December 1960	Johnny O'Keefe	The Maori Hi-Fis, The Le Garde Twins, The Toppers	In Queensland, a program aired featuring Lonnie Lee, Barry Stantou, Warren Williams, Allen Brothers, The Graduates, and Judy Stone.	
17 December 1960	Johnny O'Keefe	Rob. E.G., The Debs, The Fauns, The Gus Merzi Sextet, Dig Richards, The Allen Brothers & The Barry Sisters, The Le Garde Twins, Ernie Wilson with the Gus Merzi Sextet, Lonnie Lee with The Dee Jays	Final episode of the year. Christmas special. Following the program O'Keefe planned to tour the US before Six O'Clock returned in February.	

=== Series 3 (1961) ===
Date	Host	Performers	Notes	Reference
18 February 1961	Tanya Halesworth & Chet Clark	Noeleen Batley, the Dee Jays, Barry Greenwood, Lonnie Lee and his Leeman, Booka Hyland, Barry Sextet, the Crescents, and The Fauns.	First episode of the year. Johnny O'Keefe was said to be returning once his tour of America ended. It was broadcast in Melbourne two weeks later.	
25 February 1961	Tanya Halesworth & Chet Clark	Dee Jays band		
4 March 1961	Tanya Halesworth & Chet Clark	Chet Clark, Bryan Davies, Lonnie Lee, Therese Talbiere backed by Enzo Toppano Quintet, The Enzo Toppano Quintet, The Fauns, The Dee Jay's, Jay Justin, Booker Hyland with Margaret from The Fauns, Johnny Byrell, Hal Wayne	In Melbourne, a program aired featuring Noeleen Batley, the Dee Jays, Barry Greenwood, Lonnie Lee and his Leeman, Booka Hyland, Barry Stanton, Gus Merzl's Sextet, the Crescents, Pattie Munroe, and Tthe Fauns. Connie Francis appeared during a pre-filmed segment.	
11 March 1961	Tanya Halesworth & Chet Clark		In Queensland, a program aired hosted by Tanya Halesworth & Chet Clark featuring Gregg Frend, The Hi-Fl's, Jack Allan and his band, Laurel Lee, The Graduates, Ian Crawford, Warren Williams, Bruce Gillespie, and Jimmy Little.	
18 March 1961	Tanya Halesworth & Chet Clark		In Queensland, a program aired featuring Enzo Toppano Quintet, Hal Wayne, Therese Talbert, Johnny Byrrell, The Crescents, The Fauns, Brian Davies, and Franco Buljeta. In Melbourne, a program aired featuring The Graduates, Tony Brady, Judy Stone, the De Kroo Brothers, the Dee Jays, and the Gus Merzi Sextet, Diane Georgeson, and the Taylor Sisters.	
25 March 1961	Tanya Halesworth & Chet Clark		In Queensland, a program aired featuring The Graduates, Tony Brady, Judy Stone, the De Kroo Brothers, the Dee Jays, and the Gus Merzi Sextet.	
1 April 1961	Tanya Halesworth & Chet Clark		In Queensland, a program aired featuring Chet Clark with the Dee Jays Band, Freddy Logan and The Three Out Trio, Max Geldray, The Unicorns, The Crescents, Barry Greenwood, Allen Brothers, Steve Shaw, Lorraine Garness. In Melbourne, a program aired featuring the same acts, as well as The Fauns.	
8 April 1961	Tanya Halesworth & Chet Clark	Mary Hoare	This program was broadcast in Melbourne the following week. In Melbourne, a program aired featuring the Dee Jays, The Fauns, Dave Millar, Roland Storm, Warren Williams, George Karren and Ray Hoff, The Chet Clark Trio Plus One, and Bruce Gillespie.	
22 April 1961		Fus Merzi Sextet, Eddie Calvert, The Fauns, Johnny Devlin, Lonnie Lee	In Melbourne, a program aired featuring Mary Hoare, Buddy Lane, Ernie Wilson, The Bells, Jack Allen's Band, and The Fauns.	
29 April 1961	Tanya Halesworth & Chet Clark		In Queensland, a program aired featuring the Gus Merzi Sextet with Nancy Eichorn, The Crescents, Barry Greenwood, Dee Jays Band. In Melbourne, a program aired featuring the same acts, as well as the Allen Brothers, Tony Brady, and Judy Stone.	
6 May 1961			In Queensland, a program aired featuring the Gus Merzi Sextet, Eddie Calvert, The Fauns, Johnny Devlin, Lonnie Lee, Dig Richards, Barry Stanton, Booka Hyland, and the Dee Jays Band. In Melbourne, a program aired featuring the same acts, as well as Lucky Star.	
13 May 1961	Tanya Halesworth & Chet Clark			
20 May 1961	Tanya Halesworth		In Sydney, only Tanya Halesworth was listed as the host, while Chet Clark continued to appear in Melbourne listings. In Melbourne, a program aired featuring Freddie Fane, the Dee Jays, Three Out Trio, Jan Carter, Ernie Wilson, the Taylor Sisters, Jade Hurley, the Fauns, Laurel Lee, the Allen Brothers, Rosalind Storm, and Lonnie Lee.	
27 May 1961	Tanya Halesworth			
3 June 1961	Tanya Halesworth			
10 June 1961	Tanya Halesworth		In Queensland, a program aired featuring Ray Peterson and The Dee Jays.	
17 June 1961	Tanya Halesworth			
24 June 1961	Tanya Halesworth		In Queensland, a program aired featuring Gus Merzi, Barry Greenwood, Nancy Eichorn, and the Dee Jays.	
1 July 1961				
8 July 1961	Tanya Halesworth			
15 July 1961	Tanya Halesworth		In Melbourne, a program aired featuring Roland Storm, Ian Crawford, Warren Williams, Rhett Walker, Brian Davies, the Allen Brothers, the De Kroo Brothers, Barry Stanton, Judy Cannon, Booka Hyland, Laurel Lea, and the Dee Jays.	
22 July 1961	Tanya Halesworth			
29 July 1961	Tanya Halesworth			
5 August 1961	Tanya Halesworth		In Melbourne, a program aired featuring The Crescents, Barry Greenwood, Kevin Darley, Jade Hurley, Ian Crawford, Ernie Wilson, Laurel Lee, and the Dee Jays.	
12 August 1961	Tanya Halesworth & Chet Clark			
19 August 1961			In Melbourne, a program aired featuring Toni Williams, Terry Maton, Barry Stanton, Booka Hyland, Laurel Lee, Patty Markham, Judy Cannon, the Dee Jays, and The Fauns.	
26 August 1961	Tanya Halesworth & Chet Clark		In Queensland, a program aired featuring The Dee Jays, Jim Gussey and the ABC Dance Band, The Crescents, Patti Monroe, Bobby Valentine, Judy Cannon, and Kevin Todd.	
2 September 1961	Tanya Halesworth & Chet Clark		In Melbourne, a program aired featuring Toni Williams, The Fauns, Joan Byrne, and the Dee Jays Band.	
9 September 1961	Tanya Halesworth & Chet Clark			
16 September 1961	Tanya Halesworth	Dee Jays Band		
23 September 1961	Tanya Halesworth & Chet Clark		In Melbourne, a program aired featuring the Taylor Sisters.	
30 September 1961	Tanya Halesworth & Chet Clark			
7 October 1961	Tanya Halesworth		In Queensland, a program aired featuring Ray Peterson and The Dee Jays.	
14 October 1961	Tanya Halesworth			
21 October 1961	Tanya Halesworth & Chet Clark	Cliff Richard, Laurel Lea		
28 October 1961	Tanya Halesworth & Chet Clark	Laurel Lea	In Melbourne, a program aired featuring Johnny Devlin, Kevin Todd, Judy Cannon, Little Sammy and an interview with Cliff Richard.	
4 November 1961	Tanya Halesworth & Chet Clark			
11 November 1961	Tanya Halesworth & Chet Clark	Col Joye, Tony Brent		
18 November 1961	Tanya Halesworth & Chet Clark			
25 November 1961	Tanya Halesworth & Chet Clark	Tony Brent, Laurel Lee, Lucky Starr		
2 December 1961	Tanya Halesworth & Chet Clark	Tony Brent, Tony Brady		
9 December 1961	Tanya Halesworth	Johnny Chester	In Melbourne, a program aired featuring Tony Brent, Kevin Todd and Tony Brady	
16 December 1961	Tanya Halesworth & Chet Clark			
23 December 1961	Tanya Halesworth	Betty McQuade, Bryan Davies, Lucky Start, Barry Stanton, Judy Cannon, Little Sammy, The Fauns, Tony Brent.	Final episode. This aired the following week in Queensland on 30 December 1961. In Melbourne, a program aired on 23 December featuring Barry Cookson, Laurel Lee, Judy Cannon, and Little Sammy.	

== Notes ==
By September 1959, the program had featured 172 solo acts, 8 vocal groups, 16 dance groups, 8 additional bands, and 12 overseas acts. Not all performers were mentioned in the press, while some performances were mentioned but without dates attached. Additionally, outside of Sydney the episodes had delayed broadcasts so interstate television listings don't match the original Sydney broadcast dates.

- The Graduates were said to have appeared on every episode for the first six months in 1959.
- From overseas, Stan Freberg, and Mary Stallings appeared in 1959.
- Warren Williams appeared on the show circa August 1959.
- On 24 December 1960, an episode was broadcast in Queensland featuring Nina Raye, The Graduates, The Le Garde Twins, The Toppers, and Eddie Moses, hosted by Johnny O'Keefe.
- On 31 December 1960, an episode was broadcast in Queensland featuring the Gus Merzi Sextet, Ernie Wilson, Lonnie Lee, Warren Williams, Dig Richards, and The Debs, hosted by Johnny O'Keefe with the Dee Jay's Band.
