= Halesworth (disambiguation) =

Halesworth may refer to:

- Halesworth, a town in Suffolk, England
- Halesworth railway station in Suffolk
- RAF Halesworth, a World War II airfield in Suffolk
- Tanya Halesworth, Australian TV presenter
