= Barry Stanton =

Barry Stanton may refer to:

- Barry Stanton (musician)
- Barry Stanton (actor)
