= The Delltones =

Australian rock 'n' roll band (1958-1973)

- Clockwise from bottom left: Warren Lucas, Noel Widerberg, Ian "Peewee" Wilson, Brian Perkins in 1959

Background information
- Origin: Sydney, New South Wales, Australia
- Genres: Rock and roll; surf rock; doo-wop
- Years active: 1958–1973; 1978–2016
- Labels: CBS/Coronet; Chase; EMI; Festival; His Master's Voice; Leedon; Parlophone; RCA; Seven; Spin; Starseed; Summit; 7 Records
- Past members: See: Members
- Website: thedelltones.com

The Delltones were an Australian rock and roll group, which formed in 1958. They started as a doo-wop, harmony quartet with Warren Lucas (tenor vocals), Brian Perkins (baritone vocals), Noel Widerberg (lead vocals) and Ian "Peewee" Wilson (bass vocals). In July 1962, Noel Widerberg died in a car accident in the Sydney suburb of Brighton-le-Sands and, three weeks later, the group's single, "Get a Little Dirt on Your Hands", reached the top five on the local charts. Widerberg's position was filled by Col Loughnan (ex-The Crescents). The group disbanded in 1973.

Wilson, as the sole founding mainstay, reformed the group with new members in 1978 as a five – piece band. Along with stylistic changes, it led to their resurgence and a top 20 compilation album, Bop Til Ya Drop (1983). The Delltones performed for five decades; although their most successful recording years were in the 1960s. They were consistent live entertainers in Australia before disbanding in 2016.

== History ==
=== 1958-1959: Origins and early years ===
In 1958, Noel Widerberg (lead vocals) and Ian "Peewee" Wilson (bass vocals) were lifesavers at the Bronte Surf Club. They were interested in four-part doo wop harmonies, "such as The Diamonds and Elvis Presley's The Jordanaires," and began singing together at club socials. Later that year they were joined by Warren Lucas (tenor vocals), a member of a vocal group the Sapphires, and then by Brian Perkins (baritone vocals). The four met at a Bronte Club social to form the Delltones. According to music journalist, Ed Nimmervoll, the name means "'of tones' ('dell' meaning 'of' in Spanish)." They began harmonising at talent quests and on street corners. The quartet's first "professional engagement" was at a Kings Cross nightclub after they stopped its owner in the street and sang for him. He invited them to perform an impromptu session consisting of four songs – their total repertoire. They were paid with spaghetti bolognese and beer.

In early 1959, the Delltones visited Bob Rogers, a radio DJ for 2GB. They auditioned Widerberg's composition "Why" during a commercial break. Rogers phoned Lee Gordon, an American-born, Sydney-based promoter, and persuaded him, "to feature them on one of the early Stadium shows." The Delltones, whose average age was 21, performed in many of Gordon's Big Shows, backing vocalists and with their own feature spot. They provided harmony backing vocals for performances by visiting international and local artists (Johnny O'Keefe, Dig Richards, Johnny Rebb and Johnny Devlin). The Delltones also sang backing vocals on recording sessions for O'Keefe.

In mid-October 1959, the group (backed by The Rebels) performed in shows titled Lee Gordon's 1959 Rock'n'Roll Spectacular. The Sydney concerts were edited into a film called Rock 'n' Roll which premiered on 30 October. The film, thought lost but rediscovered in 2020, includes rare footage of a 1950s rock and roll concert in Australia.

=== 1960–1961: Early recordings and television ===
O'Keefe invited the Delltones to appear as regulars on his ABC Television music show Six O'Clock Rock, and the radio show, Rockville Junction. The band also appeared on the rival show, Bandstand, hosted by Brian Henderson. Their television show appearances helped to promote their act and "was the perfect platform for a successful recording career."

Lee Gordon also signed the Delltones to his Leedon Records recording label and, within a week, the group had cut their first single – a remake of the Crows' "Gee" and the Widerberg composition "Why". "Gee" was a success, eventually peaking at No. 15, with eight-week duration, on the Sydney charts; though it failed to make headway on the national Australian charts. Their second single, "Tonight", was released in October 1959, and was written by Widerberg. Its b-side was their cover version of Dion and the Belmonts' "Every Little Thing I Do"; it became a minor hit, but failed to generate sales nationally.

At this stage, the group's popularity as live performers began to increase rapidly. They were in demand for recording sessions, including on O'Keefe's "Shout", and Rebb's "Highway of Love". They also recorded harmony backing for country music artists, Slim Dusty, Reg Lindsay, and Lionel Long.

Their next single "Yes Indeed" peaked at number 30 on the local charts. But the follow-up release, a DooWop version of Vera Lynn's classic "White Cliffs of Dover", with Wilson singing a bass vocal lead, failed to make an impression. Disenchanted by Leedon's failure to promote these singles to a larger national audience, the group accepted an offer to switch to the CBS (Coronet) label in June 1960.

Following a performance on The Tommy Sands Show in mid 1960, the group befriended the Sands guitarist Scotty Turnbull who offered to write two songs for The Delltones – "Little Miss Heartbreak" and "Take This Heart". Turnbull also produced and played with Hal Blaine on drums for both singles. Unfortunately they were not a commercial success.

However, the next Coronet release proved to be the breakthrough that the group had been seeking for the past eighteen months. The single "You're The Limit", provided them with their first national hit when it reached the top ten across Australia. This release was even more successful in Sydney, reaching number 4 on the local charts, in January 1961.

After a better financial offer from EMI Records the group changed labels again and their next release "Wonder", was moderately successful at number 30 nationally. But the follow-up single String a Long, released in July, was a dismal failure.

An anecdote of The Delltones auditioning for Denis Wong, the colourful owner of the famous Sydney nightclub Chequers, has now entered into folklore. After their audition, Wong expressed his approval and asked "how much for you boys"? A fee was quoted and the ever frugal Wong replied "I take two" pointing at Widerberg and Wilson.

After the expiry of the EMI deal, they re-signed to the Leedon label, now owned by Festival Records, and immediately recorded "Get A Little Dirt on Your Hands" written by Bill Anderson. The record quickly picked up generous airplay right across Australia.

=== 1962: Tragedy ===
In early July 1962, two weeks after "Get a Little Dirt on Your Hands" entered the charts, Noel Widerberg was killed in a car accident in the Sydney beachside suburb of Brighton-Le-Sands. Widerberg lost control of the vehicle he was driving, which rolled four or five times, throwing the occupants from the vehicle, and Widerberg "head first into the gutter". The remaining group members were understandably devastated and all engagements were cancelled. After a period of inactivity, friends and business associates of the group persuaded the band to seek out a replacement and continue with their careers. The current single "Get A Little Dirt on Your Hands" proved to be the most successful to date, reaching No. 3 on the national charts. The song was also used on the soundtrack of the multi-award-winning movie The Year My Voice Broke.

According to Graham Jackson in his book, Pioneers of Australian rock 'n' roll, "As Warren Lucas was a good friend of Colin Loughnan, [...] Warren persuaded the others that Colin was the natural replacement for Noel". The Delltones didn't audition any other singers, and in fact no auditions were held at all. Jackson quotes Loughnan as saying: "it was short and sweet. It was just: 'Are you interested?' 'Yes' 'Okay, you're in'". Loughnan's style was distinctively different from Widerberg's.

After several weeks of rehearsal The Delltones entered the recording studio in November 1962 to record "Come A Little Bit Closer", written by Jerry Leiber and Mike Stoller. Around this time, Leedon released the band's first self-titled album which included all previously released material with Widerberg. He had been the guiding musical force and leader of the group. After his death, Wilson became the group's spokesperson. When "Come A Little Bit Closer" was released in 1963, it was an immediate hit and eventually became their all-time best seller. The single reached number 3 in Sydney's 2UE top 40, number 1 on 2GB top 30 and number 2 on 3UZ top 40. An album, entitled Come A Little Bit Closer, was also released to capitalise on the hit single. One track was Cotton Fields.

The follow-up single "Sitting in the Moonlight", was arranged in a similar style as its predecessor, with a harmonica introduction. It became the group's eighth Sydney chart entry.

At this time The Delltones participated in a modern pantomime for children, titled Mother Goose and The Three Stooges, which opened at the Palais Theatre in Sydney. The production also featured other pop stars and celebrities of the time including: Robie Porter aka "Rob E.G.", Brian Davies, Lucky Starr, Dig Richards, Jay Justin, and actor Jacki Weaver. Peewee played Mother Goose, with the other band members as the Stooges. The matinee show had a six-week run playing to full houses. They also performed an evening show, Once Upon A Surfie – a musical farce, which showcased the cast members' musical hits.

=== 1963-1968: Gone surfing ===
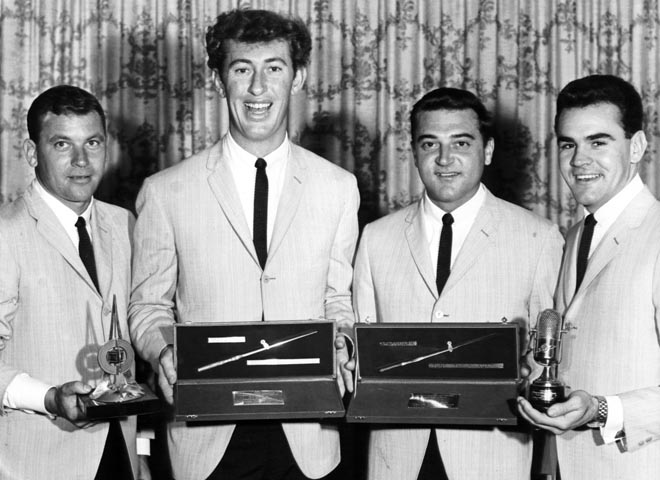
The Delltones with four radio awards, (l to r) Warren Lucas (tenor), Ian (Peewee) Wilson (bass), Brian Perkins (baritone) and Col Loughnan (lead)

By the latter part of 1963 surf music dominated the Australian Charts, particularly in Sydney and Brisbane. The Delltones were quick to release the tongue in cheek composition, "Hangin' Five", written by Ben Acton who was a police officer and also a lifesaver with Manly Surf Club and a member of the police band. This release was almost as successful as "Come A Little Bit Closer" – reaching number 3. "Hangin' Five" became a cult classic in California along with The Atlantics instrumental "Bombora". "Hangin' Five" also featured in Mel Gibson's first movie, a 1977 release called Summer City. In 1963, The Delltones picked up four radio awards including "Gold and Silver Baton Award," "Golden Microphone Award", and "The Best Australian Record Award".

Once again an album was quickly issued and consisted mainly of current surf hit covers. Since the surf craze showed little signs of waning, the next single "Out the Back" was also written by Ben Acton, but it failed to capture the light hearted spirit of "Hangin' Five".

In 1964, they released a reworking of The Tams' "Hey Girl Don't Bother Me", and the cover "Surfer Girl" by The Beach Boys which became a top 30 hit in most Australian states. Their next three singles failed to chart.

The first of the final two Leedon singles was a version of Paul Anka's "Lonely Boy." The final release on Leedon "Tonight We Love", was heavily produced in the style of Phil Spector, and was adapted from Tchaikovsky's Piano Concerto in B-flat minor. A period of recording inactivity followed. At this point the group concentrated on live performances, including shows for the troops in Vietnam. They later received "The Vietnam Logistic & Support Medal".

=== 1969: Further changes and London and Europe ===
After their return from Vietnam, Warren Lucas left the group, followed shortly by Col Loughnan. Loughnan joined the Daly-Wilson Big Band in 1969 and Ayers Rock in 1973, and went on to become one of Australia's most experienced reed instrument players, an arranger, and a teacher of reed instruments and flute, as well as Marcia Hines musical director for a time..

Ray Burton and Wayne Cornell filled the vacancies. Burton left after only a year: he went on to co-write "I am Woman" with Helen Reddy, who had an international hit with the song. He was replaced by Bill Kirwin. Both Cornell and Kirwin continued with the band until 1968.

In that same year, Sep Martin and Bob Pierse, formerly of The Ambassadors, joined The Delltones. Both were lead vocalists with experience in harmony. In 1969 the group went back to Vietnam and toured the Far East. They also went to London, like many other Australian artists such as the Bee Gees and The Seekers, in an attempt to crack the overseas market.

After a performance at the London Playboy Club, The Delltones were offered a seven-week residency. This is where Wilson met his wife, actress Carla Prowse, who also became the group's manager in 1981.

During their stay in London, The Delltones were signed to EMI records and recorded ten tracks for their later release, the London Session album, produced by expatriate David McKay from Eaton Music. Bob Pierse and Dig Richards wrote most of the songs. The album was arranged and conducted by Bill Shepherd of Bee Gees fame, and backed by Australian band The Twilights, led by guitarist Terry Britten, who would later write global hits for Cliff Richard, Tina Turner and Michael Jackson. One outstanding track was a reworking of Steve Winwood's "Gimme Some Lovin'" which became Radio Luxembourg's hit pick of the week and top DJ Tony Blackburn's opening signature tune.

They were also invited to perform "Gimme Some Lovin'" on Top of the Pops, hosted by Jimmy Savile. The single was released in America and Europe. The band also toured throughout Europe. After tensions arose between the group and their manager Bill Watson over financial problems they decided to return to Australia.

=== 1970–1973: Home and disenchantment ===
The Delltones returned to Australia at the end of 1970. The following year they recorded the classic single "Rock 'N' Roll Will Stand", which was backed with a Bob Pierse composition "Billy's Rock 'N' Roll" for Festival Records. Following this, they released the album London Session in Australia. The single release from this album "Birmingham" was also written by Bob Pierse and backed with a cover of Frank Zappa's "Tears Begin To Fall". But both releases failed to register on the charts. For the next three years the band toured nationally. The tour culminated with their near-demise, in the infamous fire at Brisbane's Whisky au Go Go nightclub.

In 1973, following disenchantment with city life, the show business industry and tensions within the group, The Delltones split up. Martin and Pierse continued performing as a duet, while Wilson and Perkins embraced alternative lifestyles and settled with their families at Eungai on the mid-north coast of NSW.

=== 1978–1983: Reformation ===
In 1978, after pressure from various sources, including Johnny O'Keefe, The Delltones reformed. They went on to tour for the next two years, sharing the bill with Digger Revell. The Delltones backing band at the time was Jon Hayton aka Farmer Jon, Michael Lawler and Leon Isackson. Former tensions and disputes arose in The Delltones, with Sep Martin leaving in 1981, followed by Bob Pierse, and finally Brian Perkins.

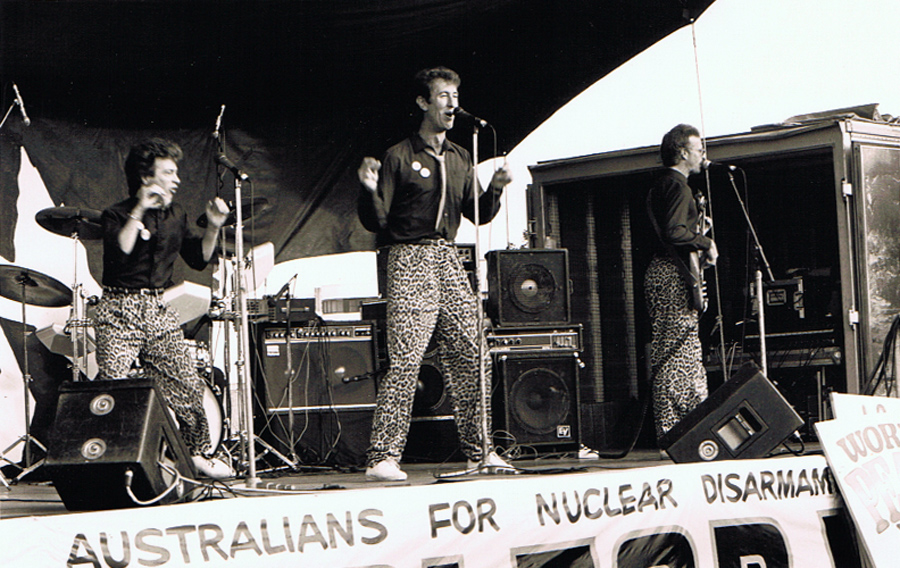
The Delltones performing at the Anti Nuclear Rally, 1983

By the end of 1981, Wilson, the only surviving member, realised the limits of a harmony ensemble in a live environment dominated by tensile Oz Rock bands. So he set about reinventing the venerable entity, changing it from vocal group to vocal band. The line up changed but the essence continued on. Contributors to these changes included musicians and vocalists: Alan Freeman, who previously played bass with the jazz singer Kerrie Biddell; Johnny Charters, who played with Johnny Rebb's Rebels in the 1960s; Alex Plavsic, an ex-member of the progressive rock group Sebastian Hardie; as well as Vic Schrier, Ralph Wilcock, Bob Cook, and Robert Kitney.

Danny Mayers joined The Delltones after Wilson saw him perform at the Palais Royale in Newcastle. The Delltones went on to play a record sixteen-week run at Kinselas in Sydney's Taylor Square, Darlinghurst, including a memorable guest performance by Tiny Tim. They performed at the Anti Nuclear Rally, alongside Aboriginal band No Fixed Address, and then at the Tivoli with Mondo Rock. By the end of 1983 they had played 171 gigs. At this stage the Band was being managed by Carla Wilson; they touched a wider range of Australians than almost any other rock group.

=== 1984–1987 : Revival ===
1984 kicked off with the rock 'n roll revival album Bop Til Ya Drop. It featured a garish pink and green jacket, designed by renowned artist Martin Sharp, who had also designed album covers for Cream. It went gold almost immediately, and was number 2 on the Kent Music Report Albums Chart in Sydney. It peaked at number 20 on the Australian Kent Music Report Albums Chart.

This coincided with a film clip for the single "Get A Job", directed by Yahoo Serious, who then cast Peewee for the role as his Dad in the film Young Einstein. The Delltones then played at Moomba, the Adelaide Festival of Arts and the AFI Awards, and appeared on the Australian television soap opera A Country Practice.

The release of the Tickled Pink album followed. It was recorded and mixed at Alberts Studio, produced by Bruce Brown and Russell Dunlop, the co-writers and producers of the number 1 hit "Space Invaders".

With their single "Papa Oom Mow Mow" at number 1, and Tickled Pink high on the charts, they went on to record the live album Out in the Open, in front of a record 28,000 people at the Toowoomba Showgrounds. The album failed to register on the national charts.

All These Things And More, a Christmas EP, was the last recording with Danny Mayers before he left to pursue his own career. He was later replaced by Nevin McLean in 1985. The group now consisted of five members including: Nevin McLean (vocals), Alan Freeman (tenor vocals/bass), Merv Dick (alto vocals/drums), Woody Finlayson (baritone vocals/guitar), and Wilson (bass vocals).

By this time The Delltones were in a revival, with regular appearances on television shows such as Hey Hey It's Saturday, The Mike Walsh Show, Donnie Sutherland's Sounds, The Midday Show and many more. The notable exception was Countdown. These appearances, along with press exposure, opened the doors to a national touring circuit, of clubs, pubs, theatres, and concert halls with sellout shows.

=== 1988-1994: Futile experiment and court case ===
In January 1988, the group performed as part of Australia's Bicentennial celebrations in front of Diana, Princess of Wales and Prince Charles.

Also during 1988, the start of the digital music revolution, Wilson and Alan Freeman, along with Russell Dunlop, experimented with traditional DooWop harmony and digitally generated music, using a Fairlight synthesiser, to develop the album Oasis. Both Freeman and Wilson wrote several of the tracks – "One Man Woman", "Touch and Go" and "You Changed My Life". These were featured along with revised versions of Aussie classics such as: Cold Chisel's "Forever Now" and The Reels' "Love will find a Way". The album failed to impress radio or their fans at live performances.

November 1988 saw Wilson and another of the original members of The Delltones, Brian Perkins, clash in court. Perkins, after seven years of absence from performing, formed a band called "The Dellies", a well-known Australian colloquialism for The Delltones, with ex-Delltones vocalist Danny Mayers, Sydney bass singer Max Wright, and Rikki Organ. Wilson claimed that Perkins was cashing in on The Delltones name, which Perkins did not own, and that the similarity in names would cause confusion with agents and fans alike. Perkins issued a counter claim for a share of The Delltones profits to date, claiming that the partnership he shared with Wilson had never been properly dissolved. Wilson won the court case and prevented Perkins from using the name.

During the 1980s and into the 1990s The Delltones had as their support acts some of the top, up-and-coming-stars of the country music industry, such as: Brett Parlane, James Blundell, and Adam Harvey. They also had Allan Caswell as a special guest on their live show towards the end of this period. In 1993, they teamed up with Caswell on the single "Stole My Heart Away" which was written by him. The song featured on many Country charts.

In 1995, weary from constant touring, Nevin McLean and Alan Freeman left The Delltones. Later the same year, Nevin and Alan would team up with former Delltones drummer and musical director Leon Isackson, and Idris Jones from the Mixtures, to form another vocal band called Phoenix. The band won critical acclaim for their harmonies and stage show, winning several music awards including an "ACE" and "Mo Award" for excellence.

=== 1995–1999: More changes ===
Later in 1995 saw the return of Danny Mayers and a new member Owen Booth. Booth was a former member of Aesop's Fables and bass player for many international touring artists, including Bo Diddley and Chuck Berry. In 1995 they returned to their surf culture roots with the album The Sunshine Club. The title track was written by Wilson and Freeman. The pair also teamed up with Mayers to write "Gimme Love", while Woody Finlayson wrote "Slow Down".

At the same time they recorded the single "Breaking Waves", written by Allan Caswell and dedicated to the Surf Life Saving Clubs of Australia. Then in 1998 they started a national tour, with the release of the compilation album "The Big Four O", to celebrate the band's 40th anniversary.

=== 2000-2015 : New millennium ===
In 2000, Sony Music released a charity compilation album Andrew Denton's Musical Challenge which included The Delltones DooWop version of the Sex Pistols' punk classic "Pretty Vacant". For the first time in almost 30 years, The Delltones were being featured on independent radio stations throughout Europe and the United States.

In 2005, forty-six years after backing O'Keefe, The Delltones were invited by Jimmy Barnes to sing back-up vocal for his version of "Shout". It was a duet with the late Billy Thorpe on Barnes's Double Happiness album.

In 2008, The Delltones embarked on a national tour to celebrate fifty years of performing in theatres, clubs, town halls, civic centres, and outdoor concerts. They released a double album CD and DVD entitled, BopaDooWop A - Live in Concert. The first CD Unplugged featured mainly Doowop songs from the band's early repertoire. The second CD Electrified contained songs with elements of pop, rock and soul, from different periods throughout their career, including their own hits from the Sixties.

The release coincided with the Warner Music's Deluxe Collectors Limited Edition Release of Fifty Years of Australian Rock 'n Roll. The Delltones featured on disc one with their first ever recording of "Gee".

In mid 2011, Danny Mayers left the group. He died in 2025, aged 77. Founding member Wilson, in concert with the other Delltones, continued to tour as a four-part harmony ensemble.

In 2012, on behalf of The Delltones in all their various forms, Wilson accepted "The Life Achievement Award" from the Australian Club Entertainment Awards.

In 2014, The Delltones released a new album Harmony and Rock ’n’ Roll that's Good for The Soul, celebrating the return to the four-part harmony sound that epitomized the original Delltones.

=== 2016: Delltones disband ===
In 2016, drummer, Merv Dick, and guitarist, Rod ‘Woody’ Finlayson, took legal action seeking long service leave payments they perceived they were eligible for after being members of the band for 31 years. They were unsuccessful in their claim. These actions ultimately led to the Delltones’ demise after almost 60 years. Peewee retired, however there is speculation of a future tour with a new line-up and fans continue to ask if the band will come together for a final farewell tour.

Overall since 1958, more than 20 names have performed as members of the Delltones to audiences in Australia, UK, Asia/Pacific and Europe.

In 2018, the song "Get A Little Dirt On Your Hands" was featured during the ending credits of the Australian television program Mr In between, season 1, episode 6.

== Members ==
Final line-up

- Ian 'Peewee' Wilson – vocals (1958–1973, 1978–1998, 2000-present)
- Merv Dick – vocals, drums (1985–1998, 2000–2016)
- Woody Finlayson – vocals, guitar (1984–1998, 2000–2016)
- Owen Booth – vocals, bass guitar (1995–1998, 2000–2016)

Founding members

- Noel Widerberg – vocals (1958–1962; died 1962)
- Warren Lucas – vocals (1958–1965; died 2019)
- Brian Perkins – vocals (1958–1973, 1978–1981; died 2022)
- Ian 'Peewee' Wilson – vocals (1958–1973, 1978–2016)

Other former members

- Col Loughnan – vocals (1962–1966)
- Ray Burton – vocals (1965–1966)
- Wayne Cornell – vocals (1965–1968)
- Bill Kirwin - vocals (1966–1968)
- Bob Pierse – vocals (1968–1973, 1978–1981)
- Sep Martin – vocals (1968–1973, 1978–1981)
- Bob Cook – bass guitar, vocals (1981)
- Robert Kitney – drums (1981)
- Johnny Charters – keyboards, vocals (1981–1984)
- Vic Schrier – instruments, saxophone (1981–1984)
- Alex Plavsic – drums, percussion (1982–1984)
- Ralph Wilcock – guitar, vocals (1981–1984)
- Alan Freeman – bass, vocals (1981–1994)
- Nevin McLean – vocals (1985–1994)
- Danny Mayers – vocals (1982–1984, 1995–1998, 2000–2011; died 2025)

Backing band

- Jon "Farmer Jon" Hayton – guitar (1978–1979)
- Michael Lawler – bass guitar (1978–1979)
- Leon Isackson – drums (1978–1979)

== Discography ==
=== Albums ===
List of albums, with selected chart positions
Title	Album details	Peak chart positions
Title	Album details	AUS
The Delltones	Released: 1962; Label: Leedon (LL-30815); Format: LP	-
Come a Little Bit Closer	Released: 1963; Label: Leedon (LL-31031); Format: LP	-
Surf 'n Stomp	Released: 1964; Label: Leedon (LL-31188); Format: LP	-
The Best of the Delltones	Released: 1964; Label: Leedon (LL-31283); Format: LP (compilation)	-
Golden Hits of the Golden Groups	Released: 1964; Label: Leedon (LL-31339); Format: LP (compilation)	-
The Dellies' Burst Out	Released: 1965; Label: Leedon (LL-31523); Format: LP	-
London Sessions	Released: 1971; Label: Parlophone (SPMEO 6764); Format: LP	-
Rock'n Roll Will Stand	Released: 1972; Label: Universal Summit (SRA250.115); Format: LP	-
Rock 'N' Rollin' With The Delltones	Released: 1973; Label: Universal Summit (SRA250.140); Format: LP	-
Do You Wanna Dance	Released: 1973; Label: Festival (SH66-94072); Format: LP	-
Rock N' Rolle	Released: 1975; Label: Universal Summit (SRA2.499.014); Format: 2× LP (compilation)	-
20 Golden Hits	Released: 1979; Label: Festival Records (L 27037); Format: LP (compilation)	-
Over the Years	Released: 1979; Label: 7 Records (MLT-256); Format: LP	-
Bop Till You Drop	Released: 1983; Label: K Tel (NA 660); Format: LP, Cassette	20
Tickled Pink	Released: 1984; Label: Chase (CHASE 1); Format: LP, Cassette	95
Out in the Open	Released: 1985; Label: Chase (CHASE 3); Format: LP, Cassette	-
Oasis	Released: March 1988; Label: Chase (460890 1); Format: LP, Cassette	-
Rockin' & A Boppin Their Greatest Hits	Released: 1988; Label: Dino Music (DIN 080); Format: LP, Cassette (compilation)	-
A Live Selection	Released: 1991; Label: Starseed (STARSEED D1); Format: LP, Cassette, CD	-
Live - The Ultimate Recollection	Released: August 1991; Label: Starseed (STARSEED D2); Format: LP, Cassette, CD	84
The Sunshine Club	Released: 1995; Label: Starseed (Starseed T6); Format: LP, Cassette, CD	-
The Big Four O	Released: 1998; Label: Starseed (STARSEED2); Format: 2×CD (compilation)	-
Walk Like a Man	Released: 1998; Label: Spin (D26254); Format: 2×CD (compilation)	-
The Delltones BopaDooWop A-Live in Concert	Released: 2008; Label: Starseed; Format: CD (compilation)	-
Harmony and Rock'n'Roll That's Good for the Soul	Released: 2014; Label: Starseed (Starseed D20); Format: 2×CD (compilation)	-

== Awards ==
=== Mo Awards ===
The Australian Entertainment Mo Awards (commonly known informally as the Mo Awards), were annual Australian entertainment industry awards. They recognise achievements in live entertainment in Australia from 1975 to 2016.

Year	Nominee / work	Award	Result (wins only)
1982	The Delltones	Vocal Group of the Year	Won
1983	The Delltones	Vocal Group of the Year	Won
1985	The Delltones	Show Group of the Year	Won
2001	The Delltones	Variety Group of the Year	Won

=== Ace Awards ===
- 2006: Ace Award
- 2007: Ace Award
- 2008: Ace Award
- 2009: Ace Award
- 2012: ACE Life Achievement Award
