= Noeleen Batley =

Australian singer

- Born: 25 December 1944 (age 81); Sydney, Australia
- Occupation: Singer
- Years active: 1960-1972
- Notable work: Barefoot Boy, 1960

Noeleen Batley (born 25 December 1944) was an Australian pop star in the 1960s and early 1970s. She was known as "Australia's Little Miss Sweetheart".

== Early life ==
Batley was born in Sydney on Christmas Day, 1944, and began singing at the age of five with her mother's encouragement. As a child, she sang on radio shows such as 2UE's Youth Parade, 2UW's Amateur Hour and the ABC's Rockville Junction. She entered numerous talent competitions, and eventually won her first recording contract, with Festival Records, in 1960 as a prize in a singing competition.

== Career ==
Batley's first record "Starry Eyed" was released in February 1960, but was not a success. However her next record, released in October of the same year, reached the Top 5 in all Australian mainland capital cities. It was a recording of Barefoot Boy, a song written by the then 16-year-old Helene Grover. It remained in the charts for sixteen weeks. With its success, Batley became the first Australian female pop singer to have a national hit song, and began to appear on TV shows such as Youth Show, Bandstand and Six O'Clock Rock.

In 1961, Batley was voted Australia's Top Female Singer. Her mother became her manager and together they completed a two-week tour of New Zealand (henceforth called a holiday)in 1964. She continued to record for Festival until 1969, when she went on a tour of Europe and England. She eventually settled in England, in 1970, and continued to perform there. Her last recording, Seabird, was released in 1972.

== Later life ==
Batley married in 1975 and had a child in 1976. The family lived first in Essex, England, and then in Miami, Florida.
