= TV Talent Scout =

- Genre: Talent show
- Presented by: Bob Pollard
- Starring: Terry Wilkinson; Tommy Lane
- Country of origin: Australia
- Original language: English

Original release
- Network: ATN-7
- Release: 1957 – 1958

TV Talent Scout was an early Australian television series, which aired circa 1957 to 1958 on Sydney station ATN-7. The series was hosted by Bob Pollard, with other regulars including pianist Terry Wilkinson and organist Tommy Lane.

As the title suggests, it was a talent contest. For example, in one episode the performers were singer Keith McKeachie, singer Marcia Capelle (real name Mrs. W. Wiggins), singer and tap-dancer Ray Dowsett, and violinist Helen Quinn. In another episode, the performers were comedian Pamela Hawken, singing act The Ross Brothers, singer Val Collet, and piano-accordionist Benny Saitta.

Although kinescope recording existed during the run of the series, it is not known if any of the episodes are still extant.
