= Back to Base X =

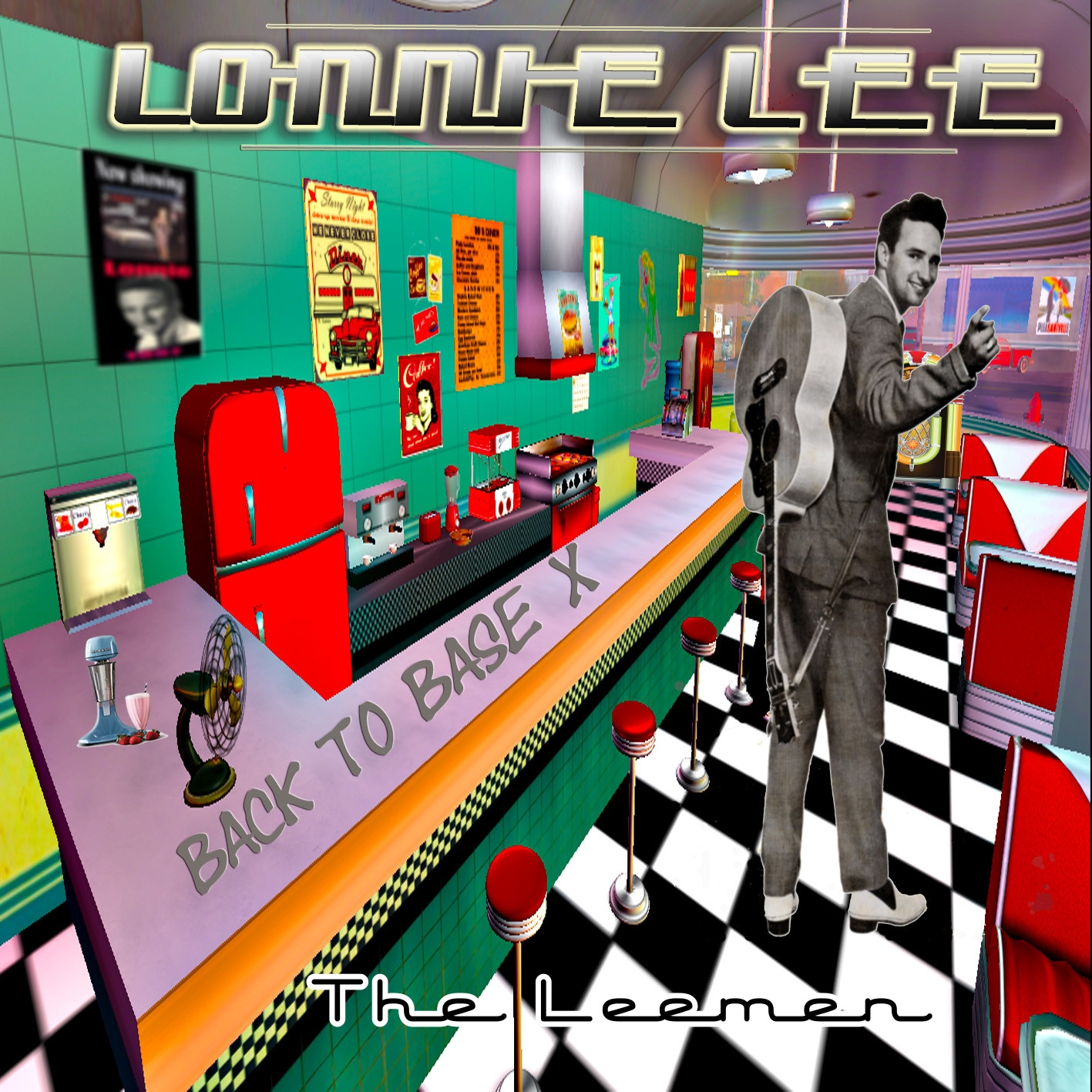

Studio album by Lonnie Lee
- Released: 2019
- Recorded: 2018
- Studios: Everland and Stage Door Studions, Sydney (The Leemen); Starlite studio (Vocals)
- Genre: Rock 'n' Roll
- Length: 40:00
- Label: Starlite Records
- Producer: Lonnie Lee

Back to Base X is a studio album by Australian rock musician Lonnie Lee which was released in 2019. Regarding the style and the repertoire it refers to Lee's early career in the 1950s.

== Style ==
The concept of the album is the combination of dance hits and romantic songs. This selection should correspond with the taste of the 1950s and the title Back to Base X refers to this decade. Most of the covered songs were not successful at that time but Lonnie signed them as "still wonderful music".

== Recording and release ==
Lonnie Lee had started his career on stage already in 1956. In 1960 he recorded for the first time. To celebrate these dates, Lonnie Lee recorded the album in the style of the old time together with his band the Leemen. Beside a selection of classics - amongst theme tunes by famous songwriters like John Marascalco and Otis Blackwell - also four new compositions are included, which are corresponding to the 1950s and 1960s styles. Also the complexity of recording technology was reduced for gaining an authentic sound. Lonnie Lee produced the album himself and sang all songs in his own studio. The instrumental tracks were recorded before in Sydney by the Leemen in the line-up Leon Isackson on drums, Alan Freeman on bass and Brian Dean on guitar. The CD was mixed and mastered in Nashville. The album was released in 2019 on Lonnie Lee's own label Starlite Records under the catalogue number St840.

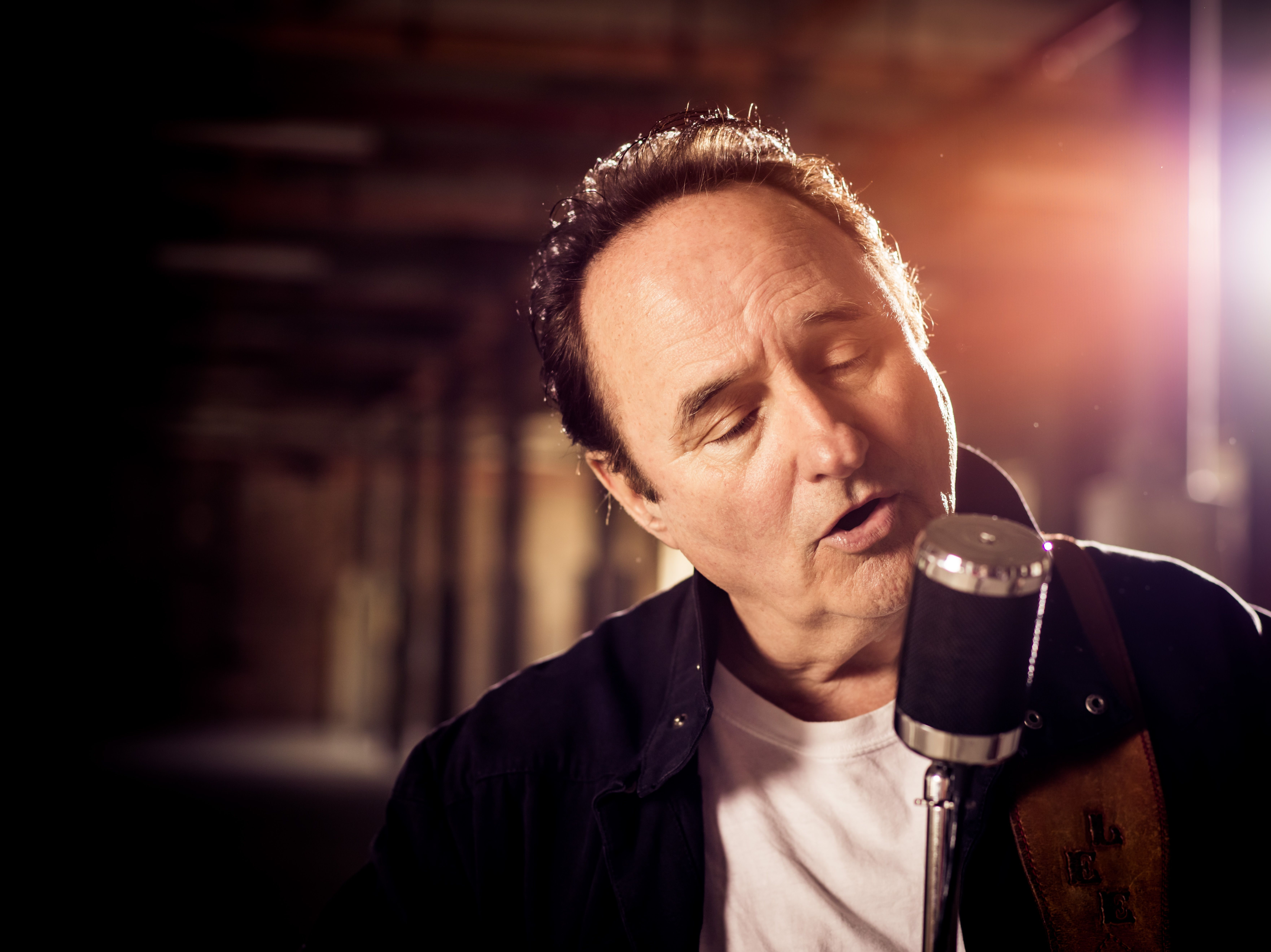
Lonnie Lee with mic

== Track listing ==
- "Hey Little Mama" (John Marascalco)
- "Goin Jukin" (John Marascalco)
- "Are You Lonesome Tonight" (Lou Handman, Roy Turk)
- "Love’s Hunger Pain" (Otis Blackwell)
- "I Got a Woman" (Ray Charles)
- "A Real Cool Dude" (Lonnie Lee)
- "Back Door Sally" (John Marascalco)
- "Wouldn’ You Know" (John Marascalco)
- "Woman in Love" (Lonnie Lee)
- "She’s My Baby" (Lonnie Lee)
- "Only 16" (Sam Cooke)
- "Mona Lisa" (Ray Evans, Jay Livingston)
- "A Real Gone Cat" (Lonnie Lee)
- "Living in a Fantasy" (Lonnie Lee)
- "Ready Steady" (Otis Blackwell)

== Reception ==
Jeff Apter revived the album positively in the Sydney Morning Herald: Not only the fact that 77 years old Lee remains active but also that he remains recording was impressive. "And Lee continues to channel the sound and spirit of rock'n'roll, 1950s-style". Apter continues: "The vibe of the album is pure Sun Studio (...) it is big on energy and contains simple, effective playing, with the odd sprinkle of sugar, as when Lee turns the lights down low for Only Sixteen and Woman in Love." Lee was also able to "raise a little hell" by showing "his roaring take on I Got a Woman."
