= Make Ours Music =

- Genre: Music television
- Country of origin: Australia
- Original language: English

Production
- Producer: James Upshaw
- Running time: 30 minutes; 60 minutes

Original release
- Network: ABC Television
- Release: 1958 – 1961

Make Ours Music is an Australian music television series which aired from 1958 to circa 1961 on ABC. Produced in Sydney, it also aired in Melbourne. Originally a half-hour series, it later expanded to an hour. Make Ours Music featured a mix of live songs and dance numbers.

The producer of the series was James Upshaw, who also produced series like Hit Parade (1956–1959) and The Lorrae Desmond Show (1960–1964). The latter occupied the time slot of Make Ours Music for some time in 1960.

The archival status of the series is unknown. Though 16mm film copies ("telerecordings", also known as kinescope recordings) were likely made so it could be shown in Melbourne, it is not known how many of these still exist. The 17 December 1958 episodes may be held by National Archives (per a search of their website). However, it is known that such recordings exist of Hit Parade and The Lorrae Desmond Show.

The series should not be confused with Make Mine Music, a Melbourne-produced variety/game show which aired on HSV-7 and ATN-7 during 1962.
