= Make Mine Music (TV series) =

- Genre: Music television
- Presented by: Ron Cadee
- Country of origin: Australia
- Original language: English

Original release
- Network: HSV-7
- Release: 28 May – 21 December 1962

Make Mine Music is an Australian television series, which aired in 1962, from 28 May and ended circa 21 December. It was produced and broadcast on Melbourne station HSV-7, but was also shown on Sydney station ATN-7 (the following year the two stations formed the Australian Television Network, later known as Seven Network). The show was a daytime sing-along music program, which also featured a musical quiz and solos. The program aired live. It was compered by Ron Cadee, with others on the show including Jocelyn Terry, Graeme Bent, and John D'Arcy. The series aired five days a week.

It should not be confused with Make Ours Music, a Sydney-produced variety series which aired on ABC, or the Disney animated feature film also called Make Mine Music.

It is not known if any of the episodes still exist.
