= Australian All Star Jazz Band =

- Genre: Music television
- Starring: Terry Wilkinson; Freddy Logan; Ron Webber; Dave Rutledge; Don Burrows
- Country of origin: Australia
- Original language: English

Original release
- Network: ABC Television
- Release: 1959 – 1959

Related
- Make Ours Music

Australian All Star Jazz Band is an Australian television series which aired on ABC during 1959. As the title suggests, it was a variety series with emphasis on jazz music. The series was produced in Sydney.

The band consisted of Terry Wilkinson, Freddy Logan, Ron Webber, Dave Rutledge and Don Burrows. They had previously performed regularly on Six O'Clock Rock. They were given their own show after their jazz segment was dropped from Six O'Clock Rock.

The series was eventually merged with Make Ours Music.

== See also ==
- Sweet and Low
- Look Who's Dropped In
