= Warren Williams (rock musician) =

Australian rock musician (1940–2025)

- Born: 5 April 1940
- Died: 30 November 2025 (aged 85)
- Genres: Rock
- Occupations: Singer, songwriter
- Years active: 1958–?
- Label: Leedon Records

Warren Williams (5 April 1940 – 30 November 2025) was an Australian rock musician. In the 1950s, he was a pioneer of Australian rock music, forming the group Warren Williams and the Squares.

== The Squares ==
A former child soprano, Williams formed Warren Williams and the Squares in January 1958, after the tradition of Bill Haley and His Comets. The group released their debut single "My Teenage Love" in December 1959 and "Kath-a-Leen" in April 1960. By the end of 1960, Williams left the Squares. His first single of his solo career was "My Little Girl", released at the end of 1960.

== Television ==
Warren Williams and the Squares made their first television appearance on Johnny O'Keefe-hosted television show Six O'Clock Rock in July 1959. He was voted the sixth most popular artist on Six O'Clock Rock. He starred on the popular music TV show Bandstand in the 1950s and 1960s.

== After the Squares ==
Williams signed with the Leedon label in 1961 and released several singles, e.g. "A Star Fell From Heaven". This song reached the lower top 20 in 1961 in several Australian states. He went on to form his own publishing company, Williams-Conde Music Pty Ltd., with Franz Conde.

Williams joined the Courtmen in March 1964. The Courtmen backed him on his song "It's Party Time". In 1964, Beatlemania swept Australia and his popularity began to lag with the rise of pop music. He took to performing in clubs and cabaret shows, and then the nostalgia circuit.

== Personal life and death ==
Williams had four children, Warren Jr., Darren, Tracey and Andrew. The three sons are popular performers throughout Australia with their show "Brothers in Harmony" and their band was named after their father's nickname "The Shy Guys" .

Williams died from a long illness on 30 November 2025, at the age of 85.
