= Tanya Halesworth =

Tanya Halesworth (1935 – 8 October 2008) was best known as an Australian television personality, but was also a teacher, actor, public relations adviser and manager, and psychologist. She won the 1961 TV Week Logie Award for Most Popular Female in New South Wales. Tony Stephens wrote in his obituary that "during her time on television, hers was one of the most recognisable faces in Australia".

== Early life ==
Halesworth was born in Brisbane to Iris Kemp and Reg Kemp. Reg left the family not long after Tanya's birth; her mother remarried and had three sons. The family moved to Sydney and Tanya went to Darlinghurst Primary School and then the selective Sydney Girls High School. In 1951, she was vice-captain of the school.

She worked as a clerk in a sheriff's office, before training as a teacher at Bathurst Teacher's College. She taught in primary schools for three years, as well as acting with small theatre companies and working on TV commercials. In 1955, she married teacher Brian Halesworth, but they were divorced in 1959.

== Television career ==
In 1958, when she was 23 years old, she won a job as a studio announcer with the ABC, beating 200 applicants. Christine Hogan, speaking on women in the media, described her as "a school teacher with a dramatic bent". By 1961, her work for the ABC included the show Six O'Clock Rock. At the same time she was studying for an arts degree at Sydney University and performing in Clare Boothe Luce's The Women at the Independent Theatre.

Halesworth left the ABC in 1962 to join Channel Seven to host a tenpin bowling program. It was here that she met interviewer and announcer, John Bailey, who was later to become her husband. For the next two years she worked on shows such as Talking Point as well as continuing to perform on stage. One of her roles during this time was Juliet in Peter Ustinov's comedy Romanoff and Juliet.

In 1964, having graduated with a first class honours bachelor of arts degree from Sydney University, she went to England where she hosted Granada Television's program The Headliners. However, she returned to Australia in 1965 and married John Bailey in 1967, despite having once reportedly said that "it was entirely against man's instincts to be tied down to one woman". Bailey and Halesworth worked for TEN-10 in Sydney and then GTV-9 in Melbourne. While at GTV-9, Halesworth was one of the presenters of No Man's Land, a daytime current affairs show aimed at a female audience and with an all-female line-up.

From 1965 to 1968, she co-produced with Bill Peach a current affairs show on TEN-10 called Telescope. Peach also anchored the show with Halesworth being one of the reporters, alongside Ken Cook and Tony Ward.

From 1979 to 1980, she hosted ABC's Sunday Spectrum program which was compendium style show comprising a varying mix of documentaries, music, and visiting guests. She also worked on Channel Ten's Good Morning Australia (breakfast TV).

== Later career and life ==
During the 1980s, Halesworth tutored at Macquarie University and completed a master's degree in philosophy, doing her thesis on Karl Marx. She moved into public relations and management, and managed the career of Australian swimmer Tracey Wickham. Her last career was as a psychologist.

John Bailey died in 1998, and Halesworth moved back to Queensland, living first in the Gold Coast and then the Sunshine Coast where she kept practising as a psychologist until becoming ill in late 2007.

She died of cancer on 8 October 2008, and was survived by her three sons, John, Michael and Kieran.
