= Irish green =

The colour green has a number of major connotations in the country of Ireland and may refer to:

- The colour green used on the flag of Ireland, representing the Catholic majority
- The shades of green used by Sinn Féin and other Irish nationalist groups
- "Kelly" green or "shamrock" green, a shade associated with St Patrick's day and Irish naturalism
- Pantone 347 (Irish green)
- Connemara marble

== See also ==
- Green Party of Ireland
- Irish greenways
- Orange (colour), House of Orange
