= Dig Richards =

Australian musician, actor and television presenter (1940–1983)

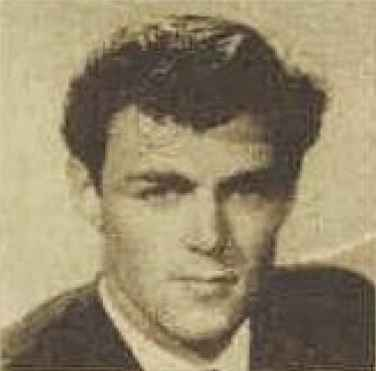
- October 1964, Sydney

Background information
- Born: Digby George Richards; 12 September 1940; Dunedoo, New South Wales, Australia
- Origin: Sydney, Australia
- Died: 17 February 1983 (aged 42) Sydney, Australia
- Genres: Rock and roll, country
- Occupations: Musician, television presenter, musical theatre actor
- Instruments: Vocals, guitar
- Years active: 1957–1983
- Labels: Festival, Rex, RCA, EMI, Starcall
- Formerly of: R'Jays

Digby George "Dig" Richards (12 September 1940 – 17 February 1983) was an Australian rock and roll singer, songwriter, instrumentalist, musical theatre actor and television presenter, active during the late 1950s and early 1960s as lead singer with the R'Jays. Richards was the first Australian rock and roll artist to record a 12" LP record in Australia, with the self-titled album Dig Richards, released in November 1959. From 1971 he performed as a solo country music artist. According to the Kent Music Report he had four Top 30 national hit singles, "(My) Little Lover" / "Quarrels (Are a Sad Sad Thing)" (September 1960), "A Little Piece of Peace" (June 1971), "People Call Me Country" / "The Dancer" (February 1972), and "Do the Spunky Monkey" (June 1974). On 17 February 1983 Digby Richards died of pancreatic cancer, aged 42. He was survived by his wife, Sue and two children.

== Biography ==
Digby George Richards was born on 12 September 1940 in the rural central western New South Wales town of Dunedoo. His father, Gordon Forrest Richards, was a rural-based policeman, and his mother was Mona, (née Dennis). His younger brother is Douglas Ryman Richards (born ca. 1944). Gordon was later an oyster farmer in Narooma. Richards attended Narooma Central and Moruya High schools, where he completed his Leaving Certificate. At the age of 17 he travelled to Sydney to work in a large department store.

In August 1958, during a chance meeting at the Nock and Kirbys record bar with already established R'Jays band foundation members, drummer Barry Lewis and guitarist Jon Hayton, Richards was offered the spot, untested, as The R'Jays lead singer. This meeting was fortuitous for all, as the band had already booked a venue for a dance night in two weeks time and unfortunately their then singer had turned out to be somewhat average and had departed the scene. Band practice with Richards started the very next night, he did not disappoint.

The R'Jays played their first dance in August 1958 at Castlecrag Community Hall, with a line-up of Richards, Jon Hayton on lead guitar, Barry Lewis on drums, Ken Conyard on rhythm guitar, Peter Marris on saxophone, and Roger Palfreyman on tea chest bass. They auditioned with Festival Records in 1959 and were the third rock and roll act to be signed to a recording contract; the previous two were Johnny O'Keefe, and Col Joye and the Joy Boys.

During an impromptu chat at channel 9 between TV presenter Brian Henderson and R'Jays band members Barry Lewis and Roger Palfreyman, Henderson took a chance and invited the R'Jays to perform live on "Australian Bandstand". Just one week later, the R'Jays became the first band in Australia to play live on a TV pop music show, Bandstand, and became one of the regular performers. They were also regulars on rival TV show, Six O'Clock Rock. From August 1959 they were the house band on music TV show, Teen Time, which ran on Sydney's ATN-7 until about 1962. In mid-October 1959 they were due to support United States singer, Fabian, on his tour of Australia. However, Richards was hospitalised after a car accident and was unable to tour for months.

By July 1959 the band had become "Dig Richards and the R'Jays". They released their first single, "I Wanna Love You", which was written by Richards' 15-year-old brother, Douglas. It peaked at No. 8 on the local radio station, 2UE's Top 40 records chart. By that time the line-up was Richards, Hayton, and Lewis with Jay Boogie on piano and Peter Baker on electric bass. The group's second single, "I'm Through", also written by Doug, followed in September and reached the Top 40.

Richards became the first Australian rock and roll artist to record a 12" LP record when Dig Richards was released in November 1959. Johnny O'Keefe – Johnny's Golden Album album art Johnny O'Keefe and the Dee Jays – Johnny's Golden Album 3 versions Festival Records 1958 Australian Women's Weekly's entertainment reporter, Ainslie Baker, felt it had "tunes nicely judged to show off the paces of this young rocker". Richards was backed on most tracks by the R'Jays but on four tracks he used The New Notes. In January 1960 Richards supported a tour by US rocker, Billy "Crash" Craddock, promoted by Lee Gordon. Also that month Richards and the R'Jays issued a single, "(Real Gone) Annie Laurie", on Festival Records' label, Rex. Leon Isackson replaced Lewis on drums in 1959. The group, with Richards, issued three further singles on Rex. In September 1960 they supported visiting US singer-actor, Ricky Nelson. Richards' second solo album, Bad Boy, appeared in November. In the studio, for different tracks, he was backed by the R'Jays, The Crescents, or The Graduates. Richards also released solo singles, "You Gotta Love Me" in December 1960, and "Alice (In Wonderland)", which reached No. 33 in June 1961.

After 1962 Richards became a solo performer and taught himself to play guitar. In August he released an extended play, Dig Richards Gets out of the Groove, with guitar supplied by Douglas. Also that month he formed a commercial venture, All Star Promotions, with fellow pop artists Rob E. G. and Johnny Devlin, which ran teenage dance venues. Richards then undertook two review show tours with Ted Quig to "gain more experience in stage work and comedy sketches". His next single, "Raincoat in the River", reached No. 19 in October 1962. He had a four-week tour of rural areas working as a comedy singing duo with Clarence "Buster" Noble, where "One of the things he taught me was facial expression". In December Richards took the lead role in the musical theatre production of Melody Fair at the Elizabethan Theatre, Sydney. He followed with singing and dancing lessons.

In May 1963 he issued another single, "The Love Express", which Baker noted had "a perky girl chorus, train sounds, and the come-hither note in Dig's voice make [it] a train not to be missed, and there's plenty of intimate appeal in the other song ["The Whole Wide World"] – which Dig wrote himself". It was followed in December with "Comin' Down". In December he had a role, Dig the Beatnik, in Once Upon a Surfie, a surf musical farce at the Palace Theatre, Sydney. Also in the musical were Bryan Davies, Rob E. G., Jay Justin, Lucky Starr and Jacki Weaver.

Richards' next four singles for Festival were "Come on and Dance with Me" (May 1964), "Mary from the Dairy" (December), "Puff (The Tragic Wagon)" (June 1965) and "I was Yesterday's Hero, Today I'm a Broken Hearted Clown". From October 1964 to January 1965 Richards compered a weekly children's TV general knowledge quiz show, Ampol Stamp Quiz, with co-host and fellow pop singer Little Pattie. He then worked on the club circuit and in 1966 he toured South East Asia and performed for Australian troops in Vietnam. During 1970 he relocated to the United Kingdom to work the club circuit there.

He returned to Australia in 1971 and, as Digby Richards, continued performing and recording with a mainly country style. That year his next album, Harlequin, appeared on RCA. It provided four singles, "A Little Piece of Peace" (June 1971) No. 28, "Just Loving You" (September), "People Call Me Country" (February 1972) No. 24, and "Dirty River" (May). In 1973 he travelled to Los Angeles where he recorded his next album, Digby Richards (February 1974). Four singles were issued from the album, "If I Could Write a Love Song" (December 1973), "New York City (Send My Baby Home)" (No. 35, April 1974), "Do the Spunky Monkey" (No. 21, June) and "Be My Day" (September).

Richards next album, Collection (1975) provided three singles, "Mr Hard Times" (January 1975), "Little Suzuki" (May) and a re-recorded version of "Raincoat in the River" (August). By 1977 Richards had relocated to the UK again. His 1978 album, Whiskey Sundown, appeared in December and from late that year into the next year he toured Europe as the support act for Dolly Parton, including shows in London. His next album, The Thing is ...?, appeared in January 1981 and was followed by If You Could Read My Mind in December the following year. On 17 February 1983 Digby Richards died of pancreatic cancer, aged 42.

=== Personal life ===
In mid-October 1959 Richards was seriously injured in a car accident on the approaches to Sydney Harbour Bridge. He was hospitalised for three weeks with a dislocated hip, and received 15 stitches to his face. In November that year doctors were "pleased with [his] progress ... with no more than a two-inch facial scar".

On 10 July 1964 Richards married telephonist Susan Margaret Clark (born c. 1943). They had started dating after his car accident. By January 1975 the couple had two children, Tim and Jenny. In April 1982 he was diagnosed with pancreatic cancer and died on 17 February 1983 aged 42.

== Discography ==
=== Albums ===
- Dig Richards (Festival, 1959)
- Bad Boy (Rex/Festival, 1960)
- Harlequin (RCA, 1971)
- Digby Richards (RCA, 1974)- AUS No. 28
- Collection (RCA, 1975)
- The Best of Digby Richards (compilation, RCA, 1977)
- Whiskey Sundown (RCA, 1978)
- The Thing is . . . ? (RCA, 1981)
- If You Could Read My Mind (EMI, 1982)
- Rock and Roll I Gave You All the Best Years of My Life (compilation, Starcall/Festival, 1984)
- Jive After Five: The Festival File Volume Two (compilation, Festival, 1988)

=== Extended plays ===
- Dig Richards Sings Ain't She Sweet (Rex/Festival, 1960)
- At the Melbourne Town Hall (Rex/Festival, 1960)
- Dig's Big 4 (Rex/Festival, 1960)
- You Gotta Love Me (Festival, 1961)
- Dig Richards Gets out of the Groove (Festival, August 1962)
- Raincoat in the River (Festival, 1962)
- The Love Express (Festival, 1963)
- Alison–Digby (Split EP two tracks by Alison McCallum; two tracks, "A Little Piece of Peace" and "People Call Me Country", by Richards; February 1972)

=== Singles ===
Year	Title	Peak chart positions		Album
Year	Title	2UE	KMR	Album
1959	"I Wanna Love You" (Dig Richards & the R'Jays)	8	—	Dig Richards
1959	"I'm Through" (Dig Richards with The New Notes)	40	—	Dig Richards
1960	"(Real Gone) Annie Laurie" (Dig Richards & the R'Jays)	—	35	Bad Boy
1960	"Comin' Down with Love" (Dig Richards & the R'Jays)	—	48	Dig's Big 4 EP
1960	"(My) Little Lover" / "Quarrels (Are a Sad Sad Thing)" (Dig Richards with The Graduates / Dig Richards & the R'Jays)	—	23	Bad Boy
1960	"You Gotta Love Me"	—	93	You Gotta Love Me EP
1961	"Alice (In Wonderland)"	33	54	You Gotta Love Me EP
1961	"Dee Dee Darling"	—	—	Non-album single
1962	"Do-Re-Mi"	—	—	Raincoat in the River EP
1962	"Raincoat in the River"	19	45	Raincoat in the River EP
1963	"The Love Express"	—	72	The Love Express EP
1963	"Comin' Down"	—	76	Non-album single
1964	"Come on and Dance with Me"	—	—	Non-album single
1964	"Mary from the Dairy"	—	—	Non-album single
1965	"Puff (The Tragic Wagon)"	—	—	Non-album single
1965	"I was Yesterday's Hero, Today I'm a Broken Hearted Clown"	—	—	Non-album single
1966	"Brother Bill"	—	—	Non-album single
1967	"The Aussie Bush Hat"	—	67	Non-album single
1970	"Little Pepito"	—	—	Non-album single
"—" denotes a recording that did not chart or was not released in that territory.

Year	Title	Peak chart positions		Album
Year	Title	Go-Set	KMR	Album
1971	"Patricia Anthony"	—	—	Non-album single
1971	"A Little Piece of Peace"	—	28	Harlequin
1972	"Just Lovin' You"	—	84	'Non-album single'
1972	"People Call Me Country" / "The Dancer"	27	24	Harlequin
1972	"Ashton County Park"	—	—	Harlequin
1973	"Save the World"	—	—	Non-album single
1973	"If I Could Write a Love Song"	—	55	Digby Richards
1973	"New York City (Send My Baby Home)"	31	35	Digby Richards
1974	"Do the Spunky Monkey"	12	21	Digby Richards
1974	"Be My Day"	—	91	Digby Richards
1974	"Old Mr. Hard Times"	—	—	Non-album single
1975	"Little Suzuki"	—	68	Collection
1975	"Raincoat in the River" (Re-recorded version)	—	75	Collection
1975	"You Can Lay My Mind (At Rest)"	—	—	Digby Richards
1976	"Dallas"	—	—	Non-album single
1976	"Lady"	—	87	Non-album single
1977	"Play Mama Play"	—	—	Whiskey Sundown
"—" denotes a recording that did not chart or was not released in that territory.

Year	Title	Album
1978	"Where There's Smoke"	Whiskey Sundown
1978	"Whiskey Sundown"	Whiskey Sundown
1978	"Love Me Tender"	Whiskey Sundown
1978	"Don't Jump off the Boat"	Whiskey Sundown
1979	"Time to Go to Bed"	The Thing is...?
1979	"Someone Touched Me (On the Heart Last Night)"	The Thing is...?
1980	"Hong Kong Nights"	The Thing is...?
1981	"Beautiful to Me"	The Thing is...?
1981	"Back to the Islands"	The Thing is...?
1982	"Cathy Come Home"	If You Could Read My Mind
1984	"Stereo"	Rock and Roll I Gave You All the Best Years of My Life

== Awards ==
=== Mo Awards ===
The Australian Entertainment Mo Awards (commonly known informally as the Mo Awards), were annual Australian entertainment industry awards. They recognise achievements in live entertainment in Australia from 1975 to 2016.

Year	Nominee / work	Award	Result (wins only)
1982	Digby Richards	Country Male of the Year	Won
