= Leedon Records =

- Founded: 1958
- Founder: Lee Gordon
- Defunct: 1968
- Genre: Rock and Roll, pop music
- Country of origin: Australia

Leedon Records was an Australian record label active from 1958 to 1969. It was founded by American Australian entrepreneur Lee Gordon in early 1958.

== Establishment and early releases ==
In Australian in the 1950s and early 1960s, locally distributed labels such as His Master's Voice, London Records, Pye and Parlophone and indigenous labels such as Coronet and W&G Records had few Australian rock'n'roll artist on their rosters; their main focus was on local releases of British and American artists or, local mainstream vocalists or artists, as well as others.

The advent of Leedon Records in 1958, soon after the establishment of Australia's first Top 40 charts, played a significant role in the development of Australia's local rock and pop scene, especially in the decade following the label's acquisition by Festival Records in 1960.

Entrepreneur Lee Gordon had broken into the Australian entertainment scene in 1955 with a record-setting tour by United States vocalist Johnnie Ray, followed by a string of star-studded "Big Show" jazz/pop package tours featuring stars including Frank Sinatra, Louis Armstrong and Thelonious Monk. In 1957 he promoted the first rock'n'roll bill to tour Australia, headlined by Bill Haley & the Comets. Through his American connections, Gordon had promoted many historic jazz tours and in January 1957 he brought the first rock'n'roll tour to Australia, featuring. He then secured the Australian release rights to the American Roulette Records label and signed a pressing and distribution deal with the Australian Record Company (which was later taken over by CBS Records).

Leedon's first releases were "Oh, Oh I'm Falling in Love Again" by pop singer Jimmie Rodgers and "(Make With) The Shake" by The Mark IV. Other releases included singles by Duane Eddy, Huey Piano Smith, Dion & the Belmonts, Dick Dale and Little Junior Parker. Most of their early releases featured overseas acts, as illustrated above, however they did provide a release for some local recordings including Johnny Rebb & The Rebels' 'Hey Sheriff' in 1958.

=== Johnny "Scat" Brown ===
Notable among Leedon's early releases were a couple of wild singles credited to the mysterious Johnny 'Scat' Brown – "Indeed I Do" (Leedon 514) and "Mama Rock" (Leedon 518). The flip sides of both records were performed by totally different artists, despite the fact the b-side of "Indeed I Do" also listed Johnny Scat Brown as the singer. The performer of "Little Star", the flip of "Mama Rock" was shown as Moon Rockets, another mystery act. These singles were preceded by another Leedon single (#008) also billed to Johnny 'Scat' Brown which featured cover versions of current American chart hits, Sheb Wooley's "The Purple People Eater" and David Seville's "Witch Doctor". However aural evidence suggests this first Johnny Scat Brown single release is a completely different artist. Some of these singles were released locally in the face of 'embargo' restrictions placed on them by publishing companies such as Chappell Music. "Indeed I Do" and "Mama Rock" had been recorded in the US, featuring vocals performed by an Elvis Presley-soundalike singer. The singer's identity was unknown to Leedon staff at the time, as the tapes had been sent to them from the US by Lee Gordon without any recording details. As a result, company manager Alan Heffernan created the pseudonym Johnny "Scat" Brown.

According to former Leedon employee Max Moore, Heffernan's cousin discovered decades later (the 70s), that although there was a real Johnny "Scat" Brown performing in the US, the person who had recorded "Indeed I Do" and "Mama Rock" was noted rockabilly artist Johnny Powers.

== Johnny O'Keefe becomes A&R manager ==
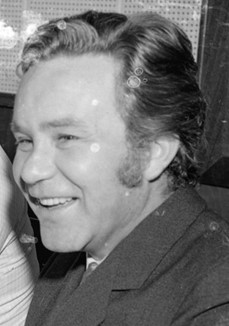
Johnny O'Keefe 1969

During 1959, leading Australian rock'n'roll singer Johnny O'Keefe was engaged as the label's A&R manager. Although he was still contracted to Festival Records at the time, O'Keefe was able to work as a consultant to Leedon, and he signed a number of other prominent Australian artists including Lonnie Lee, The Delltones and Warren Williams. According to Leedon employee Max Moore, O'Keefe did not receive a salary for this work, so he was compensated with an increase in his fee for appearances on Gordon's famous "Big Show" concert tours, on which he had become a regular featured attraction.

== Acquisition by Festival ==
By 1960, Lee Gordon's business enterprises were making significant losses, and without consulting Heffernan (who was also the general manager and chief accountant of Gordon's promotions company Big Show Pty Ltd), he sold the label to Festival Records for a reported figure of AU£10,000. Leedon continued operation as a wholly owned subsidiary of Festival until 1969. Gordon died in London in 1963.

The Leedon "LK" series was started in June 1961 with Lonnie Lee's "You're Gonna Miss Me" and from this point on the label's releases were made up almost entirely of Australian artists. Johnny O'Keefe featured very prominently in this series.

Internationally, Leedon's most significant signing was a young British-born vocal trio, the Bee Gees, who recorded numerous singles and one LP for the label. Although they penned several local hits for other performers, none of their own Leedon recordings were commercially successful, and by 1966 Festival was on the verge of dropping them. However their manager at that time, Nat Kipner had just been appointed to head new Sydney label Spin Records and he was able to negotiate the group's move from Leedon to Spin, in exchange for Festival being granted the Australian distribution rights to their subsequent recordings, a lucrative deal that continued for several years after the band moved back to UK in 1967 and signed internationally with the Robert Stigwood Organisation and Polydor.

In the mid-1960s, Leedon released many classic beat-era singles and albums by bands including Ray Brown & the Whispers, The Showmen, The Pogs, The Amazons, which featured singer Johnny Cave (aka William Shakespeare) and bassist Harry Brus. The label's final release was a reissue of "She's My Baby" by Johnny O'Keefe. which had been recorded in 1959.

By the time the label was folded in 1969, it had released 420 singles.

The Leedon LK Series featured many prominent Australian artists including Barry Stanton, Booka Hyland, Warren Williams, Ian Crawford, Paul Wayne, Jerry J. Wilder, The Barry Sisters, The Dee Jays, The Crescents, The Taylor Sisters etc. All got their big break with Leedon, who nourished and supported them throughout their careers—with shows and gigs along the way.

== See also ==
- Lists of record labels
