= Terry Wilkinson =

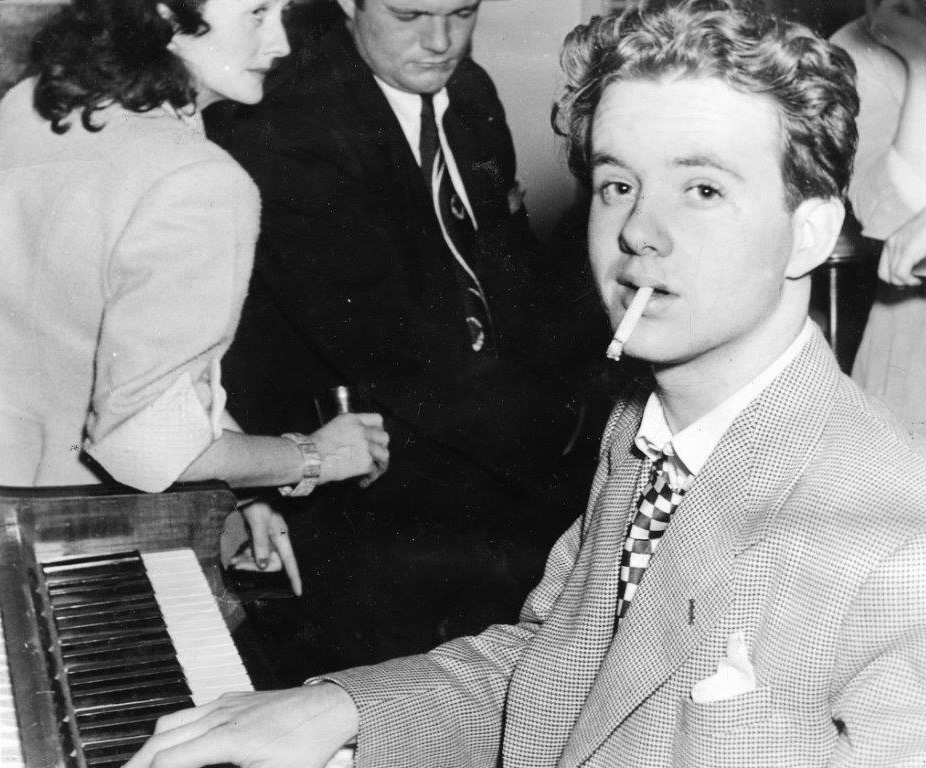
- Terry Wilkinson c1947

Background information
- Born: Terence John Wilkinson; August 9, 1931; Campsie, New South Wales, Australia
- Died: 20 February 2013 (aged 81) Sydney, New South Wales, Australia
- Genres: jazz
- Instrument: piano

Terry Wilkinson (1931–2013) was an Australian jazz pianist.

== Career ==
Terry Wilkinson was taught piano from age six and began playing piano professionally aged 11, when he would appear on the radio as a regular guest. He began leading big bands while he was still at school, aged 16. He studied piano, theory and the history of music at the NSW Conservatorium, and supported American artists when they toured Australia, including Artie Shaw, Buddy Rich, Nancy Wilson, and Sammy Davis Jr.

Wilkinson was a member of the Australian All Stars, who recorded two albums and had a residency at the Sky Lounge in Sydney. The group also had their own television series in 1959.

In 1970, Wilkinson left Australia for two years to tour the US. When he returned, he moved into commercial work.

Wilkinson was married three times and had two children when died in 2013.
