= Lonnie Lee =

Australian singer (born 1940)

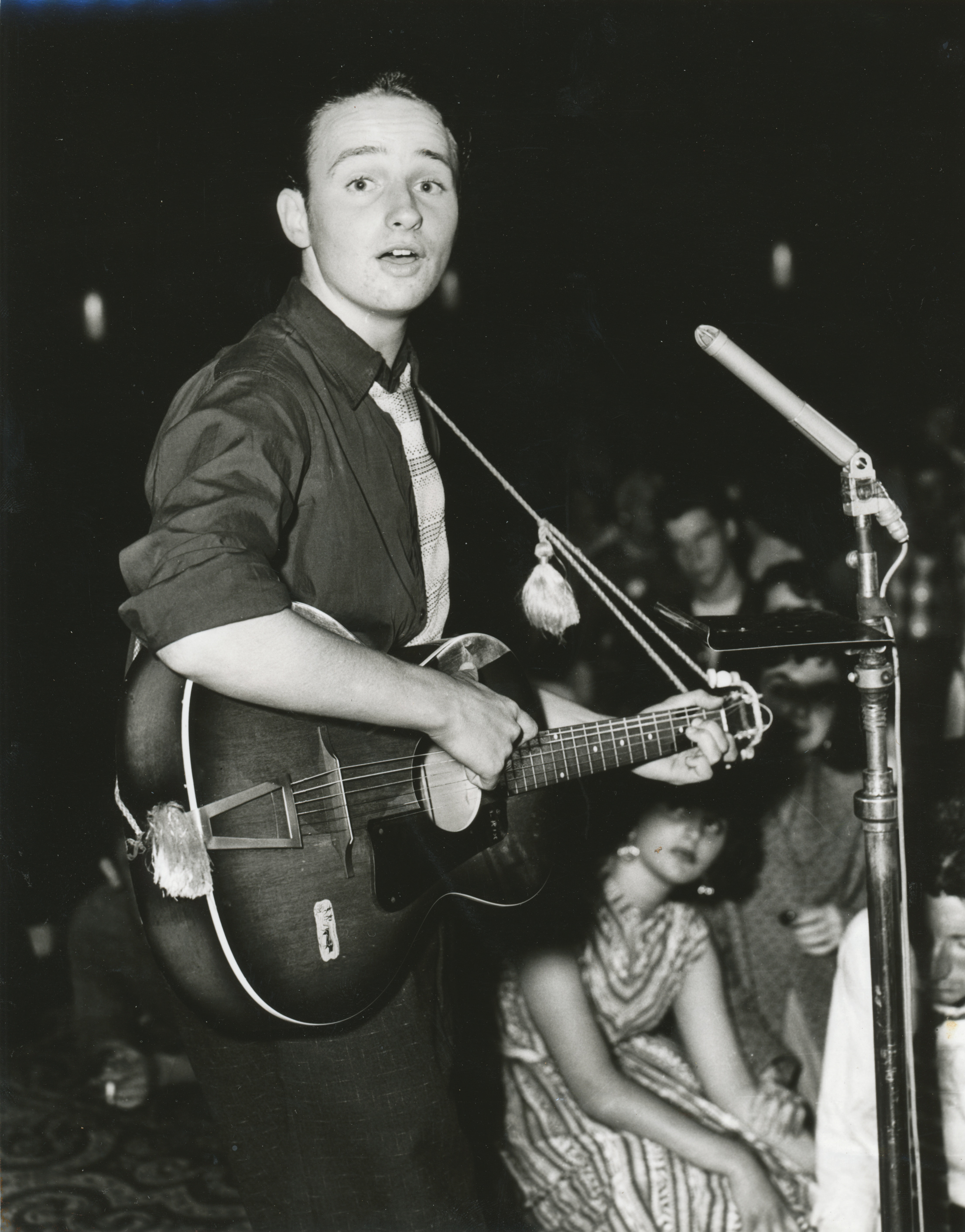
- Lonnie Lee performing in 1957

Background information
- Also known as: Laurie Lee, Lourie Rich David Rix
- Born: David Laurence Rix; 18 September 1940 (age 85); Chatswood, New South Wales, Australia
- Origin: Sydney, New South Wales, Australia
- Genres: Rock 'n' roll
- Occupations: Singer, Musician
- Instrument: Vocals
- Years active: 1957–present
- Labels: Leedon/Festival; EMI/His Master's Voice; Calendar/Festival
- Website: lonnielee.com

Lonnie Lee (born David Lawrence Rix; 18 September 1940) is an Australian singer, who has fronted Lonnie Lee and the Leeman and Lonnie Lee and the Leedons. He is a pioneer of Australian rockabilly music and has worked in the industry for 60 years. At the peak of his career, Lee had eight top 100 singles, which included three top 20s, "Ain't It So" (November 1959), "Starlight Star Bright" (January 1960) and "I Found a New Love" (September 1960). He achieved five gold records. Although Lee released his last single, "Sad Over Someone" in 1969, he continued to tour and perform into the 2000s and released his last album in 2019 titled Back to Base X.

== Biography ==
Lonnie Lee was born as David Laurence Rix, in 1940 and grew up on a sheep farm in Rowena, New South Wales. At the age of seven he started singing in the local church choir, he took up the guitar and did Johnnie Ray impersonations as a teen. He also impersonated Nat King Cole. After leaving secondary school he started work as a bank clerk in Greenacre.

In 1956 he competed in a radio talent quest, 2UW's Alan Toohey's Amateur Hour, where he came second. In February of the following year, as Laurie Lee, he won a contest for "Australia's own Elvis Presley" and was soon under management of fellow rock 'n' roller, Johnny O'Keefe. O'Keefe recommended a name change to Lonnie Lee – in tribute to British skiffle musician Lonnie Donegan – and got his artist signed to Leedon Records, owned by Lee Gordon. The label issued his first single, "Ain't It So", which was written by O'Keefe and became a top 10 hit in Sydney in November 1959.

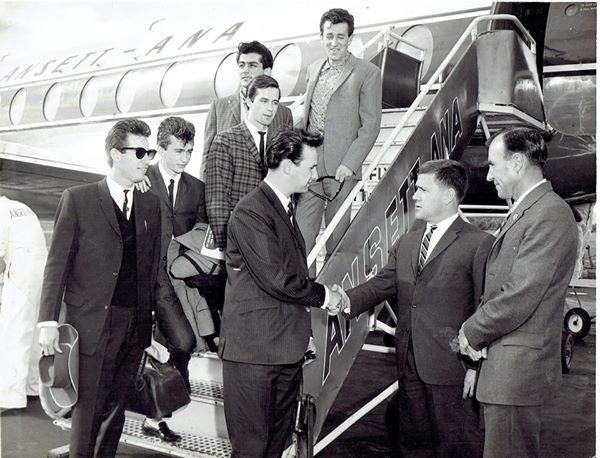
Lee and the original Leemen, arriving in Tasmania in 1960

Lee started Sydney's first rockabilly trio. In July 1959 he made his first TV appearances on the Australian Broadcasting Corporation's rock and roll show, Six O'Clock Rock, as well as Nine Network's Bandstand and later that year appeared in Lee Robinson's feature-length documentary Rock'n'Roll His backing band, the Leemen, initially had Peter Bazley on rhythm guitar, Tony Gaha on drums, Johnny Ryan on bass guitar, Dave Scott on saxophone and Darby Wilson on lead guitar. He later recalled, "It wasn't until 1959 that I did TV. Things really changed. Within a month, I was recording. Within about six weeks I was performing at the stadium with... to 10,000 people and it just went on and on and on. And all of us knew that."

His singles in 1960 were, "Starlight Star Bright" (January), which reached No. 3 in Sydney, "Yes Indeed I Do" (May), "I Found a New Love" (September). The latter reached No. 2 in Sydney. He then followed with "Sit Around and Talk to Me" (March 1961), "When the Bells Stop Ringing" (January 1962), "Don't You Know Pretty Baby" (March) and an extended play, Sitting by the River. His last single was in 1969 with his own track, "Sad Over Someone". By the mid-1960s his backing band were called the New Leemen and comprised Jeff Denton on bass guitar and piano, Graham Dunn on rhythm guitar, Frank Griffith on drums and Lance Ransome on lead guitar. Lee was the first Australian to have a full colour album cover and to record a stereo album.

== Later career ==
During the 1960s, Lee toured the United Kingdom and United States before settling in the US from 1971 recording and writing songs. His song writing included work with Roy Orbison, Cher, Florence Henderson and Glen Campbell. In 1984 Lee returned to Australia where he performed classic rock'n'roll with, Lonnie Lee's Rock'n'Remember Show. He brought many of that era's stars out from their regular jobs and back onto the stage. Lee had a weekly radio show of the same name. In 1984, he enticed a Sydney promoter to bring Fabian to Australia for a series of concerts and performed himself on these. As well as performing with his band, the Leemen, he started a record company, Starlite Records, to release his back catalogue and new material.

In October 2007, he toured with fellow performers Crash Craddock, Bobby Vee and Lesley Gore from the original rock'n'roll era. It was an historic tour as 49 years before, he had toured with Craddock and with the Everly Brothers.

In 2008, he launched another show, Lonnie Lee's Cry!, which featured songs made popular by Johnnie Ray. Tony Bennett cites Ray as the father of rock 'n' roll. The tribute show had Lee and the Leemen, together with a big band, and harks back to the early 1950s when Lee listened and sang along to those songs on the radio. Lee took on the role of a crooner and a singer of pop standards and the show, received positive reviews. As well as that show he performed in others, The Best of Lonnie Lee, Solid Gold, The Hillbilly Cat and The Roots of Aussie Rock. He has written more material and released over 20 CDs. He performed across Australia as a 1950s rockabilly singer. He continued into the 2000s. In 2019 he released his album Back to Base X to celebrate his stage and recording debuts some 60 years ago.

== Honours ==
In 1961, Lee was awarded a commercial radio award, the Golden Microphone Award as Australia's Most Popular Recording Star.
