= Six O'Clock Rock =

Television show of Australia

- Title card
- Genre: Music television
- Created by: David Porter
- Presented by: Ricki Merriman (1959); Johnny O'Keefe (1959-1961); Chet Clark (1962); Tanya Halesworth (1962)
- Country of origin: Australia
- Original language: English
- No. of seasons: 3
- No. of episodes: 138 (list of episodes)

Production
- Producer: Peter Page
- Running time: 45 minutes (from debut); 60 minutes (from 21 November 1959)

Original release
- Network: ABC Television
- Release: 28 February 1959 – 23 December 1961

Six O'Clock Rock was an Australian rock and roll television show broadcast on ABC Television from 28 February 1959 to 23 December 1961 at 6 p.m. on Saturdays.

== Program synopsis ==
Inspired by the BBC program Six-Five Special, Six O'Clock Rock was first broadcast Saturday 28 February 1959 at 6 p.m. as a 45-minute program. It was later extended to one hour from 21 November 1959. The program was created by David Porter and produced by Peter Page.

Broadcast from Sydney on ABN Channel 2, it was recorded and then shown in Melbourne on ABV-2 from 7 March. It was shown on Queensland's ABQ2 beginning in October 1959, and by 1960 in Adelaide on ABS2. In the first six months, the program had already featured 172 solo artists, 16 dance acts, eight guest bands, and eight vocal groups.

The program originally contained a mixture of rock and roll and jazz. The jazz was supplied by the Australian All Stars, featuring Don Burrows on alto and baritone sax, Terry Wilkinson on piano, Ron Webber on drums, Freddy Logan on bass, and tenor player Dave Rutledge. Due to budget constraints, the jazz band were dropped by the end of 1959, though they had their own program Australian All Star Jazz Band.

Alongside the live performances, some pre-recorded filmed clips were shown of American musicians.

At first, Six O'Clock Rock was presented by American Ricki Merriman with Johnny O'Keefe and his band The Dee Jays as guests. However, O'Keefe took over as host after six weeks. From 1961, Chet Clark and Tanya Halesworth took over from O'Keefe. Other host and co-hosts included Sydney DJ's Alan Lappan and Rhett Walker, singers Johnny Rebb, Dig Richards, and Lucky Starr. O'Keefe returned to TV in October 1961 with the Johnny O'Keefe Show on ATN 7. In 1962, Six O'Clock Rock was replaced by The Bryan Davies Show.

== Episodes ==
Only four episodes are known to still exist: 1 August 1959, 7 May 1960, 17 December 1960, 4 March 1961. They are held at the National Film and Sound Archive. The final episode was broadcast in Sydney on 23 December 1961, though it continued to appear in South Australia into 1962 due to their delayed broadcast.

== See also ==
- List of Australian music television shows
