= Kommotion =

Australian "Top 40" pop music TV show of the mid-1960s

- Genre: Pop music
- Based on: Ready Steady Go! by Elkan Allan; Shindig! by Jack Good
- Directed by: David Joseph; Al Maricic
- Presented by: Ken Sparkes
- Opening theme: March of the Mods by Joe Loss and His Orchestra
- Country of origin: Australia
- Original language: English
- No. of seasons: 3

Production
- Producers: David Joseph; Johnny Chester
- Production locations: Nunawading, Victoria, Australia
- Running time: 25 minutes
- Production company: Willard King Organisation

Original release
- Network: ATV-0
- Release: 1964 – 1967

Related
- The Go!! Show; Uptight

Kommotion was a popular Australian "Top 40" pop music TV show that premiered in December 1964. The program was hosted by popular disc jockey Ken Sparkes, who was one of the main presenters at Melbourne pop radio station 3UZ. In 1965, after the end of his previous series, Teen Scene, pop singer Johnny Chester became the associate producer of the program.

It was produced by the Willard King organisation for Melbourne TV station ATV-0 (Channel 0) and was pre-recorded on videotape at the station's Nunawading studio. It was originally seen only in Melbourne, but was later relayed to interstate stations in the newly formed 0-10 Network as they came on line during 1965–66. The Kommotion format was a fast-paced, teenage Top 40 pop music show. It was originally shown in daily half-hour episodes, Monday–Friday at 5.30 pm; an additional one-hour special on Sundays was added later in the run of the series.

In August 1964 Channel 0 premiered its first pop TV program, The Go!! Show (or Go!!). It proved such a ratings success that its original 13-episode contract was extended to 39 episodes after only seven weeks on air, and this encouraged Channel 0 to capitalise on this success by commissioning a second series that would appeal to younger viewers. Both programs showcased the emerging 'beat' pop trend, and provided an energetic alternative to the mainstream family-oriented variety format of the rival Nine Network program, Bandstand. In combination, Go!! and Kommotion gave the nascent 0-10 Network an unbeatable lead in pop TV programming, with The Go!! Show alone regularly pulling in over 400,000 teenage viewers every week.

== Format and presentation ==
Both Kommotion and Go!! featured the current beat-pop style, and both were strongly influenced by United Kingdom-based Ready Steady Go! and the Jack Good-produced American pop TV show, Shindig!. Although many local guest acts appeared on both shows, there were notable stylistic differences between them. The Go!! Show was more closely modelled on Ready, Steady, Go! and was aimed at a slightly older, more sophisticated audience, it featured more local music, and it cost more to produce.

Kommotion was aimed at a younger teen audience and its style was more like Shindig!. Early episodes featured a troupe of go-go dancers (a Shindig! trademark) and had more overseas hits than The Go!! Show, although it did so by using local lip sync artists. Fashion was another vital component of both shows: the Mod fashion trend prevalent in Melbourne, of the time, was visible in both shows. with another major influence being the BBC's perennial, Top Of The Pops.

Jim Keays, a member of The Masters Apprentices, noted in his memoir His Masters Voice (1999), that Kommotion was a key influence on the 1970s and 1980s pop TV series, Countdown. It is no coincidence that some of the regular Kommotion on-air team went on to work on Countdown, including talent coordinator and presenter, Molly Meldrum, and future Countdown executive producer Grant Rule.

Scores of leading Melbourne and interstate pop acts appeared on the show during its two-year run, including Lynne Randell, Dinah Lee, Bobby & Laurie, Normie Rowe, Tony Worsely, Mike Furber, The Easybeats, MPD Ltd, The Elois, The Masters Apprentices, Steve & The Board and The Purple Hearts.

Alongside the appearances by local pop groups, the producers also came up with a simple and cost-effective way of showcasing current international hits. In those days, purpose-made music videos (then called "film clips") were only just beginning to be used to promote new recordings. Australia's great distance from the US and the UK meant that visits by major overseas acts were relatively rare, so the stock-in-trade for Kommotion was to use a troupe of young performers who danced and/or mimed to the latest overseas hits. The producers hired a group of about a dozen Melbourne teenagers, chosen for their looks, fashion sense and dancing ability. The regular cast roster included Molly Meldrum, Tony Healey, David Bland, Alex Rappel, Lex Kaplan, Jillian Fitzgerald, Alex Silbersher, Leon Kammer, Chantal Contouri (later a star of Number 96), Grant Rule (later executive producer of Countdown), Norman Willison, pioneering 'go-go girl' Denise Drysdale, Shirley Reichman, Bob Pritchard and dancer Maggie Stewart (who met pop star Ronnie Burns on the show and later married him). Some performers such as Bob Pritchard went on to release records themselves. Pritchard recorded "Shoppin Around", "Pretty Girl" and "Goodbye Sam, Hello Samantha", which reached number four on the Australian charts. Pritchard also performed in TV dramas such as Homicide, Division 4 and Hunter.

For the mimed segments, the producers matched the performers with a particular style of music. In spite of her fair skin, Jillian Fitzgerald, chosen for her dancing ability, was given the "soul" category, and mimed to R&B classics like Ike and Tina's "River Deep Mountain High". Meldrum specialised in the then-popular, high-camp 1930s style numbers such as Peter & Gordon's "Lady Godiva" and the New Vaudeville Band's "Winchester Cathedral". That practice reportedly led some viewers to believe that Fitzgerald was the actual singer of Aretha Franklin's "Respect", and that Meldrum had recorded "Winchester Cathedral". Another member was RMIT student Keith Millar, who was a neighbour of Meldrum's, who lived with Ronnie Burns' family in Elwood. Millar was best known for Tommy Roe's "Sweet Pea". Several of the cast became virtual pop stars in their own right. Tony Healey was one of the most popular and, along with Bob Pritchard, had their own fan clubs. Alex Silbersher was reportedly chased up three flights of stairs by a horde of girls when a promotion at a Sydney shopping centre got out of control.

The addition of the one-hour Sunday Kommotion special evidently caused some controversy. An unattributed press clipping from the time, reproduced on the Laurie Allan tribute site, indicates that The Go!! Show producers, DYT, were concerned about the increased competition from their rival, which cost less to produce. The article suggested the move might saturate the pop market and lead to a drop in ratings all round, as well as over-exposing the relatively small pool of Australia's top-ranking pop talent. The latter concern was borne out by Jim Keays' comments in his autobiography, in which he reported that The Masters Apprentices were invited on both shows so regularly that they eventually had to ration their appearances for fear of overexposure.

On 12 October 1966, Go-Set magazine reported that the show had been sold to an unspecified American television network and was to be aired to fifty million people, but that never materialised.

== Kommotion label ==
Like The Go!! Show, the success of Kommotion also gave rise to a short-lived pop record label of the same name. The label was set up to promote artists who appeared on the show. It is believed to have been owned by pop entrepreneur Ivan Dayman. Some early releases were produced by Nat Kipner (father of musician Steve Kipner), who went on to briefly manage and produce The Bee Gees before they left Australia, but most of the Kommotion Records releases were produced by Pat Aulton. The label folded in 1967 when Dayman's Sunshine promotions and recording company went broke, around the same time that the TV show was cancelled.

== Series cancellation ==
Although the device of miming to overseas releases proved popular and highly cost-effective, it was in fact this very practice that brought about the demise of Kommotion—the series was cancelled in early 1967 after Australian Actors Equity imposed a ban on miming on all music TV shows, due to concerns that the practice was denying work to Australian musicians.

Like many other Australian pop shows of the period, most of the original tapes of Kommotion were subsequently erased or disposed of. The small amount of material that has survived was copied from the Channel 0 archive in the 1990s and copies have since circulated widely among collectors of Australian popular music.

The floor manager for both Kommotion and The Go!! Show was Ralph Baker, who became well known in Melbourne in the late 1960s as Melbourne's version of "Deadly Earnest", the late night horror movie presenter. There was a local 'Earnest' in several capitals, with Sydney's Ian Bannerman being the original. Baker subsequently became the original floor manager on 0-10's later pop show Uptight.

== See also ==
- List of Australian music television shows
