= Australian record companies in the 1960s =

Independent record labels proliferated in Australia during the 1960s. The local branch of the British-owned EMI company had dominated the Australian record market since the 1920s, but in this period it faced increasing challenges from its rivals, including the Australian arm of the American CBS Records and particularly from the Sydney-based Festival Records, a division of Rupert Murdoch's News Limited.

Festival had its own successful house label, and it also signed valuable distribution deals with some of the most important and successful independent labels of Sixties, notably Leedon Records (which released the earliest recordings by The Bee Gees), Spin Records and the Perth-based Clarion Records. The many hits released on these independent labels comprised a significant part of Festival's total turnover. Other important independent pop labels of this period included the Melbourne-based W&G Records, Astor Records – also a major distributor – and the short-lived Go!! Records label, which was set up in conjunction with the pop music TV series The Go!! Show.

Independent studios and production companies began to play an increasingly important role in the local record industry. Arguably the most productive and influential pop studio in Australia at that time was Armstrong's Studios in Melbourne. Studio owner and engineer Bill Armstrong was an industry veteran who had worked for major record labels, radio stations and advertising clients; and his new studio, which opened in 1965, soon became the most sought after in the country and probably produced more Australian pop hits than any other in this era. It was also one of the first studios in the country to install 8-track and 16-track recorders in the late 1960s and early 1970s, and was an important training ground for some of Australia's best engineers and producers including Roger Savage, John L. Sayers, Ern Rose, John French and many others.

One of the first and most important independent production companies was Albert Productions, which signed both Billy Thorpe & The Aztecs and The Easybeats. It was established in 1969 by young music executive Ted Albert, whose family that owned Australia's leading music publishing house J. Albert & Son and the Macquarie Radio Network, which then included leading Sydney AM pop station 2UW.

Albert Productions scored many major Australian hits (released locally on EMI's Parlophone label) with both their flagship acts in the mid-Sixties, and the Albert Productions record label, established in the early 1970s, became one of the most successful Australian labels of that decade. Other significant 'indie' production houses of the period included Leopold Productions (Max Merritt, The Allusions), set up Festival's original house producer Robert Iredale, and June Productions, led by former W&G/Astor staff producer Ron Tudor, who went on to found Fable Records in 1923.
