= The Librettos =

- The LP Let's Go with The Librettos (HMV), showing the 1965 lineup of the band: (L-R) Lou Parun, Dave Diver, Rod Stone, Brian Peacock

Background information
- Origin: Wellington, New Zealand
- Genres: Pop, R&B
- Years active: 1960-1966
- Labels: His Master's Voice (Australian record label) (NZ/Australia), Sunshine Records (Australia), EMI

The Librettos was a New Zealand pop/R&B group, active from 1960 to 1966. They were one of New Zealand's most popular bands in 1964–65, and after relocating to Sydney they gained recognition in Australia for their polished live performances and their 1966 version of the Paul Revere & The Raiders song "Kicks". Several members of the group went on to other notable bands of the 1960s and 1970s - bassist Brian Peacock co-founded the highly regarded Anglo-Australian "progressive pop" band Procession, Rod Stone joined popular Australian '60s soul group The Groove, and drummer Craig Collinge (the only Australian-born member) later played with Manfred Mann Chapter Three and UK 1970s "proto-punk" band Third World War.

== Career history ==
The Librettos formed in 1960 while its original members were attending Rongotai College in Wellington, and they reportedly chose their name by sticking a pin at random into the page of a dictionary. The original lineup was Roger Simpson (lead vocal), Dave Clark (piano), Rod Stone and Johnny England (guitars), Paul Griffin (bass) and Andy Shackleton (drums), who was later replaced by Gordon Jenkins. They played regularly around Wellington for some time before landing a residency at the city's leading pop venue "Teenarama". They built up a solid following in the city during 1963, and their profile was further boosted by a support slot on the 1964 NZ national tour by British Merseybeat acts Billy J. Kramer & The Dakotas and Cilla Black. They became nationally popular after being spotted by television producer Kevan Moore, who hired them as the resident band on his nationally televised pop show Let's Go.

Gordon Jenkins quit in December 1963, prior to their TV work, and he was replaced by Christchurch drummer Dave Diver. England left soon after, as he did not want to be a full-time musician at the time. He subsequently released a single, "Jezebel"/"Linda Lu", in 1965 as Johnny England & The Titans (on which he was backed by popular Wellington band The Premiers). He was replaced by pianist/singer Lou Parun, who had already established himself as a solo performer and had released four singles on the Lexian Records label in 1962 and 1963.

Paul Griffin also left during 1964 and he was replaced by Brian Peacock (bass, vocals), who had previously played with Christchurch band The Downbeats. When Roger Simpson left he was not replaced, leaving Rod Stone as the only member from the original line-up. Peacock's arrival saw the group change their style to a more R&B-oriented sound, and he soon began co-writing original material with Rod Stone. Later in 1964 the group was signed to the New Zealand branch of His Master's Voice (Australian record label) and they released four singles: "Funny Things" b/w "I'll Send It Your Way", "Young Blood" b/w "That's Alright With Me", "Baby It's Love" (a Peacock-Stone original) b/w "Great Balls of Fire", and "It's Alright" b/w "Walkin' The Dog".

In 1964, they also recorded and released their only LP, Let's Go With The Librettos, which combined popular covers from their set with six Peacock-Stone originals. It includes their cover of the Ventures number "Let's Go", which was the theme for the TV show, and was probably their best-known song in New Zealand, although it was never released as a single. In 1965, they were offered another season with the Let's Go show but turned it down in favour of going to Australia, like many other New Zealand acts of the time.

The band relocated to Sydney in March 1965, but found it hard going - arriving at the peak of the "Beat Boom" in Australia, they found themselves competing with literally hundreds of other similar groups. Three days into a residency at the Sylvania Hotel in Sydney's south, the band was sacked for playing too many Beatles covers and "mod music", and they were forced to take part-time jobs to make ends meet. Despite these setbacks, they were able to record two more singles - HMV released an Australian-only single, "Great Balls Of Fire" / "Twilight Time", while in New Zealand they released "Ella Speed" / "I Want Your Love", which was recorded in Sydney in September.

Dave Diver quit in September 1965 and returned to New Zealand, where he joined The Countdowns. He was replaced by Australian drummer Craig Collinge. By November 1965, the Librettos were starting to gain wider popularity. They made several appearances on TV pop shows including Sing Sing Sing (hosted by Johnny O'Keefe), Saturday Date, Ten on the Town and TV Tonight, took over a residency at Suzie Wong's, recently vacated by the Missing Links and then began getting regular work at the popular Sydney CBD venue The Bowl, run by Brisbane-based pop impresario Ivan Dayman.

Later in the year The Librettos featured in a package tour of artists from Dayman's Sunshine booking company and record label, backing fellow New Zealander Jim McNaught, and Australian singers Marcie Jones, Peter Doyle (later a member of Virgil Brothers and The New Seekers) and Graeme Chapman, and they headlined an extended tour of rural New South Wales and Victoria. They returned to New Zealand over the Christmas period, to undertake a small tour, which played to packed houses, and they were acknowledged as being New Zealand's best group in 1965.

Returning to Australia in early 1966 they were offered the chance to record on Dayman's Sunshine label with the label's house producer Pat Aulton. The first single released was "I Cry" / "She's A Go-Go", followed by a cover of the Fontella Bass hit "Rescue Me" b/w "What Do You Want To Make Those Eyes At Me For", but both singles flopped. Following these chart failures, Lou Parun quit in April 1966 - he returned to New Zealand, and retired from the music industry. Peacock took over as lead vocalist, and the remaining members considered replacements, but eventually decided to stay as a three-piece, and relocated to Melbourne. There they recorded their final single, "Kicks" / "Whatcha Gonna Do About It", which received good airplay in Melbourne (notably from leading DJ Stan "The Man" Rofe") but did not sell well.

In late 1966, Australian solo star Normie Rowe (who was the Sunshine label's most successful act) was preparing to relocate to London in an attempt to break into the British pop scene, but before departure two members of his backing band, the Playboys, opted to stay in Australia for family reasons, so Rowe approached Brian Peacock and Rod Stone to replace them. In August 1966, the Librettos made one last recording at Festival Studios in Sydney, "It's Loving Time" (which remained unreleased until 1997). The Librettos played their last gig at Melbourne disco Pinocchio's that month, and the revamped lineup of the Playboys with Peacock and Stone left for the UK in November. Following the split, Craig Collinge formed a trio, The Knack, which played consistently around Sydney during 1967 but did not record.

== After the Librettos ==
Normie Rowe's English sojourn was ultimately unsuccessful, and although it yielded several singles that were major hits back in Australia (on which he was backed by professional British session players), the cost of underwriting the venture reportedly precipitated the financial collapse of Dayman's Sunshine group. While Rowe was overseas, the lineup of the Playboys changed again - keyboardist Phil Blackmore had to return to Australia for family reasons, and Rod Stone quit soon after, reportedly after a disagreement with the other band members. He returned to Australia, where he subsequently joined up with another New Zealander, Peter Williams (ex-Max Merritt and the Meteors) to form The Groove, who scored several hit singles in Australia, and later returned to the UK after The Groove won the 1967 national final of the Hoadley's Battle of the Sounds.

Trottman and Stone were replaced by two English musicians, organist Trevor Griffin and guitarist Mick Rogers and the Playboys continued as Rowe's backing group for live performances until he returned to Australia in mid-1967. Before leaving England the Playboys scored a one-off single deal with the recently formed Immediate Records, for whom they cut two original numbers, "Sad" / "Black Sheep R.I.P." Although the single was not successful at the time, it gained a cult following among collectors and was later included in several major anthologies of 1960s pop, including Lenny Kaye's Nuggets series.

The Playboys returned to Australia with Rowe in July 1967. Later in the year they went back on the road with him, but a planned eleven-week national tour was dramatically cut short on 20 September, just as they arrived in Perth, when Rowe received his call-up notice for compulsory national service in the Australian Army. With Rowe due to start his army stint in January 1967, the Playboys had already decided to go out on their own; they had initially opted to wait until they completed Rowe's scheduled Australian/New Zealand farewell tour, but after a fight with Rowe at Pinocchio's in Melbourne on 25 October, they quit the tour. Graham Trottman opted to leave at this point, so Peacock contacted his former Librettos bandmate Craig Collinge, who broke up The Knack and moved to Melbourne to join the quartet, which was renamed Procession.

In 1997, EMI released a Librettos CD anthology, which compiled almost all of their studio recordings, including all the tracks from their 1965 Let's Go With The Librettos album, and all of their HMV and Sunshine tracks, except their final Sunshine 45 ("Rescue Me" / "What Do You Want To Make Those Eyes At Me For").

== Personnel ==
- Roger Simpson (lead vocal), 1960–64
- Dave Clark (piano), early 1960s
- Rod Stone (guitar, vocals) 1960–66
- Johnny England (guitar) 1960–63
- Paul Griffin (bass) 1960–64
- Andy Shackleton (drums) 1960-61?
- Gordon Jenkins (drums) 1961–1963
- Lou Parun (guitar, vocals) 1963–66
- Dave Diver (drums) 1963–65
- Brian Peacock (bass, vocals) 1964–66
- Craig Collinge (drums, vocals) 1965-66
