= Dave Miller (New Zealand musician) =

New Zealand-born musician

- Born: 1941 or 1942 (age 82–83)
- Origin: Christchurch, New Zealand
- Genres: Pop; rock; heavy rock
- Occupations: Musician; music journalist
- Instrument: Vocals
- Years active: 1963–1980
- Labels: Zodiac; Spin/Festival

Dave Miller (born 1941/1942, Christchurch, New Zealand) is a New Zealand former rock music singer-songwriter and journalist. He was the founding mainstay of Dave Miller Set (1967-1970, 1973), which were based in Australia. Long-term fellow members included Leith Corbett on bass guitar, Mike McCormack on drums and John Robinson on lead guitar. Their cover version of "Mr Guy Fawkes" (July 1969) peaked in the top 30 on the Go-Set national singles chart. The group disbanded early in 1970 and Corbett, McCormack and Robinson founded the fellow rock group, Blackfeather. Miller and Corbett combined for a studio album, Reflections of a Pioneer (September 1970) by Dave Miller/Leith Corbett and Friends (McCormack on drums for some tracks). In February 1973 Miller and Robinson briefly revived Dave Miller Set. Before the end of that year Miller travelled to the United Kingdom and worked as a music journalist. He returned to Australia in 1980 and lived in New South Wales. In September 2017 Miller curated a compilation album, Mr Guy Fawkes: Complete Spin Recordings & More 1967-1970, which included tracks by Dave Miller Set and by Dave Miller/Leith Corbett and Friends on CD.

== Biography ==
Dave Miller was born in 1941/1942 in Christchurch, New Zealand. His younger brother, Graeme Miller, started working as a drummer with various local groups from 1962. One such group was the Playboys which included Phil Garland on lead vocals, Diane Jacobs on lead vocals (later known as Dinah Lee) and Brian Ringrose on lead guitar (both ex-Saints). The Playboys often rehearsed in the Miller's home with Miller listening in and singing along. After Garland and Jacobs had left in early 1963 Dave Miller joined the Playboys on lead vocals alongside Graeme, Ringrose, John O'Neill on bass guitar and his younger brother Kevin O'Neill on guitar. The group gained a residency at The Laredo in Christchurch from late 1963 to late 1964.

In November 1964 the Playboys relocated to Auckland, in the following month they changed their name to the Byrds and later to Dave Miller and the Byrds. The founding line-up of the Byrds was Miller on lead vocals, Graeme on drums, Ringrose on lead guitar, Chris Collier on bass guitar and Al Dunster on rhythm guitar. Dave Miller and the Byrds released three singles, "Bright Lights, Big City", "How You've Changed" and "No Time" (all in 1965) and an extended play, Dave Miller & the Byrds (1966) on Zodiac Records. The group broke up in 1966, Collier went to Hamilton, Dunster left for Australia, Ringrose returned to Christchurch, and Miller relocated to Sydney.

From April 1966 Miller worked as a compere, DJ and sometime solo vocalist at various Sydney music venues, including The Bowl, which were owned by talent manager and label owner, Ivan Dayman. Late in that year Dayman revamped the venue as the Op-Pop Disco and Miller was asked to find a house band. He formed the Dave Miller Set in 1967 with Harry Brus on bass guitar (ex-Amazons), Ray Mulholland on drums (ex-Rayders) and John Robinson on lead guitar (ex-Lonely Ones, Monday's Children). They were signed to Spin Records and released three pop music singles, "Why? Why? Why?" (November 1967), "Hope" (May 1968) and "Let's Get Together" (September). At the end of 1967 Miller organised for the group to undertake a gig on a cruise ship for ten days visiting Fiji, Nouméa and New Zealand.

During 1968 Brus was replaced on bass guitar by Bob Thompson who was replaced in turn by Leith Corbett (ex-Heart 'n' Soul), while in the following year Mulholland was replaced on drums by Mike McCormac (ex-Sect). Their repertoire moved to heavy rock and they released their fourth single, "Mr Guy Fawkes" (July 1969), with Pat Aulton producing. It is a cover version of an Eire Apparent album track. Dave Miller Set's rendition peaked at No. 28 on the Go-Set National Top 40. Australian musicologist, Ian McFarlane, observed, "[it] ranks alongside the Russell Morris psychedelic classic 'The Real Thing' as the high-water mark of Australian pop production in the late 1960s."

Miller disbanded that group in March 1970 and released a solo single, "Does Anybody Really Know What Time It Is?": a cover version of Chicago's single. Corbett, McCormac and Robinson formed another rock band, Blackfeather, with Neale Johns on vocals. Later that year Miller and Corbett worked on an album, Reflections of a Pioneer, with McCormac supplying drums on some tracks. It was released in September 1970 under the name Dave Miller/Leith Corbett and Friends via Spin Records. McFarlane felt its, "diverse sound" was shown in the single (and title track), "Reflections of a Pioneer" (November), a "country-tinged psychedelic pop" tune along with its B-side, "353527 Charles", a "heavy rock" track. In February 1973 Dave Miller Set briefly reformed with Miller and Robinson joined by Steve Hogg on bass guitar (ex-Bakery) and Steve Webb on drums (ex-Blackfeather, Duck). Late that year Miller relocated to London, where he worked as a music journalist but was still writing and playing music. He returned to Australia in 1980 and lived in New South Wales but did not resume his professional music career.

In September 2017 Miller curated a compilation album, Mr Guy Fawkes: Complete Spin Recordings & More 1967-1970, which included Dave Miller Set tracks and Dave Miller/Leith Corbett and Friends tracks on CD via Frenzy/RPM. Ian Canty of Louder Than War described how, "[he] played around with Beat, Psych and Harder Rock modes but always added something else to them and he continued to expand his musical vista on his solo album... [thus it] still sounds fresh and surprisingly contemporary."

== Members ==
The Playboys

- Phil Garland – lead vocals (1962–1963)
- Mark Graham – rhythm guitar (1962–1963)
- Dinah Lee (a.k.a. Diane Jacobs) (1962–1963)
- Dave Martin – guitar (1962)
- Graeme Miller – drums (1962–1964)
- John O'Neill – bass guitar (1962–1964)
- Brian Ringrose – lead guitar (1962–1964)
- Dave Miller – lead vocals (1963–1964)
- Kevin O'Neill – guitar (1963–1964)

The Byrds/Dave Miller and the Byrds

- Mark Graham – rhythm guitar (1964)
- Dave Miller – lead vocals (1964–1966)
- Graeme Miller – drums (1964–1966)
- Brian Ringrose – lead guitar (1964–1965)
- John O'Neill – bass guitar (1964–1965)
- Kevin O'Neill – rhythm guitar (1964–1965)
- Al Dunster – rhythm guitar (1965–1966)
- Chris Collier – bass guitar (1965–1966)

Dave Miller Set

- Dave Miller – lead vocals (1967–1970, 1973)
- Harry Brus – bass guitar (1967–1968)
- Mick Gibbons – guitar (1967)
- Greg Hook – keyboards (1967)
- Ray Mulholland – drums (1967–1968)
- John Robinson – lead guitar (1967–1970, 1973)
- Bob Thompson – bass guitar (1968)
- Leith Corbett – bass guitar (1968–1970)
- Mike McCormack – drums (1969–1970)
- Steve Hogg – bass guitar (1973)
- Steve Webb – drums (1973)

== Discography ==
=== Albums ===
Dave Miller/Leith Corbett and Friends

- Reflections of a Pioneer (September 1970) – Spin Records/Festival Records (SEL 934008)
  - Reflections of a Pioneer (re-release on CD, 1998) – Vicious Sloth Collectables

Dave Miller Set

- Mr Guy Fawkes: Complete Spin Recordings & More 1967-1970 (compilation, 22 September 2017) – Frenzy/RPM (Retro 994)

=== Extended plays ===
Dave Miller and the Byrds

- Dave Miller & the Byrds (1966) – Zodiac Records (EPZ 131)

Dave Miller Set

- Dave Miller Set (1968) – Spin Records/Festival Records (EX 11530)
- Mr Guy Fawkes (1969) – Spin Records/Festival Records (EX 11608)

=== Singles ===
The Byrds/Dave Miller and the Byrds

- "Bright Lights, Big City" (1965) – Zodiac Records (Z45 1204)
- "How You've Changed" (1965) – Zodiac Records (Z45 1220)
- "No Time" (1965) – Zodiac Records (Z45 1225)

Dave Miller Set

- "Why? Why? Why?" (1967) – Spin Records/Festival Records (EK 2064)
- "Hope" (1968) – Spin Records/Festival Records (EK 2277)
- "Let's Get Together" (1968) – Spin Records/Festival Records (EK 2550)
- "Mr Guy Fawkes" (1969) – Spin Records/Festival Records (EK 3160)

Dave Miller

- "Does Anybody Really Know What Time It Is?" (1969) – Spin Records/Festival Records (EK 3571)

Dave Miller / Leith Corbett and Friends

- "Reflections of a Pioneer" (1970) – Spin Records/Festival Records (EK 4002)
