= Dayman =

Dayman may refer to:

== People ==
- Dayman (surname)

== Places ==
- Daymán River, Uruguay
- Dayman Island, a privately owned island off the coast of British Columbia, Canada
- Dayman Island, Queensland, one of the Torres Strait Islands located between Australia and New Guinea
- Cape Dayman, Victoria Land, Antarctica

== Other ==
- Dayman, a fictional heroic character referenced in the television show It's Always Sunny in Philadelphia and the musical The Nightman Cometh

== See also ==
- Dayman Big-eyed Tree Frog, Nyctimystes daymani
- Daysman (disambiguation)
