= Mike Furber =

Australian entertainer (1948–1973)

- On The Go!! Show, July 1966

Background information
- Born: Michael Alexander Furber; 26 September 1948; London, England
- Origin: Brisbane, Australia
- Died: 10 May 1973 (aged 24) Sydney, Australia
- Genre: Pop
- Occupations: Singer, theatre performer
- Instrument: Vocals
- Years active: 1965–1973
- Labels: Sunshine, Kommotion, Columbia, Festival, Radioactive
- Formerly of: The Bowery Boys

Michael Alexander Furber (26 September 1948 – 10 May 1973) was an English-born Australian entertainer popular in the mid-1960s as the lead singer of Mike Furber and the Bowery Boys. Furber's group had hits with "Just a Poor Boy", "You Stole My Love" and "That's When Happiness Began" (all in 1966). In the Go Set Pop Poll, Furber was voted in the top 5 as most popular Male Vocalist in both 1966 and 1967. Furber's subsequent solo singing career was less successful and in the early 1970s he turned to stage musicals: including Godspell and Nuclear. According to police investigators Furber committed suicide on 10 May 1973, by hanging, in the garage of his home. Rock music historian Ian McFarlane writes, "Reputedly in the depths of depression, he hanged himself... It has been suggested, however, that Furber was actually murdered because he had befriended a Kings Cross prostitute."

== Biography ==
Michael Alexander Furber was born on 26 September 1948 in the London suburb of Battersea, England. His father was Edward George Furber (born c. 1924) and his mother was Mary Furber (née Young c. 1926–1989); he was raised with a sister Marian. When he was about 10, the family emigrated to Brisbane, Australia.

Furber as lead vocalist joined local pop band the Bowery Boys, which consisted of Robbie van Delft on lead guitar and vocals, Neville Peard on drums, Paul Wade on bass guitar and vocals, and Greg Walker on rhythm guitar. Furber had met Peard and Wade on a suburban train, the pair had already formed the Bowery Boys earlier that year. Initially they performed in Brisbane and Surfers Paradise before relocating to Sydney in May 1965. The group signed with Sunshine Records and were managed by label boss, Ivan Dayman, who also managed Normie Rowe. Dayman promoted the group as Mike Furber and the Bowery Boys; according to writer, Dean Mittelhauser, Dayman had planned to have Furber as a solo artist from the start.

In late 1965 their debut single, "Just a Poor Boy", was released and in early 1966 it became a top 5 hit in Adelaide and top 30 in both Melbourne and Sydney. There were no national charts in Australia at that time, although David Kent back-calculated chart positions in 2005 and listed "Just a Poor Boy" in the top 50 in his Australian Chart Book 1940–1969's Kent Music Report. The track was written by van Delft, Peard and Wade. In February 1966 their second single, "You Stole My Love", was released – it is a cover version of the Mockingbirds 1965 single, written by the group's Graham Gouldman (later formed 10cc). Furber's version was a top 10 hit in Melbourne and peaked at No. 12 in Adelaide. At No. 36 nationally, it is his highest charting single on the Kent Music Report.

The Kommotion label released the group's debut album, Just a Poor Boy. In that year Furber, as a popular artist, was interviewed on conscription in teen-oriented pop music newspaper Go-Set's article on Australia's involvement in the Vietnam War. He stated, "you can't find an excuse for forcing a man to give up his chosen career to go into the army and fight a war in what would be one of the most dubious conflicts of all times." In July 1966 a third single, "That's When Happiness Began", was issued but the group disbanded in August.

Dayman now focussed on Furber as a solo artist and organised more appearances on local TV: The Go!! Show and Kommotion. Furber released three solo singles in 1967, "Where Were You?" (January), "I'm so Glad" (August) and "Bring Your Love Back Home" (October) but none charted. A Go-Set reviewer praised "Bring Your Love Back Home" as "the best disc he has ever had. It could be the break he has been waiting for to put him right back on top." In Go-Set's Pop Poll, Furber was voted in the top 5 as most popular Male Vocalist in both 1966 and 1967. During a performance in July 1967 in Queanbeyan he was dragged from the stage, "stunned and groggy, [he] climbed back with the aid of police and continued his act."

Furber's label, Sunshine, collapsed late in 1967 and the artist had a nervous breakdown. He was conscripted for National Service during the Vietnam War. In 1969 he signed with Columbia Records and released "There's No Love Left" in June. That was followed in November by "I'm on Fire" / "Watch Me Burn", with both sides written by Vanda & Young (ex-The Easybeats) as a two-part pop suite. According to Iain McIntyre in his book, Tomorrow Is Today (2006), "'I'm on Fire' is scintillating pop track underscored by a ripping lead fuzz guitar line and a solid rhythm section" however "'Watch Me Burn' is even wilder, with twin lead guitars (one fuzz and one wah-wah) wailing away beneath Furber's excellent vocal performance". Nevertheless, neither of the singles charted and Furber was dropped by Columbia.

In June 1970 Furber toured Australia with the Sect, and Doug Parkinson in Focus as support acts to United States group the Four Tops. Furber performed in stage musicals: Godspell (April 1972) and Nuclear (March 1973). He was fired from Nuclear soon after it started. Furber supposedly committed suicide by hanging in May 1973 (see below).

In 1974 Festival Records, which had bought out the Sunshine label's catalogue, issued a compilation album by Various Artists, So You Want to Be a Rock 'n' Roll Star? The "Scream Years" of Australian Rock 1964–1966, which was curated and annotated by Glenn A. Baker. Brandon Stewart of Hamersley News reviewed the album in 1976 and compared Furber's track, "You Stole My Love", to his rival Normie Rowe's rendition of "Tell Him I'm not Home" (1965), "I always felt that in some ways [Furber] was a better vocalist than [Rowe] and I'm glad to see that his contribution to Australian music is justified by his presence on the album. [Baker's] notes follow his tragic career, constantly in [Rowe]'s shadow until his untimely death by suicide."

In 1999 Festival Records issued another compilation album, Diddy Wah Diddy, of his work with the Bowery Boys and solo. In 2005 Radioactive Records re-issued Just a Poor Boy, Allmusic's Richie Unterberger found "Furber was an okay but uneven singer, and in fact sounds rather horribly off-pitch on 'Stop!' He also seemed to favor fairly tough R&B material that was actually a little too tough for his ordinary range" but he preferred "You're Back Again" and "Love Talk" as "the standouts, both because they're not overly familiar songs and because they're more suited toward Furber's voice."

=== Health and death ===
Furber had his first of a series of nervous breakdowns in late 1967. In that era Australian men were required to register for a sortition (a type of lottery) based on their 20th birthday, subsequently individuals were conscripted for National Service, during the Vietnam War. Generally the service lasted for two years, unless an exemption or reduction was granted. Furber disappeared from public performances for about 18 months until 1969. His friends acknowledged that Furber was "traumatised" by his national service experience.

According to music historian Ian McFarlane, he was "[n]ever a strong-willed person to begin with, Furber continued to suffer bouts of depression." On 10 May 1973 Furber's body was found hanged in the garage of his Sydney home. A police investigation determined that the singer had committed suicide. McFarlane continued, "[r]eputedly in the depths of depression, he hanged himself... It has been suggested, however, that Furber was actually murdered because he had befriended a King's Cross prostitute." In his autobiography, For Facts Sake (2013), bass guitarist Bob Daisley alleges that other sources confirmed that Furber was murdered. Furber was cremated and in 1989 his ashes, together with his recently deceased mother's, were spread beneath a cherry blossom tree near Barramunga in the Otway Ranges. His father, Ed, was 83, at the time of Furber's 60th birthday.

== Discography ==
Credits:

=== Albums ===
- Just a Poor Boy (1967) – Kommotion Records (KL-32030)
- Diddy Wah Diddy (compilation, 1999) – Spin Records/Festival Records (D-26296)

=== Extended plays ===
- Just a Poor Boy (May 1966) – Sunshine Records/Kommotion Records (QX 11143)
- You Stole My Love (October 1966) – Kommotion Records (KX 11204)
- Where Are You? (1967) – Kommotion Records (KX 11253)
- It's Too Late (1967) – Sunshine Records (QX 11347)

=== Singles ===
Year	Title	Peak chart positions	Album
Year	Title	AUS	Album
1965	"Just a Poor Boy" (Mike Furber & the Bowery Boys)	42	Just a Poor Boy EP
1966	"You Stole My Love" (Mike Furber & the Bowery Boys)	36	You Stole My Love EP
1966	"You" / "That's When Happiness Began" (Mike Furber & the Bowery Boys)	85	You Stole My Love EP
1967	"Where Are You"	93	Where Are You? EP
1967	"I'm So Glad"	—	It's Too Late EP
1967	"If You Need Me"	—	It's Too Late EP
1969	"There's no Love Left"	—	non-album single
1969	"I'm on Fire" / "Watch Me Burn"	—	non-album single
"—" denotes a recording that did not chart or was not released in that territory.

== Awards and nominations ==
=== Go-Set Pop Poll ===
Go-Set was a teen-oriented weekly pop music newspaper established in February 1966, which co-ordinated the Go-Set Pop Poll from 1966 to 1972. Its readers filled out coupons to determine the most popular personalities. Go-Set provided cover page articles: "Mike Furber & the Bowery Boys" (23 March 1966, pp. 1, 8), "Mike – Normie – Questions on their likes and dislikes" (21 September 1966, pp. 1, 34) and "Furber Collapses – Mike Furber found unconscious by Lily Brett" (23 November 1966, pp. 1, 34).

Year	Nominee / work	Award	Result
1966	himself	Australian Acts: Male Vocal	4th
1967	himself	Australian Acts: Male Singer	5th
