= Dayman (surname) =

Dayman is a surname. Notable people with the surname include:

- Clem Dayman (1892–1967), Australian rules footballer
- Edward Dayman (1807–1890), English clergyman and hymn writer
- Greg Dayman (born 1947), New Zealand field hockey player
- Ivan Dayman (1920–1989), Australian record producer and band manager
- Les Dayman (1901–1977), Australian rules footballer
- Leslie Dayman (1933–2023), Australian actor
- Marlene Dayman (born 1949), Australian swimmer
