= Sunshine Records (Australia) =

Sunshine Records was an Australian independent pop music record label of the mid-1960s. It was established in late 1964 by promoter Ivan Dayman in collaboration with musician-producer-arranger-songwriter Pat Aulton and entrepreneur, producer and songwriter Nat Kipner (who subsequently founded the Spin Records label). Although his enterprise was short-lived, Dayman was arguably the first Australian popular music entrepreneur to create a fully integrated pop music company that included artist management and bookings, record production, record labels, venue management and concert promotion.

Most of the label's releases were made in the period 1965–67. Its biggest act was solo singer Normie Rowe, Australia's top male pop star from 1965 to 1968, who scored a string of Australian hit singles including "It Ain't Necessarily So", "I (Who Have Nothing)", "Que Sera Sera" and "Shakin' All Over".

== History ==
=== Founding ===
Label founder Ivan Dayman reportedly ran a gravel quarry in his hometown of Adelaide, South Australia before moving into pop management and promotion in the early 1960s. He was very successful for a few years and at its height in 1965-66 his Sunshine group included two record labels, a concert promotion and booking agency, artist management and a string of venues in capital cities and major towns from Adelaide to north Queensland, including the Cloudland Ballroom in Brisbane.

In late 1964 Dayman expanded his business by establishing the Sunshine label, to record and produce the pop artists he already had under contract and to launch new discoveries. The label's parent company, Sunshine Productions, was a partnership between Dayman, expatriate American entrepreneur Nat Kipner and musician Pat Aulton. Kipner had teamed up with Dayman when the latter expanded his pop promotions into Brisbane, where Nat was producing TV pop shows for Channel 7, among many other ventures; he also ran a record store, wrote comedy skits and songs for the George Wallace Jr TV variety show Theatre Royal, ran a small publishing company with Johnny Devlin, and wrote songs with Devlin, country musician Geoff Mack (author of "I've Been Everywhere") and Nat's teenage son Steve Kipner. Pat Aulton had met Dayman in Adelaide in the early Sixties while fronting The Clefs; Dayman hired him to work as an MC and opening act for his concerts, and Aulton eventually became Sunshine's musical director and house producer.

Sunshine established a manufacturing and distribution deal with by Festival Records, similar to those that Festival made with other contemporary independent labels including Clarion Records, Spin Records and Albert Productions. Sunshine was (in local terms) a relatively productive label, with over 100 singles, more than 30 EPs and at least dozen LPs released between 1964 and 1971.

This is a similar volume of releases to its successor, Spin Records, and both labels existed for a similar time-span, but while Sunshine and Spin released almost identical numbers of singles and EPs, Spin issued many more LPs. This difference can be explained by the rapid growth in sale of LPs in the late 1960s and early 1970s. During Sunshine's peak period from 1964 to 1967, singles and EPs were by far the biggest selling vinyl formats in Australia while LPs—still something of a luxury at that time—formed only a small percentage of total record sales.

In early 1964 Dayman took over the Saturday night lease on Melbourne Festival Hall and renamed it "Mersey City". On 2 May 1964 the venue opened with Tony Worsley & The Fabulous Blue Jays, attended by over 4500 teenagers. Dayman also used Worsley and the Blue Jays to open several other Queensland venues in Bundaberg, Toowoomba, Ipswich, Inala, Surfers Paradise and the city and by the end of the year, with the success of their first single, they were one of the hottest pop acts in the country.

=== Releases ===
The first Sunshine single release, in October 1964, was the single "Jay Walker" by The Blue Jays, who were already well established in their home town of Melbourne and had released instrumental singles on the small Crest label. In early 1964 Dayman teamed the band with a young Brisbane singer, Tony Worsley. The Blue Jays continued to release records under their own name, but it was the teaming of The Blue Jays with Worsley that launched Sunshine on the national pop scene. In November 1964 Sunshine issued the first single jointly credited to Tony Worsley and The Fabulous Blue Jays, "Sure Know A Lot About Love", which charted in Brisbane, and the band broke through in other capitals with a their powerful version of Rosco Gordon's "Just A Little Bit" in early 1965.

Another notable early release was the Pat Aulton-produced single "Lost My Baby"/"Slowly But Surely" by The Pacifics, a Brisbane-based four-piece instrumental group that had previously recorded two instrumental singles for EMI's Parlophone label, produced by Nat Kipner. The B-side of their second single was written by Nat's young son Steve Kipner, who went on to front Sydney-based beat band Steve & The Board and subsequently formed the British-based pop duo Tin Tin with fellow Australian Steve Groves.

Sunshine's greatest success was solo singer Normie Rowe, who scored a string of major Australian hits between 1965 and 1968, and his double-A-sided 1965 single "Que Sera Sera" / "Shakin' All Over" became one of the biggest-selling local hits of the 1960s and is still one of the biggest selling Australian singles of all time.

The Sunshine roster featured several male solo singers including Normie Rowe, Peter Doyle (who later joined The Virgil Brothers and The New Seekers) and Mike Furber. Its more 'left field' signings included hardcore Brisbane blues-R&B band The Purple Hearts, highly rated NZ pop/R&B group The Librettos, Tony Worsley & The Fabulous Blue Jays, Normie Rowe's backing band The Playboys, Marcie Jones & The Cookies, highly rated Sydney teen singer Toni McCann, renowned surf band The Atlantics, Ricky & Tammy, Melbourne's feedback kings Running Jumping Standing Still, NZ folk duo Bill & Boyd, Rev. Black & The Rockin' Vicars, popular Brisbane solo star Jonne Sands and Brisbane pop band Wickedy Wak, whose Sunshine single "Billie's Bikie Boys"—the recording debut of future star Rick Springfield—was produced by Molly Meldrum.

Many earlier Sunshine recordings, including most of Rowe's early singles and albums, were produced by Nat Kipner, but in late 1965 Kipner sold his share in Sunshine and the Sydney Bowl nightclub. During mid-1966 Kipner collaborated with independent producer Ossie Byrne on the short-lived Downunder Records. During this period he briefly took over the management of The Bee Gees and persuaded Festival's Leedon label to release the band from their contract and signed them to the newly established Spin Records, which he had just joined as A&R manager. Following Kipner's departure, Pat Aulton took over as Sunshine's main producer, but both he and Kipner also produced recordings on Sunshine's short-lived sister label Kommotion, which was set up to promote the acts who appeared on the TV pop show of the same name. Aulton produced and engineered many later Sunshine singles and albums, as well as providing uncredited vocal and instrumental backing and contributing to arrangements.

=== Closure ===
Sunshine Productions ran into serious financial problems around the end of 1966, but the full story behind the company's collapse is still not known. Pop historian Bill Casey has suggested that the financial strain of Normie Rowe's extended overseas stay was a contributing factor, but it seems likely that the main cause of the company's demise was Dayman's questionable business practices. The Kommotion label folded at the start of 1967, and Sunshine was taken over by Festival and become a wholly owned subsidiary label.

After the collapse of Sunshine, Pat Aulton discovered that Dayman had made him a director of the company without his knowledge, and when Sunshine's creditors moved in to recover their debts, Aulton's unwitting liability cost him his car, furniture and other assets. Fortunately, he was by then well known to Festival managing director Fred Marks, who rescued Aulton with the offer of a position as a staff producer at Festival. It is not known whether Dayman retained any interest or played any role in the company after 1967, although he continued to operate his promotions and management business in several cities.

Sunshine's recording assets were acquired by its distributor, Festival Records during 1967. The label's releases declined rapidly from this point and it ceased operations after two final singles released during 1971.

The Sunshine catalogue remained in the archive of Festival Records until that company went into liquidation in 2005, when the combined Festival-Mushroom Records recording archive was sold to the Australian division of the Warner Music Group for a reported A$10 million.

== Discography ==
=== Singles ===
Credits:

Catalog no.	Date	Artist	Title	Notes
QK-747	Oct. 1964	The Blue Jays	"Jay Walker" / "Path Finder"	
QK-778	Nov. 1964	Tony Worsley & The Fabulous Blue Jays	"I Sure Know A Lot About Love" / "Me You Gotta Teach"	
QK-798	Jan. 1965	The Blue Jays	"Motivate" / "We're Friends"	
QK-799	1965	The Pacifics	"Lost My Baby" / "Slowly But Surely"	
QK-833	1965	The Playboys	"Exodus" / "Sabre Dance"	
QK-903	Mar. 1965	Tony Worsley & The Blue Jays	"Just a Little Bit" / "If I"	
QK-918	1965	The Playboys	"Swan Lake" / "Camptown Races"	
QK-902	Mar. 1965	Peter Doyle	"Speechless (The Pick Up)" / "Like I Love You"	
QK-935	Apr. 1965	The Blue Jays	"Zoom Gonk" / "Hey Jack"	
QK-951	Apr. 1965	Normie Rowe & The Playboys	"It Ain't Necessarily So" / "Gonna Leave This Town"	Produced by Pat Aulton
QK-952	1965	The Playboys	"Desperado" / "The Mean One"	
QK-983	May 1965	Tony Worsley & The Blue Jays	"Talking About You" / "I Dream of You"	
QK-984	May 1965	The Blue Jays	"Beat Out That Rhythm On a Drum" / "I'll Make You Cry Too"	
QK-985	1965	Marcie Jones	"I Wanna Know" / "Quiet"	
QK-999	1965	Toni McCann	"My Baby" / "No"	
QK-1000	1965	Ricky and Tammy	"Won't You Tell Me" / "Little Girl"	
QK-1001	June 1965	Peter Doyle	"Stupidity" / "Heigh Ho"	
QK-1041	1965	The Playboys	"He's Awright" / "Torture"	
QK-1069	June 1965	Normie Rowe & The Playboys	"I (Who Have Nothing)" / "I Just Don't Understand"	
QK-1103	Sep. 1965	Normie Rowe & The Playboys	"Que Sera Sera" / "Shakin' All Over"	Produced by Pat Aulton
QK-1105	1965	Marcie Jones	"I Just Can't Imagine" / "When A Girl Falls In Love"	
QK-1075	Sep. 1965*	Normie Rowe & The Playboys	"I Confess" / "Everything's Alright"	*withdrawn
QK-1087	Aug. 1965	Tony Worsley	"Velvet Waters" / "Rock-A-Billy"	Produced by Nat Kipner
QK-1105	1965	Marcie Jones	"I Just Can't Imagine" / "When A Girl Falls In Love"	
QK-1132	1965	The Five	"I'll Be There" / "How Can She Know"	
QK-1138	1965	The Purple Hearts	"Long Legged Baby" / "Here 'Tis"	
QK-1162	1965	The Librettos	"I Cried" / "She's a Go Go"	
QK-1137	Nov. 1965	Peter Doyle	"Watcha Gonna Do About It?" / "Do It Zula Style"	Produced by Pat Aulton
QK-1158	Nov. 1965	Normie Rowe & The Playboys	"Tell Him I'm Not Home" / "Call On Me"	
QK-1169	Nov. 1965	Tony Worsley	"Missing You" / "Lonely City"	
QK-1184	1965	Frankie Davidson	"Don't You Just Know It" / "So Little Time"	
QK-1182	Jan. 1966	Mike Furber & The Bowery Boys	"Just a Poor Boy" / "Mailman Bring Me No More Blues"	
LK-1208	1966	The Atlantics	"That's Old Fashioned" / "Gotta Lotta Love"	
QK-1198	1966	Ricky & Tammy	"Summers Long" / "All Around"	
QK-1207	Feb. 1966	Peter Doyle	"The Great Pretender" / "Everybody Loves a Lover"	
QK-1213	1966	The Purple Hearts	"Of Hopes and Dreams and Tombstones" / "I'm Gonna Try"	
QK-1237	1966	The Playboys	"Happy Organ" / "The High and the Mighty"	
QK-1238	Mar. 1966	Normie Rowe and the Playboys	"The Breaking Point" / "Ya Ya"	
QK-1241	Feb. 1966	Tony Worsley	"Something's Got a Hold On Me" / "Something"	
QK-1243	1966	Dave Howard	"Go Catch the Moon" / "What a Kiss Can Do"	
QK-1244	1966	The Five	"I Can't Find Her" / "There's a Time"	
QK-1244	1966	The Five	"I Can't Find Her" / "There's a Time"	
QK-1250	1966	Frankie Davidson	"The Dollar Auctioneer" / "Just For Today"	
QK-1251	1966	The Librettos	"Rescue Me" / "What Do You Want to Make Those Eyes at Me For?"	
QK-1227	Feb. 1966	Mike Furber & The Bowery Boys	"You Stole My Love" / "It's Gonna Work Out Fine"	released simultaneously as Kommotion KK-1227
QK-1317	1966	Peter Doyle	"Something You Got Baby" / "Go Away"	
QK-1318	1966	Marcie Jones	"Danny Boy" / "That Hurts"	
QK- 1341	1966	The Librettos	"Kicks" / "Watcha Gonna Do About It?"	Produced by Pat Aulton
QK-1343	1966	Ricky & Tammy	"Through My Fingers" / "Can I"	
QK-1344	June 1966	Normie Rowe and the Playboys	"Pride and Joy" / "The Stones That I Throw"	Produced by Pat Aulton
QK-1366	June 1966	Tony Worsley	"Raining In My Heart" / "Knocking on Wood"	
QK-1417	1966	Frankie Davidson	"Leave a Little Love" / "Clap Your Hands"	
QK-1382	1966	Tony Shepp	"Come On Over to My Place" / "Don't Ask Me Why"	
QK-1433	1966	The Atlantics	"It's a Hard Life / "Why Do You Treat Me Like You Do"	
QK-1442	1966	The Sounds of Seven	"Dominique" / "Daddy's Little Girl"	
QK-1448	1966	The Purple Hearts	"Early in the Morning" / "Just a Little Bit"	
QK-1453	1966	The Five	"Bright Lights, Big City" / "Wasting My Time"	
QK 1469	1966	The Lost Souls	"Peace of Mind" / "This Life of Mine"	
QK-1495	1966	Russ Kruger	"Keep Me Satisfied" / "Tell the Truth"	
QK-1529	1966	John Rowles(as Ja-Ar)	"Please Help Me I'm Falling" / "Girl Girl Girl"	
QIK-1565	Nov. 1966	Normie Rowe	"Ooh La La" / "Ain't Nobody Home"	
QIK-1605	Dec. 1966	Normie Rowe	"It's Not Easy" / "Mary Mary"	
QK-1531	Nov. 1966	Peter Doyle	"Tweedlee Dee" / "Mr Goodtime"	
QK-1556	Jan. 1967	Tony Worsley	"No Worries" / "Humpy Dumpy"	
QK-1557	Jan. 1967	The Atlantics	"I Put A Spell On You" / "By the Glow of a Candle"	
QK-1567	1967	Marcie Jones	"That's the Way It Is" / "Big Lovers Come in Small Packages"	
QK-1589	1967	The Purple Hearts	"You Can't Sit Down" / "Tiger in Your Tank"	
QK-1590	1967	Ricky & Tammy	"We Don't Do That Anymore" / "Paradise"	
QK-1633	1967	Russ Kruger	"Look At My Baby" / "My Little Girl"	
QK-1691	1967	The Atlantics	"You Tell Me Why" / "Come On"	
QK-1692	1967	Bill & Boyd	"Two By Two" / "Symphony For Susan"	
QK-1717	1967	The Running Jumping Standing Still	"Diddy Wah Diddy" / "My Girl"	
QK-1718	1967	Marcie Jones	"You Can't Bypass Love" / "He's Gonna Be Fine Fine Fine"	
QIK-1731	Apr. 1967	Normie Rowe	"Going Home" / "I Don't Care"	
QK-1733	1967	Mouse	"(Wear A) Yellow Raincoat" / "Pink Fairy Floss"	
QK-1736	1967	The Purple Hearts	"Chicago" / "Bring It on Home"	
QK-1772	1967	Julian Jones & The Breed	"Regrets" / "No Matter What You Do"	
QK-1817	1967	Normie Rowe	"I Live in the Sunshine" / "Far Beyond the Call of Duty"	
QK-1820	June 1967	Normie Rowe	"But I Know" / "Sunshine Secret"	
QK-1839	1967	Bill and Boyd	"If I Were a Rich Man" / "Little Miss Sorrow, Child of Tomorrow"	
QK-1849	1967	Mike Furber	"It's Too Late" / "I'm So Glad"	
QK-1858	1967	The Escorts	"The House on Soul Hill" / "Sound of Your Voice"	
QK-1859	1967	Ross D. Wyliewith the Escorts	"Short Skirts" / "Paper Bunnies"	
QIK-1872	1967	The Playboys	"Black Sheep RIP" / "Sad"	
QK-1819	1967	The Running Jumping Standing Still	"She's Good To Me" / "Little Girl"	
QK-2022	1967	Ross D. Wylie	"A Bit of Love" / "Last Day in Town"	
QK-2008	Oct. 1967	Normie Rowe	"Turn Down Day" / "Stop to Think It Over"	
FK-1986	1967	Bill & Boyd	"Les Marionettes" / "She Chased Me"	
QK-1998	1967	The Escorts	"On a Day Like Today" / "Sitting By a Tree"	
QK-2012	1967	Mike Furber	"Bring Your Love Back Home" / "If You Need Me"	
QK-2014	Oct. 1967	Tony Worsley	"Reaching Out" / "Do You Mind"	
QK-2225	Mar. 1968	Rev. Black & The Rockin' Vicars	"Down to the Last 500" (Vanda-Young) / "Sugar Train"	Produced by Pat Aulton -- #30 Brisbane, 4 weeks
QK-2238	May 1968	Normie Rowe	"Penelope" (Brian Peacock) / "Lucinda" (Brian Peacock)	
QK-1728	1968	Tony Williams	"If You Lose Her" / "It's Alright Now"	
QK-2381	1968	Jonne Sands	"It's Your Life" / "I'll Never Dance Again"	
QK-2479	1968	Rev. Black & The Rockin' Vicars	"Such A Lovely Day" / "Sorrowful Stoney"	Produced by Ron Dalton
QK-2458	1968	Jonne Sands	"Mothers and Fathers" / "Isn't It"	
QK-2493	Aug. 1968	Normie Rowe	"Born to Be By Your Side" / "Break Out"	
QK-2514	1968	Johnny Mac & The Zodiacs	"Mister Sticker Licker" / "Just Step Back"	
QK-2596	Oct. 1968	Normie Rowe	"Walking on New Grass" / "Open Up The Skies"	
QK-2577	1968	Jonne Sands	"Change of Mind" / "Gingerbread Man"	
QK-2693	1968	Geraldine Fitzgerald	"Something to Think About" / "Let's Go"	
QK-2752	1969	Rev. Black and the Rockin' Vicars	"Walking and Talking" / "How Does It Feel?"	Produced by Pat Aulton
QK-2819	1969	Normie Rowe	"Just To Satisfy You" / "Drinkin Wine Spo-Dee-O-Dee"	
QK-2880	1969	Jonne Sands	"Let the Sunshine In" / "Wish It Were You"	
QK-2890	June 1969	Normie Rowe	"You Got Style" / "Don't Say Nothing Bad (About My Baby)"	
QK-2982	1969	Coloured Rain	"Angie" / "What More Do You Want"	
QK-2983	1969	Jonne Sands	"Yeah I'm Hip" / "I've Just Seen a Face"	
QK-3115	1969	Inside Looking Out	"Long Live Sivananda" / "On Whom Her Favour Falls"	
QK-3118	1969	Wickedy Wak	"Billie's Bikie Boys" / "Chitty Chitty Bang Band"	Produced by Ian Meldrum
QK-3183	1970	Jonne Sands	"Oh Girl" / "Confessions of a Lonely Man"	
QK-4085	1971	Normie Rowe & The Playboys	"Que Sera Sera" / "Let Me Tell You"	re-release
QK-4412	1971	Jelly Roll Big Band	"I've Been Away Too Long" / "Son Of a Preacher Man"	

== See also ==
- List of record labels
