= Nat Kipner =

American songwriter and record producer (1924–2009)

- Born: Nathan Kipner; October 2, 1924; Dayton, Ohio, U.S.
- Died: December 1, 2009 (aged 85); West Hills, California, U.S.
- Occupation(s): Songwriter, record producer
- Children: Steve Kipner

Nathan Kipner (October 2, 1924 – December 1, 2009) was an American songwriter and record producer with a considerable career in Australia. He is remembered as the producer of the Bee Gees' first hit "Spicks and Specks". He was the father of Steve Kipner who is also a songwriter and music producer.

== History ==
Kipner was born in Dayton, Ohio, on 2 October 1924.

He joined the US Army Air Corps shortly before the US entered World War II in 1941, having lied about his age, and served with Supply, 4ADG (4th Air Depot Group) which became 81st Air Depot Group. He arrived in Brisbane, Australia, aboard the SS President Coolidge on 26 December 1941, later serving in Finschhafen, Papua New Guinea.

Kipner married Alma Dorothy Moore, of Albion, Queensland, at Holy Trinity, Brisbane on 4 November 1944. They lived in America until the early 1950s, when they returned to Brisbane with their young son, Steve. There, Nat found work with the newly established home appliance department of Queensland Home Furnishers, in Queen Street, Petrie Bight.

After hosting a live to air pop music programme on Brisbane TV, he joined entrepreneur Ivan Dayman's "Sunshine" artist and venue management company, and moved to Sydney, where he produced hit records "Shakin' All Over" and "Que Sera, Sera" for Normie Rowe and "Velvet Waters" for Tony Worsley, on Sunshine Records.

In 1965, he became A&R manager for Clyde Packer, helping him found the record label "Spin". Kipner signed up the Bee Gees, whose career with the Festival label had gone nowhere, and co-produced their first hit, "Spicks and Specks". Kipner moved to the UK in the late 1960s and worked as a writer and record producer. He returned to the USA after Johnny Mathis and Deniece Williams had a global hit with the song he co-wrote, "Too Much Too Little Too Late".

Kipner died on 1 December 2009, at West Hills, California, aged 85, survived by his wife Alma and son Steve.

== Songwriting credits ==
Kipner wrote or co-wrote (principally the lyrics to) a great number of popular songs, among them:

- "Saturday Date" theme song for Saturday Date, which was recorded by Toni McCann
- "Cheryl Moana Marie" (w/ John Rowles); recorded by John Rowles
- "Got a Zac in the Back of Me Pocket"; Johnny Devlin
- "How Can I Make It on My Own"; Co-Co
- "I Found a New Love"; Lonnie Lee
- "Keep Singing Those Love Songs"; Co-Co
- "Too Much, Too Little, Too Late"; Johnny Mathis and Deniece Williams
