= Que Sera, Sera (Whatever Will Be, Will Be) =

Popular song by Jay Livingston and Ray Evans

"Qué Será, Será (Whatever Will Be, Will Be)"
- French 7" vinyl single cover

Single by Doris Day
- B-side: "I've Gotta Sing Away These Blues"
- Released: May 21, 1956
- Recorded: 1956
- Genre: Popular music
- Length: 2:03
- Label: Columbia
- Composer: Jay Livingston
- Lyricist: Ray Evans

Doris Day singles chronology
"We'll Love Again" (1956)	"Qué Será, Será (Whatever Will Be, Will Be)" (1956)	"Julie" (1956)

"Qué Será, Será (Whatever Will Be, Will Be)" (Note: "Que Sera, Sera (Whatever Will Be, Will Be)" is the title on the song's official sheet music, but it has been rendered in various ways in other sources. The order of the main title and parenthetical may be swapped, as when the song was nominated for the Academy Award as "Whatever Will Be, Will Be (Que Sera, Sera)". It may also be referred to as simply "Que Sera, Sera", or "Whatever Will Be, Will Be". The title sequence of The Man Who Knew Too Much gives the title as "Whatever Will Be". Rarely, the title is rendered with diacritics as "Que Será, Será".) is a song written by Jay Livingston and Ray Evans and first published in 1955. Doris Day introduced it in the Alfred Hitchcock film The Man Who Knew Too Much (1956), singing it as a cue to their onscreen kidnapped son. The three verses of the song progress through the life of the narrator—from childhood, through young adulthood and falling in love, to parenthood—and each asks "What will I be?" or "What lies ahead?" The chorus repeats the answer: "What will be, will be."

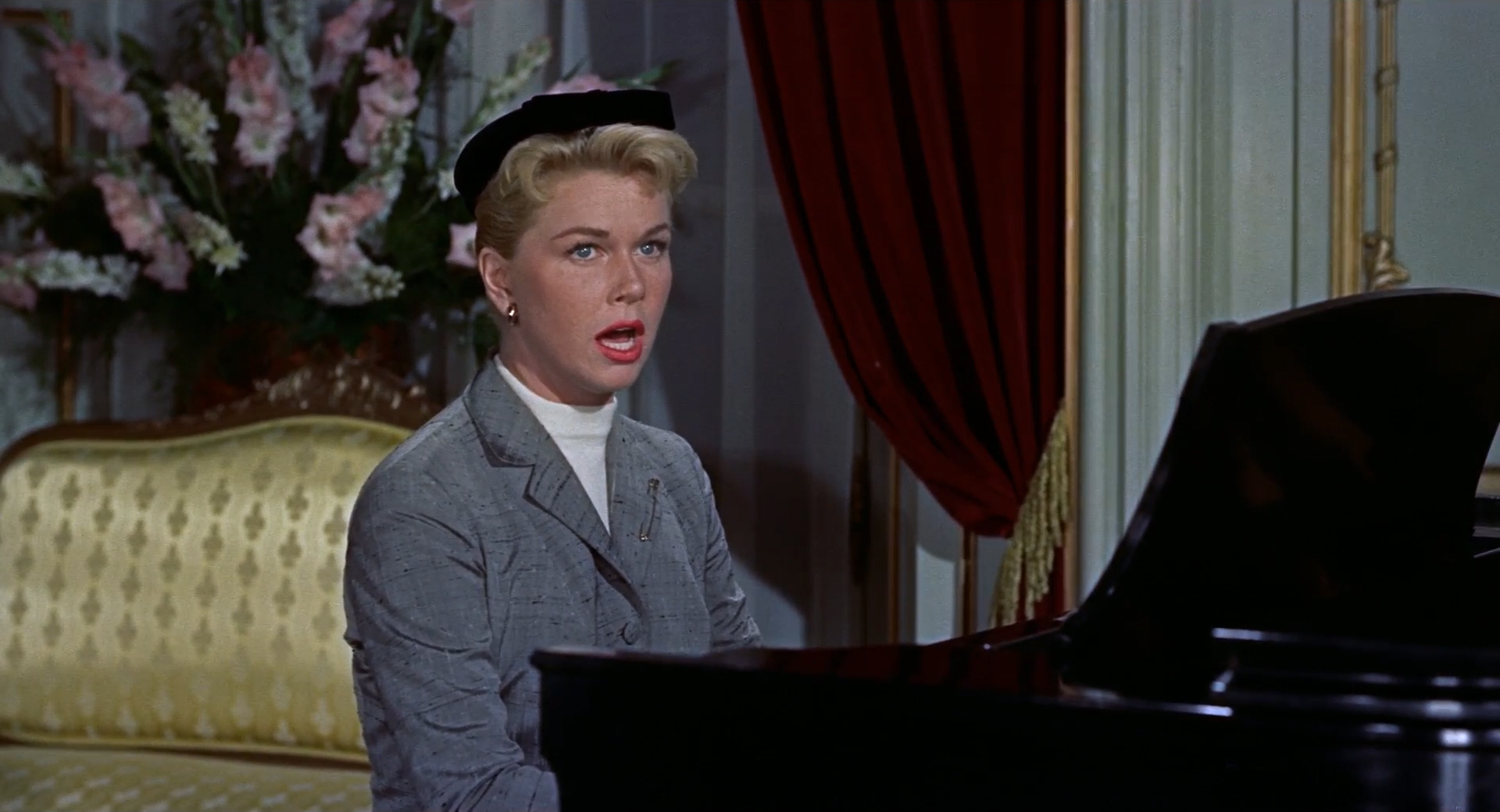
Doris Day performing the song in the 1956 film The Man Who Knew Too Much

Day's recording of the song for Columbia Records made it to number two on the Billboard Top 100 chart and number one in the UK Singles Chart. It came to be known as Day's signature song. The song in The Man Who Knew Too Much received the 1956 Academy Award for Best Original Song. It was the third Oscar in this category for Livingston and Evans, who previously won in 1948 and 1950. In 2004 it finished at number 48 in AFI's 100 Years...100 Songs survey of top tunes in American cinema. In 2012, the 1956 recording by Doris Day on Columbia Records was inducted into the Grammy Hall of Fame.

It was a number-one hit in Australia for pop singer Normie Rowe in September 1965.

The song popularized the title expression "que sera, sera" to express "cheerful fatalism", though its use in English dates back to at least the 16th century. The phrase is evidently a word-for-word mistranslation of the English "What will be will be", as in Spanish, it would be "lo que será, será".

== Title phrase ==
The phrase "qué será, será" in its Spanish spelling and in the Italian spelling "che sarà sarà" are first documented in the 16th century as an English heraldic motto. The Spanish spelling appears on a brass plaque in the Church of St. Nicholas, Thames Ditton, Surrey, dated 1559. The Italian form was first adopted as a family motto by either John Russell, 1st Earl of Bedford, or his son, Francis Russell, 2nd Earl of Bedford. It may have been adopted by the elder Russell after his experience at the Battle of Pavia (1525), and to be engraved on his tomb (1555 N.S.). The 2nd Earl's adoption of the motto is commemorated in a manuscript dated 1582. Their successors—the Earls and, later, Dukes of Bedford, sixth creation, as well as other aristocratic families—continued to use the motto. Soon afterwards, it appeared in Christopher Marlowe's play Doctor Faustus (1590), using the archaic Italian spelling "Che sera, sera". Early in the 17th century the saying begins to appear in the speech and thoughts of fictional characters as a spontaneous expression of a fatalistic attitude. The English "what will be, will be" is used in Hard Times by Charles Dickens (1854).

The saying is always in an English-speaking context, and was evidently a word-for-word mistranslation of English "What will be will be", using the free relative pronoun what. In Spanish, Italian, French, or Portuguese, "what" must be translated as "that which" (lo que, quel che, ce qui, o que). The composer Jay Livingston had seen the 1954 Hollywood film The Barefoot Contessa, in which a fictional Italian family has the motto "Che sarà sarà" carved in stone at their ancestral mansion. He immediately wrote it down as a possible song title, and he and the lyricist Ray Evans later gave it a Spanish spelling "because there are so many Spanish-speaking people in the world".

In modern times, thanks to the popularity of the song and its many translations, the phrase has been adopted in countries around the world to name a variety of entities, including books, movies, restaurants, vacation rentals, airplanes, and race horses.

== In film and television ==
The song originally appeared in the Alfred Hitchcock film The Man Who Knew Too Much, where it serves an important role in the film's plot. In the film, Day plays a retired popular singer, Jo Conway McKenna, who, along with her husband (played by Jimmy Stewart) and son, becomes embroiled in a plot to assassinate a foreign prime minister. After foiling the assassination attempt, Jo and her husband are invited by the prime minister to the embassy, where they believe their young son is being held by the conspirators. Jo sits at a piano and plays "Que Sera, Sera", singing loudly in the hope of reaching her son. Upon hearing his mother play the familiar song, her son whistles along, allowing her husband to find and rescue him just before he was to be murdered by the conspirators to the assassination attempt.

"Que Sera Sera" came to be considered Doris Day's signature song, and she went on to sing it in later films and TV appearances. In 1960's Please Don't Eat the Daisies, she sings a snippet of the song to her co-star, David Niven, who plays her husband. In the 1966 film The Glass Bottom Boat she sings a snippet accompanied by Arthur Godfrey on ukulele. From 1968 to 1973, she sang a rerecorded version as the theme song for her sitcom The Doris Day Show. The 1999 Studio Ghibli film My Neighbors the Yamadas features a Japanese cover of the song toward the end of the film. Director Isao Takahata wrote the translation for the lyrics, with an arrangement by Neko Saitou.

Versions of the song have appeared on a number of film and television soundtracks, often juxtaposed with dark or disastrous events either to create an effect of black comedy or convey a poignant message. For example, in The Simpsons episode "Bart's Comet", the song is sung by the citizens of Springfield in anticipation of an impending comet strike that threatens to wipe out the town and kill them all. In an episode of The Muppet Show starring Vincent Price, Shakey Sanchez, a pink/purple red-and-purple-haired Muppet, sings the song after Behemoth eats him and sings "I've Got You Under My Skin". Previously, the song was featured over the opening and the ending credits of Heathers, a dark teen comedy dealing with murder and suicide. The version over the opening credits is performed by Syd Straw and the version over the ending credits is performed by Sly and the Family Stone. In Gilmore Girls, the song appeared in a season 2 episode as a musical cue to juxtapose Lorelai falling through their termite-ridden porch. In 2009, the song appeared in a climactic scene in Mary and Max as Mary is about to commit suicide. A 2010 commercial for Thai Life Insurance also juxtaposes the song and its message with a choir of disabled children performing to it.

In 1956, the song was covered by The Lennon Sisters on The Lawrence Welk Show.

On December 21, 1996, it was covered by the Bina Vokalia Children's Choir under the direction of Pranadjaja on Dendang Buah Hati concert.

A version by The Pixies, specifically recorded for the show, is used in the opening title sequence in the series From.

In 2003, a cover version by Pink Martini was used in the pilot episode of the TV series Dead Like Me.

== As football chant ==
"Que Sera, Sera" has been adapted as a popular celebratory football chant, especially in England, typically with the lyrics:

Que sera sera,
Whatever will be will be,
We're going to Wembley,
Que sera sera

This would be sung by fans following a victory that progresses their favoured team to the next round of a competition that will ultimately lead them to Wembley Stadium (typically the FA Cup, the finals of which have been held in Wembley since 1923). Manchester United fans sang it before and during the 1976 FA Cup Final. Although the song became more commonly used to associate a good cup run, Everton fans used it in 1963 to hail their soon to be crowned League Champions, using the phrase win the League instead of Wembley.

"Wembley" may be sung with either melisma on the first syllable, or a schwa epenthesis (often respelled "Wemberley" or "Wemberlee"). Other venues than Wembley may be substituted as appropriate, as when Republic of Ireland fans sang "We're going to Italy" when qualifying for the 1990 World Cup, or when fans of Millwall, about to exit the 2016–17 FA Cup, self-deprecatingly sang "We're going to Shrewsbury", their unglamorous next League One fixture.

== 1964 version ==
"Whatever Will Be, Will Be (Que Sera, Sera)"

Song by Doris Day

from the album With a Smile and a Song
- Released: October 19, 1964
- Recorded: July 1964
- Genre: Children's music
- Label: Columbia
- Producer: Allen Stanton

In 1964, Day re-recorded the song for her 1964 children's album With a Smile and a Song. This version featured Jimmy Joyce and the Children's Chorus, was recorded in July 1964, and was issued by Columbia Records three months later as the eighth track on the album. This version was produced by Allen Stanton and was arranged and conducted by Allyn Ferguson.

== Normie Rowe version ==
"Que Sera, Sera (Whatever Will Be, Will Be)"

Single by Normie Rowe and the Playboys
- B-side: "Shakin' All Over"
- Released: September 1965
- Genre: Pop
- Label: Sunshine
- Composer: Ray Evans
- Lyricist: Jay Livingston
- Producer: Pat Aulton

Normie Rowe and the Playboys singles chronology
"I Confess" (1965)	"Que Sera, Sera (Whatever Will Be, Will Be)" (1965)	"Tell Him I'm Not Home" (1965)

Australian pop singer Normie Rowe's 1965 recording of "Que Sera, Sera", which was produced by Pat Aulton on the Sunshine Record label (Sunshine QK 1103), was the biggest hit of his career, "the biggest Australian rock 'n roll hit of 1965", and is reputed to be the biggest-selling Australian single of the 1960s. The song was "done in the style of "Louie, Louie" and the manner of "Hang On Sloopy", and given a "Merseybeat" treatment (in the manner of The Beatles' "Twist & Shout"), and was backed by Rowe's band The Playboys. It was paired with a version of the Johnny Kidd & The Pirates' classic "Shakin' All Over", and the single became a double-sided No. 1 hit in most capitals (#1 Sydney, #1 Melbourne, #1 Brisbane, #1 Adelaide, and Perth). in September 1965, charting for 28 weeks and selling in unprecedented numbers, with Rock historian Ian McFarlane reporting sales of 80,000 copies, while 1970s encyclopedist Noel McGrath claimed sales of 100,000.

Rowe scored another first in October 1965 when "Que Sera Sera" became his third hit single in the Melbourne Top 40 simultaneously. In 1965 Rowe received a gold record for "Que Sera, Sera" at Sydney's Chevron Hotel. In December 1965 the master of Rowe's version was purchased by Jay-Gee Records for release in the United States. In April 1966 Rowe received a second gold record for the sales of "Que Sera, Sera". In August 1966 Rowe won Radio 5KA's annual best male vocal award for "Que Sera, Sera". In 2006 Rowe released a newly recorded version, which was released by ABC via iTunes, and later adding "the whole digital mix with a radio mix and a dance mix".

== Other notable versions ==
In the decades since the song's original release, "Que Sera, Sera" has been covered by dozens of artists. A 1969 cover sung by Mary Hopkin and produced by Paul McCartney reached number 77 on the Billboard Hot 100, and number 7 on the Adult Contemporary chart.

The song was covered in 1973 by Sly And The Family Stone on their album, Fresh, one of very few cover songs within the band's recorded catalog.

A live version by Shakin' Stevens was featured on The Shakin' Stevens EP, which reached No. 2 in the UK Charts in 1982. The studio version of the song is featured on his album Give Me Your Heart Tonight from the same year.

In 1989, a comedy version recorded by "Terence" (John Creedon) in aid of the RTÉ People in Need Telethon reached number 2 in the Irish Singles Chart.

As a result of the song's immediate popularity following the release of The Man Who Knew Too Much, versions were soon written in other languages. An early example was a Dutch version by Jo Leemans, which reached the Belgian charts in December 1956. Versions of the song have also been recorded in Danish, French, Mandarin, Spanish, Japanese, and Swedish, among other languages. These in turn have led some non-English speakers to adopt the saying "que sera, sera".

In 1964, Nana Mouskouri performed a German version ("Was sein soll, wird sein", though the "Spanish" phrase is also included), as part of a longer TV show nominally about the Oscars.

In 1965, Swedish rock band Lenne and the Lee Kings recorded the song. Upon release as a single during the summer of that year, record label Gazell coupled it with the Titus Turner song "Sticks and Stones" on the B-side. Although it failed to chart in native Sweden, it reached number 38 in Finland in August 1965. Both sides of the single were included on their 1966 album Stop The Music.

In India, the song was first adapted in the Tamil-language film Aaravalli (1957). Later in 1965, the original version was sung by Bhanumathi in the Telugu-language film Thodu Needa, with minor changes in the lyrics.

== In other music ==
Urban contemporary band Lisa Lisa and Cult Jam paid homage to the song in their second number-one single, "Lost in Emotion". The lyrics include the lines:

I'm, baby, I'm lost in emotion
Am I a fool? At least my friends think so
Qué será, qué será
Baby, whatever will be
Qué será, qué será
Between you and me, oh-ooh.
