= Festival Records =

Australian record label

- Genre: Pop
- Founded: 1952
- Founder: Paul Cullen
- Defunct: 2005
- Fate: Defunct
- Headquarters: Pyrmont, New South Wales, Australia
- Parent: Warner Music Group

Festival Records, later known as Festival Mushroom Records, was an Australian recording and publishing company founded in Sydney, Australia, in 1952 and operated until 2005.

Festival was a subsidiary of News Limited from 1961 to 2005. The company was successful for most of its 50-year life, despite the fact that as much as 90% of its annual profit was regularly siphoned off by Rupert Murdoch to subsidise his other media ventures.

== Early years ==
Festival was established by one of Australia's first merchant banking companies, Mainguard, founded by entrepreneur and former Australian army officer Paul Cullen. Mainguard had a wide range of investments including one of Australia's first supermarket companies, and a whaling business and also backed famed Australian filmmaker Charles Chauvel.

The origin of Festival was Mainguard's purchase and merging of two small Sydney businesses—a record pressing company, Microgroove Australia, one of the first Australian companies to produce discs in the new vinyl microgroove record format, and Casper Precision Engineering. After buying the two companies Cullen reincorporated them as Festival Records on 21 October 1952; soon after he appointed popular Sydney bandleader Les Welch as the label's first artists and repertoire (A&R) manager. Another early staff member was Bruce Gyngell, who was later hired to help found Australia's first commercial TV station, TCN-9, in Sydney and was the first person to appear on television in Australia in 1956. The connection between Nine and Festival would reap great benefits for the label in the late 1950s and early 1960s.

Festival was able to gain a foothold in the Australian music market mainly thanks to Welch, who acquired the Australian rights to the epoch-making Bill Haley record "Rock Around the Clock". The single had originally been turned down by the Australian division of EMI in 1954, when it was first released in the United States, but Welch was able to trump EMI and secure the Australian rights to the recording for Festival in 1955, after the song became a big hit in America and Britain thanks to its inclusion in the film Blackboard Jungle. "Rock Around the Clock" became the biggest-selling record ever released in Australia up to that time, and it established Festival as a significant emerging player in the popular music market.

When Mainguard began diverting Festival's profits into its other businesses, Welch resigned. He was replaced by disc jockey and former record store clerk Ken Taylor. Like Welch, Taylor did not like rock 'n' roll, but he was an astute spotter and marketer of new talent. Thanks to Taylor, Festival was the first local label to sign Australian rock 'n' roll acts, including Australia's "Big Three" acts of the 1950s: Johnny O'Keefe and the Dee Jays, Col Joye and the Joy Boys and Dig Richards and the R'Jays. Festival's sales trebled, but by this time Mainguard was in serious financial straits and in 1957 Cullen sold Festival to property magnate LJ Hooker.

Hooker was an avid music fan and reportedly took a keen personal interest in the company, even establishing his own boutique imprint label, Rex, named after the Sydney hotel that he owned. During this time, Festival had its first home-grown hit with Johnny O'Keefe's "Wild One" (aka "Real Wild Child"), a song covered in the US by Jerry Allison of the Crickets (as Ivan) in 1958 and also recorded by Jerry Lee Lewis for Sun Records. Both artists had heard O'Keefe perform the song during their 1958 Aussie tour and rush recorded the song on their return to the US. This Festival success was followed by four #1 hits in 1959 for another local act, Col Joye & the Joy Boys. But despite the chart success, Festival continued to lose money due to poor management and a lack of international acts on its roster, and Hooker eventually sold it on to Rupert Murdoch's News Limited in 1961, shortly after Murdoch's attempt to acquire the Australian division of the American Ampar label.

As with the Bill Haley single, Festival was again saved by a then-unknown American act—in this case, Herb Alpert & the Tijuana Brass, who had been recommended to Festival in 1962 by top Sydney DJ Bob Rogers. The Tijuana Brass' breakthrough record, "The Lonely Bull" became a worldwide hit and its success in Australia enabled Festival to sign a crucial distribution deal with Alpert's label A&M Records, who supplied Festival with a stream of top-selling U.S. acts such as the Carpenters.

Under the astute direction of long-serving company chairman Alan Hely, Festival quickly rose to become one of the top pop labels in Australasia (although the New Zealand operation was a standalone company with differing ownership and management), and through the late 1960s and early 1970s it rivalled and often surpassed the local market leader EMI. Hely built up a strong roster by cultivating Australian talent and establishing distribution deals with important local independent labels like Spin Records and Clarion Records in the 1960s and Mushroom Records in the 1970s. He also signed crucial distribution deals with major overseas labels like Island Records, Chrysalis Records, Arista Records and A&M Records which gave Festival exclusive Australian rights to a steady stream of international hit albums and singles.

Festival played a major role in the Australian pop scene of the mid-to-late 1960s, and it competed strongly with its overseas-owned rivals EMI, CBS and RCA. Festival recorded or distributed some of the most popular Australian acts of the decade, including country music star Reg Lindsay. Lindsay received citations and awards from Festival management and the Australian Record Industry in the 1960s and 1970s for outstanding record sales and his promotion of country music nationally and internationally] the Delltones, Warren Williams, Billy Thorpe, the Bee Gees, Ray Brown & the Whispers, Tony Worsley & the Fabulous Blue Jays, Jimmy Little, Noeleen Batley, Mike Furber, Olivia Newton-John, the Dave Miller Set, Johnny Young, Jamie Redfern, Wild Cherries and Jeff St John.

An important factor in the company's success during the pop boom of the 1960s was the pressing and distribution deals it made with the many small independent pop labels that emerged in this period. Notable among these were the Sunshine Records and Kommotion Records labels established by Ivan Dayman in 1964, Martin Clarke's Perth based Clarion Records and the Sydney-based pop label Spin Records, a partnership between publisher Clyde Packer and promoter Harry M Miller.

A large proportion of the recordings released on Sunshine, Kommmotion and Spin were overseen by producer Pat Aulton, who became one of Festival's house producers from 1966 until the early 1970s. Aulton was probably responsible for more Australian-made hits than any other record producer of his era. Aulton began his career as a singer in the Adelaide band the Clefs, then became an A&R manager for the Sunshine label, where he produced many of that label's releases, including hits by Normie Rowe. When Dayman's mini-empire collapsed in 1966, Aulton discovered that he had unwittingly been named as a partner in the record label and this made him liable for its debts. As a result, he had most of his assets seized by creditors. He was rescued by Festival MD Fred Marks, who offered him a job as a house producer for Festival, overseeing all the pop side of the company's business. Aulton supervised the installation of Festival's new 4-track studio at Pyrmont later that year and he oversaw most of the company's pop/rock output between 1967 and 1970, including producing an album and an Australian hit single for American singer-songwriter Neil Sedaka.

== Growth and consolidation ==
In January 1971, Festival established a new progressive music label, Infinity Records (not related to the U.S. MCA affiliated label of the same name, see Infinity Records.) Early Infinity releases included Kahvas Jute, Billy Thorpe & the Aztecs and Blackfeather. Infinity's biggest successes were Sydney band Sherbet, who became the most popular and successful local band of the early Seventies and one of the most successful Australian groups of all time, and singer-songwriter Richard Clapton; both acts were produced by Richard Batchens, who succeeded Pat Aulton as Festival's main house producer. In 1979 Mark Moffatt replaced Batchens as house producer, bringing much of the Mushroom recording in house.

Another notable success for Festival in this period was Sister Janet Mead. The Adelaide-based nun was an experienced music teacher who had been using pop music in religious ceremonies to involve young people and had provided music for "rock Mass" events. In 1973 Mead came to Sydney to record with Festival house producer Martin Erdman and one of the tracks from that session, a rock arrangement of "The Lord's Prayer", was released as the B-side of her first single. After being picked up by radio it became one of the surprise hits of the year, reaching #3 on the Australian Singles Chart (Kent Music Report) in 1974. It was also a huge success in America, reaching No. 4 on the Billboard Hot 100, becoming the first Australian recording to sell over one million copies in the United States, earning a Gold Award for Sister Janet Mead and Martin Erdman. It also earned a Grammy Award nomination and Golden Gospel Award in 2004.

Although the American-owned companies Warner Music Group and CBS considerably expanded their local presence and market share during this period, Festival enjoyed continuing success during the late 1970s and mid to late 1980s under the helm of managing director Jim White, and also thanks in part to its alliance with the Melbourne based Mushroom Records label and the Sydney-based Regular Records label, whose roster included top selling bands such as Icehouse, Mental As Anything and the Cockroaches (which later evolved into the hugely successful children's act The Wiggles). Both Mushroom and Regular recorded much of the best new Australian music of the time.

In the late 1980s change swept through the music industry and vinyl was rapidly supplanted by the new compact disc format which Festival embraced. However it started to lose manufacturing revenue at this point because of how predominant its vinyl and cassette pressing business was and because of the lack of CD manufacturing facilities for Festival, whose revenue was also dented by the loss of many of the successful independent overseas labels it had formerly distributed, notably Island Records, A&M and Chrysalis; some deals ended due to overseas labels opening local branches, while others were lost when these former independents (e.g. Virgin, Charisma) were taken over by major labels like PolyGram, BMG (Bertelsmann Music Group), Sony Music, Warner Music Group (which would absorb Festival), and EMI. The loss of these overseas labels took a sizeable chunk out of Festival's profits, a problem compounded by Murdoch's persistent siphoning-off of Festival's profits, leaving it without the cash reserves it needed to invest in new plant, new acts and new labels.

In 1995, Alan Hely was nearing retirement, but he agreed to stay on to tutor Rupert Murdoch's younger son, James, who, to the surprise of many in the industry, was appointed as Festival's chairman despite then being only 23 and with no significant business experience. James Murdoch had a reputation as the Murdoch family rebel; he bleached his hair and for some time sported an eyebrow stud and, to his family's dismay, he had just dropped out of Harvard University to set up a hip-hop label, Rawkus Records, which for a time was the United States' premier hip-hop label, boasting Mos Def, Company Flow and others.

Hely stayed on for some time after the appointment, but he resigned earlier than he had planned after disagreements with Murdoch; MD Bill Eeg took the reins for a short period before but resigned after the appointment of Roger Grierson, a one-time member of Sydney '80s new wave band The Thought Criminals and a former manager of Nick Cave.

In 1997, Grierson set about rebuilding Festival's profile, negotiating new licensing/distribution/promotion deals with a group of prestige Australian independent labels including W.Minc, Half a Cow, Reliant Records, Global Records, Clan Analogue, and Psy-Harmonics as well as international licences including TVT Records, Walt Disney Records/Hollywood Records/Mammoth Records, Chris Blackwell's Palm Pictures, V2 Records and later on prestigious Australian label Albert Productions, the home of AC/DC

Under Grierson and Murdoch's management, Festival bought out Michael Gudinski's controlling 51% share of Mushroom Records in 1999. The two companies were then merged and renamed Festival Mushroom Records (FMR).

Several notable industry figures were hired as executives, including Jeremy Fabinyi (former artist manager and ex-head of AMCOS), Paul Dickson, former head of Polygram Australia, respected musician Mark Callaghan (ex-Riptides, GANGgajang) and industry veteran and former Larrikin Records boss Warren Fahey. The company also established an online music site, Whammo, which offered online CD sales as well as hosting an online version of Ian McFarlane's Encyclopedia of Australian Rock and Pop. The company had #1 records with Motor Ace, 28 Days, George, Amiel, Kylie Minogue and others under licence and distribution arrangements including Moby, Madonna, Britney Spears and Michael Crawford. They also had the highest selling album of 2002 with the soundtrack to Baz Luhrmann's Moulin Rouge. "Addicted to Bass" went to #2 in the UK charts and the band had top ten records in Japan through a licence arrangement with Sony Music Japan. In 2002, FMR had more #1 singles and more #1 albums than any other company.

In 2000, James Murdoch was appointed to head Star TV and moved to Hong Kong.

Festival celebrated its fiftieth anniversary in 2002 with a major museum exhibition and a series of commemorative CDs. News Ltd poured millions into Festival in the decade between 1995 and 2005; James Murdoch reportedly spent A$10 million on artists and repertoire. The company won both the Song of the Year and Songwriter of the Year ARIA award in 2004 with Powderfinger and Amiel.

Despite these successes, revenues continued to fall and by 2006 the company was in dire financial straits. In October, FMR announced that its recorded music assets had been sold to Warner Music Australia. Festival Mushroom's offices in five cities were closed and 43 of the company's 54 remaining staff were retrenched, with eleven senior management, promotions and marketing staff moved into positions at Warner.

The combined Festival Mushroom Records–Warner Bros. Records recording archive contains a large proportion of the most important Australian pop and rock music of the late 20th century, and the collection is said to contain more than 20,000 master tapes, including music by Johnny O'Keefe, the Bee Gees, Peter Allen, Sherbet, Olivia Newton-John, Timbaland, Nelly Furtado, Madonna, Mika and Kylie Minogue.

Another major FMR asset, Festival Studios, was acquired by ex-Festival Studios engineer Tom Misner, who acquired Studios 301 the same year. Similarly, Festival Music Publishing, was acquired in November 2005 by Michael Gudinski's Mushroom Publishing, for an undisclosed sum.

== 2015 revival ==
In 2015, the Festival Records label was revived with the first album 100 Greatest Australian Singles of the 60s.

== Labels ==
=== Local labels ===
- Mushroom Records (merged with company in 1998)
- Best Boy (soundtrack label; formed in 1998)
- Bazmark Music (joint venture in 2001)
- Spin Records (distribution from 1966 to 1974; purchased catalogue after liquidation and briefly revived as a reissue label in 2000)
- Infinity Records (subsidiary formed in 1971)
- Larrikin Records (acquired in 1995)
- Walkabout Records (jazz sublabel)
- Festival Kids
- Vital Records
- Interfusion Records
- F1 Records
- Walsingham Classics
