= Toni McCann =

English-Australian musician

- Also known as: Toni McRae, Toni Nicholas, Sue Collier
- Born: Susan Judith Hutson; 1950 or 1951 (age 75–76); London, England
- Origin: Brisbane, Queensland, Australia
- Genres: Garage rock, R&B
- Occupation: Musician
- Instruments: Vocals, harmonica
- Labels: Sunshine, Everybody's, Good Thyme

Toni McCann (or Toni McRae) (born Susan Judith Hutson, 1950 or 1951) is an English-born Australian singer-musician. She fronted groups, worked as a solo artist and in the duo Toni and Royce with Royston Edward Nicholas. McCann issued two popular singles in the mid-1960s, "My Baby" and "If You Don't Come Back". These were described by Australian musicologist, Ian McFarlane as "among the wildest garage beat songs of the era". The singer displayed "her rowdy, nasally vocal delivery and wailing harmonica playing". McCann and Nicholas were married by 1970 and continued their duo into the 1980s delivering Australiana-based children's albums. Nicholas died in 2013. From 2017 McCann has worked as a prison chaplain.

== Biography ==
Toni McCann was born in 1950 or 1951 as Suisan Judith Hutson, in London. She migrated with her parents to Brisbane in August 1964 via Fairsky. While still in England, McCann had been inspired to become a musician after seeing Helen Shapiro on television and attending a Rolling Stones concert. At 15 she entered a Brisbane talent quest where she met record producers Pat Aulton and Nat Kipner. The pair introduced her to promoter and Sunshine Records founder Ivan Dayman, who signed her to his label and she joined his East Coast touring circuit.

McCann provided lead vocals and harmonica on her debut single, "My Baby" (July 1965), and was backed by labelmates Tony Worsley and the Fabulous Blue Jays' band members Mal Clarke on guitar and Royce Nicholas on bass guitar. The track had been written by Clarke and Nicholas, while its B-side "No" was written by Nicholas and Kipner. Aulton produced the recording. McCann became a regular on teen-orientated television series, Saturday Date – she recorded its theme song, which was written by Kipner. According to The Australian Women's Weekly's writer, McCann "won many fans with her unusual, arresting voice, which her recording manager describes as 'just like a frog's'." "Saturday Date" was issued as the B-side of her second single, "If You Don't Come Back" (December 1965), which was produced by Kipner and released on Everybody's Records.

In 1966 McCann formed the duo, Toni and Royce, with Nicholas, which issued three singles moving form garage beat to folk pop sound; the pair relocated to United Kingdom before returning to Australia in 1971. The duo played the club and country circuit. By 1970 the couple were married. As Toni McRae, the singer issued her debut album, Banjo Flat, in 1975. In 1979 McCann and Nicholas undertook a tour of Queensland, performing The Dreamtime Show, an Australiana-based show, across Rockhampton, Darling Downs, Toowoomba and Central Queensland. Toni and Royce released three children's albums, The Dreamtime Show (1981), Wind in the Wattle (1982) and The One That Got Away... and Other Unlikely Tales (1987). Royce Nicholas died in September 2013, aged 70. McCann remarried and, as Sue Collier, she has worked as a prison chaplain since 2017.
