= Daysman =

Daysman may refer to:

- The Daysman, a book by Stanley Middleton
- Daysman, another word for Adjudicator
- Daysman, another name for day labourer

== See also ==
- Dayman (disambiguation)
