= Spin Records (Australian label) =

Australian record label

Spin Records was an Australian popular music label, active in the late 1960s and early 1970s.

== History ==
Spin Records was established in late 1966 by Clyde Packer, the elder son of publishing and broadcasting magnate Frank Packer, and the older brother of Kerry Packer. The label's first A&R manager was Nat Kipner (the father of musician-songwriter-producer Steve Kipner), who produced several early Spin releases. Most Spin recordings from the late 1960s and early 1970s were produced by Festival Records house producer Pat Aulton.

Launched in late 1965 with the single "Someday" by former Aztecs guitarist Tony Barber, the label was originally called Everybody's, which was also the name of the popular teen magazine published by the Packer family's Australian Consolidated Press. According to Australian historian Bill Casey, the overt cross-promotion reportedly met with resistance from commercial radio, so the label was re-badged as "Spin" after only four singles.

By January 1966, Everybody's had been re-launched as Spin Records and the parent company, Spin Records Production Pty Ltd, now included two new partners—NZ-born, Sydney-based entrepreneur Harry M. Miller, and Nat Kipner, who was originally hired retained as A&R manager, but later bought a financial interest in the label. After abortive negotiations with the Australian division of EMI Records, Spin Productions signed an exclusive ten-year distribution agreement with Festival Records and the first three Spin singles, released to coincide with the re-branding, were Ray Columbus' "We Want A Beat", Jeff St John & The Id's debut recording "Lindy Lou", and Marty Rhone's "Nature Boy".

Spin releases played an important part in Festival's business in that period, releasing successful albums and singles, including the 1969 hit single "Mr Guy Fawkes" by the Dave Miller Set, and the original Australian cast recording of the rock musical Hair, which became the first Australian cast recording to earn a Gold Record award. Through Kipner, Spin was also able to secure the lucrative Australian release rights to the Bee Gees' Polydor recordings from 1967 until the Spin label folded in 1973.

The early Spin releases were produced (or co-produced with Ossie Byrne) by Nat Kipner, or by noted producer-arranger Bill Shepherd, who accompanied the Bee Gees to the UK in 1967 as their musical director. From 1967, following the collapse of Ivan Dayman's Sunshine label, its acquisition by Festival, and his subsequent appointment as a Festival house producer, musician-composer-producer Pat Aulton took on a central role in Spin's productions, and he produced a large proportion of the label's output in the late '60s and early '70s.

In 1966, Spin played a pivotal role in the Bee Gees story, issuing the group's final batch of Australian singles, including their first major Australian hit, "Spicks and Specks", released in September that year. It was one of Spin's most successful singles, spending 19 weeks in the Sydney charts, where it peaked at #3. It went to #1 in other cities including Melbourne, and reached #1 on the newly established national Top 40 in Go-Set magazine, which also named it "Best Record of the Year".

The Bee Gees had originally signed to Festival's subsidiary Leedon Records, established by promoter Lee Gordon in the 1950s, and which Festival had acquired after Gordon's untimely death. According to Bee Gees historian Joseph Brennan, Festival was on the verge of dropping The Bee Gees from Leedon in late 1965, after eleven successive chart failures, although the band, and their manager and father Hugh Gibb, felt that much of the blame lay with Festival itself, and that the company had done little to promote their recordings. (It is notable that several other Australian performers had scored local hits with songs written by the Gibb brothers during the same period.) Hugh Gibb also questioned the legality of the boys' contract—they were all under 18 when they signed with Leedon—but Festival managing director Fred Marks negotiated a compromise, agreeing to release the trio from their Leedon contract on condition that they transfer to the Spin label. It was at that point that Nat Kipner briefly took over from Hugh Gibb as the Bee gees' manager, until they moved back to the UK at the start of 1967, when they signed a new management contract with Robert Stigwood and the NEMS organisation.

Once signed to Spin, Nat Kipner's support and guidance proved invaluable to The Bee Gees' career, as did the production skills and support of independent producer and studio owner Ossie Byrne. Over several months during mid-1966, Byrne gave the Gibb brothers virtually unlimited time in his St Clair Studio in Hurstville, Sydney and the Gibbs have acknowledged that Byrne's generosity and guidance were crucial in enabling them to find their feet as studio artists.

Despite Festival's earlier misgivings, the deal proved lucrative for both Spin and Festival. After they arrived in Britain, The Bee Gees signed with Stigwood's RSO Records (distributed by Polydor) for the UK, and Atlantic Records in the US, but Spin (and therefore Festival) retained the exclusive rights to distribute The Bee Gees' recordings in Australia for the better part of a decade. The first Bee Gees single released under that arrangement was their international breakthrough hit "New York Mining Disaster 1941" (1967).

Spin released some of the best local and international singles of the late Sixties, including all of The Bee Gees late '60s UK recordings. Artists on the Spin roster included former Aztecs guitarist Tony Barber, Steve & The Board (led by Nat Kipner's son and future hit songwriter Steve Kipner), Ronnie Burns, Toni McCann, Ray Columbus, Jeff St John, Marty Rhone, Tony Summers, Chris Hall & The Torquays, The Sunsets (later renamed Tamam Shud), The Ram Jam Big Band, Janice Slater, The Dave Miller Set, and expatriate Hungarian fusion group Syrius, which featured legendary Australian jazz-funk bassist Jackie Orczarsky. Harry M. Miller's interest in the label also led to Spin releasing the highly-successful Australian cast recording of Hair in 1970, the first Australian stage cast recording LP to be awarded a Gold Record.

The label was very productive, releasing 116 singles, 35 EPs and 38 LPs over the eight years between May 1966 and May 1974. Spin typically released 2-3 singles per month during its peak years. All Spin recordings were manufactured and distributed by Festival Records. Up to 1973, all singles distributed by Festival were catalogued in a consecutive four-figure series, with the different labels identified by prefixes. Festival's own releases (and some of the overseas recordings it released under license) were identified with a "FK" prefix (e.g. FK-1340). Spin singles were identified by the prefix "EK", an artefact of its original incarnation as "Everybody's". The final Spin single release, one of only two in Festaival's new "K" series (1973–74), was the Bee Gees' "Mr Natural".

Spin's EP and LP releases were similarly catalogued; Festival catalogued all EPs in its consecutive '11000' series, prefixed with a two-letter ID prefix (Spin's was "EX"). Spin LPs were initially catalogued in Festival's '30000' series and identified with an "EL" prefix". That series changed to Festival's '930000' series ca. 1967. Early Spin LPs were released in mono; Jeff St John & The Id's Big Time Operators (1967) was Spin's first stereo LP, and one of the first stereo pop music albums by an Australian group. The original Australian cast recording of The Boy Friend (Sep. 1968) was the last Spin LP to be released in mono. Spin's last two LPs—The Bee Gees' compilation Double Gold, and Mr Natural (1974) were issued under Festival's new L series catalogue.

Spin Productions went into liquidation in mid-1974 and the company's catalogue was subsequently purchased by Festival. The Spin name was revived briefly in 2000 for what was planned as an extensive series of commemorative CDs that were to have been issued to mark the company's 50th anniversary, but the project was cancelled after only a few releases, due to cost-cutting and restructures. Despite those measures, Festival Mushroom went into liquidation in mid-2005 and its entire recording archive—including the Spin catalogue—was sold to the Australian division of Warner Music in October 2005, for a reported AU$10 million.
