= The Go!! Show =

1964–1967 Australian music TV series

- Genre: Music television
- Directed by: Godfrey Phillips
- Creative director: Bruce Rowland
- Presented by: Alan Field; Ian Turpie; Johnny Young
- Composer: The Strangers
- Country of origin: Australia
- Original language: English
- No. of seasons: 3
- No. of episodes: 222

Production
- Producers: Dennis Smith; Godfrey Phillips; Julian Jover
- Production location: Nunawading, Victoria
- Running time: 55 min (1964–66); 25 min (1967)
- Production companies: Willard-King Productions; DYT Productions

Original release
- Network: ATV; Network Ten
- Release: August 1964 – August 1967

The Go!! Show (also known simply as Go!!) is an Australian popular music television series which was produced before a live audience and aired on Network Ten ATV-0, Melbourne, from August 1964 to August 1967, running one hour three nights a week.

It was produced by Willard-King Productions, DYT Productions. Over its run it was hosted, in turn, by Alan Field (1964), Ian Turpie (1964–66) and Johnny Young (1966–67) and Ronnie Burns

The series was known for having a regular roster of performers including The Strangers, a line of go-go dancers who appeared from week to week, Olivia Newton-John and Pat Carroll, Lynne Randell, Normie Rowe and The Twilights.

== History ==
When the Melbourne-based Go Show!! premiered in August 1964, the other major competing television popular music show series Bandstand, was made by the Nine Network in Sydney. While that series had been an important outlet for the first wave of Australian rock'n'roll, it did not engage strongly with the so-called "Beat Boom" acts which emerged in the mid-1960s and onwards; Bandstand subsequently settled into a more mainstream musical variety format aimed at a broad general audience.

Unusually, the main competition for Go!! was broadcast on the same station: in December 1965, ATV-0 commissioned a second pop show, Kommotion, produced by the Willard-King organisation and hosted by popular Melbourne radio and TV personality Ken Sparkes. It was broadcast with five episodes each week day.

The Go!! Show focussed on the more sophisticated youth market and tended to concentrate on local solo performers, while Kommotion (which was in part modelled on the American series Shindig!) pursued a more group- and chart-oriented format, as well as featuring a troupe of go-go dancers and a regular team of young performers who mimed to the latest overseas hits.

== Production ==
The Go!! Show was made by DYT Productions, a production company founded and run by Australian musician Horrie Dargie with partners Arthur Young and Johnny Tillbrook, with producers Dennis Smith, Godfrey Phillips and Julian Jover working on Go!! specifically. It premiered in August 1964, just after the Beatles' Australian tour and just days after ATV-0's official opening. It was videotaped before a live audience, with early episodes being one hour long, screened three nights per week. In its third season, broadcast 1966–67, it was shortened to thirty minutes. Because national television networking was only just being established in Australia, The Go!! Show was only seen in Victoria for its first two years.

== Presenters ==
There were three hosts of Go!! during its run: the first was North-English comedian Alan Field, who had compered the July 1964 Beatles tour. Singer-actor Ian Turpie took over from Field from episode 26 until August 1966 when Turpie quit, stating that pursuing a career as an adult entertainer forced him to resign. Pop star and future Young Talent Time host Johnny Young took over.

In an incident in December 1966, Young arrived at the ATV studio complaining of feeling "tired and hot". During taping of an episode, he began "fumbling and making silly mistakes", reportedly forgot the name of the artist he was meant to introduce, and subsequently collapsed on camera. The incident was attributed to Young's hectic schedule.

== Performers ==
The Go!! Show almost exclusively featured local performers and concentrated on solo singers, who were typically backed by the show's house band The Strangers. It featured many of the major Australian pop stars of the time, including DYT-managed singer April Byron, resident female singer of the first season, Bobby & Laurie, The Spinning Wheels, Lynne Randell, Johnny Devlin, Colin Cook, The Twilights, Mike Furber and Normie Rowe. Olivia Newton-John and Pat Carroll were regulars, with Newton-John making at least sixteen appearances between February 1965 and December 1966. Singer and composer Buddy England auditioned for the premiere episode and became a regular performer for the entire run of the series.

The Strangers performed their own material on weekly basis throughout the life of the show. They notably secured one of the first sponsorship deals in Australian pop and were provided with a set of distinctive "El Toro" model electric guitars and basses made by the noted Melbourne-based luthier Maton. Strangers singer-guitarist John Farrar became a prominent session arranger in the late 1960s before moving overseas and achieving great international success in the 1970s and beyond as a producer for Olivia Newton-John. He also wrote two songs for the soundtrack of the film version of the Broadway musical Grease, which became the biggest hits of the movie.

== Record label ==
Coinciding with the premiere of the TV series, production team DYT launched their own record label, Go!! Records, and The Go!! Show frequently cross-promoted acts signed to the label. Unconnected pop magazine Go-Set (1966–1974) which coincidentally shared the "Go" brand and market formed a marketing triumvirate.

Although it was extremely popular, attracting as many as 400,000 viewers each week, The Go!! Show was cancelled suddenly in August 1967 after more than 200 episodes, at virtually the same time as the axing of Kommotion. According to Kommotion host Ken Sparkes, the main cause was the imposition of an Actors Equity ban on miming in TV programs, which effectively put both shows out of business.

Like most pop shows of the time, it was customary for performers to mime to a recording of their latest hit; Kommotion typically used commercial recordings of current hits, whereas Go!! (like the BBC's Top of the Pops) often used pre-taped tracks specially recorded for the show. With the cancellation of the series the Go!! label soon folded since its main means of promotion had been removed.

The network replaced the cancelled shows with a new Saturday morning pop show, Uptight, which was nationally networked; it ran until the end of 1969 when it was 'rebranded' as Happening '70 (followed by Happening '71 and '72).

== Surviving episodes ==
Like most other Australian TV shows from this period, there is very little surviving archival material from The Go!! Show. Most of the more than 200 episodes were subsequently destroyed when the network archives ran out of storage space, although numerous fragments and several entire programs have survived. The exact amount of remaining footage is uncertain, but at least seven episodes from late 1966 are known to have survived in their entirety. This material was copied from tapes in the archive sometime in the late 1990s and circulated widely among collectors over the next few years; some clips have since made their way onto YouTube.

== See also ==
- List of Australian music television shows
