= Phil Garland =

New Zealand folk musician (1942–2017)

Phil Garland QSM
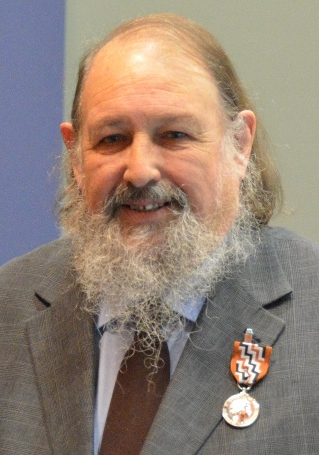
- Garland in 2014

Background information
- Born: Philip Humphrey Garland; 9 February 1942; Christchurch, New Zealand
- Died: 15 March 2017 (aged 75) Hamilton, New Zealand
- Genre: Folk

Philip Humphrey Garland QSM (9 February 1942 – 15 March 2017) was a New Zealand folk musician. He was awarded the Queen's Service Medal in the 2014 Queen's Birthday Honours for services to folk music, and was called the "Godfather of New Zealand folk music". He recorded 19 albums, and won the New Zealand Music Awards folk album of the year three times.

Garland died in Hamilton on 15 March 2017, aged 75, and was buried in the Rutherford Street (Woolston) Cemetery, Christchurch.

== Discography ==
- A Sense of Place
- Billycan Ballads
- Colonial Yesterdays
- Damper, Duff & Doughboys
- Down A Country Road
- How Are You, Mate?
- Hunger in the Air
- No Place Like Home
- One Hundred Years Ago
- Southern Odyssey
- Springtime in the Mountain
- Swag o' Dreams
- Under The Southern Cross
- Wind in the Tussock
- The Phil Garland Songbook

== Books ==
- Faces in the Firelight
