= Marlene Dayman =

Australian swimmer (born 1949)

Personal information
- Born: 14 October 1949 (age 76) Adelaide, South Australia, Australia

Sport
- Sport: Swimming
- Strokes: backstroke

Marlene Dayman (born 14 October 1949) is an Australian former swimmer. She competed in the women's 100 metre backstroke at the 1964 Summer Olympics. Earlier she had defied an instruction from the Australian Swimming Union not to march in the opening ceremony.

In March 1965 the union banned Dayman for three years and three fellow swimmers, Nan Duncan (three years), Dawn Fraser (ten years) and Linda McGill (four years), from swimming for defying their instruction. This effectively ended her swimming career. Dayman is the daughter of music promoter, talent manager and record label owner, Ivan Dayman.
