= Dayman Island =

- Location of Dayman Island in British Columbia
- Coordinates: 48°58′20″N 123°41′15″W
- Country: Canada
- Province: British Columbia

Dayman Island is a privately owned island located off the coast of British Columbia, Canada, beside Thetis Island and Hudson Island. It is about 24 acres (9.7 ha) in size, and has a 2,100-square-foot (200 m^{2}) year-round main residence and a caretaker's residence.

Likely named after Dayman, an officer aboard HMS Thetis, 36-guns, on this station 1851–1853, under the command of Captain Augustus Kuper, CB. As Kuper Island was named in 1858 by Captain Richards, HMS Plumper, Dayman Island was possibly named at the same time, although not labeled on resulting Admiralty Chart 579. Psychedelic pioneer and government agent Al Hubbard owned the island from at least the 1950s until 1968.

- Gazetteer Map: 92B/13
- Relative Location: E side of Stuart Channel, W of S end Thetis Island, Cowichan Land District.
