= Normie Rowe =

Australian rock and roll singer (born 1947)

Normie Rowe AM
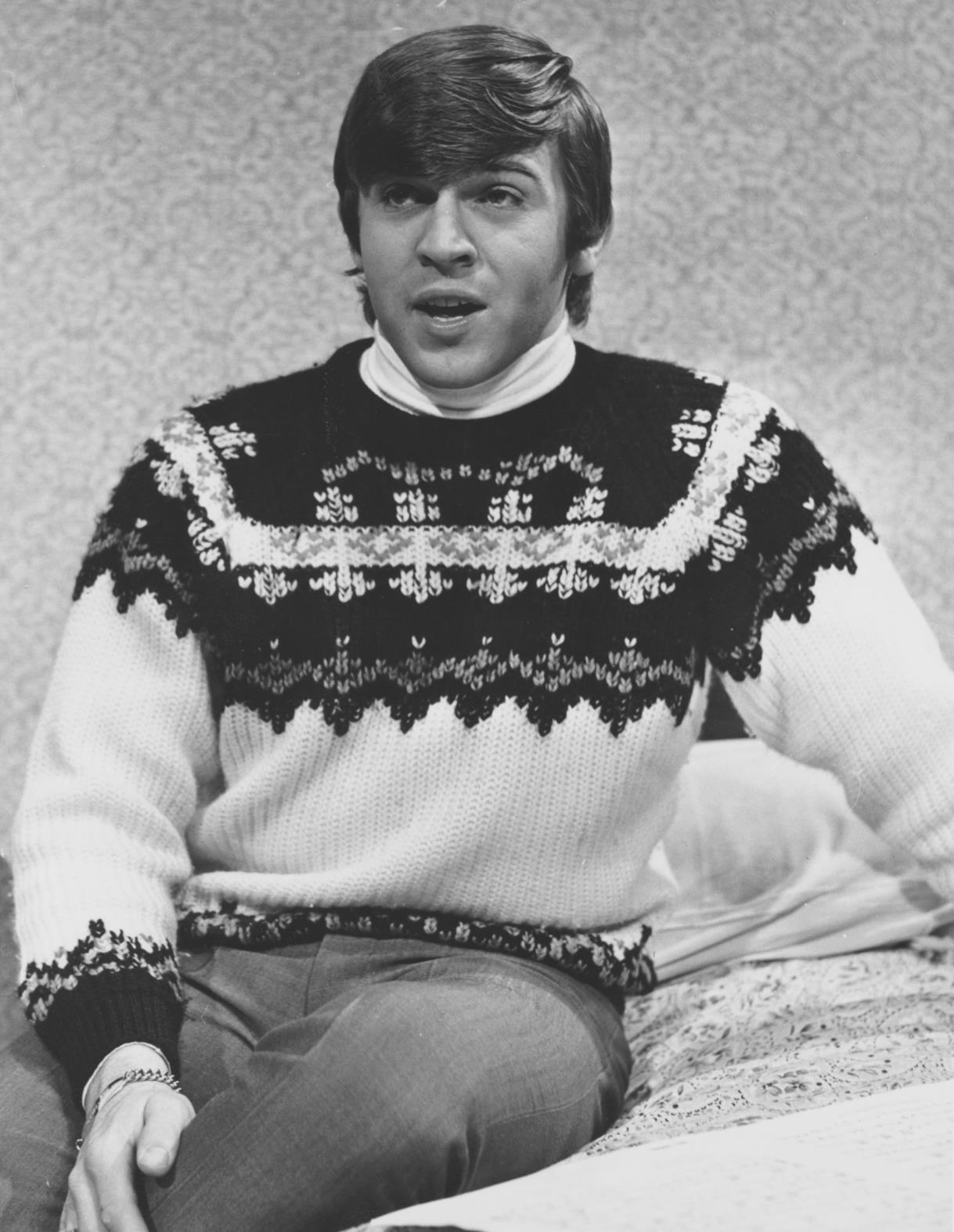
- Rowe in 1965

Background information
- Born: Norman John Rowe; 1 February 1947 (age 79); Melbourne, Victoria, Australia
- Genre: Rock and roll
- Occupations: Singer; songwriter; theatre performer; soldier
- Years active: 1960s–2006
- Labels: Festival, Astor, Sunshine
- Military career
- Allegiance: Australia
- Branch: Australian Army
- Service years: February 1968 – May 1970
- Rank: Corporal
- Conflicts: Vietnam War

Norman John Rowe AM (born 1 February 1947) is an Australian singer, songwriter and actor. He rose to national prominence in the mid-1960s as a pop star and teen idol, backed by the Playboys. His 1965 double A-side "Que Sera Sera"/"Shakin' All Over" was one of the most successful Australian singles of the decade.

Born in Melbourne, Rowe was inspired by rock and roll as a teenager and began performing while still in high school, leaving his job to become a professional entertainer. He was signed by local label Sunshine, where he released his biggest hits; he was credited with his bright and edgy tenor voice and dynamic stage presence. Rowe was named "King Of Pop" by Go-Set in 1967 and 1968. Many of his most successful recordings were produced by Nat Kipner and later by Pat Aulton, house producers for the Sunshine label. His string of consecutive top ten singles in the mid-1960s made him the most popular solo performer of the era, although attempts to break into the United Kingdom were unsuccessful.

Rowe was drafted for National Service in late 1967. His subsequent tour of duty in Vietnam, which lasted from 1968 to 1970, effectively ended his pop career, and his reputation was affected by the anti–Vietnam War movement and the stigma around returning soldiers. Unable to recapture the musical success he had enjoyed at his peak in the 1960s, he pursued a career in theatre and television, including a role on Seven Network soap opera Sons and Daughters. In 1991, he was involved in a physical fight on live television with broadcaster Ron Casey after the latter made derogatory remarks regarding Rowe's service in Vietnam.

In October 1979 Rowe's first child, Adam, died in an accident, and later his daughter, Erin, died just before Christmas in December 2022.

== Biography ==
=== Early life: 1947–1964 ===
Rowe was born and raised in Northcote in Melbourne, Victoria, Australia. He was drawn to music early in life, and began singing with his local church choir in Melbourne while at primary school. He was hooked on rock and roll music even before his teens, and Col Joye became one of his early idols and inspirations. He took up guitar and formed his first amateur band, The Valiants, whilst attending Northcote High School. The band performed once a month at Alphington Methodist Hall. He concentrated on singing and made his first stage appearance as a lead vocalist in a school concert, aged 14.

When I was just aspiring to be a singer, only nine years of age, Col Joye was my idol. He was the boy next door that I could identify with, not the wild Johnny O'Keefe. In fact it was as my first concert, at the Lou Toppano Music School end of the year concert in 1959 or '60, that I sang Col's "Rock 'n' Rollin' Clementine". I still have the trophy I received for that show. It reads: "The Best Performance of the Night".

— Norman Rowe

By luck, the show was compered by top Melbourne radio DJ Stan Rofe. Rofe was impressed by Rowe's talent and arranged for him to work with local dance promoter Kevin McClellan. He began performing regularly at Melbourne dances and discos, backed by instrumental groups like The Thunderbirds, The Impostors and, finally, The Playboys, who became his permanent band until 1967.

After leaving high school at the end of 1962, Rowe joined the Postmaster-General's Department (PMG) on 14 January 1963. He worked as a trainee technician but, in late 1964, his long hair became an issue with his employers and, in the face of a "cut it or quit" ultimatum, he left the PMG to become a professional entertainer. Working on the Melbourne dance circuit, he became a popular attraction and it was not long before he was picked to become a regular on Melbourne pop TV shows like Teen Scene and The Go!! Show. According to music historian Ed Nimmervoll, EMI had the chance to sign him but turned him down, claiming that he could not sing. He was signed to a recording deal with the independent label, Sunshine, which included a management deal with the Ivan Dayman organisation.

== Music career ==
=== Sixties stardom ===
Rowe's first single, released in April 1965, was a brooding "beat" arrangement of George Gershwin's "It Ain't Necessarily So" (from Porgy & Bess) a choice suggested by Stan Rofe. It was a Number 1 hit in Melbourne and a Top Ten hit in most other capitals cities (No. 6 in Sydney, No. 5 in Adelaide, No. 3 in Brisbane), even though Sydney pop station 2SM, then owned by the Catholic Church, banned it because of its supposedly sacrilegious lyrics. The inspiration for Rowe's version was apparently a 1963 version by the United Kingdom band Ian and the Zodiacs. Some references cite the source as a version by the Merseybeats, but that band never recorded "It Ain't Necessarily So". The name of the Ian and the Zodiacs' album, This Is Merseybeat, has apparently been confused with the name of the band The Merseybeats.

Rowe's first LP was released in July 1965. His second single, apparently discovered while trawling through Rofe's vast record collection, released in August, was a cover of Ben E. King's "I (Who Have Nothing)". It became his second Top 10 hit (No. 10 in Sydney, No. 6 in Adelaide, No. 4 in Melbourne) (and a Number 23 in Brisbane).

Although Rowe's third single, "I Confess" / "Everything's Alright", was apparently withdrawn before or soon after release, the next single became the biggest hit of his career. The A-side was a cover of "Que Sera Sera" (best known from the Doris Day original), which was given a "Merseybeat" treatment, in the manner of The Beatles' "Twist & Shout". Paired with a powerful version of the Johnny Kidd & The Pirates classic "Shakin' All Over", the single became a double-sided No. 1 hit in most capitals (#1 Sydney, #1 Melbourne, #1 Brisbane, #1 Adelaide) in September, charting for 28 weeks and selling in unprecedented numbers—rock historian Ian McFarlane reports sales of 80,000 copies while 1970s encyclopedist Noel McGrath claimed sales of 100,000, and it is reputed to be the biggest-selling Australian single of the 1960s. Rowe scored another first in October by having three hit singles in the Melbourne Top 40 simultaneously.

An oft-repeated story that the whistle used in the arrangement was an innovation by the record's producer appears to be unfounded, because very similar arrangements, complete with whistle, had been recorded on earlier versions by Earl Royce & The Olympics (UK, 1964) and by The High Keys (USA, 1963).

Rowe's success continued through late 1965 and into the first half of 1966, during which time he scored another three consecutive Top Ten singles. "Tell Him I'm Not Home" (November 1965), a cover of a song originally recorded by Chuck Jackson in 1963, was a Top 5 hit in most mainland capitals, reaching #4 in Sydney, #2 in Melbourne, #2 in Adelaide and #1 in Melbourne It was followed by his version of Burt Bacharach and Hal David's "The Breaking Point" (b/w "Ya Ya", Feb. 1966) which became his second double-sided hit, a number #1 in Brisbane and making the Top Ten in all mainland capitals, peaking at #9 in Adelaide, #8 in Sydney, #2 in Melbourne and Perth, #1 in Brisbane.

"Pride & Joy" (June 1966) was also Top Ten in most state capitals. That single is also notable for its B-side, a cover of "The Stones That I Throw", written by Robbie Robertson, originally recorded in 1965 by Levon & the Hawks, later known as The Band. He appeared in the 1966 musical comedy film Don't Let It Get You. In the mid-year, he joined The Easybeats, Bobby & Laurie and MPD Ltd on "The Big Four" national tour that played to huge crowds around the country.

=== United Kingdom: 1966–1968 ===
Rowe was by this time the most popular solo performer in Australia so, in August 1966, he left to try his luck in the UK. In preparation, he revamped the line-up of his backing band, the Playboys. Several members opted to stay in Australia for family reasons, so Rowe replaced them with bassist Brian Peacock and guitarist Rod Stone, both from the ex-New Zealand band The Librettos, which had recently split.

Arriving in London ahead of his band, Rowe engaged Ritchie Yorke as his London agent and began to record with producers Trevor Kennedy and John Carter, using the cream of London's session musicians, including Big Jim Sullivan, Jimmy Page, John Paul Jones, famed drummer Clem Cattini, and vocal group The Breakaways. The sessions produced several strong new recordings, including "Ooh La La", "It's Not Easy", "Mary Mary", "Turn on the Love Light" and "Can't Do Without Your Love". Despite his absence in London, Rowe's run of chart success in Australia continued. His next single, "Ooh La La" / "Ain't Nobody Home" (November 1966) was another double-sided hit in Melbourne and a Top 5 hit in most capitals, reaching #2 in Sydney, and #4 in Brisbane and Adelaide.

Up to that time, there was no national pop chart in Australia, with most pop radio stations and newspapers in state capitals and major cities publishing their own competing charts. However, on 5 October 1966, Go-Set magazine, which had been launched in February, began publishing a weekly national Top 40, compiled by Ed Nimmervoll. "Ooh La La" / "Mary, Mary" debuted at #6 on the new Go-Set chart on 7 December 1966, and reached #1 in the 21 December chart, hence becoming Rowe's first official national #1 hit. It stayed at #1 for two weeks before being briefly supplanted by The Easybeats' "Friday on My Mind" on 4 January, but returned to the top for the next two weeks.

While "Ooh La La" was at #1 in Australia, Rowe's next single, the ballad "It's Not Easy" was also climbing the chart. It debuted at #17 in the Go-Set chart in the last week of December 1966, and reached the Top 10 in the second week of January. Through the end of January and into February, Rowe achieved a first for an Australian popular recording artist by having two of the top three singles simultaneously for three consecutive weeks. Rowe worked in England for ten months and toured with acts including Julie Driscoll, Brian Auger & The Trinity, The Spencer Davis Group, Kiki Dee, Gene Pitney and The Troggs. High hopes were held for a British breakthrough and, in the early months of 1967, the pages of Go-Set featured predictions of his imminent UK stardom, though that never materialised.

The new Playboys lineup arrived in London in December, but Rowe flew home for Christmas, which coincided with the release of "It's Not Easy" / "Mary Mary". He returned to England in January and, in March 1967, the group embarked on a tour of the UK, supporting The Troggs, Gene Pitney and Sounds Incorporated. That same month, Phil Blackmore left the group for family reasons and returned to Australia, being replaced by English organist Trevor Griffin. Rod Stone left in mid-1967 and returned to Australia, after which he joined band The Groove. He was replaced by former Adam Faith sideman Mick Rogers. At the end of 1966, Rowe was voted Australia's best male singer in the inaugural Go-Set Pop Poll.

Meanwhile, The Playboys secured a one-off single deal with Andrew Loog Oldham's Immediate Records label, releasing the single "Sad" / "Black Sheep RIP" in August. Written by Brian Peacock, "Sad" is now considered a 'freakbeat' classic and has been widely anthologised, appearing on the British collection Chocolate Soup For Diabetics Vol III, Raven Records' Kicks and Rhino's Nuggets II. In June, Normie Rowe and the Playboys travelled to North America, supporting Roy Orbison on a US tour and, along with The Seekers, he represented Australia in performance at Expo '67 in Montreal. He returned to Australia in July, where he appeared as a special guest at the national finals of the 1967 Hoadley's Battle of the Sounds.

Rowe had more national chart success in late 1967 with the Graham Gouldman song "Going Home" (b/w "I Don't Care"), assumed to be about the Vietnam War, but really about a migrant's return to Australia from Britain, which debuted at #22 in the Go-Set chart in late April and stayed in the national Top Ten until the end of May, peaking at #7 in the second week of May. "Sunshine Secret" / "But I Know", and another single, "Turn Down Day" charted in Melbourne. However, in September 1967, any questions about his career future were dramatically stalled when he received his call-up notice for national service.

=== National Service: 1968–1970 ===
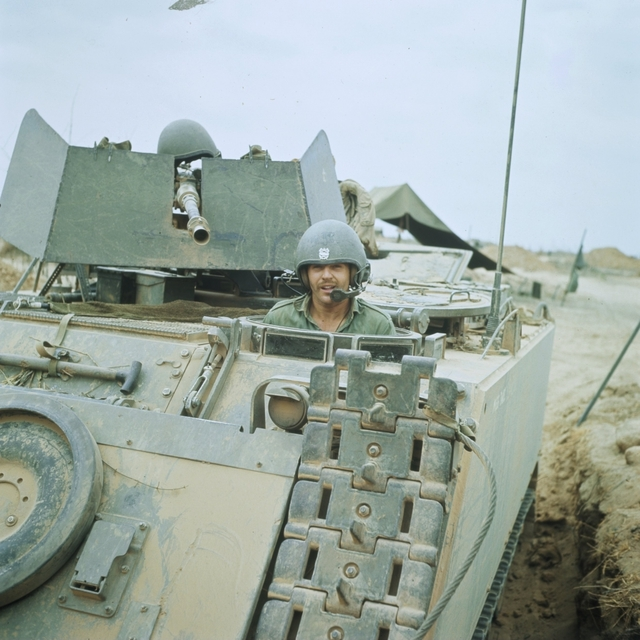
Normie Rowe in an M113 armoured personnel carrier in South Vietnam

Rowe was inducted into the army in February 1968, although he continued to perform part-time until leaving for Vietnam in January 1969, making various television appearances. On 19 October 1968, he appeared on ATV-0's Uptight with a cropped haircut. He also began working with a new backing band, Nature's Own, who also regularly backed Johnny Farnham and other members of the Sunshine roster. His only charting record during that period was the ballad "Penelope", written by former Playboys member Brian Peacock.

Rowe's basic training at Puckapunyal army camp was extensively covered by the Australian media. In Vietnam, Rowe rose to the rank of corporal and was crew commander of an armoured personnel carrier. He was discharged from the army in February 1970. Rowe's final minor hit was "Hello", written by Johnny Young, released in May 1970, and he subsequently released an album of the same name. Rowe was later revealed to have inspired the song "Smiley", written by Johnny Young and recorded by Ronnie Burns, which was a major hit in Australia in 1969 and 1970. The Hello album marked the end of Rowe's Sunshine contract, although the label had been taken over by Festival several years earlier after it had run into financial problems. Rowe signed to Festival Records in 1971, and cut three singles. "Que Sera Sera" was re-released in January 1971 and, on 6 March, he married his girlfriend, Sue Powlesland.

Rowe's pop music career was effectively ended by his time in Vietnam and, in his absence, Ronnie Burns and John Farnham (then billed as Johnny Farnham) replaced him as King of Pop. The strong anti-war sentiment of the period affected him, and like many Vietnam vets, Rowe suffered considerably because of his service. He said that he was treated like a pariah by the very people who had been buying his records and screaming at his concerts only a couple of years before. One of the people he remembers fondly from that period, who stuck by him and gave him encouragement in tough times, was Meteors drummer Stewie Speer. Rowe remembers that Speer would often wear "King Normie" and "We Love Normie" badges on his jacket.

=== Variety ===
Although his pop career was effectively over, Rowe was able to fall back on the training from his dance hall days, and began to concentrate on a varied career playing the club and hotel circuit, as well as making TV performances. He became a popular participant on variety programs such as The Don Lane Show and The Mike Walsh Show. Continuing to record through the 1970s, 1980s and 1990s, he switched to Astor Records in 1975, and had considerable success with the single "Elizabeth", which won the "Best Song" category at that year's Tokyo Music Festival.

== Theatre and television ==
In the 1980s, Rowe began to expand his career into acting and musical theatre. He studied at the Sydney's famous Ensemble Theatre and took roles on stage and TV, including an extended role in the TV soapie Sons & Daughters. In 1987, he won great acclaim in his central role of Jean Valjean in Cameron Mackintosh's Sydney production of the musical Les Misérables.

Among other musical roles in the 1980s and 1990s, Rowe played the lead role in the world premiere concerts and on the associated recording, and of a new Australian musical, Cyrano de Bergerac, which he helped develop. He played Daddy Warbucks in Annie, Freddie Trumper (the American) in Chess, and Juan Perón in Evita. One of the highlights of his career was his appointment as a Member of the Order of Australia (AM) for services to Vietnam veterans, the entertainment industry and the community. Rowe has had a long association with many charity and community groups, his major concern being the welfare of children. He is a long-serving member of Variety Clubs of Australia, for which he became a National Ambassador, and he won several awards for his work with them, including 1996's "Heart and Soul of Variety" award.

In the 1990s, Rowe remained a popular attraction at clubs, corporate functions and on the rock-&-roll revival circuit. He also kept up regular appearances on TV variety shows, which led to one infamous incident in 1991 that briefly took him back into the headlines. During a forum on republicanism on the Midday show with Ray Martin, he was involved in an on-air melée with Sydney journalist and talkback-radio host Ron Casey. Notorious for his highly controversial comments on immigration and other issues, Casey enraged Rowe with remarks about his service in Vietnam, which led to Rowe shoving him. Casey jumped out of his chair and punched Rowe hard enough to knock him backwards. In 1998, Casey and Rowe re-united, filming a TV commercial for Bushells tea in which the Midday incident was reflected upon.

=== Personal life ===
Rowe has also had to endure other public hardships, including family problems involving his teenage daughter, which resulted in a great deal of intrusive and unwelcome publicity, and the end of his marriage to his first wife, Sue. In October 1979, Normie's son, Adam John Rowe, died after being accidentally knocked down by a motorist while he was riding his bicycle home from his school fete when he was eight years old. In 2023 he married Samantha Gowing.

== 2002–current ==
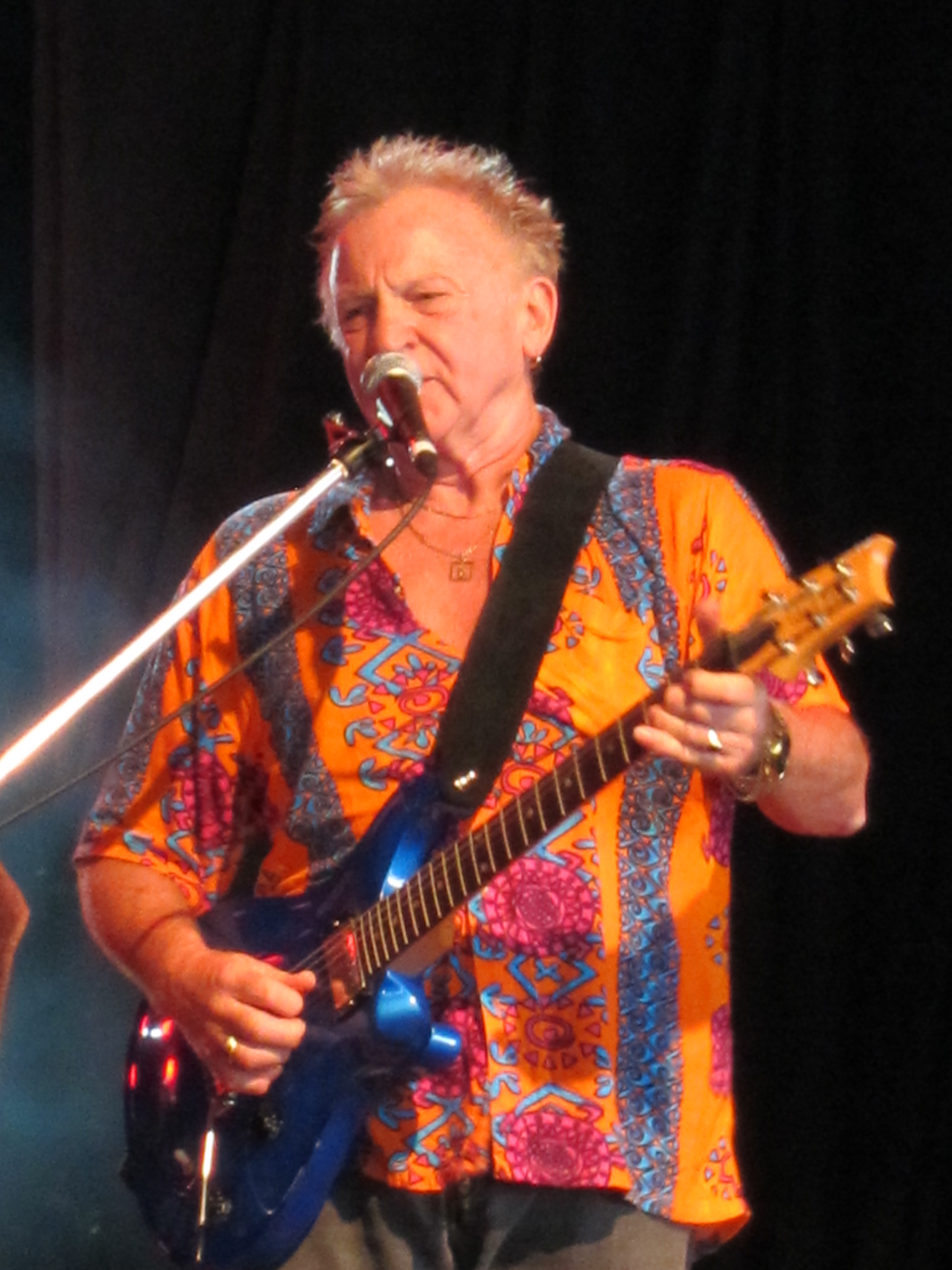
Rowe performing in 2011.

In 2002, Rowe received national acclaim for his performance in the Long Way to the Top concert tour, Rowe's 2007 album, Missing in Action, included his own version of Ronnie Burns hit "Smiley".

Rowe portrayed former Prime Minister, Harold Holt, in the telemovie The Prime Minister is Missing, broadcast on ABC TV on 23 October 2008.

In 2009, as part of an installation art titled Enshrining the Vestiges – Speaking Stones, Rowe participated in a video interview that is on display in "The Shrine of Memories World War II memorial" in ANZAC Square, Brisbane. by artist Natalie Billing. In October 2010, Rowe's 1965 album, Ain't Necessarily So, was listed in the book, 100 Best Australian Albums.

Rowe was one of the lead acts in the Go Show reunion concerts held in Melbourne and Adelaide during February 2011.

In 2011, Rowe was a guest on episode 115 of SBS program RocKwiz, on which he performed Shakin' All Over, and a duet with Georgia Fields of The Beatles song All I've Got to Do.

In January 2012, Rowe appeared in a television advertisement for Coles Supermarkets promoting their products to the reworked tune of "Shakin' All Over".

In 2015, he told Noise11.com that he was drafted as a political move to help the popularity of Harold Holt, the Australian Prime Minister. Apparently, Rowe was contacted by the son of a military officer who had been, at that time, the military attaché to the prime minister. Just before he died, the officer told his son that he had been in Holt's office when the PM was struggling with declining popularity and the anti-war movement. The officer had advised Holt: "What you need is an Elvis Presley, so get Normie Rowe called up".

In June 2017, Rowe wrapped the shooting of a short film entitled Holt, in which he played the titular Harold Holt for the third time. Filming took place around Brisbane and the Sunshine Coast.

== Charity ==
In 2009, Rowe became a Patron of Kidney Health Australia, the not-for-profit peak body promoting good kidney health through education, advocacy, research and support.

== Discography ==
=== Albums ===
- 1965 – It Ain't Necessarily So, But It Is Normie Rowe (Sunshine released July 1965 QL 31734/Calendar re-release late 1965 R 66–73)
- 1965 – Normie Rowe a Go Go (Sunshine QL 31802)
- 1965 – A Wonderful Feeling (Sunshine QL 31871/Calendar R66-335)
- 1966 – Normie's Hit Happenings (Sunshine QL 32198/Calendar R66-553)
- 1966 – So Much Love From Normie Rowe (Sunshine QL 32144)
- 1968 – Everything's Alright (Universal UP 768) (Compilation of Rowe's first two LPs)
- 1969 – Normie's Top Tunes (Universal)
- 1973 – Hello (Sunshine L 25093)
- 1974 – Out of the Norm
- 1970 – Normie Rowe's Greatest Hits (Harlequin L 25138)
- 2007 – Missing in Action
- 1974 – Come Hear My Song (Summit SRA 250152)
- 1975 – Normie's Hit Tunes (Summit SRA 249 9020)
- 2000 – The Early Anthology (Festival D46111) Double CD

=== EPs ===
| Year | Month | Title | Catalogue |
|---|---|---|---|
| 1965 | October | It Ain't Necessarily Rowe | Sunshine QX 11056 |
| 1965 | | Normie Rowe Sings "I" | Sunshine QX 11068 |
| 1965 | | Que Sera Sera | Sunshine QX 11110 |
| 1965 | November | Shakin' All Over | Sunshine QX 11131 |
| 1966 | | Tell Him I'm Not Home | Sunshine QX 11138 |
| 1966 | | Call on Me | Sunshine QX 11139 |
| 1966 | | Pride & Joy | Sunshine QX 11182 |
| 1966 | | The Stones That I Throw | Sunshine QX 11187 |
| 1967 | February | Ooh La La! It's Not Easy | Sunshine QX 11250 |
| 1967 | July | Going Home | Sunshine QX 11277 |
| 1967 | August | Normie's New Four | Sunshine QX 11295 |
| 1967 | November | Turn Down Day | Sunshine QX 11406 |
| 1968 | | Penelope | Sunshine QX 11488 |

=== Singles ===
| Release date | Single | B-Side | Catalogue | Chart Position |
|---|---|---|---|---|
| April 1965 | "It Ain't Necessarily So" | "Gonna Leave This Town" | Sunshine QK 951 | AUS #5 |
| June 1965 | "I (Who Have Nothing)" | "I Just Don't Understand" | Sunshine QK 1069 | AUS #9 |
| September 1965 | "I Confess" | "Everything's Alright" | Sunshine QK 1075 | (withdrawn from sale) |
| September 1965 | "Que Sera Sera" | "Shakin' All Over" | Sunshine QK 1103 | AUS #1 (Double A-Side) |
| November 1965 | "Tell Him I'm Not Home" | "Call on Me" | Sunshine QK 1158 | AUS #3 (Double A-Side) |
| March 1966 | "The Breaking Point" | "Ya Ya" | Sunshine QK 1238 | AUS #5 (Double A-Side) |
| June 1966 | "Pride & Joy" | "The Stones That I Throw" | Sunshine QK 1344 | AUS #8 (Double A-Side) |
| November 1966 | "Ooh La La" | "Ain't Nobody Home" | Sunshine QIK-1565 | AUS #1 (Double A-Side) |
| December 1966 | "It's Not Easy" | "Mary Mary" | Sunshine QK 1605 | AUS #3 |
| April 1967 | "Going Home" | "I Don't Care" | Sunshine QK 1731 | AUS #11 (Double A-Side) |
| 1967 | "I Live in the Sunshine" | "Far Beyond the Call of Duty" | Sunshine QK 1817 | – |
| June 1967 | "Sunshine Secret" | "But I Know" | Sunshine QK 1820 | AUS #17 (Double A-Side) |
| October 1967 | "Turn Down Day" | "Stop to Think It Over" | Sunshine QK 2008 | AUS #46 (Double A-Side) |
| May 1968 | "Penelope" | "Lucinda" | Sunshine QK 2238 | AUS #30 |
| August 1968 | "Break Out" | "Born to Be By Your Side" | Sunshine QK 2493 | AUS #41 (Double A-Side) |
| October 1968 | "Walking on New Grass" | "Open Up the Skies" | Sunshine QK 2596 | – |
| March 1969 | "Just to Satisfy You" | "Drinkin Wine Spo-Dee-O-Dee" | Sunshine QK 2819 | – |
| June 1969 | "You Got Style" | "Don't Say Nothing Bad (About My Baby)" | Sunshine QK 2890 | – |
| May 1970 | "Hello" | "Home To Stay" | Festival FK 3614 | AUS #48 |
| 1970 | "Rockhampton Happening" with The Jugband | "Rockhampton Happening" | RCA Custom ZHLM 0371 | – |
| 1971 | "Border Song" | "Come Hear My Song" | Festival FK 4363 | – |
| 1972 | "Glory Road" | "Over to You Now" | Festival FK 4633 | – |
| 1973 | "Rings" | "Come Hear My Song" | Festival FK 5146 | AUS #52 |
| 1974 | "Higher And Higher" | "Willie and Laura Mal Jones" | Festival K 5575 | AUS #93 |
| 1975 | "Harbour for My Song" | "That's the Way I Am" | Astor A 7253 | – |
| 1975 | "Good Morning Good Morning" | "If You See Her" | Astor A 7257 | – |
| 1975 | "Elizabeth" | "Little Ray of Sunshine" | Astor A 7265 | AUS #57 |
| 1981 | "Maybe Tomorrow" | | | AUS #56 |
| 1984 | "Rock & Roll You're Beautiful" | | | AUS #50 |

== Awards and nominations ==
=== Order of Australia (AM) ===
On June 10, 1994 Rowe was appointed as a Member of the Order of Australia (AM) for services to Vietnam veterans, the entertainment industry and the community.

=== ARIA Music Awards ===
The ARIA Music Awards is an annual awards ceremony that recognises excellence, innovation, and achievement across all genres of Australian music. They commenced in 1987. Rowe was inducted into the Hall of Fame in 2005.

| Year | Nominee / work | Award | Result |
|---|---|---|---|
| 2005 | himself | ARIA Hall of Fame | inductee |

=== Go-Set Pop Poll ===
The Go-Set Pop Poll was coordinated by teen-oriented pop music newspaper, Go-Set and was established in February 1966 and conducted an annual poll during 1966 to 1972 of its readers to determine the most popular personalities.

| Year | Nominee / work | Award | Result |
|---|---|---|---|
| 1966 | himself | Australian Acts: Male Vocal | 1st |
| 1966 | himself | International Acts: Male Vocal | 2nd |
| 1967 | himself | Australian Acts: Male Singer | 2nd |
| 1967 | himself | International Acts: Male Singer | 3rd |
| 1968 | himself | Australian Acts: Top Male Singer | 1st |
| 1969 | himself | Australian Acts: Top Male Singer | 4th |
| 1970 | himself | Australian Acts: Top Male Singer | 5th |

=== King of Pop Awards ===
The King of Pop Awards were voted by the readers of TV Week. The King of Pop award started in 1967 and ran through to 1978.

| Year | Nominee / work | Award | Result |
|---|---|---|---|
| 1967 | himself | King of Pop | Won |
| 1968 | himself | King of Pop | Won |
