= Pat Aulton =

English-Australian record producer, musician, arranger, and songwriter

- Born: William Patrick Aulton; 20 June 1938; Middlesex, England
- Died: 13 February 2009 (aged 70–71); Noosa, Queensland, Australia
- Occupations: Record producer; singer with The Clefs; arranger; songwriter; vocal coach
- Known for: Sunshine Records, Spin Records

William Patrick "Pat" Aulton (20 June 1938 – 13 February 2009) was an English-born Australian record producer, vocalist, arranger, songwriter, and vocal coach. He gained prominence as the lead singer of The Clefs and later as a pivotal pop and rock producer for artists on the Sunshine and Spin Records labels during the 1960s and early 1970s. He went on to become one of Australia's most successful composers of commercial jingles and worked extensively as a vocal coach.

He had five children; Kerry, Samantha, Chelsea, Bridget, and Alexander, which led to having many grandchildren and great-grandchildren.

== Biography ==
Aulton was born in Middlesex, England on 20 June 1938. He served in the British military, stationed in the United Arab Emirates then found himself in Australia at the end of his service. He began his music career as a vocalist with the Adelaide-based group The Clefs. Around 1963, Aulton began working for rising Adelaide entrepreneur Ivan Dayman and his Sunshine group, which grew to include a management and booking agency, record labels and a string of pop music venues from Adelaide to the north coast of Queensland. Aulton established the Sunshine Records label for Dayman and produced records for most of the performers on its roster, notably the string of Australian hit singles, EPs and albums by vocalist Normie Rowe, who was Australia's most popular solo artist in the mid-1960s.

Following the collapse in early 1967 of Sunshine and its short-lived sister label Kommotion Records, Aulton was hired as a house producer and A&R manager by Festival Records. He oversaw the installation of the 4-track recording equipment at Festival's new Pyrmont studio, and from 1967 to 1973 he produced and engineered most of Festival's pop output, as well as performing uncredited backing vocals and instrumental contributions on many of these recordings, one example being his distinctive falsetto on the 1968 Christopher James (real name Francis Edwards) recordings "Goodbye Mama" and "Going Home for the Last Time".

Between 1967 and 1973, Aulton produced many hit singles for local acts, released on the Festival and Spin Records labels. He produced all the Spin singles recorded by Sydney band The Dave Miller Set including their 1969 hit "Mr Guy Fawkes", which made the Top 10 in Sydney and was named "Single of the Year" by Ed Nimmervoll in Go-Set magazine. Other productions in this period include the acclaimed progressive rock albums Joint Effort by Jeff St John & Copperwine, and Wide Open by Kahvas Jute. He also produced the first two singles by Sherbet, who became one of the most popular and successful bands in Australia in the 1970s. Aulton also produced Neil Sedaka's 1969 'comeback' album Workin' on a Groovy Thing and the Australian hit single lifted from it, "Wheeling West Virginia", which were recorded at Festival Studios with Australian backing musicians. Aulton regarded his work with Sedaka as one of his career highlights.

After leaving Festival in 1973 he established a successful career as a writer-producer of advertising jingles; his well-known creations (some of which are still in use today) include jingles for Coca-Cola, Weetbix, Singapore Airlines and Trans Australia Airlines. His best-known and most influential production credit is probably "It's Time", the theme song for the Australian Labor Party's successful 1972 federal election campaign. Aulton spent several years in New York City as a jingle writer in the late 1970s.

After retiring to the Queensland coastal town of Noosa, Aulton worked as a vocal coach. In a short biography published on the website of former Clefs lead singer Barrie McAskill, Aulton reported in the mid-2000s that he was working on a novel.

== Death ==
Pat Aulton died of throat cancer in Noosa, Queensland with his family by his side, on 13 February 2009, aged 70. An article commemorating his life was published in the Sunshine Coast Daily on 17 March 2009.
