= Ivan Dayman =

Australian producer (1920–1989)

- Born: Ivan Howard Dayman; 20 July 1920; Walkerville, South Australia, Australia
- Died: 1 October 1989 (aged 69); Perth, Western Australia, Australia
- Occupations: Music promotor; record producer; venue owner; record label founder and owner; talent manager
- Known for: Founding Sunshine Records, Talent Manager of pop artist Normie Rowe
- Family: Marlene Dayman

Ivan Howard Dayman (20 July 1920 – 1 October 1989) was an Australian music promoter, record producer, label owner and talent manager of the 1960s and 1970s, based first in Adelaide, then Melbourne, Brisbane and Perth. Although his career was brief – ca. 1964 to 1968 – he is significant in the history of Australian popular music as the first person to establish an integrated entertainment group that included artist management, a booking agency, a chain of venues in major cities, and a recording label. He is also notable for the many successful artists he managed, including his flagship act, Australia's 1960s TV Week "King of Pop", Normie Rowe, whom he managed from 1965 onwards.

== Early life ==
Ivan Howard Dayman was born on 20 July 1920 to Howard Herbert Dayman and Gwendoline Vivienne née Starr of Walkerville. He grew up with two younger siblings. In April 1940, during the Second World War, he enlisted in the Royal Australian Air Force and was discharged under the rank of corporal in October 1945 from the Control and Reporting Unit. Dayman was engaged to Marge Mary Byrnes (c. 1920 – 2014) of Benalla, Victoria in December 1945. By July 1949 he was working as a contractor for East Torrens Council and living in Belair.

== Career ==
Ivan Dayman was working as a promoter for his Adelaide Swing Shows by December 1959.In 1963 he hired Pat Aulton (MC and former vocalist of band the Clefs) as a producer, arranger and songwriter in his promotions group. The Clefs were a local "R&B" dance band which performed at "the city's thriving club circuit."

By early 1964 Dayman had relocated to Melbourne where he leased the Festival Hall on Saturdays, which he renamed, Mersey City. He was the manager of England-born singer, Tony Worsley, and matched him with an existing group, the Blue Jays (see Bobby & Laurie), to form Tony Worsley and the Fabulous Blue Jays. They were his first act to perform at the Festival Hall.

He expanded his business interests into Brisbane where he established Sunshine Records in collaboration with Aulton and Nat Kipner (later formed Spin Records). American-born Kipner was a former real estate agent in the Gold Coast. The label's first single, "Jaywalker" (October 1964), was an instrumental by the Fabulous Blue Jays (without Worsley). It was followed a month later by "I Sure Know a Lot About Love" by Tony Worsley and the Fabulous Blue Jays. Sunshine Records releases were distributed by Festival Records.

Other artists signed or managed by Dayman were other than his flagship artist Normie Rowe included Mike Furber (from mid-1965), Toni McCann (from mid-1965), Peter Doyle (from mid-1965), and New Zealand acts the La De Da's (while they were in Australia, from mid-1967), and Mother Goose (from October 1976).

Dayman owned or leased multiple venues within his territory, such as Cloudland Ballroom in Brisbane (leased from Hans Apel in 1965), The Bowl Soundlounge in Sydney, and the Op Pop disco. He converted ten-pin bowling alleys into ballrooms by filling in the gutters with the same timbers. In Ipswich and Corrimal, such converted venues were re-named, Wonderland Ballrooms. The Corrimal Bowl was managed by Merriel Hume, a Brisbane vocalist who had regularly performed at Cloudland. By having a stake in both the bands and the venues, Dayman was able to monopolise the profits.

Dayman was respected by the musicians he hired because he treated them well and respected their abilities. An example of this is the fact that he paid for musical arrangements both instrumental and vocal. Further, he paid for rehearsals of the new arrangements and for vocal arrangements in keys that suited his stable of artists. He picked his vocalists from the cream of the Brisbane and Adelaide nightclubs and TV scene. All the bands and vocalists were therefore able to perform using the library of pop hits and standard arrangements.

The Cloudland Big Band was gradually replaced with smaller groups. These included the Rick Farbach Sextet, the Sounds of Seven led by Vance Lendich, and Darcy Kelly's the Highmarks. His actions resulted in a revival of dance hall attendances and the Cloudland Ballroom was often packed for the midnight to dawn dances that he held at long weekends.

Dayman was successful for several years, but the cost of his attempts to launch Rowe's career in the United Kingdom caused a drain on his organisation's funds. The Sunshine group and its related labels collapsed some time during early 1967; the Kommotion label was shut down, and the Sunshine label and its roster was subsequently taken over by its distributor, Festival Records.

Kipner moved to Sydney to manage the Bowl, but after 12 months there he sold his share in Sunshine; he subsequently founded the Spin label in 1967 with Harry M. Miller and Clyde Packer. Aulton remained as Sunshine's house producer, but unbeknownst to him, Dayman had made him a director of Sunshine, and when the company collapsed Aulton became liable for its debts. As a result, his car and furniture were repossessed by Sunshine's creditors, but he was rescued by a job offer from Festival managing director Fred Marks, who appointed him as a staff A&R manager and record producer, with responsibility for pop productions in 1967. Following the collapse of the Sunshine group, Dayman continued to work in entertainment and artist management into the 1980s.

== Death ==
Ivan Dayman's death was not noted publicly at the time, but official records indicate that he died in Perth on 1 October 1989.

== Family ==
Ivan and Marge Dayman's daughter, Marlene Dayman (born 1949), is a former Olympic swimmer. She competed as a 14-year-old at the Tokyo games in 1964 and finished 6th in heat 3 of the Women's 100-m backstroke. Earlier she had defied an instruction from the Australian Swimming Union not to march in the opening ceremony. The union banned Marlene (for three years) and three fellow swimmers, Nan Duncan (three years), Dawn Fraser (ten years) and Linda McGill (four years), from swimming for defying their instruction.

His son, Mark Dayman, joined his business in the 1970s and later ran the Adelaide operations of the company, organising concerts that included Australian acts of the 1980s, Cold Chisel, Australian Crawl, Sherbet, and Mi-Sex, but he subsequently left the entertainment industry. Commenting on this period, in a 2013 interview, Mark said:

"In those days the entertainment industry was not your everyday ethical business. It taught me how to read people and demographics, and judge ... the market and what would work given those factors. However, by my mid-20s I decided it was not for me."

Mark later managed a South Australian land, resource and infrastructure company called Fyfe Pty Ltd.
