= Lee Gordon (promoter) =

American entrepreneur and rock and roll promoter (1923–1963)

- Gordon in the early 1960s
- Born: March 8, 1923; Detroit, Michigan, U.S.
- Died: November 7, 1963 (aged 40); London, England
- Occupations: concert promoter, talent manager
- Years active: 1940s–1963; his death
- Spouse: Arlene Topfer (2 children)

Lee Gordon (born March 8, 1923 – November 7, 1963) was an American entrepreneur and rock and roll promoter who worked extensively in Australia in the late 1950s and early 1960s. Gordon's jazz and rock 'n' roll tours had a major impact on the Australian music scene and he also played a significant role in the early career of pioneering Australian rock'n'roll singer Johnny O'Keefe, serving as his manager.

== Early life and career ==
Many parts of Gordon's life story remain sketchy or obscure, and there is much contradictory information about him. The passing of time makes it increasingly difficult to verify or refute the various versions of his life and career, since many of his former close associates like his Australian colleagues Max Moore and Alan Heffernan are now deceased. Although both men wrote memoirs of their collaboration with Gordon, their accounts suggest that Gordon himself was the likely source of many of these contradictory tales, and that he may well have concocted these stories to cover his real activities. There are also notable periods for which there is little or no information about his whereabouts and activities, such as his mysterious trip to America in 1957–58, including his alleged "nervous breakdown" and extended hospitalization in Hawaii, his movements and activities after final departure from Australia in 1962, and his death in London in 1963.

According to the Australian Dictionary of Biography, Gordon was born in Detroit, Michigan in 1923, and educated at Highland Park High School, Highland Park, Michigan and at the University of Miami, where he graduated with a Bachelor of Business Administration in 1944. His U.S. World War II Draft Card (Order #12575) gives the name "Lee X Gordon" with March 8, 1923 as the date of birth, with the place of birth as Detroit and his residence in "H.P" [Highland Park], Wayne [County], Michigan. Census and other records indicate his parents were Louis and Jennie (Lopate) Gordon, who married in 1914, and that he had a younger sister, Paula.

His "Alien Certificate" (see image below), issued to him by the Australian Department of Immigration shortly after his arrival there in 1953, records his birth as 8 March 1923 in Michigan, although other sources claim that Gordon was born in 1917 in Coral Gables, Florida. His Certificate also, notably, has no entry in the line for "Previous name (if any)", which is at odds with the generally accepted account that he had changed his name from "Gevorshner" to "Gordon" some time before his arrival in Australia. It also indicates that he travelled from the U.S. by ship (vessel registration N1025V), disembarking in Sydney, and the attached identifying photograph provides a rare image of Gordon before he underwent plastic surgery to change the shape of his nose.

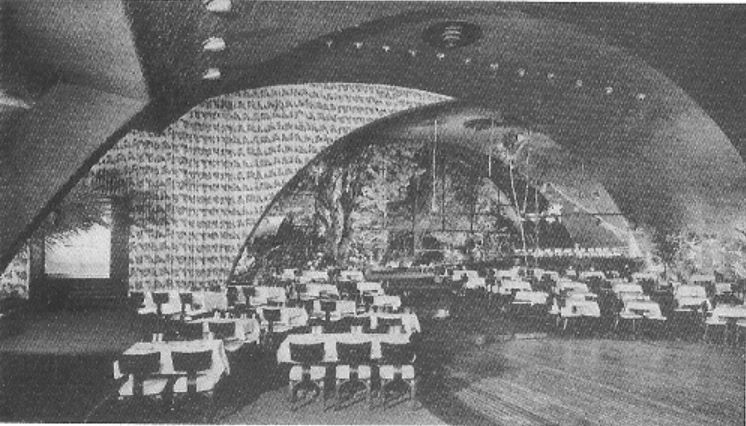
Tropicana Club, Havana, Cuba, 1953

By the time Gordon graduated from college, he had already begun his involvement in show business, presenting a jazz concert in an ice rink in Muskegon, Michigan. With noted publicist Benn F. Reyes (who was to play a major role in the Big Show tours) Gordon promoted a 'Shakespeare in the Round' project, and then worked for a time with Royal American Shows, a large Tampa-based travelling carnival. For unknown reasons, Gordon left America sometime in the mid-1940s and reportedly worked in several 'colourful' overseas business enterprises. In Lima, Peru, he was involved in a direct mail business, and later he moved to Havana, Cuba, where he exported cigars and roses to the United States and booked American acts into the famous Tropicana Club, Havana's famous open-air nightclub. The dating of his involvement with the Tropicana is uncertain, although it is possible that he was working there during the period that the Miami Mafia took control of the club in 1946.

On the official website of Gordon’s 1959 film, Rock’n’Roll, Gordon's activities and whereabouts in the years prior to his stay in Cuba in the late 1940s and his move to Australia in 1953 were made significantly clearer, through its discovery in August 2024 of Gordon’s inclusion in Miami University’s IBIS yearbook publications from the period 1941 to 1945, where he completed a degree in business administration with an honours year in law.

The mystery that surrounds his activities in Cuba, up until his arrival in Australia, vividly illustrate the contradictory, probably exaggerated and possibly even fictitious stories that Gordon told about his life. In this case, although there are several key elements in common, there are at least three extant versions of his life during this time, each of which differ notably in the details of events and locations. According to one version, he opened a chain of sixty "House of Grams" and "House of TV" retail stores in the US, but his gimmicky sales pitches supposedly angered the powerful US Electrical Retailers' Association, and Gordon was allegedly forced out of business, incurring a heavy financial loss. It was then, at the suggestion of his friend Arthur Schurgin, a Detroit promoter, that Gordon decided to explore the possibility of presenting big-name acts in Australia.

However, Gordon told at least two other different versions of this tale to his Australian business associate Max Moore. In one account, Gordon claimed that his retail venture was successful, and that he eventually sold it for US$550,000 (a very considerable amount at that time, and apparently the largest single sum he ever made during his life) but Gordon further claimed that he had subsequently lost the entire fortune within three years, backing two unsuccessful Broadway productions and several loss-making music tours. Although the details cannot be readily confirmed, and may or may not be true, this pattern certainly accords with what is known of Gordon's Australian career, where he repeatedly made and lost small fortunes on his music promotions and other enterprises. In a third (and perhaps least likely) version of these events, also recounted by Max Moore, Gordon claimed that in early 1953 he accepted a bet from some influential New York business people, who doubted his claims that he could start with nothing and become a success. He was challenged to prove himself and given a one-way ticket to Canada. Basing himself in Toronto, he moved into a luxury penthouse hotel suite, rented several retail properties and began advertising his new venture. Stocking the stores with TV sets, Gordon hired staff and used his proven hard-sell tactics and by the end of the first week he managed to make enough money to pay his bills; a short time later he apparently sold the business for a handsome profit. It was during his stint in Toronto that he allegedly met an Australian used-car salesman who encouraged him to try his luck in Australia.

== Australian career ==
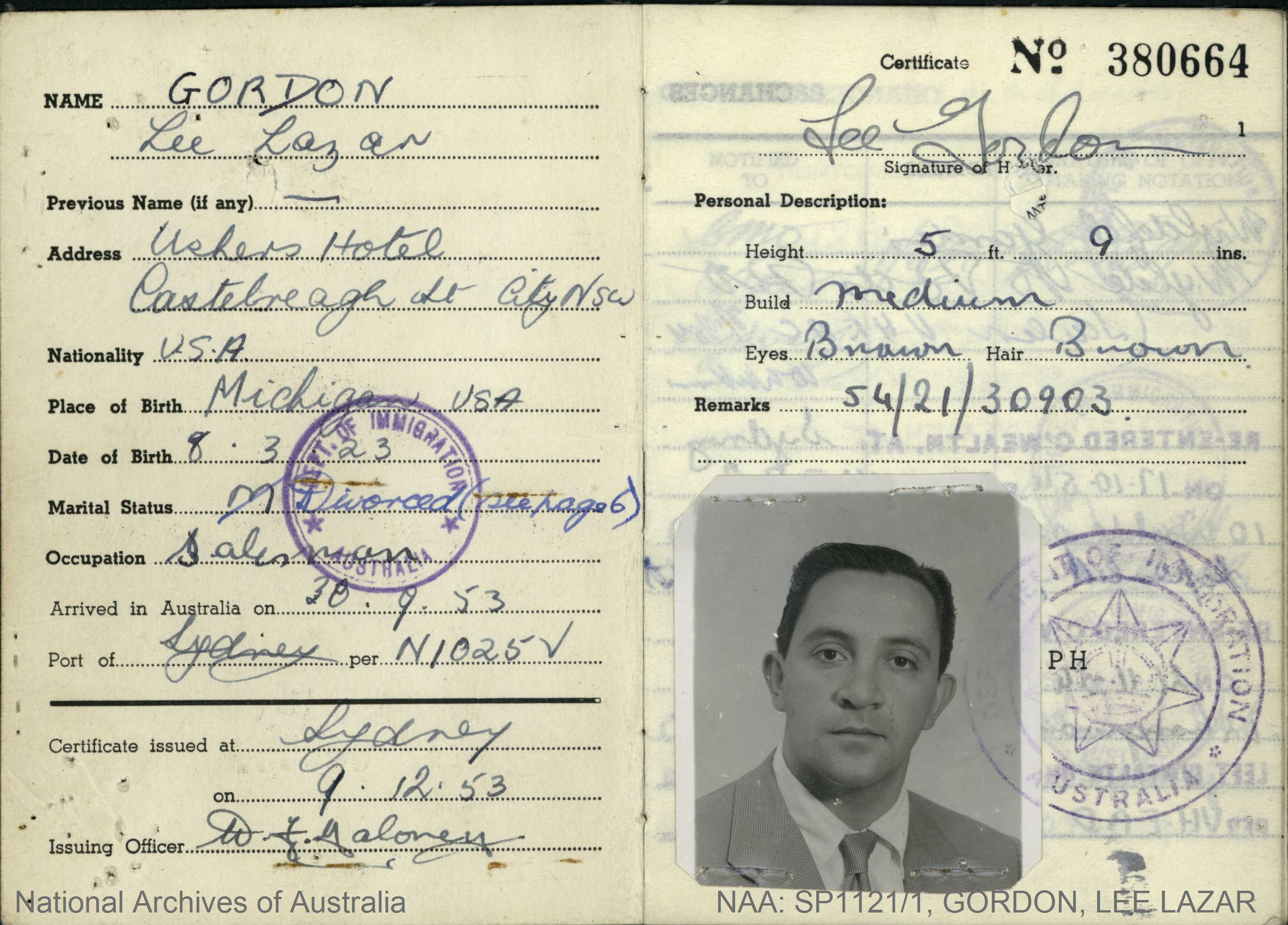
Gordon's 1953 Alien Certificate

Gordon arrived in Sydney on the 30th September 1953. He stayed for a time at the Ushers Hotel in Darling Point before moving into a rented harbourside penthouse in the prestigious eastern suburb of Point Piper, where he remained until he left Australia for the last time in 1962.

Gordon's first Australian business venture was a marketing business utilising the latest American techniques such as telephone quizzes, competitions and discount coupons on to lure customers into a Sydney furniture and electrical appliances retailer, Royal Art Furnishings. His deal with the company gave him a percentage of the increased business, and his marketing tactics proved so successful that the company sold thousands of appliances, earning a considerable sum in a short time.

From the springboard of his initial marketing success, Gordon then established himself as a music concert promoter in Australia. Backed by his recent earnings and tapping his connections in the American music business, he founded a promotions company to bring out leading American music artists. He was keen to minimise his tax liability — Australian tax law in those days charged a double rate on performers who worked in both Australia and the United States — so he hired a skilled accountant, Alan Heffernan, who went on to become his permanent accountant and general manager, as well becoming a close friend and confidante. Heffernan played a major role in Gordon's subsequent success and he helped to keep the company going through the mysterious period in 1958 when Gordon disappeared for almost a year. In 1954, Australian taxation law was amended, ending the punitive double taxation levied on artists who worked in both Australia and the U.S. As soon as the change took effect, Gordon terminated his work with Royal Art Furnishings to concentrate on building his concert promotions business.

=== The Big Show ===
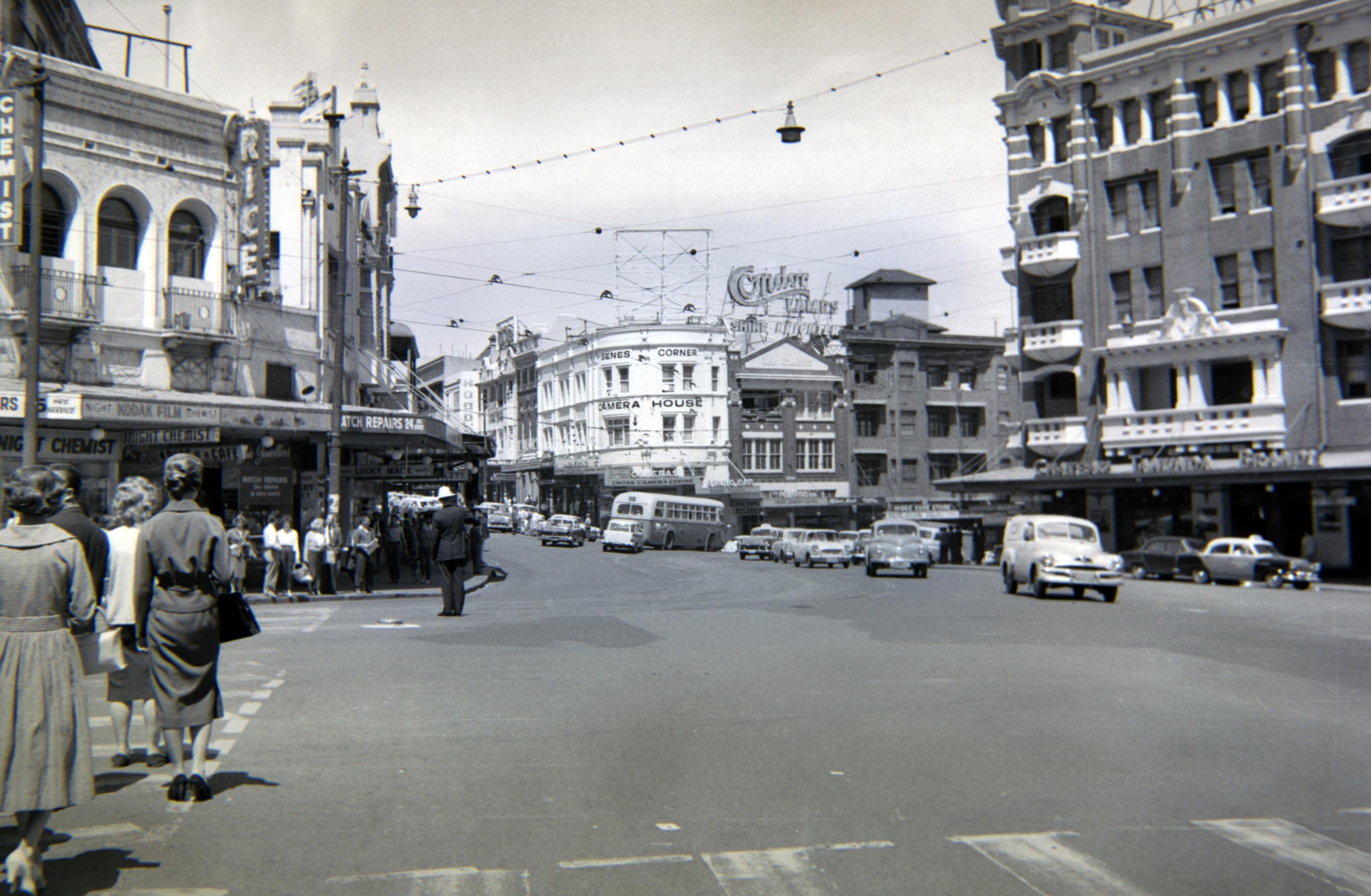
Kings Cross Sydney, 1960s

Gordon's new company, which traded as The Big Show Pty Ltd, opened an office at 151 Bayswater Road, Rushcutters Bay and in January 1955 he hired book-keeper and future promoter Max Moore as his assistant. Six months later Moore was elevated to the position of tour manager, and he coordinated most of the Big Show tours. The other Big Show staff at this time were Alan Heffernan (general manager), Perla Honeyman (publicity officer), Clive Mahon (assistant to Lee Gordon), Colleen McCrindle (Gordon's secretary) and receptionist Moira Delray.

Gordon negotiated a deal with venue owners Stadiums Limited for the use of their venues in Sydney, Melbourne and Brisbane, at a cost of AU£500 per session, and arranged the hire of Centennial Hall in Adelaide and suitable venues in other major cities. Stadiums Ltd was a famous Australian company that had been purchased in 1916 by colourful Melbourne business identity John Wren, whose life and career was the inspiration for John West, the central character in Frank Hardy's controversial novel Power Without Glory. Stadiums Ltd owned large venues in most Australian capital cities, including the Sydney Stadium, Melbourne Festival Hall and Brisbane Festival Hall. Through the first half of the 20th century these halls, which were originally built as sporting arenas, had hosted many major Australian boxing and wrestling matches, but they were ideal for Gordon's purposes since their "in-the-round" arenas were at the time the largest indoor venues in Australia's three east coast capital cities.

The notable except to this was Melbourne. The first Big Show tours in 1954 and early 1955 were all presented at the old West Melbourne Stadium, but it was destroyed by fire in the early hours of 24 January 1955, just before the last two Melbourne concerts of the first Australian tour by Frank Sinatra, whose shows had to be hastily relocated to the Melbourne Town Hall. The venue was soon rebuilt as Melbourne Festival Hall and was reopened in mid-1956, in time for the Melbourne Olympic Games, but in the interim Gordon was obliged to use a range of other Melbourne venues including the Town Hall, Leggett's Ballroom in Prahran, the Royal Exhibition Building, and the Palais Theatre in St Kilda, until the Olympics had ended and the new Festival Hall was again available for regular concert bookings.

With the Stadiums deal in place, Gordon refitted the stage at the old Sydney Stadium, installing Australia's first rotating stage, which was placed on top of the old fight ring in the centre of the arena. Located in Ruschcutters Bay, the Stadium was only a short distance from the Big Show office, but it was far from luxurious. Locally – and quite accurately – known as "The Old Tin Shed", it was a very rudimentary structure by modern standards. It was octagonal in shape, with raked wooden seats facing towards the central stage, and it had a maximum capacity of around 11,000. It was built with an iron and wood frame rising from a brick base, but the roof and walls were covered in corrugated steel, which was both unlined and uninsulated. This created a formidable echo which often made music and lyrics difficult to hear clearly, and although it proved to be well-suited to providing a facsimile of the 'slapback' echo found on many rock'n'roll records, once the audience started screaming, the reverberation made it impossible to hear anything, even on stage. At The Beatles' concert there in 1964, one Sydney newspaper sent along a sound engineer, who reportedly monitored the sound level from the hordes of screaming teenyboppers at well over 100 decibels. Adding to its drawbacks, the building had no air-conditioning or forced ventilation and its metal skin made it both unbearably hot in the sweltering Sydney summer (when many concert tours were scheduled) and deafeningly loud in heavy rain.

Gordon's "Big Show" tours were classic mid-20th century variety "package shows", starring a major imported performer (usually a singer) as headliner, with several other imported acts supporting, including singers, dancers and standup comedians. Because of his extensive connections in his homeland, and the musical trends of the day, virtually all the imported headlining acts on Gordon's Big Show tours were Americans. Early Big Show lineups did not feature a local support act, but due to both local Musicians Union rules and the high cost (relative to today) of transporting large backing ensembles to Australia from the US, a local orchestra or band was typically employed to provide backing for the visitors. For the first four Big Show tours of 1954 the visiting artists were backed by the local Wally Norman Swing Band; Norman was an accomplished jazz trumpet played and arranger who had previously played in the band led by Les Welch. For most subsequent tours 1955-59 for which a larger band was required this was provided by an orchestra led by Australian bandleader and arranger Dennis Collinson, who was Lee Gordon's musical director from 1955 until Collinson's death in 1959.

However, as the rock'n'roll boom grew in popularity and electric instruments came into wider use, there was less and less need for large backing ensembles. Another significant development over the course of Gordon's career was that, as his promotions began to concentrate more on rock 'n' roll, he began to include local rock acts like as supports. The first instance came out of necessity when one of Gordon's star attractions – Gene Vincent – was delayed en route and missed the first two shows of the tour, forcing Gordon to turn to rising local star Johnny O'Keefe and his band The Dee Jays to fill the gap until Vincent and his group arrived; this exposure also proved to be the turning point in O'Keefe's career. Another notable instance was that of singer Diana Trask, whose inclusion as a support led to her being encouraged to go to America by the tour's headliner Frank Sinatra. The presence of local performers on these prestige tours greatly boosted their national popularity, although it sometimes proved to be a double-edged sword for Gordon, because the formidable confidence, showmanship and musical prowess of the local acts (who were also keen to prove their mettle against the imported stars) occasionally upstaged the visiting Americans.

Although Gordon's Big Show tours soon came to dominate the market, and he was able to secure the lion's share of the top jazz, pop and rock'n'roll attractions of the period, he did not have the field to himself for long. Only one month after his first promotion, a jazz tour in July 1954, rival Melbourne-based promoter Kenn Brodziak presented his first international music tour, headlined by American jazz drummer Gene Krupa.

==== Ella Fitzgerald/Buddy Rich/Artie Shaw tour, July 1954 ====
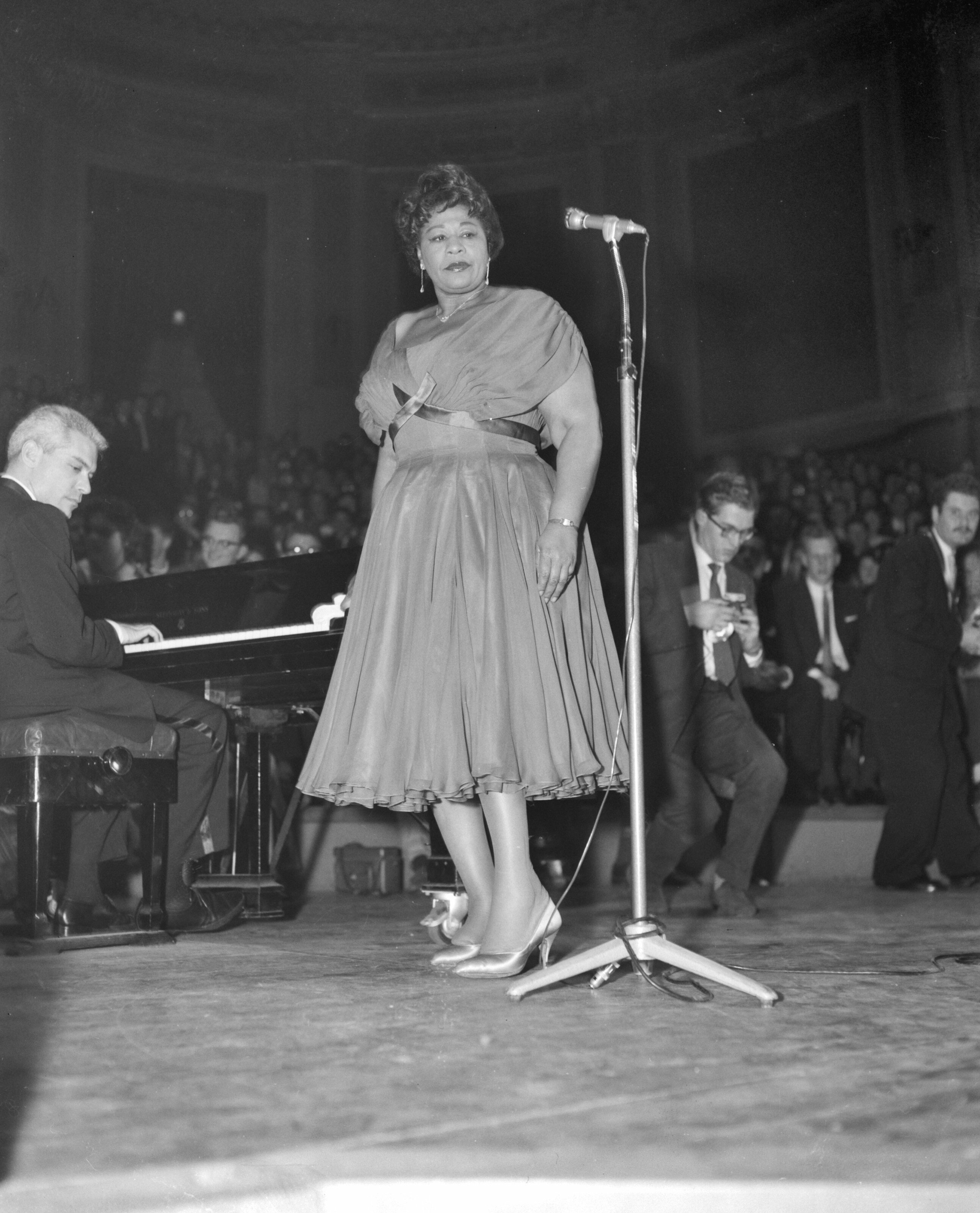
Ella Fitzgerald, 1959

Lee Gordon's first concert promotion, staged in July 1954, was an all-star variety 'package' tour featuring three of the biggest names in American jazz-vocalist Ella Fitzgerald, drummer-bandleader Buddy Rich and clarinettist-bandleader Artie Shaw, supported by comedian Jerry Colonna. It was a significant event in many respects. Fitzgerald's inclusion was a cultural breakthrough because it marked the effective end of the de facto Australian ban on African American jazz performers (see below). It was also an historic moment in the career of Artie Shaw – he had visited Australia once before, during WWII, but his 1943 concerts were restricted to service personnel only, so this 1954 tour was to be the first and only chance most local fans had to see him in concert. And, as Shaw indicated in press interviews at the time, he was to retire from performing altogether later that year to concentrate on writing. Although he did eventually return to performance for a few years in the 1980s, this was as conductor only, so his 1954 Australian tour was the very last time in his career that he fronted a band as clarinettist.

The Big Show tour played at the Sydney, Melbourne and Brisbane Stadiums to a rapturous reception, although it was also marred by a racial controversy. A contemporary article in the Melbourne Argus newspaper reported that the first two concerts of the tour in Sydney on 23 and 24 July featured only Artie Shaw and Buddy Rich, because Fitzgerald did not arrive in time for these Sydney shows. Although the Argus report quoted a local spokesperson for Pan-Am, who denied that they had been refused seats because of a "color bar", that was indeed the cause, and this was confirmed in December 1954, when Fitzgerald, Henry, Lewis, and Granz jointly filed a civil suit against Pan-Am for racial discrimination. As revealed by the original court documents (now in the U.S. Archives) Fitzgerald et al. alleged that Pan-American Airlines officials in Honolulu had ordered the singer and two of her three travelling companions (her assistant and cousin Georgiana Henry and her accompanist John Lewis) to leave the plane, even though they all had first-class tickets, and that they were even refused permission to re-board the aircraft to retrieve their luggage and clothing – although her (white) manager Norman Granz was not similarly treated, thus making it obvious that their treatment was based on their colour. In a 1970 television interview, Fitzgerald was asked about the incident and she confirmed that she had successfully sued the airline for racial discrimination and was awarded what she described as "a nice settlement".

As a result of the incident, Fitzgerald and her band were stranded in Honolulu for three days until they could board another flight to Australia and they missed the first two concerts of the tour, so Big Show had to organise two additional free shows in Sydney on 30 and 31 July to compensate ticket-holders, and an additional scheduled concert in Newcastle featuring Fitzgerald only also had to be cancelled after she fell ill. The Argus article noted that Shaw and Rich's Sydney performances were enthusiastically received, but that Shaw (who was famous for his perfectionism) took the unusual step of stopping the music halfway through the opening number, due to mistakes in the performance by his Australian backing ensemble, the Wally Norman Orchestra, although he was quoted as explaining to the audience: "The boys have tried really hard during the last few days, but they can't be expected to do three months' work in that time. I know I am setting a precedent by interrupting the number but I know you would rather me do that than for me to gloss over mistakes."

A number of later Australian sources claim that Gordon either just broke even, or lost money on this tour. Available contemporary press evidence about the grosses and costs of the tour throw some light on the question. A short article published in the Melbourne Argus just after the tour quoted Gordon's partner Benn F. Reyes as saying that the tour had grossed AU£46,000 in nine days – roughly equivalent to AU$1.5 million today – and that this was more than any other Australian theatrical venture to date. In a Melbourne Argus article published just before the tour, Benn Reyes remarkably revealed that the show's four stars would be paid US$10,000 per week each (about AU£5000). but the necessity of scheduling two free shows and the cancellation of the Newcastle concert would certainly have eaten into the whatever profit the company might otherwise have made.

A related item in American Billboard magazine published in September that year reported that an American "show business syndicate" was seeking to entice top American performers to tour Australia, that the syndicate was already in talks with performers including Johnnie Ray, Bob Hope, Nat King Cole, Guy Mitchell and Jane Powell, and that the syndicate was also negotiating to bring "key American jazz talent" to Australia. Of particular note is the report that the recent Fitzgerald/Shaw/Rich tour had set a new box office record in Australia and had grossed US103,000 over 13 performances. The article also records that the heads of this promotion syndicate were Lee Gordon and his old friends Arthur Schurgin and Benn F. Reyes. Reyes was a former journalist and veteran publicist with extensive experience in the Hollywood film industry; after his collaboration with Gordon he went on to become Vice President of Polaris Pictures, the production company set up by Stanley Kubrick, and Reyes worked closely with Kubrick on his three major films of the 1960s, Lolita, Dr. Strangelove and 2001: A Space Odyssey. Reyes died suddenly in 1968, aged 53, shortly after the release of 2001. Schurgin (1920-2003) was a veteran Detroit-based concert promoter who brought The Beatles to Detroit in 1964 and promoted local appearances by Harry Belafonte, The Monkees, Sammy Davis Jr., Nat King Cole, Elvis Presley, Artie Shaw, and Buddy Rich.

==== Johnnie Ray first tour ====
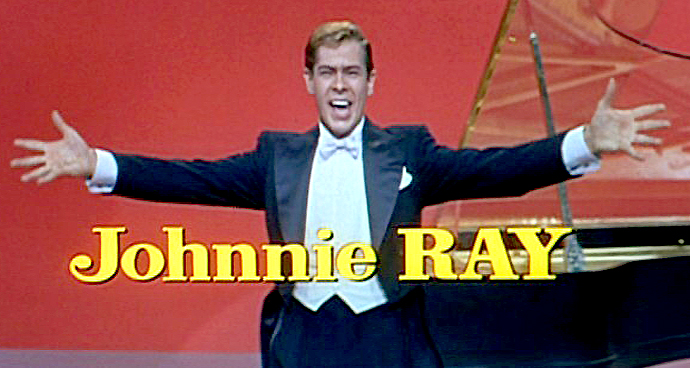
Johnnie Ray in There's No Business Like Show Business, 1954

Gordon's second tour was headlined by popular American singer Johnnie Ray in August 1954, on which Ray was supported by popular American film and stage dancers Peggy Ryan & Ray McDonald, and standup comedian Dave Barry, and this proved to be the turning point in Gordon's brief career. A week after tickets went on sale, receipts were so poor that Gordon faced ruin — according to Max Moore, visits by overseas acts were so rare at that time that many people thought these early tour promotions were hoaxes.

In an effort to save the tour, Gordon reportedly fell back on his marketing skills and launched a promotional blitz – he had millions of 8"x8" leaflets printed, which entitled the holder to a free extra ticket for every ticket sold, and had these "twofer" leaflets dropped from planes over Sydney, Melbourne and Brisbane. The tactic worked and the tour was a sell-out success. Remarkably, although some four million of these promotional leaflets were printed, Powerhouse Museum curator and music historian Peter Cox revealed in 2010 that he had never seen one, and the museum did not have one in its collection. The tour was reportedly a huge financial success – the Melbourne Age reported that Ray earned £30 per minute for each of his sixteen concerts and that he had three tuxedos and several shirts and ties ripped to pieces by emotional fans. Police posted extra officers at Mascot airport for his departure from Australia but the extra police and Ray's two "burly" personal bodyguards turned out not to be needed and he left the country quietly at the end of the tour.

==== Louis Armstrong tour ====
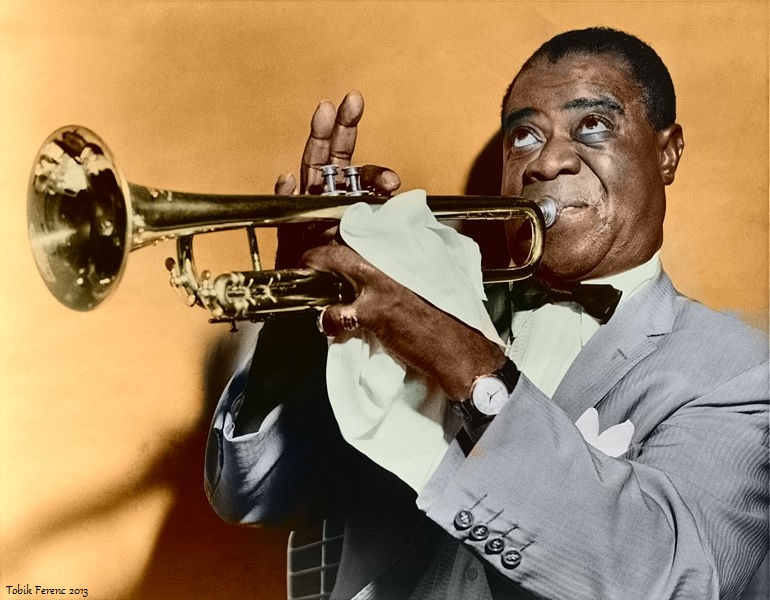
Louis Armstrong

Gordon's next promotion was another landmark in Australian entertainment – the first Australian tour by jazz legend Louis Armstrong and his group, who played 22 dates in October / November 1954. Alongside Fitzgerald's earlier visit, these tours marked the first times that African-American jazz performers had toured extensively in Australia as headlining acts since the notorious incident in 1928, when visiting jazz band Sonny Clay's Colored Idea were deported from Australia, after members of the band were allegedly found in 'compromising' situations with white women in their Melbourne accommodation. Since that time, according to Australian jazz historian Andrew Bissett, there had been an effective ban on African American groups entering Australia, and given that the White Australia Policy was still very much in force in 1954, the fact that Gordon was able to pull this tour off was a remarkable feat. Just prior to Armstrong's arrival, Gordon was quoted in the Sydney Daily Telegraph, lamenting that the airfares to bring Armstrong and his troupe to Australia was costing him almost as much as Armstrong's fee -- Armstrong was reportedly being paid AU£10,000 (US$22,400), but the airfares for him and his entourage, which included his wife, five musicians, a singer, and a staff of six assistants, was costing Gordon US$19,000.

Gordon's final tour of 1954 in December starred The Andrews Sisters and African-American singer Billy Daniels, who was famous for his million-selling signature song "That Old Black Magic". Although only two of the three Andrews sisters (Maxene and LaVerne) were part of for the tour, it was a success. According to a contemporary press report Maxine and LaVern stated that Patty no longer sang with them because her husband objected. but the reality was that the trio had formally split the previous year due to interpersonal tension (particularly between Maxene and Patty) that had been growing since the deaths of their parents in 1948 and 1949. When her sisters only learned via the press that Patty had decided to go solo, this precipitated a rift that ended the group until Maxene and LaVerne decided to continue as a duo in 1954. Even after they reformed problems persisted – in October that year Maxene and LaVern had appeared on the Red Skelton Show performing a parody number in which Skelton impersonated the absent Patty in drag and Patty was so incensed by this that she filed a cease-and-desist order against Skelton, and shortly after their Australian visit Maxene took a near-fatal overdose of sleeping tablets, although LaVerne insisted to the press that it was accidental.

Gordon's entrepreneurial spirit was highlighted by a press item which detailed a new "experiment" he was undertaking. Gordon had chartered a 700-seat train to bring fans from Newcastle to Sydney on the afternoon of the first Daniels-Andrews Sisters concert. The special train would take fans to Sydney's Central Station, from where they would then be driven direct to the Sydney Stadium in chartered buses. Gordon was quoted as saying that he wanted to test local interest in his Big Show tours in Newcastle, that if it was successful, he would charter another special train from the upcoming Nat King Cole tour, and that he would consider scheduling dates for future tours in Newcastle itself.

=== 1955 ===
Gordon and Big Show made local showbiz history during 1955 with no less than six first-time Australian tours by major American acts. Gordon kicked off the year with Nat King Cole (supported by singer June Christy and comedy duo Dan Rowan and Dick Martin) in early January. This was followed only a couple of weeks later by the first Frank Sinatra tour, then the first Frankie Laine tour in February, the landmark second Johnnie Ray tour in March, actress and singer Betty Hutton in May, and then two of the top names in American comedy – Bob Hope in late May-early June, and Abbott and Costello in June.

Although most of the musical tours were highly successful, and the Johnnie Ray tour was a smash hit that set a new box office record that would stand for the next decade, Big Show tour manager Max Moore later recorded that the company lost heavily on the two comedy tours. While contemporary press reports indicate that fans were clearly delighted by the chance to see so many of their idols live in concert for the first time, not everyone was so enthusiastic about the sudden influx of American talent. In late January 1955, Victorian R.S.L. president Mr N.D. Wilson called for a ban on the importation of American acts. Referring directly to the recent Big Show tours, Wilson claimed that local audiences were "being fooled", that Australian performers who had made their names overseas were unable to get a hearing, and he expressed the (predictable for the time) view that "we all know the British acts are better". Wilson also expressed amazement that Australian Actors Equity had not objected to the "flooding" of the local entertainment market by American imports, and his criticisms were strongly supported by Gordon Cooper, the manager of the Tivoli Theatre circuit (who not coincidentally were in direct competition with Big Show Pty Ltd. and their venue partners, Stadiums Ltd.).

==== First Sinatra Tour ====
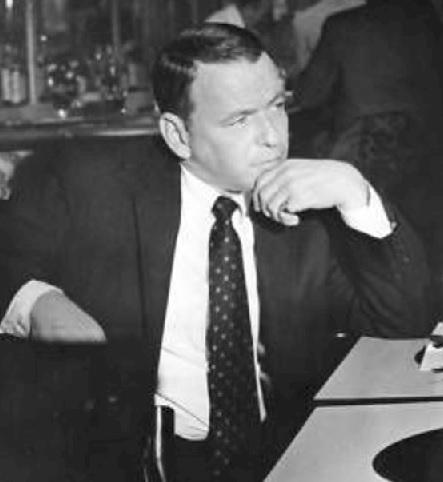
Frank Sinatra

Gordon scored one of the biggest coups of his career with the first Australian tour by superstar singer Frank Sinatra, who was supported by vocalist Ann McCormack, actress/dancer Lois Raye and comedian Frank D'Amor. The tour came at a pivotal time in Sinatra's life. He had suffered a disastrous career slump in the late 1940s and early 1950s, compounded by controversy over his alleged connections to the American Mafia, the death of his longtime publicist, his tempestuous affair with Ava Gardner and subsequent bitter divorce from his first wife Nancy, and the successive cancellation of his recording contract by both Columbia Records and MCA Records. But following his signing to Capitol Records and his teaming with arranger Nelson Riddle in early 1953, Sinatra had found renewed form and a deeper artistry. By the time he arrived in Australia in January 1955 he was on the brink of the peak phase of his 'new' career, and within months he would record and release of two of his greatest albums, In The Wee Small Hours (his first 12" LP), and Songs For Swinging Lovers. Sinatra's first Australian tour was a huge success for Gordon although Sinatra's daughter Nancy, who accompanied her father on the tour, later recalled it as a bittersweet experience, because Sinatra was reportedly then having a brief affair with Ann McCormack.

On this tour Sinatra was backed by the local Dennis Collinson Orchestra, augmented by his regular American sidemen Bud Shank (saxophone), Max Albright (drums), Nick Bonny (guitar) and Bill Miller (piano and conductor), and the setlist featured recently recorded Capitol songs, including the title song of his new movie "Young at Heart" (1955), as well as some songs from his earlier Columbia catalogue. Sinatra played four nights and six shows in Melbourne, then travelled to Sydney for two nights at the Sydney Stadium, then back to Melbourne for an additional five shows, closing on January 25, although the final concerts had to be held at the Melbourne Town Hall, because the old Melbourne Stadium was destroyed by fire in the early hours of January 24, making Sinatra the last person to perform there. (The venue was subsequently rebuilt as Melbourne Festival Hall). This Australian tour was also significant in Sinatra's own concert history, because it marked the last time he would perform his old Columbia favourite "The Music Stopped" on stage.

==== Johnnie Ray second tour ====
Johnnie Ray's second Australian tour in March 1955 was another landmark event. For this tour "Mr Emotions" was supported by tap-dancing duo The Clark Brothers, popular swing singer Helen O'Connell (longtime vocalist of the Jimmy Dorsey big band), and standup comedian Danny Crystal. Ray's emotionally charged performances electrified local audiences, and as writer Damian Johnstone notes, the tour's success proved conclusively that Australian audiences were willing to pay high prices to see leading American entertainers, kick-starting the demand for large scale tours by international acts.

Although Ray was not a rock 'n' roll performer, his distinctive and highly emotive style was an important bridge between the mainstream popular music of the 1940s and early 1950s and the emerging rock 'n' roll genre. He also had a great influence on Australia's first homegrown rock 'n' roll star, Johnny O'Keefe, who in fact had started his career as a Johnny Ray impersonator. O'Keefe saw Ray perform live several times on this tour and studied his idol carefully. In the event, Ray's second Australian tour proved to be far bigger than his first – he was mobbed by 10,000 fans at Sydney Airport and he set an Australian record for ticket sales that was not broken until the arrival of The Beatles in 1964. Ray played 24 sell-out shows at the 11,000-seat Sydney Stadium, equal to well over 260,000 ticket in Sydney alone, which is remarkable, considering that the population of Sydney at the time was something less than 2 million. According to tour manager Max Moore, Lee Gordon tried to whip up audience excitement by hiring a local tailor to stitch together a custom-made coat for Ray with 'breakaway' sleeves, and paid young girls to tear them off when he reached into the audience during his performance.

Ray's arrivals and concerts in each city sparked wild scenes of fan adulation – a reported 5000 people greeted him at Brisbane Airport, where "semi-frenzied" teenagers pushed past police and airport officials, broke through the roped-off cordon and rushed the plane's gangway. The crowd grabbed at Ray and nearly dragged him to the ground, tearing his 15-guinea drape coat and shirt and ripping the tassels from his shoes. The crowd frenzy was such that it took police ten minutes to get Ray off the plane and another 35 minutes to get him into his waiting car and out of the airport. The local press also reported that Ray claimed to be infatuated with both his support act Helen O'Connell and a local Sydney girl he had met on his previous tour. Ray denied that the story was a publicity stunt, but it was probably manufactured by Gordon's publicist and/or Ray's management, because he was actually a 'closeted' homosexual (although his sexuality was not officially confirmed until some years after his death in 1990). Ray was also received at Government House in Melbourne by then governor Sir Dallas Brooks in recognition of his work for Australian charities for the hearing impaired. Ray was himself partially deaf and during this tour he was appointed an Honorary Appeal Secretary of the Australian Association for Better Hearing.

A significant side note to this tour was revealed in an article published in the Perth Daily News in April, which reported that Gordon had recently insured the Sydney Stadium against fire for £100,000, and that he had also insured Big Show P/L against box office losses in case another fire damaged or destroyed the Stadium. According to the report, this was a reaction to the fact that four separate fires has been set in the Stadium during March 1955, and that the new revolving stage Gordon had installed for his tours had been destroyed.

==== Comedy and sports tours of mid-late 1955 ====
The Ray tour was followed by three comedy/variety tours that ran back-to-back across May and June 1955, respectively starring Betty Hutton, Bob Hope and Abbott & Costello. Hutton headlined during May, supported by comedian Morey Amsterdam. In April, the Melbourne Argus reported on Hutton and Hope's imminent arrival, and quoted Gordon, who said that it had become progressively easier to bring top line acts to Australia since he launched his company, particularly from a financial point of view:

I had a terrific battle at first to get people to come out to Australia ... It was like sending them to Uganda. But since then, Australia has had a lot of publicity, and stars are eager to come here for prestige reasons ... Betty asked me what sort of hotels we had in Australia, and I told her the truth. But nothing can keep Betty down – she is ready to raise the roof. I told her Melbourne had the only hotel in Australia.

This was immediately followed in early June by the first Australian tour by comedy legend Bob Hope, which surprisingly lost money, but Hope reportedly enjoyed the tour so much that he generously waived his fee and asked only for expenses.

In late June famed comedy duo Abbott & Costello made their first Australian tour. The duo were inveterate gamblers who spent much of their free time on the tour playing poker with Australian radio star Jack Davey, and they reportedly lost the equivalent of their entire tour fee, so they instructed Gordon to send their cheque to Davey, but because Big Show Pty Ltd was broke at the time, it bounced and no-one was paid. Their Sydney visit was also marked by a minor accident when the car in which they were travelling collided with a concrete mixer truck on Pyrmont Bridge. Although the comedians and Lee Gordon's publicist Perla Honeyman were only slightly injured, they were forced to cancel a planned visit to a local children's hospital.

Big Show's financial woes were compounded by a pioneering August 1955 tour by a troupe of American female Roller Derby players, another first for Australian audiences, but the tour failed to draw the expected crowds and Gordon took another big financial loss.

=== 1956–1957 tours ===
1956 began with the second tour by Nat King Cole in February, which also marked the first time that Big Show staged concerts in the Western Australian capital of Perth, where they were held at Subiaco Oval.

The third Johnnie Ray tour (March) was followed by Louis Armstrong All-Stars' second tour (supported by Gary Crosby, Nat King Cole, and Calypso king Harry Belafonte). A contemporary UK tour program indicates that Gordon was also jointly involved in promoting Louis Armstrong's subsequent 1956 tour of Britain, in collaboration with his old friend Benn Reyes. This was followed by the "Record Star Parade", which featured Don Cornell, satirist, radio star and voice artist Stan Freberg, Joe "Fingers" Carr, superstar drummer Buddy Rich and dance duo The Nilsson Twins, which proved very popular with audiences

1957 was a turning point both for Gordon and Australia, with Big Show presenting two of the first genuine "rock 'n' roll" tours to visit Australia, headlined by two of the hottest acts of the emerging genre (see following section), but the company also continued to promote more mainstream tours, with varying success.

Believing that he had found a winning formula with the first Record Star Parade, Gordon booked a similar tour for April 1957, featuring Lionel Hampton, Stan Kenton and vocalists Cathy Carr, and Guy Mitchell. The Australian Jewish Times gave the Sydney performance a glowing review, as well as highlighting the Jewish affiliations of Gordon, compere Joe Martin, and members of the touring bands, and noting that "huge crowd" attended the show according to Max Moore, however, Gordon's attempt to repeat the success of the Record Star Parade proved to be another financial disappointment.

In September, Gordon presented the third tour by Johnny Ray, supported by Australian jazz legend Graeme Bell, although preparations were disrupted when thieves broke into the Big Show premises on the night of 25 February and ransacked the office in an attempt to steal tickets. The company's last major promotion of the year saw The Nat King Cole Trio return for their third tour, supported by pioneering Australian indigenous singer Georgia Lee – credited as the first indigenous Australian female singer to record blues music – plus Afro-Caribbean dancing duo Yolanda and Antonio Rodrigues, The Gill Brothers, Joe Jenkins and Joe Martin, who acted as the MC for many Big Show tours.

==== Cancelled Frank Sinatra tour 1957 ====
Lee Gordon's scheduled second tour by Frank Sinatra, booked for mid-February 1957, ended in disaster when Sinatra abruptly cancelled just two days before the scheduled opening night. Sinatra apparently did not want to go on the tour, and on the pretext that his friend, songwriter Jimmy Van Heusen, was unable to get a seat on the flight to Australia, Sinatra cancelled the tour (it was also rumoured that Sinatra had simply decided to abandon the tour to play golf with Sammy Davis, Jr.). Gordon was reported to have been in Hollywood at the time and that spent several days fruitlessly trying to communicate with Sinatra in Honolulu in hopes of saving the tour.

Big Show Ltd took a heavy loss because of the cancellation, so Gordon sued, but in an out-of-court settlement, Sinatra agreed to perform a series of concerts in the US to compensate Gordon. The Sydney Morning Herald quoted Gordon as saying the settlement was valued at between £33,500 and £46,600 (about US$75,000-$100,000). However, according to Max Moore, on the subsequent American tour Sinatra insisted that he be flown everywhere in a DC7 aircraft, and on one occasion, when Gordon gave a non-committal answer about the aircraft's availability, Sinatra's manager Hank Sanicola reportedly punched Gordon several times in the head.

The Canberra Times reported in February 1957 that Gordon was also pursuing both Dean Martin and Johnnie Ray for future tours, and Gordon was quoted by AAP as saying that both singers had expressed "great interest", although neither had yet committed to signing a contract. The item also noted that Frank Sinatra had agreed to pay Gordon US$33,000 to compensate him for the losses he incurred when Sinatra cancelled his tour.

=== Rock'n'roll tours, 1957–58 ===
The rise of rock'n'roll provided Gordon with a lucrative new avenue of promotion, and his tours effectively kick-started the rock 'n' roll boom in Australia.

The front cover of the concert programme for the historic March 1957 Australian rock'n'n'roll tour by Bill Haley & The Comets and other artists

In March 1957, Gordon presented his first major rock'n'roll tour, an all-star bill with Bill Haley & The Comets, LaVern Baker, Big Joe Turner, The Platters and Freddie Bell and the Bellboys. Although local pundits were already predicting that rock'n'roll was a passing fad, the tour was a huge success, breaking box office records around the country, and over 300,000 people saw the show. During the tour Johnny O'Keefe met Haley several times and was given a number of songs by Haley—although with his typical chutzpah, O'Keefe greatly exaggerated the extent of the contact when talking to the press.

Gordon's second rock'n'roll tour, in October 1957, was even more significant. The all-star bill was headed by three of the biggest rock'n'roll stars in American music at that time -- Little Richard, Gene Vincent & The Blue Caps, and Eddie Cochran, supported by a singer then being touted as "the female Elvis", Alis Lesley. It was during this tour that Little Richard had his famous religious conversion, which was apparently prompted by his fear that the launch of Sputnik 1 (which took place during the tour) presaged the imminent end of the world. While travelling to a concert at Stockton Mental Hospital in Newcastle NSW, Little Richard declared that he had "found God" on the Stockton ferry, which prompted him to tear a number of expensive rings from his hands and throw them into the Hunter river, and when he returned to the U.S. he abandoned rock 'n' roll for several years and became a minister.

This tour was also a pivotal moment in the career of Gordon's protègé Johnny O'Keefe and it furnished him with his first big break. Just before the tour was scheduled to begin, Gene Vincent and his band were delayed in Hawaii, en route to Australia. Realising that Vincent would not arrive in time for the first shows of the tour, Lee Gordon approached O'Keefe to ask if he and his band The Dee Jays could fill in for Vincent at the first shows on the tour in Wollongong and Sydney, by performing songs from Vincent's repertoire, as well as backing up Cochran and Lesley (who were to have been backed by Vincent's band). O'Keefe agreed, but only on condition that he and the Dee Jays were allowed to perform three of their own songs. Having no alternative, Gordon grudgingly agreed. When O'Keefe and his band took to the stage at the first show in Wollongong, he was booed by the crowd, but his legendary determination and showmanship carried him through, and by the end of his set he had won the crowd over. This was repeated when they played at the first Sydney Stadium show the next night. O'Keefe came on to an initially hostile reception – at one point famously shouting, "Ya might boo me, but ya love me!" –, but by the end of the set he had the crowd eating out of his hand, and this proved to be the last time he was ever booed on stage. From this point his career took off rapidly. O'Keefe, whose popularity until this point was mainly confined to his home base of Sydney, became a regular and popular attraction on the Big Show tours, gaining a national exposure. Within a year he had scored a string of hit singles and he was confirmed as a bona fide rock star when he was given his own ABC television show, Six O'Clock Rock in early 1959.

In February 1958, Gordon promoted another historic rock 'n' roll tour starring Buddy Holly & The Crickets, Jerry Lee Lewis and Paul Anka. By this time the old Brisbane Stadium had been demolished; its replacement, Brisbane Festival Hall, was still under construction and the only suitable venue was the famous Cloudland Ballroom, which was located on top of a high ridge in the hills behind the city. Because of the difficult location, Gordon's staff hired a fleet of taxis to ferry patrons up to the venue. Max Moore described Lewis as being "more laid back than his image suggested", although the unfortunate Anka was reportedly subjected to some vicious anti-Semitic abuse from Lewis' entourage.

In July 1959, Gordon presented a tour promoted as "The Battle of the Big Beat – USA Versus Australia". It featured "Mr Personality", Lloyd Price, Conway Twitty, the Kalin Twins and Linda Laurie from the US, with an all-star lineup of local supports: Col Joye & Joy Boys, Johnny O'Keefe & The Dee Jays, Johnny Rebb & His Rebels, rising New Zealand rocker Johnny Devlin & The Devils, popular vocal group The Delltones and Dig Richards & The R'Jays.

=== Lee Gordon and Elvis ===
Gordon's biggest unfulfilled ambition as a promoter was to bring Elvis Presley to Australia, and he never succeeded in this, despite many representations to Elvis' formidable manager Colonel Tom Parker. However Gordon did get close to his quarry and was involved in several short U.S. tours by Elvis Presley during 1957. This is notable because although most Australian sources suggest that Gordon did not leave Australia until sometime in early 1958, Peter Guralnick's book Last Train to Memphis records that Lee Gordon was in fact in America during 1957 and that he promoted at least two short tours for Elvis during that year. These included Presley's Northeast tour of March 1957, and his subsequent West Coast tour of September 1957, which included dates in San Diego, Oakland, his first concert in Hollywood and his first three-date visit to Hawaii; on this latter tour, Guralnick reports, Gordon did "his usual good job" of promotion.

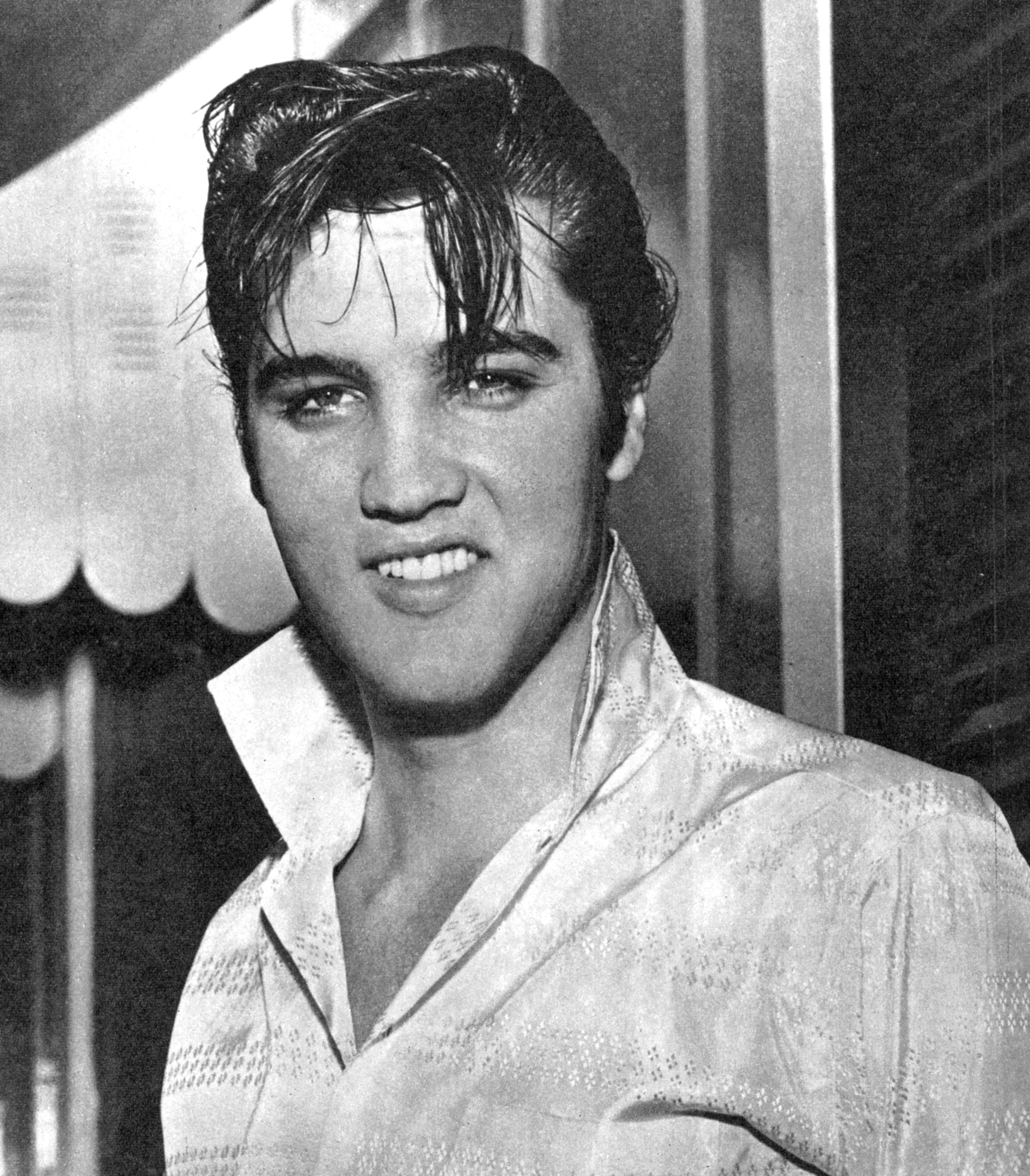
Elvis Presley, 1958

On returning to Australia on 19 August 1959 Gordon announced that he had signed an agreement with Presley's manager Col. Tom Parker for Presley to perform here, but this of course never eventuated. Although promoting an Australian tour by "The King" would have crowned Gordon's career, he was evidently unaware of the real reason that such a tour could never take place – the man who called himself "Tom Parker" was in fact Andreas Cornelis van Kuijk, a Dutch citizen who had entered the United States illegally in 1929 and had never been naturalised as a U.S. citizen. Consequently, throughout Elvis's touring career, and in spite of the vast sums his client was being offered, Parker resolutely refused to allow Presley to tour outside the American mainland, fearing that his immigration status might be detected and that he would be deported back to his native Holland. The only time Presley ever performed outside the continental United States were five concerts in Canada in the late 1950s, and his famous globally-televised "Aloha from Hawaii" concerts in Honolulu in 1973.

=== Gordon and O'Keefe ===
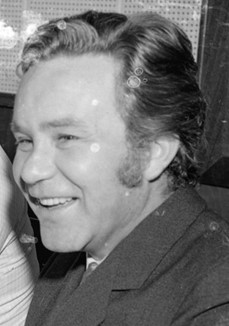
Johnny O'Keefe, 1969

Although he undoubtedly did much to further Johnny O'Keefe's career, Gordon's personal relationship with O'Keefe is controversial and was not viewed favourably by many of the singer's family, friends and colleagues. According to O'Keefe biographer Damian Johnstone, Gordon introduced O'Keefe to marijuana during 1957; an associate later commented that the singer took to it "like mother's milk" and they often smoked it together. Largely because of this, Dee Jays drummer Johnny "Catfish" Purser considered Gordon a bad influence on O'Keefe, and Dee Jays saxophonist Bob Bertles later said that he avoided Gordon and O'Keefe as a pair, and that they were "... bad news together. Double trouble."

Despite his supposedly negative personal influence on O'Keefe, Gordon was concerned about his friend's career direction. He disagreed with O'Keefe's plan to try establish himself in the United States and strongly opposed both of O'Keefe's visits there in 1959 and 1960

On 27 June 1960, O'Keefe narrowly escaped death in a car accident after he fell asleep at the wheel of his car and ran into an oncoming truck just outside Kempsey in northern NSW. O'Keefe and his two passengers were badly injured. O'Keefe was thrown through the front windscreen of the car, and suffered severe head and facial injuries which required extensive plastic surgery, and it is possible that undetected neurological trauma contributed to O'Keefe's subsequent and lifelong mental health and drug problems. Soon after the accident, Gordon advised him to turn his misfortune to his advantage, and O'Keefe later told Sydney DJ Bob Rogers that he had his scars "accentuated" with makeup and announced that the audience would see his face change week by week; as a result, O'Keefe said, ratings increased as people tuned in to see his face change.

Gordon helped O'Keefe after the singer suffered a serious mental breakdown in London in early 1961. After dropping out of his unsuccessful second US tour, O'Keefe flew to the UK on impulse and checked into a London hotel but soon after arriving he overdosed on a mixture of prescription medication, alcohol and marijuana. He woke several days later in to find himself in a psychiatric hospital in Tooting Bec. O'Keefe spent a hellish period in a straight jacket, confined to a padded cell and heavily sedated with drugs, but several days later he was recognised by an Australian doctor, who confirmed his identity. However, as soon as he was allowed out into the grounds he escaped and returned to his hotel. Luckily, Gordon was in London at the time and after O'Keefe located him Gordon advised him to return to the hospital; O'Keefe did so, and he was transferred to St George's Hospital, and eventually released.

=== Leedon Records ===
Most accounts of his life suggest that, some time in early 1958 (soon after the Buddy Holly tour) Gordon abruptly left for the U.S. Although his reasons for doing so may never be known, his company had lost considerable amounts of money on a number of failed tours. However, before he left, he branched out into the record industry, acquiring the Australian rights to the American Roulette Records label (owned by notorious US impresario Morris Levy, who was reputedly linked to the American Mafia and became infamous for his crooked dealings with artists). Gordon registered a new company, Lee Gordon Records Pty Ltd, which traded under the Leedon Records and Lee Gordon Records labels. Immediately after the record company was set up, Gordon disappeared overseas, leaving Alan Heffernan and Max Moore in charge.

Leedon made a deal with the Australian Record Company (which would be taken over by CBS two years later) to press the Leedon discs. The label's first two releases were "Oh-Oh, I'm Falling in Love Again" by Jimmie Rogers and "(Make With) The Shake" by The Mark IV. In its first few months Leedon released several more singles under licence from small US labels. They included "Endless Sleep" by Jody Reynolds, "Rebel Rouser" by Duane Eddy and "Rockin' Robin" by Bobby Day.

One intriguing facet of the Leedon story is the group of recordings the label released during 1958 which were attributed to an artist called Johnny "Scat" Brown. Curiously, although Gordon had 'disappeared' to the US — where he was purportedly being treated for a nervous breakdown — Max Moore states that Gordon in fact maintained his involvement with Leedon, and that it was he who sent Leedon the tapes. Johnny "Scat" Brown was, in fact, a pseudonym (invented by Alan Heffernan) for an anonymous American Elvis soundalike vocalist who cut a number of covers of current US hits such as Sheb Wooley's "The Purple People Eater" and David Seville's "Witch Doctor". Decades later, Alan Heffernan discovered that the mystery vocalist was in fact rockabilly singer Johnny Powers.

The Leedon label was quite successful with its early releases — Max Moore claims that Leedon scored twelve records in the newly established (Sydney) Top 40 and the company had expanded to eight staff by the time Gordon returned from overseas in late 1958. Gordon himself also made two 'vanity' recordings, credited to himself as composer, in which he expounded Beat-style spoken word lyrics over a 'cool' jazz backing performed by uncredited musicians. The two tracks, "Get The Message" and "She's The Ginchiest" were released on Leedon during 1959, but it is not known if Gordon recorded the tracks in Australia before he left (although "She's The Ginchiest" contains a reference to the Sydney suburb of Paddington), or whether they were cut in the US and sent back to Sydney for release.

However, Johnny O'Keefe's biographer Damian Johnstone states that Leedon found it difficult to sustain its license arrangements and often lost out to the Australian arm of the British-based EMI conglomerate, which at that time dominated the Australian recording industry. By mid-1959, Leedon was struggling to stay afloat and it was evident to Alan Heffernan that they needed to take action to bolster the company's flagging fortunes.

Johnny O'Keefe was brought in as the company's A&R manager and he began signing up local artists. At this stage O'Keefe was still signed to a recording contract with Australian independent label Festival Records, but he was otherwise free to work with Leedon. For production work he used the name Eddie Cash Jnr. Heffernan later stated that there was only ever a spoken arrangement between O'Keefe and the label, and that the fees for his appearances on Gordon's Big Show tours were increased to remunerate him for his work for Leedon. With O'Keefe's guidance, Leedon signed up a number of Australian acts including Lonnie Lee, Barry Stanton, Warren Williams, The Delltones, and Booka Hyland

=== "Disappearance", "breakdown" and return, 1958-59 ===
Some sources state that soon after the establishment of Lee Gordon Records and the historic tour by Buddy Holly in February 1958, Gordon disappeared overseas – although, as noted above, Elvis Presley biographer Peter Guralnick records that Gordon was already in the U.S. during 1957 promoting tours by Elvis Presley, possibly as part of his ongoing attempts to secure Presley for an Australian tour. Virtually nothing is known of Gordon's activities in America during 1958 but around September that year his mother telephoned Big Show's managing accountant Alan Heffernan and told him that Gordon had suffered a serious mental breakdown and that she had tracked him down to a sanatorium in Hawaii, where he had evidently been staying for several months. He had been released into his mother's care and was being treated by a prominent psychiatrist, although his recovery took several more months and he did not return to Australia until late in the year.

Meanwhile, Alan Heffernan and Max Moore kept Big Show Pty Ltd running in Gordon's absence, although the company continued to lurch from success to failure. A 1958 tour by pianist Liberace ran into trouble moments after the curtain went up on the first performance (which, possibly because of the expected smaller audience, was staged at the Sydney Trocadero rather than the usual Big Show venue at Sydney Stadium). According to tour manager Max Moore, Liberace came on stage and announced that because the music from Lerner and Loewe's My Fair Lady was "on restriction" (presumably because of copyright restrictions) he was unable to perform, and he walked off without playing a note. The audience stormed the box office, demanding refunds, and the first two Sydney concerts were cancelled, but the tour evidently went ahead and replacement concerts in Sydney were arranged a week later. Nevertheless, according to Max Moore, Big Show lost "a bundle" on the tour, the company sued Liberace for breach of contract, and the case dragged on for years.

In March 1959, Big Show presented the "Parade of Stars" tour featuring Tommy Sands & The Sharks, The Platters, and Frankie Avalon. It was a huge success, although Gordon was still in poor shape mentally and the tour's success was mostly due to the efforts of general manager Alan Heffernan and tour manager Max Moore. It proved such a financial success that Heffernan contacted Gordon's mother in America to bring Gordon back to Australia.

Big Show Pty Ltd promoted three other major tours that year, including a return visit by Frank Sinatra, as well as the first Australian tours by Sammy Davis Jr., and Johnny Cash. Johnny Ray made his fifth visit in September 1959, when he was supported by Johnny O'Keefe, who was by then the biggest star on the local Australian music scene.

=== Rock 'n' Roll (1959 film) ===
The Big Show October 1959 tour, headlined by American teen heartthrob Fabian, was highly significant because Gordon would commission pioneering director, Lee Robinson, and took the very unusual step of having the concerts at the Sydney Stadium recorded and filmed in 35mm (black & white) and released it as a feature film, entitled simply "Rock 'n' Roll". Premiering on 31 October 1959, it is of tremendous historical importance because it is believed to be the only 35mm feature-length film of a live rock and roll concert from the 1950s in existence. It had a limited public release at the time but soon dropped out of circulation.

Although long believed to have been lost, the film was rediscovered in Melbourne in 2020 by Melbourne resident Mark Iaria, who restored and self distributed the film via limited public screenings in Australia. The first screening on this journey was in Newtown, Sydney in 2023. In attendance were four stars of the film, in Col Joye, Lonnie Lee, Tony Brady, and John Charter. On April 6 2024, the film was uploaded in its entirety onto YouTube. It showcased the Australian stars of the tour, including Johnny O'Keefe and Col Joye, but headliner Fabian reportedly had to be cut out of the film after his manager objected due to a rights issue as he was contracted to 20th Century Fox.

=== Discovery of Diana Trask ===
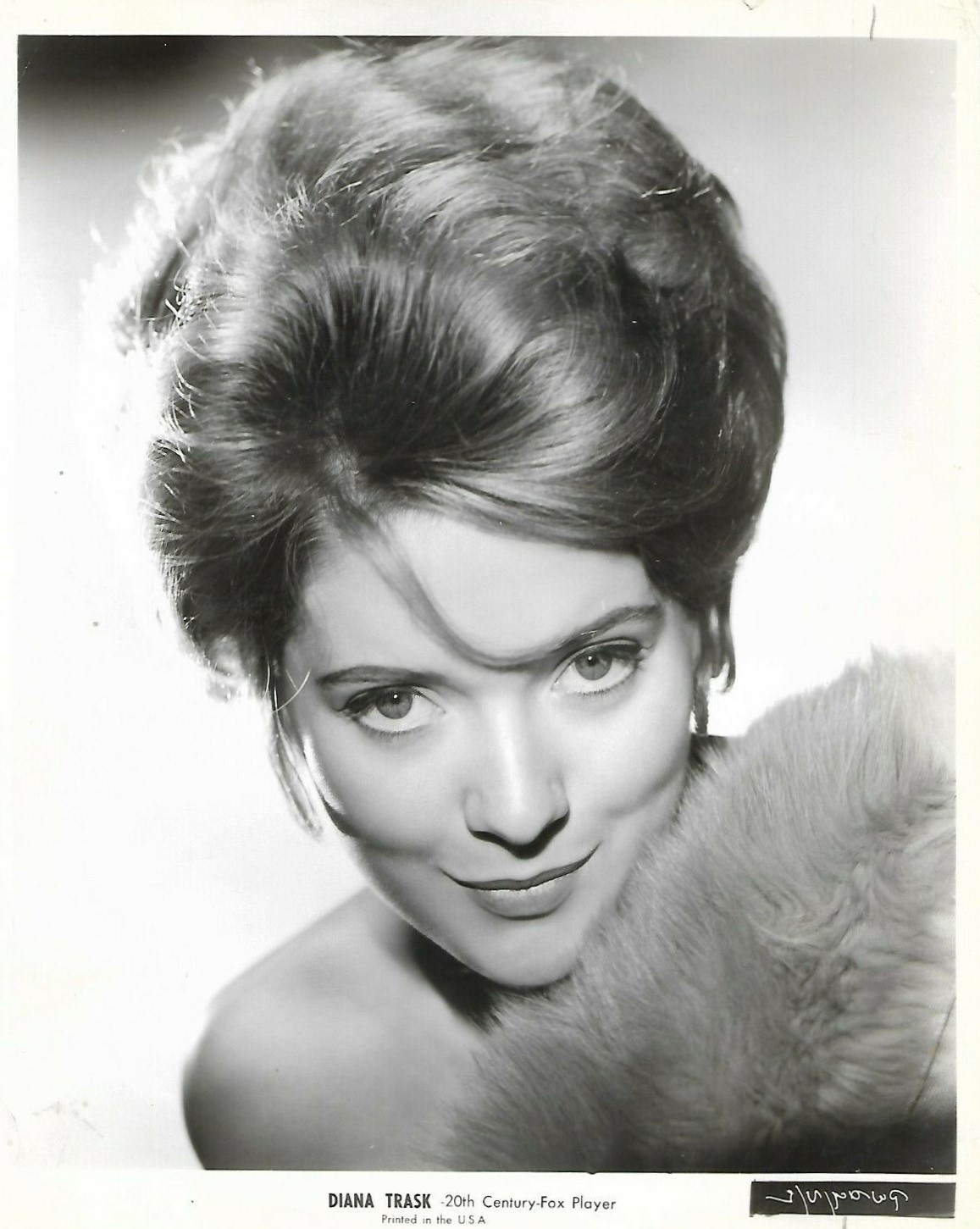
Diana Trask, 1961

Shortly after his return to Australia, Gordon played a pivotal role in the career of Melbourne-born singer Diana Trask. Gordon spotted her singing in a Sydney club in early 1959 and signed her as the support singer for the Stan Freberg tour of New Zealand, which also featured the Australian Jazz Quartet and Frank Ifield. Impressed, he then signed her to tour Australia with the upcoming Frank Sinatra show. The singer was rehearsing "My Funny Valentine" for her performance when Sinatra and his then manager Hank Sanicola came into the room. Sanicola exclaimed, "This kid can't sing that song! That's Frank's song!" but Sinatra said, "If the kid wants to sing the song let her sing it. She sings it better than I do." and Trask's version was allowed to remain part of her set. Trask opened the show and although there were calls from the audience to "get on with it", most soon were won over by her. As a result of her performances on the Sinatra tour, Gordon also selected her to tour with Sammy Davis Jr. Sinatra was impressed enough to suggest that she should try her luck overseas and recommended her to contacts back in the U.S. Thanks to Sinatra's patronage, in August 1959 she secured a four-week engagement at the Blue Angel nightclub in New York City. On her first night, Sinatra sent a good luck telegram and he attended in person later in the season with a group of about 20 people. Many months of touring and promotion followed, but her appearance on Don McNeill's Breakfast Club was seen by legendary A&R manager Mitch Miller, who signed her to a recording contract with the prestigious Columbia Records; from there she went on to a very successful career in the US as both a singer and an actress.

=== Coccinelle at 'Lee's of Woollarah' nightclub ===
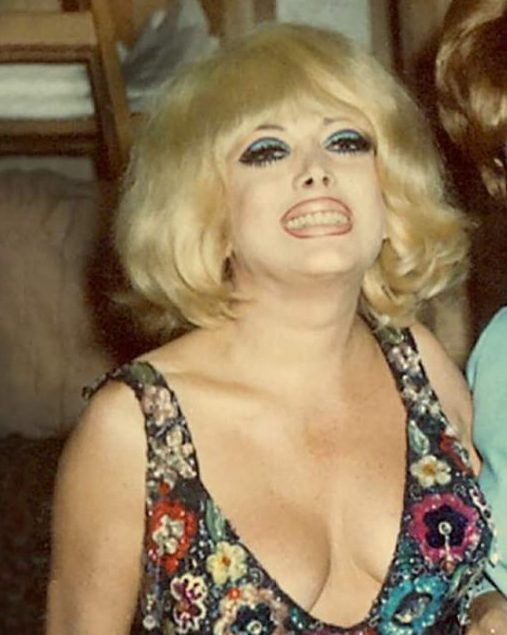
Coccinelle, transgender performer

Lee's of Woollahra was an upmarket adult cabaret night spot, opened by Gordon in 1959. It featured exotic entertainers, most notably the renowned Parisian performer "Coccinelle", for whom Gordon had developed a fixation. The French actress, singer, cabaret artiste and trans activist, whose real name was Jacqueline Charlotte Dufresnoy, was the first widely publicised instance of gender reassignment in Europe in 1958, gaining wide publicity and earning her international notoriety. The club, like Gordon's other late-career ventures, did not last long.

As told by Coccinelle:

In 1959, I was offered a contract to tour Australia. My impresario, Lee Gordon was really on the ball. An army of journalists, radio reporters and cameramen were there, on my arrival at Sydney airport. It wasn't long before I learnt the reason.

In 1959 Australia was still very puritanical. A strip-tease hadn't yet been seen in Australia. A few shows had nude girls but they stood absolutely still and didn't smile.

When Lee Gordon learned that my Paris show included a strip-tease he concocted a Machiavellian scheme. He announced the coming engagement to the proper authorities and described the numbers in the show. At the mere sound of "strip-tease" the authorities screamed. Then Lee let loose his secret weapon. "But it's a man. You can verify that in his passport.

So little Coccinelle flew in from Paris to open a new chapter in Australian show business.

I went on twice nightly at seven and eleven except Sundays.

When my Australian stay was up, Lee Gordon pleased by our mutual success gave me a surprise present, my return to Paris was to be via the Pacific, with an eight day sumptuous vacation in Hawaii. Off on the wings of a plane, arrival in Hawaii and voila! I'm installed in a grand hotel on marvelous Waikiki Beach. I was soon stretched out on the golden sand, scandalising the locals as I was absolutely the only one wearing a French bikini, a tiny and most revealing one at that.

=== Ricky Nelson tour ===
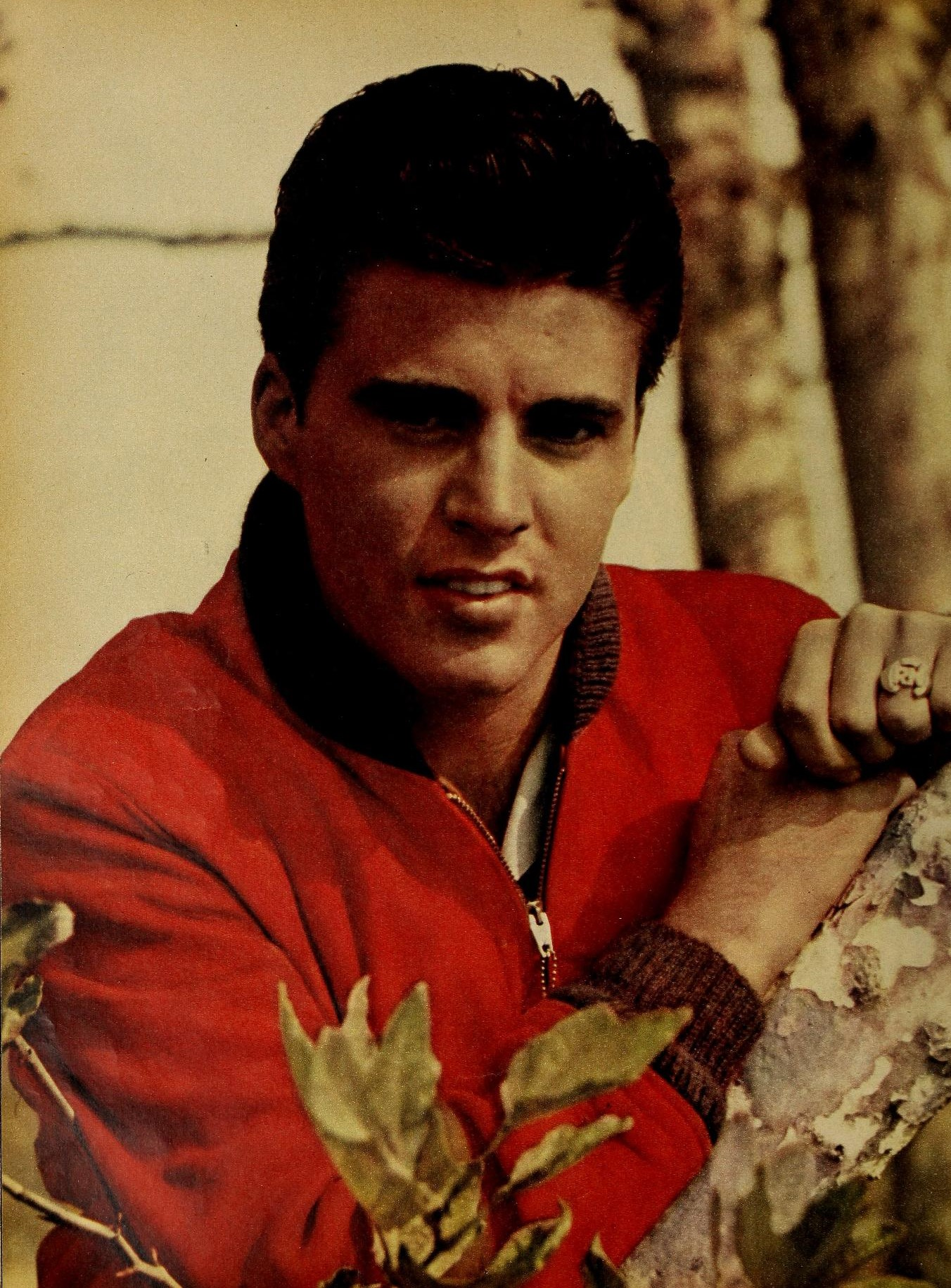
Ricky Nelson, 1959

In September 1960, after two years of protracted negotiations, Gordon managed to book a concert tour by former TV teen heartthrob turned rock'n'roll star Ricky Nelson. The tour was supported by a strong lineup of Australian acts: Col Joye & The Joy Boys, Lonnie Lee, Dig Richards & The R'Jays, Candy & Mandy (a female vocal duo Gordon had discovered), and Johnny O'Keefe & The Dee Jays, in their first major concert performances since O'Keefe's near-fatal car accident earlier in the year. By this time, O'Keefe's local popularity had become so great that many visiting acts complained about having to follow him. According to Big Show tour manager Max Moore, several acts including Ricky Nelson and Jimmie Rodgers, "felt the full wrath of Australian audiences when they couldn't cut it with the local talent". As a result, for the Nelson tour, Gordon initially had to schedule O'Keefe to play first, so that there would be at least an hour between his appearance and that of headliner.

Moore and Gordon also had to contend with O'Keefe's self-promotional antics. Although O'Keefe and Joye were good friends, there was intense professional rivalry between them, and on the Nelson tour they could not agree over who should close the local support segment of the show. After much argument between the two camps, Gordon brokered a deal in which the two singers alternated as the closing act of the first half of the show. On the tour's opening night, Col Joye played first and O'Keefe closed the set, but on the second night – when O'Keefe was supposed to open the show – he deliberately waited outside until Joye was obliged go in his place, before entering the venue. The next time O'Keefe was scheduled to open the show, he again failed to arrive on time, claiming he had been held up at the ABC with his TV show Six O'Clock Rock. At the next show, O'Keefe again delayed his arrival, and Col Joye refused to go on first, but Gordon eventually convinced him to open the show – and needless to say, as soon as Joye began playing, O'Keefe made his entrance. But Gordon had by now lost all patience with O'Keefe's antics and he retaliated by locking him in his dressing room. O'Keefe flew into a rage, kicking the walls, trying to break the door down, and screaming to be let out, but Gordon kept him locked in the dressing room for the entire show and he did not appear that night. However, the tactic worked, and by the following night a chastened O'Keefe had learned his lesson. Another notorious piece of O'Keefe self-promotion was his habit of encouraging sections of the audience to chant "We want Johnny! We want Johnny!", no matter who was on stage – until, one evening during the tour, Lee Gordon went out into the audience and was approached by a girl who asked to know when they were supposed to start chanting, and Gordon, who was having none of it, again retaliated by locking O'Keefe in his dressing room.

In 1960, Gordon went to Sydney radio station 2UE to record radio advertisements for the upcoming Everly Brothers Big Show tour, which local DJ Graham "Spider" Webb had been hired to read. As the session progressed, the young staff panel operator expressed his displeasure with the rather staid presentation, and when challenged by Gordon, he proposed adding music 'stings' of the artists being promoted, to make the advertisements more exciting. Gordon agreed to the suggestion, and was so pleased with the result that at the end of the session he offered to hire the young man, who became his Master of Ceremonies at the Big Show concerts. "Johnny High", as he then called himself, acted as the MC for all Gordon's shows in Sydney, Melbourne and Brisbane for the next 18 months. before returning to work in radio. Under his real name, John Highfield, he went on to a distinguished 35-year career as a journalist, foreign correspondent and presenter with ABC Radio, becoming the network's first International Editor, the inaugural host of its nightly current affairs show PM, and finally as co-host of Radio National's The World Today, before retiring in 2003.

=== Career decline and death, 1960–63 ===
Although Gordon made huge profits on some tours, others lost heavily, and, by the late 1950s, he was reportedly suffering from mental health and drug-related problems. He was overseas for much of 1958–59, leaving his company in the hands of his executive staff. He was eventually located when his mother contacted his company to inform them that Gordon had suffered a serious mental breakdown and was being cared for in a sanatorium in Hawaii – although whether or not either Gordon or his mother were telling the truth is entirely speculative and can probably now never be confirmed or refuted. Gordon returned to Australia in 1960 but by this time he was deeply in debt. He quickly sold Lee Gordon Records and the Leedon label to Festival Records, against the advice of business manager Alan Heffernan.

While claims of Gordon's connections with organized crime cannot be substantiated, there is some circumstantial evidence in the form of his various business dealings in the early 1960s with notorious Sydney career criminal Abe Saffron, the reputed kingpin of the Kings Cross vice scene. According to John Highfield, Saffron was Gordon's "paymaster", and on several occasions, when Gordon was broke, it was Saffron himself who paid the wages of the Big Show staff.

Saffron and Gordon's first collaboration was the conversion of a former cinema in Kings Cross into one of Australia's first discothèques, The Birdcage. After Gordon left Australia it was leased to promoter John Harrigan and renamed Surf City and it became a popular and influential venue in Sydney during the early days of the 'beat boom' in the early to mid-1960s, particularly associated with Sydney rock band Billy Thorpe & the Aztecs. Gordon and Saffron also opened the first drag club in Australia, the Jewel Box Revue Club in Darlinghurst. This venue launched the career of famous Australian drag queen Carlotta, and under its later owner Sammy Lee became the famous Les Girls. Gordon and Saffron's other major joint venture was another idea that proved to be somewhat ahead of its time for Australia – the first drive-in fast food restaurant in Sydney, the Big Boy hamburger bar on Parramatta Road at Taverners Hill in Sydney's inner west.

==== Lenny Bruce Tour ====
In January 1962, Gordon travelled to Acapulco, Mexico, where he married his de facto partner, Queensland-born dancer and model Arlene Topfer, with Frank Sinatra acting as his best man.

It is not known when the Gordon family returned to Australia (the couple already had a daughter, Lisa, by this time), but Lee was evidently back in Sydney by September that year. Low on funds (and reportedly heavily in debt to business "partner" Abe Saffron) Gordon was desperate to re-establish himself. Presumably through his "Rat Pack" connections in the United States, Gordon was able to promote what proved to be an ill-fated and controversial visit by legendary American comedian Lenny Bruce, who was booked to perform a two-week engagement of standup shows at Aaron's Exchange Hotel in Gresham St in Sydney's CBD. The support act for these shows was a local folk trio that included folk singer Tina Date and singer-guitarist Derek Strahan, who performed satirical folk-protest songs. According to Strahan, the duo secured the gig because Gordon had been a guest on a local TV chat show where Strahan's group had performed one of their songs.

Bruce's engagement began on 6 September and the first (9pm) show at Aaron's passed without incident, but Bruce's second show at 11pm caused a sensation. It was attended by a selection of celebrities, many of whom were there at Gordon's invitation, but who evidently had little knowledge of either Bruce or his style of humour. As the performance progressed, Bruce was randomly heckled, culminating in the now-infamous exchange between Bruce and actress Barbara Wyndon. She interrupted Bruce, standing up and complaining that all he was talking about was America, and exhorting him to say something different. In response, a clearly annoyed Bruce exclaimed, "F*** you, madam! That's different, isn't it?", and at this point several audience members – including prominent radio DJ Bob Rogers – reportedly walked out. The incident was front-page news the next day, with headlines like "SICK JOKE MADE AUDIENCE ILL" (accompanied by an obviously 'doctored' photo of Bruce apparently performing a fascist salute), "SICK COMIC'S SEX JOKES, WOMEN DISGUSTED", and "DISGUSTED BY 'SICK' JOKES, 4 WOMEN WALK OUT".

The remaining shows at Aaron's were immediately cancelled but, contrary to popular belief, Bruce was not officially 'banned' on censorship grounds, nor was he forced to leave Australia. However the financial arrangement between Gordon and Bruce became a major issue – Bruce was expecting an advance bond payment for the tour (which would cover cancellations), but the perennially cash-strapped Gordon was offering a profit-share arrangement, which meant there was no money. Students from the University of New South Wales and University of Sydney (including future Oz magazine editors Richard Neville and Martin Sharp) tried to support Bruce by organising shows at campus venues, but these were also cancelled by university authorities, as was a planned interview on ABC Television. Bruce also faced the challenge of supporting his well-known heroin habit – no mean feat in the full glare of the media spotlight in conservative Sydney in 1962 – and he unsurprisingly drew the attention of Sydney's Vice Squad. He remained holed up in his Kings Cross hotel, reportedly sleeping most of the day and mainly eating ice cream. However Bruce's local acquaintance, folk singer Tina Date, put him in contact with Sydney 'society' doctor Rocky Meyers, an associate of the left wing intellectual group the Sydney Push, and Meyers was able to provide prescription drugs for him.

Eight days later, a hastily arranged third performance was staged at the Wintergarden Theatre in Sydney's Rose Bay. Just 200 people attended (in a theatre with a capacity of 2100), including a large police presence, but in the event Bruce performed what was described as a 'subdued' show. It was long rumoured that an audio recording of this performance had been made by police, and remarkably, this tape eventually emerged, but according to Australian musician John Pochee OAM, the performance was in fact taped by a local jazz musician, Sid Powell, who brought a portable tape recorder to the show. The tape was rediscovered in 2011 in the possession of Australian singer "Little" Sammy Gaha, and was reportedly then donated to the Lenny Bruce audio collection at Brandeis University. Bruce left Australia after thirteen days and reportedly said little about the experience afterwards. Bruce's last years were dogged by scandal, financial struggle and drug problems. Bruce died at the age of 40 in 1966.

==== Departure from Australia and death ====
Gordon's only 1963 concert promotion was notable for several reasons – it was to be his last tour before his death, it featured only one major American act (Chubby Checker) and it was the first major Australian inter-city tour by the rising very young vocal group The Bee Gees.

The last few months of Gordon's life remain shrouded in mystery and controversy. In April and May 1963 The Sydney Morning Herald reported Gordon was facing bankruptcy charges, and that during a court hearing in May he testified that he had handled some £15 million over the course of his 25-year promotions career, but the bankruptcy petition against him was reportedly dismissed.

In Sydney in June 1963, Gordon was charged with attempting to obtain the drug pethidine without a prescription. He was released on bail after being charged but he evidently fled the country on 20 July, travelling first to the United States and then London. On 23 July, the Sydney Morning Herald reported that a warrant had been issued for Gordon's arrest after he had failed to appear in court on the drug charge; Gordon's wife Arlene reportedly left the country the same day with their baby daughter, Lisa.

Four months later, on 7 November 1963, Gordon was found dead in a hotel room in London, aged 40. According to a contemporary press report in the Canberra Times, Gordon disappeared from the London hotel where he was staying with his wife Arlene and their children and his body was found two days later in a small room in another hotel. The report also indicated that the news had reached Australia via Arlene Gordon, who had contacted the wife of Gordon's longtime business partner, Detroit-based promoter Arthur Schurgin, who was evidently in Sydney at the time.

The cause of Gordon's "mystery" death was reportedly investigated by Scotland Yard but was eventually found to have been a coronary occlusion, although some sources claim that Gordon's friends were skeptical of the official verdict. Lee Gordon was survived by his wife Arlene, and their daughter and son (who was born the following year). Arlene Gordon was reported to have said that her late husband had plans to open clubs in the UK.

== Influence on Australian music ==
In almost exactly ten years, Lee Gordon's combination of "style, ego and limitless enthusiasm" transformed the staid Australian entertainment scene, helped to lay the foundations of the modern Australian music industry, and showed that despite the distances and costs involved, it was possible to mount successful package tours featuring leading American performers. Gordon played a pivotal role in the emergence of a local rock'n'roll music scene in Australia, and his patronage was crucial in launching the career of Australia's first and biggest 'homegrown' rock'n'roll star, Johnny O'Keefe. Gordon also exerted a huge influence on the direction of Australian jazz and pop/rock music through his tour promotions. The many tours by American artists that he promoted during this period presented most of the biggest American jazz, pop and rock stars of the period at the height of their fame.

The various Big Show tours brought some 472 American performers to Australia. In most cases, it was the first time that any of the top-ranking American jazz, popular song and comedy artists had visited the country and these tours were enormously significant to the Australian music scene, especially in Gordon's adoptive home of Sydney. Except for a few visits during World War II (e.g. a restricted wartime tour by Artie Shaw), virtually none of the top names in American popular music had ever visited Australia before the Gordon tours, due to a combination of factors including distance, cost (compounded by Australia's punitive taxation laws of the time) and particularly because of a long-standing de facto ban on African-American performers.

Arguably the greatest social significance of Gordon's Big Show tours was that they unequivocally broke down this long-standing racial barrier, by presenting integrated bills that featured leading African-American jazz, pop, R&B and rock'n'roll artists performing alongside 'white' artists. This was a major breakthrough in Australia because, as jazz historian Andrew Bissett has noted, the selective government application of the White Australia Policy (spurred by ongoing pressure from the Australian Musicians' Union) had effectively prevented any African-American performers artists from touring Australia since the controversial deportation of the African-American jazz band Sonny Clay's Colored Idea in 1928. The fact that Gordon was almost single-handedly able to overcome decades of union and government discrimination is as remarkable as it is poorly documented.

== Big Show tours, 1954–1961 ==
Reference note: information about the Lee Gordon / Big Show tours is sourced from the database compiled by Michael De Looper (Big Three Productions 2014) and published on his "Australian Record Labels" website.

=== 1954 ===
- Ella Fitzgerald, Buddy Rich, Artie Shaw, Jerry Colonna (July 1954)
- Johnnie Ray with Peggy Ryan, Ray McDonald and Dave Barry, with Wally Norman's Swing Band (September 1954)
- Louis Armstrong and his Allstars and Velma Middleton, with Wally Norman's Swing Band (October–November 1954)
- The Andrews Sisters, Billy Daniels and The Spence Twins, with Wally Norman's Orchestra (December 1954)

=== 1955 ===
- Nat King Cole (1st Australian tour) with June Christy, Rowan & Martin, Judy Kelly, and Dennis Collinson's Orchestra (7–15 January 1955)
- Frank Sinatra (1st Australian tour) with Frank D'Amore, Lois Ray, Ann McCormack and Dennis Collinson's Orchestra (17–29 January 1955)
- Frankie Laine (1st Australian tour) with Leo De Lyon, The Clark Brothers, Jerri Adams and Dennis Collinson's Orchestra (9–23 February 1955)
- Johnnie Ray (2nd Australian tour) with Danny Crystal, The Clark Brothers, Helen O'Connor and Dennis Collinson's Orchestra (8–26 March 1955)
- Betty Hutton, with Morey Amsterdam, Bobby Brandt, Clark Dennis, Jack Regas, Herb Lurie & Revue and Dennis Collinson's Orchestra (6–27 May 1955)
- Bob Hope (1st Australian tour) with Clark Dennis Roberta Linn The Marenos and Australian Mannequin Parade (27 May – 6 June 1955)
- Abbott & Costello (1st Australian tour) with Anne McCormack Bobby Barber Eilieen O'Dare. Tonny Turner Norman Erskine The Bridge Sisters and Fred james (17–24 June 1955)

=== 1956 ===
- Nat King Cole Trio (2nd Australian tour) with Lillian Briggs, Marty Allen & Mitch Dewood and George Kirby (7–19 February 1956). This was the first Big Show tour to visit Perth, Western Australia where the concerts were staged at Subiaco Oval.
- Johnnie Ray (3rd Australian Tour) with Leo De Lyon, The Holly Sisters, Peg Leg Bates, Lola Dee (8–24 March 1956)
- Louis Armstrong Allstars (2nd Australian tour) with Gary Crosby, Peg-Leg Bates, Rose Hardaway, and Joe Martin (comedian) (5–23 April 1956)
- The "Record Star Parade" starring Stan Freberg, with Joe "Fingers" Carr, Don Cornell, Buddy Rich, The Nilsson Twins, The Tune Twisters, Joe Martin (comedian) (10–27 October 1956)
- Frankie Laine" (2nd Australian tour) with Eileen Barton, Buddy Rich, Joe "Fingers" Carr, Stan Freberg, Joe Martin and The Tune Twisters with Dennis Collinson's Orchestra (28 November – 11 December 1956)

=== 1957 ===
- Bill Haley & His Comets, The Platters, Freddie Bell and the Bellboys, LaVern Baker, Big Joe Turner (8–26 January 1957)
- "The Second Record Star Parade" with Guy Mitchell, Lionel Hampton Band, Stan Kenton Orchestra, Cathy Carr, Joe Martin and Dennis Collinson's Orchestra (11–27 April 1957)
- Johnnie Ray (4th Australian tour) with Graeme Bell's Skiffle Gang, Vic Sabrino, Joe Martin and Patricia Smith (16–21 September 1957)
- "The Big Show Presents Rock'n'Roll" with Little Richard, Eddie Cochran, Gene Vincent & the Blue Caps, Alis Lesley, Johnny O'Keefe & The Dee Jays (Newcastle) (Sydney) (1–13 October 1957)
- Nat King Cole Trio (3rd Australian tour) with Georgia Lee, Yolanda & Antonio Rodrigues, Joe Martin, The Gill Bros, Joe Jenkins (29 November – 5 December 1957)

=== 1958 ===
- Buddy Holly & The Crickets, Jerry Lee Lewis, Paul Anka, Jodie Sands, Johnny O'Keefe & The Dee Jays with Dennis Collinson's Orchestra (30 January – 5 February 1958)
- Liberace (27 February – 12 March 1958). This tour played in Sydney and Melbourne only. The first two Sydney concerts on 27–28 February were cancelled, and new concerts were arranged a week later. In Sydney, Liberace performed at the Trocadero in George St rather than Sydney Stadium.

=== 1959 ===
- "Parade of Stars" featuring Tommy Sands, Frankie Avalon, The Sharks, The Platters, Johnny Rebb (18–26 March 1959)
- Frank Sinatra (2nd Australian tour) with Stan Freberg, Red Norvo Quintet with the Tune Twisters, Eddie Baker and Diana Trask with the Tommy Tycho Orchestra (31 March – 4 April 1959)
- Johnny Cash (First Australian tour) & The Tennessee Two with Gene Vincent, The Playmates, Robin Luke, Frankie Sardo, Bobby Day, Col Joye & The Joy Boys (15–21 April 1959)
- Sammy Davis Jr (1st Australian tour) with Jerry Lee Lewis and his group, Diana Trask and The Australian Jazz Quintet with the Morty Stevens Orchestra (20–30 April 1959)
- The Everly Brothers, Sal Mineo, Tab Hunter, Col Joye & the Joy Boys, Johnny Rebb & the Rebels, The Delltones, Johnny Devlin, Johnny O'Keefe & the Dee Jays, Princess Rora (27 May – 3 June 1959)
- "Battle of the Big Beat" Show starring Lloyd Price (1st Australian tour) with Conway Twitty & His Group, The Kalin Twins, Linda Laurie, Johnny O'Keefe & The Dee Jays, Col Joye & The Joye Boys, Johnny Rebb & The Rebels, The Delltones, Dig Richards & The RJs and Johnny Devlin & The Devils (17–25 July). This tour also played in Newcastle, Hobart and Wollongong.

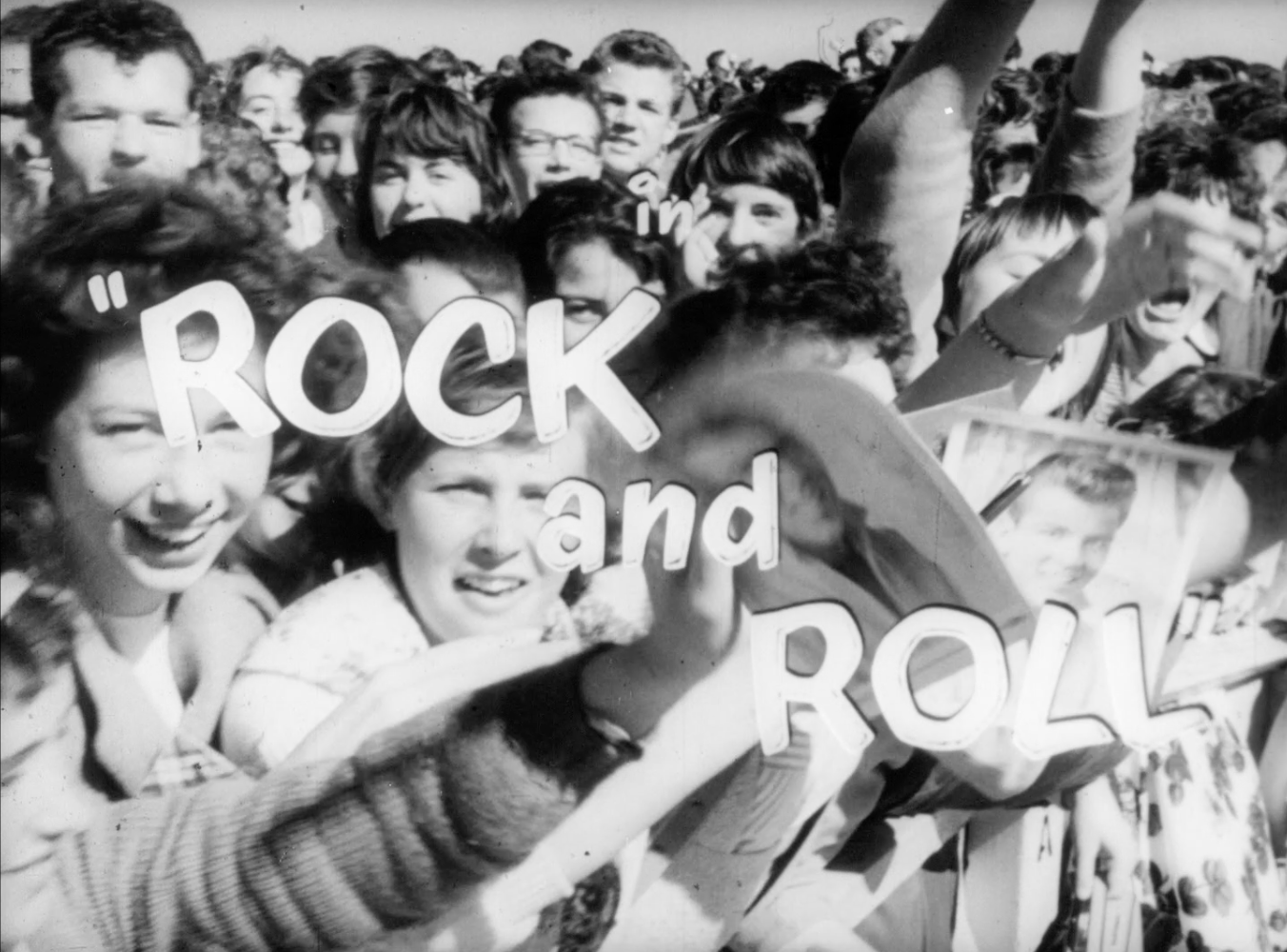
Starting credits for Gordon's 1959 film Rock 'n' Roll

- Fabian (1st Australian tour) with Johnny O'Keefe & The Dee Jays, Col Joye & The Joye Boys, Johnny Rebb & The Rebel and Johnny Devlin & The Devils (15–22 October 1959). It was made into a film (see section above). Additional local acts performed in each city:
  - Sydney – The Crescents, The Graduates, Warren Williams and Lonnie Lee & The Leemen
  - Melbourne – Frankie Davidson, Malcolm Arthur, Daryl Cashmore, The Moontones, Bill Owens and The Thunderbirds
  - Brisbane – The Planets.
- Sammy Davis Jr. (2nd Australian tour) (3–8 December)

=== 1960 ===
- "All American Rock Spectacular" featuring Duane Eddy & The Rebels, Johnny Restivo, Crash Craddock, The DiamondsRock'n'Roll, Floyd Robinson, Santo & Johnny Floyd Robsinon and JohnnY devlin & The Devils compered by Dig Richards (22–30 January 1960)
- "Parade of Stars Supershow" starring Rod Lauren, Tommy Sands, Jimmy Clanton, Johnny & The Hurricanes, Freddy Cannon, Dick Caruso, Chan Romero, Jack Scott, Jerry Lee Lewis, Mark Dinning and Johnny Preston, compered by Johnny O'Keefe (21–26 March 1960)
- The Everly Brothers, Crash Craddock, Bobby Rydell, Marv Johnson, The Champs, The Crickets, Lonnie Lee, compered by Johnny High (10–14 May 1960)
- Pat Boone (1st Australian tour) with The Diamonds, Dick Caruso and Diana Trask (27–30 July 1960)
- Harry Belafonte (1st Australian tour) with his singers and instrumentalists (13–27 August 1960). In Melbourne this tour played 8 concerts at the Palais Theatre St Kilda, rather than Festival Hall.
- "1st Annual Australian International Jazz Festival". This tour comprised a large selection of American and Australian jazz artists who were split into two touring groups that played concurrent dates in Sydney, Melbourne, Brisbane, and Adelaide 26–29 October 1960.
  - Group 1: Sarah Vaughan, Jonah Jones Quartet, Dizzy Gillespie, Al Hibbler, Bryce Rohde Quartet, Ray Price and The Port Jackson Jazz Band (Australian band)
  - Group 2: Dakota Staton, Gene McDaniels, Coleman Hawkins, Teddy Wilson Trio, Three-Out Trio (Mike Nock, Freddy Logan and Chris Karan), Ray Price & The Port Jackson Jazz Band

=== 1961 ===
- "All American Rock Spectacular" featuring Bobby Rydell, Brenda Lee, Duane Eddy & The Rebels, Chubby Checker, Oliver Cool (Tony Mordente) with Col Joye & The Joy Boys compered by Johnny High (24–29 January 1961)
- Connie Francis, Bobby Vee, Johnny Burnette, The Ventures, Donnie Brooks, with Col Joye and the Joy Boys (25–29 April 1961)
- Frank Sinatra with Timi Yuro (29 November – 2 December, Sydney only)

=== 1962 ===
- "Lee Gordon (on behalf of Perrin Productions) Presents The Twist" featuring Chubby Checker, Bobby Rydell, Del Shannon, Diane Hilton, The Peppermints, with Sabrina, compered by Johnny High (13–20 January 1961)
- Lenny Bruce (September 1962, Sydney only)

=== 1963 ===
- Lee Gordon Presents For David Blank Productions: Chubby Checker with Col Joye & The Joy Boys, Johnny Chester & The Chessmen, Judy Stone, Rob E.G., Warren Williams and The Bee Gees, plus Johnny O'Keefe (17–19 January 1963, Sydney only)
