= 1st Annual Australian International Jazz Festival =

Australian jazz festival held in 1960

Australian International Jazz Festival
- Genre: Jazz
- Dates: 26-29 October 1960
- Location: Australia
- Years active: 1
- Organised by: Lee Gordon

The 1st Annual Australian International Jazz Festival was a national jazz festival held in Australia during October 1960. It was presented by American promoter Lee Gordon as one of his Big Show tours, and featured international artists including Sarah Vaughan, Jonah Jones Quartet, Dizzy Gillespie, Al Hibbler, Dakota Staton, Gene Mcdaniels, Coleman Hawkins, and Teddy Wilson Trio, with Australian's Three Out Trio, and The Port Jackson Jazz Band.

== History ==
Ahead of the festival, American music magazine Billboard wrote about Australian newspapers being filled with stories about the announced jazz artist's upcoming appearances. Dates for the Melbourne shows were announced in The Age on September 8, with the international artists also said to be planning TV appearances during their short stay. They began to arrive in the last week of October, with ticket sales reported at the time to be "the heaviest ever".

Each show also had local bands, with Ray Price & The Port Jackson Jazz Band playing Sydney, The Swinging Graduates in Adelaide, and The Varsity Five for Brisbane. Dave Brubeck and Jimmy Rushing were both announced as playing Melbourne on October 27, but aren't mentioned in any reviews. Buddy Greco and The Dave Brubeck Trio were announced, but don't appear on the final lineup.

Australia's The Three Out Trio, made up of pianist Mike Nock, bassist Freddy Logan, and percussionist Chris Karan, had been playing at Lee Gordon's strip club Primitive when they were asked to join the festival. Nock later recalled the shows at Sydney Stadium had a revolving stage, and Coleman Hawkins needing to be helped off after becoming disoriented.

When Sarah Vaughan arrived in Sydney ahead of the festival, The Age reported she had come with a wardrobe worth £7500. After arriving, she rehearsed with pianist Roland Hannah at Sydney Stadium on Tuesday 25th, ahead of their first show the following night.

ABC radio broadcaster Eric Child hosted talks on the history of jazz before each set, and a scholarship was to be awarded to an Australian jazz musician to go overseas and gain experience. Sir Kenneth Street was a patron of the festival, though he told reporters he didn't really understand jazz, but was happy Gordon was attempting to bring real jazz artists to Australia.

The Sydney Morning Herald praised Ferguson's performance in Sydney. In their review they also highlighted The Bryce Rohde Quartet (made up of The Australian Jazz Quintet) who they said almost stole the show with their swinging improvisations. Following their own performance The Quartet joined Dizzy Gillespie, and were followed by Al Hibbler, Jonah Jones Quartet, and The Port Jackson Jazz Band. In their review of the second Sydney performance they highlighted Coleman Hawkins as the shows best.

The festival was recorded by ABC producer Joe Cramey, and were broadcast on the radio in 1961 as twelve 30 minute programs.

Lee Gordon lost heavily on the festival, and it was later revealed advance sales and door sales were both low, with the festival leaving Gordon £200,000 in debt. Although the festival was intended as an annual event, it didn't return.

== Lineup ==
Two lineups played alternate shows across Australia between Wednesday 26 October and Saturday 29.

A Company: Sarah Vaughan, Jonah Jones Quartet, Dizzy Gillespie, Al Hibbler, and The Bryce Rohde Quartet

- 26 Oct 1960 – Brisbane, Festival Hall
- 27 Oct 1960 – Adelaide, Memorial Drive
- 28 Oct 1960 – Sydney Stadium
- 29 Oct 1960 – Melbourne, Festival Hall

B Company: Dakota Staton, Gene Mcdaniels, Coleman Hawkins, Teddy Wilson Trio, and The Three-out Trio

- 26 Oct 1960 – Adelaide, Memorial Drive
- 27 Oct 1960 – Melbourne, Festival Hall
- 28 Oct 1960 – Brisbane, Festival Hall
- 29 Oct 1960 – Sydney Stadium
