= The Three Out =

1960s Australian jazz band

- Genre: Jazz
- Years active: 1960–1961
- Past members: Mike Nock, Chris Karan, Freddy Logan

The Three Out (sometimes written The 3-Out or The Three Out Trio) were an Australian jazz trio made up of Mike Nock, Chris Karan, and Freddy Logan. They released two albums before separating.

== History ==
Pianist Mike Nock was born in New Zealand but moved to Australia in 1958, and found work at Melbourne's The Embers restaurant where he began playing with Chris Karan. Karan was born in Australia and had been playing drums locally for some years before joining The Embers' house band when it opened in 1959. After The Embers briefly closed following a fire, Karan and Nock both relocated to Sydney.

Freddy Logan had been working in Sydney for several years, following his arrival in Australia in 1956. Born in the Netherlands, he had played bass in jazz bands across Europe, and in Australia was part of the highly successful Australian All Stars Jazz Band. After meeting Mike Nock and Chris Karan, they formed The Three Out and made a name for themselves at El Rocco, a jazz club in Sydney.

The trio appeared on national TV, and lines formed around the block to see them play live. They performed four nights a week at El Rocco which became the centre of Sydney's jazz activity.

After only six weeks of playing together, in September 1960 the trio began recording their debut album Move, which was released in 1961.

They were picked by Lee Gordon to perform at his 1st Annual Australian International Jazz Festival, which toured nationally, and then recorded a second album Sittin' In in May 1961. Released later that year, the album included Don Burrows and other guests.

After Mike Nock received a scholarship at Boston's Berklee School of Music the band left Australia. In June 1961 The Three Out arrived in England to play some dates, with Nock then leaving the trio to travel on to Boston. In the US, Nock led The Fourth Way, while Chris Karan and Freddy Logan remained in Europe, with Karan joining Dudley Moore's trio, and Logan joining Tubby Hayes' band.

In 2015 both Three Out albums were reissued by German jazz label BE! Jazz Records. Select tracks were also included on a CD compilation by the Australian Jazz Museum.

== Discography ==
=== Albums ===
Title	Details
Move	Released: 1961; Format: LP; Label: Columbia
Sittin' In	Released: 1961; Format: LP; Label: Columbia

== Further readings ==
Gaunt, James (2026). The Three Out's Move (1 ed.). Bloomsbury Publishing Inc. doi:10.5040/9798765123003 ISBN 979-8-7651-2300-3.
