= Lucille Power =

Australian actor

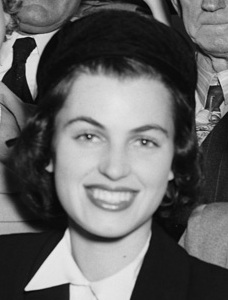
- Lucille Power May 1952
- Other name: Lucille Loggen
- Partner: Freddy Logan

Lucille Power was an Australian model and actress.

== Career ==
Lucille Power attended Sydney Church of England Girls' Grammar School, Darlinghurst.

After leaving school, Power studied art, business, drama, and modelling. She modelled for a fashion company in Sydney where she worked as a clothes designer. She also appeared in Pix magazine, and was featured on the cover of several issues. In 1949, she entered Pix's beauty contest Pacific Neptune's Daughter.

In 1950, Power was a candidate for Miss Australia. She won the title of Miss Lane Cove as part of the quest to nominate Miss Australia that year.

Power joined the cast of Ladies' Night in a Turkish Bath when it opened in Adelaide in November 1950. The cast, including Power, then took the show to New Zealand in December. They then toured Australia through 1951.

She left Australia for Europe in 1952. She appeared in films in England, a water ballet Niagara Follies in Italy and Spain, danced in France and Belgium, and modelled in the Netherlands. In 1954, Power was said to have appeared in ten films in England. This included a role as a "harem girl" in The Belles of St. Trinian's, filmed at Shepparton, Middlesex and released in 1954. Other roles included parts in The Master of Ballantrae, and As Long as They're Happy. She also continued modelling, and was a runnerup in Miss Cinerama 1954.

While in the Netherlands, she met Dutch jazz musician Freddy Logan. She joined his band as a singer when they toured West Germany. The two were married in October 1953 in Amsterdam and relocated to England. In 1956, they had a son John F. Loggen and visited Australia see Power's family. They had intended to then continue on to America where Power would pursue her acting career, however Freddy Logan decided to stay in Australia.

== Filmography ==
- The Master of Ballantrae (1953)
- The Belles of St. Trinian's (1954)
- As Long as They're Happy (1955)
