= Mairzy Doats =

1943 American novelty song

Song
- Published: 1943 by Miller Music Publishing Co.
- Genre: Novelty
- Songwriters: Milton Drake; Al Hoffman; Jerry Livingston
- Composers: Milton Drake, Al Hoffman, Jerry Livingston

Official audio
- "Mairzy Doats" on YouTube

"Mairzy Doats" is a novelty song written and composed in 1943 by Milton Drake, Al Hoffman, and Jerry Livingston. Inspired by the "infant prattle" Drake's daughter made, it contains lyrics that make no sense as written, but are near homophones of meaningful phrases. The song's title, for example, is a homophone of "Mares eat oats".

The song was first played on radio station WOR, New York, by Al Trace and his Silly Symphonists. It made the pop charts several times, with a version by the Merry Macs reaching No. 1 in March 1944. The song was also a number-one sheet music seller, with sales of over 450,000 within the first three weeks of release. The Merry Macs recording was Decca Records' best-selling release in 1944. Twenty-three other performers followed up with their own recordings in a span of only two weeks that year.

== Meaning ==
The song's refrain, as written on the sheet music, seems meaningless:

Mairzy doats and dozy doats and liddle lamzy divey
A kiddley divey too, wouldn't you?

However, the lyrics of the bridge provide an explanation:

If the words sound queer and funny to your ear, a little bit jumbled and jivey,
Sing "Mares eat oats and does eat oats and little lambs eat ivy."

This hint allows the ear to translate the final line as "a kid'll eat ivy, too; wouldn't you?"

Milton Drake, one of the writers, said the song had been based on an English nursery rhyme. According to this story, Drake's four-year-old daughter came home singing, "Cowzy tweet and sowzy tweet and liddle sharksy doisters." (Cows eat wheat and sows eat wheat and little sharks eat oysters.)

Drake joined Hoffman and Livingston to come up with a tune for the new version of the rhyme, but for a year no one was willing to publish a "silly song". Finally, Hoffman pitched it to his friend Al Trace, bandleader of the Silly Symphonists. Trace liked the song and recorded it. It became a huge hit, most notably with the Merry Macs' 1944 recording.

== Origins ==
The scholars Iona and Peter Opie have noted that the last two lines of the song appear in an old catch which, when said quickly, appears to be in Latin:

In fir tar is,
In oak none is,
In mud eels are,
In clay none are,
Goat eat ivy,
Mare eat oats.

They trace the origin of the joke to a manuscript of about 1450 which has "Is gote eate yvy? Mare eate ootys".

== Other recordings and performances ==
- The song was performed by Bob Hope and Bing Crosby at WWII USO performances.
- The song was used as a running gag by Laurel and Hardy in their 1944 film The Big Noise.
- In 1958, New Orleans R&B singer Tommy Ridgley released a rock and roll version on the Herald Records label.
- In 1959, Dodie Stevens released the song as her first recording under Dot Records.
- Also in 1959, The Mark IV released their version as a 7" single on Mercury Records.
- Additionally in 1959, The Three Stooges included a cover of the song in their album The Nonsense Songbook.
- Bing Crosby included the song in a medley on his 1959 album Join Bing and Sing Along.
- Spike Jones was among several other artists who covered it, substituting sound effects for the "food" words.
- In 1963, a version of "Mairzy Doats" was recorded by Carlo Mastrangelo of the Belmonts and released by Laurie Records.
- Also in 1963, Bobby Darin performed the song on his daily five-minute radio show. This version was released in 2014 on the CD The Milk Shows.
- In 1964, Burl Ives recorded the song for Walt Disney Records on the album Chim Chim Cheree.
- Dickie Rock also recorded the song, with The Miami Showband in 1967. This was the B-side of their hit “Baby I’m Your Man”, which were both released on Pye Records.
- The song received a minor revival in 1967, when it was recorded by The Innocence, who took it to Number 75 on the Pop Top 100 on Kama Sutra Records.
- Canadian children's singer Fred Penner recorded it as part of his 1990 album, Fred Penner's Place.
- The song was sung by Leland Palmer (Ray Wise) in the second season of the television series Twin Peaks.
- Experimental band Xiu Xiu used lyrics from the song on their 2016 album Plays the Music of Twin Peaks.

== See also ==
- Mondegreen
- Folklore
- Oral tradition
