= Ondas (album) =

Studio album by Mike Nock
- Released: 1982
- Recorded: November 1981
- Studio: Talent Studios; Oslo, Norway
- Genre: Jazz
- Length: 50:53
- Label: ECM 1220
- Producer: Manfred Eicher

Mike Nock chronology
Succubus (1980)	Ondas (1982)	Strata (1983)

Ondas is an album by New Zealand jazz pianist and composer Mike Nock recorded in November 1981 and released on ECM the following year. The trio features rhythm section Eddie Gómez and Jon Christensen.

== Reception ==
The AllMusic review by Thom Jurek awarded the album 4½ stars calling it "a glorious recording by a crack batch of musicians. It is also a stellar example of what Manfred Eicher's label and production offer to the world."

Professional ratings
Review scores
Source	Rating
Allmusic	4.5/5 stars

== Track listing ==
All compositions by Mike Nock

1. "Forgotten Love" - 16:00
2. "Ondas" - 9:11
3. "Visionary" - 11:37
4. "Land of the Long White Cloud" - 7:58
5. "Doors" - 6:24

== Personnel ==
- Mike Nock – piano, percussion
- Eddie Gómez – bass
- Jon Christensen – drums
