= Freddy Logan =

Dutch jazz double bassist

- Born: Frederick Christian Loggen; 8 April 1930; Amsterdam, Netherlands
- Died: May 2003 (aged 73) Cambridgeshire, England
- Genres: Jazz
- Instruments: Double bass
- Years active: 1948–1984
- Formerly of: The Australian All-Stars, The Loganberries, The 3 Out, Tubby Hayes Quartet
- Spouses: Lucille Power (m. 1953) Catherine Kelly (m. 1984)

Frederick "Freddy" Logan (born Frederick Christian Loggen; 8 April 1930 – May 2003) was a Jazz musician who played the double bass.

== Career ==
Freddy Logan performing with Pia Beck at Bop House, England (1950)

After learning bass during his teens, Freddy Logan became a professional musician in 1948, playing in local bands until he joined the Pia Beck Trio in 1949. The trio toured England and the Netherlands before Logan left the group.

Logan returned to England in 1953 to study at Guildhall School of Music, and continued playing jazz in London where he worked with Kenny Graham, Harry Klein and Derek Smith. In 1956 he moved to Sydney, Australia, where he hosted his own radio program Jazz For Pleasure and started the Jazz II club. After winning a readers poll in Music Maker magazine, Logan was among a group given studio recording time, and he recorded his first album recorded in Australia as part of the Music Maker 1957 All Stars. Members of the group went onto form and record as The Australian All-Stars, who appeared on TV and released their debut album in 1960.

He formed The Three Out trio with Mike Nock and Chris Karan in 1960, who released two albums Move (1961) and Sittin’ In (1961) and performed with international acts at the 1st Annual Australian International Jazz Festival. After Nock received a scholarship to the USA, The 3-Out briefly toured New Zealand and parts of Europe before breaking up.

Logan remained in England and played with Tubby Hayes until 1965, both in his big band and in his quintet. He also appeared with Hayes on television shows and series such as BBC Show of the Week, Something Special and The Cool of the Evening. In the field of jazz he was involved in 56 recording sessions between 1954 and 1966, in addition to those with Stan Tracey, Tommy Whittle, Graeme Bell, Johnny Ashcroft, Don Burrows, Johnny Keating, Blossom Dearie, Jimmy Witherspoon, Dakota Staton, and Kenny Clare.

After receiving a British passport during the 1960s, Freddy Logan married Catherine Kelly in 1984. They lived in Cambridgeshire until his death in May 2003. He had previously married Australian actress Lucille Power in 1953.

== Discography ==
=== Singles ===
Title	Details
Pia's Boogie / Yes Sir, That's My Baby	Artist: The Pia Beck Trio; Released: 1950; Format: 10-inch Single; Label: Decca
The Continental / Blues In The Night	Artist: Kenny Graham's Afro-Cubists; Released: 1954; Format: 10-inch Single; Label: Esquire
Jeff Kruger's Jazz At The Flamingo Vol 2	Artist: The Derek Smith Trio; Released: 1955; Format: 7-inch EP; Label: Decca
Nurseryplant	Artist: The Loganberries; Released: 1958; Format: 7-inch; Label: Columbia
I Ain't Gonna Do It	Artist: The Loganberries; Released: 1958; Format: 7-inch; Label: Columbia

=== Albums ===
Title	Details
Jazz In Australia Volume 5	Artist: Music Maker 1957 All Stars; Released: 1957; Format: 10-inch LP; Label: Parlophone
Jazz For Beach-niks	Artist: The Australian All-Stars; Released: 1960; Format: LP; Label: Columbia
Jazz For Beach-niks Volume 2	Artist: The Australian All-Stars; Released: 1960; Format: LP; Label: Columbia
Move	Artist: The Three Out; Released: 1961; Format: LP; Label: Columbia
Sittin' In	Artist: The Three Out; Released: 1961; Format: LP; Label: Columbia
Swing Revisited	Artist: Johnny Keating & His Band; Released: 1963; Format: LP; Label: Decca
Vic Lewis Plays Bossa Nova At Home And Away	Artist: Vic Lewis And His Bossa Nova All Stars; Released: 1963; Format: LP; Label: His Master's Voice
Late Spot At Scott's	Artist: The Tubby Hayes Quintet; Released: 1963; Format: LP; Label: Fontana
Down In The Village	Artist: The Tubby Hayes Quintet; Released: 1964; Format: LP; Label: Fontana
Tubbs' Tours	Artist: The Tubby Hayes Orchestra; Released: 1964; Format: LP; Label: Fontana
Dakota '67	Artist: Dakota Staton; Released: 1967; Format: LP; Label: Columbia
Isn't This Where We Came In?	Artist: Lionel Bart; Released: 1968; Format: LP; Label: Deram
