= The Mark IV =

American pop vocal group

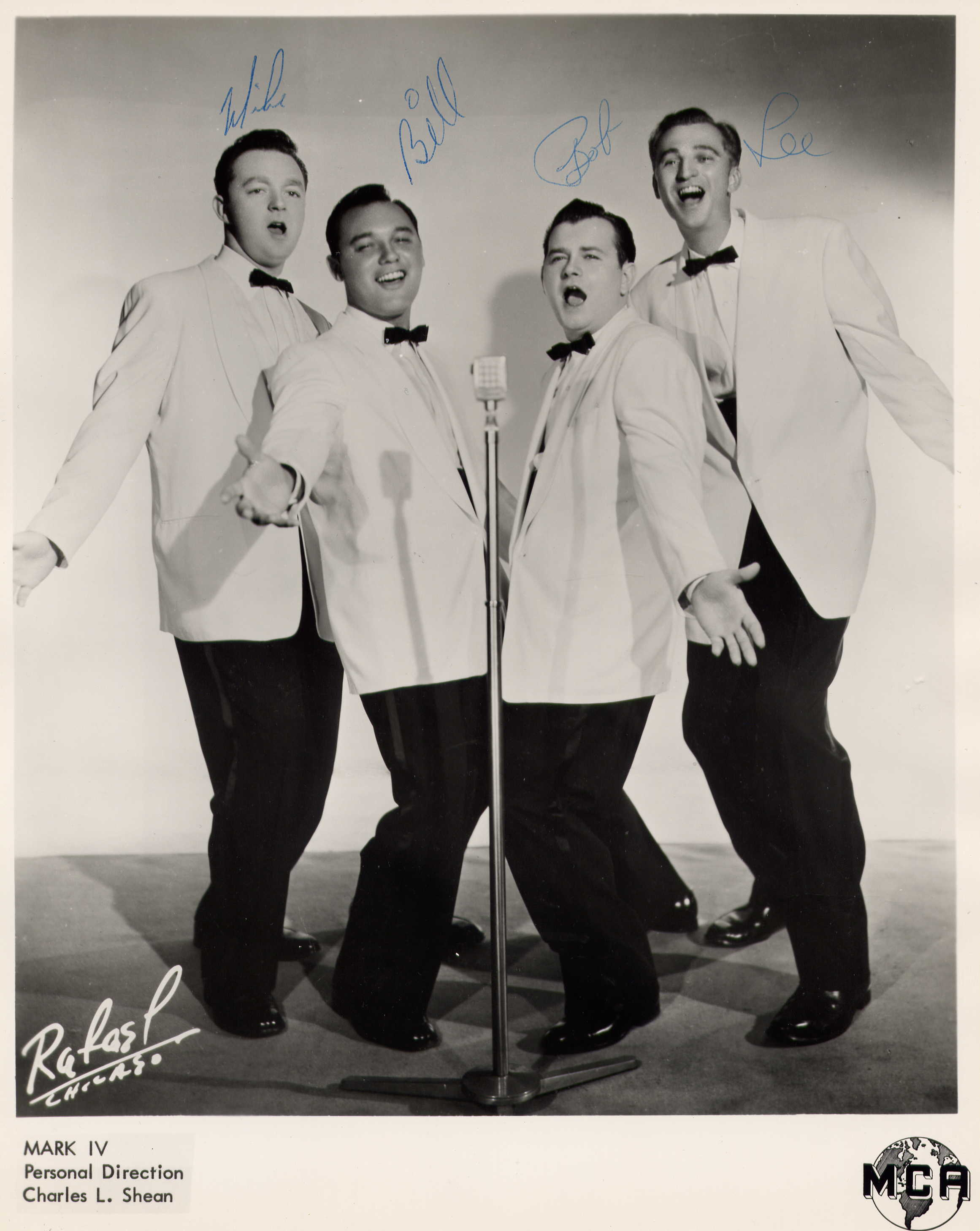

The Mark IV were an American musical ensemble, based in Chicago, consisting of Bob Peterson, Leon McGeary, William (Bill) Thomas, and Michael McCarthy. They were originally named The Rhythm Makers. They later changed their name to Mark V, and then – as members left – to The Mark IV, and eventually ending in the 1980s as The Mark IV Trio. The band appears to have recorded only as The Mark IV, however, and they had their biggest hit in 1959 with the novelty song, "I Got a Wife" (Mercury 71403). "I Got a Wife" was set to a lively polka beat, and reached No. 24 in US Billboard Hot 100 chart, and No. 14 on Canadian radio station CHUM's "Chum Chart". The song was later covered by Frankie Yankovic and other polka bands.

== Early success ==
The B-side of "I Got a Wife" was "Ah-Ooo-Gah", a straight 1950s rocker, punctuated with an old-time car horn effect.

Prior to "I Got a Wife," the group released at least two singles on Cosmic Records. One of these was "Goose Bumps" b/w "Booblee Ah Bah Doo Baa" (Cosmic 702; 1957), recorded along with the Dick Marx Orchestra. Though both songs on this record fit the category of doo-wop, the nonsense title of the B-side suggests the "novelty" direction the group would later take.

The other known Cosmic release was "(Make with) The Shake" b/w "45 R.P.M." (Cosmic 704; 1958). The group performed "(Make With) The Shake" on American Bandstand, and Dick Clark currently owns the rights to the song. Both songs were also released in Canada on the REO label (REO 8217). "(Make With) The Shake" was in a vein rather similar to Danny and the Juniors' "At the Hop", and it charted No. 22 on the Canadian "Chum Chart".

== Later years ==
After the success of "I Got a Wife," Mercury quickly followed up with several more Mark IV novelty singles. One of these was "Move Over Rover" b/w "Dante's Inferno" (Mercury 71445; 1959). Another was "Mairzy Doats" b/w "Ring Ring Ring Those Bells" (Mercury 71481; 1959).

Songwriting for all of these songs, except "Mairzy Doats," is credited to Edward C. Mascari and Erwin Herbert "Dutch" Wenzlaff. Mascari and Wenzlaff were sheet music salesmen before they started writing and performing together. Wenslaff played drums, and Mascari the piano.

At some point, Mascari – it seems – ran his own Chicago-based, Delaware record label, and was also once general manager of Mercury's Near North Music Publishing. Additionally, according to Chicago Soul by Robert Pruter, Mascari at one point ran (other sources say "owned"), a soul label named Limelight; perhaps a Mercury sub-label. Mascari is also credited by one source as having produced a single titled "Cindy, Oh Cindy" for Ivanhoe Records. Yet another lists him as producer of a United Artist's record by Danny Lee (a.k.a. Dan Penn). He also co-produced an album by singer-songwriter Dick Campbell, on which Peter Cetera, Paul Butterfield, and Mike Bloomfield were all credited.

Wenzlaff, too, appears to have had an association with Mercury (as a record producer) at some point. Additionally, he and Mascari wrote and produced songs for other artists, including "Foggy Mountain" for Danielle Blanchard, "Stop, Look and Listen" for Ralph Marterie and his Marlboro Men, and "Bride and Groom" (sheet music for which can often be found on eBay). Additionally, Wenzlaff is credited with having arranged and conducted "You Wouldn't Listen" for The Ides of March on Harlequin Records in 1966.

== Discography ==
- "Goose Bumps" b/w "Booblee Ah Bah Doo Baa" (Cosmic 702; 1957; US) – (as The Mark IV / Dick Marx Orchestra)
- "(Make with) The Shake" b/w "45 R.P.M" – (Cosmic 704; 1958; US) (REO 8217; 1958; Canada)
- "I Got a Wife" b/w "Ah-Ooo-Gah" – (Mercury 71403; 1959; US)
- "Move Over Rover" b/w "Dante's Inferno – (Mercury 71445; 1959; US)
- "Mairzy Doats" b/w "Ring Ring Ring Those Bells" – (Mercury 71481; 1959; US)

NB: In addition to Wenzlaff and Mascari's group, there have been several other groups named The Mark IV (also Mark IV, without the "The"). The one most often confused with Wenzlaff and Mascari's group (due to their also having released records on Mercury) was a soul group out of New York City. Their singles included "Honey I Still Love You" b/w "Since God Made Woman (Nobody Rest)", "My Everything You Are" b/w "I'll Be Right There (To Make Love to You)", "I Fell In Love (With a Married Woman)" b/w "Got to Get Back (To My Baby's Love)", and "Why Do You Want to Hurt Me" b/w "You're Just Like a Dream".
