= The Fourth Way (band) =

American jazz quartet

The Fourth Way was an American jazz quartet, comprising Eddie Marshall, Mike Nock, Michael White, and Ron McClure. They formed in 1967 and worked primarily in the San Francisco Bay Area through the early 1970s, releasing three albums. Like their contemporaries Weather Report, they were early pioneers of electric jazz fusion, with Nock's Fender Rhodes piano run through many effects pedals including ring modulation, Michael White's electrically amplified violin, and Ron McClure's electric bass.

Their second album, The Fourth Way, released in 1969 includes: Ron McClure on acoustic bass, amplified acoustic bass and electric bass, Mike Nock on piano and electric piano, Michael White on acoustic violin and amplified acoustic violin and Eddie Marshall on drums. All selections composed by Mike Nock except one which was composed by Michael White. Produced by John Palladino and engineered by Joe Polito and Jay Ranellucci.

== Discography ==
- The Sun And Moon Have Come Together (Harvest Records, 1968)
- The Fourth Way (Capitol Records, 1969)
- Werwolf (Harvest, 1970) recorded live at the 1970 Montreux Jazz Festival
