= Mike Nock =

New Zealand jazz pianist (born 1940)

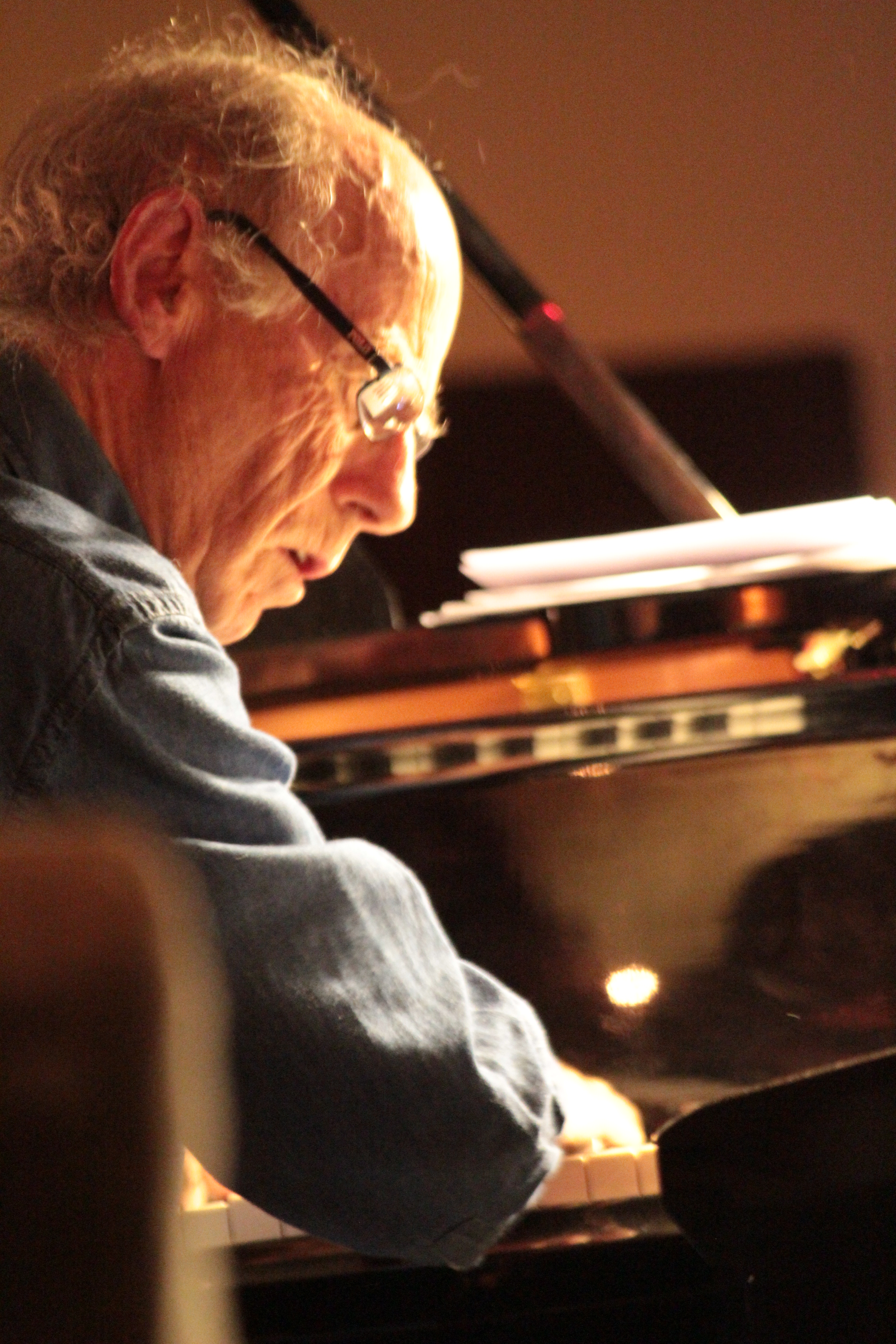
- Mike Nock in 2012 by Andrew Lorien

Background information
- Born: 27 September 1940 (age 86); Christchurch, New Zealand
- Genre: Jazz
- Occupations: Musician, composer, arranger
- Instruments: Piano, keyboards
- Website: mikenock.com

Michael Anthony Nock ONZM (born 27 September 1940) is a New Zealand jazz pianist, who lives and works in Australia.

== Biography ==
Nock was born in Christchurch, New Zealand, but spent his childhood in Ngāruawāhia. Nock began studying piano at 11. He attended Nelson College for one term in 1955. By the age of 18, he was performing in Australia. In Sydney he played in The Three Out trio with Freddy Logan and Chris Karan who toured England in 1961 before Nock left to attend Berklee College of Music. He was a member of Yusef Lateef's group from 1963 to 1965.

In 1965-1966 Nock joined Art Blakey and The Jazz Messengers, replacing Keith Jarrett.

During 1968–1970, Nock was involved with fusion, leading the Fourth Way band. From 1975 to 1985 he was a studio musician in New York after which he returned to Australia.

In 1987 the Best Jazz Album in the New Zealand Music Awards was Nock's Open Door with drummer Frank Gibson, Jr.

In the 2003 New Year Honours, Nock was appointed an Officer of the New Zealand Order of Merit, for services to jazz. In 2024, he was entered into the New Zealand Music Hall of Fame.

He lives in New South Wales where he taught at the Sydney Conservatorium of Music until 2018 and performs with his trio, big band, and various one-off ensembles.

== Discography ==
=== Albums ===
List of albums, with selected details
Title	Details
Between or Beyond (as The Mike Nock Underground)	Released: 1971; Format: LP; Label: MPS Records (MPS 15 261 ST)
Almanac (with Almanac: Nock, Bennie Maupin, Cecil McBee, Eddie Marshall)	Released: 1977; Format: LP; Label: Improvising Artists
Magic Mansions	Released: 1977; Format: LP; Label: Laurie Records (LES-6001)
In, Out and Around (as Mike Nock Quartet)	Released: 1978; Format: LP; Label: Timeless (SJP 119)
The Opal Heart (David Liebman Quartet featuring Mike Nock)	Released: 1978; Format: LP; Label: Enja (3065)
Talisman / Solo	Released: 1978; Format: LP; Label: Enja (3071)
Climbing	Released: 1979; Format: LP; Label: Tomato (2696501)
Succubus	Released: 1980; Format: LP; Label: Sutra Records (SUS 1005)
Piano Solos	Released: 1980; Format: LP; Label: Timeless (SJP 134)
Ondas	Released: 1981; Format: LP; Label: ECM Records (ECM 1220)
Strata	Released: 1984; Format: LP, Cassette; Label: Kiwi (SLC-179)
Strata	Released: 1984; Format: LP, Cassette; Label: Kiwi (SLC-179)
Open Door (with Frank Gibson, Jr.)	Released: 1986; Format: LP, Cassette; Label: Ode Records (SODET 260)
Beautiful Friendship (as Mike Nock Too)	Released: 1989; Format: CD, LP, Cassette; Label: Ode Recorde
Dark and Curious (as Mike Nock Quartet)	Released: 1990; Format: CD, LP, Cassette; Label: ABC Records (846873-2)
Touch	Released: 1993; Format: CD; Label: Birdland (BL 001)
Temple (with Cameron Undy)	Released: 1996; Format: CD; Label: Dancing Laughing Records (DLR 001)
Not We But One (as Mike Nock Trio)	Released: 1997; Format: CD; Label: Naxos Jazz (86006-2)
Ozboppin' (as Mike Nock Quintet)	Released: July 1998; Format: CD; Label: Naxos Jazz (86019-2)
The Waiting Game (with Marty Ehrlich)	Released: 2000; Format: CD; Label: Naxos Jazz (86048-2)
Everybody Wants to Go to Heaven (as New York Jazz Collective with Marty Ehrlich, James Zollar, Ray Anderson, Mike Formanek & Pheeroan Aklaff)	Released: 2001; Format: CD; Label: Naxos Jazz (86073-2)
Changing Seasons (with Brett Hirst & Toby Hall)	Released: 2002; Format: CD; Label: DIW (DIW-628)
Live (as Mike Nock's Big Small Band)	Released: 2003; Format: CD; Label: ABC Jazz (981567-6)
Duologue (with Dave Liebman)	Released: 2007; Format: CD; Label: Birdland Records (BL 009); note: Recorded live in 2004
Meeting of the Waters (as The Mike Nock Project)	Released: December 2007; Format: CD; Label: Jazzhead (Head086)
Andrew Klippel Compositions 1980-1983 (as Mike Nock Trio)	Released: 2008; Format: CD (limited); Label: Andrew Klippel Productions (AKP0001)
An Accumulation of Subtleties (as Mike Nock Trio)	Released: 2010; Format: 2×CD; Label: FWM Records (FWM001)
Transformations (with Colin Hemmingsen & Nick Tipping)	Released: 5 December 2011; Format: Digital; Label: Colin Hemmingsen; Recorded in 2010
Hear and Know (as Mike Nock Trio)	Released: December 2011; Format: CD, Digital; Label: FWM Records (FWM002)
Sketches	Released: December 2011; Format: CD, Digital; Label: Ode Records (CDMANU5130)
Kindred (with Laurence Pike)	Released: 2012; Format: CD, Digital; Label: FWM Records (FWM003)
Opal Dream (with Howie Smith)	Released: 2012; Format: CD, Digital; Label: Open Blue (OBCD-1201)
Suite SIMA (as Mike Nock Octet)	Released: September 2014; Format: CD, Digital; Label: FWM Records (FWM004)
Two Out (with Roger Manins)	Released: May 2015; Format: CD, Digital; Label: FWM Records (FWM005)
The Monash Sessions (with Tony Gould)	Released: September 2015; Format: CD, Digital; Label: Jazzhead (HEAD218)
Beginning and End of Knowing (with Laurence Pike)	Released: October 2015; Format: CD, LP, Digital; Label: FWM Records (FWM006)
Vicissitudes (as Mike Nock Trio with NZTrio)	Released: 2016; Format: CD, Digital; Label: Rattle Records (RAT-D065)
This World (with Hamish Stuart, Julien Wilson & Jonathan Zwartz)	Released: October 2019; Format: CD, Digital; Label: Lionsharecords (LSR20196)
Another Dance (with Hamish Stuart, Julien Wilson & Jonathan Zwartz)	Released: January 2022; Format: CD, Digital; Label: Lionsharecords (LSR20212)
Hearing	Released: July 2023; Format:CD, digital; Label: ABC

== Awards ==
=== New Zealand Music Hall of Fame ===
Noteworthy New Zealand musicians are inducted into the New Zealand Music Hall of Fame.

Year	Nominee / work	Award	Result	Ref.
2024	Mike Nock	New Zealand Music Hall of Fame	inducted	

=== AIR Awards ===
The Australian Independent Record Awards (commonly known informally as AIR Awards) is an annual awards night to recognise, promote and celebrate the success of Australia's Independent Music sector.

Year	Nominee / work	Award	Result
2012	Hear and Now	Best Independent Jazz Album	Won
2015	Suite Sima	Best Independent Jazz Album	Nominated
2020	This World	Best Independent Jazz Album or EP	Nominated
2024	Hearing	Best Independent Jazz Album or EP	Nominated

=== ARIA Music Awards ===
The ARIA Music Awards are annual awards, which recognises excellence, innovation, and achievement across all genres of Australian music.

Year	Nominee / work	Award	Result	Ref.
1992	Dark & Curious	Best Jazz Album	Nominated	
1994	Touch	Best Jazz Album	Nominated	
2000	The Waiting Game (with Marty Ehrlich)	Best Jazz Album	Nominated	
2004	Big Small Band Live	Best Jazz Album	Nominated	
2007	Duologue (with Dave Liebman)	Best Jazz Album	Won	
2008	Meeting Of The Waters	Best Jazz Album	Nominated	
2020	This World (with Hamish Stuart, Julien Wilson & Jonathan Zwartz)	Best Jazz Album	Nominated	
2022	Another Dance (with Hamish Stuart, Julien Wilson & Jonathan Zwartz )	Best Jazz Album	Nominated	
2023	Hearing	Best Jazz Album	Nominated	

=== Australian Jazz Bell Awards ===
The Australian Jazz Bell Awards, (also known as the Bell Awards or The Bells), are annual music awards for the jazz music genre in Australia. They commenced in 2003.

Year	Nominee / work	Award	Result(wins only)
2004	Big Small Band Live – Mike Nock	Best Australian Contemporary Jazz Album	Won
2009	Mike Nock	Hall of Fame	inducted
2011	An Accumulation of Subtleties – Mike Nock Trio	Best Australian Contemporary Jazz Album	Won
2015	Suite Sima – Mike Nock Octet	Best Australian Jazz Ensemble	Won
2016	Beginning and End of Knowing – Mike Nock & Laurence Pike	Best Produced Album	Won

=== Don Banks Music Award ===
The Don Banks Music Award was established in 1984 to publicly honour a senior artist of high distinction who has made an outstanding and sustained contribution to music in Australia. It was founded by the Australia Council in honour of Don Banks, Australian composer, performer and the first chair of its music board.

Year	Nominee / work	Award	Result
2014	Mike Nock	Don Banks Music Award	awarded

=== Mo Awards ===
The Australian Entertainment Mo Awards (commonly known informally as the Mo Awards), were annual Australian entertainment industry awards. They recognise achievements in live entertainment in Australia from 1975 to 2016.

Year	Nominee / work	Award	Result (wins only)
1990	Mike Nock Quartet	Jazz Group of the Year	Won

=== Music Victoria Awards ===
The Music Victoria Awards are an annual awards night celebrating Victorian music. They commenced in 2006.

Year	Nominee / work	Award	Result	Ref.
2016	Monash Sessions (with Tony Gould)	Best Jazz Album	Nominated	
