= Chris Karan =

Australian jazz drummer and percussionist (born 1939)

- Born: Chrisostomos Karanikis; October 14, 1939 (age 86); Melbourne, Victoria, Australia
- Genres: jazz
- Instrument: percussion. drums
- Formerly of: The Three Out, Dudley Moore Trio, Roy Budd Trio
- Website: chriskaran.com

Chris Karan (born Chrisostomos Karanikis, 14 October 1939) is a Britain-based Australian jazz drummer and percussionist of Greek descent.

== Life and career ==
Karan was born in 1939 in Melbourne, Victoria, Australia.

Karan played in the Three Out trio with Mike Nock and Freddy Logan in Sydney in the early 1960s.

After moving to London in 1962, Karan became the drummer in the Dudley Moore Trio; he toured and recorded with Moore for many years, including the trio's appearances on the TV series Not Only But Also and the soundtrack of the 1967 movie Bedazzled. Their association continued until Moore's last major public appearance at Carnegie Hall in New York City in 2001. With Roy Budd he was a member of the Roy Love Trio and performed on the Get Carter soundtrack.

Karan has worked with the Yardbirds, Michel Legrand, Lalo Schifrin, Charles Aznavour, Stanley Myers, Basil Kirchin, Tony Hatch, Jackie Trent, Quincy Jones, Herbie Hancock, Jerry Goldsmith, Jerry Fielding, Pat Williams, André Previn, Richard Rodney Bennett, Barry Tuckwell, Carl Davis, Henry Mancini, the Beatles, the Seekers and Roy Budd. He toured with John Dankworth and Cleo Laine, the Bee Gees, Caterina Valente, Dusty Springfield, Lulu and the Swingle Singers. He was a member of the Harry Stoneham group, which provided the musical backing for the Michael Parkinson shows on BBC-TV.

He has worked with Katie Melua, along with putting out albums of his own. Other than drums he has an interest in percussion styles of the world. He plays the tabla on some albums, having studied the instrument under the Indian musician Alla Rakha.

== Discography ==
=== As sideman ===
With Mike Batt

- Schizophonia (Epic, 1977)
- Caravans (CBS, 1978)
- Tarot Suite (Epic, 1979)
- Arabesque (Epic, 1995)

With Roy Budd

- Is the Sound of Music (Pye, 1967)
- Pick Yourself Up!!! (Pye, 1967)
- Roy Budd at Newport (Pye, 1968)
- Budd 'n' Bossa (Pye, 1970)
- Get Carter (Odeon, 1971)
- Fear Is the Key (Pye, 1972)
- Everything's Coming Up Roses (Pye, 1976)

With Dudley Moore

- Plays the Theme from Beyond the Fringe & All That Jazz (Atlantic, 1962)
- The Other Side of Dudley Moore (Decca, 1965)
- Genuine Dud (Decca, 1966)
- Bedazzled (Decca, 1968)
- The Dudley Moore Trio (Decca, 1969)
- Today (Atlantic, 1972)
- At the Wavendon Festival (Black Lion, 1976)
- Dudley Down Under (Cube, 1978)
- The Music of Dudley Moore (Cube, 1978)
- Jazz Jubilee (Martine, 2004)

With others

- Amazing Blondel, Evensong (Island, 1970)
- Harvey Andrews, Friends of Mine (Cube, 1973)
- Steve Ashley, Stroll On (Gull, 1974)
- Ken Baker, Baker's Dozen (Interfusion, 1973)
- Russ Ballard, Winning (Epic, 1976)
- Peter Bardens, Heart to Heart (Arista, 1979)
- Madeline Bell, This Is One Girl (Pye, 1976)
- Teresa Brewer, Teresa Brewer In London (Flying Dutchman, 1973)
- Polly Brown, Special Delivery (GTO, 1975)
- Ian Carr with Nucleus, Solar Plexus (Vertigo, 1971)
- Dave Cartwright, Back to the Garden (Transatlantic, 1973)
- Tina Charles, Heart 'n' Soul (CBS, 1977)
- Chi Coltrane, Let It Ride (Columbia, 1973)
- Ray Ellington, You're the Talk of the Town (Gold Star, 1975)
- David Fanshawe, Arabian Fantasy (EMI, 1976)
- Peter Frampton, Wind of Change (A&M, 1972)
- Serge Gainsbourg, Vu De L'Exterieur (Philips, 1973)
- Roger Glover, The Butterfly Ball and the Grasshopper's Feast (Purple, 1974)
- Stephane Grappelli, Hommage a Django Reinhardt (Festival, 1972)
- Stephane Grappelli, Just One of Those Things (EMI, 1984)
- Steve Harley, Hobo with a Grin (Capitol, 1978)
- Nazia Hassan, Disco Deewane (His Master's Voice, 1980)
- Murray Head, Nigel Lived (CBS, 1972)
- Edmund Hockridge, Hockridge Meets Hammond (Ad-Rhythm, 1975)
- The Hollies, Russian Roulette (Polydor, 1976)
- Catherine Howe, Dragonfly Days (Ariola, 1979)
- Neil Innes, Off the Record (MMC, 1982)
- Davey Johnstone, Smiling Face (Rocket, 1973)
- Gerard Kenny, Coming Home (Park, 2005)
- The King's Singers, Swing (EMI, 1976)
- Basil Kirchin, Abstractions of the Industrial North (Trunk, 2005)
- Basil Kirchin, Particles (Trunk, 2007)
- Cleo Laine, Cleo Laine/Live (Jazz Man, 1981)
- Linda Lewis, Hacienda View (Ariola, 1979)
- London Symphony Orchestra, Classic Rock (K-Tel, 1977)
- Cheryl Lynn, In Love (Columbia, 1979)
- Yehudi Menuhin, Jalousie (EMI Electrola, 1973)
- Katie Melua, Piece by Piece (Dramatico, 2005)
- Spike Milligan, Paul Gallico's The Snow Goose (RCA, 1976)
- Oliver Nelson, Oliver Edward Nelson in London with Oily Rags (Flying Dutchman, 1974)
- Jack Parnell, Braziliana (Music for Pleasure, 1977)
- Tom Paxton, New Songs for Old Friends (Reprise, 1973)
- Tom Paxton, Something in My Life (Private Stock, 1975)
- Chris Rainbow, Looking Over My Shoulder (Polydor, 1978)
- Len Rawle, Yamaha Magic (Ad-Rhythm, 1973)
- John Schroeder, Latin Vibrations (Polydor, 1971)
- Ronnie Scott, When I Want Your Opinion I'll Give It to You (Jazz House, 1997)
- The Seekers, Seekers Seen in Green (Capitol, 1968)
- Peter Skellern, Hard Times (Island, 1975)
- Terry Smith, Fall Out (Philips, 1969)
- Randy Stonehill, Get Me Out of Hollywood (Philips, 1973)
- Swingle II, Madrigals (CBS, 1974)
- Swingle II, Words and Music (CBS, 1974)
- Bernie Taupin, Taupin (DJM, 1971)
- Richard and Linda Thompson, First Light (Chrysalis, 1978)
- Barry Tuckwell, A Sure Thing (Angel, 1979)
- Lee Vanderbilt, Get into What You're in (RCA, 1977)
- Mike Vickers, A Day at the Races (DJM, 1976)
- Loudon Wainwright III, I'm Alright (Rounder, 1985)
- The Walker Brothers, No Regrets (Gto, 1975)
- Clifford T. Ward, No More Rock 'n' Roll (Philips, 1975)
- Denny Wright, Non Stop Pepsi Party (Music for Pleasure, 1974)
- The Yardbirds, Little Games (Epic, 1967)
