= Saturday Date =

Australian television variety show

- Genre: Music television
- Presented by: Jimmy Hannan; Tony Murphy
- Country of origin: Australia
- Original language: English

Original release
- Network: TCN-9
- Release: 1963 – 1967

Saturday Date is an Australian television series which aired on TCN-9 from 1963 to 1967. Originally hosted by Jimmy Hannan and later hosted by Tony Murphy, guest artists who performed on the show included Billy Thorpe and Olivia Newton-John. It was a music show aimed at young teens.

== See also ==
- Six O'Clock Rock
- The Teenage Show
- Teen Time
- Bandstand
- Teenage Mailbag
- The Bryan Davies Show
- Youth Show
