= Long Way to the Top =

Australian television series

- Genre: Rock 'n' roll documentary
- Created by: Australian Broadcasting Corporation
- Written by: Clinton Walker; Tony Barrell; Sandy Webster; James Cockington; Laurie Zion
- Narrated by: Chris Winter
- No. of episodes: 6

Production
- Executive producer: Paul Clarke
- Producers: Greg Appel; Bruce Kane
- Editor: Andrew Glover
- Production company: Australian Broadcasting Corporation

Original release
- Network: ABC Television
- Release: 8 August – 12 September 2001

Long Way to the Top was a six-part weekly Australian Broadcasting Corporation (ABC) documentary film series on the history of Australian rock and roll, from 1956 to the modern era, it was initially broadcast from 8 August to 12 September 2001. One of its writers, James Cockington, provided a book tie-in, Long Way to the Top: Stories of Australian Rock & Roll (2001). Another series writer, and interviewer, Clinton Walker, compiled a 2-disc CD soundtrack album, Long Way to the Top: Original Soundtrack from the ABC-TV Series (13 August 2001), by Various Artists, which featured in the show. It peaked at No. 9 on the ARIA Albums Chart. A year later a related national concert tour followed.

== History ==
Long Way to the Top took its name from the AC/DC song, "It's a Long Way to the Top (If You Wanna Rock 'n' Roll)" (8 December 1975). The six-part series was produced by Paul Clarke (Recovery), directed by Greg Appel and edited by Andrew Glover. It was narrated by former radio presenter Chris Winter (one of the original members of the on-air team at the ABC's 24-hour rock radio station, Double Jay).

It featured interviews with Australasian singers and instrumentalists. Most of the nearly 200 interviews were conducted by music critic Clinton Walker, who also co-wrote the series, and compiled a 2-disc CD soundtrack album, Long Way to the Top: Original Soundtrack from the ABC-TV Series (13 August 2001), by Various Artists featured in the show. It peaked at No. 9 on the ARIA Albums Chart. The other writers were Tony Barrell, Sandy Webster, James Cockington and Laurie Zion. Cockington wrote a book tie-in, Long Way to the Top: Stories of Australian Rock & Roll (2001).

The original series was well received for the ABC when shown in 2001; a national concert tour in 2002 followed.

At the ARIA Music Awards of 2003 the live album won Cast or Show Album.

== Episode list ==
| No. | Title | Written by | Original release date |
|---|---|---|---|
| 1 | "Bed of a Thousand Struggles 1956–1964" | Clinton Walker, Tony Barrell, Sandy Webster, James Cockington, Laurie Zion | 8 August 2001 |
It's the early 1950s and Australia is enjoying a period of post-war calm. On the wireless, amongst the radio-plays, variety shows and deep-voiced announcers are the sounds of Nat King Cole, Benny Goodman or perhaps Tex Morton... lurking beneath this idyllic newsreel exterior was something far more rebellious... the cult of the 'teenager', looking for something to hang their angst upon. The hook was rock and roll! The years were 1956–1964. From rock and roll films to the race to be first, from the recording studio to the crazes that swept the nation. One craze that stayed was Surf Culture. These were wild times indeed. Artists: Johnny O'Keefe, Bee Gees, the Atlantics, Slim Dusty, Judy Stone, Col Joye, the Thunderbirds, Johnny Devlin, Lonnie Lee, the Delltones, the Dee Jays, Carolyn Young, Betty McQuade and Patricia "Little Pattie" Amphlett.
| 2 | "Ten Pound Rocker 1963–1968" | Walker, Barrell, Webster, Cockington, Zion | 15 August 2001 |
In the early sixties a new wave of rhythm and blues arrived in Australia with a Liverpool accent, imported in the cardboard suitcases of young British migrants. These pale, skinny kids in tight suits performed strange tribal dances to a sound born in the Mississippi delta. Artists: The Easybeats, the Seekers, the Twilights, the Masters Apprentices, Daddy Cool, Billy Thorpe and the Aztecs, Col Joye, the Mixtures, Johnny Young, Purple Hearts, Normie Rowe, the Loved Ones, Dinah Lee, and In Focus.
| 3 | "Billy Killed the Fish 1968–1973" | Walker, Barrell, Webster, Cockington, Zion | 22 August 2001 |
Australia took some strange turns in the late 1960s. Something happened for which our convict past had not prepared us: the hippy movement landed and took root. Music was the chosen vehicle for an alternative lifestyle which landed like an extra terrestrial invasion. Suddenly everything was 'out there'. Even 1960s pop bands like the Masters embraced the new voice: 'Do what you want to do, be what you want to be, yeah!' Artists: Billy Thorpe and the Aztecs, the Masters Apprentices, Russell Morris, Ross Wilson, Johnny Young, John Farnham, the Mixtures, Wendy Saddington and Chain.
| 4 | "Berserk Warriors 1973–1981" | Walker, Barrell, Webster, Cockington, Zion | 29 August 2001 |
Australia in the 1970s took the larrikin image to new extremes, including our own native youth – the sharpies. This was the sort of crowd musicians of the time might have to entertain. Some tried explosives, some tried school uniforms, some tried makeup, whatever it took as bands did battle in every pub and living room across the nation. The new wave of Australian hard rock started deep behind the walls of an unassuming concrete bunker in the Sydney suburb of Burwood. Holed up inside were three Scottish brothers. Artists: AC/DC, Cold Chisel, Skyhooks, The Angels, Rose Tattoo, Hush, Stevie Wright, John Paul Young, Sherbet and Ted Mulry. Skyhooks lead singer Graeme Strachan died on the day of broadcast and the episode was dedicated to him.
| 5 | "INXS to Exile 1976–1988" | Walker, Barrell, Webster, Cockington, Zion | 5 September 2001 |
In 1983, Comedian Austen Tayshus made the country's biggest selling single ever "Australiana". Everything in the 1980s in Australia had to be big. For the followers of a small new movement called Punk the challenge was to be heard at all, over the din of excessive self-promotion. This generation of musicians would ask themselves the question: excess or exile? This was the decade when Australians realised they had something of which to be proud. Just like the tourist commission, the local music industry was proud of Australia and ready for the biggest challenge of all: selling Australia's bands to the Americans. It was a group of survivors from the sixties who devised the initial marketing strategy: give the Americans something they could relate to – more American music. Little River Band's world was mellow. A southern comfort zone stuck somewhere in the recent past. But not everyone was into it. Artists: INXS, John Farnham, Men at Work, Split Enz, Mental as Anything, the Saints, Little River Band, Nick Cave, Models, Jimmy Barnes, Divinyls, Hunters & Collectors, the Go-Betweens, Uncanny X-Men and the Triffids.
| 6 | "Gathering of the Tribes 1984–2000" | Walker, Barrell, Webster, Cockington, Zion | 12 September 2001 |
The history of Australian rock has one recurring theme – it's the story of music described as 'alternative' becoming the 'mainstream'. As the century ended, new technology allowed more people than ever before to make their own music and to get it heard. Suddenly, there were many forms of popular music and the notion of a music mainstream began to disappear. For rock and roll artists, the biggest challenge was to breathe life into an old dog – before they were swamped by an enormous tide of beats – dance music. When three brothers strutted down a Miami street in 1977 they started the whole world dancing – and most of Australia with it. Artists: Midnight Oil, Kylie Minogue, Silverchair, Ratcat, Spiderbait, Regurgitator, Savage Garden, Hard-Ons, Paul Kelly, Beasts of Bourbon, the Cruel Sea, the Scientists, Itch-E and Scratch-E, Yothu Yindi, Dave Graney, Custard, TISM and Christine Anu.

== Concert tour ==
In 2002, the promoters Michael Chugg and Kevin Jacobsen decided to build on the popularity of the show, by sending a package tour of artists featured in the program on a national concert tour of Australia. The tour featured Col Joye, Lonnie Lee, Judy Stone, Ray Columbus & the Invaders, Lucky Starr, Billy Thorpe and the Aztecs, Little Pattie, The Masters Apprentices, Stevie Wright, Daddy Cool, Russell Morris. Axiom, Spectrum, Chain, Brian Cadd, Lobby Loyde, Normie Rowe, The Atlantics, The Twilights, Kevin Borich, Max Merritt, Tamam Shud, John Paul Young, Dinah Lee and Marcia Hines. The tour proved to be successful, taking receipts of $10 million with a budget of $4.5 million. The ABC broadcast, highlights of the tour and subsequent CD and DVD packages went on sale.

The popularity of the tour resulted in the Countdown Spectacular tours in 2006 and 2007.

A second tour was staged in 2012 for the tenth anniversary. It featured Axiom, Brian Cadd, Dragon, Marcia Hines, Col Joye, Jim Keays, Dinah Lee, Mi-Sex, Russell Morris, Ian Moss, Noiseworks, Doug Parkinson, Little Pattie, Glenn Shorrock, Spectrum, Lucky Starr, Matt Taylor. Phil Manning and John Paul Young.
