= Leo de Kroo =

Australian musical artist (born 1941)

- Born: 8 July 1941 (age 85); Dordrecht, Netherlands
- Origin: Australia
- Genres: Pop; country
- Occupations: Musician, luthier, announcer
- Instruments: Vocals, guitar
- Years active: 1954–present
- Label: Festival

Leo de Kroo (born 8 July 1941) is an Australian pop and country music singer, and an accomplished luthier. For much of the 1960s he was a regular performer on Bandstand, a pop music TV show, hosted by Brian Henderson. De Kroo was one half of The De Kroo Bros (with his friend Doug Brewer who later changed his surname to de Kroo so they could take the stage name, as well as travel overseas, under the name of "The De Kroo Bros"). As The De Kroo Bros, they also appeared on other pop music shows.

== Early life ==
De Kroo moved from Dordrecht, Netherlands to Western Australia after a few years living in Indonesia. As a young child, de Kroo gained a fascination of the guitar as an instrument after he heard the local news theme being played on the instrument. Making his own instrument with cardboard and rubber bands was the start of a lifelong interest in both playing and making these and other instruments.

De Kroo initially began his music as a solo artist in Perth, Western Australia before he met up with his "brother" Doug, a Perth born singer, who had formed the band the 'Bob Kats' and then later changed that name to 'The Red Rockets', a Skiffle group, and then after the skiffle boom ended, changed their name again to 'The Roulettes'. Leo de Kroo joined the group as the lead singer after their meeting each other. As the Red Rockets and later The Roulettes, de Kroo and the band would occasionally play at Scarborough's 'Ye Olde 'Kool-Korner' Kafe', a milk-bar that had an outside jukebox, a venue that later became known as 'The Snake-Pit'. The Snake-Pit allowed for a place where teenagers could get hamburgers and milk-shakes, and then dance to the music outside on the footpath.

The Roulettes played regularly on local radio station 6PR's 'Hillbilly Hour'. Becoming even more involved in the local scene they started the first rock and roll dance sessions at the Maylands Town Hall, however after working on establishing their band on the local scene, Doug and Leo became ambitious enough to attempt their luck in the east of Australia. Putting their car 'George', a Ford Anglia, on a ship they departed on a four-day voyage to Adelaide, and after sight seeing that city over 3 days, they drove the rest of the way to Melbourne.

Over a three-month period in the southern capital they gained work on the local dance hall circuit and also gained some notoriety by appearing on a number of local radio and television shows. At one stage they gained a musical coup of sorts by being asked to back Johnny Rebb on one of his Melbourne shows. Johnny Rebb was one of the top acts at the time.

De Kroo had also been entertaining crowds singing live during the intermission between back to back movies starring the new sensation Elvis Presley, by impersonating his sound and moves. At about the same time they met Bob Rogers and John Laws, and de Kroo was informed he sounded like Elvis but John Laws on hearing this said that they should follow The Everly Brothers lead and so they became The De Kroo Bros. Arriving in Sydney the brothers not only changed their stage name but in appearance and style fashioned themselves after the American Everly Brothers duo. Their repertoire now included a mixture of rockabilly, country and western and pop harmonies.

== Career ==
After reaching Sydney, The De Kroo Bros also entered the world of all the major television shows at the time simply by telling the producers they were good enough. Accepted at the time by the television studios, The De Kroo Bros soon became known for their playing of live gigs on Bandstand, Australia's Amateur Hour, The Graham Kennedy Show, The Bobby Limb Show, Six O'Clock Rock, Teen Time and the Youth Show. Brian Henderson and Bandstand travelled with The De Kroo Bros in 1965 to Canberra for early versions of today's ubiquitous talent shows, and even to Papua New Guinea for filming and such. De Kroo's association with other well known singers and shows at the time included one with Johnny O'Keefe who as a part of that relationship had The De Kroo Bros provide live performances on the Sing, Sing, Sing (TV series) which ran from 1962 to 1965. Col Joye was their manager at the time.

There signing with Columbia Records resulted in the release of their debut single "On The Job Too Long" and then 6 days later another single, "Loveland". Both of these tracks suffered from lack of playing and did not do well. Columbia also released other singles, and whilst two of these did reach the Australian Top 100, Columbia did not take up the option of renewing their 1-year contract.

The brothers then signed with Festival Records. In October 1961 The De Kroo Bros played as the support bill for the Cliff Richard and the Shadows Show tour of Australia and New Zealand, and with their new record company successfully reached a top 10 single on the national charts with "(And Her Name Is) Scarlet" (released 1963) which reached hit single status in Australia in 1963, especially in the cities of Sydney (#4), Brisbane (#1), and Perth (#5). "(And Her Name Is) Scarlet", had been written by Herb Newman, although the writer credit on record labels has been to a pseudonym, either Barry Stuart or Steven Howard, and had been released in America by Bob Wilson.

In addition they had 4 other singles that all made it to the Australian Top 100. By 1965 Leo and Doug were so popular that the Australian Women's Weekly even included a "how-to" article on knitting a mohair Beatles style jacket just like those worn by the De Kroo "top pop boys".

In 1987 Canetoad Records released a compilation album. In 1988 Festival Records also released a compilation album. The compilation albums have tracks included that were not part of The De Kroo Bros singles releases.

Other than television and live performances, The De Kroo Bros continued to play the club circuit until an amicable split in 1972. Leo and his wife Marianne then moved from Pymble in Sydney and bought a property at Eumungerie near Dubbo. De Kroo continued to pursue his luthier work but also worked as a weekday morning radio announcer from 1999 to 2008 at 2DU.

== Discography ==
=== Singles ===
Year	Single	Chart Positions	Label	Cat
Year	Single	AUS	Label	Cat
1964	"Foggy Mountain Top"	68	Festival	FK507
1964	"Movin' Out"	-	Festival	FK507
1964	"Oh! Susie Darlin"	-	Festival	FK847
1964	"Run in Circles"	-	Festival	FK847
1964	"Buena Suerte"	-	Festival	FK597
1964	"Love Is A Meaningless Word"	-	Festival	FK597
1963	"It Never Came True"	50	Festival	FK312
1963	"Tears of Pity"	-	Festival	FK312
1963	"(And Her Name Is) Scarlet"	9	Festival	FK438
1963	"All Right Be That Way"	-	Festival	FK438
1962	"The Road to Gundagai"	-	Festival	FK201
1962	"Peggy Sue"	-	Festival	FK201
1961	"Don't Let The Stars Get in Your Eyes"	-	Festival	FK108
1961	"All for the Love of You"	-	Festival	FK108
1961	"Love's a Funny Little Game"	90	Columbia	DO4175
1961	"Cave In"	-	Columbia	DO4175
1960	"On The Job Too Long"	-	Columbia	DO4126
1960	"Head Over Heels"	-	Columbia	DO4126
1960	"Cause I Like It"	99	Columbia	DO4127
1960	"Loveland"	-	Columbia	DO4127

=== LP's ===
Year	Album	Label	Cat
1988	"Scarlet – The Festival File, Volume Five"	Festival	L 19005
1987	"The De Kroo Brothers – collector's album"	Canetoad Records	CTLP 002

== Television appearances ==
=== Bandstand ===
Year	Air Date	Song/s
1960	unknown	"Be Bop A Lula"
1960	unknown	"Loveland"
1960	unknown	"In The Summertime"
1961	Best of Bandstand	"Some Sweet Day"
1961	Best of Bandstand	"Love My Life Away"
1963	7 September	"Her Name is Scarlet"
1963	7 September	"All Right, Be That Way"
1963	14 December	"Poppa Joe's"
1963	14 December	"The Girl Who Sang The Blues"
1963	14 December	"Meet Me at Midnight Mary"
1963	Country & Western Special	"It Never Came True"
1963	Moomba Festival Special	"Silver Threads And Golden Needles"
1963	Moomba Festival Special	"Language of Love"
1963	Myer Music Bowl	"Lucille"
1965	24 July	"Michael Row The Boat Ashore"
1967	7 October	"Ballad of Jed Clampett"
1967	7 October	"Blue Moon of Kentucky"
1967	7 October	"Medley"
1968	14 December	"Milk Train"
1968	14 December	"1432 Franklin Pike Circle Hero"

=== Sing, Sing, Sing ===
Year	Air Date	Song/s
1962	October	"Keep A Walking"
1963	October	"Please Help Me I'm Fallin"

== Personal life ==
On 25 February 1966, de Kroo married fellow musician Judy Stone and honeymooned at Hayman Island. The marriage ended amicably in divorce five years later. Leo remarried in 1978 and currently lives with his wife Marianne. They have 2 children, Nina & Karl, and 6 grandchildren. He continues to work as a luthier.
