= Roger Climpson =

Australian journalist (1931–2025)

Roger Climpson OAM
- Born: 18 October 1931; Peterborough, England, UK
- Died: 17 September 2025 (aged 93); Sydney, New South Wales, Australia
- Occupations: Journalist; newsreader; radio/television announcer; reporter; weather presenter; television host/presenter; actor
- Years active: Network television and radio: 1951–1998; 2015; Christian radio: 1998–2004
- Known for: Nine News; Seven News; This is Your Life; Australia's Most Wanted

Roger Climpson OAM (18 October 1931 – 17 September 2025) was a British-born Australian media personality who served a lengthy career in both radio and television, as a journalist and reporter, announcer, newsreader, weather presenter and host. He started his career as an actor in radio, but also appeared in theatre and television productions; post his mainstream media career, he went into Christian broadcasting.

Climpson was a news presenter with both the Nine Network and Seven Network for Seven News in the 1980s and 1990s and hosted shows such as the local version of This Is Your Life and true-crime series Australia's Most Wanted.

== Early life ==
Climpson was born on 18 October 1931 in Peterborough, England. The son of a butcher, he aimed to become a pilot in the Royal Air Force, until a rugby union accident at the age of 14 punctured his lung, leading him to take up acting instead of flying. He emigrated to Australia in 1949, and met his future wife Claire at a Christmas party in 1952.

== Radio and theatre career ==
Climpson started his career locally in theatre and radio, appearing in radio series including Caltex Theatre, The General Motors Hour, When a Girl Marries, Life Can Be Beautiful, and Portia Faces Life as well as narrating Tarzan, Kingdom of the Apes. He also appeared in numerous theatre plays at the ABC.

== Television ==
Climpson had guest roles in early television serials like Homicide and You Can't See Round Corners.

He began his television career at its inception in 1956, working at Channel Nine as an announcer, weatherman and newsreader. He got the job at Nine after asking his friend Brian Henderson to have a word with the head of the network, Bruce Gyngell. During his time at Nine, he hosted two programs of his own: Rendezvous with Roger and The House and Garden Show.

Climpson left Channel Nine in 1965 after chairman Sir Frank Packer refused to grant him a five-pound pay rise. He returned to acting in plays such as The Big Killing (1965) in which Filmink described him as "having the time of his life".

Climpson found himself briefly unemployed and worked at his father's butcher shop, until he was asked to fill a temporary newsreader role at Channel Seven – where he stayed for fifteen years.

In 1977 Climpson presented the afternoon shift on Sydney's 2GB.

In 1977, he began hosting This Is Your Life until returning to newsreading in 1978. In 1982, Climpson retired from television work, but returned to the station in 1989 as anchor of Sydney's Seven News, until a diagnosis of prostate cancer in November 1994 forced his temporary retirement. Ann Sanders replaced him the following year.

In 1997, he was host of Australia's Most Wanted, which lasted until 1998 when he retired from television. Post-retirement he briefly returned to host a TV documentary in 2015.

== Christian radio ==
Climpson was involved in Christian radio broadcasting between 1995 and 2004, was chairman of the Christian Broadcasting Association, and licensee of Sydney Christian radio station Hope 103.2.

== Death ==
Climpson died in Sydney, New South Wales on 17 September 2025, at the age of 93.

== Honours ==
On Australia Day 2004 he was awarded the Medal of the Order of Australia (OAM).

== Radio acting and broadcasting ==
Title
Caltex Theatre
The General Motors Hour
When a Girl Marries
Portia Faces Life
Life Can Be Beautiful
2GB Afternoon Shift (1977)
Host and chairman at Hope 103.2 (1995–2004)

== Filmography (television) ==
Selected credits

Title	Year	Notes
Rope (TV movie)	1957	Mr Blackface
Rendezvous with Roger Climpson (TV series)	1959	Himself
Teenage Mailbag	1960	Himself as Host
The Year in Review (TV movie documentary)	1961	Himself as Host
The Splendour and the Peaks (documentary short)	1962	Himself as Narrator (voice)
The Story of Port Augusta (documentary)	1963	Himself as Narrator and Commentator
The City of Adelaide (documentary)	1965	Himself – Commentator (voice)
The Big Killing (TV movie)	1965	Peter Ashbury
Twelve Night (TV movie)	1966	Orsino
Homicide (TV series)	1967	2 roles Edwin Blake; Al Taylor
Sydney Tonight	1968–1969	Himself as Host
Dangerous Reef (documentary short)	1969	Himself
Celebrity Tattle Tales	1980	Himself
This is Your Life (TV series)	1975–1980	Himself as Host
Australia's Most Wanted (TV series)	1998	Host
Australia the Story Of Us (TV series documentary)	2015	Host

== Newsreader ==
Program Title	Years	Network
Nine News (as news anchor, announcer, weatherman)	1957–1965	Nine Network
Seven News (stint 1) main news presenter	1965–1980	Seven Network
Seven Nightly News (stint 2) (6.00pm bulletin)	1989–1994	Seven Network
