= Teenage Mailbag =

Teenage Mailbag may refer to:

- Teenage Mailbag (1957 TV series), from Melbourne, Australia
- Teenage Mailbag (1960 TV series), from Sydney, Australia
