= Bryan Davies (singer) =

Australian pop musician

- Born: 4 July 1944 (age 81); Manchester, England, United Kingdom
- Origin: Sydney, New South Wales, Australia
- Genres: Pop
- Occupations: Singer; entertainer; actor; TV host
- Instrument: Vocals
- Years active: 1959–present
- Labels: His Master's Voice; Columbia

Bryan Davies (born 4 July 1944) is a British-born Australian pop music singer and entertainer. He appeared on 1960s TV pop shows, Sing! Sing! Sing! and Bandstand. From March 1962, at age 17, he became the youngest person in Australia to host their own TV show, The Bryan Davies Show. The singer issued two albums, On My Way (1965) and Together by Myself (1968). His most popular singles were, "Dream Girl" (July 1961) and "Five Foot Two Eyes of Blue" (October), which both reached the top 4 on the Sydney charts.

== Early life ==
Bryan Davies was born in Manchester in 1944. At the age of four his family migrated to Sydney. His father, Norman R Davies, was an analytical chemistry lecturer at the University of New South Wales, his mother was a former dancer.

== Career ==
His first TV appearance was on teen music show, Teen Time, on 27 September 1960, while he was a student at Canterbury Boys' High School. He left in the following year and was signed by the His Master's Voice label.

Davies first hit single, a cover version of Mark Wynter's "Dream Girl", reached No. 1 in Sydney in July 1961. He also appeared on 1960s TV pop shows, Sing! Sing! Sing! and Bandstand (from 1961). His second hit was "Five Foot Two Eyes of Blue" (October 1961), which reached No. 4 in Sydney. It was originally performed by the California Ramblers in 1925 as "Has Anybody Seen My Gal?". His other popular singles were, "I Don't Like to Be Alone", "Love and Money" and "Ten Pin Bowling" (July 1962).

At age 17, Davies became the youngest person in Australia to host his or her own TV show, The Bryan Davies Show, from March 1962. Regular guests were Neil Williams, Judy Cannon and the Don Burrows Sextet. It was broadcast for 75 episodes on ABC TV, directed by Lloyd Brydon and finished in December of the following year. Resident female singer, Coral Kelly, later became a scriptwriter.

From December 1963 to January 1964 Davies appeared in Once upon a Surfie, a youth oriented musical, at the Palace Theatre, Sydney with his then-girlfriend, Jacki Weaver, as well as the Delltones, Dig Richards, Lucky Starr, Rob E G, and Jay Justin. It was written by Bill Watson, and centred on the antics of Gadget, portrayed by Weaver, "a snooty surfing girl whom the rest of the cast are intent on bringing down a peg or two." It was a parody of the then-popular Sandra Dee Gidget films. Jay Justin was a song writer who provided Davies with material.

In 1963, Davies met Norrie Paramor, a British composer, producer and conductor, who was impressed with the singer's work and was encouraged to return to England in February 1964. In May that year he recorded with Paramor producing. Davies returned to Australia in October and "adopted a more Beatles-influenced style and appearance." In February 1967 he re-entered the Sydney charts top 20 with "Alberta", his last hit recording. According to Australian musicologist, Ian McFarlane, "by the late 1960s Davies had moved into cabaret and television work."

Davies took up acting and hosting roles for TV shows and was a cast member on The Mavis Bramston Show (1964–68), and featured in 7 Network's Anything Goes (1968) with Nancye Hayes, Reg Livermore and Johnny Lockwood. In July 1979 he took the role of Sebastian in Your Own Thing at the Comedy Theatre, Melbourne. He had a guest role in a Matlock Police episode, "What's in It for Me" (1973). In 1981 Davies was the presenter of a short-lived Candid Camera-styled game show, Catch Us If You Can.

Davies worked in The Johnny O'Keefe Memorial Show, alongside other singers from that era including Alan Dale, Vicki Forrest, Barry Stanton and Johnny Devlin. He later performed with Roland Storm and Lucky Starr in the Golden Boys of Aussie Rock 'n' Roll show. In 1994 Davies had a minor role, as the Barman, in the biographical feature film, Sirens.

== Personal life ==
Davies dated aspiring actress Jacki Weaver from late 1962 after meeting while both performed in a Christmas pantomime, A Wish Is a Dream, at the Phillip Theatre, Sydney. In May 1964 Davies was in London and described to Betty Best of The Australian Women's Weekly how, "[Weaver] wants to be an actress, so perhaps when she finishes school this year she might come over to London with her mother to try her luck." Upon his return in October, Weaver observed, "I never liked Bryan's brushed-back hairstyle before, and was always trying to get him to grow it and brush it down at the front... I think it's great now. And I love all his new clothes – the high-collared shirts, square-toed leather boots, and especially the three-piece suit."

By November 1975 Davies was married to Tracy and the couple had two children and now have two grandchildren.

== Discography ==
Credits:

=== Albums ===
- On My Way' (1963) – His Master's Voice (OCLP-7585)
- Together by Myself (1968) – Columbia Records (OEX-9498)

=== Extended plays ===
- Bryan Davies (1965) – His Master's Voice (7EGO-70052)

=== Singles ===
- "Dream Girl" (July 1961) – His Master's Voice (EA-4425) Sydney radio charts: No. 1
- "Five Foot Two" (October 1961) – His Master's Voice (EA-4444) Sydney: No. 4
- "Sad Sixteen" (Bryan Davies with Orchestra)(1961) – Columbia Records (DO-4327)
- "Twist 'n' Twirlin'" (1962) – His Master's Voice (EA-4456)
- "Tin Pin Bowling" (1962) – His Master's Voice (EA-4466) Sydney: No. 18
- "Don't Ever No Never" (1962) – His Master's Voice (EA-4479)
- "Don't Love and Run" (November 1962) His Master's Voice
- "Rich Boy" (1963) – His Master's Voice (EA-4579)
- "Love and Money" (1964) – His Master's Voice (EA-4652)
- "I'm Gonna Make You Cry" (1964) – His Master's Voice (EA-4669)
- "In Your Shoes" (Bryan Davies with Orchestra)(1964) – Columbia Records (DO-4479)
- "Tell the Other Guy" (Bryan Davies with Orchestra)(1964) – Columbia Records (DO-4531)
- "Watch What You Say" (February 1965) – His Master's Voice
- "I Should Have Stayed in Bed" (April 1965) – His Master's Voice (EA-4679)
- "I Need Help (Help! Help!)" (1965) – His Master's Voice (EA-4724)
- "Do You Mind" (1966) – His Master's Voice (EA-4757)
- "Why?" (1966) – His Master's Voice (EA-4785)
- "With Love from Jenny" (by Bryan Davies and Little Pattie) (1966) – His Master's Voice (EA-4812)
- "Alberta" (1967) – His Master's Voice (EA-4845) Sydney: No. 18
- "Night and Day" (1967) – His Master's Voice (EA-4873)
- "Won't Be the Last" (1968) – Columbia Records (DO-5065)
