= Teenage Mailbag (1957 TV series) =

- Genre: Music television
- Presented by: Ernie Sigley; Gaynor Bunning; Heather Horwood
- Country of origin: Australia
- Original language: English

Production
- Running time: 15 minutes; 60 minutes

Original release
- Network: HSV-7
- Release: 1957 – 1958

Related
- The Teenage Show

Teenage Mailbag was an Australian television series which aired in 1957 to 1958 on Melbourne station HSV-7. Information on this series is scarce. According to a 2008 article in The Age, the format consisted of Ernie Sigley, Gaynor Bunning and Heather Horwood singing requested songs in a 15-minute slot, later expanded to an hour. The one-hour version became the series The Teenage Show (1958-1960?). At one point, the series aired at 7:15PM, preceded by another 15-minute series titled Take That and followed by an American program (The Adventures of Rin-Tin-Tin).

It should not be confused with an unrelated 1960s series by the same name which aired on TCN-9 in Sydney (see Teenage Mailbag).

== See also ==
- Teen Time
- TV Disc Jockey
