= Judy Stone =

Australian singer and musician (born 1944)

Judy Stone AM
- Born: Judith Anne Stone; 31 December 1941 (age 84) (Note: Stone's date and year of birth are inconsistently reported in years ranging from 1940 to 1944.); Summer Hill, New South Wales
- Origin: Granville, New South Wales, Australia
- Genres: Pop; country
- Occupations: Singer; musician
- Instruments: Vocals; guitar
- Years active: 1956 – c. 2011
- Labels: Festival, Universal Summit

Judith Anne Stone (born 31 December 1941) is an Australian retired singer and musician, who has recorded songs in the pop, rock and country genres. Stone often sang cover versions of cover that where popular from the United States and the United Kingdom, and on occasion Italy and Sweden. She had top 20 singles on the national charts with "I'll Step Down" (1962), "4,003,221 Tears from Now" (1964), "Born a Woman" (1966), and "Would You Lay with Me" (1974).

== Early life ==
Judith Anne Stone was born on 31 December 1941 at Summer Hill, New South Wales and grew up in the Sydney suburb of Granville. She has two younger sisters, Joyce and Janice.

From a young age she sang country music at home and her parents bought her a guitar, which she learned to play.

== Career ==
Stone entered and won a local talent contest in her early teens and was noticed by country singer Reg Lindsay. By November 1956 she had joined his touring performance troupe, the Reg Lindsay Show, and stayed for 18 months. In July 1957 a reviewer of Lindsay's show in Cabramatta for The Biz wrote that "Little Judy Stone, of Granville, was very pleasing in her turn."

Stone hired Kevin Jacobsen as her talent agent. She described meeting him, "I used to sing, with a heavy guitar, Western style numbers. Once I met Kevin he gave me one instruction: 'Throw that guitar out the window.' Although I did not throw it out any window, I am now singing without any of my own musical accompaniment." Jacobsen's older brother, Col Joye, was an established pop singer and regular performer on Bandstand, a TV music show. Stone supported his group, Joye and the Joy Boys, on their tours of South Australia, Victoria and Queensland. Stone, as a young performer, had been billed as "The Cowgirl from Granville" but on her first appearance on Bandstand she was mistakenly announced as "The Callgirl from Granville". By May 1961 she had also appeared on other TV music shows, Teen Time and Six O'Clock Rock.

Jacobsen had Stone signed with Festival Records and in June 1961 she issued her debut single, "You're Driving Me Mad" – a cover version of the 1958 song by United States singer, Jo Ann Campbell. For the track she was backed by the Joy Boys. In August she relocated to Melbourne, for three months, to appear on Graham Kennedy's In Melbourne Tonight variety TV show. She expected that "While in Melbourne most of my shows will be adult performances, which will be a change from the present teenagers' shows." Her third single, "I'll Step Down", was released in February 1962 and became a top 10 hit in Sydney and top 20 in Brisbane. The Biz' correspondent compared it to her earlier single, "Although very different to 'You're Driving Me Mad', this still possesses the inimitable style of this great little local star." Also in that year Stone issued her debut album, I'll Step Down, on Festival.

In 1963 she recorded "It Takes a Lot (To Make Me Cry)" on which the Bee Gees (Barry, Robin and Maurice Gibb) sing backup vocals; it was released as a single in July. Her seventh single, "4,003,221 Tears from Now", was released in April 1964. It is a cover version of the 1963 single by US singer Kerri Downs (aka Mary Lou Kiernan). According to Australian musicologist, Ian McFarlane, it "became Stone's most popular release of the 1960s. The heart-wrenching ballad... [which] peaked at #8 in Sydney and #7 in Melbourne."

In August–September 1974, Stone accompanied Rolf Harris (along with Ross Ryan, didgeridoo player David Blanasi) to perform at Expo '74 in Spokane, Washington, United States. Helen Reddy and other singers also gave performances at the Expo.

Aside from her solo releases, Stone was often teamed with Col Joye in duets for singles, extended plays and albums. McFarlane found their work "contained cutesy material like 'Young and Healthy', 'Angry' and 'Side by Side'." In early 1965 Stone with Col Joye and the Joy Boys undertook a tour of Japan for two months. In September 1966 she covered "Born a Woman" by US singer, Sandy Posey. It was a top 10 hit in Sydney.

From the late 1960s and into the early 1970s Stone "consolidated on her early pop successes with regular appearances on the club and country music circuits." Later singles included, "Mare Mare Mare" (January 1974), "Would You Lay with Me (In a Field of Stone)" (No. 2, June 1974), "Silver Wings and Golden Rings" (February 1975) and "Hasta Mañana" (May 1976).

In 2007 Stone performed a duet with Scottish singer-songwriter Isla Grant on the track "What's a Girl to Do?" for Grant's album, Down Memory Lane.

She retired in around 2011 due to the effects of throat cancer.

== Recognition and honours ==
On the Queen's Birthday Honours List of June 2006, Stone was appointed Member of the Order of Australia, "For service to the community as an entertainer at fundraising events for a range of charitable organisations, and as a singer".

In January 2013 she was made Australia Day Ambassador for regional celebrations in Nelson Bay and in 2014 in Laurieton, Wauchope, and Port Macquarie.

In 2023, Stone was inducted into the Australian Women in Music's Honour Roll by Beccy Cole.

=== Awards and nominations ===
==== Australian Women in Music Awards ====
The Australian Women in Music Awards is an annual event that celebrates outstanding women in the Australian Music Industry who have made significant and lasting contributions in their chosen field. They commenced in 2018.

Year	Nominee / work	Award	Result	Ref.
2023	Judy Stone	Honour Roll	awarded	

==== King of Pop Awards ====
The King of Pop Awards were voted by the readers of TV Week. The King of Pop award started in 1967 and ran through to 1978.

Year	Nominee / work	Award	Result
1972	herself	Best Dressed Female	Won

==== Mo Awards ====
The Australian Entertainment Mo Awards (commonly known informally as the Mo Awards), were annual Australian entertainment industry awards. They recognise achievements in live entertainment in Australia from 1975 to 2016. Judy Stone won nine awards in that time.

Year	Nominee / work	Award	Result (wins only)
1981	Judy Stone	Country Female of the Year	Won
1982	Judy Stone	Country Female of the Year	Won
1983	Judy Stone	Country Female of the Year	Won
1984	Judy Stone	Country Female Entertainer of the Year	Won
1985	Judy Stone	Country Female Entertainer of the Year	Won
1986	Judy Stone	Country Female Entertainer of the Year	Won
1987	Judy Stone	Country Female Entertainer of the Year	Won
1988	Judy Stone	Country Female Entertainer of the Year	Won
2007	Judy Stone	Hall of Fame	inductee

== Personal life ==
On 25 February 1966, Stone married fellow musician, Leo de Kroo. The de Kroo brothers, Leo and Doug, were a duo who also appeared on Bandstand and other pop music shows. The marriage ended in divorce five years later.

In January 1992 Stone was diagnosed with throat cancer, at the same time as her fellow Bandstand regular, Peter Allen. Both Stone and Allen were operated on the same day by the same surgeon. In June, Stone was still in recovery when she learned of Allen's death.

== Charts ==
Stone had top 20 singles on the national charts with:

- "I'll Step Down" (No. 19, February 1962)
- "4,003,221 Tears from Now" (April 1964)
- "Born a Woman" (No. 3, September 1966)
- "Would You Lay with Me" (No. 2, June 1974)

== Television ==
Year	Title	Role	Type
1958	In Melbourne Tonight	Singer	
1960–1961	Six O'Clock Rock	Singer	
1961–1967	Bandstand	Singer	22 episodes
1966–1967	The Go!! Show	Singer	3 episodes
1973	The Graham Kennedy Show	Singer	3 episodes
1973	The True Blue Show	Various characters	1 episode
1974–1975	The Ernie Sigley Show	Singer	9 episodes
1975	This Is Your Life	Herself	Episode: "Johnny O'Keefe"
1977	This Is Your Life	Herself	Episode: "Brian Henderson"
1978–1979	Reg Lindsay's Country Homestead	Regular singer	
1981	The Don Lane Show	Singer ("Dancing Round the Moon")	1 episode
1982	The Daryl Somers Show	Singer ("Everly Brothers Medley" with Little Pattie)	1 episode
1982	Lee Conway Show	Singer ("Summer Wine" with Lee Conway & Leanne Douglas)	1 episode
1985	Come In... Australia	Singer ("Number One in My Heart")	TV pilot
1987	Have a Go	Guest judge	3 episodes
1988	1988 NSW Royal Bicentennial Concert	Singer ("4,300,221 Tears from Now")	TV special
2001	This Is Your Life	Herself (with Col Joye)	Episode: "Trisha Noble"
2002	Long Way to the Top: Live in Concert	Singer ("4,300,221 Tears from Now" / "Hasta Mañana")	Concert special

== Discography ==
=== Studio albums ===
List of albums, with Australian chart positions
Title	Album details	Peak chart positions
Title	Album details	AUS
I'll Step Down	Released: 1962; Format: LP; Label: Festival Records (FL 30805)	—N/a
Col and Judy (by Col Joye and Judy Stone)	Released: 1962; Format: LP; Label: Festival Records (FL 30901)	—N/a
Got You on My Mind	Released: 1964; Format: LP; Label: Festival Records (FL 31331)	—N/a
Pure Stone'	Released: 1971; Format: LP; Label: Frog Records Australia (FLP-001)	-
Born to Lose	Released: 1972; Format: LP; Label: Universal Summit (SRA250.116)	-
In a Field of Stone	Released: 1974; Format: LP; Label: M7 (MLFA 070)	63
A Part of Me	Released: 1976; Format: LP; Label: Universal Summit (SCD 499 027)	-

=== Extended plays ===
- I Cried – (June 1964) Festival Records

=== Singles ===
Year	Single	Chart Positions
Year	Single	AUS
1961	"You're Driving Me Mad"	80
1961	"Danger! Heartbreak Ahead"	–
1962	"I'll Step Down"/"Mommie and Daddy Were Twistin'"	19
1962	"Finders Keepers"	50
1962	"I Wanna Love You"	–
1963	"It Takes a Lot (To Make Me Cry)"	–
1964	"4,003,221 Tears from Now"	11
1964	"Break My Heartbreak"	–
1965	"Hard to Say Goodnight"	–
1965	"In My Neighbourhood"	–
1966	"Born a Woman"	3
1967	"Don't Touch Me"	–
1967	"And the Trouble with Me Is You"	–
1968	"I Might as Well Get Used to It"	–
1969	"Society's Child"	–
1971	"Day by Day"	25
1974	"Mare, Mare, Mare (Keep Safe My Love)"	22
1974	"Would You Lay with Me (In a Field of Stone)"	2
1974	"Where are the Clowns"	79
1975	"We Two Will Love (Oui Pour La Vie)"	94
1975	"Silver Wings and Golden Rings"	39
1976	"Hasta Mañana"	40
1978	"What are You Doing Tonight?"	–
1980	"Years"	–
1980	"Magic in Your Mind"	–
1983	"Number One in My Heart"	–

==== Other singles ====
List of singles as featured artist, with selected chart positions
Title	Year	Peak chart positions
Title	Year	AUS
"The Garden" (as Australia Too)	1985	22
