= Accent on Youth =

Accent on Youth may refer to:

- Accent on Youth (play), a 1934 Broadway play written by Samson Raphaelson
- Accent on Youth (film), a 1935 American comedy film, based on the play
- Accent on Youth (TV series), an Australian music variety television series
