= Cathy Wayne =

Australian singer and dancer (1949-1969)

- Cathy Wayne publicity shot

Background information
- Born: Catherine Anne Warnes; 7 December 1949; Arncliffe, New South Wales, Australia
- Died: 20 July 1969 (aged 19) Da Nang, South Vietnam
- Genres: pop, rock
- Occupations: singer, dancer
- Years active: 1965–1969
- Formerly of: Sweethearts on Parade

Catherine Anne Warnes (7 December 1949 – 20 July 1969), professionally Cathy Wayne, was an Australian singer and dancer, who was killed during a tour of Vietnam at a United States Marine Base where she was hosting with others a music concert to entertain the troops during the Vietnam War conflict. Wayne had just finished a song at a Non-commissioned officer's club near Da Nang in South Vietnam Wayne was hit by a bullet fired from a .22 pistol, fitted with a silencer, which had been stolen at the base. Wayne was the first Australian woman killed during the Vietnam War.

Sergeant James Wayne Killen was originally convicted of the unpremeditated murder of Wayne; at his first court-martial it was alleged that he was aiming for his commanding officer, Major Roger E. Simmons. Wayne had intended to use money earned from her performances in Vietnam to revive her recording career; and to marry her fiancé, Clive Cavanagh, who was the drummer for her performance troupe, Sweethearts on Parade. Killen served two years of his sentence in the US, before a second court-martial cleared him of the charge and he was released.

== Biography ==
Cathy Wayne was born as Catherine Anne Warnes on 7 December 1949 in Arncliffe, New South Wales, Australia. Wayne was the child of George Warnes and Nancy Starnes, née Buck. She went to Athelstane Public School where she began singing and dancing classes. Wayne later attended Arncliffe Girls' High School, and, before the age of 12, had performed in school concerts and local community stage shows. She took up a dancing spot on the localised version of Opportunity Knocks on the Nine Network. She also appeared on an Australian TV special, A Night with Leslie, starring US entertainer Leslie Uggams. At the age of 16, after winning a talent contest, Wayne was offered a regular role on television variety show, Bandstand, alongside veteran Rock 'N' Roll performers Col Joye and Little Pattie. Wayne signed with Joye's agency ATA and was managed by his sister Carole Jacobsen.

Although under legal drinking age, Wayne performed in licensed clubs around Sydney, and also recorded advertising jingles. She recorded singles, although these failed to enter the charts. However concert tours along the east coast of Australia, headlined by Joye, led to her being asked on her first tour of South Vietnam at the age of 17, in early 1967, to entertain troops stationed there during the Vietnam conflict. This tour was sanctioned by the Australian Forces Advisory Committee on Entertainment. Wayne was presented as a modette version of fellow Bandstand regular Little Pattie. Upon return to Australia, Wayne continued her appearances on Bandstand and touring with Joye.

In mid-1969, Sweethearts on Parade, an Australian pop group and performing troupe, was established by Sydney promoter Les Maisler to tour Vietnam. Sweethearts on Parade consisted of Wayne on lead vocals, Clive Cavanagh on drums, Jacqui Edwards as a Go-Go dancer, Rick Hoare on guitar, Jeff Howison as MC, singer and comedian, Jimmy Taylor on organ and bass guitar, and Natalia Woloch as a Go–Go dancer. Wayne, as lead singer of Sweethearts on Parade, returned to South Vietnam on an unsanctioned tour. Wayne's parents and Col Joye attempted to dissuade her from this second tour, but Wayne insisted and intended to use money earned from her performances in Vietnam to restart her recording career. Wayne wanted to marry her fiancé, Cavanagh, who was the drummer in Sweethearts on Parade. The group arrived in Vietnam on 26 June 1969, Wayne stayed in Saigon between shows for Australian and US troops.

Entertaining Vietnam (2003), showing Cathy Wayne onstage in June or July 1969 performing to troops in Vietnam

The tour agent was Ingrid Hart, who recalled that "[Wayne] wanted to be there with her boyfriend, they were going to get some money together and get married". On 20 July 1969, Sweethearts on Parade were performing for about 75 US Marines at a Non-commissioned officer's club 7 km (4 mi) south-east of Da Nang in South Vietnam. At about 9:15 p.m., Wayne had just finished a song, "Dock of the Bay", and was waiting to introduce her fellow performers when she was hit in the chest by a bullet fired from a .22 pistol, fitted with a silencer, which had been stolen at the base. Wayne died almost instantly as the bullet severed her aorta. In Entertaining Vietnam, a 2003 documentary directed and produced by Mara Wallis, Taylor was interviewed on the events of Wayne's death as footage of a Sweethearts on Parade performance was shown (see screenshot at left). Taylor recalled that he was sitting about a metre (three feet) behind Wayne and that Cavanagh had stepped forward to cradle his fiancée when she slumped to the floor.

At his first court-martial, US Marine Sergeant James Wayne Killen was charged with premeditated murder and was alleged to have been aiming for his commanding officer, Major Roger E. Simmons. Killen was convicted of the unpremeditated murder of Wayne; he was stripped of all service privileges, dishonourably discharged and sentenced to 20 years hard labour. Killen denied all murder claims but admitted to drinking heavily on the night. After the autopsy in Saigon, Wayne's body was returned to Sydney and cremated according to Anglican rites. The Sydney Morning Herald's Shane Green cited Don Morrison's book, written under his pen name J D Owen, Murder on Stage; Morrison described how Killen served two years of his sentence before being given a re-trial in the US where he was cleared of the charge of unpremeditated murder and released. As of April 2015 the actual shooter had not been identified. Based on Morrison's research, the Australian Dictionary of Biography entry on Warnes was amended in June 2015. Australian journalist Toby Creswell described Warnes' death in February 2024 as "best-known tragedy to befall an entertainer in Vietnam" and that her killer, "probably a US serviceman", was never convicted.
