= Biz =

Biz, BIZ or The Biz may refer to:

== People ==
- Biz Mackey (1897—1965), American catcher and manager in Negro league baseball
- Biz Markie (1964–2021), American rapper, singer, DJ, record producer, actor, comedian, and writer
- Biz Stone (born 1974), co-founder of Twitter

== Media and entertainment ==
- BIZ (Berliner Illustrirte Zeitung), a German news magazine
- The Biz (album), 1995, by The Sea and Cake
- The Biz (newspaper), a weekly newspaper published in New South Wales, Australia from 1917 to 1980
- The Biz (TV series), a BBC children's drama series which originally aired from 1994 to 1996
- The Biz (video game), a 1984 computer game about managing a rock band
- Biz (Centuria), fictional character in the Japanese web manga Centuria

== Other uses ==
- Belize, IOC code BIZ
- Biz, colloquial for business
- Biz (detergent), a laundry detergent
- .biz, a generic top-level domain name
- BIZ (German: Bank für internationalen Zahlungsausgleich), the Bank for International Settlements
- ISO 639 code for the Ngiri language, native to the Democratic Republic of the Congo

== See also ==
- Byz (disambiguation)
- Show biz
