= Dinah Lee =

1960s pop singer

- Also known as: also recording as Diane Lee
- Born: Diane Marie Jacobs; 19 August 1943 (age 83); Waimate, New Zealand
- Origin: Christchurch, New Zealand
- Genres: Pop, adult contemporary
- Occupation: Singer
- Years active: 1958–present
- Labels: Viking; His Master's Voice; Polydor; Island; Canetoad; Regal; TFM
- Website: www.dinahlee.com.au

Diane Marie Jacobs (born 19 August 1943) known professionally as Dinah Lee, also recorded as Diane Lee, is a New Zealand singer who performed 1960s pop and adult contemporary music. Her debut single from early 1964, "Don't You Know Yockomo?", achieved No. 1 chart success in New Zealand and in the Australian cities of Brisbane and Melbourne. It was followed in September by her cover version of Jackie Wilson's, "Reet Petite", which also reached No. 1 in New Zealand and peaked at No. 6 in Melbourne. The Australian release was a double A-sided single with "Do the Blue Beat". On her early singles she was backed by fellow New Zealanders, Max Merritt & His Meteors. Lee appeared regularly on both New Zealand and Australian TV variety programs, including Johnny O'Keefe's Sing, Sing, Sing and Bandstand. She toured supporting Johnny O'Keefe, as well as Ray Columbus & the Invaders and P.J. Proby. According to Australian rock music journalist, Ed Nimmervoll, in the 1960s, "Lee was the most successful female singer in both her New Zealand homeland and Australia ... on stage and on record Dinah had all the adventure and exuberance for the time the boys had".

== Early life ==
Dinah Lee was born as Diane Marie Jacobs in 19 August 1943 in Waimate, New Zealand. After her parents separated, she was fostered by a family near Christchurch where she attended Cashmere High School. Her father was a saxophonist, who worked selling carpets in a Christchurch department store and, part-time, ran a teen dance club – The Country Club Cabaret. In 1958, Lee was asked to sing at the club on Saturdays and became popular with local patrons. As a 15-year-old, she had her first professional gig with Bobby Davis & the Dazzlers in a small hall and they later worked in a coffee lounge.

In 1962, Lee was working with Christchurch group, Saints, and dating their guitarist and vocalist, Phil Garland. By the end of 1962, Saints had split and Lee and Garland formed The Playboys with Mark Graham on guitar, Brian Ringrose (ex-Ray Columbus & the Invaders) on guitar, Dave Martin on guitar and Graeme Miller on drums. They relocated to Auckland for a residency at Top 20 Club, Lee shared lead vocals with Garland, one of her covers was Huey "Piano" Smith's "Don't You Know Yockomo?" popularised by American R&B artist Dee Dee Sharp. The Playboys returned to Christchurch, but by 1963 Lee returned to Auckland to pursue her solo career, she supported gigs by Max Merritt & His Meteors or Ray Columbus & the Invaders. The Playboys recruited Graeme's brother Dave on vocals and later became The Dave Miller Set in Sydney.

Lee adopted the latest Mod fashions following advice from boutique owner, Jackie Holme – a pageboy haircut, white make-up, op-art clothes and white boots. After being recommended by Merritt, she joined the Startime Spectacular Tour of North Island which was headlined by Bill & Boyd and Max Merritt & His Meteors – Merritt's band backed her during her set. Her performances were more animated and energetic than typically demure female pop artists. Lee was heckled at some regional venues and her mother was unable to recognise her when catching up at an airport. Tour organiser James Haddleton became her manager and she was signed with Viking Records, an independent label based in Wellington, and she was promoted as 'Queen of the Mods'.

== Career ==
=== 1964-1965: New Zealand, USA, UK ===
Dinah Lee's debut single, "Don't You Know Yockomo?", was released in August 1964 – under the name Diane Lee, chosen by Viking – and peaked at No. 1 in New Zealand. Viking used Merritt's band to back her in the studio and after the first pressings had sold out, Viking changed the attribution to Dinah Lee. Ray Columbus & the Invaders' single, "She's a Mod" became the first by a New Zealand act to reach No. 1 on an Australian chart. Only weeks later, Lee's single, "Don't You Know Yockomo?" was issued there by EMI on their His Master's Voice label and reached No. 1 in Brisbane and Melbourne.

Lee's second single, "Reet Petite" was a cover of Jackie Wilson's hit and had also been recorded with Merritt's band, when released in September it reached No. 1 in New Zealand. Her third single, Ray Rivera's "Do the Blue Beat", followed in October in New Zealand. "Reet Petite" and "Do the Blue Beat" were issued as a double A-sided single in Australia and reached No. 3 in Adelaide and No. 6 in Melbourne. Lee toured New Zealand and Australia on Starlift '64, promoted by Harry M. Miller, with a bill headed by The Searchers, Peter and Gordon and Del Shannon. Backing Lee at some gigs were Ray Columbus & the Invaders and, in Sydney, a newly formed group – The Easybeats. With "Reet Petite" charting in Australia, rock'n'roller Johnny O'Keefe invited Lee to appear on his television series, Sing, Sing, Sing and join his Sydney club shows.

Upon return to Auckland, Lee issued her fourth Viking single, "Who Stole the Sugar?" in November. She featured on two half-hour specials on New Zealand TV, while "I'm Walking" was issued as her next Australian single by His Master's Voice. By year's end, Viking had also released two extended plays, Don't You Know... and Yeah, Yeah We Love Them All and her debut album, Introducing Dinah Lee.

In early 1965, Lee appeared on Australian TV shows, Bandstand and Saturday Date. One of her Bandstand performances was at Myer Music Bowl with headlining Jamaican Blue beat singer Millie Small, and meeting her manager Chris Blackwell. Lee travelled to the United States to appear on Shindig! – she sang with Glen Campbell – and on other TV shows. Lee then went to the United Kingdom and stayed with Millie Small. She released two UK singles in 1965: "I'll Forgive You Then Forget You" and "I Can't Believe What You Say" on Island Records' label Aladdin (owned by Chris Blackwell), and appeared on Thank Your Lucky Stars. In August–September, Lee toured New Zealand and Australia with US pop sensation, P.J. Proby – noted for splitting his pants on stage in the UK in February – who had been banned by the BBC. In Australia, His Master's Voice released "Let Me In" to coincide with the tour. Lee won 'Entertainer of the Year' at New Zealand's inaugural NEBOA Awards in late September – soon after she decided to base herself in Australia. Late in the year, Viking released a string of singles, "He Can't Do the Blue Beat", "Nitty Gritty" and "That's it I Quit", in New Zealand. In November, they released her second studio album, The Sound of Dinah Lee.

=== 1966-1979: Australia ===
Late in 1965, Dinah Lee relocated to Sydney and in March 1966 she undertook a second tour with Small. Lee's next single was "He Don't Want Your Love Anymore" but her chart success had begun to decline. On 29 June 1966, Australian teen newspaper, Go-Set published "The Dinah Lee Story" and she appeared on their front cover. Her public popularity was still high – she was voted No. 2 'Female Vocal' in Go-Set's pop poll in October and was in the top 5 for 1967 and 1968.

Lee continued to release singles in 1966, she toured with Proby in September–October and followed with a third studio album, The Mod World of Dinah Lee late that year. In April 1967, she became the 'face' for Yardley Cosmetics' commercials on Australian TV. Her July single for Viking and His Master's Voice was "Sorry Mama" but neither company renewed her contract.

Lee spent most of the late 1960s on the night club circuit with occasional variety TV appearances. Lee successfully sued her former manager, Haddleton, for money owed and re-took control of her financial interests. According to Australia rock music journalist, Ed Nimmervoll, in the 1960s, "Lee was the most successful female singer of in [sic] both her New Zealand homeland and Australia ... on stage and on record Dinah had all the adventure and exuberance for the time the boys had." Lee entertained troops in Vietnam in the late 1960s on Australian Broadcasting Commission-sponsored tours (under her birth name, Diane Jacobs) and was awarded the Vietnam Logistic and Support Medal.

In the 1970s, she continued to release singles including "Tell Him" in 1972 on Polydor. In 1974, she joined O'Keefe on his comeback show, The Good Old Days of Rock'n'Roll, at St. George Leagues Club. Her next single, "It Doesn't Matter Anymore" appeared in 1976 on Festival Records. "I Can See Clearly Now" was released in 1979 on Laser Records.

=== 1980s onwards ===
In 1982, a compilation, Best of Dinah Lee was issued on Music World. By 1984, she had become involved in body building winning the 'Australian Female Body Builder of the Year' in the over 35s category. In the 1990s and 2000s, Lee continued performing on the club circuit and became a motivational speaker.

ABC-TV series, Long Way to the Top, was broadcast in August 2001. Lee featured on "Episode 2: Ten Pound Rocker 1963–1968" where she discussed the mod look and her appeal to rebellious teens, "I had this image and it wasn't cute and pretty". The TV series inspired the Long Way to the Top national concert tour during August–September 2002, which featured a host of the best Australian acts of the 1950s, 1960s and 1970s. Lee's performances of "Don't You Know Yockomo?" and "Reet Petite" at the final Sydney concert, as well as an interview with promoter, Michael Chugg, feature on the associated DVD, Long Way to the Top: Live in Concert released in 2002. As from October 2023 Lee was performing on the nostalgia circuit as the Good Old Days of Rock'n'roll, with fellow veterans, Digger Revell, Little Pattie and Lucky Starr.

== Awards and nominations ==
As from December 2010, Lee is a board member of Phonographic Performance Company of Australia.

In October 2019 she was presented with the President's Award from the Variety Artists Club of New Zealand.

In November 2025 she was presented with the Benny Award from the Variety Artists Club of New Zealand, the highest honour for a New Zealand variety entertainer.

=== Aotearoa Music Awards ===
The Aotearoa Music Awards (previously known as New Zealand Music Awards (NZMA)) are an annual awards night celebrating excellence in New Zealand music and have been presented annually since 1965.

Year	Nominee / work	Award	Result	Ref.
1965	"Ill Forgive You Then Forget You"	Single of the Year	Nominated	
2020	Dinah Lee	New Zealand Music Hall of Fame	inductee	

=== Go-Set Pop Poll ===
The Go-Set Pop Poll was coordinated by teen-oriented pop music newspaper, Go-Set and was established in February 1966 and conducted an annual poll during 1966 to 1972 of its readers to determine the most popular personalities.

Year	Nominee / work	Award	Result
1966	herself	Female Vocal	2nd
1967	herself	Female Vocal	4th
1968	herself	Female Vocal	3rd

=== Mo Awards ===
The Australian Entertainment Mo Awards (commonly known informally as the Mo Awards), were annual Australian entertainment industry awards. They recognise achievements in live entertainment in Australia from 1975 to 2016. Dinah Lee won one award in that time.

Year	Nominee / work	Award	Result (wins only)
2009	Dinah Lee	John Campbell Fellowship Award	Won

=== RockoNZ ===
Year	Nominee / work	Award	Result	Ref.
2007	Dinah Lee	RockoNZ Rock Hall of Fame	inductee	

== Discography ==
=== Studio albums ===
List of studio albums
Title	Details
Introducing Dinah Lee	Released: December 1964; Label: Viking Records (VP 140); Format: LP
The Sound of Dinah Lee	Released: 1965; Label: Viking Records (VP 149); Format: LP
The Mod World of Dinah Lee	Released: 1966; Label: Viking Records (VP 195); Format: LP
Islands	Released: 2006; Label: Waterfront Records (RR00016B); Format: CD

=== Live albums ===
List of live albums
Title	Details
Live On The Dinah Lee Show (with Tommy Adderley, Lonnie Lee and The Chicks)	Released: 1965; Label: Viking (VP175); Format: LP

=== Compilation albums ===
List of compilation albums
Title	Details
The Best of Dinah Lee (20 Golden Greats)	Released: 1982; Label: Music World (EMS-1092); Format: LP
The Very Best of Dinah Lee	Released: 2001; Label: EMI (7243 5335782 5); Format: CD
1964-67	Released: 2006; Label: Canetoad Records (002); Format: CD

=== Extended plays ===
List of compilation albums
Title	Details
Don't You Know... (with Max Merritt & His Meteors)	Released: September 1964; Label: Viking Records (VE 148); Format: LP
Yeah, Yeah We Love Them All (with Max Merritt & His Meteors)	Released: November 1964; Label: Viking Records (VE 150); Format: LP
Dance to the Blue Beat	Released: 1965; Label: Viking Records (VE 167); Format: LP
Sings the Hits	Released: 1965; Label: Viking Records (VE 170); Format: LP
Johnny	Released: 1965; Label: Viking Records (VE 193); Format: LP
Do The Blue Beat	Released: 1967; Label: His Master's Voice (7EGO-70070); Format: LP

=== Singles ===
Year	Title	Peak chart positions		Album
Year	Title	AUS	NZL	Album
1964	"Don't You Know Yockomo?" (by Diane Lee)^{[A]}	17	1	Don't You Know... EP
1964	"Reet Petite" (by Dinah Lee with Max Merritt & His Meteors)^{[A]}	16	1	Don't You Know... EP
1964	"Do the Blue Beat (The Jamaica Ska)"^{[B]}	16	1	
1964	"Who Stole the Sugar" (by Dinah Lee & The Kavaliers)	64	10	Introducing Dinah Lee
1964	"I'm Walkin" (by Dinah Lee & The Kavaliers)	64	—	Introducing Dinah Lee
1965	"Johnny"	—	—	Johnny EP
1965	"I'll Forgive You Then Forget You"	38	1	The Sound of Dinah Lee
1965	"The Birds and the Bees"	—	—	Sings the Hits EP
1965	"Hey, Chickie Baby"	—	—	The Sound of Dinah Lee
1965	"That's It, I Quit" / "Pushing a Good Thing Too Far"	—	3	Johnny EP
1966	"He Don't Want Your Love Anymore"	—	—	The Mod World of Dinah Lee
1966	"The Right Time"	—	—	The Mod World of Dinah Lee
1966	"Not in This Whole World"	—	—	The Mod World of Dinah Lee
1967	"98.6"	84	—	Non-album single
1967	"Sorry Mama"	—	—	Non-album single
1972	"Tell Him"	—	—	Non-album single
1976	"It Doesn't Matter Anymore"	—	—	Non-album single
1979	"I Can See Clearly Now"	—	—	Non-album single
"—" denotes a recording that did not chart or was not released in that territory.

== Notes ==
A."Don't You Know Yockomo?" was originally released on Viking Records by Diane Lee in August 1964. After the first pressings sold out, Viking released it under the name, Dinah Lee, it was also released in Australia on EMI's label His Master's Voice. It appeared on the EP, Don't You Know... in September and subsequently appeared on her debut album, Introducing Dinah Lee later in the year. Four tracks, including "Don't You Know Yockomo?" and "Reet Petite" had been recorded in the studio with backing by Max Merritt & his Meteors. Merritt and his band were not credited on the first single but were credited on "Reet Petite" in September and on the four-track Don't You Know... EP. "Reet Petite" was not released in Australia until November when it appeared as a double A-sided single.
B."Do the Blue Beat" was originally released on Viking Records by Dinah Lee in September 1964. It was released in Australia on His Master's Voice, as a double-A-sided single with "Reet Petite" in November. It subsequently appeared on her debut album, Introducing Dinah Lee later in the year.

=== Television ===
Year	Title	Role	Type
1956	My Sister and I	Regular role: Sally	TV series UK, 6 episodes
1964; 1965	Sing, Sing, Sing	Herself - Singer/Performer	TV series, 2 episodes
1965	Dinah Lee Special	Herself	TV Special, NZ
1965-1971	Bandstand	Herself - Performer	TV series, 8 episodes
1965	Hollywood a Go Go	Herself - Performer	TV series US, 1 episode
1965	Shindig!	Herself - Performer	TV series UK, 2 episodes
1965	Thank Your Lucky Stars	Guest - Herself	TV series UK, 1 episode
1966	Jimmy	Herself - Performer/Singer	TV series, 1 episode
1966-1967	The Go!! Show	Herself - Performer/Singer	TV series, 8 episodes
1967	Where the Action Is	Herself - Performer/Singer	TV series, 2 episodes
1972	Matt Flinders	Herself - Guest	TV Special
1973; 1975	The Graham Kennedy Show	Herself - Singer sings "Tell Him"	TV series, 1 episode
1974; 1974	The Ernie Sigley Show	Herself - Singer sings "Let Me Be There"	TV series, 1 episode
1974; 1974	The Ernie Sigley Show	Herself - Singer sings "Reet Petite"	TV series, 1 episode
1974	The Paul Hogan Show	Herself - Singer sings "Mockingbird" with Johnny O'Keefe	TV series, 1 episode
1974	The Good Old Days of Rock 'N' Roll	Herself with Johnny O'Keefe	TV Special
1974; 1975	The Ernie Sigley Show	Herself - Singer sings "(Your Love Keeps Lifting Me) Higher and Higher"	TV series, 1 episode
1975	The Graham Kennedy Show	Herself - Singer sings "(Your Love Keeps Lifting Me) Higher and Higher"	TV series, 1 episode
1975	The Ernie Sigley Show	Herself - Singer sings "Zip-A-Dee-Doo-Dah"	TV series, 1 episode
1975	Countdown	Herself - Singer/Performer	ABC TV series, 1 episode
1978	The Mike Walsh Show	Guest - Herself/Performer	TV series, 1 episode
1981	Australian Music Stars of the 60s	Herself - Archive clips	TV Special
1985	25 Years of NZ Television	Herself - Singer sings "Don't You Know Yockomo" / "Do The Blue Beat" / "Reet Petite"	TV Special NZ
1996	Midday with Kerri-Anne	Herself - Guest	TV series, 1 episode
2001	Long Way to the Top	Herself	ABC TV series, 1 episode
2002	Long Way to the Top: Live in Concert	Herself - Performer sings "Don't You Know Yockomo" / "Reet Petite"	ABC TV Concert Special
2003	Give It A Whirl	Herself	TV series NZ, 1 episode 2: "The Swinging Sixties"
2003	Love Is In The Air	Herself	ABC TV series, 1 episode 2: "She's Leaving Home"
2005	Good Morning Australia	Herself & Max Merritt sing "Baby, You Got What It Takes"	TV series, 1 episode
2005	Spicks and Specks	Herself	ABC TV series, 1 episode
2006	Mornings with Kerri-Anne	Guest - Herself with Judy Stone, Lonnie Lee, Johnny Devlin, Little Pattie & Warren Williams	TV series, 1 episode
2007	Concert For Max Merritt	Herself - Singer sings "Don't You Know Yockomo"	TV Concert Special
2009; 2015	RockWiz	Herself - Singer sings "Don't You Know Yockomo"	SBS TV series, 1 episode
2012	Long Way to the Top 10th Anniversary Tour Special	Herself	TV Special
2013	Wrokdown	Guest - Herself	TV series, 1 episode
2015	RockWiz Salutes the Decades: The 60s	Herself - Singer sings "Don't You Know Yockomo" / "How Does It Feel?" with Normie Rowe, Declan Melia & Holiday Sidewinder	SBS TV series, 1 episode
2020	Aotearoa Music Awards	Herself as Inductee	TV Special, NZ
