= The House and Garden Show =

- Genre: Lifestyle
- Starring: Valerie Cooney; Brian Henderson
- Country of origin: Australia
- Original language: English

Original release
- Network: TCN-9
- Release: 11 June – 20 August 1958

The House and Garden Show is an Australian daytime television series which aired on Wednesdays on Sydney station TCN-9 from 11 June to 20 August 1958.

Starring Valerie Cooney and Brian Henderson, the series, aimed at the housewives, had an unusual format. Though not the mentioning the series by name, an article in Australian Women's Weekly described the format. Cooney and Henderson played a newlywed couple furnishing an old house, and got in character for their parts. The set consisted of a living room, a kitchen, and a workshop.

The series was replaced on TCN's schedule by The Nock and Kirby Show, which was named after the sponsor, a now-defunct retail store.

It is not known if any kinescope recordings exist of the series.
