= Australia's Most Wanted =

Television series (1988–1999)

- Genre: Factual
- Based on: America's Most Wanted
- Presented by: Don Willesee (1988 pilot); Bryan Marshall (1989); Ann Sanders (1993); Sarah Henderson (1994); Roger Climpson (1997–1998); Hugh Riminton (1999); Kim Watkins (1999)
- Voices of: Alastair Duncan
- Country of origin: Australia
- Original language: English
- No. of seasons: 6 (Seven Network); 1 (Channel Nine)

Production
- Running time: 60 minutes
- Production company: Grundy Television

Original release
- Network: Seven Network (1988–1989, 1993–1994, 1997–1998); Nine Network (1999)
- Release: 17 February 1988 – 22 November 1999

Related
- Wanted (2013)

Australia's Most Wanted is a television program based on the format made popular by America's Most Wanted. It was screened on the Seven Network as a regular series from 1989 until 1998.

== History ==
The show was often in the headlines due to its graphic crime scene re-enactments which many deemed too distressing for the show's 7:30pm Monday timeslot.

After the Seven Network cancelled the series in early 1999, the Nine Network created their own version of the format later that year. It did not pull great ratings and was cancelled after nine episodes. In this version, two cases were shown per show and each were 24 minutes long with six ad breaks throughout and was broadcast from 8:30 pm to 9:30 pm every Monday night from 6 September to 1 November 1999. One of the episodes, "Funeral for a Princess", was about the Murder of Belinda Williams at her Elizabeth Street home in Buninyong, Victoria. This is still a "Cold Case" as of 2026.

== Presenters ==
Featured presenters on the various incarnations of the show included:

- Don Willesee – 1988 pilot
- Bryan Marshall – 1989
- Ann Sanders – 1993
- Sarah Henderson – 1994
- Roger Climpson – 1997–1998
- Alastair Duncan – Voiceover (Seven Network)
- Hugh Riminton and Kim Watkins – 1999 (Nine Network)

During 1993, the regular New South Wales Police representative was Senior Constable Denise Behringer. Jackie Forsyth, the wife of murdered police constable Peter Forsyth, worked as a special reporter in the Nine Network version.

== Wanted ==
In 2013, Network Ten re-booted the series calling it Wanted. The hosts were Sandra Sully and Matt Doran. The show was not a success and was cancelled two months later.
