= The Teenage Show =

- Also known as: The Teenage Hour
- Genre: Music television
- Presented by: John D'arcy
- Starring: Heather Horwood; Jack Kelleher; Gaynor Bunning
- Country of origin: Australia
- Original language: English

Production
- Running time: 60 minutes

Original release
- Network: HSV-7
- Release: 25 October 1958 – 1960

The Teenage Show, also known as The Teenage Hour, is an Australian music television series which aired on Saturdays from 25 October 1958 to 1960 on Melbourne station HSV-7.

== Background ==
The live series was a successor to Teenage Mailbag, and episodes ran for about an hour (though per TV listings, some episodes aired in a 55-minute time-slot). Heather Horwood, Jack Kelleher, and Gaynor Bunning were regulars. Bands also appeared, including The Moontones and The Rockets. The archival status of the series is unknown. In one episode, an Aboriginal boxer named George Bracken sang, and made enough of an impression to be signed by a label to release a single.

== See also ==
- Teen Time, which aired on Sydney station ATN-7.
