= Little Pattie =

Little Pattie OAM
- Born: Patricia Thelma Amphlett; 17 March 1949 (age 77); Paddington, Sydney, Australia
- Origin: Sydney, Australia
- Genres: Surf pop; country; adult pop; jazz
- Occupation: Singer
- Instruments: vocals, piano
- Years active: 1962–present
- Labels: EMI/His Master's Voice; Columbia; ATA/Festival; Labrava

Patricia Thelma Thompson (née Amphlett), (born 17 March 1949), known professionally as Little Pattie, is an Australian singer who started her career as a teenager in the early 1960s, recording surf pop, with her backing group The Statesmen. She subsequently went on to record adult contemporary music.

Billed as Little Pattie, she released her debut single in November 1963, "He's My Blonde Headed, Stompie Wompie, Real Gone Surfer Boy" which peaked at No. 19 on the national Kent Music Report and entered No. 2 in Sydney.

She appeared regularly on television variety programs, including Bandstand, and toured as a support act for Col Joye and the Joy Boys. Little Pattie was entertaining troops during the Vietnam War in Nui Dat, Vietnam, as an Australia Forces Sweetheart (in the vein of Lorrae Desmond, Dinah Lee and others), when the nearby Battle of Long Tan began on 18 August 1966.

In 1994 she received the Vietnam Logistic and Support Medal "in recognition of her services in support of the Australian Armed Forces in operations in Vietnam."

== Beginnings ==
Patricia Thelma Amphlett was born in March 1949 in Paddington, New South Wales, and has an older brother, Joe. She is the first cousin of the late Chrissy Amphlett, former frontwoman of Australian band Divinyls. She was educated at King Street Primary School and Sydney Girls High School. She was nicknamed "Little Pattie" at school as she had two taller friends also named Patricia.

At eight years old, she commenced piano lessons with Gwen Parsons, and then singing lessons when 11 years old. Parsons also taught Noeleen Batley, a popular singer called "Australia's Little Miss Sweetheart". Both persuaded her to audition for the Nine Network TV teen variety show Saturday Date, where she was a hit. She first appeared on TV, singing on the Opportunity Knocks series, when she was 13. While a third-year high school student, at the age of 14, she performed weekly at the Bronte Surf Club as lead singer of the Statesmen with Nev Jade, Peter Maxworthy, Duncan McGuire (on bass guitar), Mark Rigby and Peter Walker. Singer-songwriter Jay Justin was impressed with her vocals and recommended her for a recording contract with EMI.

== Teenage singing star ==
Little Pattie's debut single was the double A-sided "He's My Blonde Headed, Stompie Wompie, Real Gone Surfer Boy" / "Stompin' at Maroubra", both co-written by Jay Justin and record producer Joe Halford, which used the surf music style and a dance style craze that was known as 'The Stomp'. It was released by EMI on His Master's Voice in November 1963 when she was aged 14, and reached No. 2 on the Sydney music charts (#1 was the Beatles' "I Want to Hold Your Hand"), No. 6 in Brisbane, and peaked at No. 19 on the national Kent Music Report. Little Pattie left school in early 1964, and released her debut album, The Many Moods of Little Pattie on EMI/His Master's Voice. She had further hits on the Sydney charts with "We're Gonna Have a Party Tonight" (#18 in March), "Pushin' a Good Thing Too Far" (#28 in March 1965) and "Dance Puppet Dance" (#9 in October).

Her popularity saw her voted as Australian Female Singer of the Year in 1965. She appeared frequently on television variety programs, including Bandstand, Saturday Date, An Evening With and Sing, Sing, Sing.

Little Pattie regularly toured supporting Col Joye & the Joy Boys, with Judy Stone, Cathy Wayne and international star Sandie Shaw. The Joy Boys included Joye's brothers Kevin Jacobsen on piano and Keith Jacobsen on bass guitar.

On 16 August 1966, 17 years old and 147 cm (4 ft 10 in) tall, Little Pattie became the youngest and shortest person to entertain troops during the Vietnam War. Along with Col Joye & the Joy Boys she performed three concerts each day in Nui Dat. She was singing onstage backed by the Joy Boys when the Battle of Long Tan started on 18 August less than 4 kilometres (2.5 mi) away. Although organisers had promised her safety, she was evacuated from the area before the completion of her scheduled performances.

During the third show I was given the sign, which of course is the fingers across the throat, which in show business means you better finish. We were very swiftly evacuated by Iroquois helicopters. We could see the jungle where the battle was well and truly taking place and I remember that instinctive... that feeling of – this is very bad; this is dangerous. This is going to be a sad night, and indeed it was. You know, 17-year-old thoughts and through 17-year-old eyes, I guess, but I could see thousands and thousands of orange lights, which of course was the gunfire, and I'll never forget it. Never.

— Patricia Amphlett, 17 August 2009, Radio Australia Today

In the days after the battle, Joye and Little Pattie visited injured soldiers in hospital to comfort and sing to them. In 1994 she received the Vietnam Logistic and Support Medal in recognition of her services in support of the Australian Armed Forces in operations in Vietnam. From 1966, Little Pattie was performing solo in cabarets and clubs, she continued releasing singles and albums with EMI until 1970, and then signed with Joye's ATA recording label and management group. She subsequently appeared on several TV shows in America, including The Ed Sullivan Show.

== Later career ==
As Little Pattie entered her twenties, she continued her career moving into adult contemporary music. During the 1972 Australian Federal election campaign she sang with other entertainers including Joye and Judy Stone in the Australian Labor Party's "It's Time" TV commercial, which featured future Prime Minister, Gough Whitlam. Styled as Pattie Amphlett from 1972, she released singles and albums on ATA / Festival Records and by 1977 had moved into country music. In 1973, she married Keith Jacobsen (Joy Boys' bass guitarist, ATA record producer and manager) and continued to perform on television and in clubs. Amphlett parted from Keith in 1984 and married Lawrie Thompson (a drummer) in 1986.

Her repertoire included swing tunes from Gershwin, Rodgers and Hart, and Cole Porter. In 1990, she toured China as vocalist for veteran jazz musician Graeme Bell and his Allstars. As Patricia Thompson, she became an active unionist in the entertainment industry, and a vocal teacher, later coaching Nikki Webster before her performance at the 2000 Summer Olympics in Sydney. She has taught at a number of Sydney high schools: Burwood Girls High School, St. Joseph's College, Hunters Hill, Mercy College, Chatswood and Saint Ignatius' College, Riverview.

In 2001 EMI re-released a compilation album, 20 Stompy Wompy Hits, which featured her early songs. The ABC-TV series Long Way to the Top was broadcast in August 2001. Little Pattie featured on Episode 1, "Bed of a Thousand Struggles 1956–1964", where she discussed her early surf music and 'The Stomp' dance craze. The TV series inspired the Long Way to the Top national concert tour during August–September 2002, which featured a host of the best Australian acts of the 1950s, 1960s and 1970s including Little Pattie and Col Joye and the Joy Boys. In 2004, General Peter Cosgrove invited her to be patron of FACE (Forces Advisory Council on Entertainment) and she was invited to go to Iraq to perform for Christmas 2005 and New Year 2006. She performed at the "Salute to Vietnam Veterans" held at the Australian War Memorial in Canberra on 19 August 2006.

In addition to her music career, Little Pattie was a member of the Council for the Australian War Memorial from 1995 until 1998, and received an Order of Australia Medal in 2003 for her services (as national President) to the Media, Entertainment and Arts Alliance and (as vice-president) to Actors' Equity. She has been on the Federal Executive of the Australian Council of Trade Unions (ACTU). In 2000 The Sydney Morning Herald included her on a list of the 'century's most loved faces', and she was included in a 1998 issue of Australian stamps featuring pop and rock acts.

On 27 August 2009, Little Pattie was inducted into the Australian Recording Industry Association (ARIA) Hall of Fame alongside Kev Carmody, The Dingoes, Mental As Anything and John Paul Young. She was inducted by her cousin, Christina Amphlett of Divinyls, with former Australian Idol star, Lisa Mitchell performing "He's My Blonde-Headed, Stompie Wompie, Real Gone Surfer Boy".

She is currently a singing teacher at various high schools in Sydney, including St Joseph's College and Burwood Girls High School. As from October 2023 Little Pattie was performing on the nostalgia circuit as the Good Old Days of Rock'n'roll, with fellow veterans, Digger Revell, Dinah Lee and Lucky Starr.

== Personal life ==
In 1973, Little Pattie married Joy Boys' bass guitarist and ATA record producer and manager Keith Jacobsen, brother of Colin (Col Joye) and Kevin Jacobsen. Keith and Little Pattie parted in 1984 and she subsequently married Lawrie Thompson in 1986.

== National honours ==
Little Pattie received a Medal of the Order of Australia on 9 June 2003 for her services to the Media, Entertainment and Arts Alliance (as National President) and to Actors Equity (as vice-president). On 27 August 2009, Little Pattie was inducted into the Australian Recording Industry Association (ARIA) Hall of Fame alongside Kev Carmody, The Dingoes, Mental As Anything and John Paul Young.

== Discography ==
Releases by Little Pattie unless otherwise indicated:

=== Albums ===
List of albums, with Australian chart positions
Title	Album details	Peak chart positions
Title	Album details	AUS
The Many Moods of Little Pattie	Released: 1964; Format: LP; Label: His Master's Voice (OCLP-7621)	—N/a
Pattie	Released: 1965; Format: LP; Label: His Master's Voice (OCLP-7651)	—N/a
Little Things Like This	Released: 1965; Format: LP; Label: His Master's Voice (OCLP-7666)	—N/a
The Best of Little Pattie	Released: 1968; Format: LP; Label: Columbia Records (OSX-7877); Compilation album	—N/a
I Will Bring You Flowers (as Pattie Amphlett)	Released: 1972; Format: LP; Label: Ata Records (SATAL-934579)	-
Sunshine of My Life (as Pattie Amphlett)	Released: 1974; Format: LP; Label: Ata Records, Mushroom Records (L-35292)	-
Only if You Want to (as Pattie Amphlett)	Released: 1977; Format: LP; Label: Ata Records, Mushroom Records (L-36298)	-
A Little Bit of Country (as Pattie Amphlett with Col Joye)	Released: 1978; Format: LP; Label: Pisces Records (L 27031)	86
20 Stompie Wompie Hits!	Released: 1980; Format: LP, Cassette; Label: EMI Music (EMY.504); Compilation album	-

=== Extended plays ===
Title	Details
Little Pattie	Released: 1964; Format: 7-inch EP; Label: His Master's Voice (7EGO 70044)
Pushin' a Good Thing Too Far	Released: 1965; Format: 7-inch EP; Label: His Master's Voice (7EGO 70050)
Dance Puppet Dance	Released: 1965; Format: 7-inch EP; Label: His Master's Voice (7EGO 70057)
I'll Eat My Hat	Released: 1967; Format: 7-inch EP; Label: His Master's Voice (7EGO 70077)

=== Singles ===
Year	Title	Peak chart positions		Album
Year	Title	Go-Set	KMR	Album
1963	"He's My Blonde-Headed, Stompie Wompie, Real Gone Surfer Boy" / "Stomping at Maroubra" (by Little Pattie & the Statesmen)^{[A]}	—	19	Little Pattie
1964	"We're Gonna Have a Party Tonight" (by Little Pattie & the Statesmen)	—	41	The Many Moods of Little Pattie
1964	"He's My Boy"	—	71	The Many Moods of Little Pattie
1964	"Surfin' Time Again"	—	91	The Many Moods of Little Pattie
1965	"Pushin' a Good Thing Too Far"	—	34	Pushin' a Good Thing Too Far EP
1965	"Dance Puppet Dance"	—	29	Dance Puppet Dance EP
1965	"My Love"	—	—	Little Things Like This
1965	"Game of Love"	—	—	Little Things Like This
1966	"Never Gonna Love Again"	—	—	Non-album single
1966	"Don't Walk Away"	—	—	Non-album single
1966	"Let Me Dream"	—	81	Non-album single
1966	"With Love from Jenny" (by Bryan Davies & Little Pattie)	—	88	Non-album single
1967	"I'll Eat My Hat"	38	45	I'll Eat My Hat
1967	"If He Would Care"	—	—	Non-album single
1967	"I Knew Right Away"	—	—	Non-album single
1967	"Let Me Down Lightly"	—	—	Non-album single
1968	"Sunshine Boy"	—	—	Non-album single
1968	"Love Is a Happy Thing" (by Grantley Dee & Little Pattie)	—	53	Non-album single
1969	"Gravitation"	—	67	Beautiful in the Rain
1969	"Someone Out There"	—	—	Beautiful in the Rain
"—" denotes a recording that did not chart or was not released in that territory.

Year	Title	Peak chart positions		Album
Year	Title	Go-Set	KMR	Album
1969	"The Penthouse"	—	—	Beautiful in the Rain
1971	"April Fool"	—	—	Non-album single
1972	"Save Me" (by Pattie Amphlett)	—	—	I Will Bring You Flowers
1972	"Carolina" (by Pattie Amphlett)	—	—	I Will Bring You Flowers
1973	"What's Your Mama's Name" (by Pattie Amphlett)	—	—	Non-album single
1974	"Kentucky Blues" (by Pattie Amphlett)	—	—	Sunshine of Your Life
1976	"Only If You Want To" (by Pattie Amphlett)	—	61	Only If You Want To
1977	"You'll Never Know" (by Pattie Amphlett)	—	—	Only If You Want To
1977	"What Am I Gonna Do?" (by Pattie Amphlett)	—	—	Only If You Want To
1980	"Ain't Nothing Gonna Keep Me from You"	—	—	Non-album single
"—" denotes a recording that did not chart or was not released in that territory.

=== Charity singles ===
List of charity singles
Title	Year	Peak chart positions	Notes
Title	Year	AUS	Notes
"I Touch Myself" (as part of the I Touch Myself Project)	2014	72	The I Touch Myself Project launched in 2014 with a mission to encourage young women to touch themselves regularly to find early signs of cancer.

=== Film ===
Year	Title	Role	Type
1988	Breaking Loose: Summer City II	Moondoggy (as Little Patty Amphlett)	Feature film

=== Television (as self) ===
Year	Title	Role	Type
1964	Ampol Stamp Quiz	Singer (as Little Pattie)	1 episode
1964	Teen Time	Singer (as Little Pattie)	1 episode
1965–1968	Bandstand	Singer (as Little Pattie)	9 episodes
1966–1967	The Go!! Show	Singer (as Little Pattie)	10 episodes
1970	The Ed Sullivan Show	Singer (as Little Pattie)	1 episode
1970	Sounds Like Us	Singer (as Little Pattie)	1 episode
1972	Carry On Spike in Australia	Singer (as Little Pattie)	TV special
1973	The Bert Newton Show	Singer (as Little Pattie)	1 episode
1973	Matt Flinders and Friends	Singer (as Little Pattie)	2 episodes
1973–1975	The Graham Kennedy Show	Singer (as Little Pattie)	3 episodes
1974–1975	The Ernie Sigley Show	Singer (as Little Pattie)	5 episodes
1975	The Norman Gunston Show	Singer (as Little Pattie) (with Norman Gunston)	1 episode
1976	Bandstand '76	Singer (as Little Pattie)	1 episode
1976; 1977	Countdown	Singer (as Little Pattie)	1 episode
1977	Countdown	Singer (as Little Pattie)	1 episode
1978	Young Talent Time	Singer (as Little Pattie)	1 episode
1980	Countdown	Singer (as Pattie Keith)	1 episode
1980; 1981	The Don Lane Show	Singer (as Pattie Keith / Little Pattie)	2 episodes
1981	The Mike Walsh Show	Singer (as Pattie Keith / Little Pattie)	1 episode
1982	The Daryl Somers Show	Singer (as Little Pattie)	1 episode
1985	Natural Causes	Patricia Amphlett	TV film
1988	The N.S.W. Royal Bicentennial Concert	Singer (as Little Pattie)	TV special
1993–2005	Good Morning Australia	Singer (as Little Pattie)	
2002	Long Way to the Top: Live in Concert	Singer (as Little Pattie)	Concert special
2012	Long Way to the Top 10th Anniversary Concert Special	Singer (as Little Pattie)	TV special
2016	Australian Story	Self	1 episode
2024	Anzac Day Concert	Singer (as Little Pattie)	TV special
2025	Anzac Day Sunrise Concert	Singer (with Normie Rowe)	TV special

== Notes ==
A."He's My Blonde-Headed, Stompie Wompie, Real Gone Surfer Boy" / "Stompin' at Marourbra" was originally released as a double A-sided single by Little Pattie & the Statesmen in November 1963. Both tracks appeared on the EP, He's My Blonde Headed Real Gone Stompie Wompie Surfer Boy in December and subsequently appeared on the album, The Many Moods of Little Pattie in 1964.

== Awards and nominations ==
Year	Award	Category	Recipient	Result
1966	The Go-Set Pop Poll by Go-Set	Best Female Vocal	Little Pattie	4th
1967	The Go-Set Pop Poll by Go-Set	Best Female Vocal	Little Pattie	5th
1968	The Go-Set Pop Poll by Go-Set	Best Female Vocal	Little Pattie	4th
2009	ARIA Awards	ARIA Hall of Fame	Little Pattie	Inductee
2009	Mo Awards	John Campbell Fellowship Award	Little Pattie	Won
2018	Australian Women in Music Awards	Lifetime Achievement Award	Patricia Amphlett	Awarded
2024	Australian Women in Music Awards	AWMA Honour Roll	Patricia Amphlett	Awarded

== Honours and awards ==
Vietnam Logistic and Support Medal

Medal of the Order of Australia (OAM)
