= Sandy Scott (singer) =

Australian singer

- Born: Kevin Gilcrist; 1941 (age 84–85); Bondi, New South Wales, Australia
- Occupations: Singer, theatre performer television compere,
- Label: CBS Records

Keith Gilchrist (born 1941), known professionally as Sandy Scott, is an Australian singer, musical theatre performer and television compere. He was a regular guest on the television music program Bandstand and released many records, including the top 25 hit "Wallpaper Roses".

== Early life ==
Gilchrist was born in 1941 in Bondi, the only son of English migrants. He attended Double Bay Public School and then Cleveland Street High School before working in a bank.

== Career ==
When Gilchrist started singing with local bands, his neighbour, disc jockey Bob Rogers, suggested he change his name to Sandy Scott. After appearing on television shows like Six O'Clock Rock and the Johnny O'Keefe Show, Scott signed a ten-year deal to appear exclusively on Bandstand.

Signing with CBS Records in 1963, Scott released three singles before signing with the Jacobsen family's ATA Records. His biggest hit was "Wallpaper Roses" which reached #4 in Sydney. His album Great Scott, It's Sandy achieved gold status.

Scott would go on to appear in cabaret and musical theatre.

In 1971, Scott had a short residency as host of the Australian music show The Sound of Music. In 1984, he took over as host of the television quiz show Family Feud. In 1979, Scott hosted the game show $10,000 Winner Circle.

== Personal life ==
Scott married his manager Carolyn Jacobsen, the sister of singer Col Joye, in 1981. They have two sons.
