= June Dally-Watkins =

Australian model (1927–2020)

June Dally-Watkins OAM
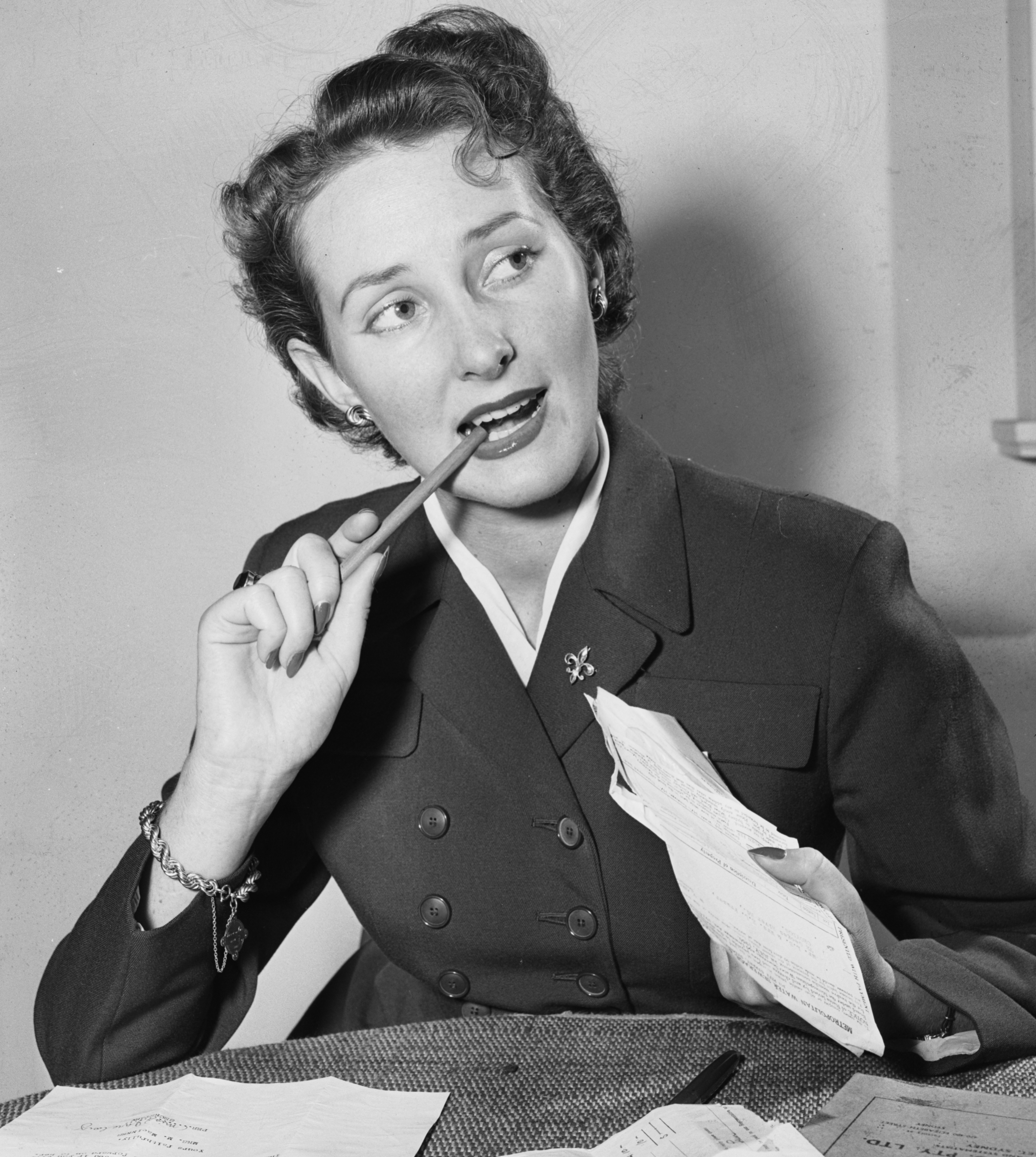
- Portrait of June Dally-Watkins, Sydney, December 1950
- Born: June Marie Skewes; 13 June 1927; Sydney, New South Wales, Australia
- Died: 22 February 2020 (aged 92); Sydney, New South Wales, Australia
- Occupations: Model; businessperson; etiquette coach
- Years active: 1950–2020
- Height: 164 cm (5 ft 4 1/2 in)
- Political party: Christian Democrats

June Marie Dally-Watkins OAM (née Skewes; 13 June 1927 – 22 February 2020) was an Australian businesswoman and fashion model, recognised by the Australian honours system as an entrepreneur. In 1950 she started a personal-development school in Sydney to train young women in etiquette and deportment. A year later, she started Australia's first model agency and modelling school, and later established a Business Finishing College. She later became a public proponent of etiquette and elocution, and frequently commented on those topics in the media.

In 1993, Dally-Watkins received an Order of Australia Medal for her contribution to business.

In 2014 she featured on the popular Australian television show Bogan Hunters on the 7mate channel, where she provided information relating to etiquette to series winners.

In 2019 she taught etiquette to women in China.

== Early life ==
Dally-Watkins was born in Sydney in June 1927 with the birth name June Skewes. Her mother, Caroline May Skewes, came from a family of farmers in the village of Watsons Creek, close to Tamworth, New South Wales. Her father, whom she did not meet until later in life, was a businessman named Bob Monkton, who had met Skewes while on a rabbit-hunting expedition in Watsons Creek. Former army captain and wine salesman David Dally-Watkins married her mother and adopted her in 1940, after which she assumed his name, becoming June Dally-Watkins. The family moved to Sydney in 1940, where Dally-Watkins attended the Willoughby Girls High School, but Caroline's marriage to David was short-lived, and she and Dally-Watkins returned to live in Tamworth in 1942 amidst threat of a Japanese invasion of Australia.

== Career ==
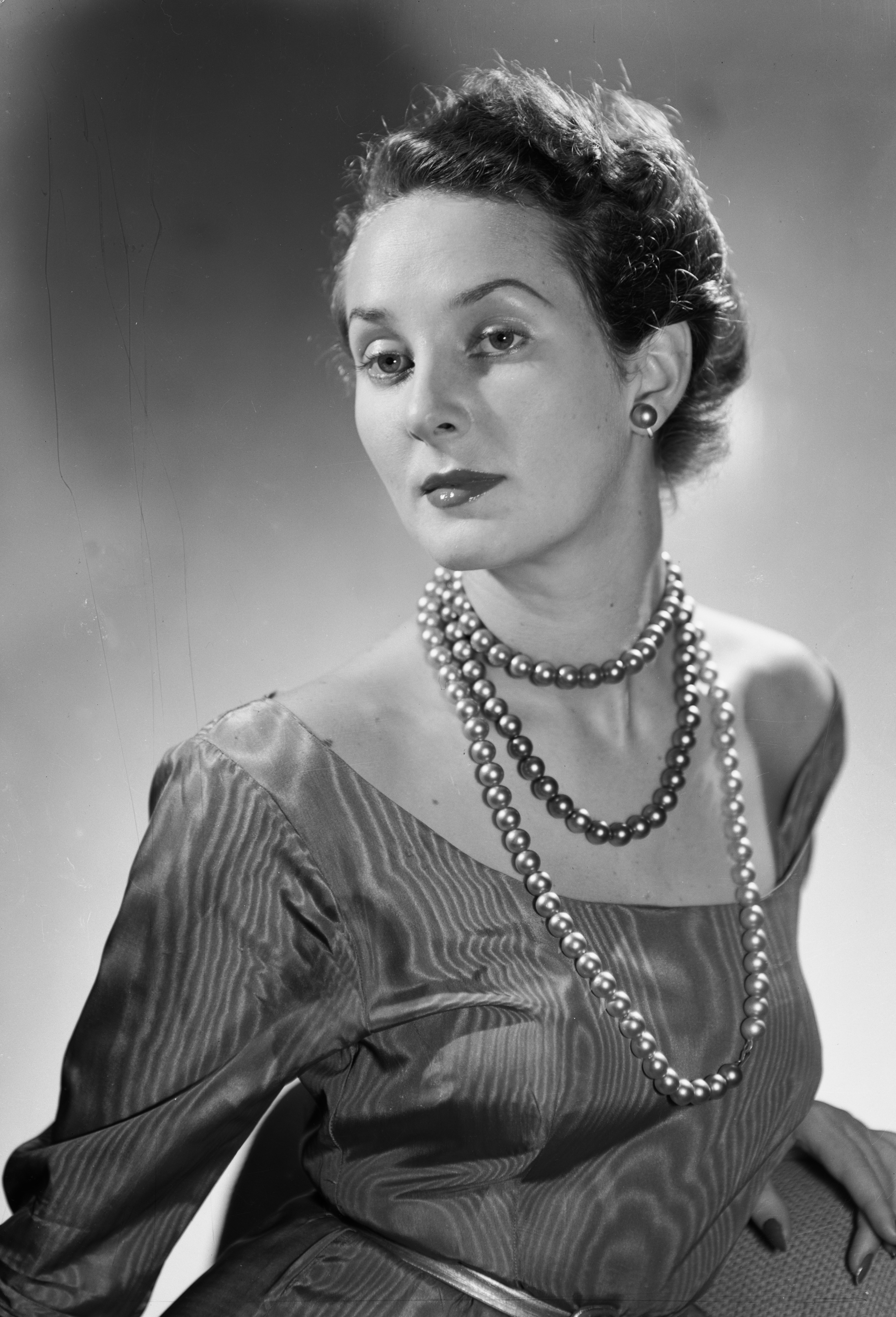
Portrait of June Dally-Watkins, Sydney, March 1949

In 1944 Tamworth-based photographer Jan Solomons performed a photoshoot with Dally-Watkins, after which he suggested to her mother that her appearance could lead her to a career in modelling. Acting on this advice, the pair moved back to Sydney, where Dally-Watkins was appointed to a modelling job at Farmers & Co Department Store, (acquired by Myer in 1961). Dally-Watkins later described her appearance in the 1940s as resembling that of a milkmaid, but her success grew through the decade and in 1949 she won the Australian Model of the Year award. In 1960 she was a regular panelist on the Sydney advice television series Teenage Mailbag.

In 1950, after a visit to New York City to research the latest developments in fashion, Dally-Watkins founded a school of deportment and etiquette. She then went on to start her own modelling agency, as well as a business college.

In later life, Dally-Watkins expanded her etiquette coaching to China, establishing a programme called Look of Success in collaboration with a Chinese partner. The programme ran a series of courses, using venues such as luxury hotels.

== Personal life ==
Dally-Watkins had a brief relationship with American actor Gregory Peck. In 1953, she married John Clifford, a naval officer, but they separated in 1968, finalizing in 1969. The couple had four children; two sons and two daughters.

She died on 22 February 2020, aged 92.
