= Jay Justin =

- Born: Jay Justin McCarthy; 1 May 1940; Australia
- Died: 3 September 2024 (aged 84)
- Genres: Rock, surf pop
- Occupation: Singer-songwriter

Jay Justin McCarthy (1 May 1940 – 3 September 2024) was an Australian rock singer and songwriter. He had a top ten hit with "Proud of You" (written by Justin and Joe Halford) which earnt him Australia's first silver record. Early singles he released include "Sweet Sensation", "Why Don't You Try?" and "Promise Me". Justin's song writing credits include "My Blond Headed Stompie Wompie Real Gone Surfer Boy" and "We're Gonna Have a Party Tonight" (both co-written with Halford) for Little Pattie, an artist he is credited with discovering.
