= The Hepparays =

Australian band (1957–1963)

- Also known as: Lucky Starr and The Hepparays
- Origin: Sydney, New South Wales, Australia
- Genres: Rock n roll, country
- Years active: 1957–1963
- Label: Festival
- Past members: Tony Caperero; Bruce Gurr; Lucky Starr; Dave Taylor; Owen Smith

The Hepparays was an Australian rock n roll music group which formed in 1957 with Tony Caperero on lead guitar, Bruce Gurr on piano, Lucky Starr (aka Les Morrison) on lead vocals and rhythm guitar, Dave Taylor played bass and Owen Smith played drums and percussion. Starr had met his bandmates on the train on his way to work at a power station. Their initial gigs were playing instrumentals in a gym while people exercised.

In 1959 the group issued one of Australia's first rock n roll instrumental singles, "Xmas Rock Medley". In March 1962 they released the novelty single, "I've Been Everywhere", which name drops 94 Australian locations. It peaked at No. 1 on the Sydney, Brisbane and Adelaide singles charts, No. 2 in Melbourne and No. 4 in Perth. Starr and the song's writer, Geoff Mack, travelled to the United States where an Americanised version written by Mack became a hit for Hank Snow. By early 1963 The Hepparays had disbanded and when Starr returned to Australia later that year he pursued a solo career.

== Discography ==
- "Sentimental Journey" "When You Come Back To Me" "Baby Be Mine" "Baby Don't Lie" 1960
