= Accent on Youth (TV series) =

- Genre: Musical variety
- Presented by: John Goodson; Brian Henderson
- Country of origin: Australia

Production
- Production location: Studio TCN-9 at Willoughby, New South Wales

Original release
- Network: Nine Network
- Release: 25 January 1958 – October 1958

Accent on Youth is an Australian music variety television series that aired briefly on the Nine Network in 1958, from 25 January to around October, on Sydney station TCN-9. It evolved into a new series titled Bandstand, based on the United States series American Bandstand, which debuted shortly after Accent on Youth ended. Originally presented by John Godson, it quickly acquired TV news anchor Brian Henderson as new host. A music series aimed at teenagers, it evolved from the Nine's former music program TV Disc Jockey series. Broadcast on Saturdays, Accent was originally a 30-minute show aired at 6:00 pm, later moved to 2:30 pm and expanded to an hour at 2:00 pm.
