= Byz (disambiguation) =

Byz (born 1984) is a Swedish hip hop musician.

Byz or BYZ may also refer to:

- Abbreviation for Byzantium (now İstanbul, Turkey)
  - Abbreviation for Byzantine text-type, a type of manuscript in New Testament textual criticism
- Big Byz, a fictional flying city in the 2011 science fiction novel S.N.U.F.F.
- Banaro language, spoken in Papua New Guinea
- An office of the National Weather Service in Billings, Montana, U.S.; see List of National Weather Service Weather forecast offices
- Commune of Buyenzi, a commune in Burundi
- BYZ, a component of the Fei–Ranis model of economic growth

== See also ==
- Adana Toros BYZ, a volleyball club based in Adana, Turkey
- Biz (disambiguation)
