= Bandstand (TV program) =

1958–1972 Australian music TV series

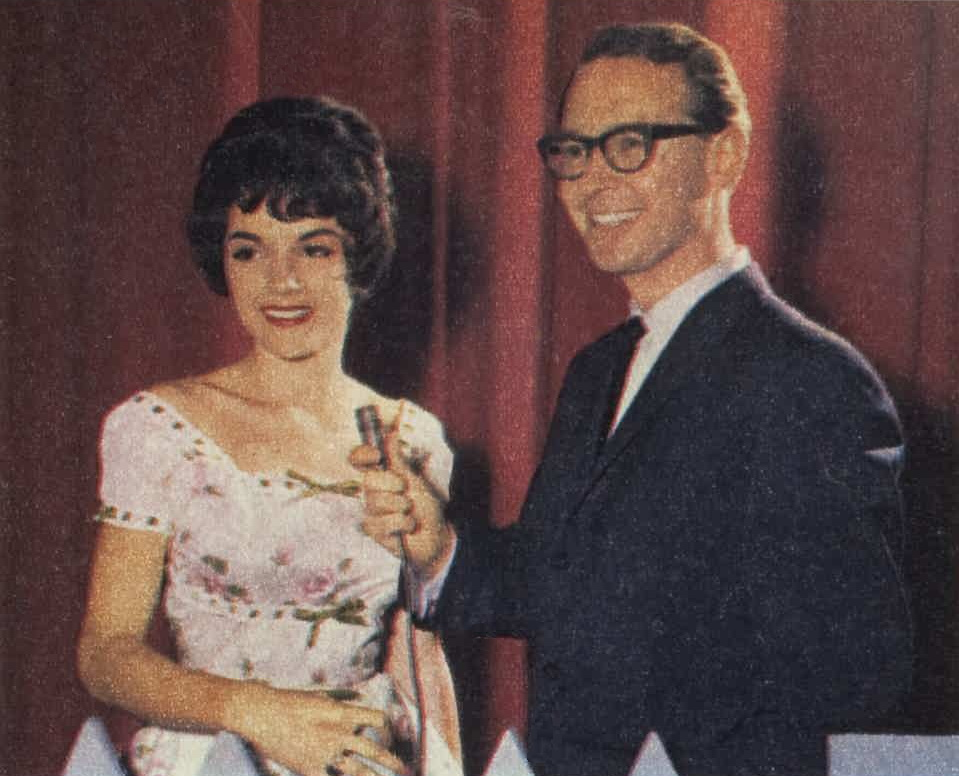
- Singer Patsy Ann Noble with host Brian Henderson on Bandstand in 1960.
- Also known as: Brian Henderson's National Bandstand
- Genre: Music television
- Created by: Bruce Gyngell; Mayfield B. Anthony
- Based on: American Bandstand by WFIL-TV
- Presented by: Brian Henderson
- Country of origin: Australia
- Original language: English
- No. of seasons: 15

Production
- Producers: Warwick Freeman (1958–1966); Ray Newell (1966–1968); Brian Morelli (1970–1972)
- Production location: Sydney
- Running time: 55 minutes
- Production company: TCN Productions

Original release
- Network: TCN-9 (1958–1963); Nine Network (1963–1972)
- Release: 15 November 1958 – 17 June 1972

Related
- Accent on Youth

Bandstand is an Australian live pop music, variety television program screened from November 1958 to June 1972. Featuring both local and international music artists, and produced in-house at the studios of the Nine Network in Willoughby, New South Wales, it was originally broadcast only in New South Wales, It became a national program in the early 1960s as the network expanded into other Australian states. The host of Bandstand for its entire existence was radio presenter and television newsreader Brian Henderson.

Although unrelated, the program was based on the concept of the American pop music show American Bandstand.

== Founding ==
Bandstand was created in November 1958 by television executive Bruce Gyngell in consultation with Mayfield B. Anthony. The host for virtually the entire run was Brian Henderson, who was also a local newsreader from January 1957. From 1960 it developed a national profile as the Nine Network was created to link affiliate stations in other Australian cities.

The network previously broadcast a pop music television program, TV Disc Jockey, from June 1957 to February 1958. Its host was John Godson, with each episode filmed in front of about 40 teenagers, who "listen to the records, rock-'n-roll, drink vast quantities of Coke, and generally have fun under the eye of the TV camera." In March 1958 TV Disc Jockey was replaced by Accent on Youth, with Henderson as its host, and by May 1958 he was the most popular local identity with the station's viewers. The program was renamed as Bandstand and Henderson continued as its host until its last episode on 17 June 1972. By then he was chief news reader and remained in that position until retirement in November 2002.

== Synopsis ==
=== The Bandstand Family ===
Bandstand is closely associated with a core group of pop performers, who regularly appeared on the program, which became known as the Bandstand Family. Over the years they included Col Joye, Little Pattie, Warren Williams, Lucky Starr, Sandy Scott, Bryan Davies, Dinah Lee, Johnny Devlin, Laurel Lea, Judy Stone, the De Kroo Brothers, Digby Richards, Robyn Alvarez, the Bee Gees, the Allen Brothers (a duo of the unrelated, Peter Allen and Chris Bell), Helen Reddy, Lana Cantrell, Cathy Wayne, The Delltones, Pat Carroll and Olivia Newton-John. The Bandstand Family toured Australia and were recorded on albums. Most of the artists were signed with Festival Records – Gyngell's old employers.

=== Crew ===
The musical director was Bob Young; all the band tracks and vocal performances were pre-recorded at Natec Sound Studios in Bligh Street Sydney. Its Audio Director was Max Alexander who also worked for Channel Nine.

Bandstand had three producer-directors over its timespan. The original was Warwick Freeman who was responsible for its development and building its image. Second was Ray Newell who carried on the tradition. Brian C. Morelli took over in 1969 he returned the programme to live vocals and successfully produced the program on location including the Australiana Pioneer Village, Wilberforce NSW and in Singapore and Malaya, the Sidney Myer Music Bowl Melbourne for the King of the Pops Award night. He also instigated the Bandstand Awards. The categories were voted on by all of the Network stations, Australia wide, who transmitted Bandstand. As well, under Morelli's leadership, he continued the Junior Bandstand annual series and introduced a teenage series entitled Midi-Bandstand. The program continued until the final broadcast, with Henderson, on 17 June 1972.

=== Attempted revivals ===
An attempt was made in 1976, by the Nine Network, to revive the program with a new host, Daryl Somers as Bandstand '76. Its format was based on the BBC production, Top of the Pops, and ran for two years. The change in music tastes however gave this type of format a limited life. Morelli was engaged again for the 1976–1978 series, it was produced by the Reg Grundy group and featured popular music groups and soloists including former Six O'Clock Rock host, Johnny O'Keefe, as well as original Bandstand family members Laurel Lea and Little Pattie now known as Pattie Keith. Normie Rowe even performed on the 1970s modern version having returned from his service in Vietnam war that Daryl Somers was now the host for. New release international artists' promotional films were also integrated.

The Swedish quartet ABBA, who were first introduced to Australia in 1975 by Molly Meldrum on Countdown, appeared on Bandstand in 1976 as part of the initial revival of Bandstand, ABBA were brought to Australia to film the Bandstand special The Best of ABBA. They also appeared on an episode of the program which was shown the week before the special went to air. This appearance included a short interview with Daryl Somers and a performance of "Mamma Mia".

=== Legacy ===
In 2019, TV Week listed Bandstand at #101 in its list of the 101 greatest Australian television programs of all time, which appeared in its monthly TV Week Close Up publication. The magazine cited Brian Henderson as a major reason as to why the program became a "Saturday staple".

== Home media ==
Umbrella Entertainment has released, in conjunction with Nine Network, a series of "The Best of Bandstand" DVD packs, each with selections from two years' programs.

- Volume One, 1960–1962 (three discs, re-released as Volume Five, 2014) includes The De Kroo Brothers, The Delltones, The Allen Brothers, Patsy Ann Noble, Lana Cantrell, Jimmy Little, Col Joye, Lucky Starr, Judy Stone, John Laws and Ian Turpie, as well as touring American stars.
- Volume Two, 1963–1964
- Volume Three, 1965–1966 (five discs) with Billy Thorpe, Dinah Lee, Helen Reddy, Jacki Weaver, The Easybeats and Johnny O'Keefe, with international stars the Rolling Stones, Tom Jones, Jerry Lee Lewis and others.

== See also ==
- List of Australian music television shows
- Six O'Clock Rock
