= The Bryan Davies Show =

- Genre: Music television
- Starring: Bryan Davies
- Country of origin: Australia
- Original language: English

Production
- Running time: 60 minutes

Original release
- Network: ABC Television
- Release: 1962 – 1963

The Bryan Davies Show is an Australian television series which aired from 1962 to 1963 on ABC Television. The 60-minute series was produced in Sydney, and was a music show starring singer Bryan Davies. Regulars included the Don Burrows Sextet and the Alan Dean Singers. The archival status of the series is not known, given the varied survival rates of ABC programming of the 1960s.

== See also ==
- Six O'Clock Rock
