= TV Disc Jockey =

Australian music television series

- Genre: Music television
- Presented by: John Godson
- Country of origin: Australia
- Original language: English

Production
- Production location: TCN-9 at Willoughby, New South Wales

Original release
- Network: Nine Network
- Release: June 1957 – February 1958

Related
- Accent on Youth

TV Disc Jockey is an early Australian television music program which was notable, as it later evolved to become the Australian version of Bandstand. It aired on the Nine Network's TCN-9 from June 1957 to February 1958. The series originally consisted of host John Godson playing records (with the visual consisting of the record going round), later a live band joined and then the series began to accompany the records by inviting young people into the studio to dance to the music. In 1958 it changed its title to Accent on Youth.

Although kinescope recording had been invented, it is not known if any of the live episodes were recorded, and the series is possibly lost (Hit Parade, a Seven Network series which started 1957 in which hit recordings were danced to and lip-synced by the cast, does have preserved episodes, as do later 1950s variety series like The Bobby Limb Show (1959–1961) which featured live music).
