= Lucky Starr (singer) =

Australian entertainer (born 1940)

- Also known as: Les Starr
- Born: Leslie William Morrison; 29 December 1940 (age 85); Sydney, New South Wales, Australia
- Genres: Rock and roll; pop; country
- Occupations: Singer; musician; television presenter
- Instruments: Vocals; rhythm guitar
- Years active: 1957–present
- Label: Festival
- Formerly of: The Hepparays

Leslie William Morrison (born 29 December 1940), known professionally as Lucky Starr, is an Australian pioneer rock and roll, pop and country music singer, guitarist and television presenter. His most popular single, "I've Been Everywhere", appeared in early 1962, which peaked at number one in Sydney. Starr became well known through his many TV appearances on shows such as Bandstand and Six O'Clock Rock, in which he briefly hosted taking over from Johnny O'Keefe, he was the first star to entertain troops in Vietnam.

== Early life ==
Lucky Starr was born as Leslie William Morrison in 1940. His father was a motor mechanic and his mother was a housewife, and he had a younger sister and an adopted older sister (who was his cousin but adopted into the family when her parents died). He attended Canterbury High School before starting an apprenticeship as an electrician.

== Career ==
=== The Hepparays ===
Two-and-a-half years later he began his rock and roll career in 1957 as Les Starr, lead singer and rhythm guitarist, of the Hepparays in Sydney. Other members were Tony Caperero on lead guitar, Bruce Gurr on piano, Dave Taylor played bass guitar and Owen Smith provided drums and percussion. Starr recalled how, "the guitarist in his band taught him [how to play] in five months." After winning several talent quests, "someone idly punned that he was 'a lucky Starr'."

Late in 1959, as Lucky Starr, he signed as a solo artist to Festival Records, and in December he released a four-track extended play, Sentimental Journey. For his early work he used the Hepparays as his backing band. He followed with four singles in the next year.

=== Television performing and presenting ===
He was a regular performer on television music and variety shows, Bandstand and Six O'Clock Rock, and took over from Johnny O'Keefe as host of the latter for a brief period in 1960, while O'Keefe was touring the United States.

=== Controversy ===
In May 1960, Morrison, aged 19, was involved in a romance with touring Mouseketeer, Cheryl Holdridge, who was under 16. In May 1963, he recalled, "We corresponded when she went back to the States, and I decided then to follow her, somehow. Once, in 1961, I waited up all night to phone her when she was recovering from a tonsils operation. But we are not 'in love' any more, I guess."

=== Albums and singles ===
Starr released his cover version of the novelty, tongue-twisting single, "I've Been Everywhere", in early 1962. It was written by Geoff Mack, and name-drops numerous Australian towns. It peaked at number one in Sydney in April. "Spinner" from The Biz described the track, "It's a hard hitting novelty number with a slight C and W flavour. Full of gimmicks it features high velocity lyrics in which Lucky recites 120 towns in the Commonwealth... [He] sings each verse in one breath and you'll wonder how he does it when you hear it." Adapted to American towns, it became a United States country music hit for Hank Snow after being released in September of that year.

Starr released a compilation album, I've Been Everywhere, in June 1962, which included his early singles and their B-sides. "Spinner" opined, "[it shows his] versatility to the foil, which is evident in the tracks, 'Candy Pink Lips', 'Suspense' and "Sweet Georgia Brown'. Other tracks include: 'Heart-Break', 'Way Down Yonder in New Orleans', 'I See You as an Angel' and others. In our opinion this LP is worthy of a place in the libraries of both young and the young at heart alike — it's a beauty." According to the journalist, "[he] has worked at his profession perfecting his musicianship, taking voice training, learning acting and dancing — in a word, learning enough to make the most of his 'break' when it came." In July of that year he issued a four-track EP, Lucky's Been Everywhere, with his four versions of "I've Been Everywhere": the Australian one, the US one, the British one and a newly written New Zealand one.

=== Touring the US ===
During 1963, he travelled to the US where "[he] played the Nevada circuit, opening in mid-1963 at the Mapes Hotel Casino Room, Las Vegas." According to The Australian Women's Weekly's Robin Adair the tour was organised by US entertainer, Norman Kaye (of the Mary Kaye Trio). Starr signed with local label, Dot Records, which released three singles, including "Poor Little Jimmy Brown", however "proposed American movie roles and major record deals never happened." He returned late that year to Australia and appeared in Once Upon a Surfie, a Christmas-themed surfing musical alongside "Dig Richards, Jackie Weaver, Bryan Davies, Jay Justin, Rob EG, Jan Green and The Delltones."

Starr issued another solo album, The Silver Spade Digs Lucky, in 1964. He subsequently toured "the USA, New Zealand, the Philippines, Hong Kong, Malaysia, Taiwan, Japan, Vietnam and Italy." According to Daily Mercury's correspondent, "[he was] the first Australian performer to entertain the troops in Vietnam; in fact paying his own way there and made five subsequent trips into the war zone." During the late 1960s Starr performed as a country musician "and took his travelling show around the Australian bush." In 1980 he was inducted into the Australian Country Music Hall of Fame with their Hands of Fame.

=== 21st century ===
In September 2015, Starr released a re-working of "I've Been Everywhere" titled, "We're Going Everywhere... On the Old Hume Highway". He has two children and a grandchild. As of July 2015 he was still performing regularly. As from October 2023 Starr was performing on the nostalgia circuit as the Good Old Days of Rock'n'roll, with fellow veterans, Digger Revell, Little Pattie and Dinah Lee.

== Discography ==
=== Albums ===
- I've Been Everywhere (June 1962) [Festival Records]

(FL 30807)

- The Silver Spade Digs Lucky (1964) [Festival Records]
- I Am The Words

(1971) [RCA Victor) (SP-152)

- Big Wheels

(1974) [RCA Camden] (VCL1-0015)

- Wheels

(1976) [RCA Australia] (VAL1-0111)

- Old Friends

(1977) [RCA Australia] (SCD 499060)

- Mister Truckdriver

(1978) [RCA Victor] (VAL1-0165)

- Blueberry Hill

(2022) [New Note Music]

=== Extended plays ===
- Sentimental Journey (December 1959) Festival Records
- Lucky's Been Everywhere (July 1962) Festival Records

=== Singles ===
- "Somebody Touched Me" (January 1960)
- "The Big Hurt" (March 1960)
- "Wrong" (May 1960) Sydney charts: No. 40
- "Yeah That's How (Rock'n'Roll was Born)" (September 1960) Sydney charts: No. 31
- "Someone Else's Roses" (March 1961) Sydney charts: No. 37
- "I've Been Everywhere" (early 1962) Sydney charts: No. 1 NZ charts: No. 7
- "June in Junee" (1962)
- "Hot Rod" (1962)
- "Mule Skinner Blues" (1963)
- "Come on In" (1963)
- "Poor Little Jimmy Brown" (1964)

== Awards ==
=== Mo Awards ===
The Australian Entertainment Mo Awards (commonly known informally as the Mo Awards), were annual Australian entertainment industry awards. They recognise achievements in live entertainment in Australia from 1975 to 2016.

Year	Nominee / work	Award	Result (wins only)
2008	Lucky Starr	Hall of Fame	inducted
