= Teenage Mailbag (1960 TV series) =

Australian television series

- Genre: Panel discussion
- Presented by: Roger Climpson
- Starring: June Dally-Watkins; John O'Grady
- Country of origin: Australia
- Original language: English

Original release
- Network: TCN-9
- Release: 1960

Teenage Mailbag is an Australian television series which aired in 1960 on Sydney station TCN-9. It was a panel discussion series on teenage issues. Roger Climpson was the host. Teenagers would send in letters with problems and questions which would be discussed by a panel of three, with June Dally-Watkins and John O'Grady being the regular panellists, along with a guest panellist.

== Reception ==
The Australian Women's Weekly called the series "a well-rounded, entertaining show".

== See also ==
- Leave it to the Girls
