= Col Joye =

Australian pop singer-songwriter, musician (1936–2025)

Col Joye AM
- Joye in 1957

Background information
- Born: Colin Frederick Jacobsen; 13 April 1936; East Hills, New South Wales, Australia
- Died: 5 August 2025 (aged 89) Sydney, New South Wales, Australia
- Genres: Pop; rock and roll; country
- Occupations: Singer; songwriter; musician; businessman
- Instruments: Guitar; vocals
- Years active: 1957–2021
- Formerly of: Colin Joye and the Joy Boys

Colin Frederick Jacobsen (13 April 1936 – 5 August 2025), better known by his stage name Col Joye, was an Australian pioneer rock and pop singer-songwriter, musician and entrepreneur with a career spanning almost sixty-seven years, starting from the late 1950s.

Joye was a teen idol and the first Australian rock and roll/pop singer to have a number one record Australia-wide, and had a string of chart successes in the early Australian rock and roll scene, performing with his band the Joy Boys (formerly KJ Quintet).

As a pioneer of the genre Joye toured in Lee Gordon's rock 'n' roll shows and featured regularly on television shows including Johnny O'Keefe's Six O'Clock Rock and Brian Henderson's Bandstand.

== Early life and education ==
Colin Frederick Jacobsen was born in East Hills, Sydney, New South Wales, on 13 April 1936. (Note: Some sources originally stated his birth year as 1937, however all obituaries state his age as 89, hence the 1936 birth year.) Joye left school at 14 and, prior to stardom, worked as a jewellery salesman.

== Musical career ==
Jacobson started performing and recording in the late 1950s with his backing band, originally called the KJ Quintet, the predecessor of what would become the Joy Boys, which included his brothers Kevin and Keith.

As Col Joye he enjoyed a string of hits on the local and national singles charts of Australia beginning in 1959. Joye's first single, "Stagger Lee" was a cover of the Lloyd Price US original. However, his third single "Bye Bye Baby" (written by American Frank McNulty) reached No.3 on the Australian Kent Music Report charts in 1959, followed by "Rockin Rollin Clementine" also peaking at No. 3. His fifth single, "Oh Yeah Uh Huh", became his most successful, making him the first Australian pop artist to hold a No.1 record nationwide. He also had other charting singles, including "Yes Sir That's My Baby" peaking at No. 5 nationally.

Backing vocals on "Bye Bye Baby" were by male trio The Sapphires. The Sapphires were Duke Finlay, Tony Garrick and Ned Hussey, initially starting as a Sydney vocal trio in 1957, Barry Carroll was added in 1960 to round out their sound (much like The Delltones) and they were used as backing group for many Australian artists on studio recordings in the early 1960s. They also appeared in Lee Gordon concert shows, and wrote some songs. (Note: Not to be confused with a Melbourne instrumental group of the same name, active between 1958 and 1964, led by guitarist Charles Osbourne.)

In mid-October 1959, Joye and The Joy Boys performed in shows titled Lee Gordon's 1959 Rock'n'Roll Spectacular. The concerts at the Sydney Stadium were edited into a film called Rock 'n' Roll which premiered on 30 October. Four of the five songs performed by Joye were included on the album Songs That Rocked the Stadium, released December 1959. The film, thought lost but rediscovered in 2020, includes rare footage of a 1950s rock and roll concert in Australia.

Joye and The Joy Boys performed regularly on the television program Bandstand. They toured Australia with fellow acts that were featured on the program, including Judy Stone, the De Kroo Brothers, Sandy Scott and Little Pattie. They also appeared on Johnny O'Keefe's Six O'Clock Rock. In the mid-1960s, the band entertained troops in Vietnam and Borneo and recorded several songs in Japan.

Joye's popularity leveled off after the changes to the music scene associated with the rise of surf music and the British Invasion, and it was not until 1973 that he had another hit record, with the country music song "Heaven Is My Woman's Love", reaching No. 1 on the Go-Set charts that year.

== Entrepreneurship ==
During the period between personal musical successes in the late 1950s and early 1960s, Col and Kevin Jacobsen built an influential entertainment management, publishing and recording business, including ATA Studios in Glebe, New South Wales.

This business worked with developing and promoting artists including the Bee Gees, and their brother Andy Gibb recording a number of songs with Joye as producer around 1975.

Prior to his success with Icehouse, Iva Davies met Col Joye and obtained employment writing lead lines for popular songs including songbooks of Cold Chisel and Elvis Costello. The band Iva Davies with Afghan also made a number of early 7" singles in Joye's recording studios in 1975-76.

The promotions company, Jacobsen Entertainment, continued into the 2000s, with the brothers remaining as principal directors.

== Personal life and death ==
In 1990, while pruning a neighbour's tree with a chainsaw as a favour, Joye slipped and fell six metres onto brick paving below, striking his head and falling into a coma, as well as sustaining serious lower back and shoulder injuries. Initially given a poor prognosis, he eventually recovered to start performing and touring again in 1998.

Joye died in Sydney on 5 August 2025, at the age of 89.

== Honours, awards and recognition ==
On 8 June 1981, he was appointed a Member of the Order of Australia for his entertainment and philanthropic work. In 1988, the ARIA Music Awards in 1988, inducted Joye into the ARIA Hall of Fame.

| Year | Nominee / work | Award | Result |
|---|---|---|---|
| 1988 | Col Joye | ARIA Hall of Fame | Inducted |

=== Country Music Association Awards (CMAA) ===
In 1974, Joye won a CMAA award for "Top Selling Album of the Year".

| Year | Nominee / work | Award | Result (wins only) |
|---|---|---|---|
| 1974 | Heaven Is My Woman's Love | Top Selling Album of the Year | Won |

=== Mo Awards ===
Joye won two Mo Awards.

| Year | Nominee / work | Award | Result (wins only) |
|---|---|---|---|
| 1980 | Col Joye | John Campbell Fellowship Award | Won |
| 1988 | Col Joye | Most Outstanding Club Act | Won |

=== Others ===
In 1998, Australia Post issued a special-edition set of twelve stamps celebrating the early years of Australian rock and roll, featuring Australian hit songs from the late 1950s to the early 1970s. One of the stamps commemorated Joye, based on the song "Oh Yeah Uh Huh". Australia Post wrote that "Each of them said something about us, and told the rest of the world this is what popular culture sounds like, and it has an Australian accent".

In 2010, "Bye Bye Baby" (1959) was added to the National Film and Sound Archive's Sounds of Australia register. The curator's notes commented that:

There is not a lot to this pop song, written by American Frank McNulty, other than a catchy title hook. The lyrics are about the singer saying goodbye to his girlfriend and how lonely he will be without her until the next time they meet. The original recording was made using a nylon string guitar, bass (wonderfully out of tune in the beginning) and minimalist drums with Col Joye almost whispering the vocals (as he had a cold at the time). This is the released version, with added celeste and 'ooh-ahh' backing vocals from the Sapphires, presumably to give it a little more musical interest.

== Discography ==
=== Studio albums ===
List of albums, with selected chart positions
| Title | Album details | Peak chart positions |
| Title | Album details | AUS |
|---|---|---|
| Jump with Joye | Released: 1959; Format: LP; Label: Festival Records (FM-6010) | —N/a |
| Songs That Rocked the Stadium | Released: 1959; Format: LP; Label: Festival Records (FL-7152) | —N/a |
| The Golden Boy | Released: 1960; Format: LP; Label: Festival Records (FL-7225) | —N/a |
| Joy to the World | Released: 1961; Format: LP; Label: Festival Records (FL-30636) | —N/a |
| Col Joye Sings His Solid Gold Hits | Released: 1961; Format: LP; Label: Festival Records (FL-30644) | —N/a |
| Joyride | Released: 1961; Format: LP; Label: Festival Records (FL-30692) | —N/a |
| Col Joye and the Ballad | Released: 1962; Format: LP; Label: Festival Records (FL-30801) | —N/a |
| Col and Judy with Orchestra (with Judy Stone) | Released: 1962; Format: LP; Label: Festival Records (FL-30901) | —N/a |
| Classics of Rock | Released: 1963; Format: LP; Label: Festival Records (FL-31078) | —N/a |
| Stomp Around the Clock | Released: 1964; Format: LP; Label: Festival Records (FL-) | —N/a |
| Rock'n Roll Classics | Released: 1964; Format: LP; Label: Seven Seas (MH-182) | —N/a |
| Rock Classics No. 2 | Released: 1964; Format: LP; Label: Festival Records (FL-) | —N/a |
| The Exciting Big Beat – The Best Hit Parade | Released: 1965; Format: LP; Label: Seven Seas (SET-29) | —N/a |
| Joy Boys In Tokyo | Released: 1965; Format: LP; Label: Seven Seas (SET-30) | —N/a |
| For the Good Times | Released: 1972; Format: LP; Label: Ata Records (L 25210) | — |
| Heaven Is My Woman's Love | Released: 1973; Format: LP; Label: Ata Records (L 35036) | — |
| For You | Released: 1975; Format: LP; Label: Ata Records (L 35489) | — |
| Truck Stop (with Bob Purtell, Laurie Allen and Jim Cooper) | Released: 1976; Format: LP; Label: Ata Records (L 35943) | — |
| A Little Bit of Country (with Little Pattie) | Released: 1978; Format: LP; Label: Pisces (L27031) | 86 |
| Back to Rock 'n' Roll | Released: 1990; Format: LP, CD; Label: Ata Records (D 30233) | — |

=== Charting compilation albums ===
List of albums, with Australian chart positions
| Title | Album details | Peak chart positions |
| Title | Album details | AUS |
|---|---|---|
| The Very Best | Released: 1980; Format: LP; Label: J&B (JB046) | 47 |
| 20 Most Requested Songs | Released: 1984; Format: LP; Label: J&B (JB174) | 20 |

=== Charting singles ===
List of selected singles with chart positions
| Year | Title | Peak chart positions |
| Year | Title | AUS |
|---|---|---|
| 1970 | "Come into My Life" | 56 |
| 1973 | "Heaven Is My Woman's Love" | 1 |
| 1978 | "Rock Around the Clock" | 94 |

==== Other singles ====
List of singles as featured artist, with selected chart positions
| Title | Year | Peak chart positions |
| Title | Year | AUS |
|---|---|---|
| "The Garden" (as Australia Too) | 1985 | 22 |
