= The Biz (newspaper) =

Newspaper in Fairfield, NSW, Australia, active 1928 - 1972

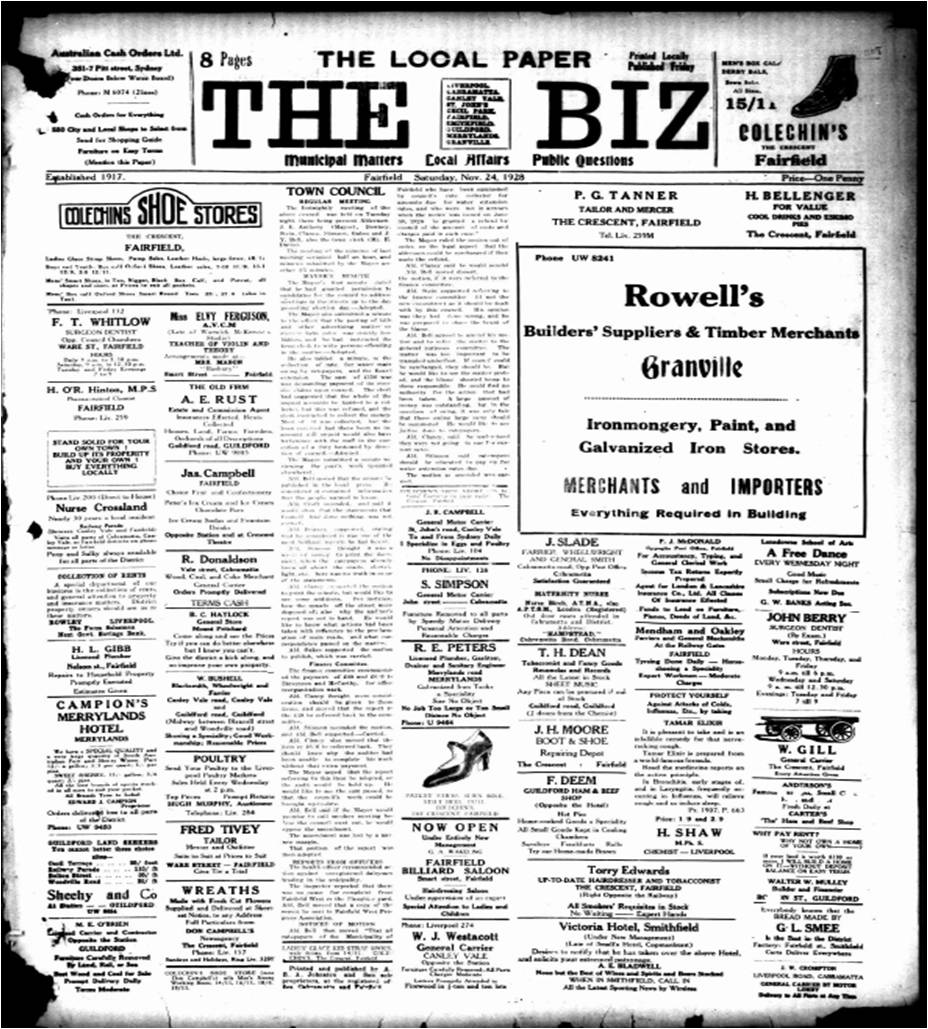
The Biz, 24 November 1928

The Biz was a weekly English language tabloid newspaper published in Fairfield, New South Wales Australia. The paper was first published in 1917 by Albert Henry Johnson. For forty years the publishing house was located in Cabramatta, New South Wales, before being moved to Smart Street, Fairfield. It ceased publication in January 1980. The Biz was digitised in 2012.

== History ==
During the 1930s and 1940s, the paper was printed with a Model 8 Linotype machine made by the Mergenthaler Linotype Company. During the mid 20th century period when The Biz was printed by W. R. Bright and Sons, the paper was printed with a F4503E Elrod strip casting machine manufactured by the Ludlow Typograph Company.

== Digitisation ==
The various versions of the paper have been digitised as part of the Australian Newspapers Digitisation Program project hosted by the National Library of Australia.

== See also ==
- List of newspapers in Australia
- List of newspapers in New South Wales
