= Teen Time =

Australian television series

- Genre: Music television
- Presented by: Keith Walshe; Carol Finlayson
- Country of origin: Australia
- Original language: English

Original release
- Network: ATN-7
- Release: 1959 – 1961

Teen Time was an Australian television series which aired from 1959 to 1961. It was hosted by Keith Walshe and Carol Finlayson, and as was often the case with Australian music television series of the era, it aired on only a single station, in this case ATN-7. The series presented a mix of live music performances and records, and had a live audience. Dig Richards and the R'Jays appeared on Tuesdays, while Warren Williams appeared on Fridays. The Allen Brothers made their television debut on Teen Time in 1959, and later made further appearances.

There are no copies of the series existing to date as TV at the time did not hold copies. They were copied over to save film. The National Film and Sound Archive holds still images, publicity shots and a set of proof shots from the show.

== See also ==
- Hit Parade
- Six O'Clock Rock
- Youth Show
