= Kevin Jacobsen =

Australian entertainment entrepreneur

Kevin Jacobson OAM
- Born: Kevin George Jacobson; 29 July 1939 (age 87); Sydney, Australia
- Occupations: Entertainment entrepreneur, former musician
- Known for: Talent Promotor of Jacobson Entertainment Group; Member of The Joy Boys
- Family: Col Joye (brother), Keith Joye (brother)

Kevin George Jacobsen (born 29 July, 1939) is an Australian entertainment entrepreneur and former musician who is the head of the Jacobson Entertainment Group.

Along with brothers Col Joye and Keith, he was a member of the Australian 1960s band Col Joye and The Joyboys which achieved four No. 1 Top Forty chart hits.

== Roster of artists ==
- The Jacobsen Group of Companies has presented many international artists, including:

Artist
Barbra Streisand
Barry Manilow
Bee Gees
Billy Joel
Bob Marley
Bruce Springsteen
Cyndi Lauper
Grace Knight
John Denver
Julio Iglesias
Kiss
Meat Loaf
Michael Jackson
Olivia Newton-John
Pearl Jam
Peter Allen
Sammy Davis Jr
Shania Twain
Simon and Garfunkel
The Three Tenors
Walt Disney's World on Ice

== Production ==
Jacobsen has also produced theatrical shows such as Disney's Beauty and the Beast, Camelot with Richard Harris, Fame, A Chorus Line, and Dirty Dancing – The Classic Story on Stage.

He was also the executive producer of the musical theatre production The Man from Snowy River: Arena Spectacular.

== Honours ==
Jacobsen was awarded the Medal of the Order of Australia (OAM) in 1985 for his services to the performing arts and entertainment industry.

=== Helpmann Awards ===
The Helpmann Awards is an awards show, celebrating live entertainment and performing arts in Australia, presented by industry group Live Performance Australia (LPA) since 2001. In 2002, Jacobsen received the JC Williamson Award, the LPA's highest honour, for their life's work in live performance.

| Year | Nominee / work | Award | Result |
|---|---|---|---|
| 2002 | Himself | JC Williamson Award | awarded |
