= Brian Henderson (television presenter) =

Australian television presenter (1931–2021)

Brian Henderson AM
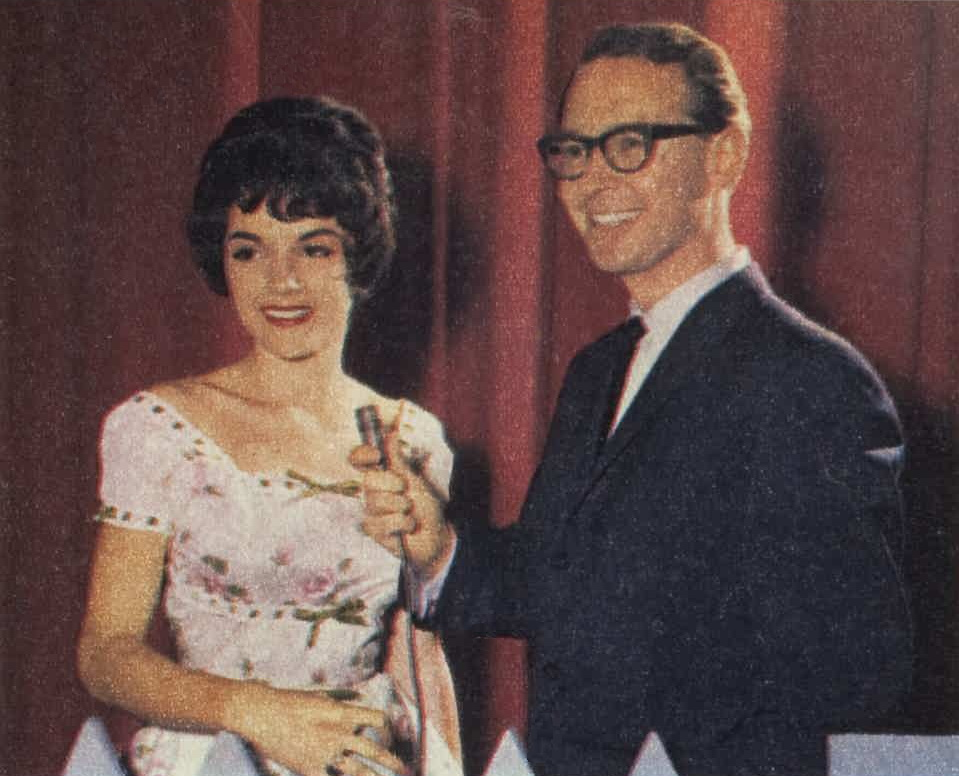
- Henderson hosting Bandstand picture with Trisha Noble
- Born: Brian Weir Henderson; 15 September 1931; Dunedin, New Zealand
- Died: 5 August 2021 (aged 89); Sydney, New South Wales, Australia
- Other name: Hendo
- Occupations: News presenter; radio host; television host
- Years active: 1947–2002; 2012
- Employer: Nine Network at station TCN-9 from 1957–2002 (retirement)
- Known for: Australia's longest-serving TV news anchor; Host of Bandstand
- Spouse: Mardi Henderson (m. 1966)
- Children: 4

Brian Weir Henderson (15 September 1931 – 5 August 2021) was a New Zealand-born Australian radio and television personality and pioneer known for his association with the Nine Network as a television news anchor in Sydney, as well as a variety show presenter and host of music program Bandstand, the local version of the US music program American Bandstand.

Henderson, who started his career in radio, went on to become a long-serving Australian television newsreader, who served as a presenter for some 46 years, having read the news bulletins for Sydney station TCN-9, either on weekends or weeknights, from 14 January 1957 until retiring from TCN-9 on 29 November 2002. His role as weeknight presenter at the time was subsequently given to Jim Waley. TCN-9 bulletins would eventually be relayed to regional New South Wales through Nine's regional affiliate WIN Television.

== Biography ==
=== Early years ===
Henderson was born in Dunedin, on the South Island of New Zealand, on 15 September 1931. His father worked variously as a bus driver and a pastry cook, and served in World War II. Henderson grew up in the South Island, and attended Waitaki Boys' High School. He caught tuberculosis while in high school and spent three years recovering in a hospital. During this time, his interest in broadcasting was piqued when he became resident announcer and disc jockey of the hospital's radio station.

=== Early career ===
Henderson started his professionally career in radio in his native New Zealand working for 4ZB, a local station in Dunedin, when he was 16 years old, initially as a copywriter, before becoming the country's youngest DJ. He went on to work in Wellington at 2ZB.

=== Broadcasting career in Australia ===
Henderson moved to Australia in 1953 and settled in Sydney, New South Wales. He first worked for radio station 2CH before switching to television. After joining the Nine Network, he started presenting Nine News in Sydney from 1957, four months after it was established.

From his first news broadcast in January 1957, Henderson used the tagline "... and that's the way it is", or "the way it is", followed by the date of the broadcast, to sign off after every bulletin, similar to United States newsreader Walter Cronkite.

At the end of his final bulletin, Henderson's voice wavered as he told viewers it was time to watch the news, not present it:

Not the way it was, as has been suggested, but for the last time, the way it is, this Friday the 29th of November, this is Brian Henderson, a sad Brian Henderson, saying not good night, this time, but goodbye.

== Bandstand ==
Henderson whilst serving as a newsreader, hosted the early television music variety program Bandstand from 1958 until 1972, based on the American version hosted Dick Clark but unrelated. The show had a regular roster of stars who became known as the bandstand family and included Col Joye, Judy Stone and Little Pattie

== Retirement ==
A pair of Henderson's familiar dark-rimmed spectacles, worn while reading the news, are in the collection of the Powerhouse Museum in Sydney.

Henderson came out of retirement in 2012 to narrate a documentary for the Foxtel network, The Train: The Granville Rail Disaster, which examined the aftermath of the 1977 rail disaster and the rescue workers' heroism.

== Recognition ==
=== National honours ===
In the 2009 Australia Day Honours, Henderson was named a Member of the Order of Australia (AM) for "service as a pioneer in the television news and entertainment sectors, and as a mentor to aspiring and established presenters, readers and journalists".

=== Awards ===
Award	Association	Year	Work	results
Gold Logie	Logie Awards	1968	Bandstand	Won
Gold Logie Logie Hall of Fame	Logie Award	2013	Lifetime Achievement Award	Won

Henderson won his first TV Week Gold Logie award for Most Popular Personality on Australian Television in 1968. He received a second Gold Logie at the Logie Awards in April 2013 when he was inducted into the Logie Hall of Fame. Industry peers vote for the award and he was the 30th inductee since the award began in 1983. Henderson was on the shortlist in 2010 when it was awarded, posthumously, to Brian Naylor.

The King of Pop Awards were voted by the readers of TV Week. The award started in 1967 and ended in 1978. Henderson won the award for his Contribution to Teenage Television in 1972.

Henderson won a Lifetime Achievement Award at the 2019 Kennedy Awards.

== Personal life and death ==
Henderson was married to Mardi Ozoux from 1966 until his death. Together, they had two children, Nicole and Jodie. He also had two children from his first marriage.

Henderson revealed he had throat cancer in 2014. He previously had other cancers; doctors said his prognosis was good. In February 2020, it was announced that Henderson had kidney cancer and that he had opted not to receive treatment.

Henderson died on 5 August 2021 at his home in Sydney, at the age of 89. A private funeral was held on 16 August, in front of a limited number of family members including his 5 grandchildren (Jess, Jamie, Jade, Thomas and Charles) due to COVID-19 restrictions in place at the time.

Media offices
Unknown	National Nine News Sydney; Weekend presenter 1957–1963	Unknown
Preceded by Chuck Faulkner	National Nine News Sydney; Weeknight presenter 1964–2002	Succeeded by Jim Waley
