= Youth Show =

- Genre: Music television
- Presented by: Keith Walshe
- Country of origin: Australia
- Original language: English

Production
- Running time: 30 minutes

Original release
- Network: ATN-7
- Release: 1959 – 1960

Youth Show is an Australian television series which aired from 1959 to 1960 on Sydney station ATN-7. Hosted by Keith Walshe, it was a music series, with emphasis on teenage talent, particularly artists who had not yet reached stardom. It was later replaced by The B.M.C. Show. The archival status of the series is unknown, given the highly varied survival rates of 1950s Australian television series (with some series, like Autumn Affair, surviving near-intact, while certain other series are completely lost).

Prior to the series being broadcast, a "pilot film" was made of the program.
