= The Bee Gees' concerts in 1967 and 1968 =

1967–68 concert tours by the Bee Gees

1967–68 Tours
- Tour by The Bee Gees
- Poster to the concert in Daly City, California
- Associated album: Bee Gees' 1st; Horizontal; Idea
- Start date: 13 May 1967
- End date: 19 November 1968
- Legs: 4
- No. of shows: 97 in Europe; 16 in North America; 113 total

The Bee Gees concert chronology
- 1967–68 Tours; 2 Years On Tour (1971)

The 1967–68 Tours (also known as The Bee Gees in Concert, Spring Tour '68, North American Tour) are a series of concerts held in 1967 and 1968 by the Bee Gees. The tours promoted their third, fourth and fifth studio albums: Bee Gees' 1st (1967), Horizontal (1968) and Idea (1968). The band's line-up at that time was the Gibb brothers with Colin Petersen and Vince Melouney. Before the tours began, the group were the opening act for Fats Domino in London and Manchester.

== Personnel ==
- Barry Gibb – vocals, rhythm guitar
- Robin Gibb – vocals
- Maurice Gibb – vocals, bass
- Vince Melouney – lead guitar
- Colin Petersen – drums
- Bill Shepherd – conductor

== Opening acts ==
- Procol Harum (Europe, February–March 1968, select dates)
- Dave Dee, Dozy, Beaky, Mick & Tich (Europe, March–May 1968, select dates)
- Grapefruit (Europe, March–May 1968, select dates)
- The Foundations (Europe, April 1968, select dates) (London, Royal Albert Hall)
- Spanky and Our Gang (Anaheim) (North America, select dates)
- Tony Rivers and The Castaways (Wolverhampton, Newport, London [November 1967])
- The Flower Pot Men (Wolverhampton, Newport, London [November 1967])
- Bonzo Dog Doo-Dah Band (Wolverhampton, Newport, London [November 1967])
- Vanilla Fudge (Anaheim)
- Love (Phoenix)

== Setlist ==
The following setlist was obtained from the concert held on 10 August 1968, at the Forest Hills Tennis Stadium in New York City, New York. It does not represent all concerts for the duration of the tours.

1. "New York Mining Disaster 1941"
2. "And the Sun Will Shine"
3. "To Love Somebody"
4. "Jumbo"
5. "The Singer Sang His Song"
6. "I Have Decided to Join the Airforce"
7. "I Started a Joke"
8. "Let There Be Love"
9. "Words"
10. "I Can't See Nobody"
11. "Holiday"
12. "In the Morning"
13. "Really and Sincerely"
14. "Massachusetts"
15. "I've Gotta Get a Message to You"

Encore

16. "Spicks and Specks"
17. "World"

== Tour dates ==
List of 1967 concerts
Date	City	Country	Venue
13 May 1967	Northampton	England	Maple Ballroom
14 May 1967	Nottingham	England	Britannia Rowing Club
14 May 1967	Nottingham	England	Beachcomber Club
25 May 1967	Liverpool	England	Student Auditorium
26 May 1967	Galashiels	Scotland	Galashiels Town Hall
26 May 1967	Selkirk	Scotland	Victoria Hall
27 May 1967	Carlisle	England	Carlisle Market Hall
28 May 1967	Oldham	England	Thing Club
19 June 1967	Wishaw	England	The Belfry
21 June 1967	Gorleston-on-Sea	England	Floral Hall
23 June 1967	Leicester	England	Scraptoft Hall
24 June 1967	Manchester	England	New Century Hall
21 July 1967	Stockholm	Sweden	Palladium
4 August 1967	London	England	Tiles Club
5 August 1967	Dunstable	England	California Ballroom
6 August 1967	Greenford	England	Starlite Ballroom
17 August 1967	London	England	33 Portland Place
21 August 1967	Bath	England	Bath Pavilion
26 August 1967	London	England	Upper Cuts
27 August 1967^{[A]}	Woburn	England	Woburn Abbey
9 September 1967	Chester	England	Clockwork Orange
22 September 1967	Wolverhampton	England	Wolverhampton Civic Hall
27 September 1967	Newport	Wales	University of Wales Auditorium
7 October 1967	Manchester	England	Main Debating Hall
13 October 1967	Rugby	England	Benn Hall
27 October 1967	Rosewell	Scotland	Rosewell Institute
28 October 1967	Coatbridge	Scotland	Coatbridge Town Hall
29 October 1967	Dundee	Scotland	Top Ten Club
1 November 1967	Stevenage	England	Locarno Ballroom
11 November 1967^{[B]}	Rotterdam	Netherlands	Ahoy Hallen Heliport
17 November 1967	London	England	Lewisham Odeon
18 November 1967	London	England	St. Mary's Hall
19 November 1967	London	England	Saville Theatre
19 November 1967	Salisbury	England	Salisbury City Hall

List of 1968 concerts
Date	City	Country	Venue
27 January 1968	Anaheim	United States	Anaheim Convention Center
9 February 1968	Stockholm	Sweden	Stockholm Concert Hall
10 February 1968	Stockholm	Sweden	Stockholm Concert Hall
11 February 1968	Gothenburg	Sweden	Gothenburg Concert Hall
12 February 1968	Oslo	Norway	Sentrum kino
14 February 1968	Copenhagen	Denmark	Falkoner Teatret
15 February 1968	Copenhagen	Denmark	Falkoner Teatret
27 February 1968	Hamburg	West Germany	Musikhalle
28 February 1968	Bremen	West Germany	Stadthalle
29 February 1968	Hanover	West Germany	Niedersachsenhalle
1 March 1968	Stuttgart	West Germany	Liederhalle
2 March 1968	Munich	West Germany	Kongressaal
3 March 1968	Nuremberg	West Germany	Meistersingerhalle
4 March 1968	Frankfurt	West Germany	Jahrhunderthalle
5 March 1968	Münster	West Germany	Münsterlandhalle
6 March 1968	Cologne	West Germany	Kölner Messehalle
7 March 1968	West Berlin	West Germany	Sportpalast
8 March 1968	Braunschweig	West Germany	Stadthalle
10 March 1968	Bern	Switzerland	Festhalle
27 March 1968	London	England	Royal Albert Hall
29 March 1968	Leeds	England	Queens Hall
30 March 1968	Chester	England	ABC Theatre
31 March 1968	Manchester	England	Palace Theatre
1 April 1968	Leicester	England	De Montfort Hall
4 April 1968	Cambridge	England	Cambridge Corn Exchange
5 April 1968	Slough	England	Adelphi Cinema
6 April 1968	Sheffield	England	Sheffield City Hall
7 April 1968	Birmingham	England	Birmingham Hippodrome
10 April 1968	Carlisle	England	ABC Theatre
11 April 1968	Glasgow	Scotland	Green's Playhouse
12 April 1968	Edinburgh	Scotland	ABC Theatre
13 April 1968	Stockton-on-Tees	England	ABC Theatre
14 April 1968	Liverpool	England	Empire Theatre
17 April 1968	Portsmouth	England	Portsmouth Guildhall
18 April 1968	London	England	The Castle
19 April 1968	Hanley	England	Gaumont Cinema
20 April 1968	Bolton	England	Odeon Theatre
21 April 1968	Hull	England	ABC Theatre
22 April 1968	Lincoln	England	ABC Theatre
24 April 1968	Salisbury	England	Odeon Theatre
25 April 1968	Romford	England	Odeon Theatre
26 April 1968	Exeter	England	Odeon Theatre
27 April 1968	Cardiff	Wales	Capitol Theatre
28 April 1968	London	England	Granada Theatre
1 May 1968	Cork	Ireland	Savoy
2 May 1968	Dublin	Ireland	Adelphi Cinema
3 May 1968	Belfast	Northern Ireland	ABC Theatre
1 August 1968	Phoenix	United States	Arizona Veterans Memorial Coliseum
2 August 1968	Los Angeles	United States	Hollywood Bowl
3 August 1968	Daly City	United States	Cow Palace
4 August 1968	San Diego	United States	San Diego International Sports Center
10 August 1968^{[C]}	New York City	United States	Forest Hills Tennis Stadium
14 August 1968	Providence	United States	Rhode Island Auditorium
15 August 1968	Boston	United States	Music Hall
17 August 1968^{[D]}	Bridgeport	United States	Kennedy Stadium
24 August 1968	Detroit	United States	Olympia Stadium
25 August 1968	Chicago	United States	Auditorium Theatre
26 August 1968	Columbus	United States	Ohio State Fair Fairgrounds Grandstand
27 August 1968	Columbus	United States	Ohio State Fair Fairgrounds Grandstand
29 August 1968	Saratoga Springs	United States	Saratoga Performing Arts Center
31 August 1968^{[E]}	Philadelphia	United States	John F. Kennedy Stadium
1 September 1968	Columbia	United States	Merriweather Post Pavilion
6 October 1968	The Hague	The Netherlands	Houtrusthallen
12 October 1968	Stockholm	Sweden	Johanneshovs Isstadion
13 October 1968	Copenhagen	Denmark	K.B. Hallen
31 October 1968	Bremen	West Germany	Stadthalle
1 November 1968	Kiel	West Germany	Opernhaus
2 November 1968	Hamburg	West Germany	Ernst-Merck-Halle
4 November 1968	Münster	West Germany	Münsterlandhalle
5 November 1968	Cologne	West Germany	Kölner Sporthalle
6 November 1968	Essen	West Germany	Grugahalle
8 November 1968	Stuttgart	West Germany	Messehalle Killesberg
10 November 1968	Vienna	Austria	Wiener Stadthalle
11 November 1968	Insbruck	Austria	Messehalle
13 November 1968	Bochum	West Germany	Ruhrlandhalle
14 November 1968	Düsseldorf	West Germany	Messehalle
16 November 1968	Braunschweig	West Germany	Stadthalle
18 November 1968	Munich	West Germany	Kongressaal
19 November 1968	Nuremberg	West Germany	Meistersingerhalle

Festivals and other miscellaneous performances
^{A} Festival of the Flower Children
^{B} Hippy-Happy Festival
^{C} Forest Hills Festival
^{D} Bridgeport Music Festival
^{E} Philadelphia Music Festival
