= List of English artworks in the National Museum of Serbia =

Lady Gavrag Portrait by George Frederic Watts

English Art (British Art) Collection in National Museum of Serbia includes painters usually from the late 19th century, mostly impressionist and post-impressionist. The vast majority of the collection was donated by Prince Paul of Yugoslavia before World War II.The collection has 64 paintings and watercolors and 51 graphics and etchings. They include painters such as Alfred Sisley, Charles Conder, Philip Wilson Steer, Walter Sickert, Hermione Hammond, James Bolivar Manson, Wyndham Lewis, Roger Fry, Duncan Grant, Vanessa Bell and Rowland Fisher, and graphic works from William Hogarth etc.

- George Morland, Stable with Boars
- Clarkson Frederick Stanfield, Sea with Fishermans Sailboats (1862)
- Frank Holl, Return from Walking (1877)
- Alfred Sisley, Barges on the Loing
- Charles Conder, On the beach
- Philip Wilson Steer, Forest
- Ethel Walker, Sea
- Charles Sims (painter), Amor and Woman (watercolor), After Bath (tempera)
- Cedric Morris, North African Landscape
- Walter Sickert, Street in Dieppe, Dieppe
- Hermione Hammond, Trafalgar Square (watercolor)
- Wilfrid de Glehn, Architecture of One Church
- George Clausen, A summer morning
- George Frederic Watts, Lady Garvagh
- John Lavery, Fireplace
- Gwen John, Interior with White Table
- James Bolivar Manson, Still Life with Flowers, View from Houton Sussex
- Christopher Wood (English painter), Still Life with White Vase and Flowers
- Henry Lamb, Square
- Augustus John, Infaint portrait Beatrice
- Duncan Grant, Sunny Countryside, Haystacks
- William Rothenstein, Laurence of Arabia Portrait 1921 (canvas)
- Roger Fry, Nude on the Spring 1921
- Henry Tonks, Man and Woman on Yarn (watercolor)
- Vanessa Bell, Roofs
- John Nash (artist), Ships in Port, Floweres on the Window
- John George Brown, Still Life with Flowers
- Graham Sutherland, Landscape from South Wales
- Rowland Fisher, Mill
