= William Adams (lifesaver) =

English lifesaver, swimmer, and swimming instructor

- William Adams - Gorleston's Hero
- Born: 25 January 1864; Gorleston, England
- Died: 14 October 1913 (aged 49); Gorleston
- Occupations: Bathing hut proprietor, swimming instructor and tinsmith
- Known for: Famous Gorleston lifesaver
- Spouse: Ellen Eliza Adams
- Children: Eight

William Adams (25 January 1864 – 14 October 1913) was a lifesaver, swimmer and swimming instructor from Gorleston on the east coast of England. He made his first rescue at the age of 11 and went on to save a total of 140 lives from drowning. He is one of only four people to have received the Royal Humane Society bronze medal with three clasps. William Adams also has the distinction of appearing twice in the Carnegie Hero Fund Roll of Honour. He was known as "The Hero of Gorleston Pier" and also as "Professor" Adams in recognition of the expert swimming tuition he provided.

== Notable rescues and awards ==
William Adams developed into a highly proficient swimmer at an early age. He made his first rescue when only 11 by saving the life of a young girl who had fallen from the pier into the sea. This event marked the beginning of a lifetime of lifesaving.

He worked as a tinsmith in the winter months but every summer he would return to his alternative occupation as a bathing hut attendant and swimming instructor on Gorleston beach. Although William Adams was not employed as a lifeguard he was close at hand and ready to help if a bather required assistance. He was never a member of a lifeboat crew and instead saved lives by swimming or diving to the aid of the stricken swimmer.

In 1890 William Adams was the proud recipient of the Royal Humane Society's bronze medal for his bravery in rescuing a local lad named Robert Drane. He soon became well known as the "Hero of Gorleston Pier" and reports of his rescues appeared with great regularity in the local, national and also international press.

In 1896 a Norwich man called Rimmington got into difficulties whilst bathing in the sea at Gorleston. A man called Collins, from London, went to his aid but soon also found himself in danger as Rimmington panicked and clutched to him frantically. It was at this point that Adams became aware, swam to the two men and brought them both ashore together on his back. For this "double rescue" William Adams was presented with a row of four bathing huts.

Another famous rescue occurred when Adams swam out to sea and brought safely to shore a rowing boat which contained two couples. The vessel had drifted dangerously out to sea and appeared to be unmanageable by the occupants.

He was honoured on numerous occasions in recognition of his outstanding life saving record. In 1906 the mayor of Great Yarmouth presented William Adams with an illuminated address. The testimonial, signed by 90 subscribers, stated that he had saved 77 lives up to that time.

The 1st of two entries for William Adams in the Carnegie Hero Fund Trust Roll of Honour

== As a swimmer and swimming instructor ==
In 1881 the annual Gorleston Marine Regatta added a 400 yards swimming contest for a gold challenge medal and a silver cup to its programme of events. This event was won by a 17 year old William Adams and he repeated the feat in 1882 and 1883 therefore winning the gold medal outright.

He coached some of the best swimmers of the day and gave lessons to many schools and clubs, acquiring the title of "Professor" Adams in the process. One young pupil who greatly benefited from the swimming tuition Adams provided was Frank Keymer, whose life Adams had saved in 1898 after a particularly perilous rescue. Subsequently, Keymer became a member of the Gorleston Swimming Club of which Professor Adams was instructor. It would seem Adams taught him well, for in an extraordinary coincidence Keymer himself saved a life in 1905.

== Personal life ==
William Adams was born in Gorleston and was the son of Gorleston Trinity House Maritime pilot Abel Adams. William married Ellen Eliza Durrant in 1884 and they brought up a family of eight children together; two daughters followed by six sons. The Great Yarmouth Mercury once recorded that the five eldest sons were all strong swimmers like their father.

== Death ==
William Adams died on 14 October 1913 at the age of 49. He had made his last rescue at Gorleston Beach only a month earlier despite having been in failing health at the time. The Revd. Ritso spoke of this final act of bravery in his moving funeral address:

It was the beginning of the end, but when afterwards his wife gently chided him for his rashness, he said, "Could I stand there and see a man drown?" and in his last hours he told her he did not regret that he had done his duty to the end. Isn't that splendid? Isn't that true heroism? Isn't that complete self-sacrifice?

Reading the Great Yarmouth Mercury account of the funeral it is clear that William Adams had been held in the very highest regard by his fellow townspeople:

The flag was flown at half mast above the grey old tower and on the adjoining Recreation Ground the Gorleston football players wore black armlets as a token of respectful sympathy. Many shops were shuttered.

William Adams dedicated his life to life saving, using his physical strength and swimming prowess to save others. The Great Yarmouth Mercury carried an eloquent tribute:

In all his rescues he always put aside any thought of personal risk, acting on the moment with one thought uppermost, that the life of a fellow creature was in peril. Such characteristics make the true hero, and he was admired and respected by everyone.

From a distance his headstone does not look any different from the others that surround it. However, on closer inspection the depiction of a man diving to the rescue of a drowning figure can be seen. The headstone bears the following inscription:

In loving memory of William Adams who saved 140 lives from drowning.

== Legacy ==
His name was immortalised when a road was named in his honour in 2007

In recent years William Adams’ life story has been shared in a number of ways. He has been the subject of local history exhibitions and lectures, school assemblies, poetry, artwork and even textile design.

The life saving legacy of William Adams was recognised on 28 May 2004 when a Great Yarmouth Local History and Archaeological Society blue plaque was unveiled at his former home, 199 Bells Road. This event was particularly notable as it was the first ever blue plaque to be installed in Gorleston.

On 11 April 2007 his name became immortalised in a road name, William Adams Way. William Adams Way serves as a main route into Gorleston and also as a key access road for the Great Yarmouth third river crossing.

On 13 March 2018 The William Adams, a brand new £2.2 million Wetherspoons pub, was officially opened in Gorleston by the Mayor with four generations of descendants of William Adams in attendance. The decision to name the pub after this local hero was determined by a public vote. In April 2025 The William Adams was named the seventh best Wetherspoon’s pub in the UK in an independent study. Researchers compared the reviews of 869 Wetherspoon pubs and hotels to determine which ones were the public's favourite.

A biography of William Adams has been completed by his Great, Great Grandson and is scheduled for publication in 2026.
