= Gorleston Pavilion =

Theatre in Gorleston-on-Sea, Norfolk, England

Pavilion Theatre and Bandstand, Gorleston
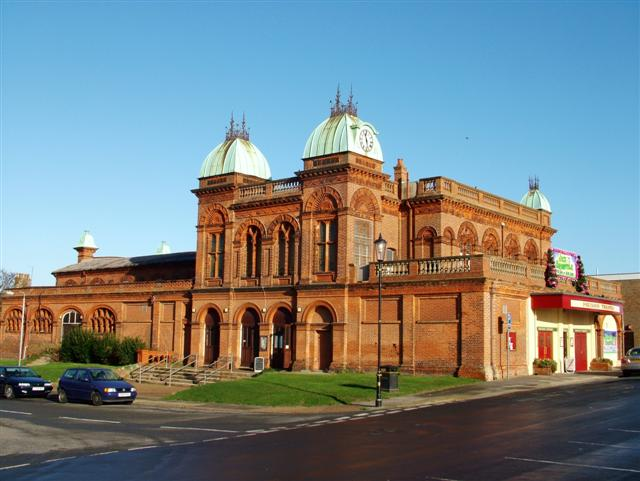
- Interactive map of Pavilion Theatre and Bandstand, Gorleston
- Address: Gorleston-on-sea; England
- Coordinates: 52.571042°N 1.732712°E
- Capacity: 300
- Current use: Active

Construction
- Opened: 1901
- Architect: J W Cockrill

Website
- http://www.gorlestonpavilion.co.uk

Gorleston Pavilion or Pavilion Theatre is located near the mouth of River Yare in the town of Gorleston-on-Sea in the English county of Norfolk. Commonly described as an Edwardian Theatre, it was built in 1898 and was designed by the Borough Engineer J W Cockrill. The auditorium has no rake and there is a balcony at the rear, which is used by the technical staff and is currently closed to the public. The proscenium was rebuilt in 1919. The building contains a large upper room with a balcony providing a view of Gorleston beach and cliffs.

Stage dimensions: Depth: 4.8m (15 ft 9in), Proscenium width = 7.26m (23 ft 10in), Height to grid: 3.96 m (13 ft)
