= Birdie Told Me =

Song by Bee Gees

from the album Horizontal
- Released: February 1968
- Recorded: 30 July, 1 and 10 August, 28 October 1967
- Genre: Soft rock, progressive rock
- Length: 2:19 (mono); 2:23 (stereo)
- Songwriters: Barry, Robin and Maurice Gibb
- Producers: Robert Stigwood, Bee Gees

"Birdie Told Me" is a song by the Bee Gees, recorded for the album Horizontal (1967). It was written by Barry, Robin and Maurice Gibb. The song has a duration of 2 minutes and 19 seconds in mono and 2:23 in stereo.

"Birdie Told Me" was covered by Dodle Best.

== Recording ==
When the band entered Chappell Studios to begin recording the album in earnest, the first song they recorded was "Birdie Told Me". Barry recalls "'Birdie Told Me' is something I think I brought in, really about love on the rebound". "Obviously the person has lost the one he loves, and she's telling him it's going to be alright. A pretty song."

Robin adds,

"It's got a flavour of the late '60s in it, that's the kind of song you would hear from a film of the time. I really love the chorus; it's a very poignant song. The original idea that Barry had for 'Birdie Told Me' came at Chappell Studios, which is the original Chappell Music [Publishers office], but they had a studio upstairs. We used to alternate between there and the IBC Studios in Portland Place, which was just opposite the BBC."

The song was recorded four times, initially at Chappell Studios but completed at IBC Studios. The first version was recorded on July 30, the second version was on August 1, the third version was on August 10 and the final one on October 28.

== Musical structure ==
"Birdie Told Me" would eventually have orchestra and choir in addition to a lead guitar break by Vince Melouney on the repeat of the first verse. The song, played in the key of A, starts with a bass line. The orchestra backing by Bill Shepherd was played in the refrain and the second chorus.

== Personnel ==
- Barry Gibb — lead vocals, backing vocals, acoustic guitar
- Maurice Gibb — bass guitar
- Vince Melouney — lead guitar
- Colin Petersen — drums
- Bill Shepherd — orchestral arrangement
