= Gorleston-on-Sea =

Town in Norfolk, England

Coordinates: 52.5757°N 1.7235°E

- Town
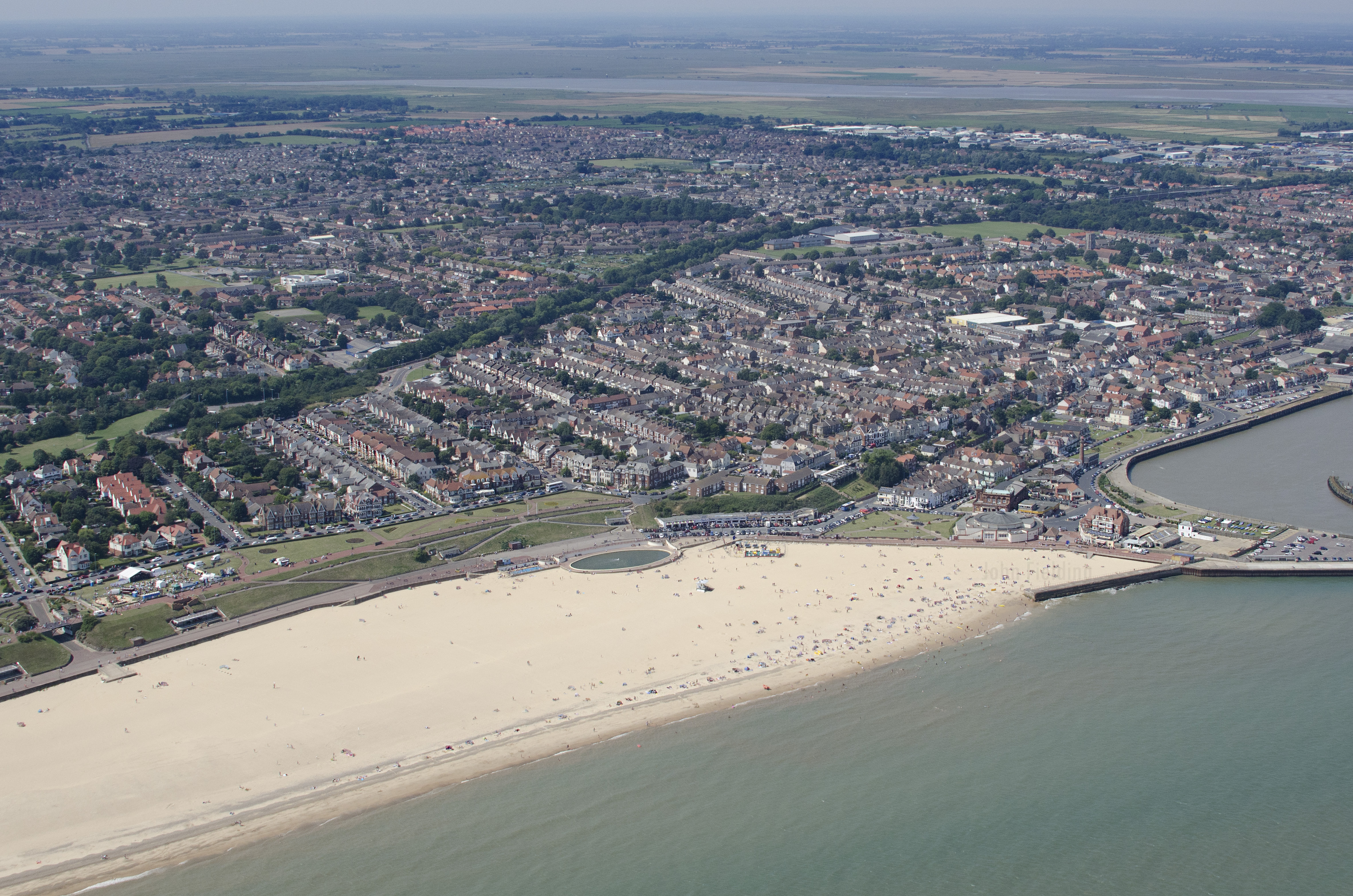
- Gorleston-on-Sea from the south east, with the mouth of the River Yare centre-right and Breydon Water in the far distance

- Location within Norfolk
- Population: 24,470 (Built up area, 2021)
- OS grid reference: TG520040
- District: Great Yarmouth
- Shire county: Norfolk
- Region: East
- Country: England
- Sovereign state: United Kingdom
- Post town: Great Yarmouth
- Postcode district: NR31
- Dialling code: 01493
- Police: Norfolk
- Fire: Norfolk
- Ambulance: East of England
- UK Parliament: Great Yarmouth

Gorleston-on-Sea (/ˈɡɔːrlstən/), historically and colloquially known as Gorleston, is a seaside town in the borough of Great Yarmouth in Norfolk, England. It lies to the south of Great Yarmouth, on the opposite side of the mouth of the River Yare. Historically in Suffolk, it was a port town at the time of the Domesday Book in 1086. It was incorporated into Great Yarmouth in 1836. Gorleston's port became a centre of fishing for herring along with salt pans used for the production of salt to preserve the fish. In Edwardian times the fishing industry rapidly declined and the town's role changed to that of a seaside resort.

== History ==
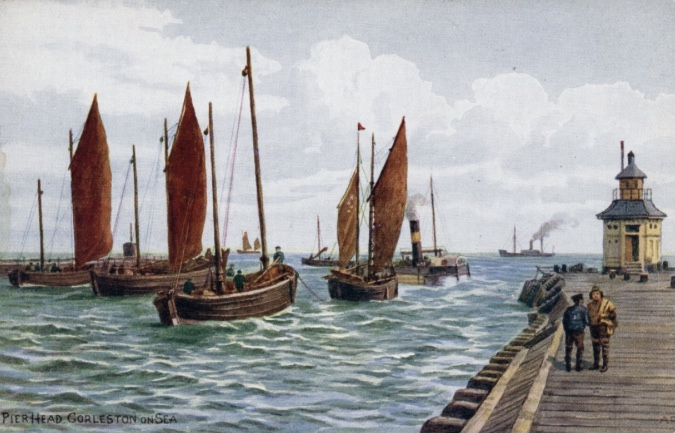
A. R. Quinton, Pier Head, Gorleston-on-Sea, c. 1920

The place-name 'Gorleston' is first attested in the Domesday Book of 1086, where it appears as Gorlestuna. It appears as Gurlestona in the Pipe Rolls of 1130. The first element may be related to the word 'girl', and is probably a personal name. The name could mean "girls' town or settlement", or a variant similar to Girlington in West Yorkshire.

Historically, the town was in the county of Suffolk. In the Middle Ages it had two manors, and a small manor called Bacons. The medieval church of St. Andrew stands in the town and by historical association gives its name to the Gorleston Psalter, an important example of 14th-century East Anglian illuminated art that is now in the British Library in London. At the northern tip of the parish an area known as Southtown (also known as South Town or Little Yarmouth) grew as a suburb to Great Yarmouth, facing it across the Yare.

Gorleston Barracks were established in 1853. There were to be three railway stations in the town on the Yarmouth-Lowestoft Line. The stations on the line were Gorleston-on-Sea, Gorleston North and Gorleston Links, which all closed between 1942 and 1970. The closest railway stations are now Lowestoft and Great Yarmouth.

In the Great Storm of 1987, Gorleston-on-Sea experienced the highest wind speed recorded in the UK on that day, which was 122 mph (196 km/h).

The town is meticulously described in the novel Gorleston by Henry Sutton (Sceptre, 1995) and in Philip Leslie's novels The History of Us (Legend Press, 2009) and What Remains (December House, 2013). Both Sutton and Leslie employ the actual names of roads and retail outlets in their work.

In 2018 a newly built Wetherspoons pub, The William Adams, opened on Gorleston High Street. William Adams made his first rescue at the age of 11 and went on to save some 140 lives in total. The decision to name the pub after this local hero was determined by a public vote. The building is on the old site of GT Motors, formerly the site of the town's Methodist chapel, dating from 1807. Gorleston-on-Sea's Pier Hotel and beach feature as a key location in Danny Boyle's 2019 film Yesterday.

=== Administrative history ===
Gorleston was an ancient parish in Suffolk. Southtown was brought within Great Yarmouth's borough boundaries in 1668, whilst remaining part of the parish of Gorleston. The rest of the parish was added to the constituency of Great Yarmouth in 1832 under the Parliamentary Boundaries Act 1832. Great Yarmouth's municipal borough boundaries were adjusted to match the constituency from 1 January 1836 under the Municipal Corporations Act 1835, since when Gorleston has been administered as part of Great Yarmouth. The borough of Great Yarmouth straddled Norfolk and Suffolk between 1668 and 1891, with the original town north of the River Yare being in Norfolk and Gorleston south of the Yare being in Suffolk. The borough was placed entirely in Norfolk in 1891, although as a county borough Great Yarmouth provided its own county-level services, independent from Norfolk County Council.

Gorleston continued to form a civil parish within the borough of Great Yarmouth until 1974, although as an urban parish it had no separate parish council. In 1951 the parish had a population of 24,984. On 1 April 1974 the civil parish was abolished.

== Education ==
There are a number of primary schools in the area serving Gorleston and the wider locality. Secondary schools include Cliff Park Ormiston Academy, Lynn Grove Academy and Ormiston Venture Academy.

East Norfolk Sixth Form College is in the centre of Gorleston and is one of the largest sixth forms in Norfolk, with about 1,600 students drawn from a wide area.

=== East Anglian School for Deaf and Blind Children ===
The East Anglian School for Deaf and Blind Children (for deaf children and for blind children) was established in Gorleston in 1912 and based there until it closed in 1985. During the Second World War the school was evacuated to Aberpergwm House in Glynneath, Wales. The headmaster's house in Gorleston was severely damaged by bombing in 1941.

== Religious buildings ==
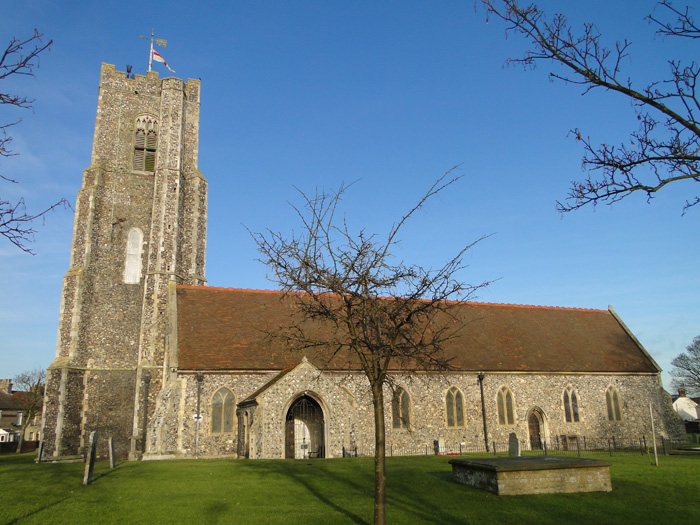
St Andrew's Church, Gorleston

The medieval church of St. Andrew stands in the town and by historical association gives its name to the Gorleston Psalter, an important example of 14th-century East Anglian illuminated art. At the northern tip of the parish an area known as Southtown (also known as South Town or Little Yarmouth) grew as a suburb to Great Yarmouth, facing it across the Yare. On Lowestoft Road in Southtown stands the Church of St Peter, a Roman Catholic church and the only church building designed by Eric Gill. It is a Grade II* listed structure.

== Attractions ==
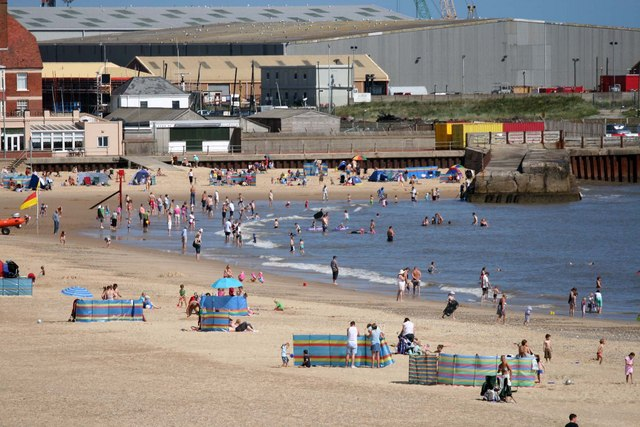
Gorleston Beach, pictured in 2008, is the town's main attraction

The town's main attraction is its sandy Edwardian beach, featuring traditional seaside gardens and a model boat pond. In 2023, TripAdvisor reviewers voted the beach the best in Britain and 12th best in Europe. The coastline also includes a lighthouse, lifeboat station and coastwatch station, whilst the Gorleston Pavilion Theatre is located opposite the pier.

A piece of artwork by street artist Banksy can be found in a seaside shelter near the beach, depicting an arcade claw machine above a bench, as part of a series named A Great British Spraycation.

Other local facilities include James Paget University Hospital, a library and a golf club.

== Notable people ==
- William Adams (1864–1913) highly decorated lifesaver and swimming instructor.
- Georgie Aldous (born 1998) British social activist, model and influencer
- Jessica-Jane Applegate (born 1996) Paralympic swimmer and gold medalist
- Rita Farmer (1914–2025), supercentenarian, oldest person in the county of Norfolk at the time of death.
- Rowland Fisher (1885–1969) painter, mainly known for his seascapes
- William Fleming (1865–1954) highly decorated lifeboatman
- John Fuller, Baron Fuller (born 1968), British life peer created Baron Fuller, of Gorleston-on-Sea in the County of Norfolk by Letters Patent on 8 March 2024 and took his seat in the House of Lords on 12 March 2024.
- Stanley Charles Fuller (1907–1988) Norfolk's first Olympic Athlete, who competed at the 1932 Olympic Games in Los Angeles.
- Paul Derek Gibbs (born 1972) former footballer with approx. 200 club caps
- Peter Green (1946–2020) English blues rock guitarist and the founder of Fleetwood Mac. Green lived in Gorleston for a brief period in the early 1990s.
- Ralph Jones (1900–1944) Gorleston-born Australian soldier who was posthumously awarded the George Cross for gallantry
- Maurice Kaufmann (1927–1997) actor on stage, film and TV, married to Honor Blackman 1961–1975
- Myleene Klass (born 1978) TV presenter, musician, former member of pop group Hear'Say
- Gregg Lowe (born 1986) actor
- George William Manby (1765–1854) inventor of a life-saving mortar for shipwrecks, blue plaque on his house at 86 High Road.
- Campbell Archibald Mellon (1876–1955) painter and founder member of the Great Yarmouth and Gorleston Society of Artists
- Sammy Morgan (born 1946) former professional footballer, making over 260 appearances
- Kate Norgate (1853–1935) eminent historian and author. Norgate lived in Gorleston from 1921 until her death
- Kip Sabian (born 1992) professional wrestler, currently signed by American promotion, All Elite Wrestling
- Peter Simpson (born 1945) former professional footballer with 370 appearances for Arsenal F.C.
- Hannah Spearritt (born 1981) actress and former member of pop group S Club 7
- Henry Edward Sutton (born 1963) Senior Lecturer in Creative Writing at the University of East Anglia and award-winning crime novelist

== See also ==
- Gorleston F.C., a non-League football club who ground-share with Great Yarmouth Town F.C. at Wellesley.

== Sources ==
- Norfolk Record Office Information Leaflet 33: Great Yarmouth, (Norwich: Norfolk Record Office, 2006)
