= Wiener Stadthalle =

Multi-purpose indoor arena and convention center

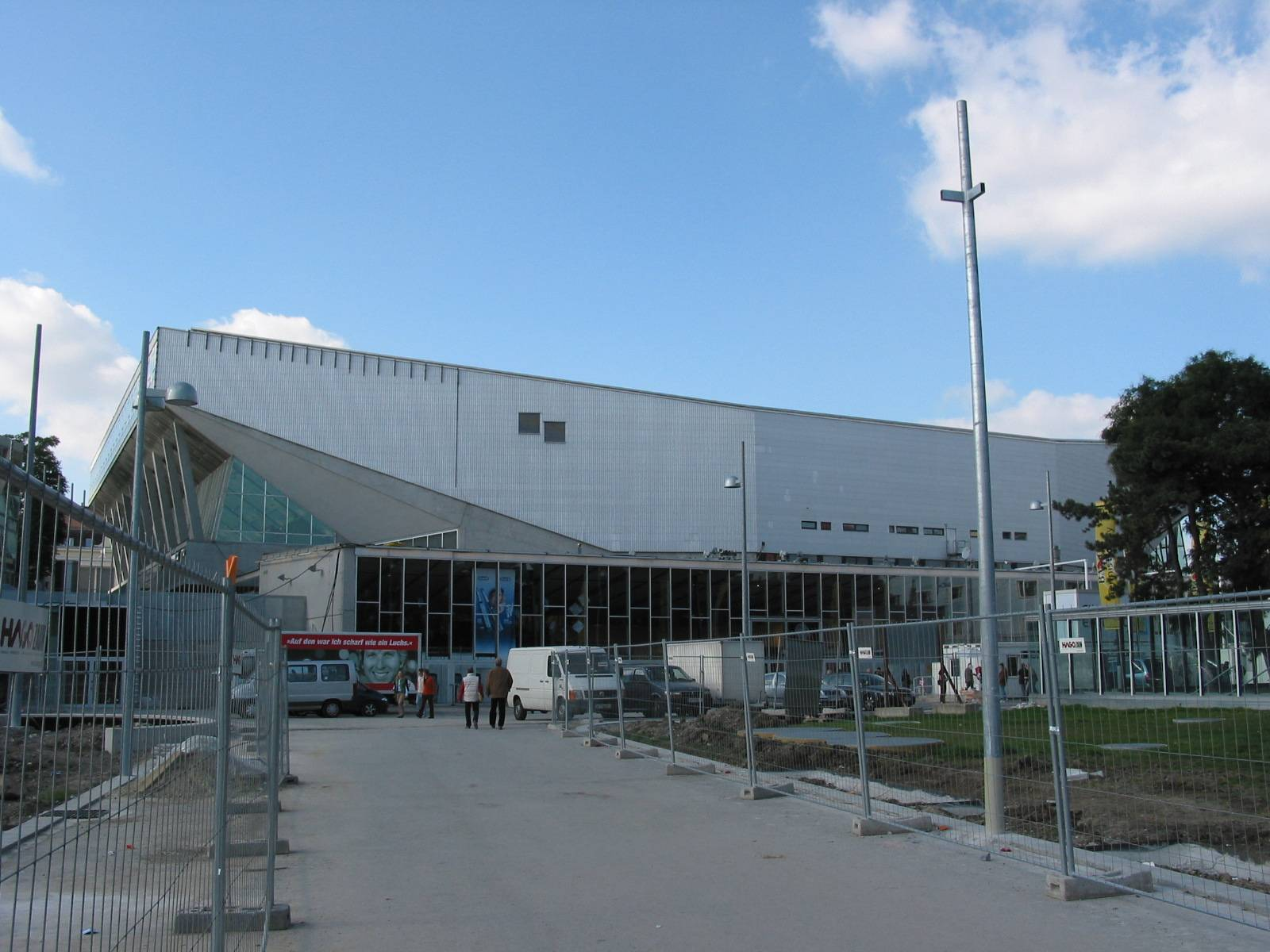
- Exterior view of the main hall in 2005
- Interactive map of Wiener Stadthalle
- Location: Roland Rainer Platz 1, 1150 Rudolfsheim-Fünfhaus, Vienna, Austria
- Coordinates: 48°12′07″N 16°19′58″E
- Owner: City of Vienna
- Capacity: 16,083 with standing (Hall D); 1,482 (Hall E); 2,036 (Hall F)
- Surface: Versatile
- Public transit: at Burggasse-Stadthalle at Westbahnhof at Wien Westbahnhof

Construction
- Built: 1953–1958
- Opened: 19 October 1957 (Halls A and B); 1 March 1958 (Hall C); 21 June 1958 (Hall D); 1994 (Hall E); 2006 (Hall F)
- Expanded: 1958, 1974, 1994, 2006
- Architects: Roland Rainer; Dietrich/Untertrifaller (Hall F)

Website
- www.stadthalle.com

Wiener Stadthalle (German: [ˈviːnɐ ˈʃtathalə]; English: Viennese City Hall) is a multi-purpose indoor arena and convention center located in the 15th district of Vienna, Austria. The Austrian architect Roland Rainer designed the original halls, which were constructed between 1953 and 1958 and later expanded in 1974, 1994 and 2006. The main hall, a flexible multi-purpose venue, is Austria's largest indoor arena and can hold up to approximately 16,083 people.

Since 2006, the complex has housed six main venues (each of which can be used separately or combined) consisting of two gymnasiums, an indoor ice rink, large-capacity indoor arena, a small multi-purpose hall, an auditorium with a show stage and an adjacent swimming pool. It serves as a venue for a variety of events, including concerts, exhibitions, trade fairs, conferences, lectures, theatre, televisiom and sports.

The Wiener Stadthalle is a subsidiary of Wien Holding and stages more than 350 events each year that attract around a million visitors. Halls A, B and C, as well as the Stadthallenbad, are managed by the Viennese sports venues corporation GmbH.

== History of events ==
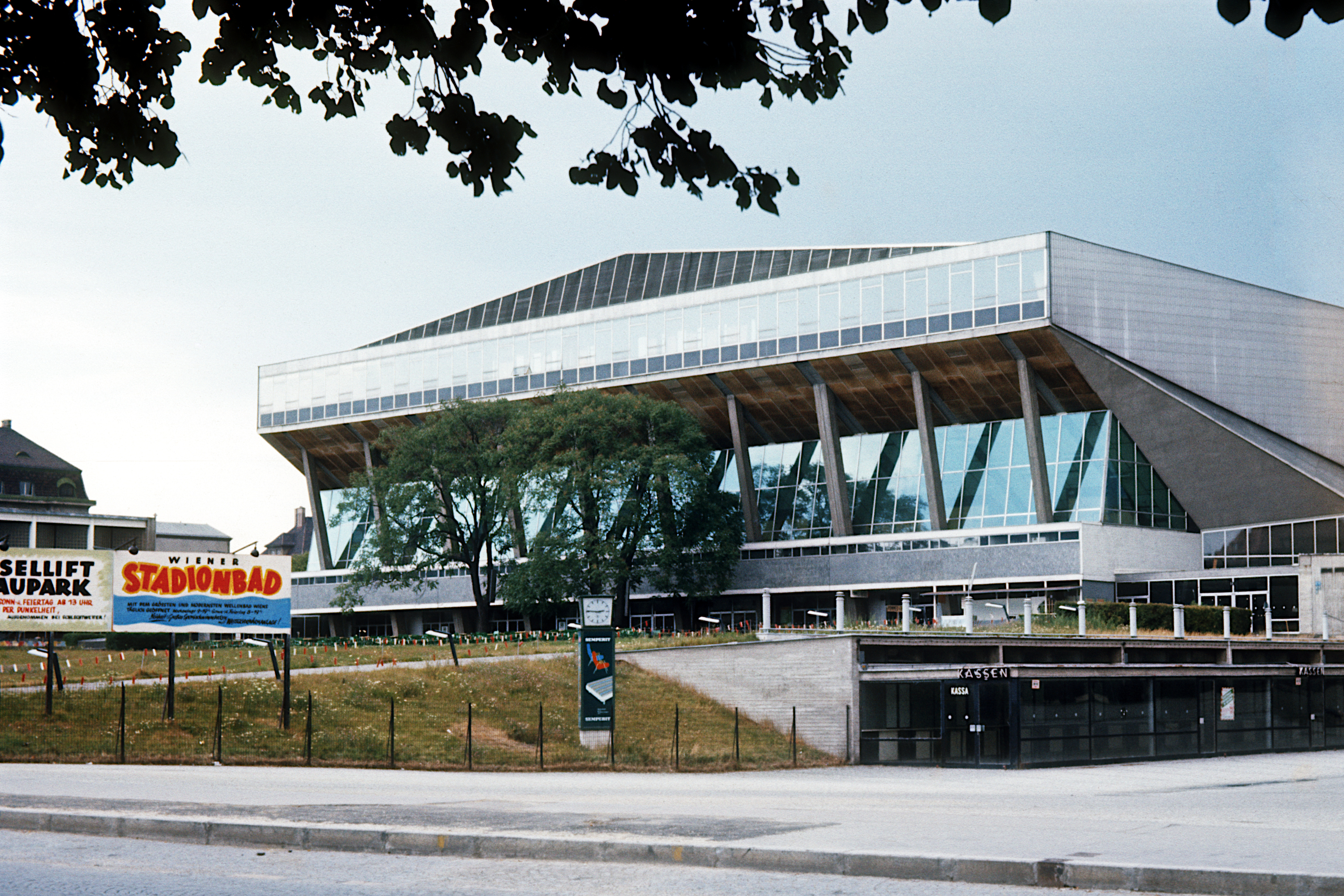
Stadthalle (Hall D) in around 1972

The arena has been site of the annual Erste Bank Open tennis tournament since 1974 and has hosted the ice shows Vienna Ice Revue and Holiday on Ice, the touring horse show Apassionata annually and the circus show Artisten-Tiere-Attraktionen from 1959 to 1995.

The Stadthalle has also hosted a number of sporting events including the 1970 European Athletics Indoor Championships, the 2004 European Short Course Swimming Championships, the 2010 and 2020 European Men's Handball Championship, the 2011 Men's European Volleyball Championship, the Austrian International open badminton tournament and the Ice Hockey World Championships in 1967, 1977, 1987, 1996 and 2005.

The Austrian broadcaster ORF announced on August 6, 2014 that Stadthalle would be the host venue for the Eurovision Song Contest 2015, following the victory of Conchita Wurst in the 2014 Final in Copenhagen, Denmark. The arena hosted the 60th contest in the main hall; the semi-finals were held on May 19 and 21 and the grand final was held on the night of May 23, 2015, where Måns Zelmerlöw won the contest for Sweden. On August 20, 2025 it was announced that the venue would host the Eurovision Song Contest again in 2026 following the victory of JJ in 2025 with the song "Wasted Love".

== Building ==
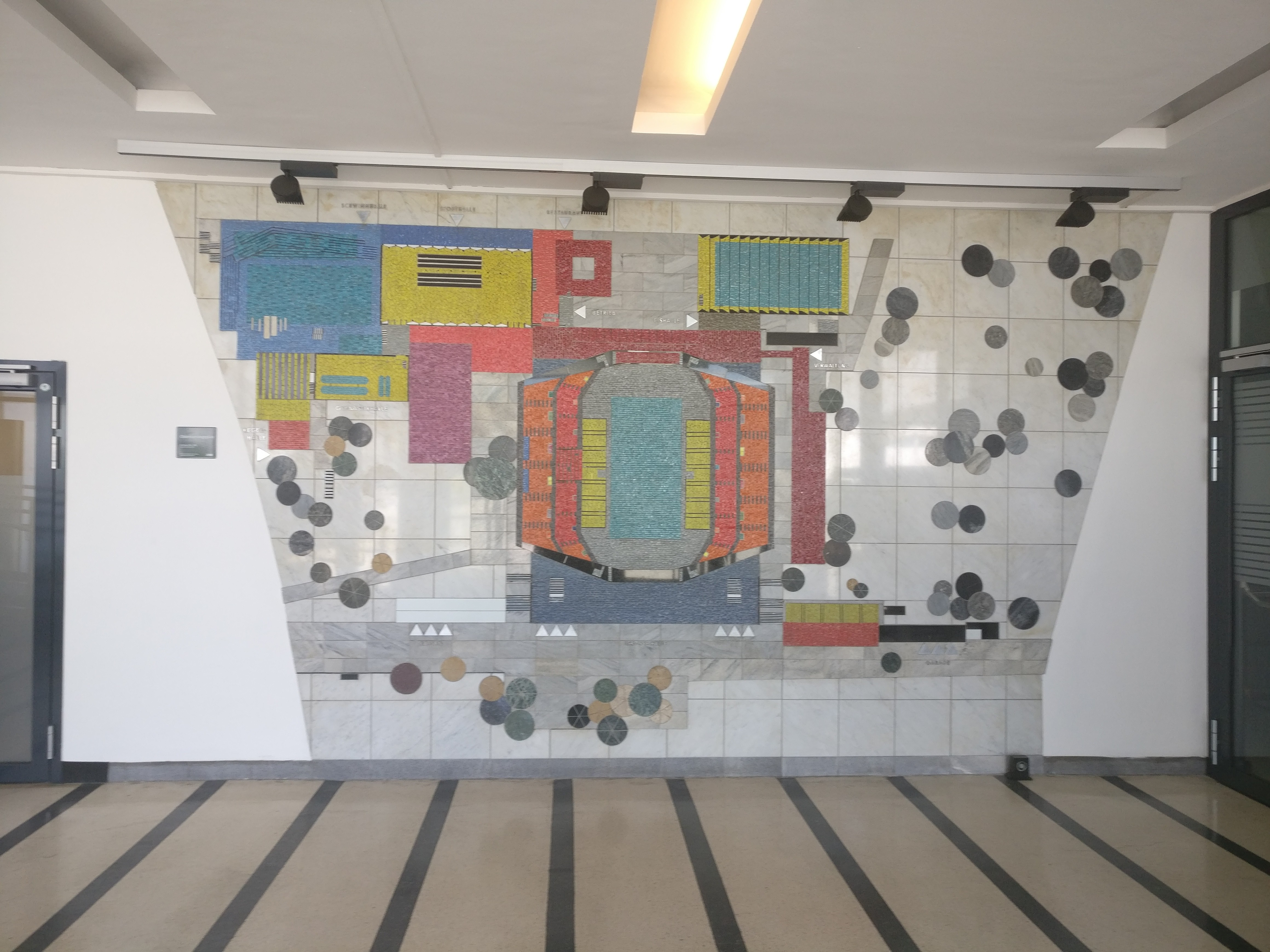
Wall-bound mosaic "Orientation Plan" by Carl Unger on public display (May 2017)

The complex comprises six interconnecting halls: A and B (gymnasiums built in 1957, which can also be used for conferences or lectures), C (indoor ice rink), D (indoor arena, mostly for concerts or sport), E (small multi-purpose hall for smaller events) and F (arena hall for more intimate concerts). In addition to the halls, there is a residential and workshop building with a garage, an administration building with a restaurant, as well as the machine rooms and transformer station.

In December 2022, a photovoltaic system was installed on the roof of Hall D for the production of green electricity. This was later expanded to Hall F and completed in September 2024.

=== Halls A and B ===
Halls A and B were completed in 1957 as a gymnasium and sports hall. Hall A is 18 by 36 metres (59 ft × 118 ft) and 7.6 metres (25 ft) high, whilst Hall B is 30 by 60 metres (98 ft × 197 ft) and 11.8 metres (39 ft) high. Both halls can also be used for conferences or lectures. Hall B has long-sided stands with a capacity of 390 people, and the stands can be extended at the ends by 650 people. The basement of Hall A houses training rooms and the lower level of Hall B contains bowling lanes and dressing rooms.

=== Hall C ===
Hall C, completed in 1958, houses an ice rink 30 by 60 by 7.3 metres (98 ft × 197 ft × 24 ft) and is operated by Die EisStadthalle. In addition to training opportunities for ice hockey and figure skating, it also offers public facilities for kindergarten and exhibition skating.

=== Hall D ===
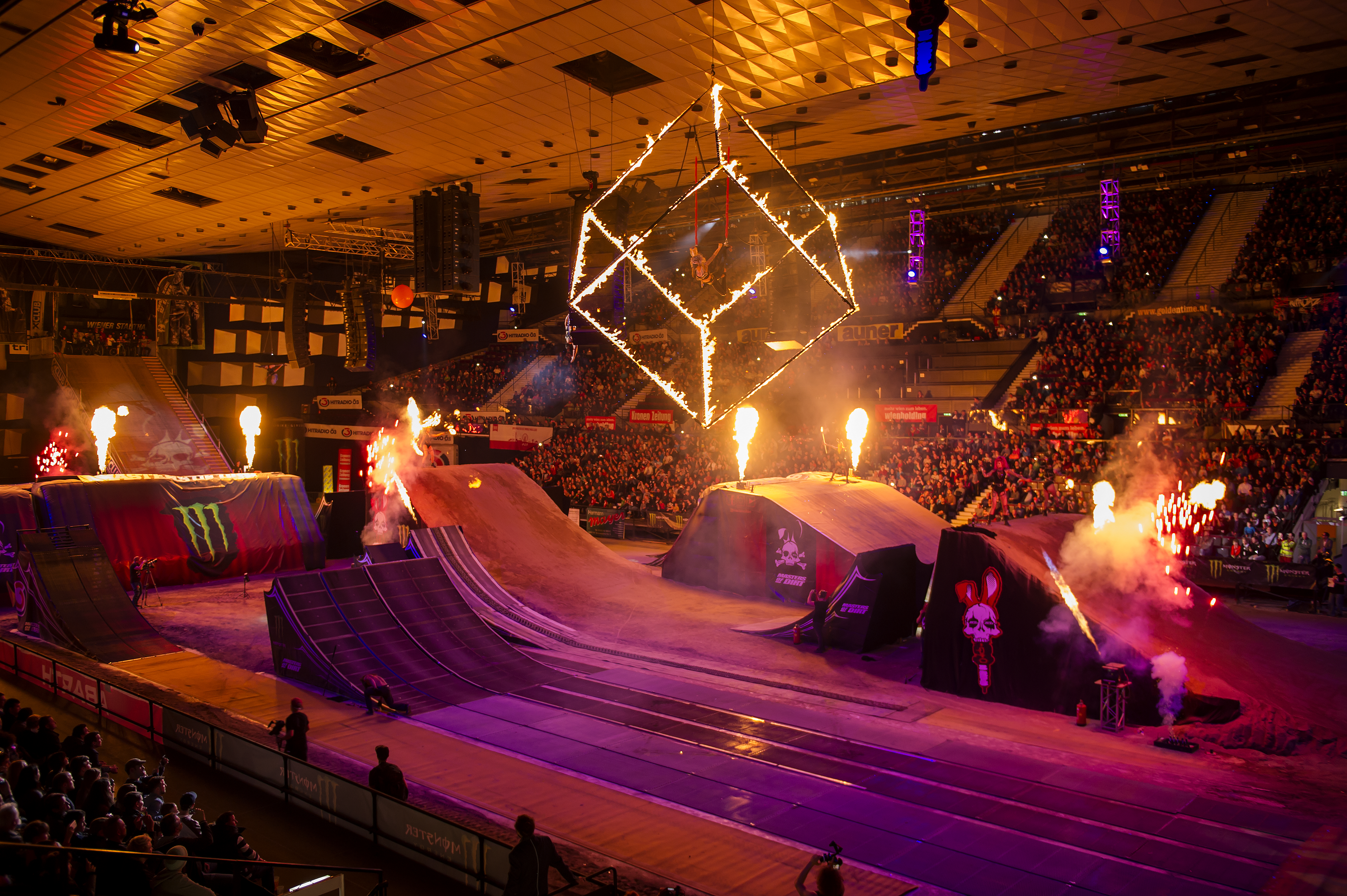
Masters of Dirt Show Vienna 2016

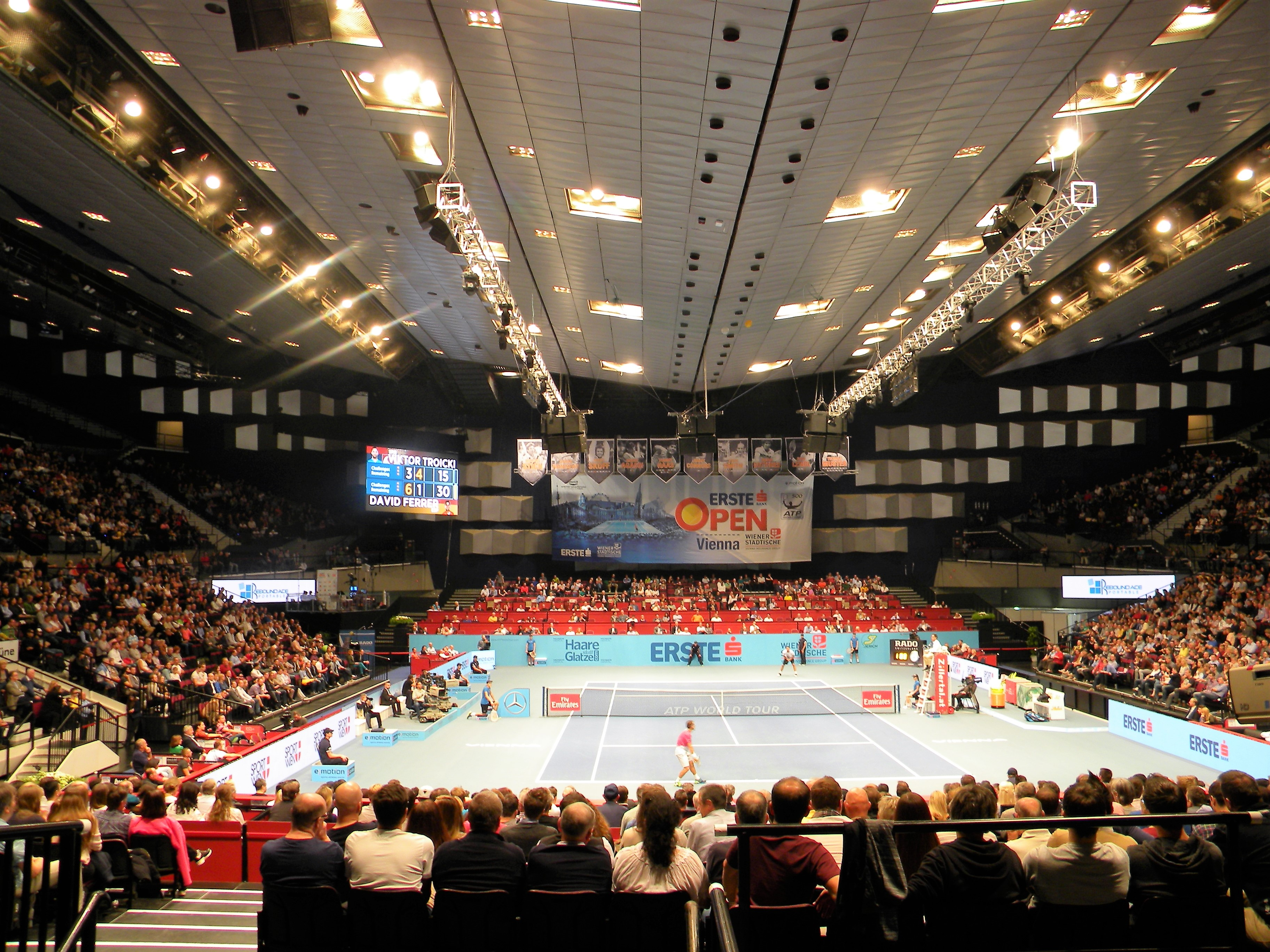
2016 Erste Bank Open

Completed in 1958, the large multi-purpose main hall is Austria's largest indoor arena. The structure is 98 by 110 metres (322 ft × 361 ft) and has a ridge height of 26.6 metres (87 ft) with a usable floor area measuring 98 by 55.2 by 15.4 metres (322 ft × 181 ft × 51 ft).

The hall is a flexible space offering a variety of standard and bespoke layouts with up to 10,741 seats (fixed and removable). With a combination of floor standing and reduced seating, the overall capacity can be increased up to 16,083. The venue has special curtain systems and ground-level stands on the north and south sides of the hall which can be fully closed to divide the hall into several parts. Above this, there are two tiers, and if necessary, a stand can be constructed in the stalls on one side. The stage can be up to 600 square metres (6,500 sq ft) and is supported with two VIP rooms, dressing rooms and offices backstage.

For the Eurovision Song Contest 2015, it offered seating for a total of 10,500 spectators alongside standing room. On the east side, the hall was narrowly divided, creating commentary boxes parallel to the stage with a green room installed in front of them.

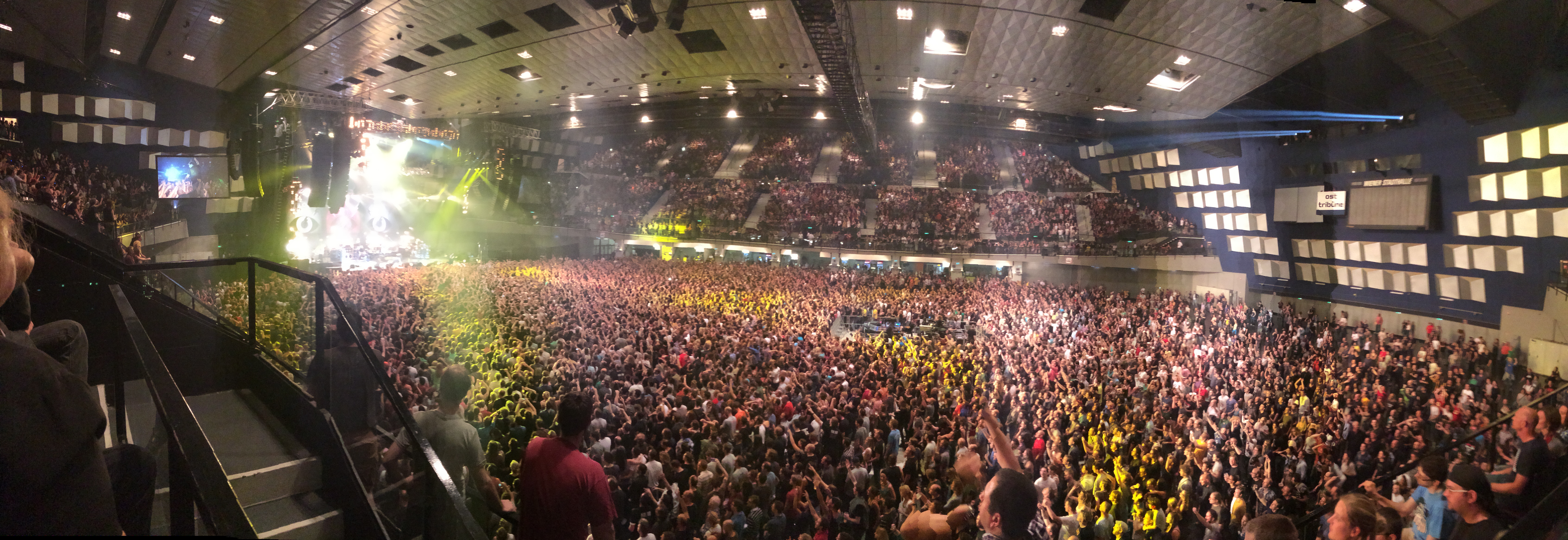
Pearl Jam concert being held in the arena's main hall in June 2014

=== Hall E ===
The small multi-purpose hall was completed in 1994 and holds up to 1,482 people. It is 50 by 25 by 4.5 metres (164 ft × 82 ft × 15 ft) and is used mainly for exhibitions, conventions and social receptions.

=== Hall F ===
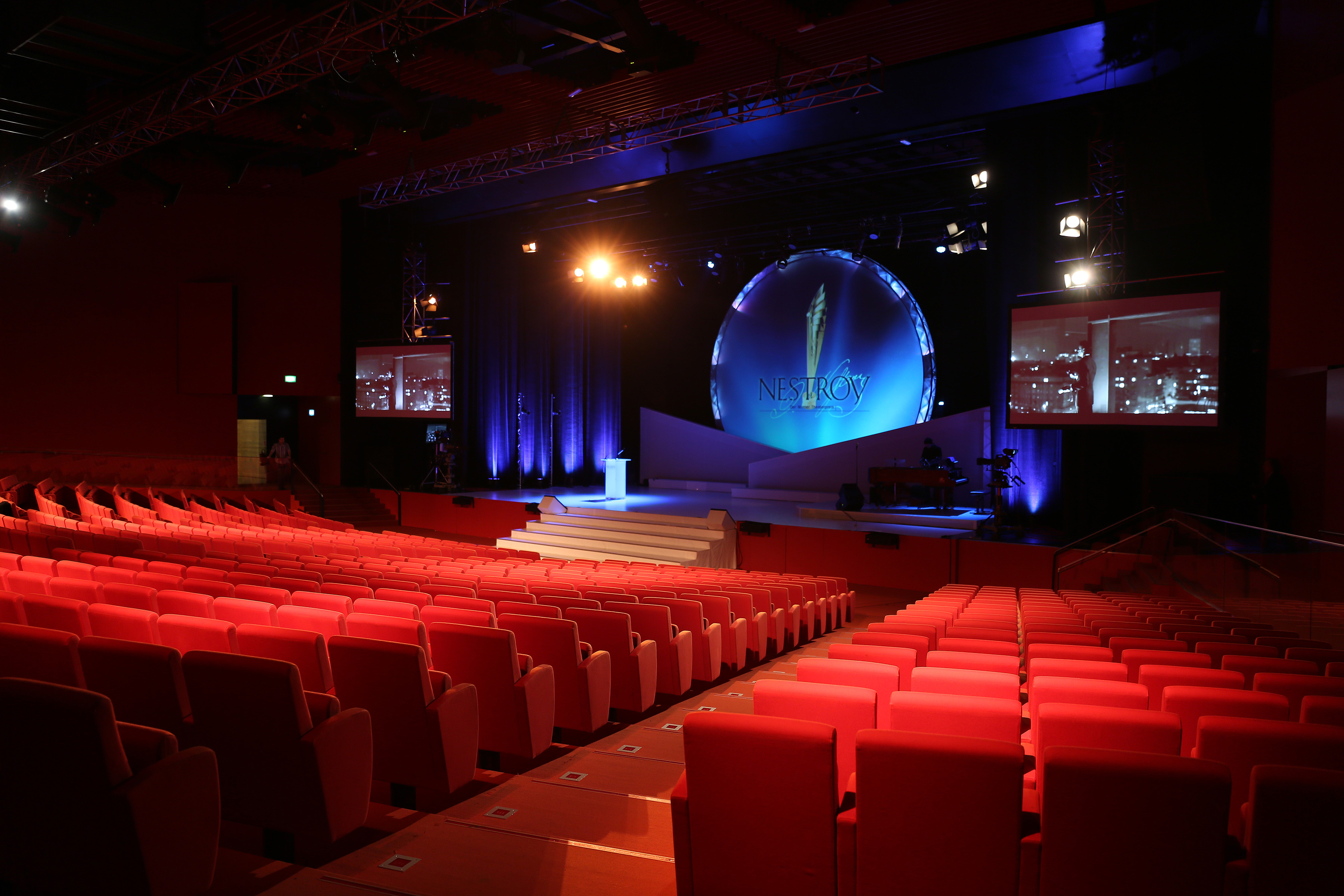
Nestroy Theatre Prize 2013

Conceived as an arena hall, Hall F was completed in 2006 and holds up to 2,036 visitors in raked theatre seating. It is 68.2 by 73.4 by 12.5 metres (224 ft × 241 ft × 41 ft). The hall has a built-in catwalk and an audio and video system. To accommodate visitors, there is a 1,300 square metres (14,000 sq ft) foyer, a connected restaurant with two additional foyers of 400 square metres (4,300 sq ft) and a banquet hall of 300 square metres (3,200 sq ft).

=== Stadthallenbad ===
In 1974, the additional Stadthallenbad and three public swimming pools, were constructed. For the 2004 European Short Course Swimming Championships, the center added a temporary pool of 1,025 square metres (11,030 sq ft) in the main hall.

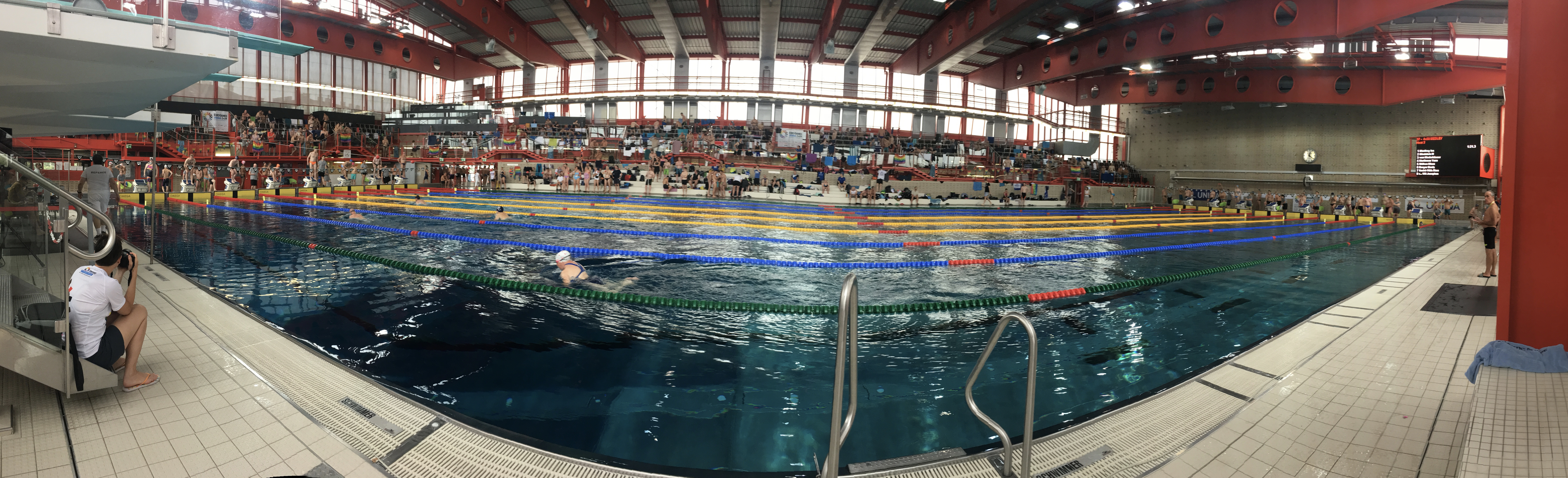
EuroGames 2024 swimming competition

== Entertainment ==
Entertainment events at Wiener Stadthalle
Date	Artists	Events	Opening Act
1965
September 17	The Rolling Stones	1965 European Tour	
1966
October 31	The Beach Boys		
1967
April 2	The Rolling Stones	1967 European Tour	
1968
November 10	Bee Gees	1967 – 1968 Concert Tour	
1970
September 27	The Rolling Stones	1970 European Tour	
1971
September 4	Deep Purple	In Rock World Tour	
1972
September 2	The Who	1972 Tour	
1973
February 19	Status Quo	Piledriver Tour	
March 14	Deep Purple	Who Do We Think We Are	
March 16	Led Zeppelin	Led Zeppelin European Tour 1973	
September 1	The Rolling Stones	1973 European Tour	Kracker; Billy Preston
1974
June 17	Uriah Heep	Wonderworld Tour	
1975
September 7	Alice Cooper	Welcome to My Nightmare Tour	
1976
June 23	The Rolling Stones	Tour of Europe '76	
1977
June 19	Neil Diamond		
June 20	Neil Diamond		
1978
February 20	Status Quo	Rockin'all Over The World Tour	
May 2	Queen	News of the World Tour	
May 22	David Bowie	Isolar II – The 1978 World Tour	
1979
October 29	ABBA	ABBA: The Tour	
November 1	Boney M.		
1980
March 30	The Who	1980 Tour	
June 26	Led Zeppelin	Tour Over Europe 1980	
November 7	Rod Stewart	Foolish Behaviour Tour	
1981
July 21	Bob Dylan	1981 World Tour	
November 6	Santana	Zebop Tour	
1982
May 12	Queen	Hot Space Tour	
May 13	Queen	Hot Space Tour	
1983
May 12	Santana	Shangó Tour	
May 18	Dire Straits	Love over Gold Tour	
May 23	Elton John	European Express Tour	
May 24	Nena	Nena-Tournee	
November 8	Kiss	Lick It Up World Tour	Helix
1984
March 16	Nena	Fragezeichen-Tournee	
March 17	Nena	Fragezeichen-Tournee	
June 14	Bob Dylan	1984 European Tour	
June 26	Yes	9012Live Tour	
September 29	Queen	The Works Tour	Airrace
September 30	Queen	The Works Tour	Airrace
1985
April 3	Tina Turner	Private Dancer Tour	
May 15	Dire Straits	Brothers in Arms Tour	
June 26	Deep Purple	Perfect Strangers World Tour, aka Reunion Tour	
June 27	Deep Purple	Perfect Strangers World Tour, aka Reunion Tour	
October 3	Nena	Feuer und Flamme Tour 1985	
October 26	Shirley Bassey		
October 31	Falco		
November 1	Falco		
November 7	Dire Straits	Brothers in Arms Tour	
1986
April 19	Elton John	Ice on Fire Tour	
April 20	Elton John	Ice on Fire Tour	
July 21	Queen	The Magic Tour	Craaft
July 22	Queen	The Magic Tour	Craaft
September 6	Rod Stewart	Every Beat Of My Heart Tour	
October 12	Falco		
November 14	Falco		
November 16	Falco		
November 1	A-ha	Hunting High and Low / Scoundrel Days Tour 1986–1987	
1987
January 31	Toto	Fahrenheit Tour	
March 16	Santana	Freedom Tour	
May 9	Tina Turner	Break Every Rule Tour	
May 10	Tina Turner	Break Every Rule Tour	
May 11	Tina Turner	Break Every Rule Tour	
May 12	Duran Duran	1987 The Strange Behaviour Tour	
May 29	Prince	Sign o' the Times Tour	
May 30	Prince	Sign o' the Times Tour	
June 17	Uriah Heep	Rockarama Over Europe Tour	
August 27	Deep Purple	The House of Blue Light World Tour	
1988
March 13	Depeche Mode	Music for the Masses Tour	
May 12	George Michael	Faith World Tour	
June 16	Whitney Houston	Moment of Truth World Tour	
November 13	Status Quo	Ain't Complaining Tour	
November 18	Gianna Nannini	Malafemmina European Tour	
1989
February 2	Europe	Out of this World Tour	
May 1	Elton John	Reg Strikes Back Tour	
May 2	Elton John	Reg Strikes Back Tour	
May 6	Shirley Bassey		
May 9	Santana	Viva Santana Tour	
1991
May 17	Rod Stewart	Vagabond Tour	
May 25	The Cure	The Prayer Tour	
October 25	Roxette	Join the Joyride! World Tour	
November 30	New Kids on the Block	The Magic Summer Tour	
1992
November 20	Metallica	Wherever We May Roam Tour	
1993
April 7	Iron Maiden	Real Live Tour	
June 23	Depeche Mode	Devotional Tour	
June 26	Metallica	Nowhere Else to Roam	
October 27	Deep Purple	Deep Purple 25 Years Anniversary World Tour, aka The Battle Rages on	
November 14	Aerosmith	Get a Grip Tour	
1994
November 26	Roxette	Crash! Boom! Bang! World Tour	
December 16	Iron Maiden	The X Factour	
1995
April 15	Take That	Pops Tour	
1996
February 4	David Bowie	Outside Tour	
March 12	Lenny Kravitz	Circus Tour	
April 3	Deep Purple	Purpendicular World Tour	
May 19	AC/DC	Ballbreaker World Tour	
July 17	ZZ Top	Continental Safari Tour	
November 16	The Cure	The Swing Tour	
December 19	Backstreet Boys	Backstreet Boys: Live in Concert Tour	
1997
March 22	Wetten, dass..?		
May 1	The Who	1996 – 1997 Tour	
May 22	Jean-Michel Jarre	Electronica Tour	
May 23	Aerosmith	Nine Lives Tour	
1998
May 3	Janet Jackson	Velvet Rope Tour	Another Level
May 4	Jon Bon Jovi	Destination Anywhere Tour	
May 15	Spice Girls	Spiceworld Tour	
May 16	Spice Girls	Spiceworld Tour	
September 16	Depeche Mode	The Singles Tour	
1999
March 17	Kiss	Psycho Circus World Tour	Buckcherry
April 24	Bruce Springsteen	Reunion Tour	
April 30	Bob Dylan	Never Ending Tour 1999	
June 17	Lenny Kravitz	The Freedom Tour	
June 20	Alanis Morissette	Junkie Tour	
October 22	Whitney Houston	My Love Is Your Love World Tour	Amanda Marshall
October 23	Whitney Houston	My Love Is Your Love World Tour	Amanda Marshall
October 30	Bryan Adams	The Best of Me Tour	
November 30	Cher	Believe Tour	Belinda Carlisle
2000
May 26	Santana	Supernatural Tour	
June 2	Oasis	Standing on the Shoulder of Giants Tour	Johnny Marr and the Healers
October 27	Deep Purple	Concerto World Tour	
November 14	The Corrs	In Blue Tour	Picturehouse
November 21	AC/DC	Stiff Upper Lip World Tour	Slash's Snakepit
November 22	AC/DC	Stiff Upper Lip World Tour	Slash's Snakepit
November 25	Elton John	Medusa Tour	
2001
March 13	Robbie Williams	The Sermon on the Mount Tour	
March 18	Googoosh	Comeback Tour	
May 19	Lionel Richie		
May 22	Rammstein	Mutter Tour	
June 1	Nick Cave	No More Shall We Part Tour	
July 26	U2	Elevation Tour	Kelis
July 27	U2	Elevation Tour	Kelis
September 11	Depeche Mode	Exciter Tour	
November 2	Roxette	Room Service Tour	
2002
December 7	Wetten, dass..?		
2003
March 30	Shakira	Tour of the Mongoose	
March 31	Shakira	Tour of the Mongoose	
April 17	Bryan Adams	Here I Am Tour	
May 31	Nena	20 Jahre – Nena feat. Nena Tour 2003/2004	
June 8	Iron Maiden	Give Me Ed... 'Til I'm Dead Tour	
September 10	Santana	Shaman Tour	
October 15	Christina Aguilera	The Stripped Tour	
October 19	Mariah Carey	Charmbracelet World Tour	
October 27	Bob Dylan	Never Ending Tour 2003	
October 29	David Bowie	A Reality Tour	The Dandy Warhols
October 30	Deep Purple	Bananas World Tour	
November 28	The Dome (television program)		
December 12	Marilyn Manson	Grotesk Burlesk Tour	
2004
February 21	Regine Velasquez	Regine Velasquez European Tour '04	
March 22	Shania Twain	Up! Tour	Bjorn Again
May 22	Britney Spears	Onyx Hotel Tour	
June 1	Cher	Living Proof: The Farewell Tour	
October 30	Anastacia	Live at Last Tour	
2005
February 15	Anastacia	Live at Last Tour	
February 16	Rammstein	Ahoi Tour	
March 30	Kylie Minogue	Showgirl: The Greatest Hits Tour	Melody Club
April 13	Queen + Paul Rodgers	2005 Tour	
June 7	Duran Duran	The Astronaut Tour	
June 15	Rod Stewart	From Maggie May to the Great American Songbook Tour	
June 20	Black Sabbath	2005 European Tour	
November 11	A-ha	Analogue Tour	
December 5	Nena	Willst du mit mir gehn Tour 2005	
December 15	Franz Ferdinand		
2006
February 16	Depeche Mode	Touring the Angel	The Bravery
April 14	Placebo	Meds Tour	
May 28	Santana	2006 Tour	
September 25	Pearl Jam	2006 World Tour	
November 19	Tool	10,000 Days Tour	
November 20	Bryan Adams	Room Service Tour	
December 6	Muse	Black Holes and Revelations Tour	Noisettes
December 16	Christina Aguilera	Back To Basics Tour	
2007
March 6	Shakira	Oral Fixation Tour	
April 26	Lionel Richie		
May 8	Beyoncé	The Beyoncé Experience	Lemar
June 4	Justin Timberlake	FutureSex/LoveShow	
July 13	George Michael	25 Live	
October 17	Gwen Stefani	Sweet Escape Tour	CSS
October 26	Take That	Beautiful World Tour	Sophie Ellis-Bextor
October 29	Rod Stewart	Rockin' In The Round Tour	
November 26	Marilyn Manson	Rape of the World Tour	
December 12	Ennio Morricone		
2008
May 12	Kiss	Alive 35 World Tour	Cinder Road
May 14	Kylie Minogue	KylieX2008	
June 10	Bob Dylan	Never Ending Tour 2008	
June 28	Elton John	Rocket Man: Greatest Hits Live	
July 1	Celine Dion	Taking Chances World Tour	Jon Mesek
July 16	Percy Sledge		
September 24	Coldplay	Viva la Vida Tour	High Wire; Albert Hammond Jr.
November 1	Queen + Paul Rodgers	Rock the Cosmos Tour	
November 28	Slipknot	All Hope Is Gone World Tour	
November 29	Sezen Aksu		
December 6	Kid Rock	European Tour	
2009
February 8	Tina Turner	50th Anniversary Tour	
February 9	Tina Turner	50th Anniversary Tour	
February 26	Oasis	Dig Out Your Soul Tour	
March 5	Women's World Award		
April 28	Beyoncé	I Am... World Tour	Linda Teodosiu
May 6	Lionel Richie		
May 14	Metallica	World Magnetic Tour	Machine Head; The Sword
October 12	ZZ Top	Necessity Is a Mother Tour	
November 6	Green Day	21st Century Breakdown World Tour	Prima Donna
November 7	Bryan Adams	The Bare Bones Tour	
November 21	Rammstein	Ahoi Tour	
November 26	The Prodigy		
November 27	Placebo	Battle for the Sun Tour	
December 3	Depeche Mode	Tour of the Universe (tour)	Soulsavers
2010
April 10	Nena	Made in Germany Tour 2010	
May 19	Whitney Houston	Nothing But Love World Tour	Azaryah Davidson
May 20	Kiss	Sonic Boom Over Europe: From the Beginning to the Boom	
June 26	Nina Hagen		
June 27	Rod Stewart	Soulbook Tour	
July 13	Prince	Prince 20Ten	
September 18	Guns N' Roses	Chinese Democracy Tour	
November 5	Sting	Symphonicities Tour	
November 11	Lady Gaga	The Monster Ball Tour	
2011
February 27	Katy Perry	California Dreams Tour	DJ Skeet Skeet
June 29	Judas Priest		
October 10	Roxette	Charm School – The World Tour	
October 12	Bruno Mars	The Doo-Wops & Hooligans Tour	Skylar Grey
November 17	Jean-Michel Jarre	Electronica Tour	
November 18	Lenny Kravitz	Black and White Europe Tour 2011	
November 23	Rammstein	Made in Germany 1995-2011 Tour	
November 25	Sade	Sade Live	
November 26	30 Seconds to Mars	Into the Wild Tour	
2012
May 6	Laura Pausini	Inedito World Tour	
May 12	LMFAO	Sorry for Party Rocking Tour	
June 26	Ozzy Osbourne		
July 4	Pitbull	Planet Pit World Tour	
July 5	Bryan Adams	20th Anniversary Tour	
August 18	Lady Gaga	The Born This Way Ball Tour	The Darkness; Lady Starlight
September 4	George Michael	Symphonica Tour	
September 6	George Michael	Symphonica Tour	
November 22	Lionel Richie	Tuskegee Tour	
December 8	Marilyn Manson	Twins of Evil Tour	
2013
March 23	Wetten, dass..?		
March 30	Justin Bieber	Believe Tour	
April 8	OneRepublic	Native Tour	
June 13	Alicia Keys	Set the World on Fire Tour	
June 18	Elton John	40th Anniversary of the Rocket Man	
July 9	Rihanna	Diamonds World Tour	GTA; Haim
September 17	Selena Gomez	Stars Dance Tour	
October 24	Bruno Mars	The Moonshine Jungle Tour	Mayor Hawthorne
November 19	Muse	The 2nd Law World Tour	Everything Everything
November 21	Placebo	Loud Like Love Tour	
November 28	Stefanie Werger		
2014
January 25	Michael Bublé	To Be Loved Tour	Naturally 7
February 8	Depeche Mode	Delta Machine Tour	
February 16	Ennio Morricone		
April 28	Robbie Williams	The Swing Tour Live	
April 29	Robbie Williams	The Swing Tour Live	
June 4	Justin Timberlake	The 20/20 Experience World Tour	DJ Freestyle Steve
June 7	Prince	Hit and Run Tour (last performance in Europe)	
June 10	Miley Cyrus	Bangerz Tour	
June 25	Pearl Jam	Lightning Bolt Tour	
June 28	Bob Dylan	Never Ending Tour 2014	
July 1	Rod Stewart	Live the Life Tour	
July 15	Backstreet Boys	In a World Like This Tour	
July 27	Deutschland sucht den Superstar		
November 2	Lady Gaga	Artrave: The Artpop Ball	Lady Starlight
November 5	Michael Bublé	To Be Loved Tour	Naturally 7
November 8	Andrea Bocelli		
November 14	Linkin Park	The Hunting Party Tour	Of Mice & Men
November 15	OneRepublic	Native Tour	
November 19	Slash		
December 15	Bryan Adams	30th Anniversary Tour	
December 17	Lenny Kravitz	Strut Europe Tour 2014	
2015
January 28	Anastacia	Resurrection World Tour	Fyre!
February 1	Queen + Adam Lambert	2014 – 2015 Tour	
February 14	Lionel Richie	All the Hits All Night Long Tour	Marion Raven
February 26	Katy Perry	Prismatic World Tour	Charli XCX
~~March 10~~	~~Usher~~	~~The UR Experience Tour~~	
April 1	Sting	On Stage Together Tour	
May 19	Eurovision Song Contest 2015		
May 21	Eurovision Song Contest 2015		
May 23	Eurovision Song Contest 2015		
July 8	Roxette	30th Anniversary Tour	
September 5	Violetta	Violetta Live	
September 6	Violetta	Violetta Live	
November 13	The Prodigy	The Day is My Enemy Tour	
2016
January 26	Slipknot	2016 European Tour	
January 29	Ellie Goulding	Delirium World Tour	Sara Hartman
March 19	Macklemore & Ryan Lewis	This Unruly Mess I’ve Made Tour	
March 25	The Libertines	Anthems for Doomed Youth Tour	
April 10	A-ha	Cast in Steel Tour	
April 12	Florence + The Machine	How Big, How Blue, How Beautiful Tour	
April 19	Mariah Carey	Sweet Sweet Fantasy Tour	
May 9	Muse	Drones World Tour	De Staat
May 12	5 Seconds Of Summer	Sounds Live Feels Live Tour	Jessarae; Don Broco
May 31	Bryan Adams	Get Up Tour	
June 2	The Corrs	White Light Tour	
June 28	Black Sabbath	The End Tour	Rival Sons
July 12	Santana		
August 9	Rihanna	Anti World Tour	Big Sean; R3hab
September 14	The Who	Back to the Who Tour 51!	
November 5	Twenty One Pilots	Emotional Roadshow World Tour	Bry
November 8	Justin Bieber	Purpose World Tour	The Knocks; MiC Lowry
November 9	Rod Stewart	From Gasoline Alley to Another Country: Hits 2016	
November 13	Placebo	20 Years of Placebo Tour	
November 17	Jean-Michel Jarre	Electronica Tour	
November 21	Red Hot Chili Peppers	The Getaway World Tour	Deerhoof
November 24	Elton John	Wonderful Crazy Night Tour	
December 14	Enrique Iglesias	Sex and Love Tour	
2017
February 8	Ennio Morricone		
February 23	Avenged Sevenfold	The Stage World Tour	
March 1	Grigory Leps		
May 4	Shawn Mendes	Illuminate World Tour	James TW
May 17	Deep Purple	The Long Goodbye Tour	Monster Truck
May 21	Kiss	The KISSWORLD 2017 Tour	
June 3	Bruno Mars	24K Magic World Tour	Anderson .Paak
June 12	The Beach Boys		
July 20	Brian Wilson		
September 14	Sting	57th & 9th Tour	
September 19	Neil Diamond		
November 1	Nick Cave	Skeleton Tree-Tour	
November 2	Gorillaz	Humanz Tour	Little Simz
November 5	Queens of the Stone Age		
November 8	Queen + Adam Lambert	2017 Tour	
November 27	Alice Cooper	A Paranormal Evening with Alice Cooper Live Tour	
December 9	Charles Aznavour	«En toute intimité» World Tour	
December 23	Sarah Brightman	Royal Christmas Gala	
2018
February 2	A-ha	An acoustic evening with a-ha	
February 4	Depeche Mode	Global Spirit Tour	EMA
March 24	Andrea Bocelli	Cinema World Tour	
March 31	Metallica	WorldWired Tour	Kvelertak
April 5	Soy Luna	Soy Luna Live	
April 6	Soy Luna	Soy Luna Live	
April 16	Bob Dylan	Never Ending Tour 2018	
April 17	30 Seconds to Mars	The Monolith Tour	
May 3	Anastacia	Evolution: The Tour 2018	
May 18	Roger Waters	Us + Them Tour	
June 4	Katy Perry	Witness: The Tour	Tove Styrke
June 9	Lenny Kravitz	Raise Vibration Tour	
June 13	John Cleese	Last time to see me before I die	
June 19	Jovanotti	Live 2018	
June 20	Ringo Starr		
July 28	Judas Priest		
August 18	Justin Timberlake	Man of the Woods Tour	Bazzi
October 18	Per Gessle		
December 15	Googoosh		
2019
April 3	Shawn Mendes	Shawn Mendes The Tour	Alessia Cara
May 1	Elton John	Farewell Yellow Brick Road Tour	
May 2	Elton John	Farewell Yellow Brick Road Tour	
May 28	Backstreet Boys	DNA World Tour	
June 6	Eric Clapton	World Tour 2019	
June 26	Take That	Greatest Hits Live	Brother Leo
September 3	Ariana Grande	Sweetener World Tour	Ella Mai; Social House
September 16	Alice Cooper	Ol' Black Eyes Is Back: Alice Cooper	
September 21	Michael Bublé	An Evening with Michael Bublé	
October 7	Cher	Here We Go Again Tour	Crimer; KidCutUp
November 16	Tarkan		
2020
February 13	Tenacious D	in Post-Apocalypto the Tour 2020	
February 14	Slipknot	We Are Not Your Kind World Tour	
2022
April 30	Shadmehr Aghili		
May 23	Dua Lipa	Future Nostalgia Tour	Griff
May 27	Scooter	God Save The Rave - Arena Tour 2022	
June 26	Kiss	End of the Road World Tour	
June 28	Alice Cooper		
July 16	Harry Styles	Love On Tour	Wolf Alice
September 28	50 Cent	Green Light Gang World Tour	
November 2	Placebo	Never Let Me Go	
November 4	OneRepublic		
December 3	Bryan Adams	So Happy It Hurts Tour	
December 10	Dino Merlin	Mi (MMXXII)	
2023
February 7	Michael Bublé	Higher Tour	
March 16	Robbie Williams	XXV Tour	
March 17	Robbie Williams	XXV Tour	
April 27	Avril Lavigne	Love Sux Tour	Girlfriends; Phem
July 11	Wu Tang Clan		
July 12	Deep Purple		
July 17	Sting	My Songs Tour	
September 13	Louis Tomlinson		
September 19	Björk	Cornucopia (concert tour)	
September 20	blink-182		
October 6	Googoosh		
2024
March 23	Jason Derulo	Nu King World Tour	
May 18	Thirty Seconds to Mars	Seasons Tour	Jagwar Twin
June 24	The Smashing Pumpkins	The World is a Vampire Tour	Interpol
June 25	The National		Bess Atwell
July 2	Rod Stewart	Rod Stewart The Hits	
September 22	Jonas Brothers	Five Albums. One Night. The World Tour	
2025
March 7	Valery Meladze		
March 9	Lenny Kravitz	Blue Electric Light Tour	
March 28	Anastacia	Not That Kind: 25th Anniversary Tour 2025	
April 13	Twenty One Pilots	The Clancy World Tour	
June 6	Billie Eilish	Hit Me Hard and Soft: The Tour	
June 8	Tate McRae	Miss Possessive Tour	
June 11	Lara Fabian	Je T'Aime World Tour	
June 17	Green Day	The Saviors Tour	
June 18	Green Day	The Saviors Tour	
June 30	Santana	Oneness Tour	
July 16	Lionel Richie	Say Hello To The Hits Tour	
November 11	OneRepublic	Escape to Europe Tour	
December 9	Rod Stewart	Rod Stewart The Hits	
December 18	Bryan Adams	The Roll with the Punches Tour	
2026
March 3	Jason Derulo	The Last Dance World Tour	
May 12	Eurovision Song Contest 2026		
May 14	Eurovision Song Contest 2026		
May 16	Eurovision Song Contest 2026		
August 30	Diljit Dosanjh		

== Gallery ==
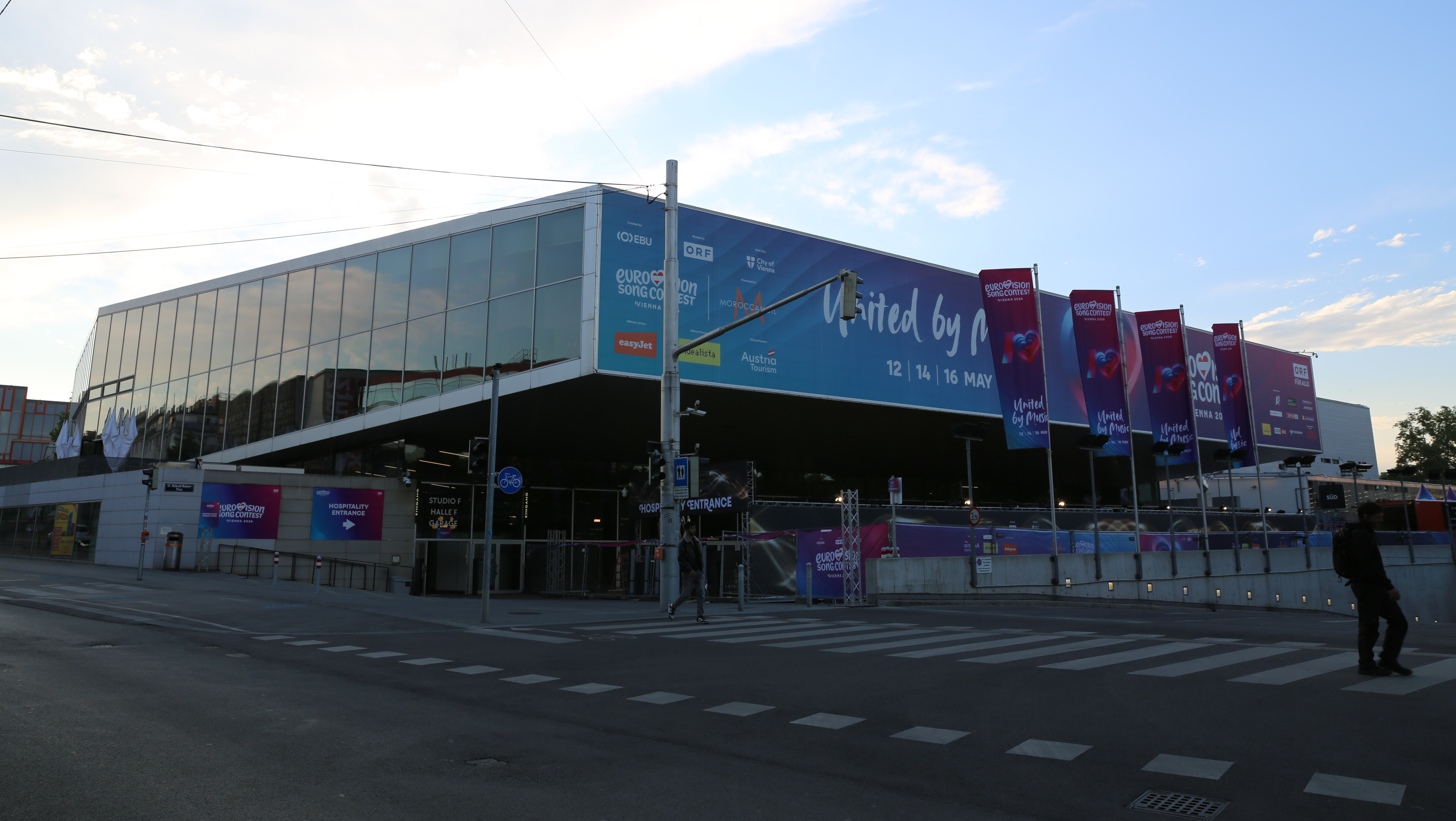
Hall F, behind the city pool, during Eurovision Song Contest 2026

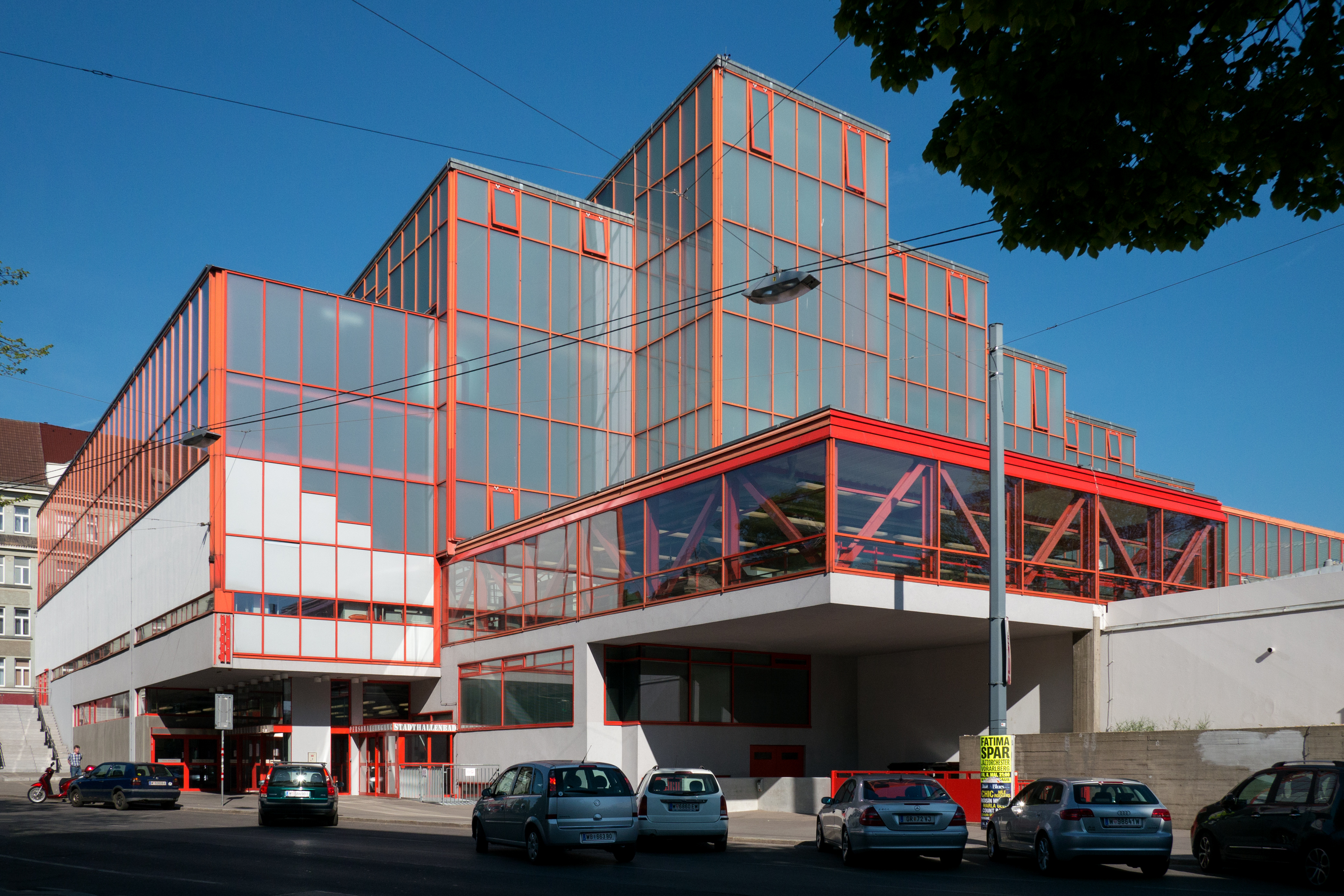
Stadthallenbad (2015)

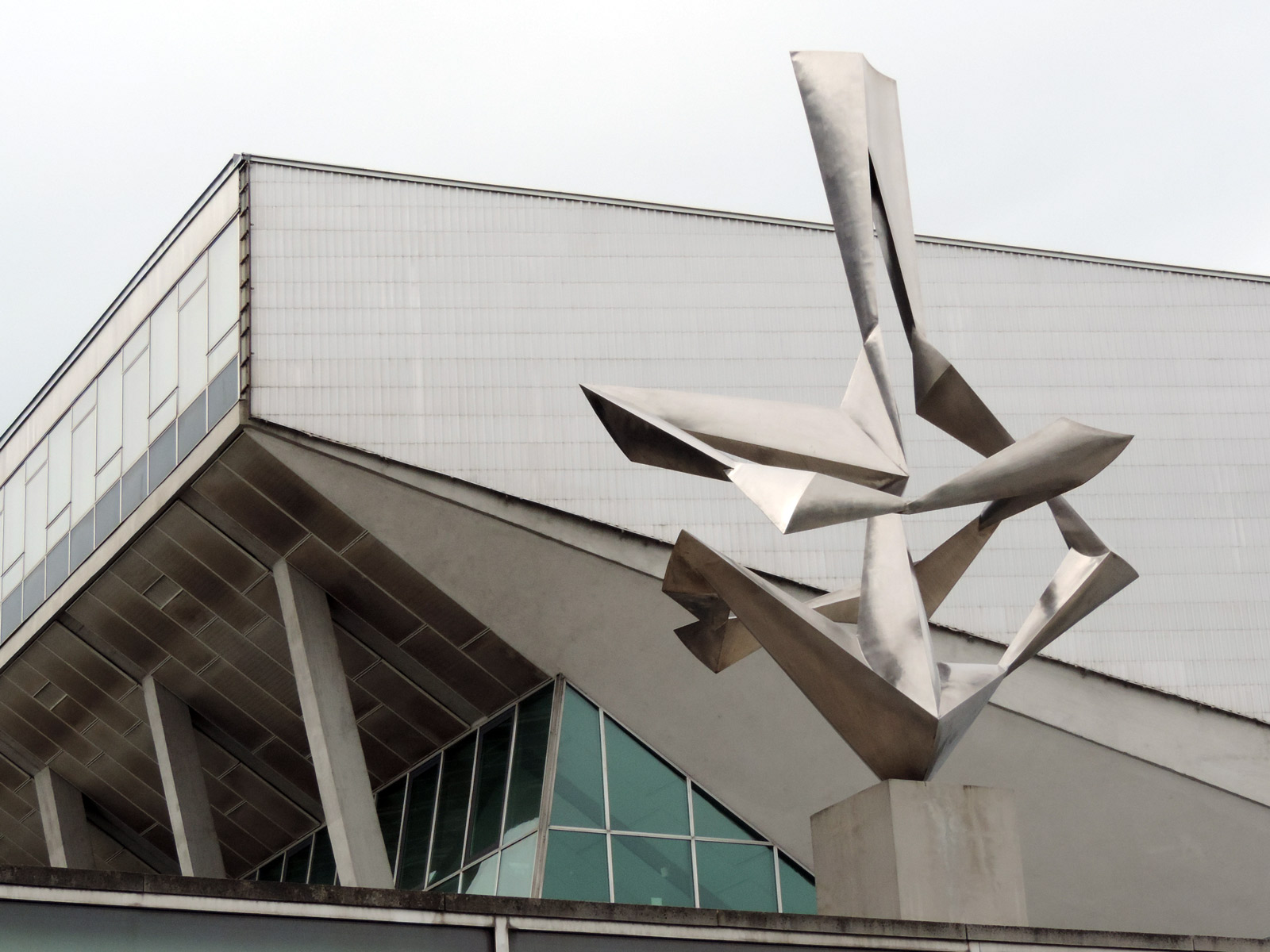
Steel sculpture “The Movement” by Wander Bertoni (2024)

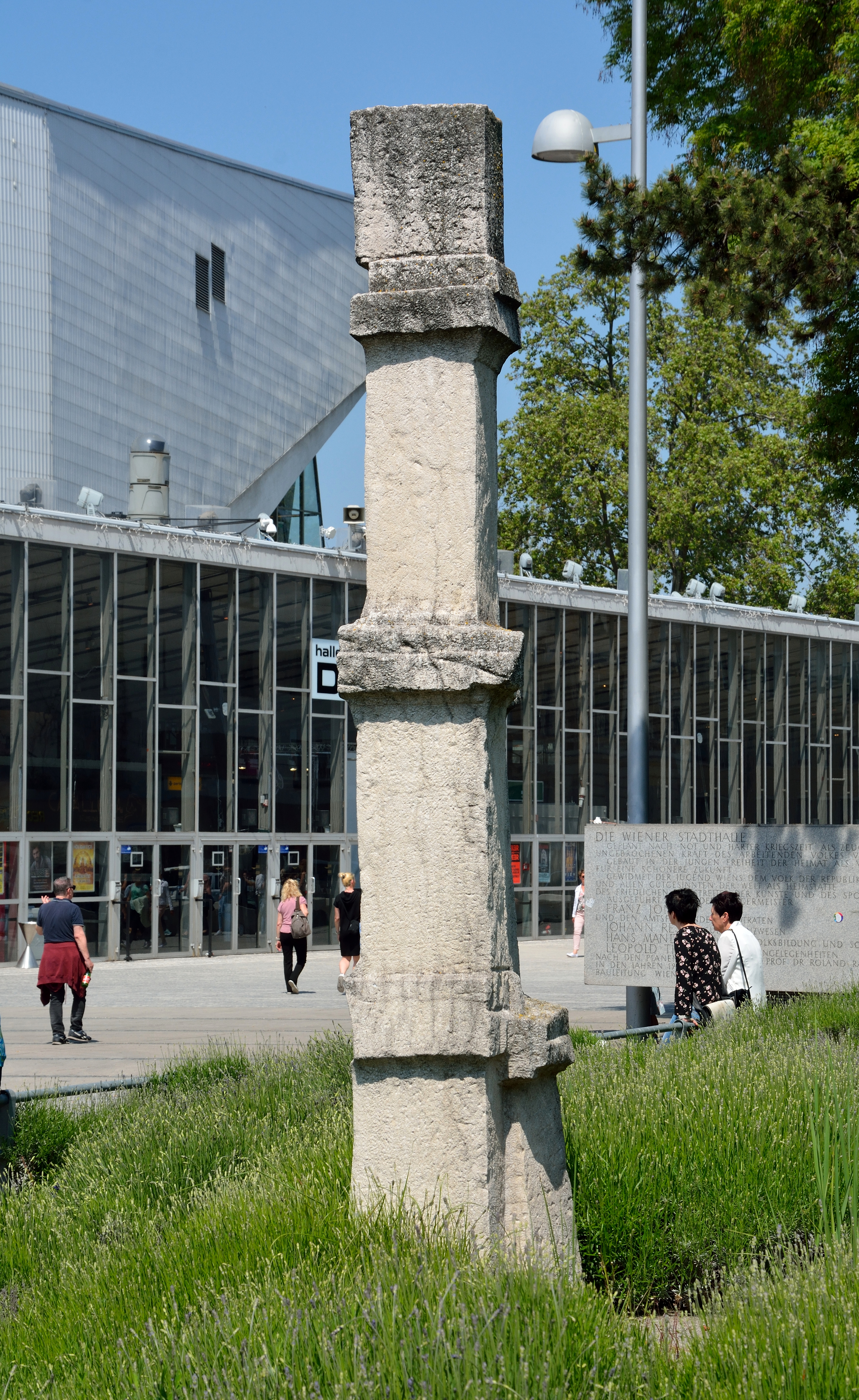
Stone sculpture "Zeichen" by Fritz Wotruba, outside Hall D, in Märzpark (2023)

== See also ==
- List of tennis stadiums by capacity
- List of indoor arenas in Austria

Events and tenants
Preceded by Palac Lodowy; Belgrade	European Indoor Championships in Athletics; Venue; 1970	Succeeded by Festiwalna; Sofia
Preceded by Håkons Hall; Lillehammer	European Men's Handball Championship; Final Venue; 2010	Succeeded by Belgrade Arena; Belgrade
Preceded by B&W Hallerne; Copenhagen	Eurovision Song Contest; Venue; 2015	Succeeded by Ericsson Globe; Stockholm
Preceded by Arena Stožice; Ljubljana	European Women's Handball Championship; Final Venue; 2024	Succeeded by Spodek; Katowice
Preceded by St. Jakobshalle; Basel	Eurovision Song Contest; Venue; 2026	Succeeded by Arena Burgas; Burgas
