= Georgie Aldous =

British model (born 1998)

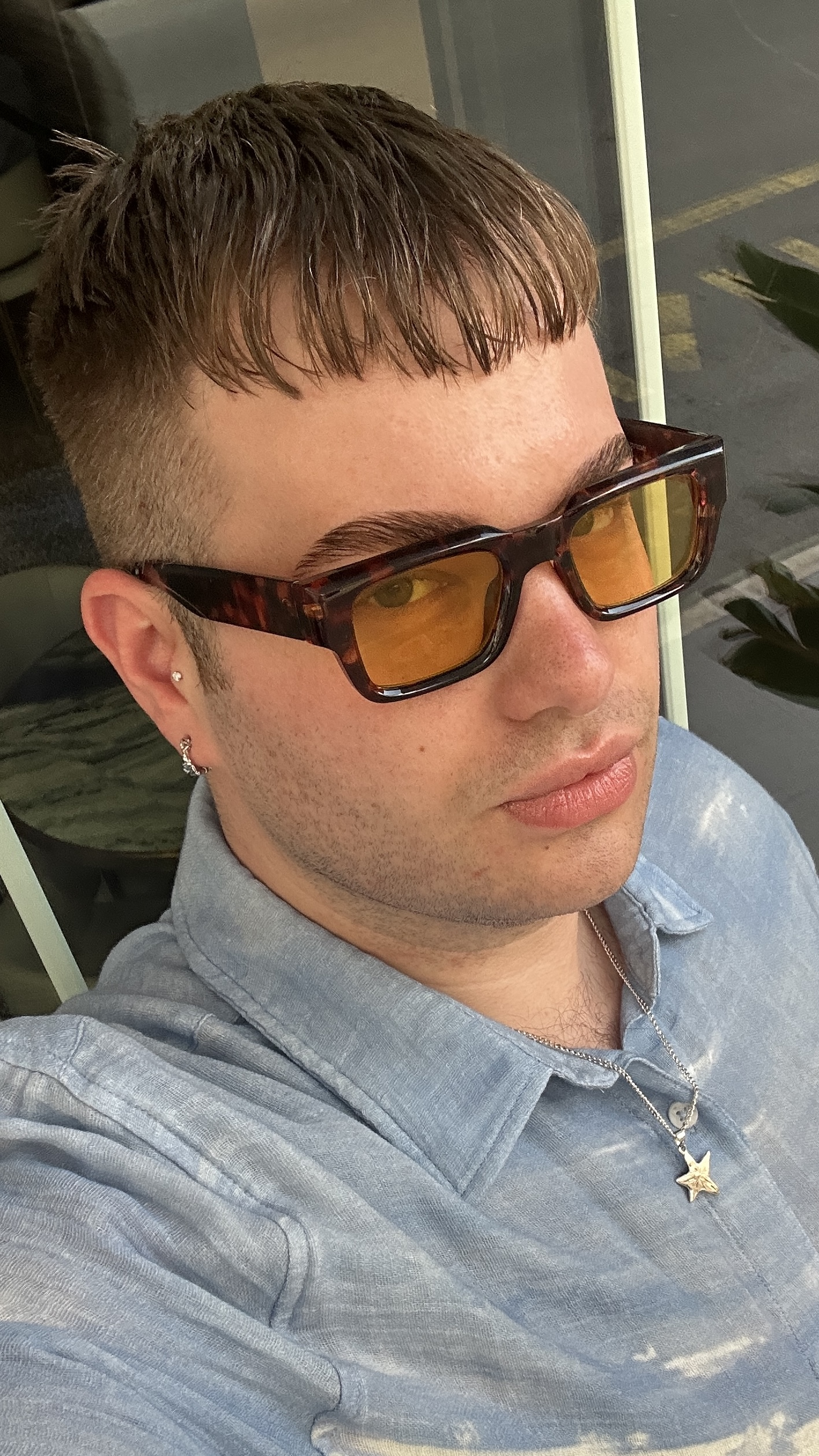
- Aldous in May 2026
- Born: Georgie James Aldous; 5 July 1998 (age 28); Great Yarmouth, England
- Education: Ormiston Venture Academy
- Occupations: Model; entrepreneur; influencer
- Years active: 2013-present
- Known for: Social activism
- Mother: Tracy Paulette Alford

Signature
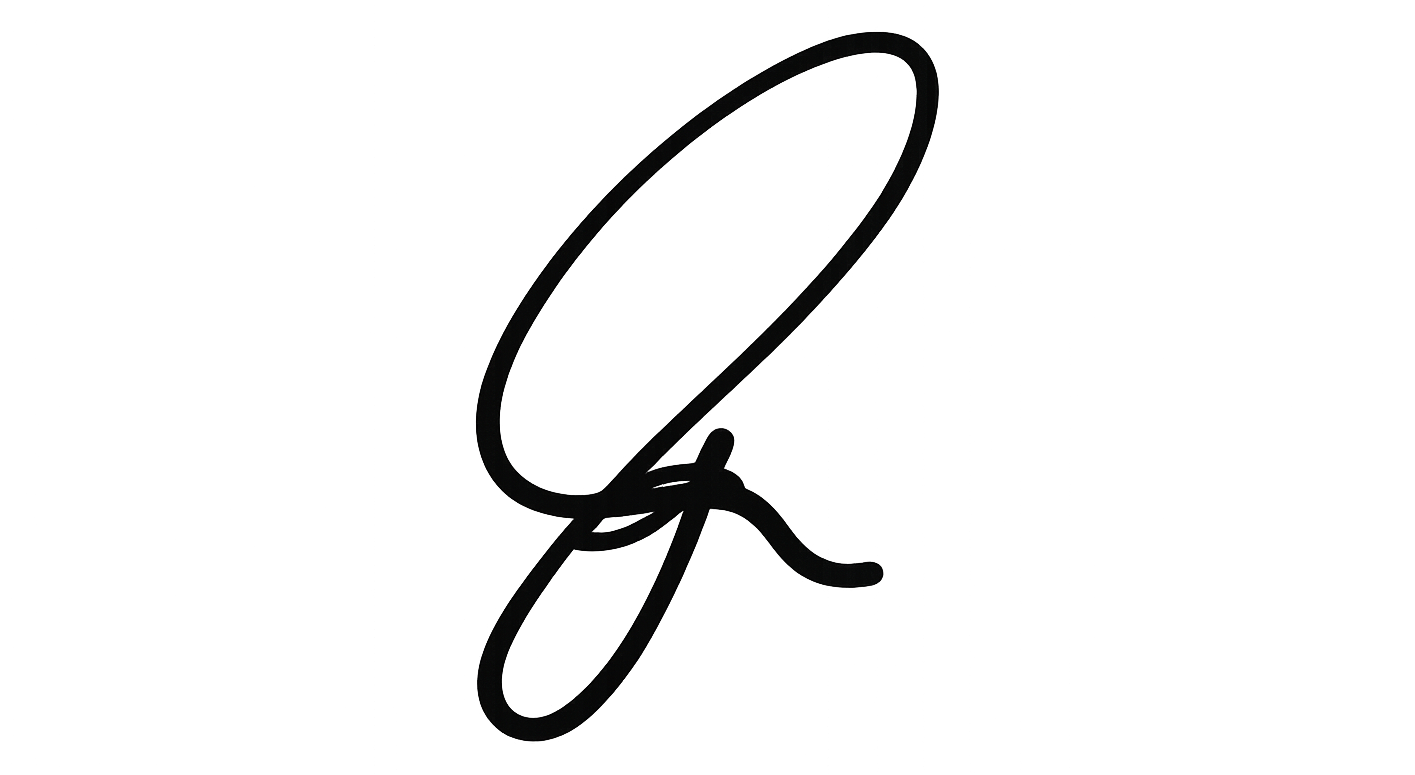

Georgie James Aldous (/ˈɔːldəs/ AWL-dəs; born 5 July 1998) is a British model, entrepreneur and influencer. In 2017 he became the first male beauty model for Superdrug, New Look and Primark, after launching a petition in 2016 to get more men on British make-up campaigns.

== Early life and education ==
Aldous was born in Great Yarmouth, Norfolk, England and attended Ormiston Venture Academy.

== Career ==
Aldous began posting vlogs on YouTube in 2013, using it as a way to overcome bullying and anxiety. He received verbal abuse in his hometown of Great Yarmouth for wearing make-up in public. He also stated he had received online abuse, including comments that him wearing make-up was against religion. By the age of 18 he was one of the top male beauty vloggers in the UK and the first British male beauty influencer to feature on Instagram's beauty report.

Aldous began experimenting with make-up after being bullied at school as a teenager. In 2016, he began campaigning for more men to be featured in British make-up campaigns after American makeup company CoverGirl announced it would be having its first CoverBoy, James Charles. He began a petition on Change.org titled #GetMenOnMakeupCampaigns, calling on major UK beauty brands to start including more men in their make-up campaigns. A year later in 2017, he became the first male beauty model for Superdrug, New Look and Primark.

== Business ventures ==
=== Georgie Cosmetics ===
In 2019, Aldous launched his eponymous make-up brand Georgie Cosmetics (stylized as GEORGIE COSMETICS), which was dissolved in 2022 for unknown reasons.

=== Pembroke Avenue ===
On 5 November 2025, Aldous launched his independent fragrance brand Pembroke Avenue in memory of his late mother Tracy Paulette Alford who died on 11 January 2022 from Non-Hodgkin lymphoma. In May 2026, Aldous paused running the brand due to his mental health and ADHD diagnosis.

== Social activism ==
=== Online pharmacies ===
Aldous campaigned for tighter restrictions on weight loss drugs. In 2024, he was hospitalized for side effects from using Mounjaro, including tachycardia, panic attacks and panic disorder. He called for online pharmacies to carry out stricter checks when issuing prescriptions for weight loss medication, and launched a petition in 2025 for the government to review the regulations for weight loss injections, as he feels that "the regulations for weight loss injections purchased publicly and privately are not strong enough to protect the user on their journey."

=== Animal rights ===
Aldous told British clothing brand New Look in an interview when he became their first male beauty model in 2017, that he believes "an animal shouldn't have to suffer for makeup", and that he would "never want to put an animal through suffering" for him to "look good". Aldous also stated that "there are so many brands that aren't testing on animals so there is no reason why you can't choose cruelty-free."

== Personal life ==
Aldous publicly came out as gay in 2015, at the age of 16, in a video on his YouTube channel. (Note: As of 15 August 2026, Aldous doesn't have an official YouTube channel or website.)

In 2016, after posting a photo of him wearing makeup on Facebook, Aldous' mother asked him if he wanted to be a woman and also if he wanted to be a transvestite.

Aldous has stated publicly that he struggles with his mental health and body dysmorphia, as well as having an eating disorder. He also admitted to previously having a marijuana dependency, stating that the national lockdown helped him quit his substance abuse.

In 2016 Aldous announced that he had lost 3 stone (42 lb; 19 kg) in three months by becoming vegan, but in 2017 he revealed that he had lied and that he was actually "addicted" to losing weight and the feeling of hunger. He also stated that he would train so much that he would feel faint, due to the lack of calories. He urged people to not starve themselves to lose weight or to meet expectations.

In 2026 Aldous was diagnosed with Attention deficit hyperactivity disorder.
