= Rowland Fisher =

British painter

- Born: 1885; Gorleston, Norfolk, England
- Died: 1969 (aged 83–84)
- Occupation: painter
- Known for: marine works in oil and watercolor
- Awards: Watts prize (1949)

Rowland Fisher (1885–1969) was a painter, mainly known for his seascapes.

Born in Gorleston, Norfolk, England, where he lived his whole life, Rowland Fisher was the son of a master mariner. He too originally wanted to go to sea, but was instead apprenticed to a timber yard where he worked for fifty years whilst painting in his spare time. His lifelong love of ships, shown in many of his seascapes, meant that he became an expert ship modeler. He sat for many hours in his house overlooking the harbor and watched the waves, skies and gulls. He is best known for his marine works in oil and watercolor, although he also painted Norfolk landscapes and well as continental scenes. He helped to found the Great Yarmouth and District Society of Artists and, following painting holidays, was elected a member of the St Ives Society of Artists.

He won the Watts prize in 1949 for the best picture portraying men working at sea. He was later made a member of ROI. He has influenced many of the later East Anglian landscape artists.

Exhibitions Include: The RA 1949, The RBA, RI, RWS as well as in Europe and East Anglia. He spent his entire career with a timber firm at Great Yarmouth. He also visited Cornwall and became associated with the St Ives community of painters there.

His work is represented in the Great Yarmouth Maritime Collection.
