= Ormiston Venture Academy =

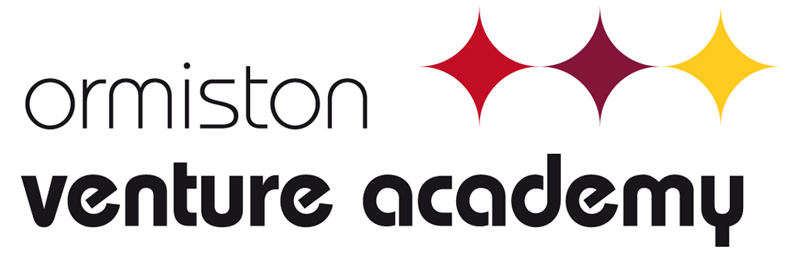

Location
- Oriel Avenue; Great Yarmouth, Norfolk, NR317JJ; England; 52.570°N 1.707°E

Information
- Type: Academy
- Motto: Venture into Success
- Established: 1954 (As Great Yarmouth Technical High School); 2010 (As Ormiston Venture Academy)
- Trust: Ormiston Academies Trust
- Department for Education URN: 136187 Tables
- Ofsted: Reports
- Chair of Governors: Lesley King
- Principal: Simon Gilbert-Barnham
- Gender: Co-educational
- Age: 11 to 16
- Enrolment: 852
- Houses: Aspire; Innovate; Create; Achieve
- Publication: Venture Voice
- Website: www.ormistonventureacademy.co.uk

Ormiston Venture Academy (formerly Oriel Specialist Mathematics and Computing College) is a secondary school with academy status located in Oriel Avenue, Gorleston in the English county of Norfolk. The school educates children aged 11 to 16. It is housed in a block constructed in 2008 and a second newer building that stands where the original building, constructed in 1954, was located. This building is E-Block, and it houses 4 classrooms. The present facility includes a new reception area, Learning Resource Centre, 4 science laboratories and classrooms; it was opened in March 2014 by alumnus Callum Cooke.

== History ==
Originally named Great Yarmouth Technical High School, it was opened in 1954 to replace the old Technical High School located in Southtown. It has gone through many different names, including Oriel Grammar School, Oriel High School and Oriel Specialist Maths and Computing College. In c 2007, its houses were: Trinity, Magdalen, Girton and Pembroke. Previously, when the Technical High School and the Oriel Grammar School the houses were Blue - Perebourne, Red - Fastolff, Yellow - Grenfell, and Green - Paget. Also Middleton were black and Nelson wearing white.

The current principal as of February 2013 is Simon Gilbert-Barnham. A new building was added to the site, by Net Zero Buildings, to accommodate the Humanities department. The school is sponsored by the Ormiston Academies Trust.

The school has been changed by a governing body of students called the UVS which changed systems like the canteen in recent years.

== Gresham's Scholarship ==
The school has a connection with the privately funded boarding school Gresham's in Holt, North Norfolk – whereby one student per academic year is offered a fully funded scholarship to study at Gresham's for two years. There have been 10 scholars so far.

== Teacher prohibition ==
In 2013, Gregory Hallam, employed at the school between 2007 and 2011, was banned from teaching indefinitely by the Teaching Regulatory Agency. He had made sexual comments to pupils and failed to keep to professional boundaries with them, and had used school computers to access pornography.
