= Horizontal (Bee Gees album) =

Studio album by the Bee Gees
- Released: January 1968
- Recorded: 17 July – 29 November 1967
- Studios: Central Sound (London); Chappell (London); IBC (London)
- Genres: Psychedelic rock; psychedelic pop; soft rock; art rock; baroque pop
- Length: 36:40
- Labels: Polydor; Atco (United States); Warner Bros. Records, Warner Music (reissued)
- Producers: Robert Stigwood, Bee Gees

The Bee Gees chronology
Bee Gees' 1st (1967)	Horizontal (1968)	Idea (1968)

1989 CD Reissue

Singles from Horizontal
- 1. "Massachusetts" Released: 19 September 1967 (UK) November 1967 (US); 2. "World" Released: December 1967 (UK); 3. "And the Sun Will Shine" Released: February 1968 (France)

Horizontal is the fourth studio album by the Bee Gees, and their second album to receive an international release. The LP was released in early 1968, and included the international hit singles "Massachusetts" and "World". On 5 February 2007, Reprise Records reissued Horizontal with both stereo and mono mixes on one disc and a bonus disc of unreleased songs, non-album tracks, and alternate takes. The album was released in Polydor in many countries and on Atco only in the US and Canada. "And the Sun Will Shine" (backed by "Really and Sincerely") was released as a single only in France. The influences displayed on the album range from the Beatles to baroque pop.

== Background ==
Around July 1967, the Gibb brothers sang backup vocals on Johnny Young's cover version of "Craise Finton Kirk Royal Academy of Arts" from Bee Gees' 1st, released as a single the following month. Also in July 1967, the Gibb brothers sang backup vocals on Oscar's cover version of "Holiday", with an orchestral arrangement by Bill Shepherd. Around July or August, Barry and Robin wrote "Cowman, Milk Your Cow", which was recorded by Adam Faith, with the Gibb brothers on background vocals, Russ Ballard and Pete Salt on guitars (though one source would suggest the latter was in fact Fleetwood Mac's Peter Green), Milt Rogan on bass and Bob Henrit on drums.

== Recording ==
The Bee Gees began their first studio session for Horizontal on 17 July 1967 just three months after the last session for Bee Gees' 1st and three days after that album's release. The earliest session for Horizontal was really just a demo date to tape rough versions of the brothers' new songs. Venturing to Denmark Street (known as London's Tin Pan Alley), the Bee Gees booked Central Sound for 17 July, quickly cutting several tracks.

It's more of us doing what we wanted to do, the 1st album was like trying to make a band out of us. The second album was more of the three brothers wanting our own way, wanting to experiment.

— Barry Gibb

We started to experiment in Horizontal away from everything they'd previously done. Not that there was anything wrong with what they'd previously done it was terrific. They just started to experiment more with sounds and arrangements.

— Vince Melouney

They started to record the songs for this album on 17 July. The songs recorded on that day were "Ring My Bell", "And the Sun Will Shine" and "Day Time Girl". On 25 July, they re-recorded "And the Sun Will Shine" but it was rejected, and instead more work was done later on the first version. On 30 July, they recorded "Birdie Told Me", "Ring My Bell", "All So Lonely!" (written by Colin Petersen or Vince Melouney), "Barker of the UFO" and "Harry Braff". On 31 August, they recorded "Vince's Number", written by the brothers for guitarist Vince Melouney to sing but ultimately dropped. The first two takes of "Harry Braff" was recorded during the Bee Gees' 1st sessions, but they recorded a third take and that version was included on Horizontal.

"Words", Sinking Ships", "Barker of the UFO" and "Sir Geoffrey Saved the World" were recorded during this album's sessions. Though none were included on the album, they all featured on singles. "Words" was a massive worldwide hit while the other three all appeared on B-sides. The leftovers from the Horizontal sessions, "Out of Line", "Ring My Bell", "Mrs. Gillespie's Refrigerator", "Deeply Deeply Me", "All My Christmases Came at Once", "Thank You for Christmas" and the medley "Silent Night/Mary's Boy Child" (the latter erroneously listed as "Hark the Herald Angels Sing", a different Christmas carol from which the phrase had been lifted for the lyric) were released on the 2006 remastered version of Horizontal on Reprise Records. Bill Shepherd's orchestra probably served to give The Gibb Brothers critical feedback on the songs since Shepherd's accompaniment is not just added to finished tracks but an integral part of the arrangement.

"The Change Is Made" was recorded on 29 November 1967 at IBC Studios, London with lead vocals by Barry Gibb. It was also the last song recorded which was included on the album. Barry has said that "The Change Is Made" was born out of the brothers' love of R&B. According to Robin Gibb: "Otis Redding, and people like the Stax artists influenced some songs -- "I Can't See Nobody" and "To Love Somebody. I remember that was done at 2 o'clock in the morning. It started out as a writing session which – Barry evolved." Guitarist Vince Melouney has since spoken fondly about his guitar solo on the track, as well as the album as a whole.

"Horizontal" was written by all three brothers; recorded on 7 September and 28 October with "Lemons Never Forget", it was released as the last track on the album. Barry Gibb sings lead on the verses while Robin Gibb sings lead on the refrain. Robin Gibb noted on the album notes that the song is "the end of sorrow, the end of bad stuff. It does have a positive message somewhere in there."

As the album reached completion, the Bee Gees closed out the year taping two songs for a television program How on Earth as it was televised at the Liverpool Cathedral.

== Release ==
The album's release was followed by a Scandinavian tour, with concerts in Copenhagen, Stockholm and Gothenburg. On the group's return to England, they recorded their third BBC session at the Playhouse Theatre at London's Northumberland Avenue with a 19-member orchestra under the direction of Bill Shepherd.

== Release and reception ==
Professional ratings
Review scores
Source	Rating
AllMusic	3.5/5 stars
The Rolling Stone Album Guide	1.5/5 stars

US cover of Horizontal.

After Horizontal was released, it seemed to get mixed reactions from fans, probably owing to it having a darker lyrical tone and a heavier musical sound than Bee Gees 1st. This was also the last Bee Gees album for some time that critics didn't accuse of being lightweight. Horizontal was considered the heaviest album ever recorded by the Bee Gees, due for the most part to an increased influence asserted by guitarist Vince Melouney and drummer Colin Petersen. The album cover for the American release was changed slightly in that the photo of the group was reversed and was adorned with an oval picture frame.

According to lead guitarist Vince Melouney:

It was a band effort. We all felt that we were a part of one thing, we'd just try different things. It wasn't like it was the Gibb brothers, Colin (Petersen-drummer) and me. We were all in the Bee Gees together! 'Horizontal' made its way into the top 20 worldwide and helped cement the Bee Gees place as real contenders. And this was only the beginning!

Allmusic's Bruce Eder describes some songs in the album: "World" as 'a poignant, even somber yet gorgeous ballad filled with clever lyrics, and highlighted by a quavering Mellotron accompaniment, a very close grand piano sound and twangy fuzz-tone guitar' and "And the Sun Will Shine" as 'an even more serious, regretful ballad that is bearable because it is also prettier than "World"', and "Harry Braff" as 'cheerful'.

== Track listing ==
All tracks are written by Barry, Robin and Maurice Gibb.

Side one
No.	Title	Lead vocals	Length
1.	"World"	Barry and Robin	3:20
2.	"And the Sun Will Shine"	Robin	3:26
3.	"Lemons Never Forget"	Barry	2:59
4.	"Really and Sincerely"	Robin	3:29
5.	"Birdie Told Me"	Barry	2:19
6.	"With the Sun in My Eyes"	Barry	2:34

Side two
No.	Title	Lead vocals	Length
1.	"Massachusetts"	Robin and Barry	2:19
2.	"Harry Braff"	Robin (with Barry and Maurice)	3:13
3.	"Day Time Girl"	Robin and Maurice	2:30
4.	"The Earnest of Being George"	Barry	2:37
5.	"The Change Is Made"	Barry	3:29
6.	"Horizontal"	Barry and Robin	3:30

Horizontal - 2006 edition (Disc 2)
No.	Title	Lead vocals	Length
1.	"Out of Line"	Barry and Robin	3:00
2.	"Ring My Bell"	Barry and Robin	2:14
3.	"Barker of the UFO"	Barry	1:48
4.	"Words"	Barry	3:13
5.	"Sir Geoffrey Saved the World"	Robin and Barry	2:14
6.	"Sinking Ships"	Barry, Robin and Maurice	2:21
7.	"Really and Sincerely" (Alternate version)	Robin	3:17
8.	"Swan Song" (Alternate version)	Barry	3:02
9.	"Mrs. Gillespie's Refrigerator"	Barry and Robin	2:14
10.	"Deeply Deeply Me"	Robin	3:03
11.	"All My Christmases Came at Once"	Robin and Barry	2:58
12.	"Thank You for Christmas"	Robin	1:51
13.	"Silent Night"/"Hark! The Herald Angels Sing" (medley)	Robin and Barry	2:44

== Personnel ==
Credits from Bee Gees historian and sessionographer Joseph Brennan.

Bee Gees

- Barry Gibb – lead vocals, harmony and backing vocals, rhythm guitar
- Robin Gibb – lead vocals, harmony and backing vocals, organ
- Maurice Gibb – harmony and backing vocals, bass, piano, Mellotron
- Vince Melouney – lead guitar
- Colin Petersen – drums

Additional musicians and production

- Bill Shepherd – orchestral arrangement
- Bee Gees – producers
- Robert Stigwood – producer
- Mike Claydon, Damon Lyon Shaw, John Pantry – engineer

== Charts ==
=== Weekly charts ===
Chart (1968)	Position
Australian Kent Music Report	8
Finnish Soumen Virallinen Albums Chart	2
French SNEP Albums Chart	2
Norwegian VG-lista Albums Chart	7
UK Albums Chart	16
US Billboard 200	12
US Cashbox Albums	8
West German Media Control Albums Chart	1

=== Year-end charts ===
Chart (1968)	Position
German Albums Chart	3
Norwegian VG-lista Albums Chart	14
