= Really and Sincerely =

Single by Bee Gees

from the album Horizontal
- A-side: "And the Sun Will Shine" (France) "Let There Be Love" (Netherlands)
- Released: February 1968; 1970 (Netherlands)
- Recorded: 29 November 1967
- Genre: Baroque Pop
- Length: 3:27 (stereo); 3:29 (mono)
- Label: Polydor (United Kingdom); Atco (United States)
- Songwriter: Barry, Robin & Maurice Gibb
- Producers: Robert Stigwood, Bee Gees

"Really and Sincerely" is a song by the Bee Gees. Written by Barry, Robin & Maurice Gibb in 1967 and released in 1968 on the album Horizontal, it is also featured as the B-side of "And the Sun Will Shine" in France. It was issued in 1970 as the B-side single to "Let There Be Love".

According to Bruce Eder of Allmusic, "the song descends into an even more emotionally melodramatic mood than "And the Sun Will Shine"".

== Writing and recording ==
Its first version (which featured piano instead of organ as the song was written on and ultimately released with) was recorded on November 28th at IBC Studios. This version was released in 2006 on The Studio Albums 1967-1968. The second take, recorded the following day, was chosen for the album. This track was Robin's musical response to his involvement in the Hither Green rail crash, a resigned meditation on trying reach out to someone, as Robin explained: "I was in the Hither Green train crash, and it’s kind of a song after that". Robin's girlfriend and future wife, Molly Hullis, was in the crash with him. Robin added: "It was kind of about our relationship at the time, so it had a personal tone to it, We nearly got killed. It was written on a piano accordion that I bought in Paris. Particularly the chorus was written on that in Paris the first night I bought it".

== Track listing ==
All tracks written and composed by Barry, Robin & Maurice Gibb.

No.	Title	Length
1.	"And the Sun Will Shine"	3:26
2.	"Really and Sincerely"	3:29

== Personnel ==
- Robin Gibb — lead vocals, accordion, Hammond organ
- Barry Gibb — guitar
- Maurice Gibb — bass guitar
- Bill Shepherd — orchestral arrangement
