= World (Bee Gees song) =

Single by the Bee Gees

from the album Horizontal
- B-side: "Sir Geoffrey Saved the World"
- Released: November 1967
- Recorded: 3, 28 October 1967
- Studio: IBC (London)
- Genre: Psychedelic pop
- Length: 3:20
- Label: Polydor (United Kingdom)
- Songwriters: Barry Gibb; Robin Gibb; Maurice Gibb
- Producers: Robert Stigwood; Bee Gees

The Bee Gees UK singles chronology
| "Massachusetts" (1967) | "World" (1967) | "Words" (1968) |

Audio sample
- "World": file; help

"World" is a song by the British musical group Bee Gees, released in 1967 as a single in the United Kingdom and elsewhere in Europe and then included on their album Horizontal the following year. Though it was a big hit in Europe, Atco Records did not issue it as a single in the United States, having just issued a third single from Bee Gees' 1st, "Holiday".

== Recording and composition ==
The song's first recording session was on 3 October 1967 along with "With the Sun in My Eyes" and "Words". The song's last recording session was on 28 October 1967. "World" was originally planned as having no orchestra, so was recorded on four tracks, including some piano played by Maurice and organ played by Robin. When it was decided to add an orchestra, the four tracks containing the band were mixed to one track and the orchestra was added to the other track. The stereo mix consequently suffered since the second tape had to play as mono until the end when the orchestra comes in on one side. Barry adds: "'World' is one of those things we came up with in the studio, Everyone just having fun and saying, 'Let's just do something!' you know". Vince Melouney recalls: "I had this idea to play the melody right up in the top register of the guitar behind the chorus". The song's lyrics question the singer's purpose in life.

== Release ==
In 1990, Bill Inglot synched up the two tape reels and made a new stereo mix for the Tales from the Brothers Gibb box set. Two mixes of the record were played to journalists at a press conference before its release. The released version is mainly the unorchestrated version but the orchestrated version is used from 2:39. The track features Robin on mellotron and Maurice on double-tracked piano. The vocals are mostly by Barry but Robin sings the chorus a few times prior to the fadeout.

Allmusic's Donald A. Guarisco described this song as "a thoroughly psychedelic ballad worthy of the Moody Blues' finest similar efforts". The original promotional video for "World" is black and white.

== Personnel ==
- Barry Gibb – lead vocals, rhythm guitar
- Robin Gibb – mellotron, lead vocals on closing choruses
- Maurice Gibb – bass, piano
- Vince Melouney – lead guitar
- Colin Petersen – drums
- Bill Shepherd – orchestral arrangement

== Chart performance ==
=== Peak positions ===
| Chart (1968) | Peak position |
|---|---|
| Australia (Kent Music Report) | 6 |
| Austria (Ö3 Austria Top 40) | 5 |
| Belgium (Ultratop 50) | 3 |
| Denmark | 4 |
| Finland (Soumen Virallinen) | 10 |
| France (SNEP) | 20 |
| Germany (Media Control Charts) | 1 |
| Italy (FIMI) | 10 |
| Japan (Oricon) | 24 |
| Netherlands (Dutch Top 40) | 1 |
| New Zealand (Recorded Music NZ) | 2 |
| Norway (VG-lista) | 6 |
| Singapore | 1 |
| Spain (AFE) | 10 |
| Sweden (Kvällstoppen) | 3 |
| Sweden (Tio i Topp) | 4 |
| Switzerland (Swiss Hitparade) | 2 |
| UK Singles (Official Charts Company) | 9 |

=== Year-end charts ===
| Chart (1968) | Position |
|---|---|
| Austria (Ö3 Austria Top 40) | 5 |
| Netherlands (Dutch Top 40) | 18 |
| Norway (VG-lista) | 8 |
| Switzerland (Swiss Hitparade) | 9 |
