= Massachusetts (Bee Gees song) =

1967 single by Bee Gees

Single by the Bee Gees

from the album Horizontal
- B-side: "Barker of the UFO" (UK); "Sir Geoffrey Saved the World" (US)
- Released: 19 September 1967
- Recorded: 9–17 August 1967
- Studio: IBC (Portland Place, London)
- Genre: Pop; country; psychedelia
- Length: 2:22
- Label: Polydor (UK); Atco (US)
- Songwriters: Barry Gibb; Robin Gibb; Maurice Gibb
- Producers: Robert Stigwood; Bee Gees

The Bee Gees UK singles chronology
"To Love Somebody" (1967)	"Massachusetts" (1967)	"World" (1967)

The Bee Gees US singles chronology
"Holiday" (1967)	"Massachusetts" (1967)	"Words" (1968)

Audio sample
- "Massachusetts": file; help

Music video
- "Massachusetts" on YouTube

"Massachusetts (The Lights Went Out In)" is a song by the Bee Gees, written by Barry, Robin and Maurice Gibb and released in 1967. Robin Gibb sang lead vocals on this song and it would become one of his staple songs to perform during both Bee Gees concerts and his solo appearances. It later appeared on their 1968 album, Horizontal.

The song became the first of the group's five No. 1 hits on the UK Singles Chart, reached No. 1 in 12 other countries, peaked at No. 11 on the US Billboard Hot 100 and eventually sold over five million copies worldwide. When the brothers wrote the song, they had never been to Massachusetts. In a UK television special on ITV in December 2011, it was voted third (behind "How Deep Is Your Love" and "You Win Again") in "The Nation's Favourite Bee Gees Song".

== Writing and inspiration ==
The song was written in the Regis Hotel, New York City during a tour of the United States. The song was intended as an antithesis to flower power anthems of the time such as "Let's Go to San Francisco" and "San Francisco (Be Sure to Wear Flowers in Your Hair)" in that the protagonist had been to San Francisco to join the hippies but was now homesick. The idea of the lights having gone out in Massachusetts was to suggest that everyone had gone to San Francisco.

There are two different memories, Robin remembers us doing it in a boat going around New York City. And I remember us checking in at the St. Regis with Robert, going to the suite, and while the bags were being brought in we were so high on being in New York, that's how 'Massachusetts' began. I think we were strumming basically the whole thing, and then I think we went on a boat round New York. I don't know if we finished it, but I think that's where the memories collide. Everybody wrote it. All three of us were there when the song was born.

— Barry Gibb

The song was originally intended for The Seekers. Upon arriving in London from Australia (following in the path of the Seekers, who had arrived several years earlier) the Bee Gees had been unsuccessful in getting the song to the group, so they recorded it themselves. During a chance meeting in London between the Seekers' lead singer Judith Durham and Maurice Gibb, Durham learned that "Massachusetts" was originally intended for her group and in 2003 the Seekers recorded the song as a tribute to Maurice following his death earlier that year.

The Bee Gees had never actually been to Massachusetts when they recorded the song; they just liked the unusual sound of the name, containing the repeated letter 'S'.

== Recording ==
"Massachusetts" was recorded on 9 August 1967, along with "Sir Geoffrey Saved the World", at the IBC Studios in London and finished on 17 August. Barry feels Bill Shepherd's orchestral score is perhaps the arranger's finest: "We never expected him to do that. Sometimes we would sing what we would [imagine] the strings doing. But in this case he did that himself, and I thought it was great. 'Massachusetts' was our first #1 in England".

== Release ==
Before the release of this song, Australians Colin Petersen and Vince Melouney were facing deportation, and it appeared that they might have to leave the band as a result. On 12 August, British fans staged a protest on behalf of the musicians at the cottage of Prime Minister Harold Wilson. Three days later Bee Gees fan Deirdre Meehan chained and handcuffed herself to Buckingham Palace to protest the possible deportation. Ultimately, the musicians were allowed to stay.

On 27 August 1967, Beatles' manager Brian Epstein told Maurice Gibb that "'Massachusetts' is a great song that would be very successful." Epstein died later that night.

When it was released in the UK, the title was "Massachusetts (The Lights Went Out in)" but the subtitle was later dropped. In America, Atco Records delayed it to release "Holiday". The song "Massachusetts" has a minor claim to fame in the history of British radio as it was the second record played on BBC Radio 1. The first song to be played was "Flowers in the Rain" by The Move. It was the first No. 1 hit single by a non-Japanese artist on Japan's official hit chart, Oricon Singles Chart, on 1 April 1968, and would end up as the band's biggest selling single there.

Cash Box said that it is "a splendidly arranged ballad somewhat in the Scott McKenzie bag."

== Personnel ==
- Robin Gibb – lead and harmony vocals
- Barry Gibb – lead, harmony and backing vocals; rhythm guitar
- Maurice Gibb – harmony and backing vocals, bass guitar, piano, Mellotron
- Vince Melouney – rhythm guitar
- Colin Petersen – drums
- Bill Shepherd – orchestral arrangement

== Charts ==
=== Weekly charts ===
Chart (1967–1968)	Peak position
Australia (Kent Music Report)	2
Austria (Ö3 Austria Top 40)	1
Belgium (Ultratop 50)	1
Canada (RPM) Top Singles	3
Denmark (Tracklisten)	2
Finland (Soumen Virallinen)	17
France (SNEP)	4
Ireland (IRMA)	2
Italy (FIMI)	5
Japan (Oricon Singles Chart)	1
Netherlands (Dutch Top 40)	1
New Zealand (Recorded Music NZ)	1
Norway (VG-lista)	1
South Africa (Springbok Radio)	1
Sweden (Kvällstoppen)	1
Sweden (Tio i Topp)	1
Switzerland (Schweizer Hitparade)	2
UK Singles (Official Charts Company)	1
US Billboard Hot 100	11
West Germany (Media Control Charts)	1

Chart (2012)	Peak position
France (SNEP)	185

=== Year-end charts ===
Chart (1967)	Position
Austria (Ö3 Austria Top 40)	6
Belgium (Ultratop 50)	20
Netherlands (Dutch Top 40)	17
Switzerland (Schweizer Hitparade)	9

Chart (1968)	Position
Norway Singles Chart (VG-lista)	8

== Certifications ==
Region	Certification	Certified units/sales
Germany	—	2,000,000
France	—	220,000
Japan	—	517,000
New Zealand (RMNZ)	Gold	
United Kingdom	—	300,000
United Kingdom (BPI) 2009 release	Silver	200,000^{‡}
Summaries
Worldwide	—	5,000,000
^{‡} Sales+streaming figures based on certification alone.

== Notable cover versions ==
- Yugoslav rock band Siluete recorded a version of the song in 1967 for the Yugoslav TV show Koncert za ludi mladi svet (A Concert for Crazy Young World). The video for the song was shot in the Wild West town settings in the Avala Film Studios.
- The Seekers recorded this song following the death of Maurice Gibb.
- Rita Wilson and Leslie Odom, Jr. covered the song in 2022 for Wilson's album Rita Wilson Now & Forever: Duets.
