= Hermione Hammond =

English painter

- Born: 11 August 1910; Hexham, Northumberland, England
- Died: 29 July 2005 (aged 94); London, England
- Movement: Painter

Hermione Hammond (11 August 1910 – 29 July 2005) was an English painter who is most famous for her paintings of London damaged by the Blitz during World War II.

Born in Hexham, Northumberland, to an artist mother and an invalid father, Hermione Hammond had one brother and one sister. Rolt was a civil engineer who became a freelance journalist and wrote 26 books, notably engineering textbooks; Rosemary wrote music and assisted the composer Peter Maxwell Davies when he taught at Cirencester Grammar School. She attended the Francis Holland School in London (one of her schoolmates was actress Joyce Grenfell). She went on to study art at the Chelsea Polytechnic, then at the Royal Academy Schools, under Walter Russell and Tom Monnington. She learned mural decoration at the Royal College of Art and attended night classes in etching.

She supported herself by winning prizes and doing odd jobs. One such job was the altarpiece in the ecumenical chapel of Heriot-Watt University, Edinburgh, another was the altarpiece at Marlborough House School, Tenterden. After winning the competition to decorate the ceiling of the new Senate House of London University in 1937 she gained a Rome Scholarship (to The British School at Rome) in 1938, but her studies there were cut short by the outbreak of war. With an added sense of urgency, she absorbed all she could of the Italian Renaissance in Rome, Florence, Arezzo and Ravenna. Hammond left Mussolini's Italy for England via Switzerland.

Hammond's best friend was Neville Chamberlain's daughter, Dorothy; she visited Chequers on several occasions.

In 1949 resumed her professional career which continued until the 1990s. She died, aged 94, in 2005.
