= And the Sun Will Shine =

1968 song by the Bee Gees

- Label from the France single

Single by Bee Gees

from the album Horizontal
- B-side: "Really and Sincerely" (France)
- Released: February 1968
- Recorded: 17, 30 July, 1, 10 August, 28 October 1967
- Genre: Folk, baroque pop
- Length: 3:26 (mono); 3:33 (stereo)
- Label: Polydor, Philips (UK); Atco (US)
- Songwriter: Barry, Robin & Maurice Gibb
- Producers: Robert Stigwood, Bee Gees

"And the Sun Will Shine" is a song by the Bee Gees, written by Barry Gibb, Robin Gibb and Maurice Gibb and released in February 1968 on the album Horizontal.

It was released as a single in France, backed with "Really and Sincerely", and reached #66 there.

The song has been recorded by singers Paul Jones (in 1968), José Feliciano (UK no. 25 hit in 1969) and Claudia Brücken (in 2012).

== Background and recording ==
The earliest session for Horizontal was really just a demo date to tape rough versions of the brothers' new songs. Venturing to Denmark Street (known as London's Tin Pan Alley), the Bee Gees booked Central Sound for July 17, quickly cutting several tracks.

Barry Gibb recalls the recording of this track:

"'And the Sun Will Shine' was a one-day event, I remember very well the engineer in that studio had a trap door in the ceiling where the soundproof room was! They must have decided that the engineer needed to be safe. You could make as much music as possible, but you couldn't get up into that soundproof room. And The Sun Will Shine' definitely had the potential to be something and, in fact, that's what we ended up with, the song on the spot. We never rerecorded it".

— Barry Gibb

Robin Gibb said:

That's one of my favorites too, It was a very emotional song, but a lot of the words just came ad-libbed. The song actually wasn't planned. We just played the record down and sang it as we felt it. We kept the original demo the way it was and [later] just added the orchestra. It's got a great feeling to it, a great atmosphere, sometimes you know you can't recapture that feeling if you keep recording something.

— Robin Gibb

This song was the second track they recorded for the album after "Ring My Bell" (which was only released on the 2006 deluxe edition of Horizontal). This song was recorded on July 17 and 30, continued on August 1 and 10 and finally finished on October 28, The second version of this song was recorded on July 25 but it was rejected. This song has a solo vocal that Robin famously did in one take, inventing some of the lyrics on the spot.

== Personnel ==
- Robin Gibb – vocal
- Barry Gibb – guitar
- Maurice Gibb – bass, piano
- Vince Melouney – guitar
- Colin Petersen – drums

== Live performances ==
The first live performances of this song were in 1968 most notably on 4 February 1968 on the US TV show The Smothers Brothers, their first American performance. Other notable recorded performances were at Melbourne, Australia in 1974 on their Mr. Natural tour and a short excerpt on the 1998 live album One Night Only.

== Chart performance ==
Chart (1968)	Peak position
French Singles Chart	66

== Paul Jones version ==
"And the Sun Will Shine"

Single by Paul Jones
- B-side: "The Dog Presides"
- Released: 8 March 1968 (UK)
- Recorded: Abbey Road Studios
- Genre: Baroque pop
- Label: Columbia
- Songwriter: Barry, Robin & Maurice Gibb
- Producer: Peter Asher

Paul Jones singles chronology
"When I Was Six Years Old" (1968)	"And the Sun Will Shine" (1968)	"Aquarius" (1968)

In the same year, former Manfred Mann frontman Paul Jones recorded the song and released his version as a single, backed with his own song "The Dog Presides".

With Paul McCartney on drums, Jeff Beck on guitar, Paul Samwell-Smith of The Yardbirds on bass and Nicky Hopkins on keyboards, it was produced by Peter Asher, formerly of Peter and Gordon. McCartney's contribution was not credited on Columbia release of the song. Recorded at Abbey Road Studios' Studio 2. Asher had asked McCartney to attend the session and he ended up playing drums on the song.

On the liner notes of The Paul Jones Collection (CD), Jones claimed that "Paul McCartney was on drums on that session, It was during the time I used to hang out with Peter Asher and Paul wanted to play drums because he could".

=== Personnel ===
- Paul Jones – lead vocal/harmonica
- Jeff Beck – guitar
- Paul Samwell-Smith – bass
- Nicky Hopkins – keyboards
- Paul McCartney – drums

== José Feliciano version ==
In August 1969 Puerto Rican singer José Feliciano released a cover of the song as a single on RCA Records, backed with his own composition "Rain". In late October 1969 the Feliciano version reached no. 25 in the UK singles chart. The version notably features Feliciano singing "The thought to me is back and how near" as opposed to "'Cause love to me is life and I live you", an example of a Mondegreen.
