= Kitty Can =

Single by the Bee Gees

from the album Idea
- A-side: "I've Gotta Get a Message to You"
- Released: 7 September 1968
- Recorded: 12 June 1968
- Genre: Psychedelic pop
- Length: 2:31 (mono); 2:38 (stereo); 2:36 (stereo, with orchestra)
- Label: Polydor (United Kingdom); Atco (United States)
- Songwriter: Barry, Robin & Maurice Gibb
- Producers: Robert Stigwood, Bee Gees

Bee Gees flipsides singles chronology
"The Singer Sang His Song" (1968)	"Kitty Can" (1968)	"Kilburn Towers" (1968)

"Kitty Can" is a song by the Bee Gees, composed by Barry, Robin and Maurice Gibb. It was released as the B-side of "I've Gotta Get a Message to You" in July 1968, and as the second track on the album Idea in September 1968. In 1973, RSO Records released a compilation called Kitty Can only in Argentina and Uruguay, and this song appeared as the first track on that album.

== Background ==
Barry Gibb told Andrew Sandoval: "'Kitty Can' was written by Maurice and I, during a night with Maurice and Lulu at their place in London, the early apartment they shared before they moved to Hampstead".

The Bee Gees began work on "Kitty Can" at IBC Studios on 12 June 1968, along with three other songs – "I.O.I.O.", "Let There Be Love" and the unreleased track "No Name". This was their first session using the studio's newly installed eight-track recording equipment.

Joseph Brennan writes: "The eight-track equipment was built in the USA for standard American voltage, so IBC had to supply power to it through an intermediate device that proved somewhat unstable. The mono and stereo mixes ended up at more or less different speeds...." As a result, the mono version of "Kitty Can" runs significantly faster than the stereo version.

The Studio Albums 1967-1968 includes both the mono and stereo mixes, as well as an alternative stereo version with orchestration by Bill Shepherd. A demo version of the song, which has not been officially released, is reportedly similar to the final version but has "some additional ad-libbed almost jazz scat backing vocals" (probably by Maurice). Maurice's higher vocal is more prevalent on this version.

A promotional film for the song was produced which was later discovered and broadcast by the Oldies music channel 192TV.

== Track listing ==
No.	Title	Writer(s)	Length
1.	"I've Gotta Get a Message to You"	Barry Gibb, Robin Gibb, Maurice Gibb	2:59
2.	"Kitty Can"	Barry Gibb, Robin Gibb, Maurice Gibb	2:31

== Personnel ==
- Barry Gibb — Lead and harmony vocal, guitar
- Maurice Gibb — Lead and harmony vocal, bass
- Vince Melouney — guitar
- Colin Petersen — drums
