= Idea (TV program) =

- Genre: Musical
- Directed by: Jean-Christophe Averty
- Starring: Barry Gibb; Robin Gibb; Maurice Gibb; Colin Petersen; Vince Melouney; Brian Auger; The Trinity; Julie Driscoll; Lil Lindfors
- Composers: B.Gibb/R.Gibb/M.Gibb except Vince Melouney (Such a Shame); Bob Dylan (The Wheel's On Fire); Brian Auger, Roger Sutton (Break It Up); David Ackles (Road to Cairo); Donovan Leitch (Season of the Witch); Brian Auger, Julie Driscoll (Shadows of You)
- Original language: English

Production
- Producer: Michèle Arnaud

Original release
- Network: ZDF
- Release: 11 December 1968

Idea is a television special starring the Bee Gees with Brian Auger and The Trinity, Julie Driscoll and Lil Lindfors. It was aired on 11 December 1968 on Zweites Deutsches Fernsehen (ZDF). The TV special was produced by Michèle Arnaud and directed by Jean-Christophe Averty. Belgian artist Guy Peellaert provided art direction.

== Background ==
On 12 September 1968, the Bee Gees flew to Brussels and spent two weeks recording a television show directed by Jean-Christophe Averty to promote their album Idea on French television. It features the guest appearances by Brian Auger and The Trinity, Julie Driscoll and Lil Lindfors. Swedish singer Lil Lindfors performed "Words" in her native language. The Bee Gees performed the songs from Horizontal and Idea (1968). The special effects on "Indian Gin and Whisky Dry" to make it appear that the Bee Gees are bouncing up and down in the glasses. On "I Started a Joke" features floating question marks.

During the Bee Gees' stay in Brussels, the Belgian police would not allow their limousine to stop outside the hotel, The Metropole, due to a fashion show held there by French pop star Johnny Hallyday's wife Sylvie Vartan. Maurice's leg was injured as he attempted to get out of the car, leading to a formal complaint being filed with a chief of police by the Bee Gees' manager Robert Stigwood.

== Songs ==
1. Bee Gees — "Massachusetts"
2. Bee Gees — "Idea"
3. Julie Driscoll, Brian Auger & The Trinity — "This Wheel's On Fire"
4. Bee Gees — "I Started a Joke"
5. Bee Gees — "Such a Shame"
6. Julie Driscoll, Brian Auger & The Trinity — Break It Up
7. Bee Gees — "When the Swallows Fly"
8. Bee Gees — "Indian Gin and Whisky Dry"
9. Brian Auger & The Trinity — Black Cat
10. Bee Gees — "I've Gotta Get a Message to You"
11. Julie Driscoll, Brian Auger & The Trinity — "Season of the Witch"
12. Bee Gees — "Harry Braff"
13. Lil Lindfors — "Words"
14. Julie Driscoll, Brian Auger & Julie Driscoll — "Road to Cairo"
15. Julie Driscoll, Brian Auger & The Trinity — "Shadows of You"
16. Bee Gees — "Swan Song"
17. Bee Gees — "I Have Decided to Join the Airforce"
