= I Started a Joke =

1968 single by Bee Gees

- Standard continental European artwork

Single by the Bee Gees

from the album Idea
- B-side: "Kilburn Towers"; "Swan Song" (France)
- Released: 21 December 1968
- Recorded: 20 June 1968
- Studio: IBC Studios, London
- Genre: Pop; soft rock
- Length: 3:05
- Label: Polydor (United Kingdom); Atco (United States)
- Songwriters: Barry, Robin and Maurice Gibb
- Producers: Robert Stigwood, Bee Gees

The Bee Gees singles chronology
"I've Gotta Get a Message to You" (1968)	"I Started a Joke" (1968)	"First of May" (1969)

"I Started a Joke" is a song by the Bee Gees from their 1968 album Idea, which was released as a single in December of that year in the United States. The song is the last Bee Gees single to feature Vince Melouney's guitar work, as he left the band in early December after this song was released as a single. It was not released as a single in the United Kingdom, which saw a version released by Heath Hampstead under the Polydor label.

The song's B-side was "Kilburn Towers", except in France, where "Swan Song" was used. "I Started a Joke" was written by Robin Gibb mainly, with help from Barry and Maurice on the bridge. It was produced by the Bee Gees with Robert Stigwood.

== Composition and recording ==
Songs for the Idea album were completed on 20 June. "I Started A Joke" was the last to be recorded.

According to Robin Gibb, the melancholic melody of the song was inspired by the sounds on board an aeroplane:

The melody to this one was heard aboard a British Airways Vickers Viscount about a hundred miles from Essen. It was one of those old four engine "prop" jobs, that seemed to drone the passenger into a sort of hypnotic trance, only with this it was different. The droning, after a while, appeared to take the form of a tune, which mysteriously sounded like a church choir. So it was decided! We accosted the pilot, forced him to land in the nearest village and there, in a small pub, we finished the lyrics [with Barry]. Actually, it wasn't a village, it was the city, and it wasn't a pub, it was a hotel, and we didn't force the pilot to land in a field ... but why ruin a perfectly good story?

"There was a lot of that in those days," Barry laughed, "There was a lot of psychedelia and the idea that if you wrote something, even if it sounded ridiculous, somebody would find the meaning for it, and that was the truth."

== Structure and release ==
The promotional video for "I Started a Joke" was directed by Jean-Christophe Averty. It was filmed in Brussels as part of the Idea TV Special and features floating question marks on the song while Robin sings. In the video, Maurice is shown playing a Rickenbacker 4001 and Vince Melouney playing a Gibson ES-335.

The song reached #1 in Canada, New Zealand and Australia. In Canada, it spent two weeks as the number one in RPM charts. "I Started a Joke" debuted at #66 at the United States Cashbox magazine in the week of 14 December 1968 and reached #6.

Robin Gibb's son played "I Started a Joke" on his phone just after his father died on 20 May 2012. Robin-John Gibb told The Sun:

When he passed away we went out, they took the equipment away and we came back in, I picked up my phone and found "I Started a Joke" on YouTube and played it. I put the phone on his chest and that was the first time I broke down. I knew that song and its lyrics were perfect for that moment. That song will always have new meaning to me now.

Cash Box described it as being in the Bee Gees' "softer" style, saying it was more in the style of "Words" than "Gotta Get a Message to You," and said that "paradoxical imagery offers magnetic charm to mystical interpretation."

== Personnel ==
Musicians:

- Robin Gibb – lead vocals
- Barry Gibb – acoustic rhythm guitar, backing vocals
- Maurice Gibb – mellotron, organ piano, bass guitar
- Vince Melouney – electric lead guitar, acoustic guitar intro
- Colin Petersen – drums
- Bill Shepherd – string arrangements

Technical:

- Bee Gees – producer
- Robert Stigwood – producer
- John Pantry – engineer
- Damon Lyon Shaw – engineer

== Charts ==
=== Weekly charts ===
Chart (1969)	Peak position
Australia (Kent Music Report)	1
Austria (Ö3 Austria Top 40)	16
Belgium (Ultratop 50 Flanders)	19
Belgium (Ultratop 50 Wallonia)	8
Brazil (ABPD)	1
Canada Top Singles (RPM)	1
Denmark	1
France (SNEP)	3
Indonesia (Aktuil)	3
Japan (Oricon)	28
Italy (FIMI)	19
Netherlands (Dutch Top 40)	3
Netherlands (Single Top 100)	3
New Zealand (Recorded Music NZ)	1
Norway (VG-lista)	3
South Africa (Springbok Radio)	2
Spain (PROMUSICAE)	14
Switzerland (Schweizer Hitparade)	5
US Billboard Hot 100	6
US Cash Box	6
US Record World	5

=== Year-end charts ===
Chart (1969)	Position
Canada Top Singles (RPM)	7
Switzerland (Swiss Hitparade)	10
Netherlands (Dutch Top 40)	9
US Cash Box	41

== Faith No More version ==
"I Started a Joke"
- One of artwork variants

Single by Faith No More

from the album Who Cares a Lot? The Greatest Hits
- Released: 21 September 1998
- Recorded: Early 1995
- Length: 3:03
- Label: Slash
- Songwriter: Barry, Robin & Maurice Gibb
- Producers: Billy Gould; Dean Menta

Faith No More singles chronology
"This Town Ain't Big Enough for Both of Us" (1998)	"I Started a Joke" (1998)	"Motherfucker" (2014)

Faith No More originally covered "I Started a Joke" as a B-side for their 1995 single "Digging the Grave". It also appeared on some versions of their fifth studio album King for a Day... Fool for a Lifetime but following the band's dissolution in 1998 it was released as a single with their greatest hits album Who Cares a Lot? The Greatest Hits. It was the last single the band released until their 2009 reunion. Bassist Billy Gould said they became inspired to record a cover for the song after playing a 1993 show in Guam and going to a military bar, which had the song playing, along with hardcore pornography on large televisions. Even though the cover was originally recorded in 1995, Gould still considered it to be a fitting final single, due to them being an "ironic band". He added in 1998, "we liked to mock a lot of the things we saw in the music business and we tried to have a sense of humor. And yet the joke was always on us too because we always ended up looking a bit like monkeys when we did so".

The music video was filmed on 8 September 1998, after Faith No More had disbanded five months earlier and featured none of the band members. It was directed by Vito Rocco, filmed by Nick Sawyer with make-up by Julie Nightingale and Dani Richardson with Gabi Norland as the clapper loader. British actors Martin Freeman and Shaun Dingwall both feature in the promo, along with performance artist David Hoyle as the karaoke singer, and also stars Michelle Butterly of the ITV series, Benidorm. Derren Litten, the writer of Benidorm and a contributor to The Catherine Tate Show, is also seen in the video.

=== Track listing ===
Disc one

1. "I Started a Joke" – 3:03
2. "The World Is Yours" – 5:52
3. "Midnight Cowboy" (Live) – 1:01

Disc two

1. "I Started a Joke" – 3:03
2. "This Guy's in Love with You" (Live) – 4:20
3. "We Care a Lot" (Live) – 3:55

Live tracks recorded on 21 October 1997 at the Horden Pavilion, Sydney, Australia by MTV Australia.

=== Charts ===
Chart (1998)	Peak position
Australia (ARIA)	58
New Zealand (Recorded Music NZ)	38
UK Singles (Official Charts)	49

== Other notable cover versions ==
- In 1998, Robbie Williams with The Orb released a reggae rendition of the song and it was included on the Bee Gees Tribute Album: Gotta Get a Message for You as a fundraiser for Live Challenge '99.
- In 2012, Pet Shop Boys included a cover on their Winner single.
- In June 2016, German satirist Jan Böhmermann covered the song live on his TV show Neo Magazin Royale, commenting on the Böhmermann affair.
- In June 2025, Paul Weller released his cover version of the song ahead of his forthcoming covers album, Find El Dorado.

== Parodies ==
"I Started a Joke" was parodied by a Radio Free Vestibule sketch in which a voiced-over commentary takes the lyrics completely literally, appeared on the film Zoolander as covered by The Wallflowers. The song "I Started a Joke" was featured heavily in the ending of the film Penn & Teller Get Killed, which features the two magicians playing a succession of increasingly elaborate practical jokes on each other with a fatal conclusion.
