= When the Swallows Fly =

Single by Bee Gees

from the album Idea
- B-side: "Give Your Best"
- Released: September 1968 (album) 1971 (Netherlands)
- Recorded: 18 June 1968
- Genre: Baroque pop, psychedelic pop
- Length: 2:22 (mono); 2:29 (stereo)
- Label: Polydor; Atco (United States/Canada)
- Songwriter(s): Barry, Robin & Maurice Gibb
- Producer(s): Robert Stigwood, Bee Gees

"When the Swallows Fly" is a song by the Bee Gees released on their fifth album Idea. Its promotional video was filmed in Brussels and included on the TV special Idea and was aired on 11 December 1968.

== Background ==
The song's opening line echoed William Wordsworth's poem"I Wandered Lonely as a Cloud". It was recorded on June 18th 1968 at the same session as "No Name". Robin said "It was one of my favorites, I think Barry's vocal on that is fantastic". Barry recalls: "['When the Swallows Fly'] that's something I brought in, but I don't remember how the song came about. It was probably written in Eaton Square or at the penthouse. A lot of the ballads in those days were written that way, like 'Words'.

== Chart performance ==
In 1971, when it was included on the Melody film soundtrack, it was released as a single only in Netherlands with "Give Your Best" as the B-side. It reached #20 in two weeks

== Weekly charts ==
Chart (1971)	Peak position
Netherlands Dutch Top 40	20

== Personnel ==
- Barry Gibb — lead vocals, guitar
- Maurice Gibb — bass, piano, organ, mellotron, backing vocals
- Colin Petersen — drums
- Robin Gibb — backing vocals
- Vince Melouney — acoustic guitar
