= Idea (album) =

1968 studio album by the Bee Gees

- Polydor design by Wolfgang Heilemann

Studio album by the Bee Gees
- Released: August 1968
- Recorded: January-July 1968
- Studio: IBC (London)
- Genres: Psychedelic rock; psychedelic pop; art rock; soft rock
- Length: 35:22
- Labels: Polydor; Atco (United States)
- Producers: Robert Stigwood, Bee Gees

The Bee Gees chronology
Horizontal (1968)	Idea (1968)	Odessa (1969)

Singles from Idea
- 1. "I've Gotta Get a Message to You" Released: 7 September 1968; 2. "I Started a Joke" Released: 21 December 1968

Idea is the fifth album by the Bee Gees. Released in August 1968, the album sold over a million copies worldwide. The album was issued in both mono and stereo pressings in the UK. The artwork on the Polydor release designed by Wolfgang Heilemann featured a "beehive" neon lightbulb with a group photo in its base, while the North American ATCO release designed by Klaus Voormann featured a composite head made from each band member. It was their third internationally released album – the first two albums being released only in the Australian market.

"I've Gotta Get a Message to You" and "I Started a Joke" were both released as singles in North America. In the UK, "Message" was released only as a single and "I Started a Joke" was only an album track, though another album track, "Kitty Can", was featured on the B-side of "I've Gotta Get a Message to You". The LP's opening track, "Let There Be Love", in a limited release as a single in early 1970, reached the Top 20 in the Netherlands.

The North American ATCO LP and the South African Polydor LP replaced "Such a Shame" with "I've Gotta Get a Message to You". Both songs were included when the album was released on CD in 1989.

== Background ==
Idea, released in August 1968, was the Bee Gees' third international album. "We were in friction at that point," says Barry. "We weren't getting on, and that was it. I think it was a mixture of the group not getting along very well and egos. Ego, I think, is the key word for this group. It's not unlike any other group in that everybody wants to be the one that gets the attention. Unfortunately, I think that happens a lot. Certainly it happened to us."

Many of the songs on the album's second side reflect a yearning for escape ("When the Swallows Fly," "I've Decided to Join the Air Force," "Swan Song") while Vince Melouney's "Such a Shame" was, by his own admission, about how it was a shame that the group was disintegrating.

"In the Summer of His Years" was Robin's requiem for the Beatles' manager Brian Epstein who had died in August 1967. "I've Decided to Join the Air Force" was written specially for the occasion when the Bee Gees played at the Royal Albert Hall earlier in 1968 with the musicians of the Royal Air Force backing them.

Barry Gibb performed "Kilburn Towers" on his Mythology tour of 2013-14 while "Swan Song" made a surprise appearance on the first disc of the 2010 Mythology compilation.

== Recording ==
The band recorded its previous album Horizontal between July and December 1967. The last song recorded was "Swan Song," but this was not released until 1968 on Idea. "Words" was released as a single in place of "Swan Song."

The band started recording Idea in January 1968 after a Christmas holiday in Australia, and a few weeks after the Horizontal sessions. The songs recorded were "Chocolate Symphony", "The Singer Sang His Song", "Down to Earth", "I Can Lift a Mountain", ("Gena's Theme" was finished in June,) "Jumbo" was released as a non-album single, "Bridges Crossing Rivers", and "She Is Russia". The February songs are "In the Summer of His Years" and "I've Decided to Join the Air Force". By March, Barry, Maurice, and Colin participated on the track "By the Light of the Burning Candle" by The Marbles, a newly formed band at that time made up of members Graham Bonnet and Trevor Gordon. Between June and July in 1968, they recorded "Kitty Can", "I.O.I.O.", "Let There Be Love", "Stepping Out", and "No Name". In June, Robin recorded "The Band Will Meet Mr. Justice", "The People's Public Joke", "Indian Gin and Whisky Dry", "The Girl to Share Each Day", "Come Some Halloween or Christmas Day", "My Love Life Expired", and "Heaven in My Hand", a mono tape of seven songs which was credited only to him. In the same month, they recorded "Completely Unoriginal", "Kilburn Towers", the Vince Melouney composition "Such a Shame", "Indian Gin and Whisky Dry", "When the Swallows Fly", "Idea", "Come Some Christmas Eve or Halloween", "Maypole News", "Men of Men", and "I Started a Joke".

The other songs recorded around 1968 included "Sitting in the Meadow" and "Another Cold and Windy Day," both recorded for Coca-Cola, "In the Middle of Grass," "Let Your Heart Out," and "The Square Cup". "Everything That Came From Mother Goose" was written by Colin Petersen and Maurice Gibb, and Petersen mentioned this song in an interview in September 1968. In July, "I've Gotta Get a Message to You" was recorded in the same session as "I Laugh in Your Face" (released on Odessa, 1969) following the completion of the album, but was only included on the US version.

== Release and reception ==
Professional ratings
Review scores
Source	Rating
AllMusic	3/5 stars
Rolling Stone	(neutral)
The Rolling Stone Album Guide	1.5/5 stars

This album features "Such a Shame", the only non-Gibb Bee Gees song included on any of their studio albums, written and co-sung by lead guitarist Vince Melouney. The song was included on the British version of the album but deleted from the American issue, which instead included their recent hit "I've Gotta Get a Message to You", not on the UK LP. When the album was issued on CD in the 1980s, both tracks were included. "I Started a Joke" was not issued as a single in the UK, but it reached No. 6 in America. The UK sleeve had a lightbulb on a dark blue ground. In 2006, Reprise Records reissued Idea (using the European cover) with both stereo and mono mixes on one disc and a bonus disc of unreleased songs, non-album tracks, and alternate mixes. After the release of Idea, the band went to Brussels for the TV special Idea in September, and European tour in October and November.

Jared Johnson, writing in the Atlanta Constitution, opined that Idea was 'a vast improvement' over the Bee Gees' previous LP, 'though they still haven't reached their full potential.' Mike Newsome, writing in the Lancaster Telegraph said that the album was 'packed with original Bee Gees ideas, imagination and inventiveness.' Wayne Harada in the Honolulu Star-Advertiser said that the album 'showcases the expressive Bee Gees moods and lyricism'. Of 21st century critics, Allmusic's Bruce Eder describes "I Started a Joke" as very much of piece with their early work. Eder claims "Kitty Can", "Indian Gin and Whisky Dry" and "Such a Shame" sound like the output of a working band with a cohesive group sound, rather than a harmony vocal group with accompaniment.

This was to be the last Bee Gees album released while Vince Melouney was a member of the group: he left after the late 1968 European tour. He was to conclude that "I was just too young, too naive." His final album with the band would be Odessa, which had been recorded in August that year.

== Track listing (UK) ==
All songs written by Barry, Robin and Maurice Gibb, except "Such a Shame", written and composed by Vince Melouney.

Side one
No.	Title	Lead vocal(s)	Length
1.	"Let There Be Love"	Barry and Robin	3:28
2.	"Kitty Can"	Barry and Maurice	2:31
3.	"In the Summer of His Years"	Robin	3:05
4.	"Indian Gin and Whisky Dry"	Robin	1:55
5.	"Down to Earth"	Robin	2:28
6.	"Such a Shame"	Vince	2:28

Side two
No.	Title	Lead vocal(s)	Length
1.	"Idea"	Barry and Robin	2:51
2.	"When the Swallows Fly"	Barry	2:22
3.	"I Have Decided to Join the Airforce"	Barry and Robin	2:06
4.	"I Started a Joke"	Robin	3:03
5.	"Kilburn Towers"	Barry	2:14
6.	"Swan Song"	Barry	2:55

== American release ==
Idea
- ATCO design by Klaus Voormann

Studio album by Bee Gees
- Released: August 1968
- Recorded: 13 December 1967 – 12 July 1968
- Studios: IBC Studios, London
- Genres: Psychedelic rock, psychedelic pop, baroque pop, folk pop
- Length: 32:49
- Language: English
- Label: Atco
- Producers: Robert Stigwood, Bee Gees

Bee Gees American albums chronology
Horizontal (1968)	Idea (1968)	Odessa (1969)

Singles from Idea
- 1. "I've Gotta Get a Message to You" Released: July 1968; 2. "I Started a Joke" Released: December 1968

It was released also in August on the Atco label, and was released in stereo. "I've Gotta Get a Message to You" was included on this version instead of "Such a Shame". Its cover was a composite head by Klaus Voormann, the artist who also did the Bee Gees' 1st art.

Side one
No.	Title	Lead vocal(s)	Length
1.	"Let There Be Love"	Barry and Robin	3:32
2.	"Kitty Can"	Barry and Maurice	2:38
3.	"In The Summer of His Years"	Robin	3:11
4.	"Indian Gin and Whisky Dry"	Robin	2:01
5.	"Down to Earth"	Robin	2:38
6.	"I've Gotta Get a Message to You"	Robin and Barry	2:55

Side two
No.	Title	Lead vocal(s)	Length
1.	"Idea"	Barry and Robin	2:50
2.	"When the Swallows Fly"	Barry	2:29
3.	"I Have Decided to Join the Airforce"	Barry and Robin	2:11
4.	"I Started a Joke"	Robin	3:07
5.	"Kilburn Towers"	Barry	2:17
6.	"Swan Song"	Barry	2:56

== 1989 and 2006 reissue track listings ==
=== 1989 reissue ===
All songs written by Barry, Robin and Maurice Gibb, except "Such a Shame", written and composed by Vince Melouney.

1989 reissue
No.	Title	Lead vocal(s)	Length
1.	"Let There Be Love"	Barry and Robin	3:28
2.	"Kitty Can"	Barry and Maurice	2:31
3.	"In the Summer of His Years"	Robin	3:05
4.	"Indian Gin and Whisky Dry"	Robin	1:55
5.	"Down to Earth"	Robin	2:28
6.	"Such a Shame"	Vince	2:28
7.	"I've Gotta Get a Message to You"	Robin and Barry	2:55
8.	"Idea"	Barry and Robin	2:51
9.	"When the Swallows Fly"	Barry	2:22
10.	"I Have Decided to Join the Airforce"	Barry and Robin	2:06
11.	"I Started a Joke"	Robin	3:03
12.	"Kilburn Towers"	Barry	2:14
13.	"Swan Song"	Barry	2:55

=== 2006 expanded reissue ===
2006 reissue (disc one)
No.	Title	Lead vocal(s)	Length
1.	"Let There Be Love" (Stereo mix)	Barry, Robin and Maurice	3:32
2.	"Kitty Can" (Stereo mix)	Maurice and Barry	2:38
3.	"In the Summer of His Years" (Stereo mix)	Robin	3:11
4.	"Indian Gin and Whisky Dry" (Stereo mix)	Robin	2:01
5.	"Down to Earth" (Stereo mix)	Robin	2:32
6.	"Such a Shame" (Stereo mix)	Vince Melouney	2:28
7.	"I've Gotta Get a Message to You" (Stereo mix)	Robin and Barry	2:55
8.	"Idea" (Stereo mix)	Barry, Robin and Maurice	2:50
9.	"When the Swallows Fly" (Stereo mix)	Barry	2:29
10.	"I Have Decided to Join the Air Force" (Stereo mix)	Maurice, Barry and Robin	2:11
11.	"I Started a Joke" (Stereo mix)	Robin	3:07
12.	"Kilburn Towers" (Stereo mix)	Barry	2:17
13.	"Swan Song" (Stereo mix)	Barry	2:56
14.	"Let There Be Love" (Mono mix)	Barry, Robin and Maurice	3:32
15.	"Kitty Can" (Mono mix)	Maurice and Barry	2:38
16.	"In the Summer of His Years" (Mono mix)	Robin	3:11
17.	"Indian Gin and Whisky Dry" (Mono mix)	Robin	2:01
18.	"Down to Earth" (Mono mix)	Robin	2:32
19.	"Such a Shame" (Mono mix)	Vince Melouney	2:28
20.	"I've Gotta Get a Message to You" (Mono mix)	Robin and Barry	2:55
21.	"Idea" (Mono mix)	Barry, Robin and Maurice	2:50
22.	"When the Swallows Fly" (Mono mix)	Barry	2:29
23.	"I Have Decided to Join the Air Force" (Mono mix)	Maurice, Barry and Robin	2:11
24.	"I Started a Joke" (Mono mix)	Robin	3:07
25.	"Kilburn Towers" (Mono mix)	Barry	2:17
26.	"Swan Song" (Mono mix)	Barry	2:56

2006 reissue (disc two)
No.	Title	Lead vocal(s)	Length
1.	"Chocolate Symphony"	Barry	2:42
2.	"I've Gotta Get a Message to You" (Mono single version)	Robin and Barry	3:01
3.	"Jumbo"	Barry	2:08
4.	"The Singer Sang His Song"	Robin	3:19
5.	"Bridges Crossing Rivers"	Barry, Robin and Maurice	2:07
6.	"Idea" (Alternate mix)	Barry, Robin and Maurice	2:48
7.	"Completely Unoriginal"	Robin and Barry	3:36
8.	"Kitty Can" (Alternate mix)	Barry and Maurice	2:36
9.	"Come Some Christmas Eve or Halloween"	Robin	3:30
10.	"Let There Be Love" (Alternate mix)	Barry	3:34
11.	"Gena's Theme"	Instrumental	3:19
12.	"Another Cold and Windy Day"	Robin	1:00
13.	"Sitting in the Meadow"	Robin	1:00

== Personnel ==
Credits from Bee Gees historian and sessionographer Joseph Brennan.

Bee Gees

- Barry Gibb – lead vocals, harmony and backing vocals, rhythm guitar
- Robin Gibb – lead vocals, harmony and backing vocals
- Maurice Gibb – harmony and backing vocals, bass, piano, Hammond organ, Mellotron
- Vince Melouney – lead guitar, harmonica, lead vocals on "Such a Shame"
- Colin Petersen – drums

Additional musician and production

- Bill Shepherd – orchestral arrangement
- Bee Gees – producers
- Robert Stigwood – producer
- John Pantry, Damon Lyon Shaw – engineer
- Klaus Voormann – art cover (US version)

== Charts ==
=== Weekly charts ===
Chart	Position
Australian Kent Music Report	8
Canadian RPM Albums Chart	10
Finnish Soumen Virallinen Albums Chart	6
French SNEP Albums Chart	4
UK Albums Chart	4
US Billboard 200	17
West German Media Control Albums Chart	3
