= Kilburn Towers =

Single by the Bee Gees

from the album Idea
- A-side: "I Started a Joke"
- Released: 21 December 1968
- Recorded: 14 June 1968
- Genre: Folk
- Length: 2:14 (mono); 2:17 (stereo)
- Label: Polydor (United Kingdom); Atco (United States)
- Songwriter: Barry, Robin & Maurice Gibb
- Producers: Robert Stigwood, Bee Gees

The Bee Gees flipsides singles chronology
"Kitty Can" (1968)	"Kilburn Towers" (1968)	"Lamplight" (1969)

"Kilburn Towers" is a folk song by the Bee Gees. It was written by Barry, Robin and Maurice Gibb in 1968 for the album Idea. It was also released as the B-side of "I Started a Joke" in most territories. This song's length was 2:14 in mono and 2:17 in stereo. The song was produced by the group's manager Robert Stigwood and the Bee Gees. The song was written about the Sydney ocean apartment buildings, Kilburn Towers, built in 1960.

Virginia Vee recorded "Kilburn Towers" in 1968. Her version was released as a single only in France, with another Bee Gees song, "Let There Be Love", as the B-side; it was arranged by Jimi Horowitz and produced by Claude Ebrard on Polydor Records. Vee's version was recorded also at IBC Studios in London.

== Writing and recording ==
Barry Gibb says that "Kilburn Towers" was written in his Apartment. Barry continues "I would just sit and strum on my own. I think it was just something that I sort of came up with and that was it."

It was recorded on 14 June 1968 with "Such a Shame". Barry performs vocals on this track. The breathy vocals and orchestral instrumental break are similar to "In the Summer of His Years". The flute sound throughout is performed by Maurice Gibb on Mellotron. Colin Petersen plays bongos on this track.

== Personnel ==
- Barry Gibb — lead vocals, acoustic guitar
- Robin Gibb - harmony vocals
- Maurice Gibb — mellotron, bass guitar, harmony vocals
- Colin Petersen — bongos
- Bill Shepherd — orchestral arrangement
