= The Singer Sang His Song =

Single by the Bee Gees
- A-side: "Jumbo"; (double A-side)
- Released: March 1968
- Recorded: 8 January 1968
- Genre: Baroque pop
- Length: 3:07 (Original version); 3:19 (1990 mixed version)
- Label: Polydor (United Kingdom); Atco (United States)
- Songwriter: Barry, Robin & Maurice Gibb
- Producers: Robert Stigwood, Bee Gees

The Bee Gees singles chronology
"Sinking Ships" (1968)	"The Singer Sang His Song" (1968)	"Kitty Can" (1968)

"The Singer Sang His Song" is a song by the Bee Gees, written by Barry and Robin and released in early 1968 as a single along with Jumbo. In some countries the song was the B-side of Jumbo but in others they were promoted as a double A-side.

== Recording and mixing ==
This track was only issued as a single and not included on a studio album at the time, so by standard practice at the time, it was not mixed to stereo. The song was recorded on 8 January 1968, the same day the song "Down to Earth" was recorded, which was included on their third international album Idea and "Chocolate Symphony", now included on the expanded version of Idea released in 2007.

The song was unavailable until 1990 when it was mixed in stereo for the first time and extended to 3:19 for inclusion on the Tales from the Brothers Gibb boxset. A remastered version featured on the deluxe edition of Idea released in 2006. Its promotional video was filmed in black and white, which featured a man and woman running in a park, interspersed with The Bee Gees performing on stage. It reached No. 25 in the UK.

== Release ==
Maurice Gibb explained about this song:

The only time Robert was wrong when he said to release "Jumbo" as the A-side instead of the flipside "The Singer Sang His Song." We thought that was going to be the A-side, but Atlantic convinced Robert, and Robert had been convinced by Vince and Colin 'cause they liked playing a bit more bluesy stuff, Robert said 'never again will I let anybody talk me into anything'.

The band's manager Robert Stigwood also explained about this song:

I also now realise it was a mistake to release it [Jumbo] as an A-side in Britain because the public still want big, emotional ballads from the boys.

In a Billboard magazine interview with the Bee Gees, Maurice said of the song, "I love 'The Singer Sang His Song' from way back [in 1968]. But the songs are like our kids, and you feel funny favoring one to the other".

== Personnel ==
- Robin Gibb — lead vocals, organ
- Barry Gibb — backing and harmony vocals, guitar
- Maurice Gibb — backing vocals, bass, piano, organ, mellotron
- Vince Melouney — acoustic guitar
- Colin Petersen — drums
- Bill Shepherd – orchestral arrangement

== Charts ==
=== Weekly charts ===
Chart (1968)	Peak position
Canada (RPM)	23
Netherlands (Dutch Top 40)	2
Switzerland (Swiss Hitparade)	4
UK Singles (Official Charts Company)	25
US Billboard Hot 100	116

=== Year-end charts ===
Chart (1968)	Position
Switzerland (Swiss Hitparade)	8
