= Jumbo (Bee Gees song) =

Single by the Bee Gees
- A-side: "The Singer Sang His Song" (double A-side)
- Released: March 1968
- Recorded: 10 January 1968
- Genre: Blues rock; psychedelic rock
- Length: 2:07
- Label: Polydor (United Kingdom); Atco (United States)
- Songwriters: Barry Gibb; Robin Gibb; Maurice Gibb
- Producers: Robert Stigwood; Bee Gees

The Bee Gees singles chronology
"Words" (1968)	"Jumbo" (1968)	"I've Gotta Get a Message to You" (1968)

Audio sample
- "Jumbo": file; help

Licensed audio
- "Jumbo" on YouTube

"Jumbo" is a song released by the Bee Gees, written by Barry, Robin and Maurice Gibb. It was released as a double A side with "The Singer Sang His Song" but featured as the lead track in some territories.

== Origin ==
"Jumbo" was recorded on January 10 during sessions for the album Idea (though it was not included on the album) on the same day as "Gena's Theme" and "Bridges Crossing Rivers" (neither of which saw release until the remastered edition of Idea in 2006). The song has a strong emphasis on guitar with two tracks laid down by Vince Melouney

== Release ==
The decision on which song would be the A-side came so late that many British singles have "The Singer Sang His Song" marked as the A-side, but "Jumbo" was promoted as the A-side instead. This single broke the series of major Bee Gees hits, and fell into obscurity as neither side was on the next album nor was "Jumbo" on Best of Bee Gees in 1969. The two songs only resurfaced on unofficial compilations and boxed sets. The song reached #25 in the British charts and #57 in the American charts and Barry said:

We've been attacked for apparently never changing our style. Well, remember that we write all our own material. We try for unusual song lyrics, but obviously we have a bias towards one particular style of song. Our single was going to be "The Singer Sang His Song" as the A-side, but we heeded the criticism. We switched to "Jumbo", which is a distinct change of direction for us. A simple sort of idea, every kid has an imaginary pet animal, but scored differently. As it happened, a lot of people thought we were wrong to change and said they preferred "Singer" even if it was on the same lines as earlier ones, But when we study other groups, we know the dangers of staying on one direction.

Following a string of transatlantic Top 20 singles, "Jumbo" was the first single to miss that mark in both Britain and America (though "To Love Somebody" had missed the UK Top 40). "Jumbo" managed to reach number 25 in the UK but stalled at number 57 in America, breaking a streak of five consecutive Top 20 singles there. Until the release of the box set Tales from the Brothers Gibb, "Jumbo" was available only on vinyl. In other versions "The Singer Sang His Song" was the A-side and the B-side was this single.

This song, along with "The Singer Sang His Song", was only released on a single in 1968, so it was mixed only to mono at that time. It wasn't until 1990 that a stereo version was prepared by Bill Inglot for the release of the Tales from the Brothers Gibb box set. Bee Gees manager Robert Stigwood said "As far as record sales go, "Jumbo" was aimed at the American market."

The band's guitarist Vince Melouney explained "Jumbo" and "The Singer Sang His Song":

It was always Stigwood's call. The only exception was "Jumbo" where we pushed for that. Robert wanted the other side as the A-side. When that started to go wrong, he quickly tried to make "Singer Sang" as the A-side.

The single was released in March 1968 elsewhere. In Germany, it was released in April 1968. Its relative failure was quickly forgotten when the next single "I've Gotta Get a Message to You" became an international hit.

Cash Box said that "changing tempos and powerful instrumental thrust" gave the song "extra punch". Record World called it a "children's song with appeal for all ages."

== Personnel ==
- Barry Gibb – lead vocals, acoustic guitar
- Maurice Gibb – bass, organ, mellotron
- Vince Melouney – electric guitar
- Colin Petersen – drums

== Charts ==
=== Weekly charts ===
Chart (1968)	Peak position
Australia (Kent Music Report)	20
Austria (Ö3 Austria Top 40)	9
Belgium (Ultratop 50)	18
Canada (RPM)	16
Denmark	10
France (SNEP)	25
Germany (Media Control Charts)	5
Netherlands (Dutch Top 40)	2
Switzerland	4
UK Singles (Official Charts Company)	25
US Billboard Hot 100	57
US Cash Box	40
US Record World	39

=== Year-end charts ===
Chart (1968)	Position
Austria (Ö3 Austria Top 40)	9
Belgium (Ultratop 50)	18
Netherlands (Dutch Top 40)	14
