= Sinking Ships (song) =

Single by the Bee Gees
- A-side: "Words"
- Released: January 1968
- Recorded: 7 November 1967
- Genre: Psychedelic pop
- Length: 2:21
- Label: Polydor (United Kingdom); Atco (United States)
- Songwriter: Barry, Robin & Maurice Gibb
- Producers: Robert Stigwood, Bee Gees

Bee Gees flipsides singles chronology
"Sir Geoffrey Saved the World" (1968)	"Sinking Ships" (1968)	"The Singer Sang His Song" (1968)

"Sinking Ships" is a single by the Bee Gees, released as the B-side of "Words" in January 1968. It was written by Barry, Robin and Maurice Gibb and produced by Robert Stigwood and the Bee Gees. The song was unusual for the group in that it featured solo vocal lines from all three Gibb brothers. It was reissued in Germany in 1987. Both tracks were released as a double A in Germany, Netherlands, Japan and France.

The song's structure is a similar to that of "Horizontal", with three verses and a false fade at the end of the verse two.

== Track listing ==
All songs written and composed by Barry, Robin & Maurice Gibb.

No.	Title	Length
1.	"Words"	3:13
2.	"Sinking Ships"	2:21

== Personnel ==
- Barry Gibb — lead vocals, guitar
- Robin Gibb — lead vocals, organ
- Maurice Gibb — lead vocals, bass, piano, Mellotron
- Colin Petersen — drums
- Vince Melouney — lead guitar
- Bill Shepherd — orchestral arrangement
