= Myponga Pop Festival =

1971 music festival in South Australia

Myponga'71 Pop Festival
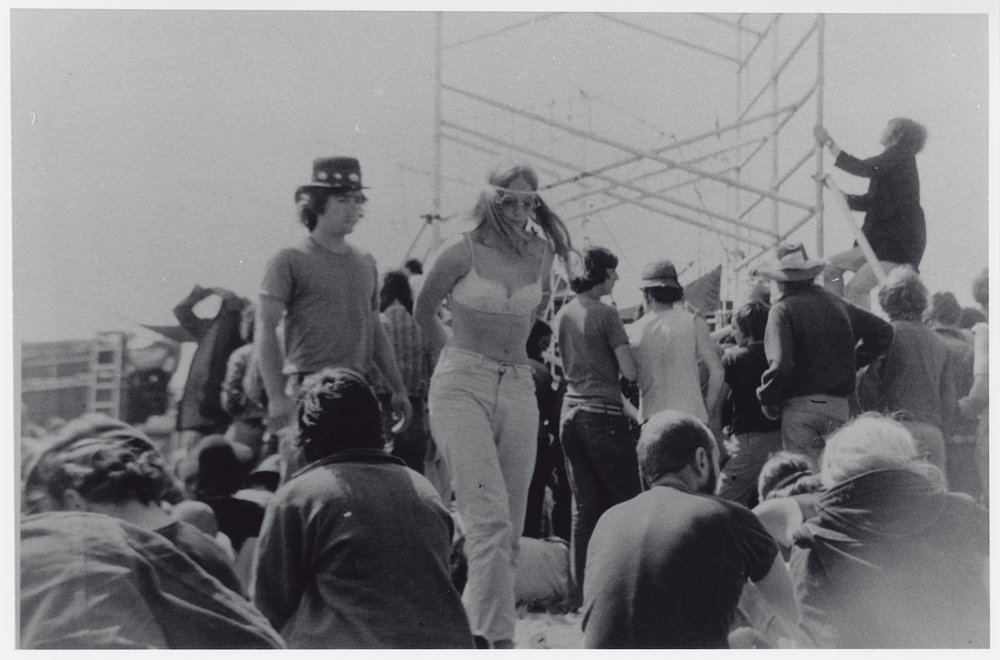
- Some of the crowd at the Myponga Pop Festival
- Genre: Rock; pop; blues
- Dates: 30 January 1971–1 February 1971
- Locations: Myponga, South Australia, Australia
- Years active: 1
- Founders: Hamish Henry
- Attendance: 15,000
- Website: https://www.myponga71.com https://www.facebook.com/mypongamusicfestival

The Myponga Pop Festival was The Australian Festival of Progressive Music which took place on a farm near Myponga, South Australia from 30 January to 1 February 1971. Myponga Pop Festival drew approximately 15,000 people, the biggest event in Adelaide since the Beatles drew a 300,000 strong crowd in 1964. Hamish Henry had brought rock band Fraternity to Adelaide, South Australia and soon had them headline his Woodstock inspired festival alongside Black Sabbath.

According to Myponga: South Australia's first pop festival by Lindsay Buckland, the festival was originally to be held at Silver Lake near Mylor, South Australia. The owner of the Silver Lake site threatened court proceedings against Music Power for changing the site of the event to Myponga. As a result Alex Innocenti pulled out from the festival as an investor and organiser and was contracted to the festival for various remedial duties, not in an official decision making capacity.

Trevor Brine was the festival's booker and artist liaison. The festival was headlined by heavy metal pioneers, Black Sabbath. Cat Stevens was advertised as co-headline artist at the festival but he cancelled to perform in Los Angeles. The compere was Adrian Rawlins, who wrote of his experiences at Myponga, and other festivals, in his book Festivals in Australia: an Intimate History (1982). Another international act was Syrius, (from Hungary, see Jackie Orszaczky).

According to Brine's assistant and ticket seller Alex Innocenti, "we went down to the farm at Myponga in Hamish's great American sports car with no roof, like movie stars. The farmer says, `What do you guys want?' and Hamish says, `I want to buy your farm.' He gave him a $1 deposit and paid him the next week." Innocenti says he has no idea what's happened to Henry.

Australian artists included Daddy Cool, Spectrum, Fraternity, Billy Thorpe and the Aztecs, Fanny Adams, Jeff St John's Copperwine with Wendy Saddington, Company Caine and Chain; South Australian artists included Steve Foster.

The Canberra Times' correspondent reported that the "festival rocked to a close tonight after taking 1 1/2 days to warm up. The pop crowd, estimated at 8,000, started arriving at the 62-acre farm at Myponga early on Saturday morning. Most of them had brought plenty of alcohol and, although violence did not erupt, the atmosphere at the festival was tense at times." The promoters did not make any profit.

Author Clinton Walker in his book 'Highway to Hell: The life and death of Bon Scott' described the Myponga Festival: "With a bill boasting an exclusive appearance by Black Sabbath as well as the cream of Australia's progressive bands, Myponga - bankrolled by Hamish Henry was the biggest thing to hit Adelaide since the Beatles..."

In March 2013 Black Sabbath's Ozzy Osbourne recalled the group's debut Australian performance, "That was the Myponga Pop Festival if I remember right? Management told us we'd have an exact copy of our amplifiers there, which we thought was great, but when we got there they were nothing like our amplifiers! But you know what? You get up there and do your best and I had a good time. I remember we had a big party at the hotel and some chicks there got absolutely shit-faced and were throwing up everywhere and we had to send them home. I don't remember much on the sex front after that..."

To commemorate the 50th Anniversary of the festival a monument was erected near the original festival site on Higgs Road, Myponga. A concert was held to celebrate the 50th Anniversary of Myponga Music Festival and Fraternity at Thebarton Theatre on Thursday 18 March 2021. Original Myponga Music Festival bands Chain, Spectrum & Fraternity performed. Doug Parkinson (Fanny Adams) was also scheduled but died just days before the event.

== Lineup ==
(Bands are listed in the order they appeared.)

=== Saturday, January 30th ===
- Uncle Jack
- Storyville
- Monshine Jug and the String Band
- Lipp Arthur
- Daddy Cool
- Desiderata
- Spectrum
- Fanny Adams
- Lipp Caine Rock Orchestra
- Geoff Crozier's Magic Freaks
- Syrius

=== Sunday, January 31st ===
- Coney Island Jug Band
- Daddy Cool
- Hippo
- Sunshine
- Company Caine
- John Graham
- Sons of the Vegetal Mother
- Margret RoadKnight
- War Machine
- Black Fire
- Fraternity
- Spectrum

=== Monday, February 1st ===
- Fat Angel
- Octopus
- Flying Biplane
- Pigface
- Lotus
- Chain
- Jeff St. John, Wendy Saddington, and the Copperwine
- Healing Force
- Billy Thorpe and the Aztecs
- Black Sabbath

== See also ==
- List of historic rock festivals
- List of jam band music festivals
