= Stephen Foster (disambiguation) =

Stephen Foster (1826–1864), known as "the father of American music", was an American songwriter.

Stephen Foster may also refer to:

- Stephen Foster (Lord Mayor of London) (fl. 1454), fishmonger and Lord Mayor of London
- Stephen Clark Foster (Maine politician) (1799–1872), United States Representative from Maine
- Stephen Symonds Foster (1809–1881), American abolitionist and social activist
- Stephen Clark Foster (1822–1898), mayor of Los Angeles
- C. Stephen Foster (fl. 1965), American ophthalmologist
- Steve Foster (singer) (1946–2018), Australian singer-songwriter
- Stephen Foster (cricketer) (born 1968), English cricketer
- Stephen Foster (footballer) (born 1980), English footballer
- Stephen Foster (boxer) (born 1980), English boxer of the 2000s and 2010s
- Stephen Foster (triathlete) (born 1966), Australian professional triathlete; see ITU World Triathlon Series

== Other uses ==
- Stephen Foster (album), a 1946 album of songs written by Foster and sung by Crosby
- Stephen Foster (sculpture), a 1900 public statue in Pittsburgh
- Stephen Foster - The Musical

== See also ==
- Stephen Foster Briggs (1885–1976), American engineer
- Stephen Foster Folk Culture Center State Park, Florida
- Stephen Foster Handicap, an American horse race
- Stephen Foster House or S. A. Foster House and Stable, Chicago, Illinois
- Stephen Foster House (Topsfield, Massachusetts)
- Stephen Foster Memorial, a historical landmark in Pittsburgh
- Stephen C. Foster State Park, a park in the Okefenokee Swamp, Georgia
- Steve Foster (disambiguation)
