= I Laugh in Your Face =

Song by Bee Gees

from the album Odessa
- Released: March 1969
- Recorded: 12 July 1968; IBC Studios, London
- Genre: Baroque pop
- Length: 4:09
- Label: Polydor Records (United Kingdom); Atco Records (United States)
- Songwriter(s): Barry, Robin & Maurice Gibb
- Producer(s): Robert Stigwood, Bee Gees

"I Laugh in Your Face" is a ballad performed by the Bee Gees, written by Barry, Robin & Maurice Gibb and released in March 1969 on the album Odessa. Most of the vocals are performed by Barry Gibb except for a short central section sung by Robin Gibb. It was recorded on July 12, 1968. the same day as the band recorded their hit song "I've Gotta Get a Message to You". The mono mix made at this time, when it was presumably intended as the B-side of "Message", was released in 2009 on the Sketches for Odessa disc that accompanied the remastered edition of the album. Its demo version, recorded the same day, also featured on the Sketches disc.

== Personnel ==
- Barry Gibb — lead and harmony vocal, guitar
- Robin Gibb — lead and harmony vocal
- Maurice Gibb — bass, piano, guitar, harmony vocal
- Colin Petersen — drums
- Bill Shepherd — orchestral arrangement
