= Steve Foster (disambiguation) =

Steve Foster (born 1957) is an English international football player.

Steve Foster may also refer to:

- Steve Foster (baseball) (born 1966), American baseball relief pitcher
- Steve Foster (boxer) (born 1960), English boxer
- Steve Foster (footballer) (born 1974) English footballer and assistant manager at Whitley Bay
- Steve Foster (singer) (1946–2018), Australian singer/songwriter and musician
- Steven D. Foster, American politician
- Steven E. Foster, United States Air National Guard general

== See also ==
- Stephen Foster (disambiguation)
