= I've Gotta Get a Message to You =

1968 single by the Bee Gees

Single by the Bee Gees

from the album Idea
- B-side: "Kitty Can"
- Released: August 1968
- Recorded: 12 July 1968
- Genre: Soft rock; pop
- Length: 2:59; 3:01 (single mix)
- Label: Polydor 56 273; Atco (United States, Canada)
- Songwriters: Barry, Robin, & Maurice Gibb
- Producers: Robert Stigwood, Bee Gees

The Bee Gees singles chronology
"Jumbo" (1968)	"I've Gotta Get a Message to You" (1968)	"I Started a Joke" (1968)

Audio sample
- "I've Gotta Get A Message To You": file; help

"I've Gotta Get a Message to You" is a song by the Bee Gees. Released as a single in 1968, it was their second number-one hit in the UK Singles Chart, and their first US Top 10 hit. Barry Gibb re-recorded the song with Keith Urban for his 2021 album Greenfields.

== Writing and recording ==
The song is about a man who, awaiting his execution in the electric chair, begs the prison chaplain to pass a final message on to his wife. Robin Gibb, who wrote the lyrics, said that the man's crime was the murder of his wife's lover, though the lyrics do not explicitly allude to the identity of the victim. Robin said, "This is about a prisoner on Death Row who only has a few hours to live. He wants the prison chaplain to pass on a final message to his wife. There's a certain urgency about it. Myself and Barry wrote it. It's a bit like writing a script. Sometimes you can sit there for three hours with your guitar and nothing will happen. Then in the last ten minutes something will spark." The song was written with Percy Sledge in mind to record it. Sledge did record it in February 1970, but Atlantic did not issue his version in the United States at the time.

Barry recalled, "In those days, the lyrics were almost pretty well done on the spot. I don't remember the fundamentals on how the lyrics were formed, except that we were writing about a guy on death row. That was it."

Robin adds:

"It was like acting, you see, we said, let's pretend that somebody, his life is on the line, somebody's going to the chair. What would be going through their mind? Let's not make it doom and gloom, but sort of an appeal to the person he loves. Because right now that's all he cares about. Regardless of whether he's done a bad thing, he is a human being, and he's sending out this last message. There's someone out there whom he loves. It's a torch song, but within a very sort of theatrical sense. Not sort of abstract, but definitely somebody in a very bad situation whose life is going to end. What would they be saying, you know? This is it: 'Gotta get a message to you, hold on".

"I've Gotta Get a Message to You" was recorded with "I Laugh in Your Face" (released on Odessa in 1969) on 12 July 1968. This track was not recorded during the Idea sessions, which had concluded on 25 June 1968 with the recording of "I Started a Joke". As Barry explained, "Now that was a memorable night. The song we wrote together, all three of us. I think that night, I know for a fact, we didn't sing the choruses in harmony. Robert called us back to the studio at 11 o'clock at night and said, 'I want the choruses in harmony, I don't want them in just melody. I want three-part harmony choruses.' So we went in and attempted that 'round about midnight. Everyone drove back to the studio, and that's what we did." The song features bass guitar lines by Maurice Gibb as Barry explained, "He had a lot of intensity in his bass, Mo was a real McCartney bass freak, as a lot of us were. He would pick up on all the things that McCartney would [do]. Maurice was very good on different instruments, you know. Good lead guitarist, good bass player, good keyboard player. He was versatile. He loved playing bass more than anything else, I think, at that time."

== Release ==
The song was the group's second UK number one single, also went to number one in Ireland and reached number eight in the US, their first top-ten hit in the Billboard Hot 100. In the UK, the song was released as a single only. The song appeared on the US edition of the Bee Gees' third album Idea, but not in the UK, where the Vince Melouney track "Such a Shame" appeared instead. Both songs appeared on CD editions of the album. The song was sent to Atlantic Records with "I Laugh in Your Face", so it would be reasonable to assume that the latter was the intended B-side. However, it was dropped in favour of "Kitty Can".

Cash Box called it "one of the most powerful outings from the Bee Gees in a while", with a "phenomenal arrangement" and "brilliant performance". Record World described it as "a plaintive song about a condemned prisoner's last hour."

=== Versions ===
"I've Gotta Get a Message to You" has appeared in five versions, all made from the same recording, but heard at three different speeds, faded out at three different points, and with different elements mixed forward. As to the speed, Bill Inglot said in 1999 that the mix he made for the Tales from the Brothers Gibb box in 1990 is at the correct reel tape speed. This speed is intermediate between the mono and stereo mixes released in 1968. The correct speed can be achieved by playing the mono single mix at 98.8%, and the LP stereo mix at 103.0%, which brings them to the correct timing.

The first mix to appear was the mono mix for the single, followed closely by a stereo mix that appeared on North American copies of the Idea album. The two sound very different. For most of the song the album mix has percussion effects and string overdubs not heard (or barely heard) in the single mix. In the ending, most of the second chorus (2:28-2:37 at the correct speed) has lead vocal in the album mix, but wordless backing vocal in the single mix, until, at 'hold on', they resume the same vocal tracks. The slower album mix is shorter because it fades out much sooner, 4 seconds sooner at the speed given, or 11 seconds sooner at corrected speed. At 2:45 (correct speed) fans hear a spoken 'save your voice' in the stereo album mix, and also less distinctly in the Tales from the Brothers Gibb mix.

During preparation of The Studio Albums 1967–1968 box set, another mix from 1968 was discovered, a mono mix that sounds like the 1968 stereo mix. Since the North American Idea LP was released only in stereo, this companion mono mix was never released.

The Tales from the Brothers Gibb mix can also be found on Rhino's 1991 The British Invasion, Volume 9 compilation.

An Italian version of the song, called Pensiero d'amore (Thought of Love), was published by Welsh singer Mal in 1969.

== Personnel ==
- Robin Gibb – lead vocals (first and third verse) and backing vocals
- Barry Gibb – lead vocals (second verse) and backing vocals, rhythm guitar
- Maurice Gibb – bass guitar, piano, Mellotron, backing vocals
- Vince Melouney – lead guitar
- Colin Petersen – drums

== Charts ==
=== Weekly charts ===
Chart (1968)	Peak position
Australia (Kent Music Report)	3
Austria (Ö3 Austria Top 40)	12
Belgium (Ultratop 50)	6
Canada Top Singles (RPM)	3
Denmark	5
Finland (Soumen Virallinen)	16
France (SNEP)	21
Germany (Media Control Charts)	3
Ireland (IRMA)	1
Italy (FIMI)	1
Netherlands (Dutch Top 40)	2
New Zealand (Recorded Music NZ)	2
Norway (VG-lista)	6
South Africa (Springbok Radio)	1
Switzerland (Swiss Hitparade)	6
UK Singles (Official Charts Company)	1
US Billboard Hot 100	8
US Cash Box	3
US Record World	7

=== Year-end charts ===
Chart (1968)	Position
Austria (Ö3 Austria Top 40)	15
Belgium (Ultratop 50)	12
Canada (RPM)	7
Netherlands (Dutch Top 40)	15
Norway (VG-lista)	9
South Africa	8
Switzerland (Swiss Hitparade)	6
US Cash Box	16
US Billboard Hot 100	59

== The Soldiers version ==
"I've Gotta Get a Message to You"

Single by the Soldiers

from the album Message to You
- Released: 23 October 2011
- Recorded: 2011
- Length: 3:19
- Label: Demon Music Group
- Songwriter: Barry, Robin & Maurice Gibb
- Producers: Nick Patrick; RJ Gibb (Robin Gibb vocal session)

The Soldiers singles chronology
"Letters Home" (2010)	"I've Gotta Get a Message to You" (2011)

In 2011, The Soldiers recorded the song with Robin Gibb for the Royal British Legion's annual charity single. It was released on 23 October 2011 in the United Kingdom on iTunes. This song reached number 75 on the UK Singles Chart. A music video to accompany the release of "I've Gotta Get A Message To You" was first released onto YouTube on 13 October 2011.

=== Track listing ===
CD/Digital download

1. "I've Gotta Get a Message to You" – 3:19
2. "I've Gotta Get a Message to You" (Full Instrumental Version) – 3:17

=== Chart performance ===
Chart (2011)	Peak position
UK Indie (Official Charts)	10
UK Singles (The Official Charts Company)	75
