= Let There Be Love (Bee Gees song) =

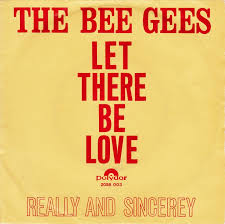
- The Dutch release of the single.

Single by Bee Gees

from the album Idea
- B-side: "Really and Sincerely" (Netherlands)
- Released: September 1968 (album); 1970 (Netherlands)
- Recorded: 12 June or 21 June 1968
- Studio: IBC Studios, London
- Genre: Baroque pop
- Length: 3:28 (mono); 3:32 (stereo)
- Label: Polydor (United Kingdom); Atco (United States)
- Songwriter: Barry, Robin & Maurice Gibb
- Producers: Robert Stigwood, Bee Gees

"Let There Be Love" is a dramatic ballad by the Bee Gees, written by Barry, Robin and Maurice Gibb and released as the opening track on their 1968 album Idea. In 1970, it was issued as a single in the Netherlands, peaking at no. 14 in March during a four-week chart run. In 1968, the group performed (lip-synced) the song on a European TV station, and the clip has been played on 192TV in the Netherlands.

"Let There Be Love" features on the 1973 compilation Best of Bee Gees Vol. 2.

== Background ==
Barry Gibb recalls:

"'Let There Be Love'" was written next to St. Paul's Cathedral in a penthouse apartment that we rented when we first arrived in England. That song was written in that penthouse 'round about midnight. Me and my then-girlfriend, who is my wife now, we'd just fallen in love, and it was that type of mood I was in that night."

The 2006 deluxe remaster has a mono mix of an earlier state of the recording, with different lead vocal sung entirely by Barry and some instrumental differences and fading at 3:34.

== Personnel ==
- Barry Gibb — vocals, guitar
- Robin Gibb — vocals
- Maurice Gibb — bass, piano, organ, mellotron, harmony vocals
- Colin Petersen — drums
- Bill Shepherd — orchestral arrangement

== Cover versions ==
- P.P. Arnold recorded this song on 9 June 1969 same day as "Bury Me Down By the River", another track by the Bee Gees. The session was produced by Barry Gibb.
- Tom Jones covered the song and released it as the closing track on the album Tom in 1970. It was arranged by Johnnie Spence, engineered by Bill Price and produced by Peter Sullivan.
