= The Life Organisation =

1970s Australian jazz ensemble

- Origin: Australia
- Genre: jazz ensemble
- Years active: 1973–1974
- Label: Polydor
- Past members: Doug Parkinson, Graham Morgan, Teddy Toi, Warren Ford, Peter Martin, Bill Motzing

The Life Organisation were a short lived Australian jazz ensemble in the early 1970s. The group had two singles peak within the Australian top 100.

== Discography ==
=== Singles ===
List of singles, with Australian chart positions
Year	Title	Peak chart positions
Year	Title	AUS
1973	"In The Mood"	76
1973	"Boogie Woogie"/"Little Brown Jug"	-
1974	"American Patrol"/"Opus No. 1"	-
1974	"Pink Steamroller"/"Boodilidoo"	-
1974	"Time Warp"/"The Sweet Song"	-
1974	"Beyond the Blue Horizon"/"In the Mood"	87
