= Fanny Adams (band) =

Early 1970s Australian supergroup

- Origin: London, England
- Genres: Hard rock, blues rock
- Years active: 1970–1971
- Label: MCA
- Past members: Johnny Dick; Vince Melouney; Doug Parkinson; Teddy Toi

Fanny Adams was a briefly existing hard rock super group formed by ex-pat Australians and New Zealanders in mid-1970. The quartet comprised Johnny Dick on drums (ex-Max Merritt and the Meteors, Billy Thorpe and the Aztecs, Doug Parkinson in Focus), Vince Melouney on guitar (ex-Billy Thorpe and the Aztecs, Vince Maloney Sect, Bee Gees), Doug Parkinson on lead vocals and rhythm guitar (ex-Questions, In Focus) and Teddy Toi on bass guitar (ex-Max Merritt and the Meteors, Billy Thorpe and the Aztecs, Little Sammy and the In People). They relocated to Australia in December and broke up there after a few months. Their debut eponymous album appeared in June 1971, which Australian musicologist, Ian McFarlane, described as "adventurous, heavy, progressive blues-rock... Melouney's crunching, multi-layered Jimmy Page-styled guitar riffs kept the whole thing together."

== History ==
Fanny Adams' founder, Vince Melouney had left the Bee Gees in 1968 when in London, after three-and-a-half years as their guitarist. He secured a solo album deal with MCA Records in mid-1970 and wished to form a group to play material similar to Led Zeppelin. He contacted his former Aztec bandmate, Toi: the ex-pat New Zealander was in London doing session work. Then he asked Dick and Parkinson to relocate from Melbourne; both had been members of Doug Parkinson in Focus, which had won the Hoadley's Battle of the Sounds in 1969. Fanny Adams recorded material for their eponymous debut album. It was produced by Melouney with all the tracks co-written by the quartet.

The group relocated to Australia in December 1970. Upon arrival Parkinson told national pop music newspaper, Go-Set, that "[we] will be the best band that ever trod this earth." They performed at the Wallacia and Myponga Pop Festivals in January. They issued Fanny Adams in June that year on MCA Records. Australian musicologist, Ian McFarlane, felt they had "cut an album of adventurous, heavy, progressive blues-rock. There were a couple of ponderous, over-long tracks (like the 10-minute 'In a Room'), but Melouney's crunching, multi-layered Jimmy Page-styled guitar riffs kept the whole thing together." David Nichols opined that they "played heavy, bluesy, progressive rock, and its members were instantly filled with a sense of their own perfection." The album had provided a single, "Got to Get a Message to You", earlier in that year.

However Fanny Adams had disbanded ahead of the album due to "ill-advised boasts of their imminent success... internal dissent and high audience expectations". It had also followed a fire at a Sydney discotheque, Caesar's Palace, which destroyed the band's equipment. According to McFarlane, "The story of Fanny Adams encapsulates one of the great disasters of Australian rock music. What sounded like a brilliant idea in theory turned out to be an ill-fated and short-lived affair for all concerned." Parkinson left to form another line-up of In Focus in February 1971. Parkinson is cited by Nichols regarding Fanny Adams: "we got into the studio and the truth came out. In my opinion [Melouney] just couldn't play. Personal hang-ups... It was all done for [Melouney]'s production company... There was no musical freedom. Bad vibes all the way along." Melouney disputed Parkinson's assertions about his playing but felt the album was "really shithouse".

Melouney was a member of a succession of groups during the 1970s: the Cleves, Rockwell T James and the Rhythm Aces, and John Paul Young's Allstars. In July 1971 both Dick and Toi worked for Lobby Loyde and all three were members of a reformed Wild Cherries. In March 2023 Gil Mathews of Aztec Music issued an eleven-track remastered version of Fanny Adams (with four bonus tracks) on CD. By that time all the band's members, except Melouney, had died.

== Members ==
- Johnny Dick – drums, percussion (1970–71, died 2017)
- Vince Melouney – lead guitar, vocals (1970–71)
- Doug Parkinson – lead vocals, rhythm guitar (1970–71, died 2021)
- Teddy Toi – bass guitar (1970–71)

== Discography ==
=== Studio albums ===
Title	Album details
Fanny Adams	Released: June 1971; Format: LP; Label: MCA Records (MAP/S 4069)

=== Singles ===
Year	Title	Albums
"Got to Get a Message to You"	1971	Fanny Adams
