= Doug Parkinson =

Australian singer (1946–2021)

- Performing "Sun Ain't Gonna Shine Any More" on Countdown, July 1981

Background information
- Born: Douglas John Parkinson; 30 October 1946; Waratah, New South Wales, Australia
- Origin: Sydney, New South Wales, Australia
- Died: 15 March 2021 (aged 74) Northern Beaches, New South Wales, Australia
- Genres: Pop; rock; R&B; folk; jazz
- Occupations: Singer; actor; entertainer
- Instruments: Vocals; guitar
- Years active: 1965–2021
- Labels: Polydor; CBS; Hammard; Raven
- Website: dougparkinson.com

Douglas John Parkinson (30 October 1946 – 15 March 2021) was an Australian pop and rock singer. He led the bands Strings and Things/A Sound (1965), the Questions (1966–1968), Doug Parkinson in Focus (1968–1970, 1971), Fanny Adams (1970–1971), the Life Organisation (1973), Southern Star Band (1978–1980) and Doug Parkinson Band (1981–1983). Doug Parkinson in Focus's cover version of the Beatles' track "Dear Prudence" (May 1969) peaked at No. 5 on the Go-Set National Top 40. The follow-up single, "Without You" / "Hair" (October), also reached No. 5. Parkinson released solo material and performed in musical theatre productions.

Two studio albums associated with Parkinson: I'll Be Around (March 1979) by Southern Star Band and Heartbeat to Heartbeat (March 1983) by Doug Parkinson Band, reached the National Top 60. Australian musicologist Ian McFarlane wrote that Parkinson, "conveyed considerable charisma with his imposing presence, 'Lucifer' beard and gruff, raspy voice. He also surrounded himself with mature, seasoned musicians who added to his appeal."

== Life and career ==
=== 1946–1964: Early life ===
Douglas John Parkinson was born in Waratah, New South Wales, a suburb of Newcastle. His German-descended father was a commercial artist in print advertising, while his mother was of Welsh-Irish heritage. The family relocated to Northern Beaches suburb of Sydney. His parents loved musical theatre and bought him a guitar when he was 12. He recalled how "my father one day made the huge mistake of buying a two-track reel-to-reel tape recorder. I have no idea why he bought it but it was there, and one night I snuck out and turned it on and sang into it. And I thought 'Who is that person coming back on that tape?'. It intrigued me. Then I asked for a guitar for Christmas and that was the end of me."

Parkinson attended Narrabeen Boys' High School, showing aptitude in literature, and was selected as a prefect, matriculating in 1963. He sang a surf rock song, for his first performance, at a school dance. As a sporting teen, he played district cricket and was a keen footballer. Parkinson also took up surfing but was hit by a surfboard, knocked unconscious and almost drowned. He was dragged from the water, resuscitated by fellow surfers, and then taken to Mona Vale Hospital. After being bedridden for six months, he recovered from his injuries. He worked briefly as a labourer before starting a journalism cadetship with Sydney morning newspaper The Daily Telegraph in 1964. In that year he interviewed George Harrison, during the Beatles tour of Australia, for his first front-page story.

=== 1965–1967: Early groups ===
In 1965, Parkinson, on lead vocals, formed Strings and Things, with Helen Barnes on bass guitar, her brother Sid Barnes junior on drums and David Lee on guitar – and changed their name to the 'A' Sound – as a folk music group. The Barnes siblings were children of Australian test cricketer Sid Barnes Sr. The 'A' Sound released "Talk About That" (1966) via Festival Records, which Australian musicologist, Ian McFarlane, described as a "pleasant folk single (in the Seekers vein)." Parkinson quit his cadetship in that year as "I was impatient, I was earning more with the band two nights a week than I was at the paper, but I was always having to swap shifts with other cadets and then I finally bit the bullet and left." The 'A' Sound broke up at the end of that year.

In early 1967 Parkinson joined the Questions, alongside Bill Flemming on drums (ex- Midnighters, Roland Storm and the Statesmen, Max Merritt and the Meteors), Billy Green on guitar, Duncan McGuire on bass guitar (ex-the Phantoms, Roland Storm and the Statesmen) and Rory Thomas on piano, organ, woodwind and brass. The group had previously released an album, What Is a Question? (November 1966), providing "sub-Herb Alpert pastiches." The group held a residency at the Manly Pacific Hotel, in the Sydney suburb. Parkinson provided his "facility for soul and blues" for the line-up, which "lifted [the group] into the premier league of Australian mid-1960s pop."

The Questions competed in the Hoadley's Battle of the Sounds in July 1967 and finished second behind the Groop. With Parkinson the band issued three "minor psychedelic pop classic" singles, "Sally Go Round the Roses" (cover version, July 1967), "And Things Unsaid" (October) and "Something Wonderful" (February 1968). They also released two extended plays, Sally Go Round the Roses and Something Wonderful. In January 1968 Ray Burton on guitar (ex-Delltones) and Les Young on bass guitar (ex-Chessmen) replaced Green and McGuire respectively. The new line-up supported international visitors, the Who, Small Faces and Paul Jones, on their Australian Big Show Tour. A month later the group broke up.

=== 1968–1971: Doug Parkinson in Focus and Fanny Adams ===
In March 1968 Doug Parkinson in Focus were formed by Parkinson, Green, McGuire and Thomas together with Doug Lavery on drums (ex-Andy James Asylum, Running Jumping Standing Still). They released a single, "I Had a Dream", in May and finished third in that year's Hoadley's Battle of the Sounds behind the Groove and then the Masters Apprentices. The first version of Doug Parkinson in Focus disbanded in August. In the following month a new line-up with Parkinson, Green and McGuire joined by Johnny Dick on drums (ex-Max Merritt and the Meteors, Billy Thorpe and the Aztecs) formed in Melbourne. They "became one of the most popular outfits on the Melbourne suburban dance/inner-city discotheque circuit" as they were "perfectly in sync with the tempo of the times." The group signed with EMI/Columbia and issued a cover version of the Beatles' track, "Dear Prudence", in May 1969, which peaked at No. 5 on the Go-Set National Top 40. Also in that year the group won the Hoadley's Battle of the Sounds national final.

The band's follow up single, "Without You" / "Hair" (October), also reached No. 5. In November Green and McGuire left to join Rush while Parkinson and Dick recruited Mick Rogers (ex-Procession) and Les Stacpool (ex-Chessmen, Merv Benton and the Tamlas) each alternating on bass and lead guitars. By February 1970 Green and McGuire had returned and Rogers and Stacpool had left. The group issued another single, "Baby Blue Eyes" (May), which reached No. 36. The group disbanded when Parkinson and Dick relocated to the United Kingdom in June 1970.

Parkinson and Dick had been invited to join Fanny Adams by founder Vince Melouney on guitar and vocals (ex-Billy Thorpe and the Aztecs, the Bee Gees), alongside Teddy Toi on bass guitar (ex-Max Merritt and the Meteors, Billy Thorpe and the Aztecs). Parkinson "conveyed considerable charisma with his imposing presence and gruff, raspy voice." The group recorded their self-titled album in London and returned to Australia in December but disbanded a month later. Fanny Adams appeared posthumously in June 1971 on MCA Records; which McFarlane described as exemplifying "adventurous, heavy, progressive blues-rock."

In February 1971 Parkinson formed another line-up of Doug Parkinson in Focus with Green and McGuire joined by Mark Kennedy on drums (ex-Spectrum, King Harvest). Their new label, Fable Records, had released the single, "Purple Curtains" (1971), which had been recorded by a previous line-up. According to McFarlane after Fanny Adams had disbanded "Such was MCA's dissatisfaction with the split that the label effectively prevented Parkinson from recording for two years." In December 1971 the line-up fractured when Kennedy and McGuire joined their former bandmate, Leo de Castro, in Friends; while Green joined Gerry and the Joy Band (see The Loved Ones#1968-1986: After disbandment).

=== 1972–1976: Solo career and the Life Organisation ===
In August 1972 Parkinson launched his solo career and issued the single, "Lonely". In March 1973 he took the role of the Hawker in the Australian musical theatre, orchestral version of the Who's rock opera, Tommy. Fellow Australian artists were Daryl Braithwaite (as Tommy), Bobby Bright, Linda George, Colleen Hewett, Jim Keays, Ian Meldrum (as Uncle Ernie, in Sydney only), Billy Thorpe, Wendy Saddington, Broderick Smith and Ross Wilson. The Sydney performance was filmed and broadcast on channel 7 in early April.

In May 1973 Parkinson released his debut solo album, No Regrets, on Polydor Records. For the sessions he used John Capek on piano (ex-Carson); drummers Russell Dunlop, Peter Figures and Graham Morgan; Tim Partridge on bass guitar; guitarists Green, Kevin Borich, Jimmy Doyle and Ross East; Roger Sellers on percussion and drums; Don Reid on flute and saxophone; and Terry Hannagan on guitar and backing vocals. It includes Parkinson's solo version of "And Things Unsaid", which he had written for the Questions, he co-wrote two tracks ("Get What You Can", "Takin' It Easy") with Capek. The singer also co-produced a track with Burton and other tracks with David Fookes. A 19–minute demo tape version of No Regrets was preserved in the Mike Eves collection.

Also in 1973 he formed a big band jazz ensemble, the Life Organisation, with Morgan and Toi joined by Warren Ford on guitar and piano; Peter Martin on guitar (ex-SCRA); and Bill Motzing on trombone and keyboards. The Life Organisation had backed Parkinson on two tracks ("Dear Prudence" and "Love Gun") on his solo album, No Regrets. The group issued six singles during 1973 and 1974; two of them reached the Kent Music Report singles chart top 100, "In the Mood (Forties Style)" (June 1973) and "Beyond the Blue Horizon" (November). In late 1973 he replaced Reg Livermore in the role of Herod in an Australian musical theatre production of Jesus Christ Superstar.

Former bandmate Green composed the soundtrack to the biker film, Stone (1974), with Parkinson singing on two tracks, "Cosmic Flash" and "Do not Go Gentle". In that year his touring band were Rod Coe on bass guitar, Bruno Lawrence on drums (ex-Max Merritt and the Meteors, BLERTA), Mick Lieber on guitar (ex-Python Lee Jackson) and Ray Vanderby on keyboards. In November he released a cover version of "Everlasting Love", which peaked at No. 22. He followed with "Love is Like a Cloudy Day" (May 1975) and "Raised on Rock" (September) but they did reach the top 100.

=== 1977–1987: The Southern Star Band and the Doug Parkinson Band ===
From December 1977 to March 1978 Parkinson returned to musical theatre in the stage show, Ned Kelly portraying Kelly Gang member, Joe Byrne. Its first run was at the Festival Theatre, Adelaide and was followed by a run at Her Majesty's Theatre, Sydney. The Bulletin's John Hoad praised his "booming voice." His touring band for solo work were Sanctuary, which included ex-Chain and ex-Renée Geyer Band members: Mal Logan on keyboards and Barry Sullivan on bass guitar.

In 1978 Parkinson formed the Southern Star Band, comprising former bandmates Kennedy and McGuire and new associates Frank Esler-Smith on keyboards (ex-Marcia Hines Band) and Jim Gannon on guitar (ex-Black Widow, Yellow Dog). Gannon was soon replaced by Tommy Emmanuel on guitar (ex-Goldrush, the Emmanuel Brothers Band). McFarlane felt the group "played slick, funky jazz over an R&B foundation." They issued four singles with "I'll Be Around" (January 1979) the highest charting, which reached No. 22 on the Kent Music Report Singles Chart. The singer had heard fellow Australian artist, Ross Wilson, perform a cover version of the original, "I'll Be Around", by the Spinners at a Kings Cross nightclub and decided to get his group to record their own rendition. The album of the same name was "a steady seller" and reached the related Top 40 albums chart. Parkinson also sang the opening theme song of the short-lived TV soap opera, Arcade (1980), which was issued as a solo single.

Early in 1981 Southern Star Band were renamed as the Doug Parkinson Band with George Limbidis on bass guitar (ex-Highway), Adrian Payne on drums (ex-Pantha, Broderick Smith's Hired Hands), Tim Piper on guitar (ex-Chain, Blackfeather) and Dave Richard on guitar. They issued seven singles from March 1981 to September 1983, including a cover version of "The Sun Ain't Gonna Shine Anymore" featuring Broderick Smith on duet vocals in July 1981. Their album, Heartbeat to Heartbeat, appeared in March 1983, which reached the top 60. He appeared in another Australian production of Jesus Christ Superstar, but this time as Judas, which included a run in Tamworth in May 1984 and then Perth during 1984.

=== 1988–2021: Musical theatre and later career ===
From the late 1980s to the early 2000s Parkinson "concentrated on musical theatre" with roles in Australian stage productions of Big River: The Adventures of Huckleberry Finn (April 1989: Brisbane, May 1989: Melbourne, January 1990: Adelaide), The Hunting of the Snark (October 1990: Sydney), Buddy – The Buddy Holly Story as the Big Bopper (January: Sydney and September 1991: Melbourne, April: Perth, June: Adelaide, July: Brisbane and August 1992: Sydney), Grease as Vince Fontaine (1998), Happy Days - The Arena Mega Musical as Delvicchio (1999) and The Wizard of Oz as Cowardly Lion (2002).

Parkinson continued performing in cabaret and clubs and recording as of 2016. He contributed a version of "Always to the Light" to the tribute album, Some Lonesome Picker (June 2016). He told Christian Tatman of The Herald Sun that "My favourite thing is working with a crowd. It's what I'm going to keep doing. I have no plans for retirement." In early 2017 Parkinson undertook a tour featuring the music of Joe Cocker. Highlights of the shows included Cocker's songs and his own hits as well as songs made famous by others, such as Ray Charles and the Beatles.

== Personal life ==
In 1968, Parkinson married Suzie Clark, who later became his talent manager; the couple had two children. The family were long-term residents of Sydney's Northern Beaches. One of their children, Daniel Parkinson, was the bass guitarist for the Hanging Tree, a progressive metal group from 1992 to 2002. Daniel has also worked as a graphic designer and photographer.

The couple also ran their own record label, Roy Boy Records, from 2005, which issued Parkinson's latter-day solo material.

Parkinson died on 15 March 2021, aged 74, at his Northern Beaches home. He was a passionate supporter of Manly Warringah Sea Eagles rugby league club.

== Discography ==
=== Studio albums ===
List of albums, with Australian chart positions
Title	Album details	Peak chart positions
Title	Album details	AUS
No Regrets	Released: June 1973; Format: LP, cassette; Label: Polydor (2907004)	—
I'll Be Around (with The Southern Star Band)	Released: March 1979; Format: LP, cassette; Label: Southern Star Records (L 36824)	37
Heartbeat to Heartbeat	Released: 28 March 1983; Format: LP, cassette; Label: CBS (SBP 237862)	59
Reflections	Released: September 1986; Format: LP, cassette; Label: Hammard (HAM 147)	—
Somewhere After Midnight	Released: 2 September 2005; Format: CD; Label: Roy Boy (rbr1000)	—
Timelines	Released: 2006; Format: CD; Label: Roy Boy (rbr1000)	—
Not Fade Away	Released: 2010; Format: CD; Label: Roy Boy (rbr4000)	—
Give Me The Night	Released: 2020; Format: CD; Label: Roy Boy (RBR2020)	—

=== Live albums ===
Title	Album details
Live at Gobbles, Perth, 1979 (As Doug Parkinson and the Southern Star Band)	Released: 1 February 2021; Format: CD (limited), DD, streaming; Label: Doug Parkinson, Black Box Records/ MGM Distribution

=== Compilation albums ===
Title	Album details
In & Out of Focus 1966-75	Released: 1996; Format: CD; Label: Raven (RVCD-58)

=== Extended plays ===
Title	EP details
Something Wonderful (with The Questions)	Released: 1968; Format: LP; Label: Festival (FX-11477)
Doug Parkinson in Focus (as Doug Parkinson in Focus)	Released: 1970; Format: LP; Label: Columbia (SEGO-70188)

=== Singles ===
List of singles, with Australian chart positions
Year	Title	Peak chart positions	Album
Year	Title	AUS	Album
Credited as Doug Parkinson in Focus
1968	"Advice"/"I Had a Dream"	—	Non-album single
1969	"Dear Prudence"/"This Must Be the End"	5	Doug Parkinson in Focus
1969	"Today (I Feel No Pain)"/"Theme from 12th House"	—	Doug Parkinson in Focus
1969	"Without You"/"Hair"	4	Doug Parkinson in Focus
1970	"Baby Blue Eyes" / "Then I Run"	42	Non-album singles
1970	"Purple Curtains"/"Pour Out All You've Got"	—	Non-album singles
Credited as Doug Parkinson
1972	"Lonely"/"Takin It Easy"	42	No Regrets
1973	"Love Gun"/"Dear Prudence (No Regrets version)"	99	No Regrets
1973	"Sweet Rock 'n' Roll" /"Tell Him I'll Be All Right"	99	No Regrets
1974	"Everlasting Love"/"All I Need Is a Song"	22	Non-album singles
1975	"Love Is Like a Cloudy Day"/"One Track Mind"	95	Non-album singles
1975	"Raised On Rock" / "I'm Gonna Get You (In the End)"	—	Non-album singles
Credited as Doug Parkinson & The Southern Star Band
1978	"The Hungry Years"/"Soon As Your Thing Is Done"	88	I'll Be Around
1979	"I'll Be Around" / "Riff Raff"	22	I'll Be Around
1979	"In My Life"/"Shuffle Up"	—	I'll Be Around
1979	"Now You're On Your Own"/"You Ain't Going Nowhere Without Me"	70	I'll Be Around
1980	"Under the Influence of Love"/"Flying South"	—	Non-album single
Credited as Doug Parkinson
1980	"Arcade"/"Theme from Arcade" by The Mike Perjanik Orchestra	—	Arcade (soundtrack)
1981	"Small Talk"/"Lady Luck"	—	Non-album single
1981	"The Sun Ain't Gonna Shine (Anymore)"/"Gonna Shake It"	18	Heartbeat to Heartbeat
1981	"Solitaire"/"Go While the Goings Good"	—	Non-album single
1982	"Better Keep Your Hands Off My (Potential New Girlfriend)"/"Lady Luck"	97	Heartbeat to Heartbeat
1983	"Don't Let Love Go"/"Can't Live With You (Can't Live Without You)"	—	Heartbeat to Heartbeat
1983	"It's Your Move"/"I Don't Unlove You"	—	Heartbeat to Heartbeat
1984	"Sailin' (Sydney – Hobart)"/"Australia Sailing)" by The Kites	—	Non-album single
1987	"Willing & Abel"/"Endlessly"	—	Wind Warriors (soundtrack)
1994	"Where Would We Be Without A.B."	100	Non-album singles
1995	"Run Wallaby Run" (with The Wallabies)	—	Non-album singles
2003	"To Love Somebody" (with Marcia Hines, Brian Cadd & Max Merritt)	96	Non-album singles

==== Charity singles ====
List of charity singles, with year released, selected chart positions, and album name shown
Title	Year	Peak chart positions
Title	Year	AUS
"The Garden" (as Australia Too)	1985	22

== Awards ==
=== Mo Awards ===
The Australian Entertainment Mo Awards (commonly known informally as the Mo Awards), were annual Australian entertainment industry awards. They recognise achievements in live entertainment in Australia from 1975 to 2016. Doug Parkinson won four awards in that time.

Year	Nominee / work	Award	Result (wins only)
2000	Doug Parkinson	Classic Rock Performer of the Year	Won
2001	Doug Parkinson	Classic Rock Performer of the Year	Won
2002	Doug Parkinson	Classic Rock Performer of the Year	Won
2003	Doug Parkinson	Contemporary Rock Performer of the Year	Won
