= Words (Bee Gees song) =

1968 song by the Bee Gees

Single by the Bee Gees
- B-side: "Sinking Ships"
- Released: January 1968
- Recorded: 3 October 1967
- Genre: Pop
- Length: 3:13
- Label: Polydor (United Kingdom); Atco (United States)
- Songwriters: Barry Gibb; Robin Gibb; Maurice Gibb
- Producers: Robert Stigwood; Bee Gees

The Bee Gees UK singles chronology
"World" (1967)	"Words" (1968)	"Jumbo" (1968)

The Bee Gees US singles chronology
"Massachusetts" (1967)	"Words" (1968)	"Jumbo" (1968)

Audio sample
- "Words": file; help

"Words" is a song by the Bee Gees, written by Barry, Robin, and Maurice Gibb. The song reached No. 1 in West Germany, Canada, Switzerland and the Netherlands. It was the Bee Gees third UK top-10 hit, reaching number eight on the UK Singles Chart, and in a UK television special on ITV in December 2011 it was voted fourth in "The Nation's Favourite Bee Gees Song". The song has been recorded by many other artists, including hit versions by Rita Coolidge from her album Anytime...Anywhere in 1978 and Boyzone from their album A Different Beat in 1996. It was Boyzone's fifth single and their first number-one hit in the UK.

== Writing ==
Barry Gibb explains:

'Words' was written by me at Adams Row when I was staying at Robert [Stigwood]'s place, A lot of people began to cover that song, so over the years it's become a bit like 'To Love Somebody'. I didn't know it wasn't on an album – that's strange how it used to work in those days. We used to bang singles out one after another.

— Barry Gibb

Robin Gibb:

'Words' reflects a mood, It was written after an argument. Barry had been arguing with someone, I had been arguing with someone, and happened to be in the same mood. [The arguments were] about absolutely nothing. They were just words. That is what the song is all about; words can make you happy or words can make you sad.

— Robin Gibb

Barry Gibb said in 1996 on the VH1 Storytellers television show that it was written for their manager, Robert Stigwood.

== Recording ==
Words was recorded on 3 October 1967, along with "World" and the unreleased (and never finished) track "Maccleby's Secret" at the IBC Studios in London. The song featured vocals from only Barry Gibb and became his solo spot in concert for the remainder of the Bee Gees' career.

The recording sessions for "Words" were especially memorable for two members of the group, Barry explained:

"I remember the [first] session so clearly. Robin and I were in the studios at 9 o'clock in the morning, and Robin kept on falling asleep over the piano. I wanted him to write the piano part of the song and play it because I'm not much of a pianist, but he just couldn't keep his eyes open, so I ended up doing it myself".

"Words" was also the showcase for a new piano sound, as Maurice Gibb explained:

"We accidentally discovered the sound on 'Words'. When we were recording [it], after everyone had gone to lunch, I was sitting at the piano mucking about and I wrote a riff. I went upstairs and switched on the mike for the piano, and then I started playing about with the knobs in front of me. When I played the tape back, I had all these incredible compressed piano noises. Mike Claydon at IBC Studios, who engineered all our records, then said 'What the hell was that?' when he heard the piano sound. 'Come up here and listen to that sound'. It was just compression, but he didn't know what to call it then. I think he called it 'limited'. It made the piano sound like it was about 40 pianos playing at the same time and very, very thick. In 'Words' it was very beautiful but that sound on it made it sound like the LA Symphony on it. If you listen to all our records, the piano sound is on it.

According to sound engineer Damon Lyon-Shaw:

"I was the one that actually devised it, Mike Claydon was the one who took the credit for it, but i was actually piddling around at the time as his junior. On the mixer at the time, we had compressors, Maurice was playing at piano at the time, just piddling around [and] I started feeding the piano into a series of these compressors and then screwed them up until he got his lovely metallic sort of sucking sound, and that was the birth of that sound, Maurice, assumed it was Michael, so he took the credits.

Another sound engineer John Pantry offered to put things in a proper perspective:

"Well, Damon didn't make the compressor/limiter, and my memory is that we all used to use that sound once we discovered what it did to piano notes. As to who got there first is open to debate. The sound was unique because it was a home-made device that was made by a guy called Denis King".

== Release ==
The B-side for "Words" was "Sinking Ships", one of very few songs by the Bee Gees to feature all three brothers on lead vocals: Barry and Robin Gibb in the verses and Maurice Gibb on the song's chorus. The group performed this song on The Ed Sullivan Show in 1968, with Barry Gibb on vocals, Maurice Gibb on bass, Robin Gibb on piano, Vince Melouney on guitar and Colin Petersen on drums. On that performance Melouney is playing Gibson ES-335, and Maurice is playing Rickenbacker 4001. Some backing vocals near the end are heard only on the mono mix used on the single, some compilations, and the Studio Albums 1967–1968 box set.

Mixes for "Words" suffered many different problems. Since it was originally used only as a single, no stereo mix was made until Atlantic wanted one for the Best of Bee Gees album in 1969, where it made its first appearance on LP. A stereo mix with the piano, bass and drums mixed down and the vocals pushed forward was made, which fans were dissatisfied with. Polydor in the UK instead chose to use the mono mix on their version of the album. In 1990, Bill Inglot prepared an improved stereo mix. While doing so, he noticed that two short sections of backing vocal near the end of the song were on the mono mix but not on the four-track master, as if Barry added them while the mono mix was made. The Studio Albums 1967–1968 used the original mono mix. As stated on the original single release, the song was featured in the 1968 film The Mini-Affair (originally titled The Mini-Mob), where it was sung by Georgie Fame in an arrangement by Bill Shepherd.

"Words" debuted at No. 67 in Cashbox in the United States in the week of 20 January 1968. It was the Bee Gees' second UK Top 10 single after "Massachusetts".

Cashbox called it a "beautiful ballad line with a semi-soft, somewhat-rock sound obtained by the use of near classic piano, soaring strings and a pop percussion" and a "brilliant vocal lead".

== Personnel ==
- Barry Gibb – lead vocals, rhythm guitar
- Maurice Gibb – bass, piano, Mellotron
- Robin Gibb – harmony vocals
- Vince Melouney – rhythm guitar
- Colin Petersen – drums
- Bill Shepherd – orchestral arrangement

== Charts ==
=== Weekly charts ===
Chart (1968)	Peak position
Australia (Kent Music Report)	13
Austria (Ö3 Austria Top 40)	4
Belgium (Ultratop 50 Flanders)	3
Belgium (Ultratop 50 Wallonia)	9
Canada Top Singles (RPM)	1
Chile	19
Finland (Soumen Virallinen)	38
Ireland (IRMA)	14
Italy (Musica e dischi)	11
Japan (Oricon)	19
Netherlands (Single Top 100)	1
New Zealand (Recorded Music NZ)	9
Norway (VG-lista)	7
South Africa (Springbok)	5
Spain (PROMUSICAE)	15
Switzerland (Schweizer Hitparade)	1
UK Singles (Official Charts)	8
US Billboard Hot 100	15
US Cash Box Top 100	19
West Germany (GfK)	1

=== Year-end charts ===
Chart (1968)	Position
Austria (Ö3 Austria Top 40)	11
Belgium (Ultratop 50 Flanders)	20
Canada Top Singles (RPM)	50
Netherlands (Dutch Top 40)	18
Norway (VG-lista)	7
Switzerland (Schweizer Hitparade)	10

== Boyzone version ==
"Words"

Single by Boyzone

from the album A Different Beat
- B-side: "The Price of Love", "What Can You Do for Me"
- Released: 7 October 1996
- Length: 4:02
- Label: Polydor
- Songwriters: Barry Gibb, Robin Gibb, Maurice Gibb
- Producers: Phil Harding, Ian Curnow

Boyzone singles chronology
"Coming Home Now" (1996)	"Words" (1996)	"A Different Beat" (1996)

Music video
- "Words" on YouTube

Irish boyband Boyzone covered "Words" and released is as the lead single from their second studio album, A Different Beat (1996). The single was their seventh single overall, becoming their first number-one hit on the UK Singles Chart and earning a platinum certification from the British Phonographic Industry.

=== Critical reception ===
British magazine Music Week rated Boyzone's version of "Words" three out of five. The reviewer wrote, "Just when everyone has readied themselves for Boyzone's ascent to mega-stardom, they go and release their worst single to date. It will still be a massive hit, but this cover of The Bee Gees' 1968 hit is terribly uninspired."

=== Track listings ===
- UK CD1
1. "Words" (radio edit) – 3:55
2. "The Price of Love" – 3:11
3. "Words" (alternative mix) – 3:53
- UK CD2
1. "Words" (radio edit) – 3:55
2. "The Price of Love" – 3:11
3. "What Can You Do for Me" – 2:59
4. "Words" (alternative mix) – 3:53
- UK cassette single
1. "Words" (radio edit) – 3:55
2. "The Price of Love" – 3:11

=== Charts ===
Weekly charts

Chart (1996–1997)	Peak position
Australia (ARIA)	96
Austria (Ö3 Austria Top 40)	2
Belgium (Ultratop 50 Flanders)	3
Belgium (Ultratop 50 Wallonia)	16
Czech Republic (IFPI CR)	7
Estonia Airplay (Eesti Top 25)	7
Europe (Eurochart Hot 100)	6
Europe (European AC Radio)	3
Europe (European Hit Radio)	4
Europe (Channel Crossovers)	3
France (SNEP)	31
France Airplay (SNEP)	25
Germany (GfK)	7
Greece (IFPI Greece)	2
Hungary (Mahasz)	10
Iceland (Íslenski Listinn Topp 40)	11
Ireland (IRMA)	1
Israel (Israeli Singles Chart)	2
Lithuania (M-1)	1
Netherlands (Dutch Top 40)	18
Netherlands (Single Top 100)	15
Norway (VG-lista)	14
Scottish Singles Sales (Official Charts)	1
Spain Airplay (Top 40 Radio)	21
Sweden (Sverigetopplistan)	4
Switzerland (Schweizer Hitparade)	2
Taiwan (IFPI)	4
UK Singles (Official Charts)	1
UK Airplay (Music Week)	4

Year-end charts

Chart (1996)	Position
Austria (Ö3 Austria Top 40)	40
Belgium (Ultratop 50 Flanders)	67
Belgium (Ultratop 50 Wallonia)	88
Brazil (Crowley)	98
Europe (Eurochart Hot 100)	49
Germany (Media Control)	99
Israel (Israeli Singles Chart)	40
Sweden (Topplistan)	34
UK Singles (OCC)	16

Chart (1997)	Position
Europe (Eurochart Hot 100)	75

=== Certifications ===
Region	Certification	Certified units/sales
Austria (IFPI Austria)	Gold	25,000^{*}
Germany (BVMI)	Gold	250,000^{^}
United Kingdom (BPI)	Platinum	600,000^{‡}
^{^} Shipments figures based on certification alone.^{‡} Sales+streaming figures based on certification alone.

=== Release history ===
Region	Date	Format(s)	Label(s)	Ref.
United Kingdom	7 October 1996	CD; cassette	Polydor	
Japan	2 December 1996	CD	Polydor	

== Other versions ==
The song was recorded by Glen Campbell on the Wichita Lineman album released in 1968, also recorded and performed live by Elvis Presley in 1969. It was included in the 1970 concert documentary Elvis: That's the Way It Is and the 2000 special edition of the album That's the Way It Is.

Lynn Anderson recorded the song on her album Stay There 'Til I Get There, released in 1970.

Cliff Richard performed "Words" live in Berlin in 1970, accompanied by the SFB orchestra under the direction of Paul Kuhn. This recording would later be released under the title "Live in Berlin (The Broadcast Archives)". In a television interview dating from 2010, Cliff had mentioned that Barry Gibb had written "Words" specially for him, but originally did not know how to get the song to him, so the Bee Gees recorded it instead; but they did not know that Cliff had performed the song several times live because he "loved" the song.

Rita Coolidge covered the song and sang it on the BBC's weekly pop show Top of the Pops on March 2, 1978,

In 1979, country music singer Susie Allanson covered "Words" for her 1979 album Heart to Heart. Allanson's version was a number eight entry on the US Billboard Hot Country Songs that year.

In 1989, the group Tropical Panamá released a Spanish-language version (titled "Palabras") on their album Ana María.

In 2021, Barry Gibb and Dolly Parton recorded "Words" for Barry's 2021 album Greenfields.

Waylon Jennings recorded the song in the 1970s, and it was later released as the closing track to the posthumous album Diamonds in 2026.
