= Octopus (English band) =

English band

Octopus were an English psychedelic rock band, resulting from renaming a Hatfield (UK) based band named the Cortinas in late 1968. At the time of the renaming the group consisted of founder members Paul Griggs and his brother Nigel Griggs, Rick Williams and Nigel (Gary) Whinyates. As the Cortinas they released one single on Polydor in 1968. As Octopus they released one LP Restless Night on Penny Farthing in April 1971, along with several singles from 1969 to 1971.

Octopus supported many well-known groups including Cream and Yes and had several members who later joined famous groups: including drummer Brian Glascock, who replaced Nigel Whinyates in late 1969, John Cook and Tim Reeves of Mungo Jerry, and brother Nigel Griggs himself and Malcolm Green, both later of the New Zealand group, Split Enz. Paul Griggs was later a founding member of the pop group Guys 'n' Dolls.
