= Steve Foster (singer) =

Australian singer-songwriter and musician (1946–2018)

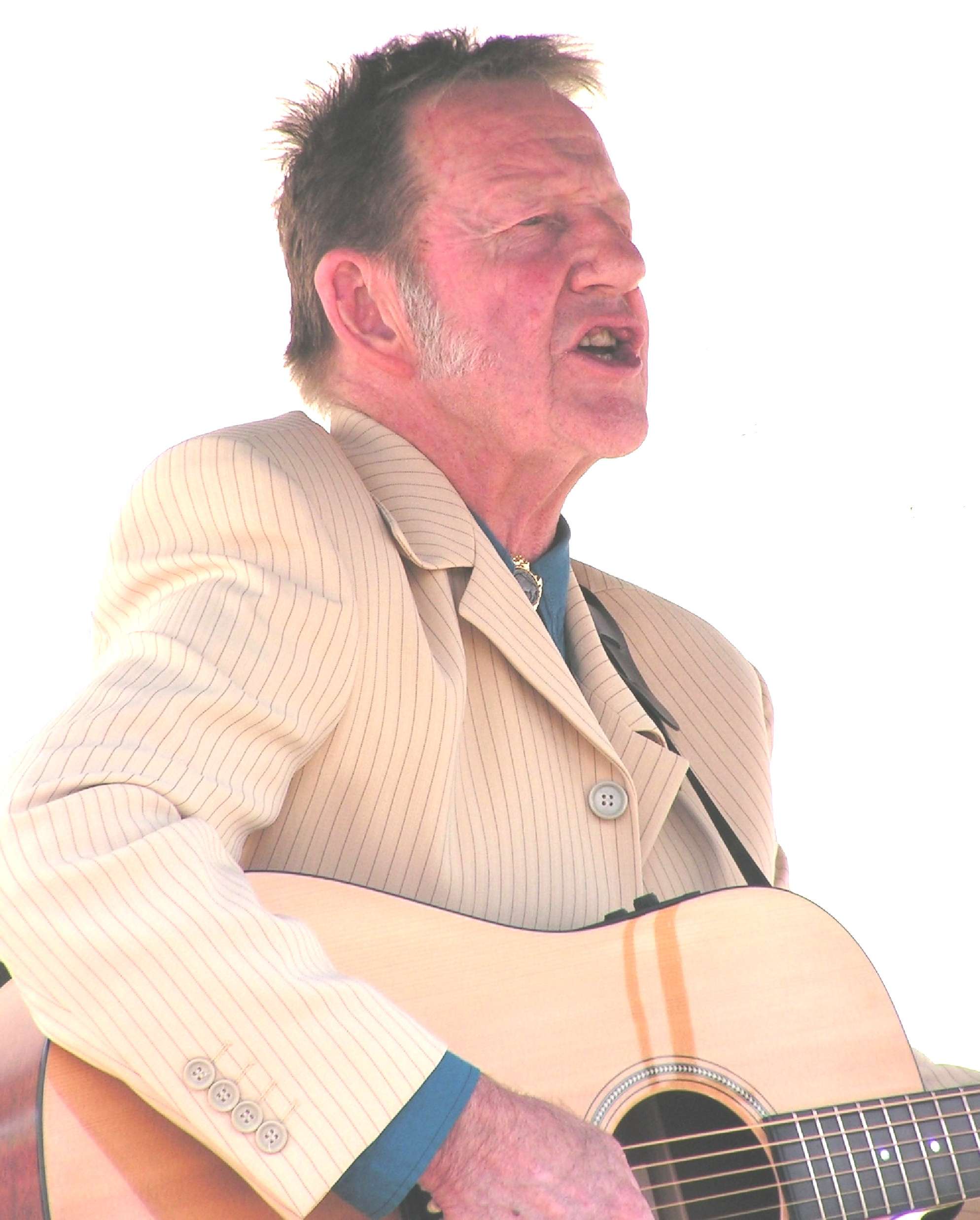
- Foster performing in 2014

Background information
- Birth name: Stephen Edward Foster
- Born: 30 September 1946 Murray Bridge, South Australia
- Died: 25 January 2018 (aged 71) Adelaide, South Australia
- Genres: folk; country; bluegrass; roots; rock
- Occupations: Singer; songwriter; musician
- Instruments: Vocals; guitar; harmonica; mandolin; tenor banjo
- Years active: 1963–2018
- Labels: Bootleg; Fable Records

Stephen Edward Foster (30 September 1946 – 25 January 2018) was an Australian singer-songwriter and musician from Murray Bridge, South Australia.

== Career ==
Foster recorded his first solo single in 1963 under the K-Bee Label while in high school. He was attending South Australian School of Art when he began a residency at The Catacombs Coffee Lounge in Hackney. He lived there for many years, even acting as caretaker. He appeared regularly on Adelaide TV including Adelaide Tonight, as well as ABC, ADS7 and Saturday mornings on Channel 10's InTime.

Although most of his career focused on solo work, Foster led bands including Inkase, Alcheringa, Head First, Beautiful Dreamer, Steve Foster Band, Limited Edition, Blackwood County and OCQ. With Blackwood County, he toured outback South Australia and opened the 2006 Outback Fringe. He was the opening act on the Brian Cadd & the Bootleg Family Australian tour 1972–1973. He performed in The Mount Lofty Rangers, which was a collection of Adelaide musicians including the late Bon Scott, before he joined AC/DC. In 1971, Foster was the only Adelaide act to play The Myponga Festival, which was Adelaide's answer to Woodstock.

In September 1972 Foster released his first solo album Coming Home in a Jar on the Bootleg Label, under Ron Tudor's record label, Fable Records. In 1995, Forever Blue, was co-written with Graeham Goble, recorded by Little River Band in 1986 on the album No Reins, the last album recorded with John Farnham. It became a huge hit in Europe. It eventually reached the Top 10 where it stayed for 12 weeks.

Foster performed across Australia and wrote and recorded over 500 songs. Foster was selected by Arts SA to represent Adelaide in the first " Made in Adelaide" promotion at the 2016 Edinburgh Fringe Festival in Scotland where his 7 sold-out concerts ensured media attention and an invite to return.

Foster was active in charity work; he volunteered two days a week at the South Australian Aviation Museum and worked on the sailing ketch Falie, helping to restore a part of Australia's maritime history. Foster was an Australia Day Ambassador and travelled every year to visit councils across South Australia to perform and explain what it means to be a proud Australian.

Steve Foster was inducted into the SA Music Hall of Fame, posthumously, at his memorial Tribute Concert at the Governor Hindmarsh Hotel where fellow musicians flew in from across Australia to perform his music and honour his legacy.

Steve Foster died on 25 January 2018 in Adelaide, South Australia, four years after being diagnosed with lung cancer.

== Associated artists ==
- Brian (Sam) Sampson
- Inkase
- Resurrection
- Black Watch
- Bob Dylan
- D'Naz
- The Mount Lofty Rangers
- Bon Scott
- Peter Head
- Brian Cadd's Bootleg Family
- Phil Manning
- Ross Ryan, Mike McClellan, Doug Ashdown
- Alcheringa
- Steeleye Span
- Stephen Foster Band
- Head First
- Richard Clapton
- Limited Edition (Beautiful Dreamer-renamed)
- The Byrds
- Cyndi Boste
- Broken Voices
- Michael Cooper
- The Tenants
- Sitting Ducks
- Graeham Goble
- John Farnham
- John Farnham & Little River Band
- Little River Band (current)
- Hank Williams
- Donovan
- Blackwood County
- The OCQ
- Jenny Loftes
- Chris Goodall

== Awards ==
- 1968: South Australia New Faces-winner
- 1968: Australian National New Faces-runner up
- 1973: 5KA Rock Award-The Most significant contribution to Recording in South Australia & Australia for:Coming Home in a Jar Album
- 1995: Forever Blue, co-write with Graeham Goble becomes huge European hit with John Farnham & LRB.
- 2006: I Guess I'm Gonna Need Somebody Else track 10 on the CD Steve Foster & Blackwood County, is awarded: APRA/SACCM SA Country Song of the Year (Traditional) 2006
- 2008: Appointed an Australia Day Ambassador by Australia Day Council
- 2011: Finalist in International Song Competition for Mike Pinder (UK, ex Searchers)
- 2016: Chosen as a South Australian representative for Made in Adelaide Showcase at Edinburgh Fringe Festival. Performed 7 sold-out concerts.
- 2018: Inducted into the SA Music Hall of Fame

== Discography ==
- 1963: Mary-Ann original A side Poison Ivy B side with The Barrons 45 rpm K-Bee Label. Murray Bridge, Written By Foster and John Upton
- 1967: Inkase (Live from channel 10) 3 track EP
- 1972: Coming Home in a Jar released on the Bootleg label LP under Ron Tudor's Fable Records.
- 1974: Alcheringa (folk-rock) recorded AAV, Melbourne, 10 track album
- 1979: Limited Edition CD
- 1984: The Stephen Foster Band 2 track single
- 1996: Big Storm Comin' 12 track CD
- 1998: The Tenants-Ordinary 3 track P CD
- 1999: The Tenants-Live 5 track EP CD
- 2004: Three New Songs acoustic duo with Max Wright CD
- 2006: Steve Foster & Blackwood County Limited Edition Outback Fringe Tour 12 track CD
- 2009: Ships & Sailors & Songs of the Sea 11 track CD
- 2011: The OCQ, 13 track CD
- 2013: Independent No.1’s Vol 3 WOA Records
- 2014: Independent No.1’s Vol 4 WOA Records
- 2015: GOA Global Chillout Zone Vol 6 WOA Records
- 2016: A Life in Music 1972-2012 released on Steve Foster Music label, 12 track retrospective CD (August)

== Gallery ==
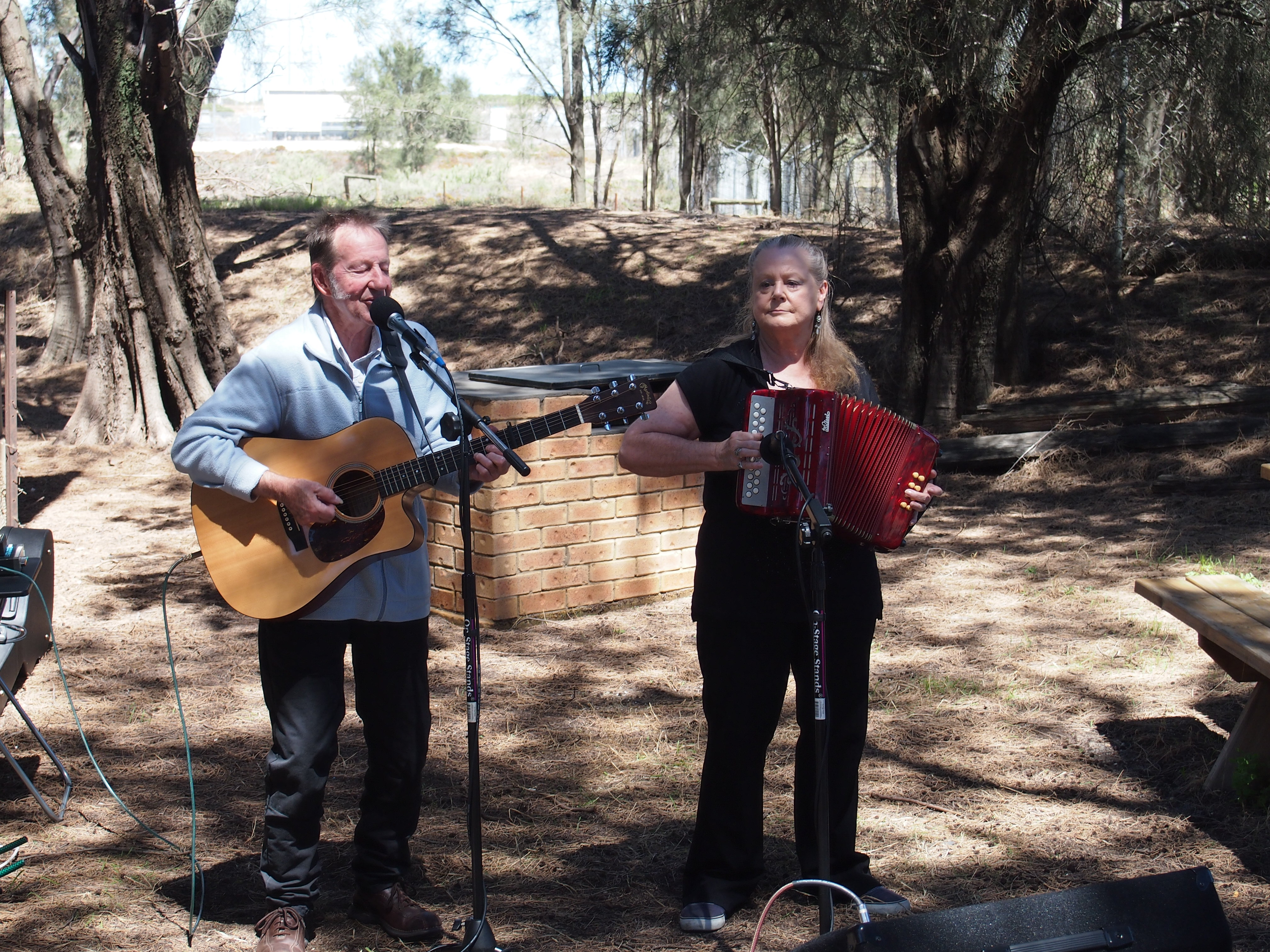
Steve Foster and Jenny Loftes performing at the historic Torrens Island Quarantine Station, 23 February 2014.
