= 192TV =

- Country: Netherlands
- Broadcast area: Netherlands
- Headquarters: Nijkerk, Netherlands

Programming
- Picture format: 1080i HDTV (downscaled to 16:9 576i for the SDTV feed)

Ownership
- Owner: BR Music BV

History
- Launched: 29 July 2010; 15 years ago

Links
- Website: www.192tv.tv

Availability

Streaming media
- 192 Online: Register for Live Watch
- Ziggo GO: ZiggoGO.tv (Europe only)

192TV is a Dutch music television station that broadcasts mainly music videos from the 1950s, 1960s and 1970s, commonly known as oldies. The channel was founded by Bert van Breda, René Kroon and Ad Bouman, and is owned by BR Music BV. The name is referring to the defunct offshore pirate radio station Radio Veronica from the 1960s and 1970s that aired on wavelength 192 meters (1562 kHz). The channel is available as a cable channel. The channel is passed by most providers of digital television. 192TV launched through cable operator Caiway in the Netherlands on July 29, 2010.

The broadcasts of 192TV began in late August 2010. The name refers to the first transmission frequency on which Radio Veronica aired. The channel has a high retro character. Promotional videos are shown for singles from the time that the offshore radio station (still) existed, sometimes interspersed with later work.

On Saturday afternoon, music videos are shown using old Dutch Top 40.
