= Vince Melouney =

Australian musician (born 1945)

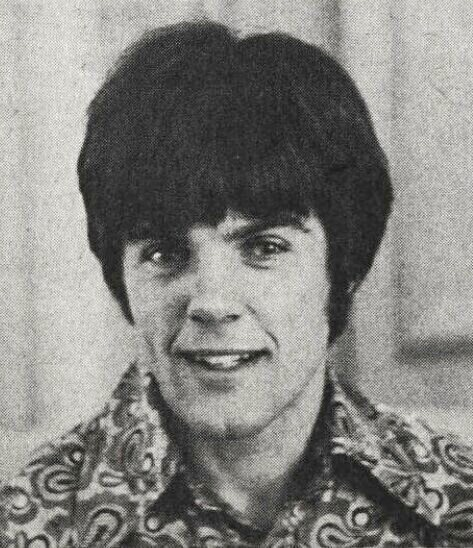
- Melouney in 1968

Background information
- Born: Vincent Melouney; 18 August 1945 (age 81); Sydney, Australia
- Genres: Rock; beat; psychedelic rock; psychedelic pop; hard rock; garage rock
- Occupations: Musician; singer; songwriter
- Instruments: Guitar; vocals
- Years active: 1963–present

Vincent Melouney (born 18 August 1945) is an Australian musician. He is best known as an official member of the Bee Gees from 1967 to 1969 during the group's initial period of worldwide success.

Before becoming a member of the Bee Gees in March 1967, he founded the bands The Vibratones (1963), The Aztecs (1964), Vince And Tony's Two (1965), and The Vince Maloney Sect (1966). Billy Thorpe later joined The Aztecs. Melouney assembled the Australian "supergroup" Fanny Adams in 1970. Along with Tony Worsley and The Blue Jays in 1965, Ashton, Gardner and Dyke in 1969, and The Cleves in 1971, he also had brief stints with each group.

== Early life ==
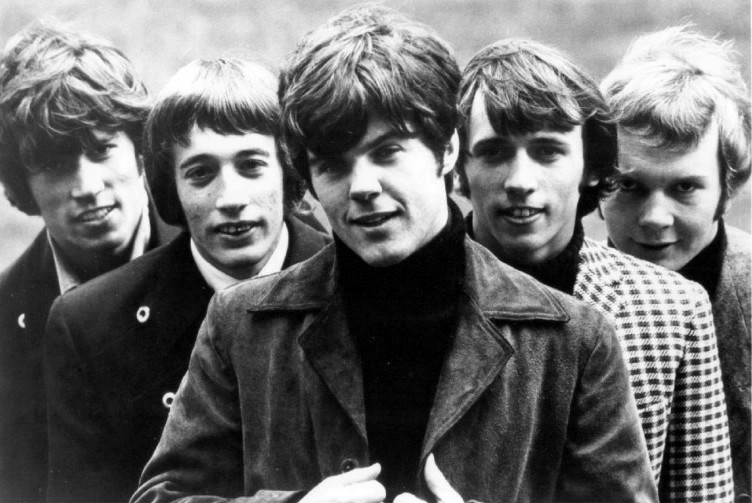
The Bee Gees in 1967. Vince Melouney is in the centre.

Vince Melouney was born in Sydney on 18 August 1945 and attended Normanhurst Boys High School from 1958 to 1961. Maloney was a founding member of Billy Thorpe & the Aztecs, whose cover of "Poison Ivy" kept The Beatles from the Number 1 spot on the Sydney music charts at the very moment that the Fab Four was making its first and only tour of Australia. Melouney was the band's lead guitarist from 1963 to 1965, playing on five Top Ten hits. This was followed by a short-lived duo with fellow Aztec Tony Barber, called Vince & Tony's Two. In 1966, he released two singles by The Vince Maloney Sect including the Garage Rock classic "No Good Without You" along with a solo single, "I Need Your Lovin' Tonight" and its B-side, "Mystery Train"; Barry Gibb, Robin Gibb, and Maurice Gibb sing backup vocals on both songs. Melouney also played guitar with The Beatles' mentor Tony Sheridan and the Joe Meek-produced artists Heinz and Screaming Lord Sutch when they toured Australia in the 1960s.

== Bee Gees ==
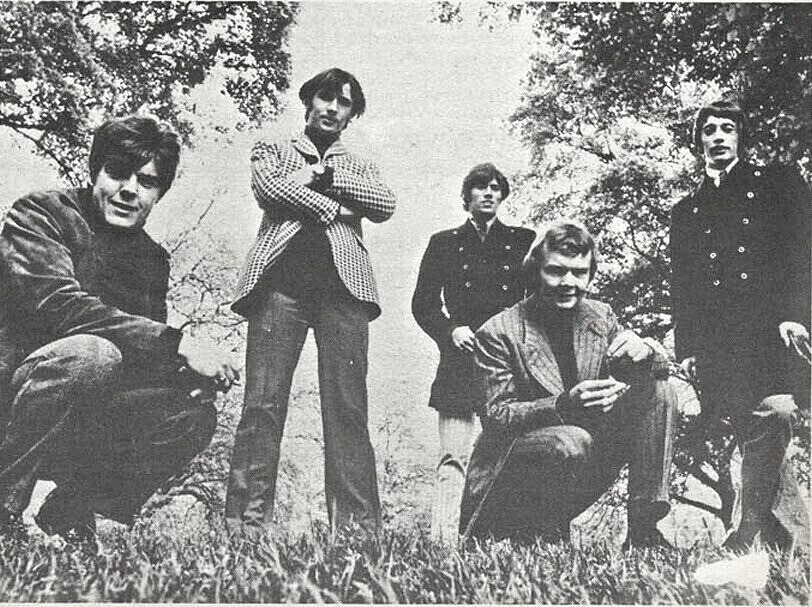
Melouney (far left) with the Bee Gees, 1967

In late 1966, Melouney relocated to London where (after the Gibbs arrived there in early 1967) he was invited to join the Bee Gees, becoming an official member and partner, along with Barry Gibb, Robin Gibb, Maurice Gibb and Colin Petersen. As a member of The Bee Gees, Melouney played on seven US Top 20 singles; "New York Mining Disaster 1941," "To Love Somebody," "Holiday," "Massachusetts," "Words," "I've Gotta Get A Message To You" and "I Started A Joke", plus four US Top 20 albums: Bee Gees' First, Horizontal, Idea and Odessa. Tracks featuring Melouney also appear on the Bee Gees' platinum album Their Greatest Hits: The Record and their gold albums Best of Bee Gees, Number Ones and Ultimate Bee Gees.

His television appearances with the Bee Gees include The Ed Sullivan Show, The Smothers Brothers Comedy Hour and Rowan & Martin's Laugh-In in the US, How On Earth and Top of the Pops in the UK and Beat Club in Germany.

The Bee Gees' songs involving Melouney have been covered by Elvis Presley, Frank Sinatra, Tom Jones, Rod Stewart, Janis Joplin, Leonard Cohen, Nick Cave, Nina Simone, Gram Parsons, Dusty Springfield, Blur, Noel Gallagher, The Flaming Lips and many other artists.

In June 1968, while he was a Bee Gee he wrote and sang lead on "Such a Shame" (the only song on a Bee Gees album that was not written by one of the Gibb brothers). The song was released on the UK version of the album Idea, but on the US version, it was replaced by "I've Gotta Get a Message to You".

Melouney prefers the Gibson Les Paul guitar and can be seen playing this model (and occasionally a Gibson SG or a Fender Telecaster) in numerous Bee Gees videos and live performances from 1967 and 1968. Melouney endorsed Vox Amplification beginning in 1963, using an AC30 at performances and on all recordings (including "Bee Gees' First") until late 1967 when he received an endorsement from Marshall Amplification (initially using a 100 watt Super Lead) and has mostly used Marshall amps ever since, with the occasional use of a Vox AC30 for shows and an AC10 for recording.

In November 1968, it was reported by the UK music magazine, NME, that Melouney's final concert with the Bee Gees would be on 1 December, following the end of their current German tour. The original 5-piece Bee Gees broke up in 1969 with the Gibb brothers reforming as a trio in 1970.

A total of 149 individual mono, stereo and alternate tracks that Melouney was involved with have been released by the Bee Gees so far (not counting unauthorised BBC and live recordings).

== Later career ==
In 1969, Melouney produced the debut single "Maiden Voyage" by Ashton, Gardner and Dyke with George Harrison visiting a session at Apple Studios. The b-side, "See The Sun in My Eyes" is actually a Melouney solo recording (originally recorded for Apple Records,) written, performed and produced by Melouney and donated to Ashton, Gardner and Dyke. Due to restructuring at Apple, the single was released by Melouney's former label, Polydor Records.

In 1970, Melouney signed a solo deal with Kapp/MCA Records and used this opportunity to form and produce the short-lived group, Fanny Adams, with Doug Parkinson on lead vocals, Teddy Toi on bass, and Johnny Dick on drums who recorded one eponymous album Fanny Adams.

Also in 1970, Melouney discovered American singer Donna Gaines (who would eventually become Donna Summer) in Germany and brought her to London where he produced a single "Sally Go 'Round the Roses" b/w "So Said The Man" (written by Melouney and Doug Parkinson.) This single was released in 1970 by MCA Records in the UK via Melouney's production arrangement with the label.

In the summer of 1976, he met up with former Bee Gees bandmate Barry Gibb and they wrote "Let It Ride" and "Morning Rain", but neither song was recorded. Melouney eventually recorded "Let It Ride" in early 2023 with his band Tall Poppy Syndrome, it was released as a digital single on 19 May 2023.

He rejoined The Bee Gees for the "One Night Only" concert in Sydney, playing to an audience of 66,000 fans at Stadium Australia on 27 March 1999 and later reunited with Billy Thorpe and the original Aztecs for the successful "Long Way to the Top" tour in 2002 and 2003. After finishing that tour, he completed his first solo album, released with the title Covers which had ten cover versions of songs, including "Poison Ivy", "Come Together", and "Over The Rainbow".

Melouney's influence was the Band, through their album Music from Big Pink, as he explained: "I am influenced to the extent that I can see what they are doing and I respect that. I've let their ideas augment my ideas".

In 2020, Melouney released his version of his friends the Easybeats' song "Women (Make You Feel Alright)", which was produced by Shel Talmy. "Women" features Melouney on vocal and lead guitar, joined by Clem Burke of Blondie on drums, Jonathan Lea of The Jigsaw Seen on additional guitars, Alec Palao on bass and Paul Kopf on backing vocals. Palao and Kopf are members of the San Francisco-based band, Strangers in a Strange Land, and also play in the current version of the veteran garage rock band, the Seeds.

He appears in the internationally successful 2020 documentary The Bee Gees: How Can You Mend A Broken Heart, in newly filmed interview segments and archival footage. This documentary was nominated for six Emmy Awards, including Outstanding Documentary Special.

In 2021, he collaborated with Strangers in a Strange Land on the Bee Gees' 1967 rarity "Ring My Bell." Like "Women," Melouney is joined on this track by Clem Burke of Blondie on drums and Jonathan Lea of The Jigsaw Seen on additional guitar and Mellotron. "Ring My Bell" was also produced by Shel Talmy. These five musicians (Melouney, Paul Kopf, Lea, Alec Palao and Burke) then formed the group Tall Poppy Syndrome, releasing their version of Robin Gibb's song "Come Some Christmas Eve (Or Halloween)" later that year.

In 2021, the Bee Gees' track "Whisper Whisper" (including Melouney) was included in the soundtrack of the Disney film Cruella.

Melouney co-wrote the foreword for the book The Bee Gees in the 1960s by Andrew Mon Hughes, Grant Walters and Mark Crohan, published by Sonicbond in 2021.

Melouney occasionally tours Europe performing a solo spot in the musical Massachusetts, with former member of The Bee Gees' backing band, keyboard player Blue Weaver.

== Discography ==
=== With Billy Thorpe & The Aztecs ===
- "Blue Day" / "You Don't Love Me" (Apr 1964)
- "Poison Ivy" / "Broken Things" (Jun 1964)
- "Mashed Potato" / "Don't Cha Know" (Aug 1964)
- "Sick and Tired" / "About Love" (Oct 1964)
- "Over The Rainbow" / "That I Love" (Dec 1964)

=== With the Bee Gees ===
- Bee Gees' 1st (1967)
- Horizontal (1968)
- Idea (1968)
- Odessa (1969) (on some tracks)
- Cucumber Castle (1970) (only on "I.O.I.O")
