= Colin Petersen =

Australian musician (1946–2024)

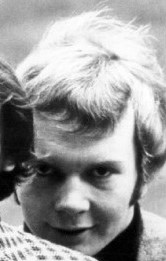
- Petersen in 1967
- Born: Frederick Colin Petersen; 24 March 1946; Kingaroy, Queensland, Australia
- Died: 18 November 2024 (aged 78)
- Occupations: Musician; songwriter; record producer; actor
- Years active: 1955–2024
- Spouse: Joanne Newfield (m. 1968)
- Children: 2
- Musical career
- Genres: Rock; pop
- Instruments: Drums; piano; guitar
- Labels: Spin; Polydor; Atco; Parlophone
- Formerly of: Steve & The Board; Bee Gees; Humpy Bong

Frederick Colin Petersen (24 March 1946 – 18 November 2024) was an Australian musician and actor. He played as a member of the bands Steve and the Board, the Bee Gees and Humpy Bong. In August 1969, he left the Bee Gees and he was replaced by Pentangle drummer Terry Cox to record the songs for their 1970 album Cucumber Castle. His scenes from the film of the same name were cut, and he is not credited on the accompanying album soundtrack, even though he does play on some songs.

== Life and career ==
=== Early life and acting career ===
School admission registers at Queensland State Archives show that Frederick Colin Petersen was admitted to Kingaroy State School in February 1951 at the age of four. He stayed there until May 1953 when he left half-way through Grade 3 and was enrolled at Humpybong State School at Margate, Queensland. He stayed at Humpybong State School until March 1958, when he was enrolled at Chermside State School where he finished Grade 7. His schooling at Humpybong State School was interrupted for nine months in 1957 and four months in 1958.

Frederick Colin Petersen began his acting career at the age of seven. When he was still nine years old in late 1955, he starred in the film Smiley (released in 1956), with Sir Ralph Richardson, but by the time he was 12 in 1958 he was forced to cease acting as his mother felt it was interfering with his education. Other film credits included The Scamp (1957), A Cry from the Streets (1958) and, much later, Barney (1976). Smiley, The Scamp and A Cry from the Streets were all successful and in 1957 Petersen was voted one of the biggest stars at the British box office.

In 1958, before his mother took him back to Australia to focus on his education, he was screen-tested for the part of the young hero in Tiger Bay, but the part eventually went to the then 12 years old Hayley Mills instead, the part being rewritten for a girl. He attended the Humpybong State School but, according to school admission registers, left there just a few weeks before Robin and Maurice Gibb enrolled there. School admission registers at Queensland State Archives show he finished Grade 7 at Chermside State School, then attended Industrial High School in Brisbane in 1960 and 1961, before boarding at Ipswich Grammar School in 1962 and 1963, graduating in December 1963.

After leaving school he played with several bands including Steve and the Board and became acquainted with Maurice Gibb, who invited him to sit in on one of the Bee Gees' sessions in Sydney. He ended up becoming friends with the family and ultimately played on as many as a dozen of their early Australian sides. When Petersen left the Board, he was replaced by Geoff Bridgford, who would replace him again later on as a member of the Bee Gees.

=== 1967–69: the Bee Gees ===
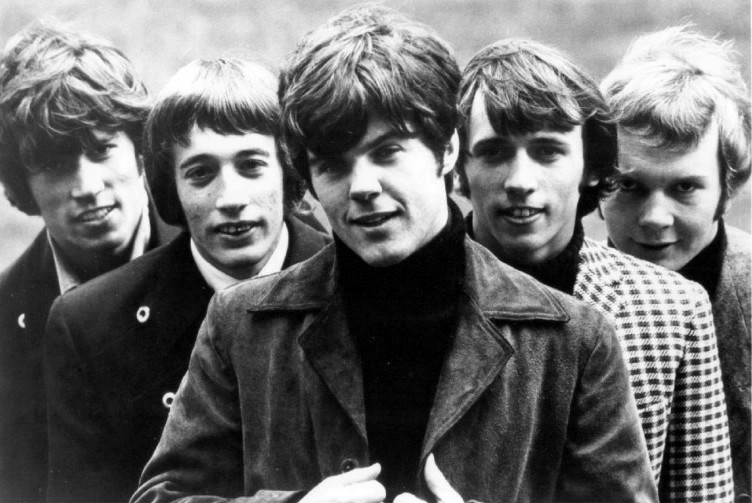
The Bee Gees in 1967. Petersen is on the far right

Petersen moved to England in 1966, little knowing that the Bee Gees would soon be doing the same and they recruited him as their permanent drummer shortly afterwards – the first non-Gibb brother to become an official member of the Bee Gees. He played on six albums Bee Gees' 1st, Horizontal, Idea, Odessa and Cucumber Castle.

He and fellow band member Vince Melouney, who played lead guitar and had also moved to the UK, had some trouble when, in the late summer of 1967, they were threatened with deportation because of an error in the way they had secured their visas. That problem was solved only by the intervention of the group's manager, Robert Stigwood, who mounted a publicity campaign that embarrassed the government into permitting them to remain in the UK. While he was a Bee Gee, he and Maurice Gibb wrote "Everything That Came From Mother Goose" with lead vocals and guitar by Petersen, but it was not released. Also in 1968, he played drums on the Marbles' debut single, "Only One Woman".

As Petersen learned about the music industry, he raised questions about the group's finances and Stigwood's conflict of interest as the Bee Gees' manager, since Stigwood owned their recordings and publishing and was in effect their employer. According to Petersen this led to him being fired in August 1969, while the group were making a television film of Cucumber Castle. Petersen had already recorded the songs used in the film, which make up part of the album, but he is not credited on the sleeve. Pentangle drummer Terry Cox was brought in to complete the remainder of the drum tracks, but it is not really clear which tracks have Petersen or Cox on drums.

Vince Melouney and Robin Gibb had already left the band by then, leaving just Barry Gibb, Maurice Gibb and Colin Petersen. He was fired, allegedly for having lost interest in the group and missing recording sessions, and for his refusal to do any acting in the film, despite his experience in front of the cameras. He did not join the Bee Gees for the Australian concert of the One Night Only gig, unlike Vince Melouney.

=== 1969–70: Humpy Bong ===
The first musician he worked with after leaving the Bee Gees was Jonathan Kelly. Petersen produced some of his early solo singles, and in 1970 the two decided to form a band together. It was called Humpy Bong, a two-word variation of the name of the school that Petersen and the Gibb brothers attended in Australia. As they needed additional musicians, they placed an advertisement. Tim Staffell answered and he got the job as singer and harmonica player. The trio recorded their debut single and appeared on BBC Television's Top of the Pops. Before the end of 1970 the group broke up without having played any concerts.

=== 1970–2024: Later career ===
Petersen managed Jonathan Kelly as a solo artist during the early 1970s, subsequent to Humpy Bong disbanding. He returned to Australia in 1974 where, having lost his rights to royalties after his court case against the Bee Gees, eventually became a painter residing in Sydney. He remained close to Melouney, but became bitter towards his other ex-bandmates about his lost royalties. He briefly returned to acting with a small role in the TV serial The Restless Years.

Petersen often played in "The Best of the Bee Gees tribute show". At first, he was reluctant to rejoin the group, but then he "went to see the show. It would have been about the third song in, and I thought to myself, bloody hell, this band is really great, and the voices were so close, and it was well presented and they all seem really comfortable on stage and enjoying it, which is really important."

From 1990 until his death, Petersen was managed by Greg Shaw.

When speaking about his career and drumming in 2022, he said: "I wasn’t the most technically skilled drummer, but I think that sometimes less is more. When you're limited, you have to get creative, just like Chuck Berry, who made magic with just a few chords. For me, it was always about serving the song."

== Personal life ==
Petersen was required to register for National Service and was called up on 11 March 1966, but he was found medically unfit to serve in the army.

Petersen described the contrasting dispositions of the Gibb brothers as follows:

"They have totally different personalities, Robin is a very temperamental and very highly strung person. His music is his whole life and he is highly sensitive to criticism. Barry is a very easy-going and receptive type. He adapts himself to the situations he finds himself in at the time. He is very interested in the potential acting possibilities of the group. I think he would like to be a film star more than a singer. Maurice is closer to my attitudes and ideas. He has the same kind of humour as I have. We have other common interests like playing chess. He's the kind of guy who will come over and give you a hand washing the car. As brothers, they really have very little in common, except the feeling that they are living for the day".

On 1 June 1968, Petersen married Joanne Newfield in Nassau, Bahamas, with fellow Bee Gees member Vince Melouney as the best man. Joanne had worked as a personal assistant to Brian Epstein up until his death, and then for Robert Stigwood. After the couple's wedding Petersen and Newfield went on honeymoon in Majorca, which was spoiled somewhat when Joanne fell ill with German measles. In 1969, Petersen and his wife began a management company.

Colin and Joanne have two sons: Jaime, born in 1971 and Ben born in 1976. The family relocated to Australia in December 1974.

The Bee Gees' manager Robert Stigwood said about Petersen:

"Colin is a very level-headed person, despite being a racing car enthusiast. He's a very sophisticated person. He has a good appreciation of good food and wines. He's 100 per cent professional in everything he does and he's an old professional like the Gibbs because he's been in entertainment as a child as they were, too"

== Death ==
Petersen died in his sleep on 18 November 2024, at the age of 78. He was survived by his wife and two children. Four days earlier former Bee Gees drummer Dennis Bryon had also died.

== Discography ==
=== With the Bee Gees ===
- Spicks and Specks (1966) (on other songs)
- Bee Gees' 1st (1967)
- Horizontal (1968)
- Idea (1968)
- Odessa (1969)
- Cucumber Castle (1970) (on some tracks, uncredited)
