= Robert Stigwood =

Australian music and film producer (1934–2016)

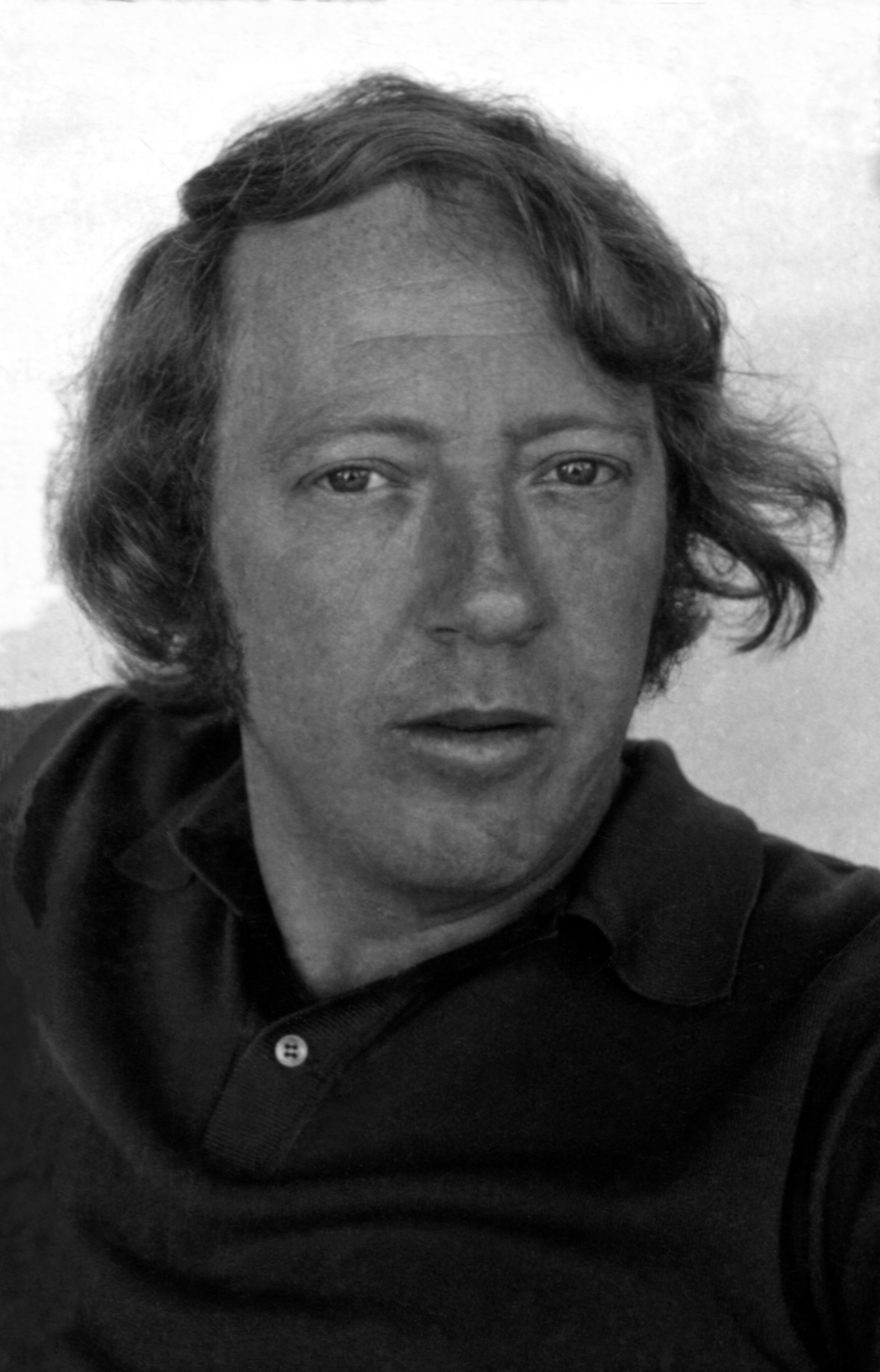
- Photo by Allan Warren in 1972
- Born: Robert Colin Stigwood; 16 April 1934; Port Pirie, South Australia, Australia
- Died: 4 January 2016 (aged 81); London, England
- Occupations: Record producer; record executive; film producer; impresario
- Years active: 1954–2016
- Known for: Manager of: Cream; Bee Gees; Andy Gibb

Robert Colin Stigwood (16 April 1934 – 4 January 2016) was an Australian music entrepreneur, film producer, and impresario, long based in the United Kingdom. He was best known for managing musicians such as Cream, Andy Gibb, and the Bee Gees; theatrical productions such as Hair and Jesus Christ Superstar; and film productions, including Grease and Saturday Night Fever.

One journalist referred to him as "one of the entertainment industry’s most powerful tycoons," and Playbill called him as "omnipresent in the 1960s and 1970s, with stakes in some of the biggest going concerns in music, theatre and film."

== Early life and education ==
Robert Colin Stigwood was born on 16 April 1934 in Port Pirie, South Australia, the son of Gwendolyn (Burrows) and Gordon Stigwood. He was educated at Sacred Heart College in Adelaide.

Stigwood moved from Australia to the UK in 1955. Among various early jobs, he worked at an institution for "backward teenage boys" in East Anglia. He worked briefly for Hector Ross at the New Theatre Royal in Portsmouth, Hampshire, before Ross left and the theatre closed.

== Career ==
=== 1960s pop management ===
He then met businessman Stephen Komlosy with whom he founded Robert Stigwood Associates Ltd, a small theatrical agency. He signed the actor John Leyton who soon became a teenage heart-throb in 1960 thanks to his appearance in a TV drama based on Biggles. Leyton had ambitions to sing, but was rejected by the major record companies; so Stigwood took him to the producer Joe Meek, who produced the singles "Tell Laura I Love Her" and "Girl on the Floor Above" (October 1960). According to Tony Kent (Meek's personal assistant at the time), although Meek was present at the recording for the latter, Stigwood assumed the role of dominant co-producer. Neither record made much impact, but Leyton's third single, "Johnny Remember Me", produced by Meek and released in the UK on 28 July 1961, became a UK No.1 hit after Stigwood arranged for Leyton to perform it while playing the role of a fictional pop singer called Johnny St. Cyr, performing the song on the new Associated Television drama Harpers West One. Stigwood and Meek licensed the song to EMI Records, who had previously refused the opportunity to sign Leyton for themselves. This action put the men among the first independent record producers in the UK.

Other artists Stigwood signed to a management/recording deal included Mike Sarne, whose Komlosy-produced "Come Outside" charted Number One in 1962, and another Meek protégé, Mike Berry, who had scored a hit with the Geoff Goddard-penned "Tribute To Buddy Holly".

One of the first musical acts he managed during this period was Junco Partners, a blues band which succeeded the Animals as the house band at Newcastle's Club A Go Go. The band recorded for Columbia (the EMI label) and the French Barclay Records, with one of its first releases being co-produced by Stigwood and Vicki Wickham. The band included Charlie Harcourt, later of Lindisfarne and Cat Mother and the All Night News Boys.

Some of the acts he promoted in the mid-60s lost Stigwood money, including UK tours by Chuck Berry and P. J. Proby, and he came close to bankruptcy during this period.

In 1966 he began managing Cream, formed from two other bands that Stigwood had under contract – Eric Clapton from John Mayall's Bluesbreakers, and Jack Bruce and Ginger Baker from the Graham Bond Organisation. They were stars by 1967, after a U.S. tour with The Who – for whom Stigwood was booking agent at the time. Stigwood moved his recording activities to Polydor Records, negotiating a much more advantageous deal than he had achieved with EMI. During 1966 and 1967 Stigwood operated the Reaction Records label, with UK distribution by Polydor. Though the label was short lived it had great success with Cream and The Who.

=== Diversification ===
In 1967, at the suggestion of Beatles manager Brian Epstein, Robert Stigwood merged his agency with Epstein’s company NEMS. Within weeks of joining NEMS he started managing the Bee Gees, a vocal group who, after many years in Australia, had just returned to their native UK with hopes of a British career. Within months their first international single, "New York Mining Disaster 1941", had become a major British and US hit reaching the top 20 in both markets, while "Massachusetts" reached number 1 in the UK and number 11 in the US, launching a string of Bee Gees hits that continued throughout the late 1960s and beyond. When Brian Epstein unexpectedly died in August 1967, Stigwood was seen as a potential successor to the NEMS organisation, but The Beatles refused to work with him. As a result he left NEMS, with a "golden handshake", to form his own Robert Stigwood Organisation, bringing the Bee Gees with him.

Also during 1967, Stigwood purchased a controlling interest in Associated London Scripts, a writers' agency co-founded by Spike Milligan and Eric Sykes in 1954, in which many of Britain's best comedy and television scriptwriters had been involved. Beryl Vertue from ALS was appointed as deputy chairman. Vertue was responsible for selling the formats to US producers of the TV series All in the Family and Sanford and Son, which were adapted from the popular British TV shows Till Death Us Do Part and Steptoe and Son.

Stigwood produced the Broadway shows Hair and Oh! Calcutta! for the West End stage in 1968 and 1970 respectively. In 1971, he produced the first theatrical production of Jesus Christ Superstar - initially in the USA - beginning a successful working relationship with Andrew Lloyd Webber and Tim Rice which continued later in the decade with Evita.

=== 1970s to 1990s ===
Stigwood also moved into film and TV production in the early 1970s. By this time both of his major music acts were in the doldrums. The Bee Gees broke up briefly in 1970, and after reuniting they floundered for several years, reaching a self-acknowledged "rock bottom". At this time the former chart-toppers were reduced to playing the working men's club circuit in northern England.

Although Cream had disbanded in late 1968, lead guitarist Eric Clapton remained in a contract with RSO. His next project, the highly touted super-band Blind Faith, which united Clapton and Ginger Baker with Steve Winwood (ex-Traffic) and Ric Grech (ex-Family) fizzled out after just one LP. In addition, the album he made as Derek & the Dominos, Layla & Other Assorted Love Songs (1970), though now recognised as a masterpiece, was met with a relatively poor critical and commercial reception, and was overshadowed by the tragic deaths of close friends Jimi Hendrix and Duane Allman. These tragedies, combined with the angst of his unrequited love for Patti Boyd, sent Clapton into a downward spiral of depression and drug abuse. Clapton eventually kicked his habit, and Stigwood took him back to Miami, where he recorded his successful comeback album 461 Ocean Boulevard (1974), which included his US #1 hit version of Bob Marley's "I Shot The Sheriff".

Soon afterwards, Clapton suggested the Bee Gees might also benefit from a change of scene, and so they moved with their band into the same house on Ocean Boulevard to record their album Main Course. Stigwood urged them to change their sound from the ballads which had made them famous, and they began to move towards the disco sound that would bring them their greatest success, starting with "Jive Talking" - a US Billboard #1 hit in 1975. The records were released on Stigwood's own label, RSO Records, which he founded in 1973.

Stigwood expanded into film production with success. He had some money in the company Virgin Films which made low budget comedies. His first feature film was a hit screen adaptation of Jesus Christ Superstar (1973), made in association with its director, Norman Jewison. He followed this with the film version of The Who's Tommy (1975), which became one of the most successful films at the box office during its year of release. In 1975, RSO collaborated with Bob Banner Associates to produce a stunt game show, Almost Anything Goes. The program, which aired on the ABC network in the US, featured three teams of players from small towns in a competition where the emphasis was on good will. The show lasted four seasons.

Stigwood signed actor John Travolta to a million dollar three-picture contract in 1976. Many in the film industry were reportedly sceptical, because Travolta was at that time known as a TV actor; but RSO Films' next production, Saturday Night Fever, made him a leading movie star. The film had an unlikely source - a supposedly factual magazine article which Stigwood had licensed. The double-LP soundtrack, written by and featuring the Bee Gees, became the biggest selling soundtrack album ever released. Stigwood followed this with a hugely successful film adaptation of the stage rock'n'roll musical Grease (1978), which co-starred Travolta and Australian singer Olivia Newton-John. Stigwood insisted that additional songs be added to the soundtrack, including the theme tune penned by Barry Gibb and songs by fellow Australian songwriter-producer John Farrar. Gibb and Stigwood's production partner Allan Carr convinced Stigwood to bring Frankie Valli on to sing the title track, though Valli distrusted Stigwood for the amount of control he exercised over bands under his tutelage and declined to do any further records for him.

Not all of Stigwood's films were popular. The third film of his Travolta deal, Moment by Moment, which co-starred Lily Tomlin, was panned by critics and is credited with turning Travolta into 'box office poison'. Also in 1978, Sgt. Pepper's Lonely Hearts Club Band, starring the Bee Gees and Peter Frampton, was another critical flop.

But of the 19 singles to hit the top of the Billboard charts in 1978, eight were from RSO. On the US Billboard Hot 100 chart for 25 March 1978, five songs written by the Gibbs were in the US top 10 at the same time: "Night Fever", "Stayin' Alive", "If I Can't Have You", "Emotion" and "Love Is Thicker Than Water". The Bee Gees enjoyed a run of six consecutive number one singles which continued into 1979. RSO records also had success with soundtracks for Fame and The Empire Strikes Back before Stigwood sold the label to Polygram.

It was during this period that writer Steven Gaines , in his New York Sunday News column "Top of the Pop", coined the phrase "velvet mafia" to refer to the Robert Stigwood Organization — the term soon began to be used to describe the influential gay crowd who supposedly ran Hollywood and the fashion industry.

Stigwood set up Associated R&R Films with Rupert Murdoch in 1980, which produced Peter Weir's well-received Gallipoli (1981), but no further films.

Other notable films produced by Stigwood include Times Square (1980); The Fan (1981); Grease 2 (1982); Staying Alive (1983); the 1997 Golden Globe Awards' Best Film winner, Evita, starring Madonna.

=== Later years ===
Stigwood remained active during his later years, primarily in musical theatre, taking a role in stage revivals of Grease and a theatrical adaptation of Saturday Night Fever.

In 2005, he sold the Barton Manor estate on the Isle of Wight, which had been his home for many years.

== Personal life ==
Stigwood was gay.

=== Death ===
Stigwood died in London on 4 January 2016, aged 81.

On his death, one obituary judged that he had been for a time the most powerful tycoon in the entertainment industry: "Stigwood owned the record label that issued his artists' albums and film soundtracks, and he also controlled publishing rights – not since Hollywood's golden days had so much power and wealth been concentrated in the hands of one mogul."

== Legacy ==
The Robert Stigwood Fellowship Program was established in 2014 by the Music Development Office in Adelaide, to provide mentorship and professional development to local musicians and entrepreneurs in the music industry.

== Major productions ==
=== Stage musicals ===
- Hair
- Oh! Calcutta!
- The Dirtiest Show in Town
- Sing a Rude Song
- Jesus Christ Superstar
- Pippin
- John, Paul, George, Ringo ... and Bert
- Evita (winner of the 1980 Tony Award for Best Musical in the US)
- Sweeney Todd: The Demon Barber of Fleet Street
- Saturday Night Fever

=== Films ===
- Jesus Christ Superstar (as co-producer)
- Tommy
- Bugsy Malone (as executive producer)
- Saturday Night Fever
- Grease
- Sgt. Pepper's Lonely Hearts Club Band
- Moment by Moment
- Times Square
- Fame (as soundtrack producer)
- The Empire Strikes Back (as soundtrack producer)
- The Fan
- Gallipoli
- Grease 2
- Staying Alive
- Evita

=== Other ===
- Music for UNICEF Concert (as organiser and executive producer)
