= Robin's Reign =

Studio album by Robin Gibb
- Released: February 1970 (UK); March 1970 (US)
- Recorded: March – October 1969; London, England
- Genre: Baroque pop
- Length: 36:28
- Label: Polydor; Atco (US, Canada)
- Producer: Robin Gibb, Vic Lewis

Robin Gibb studio albums chronology
| Robin's Reign (1970) | How Old Are You? (1983) |

Singles from Robin's Reign
- 1. "Saved by the Bell" Released: 27 June 1969; 2. "August October" Released: February 1970

Robin's Reign is the first solo album by British singer Robin Gibb, a member of the Bee Gees with his brothers Barry and Maurice. Robin had left the group following a disagreement with his brother Barry over who should sing lead vocals. The album was not a commercial success, though it did spawn Gibb's solo hit, "Saved by the Bell" (UK #2). The other songs in the album were produced by Gibb, and the rest was produced with his (then new) manager, Vic Lewis. This album was reissued by RSO Records in 1978 and reissued in 1991 on Spectrum Records. The album had a limited CD release in Germany and was made available digitally on Amazon and Spotify in 2011 and iTunes the following year. Gibb would not release another solo album until 1983.

It was considered a psychedelic pop masterpiece in some circles as Gibb explained: "Sometimes on the BBC they'll play unreleased tracks from that album that even I haven't got." Elton John covered the two songs on the album, "Saved by the Bell" and "August October".

== Background ==
The song chosen as the A-side of the single from the Bee Gees' album Odessa was "First of May" which featured only Barry Gibb with an orchestra. Robin had hoped for the song "Lamplight", a full group performance which featured him on lead vocals, to be the single but in the end it came out on the B-side. Tensions between the three brothers were already high and Robin left the group after this incident, beginning work on Robin's Reign soon afterward. While Gibb was recording Robin's Reign he wrote "Moon Anthem" and "Ghost of Christmas Past" in June 1969. Both tracks were instrumental with the orchestra and choir being arranged by Kenny Clayton. It was credited to 'Robin Gibb Orchestra and Chorus' but the two songs were left unreleased.

== Recording ==
On 19 March 1969, Gibb announced his solo plans, and the same day when the Bee Gees recorded "Tomorrow Tomorrow", "Sun in My Morning" and "Ping Pong" (unreleased), and Gibb began recording later in March, Maurice participated at least in one session, on which he played piano on "Saved by the Bell" and bass on "Mother and Jack", but later, Barry was not happy to hear about it.

Despite Robin's break with the Bee Gees, twin brother Maurice Gibb played bass on the song "Mother and Jack" and piano on "Saved by the Bell", which was recorded around March 1969 with "Alexandria Good Time" and "Janice" but none of the songs was released. Gibb's method of recording was to record himself playing organ accompanied by an electronic drum machine, then a track playing guitar, then added one or more vocal tracks. The demo was then sent to Kenny Clayton, who wrote an orchestral arrangement, adding much detail to Robin's layered tracks. Around September, Gibb signed with Vic Lewis of NEMS. Also in September, Gibb had mentioned about Winston Churchill called "The Statesman", and later in August, he gave the press eleven titles for the forthcoming album called My Own Work.

=== All My Own Work album ===
Gibb originally planned to entitle his first solo album All My Own Work for obvious reasons, and announced that the tracks would be:

1. "Alexandria Good Time"
2. "The Flag I Flew Fell Over"
3. "I'll Herd My Sheep"
4. "The Man Most Likely To Be"
5. "Love Just Goes"
6. "Make Believe"
7. "I Was Your Used to Be"
8. "The Complete and Utter History"
9. "Seven Birds Are Singing"
10. "Sing a Song of Sisters"
11. "Beat the Drum"

But later in August 1969, when he returned to studio to complete work on the album, the title and tracks had changed as he explains, "I've got fifteen tracks in the can for the LP titled Robin's Reign".

Gibb recorded "One Million Years", "The Worst Girl in This Town", "Most of My Life", "Down Came The Sun" and "Hudson's Fallen Wind" (later renamed as "Farmer Ferdinand Hudson"). Gibb's manager Vic Lewis, conducted the orchestra on "Give Me a Smile" and "Weekend". Gibb completed recording for Robin's Reign on 10 October 1969, when he recorded "August October", "Gone Gone Gone" and "Lord Bless All" (10 October was also the day when the Bee Gees recorded "The Chance of Love" for their LP Cucumber Castle.) Mr. Bloe member Zack Lawrence arranged "August October" and "Gone Gone Gone".

In that same interview, Gibb mentioned that he was working on a book, a Christmas special, and two screenplays and musical scores, which other articles of this time identified as an original story called The Family Circle and a musical version of William Shakespeare's Henry VIII.

== Release ==
If I did that it would not be me, would it?, [Bob] Dylan sings in the same way as me. He uses his heart as an instrument. Even I can't understand completely why this works but it does. It's not possible for any artist to jump outside themselves and see themselves for what they are. Even when you look in a mirror you get a reversed image!

– Gibb's interview with The Guardian on the public's reaction on his solo career and songwriting ability

Professional ratings
Review scores
| Source | Rating |
|---|---|
| AllMusic | 3.5/5 stars |

In that same interview, he talks about his inspirations: "Perhaps because I am unduly sensitive, things like the Hither Green rail crash in which I was involved affect me deeply. That had a lasting effect upon me. I saw bodies and people being given the last rites. I'm frightened stiff of death." Gibb is something of a sentimentalist and unashamedly admits to seeing the Julie Andrews' film Mary Poppins: "I love the music they write for Julie, I would love to write a song for her. I tried to get Mary Poppins for my home movie projector, The Sherman Brothers write beautiful songs. Rodgers and Hammerstein, I like all that kind of music."

Gibb spoke of his departure from the Bee Gees: "Music to me is an adventure and I can do far more on my own. It was restricting writing for the Bee Gees but I enjoyed it until they began to judge what I was doing. I'm not going to be judged. O.K. SO I KILLED A MAN, BUT I'M NOT GOING TO BE JUDGED!"

Bruce Eder at AllMusic describes the lyrics in "Most of My Life" as steeped in bitterness. On side one, "August October" and "Gone Gone Gone" could have passed muster on any of the Bee Gees' late 60's albums. "The Worst Girl in This Town" at a sonic level is as great an achievement as a Bee Gees cut. "Down Came The Sun" is a perfect example. "Mother and Jack" is a calypso-flavoured piece that was Gibb's answer to Barry and Maurice's (Bee Gees) "I.O.I.O." This song offered possibilities for a new, leaner, different sound.

The tracks now appear on the posthumous boxed set Saved by the Bell: The Collected Works of Robin Gibb 1968-1970.

== Track listing ==
All tracks are written by Robin Gibb.

Side one
| No. | Title | Length |
|---|---|---|
| 1. | "August October" | 2:31 |
| 2. | "Gone Gone Gone" | 2:35 |
| 3. | "The Worst Girl in This Town" | 4:30 |
| 4. | "Give Me a Smile" | 3:05 |
| 5. | "Down Came the Sun" | 2:45 |
| 6. | "Mother and Jack" | 4:06 |

Side two
| No. | Title | Length |
|---|---|---|
| 1. | "Saved by the Bell" | 3:06 |
| 2. | "Weekend" | 2:10 |
| 3. | "Farmer Ferdinand Hudson" | 3:05 |
| 4. | "Lord Bless All" | 3:15 |
| 5. | "Most of My Life" | 5:12 |

=== 2015 expanded reissue ===
For the track listing of the expanded reissue of Robin's Reign from 2015, see Sing Slowly Sisters#Saved by the Bell: The Complete Works of Robin Gibb: 1968-1970.

== Personnel ==
- Robin Gibb – lead and backing vocals, acoustic guitar, Hammond organ, drum machine
- Maurice Gibb – bass guitar on #6 (side 1), piano on #1 (side 2)
- Kenny Clayton – orchestral arrangements
- Zack Lawrence – orchestral arrangement on #1, 2, 3 (side 1)
- Vic Lewis – conductor
- Hamish Grimes – album artwork
- Ray Washbourne – photographer

== Chart positions ==
| Chart (1970) | Peak position |
|---|---|
| Canadian RPM Albums Chart | 77 |
| West German Media Control Albums Chart | 19 |
