= Terry Winter (singer) =

- Born: Thomas William Standen; May 8, 1941; Brazil
- Died: September 22, 1998 (aged 57)
- Genres: Jovem Guarda, ballad, rock, Brazilian popular music, sertaneja music
- Occupations: singer, composer, guitarist, actor
- Instruments: vocal, guitar
- Years active: 1958–1997
- Labels: Albatroz, Mocambo, RCA Victor, Beverly, EMI-Odeon, New Records, Arcane, Dollar, Copacabana,
- Influences: Burt Bacharach, Bee Gees

Thomas William Standen (born May 8, 1941 – September 22, 1998) was a Brazilian singer-songwriter, better known as Terry Winter. He started singing in the 1960s in Portuguese, under the name Tommy Standen but it was like Terry Winter and performing in English who became himself more famous in Brazil and Latin America, with the hit "Summer Holiday".

== Biography ==
=== Childhood and youth ===
Thomas William Standen was Brazilian and son of the Brazilians Charles Walter Standen and Maria Thereza Standen, but grandson of English citizens. His maternal grandfather was a veterinarian and his grandmother housewife, and they lived in Brazil. He spent most of his childhood at a family farm in Penedo, at the time still part of the municipality of Resende (RJ) and now part of Itatiaia district, where his father was a manager of a business. He studied at an English college, and his family maintained English traditions and customs, including speaking English at home with Portuguese. Prior to his career as a singer in the 1960s, Standen was an English teacher.

=== Early career and success ===
Early in his career, he adopted the stage name Tommy Standen, initially mis-written as Tommy Staden. He was present in the Alegria dos Bairros auditorium program of Rede Excelsior, opening the programs by singing songs in Portuguese. He recorded an EP and a single for small labels until he was hired by RCA. There, he performed as a songwriter, having songs recorded by artists like Nilton César ("Ao Mundo Vou Contar" in 1966), Ronnie Von ("Pequeno Príncipe", partnership with Fred Jorge in 1967) and Dick Danello ("Leylan", in 1969). At the same time, he released his own albums, such as "O Quente" and "A Varanda".

=== Singing in English ===
With the 1969 Tomorrow Tomorrow compact, released by the Beverly label, it begins recording in English. Although this version was overshadowed by the success of the original, Standen decides to change his name and record always in English, now as Terry Winter, thus making himself a foreigner. His first songs under the new pseudonym were "You'll Notice Me" and "Mission to Carry," included in LP New Tonton, a collection of songs by international artists released by the Beverly pavel. In "You'll Notice Me," he uses the pseudonym Bart Baraboskin, references to Burt Bacharach, his musical influence, and his wife, Miriam Baraboskin. This song was released as a single and reached moderate success, which leads him to record his first LP, Terry Winter, 1971, released by New Records.

On New Records, Terry Winter reaches his greatest hits. From the first album, the song "Summer Holiday" becomes one of the biggest hits of 1972 and is also released in other Latin American countries, achieving similar success. Another prominent song from the first album is "Our Love Dream". In the meantime, he secretly records a vinyl by Odeon under the pseudonym Ian Simmons.

After his success, Winter returns to the RCA record label and, in 1975, becomes Brazilian in the Programa Silvio Santos: at the beginning of the interview, presenter Silvio Santos only communicates with the singer through an interpreter, but at the return of the commercial interval, Winter starts to talk with Santos in good Portuguese. According to Winter, he had not revealed his identity before for fear of losing his success. Still in this program, announced that it would change again the stage name, for Thomas Williams, change that did not occur.

Terry Winter also worked as an actor, as in the telenovela A Viagem, by Ivani Ribeiro, produced and screened by Rede Tupi between 1975 and 1976, where he made the character Rui. In 1976, she achieved great success with the song "Our Love", in a duet with Heleninha, which allows her to enter markets like the United States and record an LP in Spanish.

=== Change of course ===
Winter did not get much success as an interpreter in the late 1970s. In the 1980s, he recorded some CDs with Nil Bernardes (using the name Neil Bernard) and Silvia Massari, but without success. He also recorded a last album, also ignored by the media. Parallel to this, in 1982, he adopts a new pseudonym to compose songs in Portuguese, for thinking that Terry Winter was not suitable for this. Like Chico Valente, he created hits in the voices of música sertaneja singers, such as "Sonho de um Caminhoneiro" and "Mãe de Leite" (recorded by Milionário & José Rico), "Filho Pródigo" (by Júnio and Julio), "Convite de Casamento" (recorded by Ataíde and Alexandre), "Meu Velho Amigo" (Tonico & Tinoco) and "Rei do Gado" (opening theme of the telenovela O Rei do Gado). He also composed songs for popular singers such as Gugu Liberato ("Bugaloo Da Da"), Gretchen ("Hula Hula"), Fofão ("Guerra nas Estrelas") and Vanessa ("Doce Alegria"). He then set up his own label, Fascination Edições Musicais S/C Ltda – ME, with Nil Bernardes, businessman Álvaro Gomes and artist Orival Pessini, interpreter of the character Fofão. They produced albums for the sertanejo groups Matogrosso & Mathias, Carlos César & Cristiano and Sisters Galvão, as well as Fofão's albums, from which came hits such as "Guerra nas Estrelas", "Eu Quero Ver" and "Mundo Novo". In 1988, he released the LP Pleasure, which would be the last of his solo career, including songs like "Never Gonna Let You Go", "Energy of Love" and "Music is Power". As a singer, he also participated in festivals singing in the pair Chico Valente and Nil Bernardes. In the Festival Agroceres, exhibited in Rede Bandeirantes in 1987, the song "Coração Caipira" obtained the first place, and was later recorded by Nil Bernardes in its solo disc. The two also participated in the 1st and 2nd Rimula Regional Music Festivals, in 1989 and 1991, shown on SBT; in the first, the song "Chão Vermelho" was among the ten best and was recorded for the LP of the Festival, being the last appearance of Winter like singer; in the second, Nil Bernardes interprets the song "Sinfonia Sertaneja" alone and wins the prize of best interpreter.

=== The last years and death ===
In the 1990s, Terry Winter missed success and was looking for a new label, as he had been putting together several compositions. In 1998, however, bouts of asthmatic bronchitis, a condition he had suffered as a child, became more frequent, until, on an August morning, he went awry and with the delay in the arrival of the rescue, he suffered a stroke. He was taken to an emergency room in the São Paulo district of Butantã and from there he was transferred to a hospital in Jabaquara, where he was admitted to the intensive care unit. The prospects for recovery were good, however, after thirty-two days of hospitalization, contracted pneumonia and died on September 22, 1998, at age 57. He was buried on September 23, 1998, in the Campo Grande cemetery, in the district of Campo Grande. He left four children from his marriage to Miriam Baraboskin: Shannon Mark, Shareenne, Scott Sherman and Shane Morgan.

== Pseudonyms ==
Despite having made more success with the stage name Terry Winter, the singer used several other pseudonyms. As a singer, he performed as Tommy Staden, Tommy Standen, Terry Winter, Ian Simmons and Chico Valente. As a composer, he signed Tommy Standen, Tommy, Bart Baraboskin, Tony Temple, Dell Clyde, Don Paul, Eric Joe Summer, Joe Baker, Kat Karatiev, M. Maulin, Oliver Charles, Tom Morgan and Chico Valente.

== Legacy ==
Terry Winter was especially important for Brazilian music when inaugurating a generation of Brazilian singers who sang in English and used English pseudonyms, and thus obtained success outside Brazil. After Winter came Morris Albert, Dave Maclean, Chrystian, Michael Sullivan, Mark Davis (pseudonym of singer Fábio Júnior, at the beginning of his career), Tony Stevens (pseudonym of singer Jessé) and the Pholhas group.

== Discography ==
=== Terry Winter's Albums ===
| Year | Album |
|---|---|
| 1971 | Terry Winter: Format: LP; Recorder: New Records; Cat. No.: NRLP-205 (1971) / BLP-9043 (1972) |
| 1973 | Terry Winter: Format: LP; Recorder: RCA; Cat. No.: 103.0095 |
| 1974 | Terry Winter: Format: LP; Recorder: RCA; Cat. No.: 103.0123 |
| 1976 | Terry Winter - Everybody Knows That I Love You: Format: LP; Recorder: RCA; Cat. No.: 103.0186 |
| 1977 | Terry Winter - Nuestro Amor (in Spanish): Format: LP; Recorder: RCA; Cat. No.: AVS - 4487 |
| 1979 | Terry Winter - Fiesta de Verano: Format: LP; Recorder: RCA; Cat. No.: A-102 |
| 1979 | Terry Winter: Format: LP; Recorder: PHILIPS / Phonogram; Cat. #: 6349.406 |
| 1988 | Pleasure: Format: LP; Recorder: 3M; Cat. No.: 7M8-0007 |

=== Terry Winter's Compilations ===
- 1980 - Paulo Sérgio (2), Terry Winter - 15 Êxitos
- 1999 - The Essential Of — Terry Winter
- Unknown - Grandes Baladas Del Recuerdo — Terry Winter, Tony Ronald, Paulo Sérgio

=== Singles and EPs ===
==== As Tommy Staden ====
- 1963 - "Maria"/"Regina" "Graças a Você"/"Aventureiro Sonhador"<
- 1965 - "Running from Love"/"Escarcéu"

==== As Tommy Standen ====
- 1966 - "Véspera do Fim do Mundo (Eve of Destruction)"/"Não Brinque com Fogo"
- 1967 - "O Quente"/"Eu Vou Chorar por Você"
- 1967 - "A Varanda"/"Uma Aventura a Más
- 1969 - "Tomorrow Tomorrow"/"Marley Purt Drive"

==== As Terry Winter ====
- 1970 - "You'll Notice Me"/"Mission To Carry"
- 1971 - "Cariño"/"Tu Me Lo Diras"
- 1972 - "Our Love Dream"/"Shadow Dark and Blue"
- 1972 - "Summer Holiday"/"The Whistler"
- 1972 - "Summer Holiday"/"You'll Notice Me"
- 1972 - "Terry Winter"
- 1972 - "I Just Looked at Myself"
- 1972 - "Summer Holiday"/"I Know"
- 1972 - "Nature"/"Pretty Woman"
- 1972 - "I Just Looked At Myself"/"The Idols Have Gone"
- 1972 - "Fiesta de Verano (Summer Holiday)"/"I Just Looked at Myself (Bum Chicka Bum)"/"Descubrirás Que Yo Existo (You'll Notice Me"
- 1972 -"Fiesta de Verano (Summer Holiday)"/"Descubrirás Que Yo Existo (You'll Notice Me)"
- 1972 - "Solamente Me Miro"/"Solamente Me Miro"
- 1972 - "Fiesta De Verano = Summer Holiday"
- 1973 - "Hey Hannah"/"The Band Days Are Over"
- 1973 - "You'll Notice Me"/"Please Leave Me Alone"
- 1973 - "Te Diran De Mi"/"Por Favor Dejame Solo"
- 1974 - "Descubriras Que Existo"/"Mision A Cumplir"
- 1974 - "Love Making"/"Fahrenheit 32"
- 1975 - "Our Love"/"Life Is Like a Cloud"
- 1975 - "It's Been Such A Long Time Baby"/"Like A Stranger"
- 1976 - "Nuestro Amor (Our Love)"/"Por Confiar De Más (Our Love Dream)"
- 1976 - "Terry Winter"
- 1977 - "No Me Dejes Llorar"/"Hazlo Nena"
- 1977 - "Thanks"/"What's Come Over You"
- 1980 - "My Woman"/"Lady Cool"
- 1980 - "Look at Me"/"Sunday Night"
- 1981 - "One More a Fool"/"Something for Someone"
- 1985 - Bob Marley & The Wailers, Terry Winter E Silvia Massari, Lafayette (5) – Oh Lord / Lovely Love / Uni Duni Te / Whisky A Go Go
- 1985 - "Lovely Love" with Silvia Massari/"Happy Now" with Silvia Massari

==== As Ian Simmons ====
- 1972 - "I Think You're the Woman for Me"/"Someone Is Talking"
