= Saved by the Bell (song) =

Single by Robin Gibb

from the album Robin's Reign
- B-side: "Mother and Jack"
- Released: 27 June 1969
- Recorded: March 1969
- Genre: Swamp pop, folk
- Length: 3:20 (single version); 3:06 (album version)
- Label: Polydor (United Kingdom); Atco (United States); Spin (Australia)
- Songwriter: Robin Gibb
- Producer: Robin Gibb

Robin Gibb singles chronology
"Saved by the Bell" (1969)	"One Million Years" (1969)

"Saved by the Bell" is a 1969 single written and recorded by Robin Gibb. It was released in June 1969, and has been certified gold. It was the lead single on Gibb's debut album Robin's Reign, released in early 1970. According to Vinyl Records, the song was co-produced by Kenny Clayton. Gibb also made a promotional video for this song. The song gained commercial success in Europe, but was a commercial failure in the US.

Music critic Nicholas James says: "'Saved by the Bell' falls into this category, being heavily influenced by the Bee Gees track 'I Started a Joke'. It has a powerful Robin Gibb lead vocal and an infectious melody, although the lyrics are somewhat simplistic (possibly even banal)." David Furgess described "Saved by the Bell" as a "killer song".

== Background ==
Gibb announced his solo plans on 19 March 1969, on the same day the Bee Gees recorded "Tomorrow Tomorrow" and two other songs. "Saved by the Bell" was recorded around March 1969 at De Lane Lea Studios, along with three other songs: "Mother and Jack", "Alexandria Good Time", and "Janice". As Gibb said: "I made that record back at the end of March, immediately following my split from the Bee Gees".

Fellow Bee Gee Maurice Gibb worked on "Saved by the Bell", playing piano, adding vocals, and recording organ and guitar, accompanied by a drum machine (this was among the first pop songs to use a drum machine). The demo was then sent to Kenny Clayton, who arranged the song with a big singalong chorus. The orchestra section of the song was arranged by John Fiddy.

== Release ==
"Saved by the Bell" was recorded for Gibb's debut album, Robin's Reign. It was released as a single on 27 June 1969, with "Mother and Jack" as the B-side. On its release, the song competed directly with the Bee Gees' single "Don't Forget to Remember". "Saved by the Bell" rose to number two in the UK Singles Chart, while topping the short-lived British Top Pops newspaper charts. It also hit number one in South Africa, the Netherlands, New Zealand, and Ireland. "Saved by the Bell" held the number-one slot in South Africa for three weeks, in the Netherlands for six weeks, and in New Zealand for 1 week. Other chart positions include #4 in Norway, and #3 in Germany. It didn't fare as well in the US, only reaching #87.

Record World said it was "an outstanding effort, bound to click."

Shortly after the release of "Saved by the Bell", Gibb told The Guardian:

"Everything I write I write to the best of my ability, that is, every song I have written could be a single. I never write A-sides that would be an insult to my ego. "Mother and Jack", on the flip of "Saved by the Bell", could just as well have been an A-side. All the tracks for my first LP could be singles."

== Re-releases ==
"Saved by the Bell" was re-released by Old Gold Records in 1988, with "Words" (Bee Gees) as the B-side. It was re-released in Spain by Polydor as the B-side of "Tomorrow Tomorrow" (Bee Gees). It was included on the compilation The Story of Musikladen No. 2 1976–1980. The song's mono mix was released on the compilation Rare Collection on Polydor Japan, while the stereo version was released in 1990 on the Tales from the Brothers Gibb.

== Performances ==
Gibb performed "Saved by the Bell" in Beat-Club on 2 August 1969. The episode features a segment where Eddie Vickers interviews Gibb. The clip was included on the DVD Beat Club Rebroadcasts Vol. 9 and The Story of Beat-Club Volume 2 1968–1970.

Gibb also performed "Saved by the Bell" in Auckland, New Zealand. As he recalls:

It was quite chaotic because there was a whole lot of people, and not a lot of security. I almost had to climb a tree, it was frightening. It got quite dangerous. The concept of security hadn't crept into the popular arena. It started out as enjoyable, and then the audience got out of hand.

Gibb performed the song in 2005 with The Neue Philharmonie Frankfurt Orchestra.

== Cover versions ==
Notable covers of "Saved by the Bell" include Elton John's version.

== Chart performance ==
Charts (1969)	Peak position
Australian Go-Set Charts	9
Canada RPM Top Singles	44
Danish Singles Chart	1
Dutch Top 40	1
German Media Control Charts	3
Ireland (IRMA)	1
New Zealand RIANZ Charts	1
Norwegian VG-lista Charts	4
South African Singles Chart	1
Top Pop Singles Chart	1
UK Singles Chart	2
Yugoslavian Singles Chart	2
