= I.O.I.O. =

Single by Bee Gees

from the album Cucumber Castle
- B-side: "Sweetheart"
- Released: March 1970 (United Kingdom); April 1970 (United States)
- Recorded: 12 June 1968 and 8 October 1969
- Genre: World music, African-American music, bubblegum
- Length: 2:55
- Label: Polydor (United Kingdom); Atco (United States)
- Songwriters: Barry Gibb, Maurice Gibb
- Producers: Robert Stigwood, Bee Gees

Bee Gees singles chronology
"If Only I Had My Mind on Something Else" (1970)	"I.O.I.O." (1970)	"Lonely Days" (1970)

"I.O.I.O." is a song by the Bee Gees, released on the album Cucumber Castle. It was written by Barry and Maurice Gibb. The song was released as a single in March 1970, and was also one of the highlights of the album. The single was a relative success, mainly on European charts. Its music video is taken from the film Cucumber Castle.

It was a cult favourite of fans, however, and made it onto the compilation Best of Bee Gees, Volume 2.

== Recording ==
The title "I.O.I.O." is derived from the calls on the chorus sung by Maurice accompanied by Colin's drumming, and Barry sings the verses and plays guitar. Former Bee Gees guitarist Vince Melouney was featured, having played the guitar on the song's first session on 12 June 1968 during sessions for Idea, but was not present when the song was finished, as he left the group following the album Odessa. The song's second session was on October 8, 1969 after they had recorded "Twinky" (unreleased) and "The Chance of Love". (Pentangle drummer Terry Cox added drums on the October 8 sessions.) Maurice claimed that the song was not even quite finished, but it still had Barry's guide vocal on it. The song also is notable for being the only Bee Gees A-side single to feature any vocal solos from Maurice Gibb, these comprising the "I.O." chants.

== Musical structure ==
"I.O.I.O."

"I.O.I.O." marked the group's first conscious delving into what is now called 'world music'. According to Robin Gibb, it grew out of Barry's visit to Africa. Maurice Gibb described this as "Barry's African jaunt". This is evident from the percussion break at the song's beginning.

Cash Box stated that the song "introduces a new sound to the act, more tempo and rhythm effectiveness...and a melodic shift that shines a new light on the group." Record World called it "a chant-ballad" that "should score with music lovers everywhere." Bob Stanley describes "I.O.I.O." as "bouncy bubblegum". According to Bee Gees biographers Melinda Bilyeu, Hector Cook and Andrew Môn Hughes, "I.O.I.O." features "a very sparse arrangement indeed, mainly guitar and drums, and it's not obvious how Barry would have bettered the lead."

== Personnel ==
- Barry Gibb — lead and harmony vocals, acoustic guitar
- Maurice Gibb — backing vocals, bass, piano, organ, acoustic guitar
- Vince Melouney — acoustic guitar
- Colin Petersen — drums
- Terry Cox — drums
- Uncredited — percussions

== Charts ==
=== Weekly charts ===
Charts	Peak position
Argentina	7
Australia (Kent Music Report)	14
Brazil	7
Austria (Ö3 Austria Top 40)	2
Belgium (Ultratop 50 Flanders)	9
Canada (RPM Magazine)	63
Denmark	3
Germany (Media Control Charts)	6
Italy (FIMI)	12
Netherlands (Dutch Top 40)	9
New Zealand (Recorded Music NZ)	6
Spain (PROMUSICAE)	6
UK Singles (Official Charts Company)	49
US Billboard Hot 100	94
US Record World	98

=== Year-end charts ===
Chart (1970)	Position
Austria (Ö3 Austria Top 40)	17
Belgium (Ultratop 50 Flanders)	29
Netherlands (Dutch Top 40)	19

== Cover versions ==
- 1971 from La Pandilla as Aio Aio, sung in Spanish.
- In 1972 TV actor Butch Patrick, backed by the band Sugarloaf, released a version produced by Frank Slay.
- American boy band B3 released a cover in 2002, which was a hit in Germany reaching #4 in the German charts and becoming their biggest chart success.
- Also in 2002, the song became a huge hit for South African singer Kurt Darren in an adapted Afrikaans language version called "IO Meisie"
- Mandarin version of the song is covered by S.H.E from their 4th studio album Super Star using the same tune and the "I.O.I.O" chorus. In Taiwanese Mandarin the "I.O.I.O." chorus sounds similar to love me, love me (愛我，愛我).

=== B3 version ===
Weekly charts

Chart (2002)	Peak position
Austria (Ö3 Austria Top 40)	5
Czech Republic (IFPI)	10
Germany (GfK)	4
Switzerland (Schweizer Hitparade)	24

Year-end charts

Chart (2002)	Position
Austria (Ö3 Austria Top 40)	26
Europe (Eurochart Hot 100)	90
Germany (Official German Charts)	9
