= One Million Years =

Single by Robin Gibb
- B-side: "Weekend"
- Released: November 1969; October 1969 (Germany)
- Recorded: September 1969
- Genre: Baroque pop
- Length: 4:05
- Label: Polydor (United Kingdom); Atco (United States)
- Songwriter(s): Robin Gibb
- Producer(s): Robin Gibb, Vic Lewis

Robin Gibb singles chronology
"Saved by the Bell" (1969)	"One Million Years" (1969)	"August October" (1970)

"One Million Years" is a single released by Robin Gibb in 1969 with the B-side "Weekend". The single did not chart in Britain. Recorded during sessions for Robin's Reign it was only included on the German LP and CD version as the last track. Produced by Gibb with his new manager Vic Lewis. Kenny Clayton conducts the orchestra for this song.

It reached #5 in Germany and #8 in Austria. The song only features a guitar and orchestra. Gibb sings an Italian language of "One Million Years", the name was changed to "Un Million de Ani", but that version was not released. The song's mixed version was released on I've Gotta Get a Message to You (1974).

A promotional video was shown on French television in 1969.

== Background ==
It was recorded around September 1969 with "The Worst Girl in This Town", "Most of My Life", "Down Came The Sun" and "Hudson's Fallen Wind" (later renamed as "Farmer Ferdinand Hudson"). The song's structure has a slow acoustic guitar rhythm playing to a mellow drum pattern. The lyric is intriguing but lacks both the orchestral grandeur and brevity of "Saved by the Bell". Gibb was still making separate mono mixes, so the mono mix, or electronically channeled versions of it, appeared on a few collections until 1974 when a true stereo mix was made for Gotta Get a Message to You. That mix has a different or partially different lead vocal, most easily distinguished in the second verse with I shall stand in mono but I will stand in stereo. Gibb also recorded an alternate vocal track for the song in Italian.

Gibb's vocals on "One Million Years" is high especially on the chorus: I will wait for you yeah, Your eyes will shine like dew Yeah, I close my eyes and you're now here And I'll wait for you. The line i close my eyes was the same title on the Bee Gees' 1967 song which was included on Bee Gees' 1st. Yeah appeared in the chorus two times.
