= August October =

Single by Robin Gibb

from the album Robin's Reign
- B-side: "Give Me a Smile"
- Released: February 1970
- Recorded: 10 October 1969
- Genre: Baroque pop
- Length: 2:31
- Label: Polydor (United Kingdom); Atco (United States)
- Songwriter: Robin Gibb
- Producers: Robin Gibb, Vic Lewis

Robin Gibb singles chronology
"One Million Years" (1969)	"August October" (1970)	"Oh! Darling" (1978)

"August October" is a song written and performed by English singer-songwriter Robin Gibb, the second and the last song released from the album Robin's Reign. It reached No. 45 in the UK in three weeks. It was also charted in other countries like Germany (#12), New Zealand (#11) and in Denmark (#3). It was backed by "Give Me a Smile", a song also appeared on his debut album. It was released as a single in February 1970, same month on which the album was released. It was later covered by Elton John.

== Recording and release ==
"August October" was recorded at London in 10 October 1969 same day as "Gone Gone Gone" and "Lord Bless All". Gibb's voice on this song was low, especially on the first verse: Autumn and Friday the winds blew, July, September, I knew you, and now I sit on the sand hill, I sing our song to the sea.

The Italian LP Best of Bee Gees, Volume 2 has a mono mix of this song with a fadeout ending (at 2:25), but then it comes to a full ending seconds later. If this was to be a true mono mix, it was hardly used, as most Polydor divisions issued stereo singles, and Atco's mono single appears to be a reduction from stereo. Additionally, for the second time Gibb recorded an Italian alternate vocal.

== Chart performance ==
Charts	Peak position
United Kingdom Singles Chart	45
German Media Control Charts	12
Danish Singles Chart	3
New Zealand RIANZ Charts	11
