= The Lord (song) =

Single by Bee Gees

from the album Cucumber Castle
- A-side: "Don't Forget to Remember"
- Released: August 1969
- Recorded: July 1969
- Genre: Country rock, folk rock
- Length: 2:19
- Label: Polydor (United Kingdom); Atco (United States)
- Songwriter(s): Barry Gibb, Maurice Gibb
- Producer(s): Robert Stigwood, Bee Gees

Bee Gees flipsides singles chronology
"Sun in My Morning" (1969)	"The Lord" (1969)	"Sweetheart" (1970)

"The Lord" is a song by the Bee Gees. It was released as the B-side of "Don't Forget to Remember" in August 1969 and later included on Cucumber Castle in early 1970.

== Background ==
Written by Barry and Maurice Gibb, "The Lord" is written in the style of a country gospel track with a fast-picked guitar introduction and a lyric looking forward to an eternity in Heaven and pledging to believe in The Lord till death. As none of the Gibb brothers ever professed to be Christians, it would seem that here they are aping a style rather than expressing their own beliefs. The opening chord was D, the chords at first and second verse was D and A, the chords on chorus was G, D, A7, A and D. The music video for the song was taken on the film Cucumber Castle. "The Lord" was released as a B-side of "Don't Forget to Remember" in August 1969, but in Canada, "I Lay Down and Die" was the B-side. On the intro, someone says a Play you a song.

== Recording ==
"The Lord" was recorded around July 1969 in IBC Studios in London during the same sessions as "Then You Left Me", "I Was the Child", the "Cucumber Castle Theme" and the unreleased tracks "Every Time I See You Smile" and "There Goes My Heart Again". The July 1969 sessions were the last session with drummer Colin Petersen who was fired from the band in August.

== Personnel ==
- Barry Gibb — lead, harmony and backing vocals, acoustic guitar
- Maurice Gibb — harmony and backing vocals, acoustic and bass guitar
- Colin Petersen — drums
