= Sweetheart (Bee Gees song) =

Single by Bee Gees

from the album Cucumber Castle
- A-side: "I.O.I.O." (UK); "If I Only Had My Mind on Something Else" (US)
- Released: March 1970
- Recorded: 26 September 1969; IBC Studios, London
- Genre: Country
- Length: 3:09
- Label: Polydor (UK); Atco (US)
- Songwriters: Barry Gibb, Maurice Gibb
- Producers: Robert Stigwood, Bee Gees

Bee Gees flipsides singles chronology
"The Lord" (1969)	"Sweetheart" (1970)	"Man for All Seasons" (1970)

"Sweetheart"

Single by Engelbert Humperdinck

from the album Sweetheart
- B-side: "Born to Be Wanted"
- Released: 1970
- Genre: Traditional pop, easy listening
- Label: Decca
- Producer: Peter Sullivan

Engelbert Humperdinck singles chronology
"My Marie" (1970)	"Sweetheart" (1970)	"When There's No You" (1971)

"Sweetheart" is a song released by the Bee Gees, released as the B-side of "I.O.I.O." in March 1970. and released on the album Cucumber Castle in April 1970.

== Recording ==
The song was written by Barry and Maurice Gibb, and featured Barry Gibb on lead vocal. Violins are featured in this song, but the musicians who played theme were not credited. The song was recorded on September 26, 1969. Barry Gibb only sings and play guitar on the song's demo.

It was one of the tracks featuring Terry Cox on drums following the departure of Bee Gees' original drummer Colin Petersen.

== Personnel ==
- Barry Gibb — lead and harmony vocal, acoustic guitar
- Maurice Gibb — backing vocal, bass and acoustic guitar, piano
- Terry Cox — drums
- Uncredited — violins, orchestral arrangement

== Engelbert Humperdinck version ==
The song was later recorded by Engelbert Humperdinck and released as a single, and its flipside was "Born to Be Wanted" on Decca Records in UK, Germany and Belgium, on Parrot Records in US and Jugoton Recordsin Yugoslavia. The song was released on his album Sweetheart.

=== Chart performance ===
Chart (1970)	Peak position
Canada Adult Contemporary (RPM)	7
Canada (RPM)	34
UK Singles (Official Charts Company)	22
U.S. Billboard Easy Listening Charts	2
U.S. Billboard Hot 100	47

== Other versions ==
Alan Caddy Orchestra and Singers covered "Sweetheart" in 1970 and released on 6 Top Hits and Tribute to Engelbert Humperdinck. Top of the Pops released this song for Top of the Pops, Volume 13 in September 1970 on Hallmark Records. American singer and actor Dean Martin recorded his version also in 1970 and included on For the Good Times.
