= If Only I Had My Mind on Something Else =

Single by Bee Gees

from the album Cucumber Castle
- B-side: "Sweetheart"
- Released: March 1970 (US)
- Recorded: 25 September 1969
- Genre: Easy listening, Baroque pop
- Length: 2:33
- Label: Polydor (United Kingdom); Atco (United States)
- Songwriters: Barry Gibb, Maurice Gibb
- Producers: Robert Stigwood, Bee Gees

Bee Gees singles chronology
"Don't Forget to Remember" (1969)	"If Only I Had My Mind on Something Else" (1970)	"I.O.I.O." (1970)

Audio sample
- "If Only I Had My Mind On Something Else": file; help

"If Only I Had My Mind on Something Else" is a pop ballad recorded by the Bee Gees. It was written by Barry and Maurice Gibb. It was the first track on the album Cucumber Castle. A remastered version was released in 1990 on Tales from the Brothers Gibb.

== Recording ==
"If Only I Had My Mind on Something Else" was recorded on 25 September 1969 at the IBC Studios in London, same day as "High and Windy Mountain" and "One Bad Thing". On the next day (September 26) they recorded two new songs that was intended for the album "Turning Tide" and "Sweetheart".

== Release and aftermath ==
The song was released in the US as the follow-up to "Don't Forget to Remember" but it failed to make any impact and stalled at #91.

Cash Box said "Splendid ballad side that comes out fresh, rather than a parody of the original Bee Gees. This stunning performance, both vocal and instrumental, and a less obscure lyric should take the team back into the good graces of the teens with explosive sales results." Billboard called it a "strong rhythm ballad loaded with commercial appeal" and a "top vocal performance and string arrangement."

Following this, Barry and Maurice went their separate ways, both releasing solo singles with limited success. Barry and Robin reconciled in the summer of 1970 and the Bee Gees reunited later that year.

== Personnel ==
- Barry Gibb — lead and harmony vocal, guitar
- Maurice Gibb — bass, piano, guitar
- Terry Cox — drums
- Uncredited — strings and orchestra arrangement

== Chart performance ==
Chart (1970)	Peak position
US Billboard Hot 100	91
US Cash Box	76
US Record World	76
CAN RPM	52
