= Never Say Never Again (song) =

Song by Bee Gees

from the album Odessa
- Released: March 1969
- Recorded: October 1968
- Length: 3:28
- Label: Polydor (United Kingdom); Atco (United States)
- Songwriter: Barry, Robin & Maurice Gibb
- Producers: Robert Stigwood, Bee Gees

"Never Say Never Again" is a song by the Bee Gees, It was written by Barry, Robin & Maurice Gibb in 1968 and released on the album Odessa in 1969.

== Writing and recording ==
Robin recalled that he wanted to write a song with the line, 'I declared war on Spain. According to Robin: "Instead, Barry wanted something so normal it was ridiculous. He said my words were so unromantic. But what could be more normal than a man in love wanting to declare war on anything that was to him unlovely?".

Unlike the other songs on the album, this song was recorded quickly. The Sketches for Odessa disc, released with the album's 2009 remastered edition, has an alternate mono mix from December 7, 1968, with a distorted electric guitar part that is not on the multitrack master and a different lead vocal take.

== Reception ==
BBC review highlighted "Never Say Never Again" as the representation for the album's "wavering, self-conscious grasp at some kind of proto-concept", seen in the ambiguous lyrics like "You said Goodbye/I declared war on Spain".

== Personnel ==
- Barry Gibb — lead and harmony vocal, guitar
- Robin Gibb - harmony vocal
- Maurice Gibb — bass, guitar, piano, harmony vocal
- Colin Petersen — drums
- Bill Shepherd — orchestral arrangement

== Cover versions ==
- Tangerine Peel covered "Never Say Never Again" released it as a single on MGM Records.
