= First of May (Bee Gees song) =

Single by The Bee Gees

from the album Odessa
- B-side: "Lamplight"
- Released: January 1969; March 1969 (United States)
- Recorded: November 1968
- Genre: Pop
- Length: 2:49
- Label: Polydor; Atco (United States/Canada)
- Songwriter: Barry, Robin & Maurice Gibb
- Producers: Robert Stigwood, Bee Gees

The Bee Gees singles chronology
| "I Started a Joke" (1968) | "First of May" (1969) | "Tomorrow Tomorrow" (1969) |

Audio sample
- First Of May: file; help

"First of May" is a song by the Bee Gees with lead vocals by Barry Gibb, released as a single from their 1969 double album Odessa. Its B-side was "Lamplight". It also featured as the B-side of "Melody Fair" when that song was released as a single in the Far East in 1971 as well as in 1976 and 1980 on RSO Records. It was the first Bee Gees single to be released after lead guitarist Vince Melouney had left the group.

== Origin and recording ==
The song was first recorded in Atlantic Studios in New York and was continued in IBC Studios, London. Barry said in the booklet with Tales from the Brothers Gibb that the title of the song came from the birthday of his dog, Barnaby. Maurice recalled the session in which that song came about. "Barry and I were sitting at the piano", he said, "And I started playing the chords, and Barry started singing, 'When I was small and Christmas trees were tall' and I started singing along with it. We put a demo down with a vocal and we kept the piano track. Went back to England, and went into IBC Studios in London, added onto that piano track and Barry's vocal stayed on as well. We had a choir and an orchestra all on this one piano". This song was initially taped in demo form in New York City on 16 August 1968.

The orchestral arrangement from maestro Bill Shepherd was featured on the second chorus. The song starts with a piano on the first verse and chorus. Shepherd's orchestra is featured in the second verse and second chorus. After singing the second chorus, the singer repeats the first verse. The music stops when he sings "Don't ask me why, but time has passed us by, Someone else moved in from far away".

== Aftermath ==
The flip side of the single was "Lamplight" on which Robin Gibb sang the lead. Robert Stigwood, the Bee Gees manager chose "First of May" for the A-side. No other singles were released from the Odessa album, as Robin Gibb already had left the group. The song was partially responsible for Robin's brief departure from the Bee Gees, because he had wanted his song, "Lamplight," to be the album's first single, while Barry preferred "First of May." In the end, Barry's judgment won, relegating "Lamplight" to the B-side and as a result Robin quit the band, but he returned a year later. "First of May" debuted at #55 in Cash Box magazine charts the week of March 22nd 1969. Cash Box described it as a "low-key love ballad with the same mystic quality that has proved captivating in the team's work" with "hypnotic arrangements" and a "singular vocal sound." Billboard called it a "big production ballad performance with compelling lyric line."

After its release, "First of May" enjoyed a resurgence several times. In 1971, the song was featured in the soundtrack to Melody, a British motion picture about two children in love. In 1996, the song was used as a theme of the Japanese drama Wakaba no Koro. The song was consequently reissued as a CD single in Japan, also featuring "How Deep Is Your Love" and peaked at No 25, selling more than 100,000 copies.

== Later renditions by group members ==
Although the originally released version was basically just Barry Gibb's vocal backed with Bill Shepherd's orchestral arrangement, the other two credited writers would later appear performing the song. Maurice Gibb sang the song in duet with his former wife Lulu on her 2002 TV special An Audience with Lulu, while Robin Gibb guested on G4's cover of the song, released on G4 & Friends in 2005. This version was also released as a single.

== Charts ==
=== Weekly charts ===
| Chart (1969) | Peak position |
|---|---|
| Australia (Kent Music Report) | 15 |
| Austria (Ö3 Austria Top 40) | 10 |
| Belgium (Ultratop 50 Flanders) | 7 |
| Canada Top Singles (RPM) | 14 |
| Finland (Soumen Virallinen) | 35 |
| France (SNEP) | 18 |
| Germany (Media Control Charts) | 3 |
| Ireland (IRMA) | 4 |
| Italy (FIMI) | 22 |
| Netherlands (Singles Top 100) | 1 |
| New Zealand (Recorded Music NZ) | 4 |
| Norway (VG-lista) | 9 |
| South Africa (Springbok Radio) | 4 |
| Spain (PROMUSICAE) | 20 |
| Switzerland (Swiss Hitparade) | 4 |
| UK Singles (Official Charts Company) | 6 |
| US Billboard Hot 100 | 37 |
| US Cash Box | 18 |
| US Record World | 16 |

| Year | Chart | Peak position |
|---|---|---|
| 1996 | Japanese Singles Chart (Oricon) | 25 |

| Chart (2024) | Peak position |
|---|---|
| Japan Hot Overseas (Billboard Japan) | 13 |

=== Year-end charts ===
| Chart (1969) | Position |
|---|---|
| Austria (Ö3 Austria Top 40) | 17 |
| Belgium (Ultratop) | 16 |
| Netherlands (Singles Top 100) | 16 |
| Norway (VG-lista) | 9 |
| Switzerland (Swiss Hitparade) | 8 |

== Certifications and sales ==
| Region | Certification | Certified units/sales |
|---|---|---|
| Japan (RIAJ) | 2× Platinum | 200,000^{^} |
^{^} Shipments figures based on certification alone.
