= Black Diamond (Bee Gees song) =

Song by Bee Gees

from the album Odessa
- Released: March 1969 (UK); January 1969 (US)
- Recorded: October 1968 at IBC Studios, London
- Genre: Baroque pop
- Length: 3:27 4:00 (demo version)
- Label: Polydor Records (UK); Atco Records (US)
- Songwriter(s): Barry, Robin & Maurice Gibb
- Producer(s): Robert Stigwood, Bee Gees

"Black Diamond" is a song by the Bee Gees released on the album Odessa in 1969. The song was written by Barry, Robin & Maurice Gibb and featured lead vocals by Robin Gibb. It was included on the compilation Marley Purt Drive released in 1970.

== Recording ==
This track was the first song recorded when the Bee Gees returned to England after initial sessions for the album in New York City, and was the first song not to feature lead guitarist Vince Melouney who had left after the New York sessions for the album. It was recorded twice, the first version ended to 4:00 was released on Sketches for Odessa in 2006. and the second version was released on the album. The intro features a guitar part played by Maurice, and the orchestral arrangement by Bill Shepherd. Barry Gibb did not feature on the demo version. The beginning of the song is similar but there are some vastly different lyrics in the verses.

Robin Gibb would return to the same lyrical theme for the song Diamonds on his 1984 album Secret Agent.

== Personnel ==
- Robin Gibb – lead and harmony, piano, mellotron
- Barry Gibb – guitar, backing vocal
- Maurice Gibb – bass, piano, guitar, mellotron, backing vocal
- Colin Petersen – drums
