= Cucumber Castle (film) =

1970 British comedy film by Hugh Gladwish

- Opening titles
- Written by: Barry Gibb; Maurice Gibb
- Directed by: Hugh Gladwish
- Starring: Barry Gibb; Maurice Gibb; Eleanor Bron; Frankie Howerd
- Theme music composer: Bee Gees
- Country of origin: United Kingdom
- Original language: English

Production
- Producer: Mike Mansfield
- Cinematography: Ben Knoll
- Running time: 60 minutes

Original release
- Network: BBC2
- Release: 26 December 1970

Cucumber Castle is a 1970 British comedy film made for television directed by Hugh Gladwish and starring the Bee Gees, Eleanor Bron and Frankie Howerd. It aired on BBC2 on 26 December 1970.

The film's title is taken from a song of the same name featured on the album Bee Gees' 1st in 1967 although the song's lyrical content bears no relation to the film script except for the titular castle.

== Plot ==
The plot revolves around two heirs, Prince Frederick and his brother Prince Marmaduke, and their dying father. On his death bed, the King orders his kingdom divided into two halves, the Kingdom of Jelly and the Kingdom of Cucumbers. Before the king dies, Prince Frederick declares himself the "King of Cucumber" and Prince Marmaduke becomes the "King of Jelly". The film intersperses comedy sketches with Bee Gees songs plus performances by Lulu and Blind Faith with several cameo appearances. At the end, the king changes his mind and comes back, saying "I think those pills are working".

== Cast ==
- Peter Blythe as narrator
- Eleanor Bron as Lady Margerie Pee
- Pat Coombs as Nurse Sarah Charles Bottom
- Barry Gibb as Prince Frederick, King of Cucumber
- Maurice Gibb as Prince Marmaduke, King of Jelly
- Frankie Howerd as dying king
- Lulu as Lulu the cook
- Spike Milligan as the court jester
- Julian Orchard as Julian the Lord Chamberlaine
- Vincent Price as Wicked Count Voxville
- Blind Faith as themselves
  - Eric Clapton
  - Ric Grech
  - Steve Winwood
  - Ginger Baker
- Roger Daltrey as himself (uncredited)
- Donovan as himself (uncredited)
- Marianne Faithfull as herself (uncredited)
- Mick Jagger as himself (uncredited)

== History ==
By the time filming began in 1969, the Bee Gees were down to a trio consisting of Barry and Maurice Gibb and the drummer Colin Petersen. Robin Gibb had quit the group earlier in the year following the release of the group's sixth album Odessa. Songs for the film were recorded during the summer of 1969 with Petersen on drums, but when filming began, he was fired from the group. His scenes from the film were cut and he is not credited on the accompanying album, though he does play on some songs.

== Soundtrack ==
1. "Don't Forget to Remember" by the Bee Gees
2. "Then You Left Me" by the Bee Gees
3. "I Was the Child" by the Bee Gees
4. "The Lord" by the Bee Gees
5. "My Thing" by the Bee Gees
6. "Morning of My Life" by Lulu
7. "Mrs. Robinson" by Lulu
8. "Well All Right" by Blind Faith

The five Bee Gees' songs appeared on the album Cucumber Castle released earlier the same year.

An orchestral version of the original Cucumber Castle song plays over the opening credits. The end titles feature a similarly orchestral version of the earlier Bee Gees track Holiday.

The footage of Blind Faith and the likes of Mick Jagger in the crowd were taken from Blind Faith's Hyde Park performance in 1969.

== Home media ==
The title was briefly released in the U.S. in the early days of home video by the tiny label Video Tape Network, but quickly disappeared from sale. The tape was once cited by Video Review magazine as the rarest commercial release ever, and copies have fetched three figures on the collector's market. It has never since been officially released on home video in any form, though bootlegs have circulated for years.
