= Cucumber Castle =

Studio album by the Bee Gees
- Released: April 1970
- Recorded: 7 May – 26 September 1969 (except "I.O.I.O", 12 June 1968 and 8 October 1969)
- Studio: IBC (London)
- Genres: Folk rock, country folk
- Length: 35:47
- Labels: Polydor; Atco (United States, Canada)
- Producers: Robert Stigwood, Bee Gees

The Bee Gees chronology
Odessa (1969)	Cucumber Castle (1970)	2 Years On (1970)

Singles from Cucumber Castle
- 1. "Don't Forget to Remember" Released: August 1969; 2. "If Only I Had My Mind on Something Else" Released: March 1970 (United States); 3. "I.O.I.O." Released: March 1970

Professional ratings
Review scores
Source	Rating
AllMusic	3.5/5 stars
The Rolling Stone Album Guide	1.5/5 stars

Cucumber Castle is the seventh studio album by the Bee Gees, released in April 1970. It was produced by Barry Gibb, Maurice Gibb, and Robert Stigwood. It consists of songs from their television special of the same name, which was named after a song on their 1967 album Bee Gees' 1st. Cucumber Castle is the only Bee Gees album not to feature any recorded contributions from Robin Gibb, as he had left the group before the album was recorded. (He did receive co-composer credit on one track, which was written before his departure.)

Cucumber Castle was the last Bee Gees album with drummer Colin Petersen, who was fired during the recording of the album. Pentangle drummer Terry Cox played on the remaining tracks.

This album contained the hit single "Don't Forget to Remember" which hit No. 2 in the UK in August 1969, going virtually head to head with Robin Gibb's solo single "Saved by the Bell", which had reached number No. 2 the previous month. The album struggled to make an impact and stalled at number 57 in the UK and number 94 in the US. Indeed, it was the last Bee Gees album to chart in the UK until Spirits Having Flown in 1979 (though the soundtrack for Saturday Night Fever, which featured six contributions from the group as well as two additional songs that they wrote that other artists performed, topped the UK album chart in 1978).

== Background ==
On 19 March 1969, Robin Gibb announced his solo career, while the Bee Gees recorded three songs "Tomorrow Tomorrow", "Sun in My Morning" and "Ping Pong" (unreleased). Maurice recalls,

"Since Robin left, Barry and I are a lot closer, we're working much more together. We're having a ball, we can bring anyone we like into things. I did the majority of the backings anyway, even when Robin was with us, but there's more work for me now. I'm bringing me out more – I do six leads on the next album; before I think I only sang three all told. I write soft, and Barry keeps telling me to write harder music. I'm progressing more to the arranging side and Barry is getting more ideas-wise, he's freer with his words. At the moment, we'll go on as a three-piece [group], and if we find someone suitable to take Robin's place, we'll take him in, we've only seen two people. We're getting tapes from Wapping and Nottingham and Stoke and all over, but we want to get someone who can sing nice. We can take care of the hair and the clothes and all that. We're not looking for a copy of Robin though".

== Production ==
On 7 May 1969, the Bee Gees recorded "Don't Forget to Remember". The other songs recorded around May were "I Lay Down and Die", "Give a Hand, Take a Hand" (not released at the time but recorded by the Staple Singers in 1971 and re-recorded by the reformed Bee Gees for the 1974 album Mr. Natural) and "Bury Me Down By the River". At the time the band was considering a replacement for Robin. As Dave Dee recalls, "[Barry] was looking for a replacement and I found him one, A guy called Peter Mason, he was a Scouser, but he lived in Salisbury where we lived. Barry was looking for somebody who had a similar voice sound but also wrote". Peter Mason did audition and recorded vocals on a few of the songs to be included on the Cucumber Castle album but those were either erased or left out of the final mix. Mason is unable to verify if his voice is on "Don't Forget to Remember". Mason believes that it was Robert Stigwood wanting to reunite the three brothers that kept him from joining the Bee Gees, in spite of the fact that Barry had welcomed him on board and even bought him a suit for performing in.

In June, Barry produced "The Love of a Woman" and "Don't Let It Happen Again" performed by Samantha Sang, the orchestral arrangement was credited to Bill Shepherd. Also in that month, Barry produced P.P. Arnold's version of "Give a Hand, Take a Hand", around the same time, the Bee Gees recorded the unreleased "Between the Laughter and the Tears". On 13 June, Maurice produced Tin Tin's "Tuesday Dreamer", "Swans on the Canal" and "Spanish Shepherd", . On 9 July 1969, Barry produced P.P. Arnold's version of "Bury Me Down By the River" and "Let There Be Love". Also in July, the Bee Gees continued recording eight songs for the film of the same name. Filming started on 11 August 1969. Also on July, Maurice played all the instruments on the song "My Thing", which was sung by him. In August 1969, Maurice Gibb, Steve Groves, Steve Kipner and Billy Lawrie recorded "Have You Heard the Word" under the name The Fut. The song was released as a single in 1970.

The Bee Gees returned to the studio in September 1969 to record seven songs including the unreleased "One Bad Thing" and "The Day Your Eyes Meet Mine". Both songs were later re-recorded for what was intended to be Barry's debut solo album The Kid's No Good. In October, the Bee Gees recorded two songs, around the same time as they re-recorded "I.O.I.O.", a song from 1968. On 16 October, the last album session, they recorded the unreleased track "Julia", which was sung by Maurice. On 31 October, Gibb produced the two Samantha Sang songs and on November, Gibb produced P.P. Arnold songs "Piccaninny", "High and Windy Mountain" and a cover version of "Turning Tide". Also in November, Gibb produced Tin Tin's three songs.

During much of this time, Maurice Gibb was also producing the debut album by Australian duo Tin Tin.

Shortly after Petersen's departure, Barry reminded everyone, "Maurice is capable of playing about seven instruments - most of the back tracks on the records were all him, and I sang lead on four or five of the hit singles. So how can the Bee Gees sound be finished?". Nevertheless, Barry and Maurice drifted apart shortly afterwards and both recorded unreleased solo albums. The brothers reunited as a trio in 1970.

== Recording and release ==
Around the same time in 1969, Barry and Maurice planned a series of performances as a gratitude to their fans who had supported the Bee Gees through all the tumult as Barry reveals, "We want to go out on a concert tour of Britain before Christmas with a big orchestra". But on 1 December 1969, Barry announced his departure from the band saying "As from today, I'm solo" while Maurice recorded songs for his debut solo album The Loner. Barry spent the following months writing new material for his solo album, The Kid's No Good.

By February 1970, Barry started to record songs for the album. He continued it in March, while Maurice continued working with Billy Lawrie. In April 1970, Maurice recorded "Leave Me Here to Linger with the Ladies" for Sing a Rude Song. Also in April, Barry continued to produce songs for P.P. Arnold. The last day on which P.P. Arnold recorded his song, which was produced by Barry was on 10 June 1970. Cucumber Castle was released around April 1970.

Cucumber Castle reached No. 9 in Italy behind Led Zeppelin II by Led Zeppelin (#7) and McCartney by Paul McCartney (#8), the number one LP at that time was The Beatles' Let It Be.

== Track listing ==
All songs written by Barry and Maurice Gibb except "Turning Tide" by Barry and Robin Gibb.

Side one
No.	Title	Lead vocal(s)	Length
1.	"If Only I Had My Mind on Something Else"	Barry	2:33
2.	"I.O.I.O."	Barry and Maurice	2:51
3.	"Then You Left Me"	Barry	3:11
4.	"The Lord"	Barry	2:19
5.	"I Was the Child"	Barry	3:14
6.	"I Lay Down and Die"	Barry	3:34

Side two
No.	Title	Lead vocal(s)	Length
1.	"Sweetheart"	Barry and Maurice	3:09
2.	"Bury Me Down by the River"	Barry	3:25
3.	"My Thing"	Maurice	2:20
4.	"The Chance of Love"	Barry	2:29
5.	"Turning Tide"	Barry	3:09
6.	"Don't Forget to Remember"	Barry	3:27

== Personnel ==
Credits from Bee Gees historian and sessionographer Joseph Brennan.

Bee Gees

- Barry Gibb – lead, harmony, and backing vocals; rhythm guitar
- Maurice Gibb – harmony and backing vocals, bass, lead and rhythm guitars, piano, organ, Mellotron, drums on "My Thing", lead vocals on "I.O.I.O.", "Sweetheart", and "My Thing"
- Colin Petersen – drums (except "If Only I Had My Mind on Something Else", "Sweetheart", "The Chance of Love", "Turning Tide", and "My Thing")
- Vince Melouney – rhythm guitar on "I.O.I.O."

Additional musicians and production staff

- Peter Mason – harmony vocals on "Don't Forget to Remember" (possibly erased from the final recording or not included in final mix)
- P.P. Arnold – harmony and backing vocals on "Bury Me Down by the River" (uncertain)
- Terry Cox – drums on "If Only I Had My Mind on Something Else", "Sweetheart", "The Chance of Love", and "Turning Tide"
- Robert Stigwood – producer
- Bee Gees – producers
- Uncredited – orchestral and string arrangements
- unknown – orchestra members, audio engineers

== Charts ==
=== Weekly charts ===
Chart	Position
Australian Kent Music Report Chart	10
Canadian RPM Albums Chart	37
Italian Albums Chart	7
UK Albums Chart	57
US Billboard 200	94
West German Media Control Albums Chart	36

=== Year-end charts ===
Chart (1970)	Position
Italian Albums Chart	9
