= Bury Me Down by the River =

1969 single by P. P. Arnold

"Bury Me Down By the River"

Single by P.P. Arnold
- B-side: "Give a Hand, Take a Hand"
- Released: September 1969 (UK)
- Genre: Easy listening
- Length: 3:33
- Label: Polydor (UK); Atlantic (US)
- Songwriters: Barry Gibb, Maurice Gibb
- Producer: Barry Gibb

P.P. Arnold singles chronology
"Angel of the Morning" (1968)	"Bury Me Down By the River" (1969)	"Electric Dreams" (1984)

"Bury Me Down By the River" is a song written by Barry and Maurice Gibb and recorded separately by the Bee Gees and P.P. Arnold. The Bee Gees' version was recorded in May 1969 at IBC Studios and released in April 1970 on the album Cucumber Castle.

Brenda Patterson released a cover of the song on her self-titled album in 1973. Scottish singer Lulu recorded this song on 11 November 1970 with Tommy McClure on bass, Charlie Freeman on guitar, arranged by Arif Mardin, and was produced by Tom Dowd, mixed by Brian Kehew and Bill Inglot which was not released until 12 November 2007 when Rhino Records reissued and remastered it.

== P.P. Arnold version ==
Arnold's version, recorded in the same studio, was released as a single on November 14, 1969 in Germany and in September elsewhere on Polydor and Atlantic Records. Its B-side was "Give a Hand, Take a Hand", also written by Barry and Maurice (the Bee Gees' would not release a version of the song until the Mr. Natural album in 1974.) After Arnold recorded the song, she recorded the Bee Gees' 1968 song "Let There Be Love", but it was not released.

The song also featured on Arnold's compilation album Hit History.

Personnel

- P.P. Arnold — vocals
- Bill Shepherd — orchestral arrangement
- Uncredited — bass, drums, guitar, piano
- Barry Gibb — producer

== Bee Gees' version ==
"Bury Me Down By the River"

Song by Bee Gees

from the album Cucumber Castle
- Released: March 1970
- Recorded: May 1969
- Studio: IBC, London
- Genre: Country; folk; gospel
- Length: 3:25
- Label: Polydor (UK); Atco (US)
- Songwriters: Barry Gibb; Maurice Gibb
- Producers: Robert Stigwood; Bee Gees

The Bee Gees' version was sung by Barry Gibb and appeared on the group's seventh album Cucumber Castle, released in April 1970. Maurice Gibb told NME that the group recorded "Bury Me Down By the River" as possibly the group's next single, but the song would instead become a single by P.P. Arnold. This track was recorded in May 1969 in IBC Studios and was produced by Robert Stigwood, Barry Gibb and Maurice Gibb. Their version was included on numerous compilations such as Stars on Top (1970). Arnold's cameo on backing vocals is a rare instance of a vocalist other than the Gibb brothers featuring on a Bee Gees record.

=== Personnel ===
- Barry Gibb — lead vocal, guitar
- Maurice Gibb — bass guitar, piano, guitar, mellotron, backing vocal
- Colin Petersen — drums
- Peter Mason — backing vocal
- P.P. Arnold — harmony and backing vocal
