= Seven Seas Symphony =

Song by Bee Gees

from the album Odessa
- Released: March 1969
- Recorded: November 1968; IBC Studios, London
- Genre: Classical music, orchestral
- Length: 4:09
- Label: Polydor Records (U.K.); Atco Records (U.S.)
- Composer(s): Barry, Robin & Maurice Gibb
- Producer(s): Robert Stigwood, Bee Gees

"Seven Seas Symphony" is an instrumental composed by Barry, Robin & Maurice Gibb, released on the Bee Gees album Odessa in March 1969.

== Recording ==
This song was originally recorded on August 19, 1968, at Atlantic Studios in New York City and was completed in November at IBC Studios in London. Its demo version was released in 2009 on the Sketches for Odessa disc with the remastered edition of the album. On the demo, a piano played by Maurice was heard. On the originally released version Maurice's piano was heard again along with Bill Shepherd's orchestra – aside from this, the Bee Gees band did not participate on this track or the other instrumental tracks on the album.

== Personnel ==
- Maurice Gibb – piano
- Bill Shepherd – orchestral arrangement
- P Sharp — sound engineer
- Philip Wade – sound engineer
