= For the Good Times (Dean Martin album) =

Studio album by Dean Martin
- Released: January 1971
- Recorded: September 1970
- Genres: Country, traditional pop
- Length: 27:11
- Labels: Reprise; RS 6428
- Producer: Jimmy Bowen

Dean Martin chronology
My Woman, My Woman, My Wife (1970)	For the Good Times (1971)	Dino (1972)

For the Good Times is the twenty-ninth studio album by Dean Martin arranged by Ernie Freeman and produced by Jimmy Bowen.

== Overview ==
Recorded after two charting singles, the album peaked at number 113 on the Billboard Top LP's and at number 41 on the Billboard Top Country LP's chart. It was reissued on CD by Capitol Records in 2006 and Hip-O Records in 2009. Though Martin was recording infrequently at this stage of his career, this was the second album he recorded in 1970.

== Reception ==
Professional ratings
Review scores
Source	Rating
Allmusic	2.5/5 stars

The initial Billboard review from 6 February 1971 commented that "Dean Martin is an old timer who knows how to make time with the new crop of writers". William Ruhlmann on Allmusic.com gave the album two and a half stars out of five. Ruhlmann said that "Martin handled the material with his usual careless aplomb, but the result was just another record, no better or worse than its immediate predecessors".

== Track listing ==
Side One:

1. "For the Good Times" (Kris Kristofferson) – 3:50
2. "Marry Me" (Barry Mason, Les Reed) – 2:34
3. "Georgia Sunshine" (Jerry Reed Hubbard) – 2:58
4. "Invisible Tears" (Ned Miller, Sue Miller) – 2:10
5. "Raindrops Keep Fallin' on My Head" (Burt Bacharach, Hal David) – 2:43

Side Two:

1. "A Perfect Mountain" (Gene Thomas) – 2:46
2. "Raining in My Heart" (Felice and Boudleaux Bryant) – 2:37
3. "She's a Little Bit of Country" (Harlan Howard) – 2:34
4. "For Once in My Life" (Ron Miller, Orlando Murden) – 2:19
5. "Sweetheart" (Barry Gibb, Maurice Gibb) – 2:40

== Personnel ==
- Dean Martin – vocals
- Ernie Freeman – arranger
- Ed Thrasher – art direction
- Eddie Brackett – engineer
- Jimmy Bowen – record producer
