= Melody (1971 film) =

1971 British film by Waris Hussein

- Film poster
- Directed by: Waris Hussein
- Written by: Alan Parker
- Produced by: David Puttnam; Ron Kass
- Starring: Jack Wild; Mark Lester; Tracy Hyde
- Cinematography: Peter Suschitzky
- Edited by: John Victor Smith
- Music by: Bee Gees; Crosby, Stills, Nash & Young
- Production companies: Hemdale Group; Sagittarius Productions; Goodtimes Enterprises
- Distributed by: British Lion Films
- Release date: 21 April 1971 (United Kingdom)
- Running time: 103 minutes
- Country: United Kingdom
- Language: English
- Budget: $600,000

Melody (title changed to S.W.A.L.K., which stands for Sealed With a Loving Kiss, for British Lion) is a 1971 British children's romantic comedy-drama film directed by Waris Hussein, centered on the theme of puppy love. The film stars Jack Wild, Mark Lester, and Tracy Hyde.

== Plot ==
Parents and teachers are the outsiders in this romantic story told from the perspective of the preteen children nominally in their care, but with hearts and minds of their own. Artistic, thoughtful Daniel Latimer is a loner who does most of what is expected of him, until he befriends and finds an ally in the troublemaking Ornshaw. But when Daniel falls in love with shy, mischievous Melody Perkins, the boys' friendship is jeopardized as Ornshaw becomes threatened by Daniel preferring to spend time with her. Initially embarrassed by the attention, Melody eventually returns Daniel's feelings, and they announce to their parents that they want to get married – not in the future, but right away.

Although the adults clumsily try to dissuade them, Daniel and Melody are determined, which leads Ornshaw to have a change of heart. Their classmates gather at one of their hideouts to stage the 'wedding', but a final showdown occurs when the children's teachers and parents arrive. During the melee, one boy throws a large homemade firecracker into a car (Daniel's mother's 1961 Triumph Herald convertible), causing it to explode. The adults and children all flee – except for one strict English teacher who continues to chase after Ornshaw and the young lovers. In the end, Ornshaw successfully chases the teacher away, and he helps Daniel and Melody escape on a railway handcar.

== Cast ==
- Mark Lester as Daniel Latimer
- Tracy Hyde as Melody Perkins
- Jack Wild as Tom Ornshaw
- Colin Barrie as Chambers
- Billy Franks as Burgess
- Ashley Knight as Stacey
- Craig Marriott as Dadds
- William Vanderpuye as O'Leary
- Peter Walton as Fensham
- Camille Davies as Muriel
- Dawn Hope as Maureen
- Kay Skinner as Peggy
- Lesley Roach as Rhoda
- Sheila Steafel as Mrs. Latimer
- Keith Barron as Mr. Latimer (Uncredited)
- Kate Williams as Mrs Perkins
- Roy Kinnear as Mr. Perkins
- Hilda Barry as Grandma Perkins
- James Cossins as Headmaster
- Ken Jones as Mr. Dicks
- June Jago as Miss Fairfax
- June C. Ellis as Miss Dimkins
- Tim Wylton as Mr. Fellows
- John Gorman as Boys' Brigade Captain
- Petal Young as Betty
- Robin Hunter as George
- Tracy Reed as (Television Film) Woman in Hospital
- Neil Hallett as (Television Film) Man in Hospital
- Leonard Brockwell as Boys' Group
- Stephen Mallett as Boys' Group

== Production ==
=== Development ===
The film was based on an idea by David Puttnam. At the time, he was working on film projects with Alan Parker, whom he knew from the advertising industry. Puttnam suggested that Parker write a love story involving children and mentioned that he had the rights to use seven Bee Gees songs. Parker was inspired by a line in the song "First of May," and the title came from the song "Melody Fair."

Parker stated that the script was based on his own experiences growing up in Islington, combined with some of Puttnam's experiences. "It's a combination of Puttnam's young life and my young life," Parker said. He also mentioned that his involvement in the film sparked his interest in filmmaking and influenced his work on Bugsy Malone.

=== Casting ===
Mark Lester (Daniel Latimer) and Jack Wild (Ornshaw) had previously co-starred in the 1968 musical film Oliver!. They were joined by child model Tracy Hyde in the title role. Other cast members included Kate Williams and Roy Kinnear as Melody's parents, and Sheila Steafel and Keith Barron as Daniel's parents, although Barron was uncredited in the cast list.

Melody marked the feature film debut of Tracy Hyde, who was 11 years old at the time. Writer/director Andrew Birkin recommended Hyde for the role of Melody Perkins to director Waris Hussein, after screening and auditioning more than 100 other girls. Jack Wild was actually 17 years old during the filming, during which co-star Lester turned 13.

=== Finance ===
Parker stated, "The film was mostly financed by Edgar Bronfman. Apparently, his 15-year-old son, Edgar Bronfman Jr., read the script and recommended that his father make the movie. Edgar Jr. was also a production runner on the film." Ron Kass was the one who sent the script to Bronfman, who provided £400,000 of the budget, while Hemdale contributed £200,000. At the time, Hemdale represented both Mark Lester and Jack Wild.

John Daly of Hemdale remarked, "Provided one is very businesslike and keeps a careful eye on costs and the market, there is no reason why one can't make excellent profits from films."

Waris Hussein was chosen to direct the film because Puttnam admired his work on A Time for Love.

=== Filming ===
Filming began on 12 May 1970, and took place over ten weeks, with two weeks spent in the studio.

Shooting occurred on location in Hammersmith and Lambeth in the greater London area. Post-production was completed at Twickenham Studios. The graveyard scenes were filmed at Brompton Cemetery and Nunhead Cemetery, while the seaside scenes in the latter part of the film were shot in Weymouth, Dorset.

Parker handled some second-unit direction for the film, including the montage sequences of the schoolchildren during break-time and on sports day.

=== Music ===
The film's soundtrack featured songs by the Bee Gees, including "In the Morning," "Melody Fair," "Give Your Best," and the hit singles "To Love Somebody" and "First of May." The soundtrack also included the Crosby, Stills, Nash & Young hit "Teach Your Children."

== Reception ==
=== Box office ===
Although the film was a box office disappointment in both the United States and Britain, it turned out to be a hit in Japan (making a reported £2 million) as well as in some Latin American countries such as Mexico, Argentina and Chile, and a modest hit in South Africa.

By May 1971 John Daly of Hemdale claimed the film had already made a "handsome profit".

=== Critical ===
The Evening Standard said the film was "done lightly and effectively."

Puttnam said "I always think of it [the film] as the Jules et Jim of the nappy set" adding "for a long time afterwards it was a cheque from Melody that kept Sandy [Lieberson his business partner] and me going."

== Home media ==
Melody was mastered for Region 2 format on DVD by Kadokawa Pictures in Japan. Kadokawa released it on Region A Blu-ray in Japan on 22 December 2015 and StudioCanal released it on Region B Blu-ray on 8 May 2017.

== Legacy ==
Alan Parker recalled in 2015:

It wasn’t a big hit except, curiously, in Japan. I still get letters from fans of the film in Tokyo and Osaka. Creatively, it got us all started. Up to this point, I had no intentions of a film career, but on “Melody,” I directed a small second-unit sequence, which was used, so probably I was bitten by the film bug then. Creatively, it has had an impact on other directors, as I have had many overtures, over the years, to remake it. Wes Anderson acknowledged that his film Moonrise Kingdom was inspired by “Melody.”

Seagram and Hemdale provided financing on Puttnam's next movie, The Pied Piper (1972).
