= A Challenge for Robin Hood =

1967 British film by C. M. Pennington-Richards

- UK quad poster by Tom Chantrell
- Directed by: C. M. Pennington-Richards
- Written by: Peter Bryan
- Produced by: Clifford Parkes; Michael Carreras
- Starring: Barrie Ingham; Peter Blythe; John Arnatt
- Cinematography: Arthur Grant
- Edited by: Chris Barnes
- Music by: Gary Hughes
- Production companies: Hammer Film Productions; Seven Arts Productions
- Distributed by: Warner-Pathé Distributors
- Release date: 1 July 1967
- Running time: 96 minutes
- Country: United Kingdom
- Language: English

A Challenge for Robin Hood is a 1967 British adventure film directed by C. M. Pennington-Richards and starring Barrie Ingham, Peter Blythe and John Arnatt.

This was the last of a trio of Hammer films about Robin Hood, following The Men of Sherwood Forest and Sword of Sherwood Forest. As all three had different casts and no continuing storyline, the second and third films should not really be considered sequels.

== Plot ==
When the father of the De Courtenay family dies, the brothers argue about the inheritance. Although rightfully most should go to Robin, his cousin Roger takes control after killing his brother and blaming Robin, and Robin has to go into hiding in the forest, taking Friar Tuck with him. The two come under attack from the Sheriff of Nottingham's soldiers but are saved by a mystery archer. This is Alan-a-Dale, who takes them to his forest hide-out despite distrusting Robin.

After Robin beats Alan-a-Dale in a quarterstaff duel, the gang tests his archery skills with a hood over his head, and agree he is a natural leader. They decide to call him Robin Hood.

Back in the De Courtenay castle, Roger sits with the Sheriff and Maid Marian and they watch a wrestling match. It is won by Little John. They plan to hang Will Scarlet, Robin's friend, who was captured at the time of Robin's escape, at the village fair.

Robin stops Sir Jamyl de Penitone in the forest and challenges him to a sword duel. He learns of Will Scarlet's pending hanging. Robin robs him of the tax money he has collected.

Robin and his men next stop a drayman and a pie seller traveling with him. They commandeer the cart-load of pies and Tuck disguises himself as the pie-seller, while Robin disguises himself as a monk. They go to the De Courteney fair, where they buy a lot of green cloth to better hide in the woods. A soldier recognises Robin but is sympathetic to his cause. Robin puts on a mask and volunteers for the prize wrestling match with Little John. John recognises him and they stage the fight so Robin wins. When he goes to collect his prize he grabs Marian and puts her on a horse for the loyal soldier to carry her off. He is arrested and is to be hung with Will Scarlet, but a pie fight begins and the soldiers are driven back. Little John and Will go back to the forest with them.

In the forest the men take revenge on the tax collector and start returning the tax money to the peasants.

The Sheriff's men trick Robin and his men into thinking the forest is on fire and while they investigate they kidnap Marian and her little brother, and kill Much, who was guarding them. Robin tries to rescue them but is captured too. Three of Robin's men (led by Little John) put fake ducks on their head and swim over the castle moat, despite a guard who fancies duck for dinner, and fires a crossbow at them. The three enter via an iron yett at basement level. They take a dumb waiter from the kitchen to the great hall, announcing that a "special dish" is coming up. They release Robin who was roasting in front of the fire and let other men in. A fight begins with the soldiers.

Roger and Robin end in a sword duel watched by Marian. Alan-a-Dale ends it with an arrow in Roger's back.

Back in the forest Friar Tuck marries Robin and Marian.

== Cast ==
- Barrie Ingham as Robin de Courtenay, alias Robin Hood
- Peter Blythe as Sir Roger de Courtenay
- John Arnatt as the Sheriff of Nottingham
- Gay Hamilton as Lady Marian Fitzwarren
- John Gugolka as Stephen Fitzwarren, the boy
- James Hayter as Friar Tuck
- Eric Flynn as Alan-a-Dale
- Reg Lye as Much
- Leon Greene as Little John
- Douglas Mitchell as Will Scarlett
- Eric Woofe as Henry de Courtenay
- John Harvey as Wallace, Sir Roger's chief henchman
- Arthur Hewlett as Edwin, the castle steward
- John Graham as Justin, a loyal guard
- Jenny Till as The Imposter Lady Marian
- William Squire as Sir John de Courtenay
- Norman Mitchell as dray driver
- Alfie Bass as the pie seller
- Donald Pickering as Sir Jamyl de Penitone

Note: Eric Flynn is not related to Errol Flynn.

== Reception ==
=== Critical ===
The Monthly Film Bulletin wrote: "Unassuming but lively rendering of the familiar legend. Simplicity is the keynote, with very few embellishments and distortions so that the characters emerge exactly as one remembers them. Sherwood Forest looks disappointingly sparse, but there is ample compensation in some splendidly arranged fights and in James Hayter's engagingly jovial Friar Tuck."

The New York Times wrote, "Challenge for Robin Hood is excellent ... it should make ideal viewing for lads, from little sprouts up to about 14 ... The screenplay by Peter Bryan fiddles a bit with the old Robin Hood legend, but it is a snug story and the dialogue has bite and humor ... C. M. Pennington-Richards, has piloted the action with crackle, the musical score is fine and the color ranges from good to beautiful ... the fairly modest budget seldom shows".

=== Box office ===
According to Fox records, the film required $950,000 in rentals to break even and by 11 December 1970 had made $675,000.

== See also ==
- List of films and television series featuring Robin Hood
