= Peter Blythe =

British actor (1934–2004)

- Born: 14 September 1934; Yorkshire, England
- Died: 27 June 2004 (aged 69)
- Occupation: Actor
- Partner: Harriet Walter (1996–2004)
- Children: 1

Peter Blythe (14 September 1934 – 27 June 2004) was an English character actor, probably best known as Samuel "Soapy Sam" Ballard in Rumpole of the Bailey.

== Early life ==
Born in Yorkshire, Blythe studied drama on scholarship at the Royal Academy of Dramatic Art after serving in the Royal Air Force. He began his professional career as a repertory player with the Living Theatre Company, the Nottingham Playhouse and the Royal Shakespeare Company. He made his West End debut in 1965.

== Selected theatre credits ==
Blythe was frequently associated with the director Peter Hall and the playwright Alan Ayckbourn.

- The Creeper (St. Martin's Theatre, 1965): Maurice
- Early Morning (English Stage Company/Royal Court, 1969): Lord Mennings
- So What About Love? (Criterion Theatre, 1969): Robert
- Absurd Person Singular (Criterion Theatre, 1974): Sidney
- The Clandestine Marriage (Savoy Theatre, 1975): Sir John Melvil
- The Return of A. J. Raffles (Royal Shakespeare Company/Aldwych Theatre, 1975): Lord Alfred Douglas
- The Chairman (Globe Theatre, 1976): Peter Frame (Clarence Derwent Award)
- Sextet (Criterion Theatre, 1976): Roger
- Caught in the Act (Garrick Theatre, 1981): Bill Taylor
- The Hard Shoulder (Aldwych Theatre, 1983): David
- Number One (The Queen's, 1984): Bernard
- Pravda (National Theatre/Olivier Theatre, 1985): Michael Quince, MP
- The Government Inspector (National Theatre/Olivier Theatre, 1985): Artemy Zemlyanika
- Futurists (National Theatre/Cottesloe Theatre, 1986): Lenin/Romanov
- Woman in Mind (Vaudeville Theatre, 1986): Bill
- The Living Room (Royalty Theatre Company, 1987): Michael Dennis
- Julius Caesar (Compass Theatre Company, UK national tour, 1990): Cassius
- The Hothouse (Chichester Festival Theatre; The Comedy, 1995): Lobb
- Hedda Gabler (Chichester Festival Theatre, 1996): Judge Brack
- Peter Hall Company at the Old Vic, 1997: Waste (Sir Charles Cantilupe, MP), The Provok'd Wife (Lord Rake), King Lear (Duke of Albany)
- Flight (National Theatre/Olivier Theatre, 1998): Commander in Chief of the White Army
- Hay Fever (Savoy Theatre, 1999): David Bliss
- Hamlet (Royal National Theatre, US national tour and some UK performances, 2001): Polonius/The Grave-digger
- The Royal Family (Theatre Royal Haymarket, 2001): Gilbert Marshall
- Mrs. Warren's Profession (Strand Theatre, 2002): Mr. Praed
- Humble Boy (Gielgud Theatre, 2002): Jim
- Henry V (National Theatre/Olivier Theatre, 2003): Duke of Exeter

== Film and television ==
Blythe worked in films only rarely and usually in minor roles; his most substantial part was also in his last film appearance, The Luzhin Defence (2000). Other film credits include two films for Hammer Film Productions, A Challenge for Robin Hood (1967) and Frankenstein Created Woman (also 1967); his most successful film was Carrington (1995).

By contrast, Blythe appeared in several dozen television series, miniseries and films, most notably as Samuel Ballard, QC in Rumpole of the Bailey (1983–92). He guest-starred in episodes of The Avengers (1966 A Sense of History episode and 1967 The Positive Negative Man episode, UFO (episodes "Destruction" and "The Psychobombs"), Callan, Van der Valk, New Scotland Yard, Special Branch, Agatha Christie's Partners in Crime, Agatha Christie's Poirot, Inspector Morse, Maigret, The Inspector Alleyn Mysteries, Between the Lines, Pie in the Sky, Goodnight Sweetheart, Dalziel and Pascoe and Foyle's War (aired posthumously), among many others. His miniseries appearances included The Barchester Chronicles, After the War and The Alan Clark Diaries. He narrated the 1970 TV comedy special Cucumber Castle starring the Bee Gees.

== Authorship ==
One of Blythe's plays, Tom, Dick and Harry, was produced at the Stephen Joseph Theatre, Scarborough in 1972 directed by Alan Ayckbourn. He also wrote two poetry chapbooks, Spring and The Light.

== Personal life ==
Blythe lived for eight years with Harriet Walter; the couple were planning to marry at the time of his death. He had a daughter from an earlier marriage.

Peter Blythe died on 27 June 2004 aged 69, shortly after being diagnosed with lung cancer.

== Filmography ==
=== Film ===
| Year | Title | Role | Notes |
|---|---|---|---|
| 1961 | The Day the Earth Caught Fire | Copy Desk | Uncredited |
| 1965 | Treasure Island | Dr. Livesey | TV film |
| 1966 | Kaleidoscope | Poker Player | |
| 1967 | Frankenstein Created Woman | Anton | |
| 1967 | A Challenge for Robin Hood | Roger de Courtenay | |
| 1969 | Alfred the Great | Eafa | |
| 1970 | Cucumber Castle | Narrator | TV film |
| 1970 | Jane Eyre | Frederick Lynn | TV film |
| 1977 | Act of Rape | The Jury: Rach | TV film documentary |
| 1977 | The Three Hostages | Sandy Arbuthnot | TV film |
| 1985 | Merlin and the Sword | Guide | TV film |
| 1989 | Passion and Paradise | Major Eric Nicholls | TV film |
| 1991 | The Bridge | Reverend Rount | |
| 1992 | The Guilty | Chris Bouch | TV film |
| 1995 | Carrington | Phillip Morrell | |
| 1995 | I.D. | DAC Evans | |
| 1995 | Devil's Advocate | Di Paulo | TV film |
| 2000 | The Luzhin Defence | Ilya | |
| 2001 | Sword of Honour | General Graves | TV film |
| 2002 | The Falklands Play | Michael Havers | TV film |

=== Television ===
| Year | Title | Role | Notes |
|---|---|---|---|
| 1960 | Barnaby Rudge | George | 1 episode |
| 1962 | ITV Play of the Week | Lout | Episode: "The Gentle Assassin" |
| 1964 | Teletale | Second Young Man | Episode: "Catherine" |
| 1964 | Diary of a Young Man | National Insurance man | Episode: "Marriage" |
| 1965 | Knock on Any Door | Eddie | Episode: "There's Always an Angle" |
| 1965 | Theatre 625 | John Ebony | Episode: "Unman, Wittering and Zigo" |
| 1966 | Love Story | Harry Granger | Episode: "Barefoot and in the Kitchen" |
| 1966 | Blackmail | Kenneth Rogers | Episode: "Please Do Not Disturb" |
| 1966 | The Avengers | Millerson | Episode: "A Sense of History" |
| 1967 | The Avengers | Mankin | Episode: "The Positive Negative Man" |
| 1967 | Theatre 625 | Emilio Brentani | Episode: "As a Man Grows Older" |
| 1967 | Witch Hunt | Cass Russell | Series regular |
| 1967 | Man in a Suitcase | Colin | Episode: "Sweet Sue" |
| 1968 | Late Night Horror | Dr. Vares | Episode: "No Such Thing as a Vampire" |
| 1969 | Armchair Theatre | Lister | Episode: "The Mandarins" |
| 1969 | ITV Playhouse | Michael Amlett | Episode: "Uncle Jonathan" |
| 1969 | The Root of All Evil? | Guy | Episode: "What's in It for Me?" |
| 1969 | Mr Digby Darling | Derek Quincey | Episode: "Prime of Life" |
| 1969 | Callan | Horst | Episode: "The Most Promising Girl of Her Year" |
| 1970 | Menace | Herky | Episode: "Nine Bean Rows" |
| 1970 | ITV Sunday Night Theatre | Stephen | Episode: "The Insider" |
| 1970 | UFO | Second Officer | Episode: "Destruction" |
| 1970 | UFO | Lieutenant Blythe | Episode: "The Psychobombs" |
| 1971 | Justice | Sommerfield | 2 episodes |
| 1972 | Callan | Trofimchuk | Episode: "If He Can, So Could I" |
| 1972 | New Scotland Yard | Detective Sergeant Robert Gilson | 2 episodes |
| 1972 | Pathfinders | Flight Sergeant Drew | Episode: "For Better, for Worse" |
| 1973 | ITV Sunday Night Theatre | Dr. Stumpfegger | Episode: "The Death of Adolf Hitler" |
| 1973 | Harriet's Back in Town | James Armitage | 4 episodes |
| 1973 | Van der Valk | Max | Episode: "Season for Love" |
| 1973 | Helen: A Woman of Today | Stephen | Recurring role |
| 1973 | Marked Personal | Elliot Fraser | 2 episodes |
| 1974 | Napoleon and Love | Duroc | Mini-series |
| 1974 | Special Branch | Fountain | Episode: "Downwind of Angels" |
| 1974 | Dial M for Murder | The Man | Episode: "If You Knew Susie" |
| 1974 | Armchair Cinema | Peter | Episode: "Regan" |
| 1975 | Six Days of Justice | James Grant | Episode: "A Juicy Case" |
| 1976 | Couples | John Vance | Recurring role |
| 1976-1982 | Crown Court | Laurence Pettifer QC | Recurring role |
| 1977 | The Sunday Drama | Jeremy Morgan | Episode: "Happy Returns" |
| 1977 | The Sound of Laughter | Nicholas Barry | Episode: "The Best of Friends" |
| 1981 | Holding the Fort | Major Pluccenik | Episode: "Under a Cloud" |
| 1982 | The Barchester Chronicles | Bertie Stanhope | Mini-series |
| 1983 | Jury | Ian | Episode: "Ann" |
| 1983 | Agatha Christie's Partners in Crime | Captain Bingo Hale | Episode: "Finessing the King" |
| 1983-1992 | Rumpole of the Bailey | Samuel Ballard QC | Series regular |
| 1984 | Me and My Girl | Keating | Episode: "Jobs for the Girls" |
| 1985 | A.D. | Procuius | Mini-series |
| 1987 | Home to Roost | Gordon | Episode: "Crime Watch" |
| 1988 | The Modern World: Ten Great Writers | Vladimir | Episode: "Joseph Conrad's 'The Secret Agent' |
| 1988 | Small World | Custer | Mini-series |
| 1989 | After the War | Sir Stafford Canning | Mini-series |
| 1990 | El C.I.D. | Holt | Episode: "Getting Even" |
| 1992 | Agatha Christie's Poirot | Blunt | Episode: "One, Two, Buckle My Shoe" |
| 1992 | Inspector Morse | Kenneth Lawrence | Episode: "The Death of the Self" |
| 1992 | Medics | Alistair Boyd | 1 episode |
| 1992 | Perfect Scoundrels | Ford | Episode: "Last of the Few" |
| 1993 | Maigret | Fernand Courcel | Episode: "Maigret's Boyhood Friend" |
| 1993 | The Inspector Alleyn Mysteries | Thomas Ancred | Episode: "Final Curtain" |
| 1993 | Between the Lines | Commander Sparrow | Episode: "The Great Detective" |
| 1993 | Sitting Pretty | Tom Nicholls MP | Episode: "Rumours" |
| 1994 | Nelson's Column | Councillor Stewart | Episode: "Back to Basics" |
| 1994 | Pie in the Sky | Gerald Hopkinson | Episode: "Undesirable Elements" |
| 1994 | Moving Story | Mr. Bates | Episode: "Moving Story" |
| 1994 | Love on a Branch Line | Mark Fairweather | Episode: "Yes Sir, That's My Baby" |
| 1995 | The High Life | Vincent Stoat | Episode: "Drunk" |
| 1995 | Goodnight Sweetheart | Gregory | 2 episodes |
| 1995 | Screen Two | Charles | Episode: "Mrs. Hartley and the Growth Centre" |
| 1997 | Dalziel and Pascoe | Superintendent Derek Backhouse | Episode: "Ruling Passion" |
| 2000 | My Family | Lord Whitten | Episode: "Droit Seigneur Ben" |
| 2003 | Only Fools and Horses | Mr. Cartwright | Episode: "Sleepless in Peckham...!" |
| 2004 | Foyle's War | Lawrence Smythe | Episode: "Enemy Fire" |
| 2004 | The Alan Clark Diaries | Tom King | Series regular |
