= Marley Purt Drive =

- Label from South African single

Single by Bee Gees

from the album Odessa
- B-side: "Melody Fair"
- Released: July 1969 (South Africa)
- Recorded: 15 August, November 1968
- Genre: Country rock, roots rock
- Label: Polydor; Atco (Atco Records)
- Songwriter: Barry, Robin & Maurice Gibb
- Producers: Robert Stigwood, Bee Gees

"Marley Purt Drive" is a song recorded by the Bee Gees, It was written by Barry, Robin & Maurice Gibb and released in March 1969 on the album Odessa. It was released in stereo in the United States in January and its mono version was released in the United Kingdom in March. The remastered version of this song was released on 27 February 2009 on Reprise Records.

Originally titled "Marley Purt Drive (Area Code 213)", the song is about a married man in poverty with fifteen children who takes a drive out to Pasadena one Sunday to get some relief from the situation only to return and find he now has twenty more children to look after, thus creating "An orphanage [with] 35 kids.

== Recording and structure ==
For the recording of the song, the basic instrumental line-up of Barry and Maurice Gibb, Vince Melouney and Colin Petersen were joined by bluegrass musician Bill Keith on banjo. This song was recorded in New York City at Atlantic Studios. Two recordings are available, the earlier of these was recorded on August 15 and later appeared on Sketches for Odessa in 2006. The version released on the album was finished at IBC Studios in London in November with the orchestra. Barry later explained the recording of "Marley Purt Drive" in a 24 March 2001 interview with Billboard, "['Marley Purt Drive'] had a country violinist and banjo player on it because we were listening to American country music at that time".

It was released as a single in South Africa in July 1969, backed with "Melody Fair". The song's demo is entitled Alternate Mix on Sketches for Odessa and begins with a false start followed by one count but then goes into an almost identical intro. The mix is not really different, and lyrics are the same.

== Release ==
This song, owing something to The Band's 1968 hit "The Weight", later appeared on the charity compilation album called No One's Gonna Change Our World released on December 12, 1969.

On 6 November 1974, they performed the song in Sapporo, Japan during their Mr. Natural tour. In 2009, Barry Gibb performed the song for the rehearsal for the Love and Hope Ball.

== Personnel ==
- Barry Gibb – lead vocals, guitar
- Vince Melouney – guitar
- Maurice Gibb – bass guitar, backing vocals
- Bill Keith – banjo
- Colin Petersen – drums
- Robin Gibb – backing vocals

== Cover versions ==
- Puerto Rican singer José Feliciano recorded perhaps the best known cover of "Marley Purt Drive". His version was released as a single in the US and Germany on July 19, 1969 on RCA Records. and around the world. The single charted in many countries including the US, Canada, Australia, Brazil and Malaysia where it was a top ten hit
- Bonnie St. Claire released this song as a single in 1969 on Philips Records. The B-side was "Let Me Come Back Home, Mama", a non-Gibb song. Their version was included on The Best Of Bonnie St. Claire (1970).
- Victor Scott covered this song under the title "Fifteen Kids" backed with "Love is All I Have" on Decca Records in 1970. This record was only released in Germany.
- David Frizzell brought out a version on the B-side of "Little Toy Trains" in 1969 on Columbia Records.
- Equipe 84 covered this song under the title "Pomeriggio Ore 6" with unrelated lyrics, but only released in Italy on Dischi Ricordi.
- Lulu released a cover as the first track on her 1970 album New Routes. Her version features guitar work by Duane Allman. She was married to Maurice Gibb at the time.
- Jean Bouchéty's version appeared on his 1971 album The Rhythms Sounds And Melodies Of Jean Bouchéty (1971).
- Nash Chase's version was released on his self-titled album in 1970.
- July Paul covered this song in 2021 on Goshawk 66 Records. His version was released as a single in 2021, on the album Best Summer Of My Life in 2013 and also on the album Summer Feeling in 2016.
