= Melody Fair =

Single by Bee Gees

from the album Odessa
- A-side: "Marley Purt Drive" (South Africa)
- B-side: "Morning of My Life" (Japan)
- Released: July 1969 (South Africa) May 1971 (Japan)
- Recorded: 26 & 27 October 1968
- Genre: Pop
- Length: 3:48
- Label: Polydor (United Kingdom); Atco (United States)
- Songwriters: Barry Gibb; Robin Gibb; Maurice Gibb
- Producers: Robert Stigwood, Bee Gees

"Melody Fair" is a song by the Bee Gees, written by Barry, Robin & Maurice Gibb in 1968 and released in 1969 on their album Odessa. It was not released as a single, but this song was played on many radio stations, and was a hit in Japan. Andy Gibb's 1974 group, named Melody Fayre was named after this song. It also featured as the theme to Melody, a British film featuring a number of Bee Gees songs in its soundtrack.

== Writing and recording ==
According to Barry Gibb, "I think 'Melody Fair' was written in the studio, we used to write a lot of stuff on the spot in the studio. We often used to go to recording studios without any songs at all. Because the time was booked [and] we had to be there. So we'd turn up at seven at night, and we'd basically start writing and cutting the backing track of a song that wasn't finished. We would just create it in that way. A lot of albums were done in a month or five weeks. The first one was three weeks, 'Melody Fair' was probably influenced by 'Eleanor Rigby', I was wanting to make the same kind of statement". In The Billboard Interview on 24 March 2001, Maurice talks about this track, "For 'Melody Fair', I think we were just in IBC Studios jamming together".

The group finished writing "Melody Fair" on October 25 and recorded its demo the next day at IBC. An alternate mix made on October 27, featuring the mellotron that was mixed out later, appears on the Sketches for Odessa bonus disc released with the remastered edition in 2009. Robin appears to be absent with Maurice singing the opening lines of the refrain directly after Barry finishes singing the verses. This is one of a handful of songs to make some use of Barry Gibb singing in a falsetto voice, which would become a featured part of the Bee Gees' sound starting with their 1975 hit single "Nights on Broadway".

The demo features an acoustic guitar and drum backing track. Unlike the other songs on Odessa, the lyrics are also the same on the demo and its finished version. The only different lyric on the demo was She shouldn't cry, she should smile all day, Just like a merry-go-round. The alternate mix, which was released on Sketches for Odessa has a different, fuller and more backing track and Barry's vocals on that mix were also the same on the demo and finished version; however, the drums on that version are removed from the final recording of the song.

== Other releases ==
The song has appeared on many compilations, and featured on singles in some countries. After its release on Odessa, it was included on their EP Marley Purt Drive.

In May 1971 it was released as a single only in Japan where it reached #2. The song was recorded again on August 27, 1970, while they were recording for their album 2 Years On. This version was never released. The song was featured over the opening titles of the 1971 movie Melody which made use of other Bee Gees songs in its soundtrack. It was not released as a single in the US and UK, but become a favourite of fans and later appeared on the band's compilation album Best of Bee Gees, Volume 2. They performed the song in Japan in early 1972 before they began recording their album To Whom It May Concern. The song was performed in acoustic form on the One For All Tour in 1989. and the One Night Only tour in the late 1990s but did not feature on the video releases of either tour.

== Critical reception ==
Donald A. Guarisco at Allmusic describes this song as "a graceful melody that makes them sound like a grand, mournful proclamation".

== Commercial performance ==
Song has sold 500,000 copies in Japan.

== Personnel ==
- Barry Gibb – lead vocals, rhythm guitar
- Maurice Gibb – lead and backing vocals, bass, piano, rhythm guitar
- Colin Petersen – drums
- Bill Shepherd – orchestral arrangement

== Cover versions ==
- The New Dawn released their version as a single in 1969 on Imperial Records.
- Brothers Pride recorded their version of "Melody Fair", released as a single in 1969 on GNP Crescendo.
- Lulu, married to Maurice Gibb at the time, released a version as the title song to her 1970 album.
