= Vic Lewis =

British jazz musician (1919–2009)

Vic Lewis MBE
- Born: Victor Lewis; 29 July 1919; London, England
- Died: 9 February 2009 (aged 89) Barnet, London, England
- Genres: Jazz
- Occupations: Musician; Bandleader; Agent; Manager
- Instrument: Guitar
- Years active: 1938-2009
- Spouse: Jill Anstey (m. 1950; died 2008)

Victor Lewis (29 July 1919 – 9 February 2009) was a British jazz guitarist and bandleader. He also enjoyed success as an artists' agent and manager.

== Performing career ==
He was born in London, England to a family of jewellers. Lewis began playing the guitar at the age of three, and dabbled with cornet and trombone. One of his early bands included George Shearing, then a teenager, among its members. Lewis first toured the United States in 1938, where he played his favoured four string guitar in recording sessions, including a band that had Bobby Hackett, Eddie Condon, and Pee Wee Russell among its members. He served in the Royal Air Force from 1941 to 1944; during this time he recorded with Buddy Featherstonhaugh. He worked with Stephane Grappelli during 1944-45 and with Ted Heath soon after. While he was in the RAF, he met Jack Parnell and together they formed a sextet, the "Vic Lewis/Jack Parnell Jazzmen", releasing recordings on Parlophone's Super Rhythm Style label.

Lewis played a role in helping to popularise the music of Stan Kenton and Gerry Mulligan in Britain. When he put together his first big band in 1946 to play swing jazz he soon began to direct the ensemble toward a more American sound influenced by Kenton. Kenton provided Lewis with some of his arrangements by Mulligan, Pete Rugolo and Bill Holman, and they became close friends. Lewis's pianist, Ken Thorne, also made arranging contributions. Lewis toured the US with the band at various intervals between 1956 and 1959, and recorded extensively for Parlophone, Esquire, Decca, and Philips.

Mulligan's Music (1954) contains eight arrangements of Gerry Mulligan tunes, and features the then 18 year-old Tubby Hayes. The album At the Beaulieu Festival was recorded in 1959 but not issued until 1964. It features a 12 piece ensemble and includes selections from Lewis's extended Springbok and American suites, with Kenny Wheeler. Vic Lewis Plays Bossa Nova at Home and Away was issued in 1963. The first side was recorded in London, with contributions from Tubby Hayes, Ronnie Scott, Shake Keane and others. Side two came from a session in California, featuring Bud Shank, Shelly Manne and Shorty Rogers. Lewis had first met some of these musicians while conducting the Stan Kenton Orchestra at Carnegie Hall in 1950.

After 1959 Lewis semi-retired as a performer as he became involved in artist management. He only occasionally recorded, although he continued to write about jazz and champion its value. His involvement in the West Coast All Stars during the 1990s was mostly backroom. Meanwhile his composing interests shifted more towards classical music and he conducted recordings of his own music and those of others with the Royal Philharmonic Orchestra. His orchestral compositions include the Russian Suite, a Romance for Violin, and two movements ("Red" and "Jade") from Colours, a multi-composer suite he put together and conducted in 1997. Other composers featured on Colours include John Cameron, Kenny Clayton, Randy Edelman, Robert Farnon, David Morgan, John Scott, Ken Thorne and Malcolm Williamson.

== Artist management ==
In the early 1960s, as the big bands declined, Lewis turned to artist management, overseeing the careers of photographer Robert Whitaker and the singer Cilla Black among many others. In 1964, Lewis sold his management agency to Brian Epstein's company NEMS, and thereafter worked with Epstein on arranging the Beatles' international tours. Following Epstein's death in 1967, Lewis served as managing director of NEMS. He also managed Robin Gibb of the Bee Gees, and Lewis produced Gibb's debut album Robin's Reign released in 1970.

== Cricket ==
As a keen cricketer and administrator, he founded his own show business cricket club in 1952, featuring many celebrities in the various teams he put together. He represented the United States at the International Cricket Council. Lewis served as a General Committee Member of Middlesex County Cricket Club between 1976 and 2001. He wrote the book Cricket Ties: An International Guide for Cricket Lovers in 1984.

== Personal life and death ==
Lewis married the actress Jill Anstey in 1950. An autobiography, Music and Maiden Overs: My Showbusiness Life (written with the publicist Tony Barrow and with a discography compiled by Tony Middleton) was published in 1987. He also collaborated with Robert Feather on a volume of photographs, My Life in Jazz (2007). Lewis was awarded the MBE in 2007. He died in 2009. His wife having predeceased him in 2008, he was survived by daughter Dannie and granddaughter Jasmine.

== Discography ==
- New York Jazzmen and Jam Session (1938, 1944 sessions), Upbeat URCD 192 (2007)
- Vic Lewis and Jack Parnell's jazzmen (Parlophone releases, 1944-45)
  - 'Singin' the Blues' (1944-45 sessions with Parnell), Upbeat URDC 163 (2001)
- Mulligan's Music, Vic Lewis & His Orchestra (Decca, 1954, reissued Vocalion)
- Progressive Jazz, Vol. 1, Vic Lewis & His Orchestra (Decca, 1956, re-issued Vocalion)
- Vic Lewis Plays Bossa Nova at Home and Away (His Master's Voice, 1963)
- At the Beaulieu Festival (aka Big Band Explosion), Vic Lewis & His Allstars (1964)
- Plays the Songs of the Beatles (DJM Silverline, 1973)
- Colours, Royal Philharmonic Orchestra (RCA, 1977, reissued Vocalion, 2005)
- In Concert (Hep, 1978)
- Back Again, Vic Lewis & His Big Band (Concept, 1984)
- Tea Break, Vic Lewis & His Orchestra (Concept, 1985)
- Jazz from Two Sides (1959 recordings, reissued Concept 1987)
- Vic Lewis Big Bands (Concept, 1988)
- Vic Lewis West Coast Allstars play Bill Holman (Candid CCD 79535, 1993)
- Vic Lewis West Coast Allstars Present a Celebration of West Coast Jazz (Candid, 1994)
- The Project with Andy Martin (Drewbone, 2004)
