= Pholhas =

- Origin: São Paulo, São Paulo, Brazil
- Genres: Progressive rock, Disco music
- Years active: 1969-present
- Label: RCA
- Members: João Alberto; Paulinho Fernandes; Bitão; Elias Jó
- Past members: Osvaldo Malagutti; Hélio Santisteban; Marinho Testoni
- Website: https://www.pholhas.com.br/

Pholhas (Portuguese pronunciation: [ˈfoʎɐs], sheets) is a Brazilian rock band from São Paulo. They achieved success with songs including "My Mistake", "She Made Me Cry", and others.

== History ==
Pholhas formed in 1969 with the following members: Helio Santisteban on keyboard, Paulo Fernandes on drums, Oswaldo Malagutti on bass, and Wagner "Bitão" Benatti in lead guitar. The four member would alternate turns on vocals. They began performing covers for bands from the United States and England and started composing in English.

The band's first LP, Dead Faces, released in 1973 by RCA, contained only songs in English. A simple compact was extracted from this album, with the song "My Mistake" (the song tells the story of a passionate murder, resuming the blues tradition of using everyday tragedies to reflect on the meaning of life). The compact reached the top of many charts, selling 400,000 copies in just three months. Other songs were released in compacts, such as "She Made Me Cry", "I Never Did Before" and "Forever", all reaching sales exceeding 300,000 copies. In 1975, the debut album was released on the Hispanic market under the title "Hojas", giving the group a gold record.

In 1977 the group changed its orientation, releasing the LP O Som das Discotheques, with covers of the main hits of the genre, which sold 150,000 copies.

Shortly thereafter, Hélio Santisteban decided to pursue a solo career. Marinho Testoni, a former member of the Brazilian rock bandCasa das Máquinas, took his place. This led to another change in the group, which released a progressive rock album, with Portuguese lyrics for the first time. The album sold much less than previous releases, but it later gathered a cult following.

In 1978, Oswaldo Malagutti left the band. He was replaced by bassist João Alberto, another former member of Casa das Máquinas. Malagutti, along with Santisteban, created the MOSH Studio (acronym of their names), which works with production and mastering of musical CDs and DVDs.

In 1980, Hélio Santisteban returned to Pholhas, and the band resumed the tradition of singing and composing in English. The band released the LP Memories. A few months later, with Marinho's departure, Pholhas reached the following formation: Bitão on guitar, Paulo Fernandes on drums, Hélio Santisteban on keyboard, and João Alberto on bass.

At the end of 2007, Hélio Santisteban left the band permanently. From then on, Bitão, Paulinho and João Alberto decided to no longer have a fixed keyboardist. Instead, a keyboardist was specially invited for each performance. This formula worked so well that it became an attractive staple of each of their shows.

As of 2026, Pholhas continues to present shows all over Brazil and abroad, with recreations of hits from English and American rock, especially from the Bee Gees, Creedence Clearwater Revival, Elvis Presley, the Rolling Stones and the Beatles.

On August 26, 2018, keyboardist and vocalist Helio Santisteban died at 69 years old.

== Discography ==
=== Albums ===
- 1973 - Dead Faces
- 1974 - Forever
- 1975 - Hojas
- 1975 - Pholhas
- 1977 - Pholhas
- 1978 - O Som das Discotheques
- 1980 - Memories
- 1982 - Pholhas
- 1985 - Wings
- 1988 - Corte sem Lei (in Portuguese)
- 2003 - 70's Greatest Hits
- 2015 - Pholhas – 45 Anos
- 2017 - Black & White

=== Singles and EPs ===
- 1972- "My Mistake"
- 1973 - "My Mistake/Pope"
- 1973 - "She Made Me Cry/In My Way"
- 1973 - "She Made Me Cry"
- 1974 - "Pholhas"
- 1974 - "Forever/Special Girl"
- 1975 - "My Mistake/She Made Me Cry"
- 1975 - "Special Girl"
- 1975 - "Ya Me Voy De Aqui = Good-Bye"
- 1976 - "Get Back/My Sorrow"
- 1976 - "Pholhas"
- 1977 - "I Still Remember"
- 1979 - "I Love You/I Remember"
- 1980 - "Let Us Try/ Your Rainbow"
- 1980 - "I Love You"

=== Compilations ===
- 1977 - Disco de Ouro
- 1981 - Disco de Ouro, Vol. 2
- 1987 - The Night Before
- 1996 - Pholhas, 25 Anos
- 1997 - Pholhas Forever, 26 Anos
- 2001 - Pholhas
- 2005 - Maxximum
- 2006 - 20 Super Sucessos
- 2009 - Sempre>
