= Lamplight =

- German cover of "Lamplight"

Single by Bee Gees

from the album Odessa
- A-side: "First of May"
- Released: January 1969 (United Kingdom); March 1969 (United States)
- Recorded: 1968, Trident and IBC Studios, London
- Genre: Baroque pop
- Length: 4:47
- Label: Polydor; Atco (United States, Canada)
- Songwriter: Barry, Robin & Maurice Gibb
- Producers: Robert Stigwood; Bee Gees

Bee Gees flipsides singles chronology
| "Kilburn Towers" (1968) | "Lamplight" (1969) | "Sun in My Morning" (1969) |

"Lamplight" is a song by the Bee Gees, released as the B-side of "First of May", but featured as the single's A-side in Germany. It also featured on their double album Odessa in March 1969. The song was written and composed by Barry, Robin & Maurice Gibb and featured lead vocals by Robin Gibb. No other singles were released from the album, and the fact that the group's manager Robert Stigwood chose "First of May", which only featured Barry Gibb's voice for the A-side, caused Robin to quit the group (he would return in 1970).

== Recording ==
The song's demo was recorded on October 25, 1968 – this and another early version featured on the Sketches for Odessa disc released with the album's remastered edition in 2009. The song's introduction is sung in French – Alors viens encore cherie J'attendrai ans après ans sous la lampe dans la vieille avenue. The same passage was sung at the song's end, this time in English. There are no French words featured on the demo; it starts straight in at the first stanza.

The song was recorded in Trident and IBC Studios, London, England, and was produced by Robert Stigwood with the Bee Gees. This song was included on their EP called I Started a Joke, released in the same year.

== Personnel ==
- Robin Gibb – lead and backing vocals, piano, Mellotron
- Maurice Gibb – harmony vocals, bass, piano, acoustic guitar, Mellotron
- Barry Gibb – harmony vocals, acoustic guitar
- Colin Petersen – drums
- Bill Shepherd – orchestral arrangement

== Cover versions ==
Singers Steve Barry and Lorraine Piché covered this song in 2002. Steve Barry produced the recording.
