= Don't Forget to Remember =

Single by Bee Gees

from the album Cucumber Castle
- B-side: "The Lord"
- Released: August 1969
- Recorded: 7 May 1969; IBC Studios, London
- Genre: Country; orchestral pop
- Length: 3:28
- Label: Polydor (United Kingdom); Atco (United States)
- Songwriters: Barry Gibb, Maurice Gibb
- Producers: Robert Stigwood, Bee Gees

Bee Gees singles chronology
"Tomorrow Tomorrow" (1969)	"Don't Forget to Remember" (1969)	"If Only I Had My Mind on Something Else" (1970)

Audio sample
- "Don't Forget To Remember": file; help

"Don't Forget to Remember", also called "Don't Forget to Remember Me", is a country ballad recorded by the Bee Gees, from the album Cucumber Castle. The song was written by Barry and Maurice Gibb. It was produced by the band with Robert Stigwood.

== Recording ==
The song's genre is country, like much of what Maurice and Barry wrote together without input from their brother Robin, but all three brothers have written in the medium at other times, most notably the Kenny Rogers and Dolly Parton hit "Islands in the Stream", and its parent album Eyes That See in the Dark.

The song was recorded on 7 May 1969, the same day as the unreleased track "Who Knows What a Room Is". Barry Gibb's lead vocal is in a lower register than usual. Peter Mason, Robin's intended replacement in the group, originally sang harmony vocals on the song, as Mason explains, "I did some harmonies, I remember doing three songs, there was 'Don't Forget to Remember' and I put the harmony down on that and two other songs. [I don't know] whether it's a tryout, although he'd said before that he wanted me, because we sat and sang together."

Mason also explained: "When I sit and listen to 'Don't Forget to Remember' I can't really tell whether it's me or not. He ran the tracks and said, 'Can you put a harmony to that?'". The song also sticks out in Mason's memory.

== Structure ==
The song features Barry Gibb singing at a lower pitch than usual. The song's lyrics follow the country-song tradition of romantic laments with its tearful first-person lyrics about a man haunted by a failed love affair he can't put out of his mind. Its melody matches the yearning quality of the lyrics, especially on the chorus, which underpins the forlorn wish Don't forget to remember me/And the love that used to be with glorious runs of ascending notes. On paper, the song seems applicable to the group's usual pop style but their recording uses country-music elements to carry it into that genre, a prominent acoustic guitar cuts through the background orchestration and Barry Gibb adds a Nashville-inspired twang to his vocal.

== Release ==
Maurice's reaction when the song was released was "The thing is that it is Jim Reeves-ish; it's rather like 'Oh Lonesome Me' and that sort of song and you'll never forget the melody. It wasn't a deliberate dedication to Jim Reeves - it's just worked out that way". Maurice also explains, "We know we don't want to split up, maybe Colin will want to leave sometime in the future, but we all have different things we've involved in". The single covers of the song, (in all countries) features the three remaining Bee Gees after the departure of Robin Gibb.

Record World called it a "country-flavored ballad" that's "another solid winner for the Bee Gees."

The song was re-released in CD by RSO Records as a part in the EP of the same name (1987).

== Personnel ==
Credits from Bee Gees historian and sessionographer Joseph Brennan.

- Barry Gibb – lead vocals, acoustic rhythm guitar
- Maurice Gibb – harmony vocals, bass, piano, guitar, Mellotron
- Colin Petersen – drums
- Peter Mason – harmony vocals (possibly erased from the final recording or not included in final mix)
- Uncredited – orchestral and string arrangements
- Robert Stigwood, the Bee Gees – producers
- unknown – orchestra members, audio engineer

== Charts ==
=== Weekly charts ===
Chart (1969)	Peak position
Australia (Kent Music Report)	10
Austria (Ö3 Austria Top 40)	8
Belgium (Ultratop 50 Flanders)	3
Canada Top Singles (RPM)	39
Denmark	1
Germany (Media Control Charts)	9
Finland (Suomen Virallinen)	17
France (SNEP)	42
Ireland (IRMA)	1
Netherlands (Dutch Top 40)	1
New Zealand (Recorded Music NZ)	1
Norway (VG-lista)	2
South Africa (Springbok Radio)	1
Spain (PROMUSICAE)	27
Switzerland (Swiss Hitparade)	2
UK Singles (Official Charts Company)	2
US Billboard Hot 100	73
US Cash Box	63
US Record World	46

=== Year-end charts ===
Chart (1969)	Position
Austria (Ö3 Austria Top 40)	16
Belgium (Ultratop 50 Flanders)	20
Netherlands (Dutch Top 40)	25
Switzerland (Swiss Hitparade)	10

Chart (1970)	Position
Norway Singles Chart (VG-lista)	10

== Certifications ==
Region	Certification	Certified units/sales
New Zealand (RMNZ)	Gold	

== Cover versions ==
- The version of this song by Elton John was released on "12 Top Hits" (Avenue-AVE034)
- Swedish dansband Flamingokvintetten covered the song in 1972, with lyrics in Swedish, as "Jag vill leva mitt liv med dig" ("I want to live my life with you").
- Country singer Skeeter Davis covered the song and reached #44 on the country charts with it in 1974.
- Another country singer Kikki Danielsson covered the song with the original lyrics in English on her 1993 album Jag ska aldrig lämna dig.
- Anna McGoldrick covered this song in 1998.
- Brian Letton covered this song in 1997.
- Daniel O'Donnell (1987),
- Donna Fargo covered this song in 1978
- John & Anne Ryder covered the song in 1969.
- South African singer Ray Dylan covered the song on his album Goeie Ou Country vol 2.
- Monika Martin has a German Version "Du warst da, als der Sommer kam"
