= Tomorrow Tomorrow (Bee Gees song) =

Single by Bee Gees
- B-side: "Sun In My Morning"
- Released: 30 May 1969
- Recorded: 19–21 March 1969
- Studio: IBC Studios, London
- Genre: Blue-eyed soul
- Length: 4:05
- Label: Polydor 56381 (United Kingdom); Atco (United States/Canada)
- Songwriters: Barry Gibb, Maurice Gibb
- Producers: Robert Stigwood, Bee Gees

Bee Gees singles chronology
"First of May" (1969)	"Tomorrow Tomorrow" (1969)	"Don't Forget to Remember" (1969)

Audio sample
- "Tomorrow, Tomorrow": file; help

Alternative cover
- Scandinavia picture sleeve

"Tomorrow Tomorrow" is a song by the Bee Gees written by Barry and Maurice Gibb. The song was originally intended to be recorded by Joe Cocker. It was the first Bee Gees single released after Robin Gibb had quit the group which was now down to a trio featuring Barry Gibb, Maurice Gibb and drummer Colin Petersen.

== Origin ==
Originally, the song was written for Joe Cocker, but the group ultimately released it themselves. Barry rushed the track through, but it never reached Joe, who was given 'Delta Lady' by his management instead".

This song was recorded on 19 and 21 March 1969. Its B-side, "Sun In My Morning", was also recorded on March 19.

== Release ==
Released in the United States on 1 June 1969, the single charted, only reaching No. 54 on Billboard, but cracked the Top 40 on Cash Box, reaching No. 32. It achieved top ten placings in Brazil, New Zealand and some European countries, even topping the chart in Denmark, but in the brothers' native Britain it peaked only at No. 23. The promotional video, featuring Barry, Maurice and Colin performing the song in a park, is very rare. The band's manager, Robert Stigwood, made the decision to release the song as a single. Maurice later revealed, "We've got another one that we'll put straight out if it doesn't make it". The song was felt by both brothers to be more suited to Joe Cocker's singing style than their own. Barry said, "This was a mistake that Robert [Stigwood] very rarely made", while Maurice remarked, "I don't think it's us but I quite like it".

Since neither song appeared on the next Bee Gees' album Cucumber Castle, no stereo mixes were produced until 1990 when they appear on the Bee Gees box set Tales from the Brothers Gibb. Barry can be heard counting the band in at the start of the stereo mix.

The original single mix made its CD debut on the 1980s reissue of Best of Bee Gees where it replaced "Spicks and Specks" which had been left off the CD for contractual reasons. It had previously appeared on the 1976 budget compilation Massachusetts which had largely consisted of B-sides and non-album tracks.

Cash Box commented on the fact that the song goes through "several musically-exciting changes." Record World said "Those Bee Gees have another smash with 'Tomorrow Tomorrow'...which is embellished with horns and lots of strings." Billboard called it "a strong driving rhythm ballad" with a "powerful lead vocal by Barry Gibb."

== Personnel ==
- Barry Gibb – lead vocals, rhythm guitar
- Maurice Gibb – backing vocals, bass guitar, piano, rhythm guitar
- Colin Petersen – drums
- Robert Stigwood – record producer
- Bill Shepherd – orchestral arrangement, violins

== Charts ==
=== Weekly charts ===
Chart (1969)	Peak position
Australia (Kent Music Report)	28
Austria (Ö3 Austria Top 40)	7
Belgium (Ultratop 50)	9
Brazil	4
Canada Top Singles (RPM)	19
Denmark	1
Germany (Media Control Charts)	6
Italy (Musica e Dischi)	24
Netherlands (Dutch Top 40)	3
New Zealand (Recorded Music NZ)	3
Norway (VG-lista)	3
South Africa (Springbok Radio)	9
Spain (PROMUSICAE)	12
Switzerland (Swiss Hitparade)	6
UK Singles (Official Charts Company)	23
US Billboard Hot 100	54
US Cash Box	32
US Record World	32

=== Year-end charts ===
Chart (1969)	Position
Austria (Ö3 Austria Top 40)	11
Belgium (Ultratop 50)	16
Netherlands (Dutch Top 40)	24
Switzerland (Swiss Hitparade)	8
