= Terry Cox =

British drummer (1937–2026)

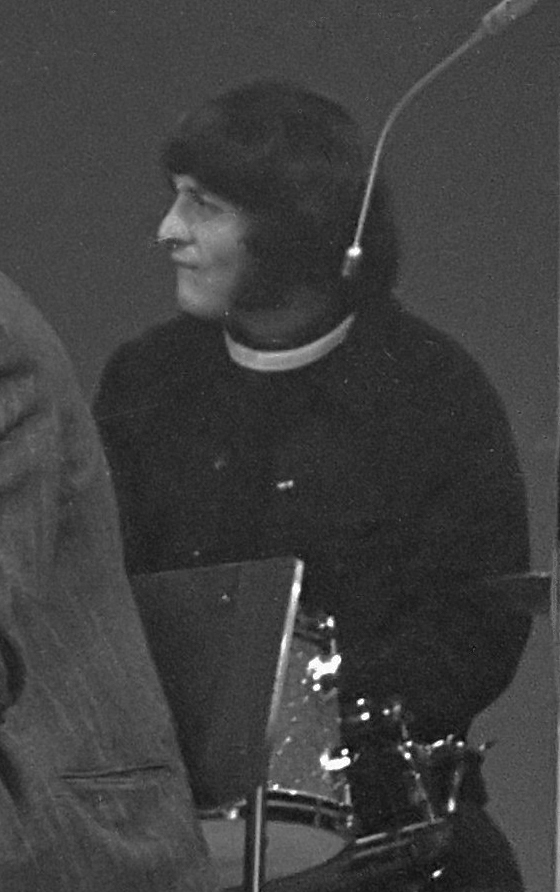
- Cox in 1969

Background information
- Born: 13 March 1937; High Wycombe, Buckinghamshire, England
- Died: 19 March 2026 (aged 89) Maó, Menorca, Spain
- Instrument: Drums

Terence William Harvey Cox (13 March 1937 – 19 March 2026) was a British drummer who was a member of folk rock bands The Pentangle, Duffy's Nucleus and Humblebums.

Cox also drummed with several other artists, most notably David Bowie and Elton John. He was drummer for Charles Aznavour between 1974 and 1982. In 1973, he had a songwriting partnership with Lynsey de Paul and Lenny Zakatek and recorded two of their songs: "Get Your Gun" and "Gotta Runaway", which were released as Zakatek on Bell Records.

Cox died in Maó, Menorca, on 19 March 2026, at the age of 89.

== Collaborations ==
- Alexis Korner - Sky High (1966)
- Alexis Korner - I Wonder Who? (1967)
- Alexis Korner - Bootleg Him! (1972)
- Alexis Korner - The BBC Radio Sessions (1994)
- Ashton & Lord - First of the Big Bands (1974)
- Bee Gees - Cucumber Castle (1970)
- Bert Jansch - Birthday Blues (1968)
- Bread, Love & Dreams - Amaryllis (1971)
- Charles Aznavour - Aznavour Live 4: Olympia (1980)
- Cleo Laine - Return to Carnegie (1976)
- Damian Halloran and Maria Millward - Great Stories and Songs (2002)
- Dana Gillespie - Weren't Born a Man (1973)
- David Bowie - Space Oddity (1969)
- Digby Fairweather - "Song for Snady"
- Duffy Power - Little Boy Blue (1965–67)
- Duffy Power - Sky Blues (Rare Radio Sessions, 1968–94)
- Duffy Power - Innovations (1970)
- Elton John - Elton John (1970)
- Elton John - Madman Across the Water (1971)
- Fishbaugh Fishbaugh Zorn - Fishbaugh Fishbaugh & Zorn (1972)
- George Martin - Live and Let Die (Soundtrack, 1973)
- Harold McNair - Fence (1970)
- Harvey Andrews - Friends of Mine (1973)
- Jade - Fly on Strangewings (1970)
- Jan & Lorraine - Gypsy People (1969)
- John Dawson - Friend of Mine (1975)
- John Renbourn - Sir John Alot of Merrie Englandes Musyk Thyng & Ye Grene Knyghte (1968)
- John Renbourn - Lady and the Unicorn (1970)
- John Renbourn - Faro Annie (1971)
- John Williams - Changes (1971)
- Lesley Duncan - Sing Children Sing (1971)
- Linda Lewis - Say No More (1971)
- Long John Baldry - Good to Be Alive (1976)
- Lynsey de Paul - Surprise (1973)
- Lynsey de Paul - Taste Me...Don't Waste Me (1974)
- Marian Segal - Fly on Strange Wings
- Mike Batt - Schizophonia (1977)
- Mike Silver - Troubadour (1973)
- Patrick and Matrix Yandall - That Feels Nice! (1993)
- Pete Atkin - The Road of Silk (1974)
- Philwit & Pegasus - Philwit & Pegasus (1970)
- Ray Warleigh - First Album (1969)
- Rick Springfield - Comic Book Heroes (1974)
- Rupert Hine - Pick Up a Bone (1971)
- Scott Walker - Stretch (1973)
- Scott Walker - We Had It All (1974)
- Shawn Brothers - Follow Me (1974)
- Shirley Collins - Within Sound Box Set (1970)
- Shirley & Dolly Collins - Love, Death and The Lady (1970)
- The Sallyangie - Children of the Sun (1969)
- Therapy - Almanac (1972)
- Tudor Lodge - Tudor Lodge (1971)
- Wally Whyton - It's Me Mum
