= Odessa (Bee Gees album) =

Studio album by the Bee Gees
- Released: February 1969
- Recorded: 12 July – December 1968
- Studio: IBC (London); Atlantic (New York); Trident (London)
- Genre: Pop; baroque pop; chamber pop; progressive pop; country
- Length: 63:49
- Label: Polydor
- Producer: Robert Stigwood, Bee Gees

The Bee Gees chronology
Idea (1968)	Odessa (1969)	Cucumber Castle (1970)

Singles from Odessa
- 1. "First of May” b/w “Lamplight" Released: January 1969

Odessa is the sixth studio album by the Bee Gees, a double vinyl LP released in February 1969 in the US and March 1969 in the UK, initially in an opulent red flocked cover with gold lettering. Despite reaching the UK top ten and the US top 20, the album was not particularly well-received, though now is regarded by many as the most significant of the group's 1960s albums. An ambitious project, originally intended as a concept album on the loss of a fictional ship in 1899, it created tension and disagreements in the band regarding the work's direction; finally, a dispute over which song to release as a single led to Robin Gibb temporarily leaving the group.

Released by Polydor Records in the UK and Atco Records in the US, Odessa was the group's fourth album released internationally, and their only double album of original music. It would be the final Bee Gees album to include guitarist Vince Melouney. The album includes the 1969 hit single "First of May" (UK no. 6 / US no. 37) and notable tracks such as "Lamplight", "Marley Purt Drive" and "Melody Fair", the latter of which features on the 1973 compilation Best of Bee Gees Vol. 2.

The album was reissued as a single disc in September 1976 when interest was revived in the Bee Gees' career. Since then the album has gained increasing critical acclaim. It was reissued again in January 2009, as a deluxe three-disc set, and is included in 1001 Albums You Must Hear Before You Die.

== Origins and recording ==
The originally intended name for the album was An American Opera. This later became Masterpeace and finally Odessa.

Colin Petersen recalls about the country influence on Odessa. "It was my idea that we do that sort of thing, and Maurice is the one who will take more time out to listen to what I have to say, although within the group, the okay has to come from Barry". Their manager Robert Stigwood said, "Barry is the Bee Gees coordinator, I used the word advisedly, as there is no leader of the group as such. He has a tremendous feel for soul music a la his composing work for The Marbles, but he is also a fantastic solo singer in his own right".

The first song recorded for the album was "I Laugh in Your Face" on 12 July 1968, the same day the group recorded "I've Gotta Get a Message to You" (released from the American version of the group's fifth album Idea). After recording eight songs for the album, guitarist Vince Melouney left the group amicably and joined the group Fanny Adams, wanting to pursue a more bluesy direction.

A reel tape of mono mixes dated 24 November 1968 has "Odessa (City on the Black Sea)", "First of May" and "Melody Fair" called a "rough mix with orchestra". Therefore, about as soon as they returned to the studio, they were with Bill Shepherd arranging and conducting orchestral tracks to complete the album. This puts the re-make of "First of May" early in the November sessions, yet the song would be the last Bee Gees band session for the album. However, after recording "First of May", the instrumental tracks, "Seven Seas Symphony", "With All Nations" and "The British Opera" were recorded by Bill Shepherd. Also done somewhere around here are the final vocals for the New York songs and the added organ part for "Edison".

== Release ==
Odessa was initially released on Polydor Records in the United Kingdom and Atco Records in the United States in a red flocked cover with a gold lettering to the group's name and label symbol stamped in gold on the front and nothing but the flocking on the back. The gatefold has a large dotted image of people leaving a ship in a lifeboat. There are no photographs of the group and they are not named except as to all songs being written by B, R & M Gibb. Due to the high cost of production, as well as allergic reactions among workers during assembly, this design was discontinued.

Prior to release, there were disagreements over which song was to be released as a single, when the Robin-led "Lamplight" lost out to "First of May", a Barry solo vocal. This led to Robin Gibb leaving the group in early 1969, though he would rejoin the group in August 1970. The split was a result of months of animosity, in relation to the album's final mix. As Barry explained:

Everything got out of hand and we didn't know which way we were heading. We'd never really finished the album. It was our own production and we were very proud of it, but it all turned out different. It marked a period of breaking up and we weren't talking to each other, so we weren't in the studio together half the time and weren't as friendly toward each other. The recording took three or four months which was a long time in those days. Bee Gees 1st was done in a month. It would be nice to re-master the album once and as a bonus maybe do a live version of some of the songs.

The last performances of the group including Robin were in early 1969, when they performed "First of May" (they also performed "I Started a Joke") on The Tom Jones Show (21 February) and Top of the Pops (6 March). Robin left the band on 15 March and made his decision public on 19 March. Robin told Mojo magazine in 2003 about his departure from the band after the release of Odessa, saying "We had egos".

Maurice later described the album as 'heavy'. "People thought it was an in-depth album", he recalled, "like, 'What do they mean by those lyrics?' and 'What's this all about?' There's all sorts of different areas on it. It went up and down in places, but a lot of people regard it as our Sgt. Pepper. To us, I don't think it was the best album we made, but the main title 'Odessa' I loved". Barry responded to Maurice saying, "I guess I have strong personal feelings about it because it was a time when the group was splitting up".

In July 1969, "Marley Purt Drive" was released as a single, backed with "Melody Fair" only in South Africa.

== Reception ==
Professional ratings
Review scores
Source	Rating
AllMusic	4.5/5 stars
Glorious Noise	recommended
Pitchfork	7.2/10
Rolling Stone	3.5/5 stars
The Rolling Stone Album Guide	3/5 stars
Tiny Mix Tapes	5/5 stars

The album was not well received by the public or the music press on release, and led to a decline in the band's fortunes. The album has since received critical acclaim, and is regarded by many reviewers as their most significant Sixties release, and has been re-released in a deluxe three CD set.

== Reissues ==
The album was reissued in 1976 as an edited single-disc album with a plain red cover on RSO Records. The 1976 single LP reissue deleted tracks 3, 5, 7–9, 12, and 17. Some early CD and cassette editions also omitted the track "With All Nations (International Anthem)". On 13 January 2009, Reprise Records released a deluxe remaster of the album, as prepared by Rhino Records, with three discs containing, respectively, the album in stereo, the album in mono and selected rarities. The third disc, entitled Sketches for Odessa featured demos of the songs plus a vocal take of "With All Nations (International Anthem)" and the previously unissued tracks "Nobody's Someone" and "Pity". This edition restored the red flocking originally found on the LP.

In 1970 it was reissued in the U.K. on the budget Polydor label ‘99’ as two LP’s. Record one was called Marley Purt Drive and the record two as Sound of Love. The original track running orders were retained.

== Track listing ==
All tracks written and composed by Barry, Robin and Maurice Gibb.

Side one
No.	Title	Lead vocals	Length
1.	"Odessa (City on the Black Sea)"	Robin	7:33
2.	"You'll Never See My Face Again"	Barry	4:16
3.	"Black Diamond"	Robin	3:27
Total length:			15:16

Side two
No.	Title	Lead vocals	Length
1.	"Marley Purt Drive"	Barry	4:26
2.	"Edison"	Robin and Barry	3:07
3.	"Melody Fair"	Barry and Maurice	3:48
4.	"Suddenly"	Maurice	2:29
5.	"Whisper Whisper"	Barry	3:24
Total length:			17:14

Side three
No.	Title	Lead vocals	Length
1.	"Lamplight"	Robin	4:47
2.	"Sound of Love"	Barry	3:27
3.	"Give Your Best"	Barry	3:26
4.	"Seven Seas Symphony"	Instrumental	4:09
5.	"With All Nations (International Anthem)"	Instrumental	1:46
Total length:			17:35

Side four
No.	Title	Lead vocals	Length
1.	"I Laugh in Your Face"	Barry and Robin	4:09
2.	"Never Say Never Again"	Barry	3:28
3.	"First of May"	Barry	2:50
4.	"The British Opera"	Instrumental	3:17
Total length:			13:44

Deluxe edition

On 13 January 2009, Reprise Records released a 3-CD set of Odessa, complete with remastered stereo and mono version of all 17 tracks, plus a bonus third disc with demos, alternate version, and three unreleased tracks. To date, Odessa was the last album to receive the deluxe remaster treatment with extensive sleeve notes, and the status of the re-release program is unknown.

Deluxe edition track listing

Disc 1: stereo / Disc 2: mono

1. Odessa (City on the Black Sea)
2. You'll Never See My Face Again
3. Black Diamond
4. Marley Purt Drive
5. Edison
6. Melody Fair
7. Suddenly
8. Whisper Whisper
9. Lamplight
10. Sound of Love
11. Give Your Best
12. Seven Seas Symphony
13. With All Nations (International Anthem)
14. I Laugh in Your Face
15. Never Say Never Again
16. First of May
17. The British Opera

Disc 3: "Sketches for Odessa" [all tracks previously unissued]

1. Odessa (Demo)
2. You'll Never See My Face Again" (Alternate Mix)
3. Black Diamond (Demo)
4. Marley Purt Drive (Alternate Mix)
5. Barbara Came To Stay
6. Edison (Alternate Mix)
7. Melody Fair (Demo)
8. Melody Fair (Alternate Mix)
9. Suddenly (Alternate Mix)
10. Whisper Whisper – Part Two (Alternate Version)
11. Lamplight (Demo)
12. Lamplight (Alternate Version)
13. Sound of Love (Alternate Mix)
14. Give Your Best (Alternate Mix)
15. Seven Seas Symphony (Demo)
16. With All Nations (International Anthem) (Vocal Version)
17. I Laugh in Your Face (Alternate Mix)
18. Never Say Never Again (Alternate Mix)
19. First of May (Demo)
20. First of May (Alternate Mix)
21. Nobody's Someone
22. Pity
23. Odessa Promotional Spot

== Personnel ==
Sourced from Joseph Brennan.

Bee Gees

- Barry Gibb – lead vocals, harmony and backing vocals, rhythm guitar
- Robin Gibb – lead vocals, harmony and backing vocals, piano, Mellotron
- Maurice Gibb – harmony and backing vocals, bass, piano, guitar, Mellotron, lead vocals on "Melody Fair" and “Suddenly”
- Vince Melouney – lead guitar on "Marley Purt Drive," "Edison," "Whisper Whisper", "Sound of Love," "Give Your Best," and "I Laugh In Your Face"
- Colin Petersen – drums

Additional musicians

- Bill Keith – banjo on "Marley Purt Drive" and "Give Your Best"
- Tex Logan – fiddle on "Give Your Best"
- Paul Buckmaster – cello on "Odessa (City on the Black Sea)"

Production staff

- Robert Stigwood – producer
- Bee Gees – producers
- Adrian Barber – sound engineer

== Charts ==
=== Weekly charts ===
Chart (1969)	Position
Australian Kent Music Report	13
Canadian RPM Albums Chart	7
French SNEP Albums Chart	5
Spanish Albums Chart	3
UK Albums Chart	10
US Billboard 200	20
West German Media Control Albums Chart	4

=== Year-end charts ===
Chart (1969)	Position
French Albums Chart	45
US Billboard Pop Albums	72
