= Kenny Clayton =

British music producer and pianist (1936–2022)

- Born: 9 May 1936; Edmonton, North London, England
- Died: 10 October 2022 (aged 86)
- Education: Trinity College of Music
- Genre: Jazz
- Occupations: Record producer, arranger, conductor, musician
- Instruments: Piano
- Label: EMI/Parlophone

Kenny Clayton (9 May 1936 – 10 October 2022) was a British record producer, arranger, conductor and jazz pianist. He wrote numerous musical scores for film and stage.

== Life and career ==
Clayton was born in Edmonton NorthL London on 9 May 1936. He studied piano at the Trinity College of Music in London. In the late 1950s, by the age of twenty-one, Clayton firmly established himself as a working pianist and accompanied Alma Cogan and Terry Dene on a tour of the Empire Theatres, as well as working in cabaret with Shani Wallis, Jeannie Carson, Libby Morris, and Joan Turner.

Having achieved success on the popular UK variety circuit, Clayton was quickly signed to EMI/Parlophone and released his first single, "Tenerife," which he introduced on the British TV music series Thank Your Lucky Stars. He also was responsible for the arrangement of Carlo Dini's "Two People" which was written by Don Black and was released on Parlophone. Throughout the 1960s and 1970s, he was musical director and arranger for a number of popular singers, including Dick Haymes, Shirley Bassey, Matt Monro, Robin Gibb, Cilla Black, Charles Aznavour, Sacha Distel, and Roger Whittaker. He was Petula Clark's musical director and arranger from 1962 until 2005, and also performed with his jazz/swing combo, the Kenny Clayton Trio. In July 1967, Clayton accompanied Matt Monro at the 40 Thieves Club in Hamilton, Bermuda.

== Film and stage works ==
As a composer, Clayton scored the films The Ragman's Daughter (1972), The Pied Piper (1972), The 14 (1973), The Savage Hunt (1980), and the final Morecambe and Wise project, Night Train to Murder (1984).

Clayton's stage credits included the scores for Bertie (with Mike Margolis), Oedipus, Ring Your Mother, Box, and The Mistress (with Bruce Montague). Clayton's theatre credits as musical director and arranger include The Sound of Music and Someone like You (both with Petula Clark), No Strings, Privates on Parade, Billy, Song and Dance, and Nightingale.

Clayton composed, scored and recorded incidental music for spoken word albums including such titles as The Secret Garden (read by Glenda Jackson), A Journey to the Center of the Earth (read by Tom Baker), Puckoon (read by Spike Milligan), and Black Beauty (read by Angela Rippon). For Peter O'Toole, he composed incidental music to accompany his readings of Shakespearean ballads and sonnets.

In television, Clayton worked as a musical director and accompanist on several series and specials, including Shirley Bassey and Count Basie's Something Special (for NBC), Petula Clark's Traces of Love (for ATV), The Vocal Touch - Anita Harris (for BBC2), and the original series Company & Co (for BBC2), Coming Next (for Channel 4), and Lily Live (for LWT).

The Royal Philharmonic Orchestra commissioned him to write the nine-minute tone poem, Il Palio Di Siena.

Clayton's later albums included Kenny Clayton Plays Tribute to Petula Clark & Matt Monro, which was released on 21 November 2005. The Kenny Clayton Trio released two albums of songs associated with Frank Sinatra, Nice 'n Easy and All the Way.

Clayton divided his time between London and Menorca. In 2011 and 2012, he played on several occasions at the Alley Cat venue in Denmark Street, London, with his long-time friend, the crooner Paul Ryan. He died on 10 October 2022, at the age of 86.
