= Turn Around, Look at Us =

Compilation album by Bee Gees
- Released: 1967
- Recorded: 1963–1966
- Genre: Rock
- Language: English
- Label: Festival Records
- Producer: Robert Iredale, Nat Kipner

Bee Gees chronology
Turn Around, Look at Us (1967)	Rare, Precious and Beautiful (1968)

Turn Around, Look at Us was the first compilation album released by the Bee Gees in 1967 on Festival Records. It was released only in Australia and New Zealand. The album effectively served as a mop-up compilation, featuring all the group's single tracks that had not been available on their two Australian albums, though three tracks from The Bee Gees Sing and Play 14 Barry Gibb Songs made repeat appearances.

== Track listing ==
All tracks are written by Barry Gibb except where noted

Side one
No.	Title	Writer(s)	Lead vocals	Length
1.	"Turn Around, Look at Me" (1964 single A-side)	Jerry Capehart	Barry	2:16
2.	"The Battle of the Blue and the Grey" (1963 single A-side)		Barry	2:05
3.	"The Three Kisses of Love" (1963 single B-side to The Battle of the Blue and the Grey)		Barry	1:46
4.	"(Theme From) The Travels of Jamie McPheeters" (1964 single B-side to Turn Around, Look at Me)	Jerry Winn, Leigh Harline	Barry	1:51
5.	"Every Day I Have to Cry" (1965 single A-side)	Arthur Alexander	Barry	2:05
6.	"I Want Home" (1966 single A-side)		Barry	2:24

Side two
No.	Title	Writer(s)	Lead vocal(s)	Length
1.	"Cherry Red" (1966 single B-side to I Want Home)		Barry, Robin	3:07
2.	"All of My Life" (1966 single B-side to Monday's Rain)		Barry	2:36
3.	"I Am the World" (1966 single B-side to Spicks and Specks)	Robin Gibb	Robin	2:35
4.	"I Was a Lover, a Leader of Men" (1965 single A-side)		Barry	3:35
5.	"Wine and Women" (1965 single A-side)		Barry, Robin	2:52
6.	"Peace of Mind" (1964 single A-side)		Barry	2:20
