= Best of Bee Gees =

Compilation album by Bee Gees
- Released: June 1969 (United States); October 1969 (United Kingdom)
- Genre: Pop
- Length: 37:34
- Label: Polydor (United Kingdom); Atco (United States)
- Producer: Robert Stigwood, Bee Gees, Ossie Byrne

Bee Gees albums chronology
Rare, Precious and Beautiful, Volume 2 (1968)	Best of Bee Gees (1969)	Inception/Nostalgia (1970)

Professional ratings
Review scores
Source	Rating
AllMusic	5/5 stars
The Rolling Stone Album Guide	3/5 stars

Best of Bee Gees is a 1969 compilation album by the English-Australian rock band Bee Gees. It was their first international greatest hits album. It featured their singles from 1966 to 1969 with the exception of the band's 1968 single "Jumbo".

== History ==
The following songs in this compilation from 1966-1969 were very popular worldwide and were picked up by many casual fans who owned no other Bee Gees album. The compilation includes the US singles "Holiday" and "I Started a Joke." However, the 1968 song "Jumbo" that was also released as a single was not included. This was the first LP appearance of "Words" and first LP appearance outside North America of "I've Gotta Get a Message to You." Both songs were presented in stereo on the Atco version and in mono elsewhere. Many fans consider the songs from Bee Gees' 1st to sound better here than on the original album.

== Release ==
With the release of this compilation, Robin Gibb had left the group after the previous release, Odessa, and this compilation was released while the remaining Bee Gees worked on their next album, Cucumber Castle. Guitarist Vince Melouney, although playing guitar on most of the tracks, is not pictured on the front or back cover as he had departed the group a year earlier. The cover of the album features only the four members and was taken in early 1967 before Melouney joined the band. The back cover is from the winter of 1968–1969. The original 1969 vinyl release included the Bee Gees' 1966 Australian top ten hit "Spicks and Specks", but due to licensing issues with Festival Records in Australia, the group's 1969 hit "Tomorrow Tomorrow" was substituted on the Polydor CD release. The album is noted by fans for its bad stereo mix of the song "Words", which increased the vocals so much that the percussion was lost in the background. This is the only album/CD with this mix. All future compilations have a more balanced stereo mix.

The first issue in Germany was in August 1969, and had the song "Please Read Me" on the disc by mistake where "I Can't See Nobody" belongs. This was fixed a month later.

With the release of Their Greatest Hits: The Record in 2001, this CD went out of print for several years until Rhino reissued it in November 2008 with the same tracks as the Polydor CD. Three of the thirteen tracks from the combined vinyl/CD Best of Bee Gees do not appear amongst the forty seven tracks on Their Greatest Hits: The Record: "I Can't See Nobody" and "Every Christian Lion Hearted Man Will Show You" had only actually been the B-sides of other hits on Best of Bee Gees, while "Tomorrow, Tomorrow" had charted but had never reached the top 20 in the charts of the UK, USA nor Australia.

== Legacy ==
In October 2010, it was listed at No. 16 in the book, 100 Best Australian Albums.

Noel Gallagher commented that Best of Bee Gees is one of his favourite albums and that it inspired the cover art of his band High Flying Birds' greatest hits album, Back the Way We Came: Vol. 1 (2011–2021).

== Track listing ==
All songs written by Barry, Robin & Maurice Gibb except where noted.

Side 1
No.	Title	Original album	Length
1.	"Holiday" (Barry Gibb, Robin Gibb)	Bee Gees' 1st, August 1967	2:53
2.	"I've Gotta Get a Message to You"	UK: Single only, September 1968; US: Idea, September 1968	2:59
3.	"I Can't See Nobody" (Barry Gibb, Robin Gibb)	Bee Gees' 1st	3:45
4.	"Words"	Single, January 1968	3:13
5.	"I Started a Joke"	Idea	3:07
6.	"Spicks and Specks" (Barry Gibb)	UK: Spicks and Specks, November 1966; US: Rare, Precious and Beautiful, 1968	2:52

Side 2
No.	Title	Original album	Length
1.	"First of May"	Odessa, March 1969	2:48
2.	"World"	Horizontal, February 1968	3:13
3.	"Massachusetts"	Horizontal	2:23
4.	"To Love Somebody" (Barry Gibb, Robin Gibb)	Bee Gees' 1st	3:00
5.	"Every Christian Lion Hearted Man Will Show You"	Bee Gees' 1st	3:38
6.	"New York Mining Disaster 1941" (Barry Gibb, Robin Gibb)	Bee Gees' 1st	2:09

== Personnel ==
- Barry Gibb — Lead vocals (1, 2, 4, 6–8 & 10), backing vocals (5, 6 & 9), acoustic guitar, electric guitar
- Robin Gibb — Lead vocals (1–3, 5, 9 & 10), backing vocals (10 & 12)
- Maurice Gibb — Bass guitar, acoustic guitar, electric guitar, piano, organ, mellotron, harpsichord, backing vocals
- Colin Petersen — drums
- Vince Melouney — electric guitar, lead guitar

== Chart performance ==
Year	Chart	Position
1969	Australian Kent Music Report Albums Chart	6
1969	Billboard Albums Chart	9
1969	Germany Media Control Charts	26
1969	United Kingdom Albums Chart	7
1969	Canadian Top 100 Albums	5

== Certifications ==
Region	Certification	Certified units/sales
Canada (Music Canada)	2× Platinum	200,000^{^}
New Zealand (RMNZ)	Gold	
United States (RIAA)	Gold	500,000^{^}
Summaries
South America	—	200,000
^{^} Shipments figures based on certification alone.
