= Rare, Precious and Beautiful, Volume 2 =

Compilation album by Bee Gees
- Released: 1968
- Recorded: 1963–1966
- Genre: Rock
- Length: 28:45
- Label: Polydor (United Kingdom); Atco (United States); Karussell (Germany)
- Producer: Robert Iredale, Bill Shepherd, Nat Kipner

Bee Gees compilations chronology
Rare, Precious and Beautiful (1968)	Rare, Precious and Beautiful, Volume 2 (1968)	Massachusetts (1968)

Rare, Precious and Beautiful, Volume 2 is a compilation released by the Bee Gees in 1968 on Polydor Records in the UK and Karussell Records in Germany. The album was released in the US on Atco Records in 1970. The songs were recorded between 1963 and 1966.

The release was followed by a Volume 3.

== Track listing ==
All tracks are written by Barry Gibb except where noted.

Side one
No.	Title	Writer(s)	Notes	Length
1.	"I Was a Lover, a Leader of Men"		1965 single	3:35
2.	"Follow the Wind"		1965 B-side to "Wine and Women"	2:07
3.	"Claustrophobia"		1964 single	2:14
4.	"Theme from The Travels of Jaimie McPheeters"	Winn, Harline	1964 B-side to "Turn Around, Look at Me"	1:51
5.	"Everyday I Have to Cry"	Alexander	1965 single	2:05
6.	"Take Hold of That Star"		1965 album track, debut album	2:38

Side two
No.	Title	Notes	Length
1.	"Could It Be"	1964 B-side to "Claustrophobia"	2:03
2.	"To Be or Not to Be"	1965 album track, debut album	2:10
3.	"The Three Kisses of Love"	1963 B-Side of "The Battle of the Blue and the Grey"	1:46
4.	"Cherry Red"	1966 B-Side to "I Want Home"	3:07
5.	"All of My Life"	1966 B-Side to "Monday's Rain"	2:36
6.	"Don't Say Goodbye"	1964 B-Side of "Peace of Mind"	2:23
