= New York Mining Disaster 1941 (EP) =

EP by Bee Gees
- Released: 1967
- Recorded: 13, 16 March – 21 April 1967
- Studio: IBC (London)
- Genre: Psychedelic rock; psychedelic pop
- Label: Spin
- Producer: Robert Stigwood; Ossie Byrne

Bee Gees EP chronology
The Bee Gees (1963)	New York Mining Disaster 1941 (1967)	Words (1968)

New York Mining Disaster 1941 was released on Spin Records by the Bee Gees in 1967. It was their second EP and, like their first EP, was released only in Australia. All of the songs on this EP were originally released on their third LP Bee Gees' 1st.

== Track listing ==
All songs written and composed by Robin Gibb and Barry Gibb.

Side one

- "New York Mining Disaster 1941" – 2:09
- "I Can't See Nobody" – 3:45

Side two

- "Turn of the Century" – 2:25
- "Holiday" – 2:53

== Personnel ==
- Robin Gibb – pump organ, lead vocals on "I Can't See Nobody" and "New York Mining Disaster 1941", backing vocals
- Barry Gibb – rhythm guitar, lead vocals on "Turn of the Century" and "Holiday", backing vocals
- Maurice Gibb – bass, rhythm guitar, piano, Hammond organ, harpsichord, mellotron, backing vocals
- Vince Melouney – lead guitar
- Colin Petersen – drums
- Phil Dennys – orchestral arrangement on "New York Mining Disaster 1941"
- Bill Shepherd – orchestral arrangement
- Mike Claydon – engineer
