= I Am the World =

Single by Bee Gees
- A-side: "Spicks and Specks"
- Released: September 1966 (Australia); February 1967 (United Kingdom)
- Recorded: June–July 1966
- Genre: Pop, baroque pop
- Length: 2:35
- Label: Spin (Australia); Polydor (United Kingdom)
- Songwriter: Robin Gibb
- Producers: Nat Kipner, Ossie Byrne

Bee Gees flipsides singles chronology
"All of My Life" (1966)	"I Am the World" (1966)	"Big Chance" (1967)

"I Am the World" is a song recorded by the Bee Gees, written and sung by Robin Gibb. It was released as the B-side of "Spicks and Specks". Later, it was included on the compilation Rare, Precious and Beautiful, Vol. 3 in 1969. It featured trumpet played by Geoff Grant. Its CD version was released in 1998 on the compilation Brilliant from Birth.

== Recording ==
It was the last recorded on the last month of Spicks and Specks sessions which was started in June until July 1966, recorded the same time as the title track. After this song, they recorded a number of songs which was later included on Inception/Nostalgia (1970). Trumpeter Geoff Grant recalls "I Am the World" along with four songs "Spicks and Specks", "All by Myself" and "The Storm" that he was working three nights recording that songs. It was one of the first songs to be written by Robin alone.

=== Personnel ===
- Robin Gibb — lead vocals
- Maurice Gibb — bass, piano, guitar
- Barry Gibb - guitar
- Colin Petersen — drums
- Geoff Grant — trumpet
- Uncredited musicians — horns

== Robin Gibb version ==
"I Am the World"

Single by Robin Gibb

from the album 50 St. Catherine's Drive
- Released: 11 September 2014
- Recorded: 2008–2014
- Length: 3:57
- Label: Rhino
- Songwriters: Robin Gibb; Peter-John Vettese
- Producer: Peter-John Vettese

Robin Gibb singles chronology
"Don't Cry Alone" (2012)	"I Am the World" (2014)	"Days of Wine and Roses" (2014)

Robin Gibb recorded his own version in 2008. It was released on his posthumous album 50 St. Catherine's Drive (2014). It was rewritten with Peter-John Vettese who produced the album. It was chosen as the album's first single released on 11 September 2014 and was added to BBC Radio 2 playlist.

In the UK, Reprise Records issued a promotional single of "I Am the World".

== Cover versions ==
- Johnny Young (a friend of the Gibbs) covered this song and used as the B-side of "Craise Finton Kirk Royal Academy of Arts" (the song was originally performed by the Bee Gees and first released on the album Bee Gees' 1st). Young's version was released by Polydor in the United Kingdom and Clarion Records in Australia in August 1967.
- Bev Harrell covered "I Am the World" released as the B-side of "One Way Ticket" in October 1968.
- Canadian singer Renée Martel recorded a French-language cover of the song (as "Je suis la terre") in 1971, featured on her album Mon Roman D'Amour that year.
