= Where Are You (Bee Gees song) =

Song by the Bee Gees

from the album Spicks and Specks
- Released: November 1966
- Recorded: April–May 1966
- Length: 2:10
- Label: Spin
- Songwriter(s): Maurice Gibb
- Producer(s): Nat Kipner

"Where Are You" is a song by the Bee Gees, written by Maurice Gibb. It marked his debut as a lead vocalist and solo composer. It was included on the 1966 album Spicks and Specks. In 1968, it was released in the US.

== Origin ==
It was written by Maurice Gibb in 1966 and was his first to appear on any Bee Gees albums. It was recorded around April and May 1966.

Another Maurice composition from that year, "All by Myself" was released in 1970 on Inception/Nostalgia.

The song had drawn Kipner's attention to Maurice's potential as a more than competent songwriter, Maurice generally felt more comfortable writing the music than the words.

== Personnel ==
- Maurice Gibb — lead vocals, acoustic guitar, bass guitar
- Barry Gibb — acoustic guitar, backing vocals
- Robin Gibb — backing vocals
- Colin Petersen — drums
- John Robinson — bass guitar

== Releases ==
Country	Title
Australia	Spicks and Specks: Label: Spin; Released: November 1966; Format: LP
All Countries	Rare, Precious and Beautiful: Label: Polydor, Atco (US/Canada); Released: November 1968; Format: LP
All Countries	Brilliant from Birth: Label: Spin; Released: 25 August 1998; Format: LP
All Countries	In the Beginning: Label: Goldies; Released: 30 December 2003
Australia	The Festival Album Collection: 1965-1967: Label: Festival; Released: 12 February 2013

== Mike Furber version ==
"Where Are You"

Single by Mike Furber

from the album Where Are You
- B-side: "Second Hand People"
- Released: December 1966
- Label: Kommotion
- Songwriter(s): Maurice Gibb

Mike Furber singles chronology
"You" (1966)	"Where Are You" (1966)	"I'm So Glad" (1967)

The Mike Furber version of "Where Are You" credits Barry Gibb as the songwriter (instead of the original songwriter Maurice Gibb). Furber's version was released in December 1966 by Kommotion Records only in Australia and was released on the EP of the same name. The backing band was Max Merritt and the Meteors, with the Gibb brothers singing backup vocals. Furber's version reached No. 93 in the Australia Kent Music Report charts.
