= Craise Finton Kirk Royal Academy of Arts =

Original song written and composed by Barry Gibb and Robin Gibb

Song by Bee Gees

from the album Bee Gees' 1st
- Released: 14 July 1967 (United Kingdom); 9 August 1967 (United Kingdom)
- Recorded: 21 March 1967
- Genre: Music hall
- Length: 2:16
- Label: Polydor; Atco (United States)
- Songwriters: Barry Gibb, Robin Gibb
- Producers: Robert Stigwood, Ossie Byrne

"Craise Finton Kirk Royal Academy of Arts"

Single by Johnny Young
- B-side: "I Am the World"
- Released: August 1967
- Recorded: July 1967
- Genre: Pop
- Length: 2:29
- Label: Polydor
- Songwriters: Barry Gibb, Robin Gibb
- Producer: Robert Stigwood

Johnny Young singles chronology
"Lady" (1967)	"Craise Finton Kirk Royal Academy of Arts" (1967)	"Every Christian Lion Hearted Man Will Show You" (1967)

"Craise Finton Kirk Royal Academy of Arts" is a song by the Bee Gees on the album Bee Gees' 1st. Written by Barry and Robin Gibb, it closes the first side of the album. An alternate take was released in 2006 on The Studio Albums 1967-1968. This track was recorded on March 21 after the orchestral dubbing for the other album tracks had been laid down. Featuring only piano and voice, the song stands in stark contrast to the rest of the album.

== Personnel ==
- Robin Gibb — lead and harmony vocal
- Maurice Gibb — piano
- Robert Stigwood — producer
- Ossie Byrne — producer

== Johnny Young version ==
Later, it was covered by Australian singer Johnny Young, a friend of the Bee Gees. His version was recorded in July 1967 at IBC Studios, and Barry, Robin and Maurice sang backup. The track was conducted by Bill Shepherd and produced by Robert Stigwood. It was issued as a single on Polydor Records in UK and Clarion Records in Australia, in August 1967. The B-side was another Bee Gees song "I Am the World", written by Robin Gibb in 1966.

Young's version of this song had been on the Radio London playlist for the final four weeks of the station's life. The song was one of the most popular tracks featured on Big L'97. Mike Ahern cited this track as "being on Caroline's pay-for-play list". The song reached #14 at the Go-Set charts in Melbourne and on Kent Music Report in Sydney.

=== Chart performance ===
Chart (1967)	Peak position
Australia Go-Set (Melbourne)	14
Australian Kent Music Report (Sydney)	25
