= Spicks and Specks =

The term Spicks and Specks may refer to

- Spicks and Specks (album), a 1966 album by The Bee Gees
- "Spicks and Specks" (song), a 1966 song by The Bee Gees
- Spicks and Specks (TV series), an Australian music-themed television quiz show (named after the Bee Gees song)
