= Town of Tuxley Toymaker, Part 1 =

Single by Jon Blanchfield
- A-side: "Upstairs, Downstairs"
- Released: February 1967
- Recorded: November or December 1966 at St. Clair Studio, Hurstville
- Genre: Psychedelic pop, baroque pop
- Length: 3:28
- Label: Leedon
- Songwriter: Barry, Robin & Maurice Gibb
- Producer: Nat Kipner

"Town of Tuxley Toymaker, Part 1"

Single by Billy J. Kramer
- B-side: "Chinese Girl"
- Released: April 1967
- Recorded: 4 March 1967
- Genre: Psychedelic pop, baroque pop
- Length: 3:28
- Label: Reaction
- Songwriter: Barry, Robin & Maurice Gibb
- Producer: Robert Stigwood

"Town of Tuxley Toymaker, Part One" is a song written by Barry, Robin and Maurice Gibb in Australia in 1966. It was recorded by Jon Blanchfield in 1966, Billy J. Kramer in 1967 and Shane (New Zealand) in 1968.

It was recorded first by Jon Blanchfield. His version was only released in Australia as a B-side of the A-side single "Upstairs, Downstairs", a song also written by Barry, Robin and Maurice. The song was recorded in November or December 1966 at St. Clair Studio, Hurstville in Australia. Blanchfield also adds that Barry wrote "Coalman" around the same time. The melody was inspired by "Matchmaker" from Fiddler on the Roof. It was released as a single in February 1967, when the Bee Gees were in England, and they recorded another version of the song with Billy J. Kramer. The Gibb brothers also participated on this song. The Blanchfield version was included on the various artists compilation called Assault The Vaults: Rare Australian Cover Versions Of The Brothers Gibb.

== Billy J. Kramer version ==
Kramer's version was recorded on 4 March 1967, the Gibb brothers with Colin Petersen. It was also the Bee Gees' first recording session, after they returned in England, the song was recorded at IBC Studios. and Kramer recalled:

What happened was, Brian Epstein told said to me that George Martin was very tied up with a lot of projects and would I mind doing a record with Robert Stigwood. I had a meeting with Robert, and he played me Bee Gees' tapes, demo's, all sorts of things that they'd written 'Spicks and Specks' things like that. Then I think I had a copy sent to me of 'Town of Tuxley Toymaker (Part One)'.

== Shane version ==
New Zealand singer Shane Hales, using his stage name Shane, released a version on the Zodiac label in 1968.

== Personnel ==
The musicians played on the Jon Blanchfield recording were:

- Jon Blanchfield — lead vocals
- Barry Gibb — guitar, background vocals
- Robin Gibb — background vocals
- Maurice Gibb — bass, piano, guitar (12-string)
- Uncredited — drums, horns
- Ossie Byrne — engineer
- Nat Kipner — producer

The musicians played on the Billy J. Kramer recording were:

- Billy J. Kramer — lead vocals
- Barry Gibb — background vocals
- Robin Gibb — background vocals
- Maurice Gibb — background vocals
- Colin Petersen — drums
- Bill Shepherd — orchestral arrangement
