= Close Another Door =

Single by the Bee Gees

from the album Bee Gees' 1st
- A-side: "To Love Somebody"
- Released: June 1967
- Recorded: April 1967
- Studio: Ryemuse, London
- Length: 3:29
- Songwriters: Barry Gibb; Robin Gibb; Maurice Gibb
- Producers: Robert Stigwood; Ossie Byrne

Bee Gees flipsides singles chronology
"I Can't See Nobody" (1967)	"Close Another Door" (1967)	"Every Christian Lion Hearted Man Will Show You" (1967)

"Close Another Door" is a song written by Barry, Robin and Maurice Gibb and recorded by the Bee Gees. It was initially released as the B-side of "To Love Somebody" and later appeared on their 1967 album Bee Gees' 1st.

The lead vocal was by Robin Gibb, joined by Barry Gibb on the chorus. This track was a rock number but near the end of the song it slows down, featuring the orchestral arrangement of Bill Shepherd.

== Background ==
Along with "To Love Somebody", this track was not dated but was recorded around April 1967. It was recorded at Ryemuse Studios in London rather than IBC Studios where the rest of the album was done.

The first verse was sung a cappella while a lengthy cadenza was sung after the last chorus.

The song concerns ageing and an old man in a nursing home.

== Track listing ==
No.	Title	Length
1.	"To Love Somebody" (Barry Gibb, Robin Gibb)	3:02
2.	"Close Another Door" (Barry Gibb, Robin Gibb, Maurice Gibb)	3:29

== Personnel ==
- Robin Gibb — lead vocals
- Barry Gibb — acoustic guitar, lead and backing vocals
- Maurice Gibb — bass and acoustic guitar
- Vince Melouney — electric guitar
- Colin Petersen — drums
- Bill Shepherd — orchestral arrangement
