= You Wouldn't Know =

You Wouldn't Know may refer to:

- You Wouldn't Know (Hellyeah song), 2007
- You Wouldn't Know (Bee Gees song), 1965
- You Wouldn't Know (Chokamkuru Langneh song), 2021
