= The Bee Gees (EP) =

EP by Bee Gees
- Released: September 1963
- Recorded: February and June 1963
- Studio: Festival (Sydney)
- Genre: Beat; doo-wop
- Label: Leedon
- Producer: Robert Iredale

Bee Gees EP chronology
The Bee Gees (1963)	New York Mining Disaster 1941 (1967)

The Bee Gees is the first EP by the Bee Gees, released in September 1963 on the Leedon label only in Australia. The songs were recorded in February and June 1963 in Festival Studios in Sydney.

The EP cover features the three brothers identically dressed in white shirts with dark ties, dark trousers, black winklepicker shoes and tartan waistcoats. The waistcoats are augmented by 'BG' lettering on the left side, which would become a trademark of their television appearances over the next two years.

The A-side of the record featured the songs that made up the group's second single. The B-side did the same with the tracks from their first single.

== Track listing ==
All songs written by Barry Gibb.

Side one

1. "Timber!" – 1:46
2. "Take Hold of That Star" – 2:38

Side two

1. "The Battle of the Blue and the Grey" – 2:05
2. "The Three Kisses of Love" – 1:46

== Value ==
Because of the limited number of records actually pressed, this EP was recently valued at $3,500.00 and the second most valuable release in Australia.
