= Goon Moon =

American rock band

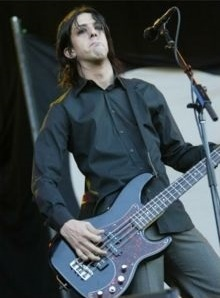
- Goon Moon's Twiggy Ramirez performing in 2007

Background information
- Origin: United States
- Genres: Industrial rock; desert rock; alternative rock; indie rock; experimental rock
- Years active: 2002–present
- Labels: Ipecac, Suicide Squeeze
- Members: Jeordie White; Chris Goss

Goon Moon is an American rock band composed of Jeordie White (also known as Twiggy Ramirez) and Chris Goss. The band released the mini-LP I Got a Brand New Egg Layin' Machine in 2005 and have since recorded a full-length album, Licker's Last Leg, which was released on May 8, 2007. The album features cameos from longtime Goss collaborators Josh Homme and Josh Freese, as well as desert rock mainstay Dave Catching.

== History ==
Shortly after White's 2002 departure from Marilyn Manson, Josh Homme introduced White and Goss, who were longtime fans of each other's work. In 2005, they released a first sampling of their collaborative effort with I Got A Brand New Egg Layin' Machine on Suicide Squeeze Records. The mini-LP offered a collection of ten tracks ranging in style from psychedelia to folk-inspired ballads. White describes Goon Moon's eclectic "anything goes" sound as an opportunity to "explore different options, musically". Experimentation within and across conventional genres carried over to Goon Moon's debut full-length LP on Ipecac Records, Licker's Last Leg, which features a cover of the Bee Gees song "Every Christian Lion Hearted Man Will Show You."

== Members ==
- Jeordie White
- Chris Goss

== Discography ==
- 2005 – I Got a Brand New Egg Layin' Machine (Suicide Squeeze Records)
- 2007 – Licker's Last Leg (Ipecac Recordings)
