= All of My Life (Bee Gees song) =

Single by Bee Gees
- A-side: "Monday's Rain"
- Released: June 1966
- Recorded: April–June 1966
- Studio: St. Clair, Hurstville, Australia
- Length: 2:36
- Label: Spin (Australia); Polydor (UK); Philips (Holland)
- Songwriter: Barry Gibb
- Producer: Nat Kipner

Bee Gees flipsides singles chronology
"Cherry Red" (1966)	"All of My Life" (1966)	"I Am the World" (1966)

"All of My Life" is a song by the English-Australian rock group Bee Gees, written and sung by Barry Gibb, which was used as the B-side of "Monday's Rain". This song was recorded during the sessions for their second album Spicks and Specks and appeared on the early pressings of the album, entitled Monday's Rain as the first song on side two. When the album's name was changed to Spicks and Specks, the song was omitted.

The song eventually saw album release by Atco Records on Rare, Precious and Beautiful, Volume 2, a 1970 album of early recordings by the Gibb brothers, including some recorded with Colin Petersen.

Its debut on CD was released on the compilation Brilliant from Birth, released in 1998 only in Australia. A cover has been done by the Philippine band Side A.

== Personnel ==
- Barry Gibb – lead vocal, guitar
- Robin Gibb – harmony and backing vocal, guitar
- Maurice Gibb – guitar, bass, backing vocal
- Colin Petersen – drums
- Steve Kipner – backing vocal
