= I Got a Brand New Egg Layin' Machine =

Studio album by Goon Moon
- Released: 2005
- Recorded: Rancho De La Luna, Prescription and Regime Studios
- Genre: Industrial rock
- Length: 25:05
- Label: Suicide Squeeze

Goon Moon chronology
I Got a Brand New Egg Layin' Machine (2005)	Licker's Last Leg (2007)

Professional ratings
Review scores
Source	Rating
Allmusic	3.5/5 stars
Pitchfork Media	(6.3/10)

I Got a Brand New Egg Layin' Machine is the debut mini album of Goon Moon released on Suicide Squeeze Records. According to member Chris Goss the album "... runs the gamut from pure rock to tracks that just sound like noise." The cover art was done by Jesse LeDoux.

== Releases ==
- Suicide Squeeze CD: S 046
- Suicide Squeeze 12":

== Track listing ==
1. "The Wired Wood Shed" - 0:59
2. "Mud Puppies" - 2:00
3. "Inner Child Abuse" - 2:51
4. "The Smoking Man Returns" - 2:26
5. "At The Kit Kat Klub" - 0:39
6. "Rock Weird (Weird Rock)" - 2:34
7. "Mashed" - 2:24
8. "I Got A Brand New Egg Layin' Machine" - 2:59
9. "No Umbrellas" - 3:30
10. "Apartment 31" - 4:43

== Personnel ==
- Produced by Goon Moon (Zach Hill, Jeordie White (as Twiggy Ramirez), Chris Goss).
- Special Guests: Dimitri, David Catching, Whitey, Scooter Pie, Jonesy The Skin Popper, Frater I.A., Peppy Sevenson, Thin Crust.
- Recorded by James Book, Jarred at Regime, Tony Mason.
- Mastered by Ed Brooks at RFI.
- Design by Jesse LeDoux, Jeff Kleinsmith.
