= Twiggy Ramirez =

American rock musician

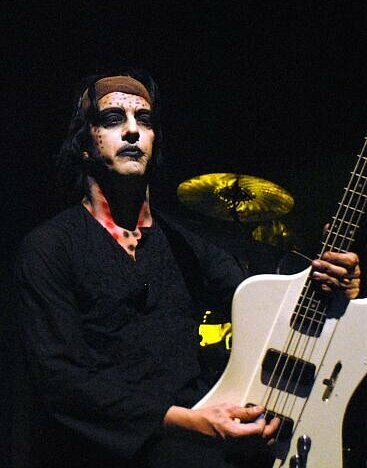
- Ramirez performing in 2008

Background information
- Born: Jeordie Osbourne White; June 20, 1971 (age 55)
- Origin: Fort Lauderdale, Florida, U.S.
- Genres: Alternative metal; industrial metal
- Occupations: Musician, songwriter
- Instruments: Bass, guitar, vocals, keyboards
- Years active: 1989–present
- Member of: Goon Moon
- Formerly of: Marilyn Manson; Nine Inch Nails; A Perfect Circle; Amboog-a-Lard; Satan on Fire; Mrs. Scabtree; The Desert Sessions
- Website: basetendencies.com

Jeordie Osbourne White (born 20 June, 1971), better known as Twiggy Ramirez or simply Twiggy, is an American musician, mostly known as the former bassist and guitarist of the rock band Marilyn Manson. Previously, he was the bassist for A Perfect Circle and a touring member of Nine Inch Nails, and is currently the vocalist for Goon Moon. He left Marilyn Manson in 2002, later rejoined the band in 2008, and was dismissed in 2017. He has been a principal songwriter for the band and has also contributed to some of the Desert Sessions recordings. He also hosted the Hour of Goon podcast with fellow musician Fred Sablan, on the Starburns Audio network.

== Early life ==
White was raised in Pompton Lakes, New Jersey, before moving to Coral Springs, Florida, during his childhood. Influenced by Mötley Crüe, Van Halen and Iron Maiden, he first picked up a guitar at age thirteen. White spent most of his youth in the Fort Lauderdale area, and by age 15, had joined his first band, The Ethiopians. He graduated from J.P. Taravella High School in Coral Springs, Florida.

== Career ==
Early in his career, White was in a speed metal cover band called The Ethiopians covering songs such as Metallica's "Trapped Under Ice". Between 1989 and 1993, White played rhythm guitar and provided backing vocals for Amboog-a-Lard.

=== 1993–2002; 2008–2017: Marilyn Manson ===
White met Marilyn Manson (Brian Warner) on numerous occasions in the late 1980s. After an unexpected meeting at a used records store in the Coral Springs Mall where White was working, the two realized they had much in common, but had yet to work on a musical endeavor. White actively attempted to join Manson's band while playing in another project. In March 1993, White took part in Manson's side project Mrs. Scabtree and shared vocal duties with then girlfriend Jessicka. Jeordie did not join Marilyn Manson and the Spooky Kids until Gidget Gein was ejected from the band by the manager in December 1993. White was given the Manson band member name Twiggy Ramirez, which was derived by taking the first name from English supermodel Twiggy and the surname from American serial killer Richard Ramirez. White never played bass until Manson bought him his first instrument right after he joined the band. In 1998, White made a cameo in Monster Magnet's music video for "Space Lord". In 2001, White appeared on an MTV Cribs episode: the "Ozzfest Edition".

As a result of many lineup changes (specifically guitarists), White was largely responsible for most of the songwriting on the albums Antichrist Superstar, Mechanical Animals and Holy Wood; for the latter album, he shared credits with John 5. In 2007, White said that he is proud of the work that he did in the band.

On January 9, 2008, Marilyn Manson posted a bulletin on MySpace confirming that Tim Skold was leaving Marilyn Manson and that White had rejoined the band in his place. He toured with Manson as the band's bass player in support of their sixth studio album Eat Me, Drink Me. He toured with Manson as the band's new guitarist in support of their seventh studio album. However, he stayed with Goon Moon after the touring of The High End of Low finished.

White said in an interview that he would keep working with Manson for their next album, Born Villain, which was released on May 1, 2012. While he did not participate in the writing or recording of Marilyn Manson's 2015 album, The Pale Emperor, he continued to tour with the band. Manson confirmed on Reddit that he intends on collaborating with White for the follow-up to The Pale Emperor. Despite this, the band's latest album, Heaven Upside Down, features no contributions from White.

On October 24, 2017, Marilyn Manson posted on Facebook that the band parted ways with White following allegations of sexual misconduct made against him, and announced that there would be a replacement for the upcoming tour.

=== 2003–present: Other projects ===
After departing Marilyn Manson, White played two live shows with California punk metal band Mondo Generator, and auditioned for the role of second guitar in Queens of the Stone Age, which he lost to Troy Van Leeuwen of A Perfect Circle. He also auditioned for a spot as bass player (after Jason Newsted's departure) in Metallica, but lost out to former Suicidal Tendencies/Ozzy Osbourne bassist Robert Trujillo, which is documented briefly in their film, Metallica: Some Kind of Monster.

Several months later, White replaced Paz Lenchantin in A Perfect Circle, the project of Tool frontman Maynard James Keenan and former Tool guitar tech Billy Howerdel as a full member of the band on bass guitar. White later joined Queens of the Stone Age frontman Josh Homme on the ninth and tenth volumes of Homme's music project The Desert Sessions. He contributed to Melissa Auf der Maur's solo debut and second solo album Out of Our Minds. He toured with Nine Inch Nails in support of their album With Teeth, from 2005 to 2006 and then again in 2007 for Year Zero.

White has composed for a range of artists from fictional band Steel Dragon to Bif Naked to his namesake, model Twiggy Lawson with whom he recorded and produced a duet of Dusty Springfield's "I Only Want to Be with You" for the soundtrack of the MTV film Dead Man on Campus. In 2005, White worked with Goon Moon and with them released the EP I Got a Brand New Egg Layin' Machine, recorded at Rancho De La Luna, Prescription and Regime Studios. The band released their first full-length album "Licker's Last Leg" in May 2007. White appeared on the UNKLE album War Stories playing bass and synths on the track "Burn My Shadow". ' White was invited to return to play with A Perfect Circle for their Fall and Winter 2010 Tour in North America, but ultimately did not participate in the reunion and was permanently replaced by Matt McJunkins.

== Personal life ==
White cites Oasis, the Who, the Kinks and the Bee Gees as his influences and as his favorite bands. White has a Don't Believe the Truth tattoo as a tribute to Oasis on his left arm. Due to his friendship with Oasis producer Dave Sardy, White got to play bass on a new version of Oasis' "Cast No Shadow" that was submitted to the soundtrack for the 2005 movie Goal!, and contributed remixes of "I'm Outta Time" and "Falling Down" that the band used as b-sides. It has been emphasized by White personally that if there was one single piece of information the public should know about him it would be that he smells like baby powder.

White married model and makeup artist Alaina "Laney Chantal" Parkhurst on July 26, 2014. The couple later separated. Laney Chantal died on October 31, 2022.

On October 21, 2017, White's ex-girlfriend Jessicka Addams, lead singer of the band Jack Off Jill, published a Facebook post accusing White of rape, as well as physical and emotional abuse during their relationship in the 1990s. White issued a statement following the allegations: "I have only recently been made aware of these allegations from over 20 years ago. I do not condone non-consensual sex of any kind. I will be taking some time to spend with my family and focus on maintaining my several years of sobriety. If I have caused anyone pain I apologize and truly regret it."

== Preferred equipment ==
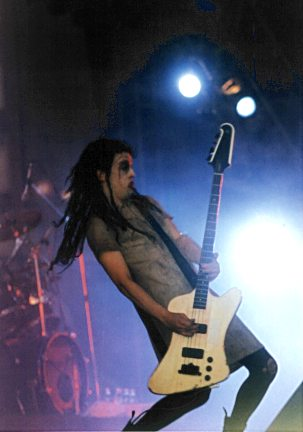
Ramirez performing with Marilyn Manson on the "Dead to the World Tour", 1997

While in Marilyn Manson, White used the following bass guitars, among many things, showing a strong preference for Gibson instruments, and bass guitars used by his classic rock mentors:

- White owns multiple Gibson Thunderbird bass guitars. During the Guns, God, and Government tour, he toured with 5 Thunderbird bass guitars, most often seen with the pickguard removed, or a matching black pickguard on a black Thunderbird. Each bass guitar had different tunings (Standard, Drop D, etc.) and was used for different songs.
- 1992 Gibson Thunderbird IV Reverse (seen in the "Disposable Teens" video; used extensively in live performances from 1998 to 2002, and again for live use since his reunion with Manson in 2008.
- 1974 Gibson Ripper L9-S Bass (vintage, as seen in "The Dope Show" video)
- 1977 Gibson RD Artist Bass (vintage, as seen in the "Dope Hat" and "Coma White" videos). This bass guitar was sold to a fan through a mutual friend of White and Manson in 2005 via eBay.
- BC Rich Warlock Bass w/ Widow headstock (seen in the "Rock is Dead" video).
- 1980s USA BC Rich Warlock bass (4 on a side headstock) Used in live performances from 1998 to 1999, notably during the first live performance of "The Dope Show" on the 1998 MTV Video Music Awards. White donated this bass guitar to the Hard Rock Cafe in Ottawa, Canada, where it is among their most popular pieces of memorabilia on display.
- Gibson Les Paul bass. Used live and in the studio. Makes many appearances in early videos ("Lunchbox", "Get Your Gunn") and saw live use from 1994 to 1997.

During his parting of ways with Manson from 2002 to 2008, he took up the following models as his preferred instruments:

- Fender Precision Deluxe Bass (live, on tour with A Perfect Circle 2003–2004)
- Spector NS-2 Bass (live, on tour with A Perfect Circle 2003–2004)
- Steinberger Spirit Bass (live, on tour with A Perfect Circle 2003–2004)
- Fender Precision Bass (live, on tour with Nine Inch Nails)
- Music Man StingRay 4 Bass (live, on tour with Nine Inch Nails)

In addition to the aforementioned bass guitars, White has used numerous other brands and models of electric and acoustic guitar in writing and recording for each band he has been involved with, and he plays following guitars in live performances.

- Gibson Flying V (With Marilyn Manson)
- Gibson SG (With Goon Moon)
- Gibson ES-335 or Gibson Lucille (With Goon Moon, Nine Inch Nails and Marilyn Manson)
- Gibson Les Paul (With Nine Inch Nails)
- Gibson Explorer (With Marilyn Manson)
- Fender Telecaster (With both Marilyn Manson and Nine Inch Nails)
- Mosrite US65-BK (With Marilyn Manson 2009)
- Eastwood Guitars Sidejack Baritone (With Marilyn Manson 2009) during "We're From America"

== Filmography ==
- 1996: Dead to the World
- 1997: Lost Highway
- 1999: Coma White
- 1999: God Is in the T.V.
- 2002: Guns, God and Government
- 2004: Metallica: Some Kind of Monster
- 2005: Backstage Pass 3: Uncensored!
- 2007: Beside You in Time
- 2009: Night of Pan
- 2012: Slo-Mo-Tion
- 2013: Jeff Hilliard: Good Life
- 2015: Massacre
- 2015: Frankenstein
- 2016: Blood Bath

== Discography ==
Amboog-A-Lard

- 1993: A New Hope

Marilyn Manson

1994: Portrait of an American Family

- 1995: Smells Like Children
- 1996: Antichrist Superstar
- 1998: Mechanical Animals
- 1999: The Last Tour on Earth
- 2000: Holy Wood (In the Shadow of the Valley of Death)
- 2009: The High End of Low
- 2012: Born Villain

Dave Navarro

- 2001: Trust No One (Bass on "Everything")

The Desert Sessions

- 2003: Volumes 9 & 10

A Perfect Circle

- 2003: Thirteenth Step
- 2004: eMOTIVe
- 2004: aMOTION

Nine Inch Nails

- 2007: Beside You in Time

Goon Moon

- 2005: I Got a Brand New Egg Layin' Machine
- 2007: Licker's Last Leg

Soundtrack work

- 1998: Dead Man on Campus Soundtrack ("I Only Want to Be with You" with Twiggy

Marilyn Manson Golden Years)

- 2005: Goal! Soundtrack ("Cast No Shadow (UNKLE Beachhead Mix)" Oasis)
- 2001: Rock Star Soundtrack ("Blood Pollution" for the band Steel Dragon)

UNKLE

- 2007: Burn My Shadow
- 2017: The Road: Part 1
- 2019: The Road: Part II (Lost Highway)

Oasis

- 2008: I'm Outta Time (Remix)
- 2009: Falling Down (It's the Gibb Mix by Twiggy and Sardy)

Cinema Bizarre

- 2009: Lovesongs (Remix)

Sons of Anarchy

- 2013: You Are My Sunshine (Jamey Johnson Shooter Jennings)
