= Licker's Last Leg =

Studio album by Goon Moon
- Released: May 8, 2007
- Genre: Rock
- Label: Ipecac Recordings

Goon Moon chronology
I Got a Brand New Egg Layin' Machine (2005)	Licker's Last Leg (2007)

Professional ratings
Review scores
Source	Rating
Allmusic	4/5 stars
Babysue	5/6 stars
CityBeat	B+
IGN	(8.3/10)
Metal Hammer	7/10 stars

Licker's Last Leg is the first full-length studio album by Goon Moon, and the follow-up to 2005's I Got a Brand New Egg Layin' Machine. The record was released via Ipecac Recordings on May 8, 2007. The album features cameos by longtime Goss collaborator Josh Homme and drummer Josh Freese.

== Track listing ==
Licker's Last Leg
No.	Title	Writer(s)	Producer(s)	Length
1.	"Apple Pie"	Jeordie White; Chris Goss	Edmund Monsef	4:34
2.	"My Machine"	White; Goss; Zach Hill	Edmund Monsef	3:37
3.	"An Autumn That Came Too Soon"	White; Goss	Edmund Monsef	4:06
4.	"Feel Like This"	White; Goss	Edmund Monsef	3:31
5.	"Pin Eyed Boy"	White; Goss; Dave Catching	Edmund Monsef	3:39
6.	"Hardcore Q3"	White; Goss	Edmund Monsef	4:41
7.	"Tip Toe"	White; Goss	Edmund Monsef	3:34
8.	"Every Christian Lion Hearted Man Will Show You"	Barry Gibb; Maurice Gibb; Robin Gibb	Edmund Monsef	4:29
9.	"Lay Down"	White; Goss	Edmund Monsef	4:30
10.	"Balloon?"	White; Goss; Josh Freese	Edmund Monsef	3:33
11.	"The Golden Ball"	White; Goss	Edmund Monsef	9:46
12.	"Built In A Bottle"	White; Goss	Edmund Monsef	4:11
Total length:				54:09
