= New York Mining Disaster 1941 =

Single by the Bee Gees

from the album Bee Gees' 1st
- B-side: "I Can't See Nobody"
- Released: 14 April 1967
- Recorded: 13–16 March 1967
- Studio: IBC (London)
- Genre: Folk rock; pop; baroque pop
- Length: 2:09
- Label: Polydor (United Kingdom, Europe, Japan); Atco (United States, Canada, Mexico); Spin (Australia, New Zealand)
- Songwriters: Barry Gibb; Robin Gibb
- Producers: Robert Stigwood; Ossie Byrne

The Bee Gees singles chronology
"Born a Man" (1967)	"New York Mining Disaster 1941" (1967)	"To Love Somebody" (1967)

Audio sample
- "New York Mining Disaster 1941": file; help

Music video
- "New York Mining Disaster 1941" on YouTube

"New York Mining Disaster 1941" (also titled as "New York Mining Disaster") is the debut international single by the Bee Gees, released on 14 April 1967. It was written by Barry and Robin Gibb. Aside from a moderately successful reissue of their Australian single "Spicks and Specks", it was the first single release of the group's international career and their first song to hit the charts in both the UK and the US. It was produced by Ossie Byrne with their manager Robert Stigwood as executive producer. The song was the first track of side two on the group's international debut album, Bee Gees' 1st. This was the first single with Australian drummer Colin Petersen as an official member of the band.

== Background and writing ==
On 3 January 1967, the Gibb brothers, along with their parents and Byrne, travelled from Australia to England on the ship Fairsky, reaching Southampton on 6 February. The brothers performed on board in exchange for passage. Later, the Gibb brothers auditioned for Stigwood; passed the audition, and signed to Robert Stigwood Organisation on 24 February. "New York Mining Disaster 1941" was their first song to be written in 1967.

The Bee Gees' first recording session after returning to England was "Town of Tuxley Toymaker, Part 1," a song recorded by Billy J. Kramer and the Dakotas, but first recorded by Jon Blanchfield in Australia. Kramer had recorded his version on 4 March 1967 in IBC Studios, London, with the Gibb brothers on background vocals.

Barry and Robin Gibb wrote "New York Mining Disaster" while sitting in a darkened stairway at Polydor Records following a power outage. The song recounts the story of a miner trapped in a cave-in. He is sharing a photo of his wife with a colleague ("Mr. Jones") while they hopelessly wait to be rescued. According to the liner notes for the box set Tales from the Brothers Gibb (1990), the song was inspired by the October 1966 Aberfan disaster in Wales. According to Robin, there actually had been a mining disaster in New York in 1939, but not in 1941, and he thought "New York" sounded more "glamorous".

In the second and third verses, the narrative becomes slower and slower, as if to indicate that life is about to end for the miners. On the second chorus, the drums get louder. On the second verse, when Robin sings the line "I keep straining my ears to hear a sound," a violin is heard in response.

== Recording and composition ==
1967 sheet music cover, Abigail Music, Ltd., London. "Recorded by the Bee Gees on Polydor".

On 7 March, the Bee Gees recorded "New York Mining Disaster 1941" in six takes, along with three other songs: "I Can't See Nobody," "Red Chair, Fade Away," and "Turn of the Century." The orchestra and some other parts were added on 13 March.

The song begins in the chord of A minor; as Maurice explained: "There's a lot of weird sounds on this song like the Jew's harp, the string quartet, and of course the special way that Barry plays that guitar chord. Because of his tuning when he plays the minor at the beginning of the song, which is different from a conventional A minor, it's a nice mixture when I play my conventional tuning together with Barry's tuning because his open D and mine are different." Barry said, "It's Hawaiian tuning, there they play the same way I do. I got a guitar for my ninth birthday and the guy who lived across the road from us just came back from Hawaii and he was the one who taught me that tuning, that's how it started and I never changed."

Maurice Gibb recalled in a June 2001 interview with Mojo magazine: "The opening chord doesn't sound like a conventional A minor. Barry was using the open D tuning he'd been taught when he was nine, and I was playing it in conventional tuning. It gives an unusual blend. People went crazy trying to figure out why they couldn't copy it."

Barry and Robin Gibb took both leading and backing vocals: Robin sang the high harmony while Barry sang the lead (low harmony) both on the first and second verse.

== Release and reception ==
At the time, rumours circulated that the Bee Gees were The Beatles recording under a pseudonym (the Bee Gees' name was alleged to be code for "Beatles Group"), in part because the record referenced NEMS Enterprises (Brian Epstein's management agency, which had just been joined by Bee Gees' manager Robert Stigwood). The song is unusual in that the lyrics do not contain the song's title, though the originally planned title, "Have You Seen My Wife, Mr. Jones," does appear in the chorus.

Atco distributed promos with a blank label and the suggestion that it was an English group whose name started with B. Many DJs thought it was a new Beatles song and played the song heavily. Atco also retitled the song "New York Mining Disaster 1941 (Have You Seen My Wife, Mr. Jones?)" to make sure people could find it in the shops.

Beatles lead guitarist George Harrison met Maurice Gibb at a party several years later, and told him that he had bought a copy of "New York Mining Disaster 1941" because he thought it sounded so much like The Beatles. Maurice's response to Harrison was that the resemblance "was unintentional" and Harrison said, "I knew that, I admire your work." Barry Gibb explained about this song:

"If you sounded like the Beatles and also could write a hit single, then the hype of the machine would go into action, and your company would make sure people thought you sounded like the Beatles or thought you were the Beatles. And that sold you, attracted attention to you. It was good for us because everyone thought it was the Beatles under a different name."

Robin Gibb explained about this track:

"...all the DJs on radio stations in the US picked it up immediately thinking it was the Beatles, and it was a hit on that basis. It established us in those early years. It helped our following record which was nothing like the Beatles."

The success of this song owes a lot more to the perseverance of Robert Stigwood than he has previously been given credit for. "We had quite a hard time at getting the Bee Gees played. We weren't all totally convinced that Stigwood was picking the right song to plug, but at the end of the day, he was a forceful character. All of these guys were... Chas Chandler (manager of Jimi Hendrix) was the same, Kit Lambert (manager of The Who) was the same. They all argued their case with passion, you know, they lived it, they were like that," conceded Polydor's Alan Bates. When the Disc & Music Echo reported "widespread rumours" that this song had been written by Lennon and McCartney, Robin countered with, "Rubbish! We've always written our own songs. I've been writing since I was ten, before Lennon and McCartney were even on stage. People can say what they like. If they don't believe us, they can ask The Beatles."

Bassist Maurice Gibb, though, had previously said that "New York Mining Disaster 1941" was in fact influenced by the Beatles:

"New York Mining Disaster 1941" was a total rip-off of The Beatles, we were so influenced by them. In fact it started a mystery [in the USA] about us, because they started playing [it] and saying, 'They're this new group from England that begins with a B and finished with an s' so they all said, 'Ah, it's The Beatles, not naming it, they're doing that trick again.' The disc jockey would play it and play it and play it and, 'Guess who it is?' and people would guess, and they wouldn't get the answer. I heard [the idea] came actually from Ahmet Ertegun and Jerry Wexler. To us it was an honour, to actually think we were as good as The Beatles."

Billboard described the single as "infectious, compelling material set to a rocking driving beat [that] has all the earmarks of a fast smash." Record World called it a "smash folk-rock debut" for the band.

== Music video and live performances ==
On the video, the band only features four members (but Vince Melouney later joined the band), Barry playing his guitar, Maurice playing his Rickenbacker 4001, Robin Gibb on vocals and drummer Colin Petersen wears a hat.

The group found time to record their first BBC session at Playhouse Theatre, Northumberland Avenue, London, with producer Bill Bebb, on which they performed this song, with the songs "In My Own Time," "One Minute Woman," and "Cucumber Castle." When the BBC Light Programme's Saturday Club presented by Brian Matthew was broadcast on April 22, it was noted that there were "rave reviews from the audition panel."

The group (Barry, Robin, Maurice, Colin and Vince) made their first British TV appearance on Top of the Pops performing this song on May 11 and were rather awe-struck at the company they were keeping. On 20 May 1967, the group performed this song on Beat-Club, a German TV program.

The Bee Gees performed this song on 21 July 1967 at the Stockholm Palladium, Stockholm, Sweden, 12 August 1967 at The Civic Hall, Wolverhampton, England and Christ the King College at Newport, England on 27 September 1967. Since 1967, the song has been part of every Bee Gees concert, eventually becoming part of their acoustic medley performed during the middle of the concert. It was also performed on the show Beat-Club in Germany, on that performance Robin wears a hat and plays violin. It was performed by the group in 1973 on The Midnight Special with Barry and Maurice on rhythm guitar. The song usually began the acoustic medley during The Bee Gees' concerts starting in the mid-70's and continued until their final shows in 2001.

== Personnel ==
- Barry Gibb – lead and backing vocals, rhythm guitar
- Robin Gibb – lead, harmony and backing vocals
- Maurice Gibb – backing vocals, bass guitar, rhythm guitar
- Colin Petersen – drums
- Phil Dennys – orchestral arrangement

The session was engineered by Carlos Olms and produced by Robert Stigwood.

== Charts ==
=== Weekly charts ===
Chart (1967)	Peak position
Australia (Go-Set)	3
Canada Top Singles (RPM)	13
France (SNEP)	36
Germany (Media Control Charts)	10
Netherlands (Dutch Top 40)	3
New Zealand (Recorded Music NZ)	3
Sweden (Tio i Topp)	10
UK Singles (Official Charts Company)	12
US Billboard Hot 100	14
US Cash Box	17
US Record World	14

=== Year-end charts ===
Chart (1967)	Position
Netherlands (Dutch Top 40)	17

== Sales ==
Sales for New York Mining Disaster
Region	Sales
Worldwide	1,000,000

== Legacy ==
The 1969 David Bowie song "Space Oddity" owes a debt to the style, arrangement and lyrics of "New York Mining Disaster 1941." Like "New York Mining Disaster 1941," "Space Oddity" is about a trapped man who is doomed to die, and the song is similarly structured as a series of statements addressed to another person. "'Space Oddity' was a Bee Gees type song," Bowie's colleague John "Hutch" Hutchinson has said. "David knew it, and he said so at the time, the way he sang it, it’s a Bee Gees thing." As Marc Bolan explained: "I remember David playing me 'Space Oddity' in his room and I loved it and he said he needed a sound like the Bee Gees, who were very big then."

Paul McCartney said: "It was the 'Mining Disaster' song that [Robert Stigwood] played me. I said 'sign them, they're great!' And they went on to be even greater."

The Japanese novelist Haruki Murakami made "New York Mining Disaster" the title of one of his short stories. The piece was included in his collection Blind Willow, Sleeping Woman.

In 2000, the rapper Necro sampled "New York Mining Disaster 1941" on the song "Underground" from his album I Need Drugs.

== Cover versions ==
- In July 1967, just one month after the Bee Gees, South African band The Staccatos recorded a cover version of this song for their album on the PYE record label, PY 156 with their song "All the Winds" as a B-side.
- In 1967, the Swedish band The Shanes released a version of the song on their VI LP.
- In 1967 the British group The Motowns recorded a cover version of this song in Italian.
- In 1968, The Index, a garage rock/psychedelic rock band from Grosse Pointe, Michigan active from 1967 to 1969, released a cover on their second self-titled LP, also referred to as the Red Label Album.
- In early 1969, The Sorrows recorded this song as part of a demo album that was prepared before the release of their second album Old Songs New Songs; however, the song remained unreleased until it was included in a two-CD reissue of that album by Wooden Hill in 2009.
- In 1969, Ashton, Gardner and Dyke recorded a version of this song for their self-titled debut album.
- In 1970, the Akron, Ohio-based rock band Wild Butter recorded the song for their only album, Wild Butter, released by United Artists in that same year.
- In 1974, Barclay James Harvest "deconstructed" the song with a reworked version referencing leading figures in the 1974 UK mining strike. The song was retitled "The Great 1974 Mining Disaster".
- In 1993, David Essex recorded a version of this song for his covers album Cover Shot.
- In 1997, the Levellers covered the song as a B-side to their single Bozos.
- In 1998, folksinger Martin Carthy sang an acoustic guitar version of this as the lead-off track on his album Signs of Life.
- In 2000, British anarchist band Chumbawamba recorded a "minimalist" version for their album WYSIWYG.
- In 2006, Mark Newman recorded a version of "New York Mining Disaster, 1941" on his CD Must Be a Pony, which he released on Danal Music.
- In 2008, singer-songwriter Trevor Tanner released a version titled "Mr. Jones" on his album Eaten by the Sea.
- In 2011, Australian bush punk act Handsome Young Strangers covered the song as a B-side to their single "Sweet as a Nut" and then included it on their album Here's The Thunder Lads!
- In 2011 British folk artist Jon Boden (of folk big band Bellowhead) released an unaccompanied version as part of his "A Folk Song a Day" project.
- In 2012, the Catalina Scramblers, a three-piece rock band from Santa Cruz, CA, recorded a version of the song in which they adhere to the original version's style for the verses, but perform the choruses in up-tempo, hard rock fashion. It was released as the final track on their eponymous debut album.
