= Cowman, Milk Your Cow =

Single by Adam Faith
- B-side: "Daddy What'll Happen to Me"
- Released: 22 September 1967
- Recorded: August 1967
- Genre: Psychedelic rock, soft rock
- Label: Parlophone (United Kingdom); Laurie (United States)
- Songwriter(s): Barry Gibb, Robin Gibb

Adam Faith singles chronology
"What More Can Anyone Do?" (1967)	"Cowman, Milk Your Cow" (1967)	"To Hell With Love" (1967)

"Cowman, Milk Your Cow" is a 1967 song by Adam Faith written by the Bee Gees' Barry and Robin Gibb. This song was included on The Two Best Sides of Adam Faith on EMI.

This song was released as the A-side of "Daddy What'll Happen to Me" in the UK, but in the US, this track was the flipside of the same song that was released as a B-side of this song in the UK. The single was released on 22 September and met with a poor reception.

== Origins and recording ==
Faith asked the Gibbs to write a new song after he heard the Bee Gees' third LP Bee Gees' 1st, requesting a psychedelic rock song with intriguing lyrics. The backing band are The Roulettes, according to the notes on The Two Best Sides of Adam Faith, an LP collection on the EMI Records. According to the liner notes on Bee Gees Songbook (CD) the guitar is played by Peter Green of Fleetwood Mac. The backing vocals are the Gibb brothers, and Robin Gibb sings with Faith on the bridge section. The song was recorded in August 1967 inside a little studio in Denmark Street

Faith talk about "Cowman, Milk Your Cow":

I think ['Cowman'] came to me through one of The Roulettes my backing group at the time. They'd heard it and thought it would make a great record. I think we did hear a demo. I loved the song, it was one of those mad moments where you hear somebody, a writer, sing their own song so brilliantly, it fools you into thinking that you can achieve the same effect. Of course, who's going to sing it better than those boys?, Fantastic, amazing group!, Brilliant!.

Barry agreed with Faith's opinion that the Gibbs were a hard act to follow vocally.

== Personnel ==
- Adam Faith — lead vocals
- Barry Gibb — backing vocals
- Robin Gibb — harmony and backing vocals
- Maurice Gibb — backing vocals
- Peter Green — guitar
- Russ Ballard — guitar
- Bob Henrit — drums
- Mod Rogan — bass
