= Every Day I Have to Cry =

Single by Steve Alaimo

from the album Every Day I Have to Cry
- B-side: "Little Girl (Please Take a Chance With Me)"
- Released: December 1962
- Genre: Pop, rhythm and blues, rock and roll
- Length: 2:22
- Label: Checker
- Songwriter: Arthur Alexander

Steve Alaimo singles chronology
"One Good Reason" (1962)	"Every Day I Have to Cry" (1962)	"It's a Long, Long Way to Happiness" (1963)

"Everyday I Have to Cry"

Single by Barry Gibb and the Bee Gees
- B-side: "You Wouldn't Know"
- Released: March 1965
- Recorded: February 1965; Festival Studios, Sydney
- Genre: Pop, rhythm and blues, rock and roll
- Length: 2:05
- Label: Leedon
- Songwriter: Arthur Alexander

Barry Gibb and the Bee Gees singles chronology
"Turn Around, Look at Me" (1964)	"Everyday I Have to Cry" (1965)	"Wine and Women" (1965)

"Every Day I Have to Cry", also known as "Every Day I Have to Cry Some", is a song written by Arthur Alexander and first recorded by Steve Alaimo in 1962. Although the song has been recorded by many musicians over the years, Alexander did not record his own version until 1975. Alaimo's version went to No. 46 on the US Billboard Hot 100 chart (and nO. 45 Cash Box). It became Alaimo's biggest hit as a recording artist.

== Bee Gees version ==
The Bee Gees covered "Every Day I Have to Cry" as teenage recording artists in Australia. This version was recorded at Festival Studios in February 1965 and marked an important first for the group, Maurice Gibb playing organ, which was the first of many times he would contribute keyboards to the group's recordings. The record was backed with "You Wouldn't Know", a Barry Gibb original which was also featured later the same year on the group's first album, The Bee Gees Sing and Play 14 Barry Gibb Songs.

Both songs were included on the 1998 anthology of the group's Australian recordings Brilliant from Birth.

== Other versions ==
Artist	Year	Release	Notes
Steve Alaimo	1962	Please Take a Chance With me 7 inch 45 RPM single. Checker label, 1032	
Steve Alaimo	1963	Every Day I Have to Cry LP, Album, Mono. Checker label, LP-2986	US Billboard #46, US Cashbox #45
Skip and the Flips	1963	released as a single	
Julie Grant	1964	released as a single	
Dusty Springfield	1964 Released 6 March 1964	I Only Want to Be With You, EP	
Claude François	1964	Maman chérie, EP	adapted into French as Chaque jour c'est la même chose
Bobby Vee	1965	Live! On Tour	
Bee Gees	1965	released as a single	Australia only
The Gentrys	1965	released as single	charted in US, but not Top 40
The McCoys	1966	B-side to "You Make Me Feel So Good"	
Ike and Tina Turner	1966 Released September 1966	River Deep Mountain High	produced by Phil Spector
Johnny Rivers	1966	...And I Know You Wanna Dance	South Africa #8
The Valentines	1967	released as single	Australia
Sir Lattimore Brown	1968	released as single	
Bob Luman	1969	released as a single	peaked at #23 on the US Country Charts
BZN	1969	released as single	Netherlands, peaked at #17 on the Dutch Top 40 Charts
Mardi Gras	1971	released as a single	on Hispavox, HS773, in Spain. on Map City, SG 330 and Disc'Az, AZ 10 726, in France.
Arthur Alexander	1975	released as a single	US Billboard #45, US Cashbox #51
Joe Stampley	1977	Saturday Nite Dance	#14 Country
Jerry Lee Lewis	1979	released as a single	
Eddy Mitchell	1979	C'est bien fait	adapted into French as "Tu peux préparer le café noir"
Debby Boone	1980	B-side to "Perfect Fool"	
Graham Parker	1994	Adios Amigo: A Tribute To Arthur Alexander	
C. J. Chenier	1996	Louisiana Blues Nuggets	
Bob Woodruff	1997	Desire Road	
Rick Nelson	1999	The Last Time Around: 1970-1982	
Alan Merrill	2003	Double Shot Rocks	
