= Every Day I Have to Cry (album) =

Studio album by Steve Alaimo
- Released: 1963
- Recorded: Bradley Recording Studios, Nashville, Tennessee
- Genre: Pop
- Label: Checker

Steve Alaimo chronology
Mashed Potatoes (1962)	Every Day I Have to Cry (1963)	Steve Alaimo (1963)

Every Day I Have to Cry is Steve Alaimo's third album for Checker Records. Rather than capitalizing on dance crazes, this album is completely devoted to songs about crying. (The debut albums of Chuck Jackson and Lesley Gore—I Don't Want to Cry! and I'll Cry If I Want To, respectively—are devoted to the same subject.)

The album was arranged by Bill Justis and the cover design was by Howie Richmond. Mort Thomasson and Selby Coffeen were credited for the engineering.

== Track listing ==
=== Side 1 ===
1. "Every Day I Have to Cry" (Arthur Alexander)
2. "I Don't Want to Cry" (Chuck Jackson, Luther Dixon)
3. "My Heart Cries for You" (Carl Sigman, Percy Faith)
4. "I Cried All the Way Home" (Sonny Thompson)
5. "Cry Me a River" (Arthur Hamilton)
6. "I Wake Up Crying" (Burt Bacharach, Hal David)

=== Side 2 ===
1. "Cry" (Churchill Kohlman)
2. "She Cried" (Greg Richards, Ted Daryll)
3. "Don't Cry" (J. Taylor, Steve Alaimo)
4. "Cry of the Wild Goose" (Terry Gilkyson)
5. "Cry Myself to Sleep" (Bob Crewe, Bob Gaudio)
6. "Don't Let the Sun Catch You Crying" (Joe Greene)
