= Every Christian Lion Hearted Man Will Show You =

Single by the Bee Gees

from the album Bee Gees' 1st
- A-side: "Holiday"
- Released: September 1967 (United States); October 1967 (Australia)
- Recorded: 23 March 1967
- Genre: Psychedelia
- Length: 3:38
- Label: Polydor (UK); Atco (US); Spin (Australia)
- Songwriters: Barry Gibb; Robin Gibb; Maurice Gibb
- Producers: Robert Stigwood; Ossie Byrne

Bee Gees flipsides singles chronology
"Close Another Door" (1967)	"Every Christian Lion Hearted Man Will Show You" (1967)	"Barker of the UFO" (1967)

"Every Christian Lion Hearted Man Will Show You" is a song written by Barry, Robin & Maurice Gibb released by the Bee Gees in 1967 on their album Bee Gees' 1st. It was released as the B-side to "Holiday" in the US, Australia and Canada.

The song was revived in concert by Barry Gibb on his 2013–14 Mythology tour.

== Recording ==
This track was recorded on March 23, 1967, along with "Please Read Me", "In My Own Time" and the unreleased track "Life". It was released as the B-side of "Holiday" in Canada and the US in September 1967 and in Australia in October 1967. It also appeared on the 1969 compilation Best of Bee Gees.

Maurice Gibb talks about the Mellotron on this track: "We started off with a Mellotron and we used that on "Every Christian Lion Hearted Man Will Show", I had to repeat that on stage, but I used an organ".

The Bee Gees denied rumours that the Beatles performed on this record.

== Musical structure ==
The introduction of the song features the line Oh solo dominique chanted by Robin four times—this motif also features after each chorus. The verses are sung by Barry whose electric rhythm guitar features prominently. Music critic Bruce Eder describes this track as "close in spirit to the Moody Blues of this era, opening with a Gregorian chant backed by a Mellotron, before breaking into a strangely spaced-out, psychedelic main song body."

== Personnel ==
- Barry Gibb – lead and harmony vocals, rhythm guitar
- Maurice Gibb – bass guitar, Hammond organ, Mellotron
- Robin Gibb – harmony vocals
- Colin Petersen – drums
- Vince Melouney – lead guitar
- Bill Shepherd – orchestral arrangement

== Cover versions ==
- Australian singer Johnny Young released it on his LP Surprises.
- The Flaming Lips recorded this song as an intro to their early live versions of "Shine on Sweet Jesus" as documented on the compilation, 20 Years of Weird: Flaming Lips 1986–2006.
- The Posies recorded the song and it appeared on several bonus/promotional discs in 1996.
- Los Angeles-based band Goon Moon on their second release Licker's Last Leg in 2007.
- Catherine included a version on their album Sorry! in 1994.
