= The Battle of the Blue and the Grey =

Single by Bee Gees
- B-side: "The Three Kisses of Love"
- Released: 22 March 1963
- Recorded: February 1963; Festival Studios, Sydney, Australia
- Genre: Country pop
- Length: 2:05
- Label: Leedon
- Songwriter: Barry Gibb
- Producer: Col Joye

Bee Gees singles chronology
"The Battle of the Blue and the Grey" (1963)	"Timber!" (1963)

"The Battle of the Blue and the Grey" is a debut single by the Bee Gees, backed by "The Three Kisses of Love" and released on March 22, 1963. Like all the Bee Gees' output prior to 1967 (with the notable exception of Spicks and Specks) it was only released in Australia. It was performed in Australian television Bandstand - the footage of that performance still exists. It reached #93 in Australia.

In September 1963, it was included as the third track on their first EP The Bee Gees. Neither song appeared on an album until the mop-up compilation Turn Around, Look at Us in 1967 but both are included on the 1998 compilation Brilliant from Birth which collects all of the Australian material.

== Composition, recording and release ==
It was written by Barry Gibb when he was only 16 years old. Col Joye recalls producing the sessions and using his backing band the Joy Boys, the members were Kevin Jacobsen, John Bogie, Laurie Erwin, Norm Day, Dave Bridge, Bruce Gurr and Ron Patton. As was the norm for the Gibb brothers at the time, Barry sang the vocal solos while Robin and Maurice harmonised around him. It was recorded in February 1963 in Festival Studio, Sydney. Robert Iredale was the engineer in charge.

"The Battle of the Blue and the Grey" was released on 22 March 1963. The song failed to become the hit that their record company had hoped for. In the words of Robin Gibb: "We recorded our first flop based on the story of the American Civil War. Now this record was very hot with one guy 2SM in Sydney. He was playing all this time and, of course, it didn't do anything". The song did reach the top twenty in the local Sydney chart. While the song achieved a reasonable amount of publicity, the music press also made mention of one other member of the household. Tucked away in small print, was news that their sister Lesley Evans had also embarked on a show business career in Surfer's Paradise as a snake-dancer.

The song's length is 2:05 like most of their Australian releases. In an attempt to promote the single, stories appeared in Sydney newspapers about the new 'singing group' and its young songwriter.

== Song lyrics ==
The song is about war. It bore a resemblance to Johnny Horton's 1959 hit "The Battle of New Orleans" albeit somewhat more violent with references to shooting people 'full of lead'. The story was of a retired soldier remembering his fighting experiences including dealings with the real historical figure Stonewall Jackson.

== Personnel ==
- Barry Gibb — lead vocals
- Robin Gibb — harmony and backing vocal
- Maurice Gibb — harmony and backing vocal
- Kevin Jacobsen — bass, piano
- John Bogie — drums
- Laurie Erwin — saxophone
- Norm Day — guitar
- Bruce Gurr — keyboards
- Ron Patton — saxophone
- Robert Iredale — engineer

== Charts ==
Chart	Year	Peak position
Australia (Kent Music Report)	1963	98
