= Follow the Wind =

Song by Barry Gibb and the Bee Gees
- A-side: "Wine and Women"
- Released: September 1965
- Recorded: August 1965
- Genre: Folk rock; psychedelic folk
- Length: 2:07
- Label: Leedon
- Songwriter(s): Barry Gibb
- Producer(s): Bill Shepherd

"Follow the Wind" is a song by Barry Gibb and the Bee Gees. Written by Barry Gibb and produced by Bill Shepherd, it was released as the B-side of "Wine and Women" which charted in Australia. It was later included on The Bee Gees Sing and Play 14 Barry Gibb Songs (1965). It was one of the folk rock songs on the album, the others being "I Don't Think It's Funny", "And the Children Laughing", and "I Was a Lover, a Leader of Men".

== Song development ==
The song is a folk rock ballad and sounded like The Beatles' "I'll Follow the Sun" (1964), "You've Got to Hide Your Love Away" (1965) and "Norwegian Wood (This Bird Has Flown)" (1965). Barry and Robin Gibb sing the lead while Maurice Gibb and Trevor Gordon play lead guitar. It was recorded in August 1965 in Festival Studio at the same time as "Wine and Women", with Robin playing organ and Barry on acoustic guitar. Folk group The Flanagans recorded this song and released it as a single with "Land of Beyond" as the B-side, on His Master's Voice Records. The Flanagans version sounded like The Seekers' Judith Durham.

== Personnel ==
- Barry Gibb – lead vocals, acoustic guitar
- Robin Gibb – lead vocals, organ
- Maurice Gibb – 12-string lead guitar, backing vocals
- Trevor Gordon – lead guitar
- Uncredited – drums
