= To Love Somebody (Bee Gees song) =

1967 single by Bee Gees

Single by the Bee Gees

from the album Bee Gees' 1st
- B-side: "Close Another Door"
- Released: 30 June 1967
- Recorded: April 1967
- Genre: Blue-eyed soul; pop; orchestral pop
- Length: 3:02
- Label: Polydor (United Kingdom); Atco (United States); Spin (Australia)
- Songwriters: Barry Gibb; Robin Gibb
- Producers: Robert Stigwood; Ossie Byrne

The Bee Gees UK singles chronology
| "New York Mining Disaster 1941" (1967) | "To Love Somebody" (1967) | "Massachusetts" (1967) |

The Bee Gees US singles chronology
| "New York Mining Disaster 1941" (1967) | "To Love Somebody" (1967) | "Holiday" (1967) |

Alternative cover
- Japanese cover of "To Love Somebody"

Music video
- "To Love Somebody" on YouTube

"To Love Somebody" is a song written by Barry and Robin Gibb. Produced by Robert Stigwood, it was the second single released by the Bee Gees from their international debut album, Bee Gees 1st, in 1967. The single reached No. 17 in the United States and No. 41 in the United Kingdom. The song's B-side was "Close Another Door". The single was reissued in 1980 on RSO Records with "How Can You Mend a Broken Heart" as its flipside. The song ranked at number 94 on NME magazine's "100 Best Tracks of the Sixties". The entry was a minor hit in France but reached the top 10 in Canada.

In a 2017 interview with Piers Morgan's Life Stories, Barry was asked: "Of all the songs that you've ever written, which song would you choose?" Barry said that "To Love Somebody" was the song that he'd choose as it has "a clear, emotional message". The song has been recorded by many other artists, most prominently by Michael Bolton, Narvel Felts, the Sweet Inspirations, Nina Simone and Jimmy Somerville.

== Origins and lyrics ==
"To Love Somebody"
"To Love Somebody" is a soul ballad recorded by the Bee Gees.

At the request of Robert Stigwood, the band's manager, Barry and Robin Gibb wrote "To Love Somebody", a soulful ballad in the style of Sam & Dave or The Rascals, for Otis Redding. Redding came to see Barry at the Plaza in New York City one night. Robin claimed that "Otis Redding said he loved our material and would Barry write him a song".

The Bee Gees recorded "To Love Somebody" at IBC Studios, London with "Gilbert Green" and "End of My Song" in April 1967 and released it as a single in mid-June. Redding died in a plane crash later that year, before having a chance to record the song.

Robin said, "Everyone told us what a great record they thought it was, Other groups all raved about it but for some reason people in Britain just did not seem to like it." Barry said, "I think the reason it didn't do well here was because it's a soul number, Americans loved it, but it just wasn't right for this country".

Barry Gibb explained in a June 2001 interview with Mojo magazine:

It was for Robert (Stigwood). I say that unabashedly. He asked me to write a song for him, personally. It was written in New York and played to Otis but, personally, it was for Robert. He meant a great deal to me. I don't think it was a homosexual affection but a tremendous admiration for this man's abilities and gifts.

== Release and reception ==
"To Love Somebody" was first released in Britain on 30 June 1967. Billboard described the single as a "smooth, easy beat ballad" that "should put them right back up there at the top of the Hot 100." Record World said that it "is well written; the group, the Gee Bees [sic], sing it well."

== Personnel ==
- Barry Gibb – lead and backing vocals, rhythm guitar
- Robin Gibb – harmony and backing vocals
- Maurice Gibb – backing vocals, bass guitar
- Vince Melouney – lead guitar
- Colin Petersen – drums
- Bill Shepherd – orchestral arrangement

== Charts ==
=== Weekly charts ===
| Chart (1967) | Peak position |
|---|---|
| Australia (Kent Music Report) | 6 |
| Belgium (Ultratop 50 Flanders) | 8 |
| Canada Top Singles (RPM) | 9 |
| France (SNEP) | 65 |
| Netherlands (Dutch Top 40) | 13 |
| South Africa (Springbok) | 10 |
| UK Singles (OCC) | 41 |
| US Billboard Hot 100 | 17 |
| US Cash Box Top 100 | 24 |
| US Record World Singles | 18 |
| West Germany (Media Control Charts) | 19 |

=== Year-end charts ===
| Chart (1967) | Position |
|---|---|
| Netherlands (Dutch Top 40) | 20 |

== Certifications ==
| Region | Certification | Certified units/sales |
|---|---|---|
| New Zealand (RMNZ) | Platinum | 30,000^{‡} |
| United Kingdom (BPI) | Silver | 200,000^{‡} |
^{‡} Sales+streaming figures based on certification alone.

== Jimmy Somerville version ==
"To Love Somebody"

Single by Jimmy Somerville

from the album The Singles Collection 1984/1990
- B-side: "Rain"
- Released: 22 October 1990
- Length: 4:16
- Label: London
- Songwriters: Barry Gibb; Robin Gibb
- Producer: Stephen Hague

Jimmy Somerville singles chronology
| "Read My Lips (Enough Is Enough)" (1990) | "To Love Somebody" (1990) | "Run from Love" (1991) |

In 1990, Jimmy Somerville covered "To Love Somebody" on his greatest hits album The Singles Collection 1984/1990, on which it appears as the fourth track. It was released as a single on 22 October 1990 and became an worldwide hit, peaking inside the top ten in at least seven territories. In the UK, it entered the chart at number 44 on 3 November, reached a peak of number eight three weeks later and charted for 11 weeks. It also reached the top five in the Netherlands, New Zealand, Luxembourg and Austria, was a top-ten hit in Ireland and the Flanders region of Belgium, and a top-20 hit in Italy, France and Germany. On the pan-European Hot 100 Singles chart, it reached number 27 in its third week.

=== Track listings ===
- 7" single
1. "To Love Somebody" – 4:16
2. "Rain (Pascal Gabriel remix) – 6:35
- CD maxi
1. "To Love Somebody" (7" version) – 4:06
2. "Rain" – 6:35
3. "Why?" (remix) – 8:13

=== Charts ===
==== Weekly charts ====
| Chart (1990–1991) | Peak position |
|---|---|
| Australia (ARIA) | 146 |
| Austria (Ö3 Austria Top 40) | 5 |
| Belgium (Ultratop 50 Flanders) | 7 |
| Europe (Eurochart Hot 100) | 27 |
| Europe (European Airplay Top 50) | 3 |
| France (SNEP) | 15 |
| Germany (GfK) | 20 |
| Ireland (IRMA) | 7 |
| Italy (Musica e dischi) | 12 |
| Luxembourg (Radio Luxembourg) | 5 |
| Netherlands (Dutch Top 40) | 6 |
| Netherlands (Single Top 100) | 4 |
| New Zealand (Recorded Music NZ) | 5 |
| UK Singles (Official Charts) | 8 |

==== Year-end charts ====
| Chart (1991) | Peak position |
|---|---|
| Austria (Ö3 Austria Top 40) | 25 |
| Belgium (Ultratop 50 Flanders) | 66 |
| Europe (Eurochart Hot 100 Singles) | 61 |
| Europe (EHR Top 100) | 47 |
| Germany (Media Control) | 38 |
| Italy (Musica e dischi) | 68 |
| Netherlands (Dutch Top 40) | 48 |
| Netherlands (Single Top 100) | 80 |

== Michael Bolton version ==
"To Love Somebody"

Single by Michael Bolton

from the album Timeless: The Classics
- B-side: "Now That I Found You"
- Released: September 1992
- Length: 4:08
- Label: Columbia
- Songwriters: Barry Gibb; Robin Gibb
- Producers: David Foster; Michael Bolton

Michael Bolton singles chronology
| "Steel Bars" (1992) | "To Love Somebody" (1992) | "Drift Away" (1992) |

Music video
- "To Love Somebody" on YouTube

American singer and songwriter Michael Bolton covered and released "To Love Somebody" as a single in September 1992, by Columbia Records, from his 1992 album Timeless: The Classics. His version was produced by him with David Foster, and reached numbers nine and 11 on the US Cash Box Top 100 and Billboard Hot 100 charts. It became his fourth single to peak at number two in Canada, his highest position in that country. It is also his highest-charting single in France, where it reached number seven.

=== Charts ===
==== Weekly charts ====
| Chart (1992–1993) | Peak position |
|---|---|
| Australia (ARIA) | 39 |
| Canada Retail Singles (The Record) | 5 |
| Canada Top Singles (RPM) | 2 |
| Canada Adult Contemporary (RPM) | 1 |
| Europe (Eurochart Hot 100) | 31 |
| France (SNEP) | 7 |
| Germany (GfK) | 61 |
| Ireland (IRMA) | 13 |
| Netherlands (Dutch Top 40) | 36 |
| Netherlands (Single Top 100) | 35 |
| New Zealand (Recorded Music NZ) | 32 |
| UK Singles (Official Charts) | 16 |
| UK Airplay (Music Week) | 18 |
| US Billboard Hot 100 | 11 |
| US Adult Contemporary (Billboard) | 1 |
| US Pop Airplay (Billboard) | 6 |
| US Rhythmic Airplay (Billboard) | 31 |
| US Cash Box Top 100 | 9 |

==== Year-end charts ====
| Chart (1992) | Position |
|---|---|
| Canada Top Singles (RPM) | 55 |
| Canada Adult Contemporary (RPM) | 26 |

| Chart (1993) | Position |
|---|---|
| Canada Adult Contemporary (RPM) | 9 |
| US Billboard Hot 100 | 83 |
| US Adult Contemporary (Billboard) | 33 |
| US Cash Box Top 100 | 49 |

== Other cover versions ==
- 1967: Siluete released a Serbo-Croatian version, entitled "Voleti nekog", on their 1967 EP Kišu sam tražio (I Asked for Rain).
- 1968: Nina Simone covered "To Love Somebody" released on her album To Love Somebody, which reached number 5 in the UK and became her second British hit single after "Ain't Got No, I Got Life". It also reached number 10 in the Dutch Charts, and number 17 in Ireland. Cash Box called her version an "excellent performance."
- 1968: The Sweet Inspirations recorded the song as part of their album What the World Needs Now Is Love. They also recorded it as a single, which reached number 30 on the R&B charts.
- 1969: James Carr released this song as a single and reached number 44 on the R&B Charts.
- 1969: Janis Joplin included a version of the song on her debut solo album, I Got Dem Ol' Kozmic Blues Again Mama!.
- 1969: Lee "Scratch" Perry produced a version of the song for his album The Upsetter, which was recorded in 1969 and released in November of that year. Busty Brown, formerly of The Messengers, provided the lead vocal on the track.
- 1977: Narvel Felts released the song, reaching number 22 on the Hot Country Singles chart.
- 1977 Disco Tex & The Sex-O-Lettes Released their own version of the song on their album, A Piece Of The Rock
- 1979: Hank Williams Jr. covered the song on his album Family Tradition, released on 17 April 1979. It reached number 49 on Billboard's U.S. Hot Country Songs.
- 1989: Billy "Crash" Craddock from Back on Track; peaked at number 91 on the RPM Country Tracks chart in Canada.
- 2005: Billy Corgan covered this song for his first studio album TheFutureEmbrace, stylized as ToLoveSomebody.
- 2013: Michael Bublé covered this song for his eighth studio album To Be Loved, the album's fifth single. It reached number 13 in Poland.
- 2026: Al Green covered this song for his eponymous EP.
