= Timber! (Bee Gees song) =

Single by Bee Gees

from the album The Bee Gees Sing and Play 14 Barry Gibb Songs
- B-side: "Take Hold of That Star"
- Released: July 1963
- Recorded: June 1963
- Studio: Festival Studio, Sydney
- Genre: Pop
- Length: 1:46
- Label: Leedon
- Songwriter(s): Barry Gibb
- Producer(s): Robert Iredale

Bee Gees singles chronology
"The Battle of the Blue and the Grey" (1963)	"Timber!" (1963)	"Peace of Mind" (1964)

"Timber!" is a song recorded by the Bee Gees, written by Barry Gibb. The song was released in Australia as their second single in July 1963, backed with "Take Hold of That Star". It was later included on the group's first album The Bee Gees Sing and Play 14 Barry Gibb Songs.

In September 1963, it was included as the first track on their first EP "The Bee Gees", as well as being included on their compilation album Brilliant of Birth in 1998.

== Recording ==
"Timber!" was recorded in June 1963 in Festival Studio, Sydney. Robert Iredale was the engineer in charge. Barry Gibb was the lead vocalist for this song, with his younger brothers Robin and Maurice Gibb singing the harmony vocals.

== Chart performance ==
In Australia, the song peaked at #75.

== Personnel ==
Partial credits sourced from Joseph Brennan.

- Barry Gibb – lead vocals, rhythm guitar
- Robin Gibb – harmony and backing vocals
- Maurice Gibb – harmony and backing vocals
- Uncredited musicians – double bass, drums, violin, piano
