= Sir Lattimore Brown =

American soul singer (1931 – 2011)

- Also known as: Lattimore Vernon Brown
- Born: LV Brown; August 20, 1931; Mound Bayou, Mississippi, US
- Died: March 25, 2011 (aged 79) Pensacola, Florida, US
- Genres: Southern soul
- Occupation: Singer
- Years active: 1960–2009
- Labels: Zil Records, Excello, Duchess, Sound Stage 7, Renegade Records, 77 Records, Ace Records

Sir Lattimore Brown (August 20, 1931 – March 25, 2011) was an American southern soul singer. A regular on the Chitlin' Circuit from the early 1960s, Brown performed with Fats Domino, Ray Charles, Otis Redding, Etta James, Jackie Wilson and Muddy Waters, but later faded into obscurity with several publications believing he had died in the 1980s. In his obituary, the Daily Telegraph labelled Brown 'soul music's unluckiest man', due to the many personal tragedies he experienced though his life.

== Biography ==
=== Early life ===
LV Brown was born in Mound Bayou, Mississippi, on August 20, 1931. He was raised by his grandfather, a sharecropper, and met neither of his parents. Having sung spirituals from an early age, he formed a vocal group while attending a local church called The Shady Grove Specials. At age 15 age he married and at 17 illegally enlisted in the army giving himself the name Lattimore Vernon Brown while registering. He served for three years in Korea and Vietnam and upon returning found his wife pregnant with another man's child.

=== Career ===
In 1953, Brown moved to Memphis, Tennessee, where he spent time on Beale Street and in the red-light district taking in the city's blues music scene. By 1957, Brown was touring in a minstrel show. Brown's first recordings were for the Zil imprint of the Excello Records label. Two singles were released, "It Hurts Me So" and "Chick Chick Chicky Chick". While neither were especially commercially successful, they received considerable radio play. He later recorded "Somebody's Gonna Miss Me" which achieved moderate success for Excello's own imprint. In 1962, Brown recorded three singles for the Nashville-based Duchess Records label which sold poorly.

Brown moved to Dallas around this time, where he opened a club called the Atmosphere Lounge with silent partner Jack Ruby. Disaster struck the club following Ruby's 1963 shooting of Lee Harvey Oswald.

Influenced by Roscoe Shelton, Brown moved to the Sound Stage 7 label in 1963. He recorded over a dozen songs with the label at the Stax and Muscle Shoals studios recording with Booker T and the MG's and Willie Mitchell. Once again, his records failed to generate significant sales. The recordings from this time were later used to create the album This Is Lattimore's World.

By 1966, Brown was performing using the moniker Sir Lattimore Brown and signed with Otis Redding's RedWal touring agency shortly before Redding died in a plane crash. His most successful single, "Otis is Gone", was a tribute to Redding.

Brown was dropped by Sound Stage 7 in 1970. He subsequently recorded singles with Renegade Records and Seventy Seven Records, before moving for the last time to Ace Records. His final single, "Warm and Tender Love", was released by Ace in 1975.

=== Later life ===
In the 1970s, Brown suffered personal tragedies, with his second wife dying during heart surgery and third wife dying of lung cancer. By the mid-1970s, Brown was trying to keep a low profile after a misunderstanding involving Benny Latimore and the Southern Mafia caused him to fear for his life. In the 1980s Brown retired from music, moved to Little Rock, Arkansas, and opened an after-hours club.

In 1997, Brown moved to Biloxi, Mississippi. Once again, personal tragedy struck in 2005 when Hurricane Katrina flooded Brown's apartment while he was inside. Brown managed to survive by clinging to a makeshift raft. His wife, however, died of a heart attack while evacuating. It took five months for Brown to learn of her death.

After a violent mugging in 2007, the nurse treating Brown learned of his musical history and put him in touch with soul music enthusiasts. This resulted in Brown's first release in three decades, a recording of "Pain in my Heart".

Brown died on March 25, 2011, after being struck by a car in Pensacola, Florida. He was buried in Barrancas National Cemetery.

== Legacy ==
Scottish poet Lachlan Mackinnon wrote a poem called "On Reading an Obituary of Sir Lattimore Brown, Soul Musician" which reflected on the many unfortunate incidents in Brown's life. This poem was published in his 2017 collection Doves.

== Discography ==
=== Compilation albums ===
- 1977: This is Lattimore's World
- 1987: Lattimore Brown
- 1987: Everyday I Have to Cry
- 2006: Little Box of Tricks
- 2009: Nobody Has To Tell Me

=== Singles ===
- 1960: "It Hurts Me So / Got Plenty Troubles" (Zil Records)
- 1960: "Chick Chick, Chicky Chick / Always My Love" (Zil Records)
- 1961: "Somebody's Gonna Miss Me / Darling Dear" (Excello)
- 1961: "Teenie Weenie / Night Time Is The Right Time" (Duchess)
- 1962: "A Mistaken Prayer / Say What" (Duchess)
- 1962: "What Have I Done Wrong / Only I Can Tell The Story " (Duchess)
- 1965: "I'm Not Through Lovin' You" (Sound Stage 7)
- 1966: "I Know I'm Gonna Miss You/Little Bag Of Tricks" (Sound Stage 7)
- 1967: "It's Gonna Take A Little Time / Please, Please, Please" (Sound Stage 7)
- 1967: "Nobody Has To Tell Me / Cruise On Fannie (Cruise On)" (Sound Stage 7)
- 1967: "Shake And Vibrate" (Sound Stage 7)
- 1968: "Everyday I Have To Cry Some / So Says My Heart" (Sound Stage 7)
- 1968: "Otis is Gone (Parts 1 and 2)" (Sound Stage 7)
- 1969: "Yak-A-Poo / I Wish I Felt This Way At Home" (Renegade Records)
- 1970: "Sweet Desiree / I Will" (Renegade Records)
- 1974: "It's Gonna Take A Little More Time" (Seventy Seven Records)
- 1974: "Bless Your Heart / Don't Trust No One" (Seventy Seven Records)
- 1975: "Warm And Tender Love / You Don't Know Like I Know" (Ace Records)
- 2009: "Pain in my Heart" (Rea Thing Records)
