= Holiday (Bee Gees song) =

- German single release of the song

Single by the Bee Gees

from the album Bee Gees' 1st
- B-side: "Every Christian Lion Hearted Man Will Show You" (US and Australia); "Red Chair, Fade Away" (Germany, France and Scandinavia)
- Released: September 1967 (United States); October 1967 (Australia)
- Recorded: 21 April 1967
- Studio: IBC (London)
- Genre: Baroque pop; psychedelia
- Length: 2:52
- Label: Polydor, Philips (United Kingdom, Canada); Atco (United States, Mexico); Spin (Australia, New Zealand)
- Songwriters: Barry Gibb; Robin Gibb
- Producers: Robert Stigwood; Ossie Byrne

Bee Gees US singles chronology
"To Love Somebody" (1967)	"Holiday" (1967)	"Massachusetts" (1967)

Audio sample
- "Holiday": file; help

"Holiday" is a song released by the Bee Gees in the United States in September 1967. It appeared on the album Bee Gees' 1st. The song was not released as a single in their native United Kingdom because Polydor UK released the single "World" from their next album Horizontal.

== Composition and recording ==
The song is composed primarily in a minor key with a strong orchestral presence. Brothers Barry and Robin Gibb, who also wrote the song, share lead vocals. The song was recorded during the same session as "To Love Somebody" around April 1967.

All three Gibb brothers sang the "Dee dees" in the chorus sections of the song.

== Release ==
Billboard described the single as "an intriguing ballad change of pace from their "To Love Somebody" hit," and specifically praised the production. Cash Box praised the "powerful organ backdrop" and "excellent vocal showing." Record World called it "another of the distinctive, inventive Bee Gees mood pieces."

Allmusic critic Stewart Mason praised the song's "haunting and pretty" melody, as well as the Bee Gees' "magical backing harmonies". He described the lyrics as "vaguely poetic and all but impenetrable", giving the lines "It's something I think's worthwhile/If the puppet makes you smile/If not then you're throwing stones, throwing stones, throwing stones" as a specific example.

The song's flipside was "Every Christian Lion Hearted Man Will Show You" in the US, Canada and Australia but "Red Chair, Fade Away" was used in other territories. The song's music video, consisted of footage of the band enjoying traveling a city bus in Paris. Their footage visiting Paris is also used as the music video for "Words". Another promotional film, filmed in black and white, featured the group performing the song.

The song remained a concert favourite for over 30 years, and Maurice Gibb often provided the audience with comedic antics by attempting many failed attempts to join Barry and Robin while singing this song. Evidence of this can be seen in the 1989 "One For All" concert video where Maurice takes a camera from a film cameraman standing nearby and films Barry and Robin as they sing the song.

== Personnel ==
- Barry Gibb – lead and backing vocals
- Robin Gibb – lead and backing vocals, pump organ
- Maurice Gibb – bass guitar, Mellotron, Hammond organ, backing vocals
- Colin Petersen – drums
- Bill Shepherd – orchestral arrangement

== Chart performance ==
=== Weekly charts ===
Chart (1967)	Peak position
Canadian RPM Top Singles	18
France (SNEP)	18
Netherlands (Dutch Top 40)	2
Spain (PROMUSICAE)	10
US Billboard Hot 100	16
US Cash Box	12
US Record World	16

=== Year-end charts ===
Chart (1967–1968)	Position
Netherlands (Dutch Top 40)	20

== Cover versions ==
- In 1968 French-American singer Claudine Longet covered the song on the album Love Is Blue, A&M Records – SP-4142, Side A Track 4.
- In 1968 French singer Michel Didier covered the song in French under the title C'est une folle idée (lyrics: Michel Didier).
- In 1969, The Clique included a cover version on their self-titled album.
- In 1979, Moulin Rouge recorded a late 1970s disco style cover version.
- In 2007, HRSTA recorded a cover on its third album Ghosts Will Come and Kiss Our Eyes.

== Legacy ==
The song was prominently used in the South Korean film Nowhere to Hide (Korean: 인정사정 볼 것 없다; RR: Injeong sajeong bol geot eobtda). It later featured in the South Korean television series Reply 1997, and South Korean girl group Red Velvet's Level Up Project, as a contrast to the song of the same name by SM Entertainment labelmate, Girl's Generation.

One of the robots sang the song in the "Mitchell" episode of the American television comedy series Mystery Science Theater 3000.
