= You Wouldn't Know (Bee Gees song) =

Song by Barry Gibb and the Bee Gees
- A-side: "Everyday I Have to Cry"
- Released: March 1965
- Recorded: February 1965
- Genre: Merseybeat; R&B
- Length: 2:06
- Label: Leedon
- Songwriter: Barry Gibb

"You Wouldn't Know" is a song written by Barry Gibb which was recorded by the Bee Gees and released as the B-side of their version of "Everyday I Have to Cry" and later included on the album The Bee Gees Sing and Play 14 Barry Gibb Songs (1965). The album of the same name was released in Europe by Tring Records and features the Bee Gees songs from 1963 to 1966.

== Recording and structure ==
It was recorded in February 1965 around the same time as "Everyday I Have to Cry". The version of this song on Brilliant from Birth (1998) is faded 7 seconds early at 1:59 and Robin Gibb can be heard shouting and laughing on the fadeout. It was the first song on which Maurice Gibb is credited playing organ.

The song starts with a guitar strumming, the riff and an organ and then Barry starts to sing the line "Come a bit close to me, let me be kissed, Come on and give to me what I have missed, I love you woman, I know that I'll get you somehow". Robin and Maurice then sing harmony on the chorus: "You wouldn't know if I hadn't told you so, You wouldn't know if I hadn't told you so, oh".

== Personnel ==
- Barry Gibb – lead vocal, guitar
- Robin Gibb – harmony and backing vocal
- Maurice Gibb – harmony and backing vocal, organ, guitar
- Uncredited – drums, bass guitar
