= All by Myself (Bee Gees song) =

Song by Bee Gees

from the album Inception/Nostalgia
- Released: 1970
- Recorded: July 1966
- Length: 2:38
- Label: Karussell (Germany); Triumph (France)
- Songwriter: Maurice Gibb
- Producer: Nat Kipner

"All by Myself" is a song recorded by the English rock group Bee Gees in 1966 and was not released until 1970 when it was included on Inception/Nostalgia. It was written by Maurice Gibb, who also sings lead vocals on this track. According to Allmusic's Steve Leggett, the song was influenced by Beatles along with three other songs by the Bee Gees, "How Many Birds", "Exit, Stage Right" and "Coalman".

== Origin and lyrics ==
It was the first song written and credited to Maurice Gibb alone, and was also his first solo lead vocal on a Bee Gees record. The song features a hard distorted electric guitar. The horns were played by Geoff Grant. The track was recorded around June to July 1966 in Saint Clair Studios in Hurstville.

== Personnel ==
- Maurice Gibb — lead vocal, lead guitar, bass guitar
- Colin Petersen — drums
- Russell Barnsley — drums
- Geoff Grant — trumpet

== Cover versions ==
- Australian rock band The Brigade release it in 1968 on Astor Records, backed by "Joan". Maurice Gibb's name was mistakenly spelled 'Maurice Dibb' on the label. It is their debut single and was produced by Ron Tudor, The Moods also supported the Rolling Stones on their first tour.
