= The Bee Gees Sing and Play 14 Barry Gibb Songs =

Studio album by Barry Gibb and the Bee Gees
- Released: November 1965
- Recorded: June 1963 – October 1965
- Studios: Festival Studio, Sydney
- Genres: Pop; rock and roll
- Length: 34:37
- Label: Leedon
- Producers: Bill Shepherd; Robert Iredale (other songs)

Barry Gibb and the Bee Gees chronology
The Bee Gees Sing and Play 14 Barry Gibb Songs (1965)	Spicks and Specks (1966)

Singles from The Bee Gees Sing and Play 14 Barry Gibb Songs
- 1. "I Was a Lover, a Leader of Men" Released: November 1965

The Bee Gees Sing and Play 14 Barry Gibb Songs is the debut studio album by the Bee Gees. Credited to Barry Gibb & The Bee Gees, it was released in November 1965 on the Australian Leedon label (1967's Bee Gees' 1st was their third album, but their first international album). It is largely a compilation of most of the Gibb brothers' singles that had been released over the previous two years in Australia, which accounts for the many different styles of music on it.

== Recording ==
Only five new songs were recorded for the album: "I Was a Lover, a Leader of Men", "And the Children Laughing", "I Don't Think It's Funny", "How Love Was True" and "To Be or Not to Be". Barry Gibb had more than enough unrecorded songs for an all-new LP, but the rest of the album was instead made up of nine lesser-known singles. Bee Gees musical arranger Bill Shepherd set the order of the songs.

=== Instrumental division ===
Barry Gibb plays rhythm guitar.

Robin Gibb often plays instruments, such as Hammond organ and melodica.

Maurice Gibb plays lead guitar on "I Was a Lover, a Leader of Men" and "How Love Was True", probably as well as "I Don't Think It's Funny".

The fast piano on "To Be or Not to Be" is perhaps credited to Maurice Gibb. The Hammond organ on "I Was a Lover, a Leader of Men" and "And the Children Laughing" is by either Robin Gibb or Maurice Gibb. Though uncredited on the back of this album, it is confirmed that the Gibbs' friend Trevor Gordon played lead guitar on "Peace of Mind", "Wine and Women" and "Follow the Wind". Gordon had released the single House Without Windows /And I'll Be Happy backed by The Bee Gees early in 1965, whilst The Gibb brothers had written both sides of his follow-up single. He later went on to find success with Graham Bonnet in the UK-based duo the Marbles, who had a hit with "Only One Woman" written by the Bee Gees and produced by Barry Gibb and Maurice Gibb with Robert Stigwood.

== Releases ==
The original issue of the LP on Leedon is extremely rare; even the 1967 reissue on the Australian budget Calendar label is rarely seen. The album was not issued outside of Australia until it was issued on CD in 2013, when it was released as part of a box set, Festival Album Collection: 1965–1967.

The "Bee Gees" is spelled with an apostrophe on the front cover, but not on the rear sleeve or labels – and unlike on any of their single releases.

Other than its successor Spicks and Specks, this is their only album cover where the group is stylized as "The Bee Gees" rather than most their releases where they're identified simply as "Bee Gees"

Earlier tracks, like "Peace of Mind", "Claustrophobia" and "Could It Be", are in the beat vein that was popular throughout 1964, while later singles like "Follow the Wind" and "And the Children Laughing" reflect the more folky sounds of 1965. Of the new tracks that were recorded specifically for the album, "To Be or Not to Be" was probably the biggest departure, being a blues-based hard rocker. On the 1998 Australia-only 2-CD compilation Brilliant From Birth, "You Wouldn't Know" is faded early to 2:03, losing the shouting and laughing in the longer original fade.

The Bee Gees' albums and singles that were released before the band relocated to England in late 1966 have never been issued outside Australia, although various songs from this period (1963-66) were used on various albums and non-album singles in other countries. "I Was a Lover, a Leader of Men," "Follow the Wind," "Claustrophobia," "Take Hold of That Star," "Could It Be," and "To Be Or Not To Be" were released (along with other songs not included on this album) in the UK on the compilation Rare, Precious, and Beautiful: Volume 2 by Polydor Records in November 1968 and in the US by Atco Records in February 1970.

== Track listing ==
All tracks are written by Barry Gibb.

Side one
No.	Title	Lead vocals	Length
1.	"I Was a Lover, a Leader of Men"	Barry Gibb	3:35
2.	"I Don't Think It's Funny"	Robin Gibb	2:52
3.	"How Love Was True"	Robin	2:12
4.	"To Be or Not to Be"	Barry and Robin	2:10
5.	"Timber!"	Barry	1:46
6.	"Claustrophobia"	Barry	2:14
7.	"Could It Be"	Barry	2:03

Side two
No.	Title	Lead vocals	Length
1.	"And the Children Laughing"	Barry	3:20
2.	"Wine and Women"	Barry and Robin	2:52
3.	"Don't Say Goodbye"	Barry	2:23
4.	"Peace of Mind"	Barry	2:20
5.	"Take Hold of That Star"	Barry	2:38
6.	"You Wouldn't Know"	Barry and Robin	2:05
7.	"Follow the Wind"	Barry and Robin	2:07

== Personnel ==
Partial credits sourced from Joseph Brennan.

Bee Gees

- Barry Gibb – lead vocals, harmony and backing vocals, rhythm guitar
- Robin Gibb – lead vocals, harmony and backing vocals; Hammond organ on "Wine and Women" (uncertain) and "Follow the Wind" (uncertain); melodica on "Claustrophobia" and "Could It Be"
- Maurice Gibb – harmony and backing vocals; lead guitar on "Wine and Women" (uncertain) and "Follow the Wind" (uncertain); Hammond organ and rhythm guitar on "You Wouldn't Know"; rhythm guitar on "Claustrophobia" and "Could It Be"

Additional musicians and production

- Bruce Davis, Leith Ryan – lead guitar on "Claustrophobia" and "Could It Be"
- Bill Swindells – bass guitar on "Claustrophobia" and "Could It Be"
- Laurie Wardman – drums on Claustrophobia" and "Could It Be"
- Uncredited musicians – bass guitar (except "Claustrophobia," "Could It Be", "Timber!," and "Take Hold of That Star"); drums (except "Claustrophobia" and "Could It Be"); lead guitar and piano on "Don't Say Goodbye" and "Peace of Mind"; double bass, violin and piano on "Timber!" and "Take Hold of That Star"
- uncertain (either Robin Gibb or Maurice Gibb) – Hammond organ on "I Was A Lover, A Leader of Men" and "And the Children Laughing"
- unknown (possibly Maurice Gibb) – piano on "To Be Or Not To Be"; acoustic lead guitar on "I Don't Think It's Funny"
