= Wine and Women =

Single by Barry Gibb and the Bee Gees

from the album The Bee Gees Sing and Play 14 Barry Gibb Songs
- B-side: "Follow the Wind"
- Released: September 1965 (Australia)
- Recorded: August 1965; Festival Studio, Sydney
- Genre: Rock; beat
- Length: 2:52
- Label: Leedon
- Songwriter: Barry Gibb
- Producer: Bill Shepherd

Barry Gibb and the Bee Gees singles chronology
"Every Day I Have to Cry" (1965)	"Wine and Women" (1965)	"I Was a Lover, a Leader of Men" (1965)

"Wine and Women" is a song written by Barry Gibb, and released by Barry Gibb and the Bee Gees in September 1965 on Leedon Records in Australia. The song's B-side was Follow the Wind. The single reached #47 in Australia. They achieved this by getting as many of their fans as possible to buy the record, thus, to the attention of disc-jockeys.

Both songs were later included on the group's debut album The Bee Gees Sing and Play 14 Barry Gibb Songs, as well as the 1998 anthology of the group's Australian recordings Brilliant from Birth.

Wine and Women marked the first time Barry and Robin had traded lead vocals. Maurice plays the brief, lead guitar break, Barry's guitar strumming is mixed forward and he sings most of the lead vocals on this song. "Follow the Wind", despite being written by Barry, was sung by Robin.

Another important debut was that of Bill Shepherd in the producer's chair. Shepherd would travel with the group to England when they launched their international career and for many years arranged and conducted their orchestral backing on record and in concert.

== Personnel ==
- Barry Gibb – lead vocals, rhythm guitar
- Robin Gibb – lead vocals
- Maurice Gibb – backing vocals, 12-string lead guitar
- Uncredited musician – drums
