= Peace of Mind (Bee Gees song) =

Single by Bee Gees

from the album The Bee Gees Sing and Play 14 Barry Gibb Songs
- B-side: "Don't Say Goodbye"
- Released: March 1964
- Recorded: February 1964; Festival Studio, Sydney
- Genre: Merseybeat
- Length: 2:20
- Label: Leedon
- Songwriter: Barry Gibb

Bee Gees singles chronology
"Timber!" (1963)	"Peace of Mind" (1964)	"Claustrophobia" (1964)

"Peace of Mind" is a song by the Bee Gees, released in Australia in March 1964 as their third single, backed with "Don't Say Goodbye".

== Recording and lyrics ==
It was later included on the group's first album The Bee Gees Sing and Play 14 Barry Gibb Songs. It was recorded in February 1964 at Festival Studio in Sydney. It was also included on the 1998 compilation Brilliant from Birth. Although no production credit is given, Robert Iredale, who had produced the previous single, was credited as engineer.

Barry is singing lead vocals, with Robin and Maurice Gibb singing harmony vocals.

== Personnel ==
- Barry Gibb — lead vocals, rhythm guitar
- Robin Gibb — harmony and backing vocals
- Maurice Gibb — harmony and backing vocals
- Trevor Gordon — lead guitar
- Uncredited musicians — bass, drums, piano
