= Rare, Precious and Beautiful =

Compilation album by the Bee Gees
- Released: 1968
- Recorded: April–May, June–July 1966; Sydney, Australia
- Genres: Beat, pop
- Labels: Polydor; Atco (USA); Karussell, Forum (Germany)
- Producer: Nat Kipner

The Bee Gees chronology
Turn Around, Look at Us (1967)	Rare, Precious and Beautiful (1968)	Rare, Precious and Beautiful, Volume 2 (1968)

Rare, Precious and Beautiful is a compilation album released by the Bee Gees in 1967 on Polydor Records; in Germany, the compilation was released on Karussell and Forum Records. All of the songs on this album were originally released on the group's 1966 album Spicks and Specks. It was also issued in 1968 by Atco Records as catalogue number SD 33-264 in electronically rechanneled simulated stereo.

The release was followed by a Volume 2 and Volume 3.

== Track listing ==
All tracks are written by Barry Gibb except where noted.

Side one
No.	Title	Writer(s)	Lead vocal(s)	Length
1.	"Where Are You"	Maurice Gibb	Maurice	2:10
2.	"Spicks and Specks"		Barry	2:52
3.	"Playdown"		Barry, Robin, Maurice	2:54
4.	"Big Chance"		Robin, Barry	1:40
5.	"Glass House"	Barry Gibb, Robin Gibb	Robin	2:25
6.	"How Many Birds"		Barry	1:57

Side two
No.	Title	Writer(s)	Lead vocal(s)	Length
1.	"Second Hand People"		Barry, Robin, Maurice	2:10
2.	"I Don't Know Why I Bother With Myself"	Robin Gibb	Robin	2:43
3.	"Monday's Rain"		Robin, Barry	2:58
4.	"Tint of Blue"	Barry Gibb, Robin Gibb	Barry, Robin	2:05
5.	"Jingle Jangle"		Robin	2:10
6.	"Born a Man"		Barry	3:10
