= The Three Kisses of Love =

Single by Bee Gees
- A-side: "The Battle of the Blue and the Grey"
- Released: 22 March 1963
- Recorded: February 1963
- Studio: Festival, Sydney, Australia
- Genre: Pop; R&B; swamp pop; rock
- Length: 1:46
- Label: Leedon
- Songwriter(s): Barry Gibb
- Producer(s): Col Joye

Bee Gees flipsides singles chronology
"The Three Kisses of Love" (1963)	"Take Hold of That Star" (1963)

"The Three Kisses of Love" is a song composed principally by Barry Gibb and recorded by the Bee Gees. It was released on 22 March 1963 as the B-side of their debut single "The Battle of the Blue and the Grey". It was later included in numerous compilations.

The song was performed in lip-sync on Bandstand along with "The Battle of the Blue and the Grey" on 24 April 1963.

== Recording ==
It was recorded around February 1963 along with the song's A-side "The Battle of the Blue and the Grey". Recording took place at Sydney's Festival Studios. This song was later compared to Herman's Hermits' "Silhouettes". It was also compared to the group's earlier song, "Let Me Love You" also a Barry Gibb composition written in 1959. Both tracks featured orchestral backing, but since the arrangements consist only of violin, string bass and drums with the violin (or possibly damped guitar) played pizzicato it is likely that Robert Iredale or Col Joye had made use of an echo chamber. This was Iredale's favorite trick which was probably featured on some of the Bee Gees' next few singles too. By placing a microphone and speaker in a small room adjacent to the recording booth, Iredale could make a solitary violin sound like a more string section.

== Personnel ==
- Barry Gibb — lead vocals
- Robin Gibb — backing and harmony vocals
- Maurice Gibb — backing and harmony vocals
- Joy Boys – guitar, bass, drums

Engineered by Robert Iredale
Produced by Col Joye
