= Inception/Nostalgia =

Compilation album by Bee Gees
- Released: 1970
- Recorded: 1966
- Length: 62:53
- Label: Karussell (Germany); Triumph (France)
- Producer: Nat Kipner

Inception/Nostalgia is a 1970 compilation album of previously unreleased songs recorded by the Bee Gees in 1966. This double album contains a mixture of both self-penned songs and covers. The first LP in the set is titled Inception while the second LP is titled Nostalgia, hence the album title. Supposedly intended as a follow-up to the three volumes of Rare, Precious and Beautiful this set was first issued by Karussell in Germany and by Triumph in France, both being Polydor budget labels and therefore linked to their licensing deal with Festival Records. The Gibb brothers were unaware of its release until Maurice saw one during a skiing holiday in Switzerland. It did not remain in print for long but it was released by Polydor in Japan in 1972 as Inception and Nostalgia and a number of single disc releases with a varying selection of these songs appeared on a number of compilations across the world over the next few years.

== Background ==
The original songs, those written by one or more Gibb brother, were all written and recorded during or shortly after the recording of what made up the Spicks and Specks album at Ossie Byrne's recording studio in Hurstville. Those twelve songs could have made up the contents of a subsequent Bee Gees album, but were ultimately turned over as demos for other artists to record, among them Ronnie Burns who promptly used eight of their songs for his 1967 album "Ronnie", including "All the King's Horses" of which the Bee Gees version remains unreleased. "Lonely Winter" was part of a deal with the band Steve & the Board to each record a song written by a member of the other band, Barry Gibb in turn supplied them with "Little Miss Rhythm & Blues". The brothers also took time to record a number of covers of songs by The Beatles as well as the Lovin' Spoonful, but for what purpose is unknown. Two additional songs from this batch, the Walker Brothers' "Another Tear Falls" and The Beatles' "If I Needed Someone", still remain unreleased. At some point during their recording sessions the brothers found some orchestral backing tracks to which they added lead vocals with no intention of releasing them.

== Track listing ==
All tracks are written by Barry Gibb, Robin Gibb and Maurice Gibb except where noted.

Side one – Inception
No.	Title	Writer(s)	Lead vocal(s)	Length
1.	"In the Morning"	Barry Gibb	Barry	2:52
2.	"Like Nobody Else"	Barry Gibb	Robin, Barry	2:33
3.	"Daydream"	John Sebastian	Barry	2:18
4.	"Lonely Winter"	Carl Keats (aka Carl Groszmann)	Maurice	2:28
5.	"You're the Reason I'm Living"	Bobby Darin	Barry	2:18
6.	"Coalman"	Barry Gibb (or Barry Gibb, Robin Gibb, Maurice Gibb)	Barry, Robin	2:51

Side two
No.	Title	Writer(s)	Lead vocal(s)	Length
1.	"Butterfly"		Barry	3:13
2.	"Storm"		Robin	2:28
3.	"Lum-De-Loo"	Robin Gibb	Robin	2:02
4.	"You're Nobody till Somebody Loves You"	James Cavanaugh, Russ Morgan, Larry Stock	Barry	1:52
5.	"You Won't See Me"	John Lennon, Paul McCartney	Robin	3:10
6.	"The End"	Jim Krondes, Sid Jacobson	Barry	2:59

Side three – Nostalgia
No.	Title	Writer(s)	Lead vocal(s)	Length
1.	"I'll Know What to Do"		Barry, Robin	2:18
2.	"All by Myself"	Maurice Gibb	Maurice	2:38
3.	"Ticket to Ride"	John Lennon, Paul McCartney	Barry, Robin	3:10
4.	"I Love You Because"	Leon Payne	Barry	2:28
5.	"Paperback Writer"	John Lennon, Paul McCartney	Barry	3:05
6.	"Somewhere"	Leonard Bernstein, Stephen Sondheim	Robin	3:01

Side four
No.	Title	Writer(s)	Lead vocal(s)	Length
1.	"The Twelfth of Never"	Jerry Livingston, Paul Francis Webster	Barry	2:40
2.	"Forever"		Barry	2:43
3.	"Top Hat"	Barry Gibb	Robin	2:14
4.	"Hallelujah I Love Her So"	Ray Charles	Barry	2:11
5.	"Terrible Way to Treat Your Baby"		Robin, Barry	2:51
6.	"Exit, Stage Right"	Barry Gibb (or Barry Gibb, Robin Gibb, Maurice Gibb)	Barry	2:30

== CD release ==
Although no official reissue of this album has been made available on CD ten of the tracks were included on Birth of Brilliance issued by Festival Records in 1994, itself being a reissue of the 1978 double LP on the Infinity label. It was superseded in 1998 by another Festival compilation with the confusingly similar title of Brilliant from Birth which included 63 of their Australian recordings, including all of the songs from Inception/Nostalgia. The song writing credits on the Brilliant from Birth set has some inaccuracies as does the liner notes.
