= I Want Home =

Single by the Bee Gees
- B-side: "Cherry Red"
- Released: March 1966 (Australia)
- Recorded: February 1966; Festival Studio, Sydney
- Genre: Garage rock
- Length: 2:24
- Label: Leedon
- Songwriter: Barry Gibb
- Producer: Joe Halford

The Bee Gees singles chronology
"I Was a Lover, a Leader of Men" (1965)	"I Want Home" (1966)	"Monday's Rain" (1966)

"I Want Home" is a song by the Bee Gees, written by Barry Gibb and released as a single in Australia in early 1966, backed with "Cherry Red". Their last single on Leedon had not been a hit, so the credit "Barry Gibb and the Bee Gees" used on the last several discs now reverted to simply "Bee Gees". Neither song appeared on any Bee Gees album until the 1967 compilation album, Turn Around, Look At Us, but both were featured on Brilliant From Birth the 1998 anthology of the group's Australian recordings.

With these two songs the Bee Gees inaugurated Festival's new four-track recording equipment. If the multitrack tapes still existed, stereo mixes would have been possible but only the mono mixdowns survived. Promotional material for this single asks radio to play both sides, but "I Want Home" is listed first as it has the lower number matrix number, usually indicating the A-side, The lead guitar is played by Maurice. Colin Petersen thought he played drums on both songs.

== Personnel ==
- Barry Gibb — lead vocals, guitar
- Robin Gibb — harmony and backing vocals
- Maurice Gibb — backing vocals, lead guitar
- Colin Petersen — drums
- Uncredited musicians — bass, guitar
