= Bee Gees' 1st =

Studio album by the Bee Gees
- Released: 14 July 1967
- Recorded: 7 March – 21 April 1967
- Studio: IBC (London)
- Genres: Psychedelic rock, psychedelic pop, art pop, baroque pop
- Length: 37:39
- Labels: Polydor, Atco
- Producers: Robert Stigwood, Ossie Byrne

The Bee Gees chronology
Spicks and Specks (1966)	Bee Gees' 1st (1967)	Horizontal (1968)

Singles from Bee Gees' 1st
- 1. "New York Mining Disaster 1941" Released: April 1967; 2. "To Love Somebody" Released: June 28, 1967; 3. "Holiday" Released: September 1967

Bee Gees' 1st is the third studio album by the Bee Gees, and their first international full-length recording after two albums distributed only in Australia and New Zealand. Bee Gees' 1st was the group's debut album for the UK Polydor label, and for the US Atco label. Bee Gees 1st was released on 14 July 1967 in the UK and on 9 August 1967 in the US. On 9 August it entered the UK charts; on that same day, the album was released in the US, and it entered the US charts on 26 August.

Reflecting the group's early style, Bee Gees' 1st was a psychedelic rock and psychedelic pop album. The album cover was designed by Klaus Voormann, who had previously done the cover for Revolver by the Beatles, amongst others. Bee Gees 1st peaked at No. 7 on Billboard's Pop Albums chart and at No. 8 on the UK Albums Chart. In 2006, Reprise Records (sister label to Atco under Warner Music Group) reissued the album with both stereo and mono mixes on one disc and a bonus disc of unreleased songs and alternate takes. (This 2-CD set on Reprise corrected the fluttering on the lead-off stereo track "Turn of the Century". The mono version never had this problem.)

== History ==
Drummer Colin Petersen and lead guitarist Vince Melouney, both Australians, were hired to make the Bee Gees into a full band. Both played on the first English recorded album and became official members of the group between its completion and release. Petersen had played with the Bee Gees at St. Clair studio in 1966 on the Spicks and Specks sessions and was officially added first, accounting for some early photos with him and not Melouney, such as the one later used on the cover of Best of Bee Gees. Melouney had worked with the Gibbs in 1966 in Australia when he recorded his first solo single "Mystery Train" as the brothers provided backing vocals on the song. He had been lead guitarist in a top Australian band, Billy Thorpe & the Aztecs, later led his own group The Vince Melouney Sect and had most recently been in Melbourne-based outfit The Blue Jays. Melouney, who had recently relocated to London heard that the Gibb brothers were in town and made contact. He was asked to join them, with Petersen, in the studio and after this album was completed, Melouney became the fifth official member of the band.

Most of the band's recording for the next five years took place at IBC Studios. IBC had a four-track recording facility, the standard in Britain at the time. The Bee Gees also recorded at various other studios during this first year in England.

== Recording ==
Recording sessions began on 7 March, not long after the Gibb Brothers' return to England, with overdubbing a week later. Orchestral parts were then added to many of the songs. Most were arranged by Bill Shepherd (who for the next six years would act as the Bee Gees' arranger and conductor in the studio and on tour); four were done by Phil Dennys.

Barry Gibb commented about the recording process: "We drive the producer and technicians mad. We have nothing knocked out. We sit about and think up a subject, then write a song on the spot. We did the whole of the LP like this. It's really the only way we can work, spontaneously off the cuff."

== Aftermath ==
By the end of 1967, the album had been a top ten hit in the United States, United Kingdom and Germany. Byrne never worked on another Bee Gees recording as IBC Studios engineer Damon Lyon Shaw explained:

I did more stuff with Ossie Byrne without the Bee Gees than I did with the Bee Gees. Ossie had a knack of keeping quiet and letting people get on, and then he went adrift a bit and got some bands that weren't quite so good. I had a lot of time for Ossie, he was a nice chap ... he didn't have much talent as a producer I have to say, but he had enough talent to see the band. He had this talent of keeping people together and making them productive.

Shaw's colleague John Pantry agreed with Shaw's assessment:

Ossie was a nice guy. He didn't know a great deal technically and initially relied heavily on the engineers. It wasn't long before the Bee Gees knew as much as him and started doing sessions without him ...

After singer Adam Faith heard the songs, he asked the Gibbs to write a song for him. The brothers came out with "Cowman, Milk Your Cow".

== Reception ==
Professional ratings
Review scores
Source	Rating
AllMusic	4/5 stars
Encyclopedia of Popular Music	5/5 stars
The Rolling Stone Album Guide	2.5/5 stars

According to music critic Bruce Eder of AllMusic:

In one fell swoop, they became competitors with the likes of veteran rock bands such as the Hollies and the Tremeloes, and this long-player, Bee Gees' 1st, is more of a rock album than the group usually got credit for generating. Parts of it do sound very much like the Beatles circa Revolver, but there was far more to their sound than that. The three hits off of Bee Gees' 1st, "To Love Somebody" "New York Mining Disaster 1941" and "Holiday" were gorgeous but relatively somber, thus giving Bee Gees' 1st a melancholy cast, but much of the rest is relatively upbeat psychedelic pop." In My Own Time" may echo elements of the Beatles' "Doctor Robert" and "Taxman" but it's difficult to dislike a song with such delicious rhythm guitars and a great beat, coupled with the trio's soaring harmonies; "Every Christian Lion Hearted Man Will Show You" was close in spirit to the Moody Blues of this era, opening with a Gregorian chant backed by a Mellotron, before breaking into a strangely spaced-out, psychedelic main song body. Robin Gibb's lead vocals veered toward the melodramatic and poignant, and the orchestra did dress up some of the songs a little sweetly, yet overall the group presented themselves as a proficient rock ensemble who'd filled their debut album with a full set of solid, refreshingly original songs.

In a c.1967 interview, Robin and Vince took as a compliment rumours that the Beatles sang on "In My Own Time" and "Every Christian Lion Hearted Man Will Show You", but denied this, claiming that they had written the first song years earlier.

According to music critic Bill Sherman:

Recently picked up the first of these releases, 1967's 1st, and I was surprised by how tunefully eclectic the darn thing was. In addition to its trio of Sensitive Guy hit singles (elegantly schlocky "Holiday," quiet desperation classic "New York Mining Disaster 1941" and the Motown-indebted "To Love Somebody" which would also be a British hit for Nina Simone), the album is a veritable fruit basket of sweet stuff: from the chamber psychedelia of "Red Chair, Fade Away" to the Moody Blues-driven chant-work of "Every Christian Lion Hearted Man Will Show You" to a surprisingly garage-stained nugget like "In My Own Time" (check out that "Taxman"-driven guitar), plus several risible slips of veddy veddy swingin' sixties whimsy and the songs are "Craise Finton Kirk Royal Academy of Arts" "Turn of the Century". And for those who simply must have their unabashed Gibbian wimpiness, there's "One Minute Woman" which features Barry Gibb getting down on his knees for a fickle and ungrateful lass.

Jim Miller at Rolling Stone said that this album, along with Horizontal and Idea, "can be easily considered as a group". K. Kanitz described "Turn of the Century" as having "lush orchestration and classic vocals from the Brothers Gibb."

== Track listing ==
All tracks are written by Barry and Robin Gibb, except for songs with asterisks, which are by Barry, Robin and Maurice Gibb.

Side one
No.	Title	Writer(s)	Lead vocals	Length
1.	"Turn of the Century"		Barry and Robin	2:25
2.	"Holiday"		Robin and Barry	2:53
3.	"Red Chair, Fade Away"		Barry	2:16
4.	"One Minute Woman"		Barry	2:18
5.	"In My Own Time"		Barry and Robin	2:15
6.	"Every Christian Lion Hearted Man Will Show You"	*	Barry and Robin	3:38
7.	"Craise Finton Kirk Royal Academy of Arts"		Robin	2:16

Side two
No.	Title	Writer(s)	Lead vocals	Length
1.	"New York Mining Disaster 1941"		Barry and Robin	2:09
2.	"Cucumber Castle"		Barry	2:04
3.	"To Love Somebody"		Barry	3:00
4.	"I Close My Eyes"	*	Barry and Robin	2:22
5.	"I Can't See Nobody"		Robin	3:45
6.	"Please Read Me"		Barry, Robin & Maurice	2:15
7.	"Close Another Door"	*	Robin and Barry	3:29

Bee Gees' 1st – 2006 edition (Disc 2)
No.	Title	Writer(s)	Lead vocal(s)	Length
1.	"Turn of the Century" (Early Version)		Barry and Robin	2:21
2.	"One Minute Woman" (Early Version)		Barry and Robin	2:17
3.	"Gilbert Green"		Barry and Robin	3:05
4.	"New York Mining Disaster 1941" (Version 1)		Robin	2:03
5.	"House of Lords"		Robin	2:46
6.	"Cucumber Castle" (Early Version)		Barry	2:01
7.	"Harry Braff" (Early Alternate Version)		Robin	3:08
8.	"I Close My Eyes" (Early Version)		Barry and Robin	2:26
9.	"I've Got to Learn"	*	Robin	2:48
10.	"I Can't See Nobody" (Alternate Take)		Robin	3:49
11.	"All Around My Clock"	*	Barry and Robin	1:59
12.	"Mr. Wallor's Wailing Wall"		Robin	2:35
13.	"Craise Finton Kirk Royal Academy of Arts"		Robin	2:16
14.	"New York Mining Disaster 1941" (Version Two)		Robin	2:39

== Personnel ==
Bee Gees

- Barry Gibb – lead, harmony and backing vocals; rhythm guitar
- Robin Gibb – lead, harmony and backing vocals; organ
- Maurice Gibb – harmony and backing vocals, bass, rhythm guitar, piano, Mellotron, organ, harpsichord
- Vince Melouney – lead guitar
- Colin Petersen – drums

Additional musicians and production

- Phil Dennys – orchestral arrangement on #3, 4 (side 1) and #1, 4 (side 2)
- Bill Shepherd – orchestral arrangement
- Mike Claydon – audio engineer
- Robert Stigwood, Ossie Byrne – producer
- Klaus Voormann – cover art

== Charts ==
=== Weekly charts ===
Chart	Position
Australian Kent Music Report	10
French SNEP Albums Chart	2
Norwegian VG-lista Albums Chart	5
UK Albums Chart	8
US Billboard 200	7
West German Media Control Albums Chart	4

=== Year-end charts ===
Chart (1968)	Position
Norwegian VG-lista Albums Chart	18

1979 reissue

Chart	Position
France (SNEP)	2
