= Cherry Red (song) =

Song by the Bee Gees
- A-side: "I Want Home"
- Released: March 1966
- Recorded: February 1966
- Genre: Sunshine pop
- Length: 3:07
- Label: Leedon / Festival Records Pty Ltd
- Songwriter: Barry Gibb
- Producer: Joe Halford

"Cherry Red" is a song by the Bee Gees, written by Barry Gibb, released as the B-side of "I Want Home" in March 1966, and has become one of the famous Bee Gees songs in the Philippines and Brazil. The song's opening chord was E followed by Barry singing Where are you?.

"Cherry Red" is a ballad featuring a harmony by Barry and Robin. It was recorded around February 1966 in Festival Studios, Sydney, during the same time as "I Want Home". Colin Petersen thinks he played drums on the two tracks.

== Release ==
Unlike many of the Bee Gees' Australian tracks, this single reached charts outside of Australia, in the Philippines, Brazil and São Paulo, all of which it reached top ten in.

== Personnel ==
- Barry Gibb — lead and harmony vocal, guitar
- Robin Gibb — lead and harmony vocal
- Maurice Gibb — guitar, organ
- Colin Petersen — drums

== Chart performance ==
Chart (1968–1970)	Peak position
Philippines	7
São Paulo (Brazil)	8
Brazil	5
