= I Was a Lover, a Leader of Men =

Single by Barry Gibb and the Bee Gees

from the album The Bee Gees Sing and Play 14 Barry Gibb Songs
- B-side: "And the Children Laughing"(Australia); "How Love Was True"(Philippines)
- Released: November 1965 (Australia); January 1966 (Philippines)
- Recorded: October 1965; Festival Studio, Sydney
- Genre: Folk rock
- Length: 3:35
- Label: Leedon (Australia); Festival (Philippines)
- Songwriter(s): Barry Gibb
- Producer(s): Bill Shepherd

The Bee Gees singles chronology
"Wine and Women" (1965)	"I Was a Lover, a Leader of Men" (1965)	"I Want Home" (1966)

"I Was a Lover, a Leader of Men" is a single released in November 1965 (in Australia, and in January 1966 in the Philippines), recorded by the Bee Gees, and written by Barry Gibb. In Australia, the B-side was "And the Children Laughing". It is also the first track of the Bee Gees' first album, The Bee Gees Sing and Play 14 Barry Gibb Songs. This song won Barry a songwriting award.

== Chart performance ==
The song reached number 85 in Australia.

== Personnel ==
- Barry Gibb – lead vocals, rhythm guitar
- Robin Gibb – harmony and backing vocals
- Maurice Gibb – harmony and backing vocals, 12-string lead guitar
- Uncredited musicians – drums, piano
