= Spicks and Specks (album) =

Studio album by the Bee Gees
- Released: November 1966
- Recorded: 1966
- Studio: St. Clair Studios, Hurstville
- Genre: Beat
- Length: 29:14
- Label: Spin (AUS)
- Producer: Nat Kipner

The Bee Gees chronology
The Bee Gees Sing and Play 14 Barry Gibb Songs (1965)	Spicks and Specks (1966)	Bee Gees' 1st (1967)

Singles from Spicks and Specks
- 1. "Monday's Rain" Released: June 1966 (AUS); 2. "Spicks and Specks" Released: September 1966 (AUS), February 1967 (UK); 3. "Born a Man" Released: February 1967 (AUS)

Spicks and Specks is the second studio album by the Bee Gees. It was released in November 1966, on Spin. Primarily written by Barry Gibb, the album includes the first Robin Gibb composition "I Don't Know Why I Bother With Myself" and a Maurice Gibb composition "Where Are You".

Unlike the previous album The Bee Gees Sing and Play 14 Barry Gibb Songs, which had only contained three songs that had not previously appeared on singles and thus functioned more as a compilation, Spicks and Specks was an album of original songs.

In 1968, US ATCO and UK Polydor, under contract from Festival, reissued this album, re-sequenced, as Rare, Precious and Beautiful.

== History and recording ==
Nat Kipner brought the Bee Gees to St. Clair Studio, Hurstville (in Sydney's southern suburbs). It was a small place behind a butcher's shop in a strip shopping centre, owned and operated by Kipner's friend Ossie Byrne, a sound engineer who was working wonders with even more modest facilities than Festival Studios. Both Kipner and Barry Gibb recall that the recording equipment was just two one-track tape decks and a mixer. But many Festival acts would make the trip to Hurstville to get the benefit of Byrne's talents and the more relaxed artist-oriented atmosphere. Among them was the band Steve and the Board, led by Kipner's son, Steve Kipner, all of whom became friends with the Bee Gees because both groups were allowed the run of the studio whenever it was not booked for other performers. The Bee Gees had never had much studio time before. Byrne let them experiment with sound effects and overdubs, while Kipner gave them plenty of feedback on their music.

On some tracks, the drums were played by Colin Petersen from Steve and the Board, who would later be the Bee Gees' regular drummer until August 1969. Maurice Gibb had a piano to play and electronics he was allowed to try out, Robin Gibb learned to double-track his voice, and Barry had precious time to work with his group to make recordings as good as those by the other performers who had recorded so many of his songs. The one-track tape machines required the use of sound-on-sound for all overdubs. An instrumental base track was recorded first. Then it was played back while the group sang or played, and the playback and microphones were mixed together and recorded to another tape machine. If an additional track was needed, the process could be repeated. Each track however added another layer of tape hiss. Some of these recordings must have gone to at least a third track. The exact chronology of the St. Clair sessions remains a mystery, one that will not be solved since the studio documentation is long gone. The two songs for "Monday's Rain" single were certainly recorded by 8 May 1966, based on a press report.

The album's initial title was Monday's Rain and a very small number of albums was actually manufactured with this name. After the single "Spicks and Specks" became a national hit record, the album was renamed as "Spicks and Specks", with this song replacing "All of My Life" as the first song of side two.

== Track listing ==
All tracks are written by Barry Gibb except where noted.

Side one
No.	Title	Writer(s)	Lead vocals	Length
1.	"Monday's Rain"		Robin and Barry	2:58
2.	"How Many Birds"		Barry	1:57
3.	"Playdown"		Barry, Robin and Maurice	2:54
4.	"Second Hand People"		Barry, Robin and Maurice	2:10
5.	"I Don't Know Why I Bother With Myself"	Robin Gibb	Robin	2:43
6.	"Big Chance"		Robin and Barry	1:40

Side two
No.	Title	Writer(s)	Lead vocals	Length
1.	"Spicks and Specks"		Barry	2:52
2.	"Jingle Jangle"		Robin	2:10
3.	"Tint of Blue"	Barry Gibb, Robin Gibb	Barry	2:05
4.	"Where Are You"	Maurice Gibb	Maurice	2:10
5.	"Born a Man"		Barry	3:10
6.	"Glass House"	Barry Gibb, Robin Gibb	Robin	2:25

== Personnel ==
Bee Gees

- Barry Gibb – lead, harmony and backing vocals; rhythm guitar
- Robin Gibb – lead, harmony and backing vocals; harmonica
- Maurice Gibb – harmony and backing vocals, acoustic and bass guitar, piano, lead vocals on “Where Are You”

Guest and additional musicians

- John Robinson – bass guitar
- Steve Kipner – harmony and backing vocals
- Colin Petersen – drums
- Russell Barnsley – drums
- Geoff Grant – trumpet
- Uncredited musicians – backing guitar, drums

Production

- Ossie Byrne – sound engineer
- Nat Kipner – producer

== Release and aftermath ==
Kipner said on the liner notes of the album: 'This album is made up of a great variety of compositions. As instrumentalists they have mastered practically every instrument in the book. As harmonists and vocalists they are acknowledged as the foremost in this country.'

Their subsequent tour took the Bee Gees to the Kyeamba Smith Hall at Wagga Wagga Showground in New South Wales, where such acts as Billy Thorpe and the Aztecs and the Easybeats also performed. The only catch was getting the elusive hit record; the Bee Gees ended up recording two albums in 1966, the first delayed until they had a hit song to sell it, and the second finally scrapped and used as a publisher's demo reel to sell the songs to other performers. The hit was the title track, their first national best-seller, but it came so late that they were already on the boat to England when they heard about it in late 1966.

Kipner tore up his contract with the Bee Gees, but he did reserve the Australian rights to whatever they recorded over the next several years.
