= Spicks and Specks (song) =

Single by the Bee Gees

from the album Spicks and Specks
- B-side: "I Am the World"
- Released: September 22, 1966 (Australia); February 1967 (UK)
- Recorded: July 1966
- Genre: Pop rock; beat; sunshine pop
- Length: 2:52
- Label: Spin (Australia); Polydor
- Songwriter: Barry Gibb
- Producers: Nat Kipner, Ossie Byrne

The Bee Gees singles chronology
"Monday's Rain" (1966)	"Spicks and Specks" (1966)	"Born a Man" (1967)

"Spicks and Specks" is a song by the Bee Gees, written by Barry Gibb. When the song was released in September 1966, the single reached No. 4 on the Go-Set Australian National Top 40 (No. 1 on other Australian charts), and when the song was released in other countries in February 1967, it reached No. 28 in Germany, No. 2 in the Netherlands and No. 1 in New Zealand.

== Recording ==
"Spicks and Specks", a ballad built around a strong piano beat, is dated to early July in the memory of Geoff Grant (Geoffrey Streeter), who played the trumpet. Grant recalls working three nights in a row on four songs: "Spicks and Specks", "I Am the World", "All by Myself", and "The Storm". There were no charts, so Barry sang what he wanted live, and Grant copied it. Some other artists whose disks came out in August recall hearing "Spicks and Specks" being worked on or completed, further confirming that early July is the approximate date of the song's recording.

== Release ==
The single entered the Sydney charts at the end of September and stayed in the top 40 for 19 weeks, peaking at number 3. It appeared on the Go-Set National Top 40 for sixteen weeks, where it reached number 4 early in November.

This track was featured at the end of the thirteenth episode "Forget" from the fifth season of AMC's The Walking Dead.

== Legacy ==
The song served as the namesake for Spicks and Specks, a long running and highly successful Australian music quiz show. A version of the song also appears in the show's opening titles.

== Personnel ==
Bee Gees

- Barry Gibb – lead and backing vocals
- Robin Gibb – backing vocals
- Maurice Gibb – piano, bass, electric guitar

Additional musicians and production staff

- Steve Kipner – backing vocals
- Russell Barnsley – drums
- Geoff Grant – trumpet
- Nat Kipner, Ossie Byrne – producers

== Charts ==
Chart	Year	Peak position
Australia Go-Set Charts	1966	4
Netherlands Dutch Top 40 Charts	1967	2
Germany Media Control Charts	1967	28
New Zealand Recorded Music NZ Charts	1967	1
Japan Oricon Singles Chart	1967	56
