= Ossie Byrne =

Australian record producer

Oswald Russell "Ossie" Byrne (1926 – December 1983) was an Australian record producer, best known for producing the early recordings of The Bee Gees, including their first international hit, "New York Mining Disaster 1941".

The youngest of nine children, he was born into a musical family in Queanbeyan, New South Wales. He learned to play cornet and trumpet in his youth and joined a Salvation Army band. He fought with the RAAF in World War II, being injured and losing an eye in New Guinea. After the war he played with local groups in Canberra and Sydney, as well as working as a finance officer, and in the mid-1950s he moved to Wollongong where he built a small recording studio in his house. In 1961 he recorded a local group, the Del-Fi's, whose recordings had some success, and in 1965 he moved to Hurstville, Sydney and set up a new studio behind a butcher's shop.

Record releases by the Bee Gees in Australia had been relatively unsuccessful commercially at that time, but Byrne was a fan and, in 1966, offered the group almost unlimited recording time to develop their sound. He also became the group's co-manager. At the same time, he worked as producer with successful Australian pop singer Ronnie Burns. In November 1966 the Bee Gees had their first major success, "Spicks and Specks". The group decided to develop their career in England, and Byrne accompanied them. Arriving in England in February 1967, the group immediately won a recording contract with Robert Stigwood, and Byrne recorded the single "New York Mining Disaster 1941" with them at the IBC Studios in Portland Place. It became a hit in the UK, and internationally, and Byrne then produced the group's album, Bee Gees' 1st (although the group had released two albums previously in Australia).

After that album, Byrne did not work with the Bee Gees again, as the group developed their own independent skills. Byrne remained in London, and produced the only album by folk rock band Eclection in 1968, and the first album by progressive rock band Cressida in 1969.

Byrne opened a studio called Village Way Recorders in Rayners Lane in Harrow, North London which he owned till his death at which time he left it in his will to Paul Layton of the New Seekers. When he went into hospital during his final illness, Village Way called in engineer/producer Paul "Doc" Stewart to keep the studio running. Stewart, in turn, with the help of Roy Williams of Nervous Records and Steve Rispin made Village Way the leading centre for neo-rockabilly and psychobilly until Ossie's death at which point they moved to Tin Pan Alley studios in Denmark Street. Byrne died in London in 1983, of cancer. The Bee Gees dedicated their 1987 comeback album, E.S.P., to his memory.
