= List of songs recorded by the Bee Gees =

Songs recorded by the Bee Gees
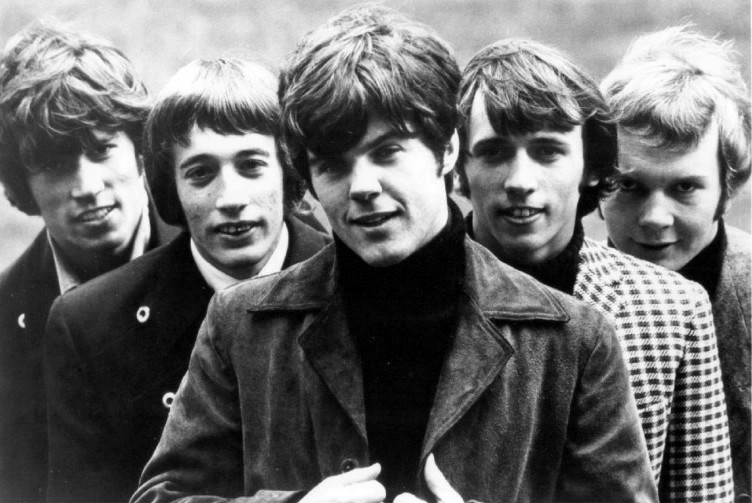
- The Bee Gees, c. 1970
- Songs: 303

The following is a list of all officially released songs recorded by the Bee Gees from 1967 to 2001. Songs recorded in Australia and covers of the Beatles' songs are not included.

- The columns labeled "title", "year", and "album" list each song title, the year in which the song was recorded, and the official studio album or compilation album on which a Bee Gees' version of the song first appeared.
- The "songwriter(s)" column lists the writer(s) of each song.

== Songs ==
Title	Year	Album	Songwriter(s)	Lead vocal(s)	Peak position		Notes
Title	Year	Album	Songwriter(s)	Lead vocal(s)	UK	US	Notes
"The 1st Mistake I Made"	1970	2 Years On	B Gibb	Barry	—	—	
"2 Years On"	1970	2 Years On	M & R Gibb	Robin	—	—	
"855-7019"	1993	N/A	B, M & R Gibb	Barry	—	—	B-Side of "How To Fall In Love, Part 1" in 1994
"Above And Beyond"	1993	Size Isn't Everything	B, M & R Gibb	Barry, Maurice	—	—	
"Alive"	1972	To Whom It May Concern	B & M Gibb	Barry	—	34	
"All Around My Clock"	1967	The Studio Albums 1967-1968, Bee Gees 1st	B, M & R Gibb	Barry, Robin	—	—	
"All This Making Love"	1975	Main Course	B & R Gibb	Barry, Robin	—	—	
"Alone"	1995	Still Waters	B, M & R Gibb	Barry, Robin	5	28	
"Alone Again"	1970	2 Years On	M & R Gibb	Robin	—	—	
"And The Sun Will Shine"	1967	Horizontal	B, M & R Gibb	Robin	—	—	
"Angel Of Mercy"	2000	Mythology	B, M & R Gibb	Maurice, Samantha	—	—	Part of the recordings for This Is Where I Came In
"Angela"	1987	E.S.P.	B, M & R Gibb	Barry	—	—	
"Anything For You"	1993	Size Isn't Everything	B, M & R Gibb	Barry	—	—	
"Baby As You Turn Away"	1975	Main Course	B, M & R Gibb	Barry, Maurice	—	—	
"Back Home"	1970	2 Years On	B, M & R Gibb	Barry, Maurice, Robin	—	—	
"Backtafunk"	1987	E.S.P.	B, M & R Gibb	Barry	—	—	
"Bad Bad Dreams"	1972	To Whom It May Concern	B, M & R Gibb	Barry, Robin	—	—	
"Barker Of The UFO"	1967	Tales From The Brothers Gibb	B Gibb	Barry	—	—	B-Side of "Massachusetts" (UK only) in 1967
"Be Who You Are"	1981	Living Eyes	B Gibb	Barry	—	—	
"Birdie Told Me"	1967	Horizontal	B, M & R Gibb	Barry	—	—	
"Black Diamond"	1968	Odessa	B, M & R Gibb	Robin	—	—	
"Blue Island"	1993	Size Isn't Everything	B, M & R Gibb	Barry, Robin	—	—	
"Bodyguard"	1988	One	B, M & R Gibb	Barry, Robin	—	—	
"Boogie Child"	1976	Children Of The World	B, M & R Gibb	Barry	—	12	
"Breakout"	1983	Staying Alive	B, M & R Gibb	Barry	—	—	
"The Bridge"	2000	Mythology	M Gibb, Adam Gibb, Samantha Gibb	Maurice, Adam, Samantha	—	—	Part of the recordings for This Is Where I Came In
"Bridges Crossing Rivers"	1968	The Studio Albums 1967-1968, Idea	B, M & R Gibb	Barry, Maurice, Robin	—	—	
"The British Opera"	1968	Odessa	B, M & R Gibb	Instrumental	—	—	
"Bury Me Down By The River"	1969	Cucumber Castle	B & M Gibb	Barry	—	—	
"Can't Keep A Good Man Down"	1976	Children Of The World	B, M & R Gibb	Barry, Robin	—	—	
"Castles In The Air"	1972	A Kick In The Head Is Worth Eight In The Pants	B, M & R Gibb	Barry, Robin	—	—	Unreleased
"The Chance Of Love"	1969	Cucumber Castle	B & M Gibb	Barry	—	—	
"The Change Is Made"	1967	Horizontal	B, M & R Gibb	Barry	—	—	
"Charade"	1973	Mr. Natural	B & R Gibb	Barry, Robin	—	—	
"Children Of The World"	1976	Children Of The World	B & R Gibb	Barry	—	—	
"Chocolate Symphony"	1968	The Studio Albums 1967-1968, Idea	B, M & R Gibb	Barry	—	—	
"Close Another Door"	1967	Bee Gees 1st	B, M & R Gibb	Barry, Robin	—	—	
"Closer Than Close"	1996	Still Waters	B, M & R Gibb	Maurice	—	—	
"Come Home Johnny Bridie"	1972	Life In A Tin Can	B Gibb	Barry	—	—	
"Come On Over"	1975	Main Course	B & R Gibb	Barry, Robin	—	—	
"Country Lanes"	1975	Main Course	B & R Gibb	Barry, Robin	—	—	
"Country Woman"	1971	Tales From The Brothers Gibb	M Gibb	Maurice	—	—	B-side of "How Can You Mend a Broken Heart" in 1971
"Craise Finton Kirk Royal Academy Of Arts"	1967	Bee Gees 1st	B & R Gibb	Robin	—	—	
"Crazy For Your Love"	1987	E.S.P.	B, M & R Gibb	Barry	79	—	
"Cryin' Every Day"	1981	Living Eyes	B, M & R Gibb	Barry, Robin	—	—	
"Cucumber Castle"	1967	Bee Gees 1st	B & R Gibb	Barry	—	—	
"Day Time Girl"	1967	Horizontal	B, M & R Gibb	Barry, Maurice, Robin	—	—	
"Dear Mr. Kissinger"	1973	A Kick In The Head Is Worth Eight In The Pants	B, M & R Gibb	Barry, Robin	—	—	Unreleased
"Dearest"	1971	Trafalgar	B & R Gibb	Barry, Robin	—	—	
"Deeply, Deeply Me"	1967	The Studio Albums 1967-1968, Horizontal	B, M & R Gibb	Robin	—	—	
"Déjà Vu"	2000	This Is Where I Came In	B, M & R Gibb	Robin	—	—	
"Dimensions"	1990	High Civilization	B, M & R Gibb	Maurice	—	—	
"Dogs"	1973	Mr. Natural	B & R Gibb	Barry	—	—	
"Don't Fall In Love With Me"	1981	Living Eyes	B, M & R Gibb	Robin	—	—	
"Don't Forget To Remember"	1969	Cucumber Castle	B & M Gibb	Barry	2	73	
"Don't Wanna Live Inside Myself"	1971	Trafalgar	B Gibb	Barry	—	53	
"Down The Road"	1973	Mr. Natural	B & R Gibb	Barry	—	—	
"Down To Earth"	1968	Idea	B, M & R Gibb	Maurice, Robin	—	—	
"E.S.P."	1987	E.S.P.	B, M & R Gibb	Barry, Robin	51	—	
"The Earnest Of Being George"	1967	Horizontal	B, M & R Gibb	Barry	—	—	
"Edge Of The Universe"	1975	Main Course	B & R Gibb	Barry, Robin	—	23	Live version charted in 1976
"Edison"	1968	Odessa	B, M & R Gibb	Barry, Robin	—	—	
"Ellan Vannin"	1997	N/A	Eliza Craven-Green	Robin	—	—	Released as a charity single in 1998
"Elisa"	1972	Tales From The Brothers Gibb	B, M & R Gibb	Barry, Maurice, Robin	—	—	B-Side of "Wouldn't I Be Someone" in 1973
"Embrace"	2000	This Is Where I Came In	R Gibb	Robin	—	—	
"Emotion"	1994	Their Greatest Hits: The Record	B & R Gibb	Barry	—	—	Hit version by Samantha Sang reached #3 (US) and #11 (UK) in 1977. Bee Gees recording intended for scrapped 1995 album so-called Love Songs
"Every Christian Lion Hearted Man Will Show You"	1967	Bee Gees 1st	B, M & R Gibb	Barry, Robin	—	—	
"Every Second, Every Minute"	1970	2 Years On	B Gibb	Barry	—	—	
"Evolution"	1990	High Civilization	B, M & R Gibb	Barry	—	—	
"The Extra Mile"	2000	This Is Where I Came In	B, M & R Gibb	Barry, Robin	—	—	
"Fallen Angel"	1992	Size Isn't Everything	B, M & R Gibb	Robin	—	—	
"Fanny (Be Tender With My Love)"	1975	Main Course	B, M & R Gibb	Barry, Maurice, Robin	—	12	
"First Of May"	1968	Odessa	B, M & R Gibb	Barry	6	37	
"Flesh And Blood"	1988	One	B, M & R Gibb	Robin	—	—	
"For Whom The Bell Tolls"	1992	Size Isn't Everything	B, M & R Gibb	Barry, Robin	4	109	
"Gena's Theme"	1968	The Studio Albums 1967-1968, Idea	B, M & R Gibb	Instrumental	—	—	
"Ghost Train"	1990	High Civilization	B, M & R Gibb	Barry, Robin	—	—	
"Gilbert Green"	1967	The Studio Albums 1967-1968, Bee Gees 1st	B & R Gibb	Barry, Robin	—	—	
"Give A Hand, Take A Hand"	1973	Mr. Natural	B & M Gibb	Barry	—	—	
"Give Your Best"	1968	Odessa	B, M & R Gibb	Barry	—	—	
"Giving Up The Ghost"	1987	E.S.P.	B, M & R Gibb	Maurice, Robin	—	—	
"Grease"	1997	One Night Only [live]	B Gibb	Barry	—	—	Hit version by Frankie Valli reached #1 (US) and #3 (UK) in 1978
"The Greatest Man In The World"	1971	Trafalgar	B Gibb	Barry	—	—	
"Guilty"	1997	One Night Only [live], Guilty	B Gibb	Barry	—	—	Hit version by Barbra Streisand duet with Barry Gibb in 1980
"Had A Lot Of Love Last Night"	1974	Mr. Natural	B, M & R Gibb	Barry	—	—	
"Happy Ever After"	1990	High Civilization	B, M & R Gibb	Barry	—	—	
"Harry Braff"	1967	Horizontal	B, M & R Gibb	Barry, Maurice, Robin	—	—	
"Harry's Gate"	1973	A Kick In The Head Is Worth Eight In The Pants	B, M & R Gibb	Barry, Robin	—	—	Unreleased
"Haunted House"	1993	Size Isn't Everything	B, M & R Gibb	Barry, Robin	—	—	
"He's A Liar"	1981	Living Eyes	B, M & R Gibb	Barry	—	30	
"Heart Like Mine"	1993	Size Isn't Everything	B, M & R Gibb	Barry, Robin	—	—	
"Heartbreaker"	1994	Their Greatest Hits: The Record	B, M & R Gibb	Barry	—	—	Hit version by Dionne Warwick reached #10 (US) and #2 (UK) in 1982. Bee Gees recording intended for scrapped 1995 album so-called Love Songs
"Heavy Breathing"	1973	Mr. Natural	B & R Gibb	Barry, Robin	—	—	
"High Civilization"	1990	High Civilization	B, M & R Gibb	Barry, Robin	—	—	
"Holiday"	1967	Bee Gees 1st	B & R Gibb	Barry, Robin	—	16	
"Home Again Rivers"	1972	A Kick In The Head Is Worth Eight In The Pants	B, M & R Gibb	Robin	—	—	Unreleased
"Horizontal"	1967	Horizontal	B, M & R Gibb	Barry, Robin	—	—	
"House Of Lords"	1967	The Studio Albums 1967-1968, Bee Gees 1st	B, M & R Gibb	Robin	—	—	
"House Of Shame"	1989	One	B, M & R Gibb	Barry, Maurice	—	—	
"How Can You Mend A Broken Heart"	1971	Trafalgar	B & R Gibb	Barry, Robin	—	1	Writing credit for Maurice added in 2009 on The Ultimate Bee Gees
"How Deep Is Your Love"	1977	Saturday Night Fever	B, M & R Gibb	Barry, Robin	3	1	
"How To Fall In Love, Pt. 1"	1992	Size Isn't Everything	B, M & R Gibb	Barry	30	—	
"Human Sacrifice"	1990	High Civilization	B, M & R Gibb	Barry	—	—	
"I Can Bring Love"	1972	To Whom It May Concern	B Gibb	Barry	—	—	
"I Can't Let You Go"	1973	Mr. Natural	B, M & R Gibb	Barry	—	—	
"I Can't See Nobody"	1967	Bee Gees 1st	B & R Gibb	Robin	—	128	
"I Close My Eyes"	1967	Bee Gees 1st	B, M & R Gibb	Barry, Robin	—	—	
"I Could Not Love You More"	1995	Still Waters	B, M & R Gibb	Barry	14	—	
"I Don't Wanna Be The One"	1972	Life In A Tin Can	B Gibb	Barry, Robin	—	—	
"I Have Decided To Join The Air Force"	1968	Idea	B, M & R Gibb	Barry, Maurice, Robin	—	—	
"I Held A Party"	1972	To Whom It May Concern	B, M & R Gibb	Barry, Robin	—	—	
"I Laugh In Your Face"	1968	Odessa	B, M & R Gibb	Barry, Robin	—	—	
"I Lay Down And Die"	1969	Cucumber Castle	B & M Gibb	Barry	—	—	
"I Love You Too Much"	1983	Staying Alive	B, M & R Gibb	Barry	—	—	
"I.O.I.O."	1969	Cucumber Castle	B & M Gibb	Barry, Maurice	49	94	
"I Started A Joke"	1968	Idea	B, M & R Gibb	Robin	—	6	
"I Still Love You"	1981	Living Eyes	B, M & R Gibb	Robin	—	—	
"I Surrender"	1995	Still Waters	B, M & R Gibb	Barry	—	—	
"I Was The Child"	1969	Cucumber Castle	B & M Gibb	Barry	—	—	
"I Will"	1995	Still Waters	B, M & R Gibb	Barry, Robin	—	—	
"I Will Be There"	2000	N/A, This Is Where I Came In	B, M & R Gibb	Barry, Robin	—	—	B-side of "This Is Where I Came In"
"Idea"	1968	Idea	B, M & R Gibb	Barry, Maurice, Robin	—	—	
"If I Can't Have You"	1977	Bee Gees Greatest	B, M & R Gibb	Barry	—	—	Hit version by Yvonne Elliman reached #1 (US) and #4 (UK) in 1977 also by Kim Wilde reached #12 (UK) in 1993
"If I Only Had My Mind On Something Else"	1969	Cucumber Castle	B & M Gibb	Barry	—	91	
"I'm Satisfied"	1978	Spirits Having Flown	B, M & R Gibb	Barry	—	—	
"I'm Weeping"	1970	2 Years On	R Gibb	Robin	—	—	
"Immortality"	1997	One Night Only [live], Their Greatest Hits: The Record	B, M & R Gibb	Barry	—	—	Hit version by Céline Dion reached #5 in 1997 in the UK. Bee Gees' studio version recorded and released in 2001 was the last song recorded by the group
"In My Own Time"	1967	Bee Gees 1st	B & R Gibb	Barry, Robin	—	—	
"In The Summer Of His Years"	1968	Idea	B, M & R Gibb	Robin	—	—	
"Indian Gin And Whisky Dry"	1968	Idea	B, M & R Gibb	Robin	—	—	
"Irresistible Force"	1995	Still Waters	B, M & R Gibb	Barry, Robin	—	—	
"Islands In The Stream"	1997	One Night Only [live], Their Greatest Hits: The Record	B, M & R Gibb	Barry, Maurice	—	—	Hit version by Kenny Rogers & Dolly Parton reached #1 (US) and #7 (UK) in 1983. Bee Gees' studio version recorded and released in 2001
"Israel"	1971	Trafalgar	B Gibb	Barry	—	—	
"It Doesn't Matter Much To Me"	1973	Tales From The Brothers Gibb	B, M & R Gibb	Barry, Robin	—	—	Written in 1973 for A Kick in the Head Is Worth Eight in the Pants. Re-recorded and released as the B-side of Mr. Natural in 1974
"It's Just The Way"	1971	Trafalgar	M Gibb	Maurice	—	—	
"It's My Neighborhood"	1988	One	B, M & R Gibb	Barry	—	—	
"I've Got To Learn"	1967	The Studio Albums 1967-1968, Bee Gees 1st	B, M & R Gibb	Robin	—	—	
"I've Gotta Get A Message To You"	1968	Idea	B, M & R Gibb	Barry, Robin	1	8	
"Jesus In Heaven"	1973	A Kick In The Head Is Worth Eight In The Pants	B, M & R Gibb	Barry	—	—	Unreleased
"Jive Talkin'"	1975	Main Course	B, M & R Gibb	Barry	4	1	Hit version by Boogie Box High reached #7 (UK) in 1987
"Jumbo"	1968	Tales From The Brothers Gibb	B, M & R Gibb	Barry	25	57	
"Just In Case"	2000	This Is Where I Came In (Bonus Tracks)	B, M & R Gibb	Barry, Robin	—	—	
"Kilburn Towers"	1968	Idea	B, M & R Gibb	Barry	—	—	
"King And Country"	1973	Tales From The Brothers Gibb	B, M & R Gibb	Barry	—	—	B-Side of "Wouldn't I Be Someone" (Germany only) in 1973
"Kiss Of Life"	1992	Size Isn't Everything	B, M & R Gibb	Barry, Robin	—	—	
"Kitty Can"	1968	Idea	B, M & R Gibb	Barry, Maurice	—	—	
"Lamplight"	1968	Odessa	B, M & R Gibb	Robin	—	—	
"Lay It On Me"	1970	2 Years On	M Gibb	Maurice	—	—	
"Lemons Never Forget"	1967	Horizontal	B, M & R Gibb	Barry	—	—	
"Let There Be Love"	1968	Idea	B, M & R Gibb	Barry, Maurice, Robin	—	—	
"Life Am I Wasting My Time"	1973	A Kick In The Head Is Worth Eight In The Pants	B, M & R Gibb	Barry, Robin	—	—	Unreleased
"Life Goes On"	1983	Staying Alive	B, M & R Gibb	Barry	—	—	
"Lion In Winter"	1971	Trafalgar	B & R Gibb	Barry, Robin	—	—	
"Live Or Die (Hold Me Like A Child)"	1987	E.S.P.	B, M & R Gibb	Barry, Maurice	—	—	
"Living Eyes"	1981	Living Eyes	B, M & R Gibb	Barry	—	45	
"Living In Chicago"	1972	Life In A Tin Can	B, M & R Gibb	Barry, Maurice, Robin	—	—	
"Living Together"	1978	Spirits Having Flown	B, M & R Gibb	Barry, Robin	—	—	
"Lonely Days"	1970	2 Years On	B, M & R Gibb	Barry, Maurice, Robin	33	3	
"A Lonely Violin"	1972	A Kick In The Head Is Worth Eight In The Pants	B, M & R Gibb	Barry	—	—	Unreleased
"The Longest Night"	1987	E.S.P.	B, M & R Gibb	Robin	—	—	
"Loose Talk Costs Lives"	2000	This Is Where I Came In	B Gibb	Barry	—	—	
"The Lord"	1969	Cucumber Castle	B & M Gibb	Barry	—	—	
"Losers And Lovers"	1972	A Kick In The Head Is Worth Eight In The Pants	B, M & R Gibb	Barry, Robin	—	—	Unreleased
"Lost In Your Love"	1974	Mr. Natural	B Gibb	Barry	—	—	
"Love Is Blind"	1998	Too Much Heaven: Songs Of The Brothers Gibb	B, M & R Gibb	Barry	—	—	Released in 2004 on an American publisher's promotional set
"Love Me"	1976	Children Of The World	B & R Gibb	Barry, Robin	—	—	
"Love Never Dies"	1995	Still Waters (Bonus Tracks)	B, M & R Gibb	Maurice, Robin	—	—	
"Love So Right"	1976	Children Of The World	B, M & R Gibb	Barry	41	3	
"Love You Inside Out"	1978	Spirits Having Flown	B, M & R Gibb	Barry	13	1	
"Lovers"	1976	Children Of The World	B, M & R Gibb	Barry, Robin	—	—	
"Man For All Seasons"	1970	2 Years On	B, M & R Gibb	Barry, Maurice, Robin	—	—	
"Man In The Middle"	2000	This Is Where I Came In	B & M Gibb	Maurice	—	—	
"Marley Purt Drive"	1968	Odessa	B, M & R Gibb	Barry	—	—	
"Massachusetts"	1967	Horizontal	B, M & R Gibb	Barry, Maurice, Robin	1	11	
"Melody Fair"	1968	Odessa	B, M & R Gibb	Barry, Maurice	—	—	
"Method To My Madness"	1972	Life In A Tin Can	B, M & R Gibb	Barry, Robin	—	—	
"Miracles Happen"	1995	Still Waters	B, M & R Gibb	Barry	—	—	
"More Than A Woman"	1977	Saturday Night Fever	B, M & R Gibb	Barry	—	—	
"Morning Of My Life (In The Morning)"	1970	Melody, Best Of Bee Gees Vol. 2	B Gibb	Barry, Maurice, Robin	—	—	Written in 1966 in Australia, but re-recorded.
"Mr. Natural"	1974	Mr. Natural	B & R Gibb	Barry, Robin	—	93	
"Mr. Wallor's Wailing Wall"	1967	The Studio Albums 1967-1968, Bee Gees 1st	B & R Gibb	Robin	—	—	
"Mrs. Gillespie's Refrigerator"	1967	The Studio Albums 1967-1968, Horizontal	B, M & R Gibb	Barry, Robin	—	—	
"My Destiny"	1993	N/A	B, M & R Gibb	Barry, Robin	—	—	B-Side of "Paying the Price of Love" (UK only) in 1993
"My Life Has Been A Song"	1972	Life In A Tin Can	B, M & R Gibb	Barry, Robin	—	—	
"My Lover's Prayer"	1995	Still Waters	B, M & R Gibb	Barry, Robin	—	—	
"My Thing"	1969	Cucumber Castle	B & M Gibb	Maurice	—	—	
"My World"	1971	Best Of Bee Gees Vol. 2	B & R Gibb	Barry, Robin	16	16	
"Never Been Alone"	1972	To Whom It May Concern	R Gibb	Robin	—	—	
"Never Say Never Again"	1968	Odessa	B, M & R Gibb	Barry	—	—	
"New York Mining Disaster 1941"	1967	Bee Gees 1st	B & R Gibb	Barry, Robin	12	14	US copies added the parenthetical title (Have You Seen My Wife Mr. Jones)
"Night Fever"	1977	Saturday Night Fever	B, M & R Gibb	Barry	1	1	
"Nights On Broadway"	1975	Main Course	B, M & R Gibb	Barry, Maurice, Robin	—	7	
"Nobody's Someone"	1968	Sketches For Odessa	B, M & R Gibb	Barry	—	—	
"Nothing Could Be Good"	1981	Living Eyes	B, M & R Gibb & Albhy Galuten	Barry	—	—	
"Obsessions"	1995	Still Waters	B, M & R Gibb	Barry	—	—	
"Odessa (City On The Black Sea)"	1968	Odessa	B, M & R Gibb	Robin	—	—	
"Omega Man"	1992	Size Isn't Everything	B, M & R Gibb	Maurice	—	—	
"On Time"	1971	Tales From The Brothers Gibb	M Gibb	Maurice	—	—	B-Side of "My World" in 1972
"One"	1988	One	B, M & R Gibb	Barry	71	7	
"One Minute Woman"	1967	Bee Gees 1st	B & R Gibb	Barry, Robin	—	—	
"The Only Love"	1990	High Civilization	B, M & R Gibb	Barry	—	—	
"Ordinary Lives"	1988	One	B, M & R Gibb	Barry, Robin	54	—	
"(Our Love) Don't Throw It All Away"	1977	Bee Gees Greatest	B Gibb & Blue Weaver	Barry	—	—	Hit version by Andy Gibb reached #9 (US) and #32 (UK)
"Out Of Line"	1967	The Studio Albums 1967-1968, Horizontal	B, M & R Gibb	Barry, Robin	—	—	
"Overnight"	1987	E.S.P.	B, M & R Gibb	Maurice	—	—	
"Paper Mache, Cabbages & Kings"	1972	To Whom It May Concern	B, M & R Gibb	Barry, Robin	—	—	
"Paradise"	1981	Living Eyes	B, M & R Gibb	Barry, Robin	—	—	
"Party With No Name"	1990	High Civilization	B, M & R Gibb	Barry	—	—	
"Paying The Price Of Love"	1992	Size Isn't Everything	B, M & R Gibb	Barry	23	74	
"Pity"	1968	Sketches For Odessa	B, M & R Gibb	Barry	—	—	
"Please Don't Turn Out The Lights"	1972	To Whom It May Concern	B, M & R Gibb	Barry, Robin	—	—	
"Please Read Me"	1967	Bee Gees 1st	B, M & R Gibb	Barry, Maurice, Robin	—	—	
"Portrait Of Louise"	1970	2 Years On	B Gibb	Barry	—	—	
"Promise The Earth"	2000	This Is Where I Came In (Bonus Tracks)	B, M & R Gibb	Robin	—	—	
"Reaching Out"	1978	Spirits Having Flown	B, M & R Gibb	Barry	—	—	
"Really And Sincerely"	1967	Horizontal	B, M & R Gibb	Robin	—	—	
"Red Chair, Fade Away"	1967	Bee Gees 1st	B & R Gibb	Barry	—	—	
"Remembering"	1971	Trafalgar	B & R Gibb	Robin	—	—	
"Rest Your Love On Me"	1978	Bee Gees Greatest	B Gibb	Barry	—	—	B-side of "Too Much Heaven" in 1978. Written in 1976
"Ring My Bell"	1967	The Studio Albums 1967-1968, Horizontal	B, M & R Gibb	Barry, Robin	—	—	
"Rings Around The Moon"	1995	Still Waters (Bonus Tracks)	B, M & R Gibb	Robin	—	—	
"Road To Alaska"	1972	To Whom It May Concern	B, M & R Gibb	Barry, Robin	—	—	
"Rocky L. A."	1973	A Kick In The Head Is Worth Eight In The Pants	B, M & R Gibb	Barry, Robin	—	—	Unreleased
"Run To Me"	1972	To Whom It May Concern	B, M & R Gibb	Barry, Robin	9	16	
"Sacred Trust"	2000	This Is Where I Came In	B, M & R Gibb	Barry	—	—	
"Saw A New Morning"	1972	Life In A Tin Can	B, M & R Gibb	Barry, Robin	—	94	
"Sea Of Smiling Faces"	1972	To Whom It May Concern	B, M & R Gibb	Barry, Robin	—	—	
"Search, Find"	1978	Spirits Having Flown	B, M & R Gibb	Barry	—	—	
"Secret Love"	1990	High Civilization	B, M & R Gibb	Barry, Robin	5	—	
"Seven Seas Symphony"	1968	Odessa	B, M & R Gibb	Instrumental	—	—	
"Shape Of Things To Come"	1988	One Moment In Time	B, M & R Gibb	Barry	—	—	
"She Keeps On Coming"	2000	This Is Where I Came In	B, M & R Gibb	Robin	—	—	
"Sincere Relation"	1970	2 Years On	M & R Gibb	Robin	—	—	
"The Singer Sang His Song"	1968	Tales From The Brothers Gibb	B, M & R Gibb	Robin	—	—	B-Side of "Jumbo"
"Sinking Ships"	1967	Tales From The Brothers Gibb	B, M & R Gibb	Barry, Maurice, Robin	—	—	B-side of "Words" in 1968
"Sir Geoffrey Saved The World"	1967	Tales From The Brothers Gibb	B, M & R Gibb	Barry, Robin	—	—	B-Side of "Massachusetts" (US) or "World" (UK) in 1967
"Smoke And Mirrors"	1995	Still Waters	B, M & R Gibb	Barry, Robin	—	—	
"Soldiers"	1981	Living Eyes	B, M & R Gibb	Barry	—	—	
"Somebody Stop The Music"	1971	Trafalgar	B & M Gibb	Barry, Maurice	—	—	
"Someone Belonging To Someone"	1983	Staying Alive	B, M & R Gibb	Barry	49	49	
"Songbird"	1975	Main Course	B, M, R Gibb & Blue Weaver	Barry, Maurice, Robin	—	—	
"Sound Of Love"	1968	Odessa	B, M & R Gibb	Barry	—	—	
"South Dakota Morning"	1972	Life In A Tin Can	B Gibb	Barry	—	—	
"Spirits (Having Flown)"	1978	Spirits Having Flown	B, M & R Gibb	Barry	16	—	
"Stayin' Alive"	1977	Saturday Night Fever	B, M & R Gibb	Barry	4	1	
"Still Waters Run Deep"	1995	Still Waters	B, M & R Gibb	Barry, Robin	18	57	
"Stop (Think Again)"	1978	Spirits Having Flown	B, M & R Gibb	Barry	—	—	
"Subway"	1976	Children Of The World	B, M & R Gibb	Barry	—	—	
"Such A Shame"	1968	Idea	Vince Melouney	Maurice, Vince	—	—	The only song on a Bee Gees album not written by a Gibb brother
"Suddenly"	1968	Odessa	B, M & R Gibb	Maurice	—	—	
"Sun In My Morning"	1969	Tales From The Brothers Gibb	B & M Gibb	Barry	—	—	B-Side of "Tomorrow, Tomorrow" in 1969
"Swan Song"	1968	Idea	B, M & R Gibb	Barry	—	—	
"Sweet Song Of Summer"	1972	To Whom It May Concern	B, M & R Gibb	Barry, Maurice, Robin	—	—	
"Sweetheart"	1969	Cucumber Castle	B & M Gibb	Barry, Maurice	—	—	
"Tears"	1989	One	B, M & R Gibb	Barry	—	—	
"Technicolor Dreams"	2000	This Is Where I Came In	B Gibb	Barry	—	—	
"Tell Me Why"	1970	2 Years On	B Gibb	Barry	—	—	
"Then You Left Me"	1969	Cucumber Castle	B & M Gibb	Barry	—	—	
"This Is Where I Came In"	2000	This Is Where I Came In	B, M & R Gibb	Barry, Robin	18	—	
"This Is Your Life"	1987	E.S.P.	B, M & R Gibb	Barry	—	—	
"Throw A Penny"	1973	Mr. Natural	B & R Gibb	Barry, Robin	—	—	
"To Love Somebody"	1967	Bee Gees 1st	B & R Gibb	Barry	41	17	
"Tokyo Nights"	1988	One	B, M & R Gibb	Robin	—	—	
"Tomorrow, Tomorrow"	1969	Best Of Bee Gees	B & M Gibb	Barry	23	54	Included on CD version of Best of Bee Gees only, from 1987 on
"Too Much Heaven"	1978	Spirits Having Flown	B, M & R Gibb	Barry	3	1	
"Trafalgar"	1971	Trafalgar	M Gibb	Maurice	—	—	
"Tragedy"	1978	Spirits Having Flown	B, M & R Gibb	Barry	1	1	
"True Confessions"	1990	High Civilization	B, M & R Gibb	Barry	—	—	
"Turn Of The Century"	1967	Bee Gees 1st	B & R Gibb	Barry, Robin	—	—	
"Turning Tide"	1969	Cucumber Castle	B & M Gibb	Barry	—	—	
"Until"	1978	Spirits Having Flown	B, M & R Gibb	Barry	—	—	
"Voice In The Wilderness"	2000	This Is Where I Came In	B Gibb, Ben Stivers, Alan Kendall, Steve Rucker, Matt Bonelli	Barry	—	—	
"Voices"	1973	Mr. Natural	B, M & R Gibb	Barry, Robin	—	—	
"Walking Back To Waterloo"	1971	Trafalgar	B, M & R Gibb	Barry, Maurice, Robin	—	—	
"Walking On Air"	2000	This Is Where I Came In	M Gibb	Maurice	—	—	
"Warm Ride"	1979	Bee Gees Greatest (Expanded)	B, M & R Gibb	Barry	—	—	Rare Earth had 1979 #39 hit. Written in 1977. The Bee Gees version was released only on the expanded version of Bee Gees Greatest in 2007
"The Way It Was"	1976	Children Of The World	B, R Gibb & Blue Weaver	Barry	—	—	
"We Lost The Road"	1972	To Whom It May Concern	B & R Gibb	Barry, Robin	—	—	
"Wedding Day"	2000	This Is Where I Came In	B, M & R Gibb	Barry, Robin	—	—	
"When Do I"	1971	Trafalgar	B & R Gibb	Robin	—	—	
"When He's Gone"	1990	High Civilization	B, M & R Gibb	Barry, Robin	—	—	
"When The Swallows Fly"	1968	Idea	B, M & R Gibb	Barry	—	—	
"Where Is Your Sister"	1972	A Kick In The Head Is Worth Eight In The Pants	B, M & R Gibb	Barry	—	—	Unreleased
"While I Play"	1972	Life In A Tin Can	B Gibb	Barry	—	—	
"Whisper Whisper"	1968	Odessa	B, M & R Gibb	Barry	—	—	
"Wildflower"	1981	Living Eyes	B, M & R Gibb	Maurice	—	—	
"Will You Ever Let Me"	1989	One	B, M & R Gibb	Barry	—	—	
"Will You Love Me Tomorrow"	1995	Tapestry Revisited	Gerry Goffin & Carole King	Barry, Robin	—	—	
"Wind Of Change"	1975	Main Course	B & R Gibb	Barry, Robin	—	—	
"Wing And A Prayer"	1988	One	B, M & R Gibb	Barry	—	—	
"Wish You Were Here"	1988	One	B, M & R Gibb	Barry	—	—	
"With All Nations (International Anthem)"	1968	Odessa	B, M & R Gibb	Instrumental	—	—	
"With My Eyes Closed"	1996	Still Waters	B, M & R Gibb	Barry	—	—	
"With The Sun In My Eyes"	1967	Horizontal	B, M & R Gibb	Barry	—	—	
"The Woman In You"	1983	Staying Alive	B, M & R Gibb	Barry	81	24	
"Words"	1967	Best Of Bee Gees	B, M & R Gibb	Barry	8	15	
"World"	1967	Horizontal	B, M & R Gibb	Barry, Robin	9	—	
"Wouldn't I Be Someone"	1972	Best Of Bee Gees Vol. 2	B, M & R Gibb	Barry, Robin	—	115	Only on US vinyl version of the album. A-side in 1973.
"You Know It's For You"	1972	To Whom It May Concern	M Gibb	Maurice	—	—	
"You Should Be Dancing"	1976	Children Of The World	B, M & R Gibb	Barry	5	1	
"You Stepped Into My Life"	1976	Children Of The World	B, M & R Gibb	Barry	—	—	
"You Win Again"	1987	E.S.P.	B, M & R Gibb	Barry, Robin	1	75	
"You'll Never See My Face Again"	1968	Odessa	B, M & R Gibb	Barry	—	—	

== See also ==
- List of unreleased material recorded by the Bee Gees
