= Bee Gees discography =

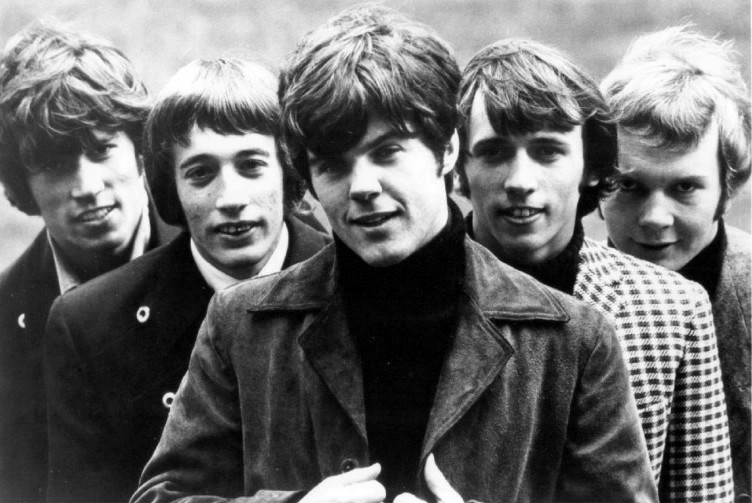
- The Bee Gees in 1967.
- Studio albums: 22
- Soundtrack albums: 4
- Live albums: 3
- Compilation albums: 22
- Singles: 87
- Video albums: 7
- Music videos: 38

The discography of the British-Australian musical group Bee Gees consists of 44 albums (including 22 studio albums), 3 live albums, 4 soundtrack albums, 87 singles, 7 video albums and 38 music videos. In a career spanning more than 50 years, the Gibb brothers sold over 120 million records worldwide (with estimates as high as over 200 million records sold worldwide), becoming among the best-selling music artists in history. Billboard ranked them as the 28th Greatest Artist[s] of All Time. According to RIAA, the Bee Gees have sold 28 million certified albums in the United States.

Saturday Night Fever is in the top five best-selling albums to date, selling over 40 million copies worldwide (16× Platinum in the US). Billboard also ranked them as the 14th Greatest Hot 100 Artist of all time. They have scored 9 No. 1 hits on the Billboard Hot 100, including 15 top ten hits and 43 chart entries overall. Spirits Having Flown has sold over 20 million copies worldwide, marking yet another huge success for the trio.

== Albums ==
=== Studio albums ===
| Title | Album details | Chart positions | | | | | | | | | | Certifications (sales thresholds) |
| Title | Album details | AUS | AUT | BEL | CAN | GER | NED | NZ | SWI | UK | US | Certifications (sales thresholds) |
|---|---|---|---|---|---|---|---|---|---|---|---|---|
| The Bee Gees Sing and Play 14 Barry Gibb Songs | Released: November 1965; Label: Leedon; Formats: LP | — | — | — | — | — | — | — | — | — | — | |
| Spicks and Specks | Released: November 1966; Label: Spin; Formats: LP | — | — | — | — | — | — | — | — | — | — | |
| Bee Gees' 1st | Released: 9 August 1967; Label: Polydor/Atco; Formats: LP | 10 | — | — | — | 4 | — | — | — | 8 | 7 | |
| Horizontal | Released: 27 January 1968; Label: Polydor/Atco; Formats: LP, 8-track | 8 | — | — | — | 1 | — | — | — | 16 | 12 | |
| Idea | Released: September 1968; Label: Polydor/Atco; Formats: LP, 8-track | 8 | — | — | 10 | 3 | — | — | — | 4 | 17 | |
| Odessa | Released: 30 March 1969; Label: Polydor/Atco; Formats: LP, Cassette, 8-track | 13 | — | — | 7 | 4 | 9 | — | — | 10 | 20 | |
| Cucumber Castle | Released: April 1970; Label: Polydor/Atco; Formats: LP, Cassette, 8-track | 10 | — | — | 37 | 36 | — | — | — | 57 | 94 | |
| 2 Years On | Released: November 1970; Label: Polydor/Atco; Formats: LP, Cassette, 8-track | 22 | — | — | 22 | — | — | — | — | — | 32 | |
| Trafalgar | Released: September 1971; Label: Polydor/Atco; Formats: LP, Cassette, 8-track | 8 | — | — | 17 | — | — | — | — | — | 34 | |
| To Whom It May Concern | Released: October 1972; Label: Polydor/Atco; Formats: LP, Cassette, 8-track | 13 | — | — | 50 | — | — | — | — | — | 35 | |
| Life in a Tin Can | Released: 19 January 1973; Label: RSO; Formats: LP, Cassette, 8-track | 19 | — | — | 54 | — | — | — | — | — | 69 | |
| Mr. Natural | Released: 13 May 1974; Label: RSO; Formats: LP, Cassette, 8-track | 20 | — | — | — | — | — | — | — | — | 178 | |
| Main Course | Released: June 1975; Label: RSO; Formats: LP, Cassette, 8-track | 29 | — | — | 1 | 29 | — | 36 | — | — | 14 | CAN: 2× Platinum; US: Gold |
| Children of the World | Released: 13 September 1976; Label: RSO; Formats: LP, Cassette, 8-track | 16 | — | — | 3 | 36 | — | 6 | — | — | 8 | CAN: Platinum; US: Platinum |
| Spirits Having Flown | Released: 5 February 1979; Label: RSO; Formats: LP, Cassette, 8-track | 1 | 2 | — | 1 | 1 | 3 | 1 | — | 1 | 1 | BPI: Platinum; CAN: 5× Platinum; US: Platinum |
| Living Eyes | Released: October 1981; Label: RSO; Formats: LP, Cassette, CD | 30 | — | — | 32 | 37 | 7 | 13 | — | 73 | 41 | CAN: Platinum |
| E·S·P | Released: 22 September 1987; Label: Warner Bros.; Formats: LP, Cassette, CD | 25 | 2 | — | 85 | 1 | 9 | 44 | 1 | 5 | 96 | BPI: Platinum; GER: 3× Gold; SWI: 2× Platinum |
| One | Released: 10 April 1989; Label: Warner Bros.; Formats: LP, CD, Cassette | 29 | 23 | — | 46 | 4 | 22 | — | 6 | 29 | 68 | AUS: Gold; GER: Gold; SWI: Gold |
| High Civilization | Released: 26 March 1991; Label: Warner Bros.; Formats: CD, Cassette, LP | 126 | 4 | — | — | 2 | 21 | — | 6 | 24 | — | AUT: Gold; GER: Platinum; SWI: Platinum |
| Size Isn't Everything | Released: 14 September 1993; Label: Polydor; Formats: CD, Cassette, LP | 117 | 6 | — | — | 12 | 28 | — | 14 | 23 | 153 | BPI: Gold |
| Still Waters | Released: 11 March 1997; Label: Polydor; Formats: CD, Cassette | 4 | 4 | 7 | 11 | 2 | 3 | 1 | 1 | 2 | 11 | AUS: 2× Platinum; AUT: Gold; BPI: Gold; CAN: Platinum; GER: Platinum; NVPI: Gold; SWI: Platinum; US: Platinum |
| This Is Where I Came In | Released: 2 April 2001; Label: Polydor; Formats: CD, Cassette | 16 | 6 | 18 | 10 | 3 | 15 | 4 | 5 | 6 | 16 | AUS: Gold; BPI: Gold; CAN: Gold; GER: Gold; SWI: Gold |
"—" denotes a recording that did not chart or was not released in that territory.

=== Compilation albums ===
| Title | Album details | Chart positions | | | | | | | | | | Certifications (sales thresholds) |
| Title | Album details | AUS | AUT | BEL | CAN | GER | NED | NZ | SWI | UK | US | Certifications (sales thresholds) |
|---|---|---|---|---|---|---|---|---|---|---|---|---|
| Turn Around, Look at Us | Released: 1967; Label: Festival | — | — | — | — | — | — | — | — | — | — | |
| Best of Bee Gees | Released: June 1969; Label: Polydor/Atco | 5 | — | — | 5 | 26 | 11 | — | — | 7 | 9 | CAN: 2× Platinum; US: Gold |
| Inception/Nostalgia | Released: January 1970; Label: Karussell | — | — | — | — | — | — | — | — | — | — | |
| Best of Bee Gees Vol. 2 | Released: August 1973; Label: Polydor | 17 | — | — | — | — | 58 | — | — | — | 98 | CAN: Platinum |
| Bee Gees Gold | Released: November 1976; Label: RSO | — | — | — | — | — | — | — | — | — | 50 | CAN: Gold; US: Gold |
| Peace Of Mind | Released: 1978; Label: Pickwick | — | — | — | – | — | — | — | — | — | — | |
| 20 Greatest Hits | Released: 1978; Label: RSO | — | 7 | — | — | 4 | — | — | — | — | — | |
| Greatest | Released: October 1979; Label: RSO | 1 | 4 | 65 | 4 | 43 | 35 | 2 | 60 | 6 | 1 | BPI: Platinum; CAN: 2× Platinum; NZ: Platinum; US: 2× Platinum |
| Gold & Diamonds | Released: 1983; Label: Polystar | — | — | — | — | 4 | — | — | — | — | — | |
| 1988 Summer Olympics Album: One Moment in Time (with various artists) | Released: 30 August 1988; Label: Arista | — | — | — | — | — | — | — | — | — | 31 | US: Gold |
| Bee Gees Story | Released: 1989; Label: Polydor | 106 | — | — | — | — | — | — | — | — | — | |
| Tales from the Brothers Gibb | Released: 13 November 1990; Label: Polydor; 4-CD box set | — | — | — | — | — | — | — | — | — | — | |
| The Very Best of the Bee Gees | Released: 20 November 1990; Label: Polydor | 7 | 9 | 19 | 42 | 9 | 8 | 5 | — | 6 | — | AUS: Gold; AUT: Gold; BPI: 3× Platinum; GER: 2× Platinum; NZ: Platinum; NVPI: Gold; SWI: Platinum |
| Their Greatest Hits: The Record | Released: 20 November 2001; Label: Polydor | 2 | 14 | 13 | — | 10 | 2 | 1 | 11 | 5 | 49 | AUS: 3× Platinum; BEL: Gold; BPI: 3× Platinum; BRA: 2× Platinum; GER: Gold; NVPI: Gold; NZ: 7× Platinum; SWI: Gold; US: Platinum |
| Number Ones | Released: November 2004; Label: Universal | 17 | 32 | 29 | — | 43 | 32 | 10 | 22 | 4 | 5 | AUS: Platinum; BPI: Platinum; NZ: Platinum; US: Gold |
| Love Songs | Released: 6 December 2005; Label: Universal | 84 | — | — | — | — | 21 | — | — | 51 | 166 | BPI: Silver |
| The Studio Albums 1967–1968 | Released: 2006; Label: Reprise | — | — | — | — | — | — | — | — | — | — | |
| The Ultimate Bee Gees | Released: November 2009; Label: Reprise | 7 | 25 | — | — | 32 | 83 | 10 | 38 | 19 | 49 | BEL: Gold; BPI: Gold; US: Gold |
| Opus Collection | Released: 2010; Label: Starbucks | — | — | — | — | — | — | — | — | — | 41 | |
| Mythology | Released: 15 November 2010; Label: Reprise; 4-CD box set (each disc representing an individual Gibb brother) | 3 | 33 | — | — | 9 | 100 | 9 | 31 | 29 | — | AUS: 2× Platinum; BPI: Gold; NZ: Gold |
| The Warner Bros Years 1987–1991 | Released: April 2014; Label: Rhino; 5-CD box set | — | — | — | — | 74 | 48 | 45 | — | 92 | — | |
| 1974–1979 | Released: 2015; Label: Rhino; 5-CD box set | — | — | — | — | — | — | — | — | — | — | |
| Timeless: The All-Time Greatest Hits | Released: 21 April 2017; Label: Capitol | 30 | — | 43 | 87 | 73 | — | — | 32 | 6 | 41 | BPI: 2× Platinum |
| You Should Be Dancing: The 12″ Collection | Released: 2026; Label: UMe | — | — | — | — | — | — | — | — | — | — | |
"—" denotes a recording that did not chart or was not released in that territory.

=== Live albums ===
| Title | Album details | Chart positions | | | | | | | | | | | Certifications (sales thresholds) |
| Title | Album details | AUS | AUT | BEL | CAN | GER | NED | NZ | SWE | SWI | UK | US | Certifications (sales thresholds) |
|---|---|---|---|---|---|---|---|---|---|---|---|---|---|
| Here at Last... Bee Gees... Live | Released: May 1977; Label: RSO | 8 | — | — | 5 | 44 | 45 | 1 | — | — | — | 8 | BPI: Gold; CAN: Gold; US: Platinum |
| One Night Only | Released: September 1998; Label: Polydor | 1 | 1 | 14 | 62 | 5 | 1 | 1 | 18 | 2 | 4 | 72 | AUS: 4× Platinum; AUT: Platinum; BPI: 3× Platinum; BRA: Gold; CAN: Platinum; GER: Gold; NZ: 8× Platinum; NVPI: Gold; SWE: Gold; SWI: Platinum; US: Platinum |
| Live on Air 1967-1968 | Released: December 2019; Label: London Calling | — | — | — | — | — | — | — | — | — | — | — | — |
"—" denotes a recording that did not chart or was not released in that territory.

=== Soundtracks ===
| Title | Album details | Chart positions | | | | | | | | | | | Certifications (sales thresholds) |
| Title | Album details | AUS | AUT | BEL | CAN | GER | NED | NZ | SWE | SWI | UK | US | Certifications (sales thresholds) |
|---|---|---|---|---|---|---|---|---|---|---|---|---|---|
| Melody (with various artists) | Released: May 1971; Label: Polydor/Atco | — | — | — | — | — | — | — | — | — | — | — | |
| Saturday Night Fever (with various artists) | Released: 15 November 1977; Label: RSO | 1 | 1 | — | 1 | 1 | 1 | 1 | 1 | — | 1 | 1 | AUS: 11× Platinum; BPI: 7× Platinum; CAN: Diamond; GER: 3× Platinum; NVPI: Platinum; US: Diamond (16× Platinum) |
| Sgt. Pepper's Lonely Hearts Club Band (with various artists) | Released: July 1978; Label: RSO | 13 | — | — | — | 29 | 14 | 2 | 34 | — | 38 | 5 | BPI: Silver |
| Staying Alive (with various artists) | Released: June 1983; Label: RSO | 25 | 9 | — | — | 8 | 17 | — | 16 | 1 | 14 | 6 | BPI: Silver; US: Platinum |
"—" denotes a recording that did not chart or was not released in that territory.

== Singles ==
=== 1960s ===
| Year | Single | Chart positions | | | | | | | | | | Certifications | UK album | US album |
| Year | Single | AUS | AUT | BEL | CAN | GER | IRE | NED | SWI | UK | US | Certifications | UK album | US album |
|---|---|---|---|---|---|---|---|---|---|---|---|---|---|---|
| 1963 | A: "The Battle of the Blue and the Grey"; B: "The Three Kisses of Love" | 98 | — | — | — | — | — | — | — | — | — | | Non-album tracks | A: Turn Around, Look at Me; B: Take Hold of That Star, Rare, Precious & Beautiful Volume 2 |
| 1963 | A: "Timber!"; B: "Take Hold of That Star" | 75 | — | — | — | — | — | — | — | — | — | | The Bee Gees Sing and Play 14 Barry Gibb Songs | A: Peace of Mind; B:Take Hold of That Star, Rare, Precious & Beautiful Volume 2 |
| 1964 | A: "Peace of Mind"; B: "Don't Say Goodbye" | — | — | — | — | — | — | — | — | — | — | | The Bee Gees Sing and Play 14 Barry Gibb Songs | A: Peace of Mind; B: Peace of Mind, Rare, Precious & Beautiful Volume 2 |
| 1964 | A: "Claustrophobia"; B: "Could It Be" | — | — | — | — | — | — | — | — | — | — | | The Bee Gees Sing and Play 14 Barry Gibb Songs | A: Take Hold of That Star, Rare, Precious & Beautiful Volume 2 B: Take Hold of That Star |
| 1964 | A: "Turn Around, Look at Me"; B: "(Theme from) The Travels of Jamie McPheeters" | 94 | — | — | — | — | — | — | — | — | — | | Non-album tracks | A: Turn Around, Look at Me; B: Take Hold of That Star, Rare, Precious & Beautiful Volume 2 |
| 1965 | "House Without Windows" b/w "And I'll Be Happy" (with Trevor Gordon; credited as "Trevor Gordon and the Bee Gees") | — | — | — | — | — | — | — | — | — | — | | Non-album tracks | N/A in UK or US; released on Assault the Vault (Festival Records compilation, Australia) |
| 1965 | A: "Everyday I Have to Cry"; B: "You Wouldn't Know" (credited as "Barry Gibb and the Bee Gees") | — | — | — | — | — | — | — | — | — | — | | Non-album tracks | A: Take Hold of That Star, Rare, Precious & Beautiful Volume 2 B: Turn Around, Look at Me |
| 1965 | A: "Wine and Women"; B: "Follow the Wind" | 47 | — | — | — | — | — | — | — | — | — | | The Bee Gees Sing and Play 14 Barry Gibb Songs | A: Turn Around, Look at Me; B: Take Hold of That Star, Rare, Precious & Beautiful Volume 2 |
| 1965 | A: "I Was a Lover, a Leader of Men"; B: "And the Children Laughing" | 85 | — | — | — | — | — | — | — | — | — | | The Bee Gees Sing and Play 14 Barry Gibb Songs | A: Peace of Mind, Rare, Precious & Beautiful Volume 2 B: Turn Around, Look at Me |
| 1966 | A: "Cherry Red"; B: "I Want Home" | — | — | — | — | — | — | — | — | — | — | | Non-album tracks | A: Turn Around, Look at Me; B: Peace of Mind, Rare, Precious & Beautiful Volume 2 |
| 1966 | A: "Monday's Rain"; B: "All of My Life" | — | — | — | — | — | — | — | — | — | — | | Spicks and Specks | A: Monday's Rain, Rare, Precious & Beautiful; B: Peace of Mind, Rare, Precious & Beautiful Volume 2 |
| 1966 | A: "Spicks and Specks"; B: "I Am the World" | 5 | — | — | — | 28 | — | 2 | — | — | — | | Spicks and Specks | A: Monday's Rain, Rare, Precious and Beautiful; B: Turn Around, Look at Me |
| 1967 | A: "Born a Man"; B: "Big Chance" | 86 | — | — | — | — | — | — | — | — | — | | Spicks and Specks | A: Peace of Mind, Rare, Precious & Beautiful; B: Monday's Rain |
| 1967 | A: "New York Mining Disaster 1941"; B: "I Can't See Nobody" | 11 | — | — | 13 | 10 | — | 4 | — | 12 | 14 | | Bee Gees' 1st | |
| 1967 | A: "To Love Somebody"; B: "Close Another Door" | 6 | — | 8 | 5 | 19 | — | 13 | — | 41 | 17 | BPI: Silver; NZ: Platinum | Bee Gees' 1st | |
| 1967 | A: "Holiday"; B: "Every Christian Lion Hearted Man Will Show You" | — | — | — | 3 | — | — | 3 | — | — | 16 | | Bee Gees' 1st | |
| 1967 | A: "Massachusetts"; B: "Barker of the UFO" | 2 | 1 | 1 | 3 | 1 | 2 | 1 | 2 | 1 | 11 | BPI: Silver; NZ: Gold | A: Horizontal; B: Non-album tracks | |
| 1967 | A: "World"; B: "Sir Geoffrey Saved the World" | 6 | 5 | 7 | — | 1 | 18 | 1 | 2 | 9 | — | | A: Horizontal; B: Non-album tracks | |
| 1968 | A: "Words"; B: "Sinking Ships" | 13 | 4 | 3 | 1 | 1 | 14 | 1 | 1 | 8 | 15 | | A: Best of Bee Gees; B: Non-album track | |
| 1968 | A: "Jumbo"; A: "The Singer Sang His Song" | 20 | 9 | 18 | 16 | 5 | — | 2 | — | 25 | 57 | | Non-album tracks | |
| 1968 | A: "I've Gotta Get a Message to You"; B: "Kitty Can" | 3 | 12 | 6 | 3 | 3 | 1 | 3 | 6 | 1 | 8 | | Idea | |
| 1968 | A: "I Started a Joke"; B: "Kilburn Towers" | 1 | 16 | 19 | 1 | — | — | 3 | 5 | — | 6 | BPI: Silver | Idea | |
| 1969 | A: "First of May"; B: "Lamplight" | 15 | 10 | 7 | 14 | 3 | 4 | 2 | 4 | 6 | 37 | | Odessa | |
| 1969 | A: "Tomorrow Tomorrow"; B: "Sun in My Morning" | 28 | 7 | 8 | 19 | 6 | — | 3 | 6 | 23 | 54 | | Non-album tracks | |
| 1969 | A: "Don't Forget to Remember"; B: "The Lord" | 10 | 8 | 3 | 39 | 9 | 1 | 1 | 2 | 2 | 73 | | Cucumber Castle | |
"—" denotes releases that did not chart or were not released.

=== 1970s ===
| Year | Single | Chart positions | | | | | | | | | | | Certifications | Album |
| Year | Single | AUS | AUT | BEL | CAN | GER | IRE | NED | SWI | UK | US | US AC | Certifications | Album |
|---|---|---|---|---|---|---|---|---|---|---|---|---|---|---|
| 1970 | A: "Let There Be Love"; B: "Really and Sincerely" | — | — | — | — | — | — | 16 | — | — | — | — | | Idea |
| 1970 | A: "If Only I Had My Mind on Something Else"; B: "Sweetheart" | — | — | — | 52 | — | — | — | — | — | 91 | — | | Cucumber Castle |
| 1970 | A: "I.O.I.O."; B: "Sweetheart" | 14 | 2 | 14 | 63 | 6 | — | 9 | — | 49 | 94 | — | | Cucumber Castle |
| 1970 | A: "Lonely Days"; B: "Man for All Seasons" | 9 | 15 | 8 | 1 | 25 | — | 3 | — | 33 | 3 | 28 | US: Gold | 2 Years On |
| 1971 | A: "Melody Fair"; B: "In the Morning" | — | — | — | — | — | — | — | — | — | — | — | | A: Odessa, Melody soundtrack B: Melody soundtrack |
| 1971 | A: "How Can You Mend a Broken Heart"; B: "Country Woman" | 3 | — | 21 | 1 | — | — | 16 | — | — | 1 | 4 | US: Gold | A: Trafalgar B: Non-album track |
| 1971 | A: "When the Swallows Fly"; B: "Give Your Best" | — | — | — | — | — | — | 20 | — | — | — | — | | Idea and Melody soundtrack |
| 1971 | A: "In the Morning"; B: "To Love Somebody" | — | — | — | — | — | — | — | — | — | — | — | | Melody soundtrack |
| 1971 | A: "Don't Wanna Live Inside Myself"; B: "Walking Back to Waterloo" | — | — | — | 34 | — | — | 29 | — | — | 53 | — | | Trafalgar |
| 1972 | A: "My World"; B: "On Time" | 3 | — | 15 | 11 | 41 | 14 | 8 | — | 16 | 16 | 19 | | Non-album single |
| 1972 | A: "Israel"; B: "Dearest" | — | — | — | — | — | — | 22 | — | — | — | — | | Trafalgar |
| 1972 | A: "Run to Me"; B: "Road to Alaska" | 3 | — | — | 6 | — | 7 | 27 | — | 9 | 16 | 6 | | To Whom It May Concern |
| 1972 | A: "Sea of Smiling Faces"; B: "Please Don't Turn Out the Lights" | — | — | — | — | — | — | — | — | — | — | — | | To Whom It May Concern |
| 1972 | A: "Alive"; B: "Paper Mache, Cabbages and Kings" | 45 | — | — | 28 | — | — | 15 | — | — | 34 | 20 | | To Whom It May Concern |
| 1973 | A: "Saw a New Morning"; B: "My Life Has Been a Song" | 38 | — | — | — | — | — | — | — | — | 94 | — | | Life in a Tin Can |
| 1973 | A: "Wouldn't I Be Someone"; B: "Elisa" | 52 | — | — | — | — | — | — | — | — | — | 42 | | A Kick in the Head Is Worth Eight in the Pants |
| 1974 | A: "Mr. Natural"; B: "It Doesn't Matter Much to Me" | 11 | — | — | 90 | — | — | — | — | — | 93 | — | | A: Mr. Natural B: Non-album track |
| 1974 | A: "Throw a Penny"; B: "I Can't Let You Go" | — | — | — | 91 | — | — | — | — | — | — | — | | Mr. Natural |
| 1974 | A: "Charade"; B: "Heavy Breathing" | — | — | — | — | — | — | — | — | — | — | 31 | | Mr. Natural |
| 1975 | A: "Jive Talkin'"; B: "Wind of Change" | 14 | — | 24 | 1 | 23 | 5 | 23 | — | 5 | 1 | 9 | BPI: Silver; CAN: Gold; NZ: Gold; US: Gold | Main Course |
| 1975 | A: "Nights on Broadway"; B: "Edge of the Universe" | 67 | — | 15 | 2 | 17 | — | 8 | — | 55 (Note: Chart position is from the official UK "Breakers List".) | 7 | 16 | CAN: Gold | Main Course |
| 1975 | A: "Fanny (Be Tender with My Love)"; B: "Country Lanes" | 61 | — | 29 | 2 | 42 | — | — | — | — | 12 | 9 | | Main Course |
| 1976 | A: "You Should Be Dancing"; B: "Subway" | 20 | — | 20 | 1 | 16 | 4 | 17 | — | 5 | 1 | 25 | BPI: Gold; CAN: Gold; NZ: Platinum; US: Gold | Children of the World |
| 1976 | A: "Love So Right"; B: "You Stepped Into My Life" | 28 | — | — | 2 | 38 | 14 | — | — | 41 | 3 | 14 | CAN: Gold; US: Gold | Children of the World |
| 1977 | A: "Boogie Child"; B: "Lovers" | — | — | — | 9 | — | — | — | — | — | 12 | — | | Children of the World |
| 1977 | A: "Children of the World"; B: "Boogie Child" | 84 | — | — | — | — | — | — | — | — | — | — | | Children of the World |
| 1977 | A: "Edge of the Universe" (Live); B: "Words" (Live) | — | — | — | 16 | — | — | — | — | — | 26 | 43 | | Here at Last... Bee Gees... Live |
| 1977 | A: "How Deep Is Your Love"; B: "Can't Keep a Good Man Down" | 3 | 13 | 12 | 1 | 21 | 2 | 15 | — | 3 | 1 | 1 | BPI: Platinum; CAN: Gold; NZ: 3× Platinum; US: Gold | Saturday Night Fever soundtrack |
| 1977 | A: "More Than a Woman"; B: "Children of the World" | 31 | — | — | — | — | — | — | — | — | — | 39 | BPI: Platinum; NZ: 3× Platinum | Saturday Night Fever soundtrack |
| 1977 | A: "Stayin' Alive"; B: "If I Can't Have You" | 1 | 2 | 2 | 1 | 2 | 4 | 1 | 2 | 4 | 1 | 28 | BPI: 3× Platinum; CAN: Platinum; NZ: 5× Platinum; US: Platinum | Saturday Night Fever soundtrack |
| 1978 | A: "Night Fever"; B: "Down the Road" (Live) | 7 | 4 | 3 | 1 | 2 | 1 | 3 | 3 | 1 | 1 | 19 | BPI: Platinum; CAN: Platinum; NZ: 2× Platinum; US: Platinum | Saturday Night Fever soundtrack |
| 1978 | A: "Sgt. Pepper's Lonely Hearts Club Band/With a Little Help from My Friends"; B: "Nowhere Man/Sgt. Pepper's Lonely Hearts Club Band (Reprise)" | — | — | — | — | — | — | — | — | — | — | — | | Sgt. Pepper's Lonely Hearts Club Band soundtrack |
| 1978 | A: "Too Much Heaven"; B: "Rest Your Love on Me" | 5 | 13 | 8 | 1 | 10 | 2 | 14 | 5 | 3 | 1 | 4 | BPI: Gold; CAN: Platinum; US: Platinum | Spirits Having Flown |
| 1979 | A: "Tragedy"; B: "Until" | 2 | 2 | 3 | 1 | 2 | 1 | 4 | 2 | 1 | 1 | 19 | BPI: Gold; CAN: Platinum; US: Platinum | Spirits Having Flown |
| 1979 | A: "Love You Inside Out"; B: "I'm Satisfied" | 77 | — | 23 | 1 | 21 | 6 | 35 | — | 13 | 1 | 15 | CAN: Gold; US: Gold | Spirits Having Flown |
| 1979 | A: "Spirits (Having Flown)"; B: "Wind of Change" | — | — | — | — | — | 14 | 35 | — | 16 | — | — | | Bee Gees Greatest |
"—" denotes releases that did not chart or were not released.

=== 1980s ===
| Year | Single | Chart positions | | | | | | | | | | | | Certifications | Album |
| Year | Single | AUS | AUT | BEL | CAN | GER | IRE | NED | NZ | SWI | UK | US | US AC | Certifications | Album |
|---|---|---|---|---|---|---|---|---|---|---|---|---|---|---|---|
| 1981 | A: "He's a Liar"; B: "He's a Liar" (Instrumental) | 38 | — | 15 | 33 | 68 | — | 12 | — | — | 82 | 30 | — | | Living Eyes |
| 1981 | A: "Living Eyes"; B: "I Still Love You" | — | 7 | 37 | — | 58 | — | — | — | — | — | 45 | — | | Living Eyes |
| 1983 | A: "The Woman in You"; B: "Stayin' Alive" | 73 | — | 16 | — | 23 | — | 21 | — | — | 81 | 24 | — | | Staying Alive soundtrack |
| 1983 | A: "Someone Belonging to Someone"; B: "I Love You Too Much" (Instrumental) | — | — | 19 | — | 55 | — | — | — | 24 | 49 | 49 | — | | Staying Alive soundtrack |
| 1987 | A: "You Win Again"; B: "Backtafunk" | 10 | 1 | 2 | — | 1 | 1 | 5 | 18 | 1 | 1 | 75 | 50 | BPI: Gold; GER: Platinum; NZ: Gold | E.S.P. |
| 1987 | A: "E.S.P"; B: "Overnight" | 89 | — | 13 | — | 13 | 21 | 32 | — | 9 | 51 | — | — | | E.S.P. |
| 1988 | A: "Crazy for Your Love"; B: "You Win Again" (Remix) | — | — | — | — | — | — | — | — | — | 79 | — | — | | E.S.P. |
| 1988 | A: "Angela"; B: "You Win Again" (Remix) | — | — | — | — | 52 | — | — | — | — | — | — | | | E.S.P. |
| 1989 | A: "Ordinary Lives"; B: "Wing and a Prayer" | 131 | 19 | 22 | — | 8 | — | 23 | — | 9 | 54 | — | — | | One |
| 1989 | A: "One"; B: "Flesh and Blood" | 101 | — | 38 | 11 | 37 | — | 46 | — | — | 71 | 7 | 1 | US: Gold | One |
"—" denotes releases that did not chart or were not released.

=== 1990s–2000s ===
| Year | Single | Chart positions | | | | | | | | | | | | Certifications | Album |
| Year | Single | AUS | AUT | BEL | CAN | GER | IRE | NED | NZ | SWI | UK | US | US AC | Certifications | Album |
|---|---|---|---|---|---|---|---|---|---|---|---|---|---|---|---|
| 1990 | A: "Bodyguard"; B: "Will You Ever Let Me" | — | — | — | 48 | — | — | — | — | — | — | — | 9 | | One |
| 1991 | A: "Secret Love"; B: "Party with No Name" | 158 | 2 | 8 | — | 2 | 8 | 14 | — | 19 | 5 | — | — | | High Civilization |
| 1991 | A: "When He's Gone"; B: "True Confessions" | — | — | — | 93 | — | — | — | — | — | 98 | — | — | | High Civilization |
| 1991 | A: "The Only Love"; B: "You Win Again" (Live) | — | 27 | — | — | 31 | — | — | — | — | 88 | — | — | | High Civilization |
| 1991 | A: "Happy Ever After"; B: "Evolution" | — | — | — | 90 | — | — | — | — | — | — | — | — | | High Civilization |
| 1993 | A: "Paying the Price of Love"; B: "My Destiny" | — | 24 | 5 | 53 | 36 | — | 19 | — | 22 | 23 | 74 | 35 | | Size Isn't Everything |
| 1993 | A: "For Whom the Bell Tolls"; B: "Decadance (You Should Be Dancing)" | — | — | 13 | 30 | 52 | 6 | 20 | — | — | 4 | — | 29 | BPI: Silver | Size Isn't Everything |
| 1994 | A: "How to Fall in Love, Part 1"; B: "Fallen Angel" | — | — | — | — | — | — | — | — | — | 30 | — | — | | Size Isn't Everything |
| 1994 | A: "Kiss of Life"; B: "855-7019" | — | — | — | — | 51 | — | 43 | — | — | — | — | — | | Size Isn't Everything |
| 1995 | A: "Will You Love Me Tomorrow" | — | — | — | — | — | — | — | — | — | — | — | — | | Tapestry Revisited: A Tribute to Carole King |
| 1997 | A: "Alone"; B: "Rings Around the Moon" | 7 | 4 | 6 | 20 | 6 | 5 | 28 | 2 | 8 | 5 | 28 | 8 | AUS: Platinum; BPI: Silver; GER: Gold | Still Waters |
| 1997 | A: "I Could Not Love You More"; B: "Love Never Dies" | — | — | — | — | 88 | — | — | — | — | 14 | — | — | | Still Waters |
| 1997 | A: "Still Waters (Run Deep)"; B: "Love Never Dies" | 99 | — | — | 70 | 79 | — | 91 | — | — | 18 | 57 | 29 | | Still Waters |
| 1998 | A: "Immortality" (Celine Dion with the Bee Gees); B: "My Heart Will Go On" | 38 | 2 | 15 | 28 | 2 | 11 | 41 | — | 8 | 5 | — | — | BPI: Gold; GER: Platinum; NZ: Gold | Let's Talk About Love (Celine Dion album) |
| 2001 | A: "This Is Where I Came In"; B: "Just in Case/I Will Be There" | 76 | 42 | 57 | 53 | 25 | — | 56 | 37 | 41 | 18 | — | 23 | | This Is Where I Came In |
| 2007 | A: "If I Can't Have You (The Disco Boys Remix)" | — | — | — | — | 71 | — | — | — | — | — | — | — | | Non-album track |
"—" denotes releases that did not chart or were not released.

== Videography ==
=== Video albums ===
| Title | Details | Certification |
|---|---|---|
| A Virgin Video Music Biography: The Bee Gees 1967-1978 | Released: 1985; Label: Virgin Music Video | |
| One for All Tour Live! | Released: 1991; Label: MPI Home Entertainment | |
| Keppel Road: The Life and Music of the Bee Gees | Released: 1997; Label: Polygram Video | |
| One Night Only | Released: 1998; Label: Eagle Vision | ARIA: 10× Platinum; BPI: Platinum; CAN: Platinum; NZ: 6× Platinum; US: 5× Platinum |
| This Is Where I Came In: The Official Story of the Bee Gees | Released: 2001; Label: Eagle Vision | ARIA: Gold |
| Live by Request | Released: 2001; Label: Image Entertainment | ARIA: 3× Platinum |
| In Our Own Time | Released: 2010; Label: Eagle Vision | |

=== Music videos ===
| Year | Title | Album |
|---|---|---|
| 1966 | "Spicks and Specks" | Spicks and Specks |
| 1967 | "New York Mining Disaster 1941" | Bee Gees' 1st |
| 1967 | "To Love Somebody" | Bee Gees' 1st |
| 1967 | "Holiday" | Bee Gees' 1st |
| 1968 | "World" | Horizontal |
| 1969 | "Tomorrow Tomorrow" | non-album |
| 1970 | "Lonely Days" | 2 Years On |
| 1971 | "How Can You Mend a Broken Heart" | Trafalgar |
| 1972 | "My World" | non-album |
| 1972 | "Run to Me" | To Whom It May Concern |
| 1975 | "Jive Talkin'" | Main Course |
| 1975 | "Fanny (Be Tender with My Love)" | Main Course |
| 1977 | "How Deep Is Your Love" | Saturday Night Fever |
| 1977 | "Stayin' Alive" | Saturday Night Fever |
| 1978 | "Night Fever" | Saturday Night Fever |
| 1978 | "Too Much Heaven" | Spirits Having Flown |
| 1978 | "Spirits (Having Flown)" | Spirits Having Flown |
| 1981 | "He's a Liar" | Living Eyes |
| 1981 | "Living Eyes" | Living Eyes |
| 1983 | "The Woman in You" | Staying Alive |
| 1987 | "You Win Again" | E.S.P. |
| 1987 | "E.S.P." | E.S.P. |
| 1988 | "Angela" | E.S.P. |
| 1989 | "Ordinary Lives" | One |
| 1989 | "One" | One |
| 1990 | "Bodyguard" | One |
| 1991 | "Secret Love" | High Civilization |
| 1991 | "When He's Gone" | High Civilization |
| 1993 | "Paying the Price of Love" | Size Isn't Everything |
| 1993 | "Omega Man" | Size Isn't Everything |
| 1993 | "For Whom the Bell Tolls" | Size Isn't Everything |
| 1994 | "How to Fall in Love, Part 1" | Size Isn't Everything |
| 1994 | "Kiss of Life" | Size Isn't Everything |
| 1997 | "Alone" | Still Waters |
| 1997 | "I Could Not Love You More" | Still Waters |
| 1997 | "Still Waters (Run Deep)" | Still Waters |
| 1998 | "Immortality" (Celine Dion with the Bee Gees) | Let's Talk About Love (Celine Dion album) |
| 2001 | "This Is Where I Came In" | This Is Where I Came In |
