= Tales from the Brothers Gibb =

Tales from the Brothers Gibb: A History in Song

Box set by the Bee Gees
- Released: 13 November 1990
- Recorded: 1967–1990
- Length: 271:30
- Label: Polydor, Warner Bros., Warner Music
- Compiler: Bill Levenson

Bee Gees compilations chronology
One (1989)	Tales from the Brothers Gibb: A History in Song (1990)	The Very Best of the Bee Gees (1990)

Professional ratings
Review scores
Source	Rating
AllMusic	4.5/5 stars
New Musical Express	8/10
The Rolling Stone Album Guide	3.5/5 stars

Tales from the Brothers Gibb: A History in Song is a box set compilation released by the Bee Gees in 1990. Originally released on four cassettes and four compact discs, Tales is a summary of the Bee Gees output from their third album, 1967's Bee Gees 1st to the group's most recent album (at the time), 1989's One.

Considering the peculiar nature of the Gibbs' catalogue, the compilers neatly arranged each disc/cassette to represent the Bee Gees at different periods of their career called Chapters. Chapter I consists of songs from their folky/psychedelic era of 1967–1970; Chapter II covers the ballad-heavy period of 1971–1974; Chapter III tracks the disco era from 1975 to 1979 and Chapter IV consists of the Gibbs' output in the '80s, including material from their two Warner Bros. albums.

== Release ==
Many B-sides made their CD debut on Tales as well as solo material, unreleased tracks and live performances not available anywhere else. Album cuts, with a few exceptions, were not included here as to keep the focus on single releases.

Several tracks received new stereo mixes prepared by Bill Inglot especially for this set. "World", "I've Gotta Get a Message to You" and "Words" are notable for the improved stereo mixes found on Tales. "Tomorrow Tomorrow" received its first stereo mix (the Best of Bee Gees 1986 CD featured the song in mono while the original 1969 Best of Bee Gees LP did not include the track), while many of the B-sides such as "Sinking Ships", "Barker of the UFO" and "The Singer Sang His Song" were mixed in stereo for the first time.

The four live songs that ended the collection were taken from their highly successful "All for One" concert in Australia. That concert became available on CD in its entirety in 2014.

The packaging includes symbols for each song, photos taken in 1989 at a video shoot, and comments from one of the brothers on each song in the accompanying book. No historic photos were used.

== Track listing ==
Chapter I: 1967–1970
No.	Title	Writer(s)	Length
1.	"New York Mining Disaster 1941" (A-side single, 1967; from Bee Gees' 1st, 1967)	Barry Gibb, Robin Gibb	2:08
2.	"I Can't See Nobody" (from Bee Gees' 1st, 1967)	B. Gibb, R. Gibb	3:43
3.	"To Love Somebody" (A-side single, 1967; from Bee Gees' 1st, 1967)	B. Gibb, R. Gibb	2:59
4.	"Holiday" (A-side single, 1967; from Bee Gees' 1st, 1967)	B. Gibb, R. Gibb	2:52
5.	"Massachusetts" (A-side single, 1967; from Horizontal, 1968)	B. Gibb, R. Gibb, M. Gibb	2:22
6.	"Barker of the UFO" (B-side of the "Massachusetts" single, 1967)	B. Gibb	1:51
7.	"World" (A-side single, 1967; from Horizontal, 1968)	B. Gibb, R. Gibb, M. Gibb	3:14
8.	"Sir Geoffrey Saved the World" (B-side of the "World" single, 1967)	B. Gibb, R. Gibb, M. Gibb	2:15
9.	"And the Sun Will Shine" (from Horizontal, 1968)	B. Gibb, R. Gibb, M. Gibb	3:29
10.	"Words" (A-side single, 1968; from Best of Bee Gees, 1969)	B. Gibb, R. Gibb, M. Gibb	3:14
11.	"Sinking Ships" (B-side of the "Words" single, 1968)	B. Gibb, R. Gibb, M. Gibb	2:21
12.	"Jumbo" (A-side single, 1968)	B. Gibb, R. Gibb, M. Gibb	2:08
13.	"The Singer Sang His Song" (B-side of the "Jumbo" single, 1968)	B. Gibb, R. Gibb, M. Gibb	3:19
14.	"I've Gotta Get a Message to You" (A-side single, 1968; from Idea, 1968)	B. Gibb, R. Gibb, M. Gibb	3:06
15.	"I Started a Joke" (A-side single, 1969; from Idea, 1968)	B. Gibb, R. Gibb, M. Gibb	3:06
16.	"First of May" (A-side single, 1969; from Odessa, 1969)	B. Gibb, R. Gibb, M. Gibb	2:47
17.	"Melody Fair" (from Odessa, 1969)	B. Gibb, R. Gibb, M. Gibb	3:47
18.	"Tomorrow Tomorrow" (A-side single, 1969)	B. Gibb, M. Gibb	4:06
19.	"Sun in My Morning" (B-side of the "Tomorrow Tomorrow" single, 1969)	B. Gibb, M. Gibb	2:47
20.	"Saved by the Bell" (Robin Gibb solo track) (A-side single, 1969; from Robin's Reign, 1970)	R. Gibb	3:03
21.	"Don't Forget to Remember" (A-side single, 1969; from Cucumber Castle, 1970)	B. Gibb, M. Gibb	3:27
22.	"If Only I Had My Mind on Something Else" (A-side single, 1970; from Cucumber Castle, 1970)	B. Gibb, M. Gibb	2:32
23.	"I.O.I.O." (A-side single, 1970; from Cucumber Castle, 1970)	B. Gibb, M. Gibb	2:50
24.	"Railroad" (Maurice Gibb) (A-side single, 1970)	M. Gibb, Billy Lawrie	3:38
25.	"I'll Kiss Your Memory" (Barry Gibb solo track) (A-side single, 1970)	B. Gibb	4:26

Chapter II: 1971–1974
No.	Title	Writer(s)	Length
1.	"Lonely Days" (A-side single, 1970; from 2 Years On, 1971)	B. Gibb, R. Gibb, M. Gibb	3:44
2.	"Morning of My Life (In the Morning)" (from the Melody soundtrack, 1971)	B. Gibb	3:52
3.	"How Can You Mend a Broken Heart" (A-side single, 1971; from Trafalgar, 1971)	B. Gibb, R. Gibb	3:56
4.	"Country Woman" (B-side of the "How Can You Mend a Broken Heart" single, 1971)	M. Gibb	2:39
5.	"Don't Wanna Live Inside Myself" (A-side single, 1971; from Trafalgar, 1971)	B. Gibb	5:24
6.	"My World" (A-side single, 1972; from Best of Bee Gees, Volume 2, 1973)	B. Gibb, R. Gibb	4:18
7.	"On Time" (B-side of the "My World" single, 1972)	M. Gibb	3:00
8.	"Run to Me" (A-side single, 1972; from To Whom It May Concern, 1972)	B. Gibb, R. Gibb, M. Gibb	3:04
9.	"Alive" (A-side single, 1972; from To Whom It May Concern, 1972)	B. Gibb, M. Gibb	4:01
10.	"Saw a New Morning" (A-side single, 1973; from Life in a Tin Can, 1973)	B. Gibb, R. Gibb, M. Gibb	4:08
11.	"Wouldn't I Be Someone" (A-side single, 1973; from Best of Bee Gees, Volume 2, 1973)	B. Gibb, R. Gibb, M. Gibb	5:39
12.	"Elisa" (B-side of the "Wouldn't I Be Someone" single, 1973)	B. Gibb, R. Gibb, M. Gibb	2:48
13.	"King and Country" (Previously unreleased, except in Germany)	B. Gibb, R. Gibb, M. Gibb	5:19
14.	"Mr. Natural" (A-side single, 1974; from Mr. Natural, 1974)	B. Gibb, R. Gibb	3:48
15.	"It Doesn't Matter Much to Me" (B-side of the "Mr. Natural" single, 1974)	B. Gibb, R. Gibb, M. Gibb	3:49
16.	"Throw a Penny" (A-side single, 1974; from Mr. Natural, 1974)	B. Gibb, R. Gibb	4:45
17.	"Charade" (A-side single, 1974; from Mr. Natural, 1974)	B. Gibb, R. Gibb	4:11

Chapter III: 1975–1979
No.	Title	Writer(s)	Length
1.	"Jive Talkin'" (A-side single, 1975; from Main Course, 1975)	B. Gibb, R. Gibb, M. Gibb	3:44
2.	"Nights on Broadway" (A-side single, 1975; from Main Course, 1975)	B. Gibb, R. Gibb, M. Gibb	4:33
3.	"Fanny (Be Tender with My Love)" (A-side single, 1976; from Main Course, 1975)	B. Gibb, R. Gibb, M. Gibb	3:44
4.	"You Should Be Dancing" (long version) (A-side single, 1976; from Children of the World, 1976)	B. Gibb, R. Gibb, M. Gibb	4:44
5.	"Love So Right" (A-side single, 1976; from Children of the World, 1976)	B. Gibb, R. Gibb, M. Gibb	3:39
6.	"Boogie Child" (A-side single, 1977; from Children of the World, 1976)	B. Gibb, R. Gibb, M. Gibb	4:14
7.	"Edge of the Universe" (live) (A-side single, 1977; from Here at Last... Bee Gees... Live, 1977)	B. Gibb, R. Gibb, M. Gibb	5:15
8.	"How Deep Is Your Love" (A-side single, 1977; from the Saturday Night Fever soundtrack, 1977)	B. Gibb, R. Gibb, M. Gibb	4:04
9.	"Stayin' Alive" (A-side single, 1977; from the Saturday Night Fever soundtrack, 1977)	B. Gibb, R. Gibb, M. Gibb	4:44
10.	"Night Fever" (A-side single, 1978; from the Saturday Night Fever soundtrack, 1977)	B. Gibb, R. Gibb, M. Gibb	3:31
11.	"More Than a Woman" (from the Saturday Night Fever soundtrack, 1977)	B. Gibb, R. Gibb, M. Gibb	3:17
12.	"If I Can't Have You" (B-side of the "Stayin' Alive" single, 1977; from Bee Gees Greatest, 1979)	B. Gibb, R. Gibb, M. Gibb	3:21
13.	"(Our Love) Don't Throw It All Away" (from Bee Gees Greatest, 1979)	B. Gibb, Blue Weaver	4:05
14.	"Too Much Heaven" (A-side single, 1978; from Spirits Having Flown, 1979)	B. Gibb, R. Gibb, M. Gibb	4:57
15.	"Tragedy" (A-side single, 1979; from Spirits Having Flown, 1979)	B. Gibb, R. Gibb, M. Gibb	5:05
16.	"Love You Inside Out" (A-side single, 1979; from Spirits Having Flown, 1979)	B. Gibb, R. Gibb, M. Gibb	4:13

Chapter IV: 1981–1989
No.	Title	Writer(s)	Length
1.	"He's a Liar" (A-side single, 1981; from Living Eyes, 1981)	B. Gibb, R. Gibb, M. Gibb	4:00
2.	"Another Lonely Night in New York" (Robin Gibb solo track) (A-side single, 1983; from How Old Are You?, 1982)	R. Gibb, M. Gibb	4:13
3.	"The Woman in You" (A-side single, 1983; from the Staying Alive soundtrack, 1983)	B. Gibb, R. Gibb, M. Gibb	4:01
4.	"Someone Belonging to Someone" (A-side single, 1983; from the Staying Alive soundtrack, 1983)	B. Gibb, R. Gibb, M. Gibb	4:22
5.	"Toys" (Robin Gibb solo track) (A-side single, 1986; from Walls Have Eyes, 1985)	B. Gibb, R. Gibb, M. Gibb	4:40
6.	"E.S.P." (demo version) (previously unreleased, 1990; originally from E.S.P., 1987)	B. Gibb, R. Gibb, M. Gibb	4:43
7.	"You Win Again" (A-side single, 1987; from E.S.P., 1987)	B. Gibb, R. Gibb, M. Gibb	3:58
8.	"Ordinary Lives" (A-side single, 1988; from One, 1989)	B. Gibb, R. Gibb, M. Gibb	4:03
9.	"One" (A-side single, 1989; from One, 1989)	B. Gibb, R. Gibb, M. Gibb	4:50
10.	"Juliet" (live) (previously unreleased)	R. Gibb, M. Gibb	3:35
11.	"To Love Somebody" (live) (previously unreleased)	B. Gibb, R. Gibb	3:41
12.	"Medley: New York Mining Disaster 1941, Holiday, Too Much Heaven, Heartbreaker, Islands in the Stream, Run To Me, World" (live) (previously unreleased)	B. Gibb, R. Gibb, M. Gibb	12:17
13.	"Spicks and Specks" (live) (previously unreleased)	B. Gibb	2:33

- On releases of Tales outside North America, three Barry Gibb solo tracks were added to Chapter IV from the "Hawks" soundtrack right after Robin Gibb's "Toys": "My Eternal Love", "Where Tomorrow Is" and "Letting Go".
- The release of Tales on streaming service Spotify follows the track listing used outside North America, to some extent. The three Barry solo songs from "Hawks" are listed, but not playable, and the same is true of the trio's demo of "ESP".
