= Best of Bee Gees, Volume 2 =

Best of Bee Gees Volume 2

Compilation album by Bee Gees
- Released: August 1973
- Recorded: July 25, 1967–April 12, 1972 in London and New York City
- Genre: Pop
- Length: 52:17
- Label: Polydor; Rhino 2008 reissue
- Producer: Bee Gees, Robert Stigwood

Bee Gees chronology
Life in a Tin Can (1973)	Best of Bee Gees Volume 2 (1973)	Mr. Natural (1974)

Professional ratings
Review scores
Source	Rating
AllMusic	4/5 stars
Christgau's Record Guide	C+
The Rolling Stone Album Guide	2/5 stars

Best of Bee Gees Vol. 2 is a compilation album of hits by the Bee Gees released in 1973. The album, briefly revived on CD in the late 1980s, went out of print, but was reissued by Rhino in November 2008.

Whereas the original Best of Bee Gees had focused on songs that had been major hits for the group in America and/or the United Kingdom up to 1969, this follow-up collection featured 1969–72 chart hits and also album tracks from their late-1960s albums Horizontal, Idea and Odessa, plus "Morning of My Life" – which featured on the soundtrack of the 1971 film Melody – and Robin Gibb's big 1969 non-US solo hit Saved by the Bell. The album featured nothing from Bee Gees' 1st, which had already been represented by five tracks on the earlier compilation.

The front cover featured a group photograph from the same photoshoot that had been sourced for the front cover of their Life in a Tin Can album released earlier in 1973, despite the fact that nothing from that album appeared on this compilation.

== Track listing ==
Side 1
No.	Title	Original album	Length
1.	"How Can You Mend a Broken Heart" (Barry Gibb, Robin Gibb)	Trafalgar, September 1971 (US), November 1971 (UK)	3:57
2.	"I.O.I.O." (Barry Gibb, Maurice Gibb)	Cucumber Castle, April 1970	2:57
3.	"Don't Wanna Live Inside Myself" (Barry Gibb)	Trafalgar	5:25
4.	"Melody Fair" (Barry Gibb, Robin Gibb, Maurice Gibb)	Odessa, March 1969	3:48
5.	"My World" (Barry Gibb, Robin Gibb)	Single, 1972	4:18
6.	"Let There Be Love" (Barry Gibb, Robin Gibb, Maurice Gibb)	Idea, September 1968	3:32
7.	"Saved by the Bell" (Robin Gibb)	Robin's Reign (Robin Gibb solo album), February 1970	3:05

Side 2
No.	Title	Original album	Length
1.	"Lonely Days" (Barry Gibb, Robin Gibb, Maurice Gibb)	2 Years On, November 1970	3:46
2.	"Morning of My Life" (Barry Gibb)	Melody Soundtrack, May 1971	3:53
3.	"Don't Forget to Remember" (Barry Gibb, Maurice Gibb)	Cucumber Castle	3:28
4.	"And the Sun Will Shine" (Barry Gibb, Robin Gibb, Maurice Gibb)	Horizontal, February 1968	3:34
5.	"Run to Me" (Barry Gibb, Robin Gibb, Maurice Gibb)	To Whom It May Concern, October 1972	3:10
6.	"Man For All Seasons" (Barry Gibb, Robin Gibb, Maurice Gibb)	2 Years On	2:58
7.	"Alive" (Barry Gibb, Maurice Gibb)	To Whom It May Concern	4:00

== Personnel ==
- Barry Gibb - vocals and rhythm guitar except on 7
- Robin Gibb - vocals, organ, drum machine except on 2 and 10, guitar on 7
- Maurice Gibb - bass, piano, vocals
- Vince Melouney - lead guitar on 6 and 11
- Colin Petersen - drums on 2, 4, 6, 10 and 11
- Geoff Bridgford - drums on 1, 3, 5, 8, 9, 13 and 14

Additional personnel

- Alan Kendall - lead guitar on 1, 3, 5, 12 and 14
- Clem Cattini - drums on 12
- Bill Shepherd - orchestral arrangement
- Kenny Clayton - orchestral arrangement on 7

== Alternate versions ==
=== North America ===
The U.S. (RSO SO 875) and Canadian (RSO 2394 112) releases of this album included the song "Wouldn't I Be Someone" from the Bee Gees' unreleased album A Kick In The Head Is Worth Eight In The Pants and rearranged the tracks in the following order:

Side 1

1. "Wouldn't I Be Someone"
2. "I.O.I.O."
3. "My World
4. "Saved By The Bell
5. "Don't Forget To Remember
6. "And The Sun Will Shine
7. "Run To Me
8. "Man For All Seasons

Side 2

1. "How Can You Mend A Broken Heart"
2. "Don't Want To Live Inside Myself"
3. "Melody Fair"
4. "Let There Be Love"
5. "Lonely Days"
6. "Morning Of My Life"
7. "Alive"

=== Germany ===
The German version of Best of Bee Gees Vol. 2 on Polydor (Stereo Vinyl 2480 030, music cassette 3194033) featured many different tracks, including solo work by all the three brothers. The cover features different photos and the front and back, taken by German photographer Klaus Köhler. Most likely, this compilation was released a year or two prior to 1973.

All tracks written by Barry, Maurice and Robin except where noted, followed by original album inclusion of tracks not included in the original track listing above

Side 1

1. "Let There Be Love"
2. "I.O.I.O."
3. "Don't Forget To Remember"
4. "Saved By The Bell" (Robin Gibb)
5. "Lamplight" (from Odessa)
6. "One Million Years" (Robin Gibb, Robin Gibb solo single, October 1969)

Side 2

1. "August October" (Robin Gibb, from Robin's Reign)
2. "Sweetheart" (from Cucumber Castle)
3. "Railroad" (Maurice Gibb, Maurice Gibb solo single, April 1970)
4. "I'll Kiss Your Memory" (Barry Gibb, Barry Gibb solo single, May 1970)
5. "Lonely Days"
6. "Tomorrow Tomorrow" (Single, May 1969)
