= List of unreleased material recorded by the Bee Gees =

The Bee Gees are known to have performed and/or recorded a number of songs and other instrumentals which have never been officially released on a single or album. The group's unreleased works were later recorded by well-known artists such as P. P. Arnold, Leo Sayer, Percy Sledge and others.

== Sessions ==
=== Spicks and Specks ===
| Song | Writer(s) | Duration | Notes |
|---|---|---|---|
| "All the King's Horses" | Barry, Robin and Maurice Gibb | 1:45 | Recorded 1966. Released by Ronnie Burns in 1967 |

=== Bee Gees' 1st ===
| Song | Writer(s) | Duration | Notes |
|---|---|---|---|
| "Life" | Barry, Robin and Maurice Gibb | Unknown | Recorded on 23 March 1967. |
| "End of My Song" | Barry and Robin Gibb | Unknown | It was also called the "Otis Redding demo" with lead vocal by Barry. It was intended for Otis Redding. |

=== Horizontal ===
| Song | Writer(s) | Duration | Notes |
|---|---|---|---|
| "Granny's Mr. Dog" | Barry, Robin and Maurice Gibb | Unknown | Recorded on 25 July 1967. |
| "All So Lonely!" | Colin Petersen or Vince Melouney | Unknown | Petersen and Melouney, the first two non-Gibb brother members that was also an official member of the Bee Gees wrote the song. |
| "Vince's Number" | Barry, Robin and Maurice Gibb | Unknown | Recorded on 31 August 1967. In a 2005 interview with Melouney, he identified that the song was written by the brothers for him to sing, but the idea was dropped for some reason as the song was sung by Robin. |
| "Maccleby's Secret" | Barry, Robin and Maurice Gibb | Unknown | Recorded 3 October 1967. |
| "When Things Go Wrong" | Barry, Robin and Maurice Gibb | Unknown | Recorded 7 November 1967, two days after the Hither Green rail crash. |

=== Idea ===
| Song | Writer(s) | Duration | Notes |
|---|---|---|---|
| "I Can Lift a Mountain" | Barry, Robin and Maurice Gibb | Unknown | Originally written in 1968, later renamed "We Can Lift a Mountain" and recorded at the same time as "Chocolate Symphony". The Bee Gees were contracted to write songs for a Swedish television series based on the Pippi Longstocking books by Astrid Lindgren. An acetate has preserved a demo of Robin in character saying 'I am just a girl, but...' and on into this track. The date of this demo is not known. |
| "She Is Russia" | Barry, Robin and Maurice Gibb (probably) | Unknown | Recorded on 15 January 1968. |
| "In the Middle of the Grass" | Barry, Robin and Maurice Gibb | Unknown | Recorded in 1967 or 1968. |
| "Let Your Heart Out" | Barry, Robin and Maurice Gibb | 2:35 | Recorded in 1967 or 1968. |
| "The Square Cup" | Barry and Maurice Gibb | Unknown | Recorded in 1967 or 1968. |
| "Stepping Out" | Barry, Robin and Maurice Gibb (probably) | Unknown | Recorded on 12 June 1968 as a jam session. |
| "No Name" | Barry, Robin and Maurice Gibb (probably) | Unknown | Recorded on 12 June 1968 as a jam session. |
| "Maypole Mews" | Barry, Robin and Maurice Gibb | Unknown | Recorded in 21 and 25 June 1968. |
| "Men of Men" | Barry, Robin and Maurice Gibb | Unknown | Recorded in 21 and 25 June 1968, the song was a favorite of Maurice's as he re-recorded it in 1970 with his band, the Bloomfields. |

=== "Tomorrow Tomorrow" ===
| Song | Writer(s) | Duration | Notes |
|---|---|---|---|
| "Ping Pong" | Barry and Maurice Gibb | Unknown | Recorded 19 March 1969, with the single "Tomorrow Tomorrow" and "Sun in My Morning". |

=== Cucumber Castle ===
| Song | Writer(s) | Duration | Notes |
|---|---|---|---|
| "Who Knows What a Room Is" | Barry and Maurice Gibb | 4:02 | Recorded on 7 May 1969, IBC Studios |
| "Give a Hand, Take a Hand" | Barry and Maurice Gibb | 3:32 | Recorded around May 1969, IBC Studios. Later covered by P.P. Arnold and re-recorded for the 1974 album Mr. Natural. |
| "The Day Your Eyes Meet Mine" | Barry and Maurice Gibb | 3:14 | Recorded around July 1969, IBC Studios, later recorded by Barry Gibb in 1970. |
| "Everytime I See You Smile" | Barry and Maurice Gibb | 2:45 | Recorded around July 1969, IBC Studios |
| "There Goes My Heart Again" | Barry and Maurice Gibb | Unknown | Recorded around July 1969, IBC Studios |
| "Every Morning, Every Night (The Only Way)" | Barry Gibb | 3:02 | Recorded on 22 September 1969, IBC Studios |
| "Go Tell Cheyenne" | Barry and Maurice Gibb | Unknown | Recorded around September 1969, IBC Studios |
| "High and Windy Mountain" | Barry and Maurice Gibb | Unknown | Recorded on 25 September 1969, IBC Studios |
| "One Bad Thing" | Barry and Maurice Gibb | Unknown | Recorded on 25 September 1969, IBC Studios; Later recorded by Barry Gibb in 1970. |
| "Twinky" | Barry and Maurice Gibb | Unknown | Recorded around October 1969, IBC Studios. |
| "End of My Song" | Barry, Robin and Maurice Gibb | 3:31 | Recorded on 15 October 1969, Recorded Sound Studios. Originally written in 1967 for Otis Redding to sing. |
| "Julia" | Barry and Maurice Gibb | Unknown | Recorded on 16 October 1969, Recorded Sound Studios. |

=== 2 Years On ===
| Song | Writer(s) | Duration | Notes |
|---|---|---|---|
| "You Got to Lose it in the End" | Barry, Robin and Maurice Gibb | Unknown | Recorded on 26 August 1970. |
| "Little Red Train" | Barry, Robin and Maurice Gibb | Unknown | Recorded on 26 August 1970. |
| "Sweet Summer Rain" | Barry, Robin and Maurice Gibb | Unknown | Recorded on 26 August 1970. |
| "Maybe Tomorrow" | Barry, Robin and Maurice Gibb | Unknown | Recorded on 27 August 1970. |
| "Don't Forget Me Ida" | Barry Gibb | 3:34 | Recorded on 30 September 1970. |
| "Lost" | Barry, Robin or Maurice Gibb | Unknown | Recorded on 5 October 1970. |
| "Fantasy" | Barry, Robin or Maurice Gibb | Unknown | Recorded on 5 October 1970. |
| "To Dance Again" | Barry, Robin and Maurice Gibb | 2:08 | An instrumental track, recorded around September and October 1970, composed for a TV version of The Three Musketeers. Appeared on various bootlegs along with "Modulating Maurice" (a song written by Maurice and Ringo Starr in 1969 in Starr's home studio). |

=== Trafalgar ===
| Song | Writer(s) | Duration | Notes |
|---|---|---|---|
| "Together" | Barry Gibb | Unknown | Recorded on 13 December 1970. |
| "Over the Hill and the Mountain" | Barry, Robin or Maurice Gibb | Unknown | Recorded on 13 December 1970. |
| "Merrily Merry Eyes" | Barry and Robin Gibb | 3:13 | Recorded on 13 December 1970. |
| "If I Were the Sky" | Barry and Robin Gibb | 2:33 | Recorded on 28 January 1971. |
| "Bring Out the Thoughts in Me" | Barry and Robin Gibb (probably) | Unknown | Recorded on 28 January 1971. |
| "Ellan Vannin" | Eliza Craven Green | 1:38 | Recorded on 28 January 1971, a cover of the national anthem of Isle of Man. Their 1971 version was not released. |
| "You Leave Me Hangin' On" | Unknown | Unknown | Recorded 4 February 1971 |
| "Boots" | Unknown | Unknown | Recorded 4 February 1971 |
| "Nightwatch" | Unknown | Unknown | Recorded 4 February 1971 |
| "C'mon Tappelais" | Unknown | Unknown | Recorded 4 February 1971 |
| "Telegraph to the Pine Trees" | Unknown | Unknown | Recorded 4 February 1971 |
| "You? Me Down" | Unknown | Unknown | Recorded 4 February 1971. The title is not fully legible. |
| "Long Chain On" | Unknown | Unknown | Recorded 4 February 1971 |
| "Cigarette" | Unknown | Unknown | Recorded 4 February 1971 |
| "Blue" | Unknown | Unknown | Recorded 4 February 1971 |
| "Deep in the Dark of the Day" | Barry, Robin and Maurice Gibb | Unknown | Recorded 23 March 1971. |
| "Something" | Barry, Robin or Maurice Gibb | Unknown | Recorded 23 March 1971. |
| "Amorous Aristocracy" | Barry and Robin Gibb | Unknown | Recorded on 23 March 1971 as a demo only. |
| "Irresponsible, Unreliable, Indispensable Blues" | Barry Gibb | 2:03 | Recorded on 29 March 1971. |
| "A Word of Love" | Barry, Robin or Maurice Gibb | Unknown | Recorded on 29 March 1971. |
| "Engines, Aeroplanes" | Robin Gibb | 2:18 | Recorded on 17 April 1971. Originally written and recorded back in 1970 for Gibb's second solo LP, Sing Slowly Sisters. |

=== To Whom It May Concern ===
| Song | Writer(s) | Duration | Notes |
|---|---|---|---|
| "It's All Wrong" | Barry, Robin or Maurice Gibb | Unknown | Recorded on 10 April 1972. |
| "Lay Down and Sleep" | Barry, Robin or Maurice Gibb | Unknown | Recorded 21 April 1972. |

=== A Kick in the Head Is Worth Eight in the Pants ===
All of the songs on what would be the Bee Gees' 12th studio album, A Kick in the Head Is Worth Eight in the Pants are unreleased, except "Wouldn't I Be Someone", "Elisa", "It Doesn't Matter Much to Me" and "King and Country".

=== Main Course ===
| Song | Writer(s) | Duration | Notes |
|---|---|---|---|
| "Was It All in Vain?" | Barry and Robin Gibb | Unknown | Recorded 6 January 1975. |
| "Your Love Will Save the World" | Barry and Robin Gibb | 3:25 | Recorded 9 January 1975, later recorded by Percy Sledge. |
| "Only One Woman" | Barry, Robin and Maurice Gibb | Unknown | Recorded 25 January 1975, the song was originally written by the Gibbs for English rock duo The Marbles in 1968. |

=== Children of the World ===
| Song | Writer(s) | Duration | Notes |
|---|---|---|---|
| "Walk Before You Run" | Barry Gibb and Stephen Stills | Unknown | Recorded 26 February 1976. Credited to Barry Gibb and singer Stephen Stills. Keyboardist Blue Weaver recalls playing piano on it, and also says that it was a jam session. |
| "The Feel" | Barry Gibb (probably) | Unknown | Recorded 6 March 1976. |

=== Spirits Having Flown ===
| Song | Writer(s) | Duration | Notes |
|---|---|---|---|
| "Desire" | Barry, Robin and Maurice Gibb | 4:24 | Recorded around 1978 on the Spirits Having Flown. It was rejected and given to Andy Gibb, and his version was released as a single and reached the US Top 5. |

=== Living Eyes ===
| Song | Writer(s) | Duration | Notes |
|---|---|---|---|
| "City of Angels" | Barry, Robin and Maurice Gibb (probably) | 3:46 | Recorded around 1981. |
| "Mind Over Matter" | Barry, Robin and Maurice Gibb (probably) | 4:30 | Recorded around 1981. |
| "The Promise You Made" | Barry, Robin and Maurice Gibb (probably) | 3:14 | Recorded around 1981. |
| "Heat of the Night" | Barry, Robin and Maurice Gibb | 4:02 | Recorded around 1981. |
| "Hold Her in Your Hand" | Barry and Maurice Gibb | Unknown | The song was later re-recorded 1984 by Maurice Gibb for the soundtrack of the film A Breed Apart, and later became Maurice's second and last solo single. |
| "Heart (Stop Beating in Time)" | Barry, Robin and Maurice Gibb | 3:22 | The song was later recorded by Leo Sayer. And later recorded by Canadian singer Véronique Béliveau with French lyrics as "Please (Dis-moi c’que tu as)". |
| "Loving You Is Killing Me" | Barry and Robin Gibb | Unknown | Unreleased from 1981. |

=== Staying Alive soundtrack ===
| Song | Writer(s) | Duration | Notes |
|---|---|---|---|
| "River of Souls" | Barry, Robin and Maurice Gibb | 6:57 | Possibly from 1982, with lead vocals by Barry Gibb. It was intended for the final dance sequence of Staying Alive, the sequel to Saturday Night Fever. The track has been described as a "terrific number, the music changing several times, building in intensity, with two main melodies and an instrumental section." |

=== E.S.P. ===
| Song | Writer(s) | Duration | Notes |
|---|---|---|---|
| "Young Love" | Barry, Robin and Maurice Gibb | 3:57 | The only song that was dropped in E.S.P.. |
