= You Should Be Dancing: The 12″ Collection =

Box set by the Bee Gees
- Released: 27 February 2026
- Genre: Disco; pop
- Label: UMe

The Bee Gees chronology
How Can You Mend a Broken Heart: Music from the Motion Picture (2025)	You Should Be Dancing: The 12″ Collection (2026)

You Should Be Dancing: The 12″ Collection is a boxed set of 12" singles by British pop group the Bee Gees, released on 27 February 2026, by Universal Music Enterprises. It is available in only 1,000 copies. A press release calls it a "four-disc collectors’ item featuring the highly sought-after original 12-inch versions of some of Barry, Robin, and Maurice Gibb’s most iconic dance floor-fillers, plus previously unreleased extended versions of five further Gibb brothers’ classics." It features previously unheard extended versions of "Jive Talkin'", "Tragedy", "Nights on Broadway" and "Love You Inside Out".

== Track listing ==
Disc one
No.	Title	Length
1.	"You Should Be Dancing" (extended version)
2.	"Boogie Child" (extended version)
3.	"You Stepped into My Life" (extended version)

Disc two
No.	Title	Length
1.	"Stayin' Alive" (special disco version)
2.	"If I Can't Have You" (extended version)
3.	"Night Fever" (special disco version)
4.	"More Than a Woman" (special disco version)

No.	Title	Length
1.	"Jive Talkin'" (extended version)
2.	"Nights on Broadway" (extended version)
3.	"Tragedy" (extended version)
4.	"Love You Inside Out" (extended version)

No.	Title	Length
1.	"More Than A Woman" (SG Lewis remix)
2.	"Decadance" (album version)
3.	"Decadance" (Ben Liebrand vocal mix)
