= Mr. Natural (song) =

Single by Bee Gees

from the album Mr. Natural
- B-side: "It Doesn't Matter Much To Me"
- Released: 29 March 1974
- Recorded: 8 January 1974; Command Studios, London
- Genre: Blue-eyed soul
- Length: 3:46 (album version); 3:34 (single version)
- Label: RSO
- Songwriters: Barry Gibb, Robin Gibb
- Producer: Arif Mardin

Bee Gees singles chronology
"Wouldn't I Be Someone" (1973)	"Mr. Natural" (1974)	"Throw a Penny" (1974)

"Mr. Natural" is a song by the Bee Gees, written by Barry and Robin Gibb. On 29 March 1974, it was released as a single and also released on the album of the same name in 1974. It was backed with a folk rock number, "It Doesn't Matter Much to Me". This was the group's first single to be produced by Arif Mardin.

== Background ==
The group had recorded "It Doesn't Matter Much to Me" and "Voices" on 4 January during sessions at IBC Studios, London. They continued to record two more songs on 8 January, including this track, and "Had a Lot of Love Last Night" at Command Studios, also in London. It was chosen as the first single and later became the title track of the album.

The song is an instance of Robin singing higher harmony to Barry's lower harmony.

== Release ==
Released during a period in which The Bee Gees had just had their album A Kick In The Head Is Worth Eight In The Pants rejected by their manager Robert Stigwood, "Mr. Natural" barely scraped the lower end of the Billboard Hot 100, climbing to #93 and #11 in Australia. The promotional video for this song was filmed in black and white, and was televised at 192 TV. It was regularly performed on the Mr. Natural tour in 1974. Footage of the performance in Melbourne, Australia of the song (Mr. Natural) also exists. On 25 February 1974, the Bee Gees made their appearance on The Mike Douglas Show but only as a playback, on that performance, the backing band members being Alan Kendall, Dennis Bryon and Geoff Westley. It was also performed at The Merv Griffin Show.

== Reception ==
Cash Box said that "this incredibly delicious track by the chart veterans is their best ever" and that "spiced with a dash of rock, it is a totally unique excursion for them." Record World said that the song showcases "the ultimate in tight, tasty vocal harmonies."

== Personnel ==
- Robin Gibb — lead and harmony vocals (first verse and chorus)
- Barry Gibb — lead and harmony vocals (second verse), acoustic guitar
- Maurice Gibb — bass guitar, mellotron, harmony vocals
- Alan Kendall — electric guitar
- Dennis Bryon — drums
- Geoff Westley — piano

== Chart positions ==
=== Weekly charts ===
Chart (1974)	Peak position
Australia (Kent Music Report)	11
Canada Adult Contemporary (RPM)	12
Canada Pop (RPM)	90
US Billboard Hot 100	93
US Cash Box	87
US Record World	94

=== Year-end charts ===
Chart (1974)	Rank
Australia (Kent Music Report)	72
