= A Kick in the Head Is Worth Eight in the Pants =

Studio album by Bee Gees
- Released: Unreleased
- Recorded: October 1972 (The Record Plant, Los Angeles); January 1973 (London)
- Genre: Rock; soft rock; folk rock; gospel
- Label: RSO; Polydor
- Producer: Barry Gibb; Robin Gibb; Maurice Gibb

A Kick in the Head Is Worth Eight in the Pants is an unreleased studio album by the Bee Gees. Originally known as The Bee Gees Album, recording began in late 1972 at The Record Plant in Los Angeles around the same time as tracks for Life in a Tin Can were being recorded. Ten tracks were recorded in October 1972 and four more were recorded in January 1973 in London, England.

== History ==
By the end of 1972, The Bee Gees had two albums recorded and ready for release. The first to be released was Life in a Tin Can in January 1973. The first and only single from that album, "Saw a New Morning", was not a hit in the US, peaking at No. 94. The parent album fared only slightly better, climbing to No. 69. When it was time to release the follow-up album, Robert Stigwood, manager of The Bee Gees and owner of RSO Records, rejected the proposed album after the failure of the lead single, "Wouldn't I Be Someone". The album was shelved, and only a few songs ever received official release: "Elisa", "Wouldn't I Be Someone" and "King and Country" were released as singles in 1973, and then again in 1990 on the box set Tales from the Brothers Gibb. Another track, "It Doesn't Matter Much to Me", was released on a budget label compilation album in the UK in 1974. That track was re-recorded for inclusion on The Bee Gees' 1974 album, Mr. Natural, but was only released as the B-side of the title track when it was released as a single. A 30-second clip of "Castles in the Air" made it onto a 1978 promotional album called The Words and Music of Barry Gibb, Robin Gibb and Maurice Gibb.

== Track listing ==
=== The Record Plant 1972 ===
1. "Elisa" – 2:53 (released as the B-side of "Wouldn't I Be Someone" in June 1973)
2. "Wouldn't I Be Someone" – 5:44 (released as a single in June 1973 in edited form at 3:24)
3. "A Lonely Violin" – 3:15
4. "Losers And Lovers" – 3:17
5. "Home Again Rivers" – 3:18
6. "Harry's Gate" – 3:30
7. "Rocky L. A." – 3:54
8. "Castles In The Air" – 3:41 (30-second clip released in 1978 on a RSO Records promo album)
9. "Where Is Your Sister" – 3:11
10. "It Doesn't Matter Much To Me" – 4:29 (released on the UK compilation Gotta Get a Message to You in 1974)

=== London 1973 ===
1. "King And Country" – 5:23 (released as the B-side of "Wouldn't I Be Someone" in Germany only)
2. "Jesus In Heaven" – 3:26
3. "Life Am I Wasting My Time" – 2:57
4. "Dear Mr. Kissinger" – 4:09

== Personnel ==
- Barry Gibb – vocals, rhythm guitar
- Robin Gibb – vocals
- Maurice Gibb – vocals, bass, piano, keyboard, guitars

Additional personnel

- Alan Kendall – lead guitar
- Jim Keltner – drums

== Bootlegs ==
The album has been bootlegged by Drifter Records and Demon Records in Malaysia, both containing all of the above tracks.

== Cover versions ==
"Castles in the Air" was covered by Graham Bonnet in 1973 and included as a B-side on his "Trying to Say Goodbye" single. "A Lonely Violin" was covered by Percy Sledge in 2004 and included on the album Shining Through the Rain.
