= Alive (Bee Gees song) =

Single by Bee Gees

from the album To Whom It May Concern
- B-side: "Paper Mache, Cabbages And Kings"
- Released: 10 November 1972
- Recorded: 21 October 1971; IBC Studios, London
- Genre: Soft rock, symphonic, pop
- Length: 4:03
- Label: Polydor, Philips (elsewhere); Atco (US/CA)
- Songwriters: Barry Gibb, Maurice Gibb
- Producers: Robert Stigwood, Barry Gibb, Robin Gibb, Maurice Gibb

Bee Gees singles chronology
"Run To Me" (1972)	"Alive" (1972)	"Saw a New Morning" (1973)

Audio sample
- file; help

"Alive" is a ballad recorded by the Bee Gees for their album To Whom It May Concern. It was the second and last single from the album, being released on 10 November 1972 worldwide. The song was credited to Barry and Maurice Gibb and produced by the Gibbs and their manager Robert Stigwood.

== Composition and recording ==
It is another piano ballad (customary for Bee Gees singles during this period), which Barry has noted that he doesn't even remember writing. As mastered for the album, the inherent dynamic range in the vocal and piano has unfortunately been compressed almost out of existence, but it still comes across as an expressive ballad.

"Alive" was recorded on October 21, 1971, "My World" having also been recorded that previous week. Geoff Bridgford's drum work on this song marked his last appearance on any Bee Gees singles after he left in January 1972. (The previous single, "Run to Me", was recorded after Bridgford's departure).

== Releases ==
The remastered version found on Tales from the Brothers Gibb somewhat increases the range missing from the original album release. The single reached number 34 on the US charts in 1973 and debuted on #63 on that chart. It was the group's last top 40 hit in either the US or UK until "Jive Talkin'" in 1975. "Alive" was the group's last release on the Atco label. In 1973, the Bee Gees' manager, Robert Stigwood formed his own label, RSO Records, where the Gibb brothers enjoyed their most success. On the promo video for the single, which was originally made for the Dutch TV programme TopPop and was broadcast on 23 December 1972, Maurice first appears playing the piano, with Barry and Robin appearing only holding a microphone.

== Reception ==
Billboard called the single a "dynamite, driving ballad." Cash Box described it as a "fine selection in traditional Bee Gees fashion." Record World called it a "romantic gem filled with those lush strings and velvet harmonies."

== Personnel ==
- Barry Gibb — lead vocals, guitar
- Maurice Gibb — piano, bass
- Geoff Bridgford — drums
- Bill Shepherd — orchestral arrangement

== Charts ==
=== Weekly charts ===
Charts	Peak position
Australia (Kent Music Report)	45
Canada (RPM)	28
Netherlands (Dutch Top 40)	17
US Billboard Hot 100	34
US Billboard Easy Listening Charts	20
US Cash Box	26
US Record World	33

=== Year-end charts ===
Chart (1972–1973)	Position
Netherlands (Dutch Top 40)	23
