= Charade (Bee Gees song) =

Single by Bee Gees

from the album Mr. Natural
- B-side: "Heavy Breathing"
- Released: August 1974
- Recorded: 20 December 1973; IBC Studios, London
- Genre: Blue-eyed soul, orchestral pop
- Length: 4:13 (album); 3:14 (single)
- Label: RSO, Mercury
- Songwriters: Barry Gibb, Robin Gibb
- Producer: Arif Mardin

Bee Gees singles chronology
"Throw a Penny" (1974)	"Charade" (1974)	"Jive Talkin'" (1975)

"Charade" is a ballad written by Barry Gibb and Robin Gibb released in 1974 by the Bee Gees. It was the third and final single released from the Mr. Natural album. Like the parent album, the single was not a hit and only managed to climb to #31 on Billboard's Adult Contemporary chart in late 1974. It did reach the Top 10 in Chile, peaking at #7.

== Background ==
This song was recorded on 20 December 1973 in IBC Studios, London and made full use of Arif Mardin's talents as arranger, with Phil Bodner's clarinet solo at the song's instrumental break. Three days later, the Bee Gees and the backing band spent some time crossfading this track into "Throw a Penny" with a quiet sound effect and "Throw a Penny" into "Down the Road" with a newly recorded link track.

The singer said that they made their love in the sand at summer nights and they held their love hand in hand at the dawn and they listened to the ocean where the music is playing, the words on the music is about their two hearts were saying that only two lovers can hear. They can follow the sun until the daylight is gone they can gaze at the sky until the night is over, the light of his life as she was welcome to his charade. This track has also a gripping chorus, ethereal harmonies and deserves to be around for years to come.

The song starts with a Fender Rhodes electric piano played by Geoff Westley. On 0:46, Arif Mardin's orchestra and strings arrangement was heard. At 1:16, Robin Gibb takes the lead vocal his first line on this song was And this feeling. At 2:19, the instrumental break was started as Phil Bodner's clarinet was heard.

== Reception ==
Billboard praised the refrain and the harmony vocals, saying that it was the Bee Gees "strongest release" in years.

== Chart performance ==
Chart (1974)	Peak position
Canada Adult Contemporary Charts (RPM)	32
Chile Top 100 Singles Chart	7
U.S. Bubbling Under Hot 100 Singles (Billboard)	103
U.S. Billboard Easy Listening Charts	31

== Cover versions ==
- Hajji Alejandro, a Filipino singer sang the melody of this song in 1976, with Tagalog lyrics by Willy Cruz as "Tag-araw... Tag-ulan" (Summer and Rain). "Tag-Araw, Tag Ulan" was later covered by Filipina singer Joey Albert. The melody was also used by Tito, Vic & Joey as one of the parody songs in their 1977 album, called "Kajjo Department" with different lyrics.
- Samantha Sang recorded "Charade" for her first album Emotion on which the title track written also by Barry and Robin Gibb.
- Charade was recorded in Portuguese by Brazilian artist Ana Gazzola and included on her album Musicas e Palavras dos Bee Gees.
