= Melody (soundtrack) =

Soundtrack album by Bee Gees
- Released: May 1971
- Recorded: April 1967–1971
- Genre: Pop
- Length: 35:49
- Label: Polydor (UK); Atco (US)

Bee Gees chronology
2 Years On (1971)	Melody (1971)	Trafalgar (1972)

Melody is the soundtrack album for the film Melody (or S.W.A.L.K., the name it was initially marketed under in the U.K.). It was released in 1971 and is performed by the Bee Gees, Crosby, Stills, Nash & Young, and Barry Howard (aka Al Barry) of The Aces, Desmond Dekker's backing group. It reached No. 1 on the Japanese charts. "In the Morning" was first recorded in 1965 by The Bee Gees, and was re-recorded in 1970 for the film; its title was changed to "Morning of My Life", though the song is credited under its original title on the album. The songs "Melody Fair", "First of May", and "Give Your Best" were originally released on The Bee Gees' 1969 album Odessa.

== Track listing ==
1. "In the Morning" by The Bee Gees - 3:54
2. "In the Morning" (Instrumental) by Richard Hewson Orchestra - 2:01
3. "Melody Fair" by The Bee Gees - 3:45
4. "Melody Fair" (Instrumental) by Richard Hewson Orchestra - 1:21
5. "Spicks and Specks" by Richard Hewson Orchestra With Children From Corona School - 1:41
6. "Romance Theme in F" by Richard Hewson Orchestra - 2:34
7. "Give Your Best" by The Bee Gees - 3:26
8. "To Love Somebody" by The Bee Gees - 2:59
9. "Working on It Night and Day" by Richard Hewson Orchestra With Barry Hewson - 4:06
10. "First of May" by Bee Gees - 2:47
11. "First of May" (Instrumental) by Richard Hewson Orchestra - 0:55
12. "Seaside Banjo" by Richard Hewson Orchestra - 1:05
13. "Teachers Chase" by Richard Hewson Orchestra - 2:23
14. "Teach Your Children" by Crosby, Stills, Nash & Young - 2:53

== Personnel ==
- Barry Gibb - vocals, guitar
- Robin Gibb - vocals
- Maurice Gibb - vocals, bass, piano, guitar
- Geoff Bridgford - drums
- Bill Shepherd - orchestral arrangement
- Lew Hahn - engineer
