= Wouldn't I Be Someone =

Single by Bee Gees
- B-side: "Elisa"; "King and Country" (Germany)
- Released: 22 June 1973 (United Kingdom); July 1973 (United States)
- Recorded: October 1972; The Record Plant, Los Angeles
- Length: 5:31 (album); 3:55 (single)
- Label: RSO
- Songwriter: Barry, Robin & Maurice Gibb
- Producers: Barry Gibb, Robin Gibb, Maurice Gibb

Bee Gees singles chronology
"Saw a New Morning" (1973)	"Wouldn't I Be Someone" (1973)	"Mr. Natural" (1974)

Audio sample
- "Wouldn't I Be Someone": file; help

"Wouldn't I Be Someone" is a song by the Bee Gees. It was released on 22 June 1973 in the United Kingdom and in July 1973 in the United States. The photo on the cover of the single was also used on Best of Bee Gees, Volume 2.

== Background ==
"Wouldn't I Be Someone" was recorded around October 1972 in The Record Plant Studios in Los Angeles. The long chorus, extended by an instrumental section of the song was their new idea and was reminiscent to their 1969 song "Odessa (City on the Black Sea)", but the difference between the two is when electric guitar was added to this song. According to Billboard, the lyrics regard the "dreams of a loser hoping to find himself through love."

== Reception ==
Cash Box said that the song "continues in the same warm and sincere Bee-Gee style that has produced hit after hit for this super talented family of stars." Record World predicted that "This gorgeous item is destined for top ten and add to their gold stock."

Although the single failed to chart in United States, it was a No. 1 hit in Hong Kong and in Costa Rica, and reached No. 17 in Italy. Originally released on Best of Bee Gees, Volume 2 with an extended version timed at 5:31, it was noted for its lush symphony orchestra arrangement and bluesy guitar solo by Alan Kendall. The single was shortened to a running time of 3:30 with the B-side of "Elisa". Both songs had been intended for an album called A Kick in the Head Is Worth Eight in the Pants. Producer Robert Stigwood refused to release the album, citing it as not commercial enough for sales. It was followed by the more R&B flavoured Mr. Natural, produced by legendary Arif Mardin.

Despite the lack of chart success in the US, Billboard praised the song as having many melodic and lyrical hooks.

"Elisa" was chosen as the B-side of this single elsewhere; "King and Country" was chosen only in Germany. The album on which the song originally appeared, A Kick in the Head Is Worth Eight in the Pants, was released as a bootleg in Malaysia on Polydor.

Two days before the Bee Gees' concert in London Palladium in the UK, the song was released as a single on 22 June in that country, but their performance was postponed.

== Personnel ==
- Barry Gibb – lead, harmony and backing vocals, acoustic guitar
- Robin Gibb – lead, harmony and backing vocals
- Maurice Gibb – harmony and backing vocals, bass guitar, piano, acoustic guitar
- Alan Kendall – lead guitar
- Jim Keltner – drums
- Jimmie Haskell – orchestral arrangement

== Chart positions ==
Chart (1973)	Peak position
Australia (Kent Music Report)	52
Hong Kong	1
Italy (Musica e Dischi)	17
US Billboard Hot 100	115
US Billboard Easy Listening Charts	42
US Record World	100
