= Lonely Days =

Single by Bee Gees

from the album 2 Years On
- B-side: "Man for All Seasons"
- Released: 6 November 1970
- Recorded: 21 August 1970
- Studio: IBC Studios, London
- Genre: Chamber pop; orchestral pop; blue-eyed soul
- Length: 3:45
- Label: Polydor; Atco (US/CA)
- Songwriters: Barry Gibb; Robin Gibb; Maurice Gibb
- Producers: Robert Stigwood, Bee Gees

Bee Gees singles chronology
"I.O.I.O." (1970)	"Lonely Days" (1970)	"How Can You Mend a Broken Heart" (1971)

Audio sample
- "Lonely Days": file; help

Music video
- "Lonely Days" on YouTube

"Lonely Days" is a ballad written and performed by the Bee Gees. It appeared on their album 2 Years On, and was released as a single, becoming their first Top Five hit in the US, peaking at number three in the Billboard Hot 100 and reaching number one in the Cashbox and Record World charts. Barry Gibb later re-recorded the song with country quartet Little Big Town for his 2021 album Greenfields.

== Writing and recording ==
The Bee Gees disintegrated throughout 1969 as brother Robin Gibb and drummer Colin Petersen quit the group in succession due to interpersonal conflicts, leaving Barry Gibb and Maurice Gibb as the sole remaining members. Aside from overseeing a few single releases and finishing the television film and accompanying album Cucumber Castle in late 1969, the group were effectively disbanded for the first half of 1970.

On Friday, 21 August 1970, the three Gibb brothers announced they would reunite and start recording together, nearly 16 months after Robin quit the group. They said later that they wrote "Lonely Days" and "How Can You Mend a Broken Heart" at their first reunion session, but the exact day they recorded the song is unknown. However, a tape of stereo mixes received at Atlantic in October bears the notation "August 20, 1970", which, if true, means the brothers announced the reunion the day after it happened. According to Robin Gibb in a 2001 Billboard interview with the Bee Gees, "That was written on Addison Road in Holland Park in London, in the basement of Barry's place."

This song was sung by all three together to Maurice's piano and bass and Bill Shepherd's string and horn arrangement, the slow verses contrasting with the pounding chorus. "'Lonely Days' was written in ten minutes. It was that quick. I was at the piano ten minutes." Barry revealed later in 1998, "A manager we had about five years back heard 'Lonely Days' in a restaurant and he said to a friend, 'That's one of my favorite Beatles songs.' And he was managing us!"

Atlantic Records president Jerry L. Greenberg recalled:

"I heard that song ['Lonely Days'] and I went crazy. I thought it was going to be an amazing number one record. In those days we had our own recording studio, right down the hall from the main offices. Now the record was pressed and ready to go, but what I did was, I made up about 30 tape copies, just put the song on a tape on a regular plastic reel, and I called up a bunch of my promotions department friends."

Greenberg continues:

"I said, 'The Bee Gees just came out of the studio and they cut this record, and I don't even have time to press it up yet, but I wanted you guys to hear it, and I'm going to send you, you're the only one I'm sending, this tape, right from the studio'. I mailed it out special delivery and I have to tell you, within a week, thirty radio stations were all over 'Lonely Days', and it busted the record wide open. I was very proud of that. Ahmet [Ertegun] and Jerry [Wexler] were both talking about it. In those days, you had to come up with some creative ideas, how to promote a record. That record took off!"

== Musical structure ==
"Lonely Days"
An excerpt from the first chorus

The song incorporated the innovative structure and knack for changing tempos exemplified by the second side of The Beatles' Abbey Road album, released the previous year and a clear influence on this single. "Lonely Days" shifts back and forth between a piano-and-strings-dominated verse reminiscent of "You Never Give Me Your Money" and "Golden Slumbers," and an up-tempo stomping chorus that echoes "Carry That Weight"; perhaps as an acknowledgment of the debt, as the record approaches its fade-out, the lead singer's voice is filtered to sound like John Lennon's.

== Release ==
In the United States, Atco released "Lonely Days" on 6 November 1970. As in other territories, "Man for All Seasons", also taken from 2 Years On, featured as the B-side. Atco also issued a promotional single featuring the mono and stereo mixes on the disc's respective sides. A music video of the song was made following the release of the song. The first scene features Maurice playing a Fender Malibu acoustic guitar and sitting next to the window. The second scene features Barry walking his dog in a London park and the third scene features Robin showing loneliness and wanting to go outside driving his car.

The Bee Gees performed "Lonely Days" on The Tonight Show Starring Johnny Carson, The Johnny Cash Show, The Dick Cavett Show and The Ed Sullivan Show. On their performance of this song in The Andy Williams Show, they also performed "Man for All Seasons".

== Reception ==
Cash Box described the song as a "slow building ballad [which] aims at the creation of atmosphere before it breaks into its chant-like body." Record World said that the song "goes through several engrossing changes which should keep listeners (and buyers) on their toes."

== Personnel ==
- Barry Gibb – lead and harmony vocals, acoustic guitar, handclaps
- Robin Gibb – lead, harmony and backing vocals handclaps
- Maurice Gibb – lead, harmony and backing vocals, piano, bass, acoustic guitar, handclaps
- Geoff Bridgford – drums
- Bill Shepherd – orchestra and strings arrangement

== Charts ==
=== Weekly charts ===
Chart (1970–1971)	Peak position
Australia (Go-Set)	8
Austria (Ö3 Austria Top 40)	15
Belgium (Ultratop 50 Flanders)	7
Brazil	2
Canada Top Singles (RPM)	1
Canada Adult Contemporary (RPM)	4
Denmark (Danish Top 40)	3
France (SNEP)	48
Netherlands (Dutch Top 40)	3
New Zealand (Recorded Music NZ)	10
UK (Official Charts Company)	33
US Billboard Hot 100	3
US Adult Contemporary (Billboard)	28
US Cash Box Top 100	1
US Record World Singles	1
West Germany (Media Control Charts)	25

=== Year-end charts ===
Chart (1971)	Position
Australia	57
Belgium (Ultratop 50 Flanders)	23
Canada	24
Netherlands (Dutch Top 40)	29
US Billboard Hot 100	82
US Cash Box Top 100	39
