= Saw a New Morning =

Single by Bee Gees

from the album Life in a Tin Can
- B-side: "My Life Has Been A Song"
- Released: March 1973
- Recorded: September 1972
- Studio: The Record Plant, Los Angeles
- Genre: Symphonic pop
- Length: 4:13
- Label: RSO
- Songwriter: Barry, Robin & Maurice Gibb
- Producers: Barry Gibb, Robin Gibb, Maurice Gibb

Bee Gees singles chronology
"Alive" (1972)	"Saw a New Morning" (1973)	"Wouldn't I Be Someone" (1973)

Audio sample
- "Saw a New Morning": file; help

"Saw a New Morning" is the 1973 single released by the Bee Gees. It was also the group's first single released on Robert Stigwood's newly created record label RSO Records. The Bee Gees moved to Los Angeles in 1972 to record the album Life in a Tin Can which was a new direction for the group, who had been recording in England since 1967. The B-side, "My Life Has Been a Song" features lead vocal by Robin Gibb as well as Barry Gibb.

== Composition and recording ==
This song contains melodic ideas that the group would revisit on the later track "Edge of the Universe".

"Saw a New Morning" was written in 1972 and recorded around September the same year. On the song, Maurice Gibb played the bassline on an electric piano, instead of electric bass. The song also features noted session drummer Jim Keltner. The Bee Gees' touring guitarist, Alan Kendall, who also recorded in the studio with them, plays on this song and its parent album.

== Reception ==
This single was the first and only single from the album; it did not fare well and stalled at #94 in the US, while it did not chart at all in the UK. Ironically, while the single flopped in most of the world, it reached #1 in Hong Kong, as did their next single "Wouldn't I Be Someone", which also flopped in both the US and UK.

In April 1973, they performed the song on The Midnight Special and The Tonight Show Starring Johnny Carson, in addition to a 1973 TV special called Love Sounds Special in Japan.

Billboard commented on the Bee Gees "distinct vocal blend" and the backing instrumentation that "sounds like a symphonic orchestra." Cash Box said that "the accent is on melody and three part harmony as Robin, Barry & Maurice prove that they're still one of the finest vocal groups around." Record World said that "the familiar harmonies and thunderous orchestrations which are keys to this group's success, are right there."

== Personnel ==
Credits from Bee Gees historian and sessionographer Joseph Brennan.

- Barry Gibb — lead, harmony and backing vocals, acoustic guitar
- Robin Gibb — lead, harmony, and backing vocals
- Maurice Gibb — harmony and backing vocals, electric piano, acoustic guitar
- Alan Kendall — acoustic guitar
- Jim Keltner — drums
- Johnny Pate — orchestral arrangement

== Charts ==
=== Weekly charts ===
Chart (1973)	Peak position
Australia (Go-Set)	32
Australia (Kent Music Report)	38
Canada Adult Contemporary (RPM)	51
Hong Kong	1
Italy (Musica e Dischi)	20
US Billboard Hot 100	94
US Cash Box	78
US Record World	69

=== Year-end charts ===
Chart (1973)	Position
Hong Kong	10
