= Life in a Tin Can =

Studio album by the Bee Gees
- Released: 19 January 1973
- Recorded: September 1972
- Studio: Record Plant (Los Angeles)
- Genre: Soft rock; folk pop; country rock
- Length: 32:11
- Label: RSO
- Producer: Bee Gees

The Bee Gees chronology
To Whom It May Concern (1972)	Life in a Tin Can (1973)	Mr. Natural (1974)

Singles from Life in a Tin Can
- 1. "Saw a New Morning" Released: March 1973

Professional ratings
Review scores
Source	Rating
AllMusic	2/5 stars
The Encyclopedia of Popular Music	2/5 stars
The Rolling Stone Album Guide	1.5/5 stars

Life in a Tin Can is the Bee Gees' eleventh studio album (ninth worldwide), released in January 1973 in the US and in March 1973 in the UK.

== Background ==
The Bee Gees travelled to Los Angeles to record Life in a Tin Can. However, it was unable to prevent a commercial decline, with the album criticised for a lack of innovation. Despite its low sales and poor chart performance, Life in a Tin Can was awarded "Album of the Year" by Record World magazine. It was the first Bee Gees album to bear the RSO label in the US.

Four of the eight songs were written by all three brothers, with the other four being Barry Gibb compositions. "Saw a New Morning" was a No. 1 hit in Hong Kong. During the sessions, Robin Gibb had to leave the sessions suddenly when his son Spencer was born a month early. He returned to Los Angeles a week or so later to continue on into the next album. The other musicians who participated on Life in a Tin Can were Jim Keltner, Sneaky Pete Kleinow, Tommy Morgan, Jerome Richardson, Ric Grech, Jane Getz and Johnny Pate.

When asked by Billboard why they moved from London to Los Angeles, Maurice said: "We don't want to talk about it yet. But we're going to attempt a concept album that's a major departure from our usual Bee Gees trademarks. And if that doesn't work out, we'll do something else".

== Critical reception ==
Rolling Stone called the album "vaguely pleasant and certainly innocuous enough to fit right in with the prevalent Seventies soft-rock ambience."

== Track listing ==
All tracks written and composed by Barry, Robin and Maurice Gibb, except for songs with asterisks, which are by Barry Gibb.

Side one
No.	Title	Writer(s)	Lead vocals	Length
1.	"Saw a New Morning"		Barry and Robin	4:24
2.	"I Don't Wanna Be the One"	*	Robin and Barry	4:05
3.	"South Dakota Morning"	*	Barry	2:26
4.	"Living in Chicago"		Barry, Robin and Maurice	5:43

Side two
No.	Title	Writer(s)	Lead vocals	Length
1.	"While I Play"	*	Barry	4:29
2.	"My Life Has Been a Song"		Robin and Barry	4:21
3.	"Come Home Johnny Bridie"	*	Barry	3:50
4.	"Method to My Madness"		Barry and Robin	3:10

== Personnel ==
Credits from historian and sessionographer Joseph Brennan.

Bee Gees

- Barry Gibb – lead vocals, harmony and backing vocals, rhythm guitar
- Robin Gibb – lead, harmony, and backing vocals
- Maurice Gibb – harmony and backing vocals, bass guitar (except "Saw a New Morning" and "While I Play"), rhythm guitar, piano, keyboards

Additional musicians

- Alan Kendall – lead guitar
- Jim Keltner – drums
- Sneaky Pete Kleinow – lap steel guitar on "South Dakota Morning" and "Come Home Johnny Bridie"
- Tommy Morgan – harmonica on "South Dakota Morning" and "My Life Has Been a Song"
- Jerome Richardson – flute on "Living in Chicago"
- Rick Grech – violin and bass guitar on "While I Play"
- Jane Getz – piano on "Come Home Johnny Bridie"
- Johnny Pate – orchestral arrangement

Production

- Bee Gees – producer
- Mike D. Stone – engineer of the Record Plant in Los Angeles, California
- Chuck Leary – engineer

== Chart performance ==
Album

Chart (1973)	Peak position
Australia Kent Music Report Albums Chart	19
Canadian RPM Albums Chart	54
Italian Albums Chart	10
US Billboard 200	69

Singles

Billboard charts (North America)
Year	Song	Chart	Rank
1973	"Saw a New Morning"	Billboard Hot 100	94
