= 2 Years On =

Studio album by the Bee Gees
- Released: November 1970
- Recorded: 13 June – 5 October 1970
- Studio: IBC (London)
- Genre: Pop rock
- Length: 35:57
- Label: Polydor (United Kingdom); Atco (United States); Spin (Australia, New Zealand)
- Producer: Robert Stigwood, Bee Gees

The Bee Gees chronology
Cucumber Castle (1970)	2 Years On (1970)	Trafalgar (1971)

Australasian cover
- 2 Years On album released on Spin Records only in Australia and New Zealand.

Singles from 2 Years On
- 1. "Lonely Days" Released: 6 November 1970

Professional ratings
Review scores
Source	Rating
AllMusic	4/5 stars
Christgau's Record Guide	C−
The Rolling Stone Album Guide	1.5/5 stars

2 Years On is the eighth studio album by the Bee Gees, released in 1970. The album saw the return of Robin Gibb to the group after an earlier disagreement and subsequent split following Odessa. 2 Years On was the first album with drummer Geoff Bridgford, who remained a full-time member of the group until 1972 although he was not pictured on the sleeve. The best-known track is "Lonely Days" which was released as the album's first single. It charted high in the US (No. 3 on the Billboard Hot 100 and No. 1 on the rival chart Cashbox), but only reached No. 33 in the United Kingdom. The album reached No. 32 on the US charts.

== Background ==
In March 1969, Robin announced that he was leaving the band. In June, he released his debut solo single "Saved by the Bell", which reached No. 2 on the UK charts. In August, drummer Colin Petersen was fired and was replaced by Terry Cox to complete the album Cucumber Castle. Before the album was released, Barry and Maurice announced that the Bee Gees had split in December 1969. The pair released singles, "Railroad" by Maurice and "I'll Kiss Your Memory" by Barry, but their respective albums The Loner and The Kid's No Good remain unreleased to this day. During the temporary break-up of the group, Maurice appeared in London musical theatre production Sing a Rude Song. Maurice recalls: "We got fed up with all the lawyers fighting over our assets, so we walked out of this big summit meeting and started the group again".

=== Recording ===
Robin and Maurice reunited in June 1970, supported by new drummer Geoff Bridgford. They recorded four songs, including "Sincere Relation" and "Lay It on Me". "We Can Lift a Mountain" was also re-recorded, a song from 1968. After that, Maurice joined the supergroup The Bloomfields with Billy Lawrie, and worked with Tin Tin. In August, Maurice and Robin announced that the Bee Gees were back, with or without Barry's participation, and fourteen songs were recorded, including "Back Home" and "I'm Weeping". On 21 August, the three Bee Gees came together to continue recording as Barry announced, "The Bee Gees are there and they will never, ever part again". He continues, "If a solo record comes out, it will be with enthusiasm and great support of each of us. We are a musical establishment". Maurice, on the other hand, recalled: "We just discussed it and re-formed".

=== Release ===
Around the same time, Barry's "One Bad Thing" / "The Day Your Eyes Meet Mine" was withdrawn at the last minute in the US for single release, while Polydor planned to release "One Bad Thing" as a single by 2 October (probably in Europe and Asia). Despite Barry's longing to prove himself as a solo artist, it was decided instead that the next single should be performed by the Bee Gees as they reunited around the same time.

Despite the album marking the musical reunion of the Bee Gees, only three songs credited all three Gibb brothers as composers: the single "Lonely Days", its flip side "Man For All Seasons", and "Back Home". Maurice sings on all songs, but Barry and Robin are only on the ones they wrote or co-wrote. In the August sessions, they also recorded "You Got to Lose It in the End", "Little Red Train", "Sweet Summer Rain", "Melody Fair" (originally released on Odessa) and "Maybe Tomorrow". None of these were released.

== Track listing ==
Side one
No.	Title	Writer(s)	Lead vocal(s)	Length
1.	"2 Years On"	Robin Gibb, Maurice Gibb	Robin	3:57
2.	"Portrait of Louise"	Barry Gibb	Barry	2:35
3.	"Man For All Seasons"	Barry Gibb, Robin Gibb, Maurice Gibb	Barry, Robin & Maurice	2:59
4.	"Sincere Relation"	Robin Gibb, Maurice Gibb	Robin	2:46
5.	"Back Home"	Barry Gibb, Robin Gibb, Maurice Gibb	Barry, Robin & Maurice	1:52
6.	"The 1st Mistake I Made"	Barry Gibb	Barry	4:03

Side two
No.	Title	Writer(s)	Lead vocal(s)	Length
1.	"Lonely Days"	Barry Gibb, Robin Gibb, Maurice Gibb	Barry, Robin & Maurice	3:45
2.	"Alone Again"	Robin Gibb	Robin	3:00
3.	"Tell Me Why"	Barry Gibb	Barry	3:13
4.	"Lay It on Me"	Maurice Gibb	Maurice	2:07
5.	"Every Second, Every Minute"	Barry Gibb	Barry	3:01
6.	"I'm Weeping"	Robin Gibb	Robin	2:45

=== Alternate track listing ===
Side one
No.	Title	Length
1.	"2 Years On"	3:57
2.	"Lonely Days"	3:45
3.	"Lay It on Me"	2:07
4.	"Portrait of Louise"	2:35
5.	"Man For All Seasons"	2:59
6.	"The First Mistake I Made"	4:03

Side two
No.	Title	Length
1.	"I'm Weeping"	2:45
2.	"Every Second, Every Minute"	3:01
3.	"Sincere Relation"	2:46
4.	"Back Home"	1:52
5.	"Alone Again"	3:00
6.	"Tell Me Why"	3:13

== Personnel ==
Credits from Joseph Brennan.

Bee Gees

- Barry Gibb – lead, harmony, and backing vocals; rhythm guitar
- Robin Gibb – lead, harmony, and backing vocals; organ on "I'm Weeping"
- Maurice Gibb – harmony and backing vocals, bass guitar, lead and rhythm guitars, piano, lead vocals on "Lay It On Me"

Additional musicians and production staff

- Geoff Bridgford – drums
- Bill Shepherd, Gerry Shury – orchestral arrangement
- John Stewart – engineer
- Robert Stigwood – producer
- Bee Gees – producers

== Charts ==
Chart	Position
Australia Kent Music Report Albums Chart	22
Canadian RPM Albums Chart	22
US Billboard 200	32
US Cashbox	14
