= Mr. Natural (Bee Gees album) =

Studio album by the Bee Gees
- Released: May 1974
- Recorded: 14 November 1973 – 28 January 1974
- Studios: IBC (London); Command (London); Atlantic (New York)
- Genres: Soul; soft rock; R&B
- Length: 45:26
- Label: RSO
- Producer: Arif Mardin

The Bee Gees chronology
| Life in a Tin Can (1973) | Mr. Natural (1974) | Main Course (1975) |

Singles from Mr. Natural
- 1. "Mr. Natural" Released: 29 March 1974; 2. "Throw a Penny" Released: June 1974 (US); 3. "Charade" Released: August 1974

Mr. Natural is the twelfth studio album (tenth internationally) by the Bee Gees, released in 1974. It was the first Bee Gees release produced by Arif Mardin, who was partially responsible for launching the group's later major success with the follow-up album Main Course. The album's rhythm and blues, soul, funk, and hard rock sounds initiated the group's reinvention as a disco and blue-eyed soul act, which would solidify on subsequent albums. However, Barry Gibb has said that the album was "whiter" than Main Course. The cover photograph was taken at 334 West 4th Street, Greenwich Village, New York City by Frank Moscati, which is today known as The Corner Bistro tavern.

The LP was the Bee Gees' poorest charting album at the time, reaching No. 178 on the Billboard 200, but failing to chart elsewhere, including in Europe where the group had previously enjoyed their most consistent popularity. However, it was a moderate success in the group's adopted home of Australia where it reached No. 20.

== Background ==
The decision to work with Mardin came after the RSO label rejected the brothers' post-Life in a Tin Can album, which had been provisionally entitled A Kick in the Head Is Worth Eight in the Pants. Robert Stigwood was not ready to give up on the Bee Gees, but he did not believe in the musical direction they were taking. At the suggestion of Jerry Wexler and Ahmet Ertegun of Atlantic, Stigwood sent them to work with Atlantic producer and arranger Arif Mardin, who began to draw out their love of rhythm and blues music. Mardin brought the band's attention to the dance scene unfolding at the time and the brothers Gibb in turn adapted their songwriting and arrangements to a more upbeat style.

== Recording ==
Recording began in November 1973 and although they were self-conscious about doing a really black sound, their first goal was to record songs in a way that they could reproduce on stage. They made more use of Alan Kendall's lead guitar and added a keyboardist, which resulted in less recording for Maurice who had long overdubbed many instrumental and backing vocal parts; he would now focus almost exclusively on playing bass and singing backing vocals during the trio's R&B/disco era. The new sound was more electric than much of what they had done since regrouping in 1970.

With Mardin at the helm, the Bee Gees returned to IBC Studios in London where they had recorded much of their pre-Life in a Tin Can output. The first two songs recorded were harder rock ("Heavy Breathing" and "I Can't Let You Go"), both written in Los Angeles. This was a deliberate attempt to record a new sound compared to the acoustic sounds found on Life in a Tin Can. There were also two new backing musicians: Dennis Bryon on drums and Geoff Westley on keyboards who were in the tour band now made their debut with the Bee Gees on disc. Bryon was a friend of Kendall and would be the Bee Gees' drummer until 1980. The big change here was having Westley or in fact anyone play most of the piano and keyboard parts that had been Maurice's domain for years. Westley would soon be replaced as keyboardist by ex-Strawbs keyboardist Derek "Blue" Weaver whom Bryon had played with in Amen Corner.

Around this time, Maurice's problems with alcohol began to surface; although he wrote few songs in 1974, he never missed a show or a recording session, but on this album most of the new songs were written by Barry and Robin only. Three songs were written by all three brothers; additionally, "Lost in Your Love" was a solo Barry composition, while "Give A Hand, Take A Hand" was a Barry/Maurice composition. The songs "Mr. Natural" and "Had a Lot of Love Last Night" were recorded and completed at the Command Studios in London. The songs "Give a Hand, Take a Hand" and "Lost in Your Love" were recorded at Atlantic Studios in 1974. Maurice said in an interview with Lynn Redgrave that his alcoholism didn't affect his recording sessions and concerts until around the time of Spirits Having Flown.

"When we did Mr. Natural, we didn't have a positive direction", Maurice said, "We were thrashing about". In an interview with the Bee Gees for Billboard on 24 March 2001, Maurice recalls about producer Arif Mardin, "Arif was brilliant, full of ideas. That's why we did the Mr. Natural album with him, which was like a rehearsal".

The gospel-tinged song "Give a Hand, Take a Hand" had been written in 1969 (hence Robin's lack of writing credit since he wasn't working with his brothers at the time) and originally recorded for their 1970 album Cucumber Castle, but was not released and was used by P. P. Arnold; her version was released in September 1969 as a single, which was produced by Barry Gibb. The Staple Singers also covered "Give a Hand, Take a Hand"; their version was released on their 1971 album The Staple Swingers.

== Reception ==
Professional ratings
Review scores
| Source | Rating |
|---|---|
| AllMusic | 4.0/5 stars |
| Rolling Stone | (not rated) |
| The Rolling Stone Album Guide | 1.5/5 stars |

In a retrospective review, Bruce Eder of AllMusic said it was the "sultriest and most soulful record" from the group. He added that Mr. Natural was the "liveliest, most invigorating body of music to come from the group." He noted the "extraordinary sensuality" of the songs "Charade" and "Had a Lot of Love Last Night." At the end of his review, Eder concluded the although album generated had no hits, it was their best album since Odessa.

== Track listing ==
Side one
| No. | Title | Writer(s) | Lead vocal(s) | Length |
|---|---|---|---|---|
| 1. | "Charade" | Barry Gibb, Robin Gibb | Barry and Robin | 4:13 |
| 2. | "Throw a Penny" | Barry Gibb, Robin Gibb | Barry and Robin | 4:54 |
| 3. | "Down the Road" | Barry Gibb, Robin Gibb | Barry | 3:35 |
| 4. | "Voices" | Barry Gibb, Robin Gibb, Maurice Gibb | Robin and Barry | 4:50 |
| 5. | "Give a Hand, Take a Hand" | Barry Gibb, Maurice Gibb | Barry | 4:44 |

Side two
| No. | Title | Writer(s) | Lead vocal(s) | Length |
|---|---|---|---|---|
| 1. | "Dogs" | Barry Gibb, Robin Gibb | Barry | 3:43 |
| 2. | "Mr. Natural" | Barry Gibb, Robin Gibb | Robin and Barry | 3:46 |
| 3. | "Lost in Your Love" | Barry Gibb | Barry | 4:36 |
| 4. | "I Can't Let You Go" | Barry Gibb, Robin Gibb, Maurice Gibb | Barry | 3:45 |
| 5. | "Heavy Breathing" | Barry Gibb, Robin Gibb | Barry and Robin | 3:26 |
| 6. | "Had a Lot of Love Last Night" | Barry Gibb, Robin Gibb, Maurice Gibb | Barry | 4:07 |

== Personnel ==
Credits from Bee Gees historian and sessionographer Joseph Brennan.

Bee Gees

- Barry Gibb – lead, harmony and backing vocals; rhythm guitar
- Robin Gibb – lead, harmony and backing vocals
- Maurice Gibb – harmony and backing vocals, bass guitar (except “Had a Lot of Love Last Night”), Mellotron, Hammond organ

Additional musicians

- Alan Kendall – lead guitar
- Dennis Bryon – drums, percussion
- Geoff Westley – piano, keyboards
- Ben Law – fretless bass on "Had a Lot of Love Last Night"
- Phil Bodner – clarinet on "Charade"
- Arif Mardin – orchestral arrangement

Production

- Damon Lyon-Shaw – engineer
- Andy Knight, Alan Lucas, Gene Paul – engineer
- Arif Mardin – producer

== Chart positions ==
| Chart (1974) | Peak position |
|---|---|
| Australian Albums Chart | 20 |
| US Billboard 200 | 178 |
