= The Very Best of the Bee Gees =

Compilation album by Bee Gees
- Released: 20 November 1990
- Recorded: 1967–1989
- Genre: Pop, disco
- Length: 76:25
- Label: Polydor, PolyGram

Bee Gees chronology
One (1989)	The Very Best of the Bee Gees (1990)	High Civilization (1991)

Professional ratings
Review scores
Source	Rating
AllMusic	4/5 stars
New Musical Express	8/10

The Very Best of the Bee Gees is a greatest hits album by British/Australian pop group the Bee Gees. It was originally released on 20 November 1990 by Polydor Records, around the time as the Tales from the Brothers Gibb box set. The album was primarily aimed at the European market, as shown by the exclusion of the US hits "Holiday", "I Started a Joke", "Lonely Days", "How Can You Mend a Broken Heart" and "Fanny (Be Tender with My Love)".

The album has been re-issued several times, including a 1996 version which dropped "You Win Again" and "Ordinary Lives" from the track listing. On the other hand, the version released in Hong Kong omitted two tracks and instead added "Melody Fair" which was not included in the original release.

== Track listing ==
All tracks are written by Barry Gibb, Maurice Gibb, and Robin Gibb; except where noted.

No.	Title	Original album and year	Length
1.	"New York Mining Disaster 1941" (B. Gibb, R. Gibb)	Bee Gees' 1st, August 1967	2:11
2.	"To Love Somebody" (B. Gibb, R. Gibb)	Bee Gees' 1st	3:01
3.	"Massachusetts"	Horizontal, February 1968	2:23
4.	"World"	Horizontal	3:14
5.	"Words"	Best of Bee Gees, June 1969	3:15
6.	"I've Gotta Get a Message to You"	UK: Single only, September 1968; US: Idea, September 1968	3:07
7.	"First of May"	Odessa, March 1969	2:48
8.	"Don't Forget to Remember" (B. Gibb, M. Gibb)	Cucumber Castle, April 1970	3:28
9.	"Saved by the Bell" (R. Gibb)	Robin's Reign -- Robin Gibb solo album, February 1970	3:06
10.	"Run to Me"	To Whom It May Concern, October 1972	3:06
11.	"Jive Talkin'"	Main Course, June 1975	3:43
12.	"Nights on Broadway"	Main Course	4:26
13.	"You Should Be Dancing"	Children of the World, September 1976	4:46
14.	"How Deep Is Your Love"	Saturday Night Fever Soundtrack, November 1977	4:02
15.	"More Than A Woman"	Saturday Night Fever Soundtrack	3:15
16.	"Stayin' Alive"	Saturday Night Fever Soundtrack	4:42
17.	"Night Fever"	Saturday Night Fever Soundtrack	3:30
18.	"Too Much Heaven"	Spirits Having Flown, February 1979	4:56
19.	"Tragedy"	Spirits Having Flown	5:02
20.	"You Win Again"	E·S·P, September 1987	3:57
21.	"Ordinary Lives"	One, July 1989	4:05

== Charts ==
=== Weekly ===
Chart (1991–2001)	Peak position
Australian Albums (ARIA)	7
Austrian Albums (Ö3 Austria)	9
Belgian Albums (Ultratop Flanders)	23
Belgian Albums (Ultratop Wallonia)	19
Canadian Albums (RPM)	42
Dutch Albums (Album Top 100)	8
European Albums (Music & Media)	10
German Albums (Offizielle Top 100)	9
New Zealand Albums (RMNZ)	5
UK Albums (OCC)	8

=== Year-end ===
Chart (1991)	Position
Dutch Albums (Album Top 100)	99
German Albums (Offizielle Top 100)	23

Chart (1994)	Position
Australian Albums (ARIA)	61

Chart (1997)	Position
Belgian Albums (Ultratop Flanders)	99
Belgian Albums (Ultratop Wallonia)	98
Dutch Albums (Album Top 100)	67
German Albums (Offizielle Top 100)	62
New Zealand Albums (RMNZ)	30

== Certifications and sales ==
Region	Certification	Certified units/sales
Argentina (CAPIF)	Platinum	60,000^{^}
Australia (ARIA)	Gold	35,000^{^}
Austria (IFPI Austria)	Gold	25,000^{*}
Germany (BVMI)	2× Platinum	1,000,000^{^}
Italy	—	350,000
Netherlands (NVPI)	2× Platinum	200,000^{^}
New Zealand (RMNZ)	Platinum	15,000^{^}
Poland (ZPAV)	Gold	50,000^{*}
Switzerland (IFPI Switzerland)	Platinum	50,000^{^}
United Kingdom (BPI)	3× Platinum	900,000^{^}
^{*} Sales figures based on certification alone.^{^} Shipments figures based on certification alone.
