= Statue of Bee Gees =

Statue of Bee Gees may refer to:

- Statue of Bee Gees (Douglas, Isle of Man)
- Statue of Bee Gees (Redcliffe, Queensland)
