= Kitty Can (album) =

Compilation album by Bee Gees
- Released: 1973 (South America)
- Recorded: 1967–1973
- Genre: Psychedelic rock, psychedelic pop, baroque pop
- Label: RSO
- Producer: Robert Stigwood, Bee Gees

Bee Gees compilations chronology
Best of Bee Gees, Volume 2 (1973)	Kitty Can (1973)	I've Gotta Get a Message to You (1974)

Kitty Can is a compilation album by the Bee Gees, released only in South America on RSO Records.

This was the first LP appearance of Bee Gees' "Jumbo", Maurice Gibb's "I've Come Back", Barry Gibb's "This Time" and the Bee Gees' "Country Woman". The version of "Wouldn't I Be Someone" on this album was an early-fade single.

== Track listing ==
- All tracks written by Barry, Robin & Maurice Gibb, except where noted.

Side two

1. "Kitty Can" — 2:31
2. "Railroad" (Maurice Gibb) — 3:37
3. "Barker of the UFO" (Barry Gibb) — 1:48
4. "I'll Kiss Your Memory" (Barry Gibb) — 4:26
5. "Country Woman" (Maurice Gibb) — 2:48
6. "One Million Years" (Robin Gibb) — 4:05
7. "On Time" (Maurice Gibb) — 3:00

Side two

1. "The Singer Sang His Song" — 3:07
2. "Jumbo" — 2:07
3. "Sinking Ships" — 2:21
4. "I've Come Back" (Maurice Gibb) — 2:40
5. "August October" (Robin Gibb) — 2:31
6. "Wouldn't I Be Someone" — 5:39
7. "This Time" (Barry Gibb) — 3:24
