= We Lost the Road =

Song by Bee Gees

from the album To Whom It May Concern
- Released: October 1972
- Recorded: 28 January 1971
- Studio: IBC Studios, London
- Length: 3:27
- Label: Polydor Records (UK); Atco Records (US)
- Songwriters: Barry Gibb, Robin Gibb
- Producers: Robert Stigwood, Bee Gees

"We Lost the Road" is a song by the Bee Gees. It was written by Barry Gibb and Robin Gibb and was released on their 1972 album To Whom It May Concern.

It was originally recorded in sessions for Trafalgar on January 28, 1971 (and the first song recorded for the album). Lead vocals are by Barry, with the lyrics of verse 3 before verse 2. It is likely that many other songs had alternate vocal tracks that were replaced, most of which are totally gone now unless they survived on acetates or rough mix tapes, but it was dropped from the album. This track was re-recorded with lead vocals by Barry and Robin, and that version was released in 1972.

== Personnel ==
- Barry Gibb - vocals, guitar
- Robin Gibb - vocals
- Maurice Gibb - bass, piano, guitar, organ, harmony vocals
- Alan Kendall - guitar
- Geoff Bridgford - drums
