= Mythology Tour =

2013–14 concert tour by Barry Gibb

- World tour by Barry Gibb
- Associated album: Mythology
- Start date: 8 February 2013
- End date: 4 June 2014
- Legs: 3
- No. of shows: 6 in Oceania; 4 in Europe; 6 in North America; 16 in Total

The Mythology Tour is the first solo tour by British rock musician and singer-songwriter Barry Gibb formerly of the Bee Gees. It took its name from the Bee Gees' box set of the same name.

== Background ==
Gibb designed this tour in October 2012 as a celebration of his brothers Robin and Maurice. Gibb commented about the tour: "I am absolutely thrilled that Australian music lovers have embraced the Mythology Tour so wholeheartedly, given that it's the country where it all began. I am truly humbled by this response and can’t wait to perform these songs again on home soil.

This tour features his son Steve with Maurice's daughter, Samantha. As Gibb told Sydney Morning Herald: "As the place where we started so many years ago, we have always viewed Australia as our home so it is only fitting that we will be kicking off our Mythology tour there". By 5 October 2012, tickets for the tour were planned to go on sale. The tour began on 8 February 2013 with Gibb's concert at the Sydney Entertainment Centre in Sydney.

While Gibb performed "Spicks and Specks", there was a mini documentary shown on the video screen. Maurice's daughter, Samantha joined the band to sing "How Can You Mend a Broken Heart". Barry Gibb sang "I Started a Joke" for the first time with Robin singing the rest of the song on the video screen with the band.

In April 2013, Gibb announced his first solo UK tour and that he would play five dates in the United Kingdom and Ireland between 21 September and 3 October. The UK leg of the Mythology tour was promoted by Stuart Galbraith of Kilimanjaro Live. The US leg of the tour started in Boston in May 2014.

== Setlist (Australian Leg) ==
Setlist
1. "Technicolor Dreams" (music video, except on 27 February)
2. "Jive Talkin'"
3. "Lonely Days"
4. "You Should Be Dancing"
5. "First of May"
6. "To Love Somebody"
7. "How Can You Mend a Broken Heart"
8. "Fever/Stayin' Alive"
9. "How Deep Is Your Love"
10. "On Time"
11. "The Long and Winding Road"
12. "I've Gotta Get a Message to You"
13. "Kilburn Towers"
14. "Playdown"
15. "Spicks and Specks"
16. "With the Sun in My Eyes"
17. "In the Morning"
18. "Every Christian Lion Hearted Man Will Show You"
19. "I Started a Joke"
20. "Islands in the Stream"
21. "Guilty"
22. "Words"
23. "Night Fever / More Than a Woman"
24. "Ordinary Lives"
25. "Immortality"
26. "Stayin' Alive" (encore)

Notes

- The show of 23 February in New Zealand titled 'Mission Estate Concert' on which the Wellington International Ukulele Orchestra and Carole King are special guests.

== Tour dates ==
Date	City	Country	Venue	Reviews
Oceania
8 February 2013	Sydney	Australia	Sydney Entertainment Centre	The AU Review
12 February 2013	Melbourne	Australia	Rod Laver Arena	Take40
16 February 2013	Brisbane	Australia	Brisbane Entertainment Centre	Brisbane Times
19 February 2013	Brisbane	Australia	Brisbane Entertainment Centre	Brisbane Times
23 February 2013^{[A]}	Hawkes Bay	New Zealand	Mission Estate Winery	The New Zealand Herald
27 February 2013	Sydney	Australia	Sydney Entertainment Centre	
Europe
21 September 2013	Birmingham	England	LG Arena	The Guardian
25 September 2013	Dublin	Ireland	The O_{2}	Golden Plec
29 September 2013	Manchester	England	Phones 4u Arena	Manchester Evening News
3 October 2013	London	England	The O2	The Telegraph
North America
15 May 2014	Boston	United States	TD Garden	Boston Herald
19 May 2014	Philadelphia	United States	Wells Fargo Center	Live Rock Journal
23 May 2014	Wantagh	United States	Nikon at Jones Beach Theater	Newsday
27 May 2014	Chicago	United States	United Center	Chicage Sun-Times
31 May 2014	Concord	United States	Sleep Train Pavilion	The Examiner
4 June 2014	Los Angeles	United States	Hollywood Bowl	The Hollywood Reporter

Festivals and other miscellaneous performances
^{A} This concert was part of the "Mission Estate Winery Concert"

== Tour band ==
- Barry Gibb – lead vocal, guitar
- Steve Gibb – guitar, lead vocals on "Fight The Good Fight", "On Time" and "I've Gotta Get a Message to You" (first verse)
- Samantha Gibb – harmony vocals on "How Can You Mend a Broken Heart" and "Run to Me", and lead vocals on "Chain Reaction" and "If I Can't Have You"
- Richard Bravo – percussion
- Tim Cansfield – guitar
- Beth Cohen – lead and backing vocals
- Doug Emery – keyboards, backing vocals
- Julio Hernandez – bass guitar
- Lee Levin – drums
- Charlotte McKinnon – backing vocals
- Leesa Richards – backing vocals
- Ben Stivers – keyboards
- Dan Warner – lead guitar, backing vocals
- John Merchant – Sound Engineer
- Joe Lizano – Barry's guitar technician
- Lazaro Rodríguez – Stephen's guitar technician
