= My World (Bee Gees song) =

Single by Bee Gees
- B-side: "On Time"
- Released: 14 January 1972
- Recorded: 13 October 1971
- Studio: IBC Studios, London
- Genre: Pop
- Length: 4:20
- Label: Polydor, Philips (UK); Atco (US/CA)
- Songwriters: Barry Gibb, Robin Gibb
- Producers: Robert Stigwood, Bee Gees

Bee Gees singles chronology
| "Don't Wanna Live Inside Myself" (1971) | "My World" (1972) | "Run to Me" (1972) |

Audio sample
- "My World": file; help

"My World" is a 1972 single released by the Bee Gees. It was originally released as a non-album single on 14 January 1972 worldwide. but was later included on the compilation Best of Bee Gees, Volume 2 in 1973. The flip side of the single was "On Time", a country rock number composed by Maurice Gibb. "My World" reached the Top 20 in both US and UK.

== Writing and recording ==
"My World" was written in the backstage of ITV's The Golden Shot with some of the same musical ideas as "How Can You Mend a Broken Heart". Maurice said "Whether something is a soft ballad or an uptempo thing, we would record it if we thought it was going to make a good single". By October 13, the band recorded had "My World" along with unreleased tracks, "What Could Have Been Done" and "Goodbye Blue Sky". The song is played through twice. Barry Gibb explained that "My World" was "not from the album", referring to their current album Trafalgar. As Robin Gibb states in the liner notes of Tales from the Brothers Gibb, "One rollicking little jaunt that me and the lads came up with in downtown Birmingham, England, whilst doing a television show called Golden Shot, the ensuing results being that it went on to be a huge top 20 hit in the UK and the US that left the three of us 'drooling' with pleasure."

Record World said that the song "builds over so carefully with haunting refrain."

It was the last single released by the band with drummer Geoff Bridgford on the cover. He left soon after but did also feature on the next but one single Alive.

== Release ==
The music video featured the group in a recording studio. Barry Gibb was shown without his trademark beard, like he does in the group's later videos for "Night Fever" and the alternate videos of "How Deep Is Your Love" and "Stayin' Alive" as well as the video for his 1984 solo single "Fine Line".

"My World" also reached #15 in Cash Box in two weeks.

== Personnel ==
- Barry Gibb – lead vocal, guitar
- Robin Gibb – lead vocal
- Maurice Gibb – backing vocal, bass, piano, guitar
- Geoff Bridgford – drums
- Alan Kendall – guitar

== Chart performance ==
| Chart (1972) | Peak position |
|---|---|
| Argentina | 6 |
| Australia (Kent Music Report) | 3 |
| Belgium (Ultratop 50 Flanders) | 15 |
| Brazil | 5 |
| Canada (RPM) | 11 |
| Denmark (Danish Top 40) | 8 |
| Germany (Media Control Charts) | 41 |
| Hong Kong | 1 |
| Italy (FIMI) | 1 |
| Ireland (IRMA) | 14 |
| Japan (Oricon) | 27 |
| Netherlands (Dutch Top 40) | 9 |
| New Zealand (RIANZ Charts) | 9 |
| Spain (PROMUSICAE) | 4 |
| UK (Official Charts Company) | 16 |
| US Billboard Hot 100 | 16 |
| US Cash Box | 15 |
| US Record World | 15 |

=== Year-end charts ===
| Chart (1972) | Position |
|---|---|
| Australia | 29 |
| Belgium (Ultratop 50) | 26 |
| Netherlands (Dutch Top 40) | 26 |
