= Israel (Bee Gees song) =

- Official single cover for "Israel" (1972)

Single by Bee Gees

from the album Trafalgar
- B-side: "Dearest"
- Released: May 1972 (Belgium)
- Recorded: 7 April 1971
- Genre: Pop
- Length: 3:54
- Label: Polydor; Atco (United States/Canada)
- Songwriter: Barry Gibb
- Producers: Robert Stigwood, Bee Gees

"Israel" is a ballad track written by Barry Gibb. It appeared on the Bee Gees' 1971 album, Trafalgar.

Gibb said of writing the song: "I wrote this as a tribute; a dedication to the country. The whole lyric was ad-libbed, as no words were written down. I just sang what came into my head after I got the tune."

It was recorded on 7 April 1971 at the IBC Studios in London, along with the two Maurice Gibb compositions, "Trafalgar" and "It's Just the Way", the Robin Gibb composition "Engines, Aeroplanes", and another Barry Gibb composition, the ballad "Don't Wanna Live Inside Myself".

"Israel" was released as a single in May 1972 in Belgium, in the Netherlands, where it reached No. 22, and in New Zealand. "Dearest" was chosen as the B-side.

Seth Rogovoy interpreted "Israel" for The Forward as a "love song to Israel", noting that Gibb played it onstage during a trip to Israel in 1972. Lubbock Avalanche-Journal critic Jon Clemens also interpreted it as a love song to Israel, citing lyrics such as "Take me into your arms/Let me be with you Israel". Clemens went on to say that "this is done in a sort of old-style rhythm and blues style vocal, half-song half-spoken with a strong piano backing – and lots of violins, of course – and believe it or not, it all works." Capital Journal critic Steve Gettinger felt that as a "song to a country", it is enough off the beaten path" to "overcome a soggy arrangement and emerge as a viable tune." Winston-Salem Journal critic Jim Shertzer similarly called it an "off-beat number" that is a "love song to a people and a nation".

== Personnel ==
- Barry Gibb — lead and backing vocals, acoustic guitar
- Maurice Gibb — piano, bass and acoustic guitar
- Geoff Bridgford — drums
- Bill Shepherd — orchestral arrangement
