= Selle v. Gibb =

- Court: United States Court of Appeals for the Seventh Circuit
- Full case name: Ronald H. Selle v. Barry Gibb, Robin Gibb, and Maurice Gibb, A/K/A The Bee Gees, Brothers Gibb B.V., Phonodisc, Inc.(Polygram Distribution, Inc.,) and Paramount Pictures Corp.
- Argued: 13 April 1984
- Decided: 23 July 1984
- Citation: 741 F.2d 896

Court membership
- Judges sitting: Wood and Cudahy, Circuit Judges, and Nichols, Senior Circuit Judge

Case opinions
- The doctrine of striking similarities is not enough in the absence of proof of access. Evidence of access must extend beyond mere speculation.

Keywords
- Substantial similarity

Selle v. Gibb, 741 F.2d 896 (7th Cir. 1984) was a landmark ruling on the doctrine of striking similarities. The U.S. Court of Appeals for the Seventh Circuit ruled that while copying must be proved by access and substantial similarity, where evidence of access does not exist, striking similarities may raise an inference of copying by showing that the work could not have been the result of independent creation, coincidence, or common source. Striking similarity alone is not enough to infer access. The similarity must preclude independent creation in order to infer access.

== Background ==
In the fall of 1975, Ronald H. Selle (born August 7, 1946), a Hazel Crest, Illinois resident and at that time, a Chicago clothing salesman for Carson, Pierie and Scott and part-time musician, wrote a song called "Let it End." Selle holds a master's degree in Music Education from the University of Illinois. To support his wife Joanne and their daughter and two sons, he supplemented his income with a three-piece band that performed engagements around the Chicago area, worked as a church choir director, and occasionally wrote religious and secular music.

Selle claimed the melody for "Let it End" came to his mind while getting ready for work one morning. He wrote it down and developed it further while at work, then came home from work later that day, sitting at a piano and completing it by the end of the night. He was issued a copyright for the completed song on November 17, 1975, by the U.S. Copyright Office. Shortly afterwards, Selle and his fellow musicians recorded the song in a studio setting, with Selle singing the lyrics.

Within a year after recording the song (the recording was played at trial), Selle mailed it to fourteen music publishers. None of them responded, with all but three returning his material.

In May 1978, while working in his yard, Selle heard his teenaged next-door neighbor playing the Bee Gees song "How Deep Is Your Love" rather loudly on a cassette player and asked him what the song was, having heard it for the first time. Selle recognized the song as his melody but with different lyrics. After learning it was featured in the movie Saturday Night Fever, Selle examined the cassette jacket for the soundtrack, seeing that the songwriting credit was for the Bee Gees. Later, Selle went and saw the movie, where he again heard the song and recognized the melody as his own.

Selle filed suit in U.S. District Court for the Northern District of Illinois, accusing Barry, Robin & Maurice Gibb, their record label distributor Polygram, and Paramount Pictures of misappropriation and copyright infringement.

== District Court trial ==
Selle requested a jury trial, which began on February 20, 1983, in the U.S. District Court for Northern Illinois, the Honorable Judge George N. Leighton presiding. In opening statements Selle's attorney, Allen Engerman, established that Selle's case was based on the doctrine of striking similarities. The Bee Gees' defense attorney established their case was based on lack of access and the fact that similarities alone, without proof of access, could not prove copying. The defense would show that any similarities were coincidental and were due to the limited note range in popular music and were not the result of copying.

On direct examination, Selle testified as to how he wrote his song, made the demo tape and wrote the sheet music, copyrighted it, and then sent it off to fourteen music publishers. He explained that eleven publishers returned his materials unopened, while three publishers never replied. As his evidence that the Bee Gees had infringed on his copyright, Selle offered two exhibits that showed a comparison of the eight opening and eight closing bars of his song, "Let it End," to the opening and closing bars for "How Deep Is Your Love."

On cross-examination, the Bee Gees attorney, Robert Osterberg, presented Selle with several Bee Gees songs that predated his that also contained those same eight bars of melody, as well as the Beatles song, "From Me to You." Selle admitted that there were some similarities, primarily in melody rather than rhythm, between his song and "From Me To You" and the earlier Bee Gee compositions.

Selle offered an expert witness, Arrand Parsons. Parsons had a background in classical music. However, under cross-examination, Parsons admitted that he did not know whether or not there is a great deal of similarity between songs in the popular music genre. He could not testify that the similarities between "Let it End," and "How Deep is Your Love," could only have been caused by copying and not by independent creation or coincidence or prior common source.

The Bee Gees entered a work tape and lead sheet and a finished demo tape into evidence. Barry Gibb and the Bee Gees' keyboard player, Blue Weaver, as well as manager Dick Ashby, and record producer, Albhy Galuten, gave testimony on the process the Bee Gees used to come up with "How Deep is Your Love." Barry Gibb explained that he and his brothers could not read or write music, but employed others skilled for this purpose. Thus, they worked out songs using a piano and a process of trial and error as they did in creating "How Deep is Your Love." Their staff then translated the draft to musical notes. Maurice and Robin Gibb corroborated their testimony. They also testified that the brothers and their staff had gone to the Château d'Hérouville, a recording studio in France, in January 1977. There, they had composed six songs, using their usual process, for the soundtrack to Saturday Night Fever, as well as mixed a live album. Selle did not challenge their testimony, nor the evidence the Bee Gees offered. The defense rested after this testimony and did not call their expert witnesses to the stand.

The trial lasted four days. On the fifth day, the jury returned a verdict for the plaintiff. The jury foreman, Earl Wiler later explained that the Bee Gees had not offered any evidence or testimony to counter the plaintiff's expert witness, Arrand Parsons. Another juror said that, "If we made a mistake, they can afford it."

The Bee Gees attorney immediately moved for a judgment notwithstanding the verdict, arguing that Selle had not met his burden of proof. On April 22, 1983, Judge Leighton granted the motion. In reviewing the record, Judge Leighton wrote in his decision, "the verdict in favor of the plaintiff was against the manifest weight of the evidence and its return by the jury represents a miscarriage of justice."

== Appeals Court findings ==
Selle appealed Judge Leighton's ruling to the Seventh Circuit Court of Appeals. He claimed that the District Court had misunderstood his theory of proof which was that striking similarities alone were enough to infer access and offered supporting case law. The case was argued April 13, 1984 and the decision rendered July 23, 1984.

In affirming Judge Leighton's ruling, Judge Richard Dickson Cudahy wrote in the opinion that while, "It is often written that striking similarities alone can establish access, the decided cases suggest that this circumstance would be most unusual. The plaintiff must always present sufficient evidence to support a reasonable possibility of access because the jury cannot draw an inference of access based upon speculation and conjecture alone." Cudahy cited Twentieth Century-Fox Film Corp. v. Dieckhaus, 153 F.2d 893 (8th Cir.), cert. denied, 329 U.S. 716, 67 S. Ct. 46, 91 L.Ed. 621 (1946). He concluded that ". . .although proof of striking similarity may permit an inference of access, the plaintiff must still meet some minimum threshold of proof which demonstrates that the inference of access is reasonable."

The Court said, "Selle did not establish a basis from which the jury could reasonably infer that the Bee Gees had access to his song and to meet the burden of proving "striking similarity" between the two compositions." Because Selle could not do this, the Court affirmed the district court's ruling overturning the jury verdict.

== See also ==
- Copyright law of the United States
- Bee Gees discography
