= Run to Me (Bee Gees song) =

"Run To Me"

Single by Bee Gees

from the album To Whom It May Concern
- B-side: "Road to Alaska"
- Released: 7 July 1972
- Recorded: 12 April 1972
- Studio: IBC Studios, London
- Genre: Pop, soft rock
- Length: 3:11
- Label: Polydor; Philips; Atco
- Songwriters: Barry Gibb; Robin Gibb; Maurice Gibb
- Producers: Robert Stigwood, Bee Gees

Bee Gees singles chronology
"My World" (1972)	"Run To Me" (1972)	"Alive" (1972)

Audio sample
- "Run to Me": file; help

"Run to Me" is a song by the Bee Gees, the lead single from the group's album To Whom It May Concern (1972). The song reached the UK Top 10 and the US Top 20.

== Writing and recording ==
Barry, Robin, and Maurice Gibb are credited as co-writers of "Run to Me". Later, Robin Gibb recalled, "We recorded 'Run to Me' and Andy Williams cut it on his LP. If Andy Williams came up to us and said write a song and we wrote 'Run to Me' for him, he probably wouldn't have recorded it. But we recorded it and then he recorded it."

"Run to Me" was recorded on 12 April 1972 at London's IBC Studios, on the same day as "Bad Bad Dreams" and "Please Don't Turn Out The Lights" were recorded. The song was similar to the band's last two successful singles, "Don't Wanna Live Inside Myself" and "My World". "Run to Me" includes vocals by both Barry and Robin Gibb.

== Release and live performances ==
Released on 7 July 1972 as the lead single off of the album To Whom It May Concern, "Run to Me" climbed to number nine in the UK; in the US, it reached number 16.

Cash Box said that the song "features [the Bee Gees'] best chorus in years." Record World said that it "is as gently irresistible as 'How Can You Mend a Broken Heart.'"

A promotional video for this song was filmed in black and white, featuring Barry and Robin singing in front of Maurice's grand piano.

== Chart performance ==
=== Weekly charts ===
Chart (1972)	Peak position
Argentina Singles Chart	10
Australia (Go-Set)	3
Australia (Kent Music Report)	3
Bangkok	1
Brazil	2
Canada (RPM) Top Singles	6
Canada RPM Adult Contemporary	8
Denmark	10
France (SNEP)	85
Ireland (IRMA)	7
Italy (Musica e Dischi)	4
Netherlands (Dutch Top 40)	28
New Zealand (Listener)	6
South Africa (Springbok)	3
Spain (PROMUSICAE)	8
UK (Official Charts Company)	9
US Billboard Hot 100	16
US Billboard Easy Listening	6
US Cash Box Top 100	11
US Record World	9

=== Year-end charts ===
Chart (1972)	Rank
Australia	27
Canada	91
South Africa	16
US Cash Box	97

== Personnel ==
- Barry Gibb – lead and backing vocals, rhythm guitar
- Robin Gibb – lead and harmony vocals
- Maurice Gibb – harmony vocals, bass, piano, rhythm guitar
- Clem Cattini – drums
- Alan Kendall – lead guitar
- Bill Shepherd – orchestral arrangement

== Cover versions ==
- Dionne Warwick and Barry Manilow released a version in 1985, which reached number 12 in the US Adult Contemporary chart and at number 86 in the UK.
- In 1986, Dutch singers Anita Meyer and Lee Towers had a top 10 hit in The Netherlands with a live version.
- Former British band Bliss recorded and released a version in 1999 in U.K. and Asia.
- Boxer Oscar De La Hoya released a version in 2000 which topped the charts in Brazil.
- Susanna Hoffs and Matthew Sweet covered it on their 2006 album Under the Covers, Vol. 1
- Barry Gibb re-recorded the song as a duet with Brandi Carlile for his 2021 album Greenfields.

== See also ==
- List of number-one Billboard Hot Latin Tracks of 2000
