= In Our Own Time =

- Directed by: Martyn Atkins
- Produced by: Skot Bright
- Distributed by: Eagle Rock Entertainment
- Release date: November 16, 2010
- Running time: 116 minutes

In Our Own Time is a 2010 biographical film of the musical group, The Bee Gees. The story follows the Brothers Gibb, Barry, Robin and Maurice from their roots in Manchester, England through their emigration to Australia in 1958 to their international stardom in 1967, right up to the present, with new interviews done by Barry and Robin (prior to his death in 2012), and archival footage of Maurice (who died in 2003). Many live performances are featured, along with video clips, TV performances and home movies from their early days. As of April 2025, it was available for streaming on PBS, Qello Concerts, Apple TV, and Amazon Prime Video.

== Chapters ==
1. In Our Own Time
2. First Fame
3. Lonely Days
4. Beat Of A Different Drum
5. Fever
6. Andy
7. Spirits Having Flown
8. Songwriters
9. Brothers In Harmony
10. Recognition
11. The Music Must Go On

== Clips Featured ==
In Our Own Time features clips of many of their greatest hits including: You Should Be Dancing, New York Mining Disaster 1941, Massachusetts (Bee Gees song), Run to Me (Bee Gees song), Jive Talkin', Stayin' Alive, Night Fever, How Deep Is Your Love (Bee Gees song), Tragedy (Bee Gees song), You Win Again (Bee Gees song). as well as their collaborations such as Guilty (Barbra Streisand and Barry Gibb song) with Barbra Streisand, and Immortality (Celine Dion song) with Celine Dion.

== Releases ==
New interviews were filmed in high definition and archival footage is presented in 16:9 aspect ratio. In Our Own Time was released on DVD and Blu-ray.
