= Country Woman =

- German picture sleeve of "Country Woman"

Single by Bee Gees
- A-side: "How Can You Mend a Broken Heart"
- Released: May 1971
- Recorded: 6 April 1971
- Genre: Blues rock, country rock, folk rock
- Length: 2:48
- Label: Polydor (United Kingdom); Atco (United States)
- Songwriter(s): Maurice Gibb
- Producer(s): Robert Stigwood, Bee Gees

Bee Gees flipsides singles chronology
"Man for All Seasons" (1970)	"Country Woman" (1971)	"Walking Back to Waterloo" (1971)

"Country Woman" is a song released by the British band Bee Gees. It was written and performed solely by Maurice Gibb, and released as a B-side of "How Can You Mend a Broken Heart", which was the group's first US No. 1. The songs were released as a double A-side in Germany, France, Japan and Canada.

== Recording ==
The song was recorded at the sessions for the group's album Trafalgar, although unlike How Can You Mend a Broken Heart, it did not make the final cut, instead being relegated to the flip-side of the single. It was recorded on April 6 in IBC on the same day that they finished the songs "God's Good Grace" (unreleased) and "The Greatest Man in the World" (released on the album Trafalgar). Two acoustic guitars played by Maurice and Alan Kendall open the song. Like many of Maurice Gibb's songs written for the group, Barry and Robin Gibb did not contribute to the recording, and Maurice played bass, piano and rhythm guitar as well as handling all the vocals.

== Personnel ==
- Maurice Gibb — lead and harmony vocals, acoustic guitar, piano, bass guitar
- Alan Kendall — acoustic lead guitar
- Geoff Bridgford — drums
- Bill Shepherd — orchestral arrangement
- Uncredited — horns
