= On Time (song) =

Single by Bee Gees
- A-side: "My World"
- Released: 14 January 1972
- Recorded: 21 October 1971; IBC Studios, London
- Length: 3:00
- Label: Polydor (United Kingdom); Atco (United States)
- Songwriter: Maurice Gibb
- Producers: Robert Stigwood, Bee Gees

Bee Gees flipsides singles chronology
"Walking Back to Waterloo" (1971)	"On Time" (1972)	"Road to Alaska" (1972)

"On Time" is a song written by Maurice Gibb and recorded by the Bee Gees; it was released on 14 January 1972 as the B-side of the single "My World".

== Background ==
It was recorded on 21 October 1971 in London, the day that they finished the song "Alive", which was included on their 1972 album To Whom It May Concern. The swamp rocker "On Time" was one of Maurice's favourites, this being the first of three recordings he made of it. Maurice and guitarist Alan Kendall share a few tracks of acoustic and electric guitars, accompanied by Geoff Bridgford on drums and string arrangement by Bill Shepherd that should not fit in, but does. Maurice later described this number as his "Swamp period".

"On Time" was only available on vinyl until it was included in the 1990 box set Tales from the Brothers Gibb. The single was released as a double A in the UK, Mexico, Spain and in Yugoslavia. In Mexico, the song was released under the title "A Tiempo". The song was released in 1971 in other countries like France, Germany and Italy.

== Personnel ==
- Maurice Gibb — lead and backing vocals, acoustic lead guitar
- Geoff Bridgford — drums
- Alan Kendall — electric lead guitar, guitar solo
- Bill Shepherd — orchestral arrangement

== Cover versions ==
- Mike Berry and Bob Saker covered the song on their album Drift Away which was produced and played on by Maurice Gibb.
- Maurice Gibb re-recorded "On Time" in 1983 for the film A Breed Apart and its accompanying soundtrack, but it was the 1972 Bee Gees recording that was used in the film, and the 1983 version sounds like a home demo with guitars and drum track. The several guitar tracks may include a contribution from Alan Kendall. This version was recorded at the brothers' Middle Ear studios in Miami Beach, Florida.
- Richard Ashcroft sampled "On Time" on his song "Are You Ready?" which featured in the 2011 film The Adjustment Bureau. "Are You Ready?" was credited to Ashcroft and Maurice.
- Steve Gibb performed this in his father Barry Gibb's, concert at the Hard Rock in Miami as well as on Barry's Mythology Tour (2013-2014). He also recorded his own version for the Gibb Collective project Please Don't Turn Out the Lights.
