= Statue of Bee Gees (Redcliffe, Queensland) =

Statue in Redcliffe, Queensland, Australia

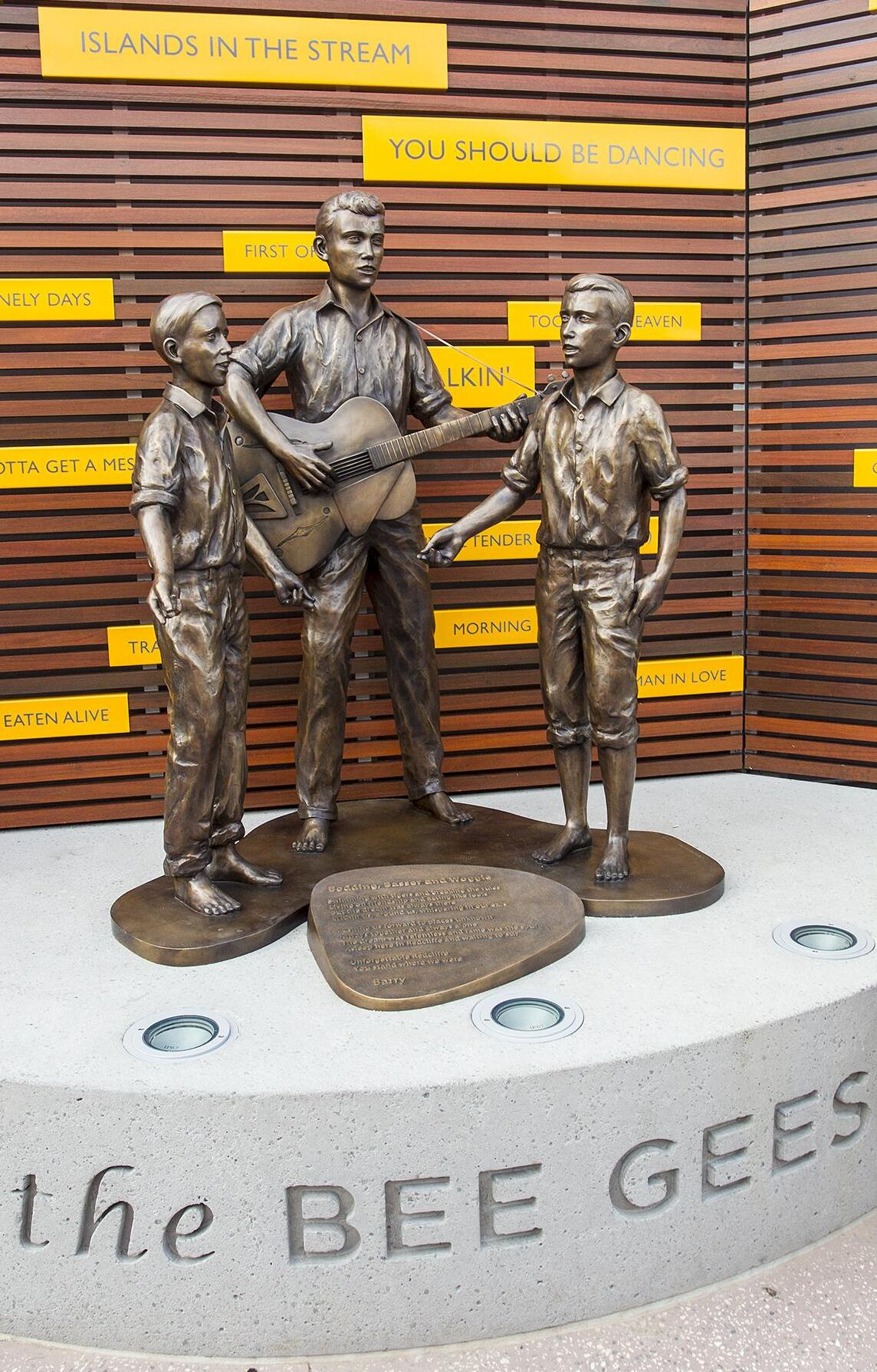
- Artist: Phillip Piperides
- Subject: Bee Gees
- Location: Redcliffe, Queensland, Australia; 27°13′39″S 153°06′53″E

A statue of the Bee Gees has been erected at 109 Redcliffe Parade, Bee Gees Way, Redcliffe, Queensland, 4020 Australia. It was unveiled on 14 February 2013 by Barry Gibb, the only surviving member of the group. It was created by sculptor Phillip Piperides.

== See also ==
- Statue of Bee Gees (Douglas, Isle of Man)
