= Trafalgar (album) =

Studio album by the Bee Gees
- Released: September 1971
- Recorded: 28 January – April 1971
- Studio: IBC (London)
- Genres: Pop; soft rock
- Length: 47:28
- Labels: Polydor (UK); Atco (US)
- Producers: Robert Stigwood, Bee Gees

The Bee Gees chronology
2 Years On (1970)	Trafalgar (1971)	To Whom It May Concern (1972)

Singles from Trafalgar
- 1. "How Can You Mend a Broken Heart" Released: May 1971; 2. "Don't Wanna Live Inside Myself" Released: November 1971 (US); 3. "Israel" Released: May 1972 (Europe)

Professional ratings
Review scores
Source	Rating
AllMusic	4/5 stars
The Rolling Stone Album Guide	2.5/5 stars
Tom Hull – on the Web	C−

Trafalgar is a 1971 album by the Bee Gees. It was their ninth album (seventh internationally), and was released in September 1971 in the US, and November 1971 in the UK. The album was a moderate hit in the United States, and peaked at No. 34. The lead single "How Can You Mend a Broken Heart?" was the Bee Gees' first number one single in the United States but failed to chart in Britain as did the album. It is Geoff Bridgford's only full-length appearance on a Bee Gees album as an official member.

Trafalgar is included in Robert Dimery's edited collection 1001 Albums You Must Hear Before You Die.

== Recording ==
In December 1970, barely more than two months after the group recorded their last session for the 2 Years On album, they recorded "Together", "Over the Hill and Over the Mountain", "Merrily Merry Eyes" and "When Do I": this last song would appear on the Trafalgar album. They returned to the studio with new backing band member, guitarist Alan Kendall, who would play on the majority of their subsequent albums. Several songs were recorded around this time which have not been officially released. All of the songs chosen for release were ballads. Recording began on 28 January 1971 with "We Lost the Road", "When Do I" and "How Can You Mend a Broken Heart" ("We Lost the Road" was held over for use on the following album To Whom It May Concern). Recording continued through April.

== Release ==
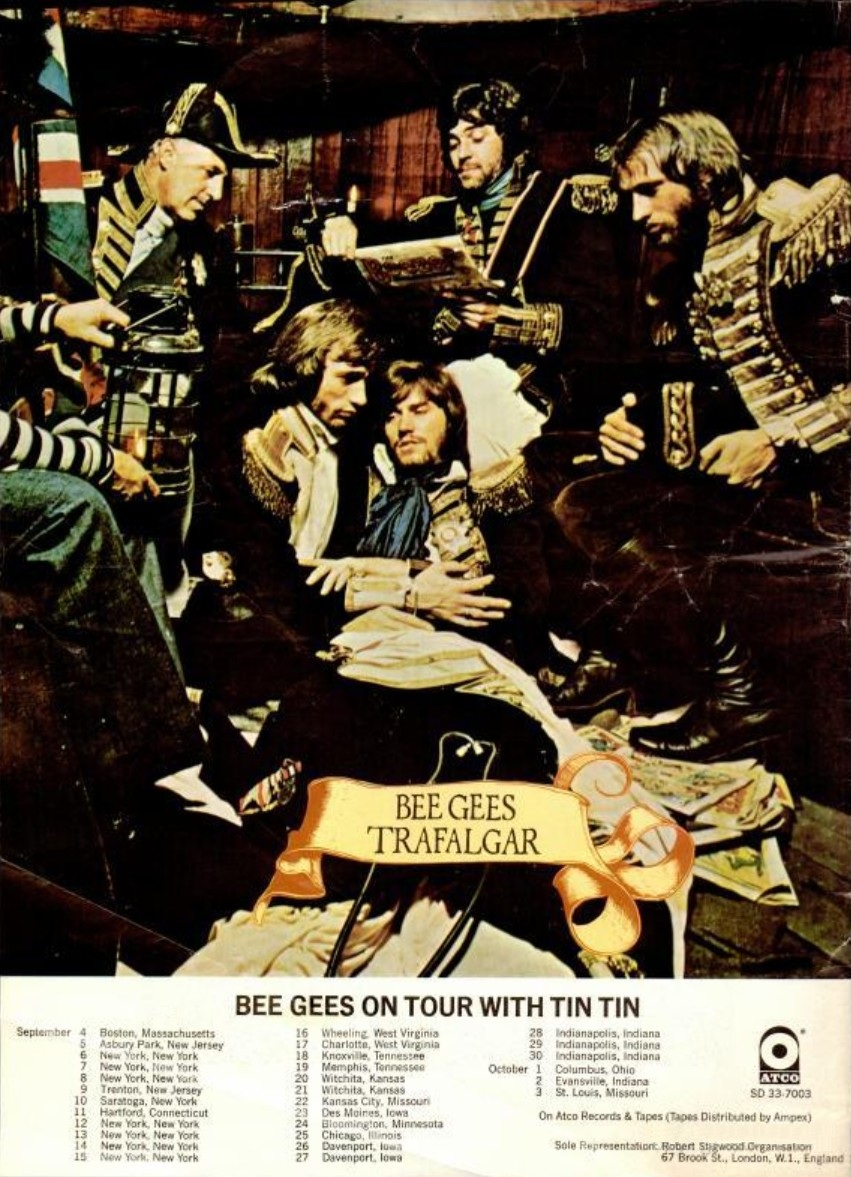
Advertisement and tour schedule

With "How Can You Mend a Broken Heart" as the lead single from the album, "Don't Wanna Live Inside Myself" was released as the second single but only reached No. 57 on the US charts. "Israel" was released as a single in the Netherlands and reached No. 22. The album's cover depicts the battle of Trafalgar. Bridgford was credited on the sleeve notes on the original vinyl release as "Jeoff Bridgford".

In support of the album, The Bee Gees toured the US in the fall of 1971, playing such cities as Boston, Asbury Park, New York City (7 shows), Memphis, Kansas City, and Indianapolis.

== Track listing ==
Side one
No.	Title	Writer(s)	Lead vocal(s)	Length
1.	"How Can You Mend a Broken Heart"	Barry Gibb, Robin Gibb	Barry and Robin	3:58
2.	"Israel"	Barry Gibb	Barry	3:54
3.	"The Greatest Man in the World"	Barry Gibb	Barry	4:18
4.	"It's Just the Way"	Maurice Gibb	Maurice	2:34
5.	"Remembering"	Barry Gibb, Robin Gibb	Robin	4:02
6.	"Somebody Stop the Music"	Barry Gibb, Maurice Gibb	Barry and Maurice	3:31

Side two
No.	Title	Writer(s)	Lead vocal(s)	Length
1.	"Trafalgar"	Maurice Gibb	Maurice	3:53
2.	"Don't Wanna Live Inside Myself"	Barry Gibb	Barry	5:25
3.	"When Do I"	Barry Gibb, Robin Gibb	Robin	3:58
4.	"Dearest"	Barry Gibb, Robin Gibb	Barry and Robin	3:52
5.	"Lion in Winter"	Barry Gibb, Robin Gibb	Barry and Robin	3:59
6.	"Walking Back to Waterloo"	Barry Gibb, Robin Gibb, Maurice Gibb	Robin and Barry	3:51

=== Alternative version ===
- This 53-minute version of the album was sent to Atlantic Records in the United States with a different track order and with 14 songs in total. The two extra songs are "Country Woman" (the B-side of "How Can You Mend a Broken Heart") and "We Lost the Road" (released on the group's next album To Whom It May Concern). There was no commercial release of the album in the US.

Side one

1. "How Can You Mend a Broken Heart"
2. "Israel"
3. "The Greatest Man in the World"
4. "It's Just the Way"
5. "Don't Wanna Live Inside Myself"
6. "Country Woman"
7. "Somebody Stop the Music"

Side two

1. "Trafalgar"
2. "We Lost the Road"
3. "Dearest"
4. "When Do I"
5. "Lion in Winter"
6. "Remembering"
7. "Walking Back to Waterloo"

== Personnel ==
Credits from Bee Gees historian and sessionographer Joseph Brennan.

Bee Gees

- Barry Gibb – lead, harmony, and backing vocals; rhythm guitar
- Robin Gibb – lead, harmony, and backing vocals
- Maurice Gibb – harmony and backing vocals, bass, rhythm guitar, piano, Mellotron, Hammond organ, lead vocals on "It’s Just the Way" and "Trafalgar", drums on "Trafalgar"
- Geoff Bridgford – drums

Additional personnel and production staff

- Alan Kendall – lead guitar
- Bryan Scott – audio engineer
- Bill Shepherd – orchestral arrangement
- Robert Stigwood – producer
- Bee Gees – producers

== Charts ==
Chart	Peak position
Australian Kent Music Report	8
Canadian RPM Albums Chart	17
Japanese Oricon LPs Chart	57
Spanish Albums Chart	9
US Billboard 200	34
US Cashbox	18
