= To Whom It May Concern (Bee Gees album) =

Studio album by the Bee Gees
- Released: October 1972
- Recorded: January 1971 ("We Lost the Road"); January and April 1972
- Studio: IBC (London)
- Genre: Pop rock, soft rock
- Length: 43:32
- Label: Polydor (UK); Atco (US)
- Producer: Robert Stigwood, Bee Gees

The Bee Gees chronology
Trafalgar (1971)	To Whom It May Concern (1972)	Life in a Tin Can (1973)

Singles from To Whom It May Concern
- 1. "Run to Me" Released: July 1972; 2. "Sea of Smiling Faces" Released: November 1972 (Japan); 3. "Alive" Released: December 1972

Professional ratings
Review scores
Source	Rating
AllMusic	3.5/5 stars
The Rolling Stone Album Guide	1.5/5 stars

To Whom It May Concern is the tenth album by the Bee Gees. Released in October 1972, it is the follow-up to, and continues the melancholic and personal sound of its predecessor, Trafalgar. The album was recognised as "a farewell to the old Bee Gees" as the album marked the end of an era for the group in several ways: it was their last album to be recorded solely at IBC Studios, in London, their last with conductor and arranger Bill Shepherd, who had guided them since 1967, and their last under their first contract with Robert Stigwood. Some of the songs were old ones finished or rewritten for the occasion (as in the case of "I Can Bring Love").

== Background and recording ==
After touring in 1971 to promote their previous album, Trafalgar, the Bee Gees worked quickly to complete another album. They recorded the song "Paper Mache, Cabbages and Kings" on 3 January 1972 which was the last song recorded with the Australian drummer Geoff Bridgford. Bridgford was the final non-Gibb brother to be a full member of the group. He left the group before their tour of East Asia and was replaced on tour by Chris Karan. Recording resumed in April 1972 with a Robin song called "Never Been Alone" and a song Barry did on his fan club recording from 1971 called "I Can Bring Love". The drummer on the April sessions was a veteran session player, Clem Cattini. The first song recorded for this album was "You Know It's For You", a song written and performed by Maurice Gibb, on which he played guitar, bass, keyboard and mellotron. Karan did not participate with the Bee Gees in the studio as Clem Cattini recalls:

On the album it's got a photograph of Chris Karan which is ridiculous really, because it wasn't Chris playing on the album, it was me!. As far as I'm concerned, I think they [Bee Gees] have an unbelievable talent – I'd give anything just to have written one of the songs that they've written, especially the later stuff.

The album was primarily recorded between June 1971 and April 1972 (except for "We Lost the Road", recorded in January 1971 during the Trafalgar sessions). The Bee Gees saved a non-album single, "My World", from the sessions which was released in January 1972, becoming a UK/US Top 20 hit. Shepherd's arrangements are relatively toned down and the background vocals sometimes seem to take the place of what could have been string sections.

== Release and reception ==
The album was released in November 1972. Stephen Holden's contemporary review in Rolling Stone commented that he felt the Bee Gees occupied "a very limited territory of pop music", dealing mainly in ballads of "momentary pathos", and that the album was "headphone mood music that makes no demands beyond a superficial emotional surrender to its perfumed atmosphere of pink frosting and glitter", and that the Gibbs vocal style had developed to the point where "they sound more like reed instruments than singers". Bruce Eder in a retrospective review for AllMusic feels the album makes for pleasant and satisfying listening, and is "one of their most fully realized works".

To Whom It May Concern only reached No. 35 in the US; it was their third consecutive studio album to fail to appear in the UK album charts. It performed better in other European countries; in Spain reached No. 6. The subsequent single "Alive" was a modest-sized hit in the US, reaching the Top 40, and a major hit in Australia, reaching No. 4. In the 2010 documentary In Our Own Time, Maurice was shown explaining (in archival footage) that by 1972 they didn't really know who their audience was, hence the title To Whom It May Concern. The original album cover was a gatefold with pictures of business associates and family members on a drawing of the Bee Gees and a band. The band shows Barry, Robin and Maurice Gibb (Maurice is playing Rickenbacker 4001), Alan Kendall and tour-only drummer Chris Karan, with Bill Shepherd conducting the orchestra.

"Paper Mache, Cabbages and Kings" entered the Danish charts in the first week of 1973 and stayed in the charts for 5 weeks, peaking at #8.

== Track listing ==
All tracks are written by Barry, Robin and Maurice Gibb, except where noted.

Side one
No.	Title	Writer(s)	Lead vocal(s)	Length
1.	"Run to Me"		Barry and Robin	3:05
2.	"We Lost the Road"	Barry Gibb, Robin Gibb	Barry and Robin	3:27
3.	"Never Been Alone"	Robin Gibb	Robin	3:11
4.	"Paper Mache, Cabbages and Kings"		Barry and Robin	4:59
5.	"I Can Bring Love"	Barry Gibb	Barry	2:06
6.	"I Held a Party"		Robin and Barry	2:35
7.	"Please Don't Turn Out the Lights"		Robin and Barry	1:59

Side two
No.	Title	Writer(s)	Lead vocal(s)	Length
1.	"Sea of Smiling Faces"		Barry and Robin	3:07
2.	"Bad Bad Dreams"		Barry	3:47
3.	"You Know It's for You"	Maurice Gibb	Maurice	2:57
4.	"Alive"	Barry Gibb, Maurice Gibb	Barry	4:04
5.	"Road to Alaska"		Robin	2:38
6.	"Sweet Song of Summer"		Barry and Robin	5:04

=== Alternate track listing ===
Some publicity material featured an alternate trackorder although no commercial release of it exists.

Side one

"Alive" / "I Can Bring Love" / "Bad Bad Dreams" / "I Held a Party" / "Sea of Smiling Faces" / "Road to Alaska" / "Run to Me"

Side two

"Paper Mache, Cabbages and Kings" / "We Lost the Road" / "You Know It's For You" / "Never Been Alone" / "Please Don't Turn Out the Lights" / "Sweet Song of Summer"

== Personnel ==
Credits from Bee Gees historian and sessionographer Joseph Brennan.

Bee Gees

- Barry Gibb – lead vocals, harmony and backing vocals, rhythm guitar
- Robin Gibb – lead, harmony, and backing vocals
- Maurice Gibb – harmony and backing vocals, bass guitar, rhythm guitar, piano, Hammond organ, Mellotron, harpsichord, mandolin, Moog synthesizer on "Sweet Song of Summer", lead vocals on "You Know It’s For You"
- Geoff Bridgford – drums on "We Lost the Road", "Paper Mache, Cabbages, and Kings", and "Alive"

Additional musicians

- Alan Kendall – lead guitar
- Clem Cattini – drums (except "We Lost the Road", "Paper Mache, Cabbages, and Kings". and "Alive")
- Bill Shepherd – orchestral arrangement

Production staff

- Mike Claydon, Damon Lyon-Shaw, Richard Manwaring, Andy Knight – engineers
- Mike Vickers – synthesizer engineer on "Sweet Song of Summer"
- Robert Stigwood – producer
- Bee Gees – producers

== Charts ==
Chart	Position
Australian Kent Music Report	13
Canadian RPM Albums Chart	50
Japanese Oricon LPs Chart	53
Spanish Albums Chart	6
US Billboard 200	35
