= Don't Wanna Live Inside Myself =

Single by Bee Gees

from the album Trafalgar
- B-side: "Walking Back to Waterloo"
- Released: October 1971
- Recorded: 7 April 1971; IBC Studios, London
- Genre: Pop
- Length: 5:24
- Label: Polydor (United Kingdom); Atco (United States)
- Songwriter: Barry Gibb
- Producers: Robert Stigwood, Bee Gees

Bee Gees singles chronology
"How Can You Mend a Broken Heart" (1971)	"Don't Wanna Live Inside Myself" (1971)	"My World" (1972)

Audio sample
- "Don't Wanna Live Inside Myself": file; help

"Don't Wanna Live Inside Myself" is a ballad written and sung by Barry Gibb, and released on the Bee Gees' album Trafalgar in 1971, and the second single release taken from the album.

== Recording and release ==
"Don't Wanna Live Inside Myself" was the last song recorded for the album; it was recorded on April 7, the same day that the Bee Gees finished the tracks "Israel", "It's Just the Way" and "Engines, Aeroplanes". Barry Gibb said of it "I don't know if it reflects me or not. Maybe I was in a bad mood when I write it.

The single was released in October 1971, two months after the number 1 hit "How Can You Mend a Broken Heart". Although "How Can You Mend a Broken Heart" was a number 1, this song did not even make the top fifty in the US. It was also released as a single in Canada, Japan, Portugal, Spain and the Netherlands; it had its best chart performance in the Netherlands, peaking at number 29.

== Reception ==
Cash Box said of it that it was "another classic outing from the Brothers Gibb certain to trigger off a mighty sales explosion" and that it would likely repeat the chart success of "How Can You Mend a Broken Heart". Record World said: "there's no reason to believe [that Don't Wanna Live Inside Myself'] won't do as well" as previous Bee Gees' hit singles. Billboard called it "another powerful ballad performance loaded with the same sales and chart potency" as "How Can You Mend a Broken Heart". With the success of "...Broken Heart", Atco Records was choosing ballads exclusively for Bee Gees singles during this time. This song along with "Walking Back to Waterloo" was released as a double A-side in Spain, Canada, Japan and the US. The album version of the song was faded at 5:24.

Lubbock Avalanche Journal critic Jon Clemens criticized the song for sounding better than it really is due to some obscure lyrics. As an example, he gave the lines "Don't wanna live inside myself/I'm much better off alone/But then you must believe in the falling rain", saying that "It starts out like a typical Bee Gee's lost-love number, but then what's this about falling rain?" Capital Journal critic Steve Gettinger criticized the song for being "self-pitying". Evening Dispatch critic June Hawdon similarly felt that the song is "very slow and over-sad." On the other hand, The Buffalo News critic Charles Schrieber praised it for using the "slow, deliberate pace" of "How Can You Mend a Broken Heart" "without actually sounding like a repeat." Winston-Salem Journal critic Jim Shertzer said that it is "equally affecting [to 'How Can You Mend a Broken Heart'], and the utterly lonesome quality of the vocal comes close to being too painful to take." In 1001 Albums You Must Hear Before You Die, Dave Nichols complained that the song "pays too much homage to 'While My Guitar Gently Weeps.'"

A promotional single issued by Atco in the US, featured the song in its mono and stereo versions on its respective sides.

"Don't Wanna Live Inside Myeslf" was released on the Bee Gees' compilation albums Best of Bee Gees, Volume 2 in 1973 and Tales from the Brothers Gibb in 1990.

== Personnel ==
- Barry Gibb — lead vocals
- Robin Gibb - harmony vocals
- Maurice Gibb — piano, bass, harmony vocals
- Geoff Bridgford — drums
- Bill Shepherd — orchestral arrangement

== Chart positions ==
Chart (1971)	Peak position
Canada Top Singles (RPM)	34
Netherlands (Dutch Top 40)	29
US Billboard Hot 100	53
US Cash Box	39
US Record World	30
