= Statue of Bee Gees (Douglas, Isle of Man) =

2021 statue in Douglas, Isle of Man

- The Bee Gees statue in Douglas
- Artist: Andy Edwards
- Year: 2021
- Medium: Bronze sculpture
- Subject: Bee Gees (Barry, Maurice and Robin Gibb)
- Dimensions: 2.1 m (7 ft)
- Location: 54°09′01″N 4°28′37.5″W

A statue of the Bee Gees by sculptor Andy Edwards was unveiled in Douglas, Isle of Man, in 2021. The brothers were born on the Isle of Man. The statue is located on Loch Promenade between Marine Gardens 1 and 2 and opposite Regent Street. The 7-foot (2.1 m) bronze sculptures depict Barry, Maurice, and Robin Gibb, and the artist was inspired by the group's music video for "Stayin' Alive". The £170,000 project was commissioned in 2019.

== See also ==
- 2021 in art
- Statue of Bee Gees (Redcliffe, Queensland)
