= How Can You Mend a Broken Heart =

1971 song by Barry and Robin Gibb

Single by Bee Gees

from the album Trafalgar
- B-side: "Country Woman"
- Released: 28 May 1971
- Recorded: 28 January 1971
- Studio: IBC Studios, London
- Genre: Pop; folk rock; country soul
- Length: 3:57
- Label: Polydor; Atco (United States, Canada)
- Songwriters: Barry Gibb; Robin Gibb
- Producers: Robert Stigwood; Bee Gees

Bee Gees singles chronology
"Lonely Days" (1970)	"How Can You Mend a Broken Heart" (1971)	"Don't Wanna Live Inside Myself" (1971)

Music video
- "How Can You Mend A Broken Heart (Live in Las Vegas, 1997 - One Night Only)" on YouTube

"How Can You Mend a Broken Heart" is a song released by the Bee Gees on 28 May 1971. It was written by Barry and Robin Gibb and was the first single on the group's 1971 album Trafalgar. It was their first US No. 1 single and also reached No. 1 in Cashbox magazine for two weeks.

== Writing and recording ==
Barry and Robin Gibb wrote the song in August 1970 with "Lonely Days" when the Gibb brothers had reconvened following a period of break-up and alienation. "Robin came to my place," says Barry, "and that afternoon we wrote 'How Can You Mend a Broken Heart' and that obviously was a link to us coming back together." They originally offered the song to Andy Williams, but ended up recording it themselves, although Williams did later cover the song on his album You've Got a Friend.

The single version was recorded on 28 January 1971 in London. The group's later song "My World" followed along the same musical ideas on this song. Robin Gibb's remarked on the song, "The whole thing took about an hour to complete. The song reached the number one spot, to our great satisfaction."

== Reception ==
Although failing to chart on the UK Singles Chart, the song became the Bee Gees' first US number one on the Billboard Hot 100 and also reached number four on the Billboard Adult Contemporary chart. Billboard ranked it as the No. 5 song for 1971. Cash Box described the song as being "a slower, almost country-ballad styled performance which links an intricate melody segment with more powerful thrusts to give the track top forty impetus." Record World called it a "lovely tune [that] can't miss."

Following the release of "How Can You Mend a Broken Heart", the song was nominated for a Grammy Award for Best Pop Vocal Performance by a Duo Or Group along with George Harrison's "My Sweet Lord" and others. It was performed as part of a medley on The Midnight Special on 10 October 1975, in Japan on the Japanese TV special Love Sounds, and on the Mr. Natural tour in 1974. A live version recorded on 17 and 18 November 1989, at the National Tennis Centre, Melbourne, Australia, was used for the benefit album Nobody's Child: Romanian Angel Appeal. Between 1997 and 1999, the song was performed on the One Night Only tour as part of a medley. It was last performed by the Bee Gees in 2001.

Barry Gibb re-recorded the song as a duet with Sheryl Crow for his 2020 solo album, Greenfields: The Gibb Brothers Songbook, Vol. 1.

== Personnel ==
- Barry Gibb – lead and harmony vocals, rhythm guitar
- Robin Gibb – lead and harmony vocals
- Maurice Gibb – harmony vocals, bass guitar, piano, rhythm guitar, Hammond organ
- Geoff Bridgford – drums
- Bill Shepherd – orchestral and strings arrangement

== Charts ==
=== Weekly charts ===
Chart (1971)	Peak position
Australia (Go-Set)	2
Australia (Kent Music Report)	3
Belgium (Ultratop 50)	21
Canada Top Singles (RPM)	1
Canada Adult Contemporary (RPM)	10
Chile	2
Italy (FIMI)	24
Malaysia	1
Netherlands (Dutch Top 40)	16
New Zealand (Recorded Music NZ)	6
South Africa (Springbok Radio)	7
US Billboard Hot 100	1
US Billboard Adult Contemporary	4
US Cash Box Top 100	1
US Record World Singles	1

=== Year-end charts ===
Chart (1971)	Position
Australia (Go-Set)	37
Belgium (Ultratop 50)	29
Canada	12
Netherlands (Dutch Top 40)	23
US Billboard Hot 100	5
US Adult Contemporary (Billboard)	15
US Cash Box Top 100	4

=== All-time charts ===
Chart (1958-2018)	Position
US Billboard Hot 100	438

== Certifications ==
=== Bee Gees version ===
Region	Certification	Certified units/sales
United States (RIAA)	Gold	1,000,000^{^}
^{^} Shipments figures based on certification alone.

=== Al Green version ===
Region	Certification	Certified units/sales
United Kingdom (BPI)	Silver	200,000^{‡}
^{‡} Sales+streaming figures based on certification alone.

== Other versions ==
1970s

- 1971: Johnny Mathis recorded a version of this song for his LP You've Got a Friend.
- 1972: Al Green recorded the song for his album Let's Stay Together and the song also appeared on the soundtracks of 1997's Good Will Hunting, 1999's The Virgin Suicides, 1999's Notting Hill and 2010's The Book of Eli. Green's cover was also featured in season 4 episode 2 of the American television series Atlanta. Green's version was released as a single in France on Cream Records. In 2008, Green's version was remade into a duet with Joss Stone for the soundtrack to the film adaptation of Sex and the City, with her vocals overdubbed onto the track.
- 1973: Cher covered the song on her 1973 album Half-Breed.
- 1975: Peter Yarrow covered the song on his 1975 album Love Songs.
- 1977: Florence Henderson performed the song during a medley on an episode of The Brady Bunch Variety Hour.

1980s

- 1982: Single released by Freddie McGregor on Music Lab, produced by Coxsone Dodd.
- 1984: Single release by Deirdre and Louise Rutkowski (later of 4AD supergroup This Mortal Coil) for their debut "In An Ideal World" (1984) with their first band Sunset Gun.
- 1985: Mexican Group El Tiempo recorded a Spanish-language version called "Cómo curar un corazón" on their album Cada día más

1990s

- 1991: Teddy Pendergrass recorded a version of this song on his LP Truly Blessed.

2000s

- 2001: A version made by Muzak played at the Austin J. Tobin Plaza on September 11 at around 8:48 AM, about 2 minutes after American Airlines Flight 11 crashed into the North Tower of the World Trade Center Complex.
- 2003: Michael Bublé recorded this song, with Barry Gibb performing backup vocals, on his self-titled album. Bublé's version reached number 22 on the US Billboard Adult Contemporary chart. It was Buble's first single.
- 2003: American Idol's second winner Ruben Studdard covered the song on his debut album Soulful.
- 2005: Mari Wilson, English pop and jazz singer, included a cover on her album Dolled Up.
- 2005: Steve Brookstein recorded it on his number-one album Heart and Soul.
- 2006: The song is covered in Julio Iglesias's album Romantic Classics.
- 2007: Barry Manilow's version appears on his album The Greatest Songs of the Seventies.
- 2009: Jazz singer-pianist Diana Krall covered this song on her album Quiet Nights.
- 2009: Rod Stewart recorded a version for his album Soulbook, though it was left off the final track listing.

2010s

- 2014: Eef Barzelay recorded a version for a fundraising CD titled More Super Hits of the Seventies for freeform radio station WFMU.
- 2017: Chris Stills recorded a version for the feature film I, Tonya.
- 2020: Kahil El'Zabar recorded an instrumental version titled "How Can We Mend Broken Heart" for his 2020 album America the Beautiful.
