= The Ultimate Bee Gees =

Compilation album by the Bee Gees
- Released: 3 November 2009
- Recorded: 1967–2001
- Genres: Rock; pop; disco
- Length: Disc 1: 78:48; Disc 2: 68:02
- Label: Reprise

The Bee Gees chronology
Love Songs (2005)	The Ultimate Bee Gees (2009)	Mythology (2010)

Professional ratings
Review scores
Source	Rating
AllMusic	5/5 stars

The Ultimate Bee Gees is a compilation album released to coincide with the 50th anniversary of the Bee Gees. Although the group did not start recording until 1963 on Festival Records in Australia, they began calling themselves the "Bee Gees" in 1959 after several name changes such as "Wee Johnny Hayes and the Bluecats", "The Rattlesnakes" and "BG's". Each disc is themed with the first containing more upbeat songs, called A Night Out, and the second containing slower songs and ballads, called A Night In, though the cover art does not distinguish this theme. Liner notes were written by Sir Tim Rice. This also marks the return of the 1970s era logo on an official Bee Gees release, which was last used on the Bee Gees' 1983 single "Someone Belonging to Someone".

== Track listing ==
Though every song in the Bee Gees catalogue since 1967 has been mixed in stereo, a few early tracks are presented here in the mono mixes heard on the original single releases, for the first time on a CD compilation (the mono mixes were previously released on CD on the 2006 box set Studio Albums 1967–1968).

All songs were written by Barry Gibb, Robin Gibb and Maurice Gibb, except where noted.

Disc one

No.	Title	Place of Origin	Length
1.	"You Should Be Dancing"	Children of the World, 1976	4:16
2.	"Stayin' Alive"	Saturday Night Fever soundtrack, 1977	4:43
3.	"Jive Talkin'"	Main Course, 1975	3:44
4.	"Nights on Broadway"	Main Course	4:33
5.	"Tragedy"	Spirits Having Flown, 1979	5:02
6.	"Night Fever"	Saturday Night Fever soundtrack	3:32
7.	"More Than a Woman"	Saturday Night Fever soundtrack	3:17
8.	"Fanny (Be Tender with My Love)"	Main Course	4:04
9.	"Spirits (Having Flown)"	Spirits Having Flown	5:11
10.	"If I Can't Have You"	B-side to the "Stayin' Alive" single, 1977	3:19
11.	"Boogie Child"	Children of the World	4:11
12.	"Love You Inside Out"	Spirits Having Flown	4:10
13.	"You Win Again"	E.S.P., 1987	4:00
14.	"One"	One, 1989	4:52
15.	"Secret Love"	High Civilization, 1991	3:32
16.	"Alone"	Still Waters, 1997	4:49
17.	"Still Waters (Run Deep)"	Still Waters	4:08
18.	"This Is Where I Came In"	This Is Where I Came In, 2001	4:52
19.	"Spicks and Specks" (Live) (B. Gibb)	Tales from the Brothers Gibb, 1990; originally from Spicks and Specks, 1966	2:25

Disc two

No.	Title	Place of Origin	Length
1.	"How Deep Is Your Love"	Saturday Night Fever soundtrack	4:02
2.	"To Love Somebody" (B. Gibb, R. Gibb)	Bee Gees' 1st, 1967	3:00
3.	"Words" (Mono mix)	Non-album single, 1968	3:17
4.	"How Can You Mend a Broken Heart"	Trafalgar, 1971	3:58
5.	"Too Much Heaven"	Spirits Having Flown	4:55
6.	"Emotion" (B. Gibb, R. Gibb)	Their Greatest Hits: The Record, 2001	3:39
7.	"Lonely Days"	2 Years On, 1970	3:47
8.	"Run to Me"	To Whom It May Concern, 1972	3:12
9.	"Love So Right"	Children of the World	3:37
10.	"For Whom the Bell Tolls" (Single edit)	Size Isn't Everything, 1993	3:58
11.	"I've Gotta Get a Message to You" (Mono single mix)	Idea, 1968	3:03
12.	"New York Mining Disaster 1941" (Mono mix) (B. Gibb, R. Gibb)	Bee Gees' 1st	2:10
13.	"Massachusetts" (Mono mix)	Horizontal, 1968	2:21
14.	"I Started a Joke"	Idea	3:08
15.	"World" (Mono mix)	Horizontal	3:17
16.	"First of May" (Mono mix)	Odessa, 1969	2:50
17.	"Holiday" (B. Gibb, R. Gibb)	Bee Gees' 1st	2:55
18.	"Don't Forget to Remember" (B. Gibb, M. Gibb)	Cucumber Castle, 1970	3:31
19.	"Islands in the Stream" (Live)	One Night Only, 1998	3:46
20.	"Heartbreaker" (Live)	One Night Only	1:05
21.	"Guilty" (Live)	One Night Only	2:23

Bonus track on Japanese releases Rhino Records WPCR-13706-7 and WPZR-30352-4

No.	Title	Place of Origin	Length
22.	"Melody Fair"	Odessa	3:48

== DVD bonus disc ==
The Ultimate Bee Gees [Deluxe Edition] came with a bonus DVD containing promotional clips and videos. Though the promo clip for "Tomorrow, Tomorrow" is included on the DVD, the song is not included in the collection. All tracks are original studio recordings unless otherwise noted.

1. "Spicks and Specks" – Promo clip aired on Bandstand (Australia) – 19 November 1966
2. "New York Mining Disaster 1941" Promo clip – 1967 (Mono album version)
3. "Massachusetts" – Performed live on Top of the Pops UK TV – 26 December 1967
4. "I've Gotta Get a Message to You" – from Idea TV Special – 1968 (Mono single mix)
5. "Tomorrow, Tomorrow" – Promo clip – 1969
6. "Lonely Days" – Promo clip – 1970 (Alternate studio version)
7. "How Can You Mend a Broken Heart" – Performed live on Whitaker's World of Music – 6/5/1971
8. "Run to Me" – Performed live on In Session US TV – 1973
9. "Jive Talkin'" – Promo clip – 1975
10. "Night Fever" – Promo clip – 1977
11. "Stayin' Alive" – Promo clip – 1977 (Slightly sped up studio version)
12. "How Deep Is Your Love" – Promo clip – 1977 (Slightly sped up studio version)
13. "Too Much Heaven" – Promo clip – 1979
14. "For Whom the Bell Tolls" – Promo clip – 1993
15. "Alone" – Promo clip – 1997
16. "Still Waters (Run Deep)" – Promo clip – 1997
17. "You Win Again" – Promo clip – 1987
18. "One" – Promo clip – 1989 (Version 1)

== Charts ==
Though there were not any new songs included in this compilation and there was little promotion for it, the set charted in the UK at No. 19 in its first week and in the US at No. 116 on the Billboard 200 top albums chart.

In May 2012, The Ultimate Bee Gees re-entered the Billboard 200 at No. 49 due to a huge increase in Bee Gees' album sales following the death of Robin Gibb.

Weekly charts

Chart (2009–2012)	Peak position
Australian Albums (ARIA)	7
Austrian Albums (Ö3 Austria)	25
French Albums (SNEP)	52
German Albums (Offizielle Top 100)	32
Dutch Albums (Album Top 100)	83
New Zealand Albums (RMNZ)	10
Norwegian Albums (VG-lista)	28
Swiss Albums (Schweizer Hitparade)	44

Chart (2020–2021)	Peak position
Canadian Albums (Billboard)	89
Swiss Albums (Schweizer Hitparade)	38

Year-end charts

Chart (2012)	Position
Australian Albums (ARIA)	74

== Certifications ==
Certifications for The Ultimate Bee Gees
Region	Certification	Certified units/sales
Denmark (IFPI Danmark)	Gold	10,000^{‡}
^{‡} Sales+streaming figures based on certification alone.
