= Love Songs (Bee Gees album) =

Compilation album by the Bee Gees
- Released: November 28, 2005 (UK); December 6, 2005 (US)
- Recorded: April 1967 – November 1999
- Genre: Rock, pop, disco
- Length: 69:42 (US)
- Label: Universal; Reprise (re-release)
- Producer: Bee Gees; Albhy Galuten; Karl Richardson; Robert Stigwood

The Bee Gees chronology
Number Ones (2004)	Love Songs (2005)	The Ultimate Bee Gees (2009)

Love Songs is a compilation album by the Bee Gees, released in 2005. A proposed album of love songs was in the works around 1995 when the Bee Gees recorded their own versions of "Heartbreaker" and "Emotion", but that project was soon shelved and those recordings remained unavailable until the release of Their Greatest Hits: The Record in 2001.

Following the success of the Number Ones compilation in 2004, Universal once again tried to mine the Bee Gees catalog, this time focusing on their ballads. Spanning their entire career, Love Songs features many of the group's big hits, but also includes some lesser known tracks such as "Secret Love" and "For Whom the Bell Tolls", which were both big hits in Europe. Also included is a live version of "Islands in the Stream".

The US and the UK versions differed slightly in song selection and running time. Included on the UK version were 1993's "Heart Like Mine" and a song Barry and Maurice wrote together with Ronan Keating in 1999 called "Lovers and Friends", backing Keating both vocally and instrumentally while also producing the recording. Another anomaly was the inclusion of the Robin Gibb solo hit "Juliet" from 1983, which was a big hit in many countries, except in the UK and the US.

By the time Love Songs was released, there had been several Bee Gees compilations on the market as well as their entire back catalog, so this release seemed somewhat redundant. In the US it did chart but only managed to reach No. 166. In their homeland it climbed to No. 51 on the UK Albums Chart, but its best showing was in the Netherlands where it went top 20, peaking at No. 21.

== Track listing ==
USA/International

1. "To Love Somebody" (Bee Gees' 1st)
2. "Words" (Horizontal)
3. "First of May" (Odessa)
4. "Lonely Days" (2 Years On)
5. "How Can You Mend a Broken Heart" (Trafalgar)
6. "How Deep Is Your Love" (Saturday Night Fever soundtrack)
7. "More Than a Woman" (Saturday Night Fever soundtrack)
8. "(Our Love) Don't Throw It All Away" (Bee Gees Greatest)
9. "Emotion" (Their Greatest Hits: The Record)
10. "Too Much Heaven" (Spirits Having Flown)
11. "Heartbreaker" (Their Greatest Hits: The Record)
12. "Islands in the Stream" (Live) (One Night Only)
13. "Juliet" (How Old Are You?) - Robin Gibb solo track)
14. "Secret Love" (High Civilization)
15. "For Whom the Bell Tolls" (Size Isn't Everything)
16. "Closer Than Close" (Still Waters)
17. "I Could Not Love You More" (Still Waters)
18. "Wedding Day" (This Is Where I Came In)

UK/Japan

1. "To Love Somebody"
2. "Words"
3. "First of May"
4. "Lonely Days"
5. "How Can You Mend a Broken Heart"
6. "How Deep Is Your Love"
7. "More Than a Woman"
8. "(Our Love) Don't Throw It All Away"
9. "Emotion"
10. "Too Much Heaven"
11. "Heartbreaker"
12. "Islands in the Stream (Live)"
13. "Juliet"
14. "Secret Love"
15. "For Whom the Bell Tolls"
16. "Heart Like Mine" (Bonus track) (Size Isn't Everything)
17. "Closer Than Close"
18. "I Could Not Love You More"
19. "Wedding Day"
20. "Lovers and Friends" (featuring Ronan Keating) – 5:17 (bonus track; new song)

PRC

1. "To Love Somebody"
2. "Words"
3. "First of May"
4. "Lonely Days"
5. "How Can You Mend a Broken Heart"
6. "How Deep Is Your Love"
7. "More Than a Woman"
8. "(Our Love) Don't Throw It All Away"
9. "Emotion"
10. "Too Much Heaven"
11. "Heartbreaker"
12. "Juliet"
13. "Secret Love"
14. "For Whom the Bell Tolls"
15. "Closer Than Close"
16. "I Could Not Love You More"
17. "Wedding Day"

== Charts ==
Chart performance for Love Songs
Chart (2005–2006)	Peak position
Australian Albums (ARIA)	84
Canadian Albums (Nielsen SoundScan)	63
Dutch Albums (Album Top 100)	21
Italian Albums (FIMI)	79
UK Albums (OCC)	51
US Billboard 200	166
