= Their Greatest Hits: The Record =

Compilation album by the Bee Gees
- Released: 20 November 2001
- Recorded: June 1966 – 2001
- Genre: Pop, rock, rhythm and blues, disco
- Length: 150:27
- Label: Polydor
- Producer: Bee Gees; Reprise (US)

The Bee Gees chronology
| This Is Where I Came In (2001) | Their Greatest Hits: The Record (2001) | Number Ones (2004) |

Professional ratings
Review scores
| Source | Rating |
|---|---|
| AllMusic | 5/5 stars |
| The Rolling Stone Album Guide | 4/5 stars |

Their Greatest Hits: The Record is the career retrospective greatest hits album by the Bee Gees, released on UTV Records and Polydor in November 2001 as HDCD. The album includes 40 tracks spanning over 35 years of music. Four of the songs were new recordings of classic Gibb compositions originally recorded by other artists, including "Emotion" (Samantha Sang), "Heartbreaker" (Dionne Warwick), "Islands in the Stream" (Kenny Rogers and Dolly Parton), and "Immortality" (Celine Dion). It also features the Barry Gibb duet with Barbra Streisand, "Guilty", which originally appeared on Streisand's 1980 album of the same name. It is currently out of print and has been supplanted by another compilation, The Ultimate Bee Gees.

The album peaked at No. 5 twice in the UK, the first time upon its release in 2001 and again in January 2003 (following the death of Maurice Gibb). It has since been certified triple platinum by the BPI for sales of over 900,000 copies.

In the US, the album debuted on the Billboard 200 album chart at No. 49. It spent a total of 40 weeks on the chart and was certified platinum by the RIAA in February 2002 for sales of over one million copies there.

There are two bonus songs on the Japanese release, "Melody Fair" and "My World" (the latter is also a bonus track on the UK release along with "Jumbo"). Copies sold at the American retailer Target included a bonus disc entitled 5 Live Recordings.

== Details ==
Most of the songs are in chronological order, except for the placements of "You Should Be Dancing", which was released before "Love So Right", and "Spicks and Specks", a song from 1966 that ends disc two, which makes it something of a bonus track.

"Emotion" and "Heartbreaker" were recorded in 1994 as part of a Bee Gees compilation album called Love Songs which was planned for release in 1995. "Islands in the Stream" was recorded in 2001 with Robin singing lead in a contemporary R&B sound rather than the more traditional arrangement like that heard on One Night Only, which had Barry singing lead (Barry did not perform vocals on this revised version). "Immortality" is the original writing demo from 1996, which includes Barry singing in high falsetto as a guide to Celine Dion who would go on to record the song in 1997.

The very first UK pressings used the wrong version of "How Can You Mend a Broken Heart" with Barry singing the opening verse. A mastering fault was also present in "More Than a Woman", with the audio noticeably dipping to the right briefly during the first verse. These were corrected after several thousand copies had already been distributed.

== Track listing ==
All compositions by Barry, Robin and Maurice Gibb, except as indicated. ** Only appears in Japan Bonus Tracks version.

Disc one

1. "New York Mining Disaster 1941" (B. Gibb/R. Gibb) – 2:12
2. "To Love Somebody" (B. Gibb/R. Gibb) – 3:02
3. "Holiday" (B. Gibb/R. Gibb) – 2:55
4. "Massachusetts" – 2:25
5. "World" – 3:16
6. "Words" – 3:17
7. "I've Gotta Get a Message to You" – 2:52
8. "I Started a Joke" – 3:09
9. "First of May" – 2:50
10. "Melody Fair" – 3:48 ** "Jumbo" – 2:08 in UK
11. "Saved by the Bell" (R. Gibb) – 3:08
12. "Don't Forget to Remember" (B. Gibb/M. Gibb) – 3:29
13. "Lonely Days" – 3:48
14. "How Can You Mend a Broken Heart" (B. Gibb/R. Gibb) – 3:59
15. "My World" (B. Gibb/R. Gibb) – 4:22 **
16. "Run to Me" – 3:13
17. "Jive Talkin'" – 3:46
18. "Nights on Broadway" – 4:36
19. "Fanny (Be Tender with My Love)" – 4:04
20. "Love So Right" – 3:37
21. "If I Can't Have You" – 3:22
22. "Love Me" (B. Gibb/R. Gibb) – 4:04
23. "You Should Be Dancing" – 4:15

US Disc one length: 71:18

UK Disc one length: 77:51

Japan Disc one length: 79:32

Disc two

1. "Stayin' Alive" – 4:47
2. "How Deep Is Your Love" – 4:03
3. "Night Fever" – 3:31
4. "More Than a Woman" – 3:17
5. "Emotion" (B. Gibb/R. Gibb) – 3:38
6. "Too Much Heaven" – 4:57
7. "Tragedy" – 5:03
8. "Love You Inside Out" – 4:11
9. "Guilty" (performed by Barbra Streisand and Barry Gibb) – 4:24
10. "Heartbreaker" – 4:26
11. "Islands in the Stream" (B. Gibb/R. Gibb/M. Gibb/Praskazrel Michel) – 4:22
12. "You Win Again" – 4:04
13. "One" – 4:56
14. "Secret Love" – 3:36
15. "For Whom the Bell Tolls" (Single version) – 3:58
16. "Alone" (Single version) – 4:22
17. "Immortality" (Demo version) – 4:15
18. "This Is Where I Came In" (Single version) – 4:00
19. "Spicks and Specks" (B. Gibb) – 2:51

Disc two length: 78:43

Bonus disc
5 Live Recordings

1. "Massachusetts" – 2:42
2. "To Love Somebody" – 2:52
3. "Jive Talkin'" – 4:35
4. "How Can You Mend a Broken Heart" – 3:38
5. "How Deep Is Your Love" – 3:59

== Charts ==
=== Weekly charts ===
| Chart (2001–2002) | Peak position |
|---|---|
| Australian Albums (ARIA) | 2 |
| Austrian Albums (Ö3 Austria) | 14 |
| Belgian Albums (Ultratop Flanders) | 17 |
| Belgian Albums (Ultratop Wallonia) | 13 |
| Danish Albums (Hitlisten) | 2 |
| European Albums (Music & Media) | 6 |
| Finnish Albums (Suomen virallinen lista) | 21 |
| German Albums (Offizielle Top 100) | 10 |
| Irish Albums (IRMA) | 7 |
| Italian Albums (FIMI) | 18 |
| New Zealand Albums (RMNZ) | 1 |
| Norwegian Albums (VG-lista) | 9 |
| Swedish Albums (Sverigetopplistan) | 35 |
| Swiss Albums (Schweizer Hitparade) | 11 |
| UK Albums (OCC) | 5 |
| US Billboard 200 | 49 |

| Chart (2003) | Peak position |
|---|---|
| Dutch Albums (Album Top 100) | 2 |

| Chart (2006) | Peak position |
|---|---|
| Portuguese Albums (AFP) | 6 |

=== Year-end charts ===
| Chart (2001) | Position |
|---|---|
| Australian Albums (ARIA) | 42 |
| Dutch Albums (Album Top 100) | 100 |
| UK Albums (OCC) | 24 |

| Chart (2002) | Position |
|---|---|
| Australian Albums (ARIA) | 36 |
| Dutch Albums (Album Top 100) | 37 |
| UK Albums (OCC) | 125 |

| Chart (2003) | Position |
|---|---|
| Dutch Albums (Album Top 100) | 51 |
| New Zealand Albums (RMNZ) | 26 |
| UK Albums (OCC) | 82 |

=== Decade-end chart ===
| Chart (2000–2009) | Position |
|---|---|
| Australian Albums (ARIA) | 73 |

== Certifications and sales ==
| Region | Certification | Certified units/sales |
|---|---|---|
| Australia (ARIA) | 3× Platinum | 210,000^{^} |
| Belgium (BRMA) | Gold | 25,000^{*} |
| Brazil (Pro-Música Brasil) | 2× Platinum | 250,000^{*} |
| Denmark (IFPI Danmark) | Platinum | 50,000^{^} |
| Germany (BVMI) | Gold | 150,000^{‡} |
| Netherlands (NVPI) | Gold | 40,000^{^} |
| New Zealand (RMNZ) | 8× Platinum | 120,000^{^} |
| Norway (IFPI Norway) | Gold | 25,000^{*} |
| Spain (PROMUSICAE) | Gold | 50,000^{^} |
| Switzerland (IFPI Switzerland) | Gold | 20,000^{^} |
| United Kingdom (BPI) | 3× Platinum | 1,300,000 |
| United States (RIAA) | Platinum | 500,000^{^} |
Summaries
| Europe (IFPI) | Platinum | 1,000,000^{*} |
| Worldwide | — | 2,300,000 |
^{*} Sales figures based on certification alone.^{^} Shipments figures based on certification alone.^{‡} Sales+streaming figures based on certification alone.
