= Number Ones (Bee Gees album) =

Compilation album by the Bee Gees
- Released: 1 November 2004
- Recorded: August 1967 – September 2001
- Genre: Pop, rock, rhythm and blues, disco
- Length: 77:29
- Label: Universal
- Producer: Bee Gees, Various

The Bee Gees chronology
Their Greatest Hits: The Record (2001)	Number Ones (2004)	Love Songs (2005)

Professional ratings
Review scores
Source	Rating
AllMusic	4/5 stars

Number Ones is a compilation album by the Bee Gees released in 2004. It includes 18 of their greatest hits, plus a lead vocal track by band member Maurice Gibb, who died in 2003. “Man in the Middle” was originally included as a tribute to Maurice, but it would eventually, and unexpectedly, match the album’s theme when the song reached number 1 in Turkey in March 2005. It is the final Bee Gees album released by Universal Records.

Rhino Records re-released Number Ones worldwide in 2008 using the European track list. Combining sales of versions issued by two different record companies, it has sold 1,236,000 copies in the US as of August 2012. The set, which peaked at No. 23 in the US on the Billboard 200 albums chart in 2004, re-entered the charts peaking at No. 5 in 2012.

The following week, after peaking at No. 5, the album plummeted to No. 195, the second-greatest drop for an album that still remained on the chart in Billboard album history. This gives the group a span of 44 years, 9 months since their first Top 10 album, 1967's Bee Gees' 1st, which peaked at No. 7 in November 1967. The only other groups with longer spans are the Beach Boys (49 years 1 week), the Beatles (47 years 7 months), and the Rolling Stones (45 years 6 months).

== Track listing ==
American release

1. "Massachusetts" (1967) – 2:26
2. "World" (1967) – 3:16
3. "Words" (1968) – 3:17
4. "I've Gotta Get a Message to You" (1968) – 2:52
5. "I Started a Joke" (1968) – 3:10
6. "Don't Forget to Remember" (1969) – 3:29
7. "Lonely Days" (1970) – 3:48
8. "How Can You Mend a Broken Heart" (1971) – 3:58
9. "Jive Talkin'" (1975) – 3:46
10. "You Should Be Dancing" (1976) – 4:17
11. "Love So Right" (1976) – 3:37
12. "How Deep Is Your Love" (1977) – 4:02
13. "Stayin' Alive" (1977) – 4:44
14. "Night Fever" (1977) – 3:33
15. "Too Much Heaven" (1978) – 4:54
16. "Tragedy" (1979) – 5:03
17. "Love You Inside Out" (1979) – 4:12
18. "You Win Again" (1987) – 4:04
19. "Man in the Middle" (2001) – 4:22

European/Australian release

Two of the bonus tracks were new recordings of classic Gibb compositions originally recorded by other artists, including "Islands in the Stream" (Kenny Rogers and Dolly Parton), and "Immortality" (Celine Dion).

1. "Massachusetts" – 2:26
2. "World" – 3:16
3. "Words" – 3:17
4. "I've Gotta Get a Message to You" – 2:52
5. "I Started a Joke" – 3:10
6. "Don't Forget to Remember" – 3:29
7. "How Can You Mend a Broken Heart" – 3:58
8. "Jive Talkin'" – 3:46
9. "You Should Be Dancing" – 4:17
10. "How Deep Is Your Love" – 4:02
11. "Stayin' Alive" – 4:44
12. "Night Fever" – 3:33
13. "Too Much Heaven" – 4:54
14. "Tragedy" – 5:03
15. "More Than a Woman" (1977) – 3:18
16. "Love You Inside Out" – 4:12
17. "You Win Again" – 4:04
18. "Man in the Middle" – 4:22*
19. "Islands in the Stream" (2001) – 4:22*
20. "Immortality" (original demo version) (1996) – 4:16*
- 19/20: Bonus tracks
- 18: Special Maurice Gibb tribute track

== List of number one singles as performers ==
Song title	Country
"Spicks and Specks"	New Zealand
"World"	Germany, Holland
"Massachusetts"	Chile, UK, Germany, Holland, Norway, Australia, New Zealand, South Africa, Japan, Malaysia, Singapore
"Words"	Germany, Holland, Switzerland
"I've Gotta Get a Message to You"	UK, Italy, Ireland
"I Started a Joke"	New Zealand, Canada
"Saved by the Bell" (Robin Gibb solo)	Holland, Ireland, South Africa
"Don't Forget to Remember"	Holland, Ireland, New Zealand, South Africa
"Lonely Days"	Canada
"How Can You Mend a Broken Heart"	USA, Canada
"My World"	Hong Kong
"Saw a New Morning"	Hong Kong
"Wouldn't I Be Someone"	Hong Kong
"Jive Talkin'"	USA, Canada
"You Should Be Dancing"	USA
"Love So Right"	Brazil
"How Deep Is Your Love"	USA, Chile, France, Ireland, Spain
"Stayin' Alive"	USA, Canada, Brazil, Chile, Mexico, Holland, Italy, France, Spain, Australia, New Zealand, South Africa
"Night Fever"	USA, Canada, Brazil, UK, Spain, Ireland
"Too Much Heaven"	USA, Brazil, Argentina, Chile, Italy, Spain, Norway, New Zealand, South Africa, Sweden
"Tragedy"	USA, UK, Italy, Spain, Ireland, France, New Zealand
"Love You Inside Out"	USA
"He's a Liar"	Greece
"Juliet" (Robin Gibb solo)	Germany, Italy, Switzerland
"You Win Again"	UK, Germany, Denmark, Ireland, Norway, Switzerland, Austria, Luxembourg, Hong Kong
"One"	Brazil
"For Whom the Bell Tolls"	Brazil
"Alone"	Hong Kong, Malaysia, Thailand
"Immortality" (with Celine Dion)	Brazil
"Man in the Middle"	Türkiye (Turkey)

== Charts ==
=== Weekly charts ===
Chart (2004)	Peak position
Austrian Albums (Ö3 Austria)	32
Belgian Albums (Ultratop Wallonia)	72
Danish Albums (Hitlisten)	19
German Albums (Offizielle Top 100)	43
Italian Albums (FIMI)	18
New Zealand Albums (RMNZ)	10
Swedish Albums (Sverigetopplistan)	39
Swiss Albums (Schweizer Hitparade)	22

Chart (2005)	Peak position
Belgian Albums (Ultratop Flanders)	29
Dutch Albums (Album Top 100)	32

Chart (2012)	Peak position
Australian Albums (ARIA)	17
Irish Albums (IRMA)	1
UK Albums (OCC)	4
US Billboard 200	5
US Top Catalog Albums (Billboard)	1

=== Year-end charts ===
Chart (2011)	Position
UK Albums (OCC)	153
Chart (2012)	Position
UK Albums (OCC)	50

== Certifications ==
Region	Certification	Certified units/sales
Australia (ARIA)	Platinum	70,000^{^}
Ireland (IRMA)	Platinum	15,000^{^}
New Zealand (RMNZ)	Platinum	15,000^{^}
United Kingdom (BPI)	Platinum	300,000^{^}
United States (RIAA)	Gold	1,236,000
^{^} Shipments figures based on certification alone.
