= Greatest (Bee Gees album) =

Compilation album by the Bee Gees
- Released: October 1979
- Recorded: January 1975 – November 1978
- Genres: Pop; rock; disco
- Length: 82:55
- Label: RSO
- Producers: Bee Gees; Albhy Galuten; Karl Richardson; Arif Mardin

The Bee Gees chronology
Spirits Having Flown (1979)	Greatest (1979)	Living Eyes (1981)

Singles from Bee Gees Greatest
- 1. "Spirits (Having Flown)" Released: December 1979

Greatest is a greatest hits album by the Bee Gees. Released by RSO Records in October 1979, the album is a retrospective of the group's material from 1975 to 1979. The album topped Billboard's Top LP's & Tape chart for the week of 12 January 1980. A remastered and expanded version of the album was released by Reprise Records in 2007.

Professional ratings
Review scores
Source	Rating
AllMusic	4.5/5 stars
Christgau's Record Guide	B+
The Rolling Stone Album Guide	3.5/5 stars

== Content ==
The original release was a double album, with album sleeves and labels featuring pictures of each brother on the label and all three brothers on side four, while each record sleeve was adorned with the Bee Gees Greatest logo.

Side one contains disco tracks featuring "Jive Talkin'", "Night Fever", "Tragedy", "You Should Be Dancing" and "Stayin' Alive".

Side two contains ballads and featured "How Deep Is Your Love", "Too Much Heaven", "Love So Right", "(Our Love) Don't Throw It All Away" and "Fanny (Be Tender with My Love)".

Side three consists of B-sides and album tracks such as "If I Can't Have You", "You Stepped into My Life", "Love Me", "More Than a Woman" and "Rest Your Love on Me". Side three also consists of songs that spawned cover versions for other artists. Side four contains "Nights on Broadway", "Spirits (Having Flown)", "Wind of Change", "Love You Inside Out" and "Children of the World".

This album featured the debut of the Bee Gees' recording of "(Our Love) Don't Throw It All Away"; written by Barry and backing keyboardist Blue Weaver, it had been a hit for the Bee Gees' brother Andy Gibb.

Two Top 40 charting singles, "Boogie Child" (#12) and "Edge of the Universe (Live)" (#26) were omitted in favor of tracks that other artists had hits with such as "Love Me" and "If I Can't Have You" (Yvonne Elliman) and "You Stepped into My Life" (Melba Moore and Wayne Newton).

"Boogie Child" reached slightly higher on the Billboard Hot 100 than Yvonne Elliman's version of "Love Me" (#14), while Melba Moore's and Wayne Newton's recordings of "You Stepped into My Life" only peaked at 47 and 90, respectively, in 1979.

"Boogie Child" did appear in the box set Tales from the Brothers Gibb, but it was again passed over on the double disc set Their Greatest Hits: The Record from 2001.

== Reissues ==
Greatest was released on CD as a two-disc set in 1987, but was deleted briefly with the release of The Record in 2001.

On 18 September 2007, Reprise Records released a remastered and expanded version of Greatest. Many of the tracks on Greatest have been previously remastered, but the album contains the first release of remastered versions of "You Stepped into My Life", "Rest Your Love on Me", "Wind of Change", "Spirits (Having Flown)", and "Children of the World".

In addition, there are extended versions of "Stayin' Alive" and an unreleased Bee Gees track, "Warm Ride", which was written for the group Rare Earth. The song ended up being recorded by brother Andy Gibb for his album, After Dark. The re-release contains new mixes of "You Should Be Dancing", "If I Can't Have You", "Night Fever" and "More Than a Woman" and as a hidden track, a new mix of "Stayin' Alive".

Greatest topped the Billboard album charts early in 1980, becoming their third consecutive number one album. The re-issue of Bee Gees Greatest debuted at No. 1 on Billboard's Pop Catalog charts for the week of 30 September 2007. There was some question as to whether Billboard was going to treat this as a new release or a re-issue. Billboard's unofficial policy states an album requires at least 33% new material to qualify as a new release; Greatest contains about 28% new material, thus making it a re-issue. The set scanned over 20,000 copies for the week, making it the 35th best selling album in the country, good enough to place in Billboard's Top 40.

== Track listing ==
All tracks were written by Barry, Robin and Maurice Gibb, except where noted.

Side one
No.	Title	Length
1.	"Jive Talkin'"	3:43
2.	"Night Fever"	3:33
3.	"Tragedy"	5:03
4.	"You Should Be Dancing"	4:16
5.	"Stayin' Alive"	4:43

Side two
No.	Title	Writer(s)	Length
1.	"How Deep Is Your Love"		4:03
2.	"Love So Right"		3:34
3.	"Too Much Heaven"		4:55
4.	"(Our Love) Don't Throw it All Away" (Previously unreleased)	B. Gibb; Blue Weaver	4:02
5.	"Fanny (Be Tender with My Love)"		4:02

Side three
No.	Title	Writer(s)	Length
1.	"If I Can't Have You"		3:25
2.	"You Stepped into My Life"		3:25
3.	"Love Me"	B. Gibb; R. Gibb	4:01
4.	"More Than a Woman"		3:15
5.	"Rest Your Love on Me"	B. Gibb	4:20

Side four
No.	Title	Writer(s)	Length
1.	"Nights on Broadway"		4:31
2.	"Spirits (Having Flown)"		5:19
3.	"Love You Inside Out"		4:11
4.	"Wind of Change"	B. Gibb; R. Gibb	4:54
5.	"Children of the World"		3:07

=== 2007 re-issue edition ===
Disc one
No.	Title	Writer(s)	Length
1.	"Jive Talkin'"		3:43
2.	"Night Fever"		3:33
3.	"Tragedy"		5:03
4.	"You Should Be Dancing"		4:16
5.	"Stayin' Alive"		4:43
6.	"How Deep Is Your Love"		4:03
7.	"Love So Right"		3:34
8.	"Too Much Heaven"		4:55
9.	"(Our Love) Don't Throw It All Away"	B. Gibb; Weaver	4:02
10.	"Fanny (Be Tender with My Love)"		4:02
11.	"Warm Ride" (Bonus track; previously unreleased)		3:16
12.	"Stayin' Alive (Promo 12" version)" (Bonus track)		6:59

Disc two
No.	Title	Writer(s)	Length
1.	"If I Can't Have You"		3:25
2.	"You Stepped into My Life"		3:25
3.	"Love Me"	B. Gibb; R. Gibb	4:01
4.	"More Than a Woman"		3:15
5.	"Rest Your Love on Me"	B. Gibb	4:20
6.	"Nights on Broadway"		4:31
7.	"Spirits (Having Flown)"		5:19
8.	"Love You Inside Out"		4:11
9.	"Wind of Change"	B. Gibb; R. Gibb	4:54
10.	"Children of the World"		3:07
11.	"You Should Be Dancing (Jason Bentley/Philip Steir remix)" (Bonus track)		4:46
12.	"If I Can't Have You (Count Da Money remix)" (Bonus track)		4:10
13.	"Night Fever (GRN remix)" (Bonus track)		4:44
14.	"How Deep Is Your Love (Supreme Beings of Leisure remix)" (Bonus track)		4:39
15.	"Stayin' Alive (Teddybears remix)" (Bonus track) (Hidden track on some editions)		3:23
16.	"If I Can't Have You (The Disco Boys remix)" (Bonus track on some editions)		6:41

== Charts ==
=== Weekly charts ===
Chart (1979–1980)	Peak position
Australian Albums (Kent Music Report)	1
Canadian Albums (RPM)	4
German Albums (Offizielle Top 100)	43
New Zealand Albums (RMNZ)	2
UK Albums (Official Charts)	6
US Billboard 200	1

Chart (2007)	Peak position
Austrian Albums (Ö3 Austria)	4
Belgian Albums (Ultratop Wallonia)	65
Danish Albums (Hitlisten)	25
Dutch Albums (Album Top 100)	35
French Compilations (SNEP)	5
Irish Albums (IRMA)	4
Italian Albums (FIMI)	92
Spanish Albums (Promusicae)	11
Swedish Albums (Sverigetopplistan)	24
Swiss Albums (Schweizer Hitparade)	60

=== Year-end charts ===
Chart (1980)	Position
Canada Top Albums/CDs (RPM)	23
US Billboard 200	33

== Certifications ==
Region	Certification	Certified units/sales
Australia	—	215,000
Canada (Music Canada)	2× Platinum	200,000^{^}
Ireland (IRMA)	Platinum	15,000^{^}
New Zealand (RMNZ)	Platinum	15,000^{^}
Spain (Promusicae)	Platinum	100,000^{^}
United Kingdom (BPI)	Platinum	300,000^{^}
United States (RIAA)	2× Platinum	2,000,000^{^}
^{^} Shipments figures based on certification alone.
