= I Can't Help It (Andy Gibb and Olivia Newton-John song) =

1980 single by Andy Gibb and Olivia Newton-John

Single by Andy Gibb and Olivia Newton-John

from the album After Dark
- B-side: "Someone I Ain't"
- Released: March 1980
- Recorded: 1979
- Genre: Soft rock
- Length: 4:08 (album version); 3:46 (promo version)
- Label: RSO
- Songwriter: Barry Gibb
- Producer: Gibb-Galuten-Richardson

Andy Gibb singles chronology
"Desire" (1980)	"I Can't Help It" (1980)	"Rest Your Love on Me" (1980)

Olivia Newton-John singles chronology
"Totally Hot" (1979)	"I Can't Help It" (1980)	"Rest Your Love on Me" (1980)

"I Can't Help It" is a song performed by English musician Andy Gibb and British-Australian singer Olivia Newton-John. It was released in March 1980 as the second single from Gibb's third and final studio album After Dark. The song was written by Barry Gibb and produced by the production trio Gibb-Galuten-Richardson, of which Barry Gibb was a founding member.

== Charts ==
Chart (1980)	Peak position
Australia (Kent Music Report)	62
Belgium	27
Canada (RPM) Top Singles	32
Canada Adult Contemporary (RPM)	3
Israel (Israeli Singles Chart)	6
Spain	23
US Billboard Hot 100	12
US Billboard Adult Contemporary	8
US Cash Box	13
US Radio & Records	17
US Record World	17
Quebec (ADISQ)	18

== Popular culture ==
In 1984, Gibb performed this song on the sitcom Punky Brewster in the episode "Play It Again, Punky" where Gibb guest starred as Punky's piano teacher.
