= One Night Only (Bee Gees album) =

Live album by the Bee Gees

Live album by the Bee Gees
- Released: 7 September 1998
- Recorded: 14 November 1997
- Venue: MGM Grand, Las Vegas, Nevada
- Genre: Pop, disco, soft rock
- Length: 78:00
- Label: Polydor
- Producer: Bee Gees

The Bee Gees chronology
| Still Waters (1997) | One Night Only (1998) | This Is Where I Came In (2001) |

One Night Only

Video by the Bee Gees
- Released: 24 November 1998
- Recorded: November 14, 1997
- Venue: MGM Grand Garden Arena, Las Vegas, Nevada
- Length: 110 min.
- Label: Eagle Vision
- Director: Michael Simon
- Producer: Nancy Riggs, Harry Sandler

The Bee Gees chronology
| Keppel Road: The Life and Music of the Bee Gees (1997) | One Night Only (1998) | This Is Where I Came In - The Official Story of the Bee Gees (2001) |

Professional ratings
Review scores
| Source | Rating |
|---|---|
| AllMusic | 3/5 stars |
| Muzykalnaya Gazeta | positive |
| The Rolling Stone Album Guide | 3/5 stars |

One Night Only is a live album and DVD/Blu-ray by the Bee Gees. It features the group's concert at the MGM Grand in Las Vegas on November 14, 1997 and includes many of their greatest hits.

The CD is edited, with some songs omitted, though the DVD version of the concert is complete. A reissue of the album was released in 1999, and includes a bonus CD with the missing songs. The CD and DVD cover features the band replicating their iconic Saturday Night Fever pose. The concert was re-released on SD Blu-ray by Eagle Rock Entertainment in 2013. The re-release provides superior audio quality than what is possible on DVD, but video is only marginally improved (the standard-definition video is now up-scaled to 1080i).

The album features songs from every decade from the 1960s to the '90s. It includes a tribute song to the Gibbs' late brother Andy Gibb, "(Our Love) Don't Throw It All Away". During this song old footage of Andy is shown, including him singing the second verse of the song. The vocals from the original recording also play during that section. Céline Dion guest-stars on the Bee Gees-penned "Immortality". Recorded vocals by Frankie Valli are featured during "Grease", taken from the original recording.

The album's title was originally meant to reflect the band's plan that the Las Vegas concert would be their final live performance ever. Barry Gibb's arthritis in his back had worsened to the point where it seemed it would be impossible for him to continue playing. He nonetheless wanted to expand the tour, so they played several more shows, holding one every two weeks so that Barry would be able to recover from his injury.

== Track listing ==
All songs by Barry, Robin and Maurice Gibb, except where noted.

1. "Intro: You Should Be Dancing/Alone" – 5:47
2. "Massachusetts" – 2:32
3. "To Love Somebody" (B. Gibb, R. Gibb) – 3:10
4. "Words" – 3:27
5. "Closer Than Close" – 3:30
6. "Islands in the Stream" – 3:47
7. "(Our Love) Don't Throw It All Away" (featuring Andy Gibb) (B. Gibb, Blue Weaver) – 3:52
8. "Night Fever/More Than a Woman" – 3:26
9. "Lonely Days" – 3:44
10. "New York Mining Disaster 1941" (B. Gibb, R. Gibb) – 2:15
11. "I Can't See Nobody" (B. Gibb, R. Gibb) – 1:30
12. "And the Sun Will Shine" – 1:54
13. "Nights on Broadway" – 1:05
14. "How Can You Mend a Broken Heart" (B. Gibb, R. Gibb) – 3:27
15. "Heartbreaker" – 1:05
16. "Guilty" – 2:21
17. "Immortality" (featuring Celine Dion) – 4:46
18. "Tragedy" – 4:28
19. "I Started a Joke" – 2:48
20. "Grease" (featuring Frankie Valli) (B. Gibb) – 2:43
21. "Jive Talkin'" – 4:19
22. "How Deep Is Your Love" – 3:54
23. "Stayin' Alive" – 3:59
24. "You Should Be Dancing" – 4:12

=== 1999 reissue bonus CD ===
1. "I've Gotta Get a Message to You" – 4:08
2. "One" – 4:38
3. "Still Waters (Run Deep)" – 3:26
4. "Morning of My Life (In the Morning)" (B. Gibb) – 3:10
5. "Too Much Heaven" – 1:58
6. "Run to Me" – 1:19

=== DVD/Blu-ray ===
1. "You Should Be Dancing"
2. "Alone"
3. "Massachusetts"
4. "To Love Somebody"
5. "I've Gotta Get a Message to You"
6. "Words"
7. "Closer Than Close"
8. "Islands in the Stream"
9. "One"
10. "Our Love (Don't Throw It All Away)"
11. "Night Fever"
12. "More Than a Woman"
13. "Still Waters (Run Deep)"
14. "Lonely Days"
15. "Morning of My Life (In the Morning)"
16. "New York Mining Disaster 1941"
17. "Too Much Heaven"
18. "I Can't See Nobody"
19. "Run to Me"
20. "And the Sun Will Shine"
21. "Nights on Broadway"
22. "How Can You Mend a Broken Heart"
23. "Heartbreaker"
24. "Guilty"
25. "Immortality"
26. "Tragedy"
27. "I Started a Joke"
28. "Grease"
29. "Jive Talkin'"
30. "How Deep Is Your Love"
31. "Stayin' Alive"
32. "You Should Be Dancing"

Note: As the song "How Deep Is Your Love" finishes to sustained applause, Barry's daughter, Alexandra, appears on stage to present him and her uncle Robin with red roses. When she tries to give one to her other uncle, Maurice, "Stayin' Alive" starts to play, forcing her to exit.

While the song "Grease" is being performed, the lighting crew shines a spotlight on Olivia Newton-John and her daughter, Chloe Rose Lattanzi, who are sitting in the audience.

- DVD video is formatted for 4:3 screens.
- DVD audio tracks are in three formats:
  - Stereo Dolby Digital at 192 kbit/s
  - 5.1 Surround Dolby Digital at 448 kbit/s
  - 5.1 Surround DTS at 768 kbit/s
- Blu-ray video is formatted for 16:9 screens with upscaled SD video.

== Personnel ==
- Barry Gibb – vocals, acoustic rhythm guitar
- Robin Gibb – vocals
- Maurice Gibb – vocals, keyboards, acoustic rhythm guitar

Additional personnel

- Alan Kendall – lead guitar
- Stephen Gibb – rhythm guitar
- Ben Stivers – keyboards
- Matt Bonelli – bass guitar
- Steve Rucker – drums
- John Merchant – off-stage keyboards, mix engineer
- Celine Dion – vocals on "Immortality"
- Andy Gibb – pre-recorded vocals on "Our Love (Don't Throw It All Away)"
- Frankie Valli – pre-recorded vocals on "Grease"

== Charts ==
=== Weekly charts ===
| Chart (1998–2000) | Peak position |
|---|---|
| Australian Albums (ARIA) | 1 |
| Austrian Albums (Ö3 Austria) | 1 |
| Belgian Albums (Ultratop Flanders) | 36 |
| Belgian Albums (Ultratop Wallonia) | 14 |
| Dutch Albums (Album Top 100) | 1 |
| European Albums (Music & Media) | 3 |
| French Albums (SNEP) | 5 |
| German Albums (Offizielle Top 100) | 5 |
| New Zealand Albums (RMNZ) | 1 |
| Norwegian Albums (VG-lista) | 3 |
| Scottish Albums (OCC) | 8 |
| Swedish Albums (Sverigetopplistan) | 18 |
| Swiss Albums (Schweizer Hitparade) | 2 |
| Taiwanese International Albums (IFPI) | 3 |
| UK Albums (OCC) | 4 |
| US Billboard 200 | 72 |
| US Top Catalog Albums (Billboard) | 1 |

=== Year-end charts ===
| Chart (1998) | Position |
|---|---|
| Austrian Albums (Ö3 Austria) | 13 |
| Belgian Albums (Ultratop Wallonia) | 99 |
| German Albums (Offizielle Top 100) | 71 |
| New Zealand Albums (RMNZ) | 1 |
| Swiss Albums (Schweizer Hitparade) | 27 |
| UK Albums (OCC) | 17 |

| Chart (1999) | Position |
|---|---|
| Australian Albums (ARIA) | 2 |
| Dutch Albums (MegaCharts) | 12 |
| French Albums (SNEP) | 63 |
| New Zealand Albums (RIANZ) | 6 |
| UK Albums (OCC) | 61 |
| US Billboard 200 | 168 |

| Chart (2012) | Position |
|---|---|
| UK Albums (OCC) | 145 |

== Certifications and sales ==
| Region | Certification | Certified units/sales |
|---|---|---|
| Argentina (CAPIF) | Platinum | 60,000^{^} |
| Australia (ARIA) | 4× Platinum | 280,000^{^} |
| Australia (ARIA) video | 10× Platinum | 150,000^{^} |
| Austria (IFPI Austria) | Platinum | 50,000^{*} |
| Brazil (Pro-Música Brasil) | Gold | 100,000^{*} |
| Canada (Music Canada) | Platinum | 100,000^{^} |
| Canada (Music Canada) One Night Only & The Official Story | Platinum | 10,000^{^} |
| France (SNEP) | Gold | 100,000^{*} |
| Germany (BVMI) | Gold | 250,000^{^} |
| Germany (BVMI) video | Gold | 25,000^{^} |
| Netherlands (NVPI) | Gold | 50,000^{^} |
| New Zealand (RMNZ) | 8× Platinum | 120,000^{^} |
| New Zealand (RMNZ) video | 6× Platinum | 30,000^{^} |
| Norway (IFPI Norway) | Platinum | 50,000^{*} |
| Sweden (GLF) | Gold | 40,000^{^} |
| Switzerland (IFPI Switzerland) | Platinum | 50,000^{^} |
| United Kingdom (BPI) | 3× Platinum | 900,000^{^} |
| United Kingdom (BPI) video | 2× Platinum | 100,000^{^} |
| United States (RIAA) | Platinum | 1,000,000^{^} |
| United States (RIAA) video | 5× Platinum | 500,000^{^} |
Summaries
| Europe (IFPI) | 2× Platinum | 2,000,000^{*} |
| Worldwide | — | 6,000,000 |
^{*} Sales figures based on certification alone.^{^} Shipments figures based on certification alone.

== Release history ==
| Region | Date | Label | Format | Catalog |
|---|---|---|---|---|
| Europe | 7 September 1998 | Polydor Records | CD | 559,220-2 |
| United States | 3 November 1998 | A&M Records | CD | 559,220-2 |
| United States | 24 November 1998 | Image Entertainment | DVD | 5474 |
| United States | 29 July 2013 | Eagle Vision | Blu-ray | B00D6QUJ6U |
