= Music for UNICEF Concert =

1979 benefit concert

The event was broadcast on NBC in the United States

The Music for UNICEF Concert: A Gift of Song was a benefit concert of popular music held in the United Nations General Assembly in New York City on January 9, 1979. It was intended to raise money for UNICEF world hunger programs and to mark the beginning of the International Year of the Child. The concert was videotaped and broadcast the following day on NBC in the U.S. and around the world. The moderator was David Frost, with Gilda Radner and Henry Winkler also introducing some of the performers. Henry Fonda made a short appearance. Each performer signed a large parchment declaring support for UNICEF's goals.

The concert was the idea of impresario Robert Stigwood, the Bee Gees, and David Frost, who originally conceived it as an annual event. Not all of the performances were truly live, with ABBA lip-synching their new song "Chiquitita" and the Bee Gees lip-synching their song "Too Much Heaven". It raised less than one million dollars at the time for UNICEF, although this figure did not include longer-term royalties from the songs and repeat performances.

== Performers ==
The Music for UNICEF Concert featured some of the biggest names in pop music at the time, and the performers donated their performance royalties and those from one song each to UNICEF. (The Bee Gees' song "Too Much Heaven", for example, had earned more than seven million dollars for UNICEF as of 2003). However, some artists released the royalties for only a limited time. Most of the songs performed were not specifically about the issue of child poverty.

Elton John was scheduled to perform but did not appear.

A recording of the concert was released on an LP on Polydor Records several weeks later, with the performances in a different running order.

- ABBA — "Chiquitita"
- Bee Gees — "Too Much Heaven"
- Andy Gibb— "I Go For You"
- Andy Gibb and Olivia Newton-John — "Rest Your Love on Me"
- Olivia Newton-John — "The Key"
- John Denver — "Rhymes & Reasons"
- Earth, Wind & Fire — "September"
- Rita Coolidge and Kris Kristofferson — "Fallen Angels"
- Rod Stewart — "Da Ya Think I'm Sexy?"
- Donna Summer — "Mimi's Song"

There were also opening and closing songs, performed by all participants:

- Opening medley, ending with part of ABBA's "He Is Your Brother"
- Closing song: Jackie DeShannon's "Put a Little Love in Your Heart"

All songs featured a sixty-six-piece orchestra, conducted by Israel's Nurit Hirsh, who made her first American appearance.

== See also ==
- The Concert for Bangladesh
