= Irresistible Force (song) =

Song by Bee Gees

from the album Still Waters
- Released: March 1997
- Recorded: March 1996; The Hit Factory, New York City
- Genre: Pop rock
- Length: 4:36
- Label: Polydor Records (UK); A&M Records (US)
- Songwriter(s): Barry Gibb, Robin Gibb, Maurice Gibb
- Producer(s): Hugh Padgham

"Irresistible Force" is a song by the Bee Gees, released in March 1997 on their album Still Waters. The song was written by Barry Gibb, Robin Gibb and Maurice Gibb.

== Recording ==
It was written in 1995, and was recorded in 1996 as a demo and then this song was recorded with "Miracles Happen." This track was one of the highlights in that album with its guitar and synth rock sound. The keyboards were played by Maurice and Robbie Kondor (Robbie also played on other songs in their 1987 album E.S.P..), the guitars were played by Waddie Watchtel and Carlos Alomar (who also worked with David Bowie, Mick Jagger, John Lennon and others), The bass was played by Pino Palladino (A Welsh session player who worked with Simon & Garfunkel, The Who, Eric Clapton, Joe Walsh, Jeff Beck, Paul Young and others). The drums were played by Steve Jordan.

== Personnel ==
- Robin Gibb - lead vocals
- Barry Gibb - lead and backing vocals, programming
- Maurice Gibb - backing vocals, keyboard
- Robbie Kondor - keyboard
- Waddy Watchtel - guitar
- Carlos Alomar - guitar
- Pino Palladino - bass
- Steve Jordan - drums
- John Merchant - sound engineer
- Hugh Padgham - sound engineer, producer
- Glen Marchese - sound engineer
