= Warm Ride =

1980 song by Andy Gibb

Song by Bee Gees

from the album Bee Gees Greatest
- Released: September 2007
- Recorded: February – April 1977
- Genre: Disco
- Length: 3:16
- Label: Rhino, Reprise
- Songwriter(s): Barry, Robin & Maurice Gibb
- Producer(s): Bee Gees, Albhy Galuten, Karl Richardson

"Warm Ride"

Song by Andy Gibb

from the album After Dark
- Released: February 1980
- Recorded: November 1979
- Studio: Criteria Studios, Miami
- Genre: Pop
- Length: 3:30
- Label: RSO
- Songwriter(s): Barry, Robin & Maurice Gibb
- Producer(s): Gibb-Galuten-Richardson

"Warm Ride" is a song written by Barry, Robin and Maurice Gibb, and recorded by the Bee Gees and during the 1977 Saturday Night Fever sessions in France. The Bee Gees original, if unfinished, recording remained unreleased until 2007 when it was mixed and included on a reissue of Bee Gees Greatest. The song was an outtake from the soundtrack.

== Personnel ==
- Barry Gibb – lead vocals, guitar
- Robin Gibb – vocals
- Maurice Gibb – vocals, bass
- Blue Weaver – keyboards, synthesiser, piano
- Dennis Bryon – drums
- Joe Lala – percussion

== Cover versions ==
- The song was recorded by Rare Earth, for whom it was originally written by the Bee Gees. The song reached number 39 on the US Hot 100, and number 68 on the Australian charts.
- Graham Bonnet's version was released as a single and reached number 2 in Australia in August 1978.
- Andy Gibb's version of the song was recorded in 1979 and released in 1980 on his last studio album, After Dark. It was the last song recorded for the album with backing vocals done by older brother Barry Gibb.
