= I Could Not Love You More =

Single by Bee Gees

from the album Still Waters
- B-side: "Love Never Dies"
- Released: 9 June 1997
- Recorded: March 1996; Los Angeles, California, United States
- Genre: R&B
- Length: 3:43
- Label: Polydor
- Songwriter(s): Barry, Robin & Maurice Gibb
- Producer(s): Barry Gibb, Robin Gibb, Maurice Gibb, David Foster

Bee Gees singles chronology
"Alone" (1997)	"I Could Not Love You More" (1997)	"Still Waters (Run Deep)" (1997)

Music video
- "I Could Not Love You More" on YouTube

"I Could Not Love You More" is a song by the Bee Gees from their twenty-first studio album, Still Waters, released in 1997 as the album's second single. The song is a pop ballad written by Barry, Robin and Maurice Gibb and recorded in Los Angeles in March 1996. The track was produced by the Gibb brothers and David Foster. The track was a moderate hit worldwide, peaking at #14 in the UK and appearing in serious charts all over Europe.

== Critical reception ==
British magazine Music Week rated the song three out of five, writing, "The Gibb brothers tremble through a gentle ballad. It's sweet, but unlikely to match the success of Alone."

== Music video ==
The song's accompanying music video for "I Could Not Love You More" shows the band singing in a black background and on a street, intercut with scenes of a relationship between a man and a woman. It also features two young kids, a boy and a girl, on a pier.

== Track listings ==
- UK CD single 1
1. "I Could Not Love You More" - 3:43
2. "Love Never Dies" - 4:05 (An exclusive brand new song for the single)
3. BRIT Awards Medley - 7:26 (Recorded on 24 February 1997 at the BRIT Awards Ceremony in London, including the songs "To Love Somebody", "Massachusetts", "Words", "How Deep Is Your Love", "Jive Talkin'", "Stayin' Alive", and "You Should Be Dancing")
- UK CD single 2
1. "I Could Not Love You More" - 3:43
2. "Jive Talkin'" - 2:50 (Recorded on 25 November 1996 at Coral Gables, in a special performance for the VH1 Storytellers Specials)
3. "To Love Somebody" - 3:09 (Also from VH1 Storytellers)
4. "Stayin' Alive" (1996) - 4:06 (A re-recording of "Stayin' Alive")

== Charts ==
Chart (1997)	Peak position
Germany (GfK)	88
UK Singles (OCC)	14

== Cover versions ==
- The Brazilian group KLB recorded a version in Portuguese entitled "Te Amar Ainda Mais", recorded the album "KLB 2001" and released as a second single, reaching # 2 in Brazil.
