= Still Waters (Run Deep) =

1997 single by Bee Gees

Single by Bee Gees

from the album Still Waters
- B-side: "Love Never Dies"
- Released: 27 October 1997
- Length: 4:08
- Label: Polydor
- Songwriters: Barry, Robin, and Maurice Gibb
- Producer: Hugh Padgham

Bee Gees singles chronology
"I Could Not Love You More" (1997)	"Still Waters (Run Deep)" (1997)	"Immortality" (1998)

"Still Waters (Run Deep)" is a song by the Bee Gees, written by Barry, Robin, and Maurice Gibb. It was the third and final single issued from their 21st studio album, Still Waters (1997), on 27 October 1997. The recording and production of the song were assisted by Hugh Padgham. The song became the album's third top-20 UK single, peaking at No. 18 on the UK Singles Chart. It also reached No. 57 on the US Billboard Hot 100, their most recent appearance on that chart.

== Critical reception ==
British magazine Music Week rated "Still Waters (Run Deep)" three out of five, adding, "The title track from the Gibb brothers' latest album is their usual pleasant, sumptuously-performed fare, but it doesn't have the strength to become a huge hit."

== Music video ==
A music video was produced to promote the single, directed by Jake Nava. In the video, the Bee Gees are standing under and walking around road bridges in the city at night while two lovers, a woman and a man, find their way to love each other. The video ends with sunrise.

== Versions ==
The single version was remixed with a more R&B/hip hop beat compared with the album version. A demo version was included on one of the UK CD singles.

== Live performances ==
On 14 November 1997, the Bee Gees performed the song in Las Vegas for their One Night Only concert to promote the single.

== Track listings ==
- UK CD single 1
1. "Still Waters (Run Deep)" – 4:08
2. "Still Waters (Run Deep)" (demo) – 3:55
3. "Obsessions" – 4:43
- UK CD single 2
1. "Still Waters (Run Deep)" – 4:08
2. "Night Fever" – 3:29
3. "More Than a Woman" – 3:16
4. "You Should Be Dancing" – 4:16
- US CD single
1. "Still Waters (Run Deep)" – 4:08
2. "Love Never Dies" – 4:05

== Charts ==
Chart (1997)	Peak position
Canada Adult Contemporary (RPM)	19
Estonia Airplay (Eesti Top 25)	8
Europe (European Hot 100 Singles)	86
Germany (GfK)	79
Netherlands (Single Top 100)	91
Scottish Singles Sales (Official Charts)	18
UK Singles (Official Charts)	18
US Billboard Hot 100	57
US Adult Contemporary (Billboard)	29

== Release history ==
Region	Date	Format(s)	Label(s)	Ref.
United States	21 October 1997	Contemporary hit radio	Polydor	
United Kingdom	27 October 1997	CD; cassette	Polydor	
