= Rest Your Love on Me =

1980 song by Andy Gibb and Olivia Newton-John

- German release picture sleeve

Single by Bee Gees
- A-side: "Too Much Heaven"
- Released: November 1978
- Recorded: 2 May 1976
- Studio: Le Studio, Quebec, Canada
- Genre: Country pop
- Length: 4:20
- Label: RSO
- Songwriter: Barry Gibb
- Producers: Bee Gees, Albhy Galuten, Karl Richardson

Bee Gees flipsides singles chronology
"Down the Road (live)" (1978)	"Rest Your Love on Me" (1978)	"Until" (1979)

"Rest Your Love on Me" is a country ballad performed by the Bee Gees and written and sung by Barry Gibb. It was the B-side of the US No. 1 hit "Too Much Heaven". Andy Gibb recorded the song as a duet with Olivia Newton-John for his 1980 album After Dark.

== Recording ==
"Rest Your Love on Me" was written by Barry Gibb in 1976 and recorded it on 2 May on the Children of the World sessions. Stephen Stills played bass on its original demo.

It was not used until "Too Much Heaven" was released, as "Rest Your Love on Me" was chosen as the B-side. As a country song, it did not fit in with what the Bee Gees were putting on their albums, even though they continued to write the occasional country song, like "Where Do I Go", also left off the forthcoming album.

== Release ==
The song reached No. 39 on the country charts in the United States, their only appearance in the Country Top 40 as artists (though Barry and Maurice also performed and played on 1983's country chart-topping "Islands in the Stream"). The single was a double-A side in the United Kingdom, France, Scandinavia, Ireland and Belgium. Later in 1979, it was included on the compilation album Bee Gees Greatest, which reached No. 1 on the Billboard album charts.

The Osmonds, themselves beginning a transition from pop/rock to country music, recorded the song shortly before the Bee Gees released their version, but it was not released until afterwards. In January 1979, Andy Gibb and Olivia Newton-John performed it at the Music for UNICEF Concert.

== Credits and personnel ==
- Barry Gibb – vocals, guitar
- Stephen Stills – bass
- Blue Weaver – keyboards, synthesiser, piano
- Dennis Bryon – drums
- Karl Richardson – sound engineer
- Nick Blacona – engineer

== Conway Twitty version ==
"Rest Your Love on Me"

Single by Conway Twitty

from the album Rest Your Love on Me
- B-side: "I Am the Dreamer (You Are the Dream)"
- Released: 21 February 1981
- Genre: Country
- Length: 4:22
- Label: MCA
- Songwriter: Barry Gibb
- Producers: Conway Twitty, Ron Chancey

Conway Twitty singles chronology
"Lovin' What Your Lovin' Does to Me" (1981)	"Rest Your Love on Me" (1981)	"I Still Believe in Waltzes" (1981)

"Rest Your Love on Me" was recorded by Conway Twitty in 1980 for his album of the same name. It was his 25th number one on the country chart as a solo artist. The single went to number one for one week and spent a total of ten weeks within the top 40.

=== Charts ===
Chart (1981)	Peak position
U.S. Billboard Hot Country Singles & Tracks	1
Canadian RPM Country Tracks	9

== Other versions ==
- Andy Gibb and Olivia Newton-John had performed a duet version of "Rest Your Love on Me" at the UNICEF show in January 1979, so she agreed to record it as a new song for Andy's third album After Dark. The song was released as a single in countries across Europe and South America, as well as in Japan and South Africa.
- The Osmonds recorded the song for their 1979 album Steppin' Out, produced by Steve Klein and Maurice Gibb.
- Rhythm Sound, a Surinamese group, recorded "Rest Your Love on Me" in their own language.
- Czech singers duo Jiří Korn and Helena Vondráčková recorded their "Rest Your Love on Me" cover in the Czech version called "Každá trampota má svou mez" ("Every tramp has its limit") in 1980.
