= This Is Where I Came In (song) =

2001 single by Bee Gees

Single by Bee Gees

from the album This Is Where I Came In
- B-side: "Just in Case"; "I Will Be There"
- Released: 5 March 2001
- Recorded: 2000
- Length: 4:56; 7:26 (extended version)
- Label: Polydor
- Songwriters: Barry Gibb; Robin Gibb; Maurice Gibb
- Producer: Bee Gees

Bee Gees singles chronology
"Immortality" (1998)	"This Is Where I Came In" (2001)	"Ups & Downs" (2005)

"This Is Where I Came In" is the final single by the Bee Gees, released on 5 March 2001 as the only single from their final studio album, This Is Where I Came In. The song was written by Barry, Robin and Maurice Gibb. Lead vocals were performed by Robin Gibb on the first verse and on the chorus, while Barry Gibb sang lead on the second verse and sings harmony on the chorus.

The song reached No. 18 on the UK Singles Chart, becoming their final top-40 hit in the United Kingdom. With this track, the Bee Gees became the first group to obtain UK top-20 hits across five decades, which began in 1967 with "New York Mining Disaster 1941". It also reached No. 25 in Germany and No. 23 on the US Billboard Adult Contemporary chart. The song's music video was described as "very stylish and beautiful."

== Track listings ==
All tracks are written by Barry, Robin, and Maurice Gibb.

UK and Australian CD single
No.	Title	Length
1.	"This Is Where I Came In" (single version)	3:58
2.	"Just in Case"	4:22
3.	"I Will Be There"	4:04
4.	"This Is Where I Came In" (CD-ROM video)	3:58

UK cassette single
No.	Title	Length
1.	"This Is Where I Came In" (single version)	3:58
2.	"Just in Case"	4:22

== Personnel ==
The Bee Gees

- Barry Gibb – lead, harmony and backing vocals
- Robin Gibb – lead, harmony and backing vocals
- Maurice Gibb – harmony and backing vocals, acoustic guitar

Additional personnel

- Alan Kendall – electric guitar
- George "Chocolate" Perry – bass guitar
- Steve Rucker – drums

== Charts ==
Chart (2001)	Peak position
Australia (ARIA)	76
Austria (Ö3 Austria Top 40)	42
Belgium (Ultratip Bubbling Under Flanders)	7
Belgium (Ultratip Bubbling Under Wallonia)	10
Europe (Eurochart Hot 100)	43
France (IFOP)	88
Germany (GfK)	25
Netherlands (Dutch Top 40 Tipparade)	16
Netherlands (Single Top 100)	56
New Zealand (Recorded Music NZ)	37
Scotland Singles (OCC)	24
Switzerland (Schweizer Hitparade)	41
UK Singles (OCC)	18
US Adult Contemporary (Billboard)	23

== Release history ==
Region	Date	Format(s)	Label(s)	Ref.
Australia	5 March 2001	CD	Polydor	
United States	12 March 2001	Hot adult contemporary radio	Universal	
United States	13 March 2001	Rhythmic contemporary; contemporary hit radio	Universal	
United Kingdom	26 March 2001	CD; cassette	Polydor	
