= Spirits (Having Flown) =

Single by Bee Gees

from the album Spirits Having Flown and Greatest
- B-side: "Wind of Change"
- Released: December 1979
- Recorded: 1978
- Studio: Criteria (Miami)
- Genre: Pop, R&B
- Length: 5:21; 5:10 (7" version)
- Label: RSO
- Songwriters: Barry, Robin & Maurice Gibb
- Producers: Bee Gees, Albhy Galuten, Karl Richardson

Bee Gees singles chronology
"Love You Inside Out" (1979)	"Spirits (Having Flown)" (1979)	"He's a Liar" (1981)

"Spirits (Having Flown)" is a song by the Bee Gees which was originally released on the 1979 album Spirits Having Flown. Though not issued as a single in conjunction with the parent album, it was released in the UK in December to promote the compilation album Greatest, which had been released in late October 1979. Its B-side was a 1975 song "Wind of Change" from the group's Main Course album.

The song itself is a Caribbean flavored R&B track sung by Barry Gibb in natural voice during the verses and joined by Robin and Maurice Gibb on the chorus which is sung in falsetto. The count-in (1, 2, 3, 4) heard on the album version was omitted from the single version and on the album Bee Gees Greatest. Flute work for the track was provided by Herbie Mann. A promotional video of the song, presenting the Bee Gees and Andy Gibb on holiday at Miami Beach, was released.

The single peaked at No. 16 in the UK in January 1980, and would be the last Top 40 hit the band had in the UK until 1987.

== Personnel ==
- Barry Gibb – lead and harmony vocals, acoustic guitar
- Maurice Gibb – bass guitar, backing vocals
- Robin Gibb – backing vocals
- Herbie Mann – flute
- Alan Kendall – electric guitar
- Blue Weaver – keyboards, synthesizer
- Joe Lala – percussion
- Daniel Ben Zebulon – percussion

== Chart performance ==
Chart (1980)	Peak position
Ireland (IRMA)	14
Netherlands (Dutch Top 40)	36
UK Singles (Official Charts Company)	16
