= Steve Rucker =

American drummer

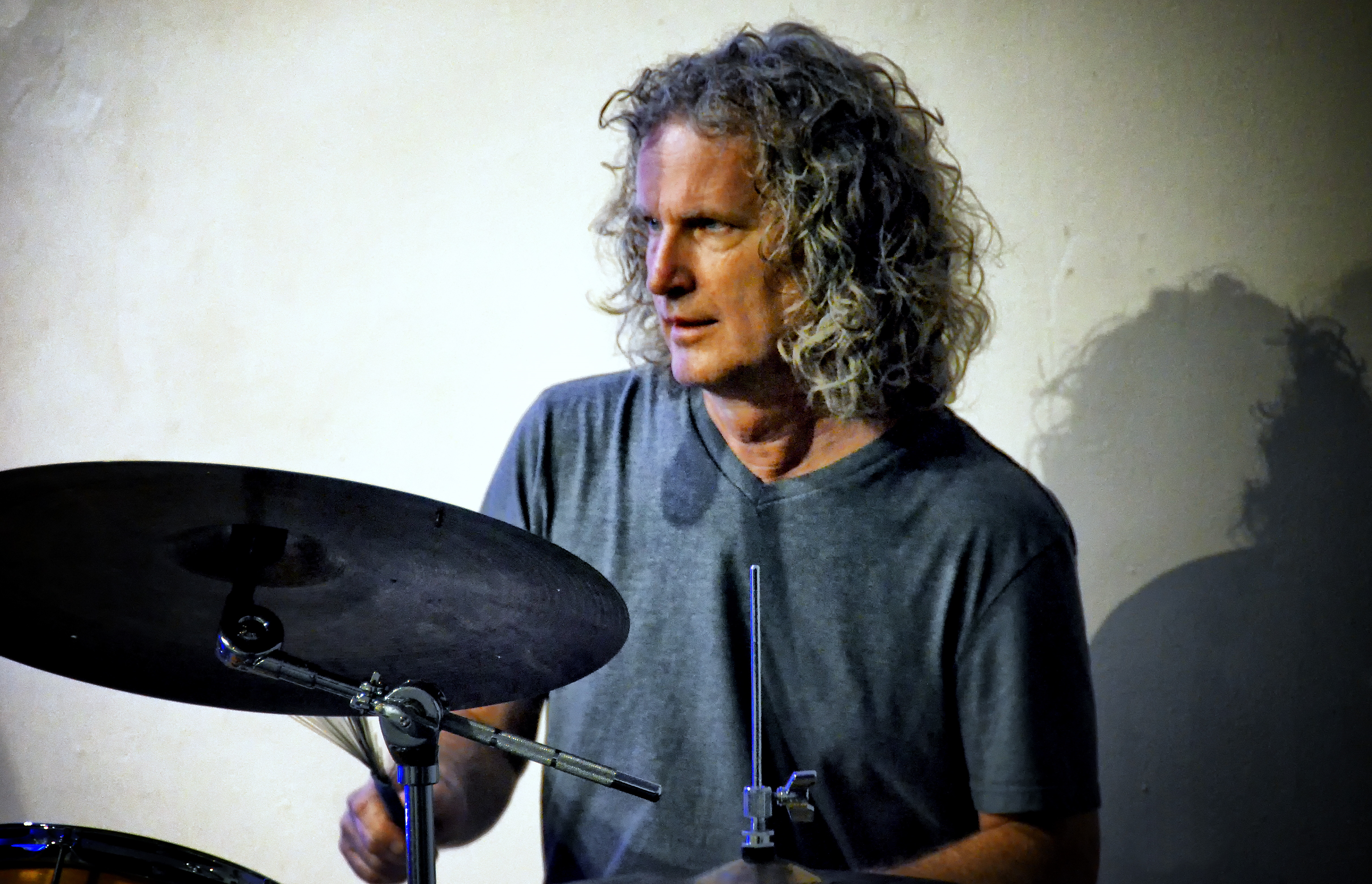
- Steve Rucker in 2015

Stephen Rucker (born 2 March 1954) is an American musician and drummer who served as a drummer with many artists. His biggest and well known act was the Bee Gees. With the Bee Gees band, he appeared on The Tonight Show, Late Night with David Letterman, Oprah Winfrey, The Rosie O'Donnell Show, the Rock and Roll Hall of Fame induction and a Royal Variety Performance. Rucker appears on the Bee Gees' One Night Only recording and DVD. He is currently the Drumset Studies director of the University of Miami's Frost School of Music.

== Early life ==
Originally from Charlotte, North Carolina, Rucker attended Berklee College of Music in Boston, and holds an Undergraduate Degree in Studio Music and Jazz and a master's degree in Jazz Performance from the University of Miami Frost School of Music.

From September 1974 until May 1975, Rucker toured with the Charlotte-based band Sugarcreek. During this period he became the musical arranger for the seven-piece horn band, and wrote and recorded their first single, "Runnin' Out of Time".

In 2003, he married Claudia Rucker

== Florida ==
Rucker moved to Miami, Florida in 1976. Soon after, he was voted "Best Jazz Performer" and "Most Versatile Artist" in South Florida polls. In the early 1980s, Rucker was a member of the Ross-Levine band, a jazz fusion group. In addition to numerous appearances with them, he recorded "That Summer Something" and "Humidity".

== Ocean Sound Band ==
While a member of Randy Bernsen's Ocean Sound Band in the late 1980s and early 1990s, he recorded tracks on "Paradise Citizens" and "Calling Me Back Home", and performed in many concerts internationally, including a billing with Miles Davis. In 1992, he recorded "Blues Hat Dances 'Round Midnight" with Randy Bernsen and Onorino Tiburzi in Italy.

In 1990, he recorded "Hold Me, Thrill Me, Kiss Me" with Gloria Estefan. For many years, he performed nationwide with Ben Vereen, and appeared with Vereen with the Atlanta Symphony and the Dallas Symphony.

== Active Ingredient ==
Rucker founded and produced the jazz ensemble Active Ingredient, a group of musicians from the University of Miami. The band debuted on Bainbridge Records in 1988 with "Building Houses," followed by "Extra Strength" in 1990.

== Bee Gees ==
In 1997, Rucker appeared on a Bee Gees concert at the MGM Grand Las Vegas which was shown on pay-per-view television, HBO, and was released as a live album selling over 5 million copies. This led to a world tour of "One Night Only" concerts. The tour included playing to 56,000 people at London's Wembley Stadium on 5 September 1998 and concluded in the newly built Olympic Stadium in Sydney, Australia in March 1999.

Rucker also performed or recorded with Michael Jackson, Paquito D'Rivera, Barry Gibb, Jaco Pastorius, Cliff Richard, Joe Sample, Johnny Cash, Ben Vereen, Bo Diddley, Freda Payne, the Woody Herman Big Band, the Tommy Dorsey Big Band (with Warren Covington), Sam Moore and Bob James.

== University of Miami ==
Since 1979, Rucker has been the Director of Drumset Studies at the University of Miami. He directs the Funk/Fusion Ensemble, which has won over twenty DownBeat Student Awards. In previous years has created ensembles performing the music of Tower of Power and Weather Report. RUCKER also directs the RUCK Ensemble, an original hip hop/funk group.

== Late career ==
In 2008, Rucker created an avant garde duo with guitarist Tom Lippincott.

In 2010, Rucker recorded an album with composer Ron Miller, entitled Peacock Park the Music of Ron Miller.

Rucker completed an album in 2013 entitled Conversions with singer/pianist Hal Roland, in a live jazz quartet configuration.

In 2015, in collaboration with former student Jonathan Joseph, Rucker wrote and published Exercises in African-American Funk, which contains a set of exercises for developing a fusion of African and American funk drumming elements.

In 2021, Rucker recorded "A Tribute to Ron Miller," by the group The Regions, consisting of fellow University of Miami musicians Jon Gilutin, Jeff Carswell, Steve Watson, Gary Keller, David Fernandez, Wendy Pedersen, John Lovell, John Daversa, Murph Aucamp, and Brian Potts. The record featured reimagined compositions by the legendary composer Ron Miller.

On April 8, 2025, Rucker received a Centennial Medal at the University of Miami Frost Centennial Celebration, which commemorated the 100th year of the music school, now the Frost School of Music. He performed with fellow alums Pat Metheny and Will Lee at the Centennial Concert that evening.
