= This Is Where I Came In =

Studio album by the Bee Gees
- Released: 2 April 2001
- Recorded: 1998–2000
- Studio: Middle Ear (Miami Beach); Area 21 (London)
- Genre: Soft rock; alternative rock
- Length: 52:24
- Label: Polydor; Universal
- Producer: Bee Gees; Peter-John Vettese

The Bee Gees chronology
| One Night Only (1998) | This Is Where I Came In (2001) | Their Greatest Hits: The Record (2001) |

Singles from This Is Where I Came In
- 1. "This Is Where I Came In" Released: 5 March 2001

This Is Where I Came In is the twenty-second and final studio album by the Bee Gees. It was released on 2 April 2001 by Polydor in the UK and Universal in the US, less than two years before Maurice Gibb died from a cardiac arrest after surgery to repair a twisted intestine.

Professional ratings
Review scores
| Source | Rating |
|---|---|
| AllMusic | 2/5 stars |
| Entertainment Weekly | C |
| Jam! | unfavorable |
| Rolling Stone | 3/5 stars |
| The Rolling Stone Album Guide | 3.5/5 stars |
| Muzykalnaya Gazeta | favorable |

It is the only album of all-new material released by them on the Universal Music label (which had acquired the rights to the group's releases on Polydor Records when they bought that label's parent PolyGram). The album peaked at No. 6 in the UK, while the single, "This Is Where I Came In", reached No. 18. In the US, the album peaked at No. 16. The group appeared on the A&E concert series Live by Request in April 2001 to promote the new album.

The brothers saw the album as a return to the original Bee Gees formula as well as a new beginning. The album marked the fifth decade of recording for the band. It was one of the first Bee Gees albums to be re-released on Reprise Records in 2006, when the brothers regained the rights to all of their recordings.

== Background ==
The album features main vocals from all three of the brothers, and employs a variety of musical styles. "This Is Where I Came In" recalls the rock theme more commonly found on 1960s Bee Gees songs. "She Keeps on Coming" and "Voice in the Wilderness" have strong rock themes, while "Sacred Trust", "Just in Case" and "Wedding Day" continue the Bee Gees' trend for love songs. Maurice plays the Epiphone guitar given to him by John Lennon on "She Keeps On Coming" Two of Robin's songs, "Embrace" and "Promise The Earth" are Europop dance songs, while Barry's "Technicolor Dreams" is an exception to the rule, as it is an homage to the typical 1930s Tin Pan Alley melody. Maurice Gibb provides lead vocals for two songs, "Man in the Middle" and "Walking on Air". In the United Kingdom, two bonus tracks were published, "Just in Case" and "Promise the Earth" as well as other countries issued the album with 14 tracks.

The song "Wedding Day" was featured in an episode of the same name of the NBC drama Providence.

=== Recording ===
One song in the album, "Sacred Trust" was recorded in early 1998 in Miami Beach. Around 1999, the Bee Gees recorded "I Will Be There" but only as a demo as they sent it to Tina Turner and she recorded it for her album Twenty Four Seven that same year. Maurice Gibb was busy producing songs for the band Luna Park. Also in 1999, three new Barry Gibb compositions "Technicolor Dreams", "Loose Talk Costs Lives" and "Voice in the Wilderness" were recorded as well as four new Maurice Gibb compositions, but only "Walking on Air" and "Man in the Middle" were released. Also in 1999, the new Robin Gibb composition, "Embrace" was recorded. In October that year, the group recorded "Wedding Day". The next year 2000, the group recorded five more songs including the title track, "This Is Where I Came In".

== Track listing ==
All songs written by Barry, Robin and Maurice Gibb, except where noted.

| No. | Title | Lead vocal(s) | Length |
|---|---|---|---|
| 1. | "This Is Where I Came In" | Robin and Barry | 4:55 |
| 2. | "She Keeps on Coming" | Robin | 3:57 |
| 3. | "Sacred Trust" | Barry | 4:53 |
| 4. | "Wedding Day" | Barry and Robin | 4:44 |
| 5. | "Man in the Middle" (Maurice Gibb, Barry Gibb) | Maurice | 4:21 |
| 6. | "Déjà vu" | Robin | 4:17 |
| 7. | "Technicolor Dreams" (Barry Gibb) | Barry | 3:05 |
| 8. | "Walking on Air" (Maurice Gibb) | Maurice | 4:05 |
| 9. | "Loose Talk Costs Lives" (Barry Gibb) | Barry | 4:19 |
| 10. | "Embrace" (Robin Gibb) | Robin | 4:43 |
| 11. | "The Extra Mile" | Barry and Robin | 4:20 |
| 12. | "Voice in the Wilderness" (Barry Gibb, Ben Stivers, Alan Kendall, Steve Rucker, Matt Bonelli) | Barry | 4:37 |

UK/Japan/Australia bonus tracks
| No. | Title | Lead vocal(s) | Length |
|---|---|---|---|
| 13. | "Just in Case" | Barry and Robin | 4:22 |
| 14. | "Promise the Earth" | Robin | 4:29 |

== Personnel ==
Bee Gees

- Barry Gibb – lead vocals (1, 3, 4, 7, 9, 11, 12); harmony vocals (1–4, 8, 11); backing vocals (1–5, 7, 9, 11, 12); acoustic guitar (3, 4, 9); drum programming (3, 11)
- Robin Gibb – lead vocals (1, 2, 4, 6, 10, 11); harmony vocals (1–4, 6, 8, 11); backing vocals (1–4, 6, 10, 11)
- Maurice Gibb – lead vocals (5, 8); harmony vocals (1–4); backing vocals (1–5, 8); acoustic guitar (1, 3–5); electric guitar (2, 3, 5, 8, 9); keyboards (3–5, 8); bass programming (5, 8); drum programming (5, 8)

Additional musicians

- Alan Kendall – electric guitar (1, 2, 4, 7, 9, 11–13)
- Robbie McIntosh – electric guitar (6)
- Ben Stivers – piano (7); organ (12); keyboards (4, 7, 9); programming (4, 9, 12)
- Mark Evans – keyboards (10, 14); programming (6, 10, 14)
- Peter-John Vettese – keyboards (10, 14); programming (6, 10, 14); backing vocals (14)
- Roger Lyons – keyboards (10, 14); programming (10, 14)
- George "Chocolate" Perry – bass guitar (1–3, 9, 11, 13)
- Matt Bonelli – bass guitar (4, 7, 12); additional bass guitar (9)
- Steve Rucker – drums (1, 2, 4, 7, 9, 11–13)
- John Merchant – drum programming (3, 5, 8, 11)
- Neil Bonsanti – clarinet (7)

Orchestra on "The Extra Mile"

- Peter Graves – arrangements
- Larry Warrilow – orchestrations
- Alfredo Olivia – concertmaster

Horns

- Joe Barati, Jon Hutchinson and John Knicker – trombone
- Jason Carder and Ken Faulk – trumpet
- Jim Hacker – piccolo trumpet solo
- Dwayne Dixon, Eric Kerley and Cheryl Naberhaus – French horn

Strings

- David Cole and Chris Glansdorp – cello
- Tim Barnes and Chauncey Patterson – viola
- Hui Fang Chen, Gustavo Correa, Orlando Forte, Mel Mei Luo, Alfredo Olivia and Mariusz Wojtowics – violin

=== Production ===
- Bee Gees – executive producers
- Barry Gibb – producer (1–4, 7, 9, 11–13)
- Robin Gibb – producer (1–4, 6, 10, 11, 13, 14)
- Maurice Gibb – producer (1–5, 8, 11, 13)
- Peter-John Vettese – producer (6, 10, 14)
- John Merchant – recording (1–5, 7–9, 11–13), mixing (1–5, 7–9, 11–13), mastering assistant, technical production
- Mark Evans – engineer (6, 10, 14), mixing (6, 10, 14)
- Ashley Gibb – assistant engineer (1–4, 7, 9, 11–13)
- Geraldine Dubernet – assistant engineer (5, 7, 8)
- Bob Ludwig – mastering at Gateway Mastering (Portland, Maine)
- Dick Ashby – project coordinator
- Pat Gulino – project coordinator
- Cheryl Engels – quality control
- Unit – design
- Randee St. Nicholas – photography
- Alex Delves – stylist
- Left Bank Organization – management

== Charts ==
=== Weekly charts ===
| Chart (2001) | Peak position |
|---|---|
| Australian Albums (ARIA) | 16 |
| Austrian Albums (Ö3 Austria) | 6 |
| Belgian Albums (Ultratop Flanders) | 32 |
| Belgian Albums (Ultratop Wallonia) | 18 |
| Canadian Albums (Billboard) | 10 |
| Danish Albums (Hitlisten) | 14 |
| Dutch Albums (Album Top 100) | 15 |
| European Albums (Music & Media) | 4 |
| French Albums (SNEP) | 24 |
| German Albums (Offizielle Top 100) | 3 |
| Irish Albums (IRMA) | 57 |
| New Zealand Albums (RMNZ) | 4 |
| Swiss Albums (Schweizer Hitparade) | 5 |
| UK Albums (OCC) | 6 |
| US Billboard 200 | 16 |

=== Year-end charts ===
| Chart (2001) | Position |
|---|---|
| German Albums (Offizielle Top 100) | 58 |
| Swiss Albums (Schweizer Hitparade) | 72 |
| UK Albums (OCC) | 185 |

== Certifications ==
| Region | Certification | Certified units/sales |
|---|---|---|
| Australia (ARIA) | Gold | 35,000^{^} |
| Canada (Music Canada) | Gold | 50,000^{^} |
| Germany (BVMI) | Gold | 150,000^{^} |
| New Zealand (RMNZ) | Platinum | 15,000^{^} |
| Spain (Promusicae) | Gold | 50,000^{^} |
| Switzerland (IFPI Switzerland) | Gold | 20,000^{^} |
| United Kingdom (BPI) | Gold | 100,000^{^} |
^{^} Shipments figures based on certification alone.
