= Still Waters (Bee Gees album) =

Studio album by the Bee Gees
- Released: 10 March 1997
- Recorded: January–August 1996
- Studios: Middle Ear Studios, Miami Beach
- Genres: R&B; new jack swing; pop rock
- Length: 53:40
- Labels: Polydor; A&M
- Producers: Barry Gibb; Robin Gibb; Maurice Gibb; Russ Titelman; David Foster; Hugh Padgham; Raphael Saadiq; Arif Mardin

The Bee Gees chronology
Size Isn't Everything (1993)	Still Waters (1997)	One Night Only (1998)

Still Waters is the twenty-first and penultimate studio album by the Bee Gees, released on 10 March 1997 in the UK by Polydor Records, and on 6 May the same year in the US by A&M Records. The group made the album with a variety of top producers, including Russ Titelman, David Foster, Hugh Padgham, and Arif Mardin.

== Background ==
In 1994, the Bee Gees and Polydor Records had planned a major tour to promote Size Isn't Everything (1993) but it was postponed in February the same year due to Barry Gibb's trouble with arthritis in his back, right hand and right knee. Following the cancellation of the tour, Robin Gibb told the press that the group was working on an album of acoustic versions of songs they had written for other artists. The project was later called Love Songs, which featured some new recordings and was announced as the Bee Gees' new album in September 1994 and planned for release on 14 February (Valentine's Day) of 1995. However, their record company rejected the album.

Around 1994, the Bee Gees did record six songs, one of which was called "Miracles Happen" which was written and recorded to be the title song for a new film version of Miracle on 34th Street; the Bee Gees got the job in June 1994 and quickly returned this recording, with a boys’ choir and a big string section backing them. The filmmakers however decided later to use only old Christmas songs. On the same session, they also did their own version of their compositions such as "Emotion" (Samantha Sang), "Heartbreaker" (Dionne Warwick), "Love Never Dies" and "Rings Around the Moon", which were later released as B-sides.

== Recording ==
In July 1995, they started with seven demos for what would become included on the album, along with four demos recorded in the second quarter of 1995. During sessions in October 1995 they recorded their rendition of "Will You Love Me Tomorrow" for a Carole King tribute album Tapestry Revisited: A Tribute to Carole King.

In March 1996, they relocated to The Hit Factory in New York to record two songs. Around 1996, the Bee Gees used session musicians to complete the entire album, produced by Russ Titelman. Also in 1996, the Bee Gees recorded two songs with two members of P.M. Dawn, Attrel Cordes and Jarett Cordes. The producer on "With My Eyes Closed" was Raphael Saadiq. "Still Waters (Run Deep)" was produced by Hugh Padgham. The last song recorded for the album was "Closer than Close" which features Maurice Gibb's lead vocals produced by the brothers themselves.

== Release and critical reception ==
Professional ratings
Review scores
Source	Rating
AllMusic	2.5/5 stars
Chicago Tribune	2.5/4 stars
Entertainment Weekly	C
Los Angeles Times	2/4 stars
Rolling Stone	2/5 stars
The Rolling Stone Album Guide	2/5 stars

Though receiving lukewarm reviews from critics, the album was their most successful album in almost twenty years; it was released at a time when the Bee Gees were being awarded for lifetime achievements, had recently been inducted into the Rock and Roll Hall of Fame and were regaining high exposure on television, particularly VH1. The album peaked at No. 2 on the UK Albums Chart and No. 11 in the United States. The first single off the album, "Alone", was a worldwide hit, peaking at No. 5 in the UK and No. 28 in the United States, where it began as a "hot shot debut" at No. 34. "I Could Not Love You More" and "Still Waters (Run Deep)" also reached the UK top 20.

A reviewer for the newspaper Muzykalnaya Gazeta wrote: "There is life in the old dog yet! The water is still flowing in the river under the family name of Bee Gees! The brothers Barry, Maurice, and Robin Gibb did their best once again, for the umpteenth time, or rather to be even said, in their own style, as always."

In a special agreement with Target, Polydor also sold a special edition of the album which included a bonus CD of songs from their VH1 Storytellers concert. This CD has never been made commercially available outside of the Target agreement.

== Aftermath ==
In 2003 Robin Gibb re-recorded the track "My Lover's Prayer" as a duet with Alistair Griffin. This reached No. 5 on the UK Singles Chart as a double A-side single with Griffin's solo recording of "Bring It On". It also appears on Griffin's debut album Bring It On, which reached No. 12 on the UK Albums Chart.

The album became one of the first of the Bee Gees' catalogue to be re-released on Reprise Records after the group regained the rights to all of their recordings in 2006.

== Track listing ==
All songs written by Barry, Robin and Maurice Gibb.

Still Waters track listing
No.	Title	Lead vocal(s)	Length
1.	"Alone"	Barry and Robin	4:49
2.	"I Surrender"	Barry	4:18
3.	"I Could Not Love You More"	Barry	3:43
4.	"Still Waters Run Deep"	Barry and Robin	4:08
5.	"My Lover's Prayer"	Barry and Robin	4:00
6.	"With My Eyes Closed"	Barry	4:19
7.	"Irresistible Force"	Robin and Barry	4:36
8.	"Closer than Close"	Maurice and Barry	4:34
9.	"I Will"	Robin and Barry	5:08
10.	"Obsessions"	Barry	4:43
11.	"Miracles Happen"	Barry	4:12
12.	"Smoke and Mirrors"	Robin and Barry	5:00
Total length:			53:40

Bonus tracks
No.	Title	Lead vocal(s)	Length
13.	"Rings Around the Moon"	Robin and Barry	4:30
14.	"Love Never Dies"	Robin and Maurice	4:07

== Personnel ==
Bee Gees

- Barry Gibb – vocals, guitars (1, 4), drum programming (1, 7), additional drum programming (12), arrangements (12)
- Robin Gibb – vocals, arrangements (12)
- Maurice Gibb – vocals, keyboards (1, 2, 4, 7, 8, 11, 12), guitar (4), arrangements (12)

Additional personnel

- Alan Clark – keyboards (1)
- Robbie Kondor – keyboards (1, 5, 7, 11), drum programming (5), arrangements (5), synth horns (12)
- Jeff Bova – synth bass (1, 12), keyboards (12)
- Chuckii Booker – synthesizer programming (2)
- Doug Rasheed – synthesizer programming (2)
- Gen Rubin – synthesizer programming (2)
- David Foster – keyboards (3)
- Simon Franglen – Synclavier programming (3)
- Mike McAvoy – keyboards (4), guitars (4)
- Rob Mounsey – additional keyboards (5)
- Kelvin Wooten – keyboards (6)
- Peter-John Vettese – keyboards (8), programming (8)
- Steve Skinner – synthesizers (9, 10), arrangements (9, 10)
- Alan Kendall – guitars (2, 4, 8)
- Michael Thompson – guitars (2), electric guitars (3)
- Dean Parks – acoustic guitars (3)
- Marc Shulman – guitars (5, 12)
- Spanky Alford – guitars (6)
- Carl Verhyn – guitars (6)
- Raphael Saadiq – guitars (6), bass guitar (6), drum programming (6), additional vocals (6)
- Carlos Alomar – guitars (7, 11)
- Waddy Wachtel – guitars (7, 11)
- Pino Palladino – bass guitar (4, 7, 11)
- Anthony Jackson – bass guitar (5)
- George "Chocolate" Perry – bass guitar (12)
- Jimmy Bralower – ride cymbal (5), drum loops (12), additional drum programming (12)
- Manu Katché – drums (4)
- Steve Jordan – drums (7, 11)
- Joe Mardin – drum loops (9)
- David Halpern – additional toms (1)
- David Elliott – marching drum (1)
- Ralph MacDonald – tambourine (1)
- Steven Wolf – hi-hat (12)
- Russ Titelman – arrangements (5, 12), additional drum programming (12)
- Arif Mardin – string arrangements (5, 9, 10), arrangements (9, 10)
- Gene Orloff – concertmaster (5, 9, 10)
- Florida's Singing Sons Boys Choir – choir (11)
- Jeffri Bantz – choir director (11)

=== Production ===
- Bee Gees – executive producers, producers (1, 2, 8, 12)
- Russ Titelman – producer (1, 5, 12)
- David Foster – producer (2, 3)
- Hugh Padgham – producer (4, 7, 11)
- Raphael Saadiq – producer (6)
- Arif Mardin – producer (9, 10)
- Joanne Schwartz – production coordinator (1)
- Dawn Agent – production coordinator (6)
- Maureen Droney – production coordinator (6)
- Gloria Gabriel – production manager (9, 10)
- Stylorouge – design
- Anton Corbijn – photography
- Alex Delves – stylist
- Donna Karan – clothes
- Left Bank Management – management

Technical

- Bob Ludwig – mastering at Gateway Mastering (Portland, Maine)
- John Merchant – recording (1–8, 11, 12), vocal recording (9, 10), mastering assistant, technical production coordinator
- Dave O'Donnell – recording (1, 5, 12), mixing (1, 5, 12)
- Russ Titelman – mixing (1, 5, 12)
- Artie Smith – guitar and drum technician (1)
- Felipe Elgueta – recording (2, 3)
- Jon Gass – mixing (2)
- Humberto Gatica – recording (3)
- Mick Guzauski – mixing (3)
- Hugh Padgham – recording (4, 7, 11), mixing (4, 7, 11)
- Gerry Brown – recording (6), mixing (6)
- Darrin Harris – recording (6)
- Bill Malina – recording (6), digital editing (6)
- Raphael Saadiq – mixing (6)
- Michael O'Reilly – recording (9, 10)
- Jason Goldstein – assistant engineer (1, 9, 10)
- Jason Geek – recording assistant (4)
- Steve Eigner – assistant engineer (5, 12)
- Mike Viola – assistant engineer (5, 12)
- Doug Bohem – assistant engineer (6)
- Joe Zook – assistant engineer (6)
- Glen Marchese – recording assistant (7, 11)
- Richard Alderson – additional engineer (5)
- Joe Lizzi – mix assistant (1, 5, 12), assistant engineer (9, 10)
- Kyle Bess – mix assistant (2)
- Marnie Riley – mix assistant (3)
- Chris Carroll – mix assistant (4, 7, 11)

== Charts ==
=== Weekly charts ===
Weekly chart performance for Still Waters
Chart (1997)	Peak position
Australian ARIA Album Chart	4
Austrian Albums Chart	4
Belgian Albums Chart (Flanders)	7
Belgian Albums Chart (Wallonia)	9
Canadian RPM Albums Chart	11
Dutch Albums Chart	3
Finnish Albums Chart	23
European Albums Chart	4
French SNEP Albums Chart	5
German Media Control Albums Chart	2
Hungarian Albums (MAHASZ)	27
Irish Albums Chart	8
New Zealand Albums Chart	1
Norwegian VG-lista Albums Chart	16
Swedish Albums Chart	26
Swiss Albums Chart	1
UK Albums Chart	2
US Billboard 200	11

=== Year-end charts ===
Year-end chart performance for Still Waters
Chart (1997)	Position
Australian Albums Chart	21
Austrian Albums Chart	29
Belgian (Flanders) Albums Chart	97
Belgian (Wallonia) Albums Chart	53
Dutch Albums Chart	31
European Albums Chart	20
French Albums Chart	47
German Albums Chart	11
New Zealand Albums Chart	7
Swiss Albums Chart	10
UK Albums Chart	52
US Billboard 200	142

== Certifications ==
Certifications for Still Waters
Region	Certification	Certified units/sales
Australia (ARIA)	2× Platinum	140,000^{^}
Austria (IFPI Austria)	Gold	25,000^{*}
Canada (Music Canada)	Platinum	100,000^{^}
France (SNEP)	Gold	100,000^{*}
Germany (BVMI)	Platinum	500,000^{^}
Netherlands (NVPI)	Gold	50,000^{^}
New Zealand (RMNZ)	2× Platinum	30,000^{^}
Poland (ZPAV)	Gold	50,000^{*}
Switzerland (IFPI Switzerland)	Platinum	50,000^{^}
United Kingdom (BPI)	Gold	100,000^{^}
United States (RIAA)	2× Platinum	2,000,000^{^}
Summaries
Europe (IFPI)	Platinum	1,000,000^{*}
^{*} Sales figures based on certification alone.^{^} Shipments figures based on certification alone.
