= Spirits Having Flown =

Studio album by the Bee Gees
- Released: 5 February 1979
- Recorded: March–November 1978
- Studios: Criteria Studios, Miami
- Genres: Disco; soul; pop
- Length: 44:47
- Labels: RSO; Reprise (remastered)
- Producers: Bee Gees; Albhy Galuten; Karl Richardson

The Bee Gees chronology
Saturday Night Fever (1977)	Spirits Having Flown (1979)	Greatest (1979)

Singles from Spirits Having Flown
- 1. "Too Much Heaven" Released: November 1978; 2. "Tragedy" Released: February 1979; 3. "Love You Inside Out" Released: April 1979; 4. "Spirits (Having Flown)" Released: December 1979 (UK)

"Love You Inside Out", by The Bee Gees
The Bee Gees' ninth US number one single. It topped the Billboard Top 200 chart in June 1979.

Spirits Having Flown is the fifteenth album by the Bee Gees, released in February 1979, by RSO Records. It was the group's first album after their collaboration on the Saturday Night Fever soundtrack. The album's first three tracks were released as singles and all reached No. 1 in the US, giving the Bee Gees an unbroken run of six US chart-toppers in a one-year period and equaling a feat shared by Bing Crosby, Elvis Presley, and the Beatles. The album's title track was also released as a single in the UK and other European countries.

It was the first Bee Gees album to make the UK top 40 in ten years (not counting the Saturday Night Fever soundtrack album), as well as being their first and only UK No. 1 album. The album also topped the charts in Australia, Canada, Germany, New Zealand, Sweden and the US. It has sold more than 20 million copies worldwide.

Spirits Having Flown marked the end of the band's most successful era, prior to a severe downturn in the early 1980s when they were subject to a near-total radio blackout (particularly in America) that Robin Gibb would refer to as "censorship" and "evil" in interviews.

Reprise Records remastered and re-released the album on CD in 2006, although it did not include any additional bonus tracks, demos or outtakes. Following its acquisition of the Bee Gees catalog in 2016, Universal Music Group reissued the album in 2020 on vinyl through Capitol Records.

== Background and recording ==
At the start of 1978, Barry Gibb produced the album Shadow Dancing by Andy Gibb. In February, Barry wrote the title song for the film Grease performed by Frankie Valli; also in February, another Barry Gibb composition from 1977 "Ain't Nothing Gonna Keep Me From You" was recorded by Teri DeSario. By March, the Bee Gees had started to record this album.

Co-producer Albhy Galuten recalls Spirits Having Flown as being created primarily by Barry Gibb, Karl Richardson and himself putting in long days and nights at Criteria Studios. Blue Weaver recalls others being involved. Both agree at times Robin Gibb was active behind the scenes in songwriting and offering feedback to the recording process, but Maurice Gibb contributed probably the least he did on any Bee Gees album. Not only was his alcoholism sapping his creativity, but he was having back pains finally diagnosed in 1980 as caused by a bad disk. He said that he would be doing bass work and without his knowledge, Barry and Robin would hire in someone else to play parts that he was supposed to be playing; however, he said that whilst he played fine, neither Barry nor Robin could rely on him.

In the recording phase, Robin and Maurice now mainly played the role of backing and harmony vocalists, and even in that capacity Barry did many of the vocal dubs himself as he went over and over the recorded work. Robin contributed one solo lead vocal ("Living Together") which was sung in falsetto with Barry providing alternating lead vocals in his normal register. This was Robin's least amount of lead vocals on any Bee Gees album with the exception of 1970's Cucumber Castle, for which he was not part of the group at that time. As with the last four Bee Gees albums, Maurice did not have a solo lead. Barry's also the lead vocalist on "Too Much Heaven", which consists of 27 layers of vocals, 18 with just Barry and 9 with all three together.

The Bee Gees had been effectively typecast as a disco group after Saturday Night Fever, and in a 1978 interview Barry remarked "People think we're just about disco now. Of course that's not true. If you look at the SNF soundtrack, there's some dance music, but we also have ballads like 'More Than a Woman'." In an attempt to counter this typecasting, the first single from Spirits Having Flown was the ballad "Too Much Heaven". The horn section from Chicago (James Pankow, Walt Parazaider and Lee Loughnane) made a guest appearance on this album. At the time, they were next door working on the Chicago album Hot Streets. Thus the Bee Gees would return the favour as they appeared on Chicago's song "Little Miss Lovin'" and their keyboardist Blue Weaver appeared on "No Tell Lover". The Bee Gees also recorded "Desire" for the album but it was rejected and instead released as a solo single by their brother Andy.

== Release ==
Spirits Having Flown was released on January 24, 1979; it was rushed two weeks early due to American radio leaks. The album was released a few weeks later in New Zealand and South American countries. In the U.S. the album was supported by full page ads in Billboard and Rolling Stone, which gave the album a lengthy and positive review. It topped the album charts in several countries, including both the US and UK. Its three singles "Tragedy", "Too Much Heaven" and "Love You Inside Out" all topped the charts in the US. The title track was also released as a single in the UK and a few other countries in December 1979 to promote the Bee Gees Greatest compilation.

=== Sales ===
The album sold more than 20 million copies worldwide as of 1997. The RIAA certified the album "platinum" for million copies shipped, while selling 4 million copies in United States.

=== Awards ===
Spirits Having Flown was voted Best Pop/Rock Album of 1979 at the 1980 American Music Awards ceremony.

== Critical reception ==
Professional ratings
Review scores
Source	Rating
AllMusic	4.5/5 stars
Christgau's Record Guide	B−
The Encyclopedia of Popular Music	3/5 stars
The Great Rock Discography	6/10
MusicHound Rock: The Essential Album Guide	1/5 stars
(The New) Rolling Stone Album Guide	3/5 stars
Smash Hits	3/10

The Globe and Mail concluded that "the three idiosyncratic voices are still so bleached out and emaciated, and the whole sound so pasteurized by cellophane-wrap production effects that it's difficult to regard the album in terms outside of disco." The New York Times determined that, "like the Motown groups, the Bee Gees stake everything on glittering urbanity."

Bruce Eder of AllMusic considered that while Spirits Having Flown may have "lacked the spirit of freedom and experimentation found on Main Course or Children of the World," the album had a "boldness that manifested itself not only in the singing, but also the most intricate and ambitious production and arrangements of the group's entire history."

== Track listing ==
All tracks are written by Barry, Robin and Maurice Gibb. All lead vocals are done by Barry, except for "Living Together", which is done by Robin and Barry. Lead vocals are adapted from Joseph Brennan.

Side one
No.	Title	Length
1.	"Tragedy"	5:00
2.	"Too Much Heaven"	4:54
3.	"Love You Inside Out"	4:08
4.	"Reaching Out"	4:04
5.	"Spirits (Having Flown)"	5:17

Side two
No.	Title	Length
1.	"Search, Find"	4:11
2.	"Stop (Think Again)"	6:37
3.	"Living Together"	4:18
4.	"I'm Satisfied"	3:53
5.	"Until"	2:25
Total length:		44:47

== Personnel ==
Adapted from the album's liner notes and Joseph Brennan.

Bee Gees

- Barry Gibb – lead vocals, harmony and backing vocals, guitar
- Robin Gibb – co-lead vocals (8), harmony and backing vocals
- Maurice Gibb – harmony and backing vocals, bass guitar, keyboard

The Bee Gees Band

- Dennis Bryon – drums
- Blue Weaver – pianos, ARP synthesizers, vibes
- Alan Kendall – guitars

Guest musicians

- Gary Brown – saxophone solos
- Harold Cowart – bass guitar
- Joe Lala – congas, percussion
- Herbie Mann – flutes (5, 9)
- George Terry – guitar
- Daniel Ben Zubulon – congas
- Albhy Galuten – string conductor

Boneroo Horns

- Bill Purse
- Stan Webb
- Neal Bonsanti
- Peter Graves
- Whit Sidener
- Kenny Faulk

Chicago Horns (2, 7)

- James Pankow
- Walter Parazaider
- Lee Loughnane

Production

- Bee Gees – producers
- Albhy Galuten – producer
- Karl Richardson – producer, engineer
- Dennis Hetzendorfer; John Blanche – assistant engineers
- George Marino – mastering (at Sterling Sound, New York)
- Gene Orloff – string contractor (New York)
- Bob Basso – string contractor (Miami)
- Ed Caraeff Studio – art direction, photography, design

== Charts ==
=== Weekly charts ===
Chart (1979)	Position
Argentinian Album Chart (Prensario)	1
Australian Albums (Kent Music Report)	1
Austrian Albums Chart	2
Belgian Album Chart (Billboard Benelux)	4
Brazilian Album Chart (Top Som)	1
Canadian Albums Chart (CRIA)	1
Dutch Albums Chart (Mega Charts)	3
Finnish Albums (Soumen Virallinen)	1
French Albums Chart (Music Actualites)	1
Italian Album Chart (Musica e dischi)	2
Japanese Albums Chart (Oricon)	2
New Zealand Albums Chart (RIANZ)	1
Norwegian Albums Chart (VG-lista)	1
Portuguese Albums (Musica & Som)	1
Swedish Top 60 Albums	1
UK Albums Chart	1
US Billboard 200	1
West German Albums Chart	1

=== Monthly charts ===
Monthly chart performance for Spirits Having Flown
Chart (1982)	Peak position
Soviet Albums (Moskovskij Komsomolets)	3

=== Year-end charts ===
Chart (1979)	Position
Australian Albums Chart	6
Austrian Albums Chart	4
Canada Top Albums/CDs (RPM)	3
French Albums Chart	21
Japanese Albums Chart (Oricon)	25
UK Albums Chart	7
US Billboard 200	2
West German Albums Chart	10

== Certifications and sales ==
Region	Certification	Certified units/sales
Argentina	—	60,000
Australia	—	215,000
Brazil (Pro-Música Brasil)	Gold	150,000
Canada (Music Canada)	5× Platinum	1,000,000
Denmark	—	100,000
Finland (Musiikkituottajat)	Gold	25,000
France (SNEP)	Gold	300,000
Greece	—	30,000
Hong Kong (IFPI Hong Kong)	Platinum	20,000^{*}
Japan (Oricon Charts)	—	259,000
Malaysia	—	4,000
New Zealand (RMNZ)	Platinum	15,000^{^}
Norway	—	115,000
United Kingdom (BPI)	Platinum	500,000
United States (RIAA)	Platinum	4,000,000
Summaries
Worldwide	—	20,000,000
^{*} Sales figures based on certification alone.^{^} Shipments figures based on certification alone.
