= Alone (Bee Gees song) =

1997 single by Bee Gees

Single by Bee Gees

from the album Still Waters
- B-side: "Closer Than Close"; "Rings Around the Moon"
- Released: 17 February 1997
- Genre: Soft rock
- Length: 4:49 (album version); 4:20 (single edit)
- Label: Polydor
- Songwriters: Barry Gibb; Robin Gibb; Maurice Gibb
- Producers: Barry Gibb; Robin Gibb; Maurice Gibb; Russ Titelman

Bee Gees singles chronology
"How to Fall in Love, Part 1" (1994)	"Alone" (1997)	"I Could Not Love You More" (1997)

Music video
- "Alone" on YouTube

"Alone" is a song by musical group the Bee Gees. The ballad, written by Barry, Robin, and Maurice Gibb, is the opening track on their 21st studio album, Still Waters (1997), and was the first single released from the album on 17 February 1997. In the United Kingdom, the song was backed with two B-sides: "Closer Than Close" and "Rings Around the Moon", while in the United States, a live version of "Stayin' Alive" was included on the single releases.

The track was a worldwide hit, peaking at number five in the United Kingdom and number two in New Zealand, where it was the 10th-most successful single of 1997. In Canada, it reached number 20 and was the most successful adult contemporary song of 1997 according to RPM magazine. On the US Billboard Hot 100, the single peaked at number 28, making it the Bee Gees' 30th and final top-40 hit in the US, after being a Billboard "Hot Shot" debut at number 34.

== Song information ==
Maurice Gibb explained about the track:

That was one of the first ones we wrote for the album. I really remember having a good time writing it. We were sort of set up in the studio here with the three of us just together and I got some bagpipe sounds. We were just screwing around. And BG programmed this groove on the computer. We thought it was cool. We don't actually go in and plan to write a ballad or an R&B song. We just say, 'Let's go that route.' And we'll follow it. And 'Alone' came out of that. I love the line 'I'm on a wheel of fortune with a twist of fate.' Because of the harmony and that chorus, it was like a bit of '50s as well. And I like the idea of being that sort of Beatlesque type of song. I wanted that rambling. That sort of Byrds type, the 12-string thing going, but we just did it with the bagpipes instead and made it all connect. It was a very exciting demo. We weren't too sure about the bagpipes, but Robin actually persisted. He said, 'They're great; you gotta keep the bagpipes.'

Barry and Robin Gibb alternate on lead vocals on the track, with both mostly using the group's trademark falsetto.

== Critical reception ==
British magazine Music Week rated the song four out of five, adding, "Brits lifetime award-winners should crashland in the top five with their instantly-familiar harmonies and Barry Gibb's sure pop production (cod bagpipes over an ELO-style arrangement this time)."

== Music video ==
Two promotional videos directed by Nick Egan were made for the song. The first one, not shown in the United States, featured the brothers singing in a spinning room intercut with a female astronaut slowly removing her space suit in zero gravity, a homage to the opening of the 1968 sci-fi cult film Barbarella. The promo for the US featured the brothers recording the song in a studio, intercut with various clips of the brothers throughout the years, as well as segments of the original video.

== Track listings ==
- UK CD1; Australian CD single; Japanese mini-CD single
1. "Alone" – 4:49
2. "Closer Than Close" – 4:34
3. "Rings Around the Moon" – 4:29
- UK CD2
1. "Alone" – 4:49
2. "How Deep Is Your Love" – 4:02
3. "Words" – 3:13
4. "I've Gotta Get a Message to You" – 3:06
- UK cassette single and European CD single
1. "Alone" – 4:49
2. "Closer Than Close" – 4:34
- US CD single
1. "Alone" (single mix) – 4:02
2. "Stayin' Alive" (live) – 4:06
3. "You Should Be Dancing" (Decadance) – 8:42
4. "Rings Around the Moon" – 4:29
- US cassette single

A. "Alone" (single mix) – 4:20
B. "Stayin' Alive" (live) – 4:06

== Personnel ==
Personnel are sourced from Joseph Brennan.

- Barry Gibb – vocals, guitar, programming, producer
- Robin Gibb – vocals, producer
- Maurice Gibb – vocals, guitar, keyboard, producer
- Marc Schumann – guitar
- Robbie Kondor – keyboard
- Alan Clark – keyboard
- Jeff Bova – synthesizer bass
- David Elliott – drums
- Dave Halpern – percussion
- Ralph McDonald – percussion
- Russ Titelman – producer

== Charts ==
=== Weekly charts ===
Chart (1997)	Peak position
Australia (ARIA)	7
Austria (Ö3 Austria Top 40)	4
Belgium (Ultratop 50 Flanders)	31
Belgium (Ultratop 50 Wallonia)	6
Canada Top Singles (RPM)	20
Canada Adult Contemporary (RPM)	1
Czech Republic (IFPI CR)	5
Estonia (Eesti Top 20)	1
Estonia Airplay (Eesti Top 20)	1
Europe (Eurochart Hot 100)	8
France (SNEP)	4
Germany (GfK)	6
Hungary (Mahasz)	6
Iceland (Íslenski Listinn Topp 40)	32
Ireland (IRMA)	5
Israel (Israeli Singles Chart)	13
Netherlands (Dutch Top 40)	35
Netherlands (Single Top 100)	28
New Zealand (Recorded Music NZ)	2
Norway (VG-lista)	15
Poland Airplay (Music & Media)	1
Scottish Singles Sales (Official Charts)	4
Sweden (Sverigetopplistan)	25
Switzerland (Schweizer Hitparade)	8
UK Singles (Official Charts)	5
US Billboard Hot 100	28
US Adult Contemporary (Billboard)	8

=== Year-end charts ===
Chart (1997)	Position
Australia (ARIA)	39
Austria (Ö3 Austria Top 40)	25
Belgium (Ultratop 50 Wallonia)	40
Canada Adult Contemporary (RPM)	1
Europe (Eurochart Hot 100)	33
France (SNEP)	34
Germany (Media Control)	28
Netherlands (Single Top 100)	91
New Zealand (RIANZ)	10
Romania (Romanian Top 100)	26
Switzerland (Schweizer Hitparade)	24
UK Singles (OCC)	54
US Adult Contemporary (Billboard)	30

== Certifications ==
Region	Certification	Certified units/sales
Australia (ARIA)	Platinum	70,000^{^}
Germany (BVMI)	Gold	250,000^{^}
New Zealand (RMNZ)	Gold	5,000^{*}
United Kingdom (BPI)	Silver	200,000^{^}
^{*} Sales figures based on certification alone.^{^} Shipments figures based on certification alone.

== Release history ==
Region	Date	Format(s)	Label(s)	Ref.
United Kingdom	17 February 1997	CD; cassette	Polydor	
Japan	12 March 1997	Mini-CD	Polydor	
United States	25 March 1997	Contemporary hit radio	Polydor	
United States	20 May 1997	7-inch vinyl; CD; cassette	Polydor	

== Cover versions ==
"Alone" was covered by American country music artist Monty Holmes on his 1998 debut album, All I Ever Wanted. It was released as the album's second single and peaked at number 53 on the Billboard Hot Country Singles & Tracks chart.
