= Love You Inside Out =

Single by Bee Gees

from the album Spirits Having Flown
- B-side: "I'm Satisfied"
- Released: 6 April 1979
- Recorded: 1978
- Genre: Funk; disco; lounge
- Length: 4:12 (album version); 3:48 (7" version)
- Label: RSO
- Songwriter: Barry, Robin & Maurice Gibb
- Producers: Bee Gees, Albhy Galuten, Karl Richardson

Bee Gees singles chronology
"Tragedy" (1979)	"Love You Inside Out" (1979)	"Spirits (Having Flown)" (1979)

"Love You Inside Out" is a 1979 single by the Bee Gees from their album, Spirits Having Flown. It was their last chart-topping single on the Billboard Hot 100, spending one week at #1 in June 1979, when it knocked Donna Summer's "Hot Stuff" off the top spot. It was the third #1 single from the album. In the UK, the single peaked at No. 13 for two weeks. It was the ninth and final number-one hit for the Bee Gees in the US, and the twelfth and final number-one hit in Canada as well. The trio would not return to the top 10 for ten years, with the song, "One".

== Background ==
The song is a slow funk groove number. During recording, the Bee Gees played a prank on their manager Robert Stigwood, sending him a version with the line "backwards and forwards with my cock hanging out" to see if he was paying attention to their work. For the released version, the line is "backwards and forwards with my heart hanging out".

== Achievements ==
"Love You Inside Out" was a milestone single for the Bee Gees, earning them a permanent place in rock history when it reached number one on the US Billboard charts. It was the group's ninth number one single in the US (tenth if you include "Lonely Days", which reached number one on the Cashbox charts in 1971), more number-one singles than any other 1970s’ artist. It was also The Bee Gees’ sixth consecutive number-one single in a single year; the only other group to achieve this was The Beatles. Moreover, it was the third consecutive number-one single from Spirits Having Flown, which followed three consecutive number-one singles from their previous album Saturday Night Fever. At that point, no other artist had ever had three consecutive number-one singles from two successive albums. It also placed them fourth among all artists with number one singles (9) and fourth in total weeks (27) at number one.

The song debuted at #28 in the United Kingdom.

== Reception ==
Billboard called it a "disco flavored hook laden tune that is paced by its patented falsetto and harmonies ." Billboard picked "Love You Inside Out" as one of the best cuts on Spirits Having Flown. Cash Box called it a "finely arranged and performed love song." Record World said it "has light disco overtones and [the Bee Gees'] high vocal harmonies."

Smash Hits called it a, "mellow, mid-tempo jog, which is typically well-produced and typically shrill in the vocal department. I have to admit, I think it's dull. Not bad, just dull.

== Personnel ==
- Barry Gibb – lead, harmony and backing vocals, acoustic guitar
- Robin Gibb – backing vocals
- Maurice Gibb – bass, backing vocals
- Alan Kendall – electric guitar
- Dennis Bryon – drums
- Blue Weaver – synthesizer, keyboards, programming
- George Terry – electric guitar

== Charts ==
=== Weekly charts ===
Chart (1979)	Peak position
Australia (Kent Music Report)	77
Belgium (Ultratop 50)	23
Canada (RPM) Adult Contemporary	1
Canada (RPM) Top Singles	1
France (SNEP)	39
Germany (Media Control Charts)	21
Ireland (IRMA)	6
Italy (FIMI)	17
Netherlands (Dutch Top 40)	35
New Zealand (Recorded Music NZ)	17
UK Singles (Official Charts Company)	13
US Billboard Hot 100	1
US Billboard Hot Adult Contemporary	15
US Billboard Hot Soul Singles	57
US Cash Box Top 100	2
US Radio & Records	3
US Record World	3

=== Year-end charts ===
Chart (1979)	Position
Canada	19
US Billboard Hot 100	33
US Cash Box	45

== Certifications ==
Region	Certification	Certified units/sales
Canada (Music Canada)	Gold	75,000^{^}
United States (RIAA)	Gold	1,000,000^{^}
^{^} Shipments figures based on certification alone.

== Samples and covers ==
In 1996, the R&B group Total sampled the song on the album track "When Boy Meets Girl" from their self-titled debut in 1996. In 2004, the song was covered by Feist (under the title "Inside and Out") on her 2004 album Let It Die. It was released as the third single from the album in 2004. Saxophonist Arturo Tappin's smooth jazz version (Love You Inside and Out) is on his 2007 "Inside Out" album. "Love You Inside Out" was sampled by Snoop Dogg for his rap single "Ups & Downs" in 2005, as well as on rap group Nemesis' hit "Cantifiguritout". This song was also sampled on R. Kelly and Jay-Z's hit song "Honey".
