= Tragedy (Bee Gees song) =

1979 song by the Bee Gees

Single by Bee Gees

from the album Spirits Having Flown
- B-side: "Until"
- Released: February 1979
- Recorded: 1978
- Genre: Dance-rock; disco
- Length: 5:03
- Label: RSO
- Songwriter: Barry, Robin & Maurice Gibb
- Producers: Bee Gees; Albhy Galuten; Karl Richardson

Bee Gees singles chronology
"Too Much Heaven" (1978)	"Tragedy" (1979)	"Love You Inside Out" (1979)

Music video
- "Tragedy" on YouTube

"Tragedy" is a song released by the Bee Gees, written by Barry, Robin & Maurice Gibb, and included on their fifteenth album, Spirits Having Flown (1979). The single was released in February 1979 by RSO Records, reaching number one in several charts including the UK in February 1979 and repeating the feat the following month on the US Billboard Hot 100. In 1998, it was covered by British pop group Steps, whose version also reached number one in the UK. Both versions also went to number one in New Zealand. In 2024, it was used in the film Beetlejuice Beetlejuice, as well as its trailer.

== Origin ==
Barry, Robin and Maurice Gibb wrote this song and "Too Much Heaven" in an afternoon off from making the Sgt. Pepper's Lonely Hearts Club Band movie, in which they were starring. In the same evening, they wrote "Shadow Dancing", which was performed by Andy Gibb (and reached number one in the US).

The explosion sound effect at the song's climax has been the subject of much interest.

In 2019, co-producer Karl Richardson told writer Grant Walters of Albumism how they processed the raw sound of Barry Gibb cupping his hands over and blowing air into a studio microphone to make it sound like an authentic "boom":

"It was a thing called a product generator. It was a new toy that someone...you know, we were in tune with all the [Audio Engineering Society] shows—you know, 'what's the new stuff coming out?' And I guess we just got a sample of it. It was a box and you put two inputs in it, and it generates all these harmonics and products.

"So, the two things that went into it were Albhy [Galuten], or maybe [keyboardist] Blue [Weaver], holding the notes on the bottom end of a piano across multiple keys—maybe as many keys as you could mash down on a grand piano—and then Barry's voice going 'pbbhhhh!' into a dynamic microphone, blowing air through the diaphragm to distort it. And then you mix these two signals through the generator, and whatever came out sounded like dynamite [laughs]. It was very technological—nobody had that sound, I know that for a fact."

Staged footage of the recording the explosion effect was filmed at Criteria Studios in the summer of 1979 for a Bee Gees special that aired on NBC later in the year; the de facto sessions for the song had occurred in 1978.

Though not originally in Saturday Night Fever, "Tragedy" has subsequently been added to the musical score of the West End version of the movie-musical. The song knocked "I Will Survive" by Gloria Gaynor off the top spot in the US for two weeks before that song again returned to number one for an additional week. "Tragedy" was the second single out of the three released from the album to interrupt a song's stay at #1.

In the US, it would become the fifth of six consecutive number-ones, tying the record with Bing Crosby, Elvis Presley, and the Beatles for most consecutive number-ones in the US—a record later broken by Whitney Houston, who had seven.

On 1 November 2024, an animated music video for the song was released on the Bee Gees' official YouTube channel.

== Reception ==
American magazine Billboard felt that the song had similar intensity to "Stayin' Alive" and that it had multiple vocal and instrumental hooks and "graceful" harmonies. Cash Box said it has "vibrant arrangement of synthesizer, guitars, horns, solid beat and dramatic vocals." Record World called it "sizzling" and "up-tempo" and "with some classic progressions, high harmonies and an undercurrent of synthesizers."

== Charts ==
=== Weekly charts ===
Chart (1979)	Peak position
Australia (Kent Music Report)	2
Austria (Ö3 Austria Top 40)	2
Belgium (Ultratop 50 Flanders)	3
Canada Top Singles (RPM)	1
Canada Disco Singles (RPM)	7
Europe (Eurochart Hot 100)	1
Finland (Suomen Virallinen)	7
France (SNEP)	1
Ireland (IRMA)	1
Italy (Musica e dischi)	1
Netherlands (Dutch Top 40)	4
Netherlands (Single Top 100)	5
New Zealand (Recorded Music NZ)	1
Norway (VG-lista)	4
South Africa (Springbok Radio)	2
Spain (PROMUSICAE)	1
Sweden (Sverigetopplistan)	6
Switzerland (Schweizer Hitparade)	2
UK Singles (OCC)	1
US Billboard Hot 100	1
US Adult Contemporary (Billboard)	19
US Hot Dance Club Play (Billboard)	22
US Hot R&B Singles (Billboard)	44
US Cash Box Top 100	1
US Record World Singles	1
West Germany (GfK)	2

=== Year-end charts ===
Chart (1979)	Position
Australia (Kent Music Report)	37
Austria (Ö3 Austria Top 40)	18
Belgium (Ultratop Flanders)	33
Canada Top Singles (RPM)	12
Netherlands (Dutch Top 40)	45
Netherlands (Single Top 100)	37
New Zealand (Recorded Music NZ)	15
South Africa (Springbok Radio)	14
UK Singles (OCC)	15
US Billboard Hot 100	16
US Cash Box Top 100	19
West Germany (Official German Charts)	30

== Sales and certifications ==
Region	Certification	Certified units/sales
Canada (Music Canada)	Platinum	150,000^{^}
France (SNEP)	Gold	500,000^{*}
Japan	—	100,000
United Kingdom (BPI)	Gold	500,000^{^}
United States (RIAA)	Platinum	2,000,000^{^}
^{*} Sales figures based on certification alone.^{^} Shipments figures based on certification alone.

== Steps version ==
"Tragedy"

Single by Steps

from the album Steptacular and Bee Gees Tribute Album: Gotta Get a Message to You
- A-side: "Heartbeat" (double A-side)
- B-side: "Stay with Me" (US)
- Released: 9 November 1998
- Studio: PWL (London and Manchester, England)
- Genre: Dance-pop
- Length: 4:31 (album version); 3:30 (radio edit)
- Label: Jive; Ebul
- Songwriter: Barry, Robin & Maurice Gibb
- Producers: Andrew Frampton; Pete Waterman

Steps singles chronology
"One for Sorrow" (1998)	"Heartbeat" / "Tragedy" (1998)	"Better Best Forgotten" (1999)

Music video
- "Tragedy" on YouTube

"Tragedy" was covered by British pop group Steps. Issued as a double A-side with "Heartbeat", it was released on 9 November 1998 by Jive Records and Ebul. The song was recorded for the Bee Gees Tribute Album: Gotta Get a Message to You, produced by Andrew Frampton and Pete Waterman, and later included on the group's second album, Steptacular (1999). "Heartbeat" / "Tragedy" reached number one in the United Kingdom and New Zealand. In the former country, it spent 30 weeks on the UK Singles Chart and sold more copies than all three previous Steps singles combined, with 1.21 million copies sold in the UK. The video for "Tragedy", directed by David Amphlett, contained the dance step of putting both hands parallel to the sides of the head in time with the word "tragedy", which became a signature move for the group. In 2023, Official Charts Company ranked it the 87th best-selling single of all time on the Official UK Chart.

=== Critical reception ===
Scottish Aberdeen Evening Express stated that Steps "did such a sparkling remake" of the song, noting that it "gets [Steptacular] off to a discotastic start". AllMusic editor Jon O'Brien described it as a "triumphant cover". Retrospectively, Lucas Villa from AXS wrote that group members Claire, Faye and Lisa's "powerful performances (coupled with that iconic hands dance step) made 'Tragedy' an undeniable dance floor anthem." Daily Record stated, "Once again, Steps have come up with a catchy tune and the reworking of 'Tragedy' has clubbers mimicking the band's dance techniques." In 2003, English music journalist Paul Morley included Steps' version of the song in his list of "Greatest Pop Single of All Time".

=== Music video ===
The accompanying music video for "Tragedy" was directed by David Amphlett. It starts with a Doraemon-shaped alarm clock ringing and sees Faye, Claire, and Lisa getting married. The lads, Lee and H, sabotage all three weddings before they all go to a disco. The church and disco scenes were filmed in All Saints' Church, Harrow Weald, London and the adjoining Blackwell Hall, respectively. The external location shots of the boys leaving their house and driving were filmed in Blackheath, South London. The group's actual families all took part in the video, with the girls' real-life fathers walking them down the aisle, and record producer Pete Waterman appears as the wedding DJ.

=== Track listings ===
- UK and Australian CD single
1. "Heartbeat" – 4:24
2. "Tragedy" – 4:31
3. "Heartbeat" (instrumental) – 4:24
- UK cassette single and European CD single
1. "Heartbeat" – 4:24
2. "Tragedy" – 4:31
- US CD and cassette single
1. "Tragedy" (LP version) – 4:30
2. "Stay with Me" – 4:04

=== Credits and personnel ===
Credits are adapted from the liner notes of Steptacular.

Recording

- Recorded at PWL Studios (London and Manchester, England)
- Additionally recorded at The Workhouse Studios and Sarm East (London, England)
- Mixed at PWL Studios (London and Manchester, England)
- Mastered at Transfermation (London, England)

Personnel

- Songwriting – Barry, Robin and Maurice Gibb
- Production – Mark Topham, Karl Twigg, Pete Waterman
- Mixing – Dan Frampton, Paul Waterman
- Engineering – Chris McDonnell
- Drums – Chris McDonnell
- Keyboards – Karl Twigg
- Guitar – Mark Topham
- Bass – Mark Topham

=== Charts ===
==== Weekly charts ====
Chart (1998–1999)	Peak position
Australia (ARIA)	10
Belgium (Ultratop 50 Flanders)	8
Belgium (Ultratop 50 Wallonia)	27
Europe (Eurochart Hot 100)	6
Greece (IFPI)	10
Ireland (IRMA)	2
Netherlands (Dutch Top 40)	22
Netherlands (Single Top 100)	24
New Zealand (Recorded Music NZ)	1
Scottish Singles Sales (Official Charts)	1
Spain (Top 40 Radio)	40
Sweden (Sverigetopplistan)	4
UK Singles (Official Charts)	1
UK Indie (Official Charts)	1

==== Year-end charts ====
Chart (1998)	Position
Belgium (Ultratop 50 Flanders)	68
UK Singles (OCC)	12

Chart (1999)	Position
Australia (ARIA)	92
Europe (Eurochart Hot 100)	46
Netherlands (Dutch Top 40)	132
New Zealand (RIANZ)	48
Sweden (Hitlistan)	30
UK Singles (OCC)	19

=== Certifications ===
Region	Certification	Certified units/sales
Belgium (BRMA)	Gold	25,000^{*}
New Zealand (RMNZ)	Platinum	10,000^{*}
Sweden (GLF)	Gold	15,000^{^}
United Kingdom (BPI)	2× Platinum	1,210,000
United States	—	98,000
^{*} Sales figures based on certification alone.^{^} Shipments figures based on certification alone.

=== Release history ===
Region	Version	Date	Format(s)	Label(s)	Ref.
United Kingdom	"Heartbeat" / "Tragedy"	9 November 1998	CD; cassette	Jive; Ebul	
United States	"Tragedy"	18 January 2000	Contemporary hit radio	Jive; Ebul	

== Foo Fighters version ==
In 2021, American rock band Foo Fighters, under their alter ego "Dee Gees", covered the song for their album Hail Satin.

== See also ==
- List of Hot 100 number-one singles of 1979 (U.S.)
- List of million-selling singles in the United Kingdom
- List of UK Singles Chart number ones of the 1970s
