= Too Much Heaven =

1978 single by Bee Gees

- Dutch vinyl single

Single by Bee Gees

from the album Spirits Having Flown
- B-side: "Rest Your Love on Me"
- Released: 24 October 1978
- Recorded: July 1978
- Studio: Criteria (Miami)
- Genre: Soul; R&B
- Length: 4:58
- Label: RSO
- Songwriters: Barry Gibb; Robin Gibb; Maurice Gibb
- Producers: Bee Gees; Albhy Galuten; Karl Richardson

Bee Gees singles chronology
"Night Fever" (1978)	"Too Much Heaven" (1978)	"Tragedy" (1979)

Music video
- "Too Much Heaven" on YouTube

"Too Much Heaven" is a song by the Bee Gees, which was the band's contribution to the "Music for UNICEF" fund. They performed it at the Music for UNICEF Concert on 9 January 1979. The song later found its way to the group's thirteenth original album, Spirits Having Flown. It hit No. 1 in both the US and Canada. In the United States, the song was the first single out of three from the album to interrupt a song's stay at number one. "Too Much Heaven" knocked "Le Freak" off the top spot for two weeks before "Le Freak" returned to number one again. "Too Much Heaven" also rose to the top three in the UK. In the US, it would become the fourth of six consecutive No. 1s, equaling the record set by Bing Crosby, Elvis Presley, and the Beatles for the most consecutive No. 1 songs. The six Bee Gee songs are "How Deep Is Your Love", "Stayin' Alive", "Night Fever", "Too Much Heaven", "Tragedy" and "Love You Inside Out". The songs spanned the years of 1977, 1978 and 1979.

Robin Gibb reportedly said on the Bee Gees' interview for Billboard in 2001 that this track was one of his favourite songs of the Bee Gees.

== Background and recording ==
Barry Gibb, Robin Gibb and Maurice Gibb wrote this track with "Tragedy" in an afternoon off from making the Sgt. Pepper's Lonely Hearts Club Band movie; that same evening, the Gibbs wrote "Shadow Dancing" for Andy Gibb (but that song was later credited to all four Gibbs)

The recording process was the longest of all the tracks on Spirits Having Flown as there are nine layers of three-part harmony, creating 27 voices, though the high falsetto voices are the most pronounced in the final mix:

- Barry on falsetto lead three times
- falsetto high harmony three times
- falsetto low harmony three times
- Barry on natural voice lead three times
- high harmony three times
- low harmony three times
- Barry, Robin and Maurice together on lead three times
- high harmony three times
- low harmony three times

Imbued with their falsetto style, it is also notable for being one of two songs on the album featuring the Chicago horn section (Lee Loughnane, James Pankow, and Walter Parazaider); the other track that features the Chicago members is "Stop (Think Again)", in return for the brothers' appearance on the Chicago song "Little Miss Lovin'". On its demo version, Barry begins with count-in. This track does have some backing vocals. The demo lacks the full orchestral feel of the final song.

== Release ==
"Too Much Heaven" was released nine months after "Night Fever". The single "Too Much Heaven" was released in the late autumn of 1978 and started a slow ascent up the music charts. In the first week of 1979, preceding the Music for UNICEF Concert, the single first topped the charts in both the United States and Canada. In the United Kingdom, the single peaked at number three late in 1978. In the summer of 1978, the Gibb brothers announced their latest project at a news conference at the United Nations in New York City. All of the publishing royalties on their next single would go into UNICEF, to celebrate the International Year of the Child, which was designated to be 1979. The song earned over $7 million in publishing royalties.

The Bee Gees were later invited to the White House, where President Jimmy Carter thanked the group for their donation. At the ceremony, the brothers presented Carter with one of their black satin tour jackets. In later years, the brothers performed the song with only Barry's guitar and keyboards, with all three singing in their normal range. This version was part of a medley the brothers did as part of their 1989 One For All tour, and is also included on the Tales from the Brothers Gibb box set alongside the original version.

"Too Much Heaven" also reached No. 2 in Cash Box charts in six weeks between 30 December 1978 and 3 February 1979 behind Chic's "Le Freak".

== Reception ==
Cash Box said it is "gentle and silky with the famous falsettos rising upwards." Record World called it a "flowing ballad, with [the Bee Gees'] trademark falsettos and a light touch."

Brian Wilson of the Beach Boys spoke positively of the song, stating, "I was really loved and impressed with the harmonies they achieved on that record. I'm very very proud of those guys; they're exceptionally good at harmony. They’re a very heavy duty harmony group."

== Charts ==
=== Weekly charts ===
Chart (1978–1979)	Peak position
Argentina	1
Australia (Kent Music Report)	5
Austria (Ö3 Austria Top 40)	13
Belgium (Ultratop 50)	8
Brazil (ABPD)	1
Canada Top Singles (RPM)	1
Canada RPM Adult Contemporary	1
Chile	1
China	5
Finland	4
France (SNEP)	2
Germany (Media Control Charts)	10
Ireland (IRMA)	2
Italy (Musica e dischi)	1
Netherlands (Dutch Top 40)	2
New Zealand (Recorded Music NZ)	1
Norway (VG-lista)	1
Portugal (Musica & Som)	3
South Africa (Springbok Radio)	1
Spain (AFYVE)	1
Sweden (Sverigetopplistan)	1
Switzerland (Swiss Hitparade)	1
UK Singles (Official Charts Company)	3
US Billboard Hot 100	1
US Billboard Easy Listening Charts	4
US Billboard Hot Soul Singles	10
US Cash Box	2
US Radio & Records	1
US Record World	1

=== Year-end charts ===
Chart (1978–1979)	Position
Australia (Kent Music Report)	32
Brazil (ABPD)	3
Canada Top Singles (RPM)	22
New Zealand (RIANZ)	49
South Africa (Springbok Radio)	2
Sweden (Topplistan)	13
Switzerland (Swiss Hitparade)	14
US Billboard Hot 100	11
US Cash Box	2

== Certifications ==
Region	Certification	Certified units/sales
Canada (Music Canada)	Platinum	150,000^{^}
France (SNEP)	Gold	800,000
United Kingdom (BPI)	Gold	500,000^{^}
United States (RIAA)	Platinum	2,000,000^{^}
^{^} Shipments figures based on certification alone.

== Nana version ==
"Too Much Heaven"

Single by Nana

from the album Father
- Released: 1 December 1997
- Recorded: 1997
- Genre: Hip hop
- Length: 3:56 (single version); 3:59 (album version)
- Label: Motor Music
- Songwriters: Barry, Robin & Maurice Gibb
- Producers: Bülent Aris, Toni Cottura

Nana singles chronology
"Bible in My Hand" (1997)	"Too Much Heaven" (1997)	"Remember the Time" (1998)

In 1997, Nana covered the hit for his album Father. Compared to the original, this version is increasingly listening to rap passages while retaining much of the original's lyrics. Nana is responsible for the rap, while Van der Toorn sings the lyrics and chorus of the original. In German-speaking countries, this cover version was a top ten success. In Germany, this version was also awarded with Gold.

=== Music video ===
The music video plays both in a sky setting and in a detached house. In a family home, the coexistence of a large family is the focus. In parallel, Nana mimics the song in the sky and beamed to the extended family. In the course of the video, the parents argue in the video, but find themselves together again in the end.

=== Track listing ===
CD maxi

1. Too Much Heaven – 3:56
2. One Second (Nana feat. Alex Prince) – 5:40
3. Lonely – 6:09

=== Charts ===
Chart (1997–98)	Position
Austria (Ö3 Austria Top 40)	6
Germany (GfK)	2
Switzerland (Schweizer Hitparade)	7

==== Year-end charts ====
Chart (1998)	Position
Germany (Media Control)	38

=== Certifications ===
Region	Certification	Certified units/sales
Germany (BVMI)	Gold	250,000^{^}
^{^} Shipments figures based on certification alone.

== Other cover versions ==
- In 1979, the Cantonese singer Alan Tam covered and released it as 唱一首好歌 ("Sing A Good Song"). That same year, Malaysian band Alleycats made their Malay cover of this song titled Kembalilah Kepadaku (lit. 'Come Back to Me').
- Hip hop boy band US5 released a cover of "Too Much Heaven" in 2007 as a duet with Robin Gibb. "Too Much Heaven" was their first single with new member Vincent.
- Norwegian pop duo M2M used the chorus from "Too Much Heaven" in the chorus of their own song "Our Song" which appears on their debut album Shades of Purple.
- British soul singer Beverley Knight released a cover version of "Too Much Heaven" in 2009 on her album 100%. Knight's version featured backing vocals at the request of Robin Gibb, as they had previously collaborated on the song live.
- Paul McCartney recorded this song in December 2004 in Sussex as a tribute to Maurice Gibb but it was not released.
- American gospel recording group Winans Phase 2, released a cover of "Too Much Heaven" on their 2000 album, We Got Next.
- In 1999, South Korean singer, 조관우 (Joe Kwan Woo) covered the song on his album Special 99 Edition.
- American R&B singer-songwriter Criss Starr released a cover version of "Too Much Heaven" for his Yours 4Ever CD in 2013.
- British comedian Tim Vine occasionally closes his shows by performing a comedic version of the song.
- Barry Gibb re-recorded the song with Alison Krauss as part of his 2021 album Greenfields.
- Tragedy, the all metal tribute to the Bee Gees, recorded a cover of this song using instrumentals from the song "Kashmir" by Led Zepplin.
