= High Civilization =

Studio album by the Bee Gees
- Released: 25 March 1991
- Recorded: August – December 1990
- Studios: Middle Ear Studios (Miami Beach, Florida)
- Genres: Dance; pop; techno-rock; Euro-disco; R&B; electronic
- Length: 60:12
- Labels: Warner Bros.; Warner Music
- Producers: Barry, Robin and Maurice Gibb

The Bee Gees chronology
| The Very Best of the Bee Gees (1990) | High Civilization (1991) | Size Isn't Everything (1993) |

Singles from High Civilization
- 1. "Secret Love" Released: February 1991; 2. "When He's Gone" Released: May 1991; 3. "The Only Love" Released: August 1991

High Civilization is the nineteenth studio album by British-Australian pop group the Bee Gees, released on 25 March 1991 in the United Kingdom and 14 May 1991 in the United States. It was their third and final album on Warner Bros. Records, following the release of the successful comeback albums E.S.P. (1987) and One (1989), and was self-produced by the group in their Miami studio.

Recorded with a small group of musicians, High Civilization was the first of two Bee Gees albums recorded with Prince's engineer Femi Jiya, whose preference for hard, loud percussion ensured that the drums and beats are loud in the mix, pushing the Bee Gees' vocal harmonies further back. The album favours a dance style with electronic instruments and studio effects, such as programmed drums and synthesisers, and features an eclectic array of material including art rock songs and love ballads. The record features high concept lyrical imagery and themes of romance.

On release, the album reached number 24 on the UK Albums Chart and was also successful in Germany, where it was heavily promoted. However, it did not chart in the United States. The Motown tribute "Secret Love" was issued as the lead single and reached number five on the UK Singles Chart. Music critics commented on the album's dense production and lengthy songs, which some Bee Gees biographers have dismissed. The Bee Gees promoted the album with a 1991 European tour that spanned 23 cities; it included several shows in Berlin that were filmed and a London concert that was broadcast on BBC Radio 1.

== Background and recording ==
Having kept a low profile for much of the 1980s, the Bee Gees signed to Warner Bros. Records for their successful comeback album E.S.P. (1987), featuring the worldwide number one hit "You Win Again". This was followed by the similarly successful One (1989), whose title track was an American top-ten hit. Beginning in May 1989, the Bee Gees undertook the One for All Tour, their first live tour in nearly a decade, as a sign of enthusiasm for their new material. The tour began in Germany, before reaching the United States, Australia and finally in Japan in December. In 1990, as recognition of what The Courier-Post described as their "serious image problem", the Bee Gees repudiated their late 1970s Saturday Night Fever period in a set of interviews, but these were largely ignored by the public. When playing London's Wembley Arena on the One for All Tour, the group had truncated their Saturday Night Fever songs into a reluctant medley, undercutting them with jokes about falsetto, but were visibly taken aback by the positive audience reaction.

High Civilization has been described as a further attempt to move the band beyond their association with Saturday Night Fever. The members of the Bee Gees—brothers Barry, Robin and Maurice Gibb—produced the album themselves and worked on it in their Miami Beach-based Middle Ear Studios for almost a year, primarily recording it between August and December 1990. Like its predecessors, High Civilization was recorded with a small group of musicians, namely guitarist Alan Kendall and bassist George "Chocolate" Perry—both of whom had played with the band before—as well as keyboardist and programmer Tim Moore and percussionist Lenny Castro. As was often the case with Bee Gees albums, Barry and Maurice contributed guitar work, while Maurice also performed keyboards. It was the first of two consecutive Bee Gees albums to feature Prince's engineer Femi Jiya. Barry denied that financial gain was their motivation for recording the album, saying: "We don't make records to make money – we don't need to anymore. But we are creative people and we want to have hits, to make records that people like. I don't see anything wrong with that."

In late 1990, after the completion of the album, the Bee Gees' status in music culture was recognised with the career-spanning retrospective box set Tales from the Brothers Gibb: A History in Song, 1967–1990, while outside the United States, the 21-track compilation The Very Best of the Bee Gees was concurrently released to capitalise on the lucrative Christmas market. "How Deep Is Your Love" (1977) was reissued as a single in the United Kingdom, while in the Netherlands, "Words" (1968) was issued instead. The marketing strategy was effective, and the album was a success in the UK, Europe and Australia. Commenting on releasing High Civilization soon after the compilation, Barry said: "The new album will surprise a lot of people, and it's perfectly timed after this greatest hits package, the old and the new." In February 1991, before the new album's release, the Bee Gees were surprised with an appearance on This Is Your Life.

== Composition ==
=== Musical style and themes ===
According to biographer Bob Stanley, High Civilization returns to the clattering percussion from E.S.P.—which had been absent from One—with "on-the-money 1991 drum programming." As the album's engineer, Jiya favoured hard, loud percussion—a mix of live and synthesized beats—and brought it to the front of the mix, pushing the Gibbs' vocals further back. Resultingly, although the group's vocals were usually their focal point, the album downplays them in favour of electronic instruments such as synthesisers, electronic drums, studio gimmicks and special effects. The "heavy production and programmed rhythms" contribute to the album's "less pop approach" relative to One, and the sound has been variously described by some as cold and mechanical or sharp and clear. According to The Courier-Post, the group "[went] out of their way to sound like anything but themselves" by purposely de-emphasising their "highly breathy harmonies". Robert Tilli of Music & Media believes that in moving the group's trademark falsettos behind the "heavy drum programming", the Bee Gees' sound had become "more American" than usual.

While commenting that the Bee Gees were continuing to put "a bit more distance between their new and old selves", reviewer Deborah Wilker comments that the diverse album profiles features typical of the Bee Gees, such as "airy arrangements that sail over pretty melodies, fluid harmonies, strong musicianship and light production". The music is more uptempo than that of its two immediate predecessors, which were more focused on an adult contemporary style, and some songs feature tough grooves. However, journalist William R. Macklin considers all three albums to uniformly comprise "eclectic, state-of-the-art pop", and describes High Civilization as a big-sounding album with a "wide-screen, Technicolor approach to production". Fellow journalist Dave Larsen believed that, to achieve a contemporary sound, the Bee Gees used beats reminiscent of Bobby Brown ("Dimensions") and Mariah Carey ("Human Sacrifice").

As the first Bee Gees album issued primarily as a CD, High Civilization is longer than the group's earlier albums, exceeding an hour in length. Stanley believes that the album compensates for its lack of musical subtlety with "high-concept lyrical weirdness", adding that—according to Bee Gees scholar Joseph Brennan—the album originally revolved around a dreamlike, contradictory story of "secret love" that might be "all in the singer's head", but that this concept was deliberately undercut by the group changing the track sequence for the final record. Lyrical themes include romance, heartache and dating, with the group's characteristic falsettos and harmonies intact. The music has been compared to Yes and Prince. The electronic songs "Party with No Name", "Dimensions" and "When He's Gone" all feature Kendall's wailing, late 1980s-style glam metal guitar work.

=== Songs ===
The album's title track is an art rock song, defined by what reviewer Dean Lynn Ford calls a "cluttered, clanking and highly cerebral" sound that evokes construction workers "building a brink-of-Armageddon ladder to heaven", as well as a jerky chorus melody that Stanley compares to mid-1980s Level 42. Deemed a world-weary "quasi-protest song", its unusual dystopian lyrics depict a journey across Los Angeles, Rome, Afghanistan, Cairo and Iran. The record's shortest song, "Secret Love" is a melodic love song that eschews dance music for bubblegum. Considered a tribute to Motown, it features a beat evocative of the early 1960s, and has been compared to the Bee Gees' earlier song "Chain Reaction" (1985). "When He's Gone", which features Robin on lead vocals, is driven by a thumping syncopated beat, which—in common with the title track—joins the bass in burying the group's high harmonies. Barry's melodic love ballad "Happy Ever After" features an unusual structure, multi-part melody, understated guitar work, and vocals that soar above its "hypnotic interplay of synthesizer rhythm, bass and percussion". The funky, energetic dance song "Party with No Name" features heavy bass, and has been compared to "Jive Talkin'" (1975).

Another of the album's art rock songs, the slinky "Ghost Train" finds the Gibbs exploring unusual lyrical territory. Stanley deems it a "wild grab bag" that defines the album, noting the "nervous energy" of its intro and the chorus' mix of Barry's fast phrasing, Robin's upper register vocals and the group's combined harmonies. He also highlights its especially complicated structure, and the psychedelic outro featuring "sound effects of a children's playground, a military drum loop and then an abrupt end with a door slamming and Barry defiantly shouting, 'Right!'." "Dimensions" is an R&B-style diversion with heavy drums, while "The Only Love" is a standard Bee Gees ballad, one which Stanley argues to foreshadow the boy band Westlife. Considered a strong example of the group's harmonic sense, "Human Sacrifice" is a funk song influenced by hip hop, with cryptic lyrics that possibly hint at a sexual encounter, and vocals that are buried in the mix beneath its danceable rhythm track. "True Confessions" features high-pitched parts, while "Evolution" features an unusual minor-key chorus.

== Release and promotion ==
High Civilization was released on 25 March 1991 in the UK, becoming the Bee Gees' third album for Warner Bros. Records, who expected it to achieve the same success as E.S.P. and One. Lars Toft, the European marketing manager for Warner Bros., noted that, as High Civilization was a priority release for the label, they spent a large budget on promotion in a manner important not only to Warner but for the group themselves, adding: "They always want to come back again and show their abilities." The promotional campaign was targeted largely at Germany, the biggest European market for the group. Accordingly, a radio advertisement was scheduled for nationwide rotation throughout April, and was also run in Holland and Austria; additionally, the group were scheduled for an appearance on the German television show Wetten, dass..?, and the magazine Stern issued a pullout advertorial. Commenting on the group's new direction, Toft commented: "The Bee Gees are always good at being contemporary. They update their sound at the right time. But it is still very Bee Gees."

The album spent five weeks on the UK Albums Chart, peaking at number 24. It also reached number two in Germany, number four in Austria, number six in Switzerland and number 21 in the Netherlands. The lead single, "Secret Love", was released in February, reaching number five on the UK Singles Chart and number two in Germany and Austria; additionally, it was met with success in the Netherlands, Denmark and on the Coca-Cola Eurochart Hot 100, where it entered at number 89. Released in May, the second single "When He's Gone" was unsuccessful on the charts, despite its sleeve featuring what biographers Melinda Bileyu, Hector Cook and Andrew Môn Hughes describe as "a great picture of Maurice with his hands crossed over his face". The third single, "The Only Love", featured a sleeve depicting Maurice's daughter Samantha; released in August only in certain regions, it was similarly unsuccessful, although Barry's fondness for it led to him performing it solo on the accompanying European tour, in a spot typically reserved for "Words".

In the US, High Civilization was released on 14 May 1991. Unlike its predecessors, it did not chart there. In their review of the album, The Courier-Post believed its only commercial hopes in the country would be if adult contemporary radio stations "picked up on the smooth melodies" of "Secret Love" and "Happy Ever After". On 2 May, the Bee Gees performed "When He's Gone" and "To Love Somebody" on Arsenio Hall's late night talk show, followed by an appearance on Into the Night with Rick Dees the following evening, performing "When He's Gone" and "One" and agreeing to be interviewed. This marked the album's only promotion in the US, although a special on the band's career was broadcast later in 1991 on Disney Channel.

=== High Civilization Tour ===
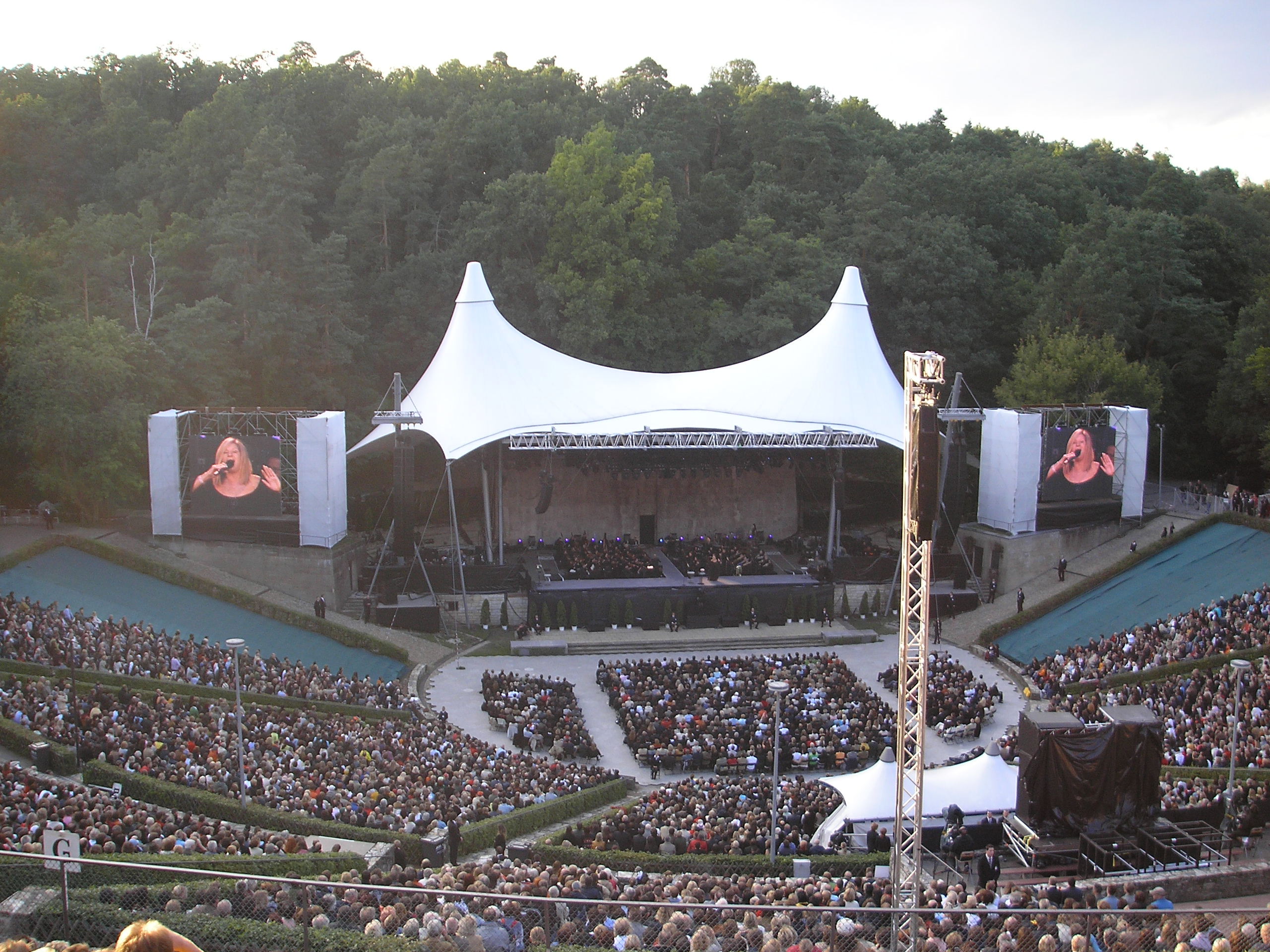
The Waldbühne, Berlin (pictured 2007), where the Bee Gees recorded three shows in 1991

A European tour in promotion of High Civilization ran from May–July 1991 and spanned 23 cities. A large part of the tour was scheduled for Germany, alongside gigs in Britain, Austria, France, Italy, the Netherlands Spain and Switzerland. The tour began on 25 May at Ostseehalle in Kiel, Germany, a venue previously played by the Rolling Stones and Queen. On this opening night, "Wish You Were Here" was played by the group in tribute to their late brother Andy, but it was dropped from the setlist thereafter. Elsewhere on the tour, "Words" received a five-minute standing ovation in Frankfurt, while during the first of five open-air concerts in Saarbrücken, a power cut disrupted Robin's performance of "Juliet", although the crowd finished the song for him.

Three shows at Berlin's Waldbühne venue were filmed for an hour-long TV special and limited edition VHS release; notably, Barry wore different fingerless cycling gloves at each concert to protect his arthritic fingers. Moving the tour beyond Germany, concerts in Milan, Lyon, La Coruna and Montpellier were cancelled. A show in Brussels was also to be cancelled over poor ticket sales, although a fan club representative, Ann Grootjans, intervened; believing the absence of "When He's Gone" from record shops was evidence of the Bee Gees falling victim to negligence from Warner Bros., rather than proof of a lack of genuine popularity, she and other fan club members posted signs promoting the show across Brussels, Flanders and Liege, and the show sold out within days.

The tour was scheduled to end with English shows at the National Exhibition Centre in Birmingham on 6 July, and at London's Wembley Arena the following evening; the latter was broadcast live on BBC Radio 1. In contrast to their 1989 show at the arena, the Bee Gees now performed "Night Fever" and "Stayin' Alive" in full, with "no apologies, no embarrassment"; Stanley comments: "The balance between past, present and future more closely aligned." To ease demand for further shows, the Bee Gees played an additional date in Birmingham, finishing the tour, and the brothers went on a break, during which, Barry then made a cameo appearance in the Only Fools and Horses special "Miami Twice".

== Critical reception ==
Professional ratings
Review scores
| Source | Rating |
|---|---|
| AllMusic | 2/5 stars |
| Anderson Independent-Mail | 2.5/4 stars |
| Calgary Herald | C− |
| Chicago Tribune | 2/4 stars |
| The Encyclopedia of Popular Music | 2/5 stars |
| The Great Rock Discography | 3/10 |
| NME | 6/10 |
| The Philadelphia Inquirer | 3/4 stars |
| The Record | 2.5/4 stars |
| The Rolling Stone Album Guide | 2/5 stars |

Deborah Wilker, reviewing High Civilization for the South Florida Sun Sentinel, called it a diverse, pleasant album which should both encourage positive perceptions of the Bee Gees and "find an audience with loyal fans". NME reviewer David Quantick believed it to be a "fine" record that, while not "too thrilling" for fans of the Farm, was "still about eight trillion times less dull than Phil Collins. Which is fine by me." Greg Kot of the Anderson Independent-Mail wrote that the group "show a little muscle" on High Civilization, enough to "keep them from oblivion" if not enough for a "triumphant return". The Philadelphia Inquirer reviewer William R. Macklin considered it further proof, after E.S.P. and One, that the Bee Gees were perhaps making "the best music of their careers", deeming it a "worthy" work that occasionally "stumbles on its own covert ambitions". He believed that, because of the album's numerous melodic quirks—including the minor-key chorus on "Evolution"—its songs "play like shorts at an art theater".

Harry Fisher, for The Morning Call, believed the album to be "good, even if it could have been better", writing that despite their age, the group "still sound inspired" and continue to "combine eloquent, three-part harmonies with solid songwriting". However, he criticised how the vocals are "mixed into oblivion" beneath the electronics and effects, which get "old real quick". Similarly, Barbara Jaegar of The Record considered it a worthy follow-up to E.S.P. and One that nonetheless "sometimes crashes under the weight of its own ambitions", praising the "meticulously arranged" love songs but panning the art-rock songs, saying: "Downplaying their voices in favour of heavy electronic instrumentation and studio gimmicks, the sound is sterile and unappealing." The Indianapolis Star reviewer Lynn Dean Ford believed that the Bee Gees were aiming for a new audience of MTV and VH-1 viewers. She commented that their "falsettos, harmonies and victim-of-love themes" remained, but not the "tender emotion" typical of their work, as it "drowns in the cold synths and harsh drum machines that further stunt this album's already questionable potential."

While noting the group's efforts to sound less like themselves, David Bauder of the Miami Herald believed their self-production meant there was no one present to curtail their bad ideas. He criticised its similarities to Yes, calling the title track "the worst of art rock", and described the album's music as having "a sterile, antiseptic feel of musicians who spend too much time with machines. If someone pulled the plug on their computers, all these songs would shrivel into nothing." For The Boston Globe, Carlo Wolff called it a "superbly crafted" album with "inhumanly perfect playing and singing and meticulous production". However, he believed the album ultimately fails as it "[stretches] virtuosity too far and the tunes, no matter how well-made, don't contextualise each other."

Mark Caro of the Chicago Tribune criticised the "bland Euro-disco" production and "crafted-rather-than-felt" lyrics, but believed its biggest problem was the lengthiness of the songs. Reviewing it for Melody Maker, the Stud Brothers criticised the music for plodding and the "helium delirium" for sounding "tired and out of breath". In the Dayton Daily News, Larsen believed young audiences would be put off by the group's high-pitched singing, writing that "High Civilization makes it painfully clear that you can't keep a bad sound down." In a retrospective review for AllMusic, William Ruhlmann called it a "misstep" on which the Bee Gees attempted to "go really contemporary" and sound like Prince, adding: "The techno-rock sounds silly with those near-Chipmunks harmonies, and it's all overdone. You can't really blame a band that has had recurring success by faithfully following contemporary pop trends for trying it, but you can blame them for failing."

== Legacy ==
High Civilization marked the end of the Bee Gees' commitments to Warner Bros. Records, whom the group believed underpromoted the record. In 1997, Timothy White of Billboard commented that although it was the Bee Gees' "most unremarked album" in the US, its "resourceful production sowed the seeds of both the jungle and drum'n'bass techniques only now entering the pop mainstream." Earlier, the magazine had praised the album's "trademark harmonies and lite-R&B stylings". UDiscoverMusic's Paul Sexton commented on how the Bee Gees applied their signature harmonies to "a more modern dance feel", aided by the heavy drums and "electronic effects." Hughes also commented that both High Civilization and its follow-up Size Isn't Everything (1993) "explored a myriad of different sounds compared to their predecessors", and were successful in the UK and Europe but overlooked in North America.

Among biographers of the group, David N. Meyer described High Civilization as, "by any reasonable standard, terrible." Stanley believes that the record is "something like an over-egged cocktail" next to the "nightcap" of One, drawing attention to its heavy production. He noted that the 'hair metal' style of Kendall's guitar work was about to lose popularity as grunge rose to commercial prominence, adding that the musician's "coiffed guitar workouts" diminished the impact of the album's contemporary drum programming. He also believed that the album was overlong—with only two songs shorter than five minutes—and while praising other songs and admiring the Gibbs' adventurousness, he conceded that "High Civilization was a tough listen." He notes that, for Size Isn't Everything, the Gibbs pursued a softer, less overbearing sound than the "overthought techno apocalypse" of High Civilization.

== Track listing ==
All tracks are written by Barry, Robin and Maurice Gibb.

| No. | Title | Lead vocal(s) | Length |
|---|---|---|---|
| 1. | "High Civilization" | Robin and Barry | 5:27 |
| 2. | "Secret Love" | Barry and Robin | 3:36 |
| 3. | "When He's Gone" | Robin and Barry | 5:53 |
| 4. | "Happy Ever After" | Barry | 6:15 |
| 5. | "Party With No Name" | Barry | 4:50 |
| 6. | "Ghost Train" | Barry and Robin | 6:02 |
| 7. | "Dimensions" | Maurice | 5:25 |
| 8. | "The Only Love" | Barry | 5:32 |
| 9. | "Human Sacrifice" | Barry | 5:37 |
| 10. | "True Confessions" | Barry | 5:14 |
| 11. | "Evolution" | Barry | 5:36 |

== Personnel ==
Adapted from the liner notes of High Civilization

Bee Gees

- Barry Gibb – vocals, guitars
- Robin Gibb – vocals
- Maurice Gibb – keyboards, guitars, vocals, lead vocals (7)

Additional personnel

- Tim Moore – keyboards, programming
- Alan Kendall – guitars
- George "Chocolate" Perry – bass guitar
- Scott F. Crago – drums (3, 8) (uncredited)
- Lenny Castro – percussion
- Julia Waters – backing vocals
- Maxine Waters – backing vocals

=== Production ===
- Bee Gees – producers, mixing
- Femi Jiya – engineer, mixing
- John Merchant – assistant engineer
- Howie Weinberg – mastering at Masterdisk (New York, NY)
- Jeff Lancaster – art direction, design, illustration
- Lou Beach – illustration
- Dick Bouchard – illustration
- Diego Uchitel – photography
- Gary Borman – management

== Charts and certifications ==
=== Weekly charts ===
| Chart (1991) | Peak position |
|---|---|
| Australian Albums (ARIA) | 126 |
| Austrian Albums (Ö3 Austria) | 4 |
| Dutch Albums (Album Top 100) | 21 |
| European Albums (Music & Media) | 9 |
| German Albums (Offizielle Top 100) | 2 |
| Hungarian Albums (MAHASZ) | 15 |
| Swedish Albums (Sverigetopplistan) | 50 |
| Swiss Albums (Schweizer Hitparade) | 6 |
| UK Albums (Official Charts) | 24 |

=== Year-end charts ===
| Chart (1991) | Position |
|---|---|
| Austrian Albums (Ö3 Austria) | 18 |
| German Albums (Offizielle Top 100) | 18 |
| Swiss Albums (Schweizer Hitparade) | 17 |

=== Certifications ===
| Region | Certification | Certified units/sales |
|---|---|---|
| Austria (IFPI Austria) | Gold | 25,000^{*} |
| Germany (BVMI) | Platinum | 500,000^{^} |
| Switzerland (IFPI Switzerland) | Platinum | 50,000^{^} |
^{*} Sales figures based on certification alone.^{^} Shipments figures based on certification alone.
