= One for All World Tour =

1989 concert tour by the Bee Gees

- Tour by Bee Gees
- Tour program cover
- Associated album: One
- Start date: April 10, 1989
- End date: December 7, 1989
- Legs: 5
- No. of shows: 55

Bee Gees concert chronology
- Spirits Having Flown Tour (1979); One for All World Tour (1989); High Civilization World Tour (1991)

One for All World Tour was the ninth concert tour by the Bee Gees in support of their eighteenth studio album One. The tour began on 10 April 1989 in Tokyo, Japan and ended on 7 December 1989 in Matsuyama, Japan.

== Background ==
In early 1988, the Bee Gees began recording One as their studio album after E.S.P. They stopped recording due to the death of their younger brother Andy Gibb on 10 March 1988. They continued recording in Mayfair Studios from November to December 1988 and February to March 1989. Just after they released their album, the brothers began touring in Japan, Europe, North America, Oceania and back to Japan. The full concert at the National Tennis Centre in Melbourne, Australia in November 1989 was released as a concert video entitled One for All Tour on 10 April 1991. During the DVD era, it was re-released as The Very Best of The Bee Gees Live! in 1997.

== Set List ==
1. "Ordinary Lives"
2. "Giving up the Ghost"
3. "To Love Somebody"
4. "I've Gotta Get a Message to You"
5. "One"
6. "Tokyo Nights"
7. "Words"
8. "Juliet"
9. First Medley: "New York Mining Disaster 1941", "Holiday", "Too Much Heaven"
10. Second Medley: "Heartbreaker", "Islands in the Stream"
11. Third Medley: "Run to Me", "Melody Fair" (Only performed in Yokohama), "World"
12. "Spicks and Specks" (Only performed in Oceania)
13. "Lonely Days"
14. "How Deep Is Your Love"
15. "It's My Neighborhood"
16. "How Can You Mend a Broken Heart"
17. "House of Shame"
18. "I Started a Joke"
19. "Massachusetts"
20. "Stayin' Alive"
21. "Nights on Broadway"
22. "Jive Talkin'"
23. "You Win Again"
24. "You Should Be Dancing"

== Tour dates ==
Date	City	Country	Venue
April 10, 1989	Tokyo	Japan	Budokan Theatre
May 3, 1989	Dortmund	West Germany	Westfallenhalle
May 5, 1989	Rotterdam	Netherlands	Sportpaleis Ahoy
May 7, 1989	Rotterdam	Netherlands	Sportpaleis Ahoy
May 9, 1989	Copenhagen	Denmark	Valby-Hallen
May 11, 1989	Nuremberg	West Germany	Frankenhalle
May 13, 1989	Nuremberg	West Germany	Frankenhalle
May 16, 1989	Frankfurt	West Germany	Festhalle Frankfurt
May 17, 1989	Frankfurt	West Germany	Festhalle Frankfurt
May 19, 1989	Zürich	Switzerland	Hallenstadion
May 20, 1989	Zürich	Switzerland	Hallenstadion
May 21, 1989	Vienna	Austria	Wiener Stadthalle
May 22, 1989	Munich	West Germany	Olympiahalle
May 24, 1989	Mannheim	West Germany	Isstadion
May 25, 1989	Mannheim	West Germany	Isstadion
May 27, 1989	West Berlin	West Germany	Waldbühne
May 28, 1989	West Berlin	West Germany	Waldbühne
June 1, 1989	London	England	Wembley Arena
June 2, 1989	London	England	Wembley Arena
June 3, 1989	West Berlin	West Germany	Waldbühne
June 8, 1989	Paris	France	Palais Omnisports de Paris-Bercy
June 10, 1989	Brussels	Belgium	Cinquantenaire
June 15, 1989	London	England	Wembley Arena
June 17, 1989	Edinburgh	Scotland	Playhouse Theatre
June 22 1989	Birmingham	England	National Exhibition Centre
June 26, 1989	Rotterdam	Netherlands	Sportpaleis Ahoy
June 28, 1989	West Berlin	West Germany	Waldbühne
June 30, 1989	St. Goarshausen	West Germany	Freilichtbühne Loreley
July 1, 1989	Hanover	West Germany	Niedersachsenstadion
July 15, 1989	London	England	Wembley Arena
July 29, 1989	Saint Paul	United States	Harriet Island Pavilion
July 31, 1989	Chicago	United States	Poplar Creek Music Theater
August 1, 1989	Clarkston	United States	Pine Knob Music Theatre
August 3, 1989	Columbia	United States	Merriweather Post Pavilion
August 4, 1989	Philadelphia	United States	Mann Music Center
August 6, 1989	Holmdel Township	United States	Garden State Arts Center
August 9, 1989	New York City	United States	Radio City Music Hall
August 10, 1989	New York City	United States	Radio City Music Hall
August 12, 1989	Mansfield	United States	Great Woods Center for the Performing Arts
August 13, 1989	Saratoga Springs	United States	Saratoga Performing Arts Center
August 15, 1989	Montreal	Canada	Montreal Forum
August 16, 1989	Toronto	Canada	CNE Grandstand
August 19, 1989	Wantagh	United States	Jones Beach Marine Theater
August 21, 1989	Cuyahoga Falls	United States	Blossom Music Center
August 23, 1989	Atlanta	United States	Lakewood Amphitheatre
August 26, 1989	Las Vegas	United States	Aladdin Theatre for the Performing Arts
August 30, 1989	Los Angeles	United States	Universal Amphitheatre
August 31, 1989	Los Angeles	United States	Universal Amphitheatre
September 2, 1989	Mountain View	United States	Shoreline Amphitheatre
November 7, 1989	Canberra	Australia	National Indoor Sports Centre
November 9, 1989	Adelaide	Australia	Apollo Entertainment Centre
November 17, 1989	Melbourne	Australia	National Tennis Centre at Flinders Park
November 18, 1989	Melbourne	Australia	National Tennis Centre at Flinders Park
November 28, 1989	Yokohama	Japan	Yokohama Arena
December 7, 1989	Matsuyama	Japan	Kenmin Bunka Kaikan

== Personnel ==
- Barry Gibb – vocals, guitar
- Robin Gibb – vocals
- Maurice Gibb – vocals, keyboards, bass, guitar
- Alan Kendall – lead guitar
- Tim Cansfield – guitar
- Russ Powell - guitar
- Vic Martin – keyboards, synthesizer
- Gary Moberly – keyboards, synthesizer
- George Perry – bass
- Chester Thompson – drums (until St. Paul, Minnesota)
- Mike Murphy – drums (from Minnesota onwards)
- Tampa Lann, Linda Harmon, and Phyllis St. James – background vocals, percussions
