= Mike Murphy (musician) =

American musician(1946–2006)

Michael James Murphy
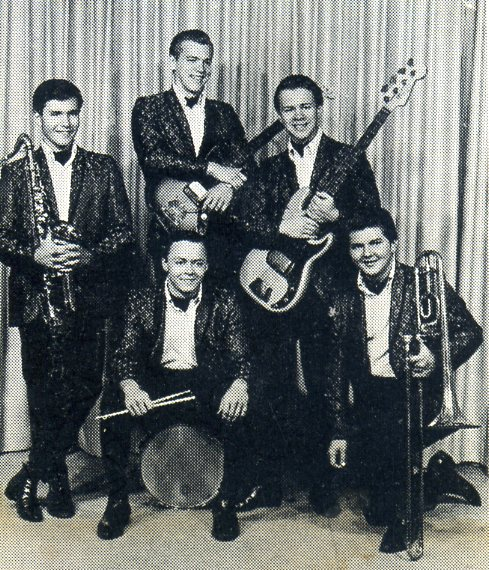
- The Ambassadors

Background information
- Born: Michael J. Murphy; February 5, 1946
- Origin: Aurora, Illinois, U.S.
- Died: April 11, 2006 (age 60) Cleveland, Ohio, U.S.
- Genres: Rock
- Occupations: Musician, instructor, mixing engineer
- Instrument: Drums

Mike Murphy (1946—2006) was an American professional musician. He worked with the bands Chicago, Yanni and Manhattan Transfer as well as the Bee Gees. While in the Navy, He married Pam Hansen whom he went on to share 3 children with, Shannon Murphy (children Nathan Murphy, Kyle, Brittany, Brando, Colin (deceased 2025) & Mark Jackson), Ryan Murphy & Erin Murphy (deceased, 1991). After the divorce of his first wife, he would later be remarried to fellow musician and Bee Gees background vocalist, Tampa Lann. They moved to Ohio in 1993, building a sprawling lakeside mansion full of various plaques and awards on a private stretch of land spanning 12 acres. The couple was very active members of their church, where Tampa has remained a prominent voice. Mike Murphy would later pass away from a Lung Disease.

== Early life ==
Michael James Murphy was born 5 February 1946 in Aurora, Illinois, the son of James Owen Murphy and Mary Donna Gilman. His father was a musician and his mother was a singer and dancer with the Red Stocking Review. He began making music as a youngster with his father's band (The Jimmy Murphy Band). During high school he was a drummer in the Vaqueros Drum and Bugle Corps. The Vaqueros disbanded in 1963 but he was a major influence in their drum section. He was in the band at East Aurora High School and was a quarterback on their football team, graduating in 1964. He was the drummer with The Ambassadors. After a year at Doan College in Nebraska, he joined the U.S. Navy and served as an instructor in the Navy School of Music. He returned to Aurora in the early 1970s, married, had three children, divorced, was an instructor at the Fox Valley Raiders Drum And Bugle Corps and was on their board of directors.

== Career ==
He was a professional musician in both Chicago and Los Angeles as a studio drummer, jingle producer, educator, live performer, and manufacturer, serving as Operations Director for DW drums. He toured five years with the Grammy Award-winning band Chicago as a drum and computer technician, bridging the gap into digital technology, developing protocol for use of sequencing in live performance; executing the same for Yanni and Manhattan Transfer.

=== Bee Gees ===
In 1989, Murphy was the drummer for the Bee Gees in their concerts in Australia, supporting their 1989 One for All World Tour promoting their album One. They performed on four continents for a total of twenty-five concerts (eleven in Europe, six in Australia, two in Japan, and six in the U.S. He also performed with them on their four-CD box set, Tales from the Brothers Gibb. He appears on the "One for All Tour concert film". He later married one of the backing vocalists/percussionists from the Bee Gees' One For All tour, Tampa Lann. He continued to live in California for many years.

Murphy also recorded additional drums with the Bee Gees on their 1992 American hit single "When He's Gone" wherein future Eagles backup drummer and percussionist Scott Crago played the mainline drums. Trevor Murrell became the Bee Gees' drummer in 1992.

== Later life and death ==
Murphy moved to Cleveland, Ohio in 1994, to support his wife as caregiver for her mother. He became a custom integrator of audio, video, lighting, and security systems. He died from a lung complication, interstitial pheneumonia, on April 11, 2006. He was buried at Knollwood Cemetery in Mayfield Heights, Ohio, on April 18, 2006.
