= Scott F. Crago =

American drummer

Scott Crago
- Born: Scott Francis Crago; July 26, 1963 (age 63); Washington, D.C., U.S.
- Genres: Blues-rock, country music
- Occupations: Session drummer, songwriter, producer
- Instruments: Drums, percussion

Scott Francis Crago (born July 26, 1963) is an American session drummer, songwriter, and producer. He has worked with the Eagles as their backup and touring drummer since 1994.

Other artists he has played with include Venice, Sheryl Crow, Bonnie Raitt, Bryan Adams, Stevie Nicks, Jackson Browne, Paul Simon, Bee Gees, Stevie Wonder, Bob Seger and Chris Isaak.

== Early life ==
Crago has a twin brother, engineer Jeff Crago. Crago attended Berklee College of Music in Boston for two and a half years. He left for Los Angeles after his dorm room burnt down due to a disgruntled student setting fire to various places around the college.

== Career ==
Crago became the drummer for Venice in the 1980s. In 1991-1992, he played drums on two of Bee Gees' singles, "The Only Love" and "When He's Gone" from the album High Civilization. He also played for the Bee Gees on the Size Isn't Everything album; the song "Paying the Price of Love" features his drumming as well as four other tracks.

=== Eagles ===
In 1994, the Eagles began a reunion with the "Long Run" lineup. They began auditioning for touring band members and Eagles drummer Don Henley oversaw backup drummer auditions wherein there were ten men on a list. In an interview with Vic Firth, Crago said he was the tenth man, but the first one Henley auditioned.

As the band rehearsed, during "New York Minute", after six bars into the song, Henley stopped the players with a wave of his hand, turned around to Crago and advised him to take a break and listen to the song again. An interview for Modern Drummer stated that Crago recalled of "turning white, almost contracted immediate stomachache with symptoms of vomiting and diarrhea". When the rehearsal ended, he thought that "even if they've got me here for a reason, I must have blown that song". Taking Henley's advice, he listened to the song six hundred times that night to ensure that the mistake never happens again.

== Equipment ==
Crago and Jeff Obermeyer invented a drum muffling device. Drum Workshop manufactures the device, the DW Pro-Cushion, for drummers to place inside their bass drums for a dampened sound.

== Other duties ==
Aside from drumming, Crago is also a songwriter and producer. He has written many songs, one of which was Don Henley's single "Everything Is Different Now". The song is found on Henley's 2000 album Inside Job. Crago also co-wrote "That Made Me Stronger" off Stevie Nicks' 2001 album Trouble in Shangri-La.

He was, with Steuart Smith, in Henley's touring band in Henley's 2016 world tour.
