= One for All Tour =

Video by Bee Gees
- Released: 10 April 1991
- Recorded: November 1989
- Venue: National Tennis Centre, Melbourne, Australia
- Genre: Rock, pop, disco, funk, soul, R&B, acoustic
- Length: 102 min.
- Label: MPI Home Video; Eagle Vision
- Director: Adrian Woods, Peter Demetris
- Producer: Adrian Woods

Bee Gees chronology
The Bee Gees Special (1979)	One for All Tour (1991)	Keppel Road (1997)

One for All Tour is a concert video from The Bee Gees recorded live at the National Tennis Centre in Melbourne, Australia in November 1989. Melbourne was the third final stop on their 1989 One for All World Tour, which included the United States, Europe, and Asia the first time the Bee Gees played live there since their 1979 Spirits Having Flown Tour. Originally, this video was released in two volumes on VHS, each 50 minutes apiece. Volume One incorrectly listed the song "My World" from 1972 instead of the song "World" from 1967. In the DVD era, the cover was slightly changed and was released under the title The Very Best of The Bee Gees Live! in 1997.

In 2014, the Melbourne show was made available on CD for the first time as part of a box set chronicling their period on Warner Bros.

In 2018, Eagle Rock Entertainment re-released the concert on blu-ray and DVD in its original aspect ratio under the title One for All Tour: Live in Australia 1989. The audio was presented in a newly mixed and mastered surround sound.

== Track listings ==
1. "Ordinary Lives" Album: One
2. "Giving Up the Ghost" Album: ESP
3. "To Love Somebody" Album: Bee Gees' 1st
4. "I've Gotta Get a Message to You" Album: Idea
5. "One" Album: One
6. "Tokyo Nights" Album: One
7. "Words" Album: No Album/Best of Bee Gees (Words - Single)
8. "Juliet" (Robin Gibb) Album: How Old Are You?
9. "New York Mining Disaster 1941" Album: Bee Gees' 1st
10. "Holiday" Album: Bee Gees' 1st
11. "Too Much Heaven" Album: Spirits Having Flown
12. "Heartbreaker" (Dionne Warwick) Album: Heartbreaker
13. "Islands in the Stream" (Kenny Rogers) Album: Eyes That See in the Dark
14. "Run to Me" Album: To Whom It May Concern
15. "World" Album: Horizontal
16. "Spicks and Specks" Album: Spicks and Specks
17. "Lonely Days" Album: 2 Years On
18. "How Deep Is Your Love" Album: Saturday Night Fever
19. "It's My Neighborhood" Album: One
20. "How Can You Mend a Broken Heart" Album: Trafalgar
21. "House of Shame" Album: One
22. "I Started a Joke" Album: Idea
23. "Massachusetts" Album: Horizontal
24. "Stayin' Alive" Album: Saturday Night Fever
25. "Nights on Broadway" Album: Main Course
26. "Jive Talkin'" Album: Main Course
27. "You Win Again" Album: ESP
28. "You Should Be Dancing" Album: Children of the World

== Personnel ==
- Barry Gibb - vocals, guitar
- Robin Gibb - vocals
- Maurice Gibb - vocals, keyboard, guitar
- Alan Kendall - lead guitar
- Tim Cansfield - guitar
- Vic Martin - keyboard, synthesizer
- Gary Moberly - keyboard, synthesizer
- George Perry - bass
- Mike Murphy - drums
- Tampa Lann, Linda Harmon, Phyllis St. James - Backup singers and percussionists
