= When He's Gone =

Single by Bee Gees

from the album High Civilization
- B-side: "Massachusetts (live)" (UK); "You Win Again (live)" (UK); "True Confessions" (US)
- Released: May 1991
- Recorded: 1990; Middle Ear, Miami Beach
- Genre: Pop rock
- Length: 5:59 (album); 4:06 (US single edit)
- Label: Warner Bros. Records, Warner Music
- Songwriters: Barry, Robin & Maurice Gibb
- Producers: Barry Gibb, Robin Gibb, Maurice Gibb

Bee Gees singles chronology
"Secret Love" (1991)	"When He's Gone" (1991)	"The Only Love" (1991)

"When He's Gone" is a song by the Bee Gees from their 1991 album High Civilization, released as the album's only single in North America. Due to lack of promotion from Warner Bros. to its parent album, the single failed to chart in America (although it briefly appeared on the Cashbox singles chart, peaking at number 86) but reached number 93 in Canada.

Two different B-sides were issued. In the United States, the song "True Confessions" was used, which was a song that was not included on the cassette versions of High Civilization. The B-sides in the UK were live performances of "Massachusetts" and "You Win Again" done in Melbourne, Australia from their 1989 One For All Tour.

== Live performances ==
The Bee Gees made two TV appearances in May 1991 to promote the single. They appeared on Rick Dees' show Into the Night where they sang "When He's Gone" and "One" and on The Arsenio Hall Show they sang "When He's Gone" and "To Love Somebody".

== Track listing ==
7-inch and CD single (Europe)

1. "When He's Gone" (Single edit) - 4:06
2. "Massachusetts" (live) - 3:16

7-inch and CD single (UK)

1. "When He's Gone" (Single edit) - 4:06
2. "Massachusetts" (live) - 3:16
3. "You Win Again" (live) - 3:25

7-inch and CD single (US)

1. "When He's Gone" (Single edit) - 4:06
2. "True Confessions" - 5:17

== Charts ==
Chart (1991)	Peak position
Canada Top Singles (RPM)	93
UK Airplay (Music Week)	25
US Cash Box Top 100	86

== Personnel ==
Bee Gees

- Robin Gibb – lead and backing vocals
- Barry Gibb – harmony and backing vocals, rhythm guitar
- Maurice Gibb – backing vocals, keyboards, synthesizer, rhythm guitar

Additional personnel

- Alan Kendall – guitar
- Tim Cansfield - guitar
- Tim Moore – keyboards, synthesizer, programmer
- George "Chocolate" Perry – bass guitar
- Lenny Castro – percussion
- Julia and Maxine Waters – backing vocals
