= Crazy for Your Love (Bee Gees song) =

Single by Bee Gees

from the album E.S.P.
- B-side: "You Win Again"
- Released: 8 February 1988
- Length: 4:40
- Label: Warner Bros.
- Songwriters: Barry Gibb; Robin Gibb; Maurice Gibb
- Producers: Arif Mardin; Bee Gees; Brian Tench

Bee Gees singles chronology
"E.S.P." (1987)	"Crazy for Your Love" (1988)	"Angela" (1988)

"Crazy for Your Love" is a song by pop music group Bee Gees, which was released in 1988 as the third single from their seventeenth studio album E.S.P. (1987). The song was written by Barry Gibb, Robin Gibb and Maurice Gibb, and produced by Arif Mardin and the Bee Gees, with co-production by Brian Tench. "Crazy for Your Love" peaked at No. 79 in the UK Singles Chart and remained in the Top 100 for two weeks.

== Critical reception ==
On its release, Eleanor Levy of Record Mirror wrote: "This is the Bee Gees back to their camp, screaming best (or, indeed, worst, depending on your point of view). Sharing the heavy-handed drum beat of "You Win Again" but little else, in the battle for the Club 18-30 dancefloor, the Bee Gees take no prisoners." In a review of E.S.P., Paul Grein of the Los Angeles Times described "Crazy for Your Love" as a "rollicking pop piece that suggests Kenny Loggins". Stephen Thomas Erlewine of AllMusic retrospectively picked "Crazy for Your Love" as one track on E.S.P that works as the band "attempt[ed] to add some street beats and mild hip-hop to their standard adult pop".

== Track listing ==
7" single

1. "Crazy for Your Love" - 4:40
2. "You Win Again" (5.14 Remix) - 5:14

12" single

1. "Crazy for Your Love" - 4:40
2. "You Win Again" (5.14 Remix) - 5:14
3. "Giving Up the Ghost" - 4:26

== Personnel ==
Crazy for Your Love

- Barry Gibb – lead vocals, backing vocals
- Maurice Gibb – additional keyboards, backing vocals
- Robin Gibb – backing vocals
- Greg Phillinganes – keyboards, bass sequencing
- Joe Mardin – bass sequencing, drum programming

Production

- Arif Mardin, Barry Gibb, Robin Gibb, Maurice Gibb – producers of "Crazy for Your Love" and "You Win Again"
- Brian Tench – co-producer on "Crazy for Your Love" and "You Win Again"
- Shep Pettibone – additional production and mixing on "You Win Again"
- Doc Dougherty – mix engineer on "You Win Again"
- Tuta Aquino – editing on "You Win Again"

Other

- T&CP Assoc. – design
- Pierre Terrasson – photography

== Charts ==
Chart (1988)	Peak position
UK Singles Chart	79
