= Ordinary Lives =

Single by Bee Gees

from the album One
- B-side: "Wing and a Prayer"
- Released: 27 March 1989
- Recorded: April 1988
- Genre: Pop
- Length: 4:01
- Label: Warner Bros.
- Songwriters: Barry, Robin & Maurice Gibb
- Producers: Barry Gibb, Robin Gibb, Maurice Gibb, Brian Tench

Bee Gees singles chronology
"E.S.P." (1987)	"Ordinary Lives" (1989)	"One" (1989)

"Ordinary Lives" is a song by the Bee Gees from their 16th studio album One, released on 27 March 1989 by Warner Records as the album's first single. It was written by the group and they produced it with Brian Tench. Following the premature death of their younger brother Andy Gibb in 1988, the Bee Gees dedicated this song and their new album to him. Originally the song was titled "Cruel World" but was later changed to "Ordinary Lives". The song reached the top 10 in Switzerland (number 9) and Germany (number 8), and hit the top 40 in some European countries except France and the UK, where it peaked at number 49 and 54 respectively.

== Composition and inspiration ==
Scott Glasel recalled that "Ordinary Lives" was started before Andy died, but as completed it seems to be a philosophical comment on life and death. For a time it was called "Cruel World", a phrase heard at the start of the second verse as complete. The rhythm has some similarity to "You Win Again" and may have been a deliberate attempt to follow it up, but it has many new features, including the brief spoken word parts and the existential musings of the lyrics, something often associated with Robin but clearly here coming from Barry. The finished recording probably has added dubs by the musicians who worked on the album One.

Barry Gibb performed this song in the 2013 Mythology Tour, accompanied by his son Stephen Gibb and Maurice's daughter Samantha "Sammy" Gibb. He still used the backing vocal effect from the last part of the original record.

== Music video ==
The music video for the song was filmed in Los Angeles, California and received heavy airplay from 1989 to 1990. It shows the Bee Gees and their backing band consisting of Alan Kendall (guitar), with guests Nathan East (bass), and Alex Acuña (drums) in a dark studio performing the song, intersped with scenes of everyday life and an archival footage of the 1929 Wall Street crash.

== Personnel ==
Bee Gees

- Barry Gibb – lead, harmony and backing vocals; rhythm guitar
- Robin Gibb – lead, harmony and backing vocals
- Maurice Gibb – harmony and backing vocals, keyboards (played bass on TV show performances of this song)

Additional musicians

- Peter-John Vettese – keyboards, synthesizer
- Tim Cansfield – lead guitar
- Alan Kendall – lead guitar
- Nathan East – bass
- Steve Ferrone – drums

== Charts ==
=== Weekly charts ===
Weekly chart performance for "Ordinary Lives"
Chart (1989)	Peak position
Austria (Ö3 Austria Top 40)	19
Belgium (Ultratop 50 Flanders)	22
Europe (Eurochart Hot 100)	25
France (SNEP)	49
Italy Airplay (Music & Media)	4
Netherlands (Dutch Top 40)	23
Netherlands (Single Top 100)	27
Switzerland (Schweizer Hitparade)	9
UK Singles (OCC)	54
West Germany (GfK)	8

=== Year-end charts ===
Year-end chart performance for "Ordinary Lives"
Chart (1989)	Position
West Germany (Media Control)	61
