= The Only Love =

Single by Bee Gees

from the album High Civilization
- Released: August 1991
- Recorded: 1990
- Genre: R&B, soft rock
- Length: 5:32
- Label: Warner Bros. Records, Warner Music
- Songwriter: Barry, Robin & Maurice Gibb
- Producer: Bee Gees

Bee Gees singles chronology
"When He's Gone" (1991)	"The Only Love" (1991)	"Happy Ever After" (1991)

"The Only Love" is a song by the Bee Gees from their 1991 album High Civilization, released as the album's third single. The single's B-side was a previously unreleased live version of "You Win Again", recorded in Melbourne, Australia during their 1989's One for All World Tour. Although the song was released only in Europe as a single there, it did not chart in the UK, but it reached number 31 in Germany. The sleeve art for the single was a photo collage that included an image of Maurice’s daughter Samantha right in the center. A ballad, lead vocals are provided by Barry Gibb.

"The Only Love" was only performed during the 1991 High Civilization Tour. It was covered by Ana Gazzola in Portuguese.

== Recording ==
"The Only Love" was originally offered by Barry to Kelli Wolfe, but he then replaced it with a song he wrote specifically for her, "Born to Be Loved by You".

The track sounds like an extended Barry verse welded to the type of big singalong chorus that Robin and Maurice always favored, its lyrics are well put and under the circumstances he seems entitled to the over-the-top repeats at the song's finish.

== Personnel ==
- Barry Gibb — lead vocal, guitar
- Robin Gibb — harmony vocal
- Maurice Gibb — keyboards, synthesizer, guitar
- Alan Kendall - guitar
- Tim Moore — keyboards, synthesizer, programming
- George "Chocolate" Perry — bass
- Lenny Castro — percussion

== Charts ==
Chart (1991)	Peak position
Austria (Ö3 Austria Top 40)	27
Europe (European Hot 100 Singles)	83
Germany (GfK)	31
UK Airplay (Music Week)	52
