= Fort Worth Convention Center =

Arena in Texas, United States

Coordinates: 32.749°N 97.3277°W

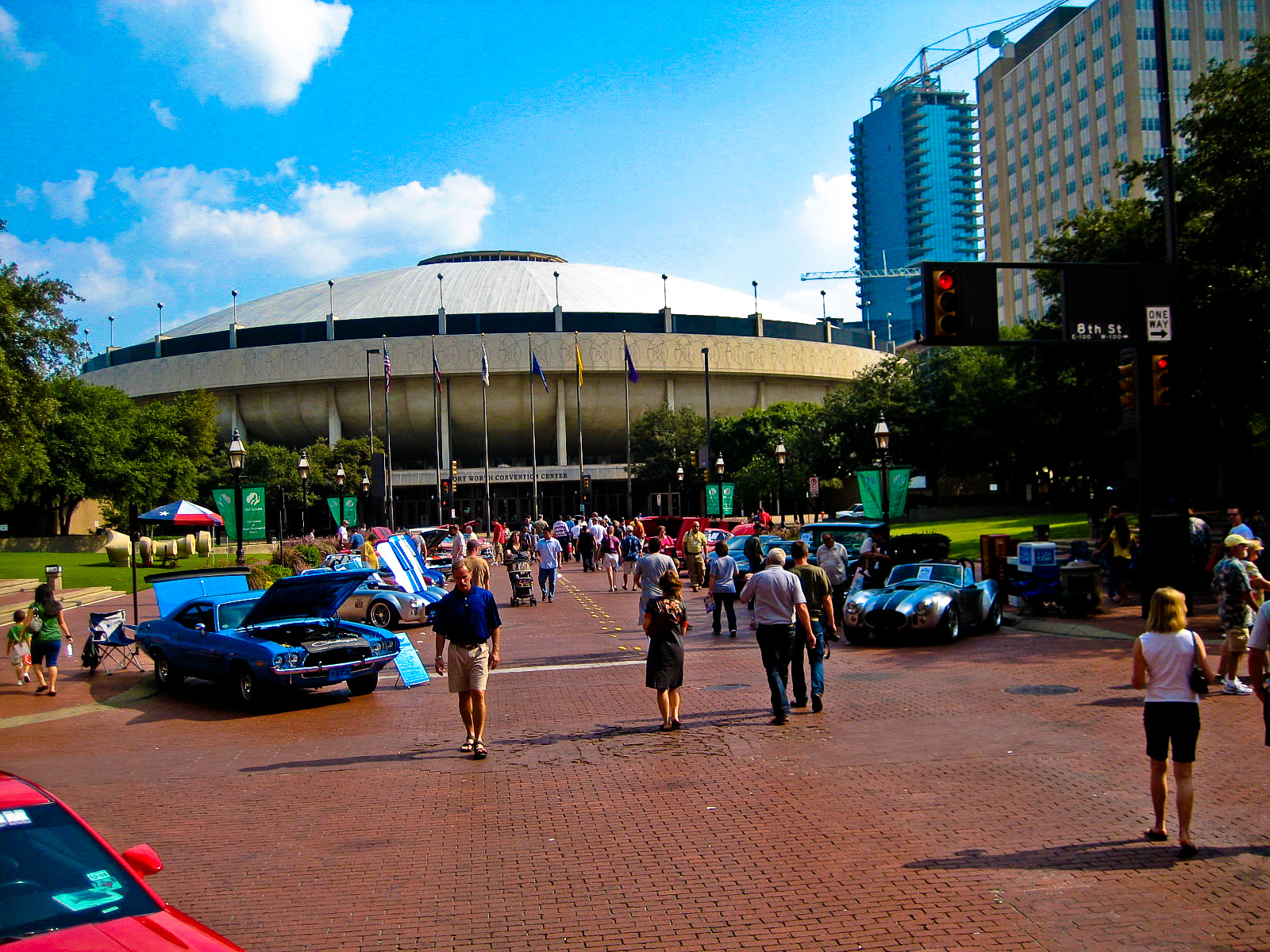
- Exterior of convention center, c.2008
- Interactive map of Fort Worth Convention Center
- Former names: Tarrant County Convention Center (1968-97)
- Address: 12 Houston St; Fort Worth, TX 76102-6432
- Location: Sundance Square, Downtown Fort Worth
- Owner: City of Fort Worth
- Operator: Fort Worth Convention & Visitors Bureau

Construction
- Opened: September 30, 1968
- Renovated: 1983, 2003
- Cost: $5.5 million ($53.1 million in 2025 dollars)
- Architect: Preston M. Geren Sr.

Website
- Official Website

The Fort Worth Convention Center (formerly known as the Tarrant County Convention Center) is a convention center and indoor arena located in downtown Fort Worth, Texas. The complex opened on September 30, 1968, and was expanded in 1983, 2002 and 2003.

== Background ==
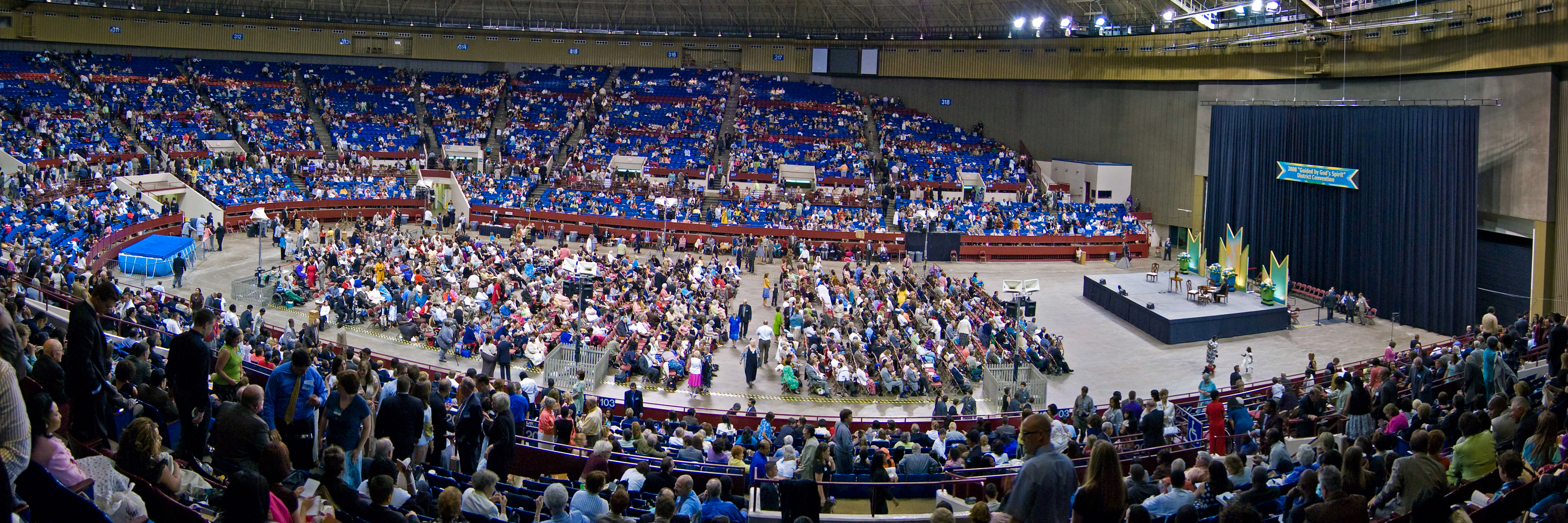
Interior of arena

The complex was proposed by county officials in 1961 as a competitor to the Dallas Convention Center and approved in 1967. Over 14 city blocks (previously known as "Hell's Half Acre") were demolished to make way for the new facility that opened in 1968. The building is noted for the indoor arena, resembling a flying saucer. In 1997 the City of Fort Worth purchased the facilities and properties, changing the complex's name to the Fort Worth Convention Center. In 2000 the JFK Theatre was demolished to make way for the Water Garden Events Plaza. In 2014 the city proposed to demolish the aging arena for an additional meeting space.

In January 2020, plans to demolish the Convention Center's arena were confirmed by the Fort Worth City Council. In addition to the arena's demolition, the plans also include straightening Commerce Street, building a 1,000 seat hotel and adding over 50,000 square feet of exhibit space, with groundbreaking intended for 2022 or 2023. The convention center held a farewell event for the arena in September 2026 ahead of its planned demolition in 2027.

== Notable events ==
Ike & Tina Turner performed at the Tarrant County Convention Center Arena on March 11, 1972.

Elvis Presley performed there on June 18, 1972. He returned for two dates on June 15 and 16, 1974, doing an afternoon and evening show on each day at the arena. He returned again on June 3 and July 3, 1976.

The concert movie Ladies and Gentlemen: The Rolling Stones was partially filmed during two June 24, 1972, shows (matinee and evening) at the arena during the Rolling Stones' 1972 Tour of America.

Bob Dylan's highly successful 1974 "comeback tour" featuring The Band played the facility on January 25, 1974. Dylan played two more shows there on May 16, 1976, and November 24, 1978.

On May 3, 1976, Paul McCartney and Wings opened the North American leg of the Wings Over the World tour at the arena.

On November 3, 1976, and again on July 7 and 8, 1977, Eagles performed three sold-out shows as part of their 1976-1978 Hotel California Tour at the arena.

On May 1, 1977, Pink Floyd played a show on the In the Flesh Tour at the arena which has surfaced on bootleg over the years.

February 27, 1977 was selected as the first date of the Led Zeppelin North American Tour 1977 at the arena, but that tour was delayed in starting. The rescheduled Fort Worth date was May 22, 1977.

July 28, 1978, Bob Marley and The Wailers played at the convention center as part of their Kaya Tour.

On June 28, 1979, The Bee Gees kicked off their Spirits Having Flown Tour which was filmed for The Bee Gees Special that aired later in the year on NBC.

On November 23 and 24, 1987, U2 performed two sold-out shows as part of their Joshua Tree tour. Parts of the second show were filmed and appeared in the feature film "Rattle and Hum", a documentary of the tour. The song "When Love Comes to Town" featuring B.B. King was prominent in the film.

The Metallica concert video Cunning Stunts was recorded at the Fort Worth Convention Center on May 9–10, 1997, toward the end of the Poor Touring Me tour.

On February 26, 2016, then-presidential candidate Donald Trump held a rally for his campaign at the convention center.

On September 15 & 16, 2018, the South Korean group BTS held two concerts as part of their Love Yourself Tour.

On May 8, 2019, the South Korean group Blackpink held a concert as part of their In Your Area World Tour.

== Sports ==
- Texas Chaparrals (ABA) (1970–1971)
- Fort Worth Fire (CHL) (1992–1999)
- Fort Worth Brahmas (WPHL/CHL) (1997–2006)
- Fort Worth Cavalry (AFL) (1994)
- Fort Worth Flyers (NBA D-League) (2005–2007)
- North Texas Bulls (AAL/AFA) (2021–2022)

For a time in 1970–71, it hosted home games for the Texas Chaparrals of the American Basketball Association. During the 1990s, the building was home to the Fort Worth Fire and Fort Worth Brahmas ice hockey teams, as well as the Arena Football League's Fort Worth Cavalry. From 2005 to 2007, it was home to the Fort Worth Flyers of the NBA Development League. In 2020, it hosted the home games for the North Texas Bulls out of the American Arena League.

The arena also hosted the 1992 Davis Cup final, which saw the United States defeat Switzerland.

The 2018 National Association of Intercollegiate Gymnastics Clubs (NAIGC) held their 30th annual National Championships at the convention center.

Preceded by Palais des Sports de Gerland; Lyon	Davis Cup; Final Venue; 1992	Succeeded by Exhibition Hall; Düsseldorf
