= For Whom the Bell Tolls (Bee Gees song) =

1993 single by Bee Gees

Single by Bee Gees

from the album Size Isn't Everything
- B-side: "Decadance"
- Released: 15 November 1993
- Length: 5:06 (album version); 3:56 (single edit)
- Label: Polydor
- Songwriters: Barry Gibb; Robin Gibb; Maurice Gibb
- Producer: Bee Gees

Bee Gees singles chronology
"Paying the Price of Love" (1993)	"For Whom the Bell Tolls" (1993)	"How to Fall in Love, Part 1" (1994)

Music video
- "For Whom the Bell Tolls" on YouTube

"For Whom the Bell Tolls" is a song by the Bee Gees, released on 15 November 1993 by Polydor Records as the second single from their 20th studio album, Size Isn't Everything (1993). It was both written and produced by the brothers, peaking at number four on the UK Singles Chart and number six in Ireland. This song would be the band's highest-charting single in the UK during the 1990s, giving them a UK top-five single in four consecutive decades: the 1960s, 1970s, 1980s, and 1990s. A music video, filmed in New York, was also released for this song.

== Critical reception ==
Larry Flick from Billboard magazine was very positive in his review of the song, writing, "This brilliant single from the Gibb brothers' Size Isn't Everything album is arguably the finest tune they've written and recorded in 15 years, a no-nonsense romantic ballad that parts the darkest clouds and lets the blue burst through. Top 40 hasn't had a single this poetic uplifting in ages, and album rock formats should seize on the original five minute version, which features an acoustic guitar-framed arrangement that rivals Soul Asylum. Better than a comeback, the Bee Gees have simply got the best new song on the airwaves." Alan Jones from Music Week gave the song three out of five, complimenting it as a "pleasant ballad".

== Commercial performance ==
"For Whom the Bell Tolls" made its debut on the UK Singles Chart at number 38 on 27 November. The song continued to climb the chart, entering the top 10 on 11 December. The song reached a peak of number 4 on Christmas Day 1993, where it remained for two consecutive weeks. "For Whom the Bell Tolls" spent six weeks within the UK top 10 and 14 weeks in the top 100. In terms of its length of stay on the chart and its peak position, "For Whom the Bell Tolls" was the bands most successful single since their 1987 number one "You Win Again".

== Track listings ==
- UK CD1 and 12-inch single
1. "For Whom the Bell Tolls" – 3:55
2. "Decadance" (classic house mix) – 9:30
3. "Decadance" (club mix) – 5:50
4. "Decadance" (vocal mix) – 5:43
- UK CD2 and cassette single; Australasian CD single
1. "For Whom the Bell Tolls"
2. "Stayin' Alive"
3. "Too Much Heaven"
4. "Massachusetts"
- European CD single and Japanese mini-CD single
1. "For Whom the Bell Tolls"
2. "Decadance" (club mix)
- US CD and cassette single
1. "For Whom the Bell Tolls" – 5:06
2. "New York Mining Disaster 1941" – 2:08
3. "I've Gotta Get a Message to You" – 3:06
4. "Massachusetts (Lights Went Out)" – 2:22

== Charts ==
=== Weekly charts ===
Chart (1993–1994)	Peak position
Belgium (Ultratop 50 Flanders)	13
Canada Top Singles (RPM)	30
Canada Adult Contemporary (RPM)	15
Europe (Eurochart Hot 100)	10
Europe (European Hit Radio)	11
Germany (GfK)	52
Iceland (Íslenski Listinn Topp 40)	40
Ireland (IRMA)	6
Netherlands (Dutch Top 40)	34
Netherlands (Single Top 100)	20
UK Singles (Official Charts)	4
UK Airplay (Music Week)	10
US Bubbling Under Hot 100 (Billboard)	9
US Adult Contemporary (Billboard)	29

=== Year-end charts ===
Chart (1993)	Position
UK Singles (OCC)	33

Chart (1994)	Position
Brazil (Mais Tocadas)	58
UK Singles (OCC)	140

== Certifications ==
Region	Certification	Certified units/sales
United Kingdom (BPI)	Silver	200,000^{^}
^{^} Shipments figures based on certification alone.

== Release history ==
Region	Date	Format(s)	Label(s)	Ref.
United Kingdom	15 November 1993	12-inch vinyl; CD; cassette	Polydor	
Japan	20 December 1993	Mini-CD	Polydor	
Australia	21 March 1994	CD; cassette	Polydor	
