= The Longest Night (song) =

Song by Bee Gees

from the album E.S.P.
- Released: September 1987
- Recorded: January – March 1987, Middle Ear, Miami Beach and Criteria Studios, Miami
- Genre: R&B
- Length: 5:46
- Label: Warner Bros.
- Songwriters: Barry Gibb, Robin Gibb, Maurice Gibb
- Producers: Arif Mardin, Barry Gibb, Robin Gibb, Maurice Gibb, Brian Tench

"The Longest Night" is a ballad number performed by the Bee Gees, with lead vocals by Robin Gibb. This song was written by Barry Gibb, Robin Gibb and Maurice Gibb, and was released in September 1987, from the album E.S.P..

== Musical structure ==
On this song, it features Robin Gibb on lead vocal, but Barry's fingerprints are all over it: the variety of the melody, the flow of the lyric, and the inventive structure with two verses but no big chorus, all set a contemplative mood. The second time around, as it hits the second verse section, Robin goes off into a few lines of new melody as if he's been distracted by his thoughts. Barry chimes in with his falsetto voice for backing vocals. The musicians who played on this song were Barry Gibb and Nick Moroch on guitar, Maurice Gibb and Robbie Kondor on keyboards, drums programmed by Rhett Lawrence and Marcus Miller on bass. In 1989, the song was performed live in Rotterdam as part of the One For All Tour. In 2008, Robin mimed to the song on a UK show.

In 2010 the song appeared on Robin's disc of the Bee Gees' Mythology box set. Robin had personally selected the songs for this disc.

== Personnel ==
- Robin Gibb – lead vocal
- Barry Gibb – backing vocal, guitar
- Maurice Gibb – backing vocal, keyboards
- Robbie Kondor – keyboards
- Rhett Lawrence – drum programming
- Marcus Miller – bass
- Nick Moroch – guitar
