= Secret Love (Bee Gees song) =

1991 single by Bee Gees

Single by Bee Gees

from the album High Civilization
- B-side: "True Confessions"; "Human Sacrifice"
- Released: 18 February 1991
- Length: 3:39
- Label: Warner Bros.
- Songwriters: Barry Gibb, Robin Gibb, Maurice Gibb
- Producers: Barry, Robin and Maurice Gibb

Bee Gees singles chronology
| "Bodyguard" (1990) | "Secret Love" (1991) | "When He's Gone" (1991) |

Music video
- "Secret Love" on YouTube

"Secret Love" is a song by musical group the Bee Gees. It was released as the lead single from their 19th studio album, High Civilization (1991), on 18 February 1991 by Warner Bros. Records. It is an up-tempo song with a Supremes style similar to the 1986 Diana Ross hit "Chain Reaction", which was also written by the Bee Gees. The single reached the top 10 in several European countries but was not released as a single in the United States.

== Track listings ==
- 7-inch and cassette single
1. "Secret Love" (LP version)
2. "True Confessions"
- 12-inch and CD single
1. "Secret Love" (LP version)
2. "True Confessions"
3. "Human Sacrifice"
- Japanese mini-CD single
1. "Secret Love"
2. "Human Sacrifice"

== Charts ==
=== Weekly charts ===
| Chart (1991) | Peak position |
|---|---|
| Austria (Ö3 Austria Top 40) | 2 |
| Belgium (Ultratop 50 Flanders) | 8 |
| Europe (Eurochart Hot 100) | 3 |
| Europe (European Hit Radio) | 3 |
| Germany (GfK) | 2 |
| Greece (IFPI) | 10 |
| Ireland (IRMA) | 8 |
| Luxembourg (Radio Luxembourg) | 17 |
| Netherlands (Dutch Top 40) | 14 |
| Netherlands (Single Top 100) | 13 |
| Switzerland (Schweizer Hitparade) | 19 |
| UK Singles (Official Charts) | 5 |
| UK Airplay (Music Week) | 1 |

=== Year-end charts ===
| Chart (1991) | Position |
|---|---|
| Austria (Ö3 Austria Top 40) | 12 |
| Belgium (Ultratop 50 Flanders) | 76 |
| Europe (Eurochart Hot 100) | 33 |
| Europe (European Hit Radio) | 9 |
| Germany (Media Control) | 12 |
| UK Singles (OCC) | 63 |

=== Decade-end charts ===
| Chart (1990–1999) | Rank |
|---|---|
| Austria (Ö3 Austria Top 40) | 92 |

== Release history ==
| Region | Date | Format(s) | Label(s) | Ref. |
|---|---|---|---|---|
| United Kingdom | 18 February 1991 | 7-inch vinyl; 12-inch vinyl; CD | Warner Bros. | |
| Australia | 18 March 1991 | 7-inch vinyl; CD; cassette | Warner Bros. | |
| Japan | 10 May 1991 | Mini-CD | Warner Bros. | |

== See also ==
- List of European number-one airplay songs of the 1990s
