= Size Isn't Everything =

Studio album by the Bee Gees
- Released: 13 September 1993
- Recorded: August 1992–June 1993
- Studios: Middle Ear Studios (Miami Beach, Florida): Mayfair Studios (London, UK)
- Genres: Pop rock; dance-pop; acoustic; new jack swing
- Length: 50:43 (US); 55:39 (European)
- Label: Polydor
- Producers: Barry Gibb; Robin Gibb; Maurice Gibb

Bee Gees studio albums chronology
High Civilization (1991)	Size Isn't Everything (1993)	Still Waters (1997)

Singles from Size Isn't Everything
- 1. "Paying the Price of Love" Released: 9 August 1993; 2. "For Whom the Bell Tolls" Released: 15 November 1993; 3. "How to Fall in Love, Part 1" Released: 4 April 1994; 4. "Kiss of Life" Released: April 1994

Size Isn't Everything is the twentieth studio album by the Bee Gees, released in the UK on 13 September 1993, and the US on 2 November of the same year. The brothers abandoned the contemporary dance feel of the previous album High Civilization and went for what they would describe as "A return to our sound before Saturday Night Fever".

== Recording ==
The album marked the Bee Gees's return to Polydor Records after their three-album contract with Warner Bros. Records. The album was recorded following a time of considerable strain for the Gibb brothers. Maurice had only recently managed to overcome his long-term struggle with alcoholism and Barry Gibb's wife and prematurely newborn daughter both suffered ill health. Barry himself was also scheduled to have back surgery. Subsequently, on 6 March 1992, the brothers' father, Hugh Gibb, died, the day after the birthday of their late brother Andy, who had died in 1988. The album was dedicated to Hugh. Work on the album began in 1992.

== Content ==
The first track "Paying the Price of Love" has numerous "alternate mixes" available in different releases. "Kiss of Life" is an energetic rock/dance hybrid with an impressively complex vocal line involving distinctive Robin and Barry's solo vocals as well as the group's vocals. "Omega Man" and "Above and Beyond" feature lead vocals by Maurice Gibb. On "Haunted House", Barry commented in an interview with Q magazine, "I guess you could say the song's about divorce". According to Robin, "Heart Like Mine" was inspired by Enya's moody songs, and he gets some of the slow dreamy feel of her music. "Blue Island" was dedicated to the children of the former Yugoslavia and according to Barry that the song was the nicest track they had ever written.

"For Whom the Bell Tolls" became the biggest hit on Size Isn't Everything. The last track, "Decadance" was a new remix of the classic No. 1 hit "You Should Be Dancing", which was included only on the European version of the album. The unison scream of the line ("My baby moves at midnight") by Barry at 2:20 was first sung to the public back in 1989, towards the end of the One for All Tour in Melbourne.

The album cover photograph features the Old City Hall of Miami Beach in the background.

== Commercial reception ==
Professional ratings
Review scores
Source	Rating
AllMusic	3/5 stars
Music Week	3/5 stars
Philadelphia Inquirer	2/4 stars
The Rolling Stone Album Guide	2/5 stars

On 9 August 1993, the album's first single, "Paying the Price of Love", was released in the UK and peaked at No. 23. The album peaked at No. 33 in the UK in late September. It then disappeared from the charts, only to return in December 1993 when the album's second single, "For Whom the Bell Tolls", became a UK top five hit. The album again peaked at No. 23. In all, the album spent sixteen weeks inside the UK Top 100 and was certified gold by the BPI for sales of over 100,000 copies. A third single, the ballad "How to Fall in Love, Part 1", was released on 4 April 1994 in the UK, peaking at No. 30. This made Size Isn't Everything the first Bee Gees album to contain three UK top 30 hits since 1979's Spirits Having Flown and many consider this album their strongest post-disco album.

Reaction to the album in the US was less successful, where the album peaked at No. 153 and spent only three weeks inside the whole Billboard 200. The single "Paying the Price of Love" only reached No. 74 in the US during the fall of 1993, presumably because by 1993, the Bee Gees were an adult contemporary group and this single was too heavy for AC stations with its hip-hop influenced percussion. The European hit single, "For Whom the Bell Tolls", bubbled under on Billboard's Hot 100 at No. 109.

Reception of the album was mixed around the world, though it is notable that it was one of the most successful Bee Gees albums in Argentina, peaking at No. 1 due to the big success of "For Whom the Bell Tolls" there. Worldwide sales of the album are estimated to be over 700,000 copies. According to Barry, when asked on American breakfast shows why the album was called Size Isn't Everything, he explained that the Bee Gees have never been hyped and that they have always had to prove themselves musically, so the title came from that idea.

== Track listing ==
All tracks were written and composed by Barry, Robin & Maurice Gibb.

Size Isn't Everything track listing
No.	Title	Lead vocal(s)	Length
1.	"Paying the Price of Love"	Barry	4:12
2.	"Kiss of Life"	Robin and Barry	4:14
3.	"How to Fall in Love, Part 1"	Barry	5:59
4.	"Omega Man"	Maurice	3:59
5.	"Haunted House"	Barry and Robin	5:44
6.	"Heart Like Mine"	Robin and Barry	4:41
7.	"Anything for You"	Barry	4:36
8.	"Blue Island"	Barry and Robin	3:15
9.	"Above and Beyond"	Maurice and Barry	4:27
10.	"For Whom the Bell Tolls"	Barry and Robin	5:06
11.	"Fallen Angel"	Robin	4:30
12.	"Decadance" (not on US release)	Barry and Robin	4:31

== Personnel ==
Bee Gees

- Barry Gibb – vocals, guitars
- Robin Gibb – vocals
- Maurice Gibb – vocals, keyboards, guitars, lead vocals (4, 9)

Additional personnel

- Tim Moore – keyboards, programming
- Alan Kendall – guitars
- Tim Cansfield – guitars
- Slash – guitar (uncredited)
- Steve Howe – acoustic guitar (5) (uncredited)
- George "Chocolate" Perry – bass guitar
- Trevor Murrell – drums
- Luis Jardim – percussion
- Ed Calle – saxophone
- Gustav Lezcano – harmonica (8)

=== Production ===
- Bee Gees – producers, mixing
- Femi Jiya – engineer, mixing
- Chris Potter – assistant engineer
- Bob Ludwig – mastering at Gateway Mastering (Portland, Maine)
- Andy Earl – photography
- Stylorouge – art direction, design
- Allen Kovac and Left Bank Management – management

== Charts ==
Chart performance for Size Isn't Everything
Chart (1993)	Peak position
Australian Albums (ARIA)	117
Argentinean Albums Chart	1
Austrian Albums (Ö3 Austria)	6
Dutch Albums (Album Top 100)	28
European Albums (Music & Media)	28
German Albums (Offizielle Top 100)	12
Swedish Albums (Sverigetopplistan)	38
Swiss Albums (Schweizer Hitparade)	14
UK Albums Chart	23
US Billboard 200	153

== Certifications and sales ==
Certifications for Size Isn't Everything
Region	Certification	Certified units/sales
Germany	—	350,000
United Kingdom (BPI)	Gold	100,000^{^}
^{^} Shipments figures based on certification alone.
