= How to Fall in Love, Part 1 =

1994 single by Bee Gees

"How to Fall in Love, Pt. 1"

Single by Bee Gees

from the album Size Isn't Everything
- B-side: "855-7019"
- Released: April 4, 1994
- Recorded: 1992–1993
- Genre: Pop
- Length: 4:10 (Edit)
- Label: Polydor
- Songwriters: Barry, Robin & Maurice Gibb
- Producers: Barry Gibb; Robin Gibb; Maurice Gibb; Femi Jiya

Bee Gees singles chronology
"For Whom the Bell Tolls" (1993)	"How to Fall in Love, Pt. 1" (1994)	"Alone" (1997)

"How to Fall in Love (Part 1)" is a song by the Bee Gees, released in April 1994, by Polydor Records, as the third and final single issued from their twentieth studio album, Size Isn't Everything (1993). After the big hit of "For Whom the Bell Tolls", the Gibb brothers experienced a new European hit with this R&B ballad. The song was the result of one song written by Barry and another song written by Robin, mixed together. The single peaked at number thirty on the UK Singles Chart and dominated the top forty of some European countries.

In other countries in Europe, "Kiss of Life" was released in place of "How to Fall in Love, Part 1". Polydor affiliates thought the lively "Kiss of Life" more likely to get the charts.

== Critical reception ==
Sarra Manning from Melody Maker wrote, "The Bee Gees always leave me feeling whole again. They restore my bruised and battered equilibrium and give me strength to carry on. The brothers Gibb soothe away troubles with a honeyed groove and the seamless sense of completion that pours out of the speakers. Sometimes the most obvious routes to pleasure are obvious because they're so right. Go on, trust me on this. Let The Bee Gees slink into your life and make the hurt better." Alan Jones from Music Week gave the song a score of three out of five, saying, "Eschewing fashionable fads in favour of their usual combination of concise songwriting and stylish performance, the Bee Gees have already plugged this on Top of the Pops. And even though it is not in the same league as their last, 'For Whom the Bell Tolls', this is a sweet delight."

== Track listing ==
- 7" single (UK)

A: "How to Fall in Love, Part 1" [edit] - 4:10
B: "Fallen Angel" [Remix] - 7:09

- CD single (GER)
1. "How to Fall in Love, Part 1" [edit] - 4:10
2. "855-7019" - 6:22
3. "Fallen Angel" [Remix] - 7:09

Note: On the CD, "855-7019" features the sound of a needle being dropped at the very start and being lifted at the very end, respectively followed and preceded by surface noise, making it sound like a vinyl transfer. (In Germany, the song was originally featured on the B-side of the 7" single in its German release.) It is unclear whether the inclusion of such noises on the CD version is intentional.

- CD single
1. "How to Fall in Love, Part 1" [Edit] - 4:10
2. "I've Gotta Get a Message to You" [album version] - 2:50
3. "Tragedy" - 5:13
4. "New York Mining Disaster 1941" - 2:10

== Charts ==
Chart (1994)	Peak position
Europe (European Hot 100 Singles)	95
UK Singles (OCC)	30
UK Airplay (Music Week)	16
