= Bodyguard (Bee Gees song) =

Single by the Bee Gees

from the album One
- B-side: "Will You Ever Let Me"
- Released: January 1990
- Recorded: November to December 1988, Mayfair Studios, London
- Genre: R&B
- Length: 5:20 (album); 4:20 (promo single edit)
- Label: Warner Bros. Records, Warner Music
- Songwriters: Barry, Robin and Maurice Gibb
- Producers: Bee Gees, Brian Tench

The Bee Gees singles chronology
"One" (1989)	"Bodyguard" (1990)	"Secret Love" (1991)

Music video
- "Bodyguard" on YouTube

"Bodyguard" is a song by the Bee Gees released in 1990 as the second American single from the One album. "Bodyguard" was a cassette-only single released in early 1990. In Europe and Asia, the A-side was "Tokyo Nights" instead of "Bodyguard". In Brazil, it was "Wish You Were Here". Lead vocals are by Robin and Barry Gibb.

== Music video ==
The original video was deemed too sexual and was subsequently toned down. The controversy of the video hurt airplay of the single, though it charted well in the Adult Contemporary market reaching number 9 on Billboard and number 5 on Radio & Records.

== Charts ==
Chart (1990)	Peak position
Canada Top Singles (RPM)	48
US Adult Contemporary (Billboard)	9
