= List of European number-one hits of 1987 =

This is a list of the European Hot 100 Singles and European Top 100 Albums number ones of 1987, as published by Music & Media magazine.

== Chart history ==
Key
†	Indicates best-performing single and album of 1987

Issue date	Song	Artist	Album	Artist	Ref.
3 January	No chart published				
10 January	"The Final Countdown"	Europe	True Blue	Madonna	
17 January	"The Final Countdown"	Europe	True Blue	Madonna	
24 January	"The Final Countdown"	Europe	True Blue	Madonna	
31 January	"The Final Countdown"	Europe	True Blue	Madonna	
7 February	"The Final Countdown"	Europe	True Blue	Madonna	
14 February	"Is This Love?"	Alison Moyet	True Blue	Madonna	
21 February	"Is This Love?"	Alison Moyet	True Blue	Madonna	
28 February	"I Knew You Were Waiting (For Me)"	Aretha Franklin and George Michael	True Blue	Madonna	
7 March	"I Knew You Were Waiting (For Me)"	Aretha Franklin and George Michael	True Blue	Madonna	
14 March	"I Knew You Were Waiting (For Me)"	Aretha Franklin and George Michael	The Final Countdown	Europe	
21 March	"I Knew You Were Waiting (For Me)"	Aretha Franklin and George Michael	The Final Countdown	Europe	
28 March	"I Knew You Were Waiting (For Me)"	Aretha Franklin and George Michael	Graceland	Paul Simon	
4 April	"Running in the Family"	Level 42	The Joshua Tree	U2	
11 April	"Everything I Own"	Boy George	The Joshua Tree	U2	
18 April	"Everything I Own"	Boy George	The Joshua Tree	U2	
25 April	"Respectable"	Mel & Kim	The Joshua Tree	U2	
2 May	"Respectable"	Mel & Kim	The Joshua Tree	U2	
9 May	"Let It Be"	Ferry Aid	The Joshua Tree	U2	
16 May	"Let It Be"	Ferry Aid	The Joshua Tree	U2	
23 May	"La Isla Bonita" †	Madonna	The Joshua Tree	U2	
30 May	"La Isla Bonita" †	Madonna	The Joshua Tree	U2	
6 June	"With or Without You"	U2	The Joshua Tree	U2	
13 June	"La Isla Bonita" †	Madonna	The Joshua Tree	U2	
20 June	"La Isla Bonita" †	Madonna	The Joshua Tree	U2	
27 June	"I Wanna Dance with Somebody (Who Loves Me)"	Whitney Houston	The Joshua Tree	U2	
4 July	"I Wanna Dance with Somebody (Who Loves Me)"	Whitney Houston	The Joshua Tree	U2	
11 July	"I Wanna Dance with Somebody (Who Loves Me)"	Whitney Houston	The Joshua Tree	U2	
18 July	"I Wanna Dance with Somebody (Who Loves Me)"	Whitney Houston	The Joshua Tree	U2	
25 July	"I Wanna Dance with Somebody (Who Loves Me)"	Whitney Houston	The Joshua Tree	U2	
1 August	"I Wanna Dance with Somebody (Who Loves Me)"	Whitney Houston	Whitney	Whitney Houston	
8 August	"I Wanna Dance with Somebody (Who Loves Me)"	Whitney Houston	Whitney	Whitney Houston	
15 August	"I Wanna Dance with Somebody (Who Loves Me)"	Whitney Houston	Whitney	Whitney Houston	
22 August	"I Just Can't Stop Loving You"	Michael Jackson and Siedah Garrett	Whitney	Whitney Houston	
29 August	"I Just Can't Stop Loving You"	Michael Jackson and Siedah Garrett	Whitney	Whitney Houston	
5 September	"I Just Can't Stop Loving You"	Michael Jackson and Siedah Garrett	Whitney	Whitney Houston	
12 September	"I Just Can't Stop Loving You"	Michael Jackson and Siedah Garrett	Whitney	Whitney Houston	
19 September	"I Just Can't Stop Loving You"	Michael Jackson and Siedah Garrett	Whitney	Whitney Houston	
26 September	"I Just Can't Stop Loving You"	Michael Jackson and Siedah Garrett	Who's That Girl	Madonna	
3 October	"I Just Can't Stop Loving You"	Michael Jackson and Siedah Garrett	Bad †	Michael Jackson	
10 October	"Bad"	Michael Jackson	Bad †	Michael Jackson	
17 October	"Bad"	Michael Jackson	Bad †	Michael Jackson	
24 October	"Bad"	Michael Jackson	Bad †	Michael Jackson	
31 October	"Bad"	Michael Jackson	Bad †	Michael Jackson	
7 November	"Bad"	Michael Jackson	Bad †	Michael Jackson	
14 November	"Bad"	Michael Jackson	Bad †	Michael Jackson	
21 November	"You Win Again"	Bee Gees	Bad †	Michael Jackson	
28 November	"You Win Again"	Bee Gees	Bad †	Michael Jackson	
5 December	"You Win Again"	Bee Gees	Bad †	Michael Jackson	
12 December	"Faith"	George Michael	Faith	George Michael	
19 December	"Faith"	George Michael	Faith	George Michael	
26 December	"Faith"	George Michael	Faith	George Michael	
