= Pierre Terrasson =

French photographer (born 1952)

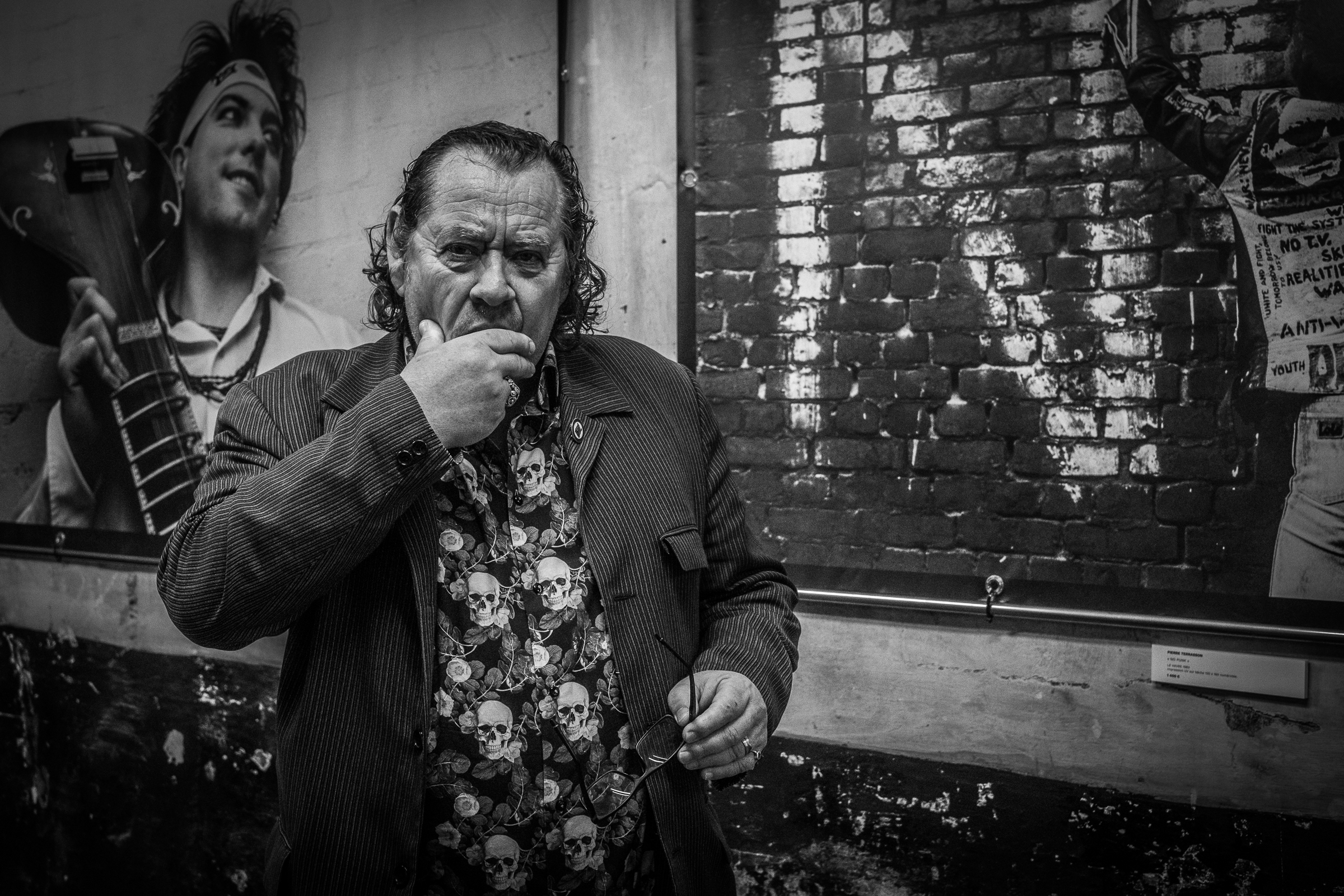

Pierre Terrasson (born 14 February 1952) is a French photographer, best known for photographing the rock music scene during the 1980s with publications that have included acts like Lou Reed, Stranglers, The Cure, Depeche Mode, Nina Hagen, and the Red Hot Chili Peppers.
