= Spirits Having Flown Tour =

1979 concert tour by the Bee Gees

- Tour by Bee Gees
- Promotional logo for the tour
- Location: North America
- Associated album: Spirits Having Flown
- Start date: 28 June 1979
- End date: 6 October 1979
- Legs: 2
- No. of shows: 56

Bee Gees concert chronology
- Children of the World Tour (1976); Spirits Having Flown Tour (1979); One for All World Tour (1989)

Spirits Having Flown Tour (also known as the Spirits Tour and the North American Tour) was the eighth concert tour by the Bee Gees in support of their fifteenth studio album Spirits Having Flown (1979). The tour began on 28 June 1979 in Fort Worth, Texas reaching a total of 38 cities before coming to a close on 6 October 1979 in Miami, Florida. It was their most lavish and successful tour during the height of their popularity following two straight number-one albums and six number-one singles and grossed over $10 million from 49 shows, as reported by Billboard by the end of its run. The tour was organized and promoted by Jerry Weintraub and Concerts West.

== Background ==
After the release of the Saturday Night Fever soundtrack, The Bee Gees were unable to tour due to their commitment to the Sgt. Pepper's Lonely Hearts Club Band movie. Then from March to November 1978, they spent much of their time in the studio recording Spirits Having Flown, the follow-up album to Saturday Night Fever.

Prior to the kickoff of the tour, The Bee Gees popularity grew even further following Saturday Night Fever, when they were the headline act on the Music for UNICEF Concert in January. Then they won four Grammy awards in February for Fever and by June, they pulled off a feat only matched by The Beatles with six consecutive US number-one singles, when "Love You Inside Out" topped the charts in June, setting the stage for the hottest summer tour since The Beatles in 1964.

In addition, the Bee Gees' brother Andy Gibb took part in the tour, making a guest vocal appearance; he, too, was at the height of his popularity, having notched three US Billboard number-one singles and appearing at the Music for UNICEF Concert.

Considering the group's popularity was at an all-time high, stringent security precautions were taken, though The Bee Gees themselves set up base in only five cities. They would fly to the next venue and return to their home base immediately following the show. They leased a custom 55-seat Boeing 720 jet (previously used by Led Zeppelin) at a cost of over one million dollars with a specially designed logo on the exterior of the plane. The Bee Gees were accompanied on the tour by a film crew capturing highlights of the shows, for use in an NBC-TV special which aired in November, hosted by David Frost.

The Bee Gees were joined on stage with their usual band featuring Alan Kendall on guitar, Blue Weaver on keyboards and Dennis Bryon on drums, as well as Boonero Horns, a 6-piece brass section and Sweet Inspirations, which provided backing vocals.

== The show ==
Given that this was the most ambitious tour The Bee Gees ever embarked on, there was a lot of preparation that went into the tour, from an extensive rehearsal schedule (in which The Bee Gees missed that year's Billboard music awards, where they won an astonishing 11 awards), staging and special effects, merchandising and tight security. The tour consisted of a 41-date schedule starting in Fort Worth, Texas and ending in their hometown of Miami, Florida. The 3 Gibb brothers were identically dressed in incredibly skin-tight, white satin trousers and dazzling white spangled jackets throughout the tour. During the Houston show on June 30, a bearded John Travolta joined the Bee Gees on stage during "You Should Be Dancing" to reprise some of his footwork from Saturday Night Fever. Travolta was in Houston shooting the film Urban Cowboy. Besides the surprise appearance by Travolta at the Houston concert, many celebrities were in attendance at many of the concerts. Among the 60,000 fans at L.A.'s Dodger Stadium were Cary Grant, Barbra Streisand, Rod Stewart, Olivia Newton-John, Karen Carpenter, Jack Nicholson and Harry Wayne Casey of KC & The Sunshine Band. Prior to their September 24 concert in Landover, the Bee Gees were invited to the White House where President Carter congratulated them for their efforts with UNICEF.

A scheduled concert in Kansas City, Missouri had to be cancelled due to severe damage to the roof of Kemper Arena during a violent storm on June 4.

== Personnel ==
- Barry Gibb – Lead vocal, guitar
- Robin Gibb – Vocals
- Maurice Gibb – Backing vocal, guitar
- Andy Gibb - Special Participation in Houston, Texas singing "You Should Be Dancing"
- Alan Kendall – Guitar
- Joey Murcia – Guitar
- Russell Powell - Guitar
- Blue Weaver – keyboards
- George Bitzer – Keyboards
- Harold Cowart – Bass
- Dennis Bryon – Drums
- Joe Lala – Percussion
- Boneroo Horns – Trumpets, Trombones, Saxophones
- Sweet Inspirations – Backing vocalists

== Setlist ==
1. "Tragedy"
2. "Edge of the Universe"
3. "Night Fever"
4. "Love So Right"
5. "Stayin' Alive"
6. "New York Mining Disaster 1941"
7. "Run to Me"
8. "Too Much Heaven"
9. "Holiday"
10. "I Can't See Nobody"
11. "Lonely Days"
12. "I Started a Joke"
13. "Massachusetts"
14. "How Can You Mend a Broken Heart"
15. "Nights on Broadway"
16. "To Love Somebody"
17. "Words"
18. "Wind of Change"
19. "How Deep Is Your Love"
20. "Jive Talkin'"

Encore

21. "You Should Be Dancing"

== Tour dates ==
List of 1979 concerts, showing date, city, country, venue, the opening act, tickets sold, number of available tickets and amount of gross revenue
Date	City	Country	Venue	Opening act	Attendance	Revenue
28 June 1979	Fort Worth	United States	Tarrant County Convention Center	Sweet Inspirations	13,901 / 13,901	$202,480
29 June 1979	Austin	United States	Special Events Center	Sweet Inspirations	17,440 / 17,440	$231,410
30 June 1979	Houston	United States	The Summit	Sweet Inspirations	16,654 / 16,654	$231,285
2 July 1979	Denver	United States	McNichols Sports Arena	Sweet Inspirations	—N/a	—N/a
3 July 1979	Salt Lake City	United States	Salt Palace	Sweet Inspirations	12,920 / 12,920	$177,748
5 July 1979	San Diego	United States	San Diego Sports Arena	Sweet Inspirations	12,714 / 12,714	$175,853
7 July 1979	Los Angeles	United States	Dodger Stadium	Sweet Inspirations	56,000 / 56,000	$700,000
9 July 1979	Oakland	United States	Oakland–Alameda County Coliseum Arena	Sweet Inspirations	38,078 / 38,078	$530,305
10 July 1979	Oakland	United States	Oakland–Alameda County Coliseum Arena	Sweet Inspirations	38,078 / 38,078	$530,305
11 July 1979	Oakland	United States	Oakland–Alameda County Coliseum Arena	Sweet Inspirations	38,078 / 38,078	$530,305
13 July 1979	Seattle	United States	Seattle Center Coliseum	Sweet Inspirations	26,707 / 26,707	$369,443
14 July 1979	Seattle	United States	Seattle Center Coliseum	Sweet Inspirations	26,707 / 26,707	$369,443
15 July 1979	Vancouver	Canada	Pacific Coliseum	Sweet Inspirations	15,158 / 15,158	$215,828
17 July 1979	Portland	United States	Memorial Coliseum	Sweet Inspirations	22,769 / 22,769	$320,458
18 July 1979	Portland	United States	Memorial Coliseum	Sweet Inspirations	22,769 / 22,769	$320,458
21 July 1979	Saint Paul	United States	St. Paul Civic Center	Sweet Inspirations	31,040 / 31,040	$434,445
22 July 1979	Saint Paul	United States	St. Paul Civic Center	Sweet Inspirations	31,040 / 31,040	$434,445
24 July 1979	Ames	United States	Hilton Coliseum	Sweet Inspirations	14,685 / 14,685	$204,220
25 July 1979	Madison	United States	Dane County Coliseum	Sweet Inspirations	9,883 / 9,883	$144,573
26 July 1979	Indianapolis	United States	Market Square Arena	Sweet Inspirations	17,730 / 17,730	$245,328
28 July 1979	Pontiac	United States	Pontiac Silverdome	Sweet Inspirations	36,270 / 36,270	$453,375
30 July 1979	Chicago	United States	Chicago Stadium	Sweet Inspirations	36,196 / 36,196	$507,573
31 July 1979	Chicago	United States	Chicago Stadium	Sweet Inspirations	36,196 / 36,196	$507,573
1 August 1979	St. Louis	United States	Checkerdome	Sweet Inspirations	16,834 / 16,834	$238,290
3 August 1979	Tulsa	United States	Mabee Center	Sweet Inspirations	10,586 / 10,586	$151,250
4 August 1979	Oklahoma City	United States	Myriad Convention Center	Sweet Inspirations	15,477 / 15,477	$217,920
27 August 1979	New Haven	United States	New Haven Veterans Memorial Coliseum	Sweet Inspirations	10,880 / 10,880	$157,768
28 August 1979	Providence	United States	Providence Civic Center	Sweet Inspirations	26,139 / 26,139	$371,368
29 August 1979	Providence	United States	Providence Civic Center	Sweet Inspirations	26,139 / 26,139	$371,368
31 August 1979	Toronto	Canada	Maple Leaf Gardens	Sweet Inspirations	18,249 / 18,249	$264,265
1 September 1979	Montreal	Canada	Montreal Forum	Burton Cummings	34,733 / 34,733	$484,984
2 September 1979	Montreal	Canada	Montreal Forum	Burton Cummings	34,733 / 34,733	$484,984
4 September 1979	Pittsburgh	United States	Civic Arena	Sweet Inspirations	—N/a	—N/a
5 September 1979	Pittsburgh	United States	Civic Arena	Sweet Inspirations	—N/a	—N/a
7 September 1979	New York City	United States	Madison Square Garden	Sweet Inspirations	—N/a	—N/a
8 September 1979	New York City	United States	Madison Square Garden	Sweet Inspirations	—N/a	—N/a
9 September 1979	New York City	United States	Madison Square Garden	Sweet Inspirations	—N/a	—N/a
11 September 1979	New York City	United States	Madison Square Garden	Sweet Inspirations	39,364 / 39,364	$376,000
12 September 1979	New York City	United States	Madison Square Garden	Sweet Inspirations	39,364 / 39,364	$376,000
14 September 1979	Buffalo	United States	Buffalo Memorial Auditorium	Sweet Inspirations	16,800 / 16,800	$236,492
15 September 1979	Cincinnati	United States	Riverfront Coliseum	Sweet Inspirations	33,334 / 33,334	$469,545
16 September 1979	Cincinnati	United States	Riverfront Coliseum	Sweet Inspirations	33,334 / 33,334	$469,545
18 September 1979	Richfield	United States	Richfield Coliseum	Sweet Inspirations	35,000 / 35,000	$496,000
19 September 1979	Richfield	United States	Richfield Coliseum	Sweet Inspirations	35,000 / 35,000	$496,000
21 September 1979	Philadelphia	United States	The Spectrum	Sweet Inspirations	29,056 / 29,056	$399,015
22 September 1979	Philadelphia	United States	The Spectrum	Sweet Inspirations	29,056 / 29,056	$399,015
24 September 1979	Landover	United States	Capital Centre	Sweet Inspirations	36,674 / 36,674	$515,568
25 September 1979	Landover	United States	Capital Centre	Sweet Inspirations	36,674 / 36,674	$515,568
26 September 1979	Norfolk	United States	Norfolk Scope Arena	Sweet Inspirations	11,854 / 11,854	$163,783
28 September 1979	Birmingham	United States	BJCC Coliseum	Sweet Inspirations	17,901 / 17,901	$243,583
29 September 1979	Atlanta	United States	Omni Coliseum	Sweet Inspirations	31,951 / 31,951	$455,315
30 September 1979	Atlanta	United States	Omni Coliseum	Sweet Inspirations	31,951 / 31,951	$455,315
2 October 1979	Greensboro	United States	Greensboro Coliseum	Sweet Inspirations	18,299 / 18,299	$213,980
3 October 1979	Columbia	United States	Carolina Coliseum	Sweet Inspirations	12,151 / 12,151	$171,065
4 October 1979	Jacksonville	United States	Jacksonville Veterans Memorial Coliseum	Sweet Inspirations	10,117 / 10,117	$140,580
6 October 1979	Miami	United States	Miami Stadium	Sweet Inspirations	—N/a	—N/a
Total					803,544 / 803,544	$10,911,095

Cancellations and rescheduled shows

2 August 1979	Kansas City, Missouri	Kemper Arena	Cancelled
3 August 1979	Kansas City, Missouri	Kemper Arena	Cancelled
26 August 1979	Boston, Massachusetts	Boston Garden	Cancelled
7 October 1979	St. Petersburg, Florida	Bayfront Center	Cancelled
