= E.S.P. (song) =

Single by the Bee Gees

from the album E.S.P.
- B-side: "Overnight"
- Released: 30 November 1987
- Recorded: January – March 1987; Middle Ear, and Criteria Studios, Miami
- Length: 5:38; 4:52 (stereo)
- Label: Warner Bros. Records, Warner Music
- Songwriter: Barry, Robin & Maurice Gibb
- Producers: Arif Mardin, Barry Gibb, Robin Gibb, Maurice Gibb, Brian Tench

The Bee Gees singles chronology
| "You Win Again" (1987) | "E.S.P." (1987) | "Crazy for Your Love" (1988) |

"E.S.P." is a single by the Bee Gees. Released in 1987, it was the follow-up to their successful single "You Win Again". The a cappella intro found on the album version was edited out for radio airplay.

== Origin and recording ==
The original title of the song is "XTC" or "Ecstasy" before the Gibbs realized that it sounded like a drug reference so they changed it to "E.S.P." Barry handles most lead vocal duties for this song while Robin sings a few lines and edges into falsetto for the choruses.

The demo of "E.S.P." was released in 1990 on the box set Tales from the Brothers Gibb, Like "You Win Again" it has the same drum program as the demo, and the same main vocal tracks, and it was speeded up by the same amount (103.25%), raising it a little more than a quarter tone, The finished version has a new a cappella opening and reaches the start of the demo at 0:33, There are seven edits, Both times through, four beats are dropped before the second verse ("There's danger"), The last two edits are additions going into the end, around 3:20, Not long after that the finished version has different ad lib vocals into the fade, Rhett Lawrence and Robbie Kondor are again the main musicians on the track, with Reb Beach. The finished version also features Robin screaming, unlike the demo where Barry's falsetto has a major presence. Brief studio footage of the brothers recording the vocals appeared in a German interview with Sabine Sauer.

== Single release ==
E.S.P. was less successful than the album's first single "You Win Again", only reaching number 8 in Switzerland and outside the top ten elsewhere. Warner Bros. pushed "E.S.P." even more heavily with many alternate mixes on 12-inch singles and promo discs. The reprise, a piece of the a cappella opening, was used as the closing number of the album.

The B-side "Overnight" featured lead vocals by Maurice Gibb.

== Personnel ==
- Barry Gibb – lead, harmony and backing vocals
- Robin Gibb – lead and backing vocals
- Maurice Gibb – backing vocals
- Robbie Kondor – keyboards
- Rhett Lawrence – drum programming, synthesizer
- Marcus Miller – bass
- Reb Beach – electric guitar

== Charts ==
| Chart (1987/88) | Peak position |
|---|---|
| Australia (Kent Music Report) | 89 |
| Austria (Ö3 Austria Top 40) | 21 |
| Belgium (Ultratop 50) | 12 |
| Denmark | 32 |
| Europe (European Hot 100 Singles) | 41 |
| Germany (Media Control Charts) | 13 |
| Netherlands (Dutch Top 40) | 26 |
| Switzerland (Swiss Hitparade) | 8 |
| UK Singles (Official Charts Company) | 51 |

=== Year-end charts ===
| Chart (1987/88) | Position |
|---|---|
| Belgium (Ultratop 50) | 24 |
| Netherlands (Dutch Top 40) | 87 |
| Switzerland (Swiss Hitparade) | 30 |
