= Paying the Price of Love =

1993 single by Bee Gees

Single by Bee Gees

from the album Size Isn't Everything
- B-side: "My Destiny"
- Released: 9 August 1993
- Genre: Disco
- Length: 4:12
- Label: Polydor
- Songwriters: Barry; Robin; Maurice Gibb
- Producers: Bee Gees; Femi Jiya

Bee Gees singles chronology
"Happy Ever After" (1991)	"Paying the Price of Love" (1993)	"For Whom the Bell Tolls" (1993)

"Paying the Price of Love" is the first single from the Bee Gees' 20th studio album, Size Isn't Everything (1993). The song was released in August 1993 by Polydor Records, reaching the top 10 in Belgium and Portugal, and the top 40 in Austria, Germany, the Netherlands, Switzerland, and the United Kingdom. In the United States, it charted on the Billboard Hot 100, reaching number 74, and peaked within the top 30 on the Billboard Adult Contemporary chart. The promotional video for the song, directed by Andy Delaney and Monty Whitebloom, shows the brothers performing the song as holograms on a futuristic version of MTV.

== Critical reception ==
Alan Jones from Music Week gave the song three out of five. He wrote, "Potently re-emerging at what seems like more regular intervals than Haley's [sic] Comet, the Bee Gees should be launched into another chart orbit by this, their first single for Polydor since the early Seventies. The brothers' sense of strong melodic material is still intact, as is Barry's falsetto. Keith Cohen's sparse house/jack remix should put this on the dancefloor and, with radio already taking the bait, a substantial hit is not out of the question."

== Track listings ==
- UK 7-inch and cassette single
- European CD single
- Japanese mini-CD single
1. "Paying the Price of Love" – 4:12
2. "My Destiny" – 3:42
- UK CD single
1. "Paying the Price of Love"
2. "Jive Talkin'"
3. "Night Fever"
4. "How Deep Is Your Love"
- US 12-inch single

A1. "Paying the Price of Love" (Jellybean mix 1) – 6:09
A2. "Paying the Price of Love" (Jellybean mix 2) – 6:09
B1. "Paying the Price of Love" (The Ocean Drive mix) – 6:08
B2. "Decadance" (classic house mix) – 8:42

- US maxi-CD single
1. "Paying the Price of Love" – 4:12
2. "Paying the Price of Love" (Jellybean mix 1 edit) – 4:05
3. "Paying the Price of Love" (Jellybean mix 1) – 6:09
4. "Paying the Price of Love" (The Ocean Drive mix) – 6:08
5. "Decadance" (classic house mix) – 8:42
- Australian CD single
1. "Paying the Price of Love" (7-inch mix)
2. "Paying the Price of Love" (KC mix)
3. "My Destiny"
4. "Paying the Price of Love" (The Ocean Drive mix)

== Personnel ==
- Barry Gibb – lead vocals, rhythm guitar
- Robin Gibb – harmony and backing vocals
- Maurice Gibb – backing and harmony vocals, keyboards
- Alan Kendall – lead guitar
- Tim Moore – keyboards, synthesizer, programming
- Tim Cansfield – lead guitar
- George "Chocolate" Perry – bass guitar
- Trevor Murrell – drums
- Luis Jardim – percussion

== Charts ==
=== Weekly charts ===
Chart (1993–1994)	Peak position
Austria (Ö3 Austria Top 40)	24
Belgium (Ultratop 50 Flanders)	5
Canada Top Singles (RPM)	53
Canada Adult Contemporary (RPM)	30
Europe (Eurochart Hot 100)	34
Europe (European Hit Radio)	5
France (SNEP)	42
Germany (GfK)	36
Iceland (Íslenski Listinn Topp 40)	23
Netherlands (Dutch Top 40)	13
Netherlands (Single Top 100)	19
Portugal (AFP)	4
Switzerland (Schweizer Hitparade)	22
UK Singles (Official Charts)	23
UK Airplay (Music Week)	11
US Billboard Hot 100	74
US Adult Contemporary (Billboard)	35
US Cash Box Top 100	70

=== Year-end charts ===
Chart (1993)	Position
Belgium (Ultratop 50 Flanders)	55
Europe (European Hit Radio)	22

== Release history ==
Region	Date	Format(s)	Label(s)	Ref.
United Kingdom	9 August 1993	7-inch vinyl; CD; cassette	Polydor	
Australia	13 September 1993	CD	Polydor	
Japan	26 September 1993	Mini-CD	Polydor	
