= The Bee Gees Special =

- Written by: Stuart Birnbaum; Ken Ehrlich
- Directed by: Louis J. Horvitz
- Starring: The Bee Gees; David Frost; Andy Gibb; Willie Nelson; Glen Campbell
- Country of origin: United States
- Original language: English

Production
- Producer: Ken Ehrlich
- Running time: 90 minutes

Original release
- Network: NBC
- Release: November 15, 1979

The Bee Gees Special is a 90-minute television special featuring The Bee Gees and broadcast by NBC on November 15, 1979. The program featured footage from the Bee Gees' July 10, 1979 concert at Oakland Coliseum Arena in Oakland, California, captured by a film crew that accompanied them during their Spirits Having Flown Tour. It also included footage from an appearance with Willie Nelson and Glen Campbell, interviews by David Frost with the Bee Gees and their parents, and a behind-the-scenes look at recording and tour planning with Robert Stigwood and the band's crew.

== Interviews/Songs ==
- Interview with David Frost
- In the studio rehearsing "Tragedy"
- Opening night of tour - "Stayin' Alive"
- Australian TV clip of "Spicks and Specks"
- Interview with Robert Stigwood
- Concert footage: "New York Mining Disaster 1941", "How Can You Mend a Broken Heart"
- Video montage - "How Deep Is Your Love"
- Tour planning
- 1967 U.K. TV clip - "Massachusetts"
- Concert footage: "Wind Of Change"
- Creating the explosion for the song "Tragedy"
- Concert footage: "I Started a Joke"
- Jam session with Willie Nelson and Glen Campbell: "Bye Bye Love", "All I Have to Do Is Dream", "Party Doll", "I Can't Stop Loving You", "To Love Somebody"
- In the studio recording "Tragedy"
- Interview with Barbara and Hugh Gibb
- Concert footage: "Nights on Broadway", "Words", "Jive Talkin'"
- Andy Gibb joins his brothers on stage for an extended version "You Should Be Dancing"
- Closing credits over "I've Gotta Get a Message to You"

== Reception ==
Diane Holloway of the Austin American-Statesman found the program "thoroughly enjoyable" and a "special treat", but found the interview segments trivial.
