= One (Bee Gees album) =

Studio album by the Bee Gees
- Released: 17 April 1989
- Recorded: March–April 1988, November–December 1988, February–March 1989
- Studios: Middle Ear Studios (Miami Beach, Florida); Mayfair Studios (London, UK)
- Length: 52:15
- Labels: Warner Bros. Records, Warner Music
- Producers: Barry Gibb, Maurice Gibb and Robin Gibb; Brian Tench

The Bee Gees chronology
E.S.P. (1987)	One (1989)	Tales from the Brothers Gibb (1990)

Singles from One
- 1. "Ordinary Lives" Released: March 1989 (EUR); 2. "One" Released: June 1989; 3. "Tokyo Nights" Released: October 1989; 4. "Bodyguard" Released: January 1990 (US); 5. "Wish You Were Here" Released: January 1990 (BR)

Professional ratings
Review scores
Source	Rating
AllMusic	2.5/5 stars
Record Mirror	3/5 stars
Rolling Stone	4/5 stars
The Rolling Stone Album Guide	2/5 stars

One is the Bee Gees's eighteenth studio album (sixteenth worldwide), released on 17 April 1989 in the UK, 24 April 1989 in Germany, and in July 1989 in the US. At the time of its release, the album had varying degrees of success across the world and saw them touring internationally for the first time since 1979 through the One for All World Tour.

In Europe, the album reached the top 10 in Germany and Switzerland and reached the top 30 in various other European countries (including the UK) and Australia. North American audiences had still not re-embraced the Bee Gees as they were still regarded as a disco group and the album failed to reach the top 40 in the US and Canada, despite the success of the title track reaching No. 7 in the US and No. 11 in Canada. Other singles from the album included "Bodyguard" and "Tokyo Nights". In the UK, none of the singles from the album reached the top 40.

== Background and recording ==
After the European success of their previous album, E.S.P., the Gibb brothers began to work on the One album in early 1988. According to Maurice, this album was supposed to be their first album as a 4-brother group (along with their brother Andy officially joining the group), but he died suddenly just five days after his 30th birthday. Thus, the Bee Gees took a short break before returning to the studio to work on the album, but this time they shifted to Mayfair Studios in London. The style of One was more melancholic than E.S.P., and heavily influenced by the loss of their brother. The album was dedicated to Andy and the song "Wish You Were Here" was written as a tribute to him.

The album was co-produced with Brian Tench, who had worked with them on the previous album. Related session outtake "Shape of Things to Come" was written for the Bee Gees' contribution to the 1988 Olympics album called One Moment in Time released the same year.

== Track listing ==
In the US, the bonus track, "Wing and a Prayer", was substituted with the group's European No. 1 hit, "You Win Again", and the positions of tracks 1 and 2 were swapped. On all vinyl releases of the album, the bonus track was omitted entirely.

All tracks are written by Barry, Robin & Maurice Gibb.

No.	Title	Lead vocal(s)	Length
1.	"Ordinary Lives"	Barry and Robin	4:01
2.	"One"	Barry	4:55
3.	"Bodyguard"	Robin and Barry	5:20
4.	"It's My Neighborhood"	Barry	4:19
5.	"Tears"	Barry	5:16
6.	"Tokyo Nights"	Robin	3:56
7.	"Flesh and Blood"	Robin and Barry	4:43
8.	"Wish You Were Here"	Barry	4:44
9.	"House of Shame"	Maurice and Barry	4:51
10.	"Will You Ever Let Me"	Barry	5:57
11.	"Wing and a Prayer"	Barry	4:05
Total length:			52:15

The Warner Bros. Years bonus tracks
No.	Title	Lead vocal(s)	Length
12.	"Shape of Things to Come"	Barry	4:18
13.	"One" (edit)		3:50
14.	"One" (12" dance version)		8:44
15.	"One" (12" club mix)		9:02
Total length:			78:07

== Personnel ==
Bee Gees

- Barry Gibb – vocals, guitars
- Robin Gibb – vocals
- Maurice Gibb – vocals, keyboards, guitars, lead vocals (9)

Additional musicians

- Peter-John Vettese – keyboards
- Tim Cansfield – guitars
- Alan Kendall – guitars (4, 6, 9)
- Nathan East – bass guitar
- Steve Ferrone – drums

=== Production ===
- Bee Gees – producers, mixing (11)
- Brian Tench – producer (1–10) engineer, mixing
- Mark Robinson – second engineer
- Noel Rafferty – assistant engineer
- Scott Glasel – production assistant, additional engineer (1), mixing (11)
- Ross Alexander – technical supervisor
- Mike Korey – technical supervising assistant
- George Marino – mastering at Sterling Sound (New York, NY)
- Martyn Atkins – design, art direction
- Larry Williams – cover photography
- Peter Corvin-Brittin – inside photography

== Charts ==
Chart (1989)	Peak position
Australia (ARIA)	29
Austria (Ö3 Austria Top 40)	23
Canada (RPM)	46
European Albums (Music & Media)	10
France (SNEP)	16
Germany (Media Control AG)	4
Italy (Musica e dischi)	39
Japan (Oricon)	63
Netherlands (MegaCharts)	22
Norway (VG-lista)	19
Sweden (Sverigetopplistan)	42
Switzerland (Swiss Hitparade)	6
UK Albums (The Official Charts Company)	29
US Billboard 200	68

== Certifications ==
Region	Certification	Certified units/sales
Australia (ARIA)	Gold	35,000^{^}
France (SNEP)	Gold	100,000^{*}
Germany (BVMI)	Gold	250,000^{^}
Netherlands (NVPI)	Gold	50,000^{^}
Switzerland (IFPI Switzerland)	Gold	25,000^{^}
^{*} Sales figures based on certification alone.^{^} Shipments figures based on certification alone.
