= E.S.P. (Bee Gees album) =

Studio album by the Bee Gees
- Released: 21 September 1987 (UK); 12 October 1987 (US)
- Recorded: January – March 1987
- Studios: Middle Ear; Miami Beach and Criteria Studios; Miami; Florida
- Genre: Synth-pop
- Length: 48:16
- Labels: Warner Bros.; Warner Music
- Producers: Arif Mardin; Barry Gibb; Robin Gibb; Maurice Gibb; Brian Tench

The Bee Gees chronology
Staying Alive: The Original Motion Picture Soundtrack (1983)	E.S.P. (1987)	One (1989)

Singles from E.S.P.
- 1. "You Win Again" Released: 7 September 1987; 2. "E.S.P." Released: 30 November 1987; 3. "Crazy for Your Love" Released: 8 February 1988

Professional ratings
Review scores
Source	Rating
AllMusic	2/5 stars
Los Angeles Times	3/4 stars
Number One	4/5 stars
Record Mirror	4/5 stars
The Rolling Stone Album Guide	2/5 stars

E.S.P. is the seventeenth studio album (fifteenth worldwide) by the Bee Gees, released in 1987. It was the band's first studio album in six years, and their first release under their new contract with Warner Bros. It marked the first time in twelve years the band had worked with producer Arif Mardin, and was their first album to be recorded digitally.

After the band's popularity had waned following the infamous Disco Demolition Night of 1979, the Gibb brothers had spent much of the early 1980s writing and producing songs for other artists, as well as pursuing solo projects, and E.S.P. was very much a comeback to prominence.

The album sold well in Europe, reaching No. 5 in the UK, No. 2 in Norway and Austria, and No. 1 in Germany and Switzerland, though it failed to chart higher than No. 96 in the US. The album's first single, "You Win Again", reached No. 1 in the UK, Ireland, Switzerland, Germany, Austria and Norway.

The album cover photographs show the Gibb brothers at Castlerigg stone circle near Keswick in England's Lake District.

== History ==
With the Bee Gees now back in the Warner-Elektra-Atlantic conglomerate, producer Arif Mardin was once again available to work with them. The Gibb brothers began writing and recording songs for E.S.P. around September 1986. They worked at Maurice's home studio, informally known as Panther House, rather than at Middle Ear. Maurice set everything up and Scott Glasel was effectively the assistant engineer.

Scott's recollection years later is that Barry brought in the songs as demos, featuring just his voice and guitar, and that they recorded the fuller demos based on Barry's songs. Scott also recalls Barry and Robin many times arguing heatedly over trivial things and calling off the project, only to have Maurice call Scott a few days later to let him know they were starting again.

== Recording ==
Over previous years Barry and Robin had become accustomed to different recording styles. Barry preferred to write the songs and record demos, then go into the studio with session players to record polished versions for release. Robin instead liked to use the recording sessions themselves to work out the songs. Maurice liked a hands-on approach and where he had a voice in production he either appears prominently on the finished tracks or worked out arrangements with a few session players during recording.

The compromise recording method adopted for E.S.P. was for the brothers to start all the recordings themselves and then complete them with session players and a producer. If they started with an idea and a rhythm track, they built a song onto it as they recorded, something that would accommodate what all three preferred to do. The result of this process would then be a demo, with vocals by the three brothers and instrumentals by Maurice and Barry. The album made extensive use of the Fairlight CMI as much of the drumming was programmed using the instrument by Barry and Maurice and their engineer Scott Glasel. The Gibb instrumental tracks were done from October into 1987.

The second stage appears to have been recording the main vocal tracks, and where this was done is unknown. The demo of "E.S.P." on the box set Tales from the Brothers Gibb is at this second stage. Lastly, session musicians replaced most of the instrumental parts and the brothers dubbed additional vocals. They also edited some of the tracks, inserted new sections, and sped up at least two of them. A song titled "Young Love" was scrapped from the album, and was the only outtake.

The song "This Is Your Life", contains lyrical references to several Bee Gees songs, including "Lonely Days", "Love So Right", "Tragedy (Bee Gees song)", "Stayin' Alive", "Jive Talkin'", "Too Much Heaven", "How Deep Is Your Love (Bee Gees song)", "Run to Me (Bee Gees song)", "How Can You Mend a Broken Heart", and "Nights On Broadway".

== Track listing ==
All tracks are written by Barry, Robin, and Maurice Gibb.

No.	Title	Lead vocals	Length
1.	"E.S.P."	Barry and Robin	5:38
2.	"You Win Again"	Barry	4:02
3.	"Live or Die (Hold Me Like a Child)"	Barry	4:41
4.	"Giving Up the Ghost"	Robin and Maurice	4:26
5.	"The Longest Night"	Robin	5:46
6.	"This Is Your Life"	Barry	4:50
7.	"Angela"	Barry	4:57
8.	"Overnight"	Maurice	4:20
9.	"Crazy for Your Love"	Barry	4:40
10.	"Backtafunk"	Barry	4:22
11.	"E.S.P. (Reprise)"	Barry and Robin	0:34
Total length:			48:16

The Warner Bros. Years bonus tracks
No.	Title	Length
12.	"E.S.P" (demo version)	4:43
13.	"Angela" (edit)	4:18
14.	"E.S.P" (edit)	4:17
15.	"You Win Again" (extended version)	5:14
16.	"E.S.P" (extended version)	6:15
Total length:		73:02

== Personnel ==
Bee Gees

- Barry Gibb – vocals, acoustic guitar, drum programming (3, 7), bass programming (3), electric rhythm guitar (4), additional arrangements (5, 6, 10), percussion programming (7), additional electric guitar (8), track arrangements
- Robin Gibb – vocals, basic track arrangements
- Maurice Gibb – vocals, keyboards, synthesizer programming, guitars, bass, drum programming (2, 3), additional arrangements (5), electric guitar sequencing (6), acoustic guitar (7), additional electric guitar (8), track arrangements

Additional musicians

- Scott Glasel – programming assistant
- Robbie Kondor – keyboards (1–5, 7, 8, 10), synth bass (2, 3), acoustic guitar (3), acoustic piano solo (4), keyboard sequencing (10)
- Rhett Lawrence – synthesizer programming (1, 5), drum programming (1, 2, 5, 8), keyboards (7), bass programming (8)
- Greg Phillinganes – synthesizer lead (4), keyboards (6, 9), electric piano (7), bass sequencing (9)
- Reb Beach – electric guitar (1, 8), guitar solo (8)
- Reggie Griffin –electric rhythm guitar (4), bass sequencing (4), rhythm track programming (4), arrangements (4), electric guitar (10), basic track arrangements
- Nick Moroch – electric guitar (5, 7, 10), additional electric guitar (8)
- Marcus Miller – bass guitar (1, 5, 10)
- Joe Mardin – bass programming (6), drum programming (6, 9), bass sequencing (9)
- Will Lee – bass guitar (7)
- Tony Beard – drums (4, 10)
- Brian Tench – additional percussion programming (4), percussion programming (6, 7), drum programming (7)
- Sammy Figueroa – percussion (10)
- Bob Gay – saxophone (10)
- Arif Mardin – basic track arrangements, string arrangements (3, 6), electric guitar sequencing (6), horn arrangements (6), additional arrangements (6, 10), synth bass (10)
- Gene Orloff – concertmaster (3)

=== Production ===
- Bee Gees – producers
- Arif Mardin – producer
- Brian Tench – co-producer, recording, mixing
- Scott Glasel – recording assistant
- Claude "Swifty" Achille – additional recording
- Ellen Fitton – additional recording
- Michael O'Reilly – additional recording
- Ken Steiger – additional recording
- George Marino – mastering at Sterling Sound (New York, NY)
- Martyn Atkins – art direction, design
- David A. Jones – design
- Andy Earl – photography
- Jeri Heiden – artwork supervision
- Gary Borman and Harriett Sternberg – management

== Charts ==
=== Weekly charts ===
Chart (1987/88)	Peak position
Australian Kent Music Report	25
Austrian Albums Chart	2
Canadian RPM Albums Chart	87
Dutch Albums Chart	9
European Albums Chart	5
Japanese Oricon Albums Chart	26
New Zealand Albums Chart	44
Norwegian VG-lista Albums Chart	2
Spanish Albums Chart	32
Swedish Albums Chart	25
Swiss Albums Chart	1
UK Albums Chart	5
US Billboard 200	96
West German Media Control Albums Chart	1

=== Year-end charts ===
Chart (1987)	Position
UK Albums Chart	53
Chart (1988)	Position
Austrian Albums Chart	21
Swiss Albums Chart	25

== Certifications and sales ==
Region	Certification	Certified units/sales
Germany (BVMI)	3× Gold	750,000^{^}
Hong Kong (IFPI Hong Kong)	Gold	10,000^{*}
Spain (Promusicae)	Gold	50,000^{^}
Switzerland (IFPI Switzerland)	2× Platinum	100,000^{^}
United Kingdom (BPI)	Platinum	300,000^{^}
Summaries
Worldwide	—	2,000,000
^{*} Sales figures based on certification alone.^{^} Shipments figures based on certification alone.
