= One (Bee Gees song) =

Single by Bee Gees

from the album One
- B-side: "Flesh and Blood" (UK); "Wing and a Prayer" (US)
- Released: June 1989 (UK); July 1989 (US)
- Recorded: November to December 1988
- Studio: Mayfair Studios, London
- Genre: Pop; synth-pop
- Length: 4:55 (album version); 4:15 (single edit); 3:50 (promo remix/edit)
- Label: Warner Bros. Records, Warner Music
- Songwriters: Barry, Robin & Maurice Gibb
- Producers: The Bee Gees, Brian Tench

Bee Gees singles chronology
"Ordinary Lives" (1989)	"One" (1989)	"Bodyguard" (1989)

"One" is a 1989 song by the Bee Gees and the title track from the album of the same name, released as its second international single and lead single in the United States. The song returned the Bee Gees to American radio and would turn out to be their biggest US hit in the 1980s, and their last hit single to reach the US top ten. It was their first Top 10 hit since "Love You Inside Out" was number 1 in June 1979. It peaked at number seven on the Billboard Hot 100 chart in September 1989, and it stayed in the Top 40 for ten weeks.

It also topped the American adult contemporary chart that same month, remaining at number one for two weeks. The track reached number 71 in the UK Singles Chart.

== Charts ==
=== Weekly charts ===
Chart (1989)	Peak position
Argentina	7
Belgium (Ultratop 50 Flanders)	38
Brazil	8
Canada (The Record)	18
Canada Top Singles (RPM)	11
Europe (European Hot 100 Singles)	97
Germany (GfK)	37
Netherlands (Single Top 100)	46
UK Singles (Official Charts)	71
US Billboard Hot 100	7

=== Year-end charts ===
Chart (1989)	Position
Canada Top Singles (RPM)	88
