= You Win Again (Bee Gees song) =

1987 single by Bee Gees

- UK 12-inch vinyl

Single by Bee Gees

from the album E.S.P.
- B-side: "Backtafunk"
- Released: 7 September 1987
- Genre: Synth-pop
- Length: 4:01 (album version); 3:54 (7-inch fade)
- Label: Warner Bros.; Warner Music
- Songwriters: Barry Gibb; Robin Gibb; Maurice Gibb
- Producers: Arif Mardin; Barry Gibb; Robin Gibb; Maurice Gibb; Brian Tench

Bee Gees singles chronology
"Someone Belonging to Someone" (1983)	"You Win Again" (1987)	"E.S.P." (1987)

Alternative cover
- Japanese 7-inch vinyl artwork

Music video
- "You Win Again" on YouTube

"You Win Again" is a song written by Barry, Robin and Maurice Gibb and performed by the Bee Gees. The song was produced by the brothers, Arif Mardin and Brian Tench. It was released as the first single on 7 September 1987 by Warner Records, from their seventeenth studio album E.S.P. (1987). It was also their first single released from the record label. The song marked the start of the group's comeback, becoming a No. 1 hit in many European countries, including topping the UK Singles Chart—their first to do so in over eight years—and making them the first group to score a UK No. 1 hit in each of three decades: the 1960s, 1970s, and 1980s.

As songwriters, the Gibb brothers received the 1987 British Academy's Ivor Novello award for Best Song Musically and Lyrically. In 1988, the band received a Brit Award nomination for Best British Group. In a UK television special on ITV in December 2011, it was voted second (behind "How Deep Is Your Love") on The Nation's Favourite Bee Gees Song.

The single cover photograph show the Gibb brothers at Castlerigg stone circle near Keswick in England's Lake District.

== Recording ==
Barry Gibb came up with the melody in a dream, while his brother Maurice Gibb conceived the drum machine sounds in his garage.

== Critical and commercial reception ==
Cash Box called it "a melodic soft-pop number guaranteed to see instant attention". Alexis Petridis of The Guardian described "You Win Again" as a "perfect pop song", praising its unusual production and distinctive drum track.

"You Win Again" was a number one single in the UK, Ireland, Switzerland, West Germany, Austria, Denmark and Norway, and reached the top ten in Italy, the Netherlands, Australia and Sweden. It also topped the Eurochart for four weeks.

"You Win Again" entered the UK Singles Chart at No. 87 in the chart week 19 September. Four weeks later, it reached number one, where it remained for four weeks, thus preventing George Michael's single "Faith" from reaching the top spot. When the single reached number one in the UK in mid-October 1987, it marked the Bee Gees as the first group to score a UK number one hit in each of three decades: the 1960s, 1970s and 1980s. It ranked four in the UK's year-end singles sales chart.

"You Win Again" was less successful in the US, peaking at No. 75 on Billboard's Hot 100, perhaps down to a lingering association between the Bee Gees and the disco backlash that emerged in 1979, when the group (disco icons at the time) were at the height of their fame. Their next charting single, the 1989 hit "One", returned them to the US top ten. Hoping to capitalize on that success, the song was rereleased as the followup; while it did receive renewed airplay on a number of US radio stations, it did not chart this time.

== Formats ==
"You Win Again" was released commercially on vinyl and cassette. The CD single was not common in the late 1980s, though a 1-track CD single was produced as a promo-only copy given to radio stations and reviewers in the United States and a 1988 2-track mini CD single was commercially released in Japan. The song also appeared as a bonus track on the American version of One, replacing the song "Wing and a Prayer".

== Releases and track listings ==
7-inch vinyl single
No.	Title	Writer(s)	Length
1.	"You Win Again"	Barry, Robin & Maurice Gibb	3:54
2.	"Backtafunk"	Barry, Robin & Maurice Gibb	4:22

12-inch vinyl single
No.	Title	Writer(s)	Length
1.	"You Win Again" (extended version)	Barry, Robin & Maurice Gibb	5:14
2.	"You Win Again" (fade)	Barry, Robin & Maurice Gibb	3:54
3.	"Backtafunk" (LP version)	Barry, Robin & Maurice Gibb	4:22

CD single – Japan
No.	Title	Writer(s)	Length
1.	"You Win Again" (7-inch fade version)	Barry, Robin & Maurice Gibb	3:59
2.	"E.S.P."	Barry, Robin & Maurice Gibb	4:22

== Personnel ==
Personnel are adapted from the album E.S.P.

- Barry Gibb – lead vocals and backing vocals, guitars
- Robin Gibb – backing vocals
- Maurice Gibb – synthesizers and backing vocals
- Robbie Kondor – synthesizers
- Rhett Lawrence – drum machine

== Charts ==
=== Weekly charts ===
1987 weekly chart performance for "You Win Again"
Chart (1987)	Peak position
Australia (Australian Music Report)	10
Austria (Ö3 Austria Top 40)	1
Belgium (Ultratop 50 Flanders)	2
Canada Adult Contemporary (RPM)	7
Denmark (Hitlisten)	1
Europe (Eurochart Hot 100)	1
Finland (Suomen virallinen lista)	14
France (SNEP)	14
Iceland (Vikan)	2
Ireland (IRMA)	1
Italy (Musica e dischi)	5
Netherlands (Dutch Top 40)	5
Netherlands (Single Top 100)	6
New Zealand (Recorded Music NZ)	18
Norway (VG-lista)	1
South Africa (Springbok Radio)	2
Spain (AFYVE)	18
Sweden (Sverigetopplistan)	8
Switzerland (Schweizer Hitparade)	1
UK Singles (Official Charts)	1
US Billboard Hot 100	75
US Adult Contemporary (Billboard)	50
US Cash Box	76
West Germany (GfK)	1

2026 weekly chart performance for "You Win Again"
Chart (2026)	Peak position
Norway Airplay (IFPI Norge)	65

=== Year-end charts ===
1987 year-end chart performance for "You Win Again"
Chart (1987)	Position
Australia (Australian Music Report)	74
Austria (Ö3 Austria Top 40)	27
Belgium (Ultratop 50 Flanders)	14
Europe (European Hot 100)	24
Netherlands (Dutch Top 40)	29
Netherlands (Single Top 100)	43
Switzerland (Schweizer Hitparade)	27
UK Singles (OCC)	4
West Germany (Media Control)	12

1988 year-end chart performance for "You Win Again"
Chart (1988)	Position
West Germany (Media Control)	65

== Certifications and sales ==
Certifications and sales for "You Win Again"
Region	Certification	Certified units/sales
Denmark (IFPI Danmark)	Gold	45,000^{‡}
France (SNEP)	Silver	250,000^{*}
Germany (BVMI)	Platinum	500,000^{^}
New Zealand (RMNZ)	Gold	15,000^{‡}
United Kingdom (BPI)	Gold	555,000
^{*} Sales figures based on certification alone.^{^} Shipments figures based on certification alone.^{‡} Sales+streaming figures based on certification alone.

== See also ==
- List of European number-one hits of 1987
- List of number-one hits of 1987 (Germany)
- List of number-one singles of 1987 (Ireland)
- List of number-one songs in Norway
- List of number-one singles of the 1980s (Switzerland)
- List of UK Singles Chart number ones of the 1980s
