= The Eyes That See in the Dark Demos =

Demo album by Barry Gibb
- Released: 10 October 2006
- Recorded: August 1982, January–February, April 1983
- Studio: Criteria (Miami)
- Genre: Country, roots rock
- Length: 40:34

Barry Gibb demo albums chronology
The Heartbreaker Demos (2006)	The Eyes That See in the Dark Demos (2006)	The Eaten Alive Demos (2006)

The Eyes That See in the Dark Demos is an album of demos by Barry Gibb created for the production of Kenny Rogers' 1982 album Eyes That See in the Dark. Originally circulating as a bootleg, the collection saw a legitimate release on iTunes in October 2006.

Maurice Gibb contributed bass, guitar and synthesizer and Robin Gibb contributed background vocals on some demos.

== History ==
In August 1982, having completing work writing and producing songs for Dionne Warwick's 1982 album Heartbreaker, Gibb began work on "Eyes That See in the Dark", for Kenny Rogers after Rogers had earlier requested songs from Gibb. Work on songs from Rogers was interrupted by the production of Staying Alive, the 1983 sequel to Saturday Night Fever starring John Travolta and directed by Sylvester Stallone, which was to feature new songs by the Bee Gees.

In January, 1983, Gibb returned to work on songs for Rogers, including "You and I", "This Woman" and "Midsummer Nights". In February, Gibb continued to record songs for both Staying Alive and Rogers' new album, including "Hold Me", "Living with You", "Buried Treasure" and "Islands in the Stream". In April 1983, the last recording sessions for Rogers' album yielded "Saying Good-Bye", "Evening Star" and "I Will Always Love You".

Rogers began recordings for Eyes That See in the Dark in May, 1983 and the album was released in August of that year.

== Track listing ==
No.	Title	Writer(s)	Length
1.	"This Woman"	Barry Gibb, Albhy Galuten	4:10
2.	"You and I"	Barry Gibb, Robin Gibb, Maurice Gibb	4:29
3.	"Buried Treasure"	Barry Gibb, Robin Gibb, Maurice Gibb	4:04
4.	"Islands in the Stream"	Barry Gibb, Robin Gibb, Maurice Gibb	4:11
5.	"Living with You"	Barry Gibb, Robin Gibb, Maurice Gibb	3:09
6.	"Evening Star"	Barry Gibb, Maurice Gibb	4:09
7.	"Hold Me"	Barry Gibb, Robin Gibb, Maurice Gibb	4:14
8.	"Midsummer Nights"	Barry Gibb, Albhy Galuten	3:45
9.	"I Will Always Love You"	Barry Gibb, Maurice Gibb	4:20
10.	"Eyes That See in the Dark"	Barry Gibb, Maurice Gibb	4:03

== Personnel ==
- Barry Gibb — lead, harmony and background vocals, guitar
- Maurice Gibb — bass, synthesizer, guitar, background vocals
- Albhy Galuten — piano, synthesizer
- Robin Gibb — background vocals
