= The Heartbreaker Demos =

Demo album by Barry Gibb
- Released: 10 October 2006
- Recorded: February 1982
- Studio: Criteria (Miami)
- Genre: R&B, adult contemporary
- Length: 36:48
- Producer: Barry Gibb

Barry Gibb demo albums chronology
The Guilty Demos (2006)	The Heartbreaker Demos (2006)	The Eyes That See in the Dark Demos (2006)

The Heartbreaker Demos is an album of demos by Barry Gibb created for the production of Dionne Warwick's 1982 album Heartbreaker. Originally circulating as a bootleg, the collection saw a legitimate release on iTunes in October 2006. The album does not include the non-Gibb composition from the album, "Our Day Will Come", or the songs "Oceans and Rivers", "Broken Bottles", "Never Get Over You" and "Stay Alone", which were demoed, but not used on the album.

For most of the demos, Gibb sings in falsetto.

== History ==
On the start of 1982, Clive Davis asked Gibb to write for Dionne Warwick, who was on his Arista label. Recording songs for Warwick started in February 1982. Gibb and Albhy Galuten repeated the same strategy they used for Barbra Streisand's Guilty album (1980), recording all of the songs as good quality demos and then recording them again for release. Warwick began recording songs in April, 1982.

Unused track "Stay Alone" was later recorded by Gibb himself for his album Now Voyager (1984) and was also released as a B-side of his 1984 single "Fine Line".

"Broken Bottles" was released in 2014 on the Expanded Edition of Warwick's 1985 album Finder of Lost Loves. The liner notes state that Barry Manilow produced the track.

== Track listing ==
All tracks are written by Barry Gibb, Robin Gibb, and Maurice Gibb, except where noted.

No.	Title	Length
1.	"Heartbreaker"	4:32
2.	"It Makes No Difference" (B. Gibb, Albhy Galuten)	4:26
3.	"Yours"	5:01
4.	"Take the Short Way Home" (B. Gibb, Galuten)	4:07
5.	"Misunderstood"	3:56
6.	"All the Love in the World"	3:43
7.	"I Can't See Anything (But You)"	3:19
8.	"Just One More Night" (B. Gibb, Galuten)	3:52
9.	"You Are My Love"	3:52

== Personnel ==
- Barry Gibb — vocals, guitar
- Albhy Galuten — piano, synthesizer
- Uncredited – drums
