= Eyes That See in the Dark (song) =

1983 single by Kenny Rogers

Single by Kenny Rogers

from the album Eyes That See in the Dark
- B-side: "Buried Treasure" (UK); "Hold Me" (US)
- Released: August 1983 (UK); April 1984 (US)
- Recorded: May 1983
- Studio: Middle Ear, Miami; Lion Share, Los Angeles; Ocean Way, Hollywood
- Genre: Country, adult contemporary
- Length: 4:05
- Label: RCA
- Songwriter(s): Barry Gibb, Maurice Gibb
- Producer(s): Gibb-Galuten-Richardson

Kenny Rogers singles chronology
"Islands in the Stream" (1983)	"Eyes That See in the Dark" (1983)	"This Woman" (1983)
"Buried Treasure" (1983)	"Eyes That See in the Dark" (1984)	"Evening Star" (1984)

"Eyes That See in the Dark" is a song written by Barry and Maurice Gibb in 1982. It was recorded by American singer Kenny Rogers for his 1983 album of the same name. It reached #30 on the US Country chart, #4 on the US Adult Contemporary chart, #61 in the United Kingdom and #79 on the Billboard Hot 100.

Recording took place at Middle Ear Studios in Florida, Lion Share Recording Studios and Ocean Way Recording in Los Angeles. In the UK, RCA seemed afraid of the full-out country voice of Dolly Parton as it was released as a single before "Islands in the Stream". In the US, this was the third single off the album with "Hold Me" as the B-side.

The guitars were played by Barry Gibb, Maurice Gibb, Tim Renwick and George Terry .

== Charts ==
=== Weekly charts ===
Chart (1983–1984)	Peak position
UK Singles (OCC)	61
US Billboard Hot 100	79
US Adult Contemporary (Billboard)	4
US Hot Country Songs (Billboard)	30

=== Year-end charts ===
Chart (1984)	Position
US Adult Contemporary (Billboard)	43

== Personnel ==
- Kenny Rogers — vocals
- Barry Gibb — background vocals, guitar
- Maurice Gibb — bass, guitar, background vocals
- Tim Renwick — guitar
- George Terry — guitar
- George Bitzer – piano, synthesizer
- Albhy Galuten — piano, synthesizer
- Ron Ziegler – drums

== Barry Gibb version ==
"Eyes That See in the Dark"

Song by Barry Gibb

from the album The Eyes That See in the Dark Demos
- Released: October 10, 2006
- Recorded: August 1982
- Genre: Soft rock, adult contemporary
- Length: 4:00
- Songwriter(s): Barry Gibb, Maurice Gibb

"Eyes That See in the Dark" was originally performed by Barry Gibb as a guideline for Kenny Rogers, months after Gibb recorded demos for Dionne Warwick in which Warwick herself recorded Heartbreaker which was produced by Gibb.

"Eyes That See in the Dark" was recorded in August 1982. This would be the first demo for an album by Rogers, as Gibb and Rogers met later in the year and Rogers asked about some songs. Gibb's version was a power ballad. On this version, Maurice plays second guitar, bass, and a bit of synthesizer.

=== Personnel ===
- Barry Gibb — lead vocals, guitar
- Maurice Gibb — guitar, bass, synthesizer
