= You and I (Kenny Rogers song) =

Song performed by Kenny Rogers

Song by Kenny Rogers

from the album Eyes That See in the Dark
- Released: August 30, 1983
- Recorded: May 1983
- Length: 4:34
- Label: RCA
- Songwriter: Barry, Robin & Maurice Gibb
- Producers: Barry Gibb, Albhy Galuten, Karl Richardson

"You and I" is a song written by Barry, Robin and Maurice Gibb and was recorded and performed by Kenny Rogers from his 1983 album Eyes That See in the Dark. Despite not being released as a single, it has been played on the radio, becoming one of Rogers' most popular songs, eventually becoming a number-one hit in Brazil in December 1983. Barry Gibb sings background vocals on the intro, chorus, interlude (between the first chorus and second verse). The performer of the song sometimes credited to 'Kenny Rogers and the Bee Gees' because Barry used his falsetto.

"You and I" was recorded around May 1983, the Boneroo Horns was heard on the song's outro.

== Personnel ==
- Kenny Rogers — vocals
- Barry Gibb — background vocals, guitar
- Maurice Gibb — guitar, bass, synthesizer
- Tim Renwick — guitar
- George Terry — guitar
- George Bitzer – piano, synthesizer
- Albhy Galuten — piano, synthesizer
- Ron Ziegler – drums
- Joe Lala — percussion
- Peter Graves — horns
- Whit Sidener – horns
- Ken Faulk – horns
- Neal Bonsanti – horns

== Weekly charts ==
Chart (1983)	Peak position
Brazil (ABPD)	1

== Barry Gibb version ==
"You and I"

Song by Barry Gibb

from the album The Eyes That See in the Dark Demos
- Released: October 10, 2006
- Recorded: January 1983
- Genre: Soft rock, adult contemporary
- Length: 4:25
- Songwriter: Barry, Robin & Maurice Gibb

Barry Gibb's original version of "You and I" was the second song intended for Kenny Rogers' new album. Gibb's version was recorded in January 1983 in Miami Beach, Florida with "This Woman" and "Midsummer Nights". This version was released officially in 2006, 23 years after Gibb finished this song. This song followed the style of Gibb's own version of "Eyes That See in the Dark". Like he does on Rogers' version, he sings background vocals on the intro, first chorus interlude (between the first chorus and second verse) and the second chorus. Gibb's version was released on The Eyes That See in the Dark Demos.

=== Personnel ===
- Barry Gibb – lead and background vocals, guitar
- Albhy Galuten – piano, synthesizer
