= Evening Star (Kenny Rogers song) =

1984 single by Kenny Rogers

Single by Kenny Rogers

from the album Eyes That See in the Dark
- B-side: "Midsummer Nights"
- Released: June 1984
- Recorded: May 1983
- Genre: Country
- Length: 3:37
- Label: RCA
- Songwriter(s): Barry Gibb, Maurice Gibb
- Producer(s): Gibb-Galuten-Richardson

Kenny Rogers singles chronology
"Eyes That See in the Dark" (1984)	"Evening Star" (1984)	"What About Me?" (1984)

"Evening Star"

Song by Barry Gibb

from the album The Eyes That See in the Dark Demos
- Released: October 10, 2006
- Recorded: April 1983
- Genre: Country
- Length: 4:00
- Songwriter(s): Barry Gibb, Maurice Gibb

"Evening Star" is a song written by Barry and Maurice Gibb, and recorded by American country music artist Kenny Rogers. It was released in June 1984 as the third single from the album Eyes That See in the Dark. The song reached No. 11 on the Billboard Hot Country Singles & Tracks chart.

This track, along with "Buried Treasure" have backing vocals by the Gatlin Brothers. No bass guitar is credited, but it appears to be the work of Maurice Gibb, judging by the match to the demos and the slap bass sound on this song.

== Personnel ==
- Kenny Rogers — vocals
- Barry Gibb – background vocals, guitar
- Maurice Gibb — guitar, bass, synthesizer
- Larry Gatlin — background vocals
- Steve Gatlin – background vocals
- Rudy Gatlin— background vocals
- Albhy Galuten — piano, synthesizer
- Fred Tackett — guitar
- Mitch Holder – guitar
- John Hobbs – piano
- Paul Leim — drums

== Chart performance ==
Chart (1984)	Peak position
US Hot Country Songs (Billboard)	11
Canadian RPM Country Tracks	14

== Barry Gibb version ==
Barry Gibb's original version of "Evening Star" was released on The Eyes That See in the Dark Demos in 2006. This song is a country singalong, with harmony vocals and Maurice Gibb contributing both a slap bass and a snappy lead guitar break. But on Kenny Rogers' version, the vocals would again be done by the Gatlin Brothers for release, and the break was eliminated.

=== Personnel ===
- Barry Gibb — lead and harmony vocals, guitar
- Maurice Gibb — guitar, bass, synthesizer
