= Face to Face (Barry Gibb and Olivia Newton-John song) =

Song by Barry Gibb and Olivia Newton-John

from the album Now Voyager
- Released: 1984
- Recorded: 1984 (Criteria Studios, Miami, Florida); May 1984 (Ocean Way, Los Angeles, California)
- Length: 4:17
- Label: Polydor, MCA
- Songwriters: Barry Gibb, Maurice Gibb, George Bitzer
- Producers: Barry Gibb, Karl Richardson

"Face to Face" is a ballad performed by British singers Barry Gibb and Olivia Newton-John. It was released as a promotional single from Gibb's 1984 album Now Voyager in Brazil, Germany, Philippines and Spain. It was also included on Newton-John's compilation Love Songs (2004, Japan exclusive). Face to Face was also included in Olivia Newton-John's 3-Disc CD reissue of Physical-2021 Remastered Deluxe Edition.

It is one of the two songs on the album along with "She Says" that was not featured on the 1984 film Now Voyager starring Gibb himself and Michael Hordern.

== Background ==
It was written by Gibb, along with Maurice Gibb and George Bitzer in 1983. The solo version of "Face to Face" was recorded by Gibb as a demo in late 1983 with his brother Maurice (guitar, bass, synthesizer) and Bitzer (piano, synthesizer) along with four other songs.

Newton-John also contributed background vocals on "Fine Line", a song also included on Gibb's Now Voyager.

== Critical reception ==
Allmusic critic William Ruhlmann called "Face to Face" as "a steamy ballad duet with Newton-John that wouldn't have been out of place on Guilty and might have a good single".
