= All the Love in the World (Dionne Warwick song) =

- Side A of the US single

Single by Dionne Warwick

from the album Heartbreaker
- B-side: "You Are My Love" (US); "It Makes No Difference" (UK)
- Released: November 1982
- Recorded: 1982; April to May 1982, Middle Ear, Miami Beach
- Genre: R&B
- Length: 3:25
- Label: Arista
- Songwriter: Barry, Robin & Maurice Gibb
- Producer: Gibb-Galuten-Richardson

Dionne Warwick singles chronology
"Take the Short Way Home" (1982)	"All the Love in the World" (1982)	"Yours" (1983)

"All the Love in the World" is a song by Dionne Warwick, released as a single in 1982. It was written by the Bee Gees (Barry, Robin, and Maurice Gibb), and was featured on Warwick's hit album Heartbreaker, produced by Barry Gibb, Karl Richardson, and Albhy Galuten. Barry Gibb provides backing vocals on the track. It was Warwick's third single from the album, behind "Heartbreaker" and "Take the Short Way Home". The song just missed the Billboard Hot 100 in the US (number 101), but charted at number 16 on the US Adult Contemporary chart and at number 10 on the UK Singles Chart.

== Chart performance ==
=== Weekly charts ===
Chart (1982–1983)	Peak position
Belgium (Ultratop 50 Flanders)	7
Germany (GfK)	50
Ireland (IRMA)	19
Luxembourg (Radio Luxembourg)	5
Netherlands (Dutch Top 40)	3
Netherlands (Single Top 100)	11
New Zealand (Recorded Music NZ)	23
UK Singles (Official Charts)	10
US Adult Contemporary (Billboard)	16
US Bubbling Under Hot 100 (Billboard)	1
Australia (Kent Music Report)	53

2025 weekly chart performance for "All the Love in the World"
Chart (2025)	Peak position
Jamaica Airplay (JAMMS)	2

=== Year-end charts ===
Chart (1983)	Position
Belgium (Ultratop Flanders)	66
Netherlands (Dutch Top 40)	46
Netherlands (Single Top 100)	96
