= Stay Alone =

Single by Barry Gibb

from the album Now Voyager
- A-side: "Fine Line"
- Released: October 1984
- Genre: Piano ballad
- Length: 3:49
- Label: MCA (US); Polydor
- Songwriters: Barry Gibb, George Bitzer
- Producers: Barry Gibb, Karl Richardson

"Stay Alone" is a ballad performed by Barry Gibb that appears on the album Now Voyager in September 1984. And later it was released as a B-side of "Fine Line" in October 1984. In Japan and Spain "One Night (For Lovers)" was chosen as the B-side of "Fine Line".

This song was written by Gibb and George Bitzer. This song was written in 1982 recorded by Gibb as a demo while he recorded some songs for Dionne Warwick in her album Heartbreaker. but was not used.

The song features Gibb's solo voice and piano only, with no backup vocals or drumming. Unlike the other songs from the album, it was a pure pop ballad. The video features actress Maryam D'Abo.

== Personnel ==
- Barry Gibb — vocals
- George Bitzer — keyboard
