= Greenfields (album) =

Studio album by Barry Gibb
- Released: 8 January 2021
- Studio: RCA Studio A (Nashville, Tennessee)
- Genre: Country
- Length: 44:05
- Label: Capitol; EMI
- Producer: Dave Cobb; Stephen Gibb

Barry Gibb chronology
In the Now (2016)	Greenfields (2021)

Singles from Greenfields
- 1. "Words of a Fool" Released: 6 November 2020; 2. "Words" Released: 2 January 2021

Greenfields: The Gibb Brothers Songbook, Vol. 1 is the third solo album by British singer-songwriter Barry Gibb, which was released on 8 January 2021 by Capitol Records in America and EMI Records internationally. The album features re-imaginings of songs written by the Bee Gees with country music singers. The album's title is taken from a lyric in the song "Butterfly".

At 74 years, 4 months and 17 days old, Gibb became the oldest artist to peak at number 1 on the Australian ARIA Albums Chart.

== Background ==
Gibb announced the album on 6 November 2020 with the release of "Words of a Fool". As a lifelong fan of country and bluegrass music, he sought a way to record some songs with some of the greatest names in the genre which eventually led to the creation of Greenfields. Gibb selected Dave Cobb as the album's producer after his son Stephen showed him a Chris Stapleton song, with Gibb recalling that "I freaked out and I said, "Wow, there are people making records like this now? There are still bands making records and not programming and that it's real?" I said, "Who is this?" And he said, [Chris Stapleton], and then he said, "Dave Cobb is the producer." I said, "I want to work with that guy. If I make any more records, it's with him." and he flew to Nashville to record. Gibb stated that "from the first day we stepped into RCA Studio A in Nashville (the very place where Elvis, Willie, Waylon, Roy, the Everly Brothers and so many other legends made their magic) the album took on a life of its own. I couldn't be more grateful for the opportunity to work with Dave and all the artists who stopped by. They were all incredibly generous with their time and talent. They inspired me more than words can express. I feel deep down that Maurice and Robin would have loved this album for different reasons. I wish we could have all been together to do it but I think we were."

The album's lead single "Words of a Fool" was originally for a 1986 Barry Gibb solo project that never wound up being released. Of his collaboration on the track, Jason Isbell enthused that Gibb "is one of the greatest songwriters and singers in popular music history, and I'm happy to say he still has that beautiful voice and that magical sense of melody. Working with him on this project has been one of the great honors of my career. He's a prince." "Butterfly", which features musical partners David Rawlings and Gillian Welch, was written when the Gibb brothers were living in Australia before they became household names and has been covered by the likes of Marmalade and Ronnie Burns.

Of re-interpreting his hits as country tracks, Gibb noted that "There were so many songs that were really written in the spirit of country music. “Islands in the Stream” for instance, was written for Diana Ross, but when I agreed to work with Kenny, he wanted to do a duet with Dolly. And so we suggested that one -- we knew it was good, we knew it was potentially very strong, but we didn't know it was a duet. So we just went to work on that, and the R&B song became a country song."

== Recording ==
During the recording process, Gibb sang live with the majority of the album's guest artists, with the exception of Brandi Carlile and Miranda Lambert. Gibb noted that "Brandi wanted to do "Run to Me" before I could get to Nashville. So she went ahead and recorded it with Dave, and then I put my vocal on that later" and added that "I didn't meet Miranda – she did it when I wasn't in the studio. I think some artists are like that. They go, "Well, I'll come in and sing, but I don't want anyone else there." I dealt with that with producing Diana Ross, where someone else being in the sound booth room was just not acceptable, you know? And I think even Dave's like that. He doesn't really like people being there that really don't have a reason to be there."

Gibb spoke highly of recording with Keith Urban, stating that "he's fantastic. I mean, he gave us a great gift because he brought Nicole with him, and that was such a thrill. I'm freaking out, you know. It's not really about anyone else being impressed by me or intimidated by me -- it's the other way around." Similarly, recording with Dolly Parton, whom Gibb had not seen in over 40 years, "was a great thrill, and as incredible as she always is. She's such a humble person" and noted that "Dolly told me that where she was standing at the microphone is exactly where she stood when she did "I Will Always Love You" and "Jolene." You know, that's mind blowing." Gibb also explained that Alison Krauss "was fantastic" and that Olivia Newton-John "was spot on from the first note. She hasn't been in the studio for awhile, she'd been out of action, and she was so thrilled to just get back to singing". The song was one of the last Newton-John recorded before her death in 2022.

== Critical reception ==
Professional ratings
Aggregate scores
Source	Rating
Metacritic	73/100
Review scores
Source	Rating
The Guardian	4/5 stars
The Irish Times	3/5 stars
musicOMH	3.5/5 stars
Uncut	4/5 stars

Greenfields was met with "generally favorable" reviews from critics. At Metacritic, which assigns a weighted average rating out of 100 to reviews from mainstream publications, this release received an average score of 73 based on 11 reviews.

In a 4/5 star review, Alexis Petridis of The Guardian summarised that "with subtle, beautiful arrangements, this foray into country-pop with covers by the likes of Dolly Parton, Jason Isbell and Gillian Welch is testament to the Bee Gees’ greatness". He noted that, upon first glance, Gibb recording a country album seems "peculiar" but adds that "you understand why Gibb might be keen to undertake the endeavor. The sheer wattage of Nashville star power in the supporting cast – everyone from Keith Urban and Alison Krauss to Gillian Welch and David Rawlings – underlines the regard the Gibb brothers are held in by their fellow musicians, which is never a bad thing." Petridis goes on to say that several of the more well-known tracks "can't help but be dulled by familiarity" and states that the cover of "Jive Talkin'" with Lambert and Buchanan "doesn't really work" but praises Krauss' vocal performance on "Too Much Heaven" for "casting the song's melodic richness in new light". Similarly he asserts that Carlile's performance on "Run to Me" indicates "underlines the fact that only in a catalogue as thick with hits as the Bee Gees would a ballad this strong be relatively overlooked". Sonically, he notes that "the arrangements here are subtly done and often beautiful, led by piano or acoustic guitar, the orchestrations muted; the pedal-steel-heavy "Words of a Fool" aside, they're closer to country-inflected pop than country per se. You wonder about the results had Gibb and Cobb stripped them back even more, or hauled them into grittier Americana territory". In conclusion, he praises Rawlings and Welch's appearance on "Butterfly" before stating that "titling this album Volume 1 suggests Greenfields represents more than a one-off experiment: for all its strengths, there's scope for Barry Gibb to develop this unlikely late-period diversion further."

In another positive review, Chris Willman of Variety explains that the album "pays tribute to [Gibb] and his late brothers' rich, melodic catalog, now freshly approached with a rootsy but cosmopolitan country vibe that feels as ingrained and intrinsic to the aged material as it sounds. Each lustrous song's theatrical and trembling tone, once heard in this new, folksy form, seem so instinctually right as a country cut that you'll nearly forget the disco and chamber-pop originals" and goes on to declare that "save for a few hiccups, the overall results of the "Greenfields" experiment are pretty magnificent, actually". Willman continues by praising the performances of Carlile, Isbell, Welch, Krauss and Gibb himself, who he describes as a "a weirdly stirring, breathy marvel" and concludes that the success of Volume 1 means Gibb new direction is "well worth a Volume 2. And 3".

== Track listing ==
All tracks written by Barry, Robin & Maurice Gibb. Except tracks 9 and 10 written by Barry & Robin Gibb, and tracks 2, 11 and 13 written by Barry Gibb.

Greenfields track listing
No.	Title	Duet partner(s)	Length
1.	"I've Gotta Get a Message to You"	Keith Urban	3:15
2.	"Words of a Fool"	Jason Isbell	3:48
3.	"Run to Me"	Brandi Carlile	3:22
4.	"Too Much Heaven"	Alison Krauss	3:40
5.	"Lonely Days"	Little Big Town	3:44
6.	"Words"	Dolly Parton	3:12
7.	"Jive Talkin'"	Miranda Lambert and Jay Buchanan	3:58
8.	"How Deep Is Your Love"	Tommy Emmanuel and Little Big Town	4:26
9.	"How Can You Mend a Broken Heart"	Sheryl Crow	3:26
10.	"To Love Somebody"	Jay Buchanan	3:35
11.	"Rest Your Love on Me"	Olivia Newton-John	4:02
12.	"Butterfly"	Gillian Welch and David Rawlings	3:43
Total length:			44:05

Japanese edition and Target exclusive edition bonus tracks
No.	Title	Duet partner(s)	Length
12.	"With the Sun in My Eyes"		3:30
13.	"Morning of My Life"		3:44
14.	"Butterfly"	Gillian Welch and David Rawlings	3:43
Total length:			51:28

== Personnel ==
These credits follow the track listing of the US Target and Japanese deluxe edition of the album.

Musicians

- Barry Gibb – vocals; acoustic guitar (9, 12, 14)
- Keith Urban – vocals and electric guitar (1)
- Jason Isbell – vocals (2), acoustic guitar (2, 4, 12, 13), slide guitar (2), electric guitar (3)
- Brandi Carlile – vocals (3)
- Alison Krauss – vocals (4)
- Jimi Westbrook – vocals (5, 8)
- Karen Fairchild – vocals (5, 8)
- Kimberly Schlapman – vocals (5, 8)
- Philip Sweet – vocals (5, 8)
- Dolly Parton – vocals (6)
- Miranda Lambert – vocals (7)
- Jay Buchanan – vocals (7, 10), handclaps (7)
- Sheryl Crow – vocals (9)
- Olivia Newton-John – vocals (11)
- Gillian Welch – vocals and acoustic guitar (14)
- Leroy Powell – electric guitar (1, 5, 6, 10, 11), handclaps (7)
- Dave Cobb – acoustic guitar (2, 3, 5, 6, 9–14), percussion (7), Mellotron (14), 12-string acoustic guitar (14)
- Tim Hanseroth – guitar (3)
- Elizabeth Lamb – 12-string acoustic guitar (7), viola (7)
- Tommy Emmanuel – acoustic guitar (8)
- David Rawlings – acoustic guitar (14)
- Brian Allen – bass
- Philip Towns – acoustic piano (1, 4–9, 11, 12, 13), organ (1, 2, 4–11), Mellotron (5, 14)
- Chris Powell – drums (1–5, 7–14), percussion (4, 8, 14), handclaps (5, 7)
- David Goodstein – drums (6)
- Robby Turner – pedal steel guitar (1)
- Paul Franklin – pedal steel guitar (5, 6, 12)
- Becky Fluke – handclaps (5)
- Stephen Gibb – handclaps (5)
- Toby Hulbert – handclaps (5, 7)
- Jay Landers – handclaps (5)

Horns and Strings

- Sam Levine – saxophones
- Roy Agee – trombone
- Mike Haynes and Steve Patrick – trumpets
- David Angell, Monisa Angell, Jenny Bifano, David Davidson, Conni Ellisor, Alicia Enstrom, and Mary Kathryn Vanosdale – violins
- Monisa Angell, Kevin Bate, Chris Farrell, Elizabeth Lamb, and Kristin Wilkinson – violas
- Kevin Bate, Anthony LaMarchina, Carole Rabinowitz, and Sarighani Reist – cellos
- Stephen Lamb – orchestra copyist
- Kristin Wilkinson – string conductor (14)

=== Production ===
- Barry Gibb – executive producer, liner notes
- Jay Landers – executive producer
- Dave Cobb – producer
- Stephen Gibb – associate producer
- John Merchant – additional vocal production, recording
- Darrell Thorp – recording
- Tom Elmhirst – mixing at Electric Lady Studios (New York City, New York)
- Brandon Bost – mix assistant
- Matt Scatchell – mix assistant
- Pete Lyman – mastering at Infrasonic Sound (Los Angeles, California)
- Daniel Bacigalupi – mastering assistant
- Andrew Brightman – A&R
- Dick Ashby – project coordinator
- Nicole Frantz – creative direction
- Katie Moore – design
- Becky Fluke – studio photography
- Zsolt Zsigmond – photography

== Charts ==
=== Weekly charts ===
Weekly chart performance for Greenfields
Chart (2021)	Peak position
Australian Albums (ARIA)	1
Belgian Albums (Ultratop Flanders)	35
Belgian Albums (Ultratop Wallonia)	150
Canadian Albums (Billboard)	66
Dutch Albums (Album Top 100)	15
German Albums (Offizielle Top 100)	4
Irish Albums (OCC)	18
New Zealand Albums (RMNZ)	13
Swiss Albums (Schweizer Hitparade)	8
UK Albums (OCC)	1
US Billboard 200	15
US Top Country Albums (Billboard)	3

=== Year-end charts ===
Year-end chart performance for Greenfields
Chart (2021)	Position
US Top Country Albums (Billboard)	81
