= All in Your Name =

Single by Barry Gibb and Michael Jackson
- Released: 25 June 2011
- Recorded: December 2002
- Studio: Middle Ear (Miami Beach, Florida)
- Genre: Pop
- Length: 5:37
- Songwriters: Barry Gibb; Michael Jackson
- Producers: Barry Gibb; John Merchant

Barry Gibb singles chronology
"Drown On the River" (2007)	"All in Your Name" (2011)	"Grey Ghost" (2011)

Michael Jackson singles chronology
"Behind the Mask" (2011)	"All in Your Name" (2011)	"(I Like) The Way You Love Me" (2011)

"All in Your Name" is a song written and performed by Barry Gibb and Michael Jackson. It was recorded in 2002, and released on 25 June 2011, the second anniversary of Jackson's death in 2009.

== Writing and background ==
Billboard reported on 20 December 2002 that Gibb wrote a song with Jackson recently in protest of the United States government's plan to invade Iraq (which took place in March 2003). There are rumors that Jackson showed up one day with a partly written song and talked Gibb into contributing to it. The date was probably in the summer of 2002. A fan said that Gibb has a demo recording of it, but Gibb himself would not confirm that any of this happened.

Gibb explains:

Michael Jackson and I were the dearest of friends, that's simply what it was. We gravitated towards the same kind of music and we loved collaborating and he was the easiest person to write with. The more we got to know each other the more those ideas entwined and it all came to this song 'All in Your Name'. 'All in Your Name' is in fact the message that Michael wanted to send out to all of his fans all over the world that he did it all for them and for the pure love of music. I hope and pray that we all get to hear it in its entirety. This experience I will treasure forever.

== Release ==
Barry Gibb sings lead vocals for much of the song, with short sections performed by Michael Jackson. The cover of the single featured Gibb and Jackson in the recording studio in 1985, when they were jointly producing Diana Ross' song "Eaten Alive".

The creative process for the song was recorded and eventually edited into a music video, released on Gibb's website after the release of the song.

== Personnel ==
- Barry Gibb – lead vocal, guitar
- Michael Jackson – lead vocal, percussion
- Steve Rucker – drums
- Matt Bonelli – bass
- Alan Kendall – guitar
- Hal Roland and Doug Emery – keyboards
- Recorded at Middle Ear Studios, Miami Beach, Florida
- Recorded by John Merchant, assisted by Ashley Gibb
- Produced by Barry Gibb and John Merchant
