= Underworld (song) =

Single by Barry Gibb

from the album Arctic Tale
- Released: August 2006
- Recorded: August or September 2004
- Genre: Dance-pop
- Length: 4:40
- Songwriters: Barry Gibb, Ashley Gibb
- Producer: Barry Gibb

Barry Gibb singles chronology
| "Doctor Mann" (2006) | "Underworld" (2006) | "Drown On the River" (2007) |

"Underworld" is a song recorded by Barry Gibb. It was released in August 2006 on iTunes and later included on the film soundtrack of Arctic Tale. This track and Doctor Mann were both released in August 2006 under 'Barry Gibb Alan' (Barry's full name is Barry Alan Crompton Gibb); both songs had been played a couple of months earlier on Barry's official website's 'Barry Gibb Radio'; the correct spelling was later changed to 'Barry Gibb'.

It was written by Barry and Ashley Gibb in 2004, and recorded by Barry in August or September 2004 in Middle Ear Studios, Miami Beach, Florida, same session as "Doctor Mann" and the unreleased "Starcrossed Lovers" both songs were also written by Barry and Ashley Gibb and engineered by Brian Tench. The first CD released of "Underworld" was on the film soundtrack of Arctic Tale with songs by various artists including Brian Wilson and Aimee Mann. But this track is not featured on the film so its inclusion appears to be the result of a business deal.

Musician Steve Gibb contributed guitar on this track while Eero Turunen plays keyboards and programming.

== Personnel ==
- Barry Gibb — vocals, guitar
- Steve Gibb — guitar
- Eero Turunen – keyboard, programming
- Brian Tench — engineer
