= Ben Stivers =

American musician (born 1968)

- Born: May 23, 1968 (age 57); Indiana, United States
- Genres: Jazz, soul, Americana, blues rock, latino
- Occupations: Musician, record producer, music director
- Instruments: Keyboards, piano, drums, organ, percussion
- Years active: 1986–present
- Website: benstiversmusic.com

Ben Stivers is an American musician. Stivers records, tours, and collaborates with artists across multiple genres, including jazz, blues, rock, pop, Latin pop, and jazz fusion. In June 2019, Stivers joined Lyle Lovett and His Large Band on their US tour, playing piano and keyboards.

== Early life ==
Stivers was born in Indiana but his family moved to Las Vegas when he was four to pursue musical careers. His father was the bandleader at UNLV and his mother was a professional violin player. Stivers was a devoted classical piano student and earned recognition as a finalist in the prestigious Arnold Bullock National Piano Competition at age 16. While attending Chaparral High School (Paradise, Nevada), he took an interest in jazz fusion bands such as the Yellowjackets and Weather Report that drew him to synthesizers and groove.

== Miami ==
Stivers moved to Miami in 1986 to pursue a degree in Studio Music and Jazz at the University of Miami Frost School of Music under Vince Maggio.

In Miami he worked with numerous high-profile artists such as Gloria Estefan, Ricky Martin, Chayanne, Exposé, Jon Secada, Julio Iglesias, Emilio Estefan, Dan Warner, Matchbox 20 and many others.

A highlight of his Miami years was his collaboration with the Gibb family. He has toured and collaborated with Barry Gibb since the early 90s and he played piano and keyboards with the Bee Gees. He played on the Bee Gees records This Is Where I Came In and One Night Only.

== Mallorca ==
Stivers moved to Spain in the late 90s to pursue a full-time jazz residency project in Mallorca.

== New York City ==
In 2001 Stivers moved to New York City, where he played with musicians such as Teddy Kumpel, Kenny Rampton, Rez Abbasi, Donny McCaslin, Groove Collective and many others. He subsequently founded the Ben Stivers Organ Trio.

In addition to his jazz piano and organ work, Stivers collaborates with many singer/songwriters, dance studios, producers and performers. Some of his collaborations include Scott Sharrard, Tony Scherr, James Maddock, Dana Fuchs, Erik Blicker, Jason Darling, Kate Chaston, Christine Courtin and others.

In 2019 Ben joined Lyle Lovett and His Large Band on their US tour. In 2017–2018, Stivers was a member of the Chris Botti Band. Other tours include the Barry Gibb Mythology Tour, Rez Abbasi, Gregg Allman Band, and others.

== Discography ==
- 1991 Extra Strength, Active Ingredient
- 1992 Exposé, Exposé
- 1994 On a Ride, Prince Rahiem
- 1995 Let 'Em Roll, Loaded Dice
- 1996 Armageddon, Mission Control
- 1996 Trilogia, Trilogia
- 1998 Señor Bolero, José Feliciano
- 1998 One Night Only, Bee Gees
- 2000 VH1 Storytellers, Bee Gees
- 2001 This Is Where I Came In, Bee Gees
- 2002 Shallow Breath, Marcus Wolf
- 2003 Deluxe, Ron Sunshine
- 2006 No Vacancy, Jake Stigers
- 2006 Kazually Speaking, Kazual
- 2006 Five O'Clock News, Ryan Scott
- 2006 MTV Unplugged, Ricky Martin
- 2007 Black and White Tour, Ricky Martin
- 2007 Ricky Martin... Live Black & White Tour, Ricky Martin
- 2009 Far from Home: A Tribute to European Song, Beat Kaestli
- 2009 What Does It Take?, Nell Bryden
- 2010 Mirror, Marcus Wolf
- 2012 Scott Sharrard & the Brickyard Band, Scott Sharrard
- 2013 Moon over Babylon, Kenny Rampton
- 2014 Heart of Memphis, Robin McKelle & the Flytones
- 2015 Gregg Allman Live: Back to Macon GA, Gregg Allman
- 2016 Behind the Vibration, Rez Abbasi
- 2016 In the Now, Barry Gibb
- 2017 The Green, James Maddock
