= Shine, Shine =

Single by Barry Gibb

from the album Now Voyager
- B-side: "She Says"
- Released: August 1984
- Genre: Synthpop, adult contemporary
- Length: 4:43
- Label: MCA (US); Polydor
- Songwriters: Barry Gibb, Maurice Gibb, George Bitzer
- Producers: Barry Gibb, Karl Richardson

Barry Gibb singles chronology
"What Kind of Fool" (1981)	"Shine, Shine" (1984)	"Fine Line" (1984)

"Shine, Shine" is a song recorded and released by Barry Gibb. The first single from his debut solo album Now Voyager, it proved to be another hit single for Gibb, as he had previously released the US Top 10 singles "Guilty" and "What Kind of Fool", on both of which he had collaborated with Barbra Streisand. "Shine, Shine," however, was his first entirely solo hit single.

== Background ==
The selection was written and composed by Gibb, his brother Maurice, and George Bitzer. The song has a fast percussion beat and a relatively straight melody line. Though the date, in 1984, of its recording in Middle Ear Studios was undocumented as of late April 2015, it employed string arrangements which were added later in Ocean Way Studios, Los Angeles. Gibb also sings background and harmony vocals and played acoustic guitar on this track.

As its music video implies, the selection's lyrics are about a man who is watching a woman he loves marry someone else.

== Release and reception ==
"Shine, Shine" was chosen as the first single to be released from Now Voyager, with "She Says" chosen as the B-side. The song was charted in North America, Canada, UK and on other European countries. The song was released on PolyGram Records in Portugal. MCA also released a 12-inch single, but with the same versions of two songs. The extended version of this single was released only in the UK. The horn section is featured in the instrumental break and on the coda of the song. The cover photograph for the single was shot by Annie Leibovitz.

William Ruhlmann, at Allmusic, retrospectively described the song as "having an engaging chorus and Caribbean riff." Rolling Stone described "Shine, Shine" as having a "new wave synth-pop bounce, a hopped-up reggae beat."

== Charts ==
Chart (1984)	Peak position
Australia (Kent Music Report)	87
Belgium (Ultratop Flanders)	29
Canada Adult Contemporary Charts (RPM)	5
Canada Top Singles (RPM)	53
Germany (Media Control Charts)	45
Italy (FIMI)	23
Netherlands (Dutch Top 40)	32
UK (Official Charts Company)	95
US Billboard Hot 100	37
US Billboard Adult Contemporary	8
US Cash Box	39
US Radio & Records	38
