= Eyes That See in the Dark =

Studio album by Kenny Rogers
- Released: August 22, 1983
- Recorded: May 1983
- Studios: Middle Ear (Miami); Lion Share (Los Angeles); Ocean Way (Hollywood)
- Genres: Country; soft rock
- Length: 39:56
- Label: RCA Victor
- Producer: Gibb-Galuten-Richardson

Kenny Rogers chronology
| 20 Greatest Hits (1983) | Eyes That See in the Dark (1983) | What About Me? (1984) |

Singles from Eyes That See in the Dark
- 1. "Islands in the Stream" Released: August 15, 1983; 2. "This Woman" Released: January 9, 1984; 3. "Eyes That See in the Dark" Released: April 2, 1984; 4. "Evening Star" Released: June 4, 1984

Professional ratings
Review scores
| Source | Rating |
|---|---|
| AllMusic | 4.5/5 stars |

Eyes That See in the Dark is the fifteenth studio album by American country singer Kenny Rogers, released by RCA Records in August 1983.

== Background ==
Eyes That See in the Dark marks Barry Gibb's third production project of the 1980s outside of the Bee Gees. Gibb wrote most of the songs that were more reminiscent of Rogers's days with the First Edition.

Just after Barry Gibb contributed to producing Dionne Warwick's Heartbreaker album, he and Rogers met later in the year and it was then that Rogers asked about some songs, and one of those songs was the title track. The other songs in this album were written in late 1982 and recorded in early 1983. Gibb recorded demos for Rogers while working with the Bee Gees for the 1983 film Staying Alive until April 1983, as Rogers started to record this album in May the same year.

The album, Rogers's first for RCA Nashville, was issued while his previous effort on Liberty Records We've Got Tonight was still in the charts and had to compete with singles from that still being issued by his previous label.

=== Recording ===
The finished instrumental tracks were dubbed onto the demos, and some of the guitar, bass, and synthesizer on the demos are heard in the completed mix. Ron Ziegler had to dub drums exactly in time with the drum machine used on the demos. Some of the musicians had also played on all of Andy Gibb's albums: Tim Renwick, George Terry, and Ron Ziegler. Barry and Maurice Gibb with Albhy Galuten appear both from the demo tracks and new recordings. "Islands in the Stream" was not a duet, and Rogers was not happy with the recording. Only after Dolly Parton was brought in and recorded the song as a duet did it take off.

The producers at the vocal dub sessions were surprised by Rogers's laid-back approach. He had kept the song demos in his possession for a period of time, but still needed to read lyric sheets while singing. He also, in Galuten's opinion, was just copying Barry's vocals instead of making the songs his own, a comment for which Galuten was banished from the rest of the vocal dub sessions. Kenny recalls it differently, that the producers urged him to sing them like Barry. At any rate, his vocals do follow Barry's closely.

The Gatlin Brothers contributed background vocals on "Buried Treasure" and "Evening Star", though Barry and Maurice Gibb's backing vocals can be heard, as the demo was mixed into the final version. The three members of the Bee Gees: Barry, Robin & Maurice Gibb did the same on "Living with You".

=== Release ===
"Islands in the Stream" became a major hit, reaching #1 on the Billboard pop, country and adult contemporary charts. It turned out to be the #1 country chart song of 1983.

Elsewhere on the album are "Buried Treasure", a single which was a top 3 country hit; the track "This Woman", which reached the top 20 on both the Billboard pop and country charts; and the title cut, "Eyes That See in the Dark", which charted on the UK Singles Chart, spending six weeks in the top 100.

Copyright of this album later passed to Kenny Rogers's self-owned label Dreamcatcher Records, and was licensed to Castle/Sanctuary. Under that license, this album was reissued on CD in Brazil. Copyright is currently owned by Capitol Records Nashville, which released it digitally; this version omits "Islands in the Stream", the most successful single from this album, for which copyright is still owned by Sony Music, current owner of RCA Records. Universal Music Group, owner of Capitol Records, did not obtain a license from Sony Music to include this song on that release, though this track can be purchased as a single track independent of the album (it mostly appears in compilations of Dolly Parton songs from Sony Music).

== Track listing ==
- All tracks were written by Barry, Robin & Maurice Gibb except where noted.

Side one
| No. | Title | Writer(s) | Length |
|---|---|---|---|
| 1. | "This Woman" | Barry Gibb, Albhy Galuten | 3:58 |
| 2. | "You and I" | | 4:37 |
| 3. | "Buried Treasure" | | 4:12 |
| 4. | "Islands in the Stream" (duet with Dolly Parton) | | 4:10 |
| 5. | "Living with You" | | 3:10 |

Side two
| No. | Title | Writer(s) | Length |
|---|---|---|---|
| 6. | "Evening Star" | B. Gibb, Maurice Gibb | 3:40 |
| 7. | "Hold Me" | | 4:15 |
| 8. | "Midsummer Nights" | B. Gibb, Albhy Galuten | 3:50 |
| 9. | "I Will Always Love You" | B. Gibb, M. Gibb | 4:22 |
| 10. | "Eyes That See in the Dark" | B. Gibb, M. Gibb | 3:42 |

== Notes ==
The song "I Will Always Love You" featured on this album was written by Barry and Maurice Gibb, and is not the same as the more famous song of the same name, which was written by Dolly Parton. Kenny Rogers would later record a rendition of the Dolly Parton song, for his 1996 covers album Vote for Love.

The song "Buried Treasure" is not to be confused with Rogers's 1978 song "Buried Treasures", which appears on his album Love or Something Like It. "Buried Treasures" had not been released as a single.

== Personnel ==
- Kenny Rogers – vocals
- Albhy Galuten – synthesizers, acoustic piano (1–5, 7–10), electric piano (1–5, 7–10), horn arrangements (2, 4, 7), string arrangements (3, 6), string conductor (3, 6)
- George Bitzer – synthesizers, acoustic piano (1–5, 7–10), electric piano (1–5, 7–10)
- John Hobbs – acoustic piano (6)
- Maurice Gibb – synthesizers, acoustic guitar, bass, backing vocals (5)
- Barry Gibb – acoustic guitar, backing vocals (1-8, 10), horn arrangements (2, 4, 7), string arrangements (3)
- Tim Renwick – electric guitar (1–5, 7–10)
- George Terry – acoustic guitar (1–5, 7–10), electric guitar (1–5, 7–10)
- Mitch Holder – electric guitar (6)
- Fred Tackett – electric guitar (6)
- Larry McNeely – banjo
- Ron Ziegler – drums (1–5, 7–10)
- Paul Leim – drums (6)
- Joe Lala – percussion
- Neal Bonsanti – saxophones (2, 4, 7)
- Whit Sidener – saxophones (2, 4, 7)
- Peter Graves – trombone (2, 4, 7), Boneroo Horns leader (2, 4, 7)
- Ken Faulk – trumpet (2, 4, 7)
- Jimmie Haskell – string arrangements and conductor (7)
- Sid Sharp – concertmaster (3, 6)
- Denise Decaro – backing vocals (1, 2, 4, 7, 9, 10), vocal contractor (1, 2, 4, 7, 9, 10)
- Myrna Mathews – backing vocals (1, 2, 4, 7, 9, 10)
- Marti McCall – backing vocals (1, 2, 4, 7, 9, 10)
- Larry Gatlin – backing vocals (3, 6)
- Rudy Gatlin – backing vocals (3, 6)
- Steve Gatlin – backing vocals (3, 6)
- Dolly Parton – vocals (4)
- Robin Gibb – backing vocals (5)

== Production ==
- Barry Gibb – producer
- Albhy Galuten – producer
- Karl Richardson – producer, engineer
- Steve Klein – engineer
- David Egerton – assistant engineer
- Tom Fouce – assistant engineer
- Neal Kent – assistant engineer
- Al Schmitt – assistant engineer
- Samii Taylor – assistant engineer
- Larry Janus – technical supervision
- Dale Peterson – technical supervision
- Mike Fuller – mastering at Criteria Studios (Miami, Florida)
- John Coulter – art direction
- Greg Gorman – front cover photography, photo concepts
- Steve Schapiro – back cover photography
- David Jacobsen – photo concepts
- Robert Norin – make-up
- Bonnie Tobias – transport
- Pete Wagner – transport
- Ken Kragen – management

Project coordinators

- Nancy Barney and Randy Kessler (Kenny Rogers)
- Marge Meoli (RCA)
- Peggy Needleman (Lion Share Studios)
- Dick Ashby, Eddie Choran, Tom Kennedy and Scott Sands (Middle Ear Studios)
- Michael Branch and Sandie Campbell (Kragen & Company)

== Charts ==
=== Weekly charts ===
Weekly chart performance for Eyes That See in the Dark
| Chart (1983–84) | Peak position |
|---|---|
| Australian Albums (Kent Music Report) | 6 |
| Austrian Albums (Ö3 Austria) | 9 |
| Canada Top Albums/CDs (RPM) | 5 |
| Dutch Albums (Album Top 100) | 13 |
| New Zealand Albums (RMNZ) | 2 |
| Norwegian Albums (VG-lista) | 2 |
| Swedish Albums (Sverigetopplistan) | 4 |
| Swiss Albums (Schweizer Hitparade) | 14 |
| UK Albums (Official Charts) | 53 |
| US Billboard 200 | 6 |
| US Top Country Albums (Billboard) | 1 |

=== Year-end charts ===
Year-end chart performance for Eyes That See in the Dark
| Chart (1983) | Position |
|---|---|
| Canada Top Albums/CDs (RPM) | 30 |
| Dutch Albums (Album Top 100) | 60 |
| Chart (1984) | Position |
| Canada Top Albums/CDs (RPM) | 55 |
| New Zealand Albums (RMNZ) | 38 |
| US Billboard 200 | 44 |
| US Top Country Albums (Billboard) | 9 |

== Certifications ==
Certifications for Eyes That See in the Dark
| Region | Certification | Certified units/sales |
|---|---|---|
| Australia (ARIA) | Platinum | 70,000^{^} |
| Canada (Music Canada) | 4× Platinum | 400,000^{^} |
| New Zealand (RMNZ) | Platinum | 15,000^{^} |
| United States (RIAA) | 2× Platinum | 2,000,000^{^} |
^{^} Shipments figures based on certification alone.

== The Eyes That See in the Dark Demos ==
Barry Gibb originally recorded the songs for Kenny Rogers on his album, the songs recorded from August 1982 to January–April 1983. Gibb's version of the songs was released officially in October 2006 on iTunes.
