= In the Now =

Studio album by Barry Gibb
- Released: 7 October 2016
- Studio: Hit Factory Criteria (Miami, Florida); Megawatt Recording (Los Angeles, California).
- Genre: Rock; country
- Label: Columbia
- Producer: Barry Gibb; John Merchant

Barry Gibb chronology
The Eaten Alive Demos (2006)	In the Now (2016)	Greenfields (2021)

In the Now is the second solo album by British singer-songwriter Barry Gibb, released on 7 October 2016 by Columbia Records. Although his second solo album (since 1984's Now Voyager), it is the first of all new material since the Bee Gees' final studio album This Is Where I Came In (2001). Gibb said of the album: "This is a dream come true for me. It's a new chapter in my life. I always hoped one day that the Bee Gees would be with Columbia or indeed Sony so, it's a great joy for me to start again this way with such great people."

The album was made available for pre-order on 12 August 2016 with the track "In the Now" as an "instant grat".

== Background ==
Following the deaths of his brothers Andy Gibb in 1988, Maurice Gibb in 2003 and Robin Gibb in 2012, respectively, Barry Gibb thought his music career was over: "I was ready to quit. I was done. There was no point in going on any further. I’ve done solo work my whole life but never felt like a solo artist." Gibb said he "gave up for a long time" until he became interested in writing songs again. The album was written with his sons Stephen and Ashley Gibb, which according to Barry Gibb meant "there was this huge personal thing going on between the three of us for the whole of this album" and "that you could say whatever it is you’ve got to say and be as honest as you can".

Barry Gibb initially planned on recording a country album citing bluegrass music as an inspiration, but he was told by his record company that "they’d have a lot of trouble getting me on country radio". Instead, the album evolved into "classic pop" inspired by Carole King and Bruce Springsteen. Gibb has said of In the Now: "The album is my opinion of life, my feelings and my journey with my brothers, and without my brothers, with my parents and without my parents, and with my own family, seeing my kids have their own kids."

== Track listing ==
All tracks are written by Barry Gibb, Stephen Gibb and Ashley Gibb.

No.	Title	Length
1.	"In the Now"	4:51
2.	"Grand Illusion"	4:40
3.	"Star Crossed Lovers"	3:18
4.	"Blowin' a Fuse"	4:44
5.	"Home Truth Song"	5:07
6.	"Meaning of the Word"	4:31
7.	"Cross to Bear"	6:00
8.	"Shadows"	4:33
9.	"Amy in Colour"	4:26
10.	"The Long Goodbye"	2:38
11.	"Diamonds"	5:17
12.	"End of the Rainbow"	4:09

CD deluxe edition (bonus tracks)
No.	Title	Length
13.	"Grey Ghost"	4:23
14.	"Daddy's Little Girl"	3:14
15.	"Soldier's Son"	2:58

== Personnel ==
- Barry Gibb – vocals, guitars
- Doug Emery – keyboards, musical director, programming (13–15)
- Ben Stivers – keyboards (1–12)
- Stephen Gibb – guitars (1–13), additional vocals (13)
- Dan Warner – guitars (1–12, 14, 15)
- Greg Leisz – pedal steel guitar (12)
- Alan Kendall – pedal steel guitar (14)
- Julio Hernandez – bass (1–12, 14)
- Lee Levin – drums, percussion (1–12)
- Richard Bravo – percussion (1–13)

Horn and String sections

- Doug Emery – arrangements
- Alfredo Olivia – string concertmaster
- Ed Maina – baritone saxophone
- Ed Calle – soprano saxophone, tenor saxophone
- John Kricker – trombone
- Jim Hacker and Doug Michels – trumpet
- Eric Kerley – French horn (10)
- David Cole and Claudio Jaffe – cello
- Anthony Parce, Chauncey Patterson and Scott O'Donnell – viola
- Huifang Chen, Monica Cheveresan, Carol Cole, Tomas Cotik, Scott Flavin, Valentin Mansurov, Alfredo Olivia, Evija Ozolins and Mark Schuppener – violin

=== Production ===
- Barry Gibb – producer
- John Merchant – producer (1–12), recording (1–12)
- Ethan Carson – recording (13–15)
- Matt LePlant – recording (13–15)
- Sam Bohl – recording assistant (1–12)
- Femio Hernandez – recording assistant (1–12)
- John Paterno – pedal steel recording (12)
- Mick Guzauski – mixing at Barking Dog Studios (Los Angeles, California)
- Bob Ludwig – mastering at Gateway Mastering (Portland, Maine)
- Joe Lizano – audio technician
- Carlos R. Guzman – drum and percussion technician
- Lazaro Rodriguez – guitar technician
- Dick Ashby – project coordinator
- Danny Clinch – photography
- Dave Bett – art direction

== Charts ==
=== Weekly charts ===
Chart (2016)	Peak position
Australian Albums (ARIA)	3
Austrian Albums (Ö3 Austria)	15
Belgian Albums (Ultratop Flanders)	27
Belgian Albums (Ultratop Wallonia)	55
Canadian Albums (Billboard)	89
Dutch Albums (Album Top 100)	12
French Albums (SNEP)	113
German Albums (Offizielle Top 100)	12
Irish Albums (IRMA)	73
Italian Albums (FIMI)	42
New Zealand Albums (RMNZ)	2
Scottish Albums (OCC)	5
Spanish Albums (PROMUSICAE)	51
Swiss Albums (Schweizer Hitparade)	22
UK Albums (OCC)	2
UK Album Downloads (OCC)	15
US Billboard 200	63

=== Year-end charts ===
Chart (2016)	Position
Australian Albums (ARIA)	72
