= Heartbreaker (Dionne Warwick song) =

1982 single by Dionne Warwick

Single by Dionne Warwick

from the album Heartbreaker
- B-side: "I Can't See Anything (But You)"
- Released: September 1982
- Studio: Middle Ear, Miami; Mediasound, New York City
- Length: 4:16
- Label: Arista
- Songwriters: Barry Gibb; Robin Gibb; Maurice Gibb
- Producer: Gibb-Galuten-Richardson

Dionne Warwick singles chronology
"For You" (1982)	"Heartbreaker" (1982)	"Take the Short Way Home" (1983)

"Heartbreaker" is a song performed by American singer Dionne Warwick. It was written by Barry, Robin and Maurice Gibb of the Bee Gees for her 1982 studio album of the same name, and production was done by Barry Gibb, Albhy Galuten, and Karl Richardson under their production name Gibb-Galuten-Richardson. Barry Gibb's backing vocal is heard on the chorus.

The song hit the top 10 in over a dozen countries and stands as one of Warwick's big career hits, selling an estimated 4 million singles worldwide. In the U.S., it reached number 10 on the Billboard Hot 100 chart in January 1983. The track was Warwick's eighth number one Adult Contemporary hit and reached number 14 on the Hot Black Singles chart. It was ranked as Billboard magazine's 80th-biggest US hit of 1983. On the UK Singles Chart, the track reached number 2 in November 1982.

== Background ==
"Heartbreaker" was written by Barry, Robin, and Maurice Gibb of the Bee Gees as the title track for singer Dionne Warwick's album of the same name. The demo version, sung by Barry Gibb, was not released until 2006 when it appeared on The Heartbreaker Demos (2006), the demo tracks that formed the basis for Warwick's album.

Warwick admitted in The Billboard Book of Number One Adult Contemporary Hits by Wesley Hyatt that she was not fond of "Heartbreaker" (regarding the song's international popularity, she said "I cried all the way to the bank"), but recorded it because she trusted Barry's judgment that it would be a hit. Maurice Gibb, who co-wrote the song, said"I cried my eyes out after we wrote it. I drove home and thought 'We should be doing this one', and when she did it, it was brilliant. Barry sang on it, and it became a duet between Barry and Dionne Warwick".

== Track listings ==
All tracks produced by Gibb-Galuten-Richardson.

7-inch single
No.	Title	Writer(s)	Length
1.	"Heartbreaker"	Barry Gibb; Robin Gibb; Maurice Gibb	4:16
2.	"I Can't See Anything (But You)"	Barry Gibb; Albhy Galuten; Maurice Gibb	3:24

== Charts ==
=== Weekly charts ===
Chart (1982–1983)	Peak position
Australia (Kent Music Report)	2
Austria (Ö3 Austria Top 40)	10
Belgium (Ultratop 50 Flanders)	3
Canada Top Singles (RPM)	15
Denmark (Hitlisten)	2
Finland (Suomen virallinen lista)	3
France (IFOP)	17
Ireland (IRMA)	2
Italy (Musica e dischi)	24
Luxembourg (Radio Luxembourg)	1
Netherlands (Dutch Top 40)	5
Netherlands (Single Top 100)	5
New Zealand (Recorded Music NZ)	4
Norway (VG-lista)	2
Portugal (AFP)	1
South Africa (Springbok)	4
Spain (AFYVE)	3
Sweden (Sverigetopplistan)	1
Switzerland (Schweizer Hitparade)	4
UK Singles (Official Charts)	2
US Billboard Hot 100	10
US Hot R&B/Hip-Hop Songs (Billboard)	14
US Adult Contemporary (Billboard)	1
US Cash Box Top 100	15
West Germany (GfK)	10
Zimbabwe (ZIMA)	3

2025 weekly chart performance for "Heartbreaker"
Chart (2025)	Peak position
Jamaica Airplay (JAMMS)	9

=== Year-end charts ===
Chart (1982)	Rank
Belgium (Ultratop 50 Flanders)	40
Denmark (Hitlisten)	27
Netherlands (Dutch Top 40)	66
Netherlands (Single Top 100)	65
UK Singles (BMRB)	18
US Cash Box Top 100	94

Chart (1983)	Rank
Australia (Kent Music Report)	18
US Billboard Hot 100	80
West Germany (Official German Charts)	35

== Other notable versions ==
The Bee Gees' own version, with Barry Gibb on lead vocals, was recorded in 1994. It was originally planned for an album called Love Songs to be released in 1995, but was eventually released in 2001 on Their Greatest Hits: The Record. A live version was released in 1998 on the live album One Night Only.

In 2005, German duo Blue Lagoon covered "Heartbreaker" and their version, produced by Felix J. Gauder, was released as a single, and later included on their 2007 album Sentimental Fools. The single was a top-25 hit in Germany and Austria and a top-60 hit in Sweden and Switzerland.

== See also ==
- List of number-one singles and albums in Sweden
- List of Billboard Adult Contemporary number ones of 1982
