= Buried Treasure (song) =

1984 single by Kenny Rogers

Single by Kenny Rogers

from the album Eyes That See in the Dark
- A-side: "This Woman"
- Released: January 1984
- Recorded: May 1983
- Studio: Middle Ear, Miami Beach; Lion Share, Hollywood; Ocean Way, Hollywood
- Genre: Country, roots rock
- Length: 4:12
- Label: RCA
- Songwriter(s): Barry, Robin & Maurice Gibb
- Producer(s): Gibb-Galuten-Richardson

Kenny Rogers singles chronology
"This Woman" (1984)	"Buried Treasure" (1984)	"Eyes That See in the Dark" (1984)

"Buried Treasure"

Song by Barry Gibb

from the album The Eyes That See in the Dark
- Released: November 2006
- Recorded: February 1983
- Genre: Country, country rock, roots rock
- Length: 3:55
- Songwriter(s): Barry, Robin & Maurice Gibb

"Buried Treasure" is a song written by Barry, Robin & Maurice Gibb, and recorded by American country music artist Kenny Rogers. It was released as the B-side of "This Woman" in January 1984 as the third single from the album Eyes That See in the Dark. The song reached No. 3 on the Billboard Hot Country Singles & Tracks chart and No. 2 on the Canadian RPM Country Tracks chart.

== Personnel 1 ==
- Kenny Rogers - vocals
- Barry Gibb - guitar, arranger
- Maurice Gibb - guitar, bass, synthesizer
- Tim Renwick - guitar
- George Terry - guitar
- George Bitzer - piano, synthesizer
- Albhy Galuten - piano, synthesizer, arranger
- Ron Ziegler - drums
- Joe Lala - percussion
- The Gatlin Brothers - vocals

== Barry Gibb version ==
Barry Gibb's version of "Buried Treasure" was a guideline for Rogers' album Eyes That See in the Dark released in 1983, this version was not released until 2006.

This song is a country singalong along the lines of the songs Barry and Maurice had done before, and Maurice appears to be singing the harmony done by The Gatlin Brothers on the completed recording. Gibb's version was recorded around February along with four songs also intended for Rogers' album "Hold Me", "Living with You" and "Islands in the Stream".

=== Personnel ===
- Barry Gibb - vocals, guitar
- Albhy Galuten - piano, synthesizer
