= The Eaten Alive Demos =

Demo album by Barry Gibb
- Released: 10 October 2006
- Recorded: March 1985
- Studio: Criteria (Miami)
- Genre: Pop, R&B, soul
- Length: 31:03

Barry Gibb demo albums chronology
The Eyes That See in the Dark Demos (2006)	The Eaten Alive Demos (2006)	In the Now (2016)

The Eaten Alive Demos is an album of demos written and produced by Barry Gibb for Diana Ross' 1985 album Eaten Alive, made available as downloads on iTunes in October 2006. The album contained most of the songs with the exception of the title track and "Chain Reaction". In the spring of 2009, when iTunes changed into DRM-free downloads with higher bit-rates; all of the Barry Gibb demos were no longer available. In August 2011 all of the Barry Gibb demos reappeared on iTunes shortly after the opening of the download store on his official website where many of the same tracks were available. Another demo of the title track by Michael Jackson is known to have been recorded, but, to this date, has not yet surfaced.

In 1985, Gibb teamed with Albhy Galuten and Karl Richardson for the last time to produce an album for a major artist, Diana Ross. Gibb first recorded the first four songs, "Oh Teacher", "I'm Watching You" and "Don't Give Up on Each Other". Michael Jackson recorded the title track around May 1985 but it remains unreleased.

== Track listing ==
No.	Title	Writer(s)	Length
1.	"Oh Teacher"	Barry Gibb, Robin Gibb, Maurice Gibb	3:25
2.	"Experience"	Barry Gibb, Robin Gibb, Maurice Gibb, Andy Gibb	4:47
3.	"More and More"	Barry Gibb, Albhy Galuten, Andy Gibb	3:02
4.	"I'm Watching You"	Barry Gibb, Robin Gibb, Maurice Gibb	3:41
5.	"Love on the Line"	Barry Gibb, Robin Gibb, Maurice Gibb	4:01
6.	"(I Love) Being in Love with You"	Barry Gibb, Robin Gibb, Maurice Gibb	4:30
7.	"Crime of Passion"	Barry Gibb, Robin Gibb, Maurice Gibb	3:44
8.	"Don't Give Up on Each Other"	Barry Gibb, George Bitzer	3:53

== Personnel ==
- Barry Gibb – vocals, guitar
- Albhy Galuten – piano, synthesizer
- Unknown – bass guitar, drums
