= Drown On the River =

Single by Barry Gibb

from the album Deal
- Released: August 2007; 28 April 2008 (Deal soundtrack)
- Length: 3:46
- Label: Lightyear (Deal soundtrack)
- Songwriters: Barry Gibb; Steve Gibb; Ashley Gibb

Barry Gibb singles chronology
"Underworld" (2007)	"Drown On the River" (2007)	"All in Your Name" (2011)

"Drown On the River" is a song recorded by Barry Gibb, released as a single in August 2007 weeks after he released his previous single "Underworld". It was Gibb's first country single. It was included on the soundtrack of the film Deal on 29 April 2008, along with other country songs. It was also included on the multiple-artist compilation album How Many Sleeps? (2008) released only in Europe.

== Composition ==
The song's recordings features Gibb on vocals and guitar, Steve Gibb on guitar, Big Dan on banjo and mandolin and Ashley Gibb on maracas.

To "drown on the river" is to lose a poker hand because of the last card drawn. The Deal film was scheduled to release in September 2007 but it was released direct to DVD in Europe around February 2008, and to ‘select theaters’ in the United States at the end of April, when the soundtrack CD also appeared.

== Personnel ==
- Barry Gibb — vocals, guitar
- Steve Gibb — guitar
- Big Dan — banjo, mandolin
- Ashley Gibb — maracas
