= This Woman (Kenny Rogers song) =

1983 single by Kenny Rogers

Single by Kenny Rogers

from the album Eyes That See in the Dark
- B-side: "Buried Treasure"
- Released: December 1983 (US); January 1984
- Recorded: May 1983
- Length: 3:55
- Label: RCA Records
- Songwriters: Barry Gibb, Albhy Galuten
- Producer: Gibb-Galuten-Richardson

Kenny Rogers singles chronology
"Eyes That See in the Dark" (1983)	"This Woman" (1983)	"Buried Treasure" (1983)

"This Woman" is a song written by Barry Gibb and Albhy Galuten and was performed by American country recording artist Kenny Rogers. It reached No. 2 on the US Adult Contemporary Chart and No. 23 on the US Pop Chart. It was published by Gibb Brothers Music and Unichappell Music.

RCA pushed "This Woman" to pop radio, but the country stations flipped to the song's B-side "Buried Treasure". In Germany, "This Woman"'s B-side was "Hold Me", another track from the album. This song was recorded in May 1983 released in late 1983 in the US, and early 1984 outside the US.

== Personnel ==
- Kenny Rogers — vocals
- Barry Gibb — background vocals, guitar, arranger
- Maurice Gibb — guitar, bass, synthesizer
- Tim Renwick — guitar
- George Terry — guitar
- George Bitzer – piano, synthesizer
- Albhy Galuten — piano, synthesizer, arranger
- Ron Ziegler – drums
- Joe Lala — percussion

== Weekly charts ==
Chart (1983–84)	Peak position
Argentina (CAPIF)	10
US Billboard Hot 100	23
US Adult Contemporary (Billboard)	2

== Barry Gibb version ==
"This Woman"

Song by Barry Gibb

from the album The Eyes That See in the Dark Demos
- Released: November 2006
- Recorded: January 1983
- Length: 3:57
- Songwriters: Barry Gibb, Albhy Galuten

The original Barry Gibb demo version was released in late 2006 in iTunes on The Eyes That See in the Dark Demos The song has a choppy verse with a style more like Miami than Nashville., with Gibb singing lead and harmony on the chorus. Gibb's version of the song was recorded around January 1983, along with two songs, "You and I" and "Midsummer Nights".

=== Personnel ===
- Barry Gibb — lead and harmony vocal, guitar
- Albhy Galuten — piano, synthesizer
