= Gowers Review of Intellectual Property =

Review of intellectual property rights in the UK

The Gowers Review of Intellectual Property was an independent review of the copyright law of the United Kingdom focusing on "intellectual property rights", conducted from December 2005 to December 2006. Chancellor of the Exchequer, Gordon Brown, commissioned Andrew Gowers to lead the review; Gowers had just left a position as editor of the Financial Times when he took up the position on 2 December 2005. The review coincided with a 2006 survey carried out on behalf of the National Consumer Council, which indicated that over half of British adults infringe copyright law by duplicating and ripping music CDs. Following the review, in January 2008 the government initiated a public consultation period on proposals to legalise personal copying.

The review concludes that the UK's intellectual property system is fundamentally strong but makes 54 concrete recommendations for improvements, broadly covering the areas of: strengthening enforcement; providing additional support to business; and striking a balance between protecting intellectual property and allowing free market competition.

On 27 November 2006, it was reported that the copyright of recorded music should not, according to the review's recommendations, be extended from the current 50 years after the date of recording. The British Phonographic Industry and prominent musicians, such as Cliff Richard and Ian Anderson, had lobbied for an extension to 95 years, matching the length of copyright provided in the US; other musicians, such as Dave Rowntree of Blur provided counteropinions. The Gowers Review found that the UK, compared with the USA, suffers no apparent impediment to creativity due to this disparity.

The Review's conclusions were published on 6 December 2006 as part of the Chancellor's annual pre-budget report. A full-page advertisement, known as the Fair play for musicians ad, was taken in the Financial Times of 7 December, stating "Fair play for musicians: We call upon the UK Government to support the extension of copyright on sound recordings", and was signed by over 4,500 musicians, including a few dead ones.

== Repercussions ==
Richard Sargeant, a civil servant who wrote large amounts of the Review, was later hired by Google. In January 2009, as Google's "public policy manager", he called for reforms to incorporate exemptions similar to the United States' fair use doctrine into UK and Europe copyright law.
