= Now Voyager =

Studio album by Barry Gibb
- Released: 17 September 1984
- Recorded: 1984
- Studio: Criteria (Miami); Ocean Way (Hollywood)
- Length: 47:53
- Label: Polydor (United Kingdom); MCA (United States)
- Producer: Barry Gibb, Karl Richardson

Barry Gibb chronology
The Kid's No Good (Unreleased)	Now Voyager (1984)	Moonlight Madness (1986)

Singles from Now Voyager
- 1. "Face to Face" Released: 1984 (promo single); 2. "Shine, Shine" Released: August 1984; 3. "Fine Line" Released: October 1984

Now Voyager is the debut solo studio album by British singer-songwriter Barry Gibb, the member of the Bee Gees. It was released on 17 September 1984 by Polydor Records in the UK and MCA Records in the US. Now Voyager was recorded sometime around the year at Criteria Studios in Miami, Florida, and Ocean Way Recording in Hollywood, California, and was produced by Gibb and Karl Richardson. It contains his biggest solo hits, "Shine, Shine" and "Fine Line". The album also included the Olivia Newton-John duet "Face to Face", which was released as a promo single. Gibb co-produced the album with Karl Richardson, who had been working with the Bee Gees since 1975. The front cover photograph was taken by Alex Henderson at Victoria Baths, Manchester.

Gibb had recorded an entire album in 1970 called The Kid's No Good, which never received official release. He recorded Now Voyager in 1983. In 1986, Gibb recorded his third solo album Moonlight Madness, which remains unreleased, leaving Now Voyager his only officially released solo album until 2016's In the Now.

== Background and recording ==
Gibb finally released his second solo album Now Voyager as he explained:

"It's something I always wanted to do, but I never quite felt confident enough to do it. The man who really made me think seriously about it was Irving Azoff, who convinced me that there was possibly a market out there for me. As unhappy about it as we were at the time, we now appreciate why it didn't do well. We worked nine months on that album. That's crazy. I think you lose energy by doing that. The message has to be that we really can't take so long making albums. The business doesn't like to see its artists get too hot. I think the same thing may apply to Michael [Jackson]. As talented as the guy is, people will only hear something so many times and then they're ready for something else."

Keyboardist George Bitzer co-wrote songs on this album (except for songs 4 and 10) as well as Barry's brothers; Maurice co-wrote "I Am Your Driver", "Lesson in Love", "Temptation" and "The Hunter" and Robin also worked on "The Hunter". Barry alone wrote two songs for the album: "Shatterproof" and "She Says".

The album sounded like a Bee Gees album minus the harmonies of Robin and Maurice Gibb and throughout most of it, danceable rhythms and synthesizer work was noticeable. The album was more commercially successful than the most recent Bee Gees 1981 album at the time, Living Eyes. Barry started recording demos for the album in August 1983 with the track "I Wanna Go Home With You", and he continued to record from November to December 1983, with the songs "Face to Face", "The Hunter", "Fine Line", "One Night (For Lovers)" and "Illusions". The musicians who played on the demos were Maurice Gibb on guitar, bass and synthesizer, and George Bitzer on piano and synthesizer.

The album was recorded at Middle Ear Studios, aside from string additions on some tracks which were done at Ocean Way in Los Angeles. Albhy Galuten is notably absent from the production team as he left for California in 1983 after disagreeing with Barry on where to go next. Albhy wanted to break free from the studio straight jacket of recording tracks to mechanical beats and dubbing onto them; instead he suggested that they rent a theater in New York City where Barry could do a series of live performances before audiences for a week, using all the session players they usually used. He suggested they could record all shows and pick the best takes of each new song. Barry did not want to do this and Albhy moved on, but Karl Richardson carried on. The musicians who played on the album were Michael Brecker (who also worked with Steely Dan, Herbie Hancock, Quincy Jones and others), Randy Brecker (who also worked with Frank Zappa, Bruce Springsteen and others). Roger Daltrey of The Who, Olivia Newton-John, Harry Wayne Casey of KC and the Sunshine Band and others sing backup on "Fine Line". Jimmie Haskell, who conducts the orchestra, also worked with Maurice earlier in 1984.

== Release ==
The album originally reached #72 on US Billboard 200 before dropping to #88, then #119 on 24 November 1984 and #148 on 1 December 1984. The album had three singles, including "Shine, Shine", "Fine Line" and the promo single "Face to Face".

Barry also released a feature-length Now Voyager music video special, directed by Storm Thorgerson. Several large posters for Now Voyager can be seen in the background of a record store in the Woody Allen film Hannah and Her Sisters. The album was mastered at Sterling Sound, New York, and pressed in West Germany.

The album cover artwork consists of Gibb in front of a historic photo of Victoria Baths in Hathersage Road, Manchester, some three miles from where Barry Gibb was raised.

== Track listing ==
All tracks are written by Barry Gibb, with additional contributors noted.

Side one
No.	Title	Writer(s)	Length
1.	"I Am Your Driver"	Maurice Gibb; George Bitzer	4:43
2.	"Fine Line"	Bitzer	5:07
3.	"Face to Face" (duet with Olivia Newton-John)	M. Gibb; Bitzer	4:18
4.	"Shatterproof"		3:59
5.	"Shine, Shine"	M. Gibb; Bitzer	4:43

Side two
No.	Title	Writer(s)	Length
1.	"Lesson in Love"	M. Gibb; Bitzer	3:52
2.	"One Night (For Lovers)"	Bitzer	4:15
3.	"Stay Alone"	Bitzer	3:49
4.	"Temptation"	M. Gibb; Bitzer	3:30
5.	"She Says"		4:07
6.	"The Hunter"	Robin Gibb; M. Gibb; Bitzer	4:27

== Personnel ==
- Barry Gibb – lead vocals, backing vocals, guitars, string arrangements
- George Bitzer – keyboards, synthesizers
- George Terry – guitars, bass guitar
- Harold Cowart – bass guitar
- Dennis Bryon – drums
- Ron Ziegler – drums
- Lenny Castro – percussion
- Joe Lala – percussion
- Michael Brecker – saxophones
- Randy Brecker – trumpet
- Terry Harrington, Walt Johnson, Harold Diner, Lew McCreary, Bob Findley, Vincent DeRosa and David Duke – brass section
- Jimmie Haskell – string arrangements and conductor
- Sidney Sharp – concertmaster
- Denise DeCaro – backing vocals, vocal contractor side 1 (2, 4, 5) side 2 (1)
- Myrna Matthews – backing vocals side one (2, 4, 5) side 2 (1)
- Marti McCall – backing vocals side one (2, 4, 5) side 2 (1)
- Olivia Newton-John – backing vocals (2), lead vocals (3)
- Harry Wayne Casey – backing vocals (2)
- Roger Daltrey – backing vocals (2)
- Kitty Terry – backing vocals (2)

=== Production ===
- Barry Gibb – producer
- Karl Richardson – producer
- Steve Klein – engineer
- Larry Janus – additional engineer
- Steve Crimmel – assistant engineer
- Neal Kent – assistant engineer
- George Marino – mastering at Sterling Sound (New York, NY)
- Dick Ashby – project coordinator
- Tom Kennedy – project coordinator
- Scott Sands – coordinating assistant
- Richard Evans – photography
- Alex Henderson – photography
- Lawrence Lawry – photography
- ICON – artwork
