= Fair play for musicians =

UK advertisement calling for copyright extension

Fair play for musicians is a full-page advertisement that was published on 7 December 2006 in the Financial Times newspaper calling on the UK Government to extend the existing 50 years copyright protection for sound recordings in the United Kingdom. It consisted of around 4,500 names in small print filling the full page and its style was consistent with other newspaper petitions. The text "fair play for musicians" appeared in large red type over the list of names. In the centre of the page a box contained the text:

"We call upon the UK Government to support the extension of copyright in sound recordings."

At the bottom of the page the following text appeared:

"On behalf of over 3,500 record companies and 40,000 performers"

The 'fair play for musicians' advertisement was viewed as a direct response to the Gowers Review published by the British Government on 6 December 2006 which recommended the retention of the 50 year protection for sound recordings. The advertisement was organised by Phonographic Performance Limited as another element of their campaign for retrospective copyright term extension.

The advertisement was controversial as it was seen as another step in a protracted campaign to influence British Government policy, and gave rise to worldwide media coverage, which was unusual for issues of copyright term policy. The advertisement's inclusions of a number of deceased musicians raised suspicions that it was not a genuine representation of the wishes of the musicians listed. Prominent law professor Lawrence Lessig criticised the advertisement for being misleading and declared the date of its publication, December 7, was "a date which will live in infamy." The date is the same as Pearl Harbor attack and Lessig was alluding to Franklin Delano Roosevelt's famous statement.
