= Islands in the Stream (song) =

1983 song by Kenny Rogers and Dolly Parton

Single by Kenny Rogers and Dolly Parton

from the album Eyes That See in the Dark
- B-side: "I Will Always Love You" (US); "Midsummer Nights" (UK)
- Released: August 15, 1983
- Recorded: May 1983
- Studio: Middle Ear, Miami; Lion Share, Los Angeles; Ocean Way, Hollywood
- Genre: Soft rock; country pop
- Length: 4:08
- Label: RCA
- Songwriters: Barry Gibb; Robin Gibb; Maurice Gibb
- Producer: Gibb-Galuten-Richardson

Kenny Rogers singles chronology
"Scarlet Fever" (1983)	"Islands in the Stream" (1983)	"This Woman" (1984)

Dolly Parton singles chronology
"Potential New Boyfriend" (1983)	"Islands in the Stream" (1983)	"Save the Last Dance for Me" (1984)

Music video
- "Islands in the Stream" on YouTube

"Islands in the Stream" is a song written by the Bee Gees and recorded by American country music artists Kenny Rogers and Dolly Parton. It was released in August 1983 as the first single from Rogers's fifteenth studio album Eyes That See in the Dark. The Bee Gees released a live version in 1998 and a studio version in 2001.

The song reached number one on the Billboard Hot 100 chart in the United States, giving each of Rogers and Parton their second pop number-one hit (after Rogers's "Lady" in 1980 and Parton's "9 to 5" in 1981). It also topped the Country and Adult Contemporary charts. In 2005, the song topped Country Music Television's poll of the best country duets of all time; Parton and Rogers reunited to perform the song on a CMT special. As of May 2023, it has been triple certified Platinum by the Recording Industry Association of America for three million certified units.

Rogers and Parton went on to record a Christmas album together and had an additional hit with their 1985 duet "Real Love".

== Background ==
Named after the 1970 novel by Ernest Hemingway, the song was originally written for Diana Ross in an R&B style but later reworked for the duet by Rogers and Parton.

It has been claimed that the song was also intended for Marvin Gaye. This is attributed to a 2001 Good Morning America interview with the Bee Gees. When Barry Gibb said the song was written for Ross, Robin Gibb interrupted and said, "No, we wrote it for Marvin Gaye ... We sent it to him but he was dead so it was a bit difficult for him to sing it." Gaye actually died in 1984, a year after the recording. Separately, Robin Gibb has said the song was stylistically written "... as a Tamla kind of soul song in a Marvin Gaye type feel", though not asserting it was for Gaye. In other interviews, Barry Gibb has always maintained that Ross was the original artist for the song with no mention of Gaye.

For licensing reasons, the song was not included on the digital release of Eyes That See in the Dark from Capitol Records Nashville. Sony Music, the current owner of RCA Records, protected copyrights in the recording, which is digitally available only in various compilations from Sony Music, especially those of Dolly Parton.

== Musical structure ==
The song is sung in moderate 4/4 time, with Rogers and Parton alternating lead vocals. Their version is in C major when Rogers sings lead, but changes to A-flat major when Parton takes over the lead.

== Critical reception ==
Cash Box said that "the sound is simply gorgeous, as is the melody, as are the voices."

In 2024, Rolling Stone ranked the song at #104 on its 200 Greatest Country Songs of All Time ranking.

== Commercial performance ==
The song knocked Bonnie Tyler's "Total Eclipse of the Heart" out of No. 1 on the Billboard Hot 100, also topping the Country and Adult Contemporary listings. In December of that year, it was certified platinum by the Recording Industry Association of America for selling over two million physical copies in the US. After becoming available for digital download, it had sold a further 834,000 digital copies in the US, as of January 2019.

In Australia, the song was number one for one week in December 1983 and became one of the highest selling singles of 1984.

The song reached a peak of No. 7 in the UK Singles Chart in 1983. As of July 2014, it had also sold 245,577 digital copies in the UK. As of 2017, it had racked up 287,200 downloads and 4.83 million streams in the UK. "Islands in the Stream" reappeared on the UK Singles Chart at No. 13 after Parton's death in August 2026, with the Official Charts Company reporting the song had amassed 2,195,255 total units in the UK since 1994.

== In popular media ==
In April 2008, South Bend, Indiana, radio station WZOW played the song continuously for several days on end, a stunt drawing attention to the station's format change from alternative rock to adult contemporary.

The song is prominently featured in the 2025 film, You're Cordially Invited, starring Will Ferrell and Reese Witherspoon.

== Charts ==
=== Weekly charts ===
Chart (1983–1984)	Peak position
Australia (Kent Music Report)	1
Austria (Ö3 Austria Top 40)	1
Belgium (VRT Top 30 Flanders)	4
Canada (The Record)	1
Canada Adult Contemporary Tracks (RPM)	1
Canada Country Tracks (RPM)	1
Canada Top Singles (RPM)	1
Europe (Eurochart Hot 100)	3
Ireland (IRMA)	2
Italy (Musica e dischi)	49
Netherlands (Dutch Top 40)	4
New Zealand (Recorded Music NZ)	2
Norway (VG-lista)	2
South Africa (Springbok Radio)	4
Spain (AFYVE)	28
Sweden (Sverigetopplistan)	3
UK Singles (Official Charts)	7
US Billboard Hot 100	1
US Hot Country Songs (Billboard)	1
US Adult Contemporary (Billboard)	1
US Cash Box Top 100	1
Venezuela (AP)	5
West Germany (GfK)	25

Chart (2026)	Peak position
Australia On Replay (ARIA)	3
Canada Hot 100 (Billboard)	30
Denmark (Tracklisten)	36
Global 200 (Billboard)	43
Israel International Airplay (Media Forest)	7
South Africa Airplay (TOSAC)	3
UK Singles (Official Charts)	9

=== Year-end charts ===
Chart (1983)	Rank
Australia (Kent Music Report)	40
Canada Top Singles (RPM)	15
New Zealand	40
US Cash Box	11

Chart (1984)	Rank
Australia (Kent Music Report)	10
South Africa	4
US Billboard Hot 100	56

== Certifications ==
Region	Certification	Certified units/sales
Australia (ARIA)	Platinum	70,000^{‡}
Austria (IFPI Austria)	Platinum	100,000^{*}
Canada (Music Canada)	3× Platinum	240,000^{‡}
Denmark (IFPI Danmark)	Platinum	90,000^{‡}
New Zealand (RMNZ)	7× Platinum	210,000^{‡}
United Kingdom (BPI)	3× Platinum	1,800,000^{‡}
United States (RIAA)	3× Platinum	3,000,000^{‡}
Streaming
Sweden (GLF)	Platinum	8,000,000^{†}
^{*} Sales figures based on certification alone.^{‡} Sales+streaming figures based on certification alone.^{†} Streaming-only figures based on certification alone.

== Sampling ==
The song was sampled in "Ghetto Supastar (That Is What You Are)", recorded by American rapper Pras featuring Mya and Ol' Dirty Bastard.The song was released on April 21, 1998.

== Bee Gees' recorded version ==
"Islands in the Stream"

Song by Bee Gees

from the album Their Greatest Hits: The Record
- Released: 20 November 2001
- Recorded: 2001
- Genre: Rhythm and blues
- Length: 4:23
- Label: Polydor
- Songwriters: Barry Gibb; Robin Gibb; Maurice Gibb
- Producers: Barry Gibb; Robin Gibb; Maurice Gibb

Audio
- "Islands in the Stream" on YouTube

The Bee Gees performed their version live at the MGM Grand in Las Vegas on 14 November 1997, which was released a year later on One Night Only, with solo vocal by Barry Gibb. A studio version was recorded for their 2001 retrospective Their Greatest Hits: The Record, which has since featured on the 2004 Number Ones and on the 2010 Mythology box set. The chorus of Pras's 1998 hit "Ghetto Supastar (That Is What You Are)", which in turn is a reworking of the original Rogers and Parton release, replaces the final chorus in the studio recording. The live version of the song appears on their Love Songs compilation.

Personnel (studio version)

- Robin Gibb – vocals
- Maurice Gibb – keyboards, programming
- John Merchant – sound engineer

Personnel (live version)

- Barry Gibb – lead vocals, acoustic rhythm guitar
- Robin Gibb – harmony and backing vocals
- Maurice Gibb – harmony and backing vocals, keyboards

with

- Alan Kendall – lead guitar
- Steve Gibb – guitar
- Steve Rucker - drums
- Matt Bonelli - bass
- Ben Stivers - keyboards/synth

== Comic Relief version ==
"(Barry) Islands in the Stream"

Single by Ruth Jones and Rob Brydon featuring Tom Jones and Robin Gibb

from the album Islands in the Stream
- Released: March 8, 2009
- Genre: Country; comedy
- Songwriters: Barry Gibb; Maurice Gibb; Robin Gibb
- Producer: Hugh Padgham

Robin Gibb singles chronology
"Too Much Heaven" (2007)	"(Barry) Islands in the Stream" (2009)	"I've Gotta Get a Message to You" (2011)

Music video
- "Barry Islands in the Stream" on YouTube

On March 8, 2009, Welsh celebrities Ruth Jones and Rob Brydon, in character as Vanessa Jenkins and Bryn West from the hit BBC sitcom Gavin & Stacey, released a version of the song as a single for Comic Relief. Sir Tom Jones also features on the song, performing the final verse and chorus, whilst Robin Gibb appears on the single as a backing vocalist.

Re-titled "(Barry) Islands in the Stream", in reference to the Barry Island setting of Gavin & Stacey, it entered at the top of the UK Singles Chart on March 15, 2009. This meant the Gibb Brothers had achieved number one songs in five successive decades, the first songwriters to achieve this feat. It also made Tom Jones, at the age of 68, the oldest person to have a UK number one song, until the record was taken in 2020 by Captain Tom Moore for his involvement in "You'll Never Walk Alone" at the age of 99.

The video was filmed in Barry Island, Las Vegas and the Nevada desert, with both Gibb and Jones appearing in the video alongside Jones and Brydon. Nigel Lythgoe also makes a cameo appearance as a talent competition judge.

=== Track listing ===
- CD single
1. "(Barry) Islands in the Stream" – 3:56
2. "Wisemen" – 3:14
3. "Somethin' Stupid" – 2:48
4. "Islands in the Stream" (music video) – 4:21
- DVD single
1. "(Barry) Islands in the Stream" (full-length video) – 8:56
2. "(Barry) Islands in the Stream" (making of the video) – 14:30

=== Charts ===
==== Weekly charts ====
Chart (2009)	Peak position
Europe (European Hot 100)	11
Scottish Singles Sales (Official Charts)	1
UK Singles (Official Charts)	1

==== Year-end charts ====
Chart (2009)	Position
UK Singles (OCC)	108

== Other well-known cover versions ==
- Danish blues-rock singer Peter Thorup and pop singer Anne-Grete Rendtorff had great success with a version with Danish lyrics in 1984 called "Skibe uden Sejl" (Ships Without Sails). The song was used as title track for the Danish TV series Måske i morgen (Maybe Tomorrow) shown on Danish national television DR.
- Feist and Constantines released a single of the song in 2008.
- Country artists Hailey Whitters and Ernest, under the moniker Countrypolitan, covered the song in 2021.
- Jennifer Love Hewitt released a solo cover of the song from the series 9-1-1 in 2024.
- Sabrina Carpenter covered the song as a duet with Kermit the Frog and Miss Piggy in the 2026 The Muppet Show revival special.

== See also ==
- List of Billboard Hot 100 number-one singles of 1983
