= Heartbreaker (Dionne Warwick album) =

Studio album by Dionne Warwick
- Released: September 28, 1982
- Recorded: April–May 1982
- Studio: Middle Ear Studios (Miami, Florida); Mediasound Studios (New York City, New York)
- Genre: Funk; soul
- Length: 39:51
- Label: Arista
- Producer: Gibb-Galuten-Richardson

Dionne Warwick chronology
Friends in Love (1982)	Heartbreaker (1982)	How Many Times Can We Say Goodbye (1983)

Singles from Heartbreaker
- 1. "Heartbreaker" Released: September 1982; 2. "All the Love in the World" Released: November 1982; 3. "Take the Short Way Home" Released: January 1983 (US); 4. "Yours" Released: February 1983

Heartbreaker is a studio album by American singer Dionne Warwick. It was released by Arista Records on September 28, 1982, in the United States. Her fifth album with the label, it was largely written by Barry Gibb and produced by Gibb, Albhy Galuten and Karl Richardson; Gibb and Galuten also served as musicians on the album. Warwick recorded the songs on Heartbreaker during the spring of 1982.

Heartbreaker was released two years after Barry Gibb had written and co-produced the hugely successful album Guilty for Barbra Streisand. While their own careers as a band were now in decline (following the poorly received Living Eyes album in 1981), Barry and his production team now employed the same tactics that had made Streisand's album such a phenomenal success, but this time for Dionne Warwick. They would later go on to further successful collaborations with Kenny Rogers in 1983 and Diana Ross in 1985, before the Bee Gees experienced renewed success as a band themselves in the late 1980s.

The Heartbreaker album sold an estimated three million copies worldwide and ranks as Warwick's highest-charting album in most international territories. It hit number one on the Norwegian Albums Chart and reached the top five in Sweden, the United Kingdom and in the Netherlands, also entering the top 20 in Austria, Germany, and on the US Top R&B/Hip-Hop Albums. In the US, Heartbreaker was certified gold by the Recording Industry Association of America (RIAA) for sales in excess of 500,000 copies.

The title track, the album's lead single, reached the top of charts around the world and stands as one of Warwick's biggest career hits, reaching number one in Poland, Portugal, Sweden and on the US Adult Contemporary chart. The following two singles were "Take the Short Way Home" and "All the Love in the World", the latter of which reached the top ten on the UK Singles Chart. The Heartbreaker Demos, a collection of Barry Gibb's demos, was released in 2006.

== Critical reception ==
Professional ratings
Review scores
Source	Rating
AllMusic	3/5 stars

AllMusic editor Rob Theakston found that "while it lacks the genius and soulful grit of Dionne Warwick's earlier classic work, the album was polished and painstakingly produced perfectly for adult pop stations [...] Starting off with a bang courtesy of the title track, Warwick and Gibb go through all of the motions [...] This is not the most definitive album of Warwick's career, but is definitely one of the few highlights that a pop-heavy '80s afforded her."

== Track listing ==
All tracks produced by Gibb-Galuten-Richardson. All tracks written by Barry, Robin and Maurice Gibb, except where noted.

Side one
No.	Title	Writer(s)	Length
1.	"Heartbreaker"		4:16
2.	"It Makes No Difference"	B. Gibb; Albhy Galuten	4:26
3.	"Yours"		4:58
4.	"Take the Short Way Home"	B. Gibb; Galuten	3:47
5.	"Misunderstood"		4:07

Side two
No.	Title	Writer(s)	Length
6.	"All the Love in the World"		3:25
7.	"I Can't See Anything (But You)"	B. Gibb; Galuten; M. Gibb	3:24
8.	"Just One More Night"	B. Gibb; Galuten	3:51
9.	"You Are My Love"		3:50
10.	"Our Day Will Come"	Bob Hilliard; Mort Garson	3:47

Déjà Vu – The Arista Recordings (2020) bonus track
No.	Title	Writer(s)	Length
11.	"Let It Be Me" (demo duet with Barry Gibb)	Gilbert Bécaud; Manny Kurtz; Pierre Delanoë	3:46

== Personnel and credits ==
Musicians

- Dionne Warwick – vocals
- George Bitzer – pianos, synthesizers
- Albhy Galuten – pianos, synthesizers, horn and string arrangements, conductor
- Richard Tee – pianos
- Barry Gibb – acoustic guitars, backing vocals, horn and string arrangements
- George Terry – electric guitars (1)
- Tim Renwick – electric guitars (2–10)
- George "Chocolate" Perry – bass
- Steve Gadd – drums
- Dennis Bryon – percussion
- Joe Lala – percussion
- Anita Lopez – percussion
- Daniel Ben Zebulon – percussion
- Gene Orloff – string contractor
- Gary Brown – saxophone solos
- The Boneroo Horns:
  - Dan Bonsanti – saxophones
  - Neal Bonsanti – saxophones
  - Whit Sidener – saxophones
  - Peter Graves – trombone, leader
  - Ken Faulk – trumpet
  - Brett Murphy – trumpet

Production

- Barry Gibb – producer
- Albhy Galuten – producer
- Karl Richardson – producer, engineer
- Mike Fuller – assistant engineer
- Andy Hoffman – assistant engineer
- Nicky Kalliongis – assistant engineer
- Neal Kent – assistant engineer
- Dale Peterson – assistant engineer
- Sam Taylor-Porter – assistant engineer
- Criteria Studios (Miami, Florida) – mastering location
- Dick Ashby – project coordinator
- Marie Byars – project coordinator
- Tom Kennedy – project coordinator
- Robyn Frye-Kove – project coordinator
- Holly Ferguson – project coordinator
- Donn Davenport – art direction, logo design
- Garry Gross – photography
- Chad Shipley – illustration
- Clifford Peterson – hair
- Guy Vrable – make-up
- Fabrice – gown (front cover)
- Michaele Vollbracht – gown (back cover)
- Dionne Warwick – jewelry

== Charts ==
=== Weekly charts ===
Weekly chart performance for Heartbreaker
Chart (1982–1983)	Peak position
Australian Albums (Kent Music Report)	14
Austrian Albums (Ö3 Austria)	13
Dutch Albums (Album Top 100)	5
Finnish Albums (Suomen virallinen lista)	9
German Albums (Offizielle Top 100)	18
New Zealand Albums (RMNZ)	32
Norwegian Albums (VG-lista)	1
Swedish Albums (Sverigetopplistan)	2
UK Albums (OCC)	3
US Top LPs & Tape (Billboard)	25
US Black LPs (Billboard)	13
US Top 100 Albums (Cash Box)	38
US Top 75 Black Contemporary Albums (Cash Box)	17

=== Year-end charts ===
Year-end chart performance for Heartbreaker
Chart (1983)	Position
Dutch Albums (Album Top 100)	67
German Albums (Offizielle Top 100)	64
US Top LPs & Tape (Billboard)	71

== Certifications and sales ==
Certifications for Heartbreaker
Region	Certification	Certified units/sales
Netherlands (NVPI)	Gold	50,000^{^}
United Kingdom (BPI)	Platinum	300,000^{^}
United States (RIAA)	Gold	500,000^{^}
^{^} Shipments figures based on certification alone.

== See also ==
- The Heartbreaker Demos
