= Barry Gibb =

British musician (born 1946)

Sir Barry Gibb AC CBE
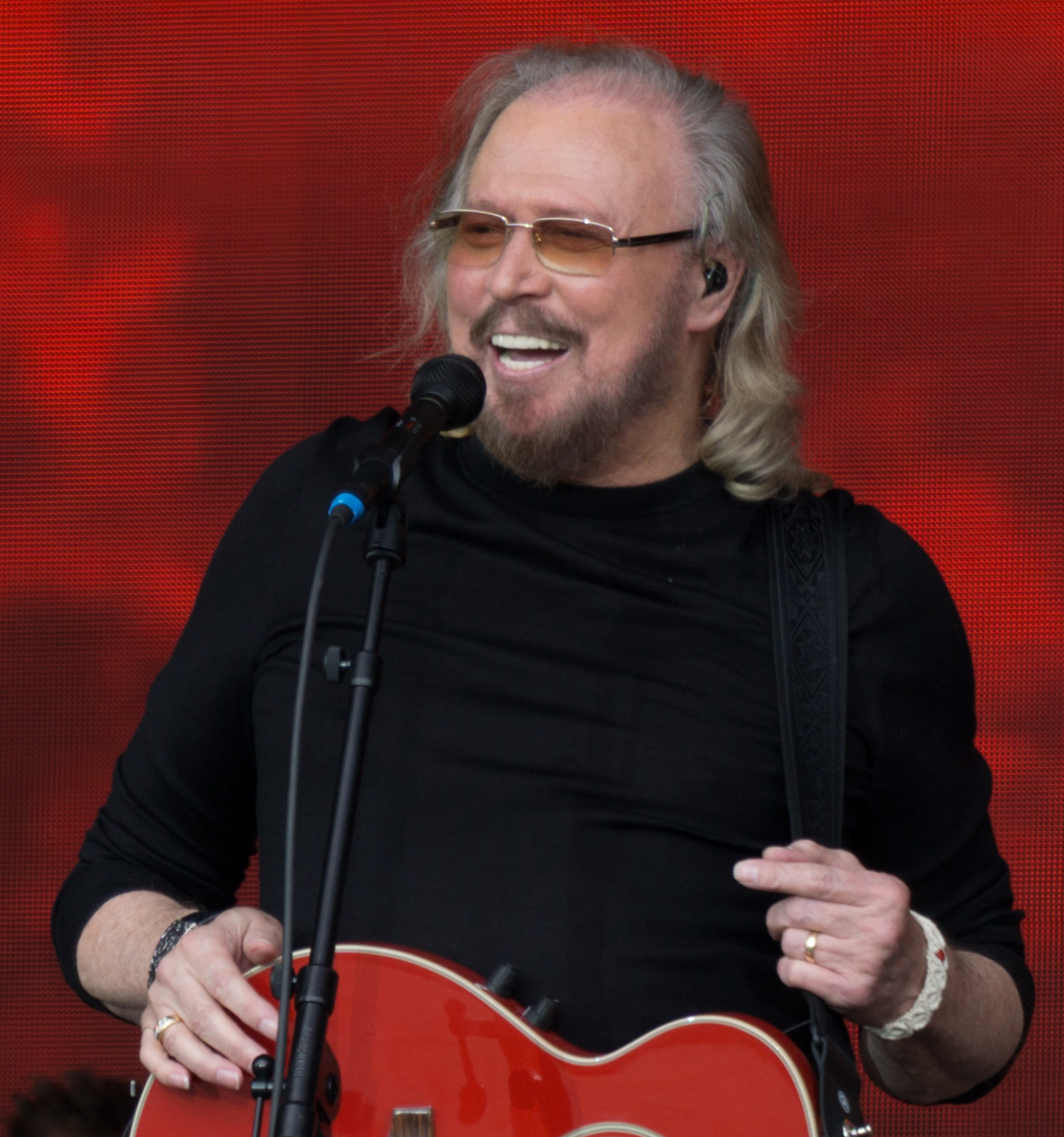
- Gibb performing at Glastonbury Festival 2017
- Born: Barry Alan Crompton Gibb; 1 September 1946 (age 80); Douglas, Isle of Man
- Other name: Johnny Hayes
- Occupations: Musician; singer; songwriter; record producer
- Years active: 1955–present
- Spouses: Maureen Bates (m. 1966; div. 1970); Linda Gray (m. 1970)
- Children: 5, including Steve
- Father: Hugh Gibb
- Relatives: Maurice Gibb (brother); Robin Gibb (brother); Andy Gibb (brother); Spencer Gibb (nephew); Lesley Gibb (sister)
- Musical career
- Origin: Manchester, England
- Genres: Rock; pop; disco; country
- Instruments: Vocals; guitar
- Labels: Polydor; Atco; MCA; Capitol
- Formerly of: Bee Gees; The Rattlesnakes
- Website: barrygibb.com

Sir Barry Alan Crompton Gibb (born 1 September 1946) is a British musician. Along with his younger fraternal twin brothers, Robin and Maurice, he rose to global fame as a founder of the Bee Gees, one of the most commercially successful groups in the history of popular music, and is its only surviving member. Gibb is well known for his wide vocal range, including a far-reaching high-pitched falsetto. His career has spanned over 70 years.

As a songwriter, Gibb shares the record for most consecutive Billboard Hot 100 number ones, at six, with John Lennon and Paul McCartney. In total, he has written or co-written sixteen Billboard Hot 100 number ones.

In 1994, Gibb and his brothers were inducted into the Songwriters Hall of Fame. In 1997, he was inducted into the Rock and Roll Hall of Fame as a member of the Bee Gees. In 2007, Q magazine ranked him 38th on its list of the "100 Greatest Singers". Guinness World Records lists him as the second most successful songwriter in history, behind McCartney.

Gibb was appointed a Commander of the Order of the British Empire (CBE) in the 2002 New Year Honours for services to music and entertainment, and a Knight Bachelor in the 2018 New Year Honours for services to music and charity. He was also made an Honorary Companion of the Order of Australia on 27 January 2022.

== Early years ==
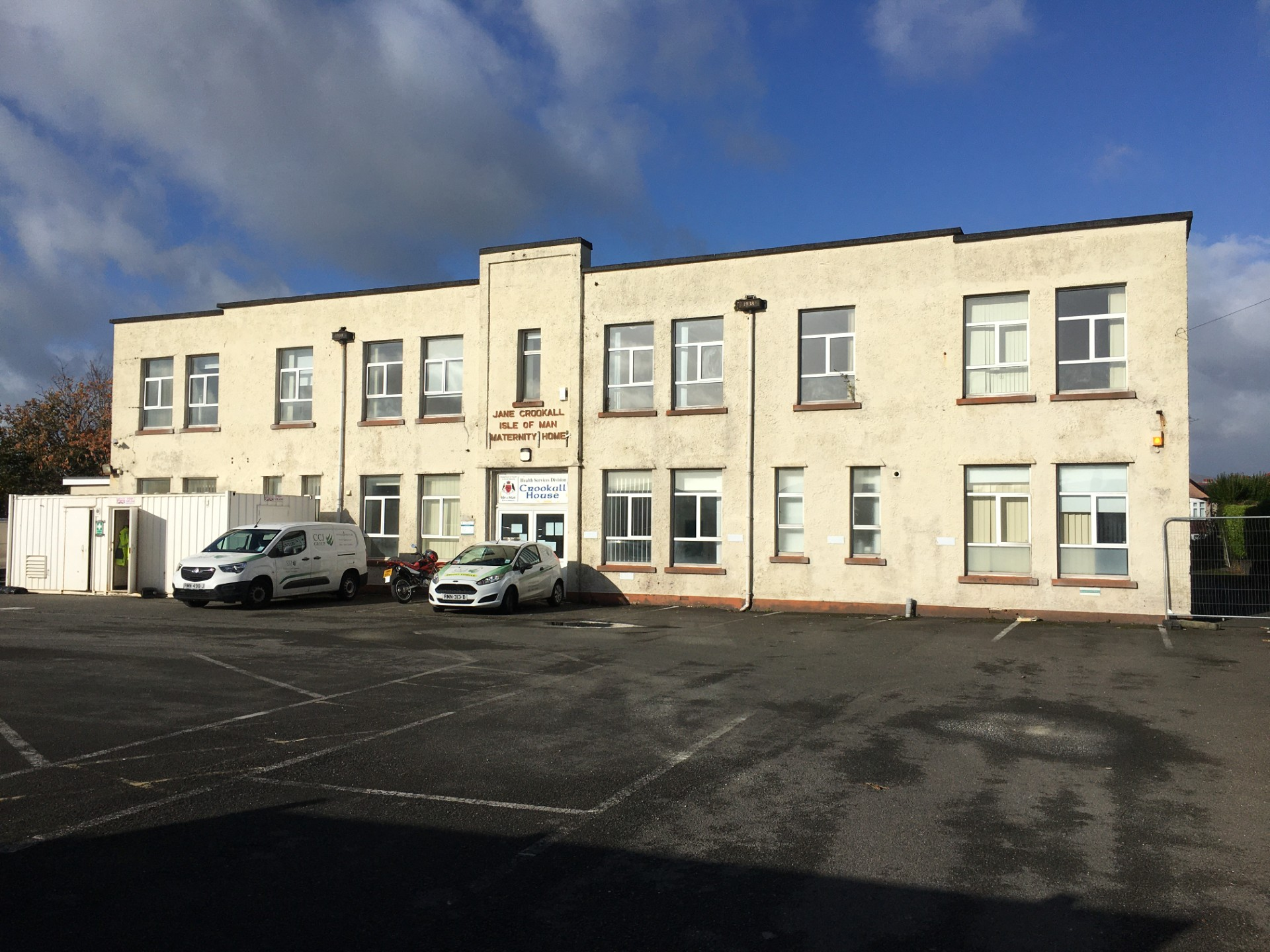
The Jane Crookall Maternity Home, Douglas Isle of Man, where Barry Gibb was born on 1 September 1946

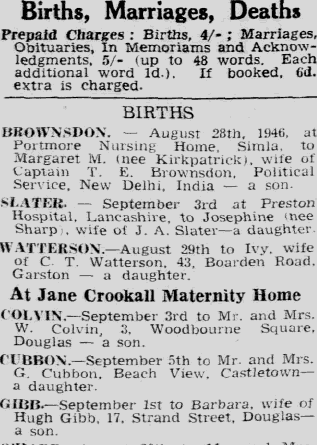
Announcement of the birth of Barry Gibb (Isle of Man Examiner, Friday 6 September 1946)

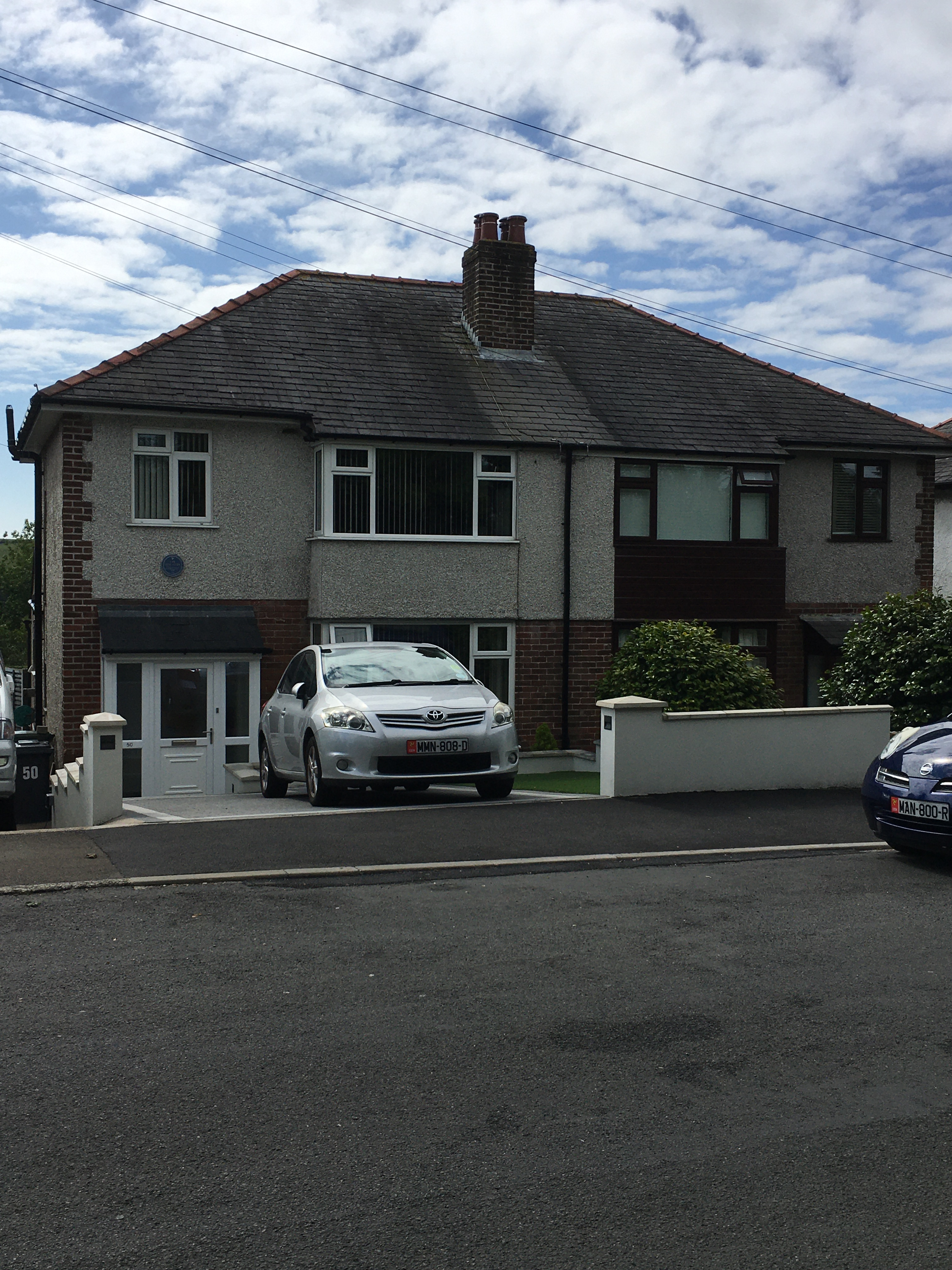
50 St Catherine's Drive, Douglas, Isle of Man, childhood home of the Bee Gees

Barry Alan Crompton Gibb was born at Jane Crookall Maternity Home in Douglas, Isle of Man, on 1 September 1946, to Hugh Gibb (15 January 1916 – 6 March 1992), a drummer, and Barbara Gibb (née Pass; 17 November 1920 – 12 August 2016), both Manchester natives. He has English, Irish and Scottish ancestry. Gibb's grandfather Hugh Gibb Sr. was born in Lanarkshire, Scotland, in 1892. He has an older sister, Lesley Evans. His second name, "Alan", was after his father's youngest brother, who had died in infancy. According to Hugh Gibb, in a mix of fact and fiction, his third name, "Crompton", was given to honour the Gibbs' ancestor Sir Isaac Crompton (actually Samuel Crompton).

When Gibb was born, his father worked as a musician at various hotels in Douglas, and his mother stayed at home looking after the children. Later, the Gibbs moved to Chapel House on Strang Road. When he was almost two years old, he was badly scalded in an accident involving a hot teapot his mother had just set on the table, which he was able to reach and knock over. He was in Nobles Hospital for about two and a half months. Gibb has said of that incident:

Then the gangrene set in. Because in those days, the advancement of medicine simply didn't apply to people with bad scalds, so you didn't have skin grafts, you didn't have things like that. But this was a particularly bad scald, and I think I had 20 minutes to live at some point. The incredible thing for me is that whole two years is wiped from my memory, the whole period of being in hospital. The idea of being burnt is in there somewhere, but I have no knowledge of it. I've got the scars but I have no knowledge.

In 1949, the Gibb family relocated to 50 St. Catherine's Drive. On 22 December, Gibb's brothers Robin and Maurice were born. When the twins were young, the family moved to Smedley Cottage, Spring Valley, also in Douglas.

Gibb started school on 4 September 1951, aged five, attending Braddan School. In 1952, the Gibb family relocated to 43 Snaefell Road, Willaston, where they lived for the next two years. The same year, he went to Tynwald Street Infants School. On his seventh birthday in 1953, he went to Desmesne Road Boys School.

== Musical career ==
=== 1955–1966: early performances and songwriting ===
In 1955, when the Gibb family moved back to their hometown of Manchester, the brothers formed the skiffle group the Rattlesnakes, consisting of Barry on vocals, lead and slide guitar, Robin and Maurice on vocals and acoustic guitar and friends/neighbours Paul Frost and Kenny Horrocks also providing vocals. By 1957, the Rattlesnakes played songs by Cliff Richard, Paul Anka, Buddy Holly and the Everly Brothers. Gibb once said the first song they played was Anka's "I Love You, Baby", but in 1968, he remembered it as the Everly Brothers' "Wake Up Little Susie". The Rattlesnakes' first professional gig was on 28 December 1957 in the Gaumont Cinema. Around 1958, Gibb's guitar was accidentally broken by Frost, who described it as "broken in the middle". In May 1958, when the Gibbs moved to Northern Grove, Frost and Horrocks left the band. The brothers later changed the group's name to Wee Johnny Hayes and the Blue Cats. Under that name, they performed regularly in Minor 15, a talent contest for under-fifteens held on Thursday nights from 7 to 9 p.m. at Princess Club in Chorlton.

On 5 March 1958, Gibb's brother Andy was born. In August, the Gibb family set sail for Australia as part of an assisted migration scheme from Southampton on the ship Fairsea. Also aboard was Red Symons, future guitarist of Skyhooks, as well as Kylie Minogue's parents. In 1959, the brothers began singing between races at the Redcliffe Speedway under the name "the Bee Gees". Their talent brought them to the attention of Bill Gates, a radio deejay. Gates was also interested in Gibb's original material, including "Let Me Love You" and "(Underneath the) Starlight of Love". After hearing those songs, Gates asked Gibb for more original material. Gibb quit school in September 1961, and the Gibbs moved to Surfers Paradise. The brothers spent the summers of 1961 and 1962 performing at hotels and clubs in the Gold Coast area. By September 1962, Gibb had auditioned songs for Col Joye. The Gibb family moved to Sydney at the start of 1963.

Around that time, the Bee Gees were signed to Festival Records, but were assigned to Leedon Records. Their first single, "The Battle of the Blue and the Grey", was written by Gibb. Gibb wrote all the Bee Gees' singles from 1963 to 1966. In July 1963, Lonnie Lee, one of Australia's top recording stars at the time, recorded what is said to be the first rock and roll recording of a Barry Gibb song. Recorded on Leedon Records and named "I'd Like To Leave If I May", radio preferred the flip side. Between 1963 and 1966, Gibb's songs were also recorded by other Australian artists, including Trevor Gordon, Noeleen Batley, Anne Shelton, April Byron, Ronnie Burns and Lori Balmer. Gibb's "One Road" hit No. 2 on the Australia New South Wales Chart and No. 32 on the Kent Music Report charts for Jimmy Little in 1964. His "I Just Don't Like to Be Alone", recorded by Bryan Davies, reached No. 25 on the New South Wales chart in 1964.

In 1966, Gibb won the annual Radio 5KA award for the best composition of the year, "I Was a Lover, A Leader of Men".

=== 1967–1970: return to UK, commercial breakout and worldwide popularity ===
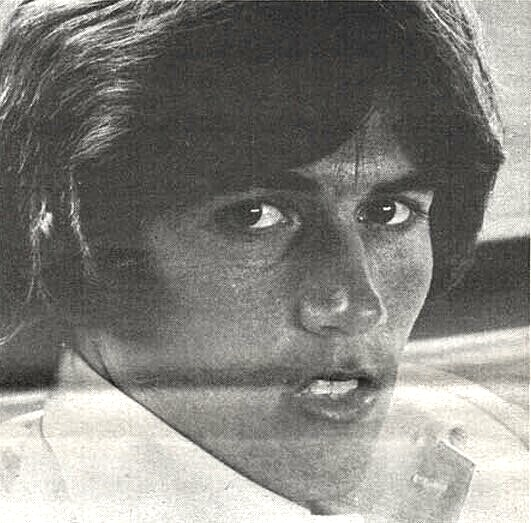
Headshot of Gibb in 27 January 1968 issue of KRLA Beat

The Bee Gees returned to the United Kingdom in early 1967. They passed a live audition with Robert Stigwood on 24 February and later signed to Robert Stigwood Organization. Also on 24 February, "Spicks and Specks" was released by Polydor as a single in the United Kingdom. Stigwood became the Bee Gees' manager. Drummer Colin Petersen and guitarist Vince Melouney joined the group. The result was their first international LP, Bee Gees' 1st. The second single from the album, "To Love Somebody", on which Gibb sings the lead vocal, has become a standard, covered by hundreds of artists.

Around the same time, the Gibb brothers contributed backing vocals on the track "Cowman, Milk Your Cow", a song by Gibb and Robin and sung by Adam Faith.

On 30 March 1967, Gibb was in The Speakeasy Club, a nightclub in London, where he was introduced by Pete Townshend to John Lennon. Lennon was still wearing his outfit for the Sgt. Pepper's Lonely Hearts Club Band photo shoot earlier that day; after a couple of scotch and cokes, Townshend asked Gibb, "Do you want to meet John?" and led him to a room where Lennon was holding court. Townshend said, "John. This is Barry Gibb, from the group the Bee Gees". Lennon replied, "Howyadoin'". "So I met John Lennon's back", Gibb said with a laugh; "I didn't meet his front." In 2010, Gibb said: "It was virtually a closed club and you went downstairs and there was a coffin and if you were someone they knew and you were supposed to go in, the wall would turn around ... and in you would go. There would be [Rolling] Stones lying around all over the place. It was one of those days when I met John Lennon – from the back. It was Pete Townshend who introduced me ... [Lennon said] 'Pleased to meet you', and he carried on talking to his guest."

After many stresses on their personal and professional lives, both Barry and Robin collapsed from nervous exhaustion on a flight from Australia to Turkey in 1967. On 23 December 1967, Barry and Robin left England for Australia. Gibb said: "Due to time difference we arrived on Christmas Day; we missed Christmas Eve altogether!" The pair celebrated Christmas with Stigwood's family.

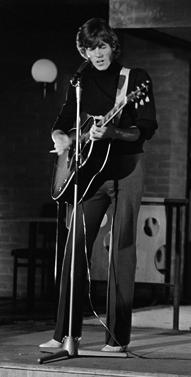
Gibb performing with the Bee Gees in 1968

At the end of 1967, fame was taking its toll, and the group was at odds. At the start of 1968, the Gibbs were vying to influence the musical direction of the group, creating tension in the studio and on stage. Also in 1968, to promote Horizontal the group made their first appearance on US television on The Smothers Brothers Show as well as The Ed Sullivan Show. The group later filmed a TV special, Frankie Howerd Meets the Bee Gees, with Frankie Howerd. His 1968 composition "Only One Woman" (UK No. 5) was the Marbles' most successful single up to date. The Bee Gees were invited by Hollywood manager Lee Hazlewood at his party alongside the members of the Monkees and Honey Ltd. Photos from that event were leaked, and show Gibb talking to actress Angela Cartwright and playing guitar with the members of Honey Ltd. singing along.

In 1969, the Bee Gees released "First of May" as the A-side, with the flip side being "Lamplight", on which Robin sang the lead. Stigwood chose "First of May" to be the A-side. No other songs were released from the album Odessa. Shortly after Robin announced his solo plans, the Bee Gees released their first single without him, "Tomorrow Tomorrow". Barry also worked with Samantha Sang, co-writing and producing two songs "The Love of a Woman" and the B-side "Don't Let It Happen Again" released on Parlophone. He also produced songs for P. P. Arnold, including "Bury Me Down By the River" (released as a single), that the Bee Gees originally recorded for their 1970 album. In the summer of 1969, Petersen left the group, leaving only Barry and Maurice as the Bee Gees. Pentangle drummer Terry Cox replaced Petersen to complete another 12 songs, but only five songs were released on the album.

The film Cucumber Castle, featuring only two Bee Gees after originally including Petersen, aired on BBC2 on 26 December 1970. When the group announced that they had split at the start of December 1969, Gibb spent January 1970 writing songs to record the following month.

=== 1970: debut as a solo artist ===
In February 1970, he started to record his first solo album, The Kid's No Good; he released his first solo single, "I'll Kiss Your Memory", but the rest of the songs that were supposed to be on the album were never released and only appeared in bootlegs. "I'll Kiss Your Memory" did not chart in either the U.K. or U.S. but reached No. 16 in Netherlands in five weeks. Another country ballad, "This Time", was chosen as the B-side. Bruce Eder of AllMusic said the songs on The Kid's No Good were country and sentimental numbers.

In April 1970 the album Cucumber Castle was released four months after the break-up, featuring only Barry and Maurice, as Robin was working on his solo career. For the first time as a solo artist, he appeared on the panel of judges and performed "One Bad Thing" and "The Day Your Eyes Meet Mine" on Miss Teen Princess of the World pageant in Germany in June, his reaction was "I've not appeared on stage for at least a year and three months, and I really miss people". In July 1970, Gibb travelled to Australia to act as compere for Go-Set, and on that occasion, he gave an interview on the magazine which revealed that sixteen months after the Bee Gees' break-up, he was still not ready to argue with his brothers, "Obviously, we're still brothers, but we are no longer as a group".

He considered the song "One Bad Thing" for the second single from his debut album. Atco pressed some copies of it in August 1970 with "The Day Your Eyes Meet Mine" as the B-side. It was distributed to radio stations in Canada and elsewhere, but it was decided to focus on the Bee Gees' reunion single, "Lonely Days", released around August. While Polydor planned to release "One Bad Thing" by 2 October in territories outside North America and Canada. Gibb claimed that not only had he been focusing on writing and recording songs, but he had still hoped to be an actor, "I have already had offers to play different parts but, without appearing swell headed, I haven't found the right part yet". "One Bad Thing" was later given by Gibb to his friend Ronnie Burns, a singer from Australia, and later released it as a single on Festival Records.

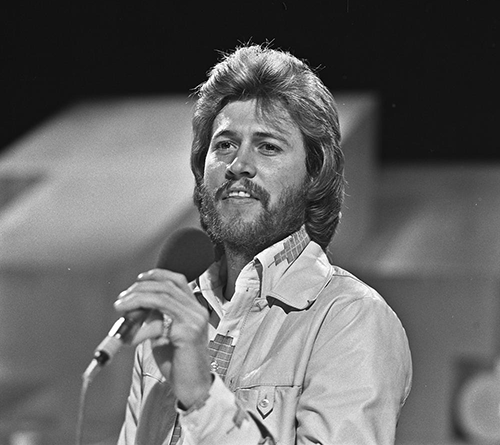
Gibb in 1973 on the Dutch television show TopPop

=== 1970–1974: Bee Gees' reunion ===
In August 1970, the Bee Gees reunited and recorded together again, writing "Lonely Days" and "How Can You Mend a Broken Heart" at their first reunion session.

In 1971, the group released "How Can You Mend a Broken Heart", which was their first American No. 1 hit. In October 1971, Gibb recorded three songs for the Barry Gibb Fan Club. One of the songs, "King Kathy", was released as a single on Lyntone Records. Gibb had remained a constant creative force for the group and, by 1972, had set aside the idea of a parallel solo career and was ready to devote full attention to the band. To Whom It May Concern was the last album recorded fully at IBC Studios and their last album arranged by Bill Shepherd who had worked with the group since 1964. Also in 1972, Gibb moved to Los Angeles to record in the Record Plant studio. In 1973, the Bee Gees moved to Robert Stigwood's RSO Records and released their first singles for Stigwood, "Saw a New Morning" and "Life in a Tin Can". Stigwood was not ready to give up on the group, but he did not believe in the musical direction they were taking. At the suggestion of Jerry Wexler and Ahmet Ertegun of Atlantic Records, Stigwood sent them to work with Atlantic producer and arranger Arif Mardin who produced the next Bee Gees album in 1974. After a United States tour early in 1974, the group started to perform at small clubs in England.

=== 1975–1980: big success for disco works ===
"It came to me in a dream, there was a request by Arif Mardin, who was like an uncle to us, he was a great record producer during the song 'Nights On Broadway,' for the Main Course album, which is previous to the 'Fever' syndrome. And he said, 'Can any of you scream, scream in falsetto.' So, you know, give us an ad lib or a scream at the end. So from screaming, it turned into things like 'blaming it all'."

— Gibb on discovering his falsetto skills, The Larry King Show, 2002

At the start of 1975, the group moved to Miami at the suggestion of Eric Clapton to work on their new album with R&B producer Arif Mardin in Criteria Studios. The first song featuring Gibb's falsetto was 1975's "Nights on Broadway". In 1976, Gibb wrote "I Just Want to Be Your Everything", his brother Andy Gibb's first US No. 1, and provided backup vocals.

During 1976, Gibb met with Vince Melouney and wrote two songs, "Let It Ride" and "Morning Rain", that were never recorded. In November 1977, the film Saturday Night Fever was released and its soundtrack became the best-selling soundtrack of all time. During 1977, Gibb co-wrote "Emotion", which remains Samantha Sang's best-known hit. Gibb and Galuten wrote "Save Me, Save Me" originally recorded by the group Network and later covered by Frankie Valli, Dusty Springfield, Rare Earth, and Teri DeSario. The film Sgt. Pepper's Lonely Hearts Club Band, featuring Gibb as Mark Henderson was shown in July 1978. Between December 1977 and September 1978, seven songs Barry wrote would reach No. 1 in the United States. Andy's third single, "Shadow Dancing", which was credited to all four Gibb brothers, was also a US No. 1 single. In 1978, Gibb wrote a title song to order for their manager Robert Stigwood's film and stage musical Grease and was later recorded by singer Frankie Valli and reached No. 1 in the US. The song contains guitar work by Peter Frampton. In February 1978, he provided background vocals for his composition "Ain't Nothing Gonna Keep Me From You" which featured Teri DeSario on vocals.

After the Bee Gees' successful 1979 Spirits Having Flown Tour to promote the album of the same name, he wrote, produced and sang on almost all of the songs on Andy Gibb's final album, After Dark, released at the start of 1980.

=== 1980–1983: producer for other artists ===
In September 1980, Gibb produced the three new songs on Andy Gibb's first compilation album, Andy Gibb's Greatest Hits. In October 1980, Barbra Streisand's Guilty was released, produced by the Gibb-Galuten-Richardson team. the lead off single, Woman In Love was released in August and within 5 weeks was No. 1 on the US charts. The two songs of which were vocal duets between Streisand and Gibb are "Guilty" a U.S. Top 5, and "What Kind of Fool" also reached the Top 10 in the U.S. and reached No. 1 on the US Adult contemporary chart. In 1981, the Bee Gees released Living Eyes. Songs from the album were not disco and the album was not a commercial success. In 1982, Clive Davis asked Gibb to write for Dionne Warwick, who was on his Arista label. Barry produced Warwick's Heartbreaker. The songs were all written by Gibb except "Our Day Will Come". In August 1983, after Gibb met Kenny Rogers who asked for some songs, Gibb recorded his first demo for Rogers entitled "Eyes That See in the Dark". At that time, Robin was working on his How Old Are You? album with Maurice playing instruments. The other songs intended for Kenny Rogers were written in late 1982, then at the start of 1983, Barry continued to record the demos until April 1983, while also recording songs with the Bee Gees for the film Staying Alive. In August 1983, he produced Rogers' new album Eyes That See in the Dark, which includes the song "Islands in the Stream" by Rogers and Dolly Parton which became one of the best-selling singles in country music.

=== 1983–1986: break from the Bee Gees and switch to solo projects ===
In August 1983, Irving Azoff signed Gibb to the MCA Records for North America. Gibb was signed for a few million dollars to a multi-album deal. Polydor still had rights to Gibb's songs outside North America. In September 1984, his album Now Voyager was released. Two singles from the album included "Shine, Shine", a US Top 40 single that reached the Top 10 in their Adult contemporary charts, and "Fine Line" which was less successful, only reaching No. 50 on the dance charts. The film Now Voyager starring Gibb was directed by Storm Thorgerson, in which Gibb is the protagonist, with actor Michael Hordern as his guide through a confusing world between life and death. The film includes a music video on most of the songs on Now Voyager. A video for "Fine Line" featuring Gibb without his trademark beard and was filmed in black and white.

In 1985, Gibb started to record demos for Diana Ross, for her album Eaten Alive. In the same year, he co-wrote most of the songs on Robin Gibb's album Walls Have Eyes.

In late 1985 and early 1986, he wrote new songs for his next album, though his third album Moonlight Madness was not released and most of the songs on that album was later released in 1988. Producer Randy Jackson plays bass on all of the tracks. Gibb co-wrote three songs for Swedish singer Carola on her album Runaway. Also in 1985, he joined the short-lived supergroup the Bunburys with David English.

=== 1987–2002: later activity ===
In early 1987, the Bee Gees started to record their first album in six years. In June and July 1987, Gibb and Maurice produced Andy Gibb's four new songs; one of them, "Arrow Through the Heart", was released in 2010. In 1987, Gibb co-wrote "Up the Revolution" by Elton John. And in 1988, Gibb recorded two new songs for the Hawks film. In September 1988, the film soundtrack of the film was released by Polydor only in the U.K. The songs were all performed by Gibb except "Chain Reaction" (Diana Ross). The single from the soundtrack, "Childhood Days", reached only No. 60 in Germany.

Around 1990, the Bee Gees recorded High Civilization. In September 1990, Gibb played guitar and produced "Born to Be Loved by You" by Kelli Wolfe, which was released as an unreleased B-side in August 1993. Around 1992, Gibb played guitar on Lulu's "Let Me Wake Up in Your Arms", released in 1993. In 1993, the Bee Gees recorded and released Size Isn't Everything. In 1994, the Bee Gees and Polydor planned a tour to promote Size Isn't Everything, but it was off in February, due to Gibb's trouble with arthritis in the back, right hand and right knee. Gibb co-wrote "I Will Be There", which was recorded as a demo for Tina Turner and released on Turner's album Twenty Four Seven. In 2001, Gibb co-wrote "I Cannot Give You My Love" with Ashley Gibb, which was intended for Cliff Richard. In September 2001, the Bee Gees re-recorded "Islands in the Stream". However, this session featured only Robin and Maurice; Barry did not participate in the session, held at Middle Ear Studios in Miami Beach, Florida. In 2002, Gibb and Michael Jackson recorded "All in Your Name". Also in 2002, Gibb sings background vocals on Michael Bublé's version of the 1971 song "How Can You Mend a Broken Heart".

=== 2003–2012: Maurice's death and semi-retirement of the Bee Gees ===
Maurice died suddenly on 12 January 2003. Ten months later, in November of that year, Gibb produced and contributed backing vocals and guitar to two songs performed by Cliff Richard, "I Cannot Give You My Love" and "How Many Sleeps?"; Maurice's keyboard work from a 2001 demo version was included in this 2003 version. On 2 May 2004, Barry and Robin Gibb received the CBE award at Buckingham Palace; their nephew Adam accepted his father Maurice's posthumous award. Also in 2004, Gibb co-wrote and sang backing vocals on his son Steve Gibb's solo single "Living in the Rain". In January 2005, along with many artists, Gibb and his brother Robin recorded vocal parts for the charity single "Grief Never Grows Old" on behalf of victims of the tsunami in the Indian Ocean on 26 December 2004. In April and May 2005, Barbra Streisand recorded songs for her new album produced by Gibb. In August 2006, two Gibb singles, "Doctor Mann" and "Underworld", were released on iTunes. "Underworld" was featured on the film soundtrack of Arctic Tale but not in the film. On 7 December 2006, Gibb joined 4,500 other musicians in a full-page advertisement in the Financial Times newspaper, calling for the British Government to extend the existing 50-year copyright protection of sound recordings in the United Kingdom. The fair play for musicians advertisement proposed that the copyright be extended to the American standard of 95 years and was a direct response to the Gowers Review (published by the British Government on 6 December 2006), which recommended the retention of the 50-year protection for sound recordings.

In 2007, "Drown On the River" was released as a single on iTunes. The song later appeared on the soundtrack of Deal. Also in the same year, Gibb sang background vocals on Jamie Jo's song "U Turn Me On" and wrote the theme music for ITV's Grease Is the Word. Gibb also appeared as a mentor in season six of American Idol.

On 14 March 2009, Gibb teamed with Olivia Newton-John to present the one-hour finale performance at a star-studded 12-hour live concert at Sydney's Sydney Cricket Ground, part of Sound Relief, a fundraiser to aid victims of the February 2009 Victorian Bushfires that devastated large tracts of heavily wooded and populated south-eastern Australia, where the Gibb family once lived. The concert was televised live nationally across Australia on the Max TV cable network. On 10 July 2009, Gibb was made a Freeman of the Borough of Douglas (Isle of Man). The award was also bestowed upon his brother Robin and posthumously upon his brother Maurice. In late 2009, Barry and Robin announced plans to record and perform together once again as the Bee Gees.

In 2010, Gibb withdrew from a planned appearance on the Gorillaz album Plastic Beach which was released in March. In December 2011, his two songs, "Grey Ghost" and "Daddy's Little Girl" were released. On 21 February 2012, Gibb performed his first solo concert in the U.S. at the Seminole Hard Rock Cafe in Florida. He sang "How Can You Mend a Broken Heart" with Maurice's daughter, Samantha Gibb, who is a singer in her own band. Barry's son Steve was also on stage as lead guitarist and sang a Maurice composition, "On Time". On 20 May 2012, Robin Gibb died, making Barry the sole surviving Gibb brother.

=== 2012–present ===
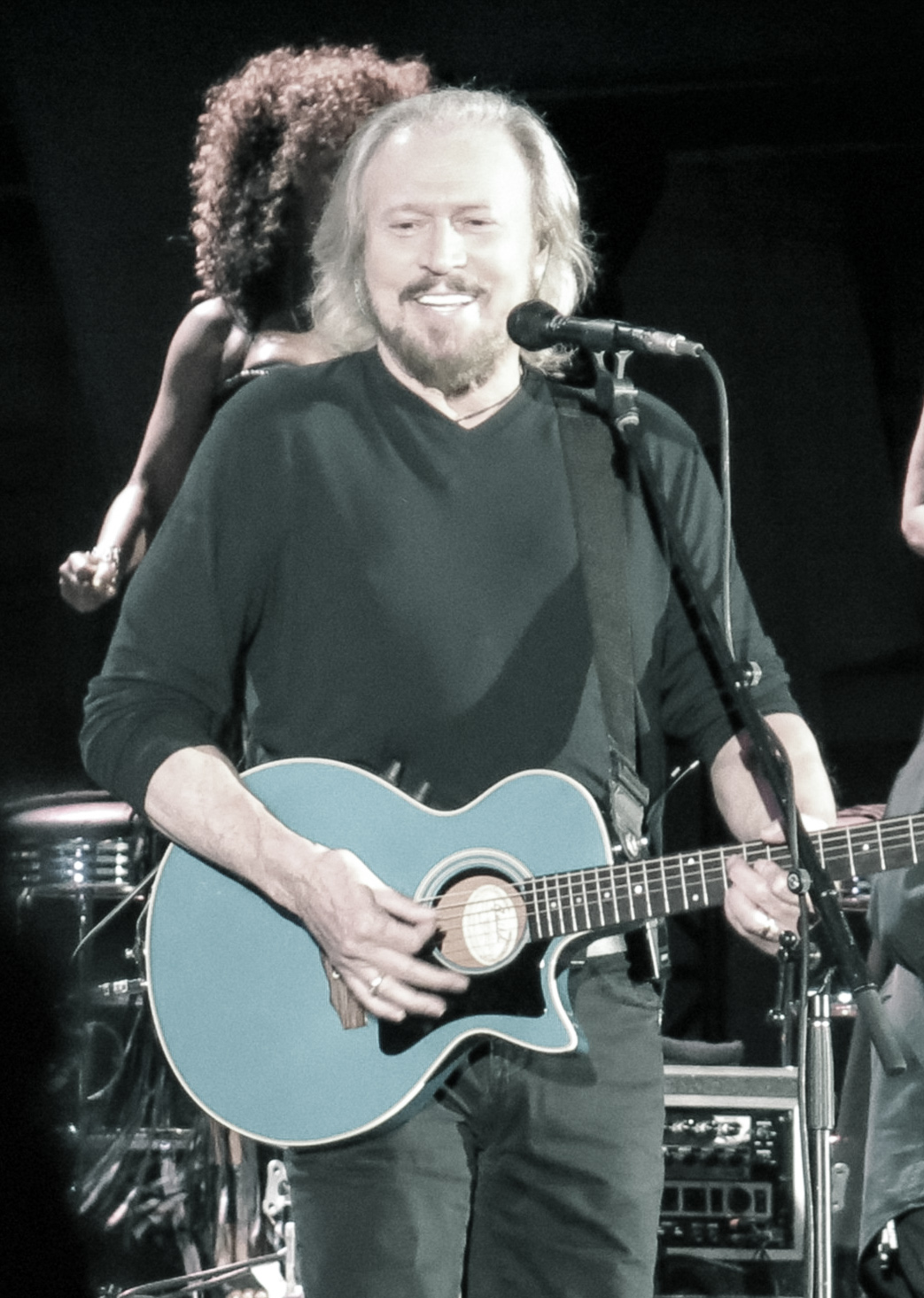
Gibb performing in 2014 at the Hollywood Bowl

Gibb made his debut performance at the Grand Ole Opry on 27 July 2012, performing three songs with Ricky Skaggs. Skaggs later recorded "Soldier's Son" on which Gibb added vocals for Skaggs' album Music to My Ears released in 2012.

He commenced a world tour in 2013 in Australia called Mythology Tour, featuring the Bee Gees anthology set album of the same name. He was joined on stage by his son Steve and Maurice's daughter Samantha. On that tour, for the first time on stage, Gibb performed "Playdown" (1966), "Every Christian Lion Hearted Man Will Show You" (1967), "I Started a Joke" (1969) and "With the Sun in My Eyes" (1968). Also, for the first time, the music video of the Bee Gees' 2001 song "Technicolor Dreams", written by Gibb, was shown before the show began. This short tour inspired Festival Records to release a box set of the Bee Gees' three Australian albums, The Festival Albums Collection, 1965–1967, and a 'best of' compilation of the group's Australian era songs titled Morning of My Life.

On 27 October 2013, Gibb appeared at the Country Music Hall of Fame with Kenny Rogers and Bobby Bare; Gibb performed "Islands in the Stream" with Kelly Lang. In October, Gibb performed at the Grand Ole Opry for the second time with Ricky Skaggs. On 21 December 2013, Barry Gibb made a surprise appearance on the US television show Saturday Night Live at the end of the "Barry Gibb Talk Show" skit with Jimmy Fallon, Justin Timberlake and Madonna. Also appearing that night was Sir Paul McCartney who shared the stage with Gibb during the closing credits where they embraced each other.

On 27 January 2014, Gibb appeared on the American television show Late Night with Jimmy Fallon to announce the start of his first solo tour of the US. He performed "You Should Be Dancing" with help from Fallon's backing band, the Roots. Gibb and Fallon sang some Everly Brothers songs, including "Bye Bye Love" and "Wake Up Little Susie". Gibb also sang "To Love Somebody" as a bonus online performance. On 28 January, Gibb was interviewed by CNN about his brothers and, in that same interview, Gibb talked about Justin Bieber, saying he is "heading for a brick wall". In a Mirror interview with Gibb on 11 July 2014 he said he was still mourning following the death of Robin and credits his wife Linda and Paul McCartney for helping him to recover. Gibb appeared on a McCartney tribute album, The Art of McCartney, released on 18 November 2014 performing "When I'm Sixty-Four". Gibb's friend, country singer TG Sheppard, said in an interview with Gary James that Gibb just moved to Nashville and was going into country music.

On 8 February 2015 at the 57th Annual Grammy Awards, Gibb, along with the group Pentatonix, presented the category of Best Pop Vocal Album. On 26 March 2015, Gibb was one of the headlining acts on a music festival called the Hard Rock Rising Miami Beach Global Music Festival alongside Andrea Bocelli, Gloria Estefan, Flo Rida, Jon Secada and Wyclef Jean.

On 26 June 2016, Gibb was scheduled to perform the "legend" spot at the Glastonbury Festival in England, but pulled out due to a family illness. He did, however, appear with Coldplay as a guest performer singing "To Love Somebody" and "Stayin' Alive".

On 28 June 2016, it was announced that Gibb had signed to Columbia Records and would release his second solo album, In the Now, on 7 October 2016. The album was Gibb's first album with all new material since the Bee Gees' final studio album, This Is Where I Came In (2001). In the Now was co-written by his sons Stephen and Ashley and produced with John Merchant.

On 25 June 2017, Gibb performed the "legend" spot at the Glastonbury Festival in England. He had joined Coldplay on stage during the same festival in 2016.

On 6 November 2020, Gibb announced his latest album entitled Greenfields which is a duets album featuring country artists Dolly Parton, Little Big Town, Alison Krauss and others. The album contains 11 Bee Gees tracks and one unreleased Gibb track, re-imagined as country songs. The song "Words of a Fool" featuring Jason Isbell was released the same day as a preview. The song was originally written by Gibb in 1986 for an unreleased album. Barry was honoured at the 46th Annual Kennedy Center Honors in December 2023. In 2024, Gibb focused his attention on pre-production of the planned Bee Gees biopic, serving as executive producer.

== Personal life ==
Gibb's first marriage was to Maureen Bates, whom he married on 22 August 1966 when he was 19 years old. The couple lived together for only a short time and were divorced in July 1970. At the time they were living in Abbey House, near the Abbey Road Studios in London.

During the taping of the BBC's Top of the Pops in London, Gibb met former Miss Edinburgh Linda Gray. On 1 September 1970 (his 24th birthday), they were married. Together, they have five children, including Stephen. He has seven grandchildren. Gibb and his wife became U.S. citizens in 2009, while retaining their UK citizenship.

In his 11 July 2014 interview with The Mirror, Gibb said he became friends with Michael Jackson: "He would come to Miami and stay in our house. He'd sit in the kitchen and watch the fans outside his hotel on TV, just giggling – 'Hee hee!' He lived upstairs for a while, right before his child-molestation trial. We never discussed the case. We would just sit around and write and get drunk. Michael liked wine – there were a few nights when he just went to sleep on the floor", adding that he misses Jackson.

Gibb owns a home in the UK, but has lived primarily in the US since 1974. In January 2006, Gibb purchased the former home of the late country singers Johnny Cash and June Carter Cash in Hendersonville, Tennessee, US intending to restore it and turn it into a songwriting retreat. The house was destroyed by fire on 10 April 2007 while under renovation, and a new house was built. The property was sold in 2014.

On 10 July 2009, Gibb was made a Freeman of the Borough of Douglas. The award was also bestowed upon his brother Robin and posthumously upon his brother Maurice.

== Influences ==
Gibb's influences when he was in the Rattlesnakes were Tommy Steele, the Mills Brothers, the Everly Brothers, Paul Anka, and Cliff Richard. The Bee Gees acknowledged that they would sing in the style of the Everlys and then add a third harmony; the result was "New York Mining Disaster 1941" (1967). When Gibb heard Roy Orbison's song "Crying", he said: "That was it. To me that was the voice of God."

Gibb also praises the vocal skills of Frankie Valli as one of his influences: "Frankie Valli has become one of the hallmark voices of our generation. He created a style that we all still strive to emulate." Gibb was also influenced by country music as his songs on the 1970 unreleased The Kid's No Good show: "Country music always inspired us. I love Nashville and I love this music. Since my brothers passed, I've been able to be self-indulgent. I've been able to go where I love the music".

== Legacy ==
In 2007 Gibb was ranked by Q magazine at No. 38 on its list of '100 Greatest Singers'.

Gibb had a highly successful career as a member of the Bee Gees, a group near the top of the all-time top-sellers list. When the group was inducted into the Rock and Roll Hall of Fame in 1997, their citation read 'Only Elvis Presley, the Beatles, Michael Jackson, Garth Brooks and Paul McCartney have outsold the Bee Gees.' The trio's contribution to Saturday Night Fever pushed the film's soundtrack past the 50 million mark in sales. It reigned as the top-selling album until Michael Jackson's Thriller. They are the only group in pop history to write, produce and record six straight No. 1 hits.

=== Grammy awards ===
Between his work with the Bee Gees, as an individual artist, and as songwriter/producer, Gibb has six Grammy wins from 15 nominations, plus two honorary Grammy awards.

Year	Association	Category	Nominated work	Result	Ref.
1972	Grammy Awards	Best Pop Vocal Performance by a Duo, Group or Chorus	"How Can You Mend a Broken Heart"	Nominated	
1978	Grammy Awards	Best Pop Vocal Performance by a Group	"How Deep Is Your Love"	Won	
1978	Grammy Awards	Producer of the Year	Bee Gees	Nominated	
1979	Grammy Awards	Album of the Year	Saturday Night Fever	Won	
1979	Grammy Awards	Best Pop Vocal Performance by a Duo or Group	Saturday Night Fever	Won	
1979	Grammy Awards	Best Arrangement of Voices	"Stayin' Alive"	Won	
1979	Grammy Awards	Producer of the Year	Bee Gees	Won	
1979	Grammy Awards	Album of the Year	Grease	Nominated	
1979	Grammy Awards	Record of the Year	"Stayin' Alive"	Nominated	
1979	Grammy Awards	Song of the Year	"Stayin' Alive"	Nominated	
1981	Grammy Awards	Best Pop Performance by a Duo or Group with Vocal	"Guilty"	Won	
1981	Grammy Awards	Album of the Year	Guilty	Nominated	
1981	Grammy Awards	Record of the Year	"Woman in Love"	Nominated	
1981	Grammy Awards	Song of the Year	"Woman in Love"	Nominated	
1984	Grammy Awards	Best Album of Original Score Written for a Motion Picture or a Television Special	Staying Alive	Nominated	
2003	Grammy Awards; Special award of merit	Legend Award	Bee Gees	Won	
2015	Grammy Awards; Special award of merit	Lifetime Achievement Award	Bee Gees	Won	

The three Gibb brothers were appointed Commanders of the Order of the British Empire (CBE) in 2002. On 2 May 2004, Barry and Robin received their awards at Buckingham Palace, along with their nephew Adam, who collected the award on behalf of his father Maurice, who had died in January 2003. Gibb was also awarded a knighthood in the 2018 New Year Honours. He was also made an Honorary Companion of the Order of Australia on 27 January 2022 in the 2022 Special Honours for eminent service to the performing arts as a musician, songwriter and record producer, to the advancement of Australian music artists and to philanthropy. In 2023, he became a Kennedy Center Honoree for contributions to American culture and for being a "pop music pioneer".

Gibb is a prolific songwriter and a fellow of the British Academy of Songwriters, Composers and Authors. In 1977, Gibb saw five of his songs simultaneously enter the Top Ten of the Billboard Hot 100 and, for one week in March, four of the top five songs were written by him. His songs were No. 1 for 27 out of 37 weeks from 24 December 1977 to 2 September 1978. Gibb also holds the record for writing the most consecutive US No. 1 hits, with four successive hits: in 1978, the Bee Gees' "Stayin' Alive" was replaced at number one by Andy's single, "Love Is Thicker Than Water", followed by the Bee Gees' "Night Fever" for their longest run, seven weeks. This was then replaced by the Bee Gees' "If I Can't Have You", recorded by Yvonne Elliman. He is the only male artist to have 10 songs on the 600 biggest songs of the Hot 100 Billboard in its history, having co-written, co-produced or performed them.

As a songwriter, Gibb has had No. 1 songs in the 1960s, 1970s, 1980s, 1990s and 2000s, when "Islands in the Stream" became No. 1 in the UK as the Comic Relief single for 2009. His compositions for the Bee Gees have been recorded by numerous artists, including José Feliciano, Celine Dion, Al Green, Wyclef Jean, Janis Joplin, Jimmy Little, Barry Manilow, Olivia Newton-John, Roy Orbison, Elvis Presley, Kenny Rogers, Diana Ross, Nina Simone, Barbra Streisand, Samantha Sang, Tina Turner, Conway Twitty, Frankie Valli, Luther Vandross, Sarah Vaughan, Jennifer Warnes, Dionne Warwick and Andy Williams. Australian musician David Campbell, praising Gibb, compared the Beach Boys and the Bee Gees: 'And like Brian Wilson, Barry Gibb's melodies made the songs timeless.'

Gibb's solo songs have been recorded by number of artists, including Lou Reizner, Samantha Sang, P. P. Arnold, Ronnie Burns, Jerry Vale and many others. As a record producer, Gibb produced albums for Andy Gibb, Barbra Streisand, Dionne Warwick, Kenny Rogers and Diana Ross.

=== Australian Songwriters Hall of Fame ===
The Australian Songwriters Hall of Fame was established in 2004 to honour the lifetime achievements of some of Australia's greatest songwriters.

Year	Nominee / work	Award	Result
2022	Barry Gibb, Maurice Gibb and Robin Gibb	Australian Songwriters Hall of Fame	inducted

== Solo discography ==
=== Studio albums ===
Year	Album details	Peak chart positions		
Year	Album details	AUS	UK	US
1984	Now Voyager: Released: September 1984; Label: MCA, Polydor	—	85	72
2016	In the Now: Released: October 2016; Label: Columbia	3	2	63
2021	Greenfields: Released: 8 January 2021; Label: Capitol	1	1	15

=== Soundtracks ===
Year	Album details
1988	Hawks: Released: September 1988; Label: Polydor

=== Compilations ===
Year	Album details
2006	The Guilty Demos: Released: 10 October 2006
2006	The Heartbreaker Demos: Released: 10 October 2006
2006	The Eyes That See in the Dark Demos: Released: 10 October 2006
2006	The Eaten Alive Demos: Released: 10 October 2006

=== Unreleased albums ===
Album details
The Kid's No Good
- Recorded: 1970
Moonlight Madness
- Recorded: 1986

=== Singles ===
Year	Single	Peak chart positions							Certifications (sales thresholds)	Album
Year	Single	UK	AUS	US	US Dance	US AC	GER	NED	Certifications (sales thresholds)	Album
1970	"I'll Kiss Your Memory"	—	—	—	—	—	—	16		Singles only
1978	"A Day in the Life"	—	—	—	—	—	—	—		Sgt. Pepper's Lonely Hearts Club Band (soundtrack)
1980	"Guilty" (with Barbra Streisand)	34	37	3	—	5	15	12	BPI: Silver; RIAA: Gold	Guilty (Barbra Streisand album)
1981	"What Kind of Fool" (with Barbra Streisand)	—	—	10	—	1	—	—		Guilty (Barbra Streisand album)
1984	"Shine, Shine"	95	87	37	—	8	45	—		Now Voyager
1984	"Fine Line"	—	—	—	50	—	—	—		Now Voyager
1988	"Childhood Days"	—	—	—	—	—	60	—		Hawks (soundtrack)
2006	"Doctor Mann"	—	—	—	—	—	—	—		Singles only
2006	"Underworld"	—	—	—	—	—	—	—		Singles only
2007	"Drown On the River"	—	—	—	—	—	—	—		Singles only
2011	"All in Your Name" (with Michael Jackson)	—	—	—	—	—	—	—		Singles only
2011	"Grey Ghost"	—	—	—	—	—	—	—		Singles only
2011	"Daddy's Little Girl"	—	—	—	—	—	—	—		Singles only
2020	"Butterfly"	—	—	—	—	—	—	—		Greenfields
"—" denotes releases did not chart

== See also ==
- List of British Grammy winners and nominees
