= Half-elf =

Offspring of an elf and a human from Norse mythology onwards

A half-elf is a mythological or fictional being, born of an immortal elf and a mortal human. They are often depicted as very beautiful and endowed with magical powers; they may be presented as torn between the two worlds that they inhabit. Half-elves became known in modern times mainly through J. R. R. Tolkien's Middle-earth writings but have origins in Norse mythology. A half-elf appeared in Lord Dunsany's 1924 book The King of Elfland's Daughter.

In Middle-earth, half-elves are the children of Elves and Men, and can choose either Elvish immortality or the mortal life of Men. The elf-maidens Lúthien and Arwen in Tolkien's works both chose mortality to be with the Men that they loved. Scholars have noted that this enabled Tolkien to explore several key themes, including love and death, time and immortality. As a Catholic, he believed that Men, freely choosing to let go, gain release from the world's limitations; whereas if they tried to hold on to life and material things, they would end in darkness. His Elves – except for half-elves – were unable to gain this release. In On Fairy-Stories Tolkien wrote that since men write fairy-stories, these concern the escape from death; and conversely that Elves would tell human-stories about the escape from deathlessness. Since their popularisation by Tolkien, half-elves have become widely known in role-playing games, and in turn in video games and spin-off films. The role-playing game Dungeons & Dragons features its own race of half-elves, including the character Tanis Half-Elven.

== Norse mythology ==
In Norse mythology, a half-elf is the offspring of an elf and a human. Major examples include Skuld and Högni. Högni was a hero in Thidreks saga, born to a human queen when an elf visited her while the king was away. Skuld was a Danish princess, as told in Hrólf Kraki's saga. King Helgi, sleeping alone as he had not been invited to King Adils's wedding, let in a ragged person on a midwinter night. As she slept, he saw she was a radiantly beautiful woman dressed in a silk gown. She told him he had freed her from a curse and asked to leave. He asked her to stay and marry him, and she agreed. They slept together. She told him they would have a child, and asked him to visit the child the next winter at the harbour. The King forgot to do so, but three years later the woman, an elf, returned and left a daughter at his door. She told him that the child's name was Skuld, which means "what you should do". She said that the King would gain the reward for breaking the curse, but that the King's people would suffer as the King had not done as she had asked. She never came back, but Skuld was always angry.

The scholar Hilda Ellis describes Skuld as evil, recalling that in the saga, Skuld used magic to raise an army against Hrólf, her half-brother. As quickly as Hrólf's warriors kill Skuld's men, they spring up, fighting more strongly than ever. Leading the fight for Hrólf, Bodvar Bjarki calls Skuld's men draugar, 'undead', saying "they are grimmest to deal with after they are dead, and against this we have no power." Ellis comments that Skuld is one of the Norse women involved in "everlasting battle" who share the names of Valkyries, females who guide the souls of the dead. She notes that Skuld is "said to be the child of an elf-woman", but that it is difficult "to decide how accurately the term [elves] is used", as its meaning shifts between the sagas and the Edda poems.

Högni too is "essentially a demonic character", his name connected to the German Hexe, 'witch', and to the English "hag"; the scholar Alexander Krappe sees his being the son of an elf as fitting in to that role, while his daughter Hildegund similarly has "certain magical qualities", such as awakening fallen warriors.

== Lord Dunsany ==
Perhaps the earliest published half-elf in modern literature is the character Orion in Lord Dunsany's 1924 The King of Elfland's Daughter. The lord of Erl sends his son, Alveric, to fetch the King of Elfland's daughter, Lirazel, as his bride; the couple have a son, Orion. Lirazel, pining for Elfland, returns there. Alveric and his father search for her helplessly. Lirazel now longs for her mortal husband and half-elven son. The King of Elfland changes Erl into a part of Elfland, and the family live forever in a timeless realm.

In 1977, two members of the folk rock band Steeleye Span (Bob Johnson and Pete Knight) created a concept album also named The King of Elfland's Daughter, inspired by Lord Dunsany's book. Christopher Lee appears as the narrator and the King of Elfland.

== Tolkien's Middle-earth ==
In J. R. R. Tolkien's Middle-earth, the Half-elven (Sindarin singular Peredhel, plural Peredhil, Quenya singular Perelda) are the children of the union of Elves and Men. Of these, the most significant were the products of couplings between the Eldar (the Elves who followed the Call to Valinor) and the Edain (the Men of the Three Houses of early Men who allied themselves with the Eldar in their war against Morgoth). Three recorded unions of the Edain and Eldar generated descendants: Idril and Tuor; Lúthien and Beren; and Arwen and Aragorn. The first two couples wed during the final part of the First Age of Middle-earth, while the third married at the end of the Third Age (some 6500 years later). The third couple descended not only from the first two couples, but also from the twins Elros and Elrond, who chose mankind and elvenkind respectively—thereby severing their fates and those of their descendants. In Appendix A of The Return of the King, Tolkien notes that by the marriage of Arwen and Aragorn "the long-sundered branches of the Half-elven were reunited and their line was restored". The second union was the only one of the three marriages in which the Elf involved (Idril) did not become mortal; instead Tuor was joined to the Elves. In all these cases, the husband was a mortal Man, while the wife was Elven.

=== Beren and Lúthien ===
The first of these was between the mortal Beren, of the House of Bëor, and Lúthien, daughter of the Elf Thingol, king of the Sindar, and Melian, a Maia. Beren died in the quest for the Silmaril, and in despair, Lúthien's spirit departed her body and made its way to the halls of Mandos. Mandos allowed them a unique fate, and they were re-bodied as mortals in Middle-earth, where they dwelt until their second deaths. Their son Dior, heir of the Sindarin kingdom of Doriath and of the Silmaril, was thus one-quarter Elvish by blood and one-quarter Maian, and half-human. He was killed while still young, when the sons of Fëanor sacked Doriath. Dior's wife was Nimloth, a Sindarin Elf, and with her he had three children, Elwing and two sons (thus, half-elven but not between Edain and Eldar, men and Elves of the highest blood).

=== Tuor and Idril ===
The second marriage of Men and Elves in the First Age was between Tuor of the House of Hador, another branch of the Edain, and Idril Celebrindal, an Elf, though half Noldorin and half Vanyarin in ancestry. Their son was Eärendil. After the fall of Gondolin, Eärendil also escaped to the Mouths of Sirion, and married Elwing who was also half-elven. They had twin sons, Elrond and Elros.

=== Aragorn and Arwen ===
Uniquely, Eärendil and Elwing, together with their sons Elrond and Elros, were granted their choice of fates: to be counted as Elves (free to dwell in the blessed Undying Lands for as long as Arda endures) or to be counted as Human (entitled to the Gift of Men whereby, through death, their spirits are freed to enter the unknown beyond Arda). Should this Choice not have been granted, they, like all other Half-Elves, would have been automatically mortal. (Note: The latest version of Tolkien's text was in The Lost Road, which states: "[ Manwë:] Now all those who have the blood of mortal Men, in whatever part, great or small, are mortal, unless other doom be granted to them; but in this matter the power of doom is given to me. This is my decree: to Earendel and to Elwing and to their sons shall be given leave each to choose freely under which kindred they shall be judged." (Note: Tolkien 1987, pp. 326–327) Christopher Tolkien further stated "It is to be observed that according to the judgement of Manwe Dior Thingol's Heir, son of Beren, was mortal irrespective of the choice of his mother." (Note: Tolkien 1987, pp. 334–335)) Elros chose to be counted among mortals, and became Tar-Minyatur, the first king of Númenor. He finally took his death (for those kings had the freedom and grace to die at will) at the age of five hundred. The descendants of Elros were not given this choice, but their lifespan was several times that of ordinary Men. In later times the Númenórean kings, descendants of Elros, regretted their forefather's choice, and this helped lead to the Downfall of Númenor. Elrond chose to be counted among the Elves, joining the court of Gil-galad until the end of the Second Age. (Note: Tolkien 1977 ch. 24 "Of the Voyage of Eärendil and the War of Wrath") He also founded Rivendell in the Second Age. (Note: Tolkien 1977 "Of the Rings of Power and the Third Age") He married the Elf Celebrían, daughter of Celeborn and Galadriel, and sailed into the West at the conclusion of the War of the Ring. (Note: Tolkien 1955 Appendix B "The Tale of Years", "The Third Age") (Note: Tolkien 1955 book 6, ch. 9 "The Grey Havens") The children of Elrond were also given choice of kindred, (Note: Tolkien 1955 Appendix A, (i) Númenor.) and therefore Arwen could choose to be counted among the Edain even though her father hoped she would accompany him to Elvenhome in the West. But she chose otherwise, marrying Aragorn II Elessar, king of the Reunited Kingdom, at the start of the Fourth Age, and bringing noble elvish blood into his dynasty. He ruled for 120 years, choosing to die at a great age for a man, but while still in full health. She died alone at the age of 2,901 years, grieving the brevity of her mortal happiness. (Note: Tolkien 1955 Appendix A (v) The Tale of Aragorn and Arwen)

=== Line of the Half-elven in Middle-earth ===
Half-elven family tree (Note: Tolkien 1977, "Of the Rings of Power and the Third Age": Family Trees I and II: "The house of Finwë and the Noldorin descent of Elrond and Elros", and "The descendants of Olwë and Elwë") (Note: Tolkien 1955, Appendix A: Annals of the Kings and Rulers, I The Númenórean Kings)

Melian the Maia	Thingol of the Teleri	House of Bëor	House of Haleth	House of Hador	Finwë of the Noldor	Indis of the Vanyar	Olwë of the Teleri
Barahir	Belegund	Hareth	Galdor	Fingolfin	Finarfin	Eärwen
Lúthien	Beren	Rían	Huor	Húrin	Turgon	Elenwë
Dior	Nimloth	Tuor	Idril
Eluréd	Elurín	Elwing	Eärendil	Celeborn	Galadriel
Elros	Elrond	Celebrían
22 Kings of Númenor and Lords of Andúnië
Elendil
Isildur	Anárion
22 Kings of Arnor and Arthedain	27 Kings of Gondor
Arvedui	Fíriel
15 Dúnedain; Chieftains
Aragorn	Arwen	Elladan	Elrohir
Eldarion	daughters

Colour key:
Colour	Description
	Elves
	Men
	Maiar
	Half-elven
	Half-elven who chose the fate of Elves
	Half-elven who chose the fate of mortal Men

=== Other lines ===
According to "the tradition of [the] house" mentioned in The Lord of the Rings, the line of Princes of Dol Amroth originated from the union of Imrazôr the Númenórean, a Prince of Belfalas, (Note: Tolkien 1980, Introduction, Part Three, II: "Cirion and Eorl and the Friendship of Gondor and Rohan", note 39, p. 316.) and Mithrellas, a Silvan Elf and companion of Nimrodel, an Nandorin Elf from Lothlórien. (Note: Tolkien 1980, "History of Galadriel and Celeborn", p. 248.) They had two children: a boy Galador and a girl Gilmith, though it is said that Mithrellas later vanished in the night. Galador, according to this tradition, became the first Prince of Dol Amroth. Tolkien initially worked on a genealogical table linking Imrazôr's children with Imrahil, but eventually abandoned it. The claim of elvish heritage figures in the perception of Prince Imrahil among the people of Minas Tirith, illustrated by the following line of dialogue: "Belike the old tales speak well; there is Elvish blood in the veins of that folk, for the people of Nimrodel dwelt in that land once long ago". (Note: Tolkien 1955 "The Siege of Gondor", p. 98.) Legolas, an Elf of Mirkwood, believed as much about Prince Imrahil's alleged heritage upon meeting him during the events of The Return of the King. (Note: Tolkien 1955 book 5, ch. 4 "The Siege of Gondor") He remarked that "long since the people of Nimrodel left the woodlands of Lórien, and yet still one may see that not all sailed from Amroth's haven west over water", (Note: Tolkien 1955 "The Last Debate", p. 148.) though the matter is probed no further.

In The Hobbit reference is made to a rumour among Hobbit folk that a Took ancestor of Bilbo Baggins had long ago taken a "fairy" (i.e. Elf) wife, but the allegation is immediately dismissed as a simplistic explanation for the sometimes atypical behaviour of the Took clan. (Note: Tolkien 1937, ch. 1 ""An Unexpected Party") Even if hobbits have some elvish blood, however, they are "endearing rather than frightening", unlike other half-human hybrids such as Dracula.

In The Book of Lost Tales (published in two parts), the young Tolkien originally intended Eärendil, then spelled Earendel, to be the first of the Half-elven. (Note: Tolkien 1984b book 2, ch. 5 "The Tale of Eärendel") Early versions of The Tale of Beren and Lúthien had Beren as an Elf. (Note: Tolkien 1984b book 2, ch. 1 "The Tale of Tinúviel") The earliest version of the tale of Túrin Turambar had Tamar, the character Tolkien later renamed Brandir, as a Half-elf; Tolkien mentioned this in a way that implied he did not consider Half-elven descent especially remarkable at the time he wrote that story. (Note: Tolkien 1984b book 2, ch. 2 "Turambar and the Foalókë")

=== Interpretations ===
The Tolkien scholar Richard C. West notes the resemblance between the half-elves Arwen and Lúthien, and analyses Arwen's understanding of her fateful choice, between love for Aragorn and mortality on the one hand, and her father's wishes and immortality on the other. West analyses the scene at the camp on Weathertop where Aragorn recounts to the hobbits in poetry and prose the tale of Beren and Lúthien, with West highlighting Aragorn's words and "pensive mood" as he tells them that Lúthien "chose mortality, and to die from the world, so that she might follow [Beren]" and that "together they passed, long ago, beyond the confines of this world" and that she "alone of the Elf-kindred has died indeed and left the world, and they have lost her whom they most loved". West speculates that Aragorn may be thinking here of the consequences of what will happen should Arwen marry him, and later states that he finds "the lonely death of Arwen the most moving tragedy within [The Lord of the Rings]". A similar conclusion regarding Aragorn's feelings at Weathertop is drawn by the scholar of medieval English literature John M. Bowers in his work on the influence of Geoffrey Chaucer on Tolkien. Bowers, looking at both the Weathertop scene and 'The Tale of Aragorn and Arwen', states that like certain pilgrims in Chaucer's Canterbury Tales, Aragorn's stories of his ancestors "open a window into his private desires and fears".

The scholar of English literature Anna Vaninskaya studies how Tolkien uses fantasy to examine the issues of love and death, time and immortality. Given that Tolkien's Elves are immortal, they face the question of death from a unique vantage point. Sarah Workman writes that in the Tale of Aragorn and Arwen, Arwen's mourning of Aragorn serves to overcome what Peter Brooks called (she writes) the "meaningless", interminable nature of immortality. Workman quotes Brooks's statement that "all narration is obituary" and states that it is in that conception that Tolkien valued Arwen's fate: it is Arwen's "mourning gaze that allows for the transmission of Aragorn's memory", or in Tolkien's words which she quotes, "And long there he lay, an image of the splendour of the Kings of Men in glory undimmed".

Critics including the Polish scholar of religion in literature and film, Christopher Garbowski, note that while Tolkien contrasts Elves and Men throughout The Lord of the Rings, he introduces the conceit that an Elf may marry a Man on condition of surrendering her immortality, something that happens exactly twice in Middle-earth: with Lúthien, and then with Arwen. (Note: Tolkien 1993, Part Four. Athrabeth Finrod ah Andreth, pp. 303–366)

The scholar of English literature Catherine Madsen notes the reflection of mortality in the "fading" of Middle-earth from the enormous powers like Morgoth and Elbereth that battled in the First Age. She writes that "Aragorn is a hero and a descendant of heroes, but he is brought up in hiding and given the name of Hope [Estel]; Arwen possesses the beauty of Lúthien, but she is born in the twilight of her people and her title is Evenstar; these two restore the original glories only for a little while, before the world is altered and 'fades into the light of common day'". (Note: Madsen is here quoting from William Wordsworth's Ode on Intimations of Immortality, line 76.) Rateliff, writing on the theme of the evocation of loss in Tolkien's works, describes the 'Gift of Men' as being "to accept loss and decay as essential parts of the world" and draws parallels with other writings by Tolkien: "The Elves cling to the past and so are swept away with it; in a fallen world, acceptance of the inevitability of death is the only way to pass beyond the world's limitations, for Brendan or Niggle or Arwen."

The medievalist Verlyn Flieger wrote that nobody knows where Men go to when they leave Middle-earth, and that the nearest Tolkien came to dealing with the question was in his essay On Fairy-Stories "where, after speculating that since 'fairy-stories are made by men not by fairies', they must deal with what he called the Great Escape, the escape from death. He went on to the singular assertion that 'the Human-stories of the elves are doubtless full of the Escape from Deathlessness'." Flieger suggests that two of the "human stories" of Tolkien's Elves really focus on this kind of escape, the Tale of Beren and Lúthien and the Tale of Aragorn and Arwen, where in both cases a half-elf makes her escape from deathlessness. Shippey comments that "the themes of the Escape from Death, and the Escape from Deathlessness, are vital parts of Tolkien's entire mythology." In a 1968 broadcast on BBC2, Tolkien quoted French philosopher Simone de Beauvoir and described the inevitability of death as the "key-spring of The Lord of the Rings". (Note: As described by Armstrong (1998) and Lee (2018), Tolkien stated: "human stories [are] always about one thing aren't they? Death: the inevitability of death" and then pulled a newspaper cutting from his pocket and read out the following quote from de Beauvoir's A Very Easy Death (1964): "There is no such thing as a natural death. Nothing that happens to man is ever natural, since his presence calls the whole world into question. All men must die, but for every man his death is an accident, and even if he knows it and consents to it, an unjustifiable violation.") In their annotated and expanded edition of Tolkien's essay (Tolkien On Fairy-stories), Flieger and textual scholar Douglas A. Anderson provide commentary on 'the Escape from Deathlessness' passage, referencing Tolkien's views in a 1956 letter, that:

The real theme [of The Lord of the Rings] for me is .. Death and Immortality: the mystery of the love of the world in the hearts of a race [Men] 'doomed' to leave and seemingly lose it; the anguish in the hearts of a race [Elves] 'doomed' not to leave it, until its whole evil-aroused story is complete. But if you have now read Vol. III and the story of Aragorn [and Arwen], you will have perceived that. (Note: Carpenter 2023, #186 to Joanna de Bortadano (drafts), April 1956)

Flieger remarks further that by attaching herself to men's lives and deaths, Lúthien is running against the current of elven life, but at the same time, by undergoing death and darkness Beren and she manage to come to the light. What is more, Flieger writes, their union creates a new race, the half-elven, who have the privilege of choosing either fate, and "new hope for both races". She notes that Tolkien described the story as "Release from Bondage", meaning death, release from deathlessness, and explains "Through death, men can let go; in their deathlessness, elves cannot. The half-elven can also be released from bondage, freed from the earth, if they wish. Tolkien makes no promises; what's to come is still unsure." In her view, this is the Catholic Tolkien's key point, that being able to let go means trusting in faith. Holding on to life, or to physical treasures like the Silmaril which gets Thingol killed, is "folly". Thingol was in the light of the Two Trees, but by grasping Middle-earth, Lúthien, and finally the Silmaril, he journeys into and ends in darkness. It is the opposite of Lúthien's journey.

== In role-playing games ==
Both Tolkien's The Lord of the Rings (1954) and Dunsany's The King of Elfland's Daughter (1924) greatly increased popular awareness of half-elves. As a result, half-elves have become common in other fantasy writings and role-playing games, the best-known being the 1974 Dungeons & Dragons. Half-elves are also featured in the role-playing game Pathfinder.

=== Dungeons & Dragons ===
Dungeons & Dragons has featured its own race of half-elves as a player character option in multiple editions of the game. Josh Williams of Screen Rant stated that "half-elves are popular because they're a great choice for those wanting to play as a fantasy race without stepping too far away from humanity". Williams commented that "half-elves struggle to fit in" when growing up but "thanks to being born of two worlds, half-elves are perfect for players wishing to be the charismatic diplomat of the group". Gus Wezerek, for FiveThirtyEight, reported that of the 5th Edition "class and race combinations per 100,000 characters that players created on D&D Beyond from" August 15 to September 15, 2017, half-elves were the third most created at 10,454 total, preceded by elves (16,443) and humans (25,248). The three most popular class combinations with the half-elf were bard (1,808), warlock (1,401) and rogue (1,325). Wezerek noted "some of the common character choices can be explained by the game's structure of racial bonuses". Matthew Byrd, for Den of Geek in 2023, also highlighted that half-elves have "stats/attributes" reflective of two races which offer "some unique role-playing options" and that mechanically the race has "benefited from a pretty generous base stat distribution and useful base skills". However, the terminology and the way in which the game structures inherited mechanical traits for characters with mixed ancestry, such as half-elves, has been criticised. As a result, Dungeons & Dragons is moving away from having the half-elf as a distinct race in the game and it is not listed in the Player's Handbook (2024) as a character option.

A well-known character from Dungeons & Dragons fiction is Tanis Half-Elven. Tanis is a player character in the spin-off 1988 video game Advanced Dungeons & Dragons: Heroes of the Lance. He is a miniature lead figure in Ral Partha's Dragonlance Heroes boxed figures set, described by a critic as "Tanis is dressed as a typical ranger in leathers and fur-lined shirt and boots. The vest has a design worked into it, as does his dagger scabbard. The belt has a pouch attached. Tanis's face is finely chiseled with a neatly groomed beard, although he appears gaunt. His left hand clutches his bow." Tanis is played by Michael Rosenbaum in the 2008 animated film Dragonlance: Dragons of Autumn Twilight. Tanis, like all Dragonlance heroes, is a flawed character; Lauren Davis of io9 comments that he is "consumed by his inability to fit completely into either the human or elven worlds". Rob Bricken, also of io9, writes that Tanis is "A bastard (in the technical sense) half-elf who doesn't truly belong in the world of either race; he's a capable leader of the group although he's often plagued by self-doubt. He left Qualinesti, a land of elves, because their leader's daughter Laurana was in love with him and her father was having none of it. He's currently in love with a swordswoman named Kitiara, who's the half-sister of Caramon and Raistlin."
