= Treat Me Like a Lady =

Treat Me Like a Lady may refer to:

- "Treat Me Like a Lady" (Five Star song) 1990
- "Treat Me Like a Lady" (Zoe Birkett song) 2003
- "Treat Me Like a Lady", song written by Bob Crewe, single from California Nights (Lesley Gore album) 1966, covered by The Tages
- "Treat Me Like a Lady", by P.P. Arnold The First Cut – The Immediate Anthology
- "Treat Me Like A Lady", single sung and written by Sherry Bryce 1974
- "Treat Me Like a Lady", single by Maxine Brown (soul singer), written by Tony Camillo 1972
- "Treat Me Like a Lady", by Romeo's Daughter Delectable (album)
- "Treat Me Like a Lady", by Anneke van Giersbergen Drive (Anneke van Giersbergen album)
- "Treat Me Like a Lady", by Eternal Eternal (Eternal album)

== See also ==
- Like a Lady (disambiguation)
- Treat Her Like a Lady (disambiguation)
