= The King of Elfland's Daughter =

1924 novel by Lord Dunsany

- First edition, 1924
- Author: Lord Dunsany
- Language: English
- Genre: Fantasy
- Publisher: G. P. Putnam's Sons
- Publication date: 1924
- Publication place: United Kingdom
- Media type: Print (hardback)
- Pages: 301 pp

The King of Elfland's Daughter is a 1924 fantasy novel by Anglo-Irish writer Lord Dunsany. It is widely recognized as one of the most influential and acclaimed works in all of fantasy literature. Although the novel faded into relative obscurity following its initial release, it found new longevity and wider critical acclaim when a paperback edition was released in 1969 as the second volume of the Ballantine Adult Fantasy series.

It has also been included in the more recent Fantasy Masterworks series. While seen as highly influential upon the genre as a whole, the novel was particularly formative in the (later-named) subgenres of fairytale fantasy and high fantasy.

== Plot summary ==
The lord of Erl is told by the parliament of his people that they want to be ruled by a magic lord. Obeying the immemorial custom, the lord sends his son Alveric to fetch the King of Elfland's daughter, Lirazel, to be his bride. He makes his way to Elfland, where time passes at a rate far slower than the human world, and wins her. They return to Erl and have a son, Orion, but in the manner of fairy brides of folklore, she fits uneasily with his people. She returns to the waiting arms of her father in Elfland, and her lovesick husband goes searching for her, abandoning the kingdom of Erl and wandering in a now-hopeless quest. However, Lirazel becomes lonesome for her mortal husband and son. Seeing that she is unhappy, the King of Elfland uses a powerful magic to engulf the land of Erl. Erl is transformed into a part of Elfland, and Lirazel and her loved ones are reunited forever in an eternal, enchanted world.

During the course of the novel, the King of Elfland uses up all of the three powerful magic spells (known as runes) that he had been reserving for the defense of his realm.

== Characters ==
Alveric
son of the ruler of Erl. Commanded by his father to bring magic to Erl, he travels to Elfland to find Lirazel and wed her, and attempts to convert her to Christdom. He later forms his "company of six" to return to Elfland to find Lirazel after the Elf King's first rune brought her back to Elfland, but he cannot find the border of twilight to enter Elfland.
Lirazel
Princess of Elfland (the King of Elfland's daughter). She marries Alveric and births a son, Orion. She longs for, and is returned to Elfland (blown away with the leaves) after the Elfking casts the first rune, but later longs to return to her husband and son in Erl. The Elf King uses his third rune to grant her wish.
Orion
son of Alveric and Lirazel, who is nursed by the witch Ziroonderel. As a boy he is influenced by Threl's stories and becomes a hunter – taught to do so by Oth. Though he begins as a deer hunter, he soon learns to hunt the unicorns that cross the border of twilight from Elfland to Earth, in order to graze.
Elf King
ruler of Elfland and loving father of Lirazel; his name is not given in the story. He possesses three master runes (powerful magic spells that dissipate once cast, thus rendering them no longer usable). Over the course of the story he employs all three runes.
Ziroonderel
witch in Erl who aids Alveric by making him a magic sword. She later is the infant Orion's nursemaid.
Lurulu
troll sent by the Elf King to deliver a rune that will return Lirazel to Elfland. He later becomes Orion's whipper-in, and lures other creatures of Elfland into Erl. He and the brown trolls aid Orion by controlling his hounds, and they live in a pigeon roost while in Erl.
Grizzled Troll
old troll, grizzled from a period he spent on Earth, where time moves faster than in Elfland. He attempts to warn the other brown trolls from following Lurulu to Earth by issuing warnings that doing so will cause them to age, but Lurulu's humorous counter-appeal breaks down the Grizzled Troll's argument.
Old Leatherworker
helps Alveric by making a scabbard for his magic sword. He is aware of the "border of twilight" between Earth ("the fields we know") and Elfland.
A Fox
helps the troll Lurulu retrieve Lirazel, by directing Lurulu toward the "haunts of men". (Foxes are accustomed to travel across the "border of twilight" between "the fields of men" and Elfland.) Called "Noman's Dog" by the fairies.
The Freer
pious Christian man in Erl, who weds Alveric and Lirazel, but curses all magic and the creatures of Elfland.

=== Parliament of Erl ===
The twelve-member Parliament meets at the blacksmith's forge to drink mead and discuss matters

Narl
the blacksmith who hosts the Parliament
Guhic
farmer who is concerned about the presence of magic in Erl
Oth
hunter who teaches Orion hunting skills
Threl
wise man whose stories of the woods inspire Orion to become a hunter
Vlel
master ploughman

=== The company of six ===
The companions of Alveric in the search for his lost wife, Lirazel

Niv
a witless lad. Alveric appoints him master of encampment because he is the least sane member of the group.
Rannock
a lover
Thyl
young dreamer of songs
Vand
a shepherd, initially chosen by Alveric as master of encampment, but disqualified due to Vand's sanity
Zend

== Critical reception ==
Although the novel fell into obscurity after its initial release, it found a new readership when Ballantine Books re-issued it as part of their Adult Fantasy series in June 1969. The novel has since become widely recognized as one of the most influential and most praised of the genre. Many critics, including L. Sprague de Camp, described it as being on par with The Lord of the Rings in terms of its quality and influence. Arthur C. Clarke felt that the novel helped cement Dunsany as "one of the greatest writers of this century".

The novel's reputation has continued to grow in the ensuing decades. In his review of the 1999 edition for The Magazine of Fantasy & Science Fiction, Charles de Lint praised the novel as superlative: "It's not simply the beauty of the language, the astute eye for character, the hint of humor, or even the spell of legendry and wonder, but Dunsany's unique combination of all of the above. Even read today, with all the fantasy novels I've read, his work remains fresh and exuberant". Gahan Wilson also praised Elfland's Daughter lavishly, calling it "likely Dunsany's masterpiece" and concluding "that may well be the same as saying it could be the very best fairy story ever written".

Other reviewers have been more guarded in their praise. E. F. Bleiler wrote that the novel included "many stylistic brilliances, but the story suffers from too many shifts of attention". Jo Walton commented that it "is probably best described as good but odd. [Dunsany] isn't at his best writing characters, which gets peculiar at novel length. What he could do, what he did better than anyone, was to take poetic images and airy tissues of imagination and weight them down at the corners with perfect details to craft a net to catch dreams in. It's not surprising he couldn't make this work for whole novels, when as far as I know, nobody else has ever quite made it work in prose".

== Adaptations ==
Two members of Steeleye Span (Bob Johnson and Pete Knight) wrote and produced a 1977 concept album The King of Elfland's Daughter, inspired by the book. The singing talents of Frankie Miller (as Alveric), Mary Hopkin (as Lirazel), P. P. Arnold (as the Witch), and Alexis Korner (as a troll) are featured on the album, and the voice of Christopher Lee as the narrator and the King of Elfland. The musicians included Nigel Pegrum, Herbie Flowers, Ray Cooper and Chris Spedding.

The game designer Gavin Norman cites Dunsany's novel as one of the inspirational media behind his creation of the Dolmenwood fantasy role-playing game. Furthermore, Norman's Dolmenwood adventure module Winter's Daughter contains a quest possibility that parallels Alveric's quest to journey to Elfland to find his wife Lirazel.
