= King Kathy =

Song by Barry Gibb

from the album Barry Gibb Fan Club
- B-side: "Summer Ends" and "I Can Bring Love"
- Released: 1971
- Recorded: October 1971
- Genre: Folk
- Length: 3:43
- Label: Lyntone
- Songwriter(s): Barry Gibb
- Producer(s): Barry Gibb

"King Kathy" is a song written, performed and produced by Barry Gibb. The song was included on Barry Gibb Fan Club. It was written in 1970 while he wrote other songs for his debut album The Kid's No Good. It was released in 1971 on Lyntone Records.

On this track, Barry sings and play guitar and was recorded around October 1971 in London along with "Summer Ends" and "I Can Bring Love". Like "I Can Bring Love" the song starts with a false start.

== Track listing ==
- All tracks were written by Barry Gibb.

No.	Title	Length
1.	"King Kathy"	3:43
2.	"Summer Ends"	4:46
3.	"I Can Bring Love"	2:35

== Personnel ==
- Barry Gibb — lead vocals, acoustic guitar
