= One Bad Thing =

"One Bad Thing" is a song written by Barry Gibb in 1969 with Maurice Gibb. It was recorded by Barry Gibb for his unreleased debut solo LP The Kid's No Good. The song was originally credited to Barry and Maurice, but the other versions have been credited to Barry alone.

== Recording ==
"One Bad Thing" was recorded by Barry on 23 March 1970 for his first album The Kid's No Good, on the same day as another song, "Happiness". The album was not released. He proposed "One Bad Thing" would be the second single from the album (after "I'll Kiss Your Memory") with its B-side "The Day Your Eyes Meet Mine". Polydor planned to release the song as a single on 2 October 1970, and Atco Records pressed some copies, which were distributed to radio stations in Canada and elsewhere, but it was discontinued in favour of "Lonely Days", a new Bee Gees release. Barry sang lead, background and harmony vocals on the song. The song features a country-ish guitar. In the summer of 1970, he performed "One Bad Thing" on a German television show with "The Day Your Eyes Meet Mine". In a short interview, he explained that both songs would be his next single.

=== Personnel ===
- Barry Gibb — lead vocals, harmony vocals, backing vocals, guitar
- Bill Shepherd — orchestral arrangement
- Uncredited — lead guitar, bass, drums, horns

== Cover versions ==
- Wildwood recorded and released the song, and it was the band's only single. Its B-side was "High Above the Town", originally by Rob Van Beek.
- New Horizon recorded the song, released on Bell Records in April 1971.
- Australian singer Ronnie Burns covered the song; it was released as a single with a b-side, "1000 Years", written by Rick Springfield. Burns' version reached #12 in Adelaide and #45 in Perth (Australia).
- Irish vocal group the Freshmen covered the song which was released as a single on 28 May 1971 on CBS Records.
