= P. P. Arnold =

American singer (born 1946)

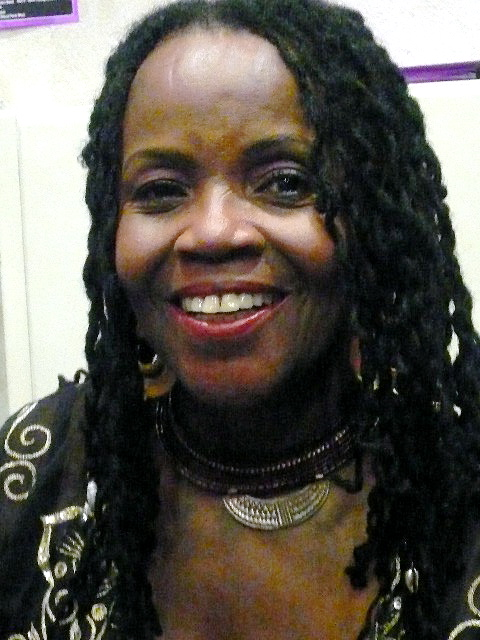
- Arnold in 2007

Background information
- Also known as: Pat Arnold
- Born: Patricia Ann Cole; October 3, 1946 (age 80); Los Angeles, California, U.S.
- Genres: Soul, pop
- Occupation: Singer
- Years active: 1965–present
- Labels: Phi-Dan, Immediate
- Website: pparnold.com

Patricia Ann Cole (born October 3, 1946), known professionally as P. P. Arnold, is an American-born soul singer, long resident in the United Kingdom. She rose to prominence in the 1960s after performing as an Ikette with the Ike & Tina Turner Revue, before launching a successful solo career in the U.K.

Arnold is best known for her recordings of "The First Cut Is the Deepest" and "Angel of the Morning" from her albums The First Lady of Immediate (1968) and Kafunta (1968). She collaborated with artists including Small Faces, Nick Drake, Peter Gabriel, and Roger Waters. Arnold has continued to record and perform, releasing the albums The Turning Tide (2017) and The New Adventures of… P.P. Arnold (2019). In addition to her music career, she has appeared in the musical theatre productions Starlight Express in 1984 and Once on This Island in 1994.

== Early life and family ==
Arnold was born into a family of gospel singers, and performed as a vocal soloist for the first time when she was four years old. Her family lived in the African-American Watts neighborhood of Los Angeles. Arnold began singing at the Full Gospel Baptist Church on Avalon Boulevard in Los Angeles.

She dropped out of high school at 15 to marry and had her first child the following year; by age 18, she had two children, Kevin and Debbie. Her husband, David, did not work, so Arnold took on two jobs to support her family. By day, she worked as a clerk-typist at a clothing firm, and in the evenings, she worked in an egg factory separating egg whites from yolks for a local bakery.

== Career ==
=== 1960s ===
In 1965, Maxine Smith, an ex-girlfriend of her brother had contacted her with an offer. Smith and her friend Gloria Scott had arranged an audition for the three of them to replace the original Ikettes, the dancer/singer troupe that had provided the vocal and dance accompaniments for the Ike & Tina Turner Revue. The three young women were offered the job on the spot, Smith persuaded Arnold to attend a concert in Fresno that night before making a final decision. When she arrived home at 6:00 the next morning, Arnold's furious husband hit her. She left him immediately, and after placing her children in the care of her parents, joined the Ike & Tina Turner Revue.

As an Ikette, Arnold sang lead on the 1966 single "What'cha Gonna Do (When I Leave You)", backed by Brenda Holloway and Patrice Holloway for Phil Spector's Phi-Dan Records. Arnold sang backing vocals on the Ike Turner produced side of the album River Deep – Mountain High. She also appeared in the 1966 concert film, The Big T.N.T Show. Arnold quit the Ike & Tina Turner Revue in the fall of 1966 after their tour with the Rolling Stones in the UK. She remained in London to establish a solo career, with the encouragement of Mick Jagger. Arnold noted the difference between how she had been treated in America and how she was received in England, saying, "A young black woman on her own in America in a white environment would not have been treated as well as I was in England." Her friendship with Jagger helped her land a solo contract with Immediate Records, a label founded by Rolling Stones manager Andrew Loog Oldham.

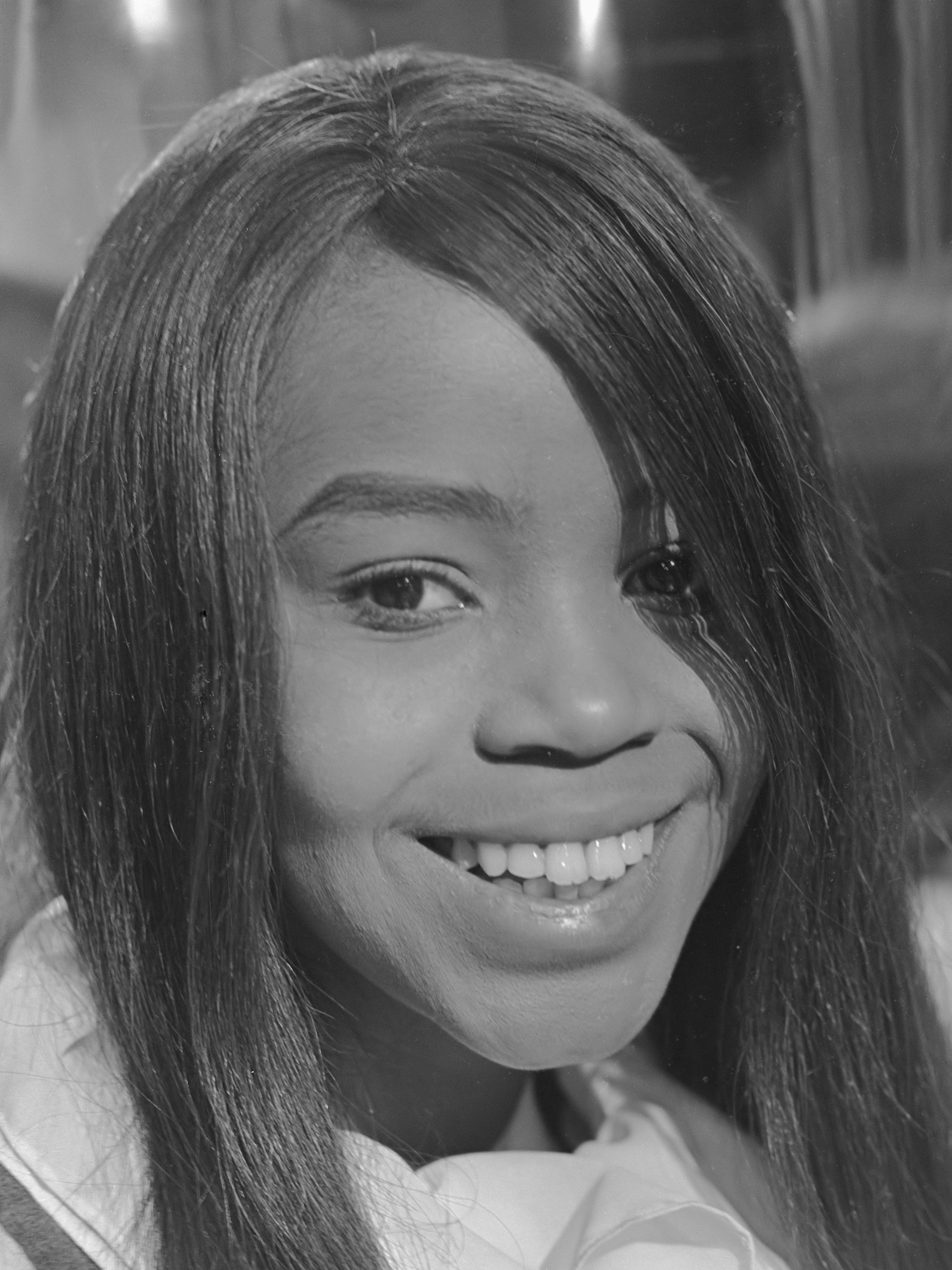
Arnold in 1967

Arnold enjoyed several major British hits on Immediate Records, including songs written for her by Paul Korda, who wrote "The Time Has Come" and released the solo album The First Lady of Immediate. She also recorded songs written by Steve Marriott and Ronnie Lane from labelmates Small Faces, who backed her on several recordings; Arnold had a brief romantic liaison with Marriott in 1967. She toured with the Small Faces during 1967–68, made several TV appearances with them, and featured as backing vocalist on two of their biggest hits, "Itchycoo Park" and "Tin Soldier". During this period she scored several hits, including the original version of Cat Stevens' song "The First Cut Is the Deepest" and "Angel of the Morning", plus the Marriott-Lane song "(If You Think You're) Groovy".

In 1968, she released the ambitious solo album Kafunta, with orchestral arrangements by John Paul Jones and including self-penned songs and covers such as "Angel of the Morning" and "Eleanor Rigby." Other credits in this period include her duet with Rod Stewart on the single "Come Home Baby" (produced by Mick Jagger on Immediate Records, with Ron Wood on guitar, Keith Richards on bass, Nicky Hopkins on electric piano, Keith Emerson on Hammond organ and the Georgie Fame Brass Section), as well as Chris Farlowe's version of the Motown standard "Reach Out (I'll Be There)" (with Albert Lee on guitar and Carl Palmer on drums).

Her first backing band, the Blue Jays, had been inherited from American soul singer Ronnie Jones and included former Bluesbreakers guitarist Roger Dean. This was followed by the Nice, whose line-up was Keith Emerson on organ, who had just quit the VIPs (later to be known as Spooky Tooth), David O'List on guitar, Lee Jackson on bass and Ian Hague on drums.

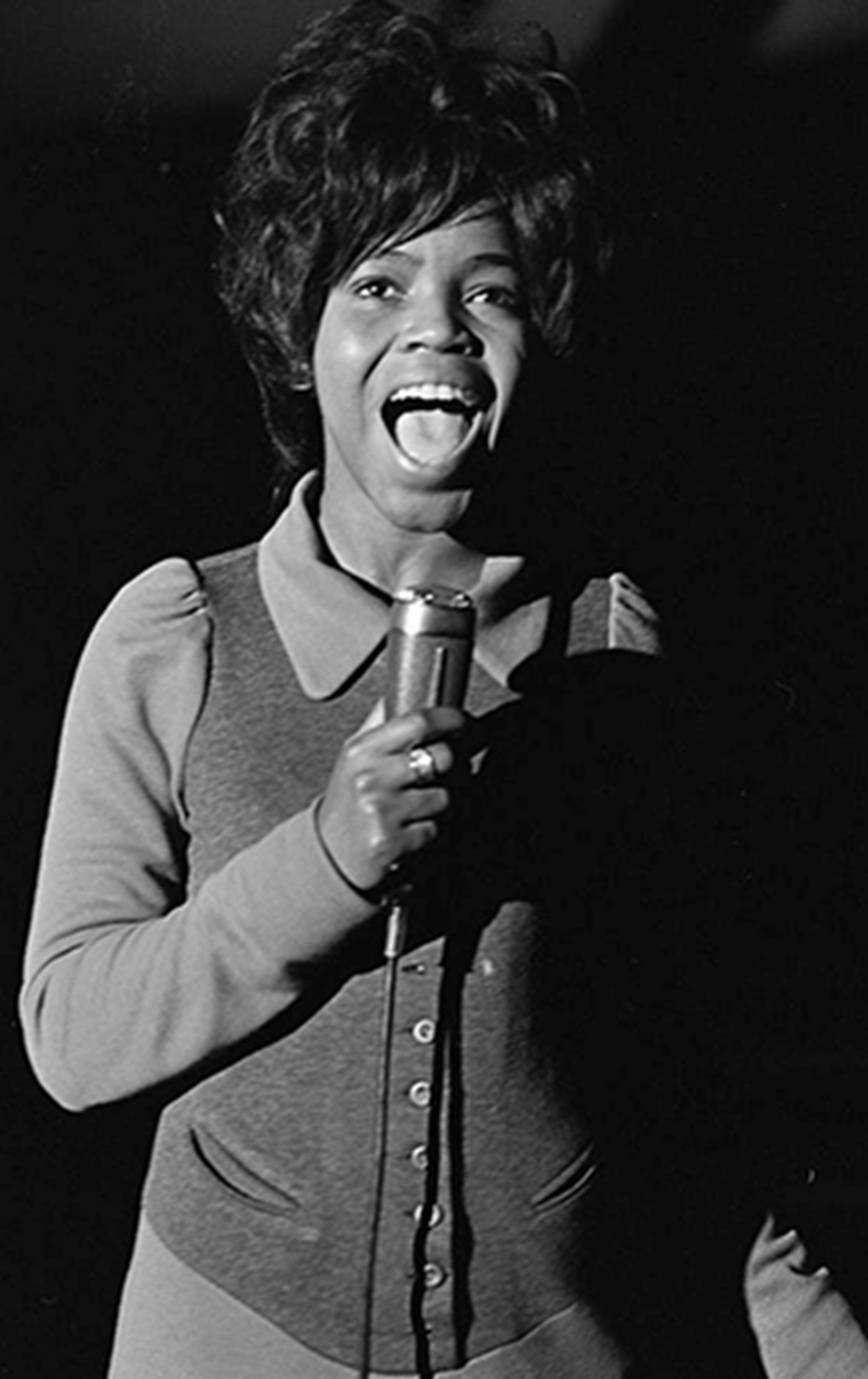
Arnold performing on Dutch TV in 1968

After the collapse of Immediate Records in the late 1960s, Arnold signed a production contract with the Robert Stigwood Organisation and released two singles on the Polydor label, produced by Barry Gibb, but a planned album with Gibb was never completed. Between 1969 and 1970, she recorded eleven songs which were produced by Gibb himself but only two of the songs "Bury Me Down By the River" and "Give a Hand, Take a Hand" were released. In February 1970, she sang harmony vocals on the song "Born" which was included on Gibb's debut solo album The Kid's No Good.

=== 1970s ===
In 1970, Arnold moved to the musical stage, appearing alongside P. J. Proby in the rock musical Catch My Soul. She then formed a new backing band that included the future members of Ashton, Gardner and Dyke, plus Steve Howe, who would soon join Yes. During this period, she renewed her association with Steve Marriott, recording and touring with his new band Humble Pie (Rock On), as well as contributing session musician backing vocals for many notable UK and US recordings including the original 1970 album recording of the rock musical Jesus Christ Superstar, Nick Drake's "Poor Boy", and recordings by Dr. John, Graham Nash, Gary Wright, Manassas, Nektar, Jimmy Witherspoon, Nils Lofgren and Eric Burdon.

She toured with Eric Clapton, who also produced a number of unreleased sessions with her; during these sessions she met American bassist Fuzzy Samuels of Crosby, Stills, Nash & Young, and they subsequently became involved romantically and had a son, Kodzo. In 1974, she sang on Freddie King's album Burglar.

Feeling out of place in the rapidly changing British music scene of the mid-1970s, Arnold and Samuels returned to her hometown of Los Angeles. While they were living there, Arnold's relationship with Samuels ended; just two weeks after the split, her daughter Debbie was killed in a car accident. After her daughter's death, Arnold withdrew from public life for some time, not re-emerging until 1978. At this time, she was reunited with Barry Gibb, who wanted to complete the never-finished solo album for her. In the event, Arnold was able to release these recordings only in 2017, on her album The Turning Tide.

=== 1980s–1990s ===
In 1981, Arnold returned to the US, moving to Hollywood, but returned to England the following year to raise her younger son there. She began working with leading British reggae band Steel Pulse and returned to the charts in both the UK and Australia on the hit 1983 cover version of the Staple Singers "Respect Yourself", recorded with British electropop group Kane Gang, which reached No. 21 in Britain and No. 19 in Australia.

In 1984, she returned to the stage in the cast of the musical Starlight Express as Belle the Sleeping Car, after which she worked with a number of noted British acts including Boy George as well as working on several film soundtracks. Weeks before beginning a tour with Billy Ocean, her legs were badly injured in a car accident. She went ahead with the Ocean tour, at first appearing on crutches, but her injuries eventually forced her to leave the tour after ten weeks. Without a record contract and unable to play live, Arnold survived by doing sessions for advertising jingles.

In 1986, Arnold returned to the rock scene, featuring prominently as a backing vocalist on Peter Gabriel's worldwide hit "Sledgehammer", released as a single from Gabriel's 1986 album So. Arnold also provided backing vocals for another song released as a single from So, "Big Time", and has claimed her backing vocals can be heard towards the end of Gabriel and Kate Bush's duet on So, "Don't Give Up. That same year Arnold provided backing vocals on Icehouse song "Into The Wild". An alternate techno-style version titled "Wild" from the Icehouse album Full Circle is listed in the end credits of the 1996 film Space Jam..

This was followed by a successful collaboration with The Beatmasters on the retro-styled acid house hit "Burn It Up", which reached No. 14 in Britain in October 1988, and became her third hit to spend 10 weeks or more on the UK singles chart. "Burn It Up" was included on the Beatmasters' album Anywayawanna. During the late 1980s and 1990s, Arnold resumed an active career as a session vocalist, and her credits in this period included The KLF ("What Time Is Love?", "3 A.M Eternal"), Nina Hagen, Roger Waters (Amused to Death), and Graham Parker. In 1989, she reunited with her old friend Steve Marriott to record his solo album 30 Seconds to Midnite, which proved to be their final collaboration; Marriott died in a house fire in 1991. She then worked with the UK Hardcore group Altern 8 on their single "E-Vapor-8" in 1992, and was featured in the video.

In 1994, she joined the cast of the award-winning musical Once on This Island as Erzulie, beautiful Goddess of Love. While the production was playing in Birmingham she met leading UK band Ocean Colour Scene, one of the new wave of latter-day mod groups who (like their mentor Paul Weller), idolised the Small Faces. In 1995, Arnold joined forces with Primal Scream to record a blistering cover version of the Small Faces' song "Understanding", the opening track of the various artists Small Faces tribute album Long Agos and Worlds Apart. Following her earlier meeting with Ocean Colour Scene with whom Arnold would eventually form a close friendship she appeared on their 1997 album "Marchin Already" which reached Number 1 in the UK album charts lending backing vocals to single "Travellers Tune" and duet lead vocals alongside Simon Fowler on 1998 single "It's a Beautiful Thing".

=== 2000s ===
Arnold joined forces with Chaz Jankel, former pianist with Ian Dury and the Blockheads. This was followed by an invitation to tour widely with Roger Waters. She was a backup vocalist on his 1999–2002 tour In the Flesh (also on the CD and DVD of the same name), as well as the 2006–2008 tour, Dark Side of the Moon Live. Her version of "The First Cut Is the Deepest" was featured in the soundtrack of the 2012 movie Seven Psychopaths.

In 2001, Arnold released her full Immediate Records discography on the album The First Cut (The Immediate Anthology). It includes her famous albums The First Lady of Immediate and Kafunta in addition to several singles. A chance encounter at a party led to Blow Monkeys frontman Dr Robert on their 2007 album Five in the Afternoon. In 2009, she toured the UK with Geno Washington and Jimmy James on the Flying Music 'This Is Soul Tour' and has since toured around the UK on her own. In 2012, she toured the UK with Maddy Prior, Jerry Donahue, Dave Swarbrick, and Thea Gilmore. In 2013, Arnold participated in the project The Band of Sisters with David Mindel, a British songwriter, jingle writer and composer of music for film and television. It brought together Arnold, Mim Grey, Tessa Niles, Lynda Hayes, Stevie Lange and Mandy Bell on the album called Issues. In 2015, Arnold embarked on her first solo tour in Cape Town, South Africa. Arnold was then featured in the Small Faces musical All or Nothing at the Vault Theater Waterloo in which her love affair with Steve Marriott was documented.

=== 2017–present: Return with new solo album ===
In 2017, P. P. Arnold finally released her Heritage recordings in album. The Turning Tide is a collection of songs recorded between 1968 and 1970. Produced by Barry Gibb and Eric Clapton, the album was aborted and remained unfinished until 2017. Also in 2017, she celebrated her 50th Anniversary in the music industry with a fall tour that coincided with the release of The Turning Tide. She also sang backing vocals alongside Madeline Bell, for the first track "Woo Sé Mama" on Paul Weller's album "A Kind Revolution" released May 2017.

In 2018, Arnold went on two tours in Australia: in May she went on first ever solo tour of Australia and New Zealand backed by Tim Rogers, the front man for the rock band You Am I, and Davey Lane and Rusty Hopkinson, also members of the band; in November she returned to Australia for the second tour, The Return of PP Arnold, where she performed with You Am I once again with James Black & The Wolfgramm Sisters. she also was a special guest on the RocKwiz Tour 2019, where she performed with Rockwiz Orchestra.

In August 2019, Arnold released her fourth solo album The New Adventures of...P. P. Arnold. The album was recorded and produced by life-long P. P. enthusiast, OCS star and Paul Weller band guitarist Steve Cradock at his Kundalini Studio in Devon, and follows on—after a 51-year gap – from the singer's first two solo albums on Immediate Records, The First Lady of Immediate and Kafunta, as well as a more recent compilation of previously unreleased material from the late '60s and '70s, The Turning Tide. The album spans from classic orchestral soul to house music, ending with a 10-minute reading of Bob Dylan's poem "The Last Thoughts On Woody Guthrie". Arnold explained: "I've got this huge catalogue of records I've sung on, but I have only released two albums – and they've stood the test of time."

In October 2019, Arnold toured the UK to support the album.

On 8 May 2020, The Fratellis released their single "Strangers In The Street" on which Arnold performed lead vocals.

In 2024, Arnold released a live album, Live In Liverpool.

== Personal life ==
Arnold became pregnant at the age of 15 which resulted in her first marriage. She had two children, Kevin and Debbie, with her husband, who was abusive, and she left him to become an Ikette while her mother cared for her children. Her daughter Debbie died in the mid-1970s in a car accident.

Arnold married her second husband, Jim Morris, at Guildford Town Hall in Surrey in 1968. Barry Gibb was the best man at their wedding. Morris worked for Robert Stigwood as a driver and assistant. Arnold met him through Kim Gardner. They divorced after two years, but remained friends.

Arnold has a son, Kodzo, from her relationship with musician Calvin "Fuzzy" Samuel. Kodzo is musical director for Jessie J and Jess Glynne. He is credited as a songwriter on Arnold's 2019 album, The New Adventures of... P. P. Arnold.

== Discography ==
=== Studio albums ===
- The First Lady of Immediate (Immediate, 1968)
- Kafunta (Immediate, 1968)
- Five in the Afternoon – Dr. Robert & P. P. Arnold (Curb, 2007)
- The Turning Tide (Kundalini Music, 2017, recorded late 1960s to early 1970s)
- The New Adventures of... P. P. Arnold (Ear Music, 2019)
- Live In Liverpool (Ear Music, 2024)
- The Immediate Sessions (Charly, 2025 compilation)

=== Compilations ===
- P. P. Arnold / Chris Farlowe (1976)
- P. P. Arnold Greatest Hits (1977)
- Chris Farlowe / P. P. Arnold : Legendary (1979)
- Angel... (1986)
- The P. P. Arnold Collection (1988)
- Kafunta – The First Lady of Immediate: Plus (1988)
- The First Cut (1998)
- The Best Of (1999)
- Rod Stewart 1964–1969 (2000) - Rod Stewart - "Come Home Baby"
- The First Cut (The Immediate Anthology) (2001)
- A Little Misunderstood: The Sixties Sessions (2001) - Rod Stewart - "Come Home Baby"
- Can I Get a Witness (2001) - Rod Stewart & The Steampacket - "Come Home Baby"
- Immediate Pleasure (2002) - Various Artists - compilation album of Immediate Records with the song "Come Home Baby"
- Angel of the Morning (2006)
- The Best of P. P. Arnold - The First Cut Is the Deepest (2006)
- The Best of P. P. Arnold (2007)
- P. P. Arnold (2008)

=== Singles ===
==== Charting singles ====
Title	Year	Peak chart positions
Title	Year	UK
"The First Cut Is the Deepest"	1967	18
"The Time Has Come"	1967	47
"(If You Think You're) Groovy"	1968	41
"Angel of the Morning"	1968	29
"A Little Pain"	1985	93
"Burn It Up" (with Beatmasters)	1988	14
"Evapor-8" (with Altern-8)	1992	6
"It's a Beautiful Thing" (Ocean Colour Scene with P. P. Arnold)	1998	12
"Different Drum"	1998	80
"Don't Burst My Bubble"/"Come Home Baby" (with Small Faces, Rod Stewart & P. P.)	2005	93

=== Other appearances ===
- "What'cha Gonna Do (When I Leave You)" (1966) – The Ikettes – lead vocals
- River Deep – Mountain High (1966) – Ike & Tina Turner – backing vocals
- "Tin Soldier" (1967) – Small Faces – backing vocals
- The Art of Chris Farlowe (1967) – Chris Farlowe's Thunderbirds – with Albert Lee and Carl Palmer
- Jesus Christ Superstar (1970 album)
- Looking On (1970) – The Move – backing vocals with Doris Troy on "Feel Too Good"
- Rock On (1971) – Humble Pie, with the Soul Sisters, Doris Troy and Claudia Lennear
- Bryter Layter (1971) – Nick Drake – chorus with Doris Troy on "Poor Boy"
- The Sun, Moon & Herbs (1971) – Dr. John – chorus with Mick Jagger, Doris Troy, Shirley Goodman, Tami Lynn, & Bobby Whitlock
- Songs for Beginners (1971) – Graham Nash – chorus on "Military Madness"
- Footprint (1971) – Gary Wright – with George Harrison, Klaus Voormann, Mick Jones, Alan White, Doris Troy, Nanette Newman, etc.
- Down the Road (1973) – Stephen Stills' Manassas
- Down to Earth (1974) – Nektar
- Cry Tough (1976) – Nils Lofgren
- Playmates (1977) – Small Faces
- The King of Elfland's Daughter (1977) – Bob Johnson and Peter Knight – sings "Witch"
- Survivor (1977) - Eric Burdon
- "Will You Love Me Tomorrow" (1980) duet with Andy Gibb
- Electric Dreams (1984) – lead vocals on "Electric Dreams"
- So (1986) – Peter Gabriel – chorus on "Sledgehammer" and "Big Time"
- Shining, Real Life, Real Answers (1987) - The Dolphin Brothers
- 30 Seconds to Midnite (1989) – Steve Marriott
- Street (1991) – Nina Hagen
- 3am Eternal (1991) – KLF – vocals on the 'Stadium House' version
- Amused To Death (1992) – Roger Waters – chorus on four songs
- Long Agos And Worlds Apart – A Tribute To the Small Faces (1995) – Various Artists – lead vocals on "Understanding" with Primal Scream
- Portraits of Bob Dylan (1999) – Steve Howe – lead vocals on "Well, Well, Well"
- Standing on the Shoulder of Giants (2000) – Oasis
- In the Flesh – Live (2000) – Roger Waters
- Flickering Flame: The Solo Years Volume 1 (2002) – Roger Waters
- Five in the Afternoon (2007) – Dr. Robert
- Seven Psychopaths (2012) – Original Soundtrack – features "The First Cut Is the Deepest"
- Poison Vine (2025) & Way It's Gotta Be (Oh Yeah) (2025) - Cast's Yeah Yeah Yeah
