= Summer Ends =

Song by Barry Gibb

from the album Barry Gibb Fan Club
- Released: 1971
- Recorded: October 1971
- Genre: Acoustic
- Length: 4:46
- Label: Lyntone
- Songwriter(s): Barry Gibb
- Producer(s): Barry Gibb

"Summer Ends" is a song written and performed by Barry Gibb in 1970 in the sessions of his debut solo album The Kid's No Good, but this song was not included. Recorded on 15 February and finished on 20 February with "I'll Kiss Your Memory", "The Victim" and "Moonlight".

He re-recorded "Summer Ends" around October 1971 with "King Kathy" and "I Can Bring Love" for his EP called Barry Gibb Fan Club. The opening chord was E. He recorded the song, with only his acoustic guitar.

In 1972, this song was recorded by the band Company and was released for the first time on Playboy Records. Their version was sung by David Stuart, Jack Moran and Joe Croyle.
