= The First Cut – The Immediate Anthology =

The First Cut - The Immediate Anthology

Compilation album by P.P. Arnold
- Released: 2001
- Genre: Soul
- Label: Sanctuary Records, Immediate Records
- Producer: Andrew Loog Oldham, Mike Hurst, Mick Jagger

The First Cut – The Immediate Anthology is a compilation album by P.P. Arnold. It includes all her recordings for Immediate Records from 1966 to 1968: two albums, The First Lady of Immediate (1967) and Kafunta (1968), plus singles and rarities. The Small Faces provide the instrumental music on "(If You Think You're) Groovy". Mick Jagger produced "Though It Hurts Me Badly", "Am I Still Dreaming?" and "Treat Me Like a Lady", backed by The Nice.

== Track listing ==
1. "Everything's Gonna Be Alright" (Andrew Loog Oldham, David Skinner)
2. "Life Is But Nothing" (Andrew Rose, David Skinner)
3. "The First Cut Is the Deepest" (Cat Stevens)
4. "Speak to Me" (Arthur Greenslade, Mike Hurst, Andrew Loog Oldham)
5. "The Time Has Come" (Paul Korda)
6. "If You See What I Mean" (Mike Hurst)
7. "(If You Think You're) Groovy" (Steve Marriott, Ronnie Lane)
8. "Though It Hurts Me Badly" (Arnold)
9. "Something Beautiful Happened" (Paul Korda)
10. "Born to Be Together" (Barry Mann, Phil Spector, Cynthia Weil)
11. "Am I Still Dreaming?" (Arnold)
12. "Treat Me Like a Lady" (Arnold)
13. "Would You Believe" (Jeremy Paul)
14. "Angel of the Morning" (Chip Taylor)
15. "Letter to Bill" (Mark)
16. "Kafunta One"
17. "God Only Knows" (Brian Wilson, Tony Asher)
18. "Eleanor Rigby" (John Lennon, Paul McCartney)
19. "Yesterday" (John Lennon, Paul McCartney)
20. "It'll Never Happen Again" (Tim Hardin)
21. "Kafunta Two"
22. "As Tears Go By" (Mick Jagger, Keith Richards, Andrew Loog Oldham)
23. "Kafunta Three"
24. "To Love Somebody" (Robin Gibb, Barry Gibb)
25. "Dreamin'" (Arnold)
26. "Kafunta Four"
27. "Welcome Home" (Chip Taylor)
28. "Is This What I Get for Loving You" (Phil Spector, Gerry Goffin, Carole King)
