= Born (song) =

Song by Barry Gibb

from the album The Kid's No Good
- Released: Unreleased
- Recorded: 22 February 1970; IBC Studios, London
- Genre: Blues rock, R&B
- Length: 3:54
- Songwriter: Barry Gibb
- Producer: Barry Gibb

"Born" is a song written and performed by Barry Gibb that was included on his originally unreleased debut album, The Kid's No Good in 1970. On the Ladybird version of the album, the song was the 12th track. It was one of the first songs he recorded for his first solo album. The song's style was closer to the 1971 song "Everybody Clap" by Lulu.

== Recording ==
It was recorded on 22 February 1970 along with "A Child, A Girl, A Woman", "Mando Bay", "Clyde O'Reilly" and "Peace in My Mind". The song was covered by P.P. Arnold twice; the first was recorded on 4 April 1970 along with "Happiness" (also a Barry Gibb song), as well as cover versions of "You've Made Me So Very Happy" and "Spinning Wheel", the session was produced by Gibb himself, the second version was recorded on 10 June 1970. The second recording is called "Born to Be Free" in the tape library, Gibb's version contains the line 'born to be free', and that second recording was the last session of Arnold produced by Gibb.

The musicians who played lead guitar and drums on Gibb's version were not credited. The harmony on the Gibb recording was sung by Gibb himself and Arnold. The song also features Arnold's falsetto in response to Barry's line 'I was born to be free'.

Personnel

- Barry Gibb — lead and harmony vocals, guitar
- P.P. Arnold — harmony vocals
- Bill Shepherd — orchestral arrangement
- Uncredited — lead guitar, drums
