= Moonlight (Barry Gibb song) =

Song by Barry Gibb
- Released: Unreleased
- Recorded: 15 and 20 February 1970 at IBC Studios, London
- Genre: Easy listening
- Length: 3:29
- Songwriter(s): Barry Gibb
- Producer(s): Barry Gibb

"Moonlight"

Song by Jerry Vale

from the album I Don't Know How to Love Her
- Released: 1970; 21 October 2003 (2003 reissue)
- Genre: Traditional pop, jazz
- Length: 3:03
- Label: Columbia
- Songwriter(s): Barry Gibb

"Moonlight" is a song written and performed by Barry Gibb in 1970. It was still unreleased until this day. "Moonlight" was recorded in The Kid's No Good sessions, but this track was not included. On February 15 the day started to record this song with "I'll Kiss Your Memory", "The Victim" and "Summer Ends" and this song was finished on February 20.

On its intro, Barry does harmony and background vocals. On this song only credits Gibb on lead vocals and guitar with the orchestra arranged by Bill Shepherd.

== Personnel ==
- Barry Gibb — lead, harmony and background vocals, acoustic guitar, producer
- Bill Shepherd — orchestral arrangement
- Uncredited — guitar, bass, drums

== Jerry Vale version ==
The Jerry Vale version released on the 1970 LP I Don't Know How to Love Her on Columbia Records. It was later included on You Don't Have to Say You Love Me/I Don't Know How to Love Her released on October 21, 2003.
