= Matt Slack =

English actor

Matt Slack is an English actor, comedian and stage director. He is known for his extensive work in British pantomimes and for his role in the film Damsel (2024). He has appeared in various film and television roles, including Doctors, Casualty and Eastenders. He began his acting career performing at Pontins before winning the Stairway to the Stars UK talent show. He has performed frequently in pantomime, appearing annually since 2013 during the winter season at Birmingham Hippodrome. He has also performed in musical theatre, including Boogie Nights: The 70s Musical (2003), Blood Brothers (2021) and The Adams Family musical (2022). He starred as Pharaoh in Andrew Lloyd Webber's Joseph and the Amazing Technicolor Dreamcoat in 2025. He made his directorial debut at New Theatre, Cardiff in 2019.

== Career ==
=== Early career ===
Slack is from Torquay. He had no formal training as an actor. He began performing at Pontins as a Bluecoat in 1993. In 1995, he became entertainments manager and won the Pontins award for "Entertainer of the Year". In that year, he also won the Stairway to the Stars UK talent show. A year later, he began performing in cabaret and won "Best Comedy Act" and "Entertainer of the Year" in the South West Awards.

=== Theatre ===
==== Pantomime ====
Slack appeared in his first pantominime as court jester in Snow White at the Pavilion Theatre in Worthing. He performed in several shows in Blackpool and Torquay, where he led the cast for three years at the Babbacombe Theatre.

Slack's first appearance in pantomime at Birmingham Hippodrome was in December 2013, when he played Oddjob in Snow White and the Seven Dwarfs. The following year, in December 2014, he played Silly Billy in Jack and the Beanstalk at Birmingham Hippodrome with Jane McDonald and Duncan James. In December 2015, he returned to Birmingham Hippodrome as Wishee Washee in Aladdin alongside Julian Clary, Lee Mead and Marti Pellow. In December 2016, he performed as Idle Jack in Dick Whittington at Birmingham Hippodrome with John Barrowman, Steve McFadden and The Krankies. He appeared in the role of Buttons next to Suzanne Shaw and Beverley Knight in Cinderella at Birmingham Hippodrome in December 2017. Slack played Smee in Peter Pan at Birmingham Hippodrome in December 2018, with Darren Day, who replaced Jimmy Osmond, Meera Syal and Jaymi Hensley. In December 2019, he returned to the theatre as Muddles in Snow White and the Seven Dwarfs alongside Lesley Joseph and Joe McElderry. In December 2021, he performed in Goldilocks and the Three Bears next to Jason Donovan at Birmingham Hippodrome. Slack played the title role in Dick Whittington with Marti Pellow, Dr Ranj and Suzanne Shaw at Birmingham Hippodrome in December 2022. In December 2023, Slack appeared as Jake in Jack And The Beanstalk with Alison Hammond and Samantha Womack. His eleventh pantomime, which he co-wrote, was Mr. Smee in Peter Pan at Birmingham Hippodrome in December 2024, alongside Danny Mac and Alison Hammond. In his twelfth consecutive pantomime at Birmingham Hippodrome, Slack played the title role in Robin Hood in December 2025, with Gok Wan, Christopher Biggins, Faye Tozer and Matt Cardle. In December 2026, Slack will play Lester the Jester in Sleeping Beauty opposite Rylan and Zoe Birkett.

==== Musical theatre ====
In 2003, he performed in the UK tour of Boogie Nights: The 70s Musical. He played the understudy for the lead role Roddy, before taking the lead role.

Slack appeared with Lesley Joseph in the comedy musical Hot Flush! at New Wimbledon Theatre in March 2014.

Slack was cast as a policeman/teacher in the UK tour of Blood Brothers in 2021. Later that year, he took the role of Wiggie in Fisherman's Friends: The Musical.

In 2022, Slack appeared in the role of Uncle Fester in the UK tour of The Addams Family musical.

Slack appeared in the role of Pharaoh in Joseph and the Amazing Technicolor Dreamcoat at Birmingham Hippodrome in May 2025.

=== Television ===
In 2017, Slack appeared in an episode of the British television series Doctors. He has also made guest leads in Casualty and Eastenders. He has also made appearances in Bergerac, FBI: International, The Musketeers and Law and Order UK.

=== Film ===
Slack played the part of sailor in The Raven (2012). He appeared in The Fall of the Krays (2016). He was cast as a king in the Netflix fantasy film Damsel (2024).

=== Directing ===
He made his directorial debut on 25 November 2019 for the Cinderella pantomime at New Theatre in Cardiff. He returned to the same theatre in 2021 to direct Aladdin. In 2022, he directed Goldilocks and the Three Bears at Richmond Theatre.

== Awards ==
In 2017, Slack won "Best Comic" at The Great British Pantomime Awards. He won The Great British Pantomime Awards in 2018 in the category of "Best Song Sheet" for Cinderella at Birmingham Hippodrome. For his service to the theatre, Slack was honoured with a dedicated seat plaque in row L of the stalls at Birmingham Hippodrome in 2019. Slack was nominated for "Best Comic" in the 2023 UK Pantomime Awards for his role in Dick Whittington at Birmingham Hippodrome. He was the winner of "Best Comic" in the UK Pantomime Awards 2024 for his performance in Jack and the Beanstalk at Birmingham Hippodrome.

== Personal life ==
Slack lives in London but considers Birmingham to be his second home.

In December 2015, Slack received medical treatment after losing his voice due to an infection. The damage to his vocal chords resulted in six months of recovery. He later commented, "I thought that might be it, the end. But Birmingham saw me through it, it really wouldn’t have been the same anywhere else".

While performing in Goldilocks and the Three Bears at Birmingham Hippodrome in December 2021, he tested positive for COVID-19 and was replaced at short notice by comedian and actor Johnny Mac.
