= Treat Her Like a Lady =

Treat Her Like a Lady may refer to:

- "Treat Her Like a Lady" (Cornelius Brothers & Sister Rose song), a 1971 song by Cornelius Brothers & Sister Rose
- "Treat Her Like a Lady", a 1979 song by Jimmy Buffett and David Loggins from Buffet's album Volcano
- "Treat Her Like a Lady" (The Temptations song), a 1984 song by The Temptations from their album Truly for You
- "Treat Her Like a Lady" (Diana King song)", a 1995 song by Diana King
  - Covered in 1997 by Celine Dion on Let's Talk About Love
- "Treat Her Like a Lady" (Joe song)", a 2000 single by Joe on his album My Name Is Joe
- "Treat Her Like a Lady", a theatrical production with CeCe Peniston
- "Treat Her Like a Lady", a 1967 song by the band Tages (band)

== See also ==
- Like a Lady (disambiguation)
- Treat Me Like a Lady (disambiguation)
