= Zoe Birkett =

English singer (born 1985)

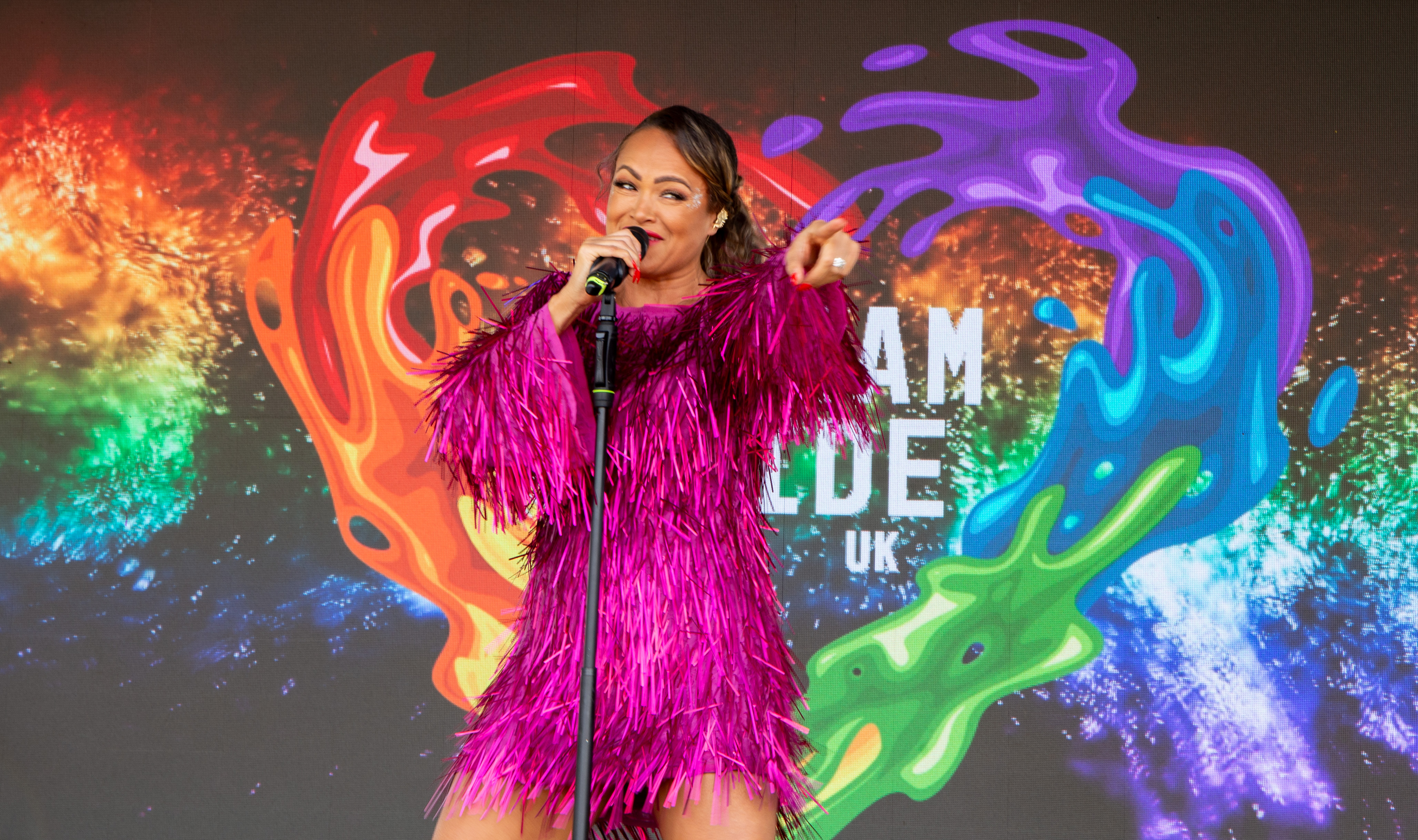

Background information
- Born: 16 June 1985 (age 41); Consett, County Durham, England
- Genre: Pop
- Occupations: Singer; actress; television personality
- Instrument: Vocals
- Years active: 2001-present
- Label: 19 Recordings

Zoe Birkett (born 16 June 1985) is an English singer, actress and television personality. She is best known for her appearances on series 1 of Pop Idol and series fifteen of Big Brother UK. Her first single, Treat Me Like A Lady, was released in 2003, charting in the UK Top 40.

== Early life ==
Birkett was born in Consett, County Durham and began attending stage school from the age of three. She trained at the Amanda McGlynn Academy in Middlesbrough, and at the Lorraine Murray Dance School.

== Music career ==
=== Pop Idol (2001–2002) ===
In 2001, Birkett participated on the first series of Pop Idol, where she ultimately placed fourth overall. She was the highest placing female in the competition. Artists Birkett covered during her time on the show included; ABBA, Aretha Franklin, Judy Garland and Whitney Houston. In 2002, she was the warm-up act for Pop Idol winners, Will Young and Gareth Gates' tour where she performed live to over 250,000 people. She also recorded three songs for the triple platinum album; Pop Idol: The Big Band Album, which charted at number 1 in the UK Albums Chart.

=== Solo career (2003) ===
In 2003, Birkett signed a recording contract with 19 Recordings and released one single titled; Treat Me Like A Lady, in January 2003. The track was co-written by fellow Pop Idol contestant Sarah Whatmore and peaked at number 12 in the UK Top 40 Singles Chart. Birkett later departed from the record label that same year, and began pursuing a career in musical theatre.

In 2011, she was a contestant on the short lived series Sing If You Can.

In 2026, she joined Take That on their stadium tour The Circus Live - Summer 2026, performing guest vocals on Relight My Fire.

== Theatre career ==
Birkett's first roles were in pantomimes and touring productions such as; Cover Girls, In Town Tonight, West End Rocks and What A Feeling. Since 2009, she has performed in multiple notable productions in the West End Theatre.

She was initially cast in Priscilla Queen of the Desert until 2011, before performing as the lead singer in Garrick Theatre's 2011 production of Respect La Diva. In 2012, she became the leading lady of Thriller Live. She was also cast as an understudy for The Bodyguard's leading lady, Alexandra Burke.

In 2021, she performed as Arabia in Moulin Rouge! The Musical at Piccadilly Theatre. She later performed as the leading lady in Satine. For the 2022/23 pantomime season Zoe performed as 'The Spirit of the Ring' in Aladdin at the Wolverhampton Grand Theatre, their second in-house production. She was featured in the Dave Malloy musical The Witches in 2023.

In 2024, it was announced that Birkett was sharing the role of Tina Turner, alongside actress Karis Anderson, in the West End production of; Tina - The Tina Turner Musical at the Aldwych Theatre. She received a WhatsOnStage Award nomination for Best Takeover for her performance in the musical.

In May 2026, it was announced that Zoe had been cast to play 'Carabosse' in Sleeping Beauty at the Birmingham Hippodrome for the 2026/27 season, alongside Rylan, Matt Slack and Andrew Ryan.

== Big Brother UK ==
In 2014, Birkett entered the fifteenth series of Big Brother UK, as a late entrant arriving on Day 40. Upon their arrival, the new housemates were unaware the public were voting to decide who to evict from the Big Brother house. Birkett was saved by the public receiving the highest number of votes - however, she was later evicted on Day 58, placing ninth overall.

== Acting career ==
In May 2026, Birkett appeared in Smoggie Queens, in Season 2 Episode 5, "A Smoggie Pageant", playing the role of "The Organiser" of the annual Mr Teesside Beauty Pageant.

== Personal life ==
In 2025, Birkett revealed she suffered a miscarriage while performing her role in Tina - The Tina Turner Musical.

== Filmography ==
Film and television
Year	Title	Role	Notes
2001	Pop Idol series 1	Self; contestant	4th place, 11 episodes
2001	Pop Idol Extra	Self; contestant	1 episode
2002	GMTV	Self; guest	1 episode
2002	The Saturday Show	Self; guest	2 episodes
2003	Smile	Self; guest	1 episode
2004	I Dream	Journalist	1 episode
2011	Sing If You Can	Self; contestant	1 episode
2014	Big Brother UK series 15	Self; housemate	9th place, 21 episodes
2014	Big Brother's Bit on the Side	Self; ex-housemate	7 episodes
2014	Big Brother's Bit on the Psych	Self; ex-housemate	1 episode
2018	Jane and Friends	Self; performer	1 episode
2018	Myth	Zoe	
2020	The Fosse Forest Ballet	Steph	
2021	At Home with Hayley	Self; guest	1 episode
2024	Loose Women	Self; guest	1 episode
2026	Smoggie Queens	The Organiser	1 episode
