= Like a Lady =

Like a Lady may refer to:

- "Like a Lady" (Monrose song)
- "Like a Lady" (Lady A song)

== See also ==
- Treat Her Like a Lady (disambiguation)
- Treat Me Like a Lady (disambiguation)
- Lady Like
