= The First Lady of Immediate =

Studio album by P. P. Arnold
- Released: 1968
- Recorded: 1967–1968
- Genres: Soul; R&B
- Label: Immediate
- Producers: Steve Marriott; Ronnie Lane; Mike Hurst; Mick Jagger

P. P. Arnold chronology
The First Lady of Immediate (1968)	Kafunta (1968)

The First Lady of Immediate is the debut album by American soul singer P. P. Arnold, released in 1968 on the Immediate Records label.

== History ==
By the time the album was released, P. P. Arnold, then known as Pat Arnold, left the Ikettes after beginning a friendship with Mick Jagger of the Rolling Stones, and signed to Immediate Records, a record label owned by the Rolling Stones' manager Andrew Oldham. She re-recorded a version of a song written by Cat Stevens, "The First Cut Is the Deepest". It peaked at No. 18 on the UK chart. "The Time Has Come" peaked at No. 47 on the UK chart, while "(If You Think You're) Groovy" peaked at No. 41.

== Reception ==
Professional ratings
Review scores
Source	Rating
AllMusic	4/5 stars
The Encyclopedia of Popular Music	3/5 stars

Dave Thompson of AllMusic stated "Despite such jumbled origins, the album holds together well. "Groovy," in particular, is a no-nonsense R&B pressure cooker, leaving one to wonder why the Small Faces (who provide instrumental duties on the track) never got around to releasing a version of their own. Spector/Mann/Weill's "Born to Be Together," meanwhile, is an absolute Oldham classic, bedecking Arnold's soulful voice with a full-blooded production that leaves the original sounding like a jellyfish."

== Track listing ==
Side one
No.	Title	Length
1.	"(If You Think You're) Groovy"
2.	"Something Beautiful Happened"
3.	"Born to Be Together"
4.	"Am I Still Dreaming"
5.	"Though It Hurts Me Badly"
6.	"The First Cut Is the Deepest"

Side two
No.	Title	Length
1.	"Everything Is Gonna Be Alright"
2.	"Treat Me Like a Lady"
3.	"Would You Believe"
4.	"Life Is But Nothing"
5.	"Speak to Me"
6.	"The Time Has Come"

== Credits ==
- Cover, Design – Derek Burton
- Photography By – Gered Mankowitz

== Charts ==
Title	Year	Peak chart positions
Title	Year	UK
"The First Cut Is the Deepest"	1967	18
"The Time Has Come"	1967	47
"(If You Think You're) Groovy"	1968	41
