= The First Cut Is the Deepest =

1965 song written by Cat Stevens

"First Cut Is the Deepest"

Single by P. P. Arnold

from the album The First Lady of Immediate
- Released: 21 April 1967
- Genre: Pop; soul
- Length: 3:07
- Label: Immediate
- Songwriter: Cat Stevens
- Producer: Mike Hurst

P. P. Arnold singles chronology
"The Time Has Come" (1967)	"First Cut Is the Deepest" (1967)	"(If You Think You're) Groovy" (1967)

"The First Cut Is the Deepest"

Single by Cat Stevens

from the album New Masters
- B-side: "Where Are You"
- Released: 18 May 1972
- Recorded: 5 October 1967
- Studio: Decca, West Hampstead, London
- Genre: Rock
- Length: 3:03
- Label: Deram, Decca
- Songwriter: Cat Stevens
- Producer: Mike Hurst

Cat Stevens singles chronology
"Morning Has Broken" (1972)	"The First Cut Is the Deepest" (1972)	"Sitting" (1972)

"The First Cut Is the Deepest" is a 1967 song written by British singer-songwriter Cat Stevens, originally released by P. P. Arnold for her album The First Lady of Immediate in April 1967. Stevens' own version originally appeared on his album New Masters in December 1967.

The song has been widely recorded and has become a hit single for six different artists: Arnold, Stevens, Keith Hampshire (1973), Rod Stewart (1977), Papa Dee (1995), and Sheryl Crow (2003). In 1968, the Koobas, a Liverpool band, cut a version of the song but were overshadowed by P.P. Arnold's version, which hit the UK Singles chart Top 20.

== Background ==
The lyrics of "The First Cut is the Deepest" describe a person wondering if and how it is possible to love again after their first love was lost. "The first cut" of the title refers to one's first love disappointment.

== Cat Stevens version ==
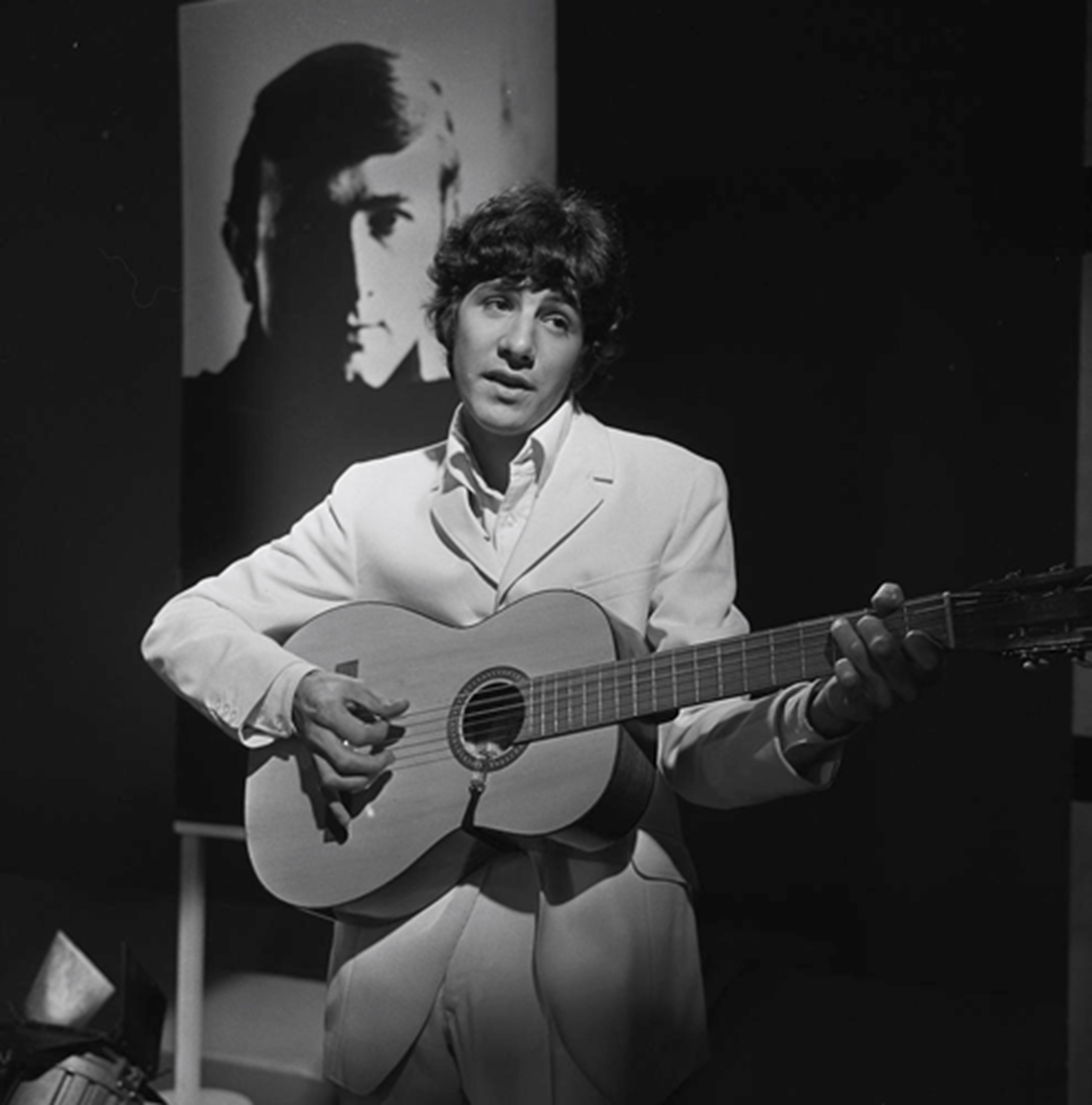
Cat Stevens performing on Dutch TV in 1966

Cat Stevens made a demo recording of "The First Cut Is the Deepest" in 1965, while hoping to become a songwriter. He wrote the song to promote his songs to other artists, but did not record his own performance until early October 1967 with guitarist Big Jim Sullivan, and it did not appear until his second album, New Masters, was released on 15 December 1967. The year he wrote the song, he sold it for £30 (equivalent to £510 in 2025) to P. P. Arnold, who recorded it a year later for her album The First Lady of Immediate, becoming a huge hit for her in early 1967. Over decades, it also became an international hit for Keith Hampshire, Rod Stewart, and Sheryl Crow. The song has won Stevens songwriting awards, including two consecutive ASCAP songwriting awards for Songwriter of the Year in 2005 and 2006. Stevens's version was not released as a single until 1972 when it was released as an Australia-only single in promotion of Stevens' 1970 compilation album The World of Cat Stevens.

=== Personnel ===
- Cat Stevens – lead and backing vocals, acoustic guitar, piano
- Big Jim Sullivan – electric guitar
- Herbie Flowers – bass guitar
- Chris Hunt – drums

=== Certifications ===
Region	Certification	Certified units/sales
New Zealand (RMNZ)	Gold	15,000^{‡}
^{‡} Sales+streaming figures based on certification alone.

== P. P. Arnold version ==
American expatriate singer P. P. Arnold had the first hit with the song, reaching No. 18 on the UK Singles Chart with her version in May 1967, well ahead of it appearing on Stevens' album New Masters. The Arnold hit, included on her album The First Lady of Immediate, featured an up-tempo, soulful vocal set against harpsichord, horns, and strings. It also appeared in the 2012 feature film Seven Psychopaths.

Record World said that "this gal shouts it out and then caresses it on a big beat rocker."

== Keith Hampshire version ==
"The First Cut Is the Deepest"

Single by Keith Hampshire

from the album The First Cut
- B-side: "Sitting in the Park" (US) "Waking Up Alone" (UK) "You Can't Hear the Song I Sing" (Japan)
- Released: April 1973
- Genre: Pop
- Label: A&M
- Songwriter: Cat Stevens
- Producers: Bill Misener; Gerry Lacoursiere

Keith Hampshire singles chronology
"Daytime Night-time" (1972)	"The First Cut Is the Deepest" (1973)	"Big Time Operator" (1973)

Keith Hampshire had the first chart-topping hit of the song when his recording of it from his album The First Cut became a number-one hit in Canada in 1973, reaching the top of the RPM 100 national singles chart on 12 May of that year. It also topped the Canadian Adult Contemporary chart and charted in the United States, albeit outside the top 40.

=== Charts ===
==== Weekly charts ====
Chart (1973)	Peak position
Australia (Kent Music Report)	33
Canada Top Singles (RPM)	1
Canada Adult Contemporary (RPM)	1
US Billboard Hot 100	70

==== Year-end charts ====
Chart (1973)	Position
Canada Top Singles (RPM)	21

=== Release history ===
Region	Date	Format(s)	Label(s)	Ref.
United States	April 1973	Vinyl	A&M	
Canada	May 1973	Vinyl	A&M	
United Kingdom	18 May 1973	Vinyl	A&M	
Japan	June 1973	Vinyl	A&M	

== Rod Stewart version ==
"The First Cut Is the Deepest"

Single by Rod Stewart

from the album A Night on the Town
- A-side: "I Don't Want to Talk About It"
- Released: February 1977
- Studio: Muscle Shoals Sound Studio, Sheffield, Alabama, United States
- Length: 4:38 (album version); 3:21 (single version)
- Label: Riva
- Songwriter: Cat Stevens
- Producer: Tom Dowd

Rod Stewart singles chronology
"I Don't Want to Talk About It" (1976)	"The First Cut Is the Deepest" (1977)	"You're in My Heart (The Final Acclaim)" (1977)

Music video
- "The First Cut Is the Deepest" on YouTube

Stewart recorded the song at Muscle Shoals Sound Studio in Sheffield, Alabama, United States, and it appeared on his 1976 album A Night on the Town. Originally released as a single in the US and in some European territories, it was released as a double A-side single with "I Don't Want to Talk About It" in the UK in April. It was a huge success, and spent four weeks at No. 1 on the UK Singles Chart in May 1977, No. 11 in April in Canada, and also reached No. 21 on the Billboard Hot 100 in the U.S. In a departure from the original, Stewart excludes the concluding "But when it comes to being loved, she's first" from the refrain. In 1993, he recorded a live version during a session of MTV Unplugged. This was included on the 1993 live album Unplugged...and Seated.

Record World called it a "love ballad, this time penned by Cat Stevens back in the sixties. Watch for another rapid chart ascent."

=== Charts ===
==== Weekly charts ====
Chart (1977)	Peak position
Australia (Kent Music Report)	19
Canada Top Singles (RPM)	11
New Zealand (Recorded Music NZ)	21
UK Singles (Official Charts)	1
US Billboard Hot 100	21
US Adult Contemporary (Billboard)	43
US Cash Box Top 100	17
Zimbabwe (ZIMA)	8

==== Year-end charts ====
Chart (1977)	Rank
Australia	70
Canada	110
US (Joel Whitburn's Pop Annual)	136

=== Certifications ===
Certifications for "The First Cut Is the Deepest" Rod Stewart version
Region	Certification	Certified units/sales
New Zealand (RMNZ)	Gold	15,000^{‡}
^{‡} Sales+streaming figures based on certification alone.

=== Release history ===
Region	Date	Format(s)	Label(s)
United States	February 1977	Vinyl	Warner Bros.
United Kingdom	15 April 1977	Vinyl	Warner Bros.

== Papa Dee version ==
"The First Cut Is the Deepest"

Single by Papa Dee

from the album The Journey
- B-side: "Papa Do It Sweet"
- Released: June 1995
- Genre: Reggae
- Length: 3:48
- Label: Warner
- Songwriter: Cat Stevens
- Producers: Denniz Pop; Max Martin; Kristian Lundin; John Amatiello

Papa Dee singles chronology
"Jungle Sound Clash" (1994)	"The First Cut Is the Deepest" (1995)	"The Journey" (1996)

Music video
- "The First Cut Is the Deepest on YouTube

Swedish musician Papa Dee released a reggae cover of "The First Cut Is the Deepest" in 1995. It was produced by Denniz Pop, Max Martin, Kristian Lundin and John Amatiello, and released by Warner as the first single from his fourth album, The Journey (1996). It remains his most commercially successful track and scored chart success in Europe. The song peaked at No. 5 in Sweden, No. 9 in Denmark and Norway, No. 20 in Austria, and No. 38 in Iceland.

=== Critical reception ===
Pan-European magazine Music & Media wrote, "Dee-lightfully our Swedish Papa tackles the old Cat Stevens hit in a pop dance-infused reggae style with a snappy ragga interlude. Radio, club and dub edits are available too."

=== Track listings ===
12-inch single, Europe (1995)
No.	Title	Length
1.	"The First Cut Is the Deepest" (club remix)	6:08
2.	"The First Cut Is the Deepest" (single edit)	3:48
3.	"The First Cut Is the Deepest" (12-inch dub cut)	5:46
4.	"The First Cut Is the Deepest" (dub version)	5:36

CD single, Australia (1995)
No.	Title	Length
1.	"The First Cut Is the Deepest" (single edit)	3:48
2.	"The First Cut Is the Deepest" (club edit)	6:08
3.	"The First Cut Is the Deepest" (dub version)	5:36
4.	"Papa Do It Sweet"	4:12

CD maxi, Sweden (1995)
No.	Title	Length
1.	"The First Cut Is the Deepest" (single edit)	3:48
2.	"The First Cut Is the Deepest" (club edit)	6:08
3.	"The First Cut Is the Deepest" (dub version)	5:36
4.	"Papa Do It Sweet"	4:12

=== Charts ===
==== Weekly charts ====
Chart (1995)	Peak position
Austria (Ö3 Austria Top 40)	20
Denmark (IFPI)	9
Europe (Eurochart Hot 100)	66
Iceland (Íslenski Listinn Topp 40)	38
Norway (VG-lista)	9
Sweden (Sverigetopplistan)	5

==== Year-end charts ====
Chart (1995)	Position
Latvia (Latvijas Top 50)	64
Sweden (Topplistan)	41

== Sheryl Crow version ==
"The First Cut Is the Deepest"

Single by Sheryl Crow

from the album The Very Best of Sheryl Crow
- B-side: "My Favorite Mistake" (live)
- Released: 22 September 2003
- Length: 3:44
- Label: A&M
- Songwriter: Cat Stevens
- Producer: John Shanks

Sheryl Crow singles chronology
"It's So Easy" (2002)	"The First Cut Is the Deepest" (2003)	"Light in Your Eyes" (2004)

Music video
- "The First Cut Is the Deepest on YouTube

Sheryl Crow's version of "The First Cut Is the Deepest", inspired by Rod Stewart's version, is the first single released from her 2003 compilation album The Very Best of Sheryl Crow. It became one of Crow's biggest radio hits, peaking at No. 14 on the US Billboard Hot 100 and becoming her first solo top-40 country hit following the success of her duet with Kid Rock, "Picture". The song stayed on the Hot 100 for 36 weeks and became a gold seller, also reaching No. 1 on the Billboard Adult Contemporary, Adult Top 40, and Triple-A charts. Internationally, it was a top-20 success in Hungary, Ireland and New Zealand.

=== Music video ===
The Sheryl Crow music video for "The First Cut Is the Deepest" was directed by Wayne Isham. Filmed in southern Utah, the video features Sheryl in a rocky desert singing with her guitar, riding horses and interacting in a cowboy environment. Sheryl's single was nominated for a Best Female Pop Vocal Performance at the 47th Annual Grammy Awards, losing to "Sunrise" by Norah Jones.

=== Charts ===
==== Weekly charts ====
Chart (2003–2004)	Peak position
Australia (ARIA)	50
Austria (Ö3 Austria Top 40)	31
Germany (GfK)	61
Hungary (Rádiós Top 40)	20
Ireland (IRMA)	13
Netherlands (Single Top 100)	79
New Zealand (Recorded Music NZ)	19
Quebec (ADISQ)	2
Scottish Singles Sales (Official Charts)	22
Switzerland (Schweizer Hitparade)	45
UK Singles (Official Charts)	37
US Billboard Hot 100	14
US Adult Alternative Airplay (Billboard)	1
US Adult Contemporary (Billboard)	1
US Adult Pop Airplay (Billboard)	1
US Hot Country Songs (Billboard)	35
US Pop Airplay (Billboard)	10

==== Year-end charts ====
Chart (2003)	Position
US Adult Top 40 (Billboard)	47

Chart (2004)	Position
Hungary (Rádiós Top 40)	92
US Billboard Hot 100	28
US Adult Contemporary (Billboard)	2
US Adult Top 40 (Billboard)	10
US Mainstream Top 40 (Billboard)	37
US Triple-A (Billboard)	24

=== Certifications ===
Region	Certification	Certified units/sales
Australia (ARIA)	Gold	35,000^{‡}
United States (RIAA)	Gold	500,000^{‡}
^{‡} Sales+streaming figures based on certification alone.

=== Release history ===
Region	Date	Format(s)	Label(s)	Ref.
United States	22 September 2003	Hot adult contemporary; triple A radio	A&M	
United Kingdom	20 October 2003	CD	A&M	
Australia	27 October 2003	CD	A&M	
United States	27 October 2003	Country radio	A&M	
United States	17 November 2003	Contemporary hit radio	A&M	

== See also ==
- List of Billboard Adult Contemporary number ones of 2004
