= Treat Me Like a Lady (Zoe Birkett song) =

2003 single by Zoe Birkett

Single by Zoe Birkett
- B-side: "I Say a Little Prayer"
- Released: 13 January 2003
- Length: 3:43
- Label: 19
- Producer(s): Ray Hedges

Treat Me Like a Lady is a song produced by Ray Hedges and released as a single by Pop Idol contestant Zoe Birkett in 2003. The single peaked at number 12 on the UK Singles Chart and number 43 in Ireland.

== Charts ==
Chart (2003)	Peak position
Europe (Eurochart Hot 100)	43
Ireland (IRMA)	43
Scotland (OCC)	12
UK Singles (OCC)	12
