= I'll Kiss Your Memory =

Single by Barry Gibb
- B-side: "This Time"
- Released: May 1970 (Europe)
- Recorded: 15, 20 February 1970; IBC Studios, London
- Length: 4:26
- Label: Polydor
- Songwriter(s): Barry Gibb
- Producer(s): Barry Gibb

Barry Gibb singles chronology
"I'll Kiss Your Memory" (1970)	"The Day Your Eyes Meet Mine" (1970)

"I'll Kiss Your Memory" is the first solo single written, performed and produced by Barry Gibb, released in May 1970. It peaked at number 16 in the Netherlands. The song was intended for Gibb's unreleased debut album The Kid's No Good.

== Background ==
=== Recording ===
The song features an echo vocal with an arrangement of orchestra by Bill Shepherd. This song was recorded in IBC Studios on 15 February and finished on 20 February with "The Victim", "Moonlight" and "Summer Ends". "It's not the same orchestra as we used with the Bee Gees", Gibb explained, "But Bill Shepherd is the only arranger I'll ever work with. On the single ['I'll Kiss Your Memory'] I double-tracked my voice seven times, because I knew exactly how I wanted everything done."

=== Release ===
The single was released in the U.K. and the U.S., but did not chart. The CD version of the song was available in the compilation Tales from the Brothers Gibb. This track's stereo mix was released in 1974 on I've Gotta Get a Message to You (1974).

== Personnel ==
- Barry Gibb – lead and harmony vocals, rhythm guitar
- Bill Shepherd – orchestra and strings arrangement

== Chart performance ==
Chart (1970)	Peak position
Netherlands Dutch Top 40	16
