= The King of Elfland's Daughter (album) =

Studio album by Bob Johnson and Peter Knight
- Released: 1977
- Recorded: 1977
- Studio: Wessex Sound Studios, London
- Genre: Progressive rock, British folk rock
- Length: 35:34
- Label: Chrysalis
- Producer: Bob Johnson, Peter Knight

Professional ratings
Review scores
Source	Rating
Allmusic	2.5/5 stars

The King of Elfland's Daughter is a 1977 concept album by former Steeleye Span members Bob Johnson and Peter Knight. It was based on the 1924 fantasy novel of the same name by Lord Dunsany. The cover illustration is by Jimmy Cauty.

== Track listing ==
Side 1

1. "The Request" (3.23) vocals - Chris Farlowe
2. "Lirazel" (4.11) vocals - Mary Hopkin
3. "Witch" (3.35) vocals - P.P. Arnold
4. "Alveric's Journey Through Elfland" (4.57) vocals - Frankie Miller

Side 2

1. "The Rune of the Elf King" (3.59) vocals - Christopher Lee
2. "The Coming of the Troll" (1.53) vocals - Alexis Korner
3. "Just Another Day of Searching" (5.09) vocals - Frankie Miller
4. "Too Much Magic" (3.58) vocals - Derek Brimstone
5. "Beyond the Fields We Know" (4.29) vocals - Mary Hopkin

== Personnel ==
=== Musicians ===
- Bob Johnson: acoustic and electric guitars; bass guitar (#1, 3)
- Peter Knight: autoharp, synthesiser, electric piano, glockenspiel, piano, violins, mandolins
- Herbie Flowers: bass guitar (#2–9)
- Nigel Pegrum: drums, percussion (#1–6)
- Ray Cooper: percussion (#2, 4)
- Chris Spedding: acoustic guitars (#9)
- Kenny Clarc: drums (#7, 9)
- Tony Newman: drums (#8)
- Mike Bait: clarinet (#6)
- The Maggins String Quartet: strings quartet (#7)

=== Cast ===
Aside from the musicians on the album, also featured was a cast of actors and musicians who played the parts of the characters in the book:

- The King of Elfland and the narrator: Christopher Lee
- Lirazel: Mary Hopkin
- Alveric: Frankie Miller
- The Troll: Alexis Korner
- The Witch: P.P. Arnold
- A villager of Erl: Chris Farlowe
- A Villager of Erl: Derek Brimstone
- Children of Erl: Gayhurst Junior School Choir
- The English Chorale : Choir
- Barry St. John
- Liza Strike
- Vicki Brown
- Bob Johnson
- Lavinia Rodgers
- Denise Garcia
- Eleanor Keenan

The cast provided all the vocals for the album. Bob Johnson is one of four backing vocalists on "Alveric's Journey Through Elfland". Peter Knight did not contribute any vocals.

Orchestrated and conducted by Peter Knight, except for "The Rune of the Elf King" which was orchestrated by Paul Lewis.
