= The Kid's No Good =

- Unofficial artwork created by Jon Hunt

Studio album by Barry Gibb
- Released: Unreleased
- Recorded: 15 February – 23 March 1970
- Studios: IBC Studios, London
- Genres: Country; folk; blues; rock; baroque pop
- Language: English
- Producer: Barry Gibb

Bootleg covers
- Ladybird bootleg version

The Kid's No Good was to have been the debut solo album by British musician Barry Gibb following his departure from the Bee Gees in December 1969. There was no official title given to the album at the time. The line "the kid's no good", which the album is commonly titled on several bootleg releases, is also featured in the Bee Gees song "Come Home Johnny Bridie" on the 1973 album Life in a Tin Can. The album features orchestral arrangements by Bill Shepherd who performed the same role for the Bee Gees from 1965 to 1972 (Robin and Maurice Gibb's solo recordings were done with different arrangers).

== Background ==
On 1 December 1969, Barry Gibb announced his departure from the Bee Gees and that he would carry on as a solo artist instead. He would spend the following months writing new material for his solo album; however, few of the songs were released. "It's not the same orchestra as we used with the Bee Gees", Gibb explained, "But Bill Shepherd is the only arranger I'll ever work with."

== Recording ==
I love country music and I probably allowed a little more than I should have to influence me. But I do music that I enjoy and hope that everyone else will enjoy it too. If you try to work for whatever everyone else wants, I think that you get lost."

— Gibb discussing his songs on The Kid's No Good

Gibb began recording the album on 15 February 1970 with four songs: "I'll Kiss Your Memory", "The Victim", "Moonlight" and "Summer Ends". The latter two were held off the album and instead offered to other artists for later release. On 20 February, Gibb recorded "It's Over", also known as "I Just Want to Take Care of You". On 22 February he recorded "A Child, a Girl, a Woman", "Mando Bay", "Born", "Clyde O'Reilly" and "Peace in My Mind". On 9 March he recorded "What's It All About", "This Time" and "The Day Your Eyes Meet Mine" and on 23 March he recorded the last two songs, the upbeat pop number "One Bad Thing" and the soft ballad "Happiness". Other musicians are uncredited but P. P. Arnold, with whom Gibb was working with at the time, can be heard singing backing vocals on some songs.

== Reception ==
"I'll Kiss Your Memory" and its B-side "This Time" from these sessions were released as a single (Polydor in much of the world, Atco in North America) but did not chart. The songs "One Bad Thing" and "The Day Your Eyes Meet Mine" were proposed to be released as a single around October 1970. Both songs had originally been written by Barry and Maurice Gibb and recorded during the Cucumber Castle sessions but were left unused; the versions for his solo album were, however, new recordings. Atco's initial batch of the follow-up single, featuring a sole songwriting credit for Gibb for both songs, were destroyed although a few copies have survived and are considered collector's items today. At the last minute it was decided to focus on a new Bee Gees release instead.

AllMusic's Bruce Eder described "Mando Bay" as 'moody' and "One Bad Thing" as 'Beatlesque', adding: "Sounds here are of a piece with the Bee Gees' late sixties output, and they're worth owning by any admirers of the trio who are interested in stretching their legacy as far as possible."

== Track listing ==
All tracks are written by Barry Gibb, except where noted.

Side one
No.	Title	Length
1.	"Born"	3:54
2.	"One Bad Thing" (Barry Gibb, Maurice Gibb)	3:32
3.	"The Day Your Eyes Meet Mine" (Barry Gibb, Maurice Gibb)	3:07
4.	"Happiness"	3:28
5.	"Peace in My Mind"	4:10
6.	"Clyde O'Reilly"	5:23

Side two
No.	Title	Length
1.	"It's Over"	3:57
2.	"I'll Kiss Your Memory"	4:26
3.	"The Victim"	3:59
4.	"This Time"	3:24
5.	"What's It All About"	3:09
6.	"Mando Bay"	4:48

This is most likely the intended line-up although available sources differ as to the placement of the first and last tracks. Various bootleg releases add a number of additional tracks recorded both during and long after the album's recording sessions.

== Personnel ==
- Barry Gibb – lead and backing vocal, guitar
- P. P. Arnold – backing vocal on "Born"
- Bill Shepherd – orchestral arrangement
- Mike Claydon – sound engineer
- Damon Lyon-Shaw – sound engineer
- Uncredited – bass, drums, piano, organ, harpsichord, Mellotron

== Cover versions ==
Although technically not considered cover versions, since most of the songs were not officially released, many of the songs were offered to and recorded by a number of different artists over the following years.

- Wildwood covered "One Bad Thing" released as a single in 1971.
- The Freshmen covered "One Bad Thing" released as a single in 1971.
- New Horizon covered "One Bad Thing" released as a single in 1971.
