= Peter Knight (folk musician) =

British folk musician (born 1947)

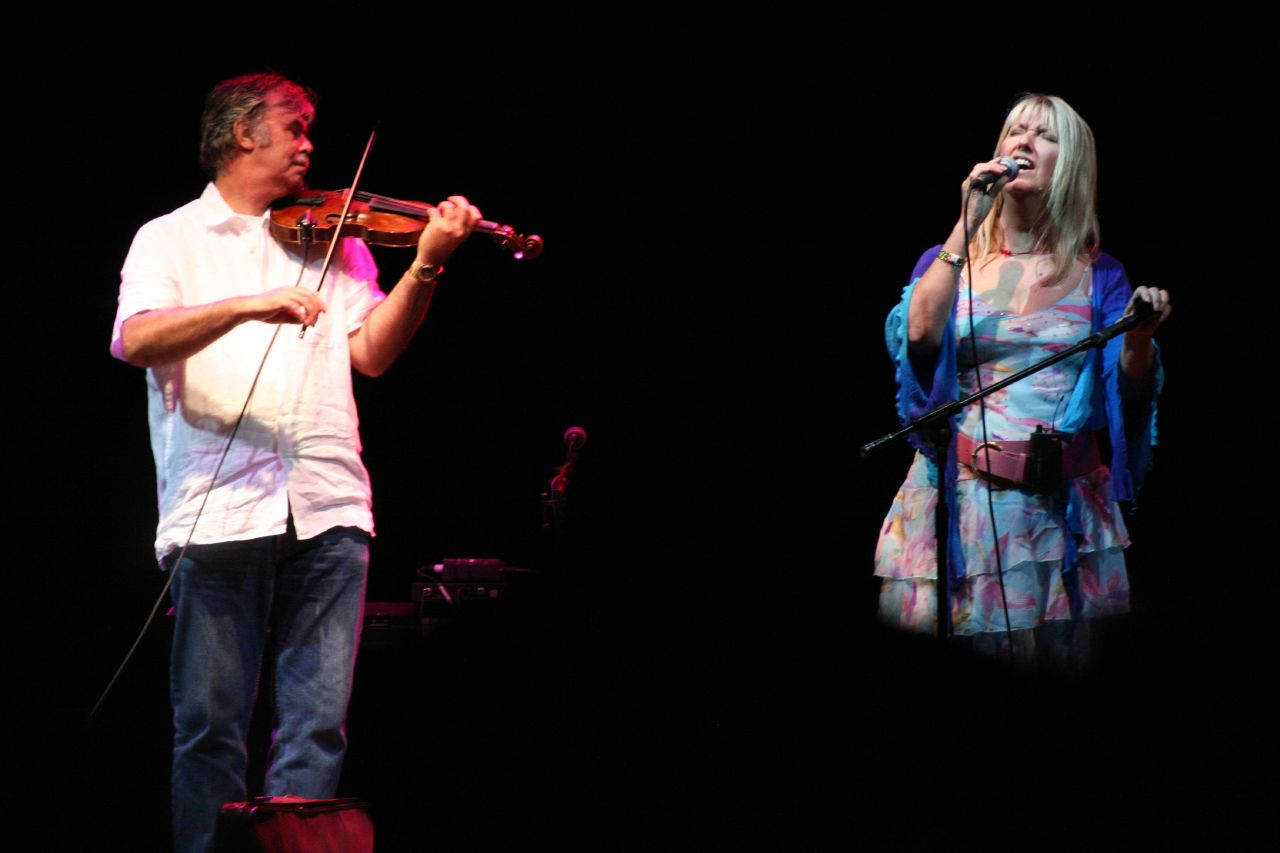
- Peter Knight and Maddy Prior at Fairport's Cropredy Convention 2006

Background information
- Born: 27 May 1947 (age 79); London, England, UK
- Genre: Folk
- Instruments: Violin; keyboards; guitar; mandolin; banjo; vocals; bass; recorder
- Years active: 1960s–present
- Formerly of: Steeleye Span
- Spouse: Deborah Knight (m. 2011)

Peter Knight (born 27 May 1947) is an English folk musician. He was a member of British folk rock group Steeleye Span from 1970 to 2013.

== Early life ==
Born in London, Knight learnt to play the violin and mandolin as a child before going to the Royal Academy of Music from 1960 to 1964, enrolling at thirteen and graduating at sixteen. The recordings of the Irish fiddlers Michael Coleman and Michael Gorman inspired him to take part in Irish pub sessions.

== Career ==
Knight teamed up with guitarist and singer Bob Johnson until 1970 when he joined Steeleye Span. The parting was short-lived, as Johnson himself also joined Steeleye Span in 1972. In 1971, he performed on Roy Bailey's debut album.

In the mid-70s he was once secretly a member of The Wombles and appeared on Top of The Pops as Uncle Bulgaria, with Rick Kemp and Bob Johnson also in Womble suits; when speaking about his experience as a Womble, Knight said: "It's a bit embarrassing... but all my Wombles are in America," was how Mike Batt had raised the issue. "He was producing one of Steeleye Span's albums, and he was looking for someone to be the Wombles on Top of the Pops. We (Knight, Kemp and Johnson) all jumped at the opportunity."

He left Steeleye Span in January 1977, when it started to look as if the band was about to break up. Knight teamed up with Johnson again to record a concept album The King of Elfland's Daughter (1978), based on the novel by Lord Dunsany. It included one song sung by blues legend Alexis Korner and another by Mary Hopkin. In 1980 he returned to Steeleye Span and appeared on every one of their albums since then up until Wintersmith (released October 2013). Also in the 1980s, he met saxophonist Trevor Watts and was introduced to free improvisation. He played with Watts in bands such as Moiré Music and The Drum Orchestra.

In 1995 he recorded an album with bass-player Danny Thompson, best known for his work with John Martyn. Knight formed Tanna with guitarist Kevin Dempsey and Tom Leary during the 2000s. He appeared as a guest on Mostly Autumn's 2007 album Heart Full of Sky and performed as a guest at their album launch show at the London Astoria on 10 February 2007. In 2012, he was appointed Patron of the Fiddle Festival of Britain.

Knight formed his own band, Gigspanner, a trio turned six-piece folk band he still tours with as of 2026. He announced his decision to leave Steeleye Span at the end of 2013 on his website on 14 November 2013. Knight's exact reasons for leaving Steeleye Span are still unclear, but when asked in a 2013 interview, lead singer Maddy Prior said: "I'm not quite sure, maybe it's time to have a break and do other things. Gigspanner is his baby and that's what he wants to do. It's a bit late on for returns but I would never say it's out of the question."

Since 2016, he has performed as a duo with Bellowhead founder and melodeon player, John Spiers. He appeared as a guest on The Lost Trades's 2021 album The Bird, The Book & The Barrel

== Personal life ==
Knight lives with his wife, Deborah Walker Knight, who he married in Kingsand in 2011.

== Discography (excluding Steeleye Span) ==
=== Solo ===
Year	Title
1991	An Ancient Cause
1998	The Gemini Cadenza
2005	Too Late For Shadows

=== Collaborative albums ===
Year	Title	Notes
1977	The King of Elfland's Daughter	Made with Bob Johnson
1995	Peter Knight and Danny Thompson	Made with Danny Thompson
2000	Ballads and Candles	Made with Maddy Prior
2002	Feast of Fiddles	Made with Chris Leslie, Tom Leary, Ian Cutler, Phil Beer, Hugh Crabtree and Brian McNeill
2004	Nicely Wrong	Made with Chris Leslie, Tom Leary, Ian Cutler, Phil Beer, Hugh Crabtree and Brian McNeill
2006	Still Live	Made with Chris Leslie, Tom Leary, Ian Cutler, Phil Beer, Hugh Crabtree and Brian McNeill
2018	Well Met	Made with John Spiers
2021	The Bird, The Book & The Barrel	Made with The Lost Trades
2021	Both in a Tune	Made with John Spiers

=== With Gigspanner ===
Year	Title	Notes
2009	Lipreading The Poet	
2010	Doors At Eight	Live from May 2010 tour
2015	Layers of Ages	
2017	The Wife Of Urban Law	
2017	Live	Released as Gigspanner "Big Band" / live at Fairport's Cropredy Convention, 9 August 2017
2020	Natural Invention	Released as Gigspanner "Big Band"
2021	From Poets To Wives	Compilation from the above 4 Gigspanner albums
2025	Turnstone	Released as Gigspanner "Big Band"
