= Bob Johnson (musician) =

British guitarist (1944–2023)

- Born: Robert Michael Leonard Johnson; 18 March 1944; Clapham, England, UK
- Died: 15 December 2023 (aged 79)
- Genre: Folk
- Instruments: Guitar; vocals
- Years active: 1960s–2000
- Formerly of: Steeleye Span

Robert Michael Leonard Johnson (18 March 1944 – 15 December 2023) was a British guitarist, singer and songwriter. He was a member of the British folk rock band Steeleye Span from 1972 to 1977, and again from 1980 to 2001.

== Early life ==
Robert Johnson was born in Clapham, South West London; his mother, Chella, was a music teacher and his father, Leonard, was a salesman who had been invalidated out of the army. He was educated at Westminster City School in London. He left school after taking his O-levels.

== Musical career ==
In the 1960s, Johnson played in pop and rock bands, and at one point backed Paul Raven, who later found fame as Gary Glitter, and P. J. Proby. In 1968, he met musician Peter Knight, who moved into the house share he was living in. They worked with each other as a duo while Johnson worked his dayjob as a cleaner, until 1970, when Knight joined Steeleye Span.

Johnson played acoustic and electric guitars and sang on Appalachian dulcimer player Roger Nicholson's 1972 album Nonesuch for Dulcimer, credited as Robert Johnson. He went on to become a member of the successful English electric folk band Steeleye Span in 1972, after being introduced by fiddler Peter Knight. At the time, he was working as a computer programmer and was reluctant to join at first, but was persuaded by his first wife, Jane. Johnson first appeared on the group's fourth album, Below the Salt, where he took lead vocals on the track "King Henry". Along with "King Henry", he introduced many of the band's better-known songs into the repertoire, such as "Thomas the Rhymer", "Alison Gross", "Long Lankin" and "Gaudete".

Despite taking lead vocals on many songs, including "King Henry", he was something of a background member. Johnson left Steeleye Span temporarily in 1977 to work on a concept album, The King of Elfland's Daughter, along with Peter Knight. However, he returned in 1980 to record Sails of Silver. Owing to health reasons, he left Steeleye Span in 2000. In 2023, Steeleye Span released a new recording of the track "The Green Man", which was written by Johnson in the 1980s but never officially released. The guitar riff was repurposed by Johnson for the song "Well Done, Liar" on the 2000 album, Bedlam Born.

== Personal life and death ==
Johnson was married twice, his first wife was Jane Loveless, who he was married to until 1996, and his second wife, Mandy Horlock, who he was married to from 2001 until his death. He had two children with Jane.

Johnson died on 15 December 2023, at the age of 79. On 16 December, the Steeleye Span Twitter account released a statement announcing his death, saying “he had been poorly for a few months now but finally left us in search of the rainbow’s end”.
