= A Collection: Greatest Hits...and More =

Greatest hits album by Barbra Streisand
- Released: October 3, 1989
- Recorded: June 1975 – 1989
- Length: 51:16
- Label: Columbia
- Producers: Charles Koppelman (executive); Barbra Streisand (executive); Peter Matz (executive); Narada Michael Walden; Barry Gibb; Albhy Galuten; Karl Richardson; Phil Ramone; Andrew Lloyd Webber; Bob Esty; Michael Masser; Jeffrey Lesser; Rupert Holmes; Dave Grusin; David Foster

Barbra Streisand chronology
| Till I Loved You (1988) | A Collection: Greatest Hits...and More (1989) | Just for the Record... (1991) |

Singles from A Collection: Greatest Hits...and More
- 1. "We're Not Makin' Love Anymore" Released: September 14, 1989; 2. "Someone That I Used to Love" Released: 1989

A Collection: Greatest Hits...and More is the fourth greatest hits album recorded by American vocalist Barbra Streisand. It was released on October 3, 1989, by Columbia Records. The compilation features ten songs from Streisand's career, dating from 1975 to 1988, plus two previously unreleased songs: "We're Not Makin' Love Anymore" was released as the album's lead single on September 14, 1989, and "Someone That I Used to Love" was distributed as the second and final one in 1989. Both singles charted on several record charts internationally.

The compilation was executively produced by Streisand, Charles Koppelman, and Peter Matz. A Collection: Greatest Hits...and More was criticized by critics for being yet another greatest hits album from Streisand. Commercially, it reached number 26 on the Billboard 200 in the United States and topped the charts in both Norway and Sweden. It would later be certified for significant sales in eight countries, including in the United States where 2,000,000 copies were shipped.

== Development and songs ==
In 1989, Barbra Streisand began devoting most of her time towards directing the 1991 film adaptation of Pat Conroy's 1986 novel The Prince of Tides. Due to her tight schedule and limited availability, Columbia Records approached Streisand on releasing another greatest hits album, since she had been in a similar situation during the distribution of her prior compilation release, Memories (1981). A Collection: Greatest Hits...and More was released as a compact disc (CD) in the United States on October 3, 1989, by Columbia Records. The compilation was executively produced by Streisand, Charles Koppelman, and Peter Matz. It was reissued in select European territories in 1997 by Columbia's worldwide label, CBS Records International.

A Collection: Greatest Hits...and More contains various songs from Streisand's catalog as far back as 1975's "By the Way." Additionally, it contains the title track from The Main Event (1979) and three tracks from 1980's Guilty ("Woman in Love", "What Kind of Fool", and "Guilty"). From Memories, "Comin' In and Out of Your Life" and "Memory" were included and so were "The Way He Makes Me Feel" (1983), "Somewhere" (1985), and "All I Ask of You" (1988). In addition to the ten aforementioned songs, Streisand recorded two new tracks for the album: "We're Not Makin' Love Anymore" and "Someone That I Used to Love".

"We're Not Makin' Love Anymore" was written by Michael Bolton and Diane Warren and produced by Narada Michael Walden. It was released as a single on September 14, 1989, in four formats: 7", 12", cassette, and CD. The single peaked at number ten on Adult Contemporary chart in the United States and at number 17 on the similar chart in Canada. It also charted in the Netherlands and the United Kingdom at positions 89 and 85, respectively. An official music video was created for the single and debuted live on Entertainment Tonight on September 14; it serves as the third music video from her entire career.

"Someone That I Used to Love" was distributed as the album's second and final single in late 1989. Like its predecessor, it entered several international record charts. On the United States' Adult Contemporary chart, it peaked at number 25 and in the Netherlands, it reached number 86.

== Critical reception ==
Professional ratings
Review scores
| Source | Rating |
|---|---|
| AllMusic | 3/5 stars |

Music critics noted the recycling of older tracks on the compilation album. William Ruhlmann from AllMusic considered A Collection: Greatest Hits...and More to be "an odd compilation" and found it to make "no apparent sense". He claimed that its appeal was likely aimed at Streisand's fan base due to the upcoming holiday season: "many Streisand fans must have received it as a present for Christmas in 1989, which was probably the idea". Allison J. Waldman, author of The Barbra Streisand Scrapbook, described the album as "uninspired" and considered that to be the main reason for its lackluster commercial success.

== Commercial performance ==
The compilation album debuted on the Billboard 200 at number 80 on October 21, 1989; it was the week's third highest debut following Tracy Chapman's Crossroads and Linda Ronstadt's Cry Like a Rainstorm, Howl Like the Wind. On November 18 it peaked at number 26 on the chart; it spent a total of 25 weeks on the Billboard 200. For shipments of 500,000 copies, the collection was certified gold by the Recording Industry Association of America on November 29, 1989. It would later be certified 2× platinum on September 27, 1994. On Canada's chart, compiled by RPM, it debuted at number 65 on the week ending November 11, 1989. It eventually peaked at number 59 and was certified 2× platinum for shipments 200,000 units. At first, A Collection: Greatest Hits...and More only charted in select European territories due to its limited release; in the Netherlands, it peaked at number 10 and in the United Kingdom it peaked at number 22. In the Oceanic regions, it peaked at numbers 22 and 40 in Australia and New Zealand, respectively.

When the album was reissued in 1997 in several European countries, it charted on the album charts in Belgium, Norway, and Sweden. It reached the number one spot on the charts in the two latter countries, topping the charts for three consecutive weeks in Norway and four consecutive weeks in Sweden. On the Wallonia version of the Ultratop chart in Belgium, it peaked at number 49. Following the release of Streisand's album Guilty Pleasures in 2005, A Collection: Greatest Hits...and More was ranked at number 83 on the PROMUSICAE chart in Spain. Despite not charting in either Finland or France, the album received platinum certifications in both territories.

== Track listing ==
A Collection: Greatest Hits...and More – Standard edition
| No. | Title | Writer(s) | Producer(s) | Length |
|---|---|---|---|---|
| 1. | "We're Not Makin' Love Anymore" | Michael Bolton; Diane Warren | Narada Michael Walden | 5:33 |
| 2. | "Woman in Love" (from Guilty, 1980) | Barry Gibb; Robin Gibb | B. Gibb; Albhy Galuten; Karl Richardson | 3:51 |
| 3. | "All I Ask of You" (from Till I Loved You, 1988) | Andrew Lloyd Webber; Charles Hart; Richard Stilgoe | Phil Ramone | 4:01 |
| 4. | "Comin' In and Out of Your Life" (from Memories, 1981) | Richard Parker; Bobby Whiteside | Webber | 4:09 |
| 5. | "What Kind of Fool" (with Barry Gibb) (from Guilty) | B. Gibb; Galuten | B. Gibb; Galuten; Richardson | 4:07 |
| 6. | "The Main Event/Fight" (from The Main Event, 1979) | Paul Jabara; Bruce Roberts; Bob Esty | Esty | 4:54 |
| 7. | "Someone That I Used to Love" | Gerry Goffin; Michael Masser | Masser | 4:21 |
| 8. | "By the Way" (from Lazy Afternoon, 1975) | Barbra Streisand; Rupert Holmes | Jeffrey Lesser; Holmes | 2:56 |
| 9. | "Guilty" (with Barry Gibb) (from Guilty) | B. Gibb; R. Gibb; Maurice Gibb | B. Gibb; Galuten; Richardson | 4:23 |
| 10. | "Memory" (from Memories) | Webber; T. S. Eliot; Trevor Nunn | Webber | 3:55 |
| 11. | "The Way He Makes Me Feel" (from Yentl, 1983) | Alan Bergman; Marilyn Bergman; Michel Legrand | Ramone; Dave Grusin | 4:11 |
| 12. | "Somewhere" (from The Broadway Album, 1985) | Leonard Bernstein; Stephen Sondheim | David Foster | 4:55 |
| Total length: | | | | 51:16 |

== Personnel ==
Credits adapted from the liner notes of the standard edition of A Collection: Greatest Hits...and More.

- Barbra Streisand – lead vocalist, executive producer
- John Arrias – supervisor
- Nancy Donald – art direction
- Bob Esty – producer (track 6)
- David Foster – producer (track 12)
- Albhy Galuten – producer (tracks 2, 5, 9)
- Barry Gibb – producer (tracks 2, 5, 9)
- Bernie Grundman – mastering
- Dave Grusin – producer (track 11)
- Rupert Holmes – producer (track 8)
- Jay Landers – A&R for Columbia Records
- Jeffrey Lesser – producer (track 8)
- Michael Masser – producer (track 7)
- Sheila Metzner – photography
- Phil Ramone – producer (tracks 3, 11)
- Karl Richardson – producer (tracks 2, 5, 9)
- Kim Skalecki – production coordinator
- Narada Michael Walden – producer (track 1)
- Andrew Lloyd Webber – producer (tracks 4, 10)

== Charts ==
Chart performance for A Collection: Greatest Hits...and More
| Chart (1989–2010) | Peak position |
|---|---|
| Australian Albums (ARIA) | 22 |
| Australian Albums (Kent Music Report) | 16 |
| Belgian Albums (Ultratop Wallonia) | 49 |
| Canada Top Albums/CDs (RPM) | 59 |
| Dutch Albums (Album Top 100) | 10 |
| European Albums (Music & Media) | 38 |
| Finnish Albums (Suomen virallinen lista) | 4 |
| Hungarian Albums (MAHASZ) | 24 |
| New Zealand Albums (RMNZ) | 40 |
| Norwegian Albums (VG-lista) | 1 |
| Spanish Albums (Promusicae) | 83 |
| Swedish Albums (Sverigetopplistan) | 1 |
| UK Albums (Official Charts) | 22 |
| US Billboard 200 | 26 |

== Certifications and sales ==
Certifications for A Collection: Greatest Hits...and More
| Region | Certification | Certified units/sales |
|---|---|---|
| Australia (ARIA) | Platinum | 70,000^{^} |
| Canada (Music Canada) | 2× Platinum | 200,000^{^} |
| Finland (Musiikkituottajat) | Gold | 42,348 |
| France (SNEP) | Platinum | 300,000 |
| Norway (IFPI Norway) | Gold | 25,000^{*} |
| Sweden (GLF) | Gold | 50,000^{^} |
| United Kingdom (BPI) | Gold | 100,000^{^} |
| United States (RIAA) | 2× Platinum | 2,000,000^{^} |
^{*} Sales figures based on certification alone.^{^} Shipments figures based on certification alone.

== See also ==
- List of number-one albums in Norway
- List of number-one singles and albums in Sweden
