= Come Tomorrow =

Come Tomorrow may refer to:

- Come Tomorrow (album) by Dave Matthews Band
- "Come Tomorrow" (Barbra Streisand and Barry Gibb song), 2005
- "Come Tomorrow", a song by Chicane from the album Somersault
- "Come Tomorrow" (Marie Knight song), a song by Marie Knight, later a hit for the band Manfred Mann
- "Come Tomorrow", a 1970 song by the British band Vanity Fare
- "Come Tomorrow", a song by Xentrix from the album Kin
