= Night of My Life =

Night of My Life may refer to:

- "Night of My Life" (Barbra Streisand song), a song by Barbra Streisand from her 31st studio album Guilty Pleasures
- "Night of My Life" (Damien Leith song), a song by Damien Leith from his live album The Winner's Journey
