= Stranger in a Strange Land (Barbra Streisand song) =

Single by Barbra Streisand

from the album Guilty Pleasures
- Released: August 16, 2005
- Studio: Hit Factory Criteria (Miami, FL)
- Genre: Pop
- Length: 4:50
- Label: Columbia
- Songwriters: Ashley Gibb; Barry Gibb; Stephen Gibb
- Producers: Barry Gibb; John Merchant

Barbra Streisand singles chronology
"I Won't Be the One to Let Go" (2002)	"Stranger in a Strange Land" (2005)	"Night of My Life" (2005)

"Stranger in a Strange Land" is a song recorded by American singer Barbra Streisand for her 31st studio album, Guilty Pleasures (2005). It was released as the album's lead single on August 16, 2005, by Columbia Records. The track was written by Ashley Gibb, Barry Gibb and Stephen Gibb while production was handled by Barry Gibb and John Merchant. It serves as the first of 11 reunion collaborations with Barry Gibb, who Streisand had last collaborated with on Guilty (1980). The single was released digitally and physically distributed on CD and DVD, with some editions including the song's official music video.

The composition is essentially a pop song and contains lyrics referencing individuals who have lost a loved one due to war. Barry Gibb's work on the track was lauded by music critics. Commercially, "Stranger in a Strange Land" entered the charts in Scotland and the United Kingdom, in addition to peaking at number 39 on Billboard's Adult Contemporary chart in the United States. An Amazon.com exclusive, the music video was released for streaming alongside the song and features clips of Streisand interspersed with scenes of soldiers during the Iraq War.

== Background and release ==
"Stranger in a Strange Land" was taken from Streisand's 31st studio album, Guilty Pleasures (2005). The parent album serves as a reunion piece between the singer and musician Barry Gibb, with whom she had previously worked on Guilty (1980). Guilty Pleasures was officially announced on August 29, 2005, and was described as a collaborative effort between Gibb and Streisand. "Stranger in a Strange Land" was written by Ashley Gibb, Barry Gibb and Stephen Gibb while production was handled by Barry Gibb and John Merchant. The track includes backing vocals from singers Beth Cohen and Leesa Richards, in addition to Barry Gibbs, who backed for Streisand on each of the album's 11 songs.

The song was released on August 16, 2005, through Columbia Records as the first of three singles from Guilty Pleasures. Distributed digitally, and as both a CD single and DVD single, the standard edition CD features the album version of "Stranger in a Strange Land" while the promotional version uses the radio edit of the song instead. In the United Kingdom, a maxi CD single was distributed and includes Streisand and Barry Gibb's 1980 duet "Guilty", the official music video for "Stranger in a Strange Land", and the album version of the single. A DVD single was released in Greece featuring the music video and four television advertisements used to promote "Guilty".

Directed by Rick Walker, the official music video for "Stranger in a Strange Land" was first released to Amazon.com, also on August 16, 2005, as a streaming-only video for members to view. The clip, serving in dedication to fallen troops that lost their lives during the Iraq War, features photographs and videos of the individuals, their family members, and their memorials interspersed with scenes of Streisand performing the song live in a recording studio.

== Composition and lyrics ==
A pop track, "Stranger in a Strange Land", according to Stephen Thomas Erlewine from AllMusic, serves as one of Barry Gibb's many attempts to "update his signature sound" on Guilty Pleasures. According to the official sheet music published by the Warner Music Group, the song is written in the key of D major with a moderately slow beat consisting of 96 beats per minute. Accompanied by the instrumentation of a piano and guitar, Streisand's vocals range from A_{3} to D_{5}. Lyrically, Streisand dedicates the song to "soldiers who have perished 'fighting someone else's war'". In the track, she sings: "You may be someone else's sweetheart, fighting someone else's war / And if you suffer for the millions, then it's what you're fighting for." During the chorus, Streisand assures a deceased loved one that: "Somewhere in the lonely night, your flame is burning bright / I know it's how I'm gonna stay, for a stranger in a strange land far away."

== Reception ==
A staff member from Billboard described the single as "priceless" and a "positive yet poignant timely expression". The reviewer also acclaimed Streisand's vocal performance and Barry Gibb's contributions to the production. Also impressed, Tom Santopietro, author of The Importance of Being Barbra: The Brilliant, Tumultuous Career of Barbra Streisand, applauded its "catchy melody". Stephen Thomas Erlewine from AllMusic praised Gibb's production work on "Stranger in a Strange Land" (and on single "Night of My Life" and album track "Hideaway") for "proudly stick[ing] to unfashionable pop styles".

"Stranger in a Strange Land" did not enter the Billboard Hot 100 in the United States, but did reach the same publication's Adult Contemporary chart, where it peaked at number 39. On the UK Singles Chart, according to the Official Charts Company (OCC), the single did not reach the top 100 of the chart, but did peak at number 111 on October 29, 2005. On the official chart in Scotland, also compiled by OCC, it debuted and peaked at number 66, becoming the week's fifteenth highest ranking entry.

== Track listings and formats ==
Standard edition CD single

1. "Stranger in a Strange Land" – 4:48

UK maxi CD single

1. "Stranger in a Strange Land" – 4:48
2. "Guilty" – 4:24
3. "Stranger in a Strange Land" (Music Video) – 4:05

Greece DVD single

1. "Stranger in a Strange Land" (Music Video) – 4:05
2. "Guilty" (4x TV Spots) – 3:00

US promotional CD single

1. "Stranger in a Strange Land" (Radio Edit) – 4:05

== Charts ==
Chart (2005)	Peak position
Scottish Singles Sales (Official Charts)	66
UK Singles (Official Charts Company)	111
US Adult Contemporary (Billboard)	39
