= Someone That I Used to Love =

Song originally recorded by Bette Midler in 1977

Single by Natalie Cole

from the album Don't Look Back
- B-side: "Don't Look Back"
- Released: April 1980
- Recorded: 1980
- Genre: Adult contemporary
- Length: 4:05
- Label: Capitol
- Songwriters: Michael Masser, Gerry Goffin
- Producer: Michael Masser

Natalie Cole singles chronology
""What You Won't Do For Love" w/ Peabo Bryson" (1980)	"Someone That I Used to Love" (1980)	"Hold On" (1980)

"Someone That I Used to Love" is a torch song written by Michael Masser and lyricist Gerry Goffin that first became a success for Natalie Cole in 1980.

== Unreleased Bette Midler recording ==
When the song was newly written, Masser and Goffin personally pitched "Someone That I Used to Love" to Brooks Arthur at the Record Plant where Arthur was overseeing production of the 1977 Bette Midler album Broken Blossom. Feeling the song would be a surefire hit single for Midler, Arthur called her into studio to hear the song, and then with her endorsement Arthur called in arranger Artie Butler to orchestrate for a recording session. (Brooks Arthur quote:) "In a matter of 72 hours, the [track] was done. We had to rush it [since] Masser [insisted we] commit to [the song] right away [or he'd give it] to someone else".

Arthur was happy with the finished track, feeling it had the hit potential of his one previous mega-success: the 1975 hit "At Seventeen" by Janis Ian; however (Brooks Arthur quote:) "I get a call a couple of days later from Bette [at around] two, three, four in the morning, and she says: 'I don't want to release the song...My manager Aaron Russo didn't feel the album needed another gushy ballad, it needed more energy.' ...We [argued] until four, five, six, seven in the morning - we did this for about two days straight."

Eventually Russo solicited Atlantic Records honcho Ahmet Ertegun to side with him against the release of "Someone That I Used to Love": with Ertegun opining to replace the track with a high-spirited number along the lines of Midler's first two singles "Boogie Woogie Bugle Boy" and "Friends", and ultimately "Someone That I Used to Love" was dropped in favor of Midler's new recording of the 1954 Sarah Vaughn hit "Make Yourself Comfortable".

== Natalie Cole version ==
Three years passed before "Someone That I Used to Love" was recorded and released, with Michael Masser producing and playing piano on the Natalie Cole version, issued as the lead single from her 1980 album Don't Look Back.

The first single from Cole not produced by Chuck Jackson and Marvin Yancy, "Someone That I Used to Love" afforded Cole a considerable comeback reaching #21 on the Billboard Hot 100 where she had last ranked with the 1977-78 Top Ten hit "Our Love": however she would again be absent from the Hot 100 until 1985 and not reappear in the Top 40 until 1987.

"Someone That I Used to Love" also peaked at #21 on the Billboard R&B chart and is therefore not among Cole's biggest R&B hits: the track did afford Cole her first Top Ten Adult Contemporary hit (#3).

Chart (1980)	Peak position
U.S. Billboard Hot 100	21
U.S. Billboard Adult Contemporary	3
U.S. Billboard Hot Soul Singles	21

Masser reunited with Cole to produce two Goffin co-writes for Cole's 1988 album Good to Be Back including the #1 R&B hit "Miss You Like Crazy" which reached #7 on the Hot 100 (the other track: "Starting Over Again" peaked at #5 on the Adult Contemporary chart where "Miss You Like Crazy" had reached #1). Cole's 1994 Christmas album Holly & Ivy introduced another Masser/Goffin composition, "No More Blue Christmas", produced by Masser.

== Barbra Streisand version ==
"Someone That I Used to Love"

Single by Barbra Streisand

from the album A Collection: Greatest Hits...and More
- Released: 1989
- Genre: Adult contemporary; ballad
- Length: 4:21
- Label: Columbia Records
- Songwriters: Michael Masser; Gerry Goffin
- Producer: Michael Masser

Barbra Streisand singles chronology
"We're Not Makin' Love Anymore" (1989)	"Someone That I Used to Love" (1989)	"Speak Low" (1993)

Masser produced "Someone That I Used to Love" for Barbra Streisand, one of two new tracks for her 1989 anthology A Collection: Greatest Hits...and More, issued as an "airplay only" single that reached #25 on the Adult Contemporary chart. "Someone That I Used to Love" was released in Europe with the 1981 Barry Gibb duet "What Kind of Fool" as B-side but did not become a major hit, peaking at #86 on the Dutch Single Top 100.

== Other versions ==
- "Someone That I Used to Love" has also been recorded by Marco Sison (album Memories/ 1999) and as an instrumental by pianist Robin Spielberg (album With a Song in My Heart/ 2011).

== Samples ==
- The 2005 hit "Heard 'Em Say" by Kanye West samples a piano riff from Natalie Cole's "Someone That I Used to Love".
