= Guilty Pleasures (Barbra Streisand album) =

Studio album by Barbra Streisand
- Released: September 20, 2005
- Recorded: April–June, 2005
- Studios: Hit Factory Criteria (Miami), Sony (Los Angeles)
- Genres: Pop; soul
- Length: 47:43
- Label: Columbia
- Producer: Barry Gibb • John Merchant

Barbra Streisand chronology
The Movie Album (2003)	Guilty Pleasures (2005)	Live in Concert 2006 (2007)

Singles from Guilty Pleasures
- 1. "Stranger in a Strange Land" Released: August 16, 2005; 2. "Night of My Life" Released: September 27, 2005; 3. "Come Tomorrow" Released: December 19, 2005

Professional ratings
Review scores
Source	Rating
AllMusic	4/5 stars
The New York Times	Positive

Guilty Pleasures is the thirty-first studio album by American singer Barbra Streisand. It was released in September 2005 in conjunction with Barry Gibb, who co-produced the album and co-wrote all of the tracks, many of them with his brother Barry and sons Stephen and Ashley. In Ireland and the UK, the album is titled Guilty Too. It is the follow-up of Streisand's 1980 album Guilty, which also featured Barry Gibb. The album features covers of Gibb's late brother Andy's song "(Our Love) Don't Throw It All Away"; and "Letting Go", a song that Barry Gibb recorded for the Hawks soundtrack.

In the United States, the album peaked at number 5 and has been certified Gold (500,000 copies sold), continuing Streisand's record of achieving the most gold and platinum records for a female artist, and in second place in general behind Elvis Presley. The album also hit the UK Albums Chart, peaking at number 3 and has been certified Platinum (over 300,000 copies sold). Both albums are considered partial-collaboration, since Streisand not only did two duets with Gibb on each, but his backing vocals are clearly present on most tracks. They also appear together on the albums covers.

== DualDisc edition ==
A DualDisc edition of the album was released which contained the entire album in PCM Stereo, behind the scenes footage of the making of the album, interviews with Streisand and Gibb and 4 video performances, including an alternate piano version of "Letting Go".

== Track listing ==
1. "Come Tomorrow" with Barry Gibb (Ashley Gibb, Barry Gibb, Stephen Gibb) – 5:01
2. "Stranger in a Strange Land" (A. Gibb, B. Gibb, S. Gibb) – 4:50
3. "Hideaway" (A. Gibb, B. Gibb) – 4:14
4. "It's Up to You" (A. Gibb, B. Gibb) – 3:32
5. "Night of My Life" (A. Gibb, B. Gibb) – 4:01
6. "Above the Law" with Barry Gibb (A. Gibb, Streisand, B. Gibb, S. Gibb) – 4:27
7. "Without Your Love" (A. Gibb, B. Gibb) – 3:48
8. "All the Children" (A. Gibb, B. Gibb, S. Gibb) – 5:14
9. "Golden Dawn" (A. Gibb, B. Gibb, S. Gibb) – 4:40
10. "(Our Love) Don't Throw It All Away" (B. Gibb, Blue Weaver) – 4:01
11. "Letting Go" (George Bitzer, B. Gibb) – 3:53

== Personnel ==
- Barbra Streisand – vocals
- Barry Gibb – vocals, guitar, string arrangement
- Dan Warner – guitar
- Doug Emery – keyboard, programming, string arrangement
- Eero Turunen – keyboard
- Julio Hernandez – bass
- Lee Levin – drums
- Richard Bravo – percussion
- Tom Scott – saxophone on "Come Tomorrow" and "Hideaway"
- Beth Cohen – vocals on "Night of My Life"
- Leesa Richards – vocals on "Night of My Life"
- Peter Graves – string arrangement, conductor
- Larry Warrilow – string arrangement

Production

- Barry Gibb – producer
- John Merchant – producer, recording, engineering, mixing
- Javier Carrion – additional engineering
- Patrick Magee – assistant engineering
- Ethan Carlson – assistant engineering
- Bob Ludwig – mastering

== Charts ==
=== Weekly charts ===
Chart (2005)	Peak position
Australian Albums (ARIA)	22
Austrian Albums (Ö3 Austria)	20
Belgian Albums (Ultratop Flanders)	12
Belgian Albums (Ultratop Wallonia)	23
Canadian Albums (Billboard)	9
Danish Albums (Hitlisten)	30
Dutch Albums (Album Top 100)	6
French Albums (SNEP)	59
German Albums (Offizielle Top 100)	31
Greek Albums Chart	15
Hungarian Albums (MAHASZ)	36
Irish Albums Chart	13
Italian Albums (FIMI)	34
New Zealand Albums (RMNZ)	12
Norwegian Albums (VG-lista)	29
Scottish Albums (Official Charts)	6
Spanish Albums (Promusicae)	21
Swedish Albums (Sverigetopplistan)	13
Swiss Albums (Schweizer Hitparade)	51
Taiwanese Albums (Five Music)	8
UK Albums (Official Charts)	3
US Billboard 200	5

=== Year-end charts ===
Chart (2005)	Position
UK Albums (OCC)	46

== Certifications and sales ==
Region	Certification	Certified units/sales
Canada (Music Canada)	Gold	50,000^{^}
Ireland (IRMA)	Platinum	15,000^{^}
New Zealand (RMNZ)	Gold	7,500^{^}
United Kingdom (BPI)	Platinum	300,000^{^}
United States (RIAA)	Gold	509,000
^{^} Shipments figures based on certification alone.
