= Promises (Barbra Streisand song) =

Single by Barbra Streisand

from the album Guilty
- B-side: "Make It Like a Memory"
- Released: May 1981
- Recorded: 1980
- Studio: Criteria Studios (Miami, FL)
- Genre: Disco
- Length: 4:20
- Label: Columbia Records
- Songwriters: Barry Gibb; Robin Gibb
- Producer: Gibb-Galuten-Richardson

Barbra Streisand singles chronology
"What Kind of Fool" (1981)	"Promises" (1981)	"Comin' In and Out of Your Life" (1981)

Barry Gibb singles chronology
"What Kind of Fool" (1981)	"Promises" (1981)	"Comin' In and Out of Your Life" (1981)

"Promises" is the title of a 1981 song by Barbra Streisand. The song was written by Barry Gibb and Robin Gibb, who also provide backing vocals. It was the fourth of four singles released from her album Guilty.

"Promises" narrowly missed the Pop Top 40 in the U.S., peaking at number 48. However, it reached the Top 10 on the Adult Contemporary charts, reaching number 8, and number 5 in Canada.

== Chart history ==
Chart (1981)	Peak position
Canada RPM Adult Contemporary	5
U.S. Billboard Hot 100	48
U.S. Billboard Adult Contemporary	8
U.S. Cash Box Top 100	48
