= Night of My Life (Barbra Streisand song) =

Single by Barbra Streisand

from the album Guilty Pleasures
- Released: September 27, 2005
- Studio: Hit Factory Criteria (Miami, FL)
- Genre: Disco; pop
- Length: 4:01
- Label: Columbia
- Songwriters: Ashley Gibb; Barry Gibb
- Producers: Barry Gibb; John Merchant

Barbra Streisand singles chronology
"Stranger in a Strange Land" (2005)	"Night of My Life" (2005)	"Come Tomorrow" (2005)

"Night of My Life" is a song recorded by American singer Barbra Streisand for her 31st studio album, Guilty Pleasures (2005). It was released as the album's second single on September 27, 2005, by Columbia Records. The track was written by Ashley Gibb and Barry Gibb while production was handled by Barry Gibb and John Merchant. It serves as one of Streisand's first of 11 reunion collaborations with Barry Gibb since their work on her album Guilty in 1980. It was released digitally and on 12" and CD in five different formats, each including various remixes of the single.

A disco and pop song, Streisand sings about the events that occur during a special night in her life. Barry Gibb's work on "Night of My Life" was praised by one music critic, although the lyrics were criticized by another for being nonsensical. Commercially, the single was successful on Billboard's dance charts, where it peaked at number two on the Dance Club Songs and number nine on the Hot Dance Singles Sales charts.

== Background and release ==
"Night of My Life" was taken from Barbra Streisand's 31st studio album, Guilty Pleasures (2005). The record serves as a reunion album between the singer and musician Barry Gibb, who she had last worked with on Guilty in 1980. The project was first announced on August 29, 2005, and was advertised as a collaborative effort between Gibb and Streisand. "Night of My Life" was written by Ashley Gibb and Barry Gibb while production was handled by Barry Gibb and John Merchant. It features backing vocals from singers Beth Cohen and Leesa Richards, in addition to Barry Gibb, who sang backup for all of the album's 11 songs.

The track was initially released by Columbia Records on August 16, 2005, as a promotional single before its official release on September 27, 2005, as the second of three singles from Guilty Pleasures. Five different physical releases occurred, with two of them being on 12" vinyl. The standard edition 12" record features four remixes by musicians Junior, John Luongo and L.E.X., while the promotional version includes two remixes titled "Love to Infinity Master Mix" and "M*A*S*H Club Mix". Three CD singles were distributed as well; the commercial CD single has the same four remixes from the standard edition 12" single, the maxi CD includes the album version of "Night of My Life" plus ten remixes, and the promotional version features six dubs and mixes as produced by Junior and L.E.X.

== Composition and lyrics ==
Primarily a disco and pop track, Stephen Thomas Erlewine from AllMusic suggested that it serves as an attempt for co-writer Barry Gibb to "update his signature sound". Also describing the song as being influenced by "light disco" music, The New York Times's Stephen Holden wrote that "Night of My Life" and album track "Come Together" show off Barry Gibb's "gift for airborne melodic hooks carried on misty whooshes and anchored by feathery beats". The song's beat is produced with "thumping drums and guitar lines that recall the disco era". It also features guitar playing by Barry Gibb and orchestra work from the Miami Symphonic Strings. Lyrically, Streisand sings about finding pleasure during a special night: "I fight to the end for the night of my life / And nothing can get in my way / I shout out my struggles / And send out a message to you".

== Reception ==
Stephen Thomas Erlewine praised Gibb's production work on "Night of My Life" (and on album tracks "Stranger in a Strange Land" and "Hideaway") for "proudly stick[ing] to unfashionable pop styles". Tom Santopietro, author of The Importance of Being Barbra: The Brilliant, Tumultuous Career of Barbra Streisand, felt that the song's lyrics were nonsensical and therefore irrelevant as they "tell us nothing about the vocalist". He asked: "What is Barbra Streisand even singing about here?"

"Night of My Life" entered two dance charts, compiled by Billboard, in the United States. On the main Dance Club Songs chart, it peaked at number two, becoming Streisand's second top ten hit and first entry since her chart-topping duet with Donna Summer, "No More Tears (Enough Is Enough)", in 1979. On Billboard's Hot Dance Singles Sales component chart, which tracks the best-selling dance singles each week, "Night of My Life" peaked at number nine in 2005.

== Track listings and formats ==
Standard 12" single

- A1 "Night of My Life" (Junior's Roxy Anthem) – 7:54
- A2 "Night of My Life" (John Luongo 12" Mix) – 9:05
- B1 "Night of My Life" (L.E.X. Club Mix) – 8:50
- B2 "Night of My Life" (John Luongo 7" Mix) – 3:48

US promotional CD single

1. "Night of My Life" (L.E.X. Percussive Dub) – 9:40
2. "Night of My Life" (Junior's Beats Mix) – 6:29
3. "Night of My Life" (Junior's Percapella Dub) – 6:28
4. "Night of My Life" (Junior's Padapella Dub) – 5:58
5. "Night of My Life" (L.E.X. Radio Mix) – 4:06
6. "Night of My Life" (Junior's Radio Mix) – 3:52

US CD single

1. "Night of My Life" (Junior's Roxy Anthem) – 7:54
2. "Night of My Life" (L.E.X. Club Mix) – 8:50
3. "Night of My Life" (John Luongo 12" Mix) – 9:05
4. "Night of My Life" (John Luongo 7" Mix) – 3:48

US maxi CD single

1. "Night of My Life" (Album Version) – 3:59
2. "Night of My Life" (Junior's Roxy Anthem) – 7:54
3. "Night of My Life" (Junior's Night Club of My Life Mix) – 7:01
4. "Night of My Life" (Junior's Radio Mix) – 3:52
5. "Night of My Life" (L.E.X. Club Mix) – 8:50
6. "Night of My Life" (L.E.X. Roller Coaster Club Mix) – 5:31
7. "Night of My Life" (L.E.X. Radio Mix) – 4:05
8. "Night of My Life" (John Luongo 12" Mix) – 9:05
9. "Night of My Life" (John Luongo 7" Mix) – 3:48
10. "Night of My Life" (Junior's Percapella Dub) – 6:28
11. "Night of My Life" (L.E.X. Percapella Dub) – 9:40

UK 12" promotional single

- A1 "Night of My Life" (Love to Infinity Master Mix) – 6:43
- B1 "Night of My Life" (M*A*S*H Club Mix) – 7:11

== Charts ==
Chart (2005)	Peak position
US Dance Club Songs (Billboard)	2
US Hot Dance Singles Sales (Billboard)	9
