= All I Ask of You =

1986 musical theatre single

Single by Cliff Richard and Sarah Brightman

from the album The Phantom of the Opera
- B-side: "The Phantom of the Opera Overture (Act II)"; "Only You"
- Released: 26 September 1986
- Recorded: 1986
- Genre: Operatic pop
- Length: 4:11
- Label: Polydor
- Songwriters: Andrew Lloyd Webber; Charles Hart; Richard Stilgoe
- Producer: Andrew Lloyd Webber

Cliff Richard singles chronology
"Born to Rock 'n' Roll" (1986)	"All I Ask of You" (1986)	"Slow Rivers" (1986)

Sarah Brightman singles chronology
"The Phantom of the Opera" (1986)	"All I Ask of You" (1986)	"The Music of the Night/Wishing You Were Somehow Here Again" (1986)

Music video
- "All I Ask of You" on YouTube

"All I Ask of You" is a song from the 1986 English musical The Phantom of the Opera, between characters Christine Daaé and Raoul, originally played on stage by Sarah Brightman and Steve Barton, respectively. It was written by Andrew Lloyd Webber, Charles Hart and Richard Stilgoe, and solely produced by Lloyd Webber. An operatic pop piece, its lyrics serve as dialogue between the two characters and discuss themes such as commitment and romance. Like Lloyd Webber's song "The Music of the Night", "All I Ask of You" was compared to the music found in Giacomo Puccini's 1910 opera La fanciulla del West.

Critically, the song has generally been regarded as one of the finest cuts made for The Phantom of the Opera. It was released as a single by Polydor Records on 26 September 1986 on 7-inch and 12-inch, performed by Brightman and Cliff Richard. The song achieved commercial success in several territories, including in Ireland and South Africa, where it topped the charts and the United Kingdom, where it peaked at number three. It was later certified Silver in the latter country for shipments of 250,000 copies. "All I Ask of You" has been covered by multiple artists, including The Shadows, Lloyd Webber's brother Julian, Elaine Paige, and Jackie Evancho. Susan Boyle and Donny Osmond, Josh Groban and Kelly Clarkson, and Marina Prior and Mark Vincent have also continued with duet versions of the song.

A notable cover of "All I Ask of You" was recorded by Barbra Streisand for her studio album Till I Loved You (1988). It was released as the record's second single on 15 December 1988 by Columbia Records as a 7-inch, 12-inch, and CD. It was generally noted as a standout track on Till I Loved You and was commercially successful, entering the charts in the Netherlands, the United Kingdom, and on the United States' Adult Contemporary chart.

== Background and release ==
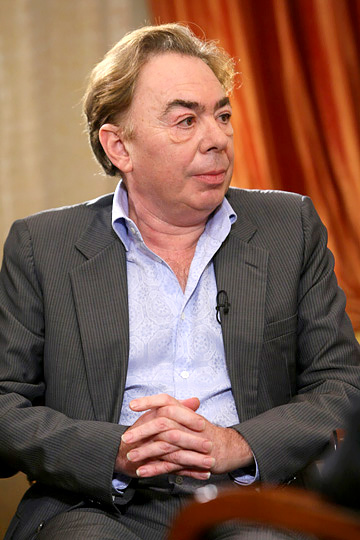
Andrew Lloyd Webber, co-writer and sole producer of "All I Ask of You".

"All I Ask of You" was written and produced by Andrew Lloyd Webber, while Charles Hart and Richard Stilgoe provided the lyrics for the track. It was created specifically for the 1986 English musical The Phantom of the Opera, which was developed by Lloyd Webber and served as a live adaptation of Gaston Leroux's 1910 novel of the same name. It is performed by characters Christine Daaé and Raoul, where the former protests and asks for love of the latter. The song appears towards the end of Act I, immediately after it is revealed that the two characters "have met again and felt a sexual attraction". The single version of "All I Ask of You" is performed by Cliff Richard and Sarah Brightman, although Richard's vocals are replaced by Steve Barton's during the musical production and its accompanying inclusion on the live album.

In the early 2000s, Lloyd Webber was sued by the estate of Giacomo Puccini for similarities between the former's song "The Music of the Night" (1986), also from The Phantom of the Opera, and a melody titled "Quello che tacete" which was used in Puccini's 1910 opera La fanciulla del West. The matter was settled out of court between the two parties soon after the lawsuit was revealed. However, author John Snelson, who wrote a biography on Lloyd Webber in 2009, further compared "All I Ask of You" to the same aforementioned melody, citing similar "motivic connections" and "operatic and emotional cross-references" as his evidence.

Polydor, an English-based record label, first released "All I Ask of You" as a single on 26 September 1986. It was distributed in several formats. The 7-inch single features the track plus B-side "The Phantom of the Opera Overture (Act II)", which is performed by the Royal Philharmonic Orchestra. The 12-inch version features the same two aforementioned songs, but it includes a second B-side "Only You", which was featured in Lloyd Webber's 1984 musical Starlight Express. Along with its placement as the 13th track on the album for The Phantom of the Opera, a reprise of "All I Ask of You" follows on the track listing. During the reprise, lead character the Phantom, voiced by Michael Crawford, provides vocals.

Besides the accompanying live album to the musical, Richard and Brightman's version of "All I Ask of You" was not featured on any compilation album or greatest hits album until Richard released Private Collection: 1979–1988 in November 1988. Brightman did not include "All I Ask of You" on any albums either until her compilation titled The Andrew Lloyd Webber Collection was released in the United States in 1997.

== Composition and lyrics ==
Personnel working on the album for The Phantom of the Opera included recording engineer Martin Levan, conductor Michael Reed, Steve Pierce on clarinet, and Richard Wall on trumpet. The Royal Philharmonic Orchestra was headed by Lloyd Webber and David Cullen whereas the musical direction was led by Harold Prince and David Caddick.

"All I Ask of You" is a piano ballad; according to the official sheet music published by Alfred Publishing, it is written in the key of D♭ major with the partners' vocals ranging from A♭_{3} to A♭_{5}. It contains a common time with a "heartfelt" tempo consisting of 60 beats per minute. Author Ethan Mordden described the track's genre as operatic pop and noted the high vocals achieved by the singers. Lyrically, Daaé's character is singing about her desire for romance when she demands, "Say you love me every waking moment". In exchange, Raoul claims that he can fulfill her wants as long as she will "let [him] be [her] freedom". In an additional comparison to Puccini's opera, John Snelson claimed that the song's lyrics contained similar symbolism to the music found in La fanciulla del West; however, he stated that there were several differences between the two works. Although they both featured romantic symbolism, Snelson wrote that Puccini's work was much longer and contained a vocal-heavy delivery when compared to Lloyd Webber's work.

== Reception ==
Author and music historian Ethan Mordden stated that the song contains "lyrical magnificence" and noted that its brilliance helped it "accomplish wonderful things" on stage. The song was described as one of the biggest and most commercially successful hits from The Phantom of the Opera by the staff at Show Music.

"All I Ask of You" was commercially successful in several territories internationally. In the United Kingdom, it became Richard's 52nd top ten single by peaking at number three on 4 October 1986. Its success allowed it to be listed on the year-end chart in that country, where it was ranked at number 31. The song was later certified Silver by the British Phonographic Industry on 1 October 1986 for shipments of 250,000 physical copies. It topped the Irish Singles Chart for one week, replacing Status Quo's cover of "In the Army Now" (1986). The song reached the same peak in South Africa on the country's Springbok Radio chart, while in Australia, it peaked at number 24, according to the Kent Music Report.

== Track listings ==
7-inch single

- A1 "All I Ask of You" – 4:11
- B1 "The Phantom of the Opera Overture (Act II)" (performed by the Royal Philharmonic Orchestra) – 2:42

12-inch single

- A1 "All I Ask of You" – 4:11
- B1 "The Phantom of the Opera Overture (Act II)" (performed by the Royal Philharmonic Orchestra) – 2:42
- B2 "Only You" – 3:37

== Charts ==
Weekly charts

Chart (1986–87)	Peak position
Australia (Kent Music Report)	24
Ireland (IRMA)	1
South Africa (Springbok Radio)	1
UK Singles (Official Charts)	3

Year-end charts

Chart (1986)	Position
UK Singles (Official Charts Company)	29

Chart (1987)	Position
Australia (Kent Music Report)	87

== Certifications ==
Region	Certification	Certified units/sales
United Kingdom (BPI)	Silver	250,000^{^}
^{^} Shipments figures based on certification alone.

== Cover versions ==
Several musicians have created their own versions of "All I Ask of You". The Shadows created an instrumental version of the song in 1989 for their covers album, Steppin' to the Shadows. As a duet, Stephanie Lawrence and Carl Wayne included it on The Andrew Lloyd Webber Collection in 1991. It is covered by Webber's younger brother and cello player Julian on the 2001 album, Lloyd Webber Plays Lloyd Webber. A separate choral arrangement of "All I Ask of You" appears on The King's Singers's Chanson d'Amour (1992). Elaine Paige released a solo version for Essential Musicals in 2006. American vocalist Jackie Evancho's version of "All I Ask of You" was included on her 2011 studio album Dream with Me and peaked at number four on Billboard's Classical Digital Songs component chart following its release.

On Susan Boyle's album Standing Ovation: The Greatest Songs from the Stage (2012), she and featured artist Donny Osmond recorded a cover of "All I Ask of You"; in addition, Boyle also recorded two other Lloyd Webber compositions. American singers Josh Groban and Kelly Clarkson performed the duet for the former's musical-influenced seventh studio album, Stages (2015). After its release, it entered and peaked on the Pop Digital Songs in the United States at number 32. Groban had previously performed "All I Ask of You" to David Foster during an audition to sing "The Prayer" live at the 41st Annual Grammy Awards with Celine Dion. Marina Prior and Mark Vincent, both Australian vocalists, covered it for their 2016 collaborative effort, Together.

== Barbra Streisand version ==
"All I Ask of You"

Single by Barbra Streisand

from the album Till I Loved You
- B-side: "On My Way to You"; "Memory"; "Send In the Clowns"; "Life Story"; "Emotion"; "Make No Mistake, He's Mine"; "Since I Fell for You"
- Released: 15 December 1988
- Length: 4:02
- Label: Columbia
- Songwriters: Andrew Lloyd Webber; Charles Hart; Richard Stilgoe
- Producer: Phil Ramone

Barbra Streisand singles chronology
"Till I Loved You" (1988)	"All I Ask of You" (1988)	"What Were We Thinking Of" (1989)

=== Background and release ===
American singer Barbra Streisand recorded a cover of "All I Ask of You" for her 29th studio album, Till I Loved You (1988). It was released as the album's second single on 15 December 1988 by Columbia Records. Till I Loved You is a concept album chronicling the different stages during a romantic relationship, where the beginning songs detail the good times and the final tracks discuss a painful breakup; accordingly, "All I Ask of You" was placed as the record's sixth track. It was produced by frequent Streisand collaborator Phil Ramone. Considering its placement on Till I Loved You, it was noted by The New York Times's Stephen Holden as the only song that is not a "nontheatrical pop tune". Streisand would later include her cover on two of her greatest hits albums: A Collection: Greatest Hits...and More in 1989 and The Essential Barbra Streisand in 2002.

Streisand's cover was released physically in several formats by Columbia Records. The standard edition 7-inch release featured B-side track "On My Way to You" while the promotional version used "All I Ask of You" as both the A-side and B-side. In Spain, a 7-inch record with no B-side was distributed. Three different extended plays (EPs) were released in the United Kingdom. The 7-inch and 12-inch varieties included tracks such as "Somewhere", "Memory", "Send In the Clowns, "On My Way to You", "Life Story", and "Emotion"; both of these editions were also released on CD. The limited edition EP featured "On My Way to You", "Make No Mistake, He's Mine", "Since I Fell for You", and a large colored poster of Streisand from the Till I Loved You photoshoots.

=== Reception ===
Stephen Holden called the song one of the "moments of sweeping majesty" on Till I Loved You. He stated that Streisand "makes a powerful case [by] negotiating its octave vocal dives with a grand finesse while taking the song at a pleasingly brisk pace". Los Angeles Times's Paul Grein highlighted the song as the greatest track on the album. He compared its dramatics to Streisand's 1981 single "Memory" and later wrote, "but [it] is much warmer and less grandiose. It's one of Streisand's greatest recordings".

The single did not enter the Billboard Hot 100 in the United States, but it did reach the same publication's Adult Contemporary chart. "All I Ask of You" also entered the charts in the Netherlands and the United Kingdom. In the former country, it peaked at number 56 after entering at number 79. In the United Kingdom, it peaked at number 77 and spent five weeks charting.

=== Track listings and formats ===
Standard 7-inch single

- A1 "All I Ask of You" – 4:02
- B1 "On My Way to You" – 3:43

Promotional 7-inch single

- A1 "All I Ask of You" – 4:02
- B1 "All I Ask of You" – 4:02

Spain 7-inch single

- A1 "All I Ask of You" – 4:02

United Kingdom 7-inch and CD EP

- A1/1. "All I Ask of You" – 4:02
- A2/2. "Somewhere" – 4:51
- B1/3. "Memory" – 3:52
- B2/4. "Send In the Clowns" – 4:39

United Kingdom 12-inch and CD EP

- A1/1. "All I Ask of You" – 4:02
- A2/2. "On My Way to You" – 3:43
- B1/3. "Life Story" – 5:02
- B2/4. "Emotion" – 4:59

United Kingdom 12-inch limited edition EP

- A1 "All I Ask of You" – 4:02
- A2 "On My Way to You" – 3:43
- B1 "Make No Mistake, He's Mine" – 4:12
- B2 "Since I Fell for You" – 3:23

=== Charts ===
Chart (1988–1989)	Peak position
Netherlands (Dutch Top 40 Tipparade)	21
Netherlands (Single Top 100)	56
UK Singles (Official Charts)	77
US Adult Contemporary (Billboard)	15

== See also ==
- List of number-one singles of 1986 (Ireland)
