= Till I Loved You (album) =

Studio album by Barbra Streisand
- Released: October 25, 1988
- Studios: B&J Studios, Record Plant, Lion Share Recording and Westlake Audio (Los Angeles, California); Cherokee Studios, Conway Studios, Sunset Sound and Ocean Way Recording (Hollywood, California); Zebra Studios (Studio City, California)
- Genre: Pop
- Length: 47:07
- Label: Columbia
- Producers: Quincy Jones; Barbra Streisand; Phil Ramone; Burt Bacharach; Carole Bayer Sager; Denny Diante

Barbra Streisand chronology
Nuts (1987)	Till I Loved You (1988)	A Collection: Greatest Hits...and More (1989)

Till I Loved You is the twenty-fifth studio album by American singer Barbra Streisand, released on October 25, 1988, on Columbia Records. The album was notable for both its thematic structure (chronicling the beginning, middle, and end of a romance) and its high-budget production, with many guest writers, producers, and musicians: Burt Bacharach and Carole Bayer Sager offered three brand new songs to the album, Quincy Jones produced "The Places You Find Love", with Luther Vandross and Dionne Warwick adding backing vocals.

The title track, a duet between Streisand and then-boyfriend Don Johnson, became a Top 40 hit on the Billboard Hot 100.

== History ==
After two successful projects with The Broadway Album – Streisand's 1985 return to her stage roots – and One Voice – her first full-length live concert recorded in September 1986, which was issued on both disc and video with benefit purposes, she decided to make a return to the pop scene. Till I Loved You was conceived as a lushly romantic album, with a particular concept – it followed the stages of a relationship from the beginning (in songs like "The Places You Find Love") to the end ("Some Good Things Never Last"), and then wrapped up the theme with a positive song about the future ("One More Time Around").

Many writers, producers and musicians appeared on the album, making it a high-budget project as with Streisand's previous pop mainstream project, 1984's Emotion.

The opening song, "The Places You Find Love" was produced by Quincy Jones. Later, the song appeared on his own album Back on the Block, which received a Grammy Award for Album of the Year in 1991. Streisand's version features an all-star backup group - background vocals are credited to Luther Vandross, Dionne Warwick, James Ingram, Howard Hewett, Jennifer Holliday, Peggi Blu, Clif Magness, Siedah Garrett and Edie Lehmann. On Back on the Block's version, Garrett sang the first verse and chorus, followed by Chaka Khan singing the second verse. Jones utilized the same arrangement and background singers for his album, and also incorporated some African chanting during the bridge and climax of the song. "The Places You Find Love" was the only time Streisand and Jones have worked together (until "We Are The World 25 (For Haiti)" in 2010).

The album's title track is a duet with the Miami Vice actor Don Johnson, whom Streisand was dating at the time of recording. The track was the love theme from Goya, a project developed by CBS Records, Freddie Gershon and Allan Carr for opera singer Plácido Domingo playing artist Francisco Goya. In 2006, in an interview with TV host Jonathan Ross, Johnson recalled about the recording of the song:

... It was amazing. First of all she's probably the diva of all time, in terms of voices... I was under contract to Columbia at the time – her studio. Of course, at the time I was the "biggy-wow-wow" in television and film and with Miami Vice. And I'd just put out a record that had made the Top 5. This is how I met Barbra – Columbia came to me and said, "Would you like to do a duet with Barbra?" At first I said it's a different kind of music. Then I went, "What are you, crazy? You've got to do a duet with Barbra Streisand!

There was studio glass between us so that she could watch me sing – because it was a duet. It was a little nerve wracking, as I recall. She's a perfectionist... She's impeccable about everything, impeccable about every note. I want to be that way; it's just that I don't have the equipment that she has to do it. She is a wonderful, wonderful person. She's one of the most intelligent persons I've ever been around in my life, and she's very funny and has a humongous heart. She's a really terrific person.

— Don Johnson

Burt Bacharach produced and wrote three tracks on Till I Loved You with his wife and lyricist Carole Bayer Sager. According to his own words, "Barbra has great range. Nobody sounds like her when she's up that high, with that kind of clarity and purity. You can tell right away it's her. You can't say that about many singers."

Phil Ramone produced the song "All I Ask of You", which was originally a duet in Andrew Lloyd Webber's musical The Phantom of the Opera. Ramone commented:

... It's an interesting concept – messing with Andrew Lloyd Webber stuff. It's not easy. Barbra's always approached music from both a lyrical point of view and a sensibility of, ‘why can’t I sing this? Why wouldn’t I sing this? Why wouldn’t I sing this to him?’ You know, it's established for too long that it's a duet. You can take a song and re-voice it or change keys. But this song is written as a duet. I don’t know, we just took a shot... We worked on it so it could be a meaningful song, as it is.

You always call [the lyricists]. It's one of the classic things that Barbra's capable of. She's not afraid to make a change, make a lyrical point more poignant. Her friends, you know, are the Bergmans. Barbra's the queen of listening and looking at lyrics. All of us who have been around great songs know what that means.

— Phil Ramone

== Critical reception ==
Professional ratings
Review scores
Source	Rating
AllMusic	3/5 stars

The album received mixed reviews from music critics. William Ruhlmann from AllMusic gave the album a mixed review and wrote that although the album "was a big-budget effort" it's "like a movie with a great star, great production values, and a mediocre script, so how much you liked it depended on how much you liked Streisand, and it sold to her fans only". Paul Grein from the Los Angeles Times gave the album a favorable review and elected "All I Ask of You" as the best song of the record. He also wrote that the album "marked improvement over “Emotion” in that Streisand is no longer trying to compete with singers half her age for the hearts and minds of the teen-agers who buy singles and watch MTV". People gave the album an unfavorable review in which the author wrote that the best part of the record is "the sheer pleasure of hearing Streisand's voice" and some tunes like "All I Ask of You" and "Some Good Things Never Last" but concluded that "there are moments when it almost doesn't matter what she's singing; you just wish it would never end."

== Track listing ==
No.	Title	Writer(s)	Length
1.	"The Places You Find Love"	Glen Ballard; Clif Magness	5:09
2.	"On My Way to You"	Alan Bergman (lyrics); Marilyn Bergman (lyrics); Michel Legrand (music)	3:44
3.	"Till I Loved You" (duet with Don Johnson)	Maury Yeston	5:10
4.	"Love Light"	Burt Bacharach; Carole Bayer Sager	4:32
5.	"All I Ask of You"	Andrew Lloyd Webber (music); Charles Hart (lyrics); Richard Stilgoe (lyrics)	4:02
6.	"You and Me for Always"	Bacharach; Bayer Sager	3:49
7.	"Why Let It Go"	Alan Bergman (lyrics); Marilyn Bergman (lyrics); Alan Hawkshaw (music); Barry Mason	4:25
8.	"Two People"	Barbra Streisand (music); Alan Bergman (lyrics); Marilyn Bergman (lyrics)	3:40
9.	"What Were We Thinking Of"	Antonina Armato; Scott Cutler	4:28
10.	"Some Good Things Never Last"	Mark Radice	4:20
11.	"One More Time Around"	Bacharach; Bayer Sager; Tom Keane	3:44
Total length:			47:06

== Personnel ==
Information taken from the album's liner notes.

Vocalists and Musicians

- Barbra Streisand – lead vocals
- Randy Kerber – keyboards (1), synthesizer programming (1), Fender Rhodes (4, 6), Yamaha DX7 (4, 6), acoustic piano (7, 10), synthesizers (11)
- Larry Williams – keyboards (1), synthesizer programming (1)
- Rhett Lawrence – synthesizer programming (1)
- Robbie Buchanan – synthesizers (2, 7–10)
- Tom Ranier – synthesizers (2, 8)
- Randy Waldman – acoustic piano (2, 8), synthesizers (3, 5, 7, 9, 10), synthesizer programming (3), drum programming (3, 9)
- Michael Boddicker – synthesizers (4, 6, 11)
- Burt Bacharach – acoustic piano (6)
- Mark Radice – acoustic piano (10)
- Tom Keane – acoustic piano (11)
- Paul Jackson Jr. – guitars (1)
- Michael Landau – guitars (1)
- Jeff Baxter – guitars (3)
- Dann Huff – guitars (4, 6, 11), electric guitar (8), acoustic guitar (8)
- Michael Thompson – guitars (9)
- Louis Johnson – bass (1)
- Neil Stubenhaus – bass (4, 6, 7, 10, 11)
- John Robinson – drums (1, 7)
- Carlos Vega – drums (4, 6, 11)
- Scott Cutler – drum programming (9)
- Jeff Porcaro – drums (10)
- Paulinho da Costa – percussion (1, 5)
- Michael Fisher – percussion (3)
- Lenny Castro – percussion (4, 6, 11)
- David Boruff – saxophone (3, 9)
- Chuck Findley – trumpet solo (4)
- Peggi Blu – backing vocals (1)
- Siedah Garrett – backing vocals (1)
- Howard Hewett – backing vocals (1)
- Jennifer Holliday – backing vocals (1)
- James Ingram – backing vocals (1)
- Edie Lehman – backing vocals (1)
- Clif Magness – backing vocals (1)
- Luther Vandross – backing vocals (1)
- Dionne Warwick – backing vocals (1)
- Don Johnson – lead vocals (3), backing vocals (9)
- Lynn Davis – backing vocals (6)
- Denise De Caro – backing vocals (6)
- Phillip Ingram – backing vocals (6)
- Joe Pizzulo – backing vocals (6)
- Andrea Robinson – backing vocals (6)
- Howard Smith – backing vocals (6)

Music arrangements

- Glen Ballard – synthesizer arrangements (1)
- Jerry Hey – synthesizer arrangements (1)
- Quincy Jones – synthesizer arrangements (1)
- Clif Magness – synthesizer arrangements (1)
- Patrick Williams – string arrangements and conductor (2, 5, 8)
- Phil Ramone – arrangements (3)
- Randy Waldman – arrangements (3), rhythm arrangements (5, 9)
- Burt Bacharach – arrangements (4, 6, 11)
- Jeremy Lubbock – string arrangements and conductor (7, 10), synthesizer arrangements (10)
- Scott Cutler – rhythm arrangements (9)

== Production ==
- Quincy Jones – producer (1)
- Glen Ballard – associate producer (1)
- Clif Magness – associate producer (1)
- Barbra Streisand – producer (2, 7, 8, 10)
- Phil Ramone – producer (3, 5)
- Burt Bacharach – producer (4, 6, 11)
- Carole Bayer Sager – producer (4, 6, 11)
- Denny Diante – producer (7, 9, 10)
- Debbie Johnson – production assistant
- Susanne Marie Edgren – production coordinator
- Kim Skalecki – production coordinator
- Nancy Donald – art direction, design
- Tony Lane – art direction, design
- Randee St. Nicholas – photography

Technical credits

- Bernie Grundman – mastering at Bernie Grundman Mastering (Hollywood, California)
- Glen Ballard – tracking (1)
- Jerry Hey – tracking (1)
- Quincy Jones – tracking (1)
- Clif Magness – tracking (1)
- John Arrias – recording (1–3, 5, 7–10), mixing (2, 3, 5, 7, 8)
- Humberto Gatica – recording (1)
- Bruce Swedien – recording (1), mixing (1)
- Frank Wolf – recording (2, 5, 8–10), mixing (5)
- Mick Guzauski – recording (4, 6, 11), mixing (4, 6, 9–11)
- Jim Scott – recording (9)
- Bryant Arnett – assistant engineer
- Mike Bosley – assistant engineer
- Frank Dookun – assistant engineer
- Clark Germain – assistant engineer
- David Glover – assistant engineer
- Debbie Johnson – assistant engineer
- Laura Livingston – assistant engineer
- Richard McKernan – assistant engineer
- Marnie Riley – assistant engineer
- Joe Schiff – assistant engineer
- Stephen Shelton – assistant engineer
- Brad Sundberg – assistant engineer
- Gary Wagner – assistant engineer

== Charts ==
=== Weekly charts ===
Chart (1988–89)	Peak position
Australian Albums (ARIA)	21
Dutch Albums (Album Top 100)	5
European Albums (Music & Media)	39
Finnish Albums (Suomen virallinen lista)	9
French Albums (SNEP)	35
German Albums (Offizielle Top 100)	33
Norwegian Albums (VG-lista)	16
Spanish Albums Chart	19
Swedish Albums (Sverigetopplistan)	34
Swiss Albums (Schweizer Hitparade)	16
UK Albums (Official Charts)	29
US Billboard 200	10

== Certifications and sales ==
Region	Certification	Certified units/sales
Australia (ARIA)	Platinum	70,000^{^}
Canada (Music Canada)	Platinum	100,000^{^}
Netherlands (NVPI)	Gold	50,000^{^}
Switzerland (IFPI Switzerland)	Gold	25,000^{^}
United Kingdom (BPI)	Gold	100,000^{^}
United States (RIAA)	Platinum	1,000,000^{^}
^{^} Shipments figures based on certification alone.

Streisand's retrospective box set Just for the Record noted the album also received certification in New Zealand.
