= Not in Love at All =

Single by Barry Gibb

from the album Hawks
- Released: 1988 (promotional single)
- Recorded: February–March 1986; Middle Ear, Miami Beach
- Genre: Rock
- Length: 4:17
- Label: Polydor; Mercury (Brazil)
- Songwriters: Barry Gibb, Maurice Gibb, George Bitzer
- Producers: Barry Gibb, Karl Richardson

Barry Gibb singles chronology
"Childhood Days" (1988)	"Not in Love at All" (1988)	"Doctor Mann" (2006)

"Not in Love at All" is a song recorded by Barry Gibb that was included on his third solo album Moonlight Madness but was unreleased and included again on the soundtrack Hawks which was released in 1988 and later.

The song was released as a promo in Brazil by Mercury Records also that year. It was backed by Glenn Medeiros' "Long And Lasting Love".

It was written by Barry Gibb, Maurice Gibb and George Bitzer. Along with "My Eternal Love, this song was sung in falsetto. On his album Now Voyager (1984), Gibb had kept away from falsetto as if to declare his independence from the Bee Gees sound, but now he was willing to use it as one of his expressive voices.

The flipside, "Long and Lasting Love" by Medeiros, reached #68 in US, #42 in UK and #14 in Netherlands.
