= We're Not Makin' Love Anymore =

- Artwork for UK and European CD and vinyl releases

Single by Barbra Streisand

from the album A Collection: Greatest Hits...and More
- B-side: "Here We Are at Last"; "Till I Loved You"; "The Love Inside"; "No More Tears (Enough Is Enough)"
- Released: September 14, 1989
- Length: 5:33
- Label: Columbia
- Songwriters: Michael Bolton; Diane Warren
- Producers: Narada Michael Walden; Walter Afanasieff (asso.)

Barbra Streisand singles chronology
"What Were We Thinking Of" (1988)	"We're Not Makin' Love Anymore" (1989)	"Someone That I Used to Love" (1989)

"We're Not Makin' Love Anymore" is a song recorded by American singer Barbra Streisand for her fourth greatest hits album, A Collection: Greatest Hits...and More (1989). It was released on September 14, 1989 by Columbia Records on 7-inch, 12-inch, cassette, and CD. It was written by Michael Bolton and Diane Warren and produced by Narada Michael Walden. Bolton's inspiration for the song was derived from his divorce; he and Warren debated what singer would be able to sing their work well and ultimately decided that Streisand would be the right fit. The song is a ballad that is similar in sound to Streisand's "Comin' In and Out of Your Life" (1981).

Feedback for the song was mixed, with music critics questioning its inclusion on A Collection: Greatest Hits...and More and calling it unmemorable. Commercially, it entered the record charts in four countries, including Canada, the Netherlands, the United Kingdom, and the United States. On the Adult Contemporary chart in the lattermost country, it became a top ten hit while in the Netherlands, it was her lowest-performing single. An accompanying music video for the song was directed by Jim Shea and premiered on various television platforms in order to promote it.

Columbia Records CEO Tommy Mottola asked Bolton to perform the song live at the 1990 NARM Convention Bolton as a duet with new artist Mariah Carey to introduce her to the music industry audience. In 1991 Bolton and Patti LaBelle recorded it as duet for Bolton's album Time, Love & Tenderness, and LaBelle's studio album Burnin'.

== Background and release ==
In 1989, Streisand began serving as the director of the 1991 film adaptation of Pat Conroy's 1986 novel The Prince of Tides. Due to her investing the majority of her time to the film, Columbia Records and the singer decided that it would be best for her to release a new greatest hits album as she had been in a similar situation when she released her prior compilation, Memories (1981). While creating the new album, Streisand recorded two new tracks that were made specifically for the project: "We're Not Makin' Love Anymore" and "Someone That I Used to Love". The song was first released in the United States on September 14, 1989 by Columbia Records, while the album was released on October 3 of that same year.

The single was released in several formats during its physical release. The standard edition, available as both a 7-inch and a cassette single, features the song plus B-side track "Here We Are at Last". On the other formats, B-side tracks such as "Till I Loved You", "The Love Inside", and "No More Tears (Enough Is Enough)" were used. On select CD releases, "Kiss Me in the Rain", "The Places You Find Love", and "Wet" were included. In Spain, it was released as a sole A-side 7-inch single and the title was stylized as "We're Not Making Love Anymore".

== Writing and production ==
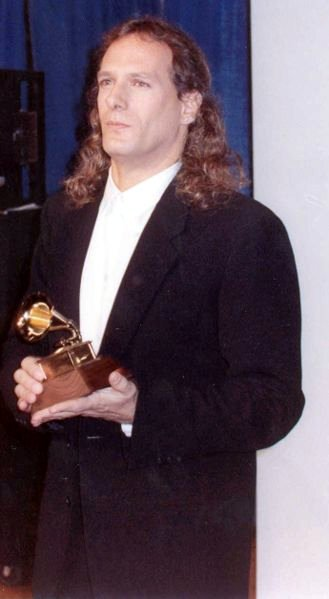
Michael Bolton (pictured in 1990) wrote the song with Diane Warren about his then-recent divorce.

"We're Not Makin' Love Anymore" was written by Michael Bolton and Diane Warren. According to Bolton in his 2013 memoir, The Soul of It All: My Music, My Life, he revealed that Warren and he completed writing the song at the Sunset Marquis Hotel in West Hollywood, California. To finish the track, Bolton had ordered keyboards to their guest room. The two then discussed singers they would send the song to in order to record it; they agreed that Streisand would ideally be the perfect choice due to her "rare combination of a Stradivarius-quality voice and a gift for storytelling in song". After offering the song to Streisand to record, Bolton remarked:

I had no doubt that Barbra would sing the hell out of 'We're Not Making Love Anymore' – and not just because she is one of the world's greatest singers. I began writing the song from the heart during my divorce, and Barbra sang it from heart in the studio. I was not at all shocked when her single immediately hit the Top 10 of the Adult Contemporary charts in 1989 [...] As much as that song means to me – I'm proud and thankful to have co-written it – I'll never be able to hear it without associating it with a sad time in my life.

Production of the track was handled by Narada Michael Walden and coordinated by Kim Skalecki. Bolton admitted that it was difficult for the song to be produced as Streisand "had protective and hard-to-please producers who screened all the material sent to her" before she had the chance to record it; however, after meeting with Streisand's friend and collaborator Jay Landers, it was finalized that Streisand would record it and release it as her next single. The singer recorded "We're Not Makin' Love Anymore" in 1989 and its mastering was finalized by Bernie Grundman in that same year.

Musically, the song is a "dramatic ballad" that has a duration of five minutes and 33 seconds. According to the official sheet music published by the Warner Music Group, the song is written in the key of D♭ major with a moderately slow beat consisting of 122 beats per minute. Its lyrics describe a couple who abruptly ended their relationship.

== Reception ==
According to Allison J. Waldman, author of The Barbra Streisand Scrapbook, the single was Streisand's "attempt at a big ballad" and considered it similar to her 1981 single "Comin' In and Out of Your Life"; however, she considered the latter song to be better. Furthermore, she liked that the new single was "emotional and strenuous", but she also considered it to be unmemorable. William Ruhlmann from AllMusic questioned the placement of "We're Not Makin' Love Anymore" and "Someone That I Used to Love" on A Collection: Greatest Hits...and More, stating that the overall track listing "made no apparent sense, but then neither had Memories, and that album sold several million copies". Bill Coleman from Billboard described it as a "emotive ballad" and stated that the song "is also her most accessible pop in some time. Flawless Walden production matched with Streisand's equally superb voice wins."

The single did not enter the Billboard Hot 100 in the United States, but it did reach the same publication's Adult Contemporary chart. It spent a total of thirteen weeks on the chart and peaked at number ten on November 4, 1989. On the equivalent record chart in Canada, compiled by RPM, it reached number 17 during its eleventh week charting. "We're Not Makin' Love Anymore" also entered the charts in two European countries: the Netherlands and the United Kingdom. In the former country, it peaked at number 89, becoming her lowest-charting single in that country; her follow-up single, "Someone That I Used to Love", would later become her second lowest-performing single. In the United Kingdom, it peaked at number 85.

== Promotion ==
A music video for "We're Not Makin' Love Anymore" was filmed and released to coincide with the physical distribution of the single on September 14, 1989. The visual was directed by Jim Shea and premiered on Entertainment Tonight and VH1 in order to promote the release of both the single and A Collection: Greatest Hits...and More. It was filmed in Los Angeles atop the roof of a building. In the video, Streisand stands near a window overlooking the stormy night. Overlapping scenes show Streisand singing into a studio microphone and a couple in a seemingly damaged relationship. Overall, it served as Streisand's first music video since the accompanying one for her 1985 single "Somewhere".

In 1991, Bolton and American singer Patti LaBelle released a cover of "We're Not Makin' Love Anymore" for the former's seventh studio album, Time, Love & Tenderness. Their version was described as "interesting" by the staff at Drum and considered by them to be "nothing like the original". Dennis Hunt from the Los Angeles Times said it was "some crowd-pleasing R&B" music, while Ebony's Lynn Norment praised Bolton's "soulful vocals" throughout their "sizzling duet".

== Credits and personnel ==
- Barbra Streisand – lead and background vocals
- Walter Afanasieff – associate producer, additional arrangements, keyboards, bass, drum programming, synthesizer
- Chris Camozzi – acoustic guitar
- Greg 'Gigi' Gonaway – Paiste cymbals, hi-hat
- Ren Klyce – Fairlight programming
- Narada Michael Walden – producer, arranger

== Track listings and formats ==
Standard edition 7-inch and cassette single

- A1 "We're Not Makin' Love Anymore" (Single Version) – 4:28
- B1 "Here We Are at Last" – 3:20

Promotional CD single

- 1. "We're Not Makin' Love Anymore" (Single Version) – 4:28
- 2. "We're Not Makin' Love Anymore" (Album Version) – 5:32

Europe CD maxi-single

- 1. "We're Not Makin' Love Anymore" (Album Version) – 5:33
- 2. "Here We Are at Last" – 3:20
- 3. "Till I Loved You" – 4:51

Europe CD single

- 1. "We're Not Makin' Love Anymore" (Single Version) – 4:32
- 2. "Here We Are at Last" – 3:18

Europe 4 track CD single

- 1. "We're Not Makin' Love Anymore" (Single Version) – 4:28
- 2. "Till I Loved You" – 5:08
- 3. "Kiss Me in the Rain" – 4:16
- 4. "The Places You Find Love" – 5:08

Japan CD single

- 1. "We're Not Makin' Love Anymore" (Album Version) – 5:33
- 2. "Here We Are at Last" – 3:20

Netherlands 12-inch single

- A1 "We're Not Makin' Love Anymore" (Album Version) – 5:33
- B1 "Here We Are at Last" – 3:20
- B2 "Till I Loved You" – 4:51

Spain 7-inch single

- A1 "We're Not Making Love Anymore" (Album Version) – 5:33

United Kingdom CD single

- 1. "We're Not Makin' Love Anymore" (Single Version) – 4:28
- 2. "Wet" – 5:08
- 3. "No More Tears (Enough Is Enough)" – 11:44

United Kingdom standard edition 12-inch single

- A1 "We're Not Makin' Love Anymore" (Album Version) – 5:20
- A2 "Here We Are at Last" – 3:20
- B1 "Till I Loved You" – 5:08
- B2 "The Love Inside" – 5:07

United Kingdom limited edition 12-inch single

- A1 "We're Not Makin' Love Anymore" (Single Version) – 4:28
- A2 "Wet" – 3:44
- B1 "No More Tears (Enough Is Enough)" – 11:44

== Charts ==
Chart (1989–1990)	Peak position
Canada Adult Contemporary (RPM)	17
Netherlands (Single Top 100)	89
UK Singles (Official Charts)	85
US Adult Contemporary (Billboard)	10
