= What Were We Thinking Of =

Single by Barbra Streisand

from the album Till I Loved You
- B-side: "Why Let It Go?"
- Released: February 1989
- Studio: B&J Studios
- Genre: Pop
- Length: 4:27
- Label: Columbia
- Songwriters: Antonina Armato; Scott Cutler
- Producer: Denny Diante

Barbra Streisand singles chronology
"All I Ask of You" (1988)	"What Were We Thinking Of" (1989)	"We're Not Makin' Love Anymore" (1989)

"What Were We Thinking Of" is a song recorded by American singer Barbra Streisand for her 25th studio album, Till I Loved You (1988). It was released as the album's third and final single in February 1989 by Columbia Records. The track was written by Antonina Armato and Scott Cutler and produced by Denny Diante. It features guest vocals from the singer's then-boyfriend Don Johnson, who had previously collaborated with Streisand on her 1988 single "Till I Loved You".

The physical release of "What Were We Thinking Of" includes the B-side track "Why Let It Go?", which is also featured on the parent album. A pop song, the track is about the end of a relationship that has soured over time. Critically, the song was well-received with several music critics calling it one of the best tracks on Till I Loved You. On Billboard's Adult Contemporary chart in the United States, "What Were We Thinking Of" peaked at number 32.

== Recording and release ==
"What Were We Thinking Of" was taken from Streisand's 25th studio album, Till I Loved You (1988). The song was written by Antonina Armato and Scott Cutler, and among the first ones to be penned by Armato. While recording songs for the album, Streisand's then-boyfriend Don Johnson, decided to serve as a featured artist on the album's title track, "Till I Loved You". The singer remarked that she enjoyed duetting with him because he is "very musical and has a unique sounding voice"; she was also interested in their collaborations due to the fact that he was able "act" out the lyrics while singing. Because of the success they had found while creating the aforementioned track, it was decided that Johnson would also lend his voice for background vocals on "What Were We Thinking Of". In order to return the favor to him, Streisand would later contribute guest vocals for his second studio album, Let It Roll (1989).

The track was released by Columbia Records in February 1989 as the final of the three singles from Till I Loved You. The standard 7" single and cassette single features B-side track "Why Let It Go?", which was taken from the parent album. A promotional version of the release, exclusive to the United States, used "What Were We Thinking Of" as both the A-side and B-side on the 7" record. In Spain, a single-sided format featuring just the album version of the song was also created.

== Lyrics and production ==
Like the majority of the songs on Till I Loved You, "What Were We Thinking Of" is a "nontheatrical pop song". According to the official sheet music published by the Warner Music Group, the song is written in the key of B major with a moderately fast beat consisting of 138 beats per minute. Since Till I Loved You is a concept album based on the beginnings and ends of relationships, "What Were We Thinking Of" was placed towards the end of the album's track listing where the accompanying songs' lyrics discuss break-ups and how to eventually move on from them. Lyrics from the track include: "Where did we go wrong? Is it really over? / Where does my heart belong if it's not with you?". To accompany the production, a number of instruments are present on the track, including a saxophone played by Dave Boruff, a guitar played by Michael Thompson, and drums played by Randy Waldman and Cutler.

== Reception ==
Responses from music critics suggested that "What Were We Thinking Of" was a standout track on Till I Loved You. Paul Grein, a writer for the Los Angeles Times, considered the song and "Some Good Things Never Last" as the two best cuts on side two of the parent album. Despite claiming that Streisand's album varied deeply in terms of quality, author Allison J. Waldman, who wrote The Barbra Streisand Scrapbook in 2001, listed the single in addition to album tracks "On My Way to You" and "Two People" as the three "especially fine cuts" included on Till I Loved You.

The single did not enter the Billboard Hot 100 in the United States, but did reach the same publication's Adult Contemporary chart. It spent a total of seven weeks on the chart and peaked at number 32 on May 13, 1989.

== Track listings ==
Standard 7" single and cassette

- A1 "What Were We Thinking Of" – 4:27
- B1 "Why Let It Go?" – 4:23

Spain 7" single

- A1 "What Were We Thinking Of" – 4:27

Promotional 7" single

- A1 "What Were We Thinking Of" – 4:27
- B1 "What Were We Thinking Of" – 4:27

== Charts ==
Chart (1989)	Peak position
US Adult Contemporary (Billboard)	32
