= Hawks (soundtrack) =

Soundtrack album by Barry Gibb
- Released: September 1988
- Recorded: 1985 (track 7); 1986 (except tracks 2, 6, and 7); February 1988 (tracks 2 and 6)
- Genres: Pop rock, new wave, synthpop, dance-pop, dance-rock, adult contemporary, soul
- Label: Polydor
- Producers: Barry Gibb, Karl Richardson (except tracks 2, 6); Barry Gibb, Maurice Gibb, Brian Tench (track 2 and 6)

Barry Gibb chronology
Now Voyager (1984)	Hawks (1988)	The Guilty Demos (2006)

Singles from Hawks
- 1. "Childhood Days" Released: August 1988; 2. "Not in Love at All" Released: 1988 (promo single)

Hawks is the soundtrack album for the film Hawks. All of the songs were performed by Barry Gibb (except the song "Chain Reaction", which was performed by Diana Ross).

== Release ==
All of the songs were written and recorded in 1986 by Barry for the unreleased Moonlight Madness album with the exception of "Childhood Days" and the instrumental "Celebration de la Vie". The songs "Where Tomorrow Is", "Not in Love at All" and "Letting Go" were not in the film and were noted on the CD as bonus track not featured in the film, Additionally these recordings of "Moonlight Madness", "Cover You" and "Celebration de la Vie" are not in the film either, but appear instead as instrumental versions.

The lead single "Childhood Days" was released in the UK but did not chart; it reached number 60 in Germany. "Not in Love at All" was included on a Brazilian promotional maxi-single on Mercury Records.

== Track listing ==
No.	Title	Writer(s)	Length
1.	"System of Love"	Barry Gibb, Alan Kendall	3:57
2.	"Childhood Days"	Barry Gibb, Maurice Gibb	3:33
3.	"Moonlight Madness"	Barry Gibb, George Bitzer, Alan Kendall	5:12
4.	"My Eternal Love"	Barry Gibb, Richard Powers	4:30
5.	"Where Tomorrow Is"	Barry Gibb, Robin Gibb, Maurice Gibb	4:14
6.	"Celebration de la Vie"	Barry Gibb, Robin Gibb, Maurice Gibb	3:33
7.	"Chain Reaction" (performed by Diana Ross)	Barry Gibb, Robin Gibb, Maurice Gibb	3:47
8.	"Cover You"	Barry Gibb, Karl Richardson	4:46
9.	"Not in Love at All"	Barry Gibb, Maurice Gibb, George Bitzer	4:17
10.	"Letting Go"	Barry Gibb, George Bitzer	3:38
