= Come Tomorrow (Barbra Streisand and Barry Gibb song) =

Single by Barbra Streisand and Barry Gibb

from the album Guilty Pleasures
- Released: December 19, 2005
- Studio: Hit Factory Criteria (Miami, FL)
- Length: 5:01
- Label: Columbia
- Songwriter(s): Ashley Gibb; Barry Gibb; Stephen Gibb
- Producer(s): Barry Gibb; John Merchant

Barbra Streisand singles chronology
"Night of My Life" (2005)	"Come Tomorrow" (2005)	"In the Wee Small Hours of the Morning" (2009)

Barry Gibb singles chronology
"Childhood Days" (1988)	"Come Tomorrow" (2005)	"Doctor Mann" (2006)

"Come Tomorrow" is a song recorded by American singer Barbra Streisand for her 31st studio album, Guilty Pleasures (2005). The track was written by Ashley Gibb, Barry Gibb and Stephen Gibb while production was handled by Barry Gibb and John Merchant.

Commercially, "Come Tomorrow" entered the charts in Scotland and the United Kingdom and peaked at numbers 57 and 95, respectively.

== Background ==
"Come Tomorrow" was written by Ashley Gibb, Barry Gibb and Stephen Gibb while production was handled by Barry Gibb and John Merchant. The track includes backing vocals from singers Beth Cohen and Leesa Richards, in addition to featured artist Barry Gibbs, who backed for Streisand on each of the album's 12 songs.

== Track listing ==
CD single
No.	Title	Length
1.	"Come Tomorrow"	5:01
2.	"Night of My Life" (Love to Infinity Master Mix)	6:43

== Charts ==
Chart (2005)	Peak position
Scotland (OCC)	57
UK Singles (Official Charts Company)	95
