= What Kind of Fool =

Single by Barbra Streisand and Barry Gibb

from the album Guilty
- B-side: "The Love Inside" (US); "Make It Like A Memory" (UK)
- Released: January 1981
- Recorded: February 1980
- Studio: Middle Ear (Miami)
- Genre: R&B
- Length: 4:06
- Label: Columbia Records (US); CBS Records (UK)
- Songwriter(s): Barry Gibb; Albhy Galuten
- Producer(s): Gibb-Galuten-Richardson

Barbra Streisand singles chronology
"Guilty" (1980)	"What Kind of Fool" (1981)	"Promises" (1981)

Barry Gibb singles chronology
"Guilty" (1980)	"What Kind of Fool" (1981)	"Shine, Shine" (1984)

Audio
- "What Kind of Fool" on YouTube

"What Kind of Fool" is a 1981 vocal duet by singers Barbra Streisand and Barry Gibb. The song was written by Gibb and Albhy Galuten. Released as the third single from Streisand's album Guilty (1980), "What Kind of Fool" was the third consecutive top ten single from the album in the United States. "Woman in Love" reached number one on the Billboard Hot 100 chart, and the album's title track (also a duet between the two singers) reached number three, both in late 1980. "What Kind of Fool" spent three weeks at number ten on the Hot 100 in March and April 1981. It also spent four weeks atop the Billboard adult contemporary chart.

== Background ==
The songs on the Guilty album were a collaboration between Streisand and all the members of the Bee Gees, including Barry's brothers, Robin and Maurice Gibb. But Barry Gibb played the largest role of the brothers on the album, co-writing and co-producing all of the tracks, appearing on the album cover embracing Streisand, and singing two duets with her. Co-producer Karl Richardson was quoted describing Barry Gibb's contribution to this song: "He did the demo first. Barbra sang to the demo, then he came back and replaced a couple of things after he had heard what she was doing."

== Personnel ==
- Barbra Streisand – lead vocals
- Barry Gibb – lead and backing vocals, acoustic guitar
- Pete Carr – guitar
- George Bitzer – Grand piano
- Richard Tee – electric piano
- Harold Cowart – bass guitar
- Steve Gadd – drums
- Bernard Lupe – drums
- Peter Graves – trombone
- Ken Faulk – trumpet

== Charts ==
Chart (1981)	Peak position
U.S. Billboard Adult Contemporary	1
U.S. Billboard Hot 100	10

Year-end chart (1981)	Rank
US Top Pop Singles (Billboard)	85

== Glee version ==
Popular American television series Glee covered this song in 2011 with fictional character Blaine Anderson (as played by Darren Criss). This was featured on their soundtrack album Glee: The Music Presents the Warblers. No episode of the series had featured this version, as it only appeared in the album.
