= Guilty (Barbra Streisand album) =

1980 studio album by Barbra Streisand

Studio album by Barbra Streisand
- Released: September 23, 1980
- Recorded: February – March and June 1980
- Studios: Criteria, Miami; Middle Ear, Miami; Sound Labs, Hollywood; Digital Magnetics, Hollywood; Mediasound, New York City
- Genres: Pop; soft rock; post-disco; adult contemporary
- Length: 41:41
- Label: Columbia
- Producers: Barry Gibb; Albhy Galuten; Karl Richardson

Barbra Streisand chronology
Wet (1979)	Guilty (1980)	Memories (1981)

Singles from Guilty
- 1. "Woman in Love" Released: August 1980; 2. "Guilty" Released: October 1980; 3. "What Kind of Fool" Released: January 1981; 4. "Promises" Released: May 1981

Guilty is the twenty-second studio album by American singer Barbra Streisand released on September 23, 1980, by Columbia Records. It was produced by Barry Gibb of the Bee Gees and his group's regular production team of Albhy Galuten and Karl Richardson.

Streisand released a sequel to this album, Guilty Pleasures, in 2005, also produced and largely written by Gibb. Both albums are considered partial-collaborations, since Gibb not only performed two duets with Streisand, but is also heard on background vocals on most songs. They also appear together on both album covers. The album sold over 15 million copies worldwide.

== Background and production ==
After the huge success of the Bee Gees in the late 1970s, Gibb began to focus on writing and producing songs. Streisand approached Gibb to write songs for her new album—initially he was going to write or co-write only half the album, but the process went so well he ended up doing the entire album. All the songs were written expressly for Streisand except "The Love Inside", which Gibb wrote over a year before.

Two songs ("Secrets" and "Carried Away") were written for the album but not used. Both appear on The Guilty Demos, which features Gibb singing the songs he wrote for Streisand. The outtake songs would later be recorded and released by Elaine Paige and Olivia Newton-John respectively.

== Singles ==
The lead single "Woman in Love" became one of the most successful songs of Streisand's music career and spent a total of three weeks at number one on the Billboard Hot 100 chart. Two other singles were released, which also peaked within the top ten on Billboard Hot 100: the title track, a duet between Streisand and Gibb, won the Grammy Award for Best Pop Performance by a Duo or Group with Vocal in 1981, released as a second single for the album, and became an instant hit, peaking at number three, and "What Kind of Fool", another duet with Gibb, reached number ten for three weeks. The fourth single, "Promises", a more disco-oriented track released in May 1981, reached as high as number 48 in both the U.S. and Canada. It was a much bigger Adult Contemporary hit in both nations, reaching number eight and number five, respectively. This song was also released on Streisand's first commercially released 12" single as a solo artist following her 1979 duet with Donna Summer, "No More Tears (Enough Is Enough)", and two promotional singles released for "Shake Me, Wake Me (When It's Over)" in 1975, and "The Main Event/Fight" in 1979.

== Critical reception ==
Professional ratings
Review scores
Source	Rating
AllMusic	4.5/5 stars
Robert Christgau	C+
The Rolling Stone Album Guide	5/5 stars

The album received favorable reviews from music critics. William Ruhlmann from AllMusic wrote that the album is one of the singer's "least characteristic" albums and that "it sounds like a post-Saturday Night Fever Bee Gees album with vocals by Streisand." Robert Christgau gave the album a C+ and criticized Streisand's vocals ("most of the time she oversings") and that "when she dramatizes a soap like "Life Story," the mismatch is ridiculous". Stephen Holden from Rolling Stone gave the album a favorable review and wrote that "while Guilty is a romantic entertainment with no ambitions beyond making billions of hearts flutter and earning millions of dollars, it's also as beautifully crafted a piece of ear candy as I've heard in years". He also wrote that "Barbra Streisand and Barry Gibb's album may not be particularly nutritious, but it sure is tasty."

== Commercial performance ==
Guilty became Streisand's best-selling album to date internationally, with sales of 15 million copies worldwide as well as spawning several hit singles. According to the liner notes of Streisand's 1991 retrospective box set Just for the Record, the album also received a record certification in Austria, Brazil, Denmark, Israel, Japan, the Netherlands, Portugal, Spain. Sweden, Switzerland, and Russia.

== Re-release ==
Guilty was re-released on DualDisc on 30 August 2005 by Sony Legacy Recordings in advance of its sequel project, Guilty Pleasures and also commemorated its 25th anniversary. The re-release featured remastered audio, new interviews with Streisand and Gibb, two live performances from 1986 and a photo gallery of the original photo session for Guilty by Mario Casilli.

== Track listing ==
Side one
No.	Title	Writer(s)	Length
1.	"Guilty" (with Barry Gibb)	Barry Gibb; Maurice Gibb; Robin Gibb	4:23
2.	"Woman in Love"	B. Gibb; R. Gibb	3:49
3.	"Run Wild"	B. Gibb; R. Gibb	4:06
4.	"Promises"	B. Gibb; R. Gibb	4:20
5.	"The Love Inside"	B. Gibb	5:08

Side two
No.	Title	Writer(s)	Length
6.	"What Kind of Fool" (with Barry Gibb)	B. Gibb; Albhy Galuten	4:06
7.	"Life Story"	B. Gibb; R. Gibb	4:38
8.	"Never Give Up"	B. Gibb; Galuten	3:44
9.	"Make It Like a Memory"	B. Gibb; Galuten	7:28
Total length:			41:41

== Credits ==
Personnel

- Barbra Streisand – lead vocals
- George Bitzer – grand piano (1, 4, 6, 7), electric piano (1), synthesizers (5, 7, 8)
- Richard Tee – electric piano (1–3, 5, 6, 8), grand piano (2, 9), clavinet (8)
- Albhy Galuten – synthesizers (4–7)
- Barry Gibb – acoustic guitar (1–3, 5–7), backing vocals (1, 3, 4, 6–8), lead vocals (1, 6)
- Cornell Dupree – guitars (1, 8, 9)
- George Terry – guitars (1, 5, 8, 9), slide guitar (3), gut-string guitar (9)
- Pete Carr – guitars (2, 6, 9), acoustic guitar (6)
- Lee Ritenour – guitars (4, 7)
- Harold Cowart – bass (1–4, 6, 8, 9)
- David Hungate – bass (7)
- Steve Gadd – drums (1–4, 6, 8, 9)
- Bernard Lupe – drums (2, 6, 7)
- Dennis Bryon – drums (7)
- Joe Lala – percussion (1, 2, 4, 7, 9)
- Jerry Peel – French horn (2, 3)
- Whit Sidener – baritone saxophone (4, 9)
- Dan Bonsanti – tenor saxophone (4, 9)
- Neal Bonsanti – tenor saxophone (4, 9)
- Peter Graves – trombone (4, 6, 7, 9)
- Russ Freeland – trombone (6, 7)
- Mike Katz – trombone (6, 7)
- Ken Faulk – trumpet (4, 6, 7, 9)
- Brett Murphy – trumpet (4, 6, 7, 9)
- Gene Orloff – string contractor
- Myrna Matthews – backing vocals (2, 5)
- Denise (Maynelli) DeCaro – backing vocals (2, 5), vocal contractor (2, 5)
- Marti McCall – backing vocals (2, 5)

Music arrangements

- Albhy Galuten – horn and string arrangements
- Barry Gibb – horn and string arrangements
- Peter Graves – horn arrangements

Production

- Charles Koppelman – executive producer
- Barry Gibb – producer
- Albhy Galuten – producer
- Karl Richardson – producer, engineer, mixing
- Don Gehman – engineer, mixing
- Carl Beatty – assistant engineer
- Michael Guerra – assistant engineer
- Dennis Hertzendorfer – assistant engineer
- Dale Peterson – assistant engineer
- Sam Taylor – assistant engineer
- Robert Shames – assistant engineer
- Patrick Von Wiegandt – assistant engineer
- Bob Carbone – mastering at A&M Mastering Studios (Hollywood, California)
- Linda Garrity – production coordinator
- Nan Leone – studio coordinator
- Tony Lane – visual coordinator
- Mario Casilli – photography

== Accolades ==
American Music Awards

Year	Recipient	Award (with notes)	Result
1981	Barbra Streisand	Favorite Pop/Rock Female Artist (for her album Guilty)	Won

Grammy Awards

Year	Recipient (with notes)	Award	Result
1981	Guilty	Album of the Year	Nominated
1981	"Woman in Love" (written by Barry Gibb and Robin Gibb)	Best Pop Vocal Performance - Female	Nominated
1981	"Woman in Love" (written by Barry Gibb and Robin Gibb)	Record of the Year	Nominated
1981	"Woman in Love" (written by Barry Gibb and Robin Gibb)	Song of the Year	Nominated
1981	"Guilty" (Duet with Barry Gibb)	Best Pop Vocal Performance - Duo or Group	Won

National Association of Recording Merchandisers (NARM)

Year	Recipient	Award	Result
1981	Guilty	Best Selling LP by a Female Vocalist	Honored

== Charts ==
=== Weekly charts ===
Initial weekly chart performance for Guilty
Chart (1980–1981)	Peak position
Australian Albums (Kent Music Report)	1
Austrian Albums (Ö3 Austria)	1
Canada Top Albums/CDs (RPM)	3
Dutch Albums (Album Top 100)	1
Finnish Albums (Suomen virallinen lista)	1
French Albums (IFOP)	1
German Albums (Offizielle Top 100)	4
Italian Albums (Billboard)	1
Italian Albums (Musica e dischi)	1
Japanese Albums (Oricon)	9
New Zealand Albums (RMNZ)	1
Norwegian Albums (VG-lista)	1
Spanish Albums (AFE)	1
Swedish Albums (Sverigetopplistan)	1
UK Albums (Official Charts)	1
US Billboard 200	1
US Top 100 Albums (Cash Box)	1
US The Album Chart (Record World)	1

1990s weekly chart performance for Guilty
Chart (1992)	Peak position
Dutch Albums (Album Top 100)	26

2000s weekly chart performance for Guilty
Chart (2005)	Peak position
Dutch Albums (Album Top 100)	91
UK Albums (Official Charts)	93

2010s weekly chart performance for Guilty
Chart (2015)	Peak position
Scottish Albums (Official Charts)	46
UK Albums (Official Charts)	64
UK Album Downloads (Official Charts)	26

=== Year-end charts ===
1980 year-end chart chart performance for Guilty
Chart (1980)	Position
Australian Albums (Kent Music Report)	22
Canada Top Albums/CDs (RPM)	39
New Zealand Albums (RMNZ)	11
UK Albums (OCC)	9
US Top 100 Albums (Cash Box)	17
US The Album Chart (Record World)	8
US Top Solo LP Chart (Record World)	4

1981 year-end chart chart performance for Guilty
Chart (1981)	Position
Australian Albums (Kent Music Report)	28
Austrian Albums (Ö3 Austria)	8
Canada Top Albums/CDs (RPM)	39
German Albums (Offizielle Top 100)	21
Japanese Albums (Oricon)	52
New Zealand Albums (RMNZ)	43
UK Albums (OCC)	26
US Billboard 200	12
US Top 100 Albums (Cash Box)	15
US The Album Chart (Record World)	14
US Top Solo Artist Album (Record World)	5

== Certifications and sales ==
Region	Certification	Certified units/sales
Australia (ARIA)	6× Platinum	420,000^{^}
Austria	—	50,000
Belgium (BRMA)	2× Platinum	250,000
Canada (Music Canada)	5× Platinum	500,000^{^}
Finland (Musiikkituottajat)	Platinum	57,106
France (SNEP)	2× Platinum	600,000^{*}
Germany (BVMI)	Platinum	500,000^{^}
Hong Kong (IFPI Hong Kong)	Platinum	20,000^{*}
Italy (FIMI)	Platinum	400,000
Japan	—	138,530
Netherlands (NVPI)	3× Platinum	300,000^{^}
New Zealand (RMNZ)	Platinum	15,000^{^}
Norway (IFPI Norway)	Platinum	50,000^{*}
Portugal (AFP)	Silver	10,000^{^}
Sweden (GLF)	Gold	50,000^{^}
United Kingdom (BPI)	Platinum	750,000
United States (RIAA)	5× Platinum	5,000,000^{^}
Yugoslavia	—	11,190
Summaries
Worldwide	—	15,000,000
^{*} Sales figures based on certification alone.^{^} Shipments figures based on certification alone.

== References in popular culture ==
In October 2010, American DJ duo Duck Sauce released a single titled "Barbra Streisand", the cover of which is modeled directly after Guilty. Neither the song nor the artist are associated in any way with Barbra Streisand.

== The Guilty Demos ==
The Guilty Demos

Demo album by Barry Gibb
- Released: October 10, 2006
- Recorded: October 1979
- Studio: Criteria (Miami)
- Genre: Soft rock
- Length: 44:39
- Producer: Barry Gibb

Barry Gibb albums chronology
Hawks (1988)	The Guilty Demos (2006)	The Heartbreaker Demos (2006)

The Guilty Demos is a demo version of the album by Barry Gibb. Not intended for release tapes of these had been circulating among fans before bootleg CDs started emerging. In October 2006 Gibb made these available through iTunes. Recorded in 1979 all of the songs were written that same year except "The Love Inside" which was written in 1978 during work on Spirits Having Flown.

All songs feature Barry Gibb's falsetto voice, except "What Kind of Fool" where he used his natural voice. The songs "Carried Away" and "Secrets" were not used by Streisand but instead recorded by Elaine Paige with only "Secrets" being issued on her 1981 self-titled album. Olivia Newton-John recorded and released "Carried Away" on her Physical album, also in 1981. The demo version of "Never Give Up" remains unreleased.

=== Track listing ===
No.	Title	Writer(s)	Length
1.	"Guilty"	Barry Gibb; Maurice Gibb; Robin Gibb	4:03
2.	"Woman in Love"	B. Gibb; R. Gibb	3:53
3.	"Run Wild"	B. Gibb; R. Gibb	4:23
4.	"Promises"	B. Gibb; R. Gibb	4:15
5.	"The Love Inside"	B. Gibb	4:47
6.	"What Kind of Fool"	B. Gibb; Albhy Galuten	4:05
7.	"Life Story"	B. Gibb; R. Gibb	4:57
8.	"Make It Like A Memory"	B. Gibb; A. Galuten	6:34
9.	"Carried Away"	B. Gibb; A. Galuten	3:52
10.	"Secrets"	B. Gibb; R. Gibb	3:50

=== Personnel ===
- Barry Gibb - vocals, guitar
- Albhy Galuten - synthesizer, drum machine
- Blue Weaver - keyboard

== See also ==
- List of best-selling albums by women
