= Ray Burton (musician) =

Australian musician, singer and songwriter

- Born: Raymond Charles Burton; 1945 (age 80–81); Sydney, New South Wales, Australia
- Genres: Rock and roll; pop; progressive rock; jazz fusion
- Occupations: Musician; singer-song writer
- Instruments: Vocals; guitar
- Years active: 1961–present
- Label: Warner
- Website: rayburtonmusic.com

Raymond Charles Burton (born 1945) is an Australian musician and singer-song writer. He was briefly a member of rock 'n' rollers the Delltones (1965–66) on vocals, pop group the Executives (1968–69) on guitar and vocals, progressive rockers Leo de Castro and Friends (1973) on guitar, and jazz fusion band Ayers Rock (1973–74) on guitar and vocals. In 1971, Burton was working in the United States where he co-wrote "I Am Woman" with fellow Australian Helen Reddy, which became a number-one hit for her on the Billboard Hot 100 late in the following year. Another song written by the pair, "Best Friend", was sung by Reddy while she was also acting in a disaster film, Airport 1975 (October 1974). As a solo artist, Burton issued an album, Dreamers and Nightflyers, and two associated singles, "Too Hard to Handle" and "Paddington Green", in 1978 in Australia. He returned to the US, where he worked as a song writer.

== Biography ==
Ray Burton was born in 1945. He joined Dave Bridge Quartet as a rhythm guitarist in 1961 in Sydney. The instrumental band included Bridge (ex-Col Joye and the Joy Boys) on lead guitar, Warren Foley on drums and Ken White on bass guitar. They were signed to His Master's Voice which issued two singles, "Skip to My Lou" (1961) and "San Fernando Valley" (1962) before disbanding early in the next year. Burton on lead guitar formed his own instrumental group, the Telstars, and issued a single, "Reef Ride" (December 1963). He joined vocal harmony, rock 'n' roll group, the Delltones, for a year from 1965 to 1966.

In 1967 Burton (under the name Raymond Doughty) was enlisted by pop group, the Executives, on lead guitar. According to Australian musicologist, Ian McFarlane, they had, "scored a run of hit singles" in Sydney with "My Aim Is to Please You'" (June 1967), "Sit Down I Think I Love You" (August), "It's a Happening World" (March 1968), "Windy Day" (June) and "Summerhill Road" (December). The group toured the United States in 1968 and again in the following year (under the name Inner Sense), McFarlane observed, "by that stage, however, [their] breezy pop had become outmoded in the face of rock's new progressive phase and the band quietly folded." Most of the members returned to Australia.

While in the US Inner Sense had worked with the talent management company, DiBlasio, Wald & Day, in Los Angeles, which led to Burton collaborating with fellow Australian, Helen Reddy (her then-husband and manager was Jeff Wald), in early 1971. Two of their co-written tracks, "I Am Woman" and "Best Friend", appeared on her debut album, I Don't Know How to Love Him (May 1971). Burton's work permit had expired and he returned to Australia. By December 1972 "I Am Woman" had become a number-one hit on the Billboard Hot 100. In February of the following year it peaked at No. 2 on the Go-Set Australian National Charts top 40.

Burton travelled to Melbourne where he joined funk, soul and country music group, Leo de Castro and Friends, in April 1973 on guitar, alongside de Castro on lead vocals, Mark Kennedy on drums and Duncan McGuire on bass guitar. Burton McGuire & Kennedy formed their own eponymous group in June and added Jimmy Doyle (ex-the Delltones, Dig Richards) on guitar in August. In September they were renamed, Ayers Rock, as a jazz fusion, progressive rock group and in the next month, Col Loughnan joined on saxophones. Burton left the group in March 1974 and travelled to the US, "to push his claim for unpaid royalties due from the sales of 'I Am Woman'."

In the US he worked as a session musician for Billy Joel, Dave Mason and Jimmy Webb. He returned to Australia in 1977 where he formed a rock group, the Nightflyers, with Rex Bullen on keyboards (ex-Bakery, Jim Keays' Southern Cross), Ian Davidson on guitar and synthesiser, Gus Fenwick on bass guitar (ex-Pleazers, Band of Talabene, Healing Force), Steve Hopes on drums and John Pugh on guitar (ex-Eighteenth Century Quartet, Cam-Pact, James Taylor Move, Healing Force). They recorded his debut solo album, Dreamers and Nightflyers, and two associated singles, "Too Hard to Handle" and "Paddington Green", in 1978, which was produced by Charles Fisher via Warner Records. He returned to the US where he worked as a song writer. As of June 2003 Burton was living in Queensland's Gold Coast, where he would occasionally perform at local venues.

== Discography ==
=== Studio albums ===
Title	Album details
Strive, Seek, Find (with Gino Cunico as Burton & Cunico)	Released: 1971; Format: LP; Label: Family Productions (PAS 6013)
Dreamers and Nightflyers	Released: 1978; Format: LP; Label: Warner Bros. Records (600 036)

=== Singles ===
List of singles, with selected chart positions
Year	Title	Peak chart positions	Album
Year	Title	AUS	Album
1971	"Grandfathers" (as Burton & Cunico)	-	Strive, Seek, Find
1977	"Too Hard To Handle "	50	Dreamers and Nightflyers
1978	"Paddington Green"	97	Dreamers and Nightflyers
