= Ayers Rock (band) =

Australian rock band (1973–1981)

- Ayers Rock performing in April 1975. From left to right: Chris Brown, Duncan McGuire, Mark Kennedy, Jimmy Doyle, and Col Loughnan

Background information
- Also known as: Burton McGuire & Kennedy
- Origin: Melbourne, Victoria, Australia
- Genres: Jazz fusion; progressive rock
- Years active: 1973–1981
- Labels: Mushroom; Festival; A&M; RCA; Red Rock
- Past members: Ray Burton; Mark Kennedy; Duncan McGuire; Jimmy Doyle; Col Loughnan; Phil Stone; Chris Brown; Les Young; Doug Gallacher; Russell Dunlop; Joe Tattersall; Keith Caisey; John Young; Andy Cowan; Steve Hogg; Hamish Stuart

Ayers Rock were an Australian rock band which formed in August 1973 whenRay Burton (guitar and vocals), Mark Kennedy (drums), and Duncan McGuire (bass), then members of Leo de Castro and Friends, left to form the eponymous trio of Burton, McGuire & Kennedy. They added a guitarist, Jimmy Doyle, changed their name to Ayers Rock and invited Col Loughnan (saxophones and flutes) to join. The group signed with independent label Mushroom Records in December 1973. Burton left the following March, and he was replaced by Chris Brown (guitar, vocals). With live appearances, coverage in print media and word of mouth, the group had a high national profile despite little radio airplay, and journalists praised their musicianship, music, and live energy.

The band's first album, Big Red Rock (November 1974), was recorded live in the studio before a small audience of friends and lovers. It received positive reviews and peaked at number 32 on the Australian Kent Music Report album chart. It featured mainstream rock and three longer, instrumental tracks which introduced progressive styles, including jazz fusion. Label owner Michael Gudinski promoted Ayers Rock in Los Angeles, and they signed with A&M Records, the first Mushroom Records artists to sign with an international label. The United States release of Big Red Rock in February 1975 was followed by a tour there, later that year. The band played to large crowds, supporting major international artists (including Bachman–Turner Overdrive) before 35,000 people – the first Australian band to perform in large US stadiums. Ayers Rock were named 1975 Musicians of the Year on RAM's "New Year's Honors List". Kennedy and McGuire left before their second album, Beyond (April 1976, recorded at the Record Plant in Los Angeles), was released. The album blended a number of music genres and had a positive critical reception, charting at number 50. The band toured the US again; Loughnan remained there, and Ayers Rock temporarily broke up in August 1976.

A year later, Doyle and Brown recruited members for a new lineup, including Andy Cowan (keyboards and vocals) and Hamish Stuart (drums). In 1980, they released their third album, Hotspell, on their own Red Rock Records label. This album had a soft-rock, funk style, with sophisticated arrangements and featured keyboards. It failed to chart, and the group permanently disbanded in 1981. Although Ayers Rock's first two albums were successful in Australia, none of their six singles charted. During their early years (from 1973 to 1976), the group were praised by local media for their music, stylistic diversity, use of technology, and the energy of their live performances. Ayers Rock received positive reviews in Billboard and Cashbox. Late-1990s music historians recognised the band's talent but considered their music over-indulgent at times, failing to bridge the gap between artistic and commercial success. Duncan Kimball of Milesago.com wrote "that they never really got the chance to reach their full potential." Kennedy and McGuire later joined Doug Parkinson’s Southern Star Band.

== Australian music scene ==
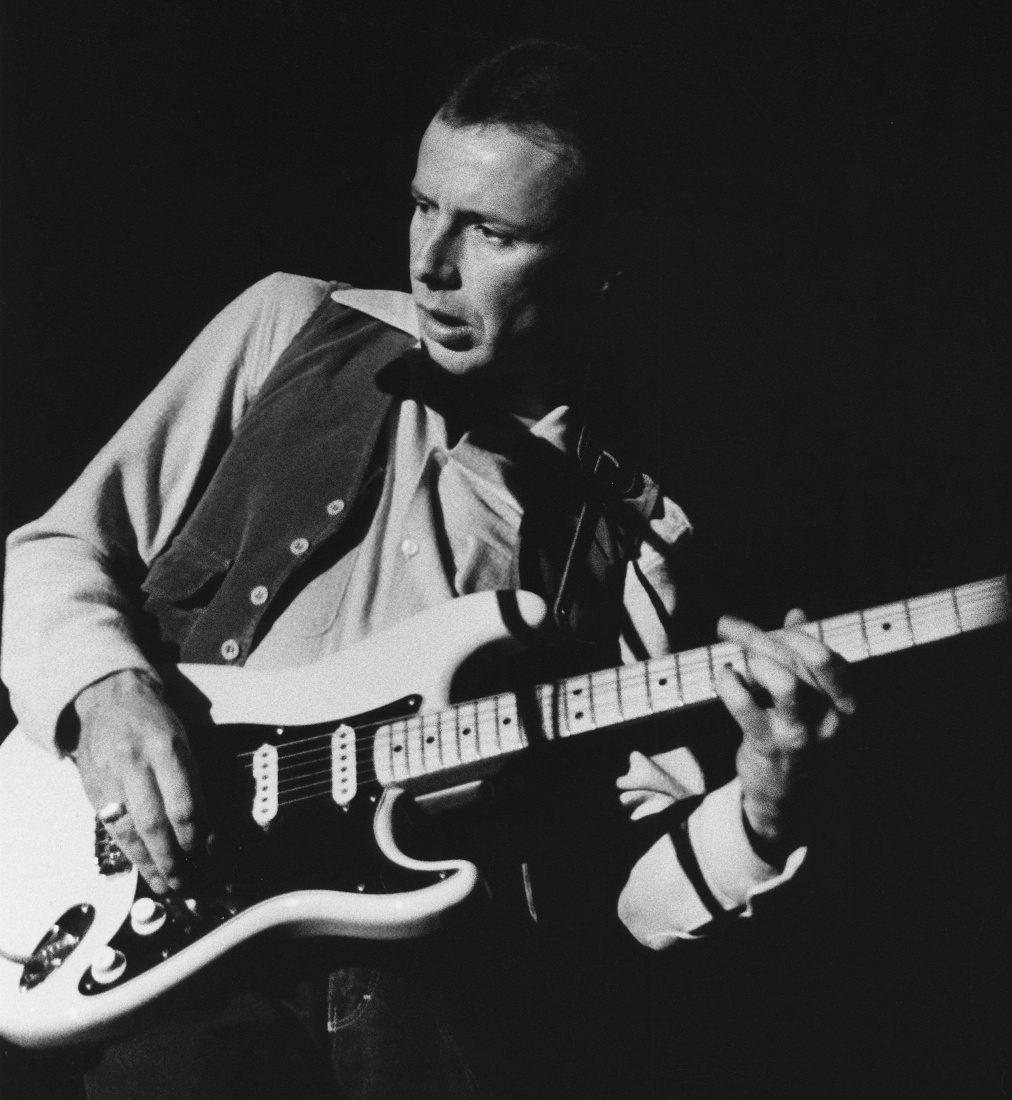
Jimmy Doyle founding mainstay guitarist of Ayers Rock, 1981.

Ayers Rock were formed in the Australian pop-music scene of the early 1970s, which included artists in a number of genres: mainstream pop (Zoot and Liv Maessen), blues rock (Chain), heavy rock (Billy Thorpe & the Aztecs), and boogie (Carson). Bands such as Blackfeather and Madder Lake combined mainstream and progressive rock. Most pop and rock listeners had never heard jazz fusion; when Ayers Rock incorporated the music into their sets, it was rarely performed by fellow Australian artists.

At that time, the Australian music media expressed frustration that few local musicians were successful overseas. Many artists (such as The Twilights, The Masters Apprentices, The Groop and Axiom) had gone to the United Kingdom with little commercial success, and music papers such as Go-Set regularly addressed the situation. The "third wave" of Australian rock, from 1970 to 1975, saw an increase in pub rock venues in the southern and eastern states.

== History ==
=== 1973: Formation ===
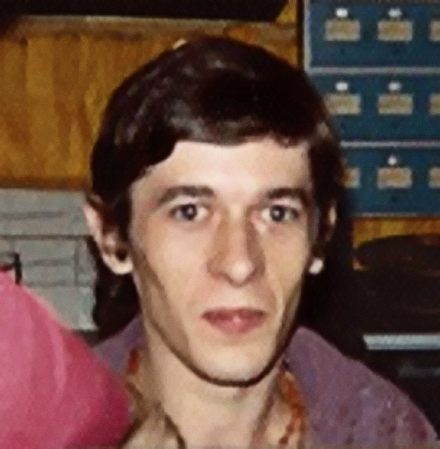
Mark Kennedy of Ayers Rock (1973–76), during a recording session at the Record Plant, L.A., in September 1975.

Ayers Rock formed in Melbourne in August 1973. Ray Burton, Mark Kennedy, and Duncan McGuire, members of Leo de Castro and Friends, left in June to form the eponymous trio of Burton McGuire & Kennedy. Burton had played guitar with the Dave Bridge Quartet, the Delltones and the Executives, and co-wrote "I Am Woman" (May 1972) in the United States with Australian singer Helen Reddy. McGuire, on bass, was a recording engineer, producer, and a member of Australian groups since the late 1950s (including the Phantoms, the Epics, the Questions – which later became Doug Parkinson in Focus; see Doug Parkinson – and King Harvest). Kennedy, on drums, had played in Spectrum, Doug Parkinson in Focus, King Harvest, and Leo de Castro and Friends.

Burton McGuire & Kennedy were joined in August 1973 by Jimmy Doyle on guitar. Doyle had worked for the Delltones and Dig Richards, was musical director for pianist Winifred Atwell on her Australian tours, and was a session player in Sydney on Neil Sedaka's 1969 album Workin' on a Groovy Thing. In September 1973 Burton McGuire & Kennedy changed their name to Ayers Rock, using the European name for the sandstone rock formation sacred to local indigenous Australians. The group were nicknamed "the Rock" by the Australian press. Since 1993 the sandstone monolith has been called by its Pitjantjatjaran name, Uluru.

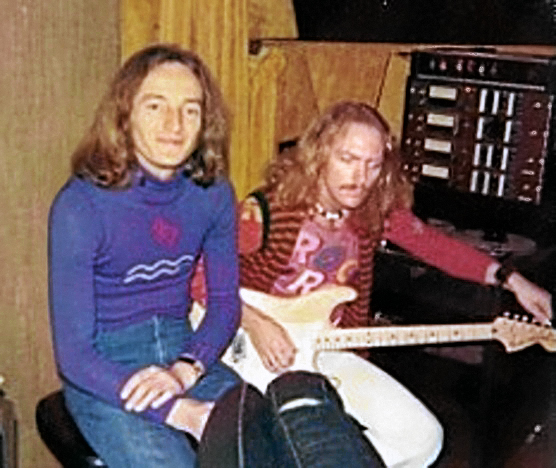
Duncan McGuire (left) and Chris Brown at the Record Plant, L.A. in September 1975.

Doyle had worked sporadically for several years with multi-instrumentalist and arranger Col Loughnan, (Note: Various sources misspell Colin Loughnan's surname: Greg Borschmann has "Loughan", Tony Catterall has "Loughlan", and Vernon Joynson has "Loughman".) who joined London-based blues-pop group Kala in late 1972. Doyle invited his former bandmate to join in October 1973. With Ayers Rock, Loughnan played saxophones, flute, and electric piano. He had begun his career as lead vocalist for the Crescents in 1958, joining the Delltones in 1962. Loughnan diversified into arranging and playing jazz tenor saxophone with the Daly-Wilson Big Band. By December 1973 Ayers Rock had signed with Mushroom Records, which released their first single – "Rock 'n Roll Fight (Going On)", one of the label's early records. Mushroom Records co-owner Michael Gudinski became their manager.

In January 1974 Ayers Rock performed at the Sunbury Pop Festival and "Morning Magic" (written by Burton) appeared on the live album, Highlights of Sunbury '74 Part 2, released by Mushroom Records later that year. In March Burton returned to the US and was replaced on guitar and lead vocals by Chris Brown, formerly of Python Lee Jackson. Loughnan and Brown had played together in London as members of Kala. The band traced their origins to rock or pop bands from Sydney, except for Kennedy (who was from Melbourne).

=== 1974–75: Big Red Rock ===
Music from Big Red Rock
"Lady Montego" (1974), written by Duncan McGuire
20-second sample of the vocal

In 1974 Ayers Rock began recording their debut album, Big Red Rock, at Festival Records' 24-track studio in Sydney. They were dissatisfied with the sound, which failed to capture their music's "live" essence, and recorded it live-in-the-studio at Armstrong's in Melbourne that September. Kennedy told Margaret MacIntyre of Rolling Stone Australia, "Doing the album live was an experiment really and it seemed to work." Big Red Rock, released in November, peaked at number 32 on the Kent Music Report album chart. The album had "a more jazz-rock edge" and its single, "Lady Montego" (written by McGuire), was a new version of a song originally performed by Leo de Castro and Friends. According to Juke Magazine, "the single lifted to push the album, 'Lady Montego' ... received three weeks airplay and was then dumped." "Lady Montego" was Ayers Rock's most-aired single in Australia, and Kennedy said: "Without AM radio support you can't sell too well in this country." Juke called their songs "lyrically banal" but said the group compensated with "sheer talent", instrumentally and electronically.

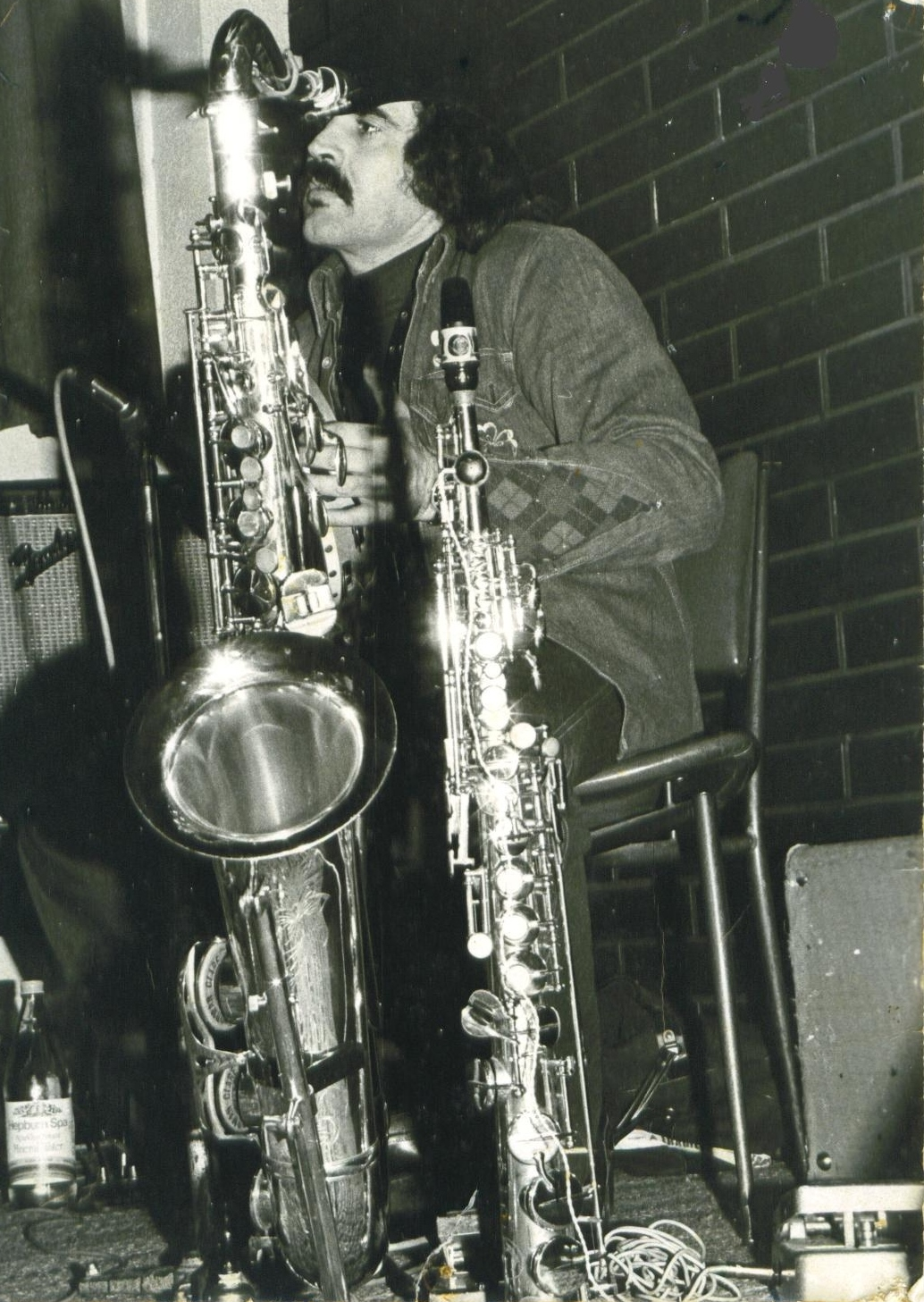
Col Loughnan of Ayers Rock (1973–76), partly obscured by his saxophones (tenor at left, soprano), in late 1974. He plays a tambourine whilst seated.

A song from Ayers Rock's live set was a cover of "Boogie Woogie Waltz", written by Joe Zawinul of Weather Report for the US group's album Sweetnighter (April 1973). In November 1974 Loughnan temporarily stopped performing live due to back pain, and the band continued with four members. He returned after surgery, and contemporary photos and video show him playing sitting down during his convalescence.

Manager and label owner Gudinski visited the US in December 1974 to promote his recording artists, including Skyhooks, Daddy Cool, and Madder Lake, to major labels there. At that time only Ayers Rock were successful, with Gudinski signing them to A&M Records within days. He told Tony Wilson of The Sun, "Jerry Moss, the president of A&M Records USA, flipped when he heard it, so A&M will release it (Big Red Rock) world-wide." This was a surprise to the Australian media, since many other artists were more commercially successful locally than Ayers Rock. Skyhooks were Australia's most popular band; their first album (Living in the 70's, released in October 1974) sold 226,000 units, the best-selling album by a local artist in Australia to date. However, Living in the 70's was rejected by A&M and not released outside Australia. Ayers Rock were the first Mushroom Records artists to sign a recording contract with an international label. From the mid-1970s, and into the 1990s, Mushroom were successful with many other artists including Split Enz, Kylie Minogue, and Yothu Yindi, turning the label into Australia's largest independent record company.

In January 1975, the group performed at the fourth Sunbury Pop Festival, and Big Red Rock and "Lady Montego" were released in the US on 28 February. On 20 April, they performed at a benefit concert for Bangladesh at the Sidney Myer Music Bowl with the La De Da's, Jim Keays, AC/DC, Phil Manning, Daddy Cool, Toulouse & Too Tight, the Dingoes, and the Moir Sisters.

From July to September, they promoted Big Red Rock in the US and Vancouver. The band played to an audience of 35,000 at a stadium concert in Seattle, supporting Bachman–Turner Overdrive, on 27 July and opened for Status Quo, the J. Geils Band, Lynyrd Skynyrd, and Nils Lofgren. According to Australian rock music historian Ian McFarlane, "Ayers Rock was the first Australian band to play to massive crowds on the USA touring circuit", years before fellow Australians the Little River Band, AC/DC, and Air Supply made their first US tours.

=== 1975–76: Beyond ===
At the end of their US tour in September 1975, Ayers Rock recorded their second album, Beyond, at the Record Plant in Los Angeles. The album, produced by the group and John Stronach, received a $60,000 advance from A&M Records.

On 18 October, The Sun reported that McGuire had left the band. At a reception when Ayers Rock returned to Australia, he said: "The pressure of the tour was just too much. We were on the road all the time and I guess I wasn't as strong as the rest of the band. When we got into the studio I had the shakes. I mean I was playing the right notes, but not in the right places." To finish the album McGuire's friend Les Young (Note: Young had previously worked with Doyle and Loughnan in The Soulmates in 1967.) played some of the bass guitar parts, and American Jeff Castleman played bass on "Catchanemu". Young also briefly played live with Ayers Rock in Australia, including an October 1975 show at the State Theatre in Sydney. McGuire returned to the group at the Dallas Brooks Hall on 21 October 1975, to warm applause.

Cover of the US version of Beyond (April 1976), shows an outback scene when upright and the head of an Australian aboriginal man when the cover is rotated 90° to the right (cover design by Ian McCausland).

In late November, Ayers Rock appeared at the final Reefer Cabaret event, at Ormond Hall in Prahran. (Note: The Reefer Cabaret was a regular concert event held at various community halls in Melbourne (from August 1974 to 1976) including Dallas Brooks Hall, East Melbourne and Ormond Hall, Prahran. According to Kimball some venue operators had "qualms about the moral dangers of loud music and dope-smoking.") The performance was recorded for a double album, A-Reefer-Derci (1976). In January 1976, Rock Australia Magazine named Ayers Rock Musicians of the Year for 1975 in their "New Year's Honours List". Kennedy left to join Marcia Hines' backing band in February 1976, and they reportedly married late in the decade. In Ayers Rock, Kennedy was temporarily replaced by Doug Gallacher. In April 1976, Beyond was released in Australia and the US, making the Kent Music Report top 50. Two singles from the album were released: "Little Kings" (October 1975) and "Song for Darwin" (May 1976), but neither charted.

The US cover for Beyond features a rock in the distance, which becomes the face of an Aboriginal man with eyes closed when the cover is rotated 90° to the right. Artist and Mushroom Records art director Ian McCausland also designed The Rolling Stones' 1973 Australian tour poster. The album cover illustrates a central principle of Aboriginal spirituality: the deep connection between the land and the Aboriginal peoples. In an Aboriginal and Torres Strait Islander Commission publication, "Our Land Our Life", S. Knight described the Aboriginal position: "We don't own the land, the land owns us. The land is my mother, my mother is the land. Land is the starting point to where it all began." According to the Australian government webpage, The Dreaming: "Once the ancestor spirits had created the world, they changed into trees, the stars, rocks, watering holes or other objects. These are sacred places of Aboriginal culture."

In May 1976, Gallacher was replaced by Russell Dunlop, formerly of Aesop's Fables, Levi Smith's Clefs, SCRA, Mother Earth, and the Johnny Rocco Band. In an interview with Greg Kelton of The Advertiser, Loughnan outlined the band's future: "If Beyond doesn't make it for us in the States we might as well forget all about Ayers Rock." From May to July they toured the US again, "only achiev[ing] limited success overseas." After the tour Dunlop and Loughnan left, and on 25 August Mushroom Records announced that Ayers Rock had broken up after Loughnan decided to remain in the US to study. Brown, Doyle, and McGuire indicated that they would revive the group with new members.

=== 1977–81: Hotspell ===
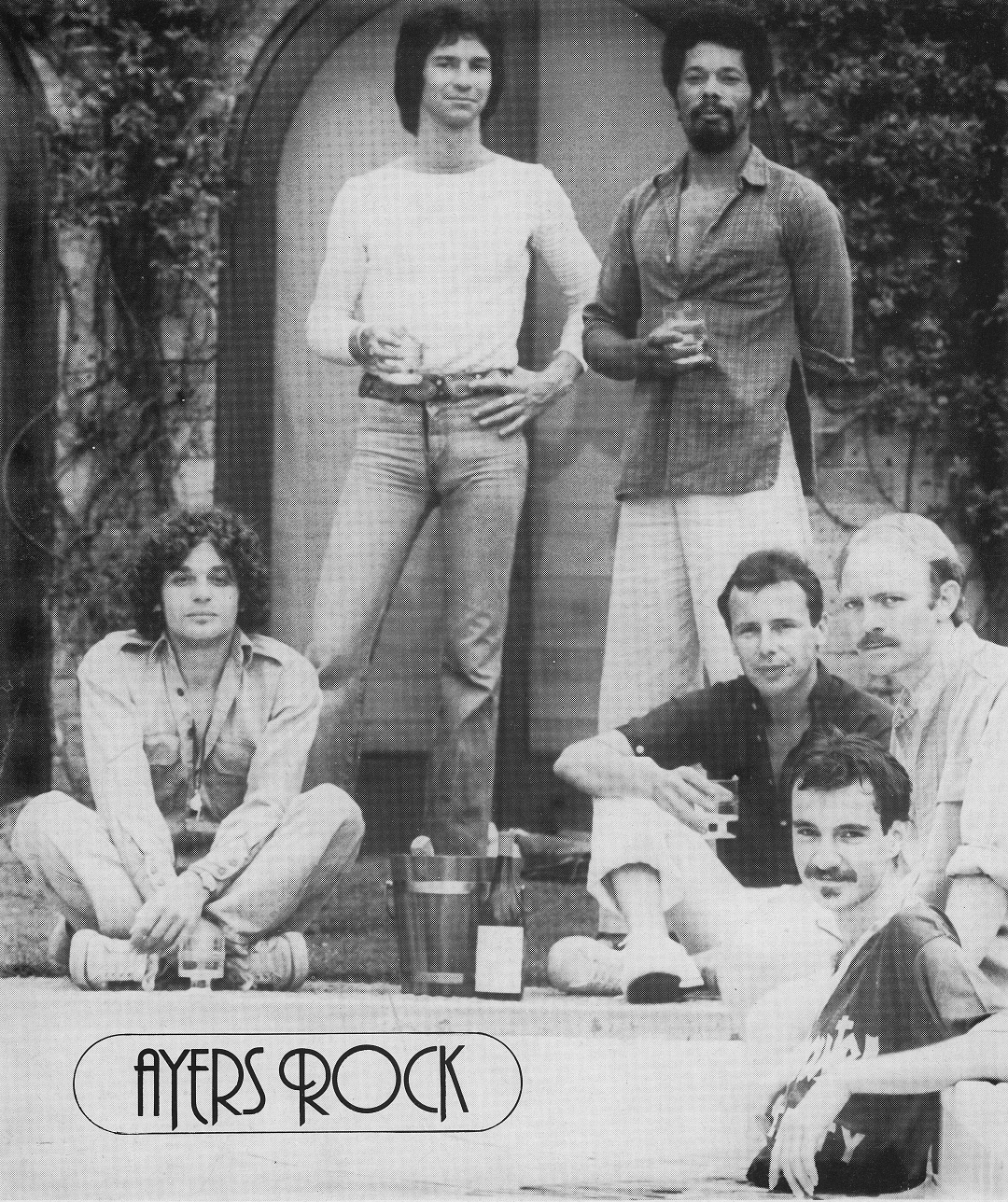
1980 line-up. Clockwise from left: Andy Cowan, Steve Hogg, Keith Caisey, Jimmy Doyle, Chris Brown, Hamish Stuart.

In 1977 Brown and Doyle re-formed Ayers Rock with Bermuda-born Keith Caisey on percussion, Joe Tattersall (formerly of Healing Force and the Barry Leef Band) on drums, and John Young (formerly of Leo de Castro's eponymous group) on bass guitar. By 1978 Brown, Caisey and Doyle were joined by Andy Cowan (formerly of Madder Lake) on keyboards and vocals, Steve Hogg (formerly of Bakery) on bass guitar, and Hamish Stuart on drums. In March 1980 the band released another single, "On the Avenue", followed in May by their third LP – Hotspell – on their own Red Rock Records (distributed by RCA Records). Recorded at the Music Farm Studios in Byron Bay, it was engineered by former member Duncan McGuire.

In The Canberra Times, Luis Feliu noted the "new-sounding" Ayers Rock and their "laid-back" style. There had been a major change in songwriting, with Brown contributing less (wrote one and co-wrote one with Doyle); Cowan was the most active (writing five tracks), and Stuart and Doyle co-wrote two. Doyle, with no writing credits on previous albums, wrote "On the Road" (which was included in the band's live sets from 1978). Jillian Burt of Juke Magazine described it as "reminiscent of the cool, calm, collectedness that typifies Steely Dan". Hotspell featured soft-rock songs with sophisticated, keyboard-centred arrangements.

Samples from Hotspell
"On the Road", written by Jimmy Doyle

"On the Avenue", written by Andy Cowan

According to Feliu's review of the album and a July 1980 performance in Sydney, Ayers Rock were "once Australia's hottest progressive rock" group. Feliu wrote that most of the audience seemed to appreciate the band's new direction: "the capacity audience showed hearty approval ... probably old allegiance, and only a few comments of dissatisfaction, like 'boring', were heard, then that was at the bar up the back". Hotspell did not reach the Kent Music Report album top 100, and has not been released on CD. In July 1981 the group released a final single, "Lies", before disbanding later that year.

== Other projects ==
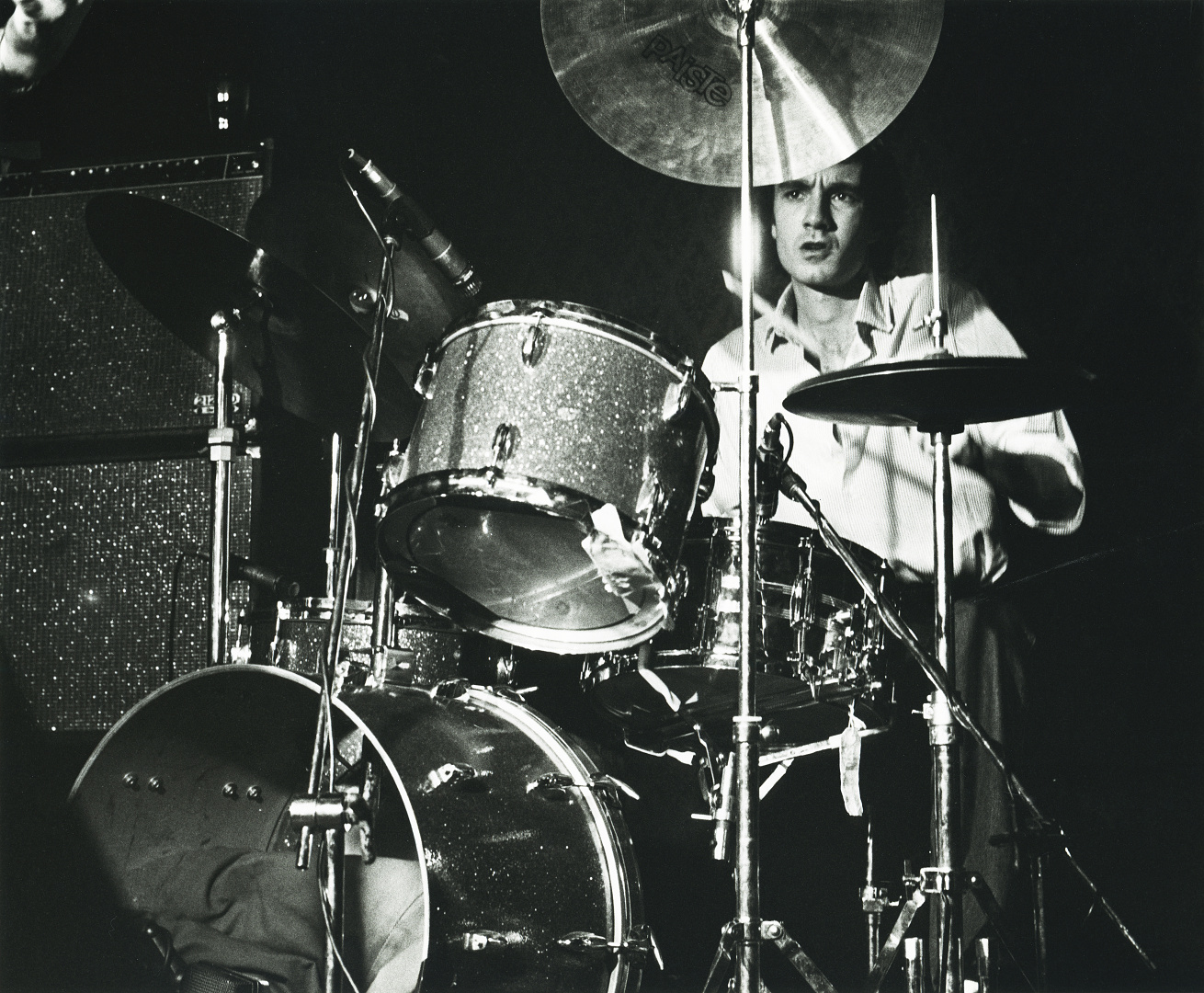
Hamish Stuart on drums (1978–81), performing in 1981.

In late 1974, Ayers Rock members Brown, McGuire, Kennedy and Loughnan played on several tracks of Jim Keays' debut solo album, The Boy from the Stars. At the January 1975 Sunbury Pop Festival Keays performed most of the album live, with three Ayers Rock members (Brown, McGuire and Kennedy) joining the ensemble to record "Nothing Much Left" and "Urantia". Returning to the US, Burton was a session player for Billy Joel and Jimmy Webb and wrote "Best Friend" for the film Airport 1975 (1974). In 1976, he formed the Ray Burton Band with Rex Bullen, Terry Gascoine, Steve Hogg and Tim Piper. From 1977 to 1980, McGuire was bass guitarist for the Southern Star Band with Doug Parkinson on vocals, Tommy Emmanuel on guitar and Kennedy on drums. In 1978 Burton released a solo album, Dreamers and Nightflyers, which spawned the singles "Too Hard to Handle" and "Paddington Green". After touring with Crossfire in 1979, he returned to the US as a songwriter.

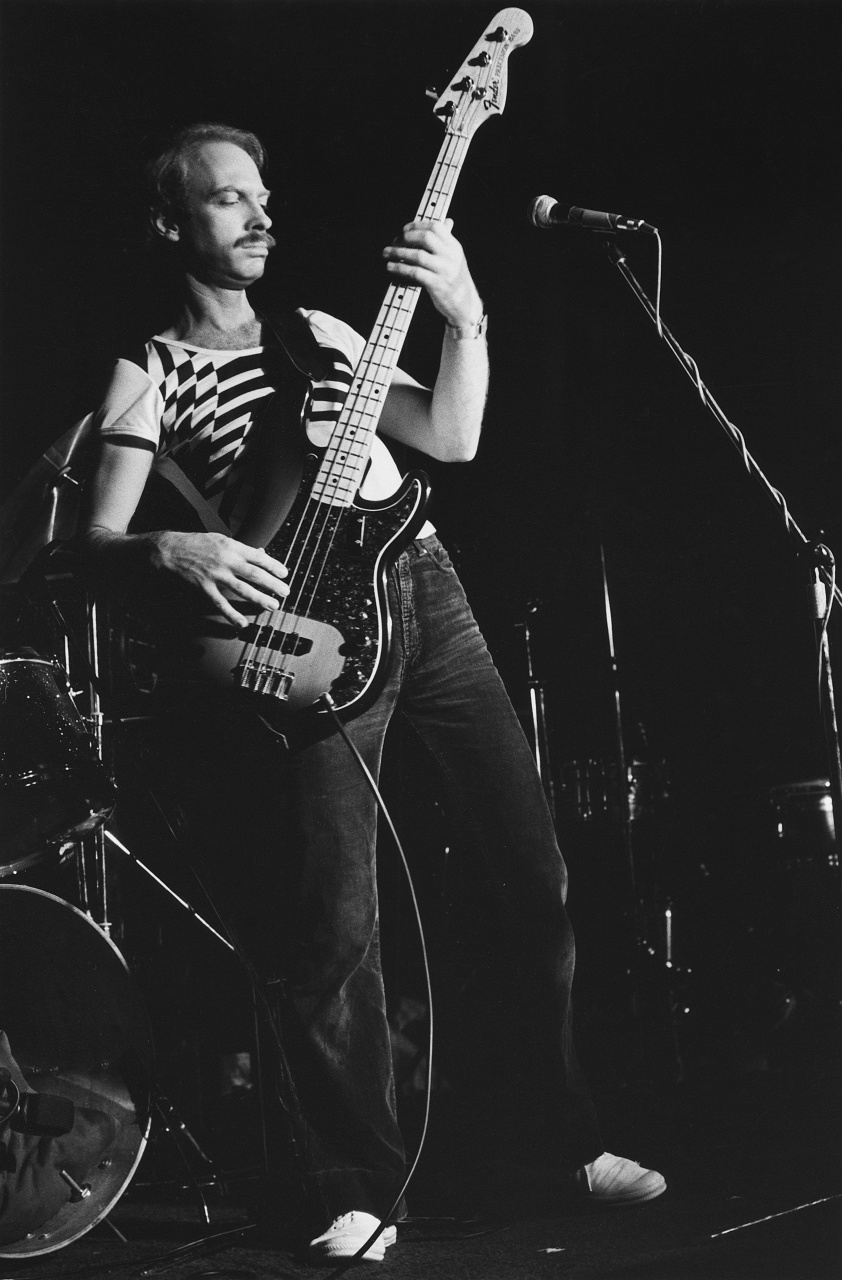
Chris Brown of Ayers Rock (1974–81), playing bass guitar, 1981. Brown usually provided lead guitar and vocals.

Cowan was later a member of Kevin Borich Express, Ian Moss Band and Renée Geyer Band before pursuing a solo music career. Georgie Fame's album No Worries (1988) included Ayers Rock alumni Loughnan, Doyle, and Dunlop. McGuire died in July 1989 of a brain tumour. During the late 1980s, Hogg formed The Rhythm Snakes with Clayton Black on drums, Howie Smallman on harmonica, and Bob Thorne on guitar. In 1989, Hogg assembled a studio band to record a solo album with Thorne, Mark Alderman on harmonica, Ian Ironside on drums, Bob Patient on piano, and Bernie Payne on saxophone. Steve Hogg died on 20 July 1990 and his album, Various Fools & Vices, was released in 1992.

In 1993, Kennedy drummed for The Blazing Salads with Brian Cadd, Glenn Shorrock, Rex Goh, and Kirk Lorange. Hamish Stuart played drums on Chris Abrahams and Melanie Oxley's 1998 album, Jerusalem Bay. Doyle died on 5 May 2006, and on 28 May the Jim Doyle Tribute Concert was played at the Basement in Sydney. Musicians included Renée Geyer, Billy Field, bandmate Loughnan, and Barry Leef, with proceeds benefiting Doyle's family. Dunlop died on 16 May 2009; he had collapsed after drumming at his son's wedding in Sydney. As of 2015, Loughnan is a lecturer in jazz saxophone at the University of Sydney's Conservatorium of Music and has been a member of its Jazz Faculty since 1978. In 2007 he released a solo album, Ellen St. Mark Kennedy died on 21 February 2026 after a long period of ill health.

== Musicianship ==
=== Genres ===
Although Ayers Rock's music is described as jazz-rock, this is a simplification. In the 2011 radio documentary Rare Collections, presented by David and Jordie Kilby on Jazz-Rock in Australia for 666 ABC Canberra, Loughnan described other Mushroom Records artists as playing pop rock styles and Ayers Rock playing some jazz: "We were a bit of both". Critics called Big Red Rock's side one its "song" side and side two its "jazz" side. "Lady Montego", "Talkin' 'Bout You", "Goin' Home" and "Nostalgic Blues" are rock songs; the first three were written by McGuire, and the fourth by Brown.

Spoken-word introduction from Big Red Rock
"Crazy Boys" (1974)
Introduction to "Crazy Boys", live in the studio

Loughnan's "Crazy Boys" highlighted the band's larrikin side, with working-class men talking at a hamburger shop; each used local slang or spoke in a stereotypical ethnic accent, poking fun at Australians from a variety of backgrounds. At one point "Hey, listen, mate, give me one 'Gudinskiburger', please; hold the bacon, please" is heard; Michael Gudinski, whose parents are Jewish immigrants, did not eat pork and went along with the joke. Another voice mentions "Dr. Hopontopovus, the Greek gynaecologist". More slang is heard later in the track, including "Who yer sayin' that to, yer drongo?"

Although "Crazy Boys" has two lines of lyrics, most of the track is instrumental. Described by a Juke Magazine reviewer as "free form jazz", it features solos by Brown, Doyle, and Loughnan and heavily processed guitars, electric saxophone, and vocals. Asked about the group's use of electronics by Eloe Fanouche of RAM, Loughnan answered: "You've got to be able to use them well in order to sound good. We use them to colour the sounds as much as possible."

Music from Big Red Rock
"Big Red Rock", title track (1974), written by Col Loughnan
Soundscape early in the track, evoking the spirituality of the sacred aboriginal place known as Uluru

The title track, Loughnan's "Big Red Rock", is an eight-and-a-half-minute instrumental described by Juke Magazine as "expertly capturing the stark loneliness and cosmic tranquility one gets standing before their namesake rock". According to Loughnan, the atmosphere they wanted to create was "that spacey sort of feeling—like desert [...] and we wanted to get the sound of the didgeridoo—which we did electronically". Doyle imitated a didgeridoo by playing guitar with a wah-wah pedal. Tony Catterall of The Canberra Times praised "Big Red Rock", saying that it "suggests the huge expanse of the outback, then takes you [...] to the Aboriginal secrets [...] [and evokes] the power surrounding the area [of Uluru] in a burst of truly inspired musicianship".

Gil Wahlquist of The Sydney Morning Herald called the album "heavily accented towards jazz." It has changing moods, with quiet moments which are "eerie, euphonic, and evocative." Aboriginal clapsticks and the imitation didgeridoo allude to the indigenous character of Uluru and the surrounding area. Another section is double-tempo jazz fusion with guitar and saxophone solos, complemented by a rhythm section driving to a crescendo. The section concludes with a rapid rallentando (slowing of tempo) to another gentle phase. Changes in tempo and volume are heard throughout the title track, in contrast to disco (featuring one tempo and volume, which was becoming more popular).

Music from Beyond
1976's "Moondah (beyond)", written by Col Loughnan
Illustrates the change from Australian indigenous sound in one section to a "European" sound in the next

Like Big Red Rock, the vastness of rural and outback landscapes were reflected in the artwork and music of Beyond. According to a review by Forester in The Age, the band and album have "titles to suggest space, time and distance" and some tracks had an "indigenous appeal". The lead track's title, "Moondah", translates into English as "beyond". In April 1976 Loughnan, who wrote the song, said in a TV Times interview: "The aborigines have had a raw deal in the past. The song expresses the hope that they get better treatment in the future". "Moondah (beyond)" begins with clapsticks, log drum, imitation didgeridoo, and sounds evocative of indigenous singing.

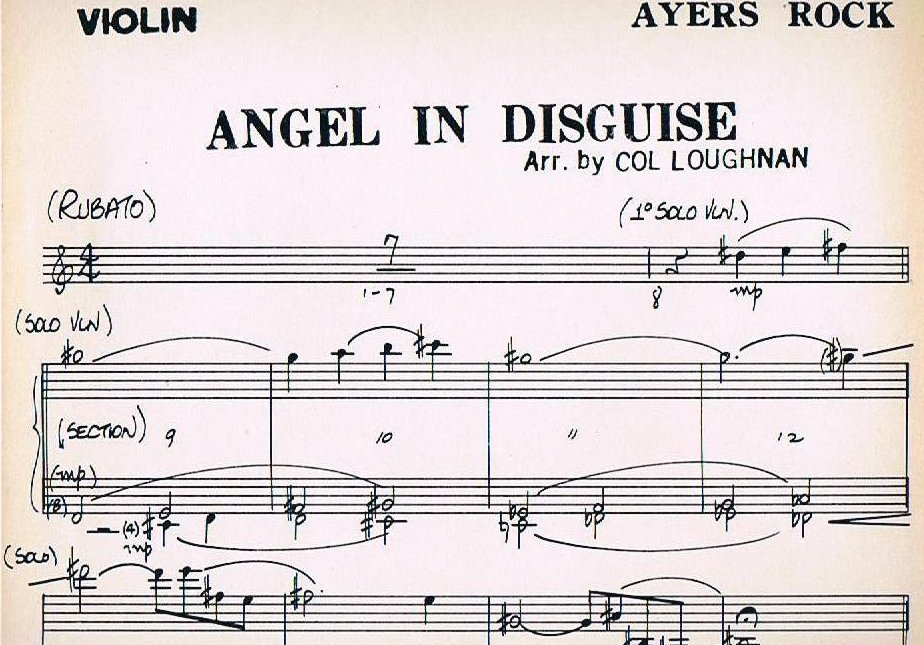
Manuscript of the violin part of "Angel in Disguise" from Beyond

This combination creates sounds similar to indigenous Australian music, which later segues into a European style before returning to its original theme. The overall effect is a fusion of indigenous Australian music, rock, and improvisational jazz by European Australians, before indigenous rock artists Yothu Yindi and No Fixed Address created their own fusions of indigenous and rock music.

Beyond featured a 23-piece string section, arranged and conducted by Loughnan, on "Place to Go", "Song for Darwin" and "Angel in Disguise". Loughnan had originally written "Angel in Disguise" years before for his wife, expanding it into an instrumental. According to Derek Johnson's RAM review, "The violin tones and guitar sounds are particularly well produced, dissolving into each other one moment, separating and circling around each other the next."

=== Airplay ===
Ayers Rock's treatment by Australian radio stations during the 1970s was related to the popularity of AM. Unlike the US, which had a vibrant FM radio scene, in 1976 Australia only had ABC FM and a few community FM stations (Note: Examples of public broadcasting FM stations: 2MBS, 3MBS, 4ZZZ. The first commercial FM radio stations began in 1980.) which primarily played classical music. Commercial AM stations, playing pop and rock music, dominated the local airwaves. The group established their reputation with live performances, exposure in print media, and word of mouth, with minimal Australian radio promotion.

Kennedy told a Juke interviewer, "Radio airplay has never happened for us here—except 2JJ and the occasional Album Shows". Australian Broadcasting Corporation (ABC) youth-oriented AM radio station 2JJ was limited to Sydney during the 1970s, with poor reception in some areas. The US attitude toward the band's music was different; according to Greg Kelton of The Advertiser, Beyond had "been played by about 50 radio stations in the (U.S.). 'It is being played on two [stations] in Australia', said Jimmy Doyle."

=== Live performance ===
Ayers Rock began incorporating rock-jazz fusion into their sets, increasing the jazz aspect of their music. In his review of a concert on 19 October 1975, Paul Gardiner wrote for Rolling Stone: "Big Red Rock was still tied quite closely to existing American styles." According to Gardiner, at the State Theatre "evidence" of jazz-rock "came through loud and clear". This was their first major Australian concert after their first US tour and recording sessions.

The group were fundamentally a high-volume rock band. In the smoke-filled bar of Martinis in Carlton, Juke Magazine collected a vox populi of the "packed to the rafters" audience. One person said, "I don't mind a bit of volume with my improvisation but this is so goddamn heavy." Gardiner's review described the group's live show:

The band ... have cut their teeth on pure rock and roll and have, [as of] Ayers Rock, moved on to what amounts to a rock-jazz fusion. The inversion of the term is becoming important; unlike the bands to which they are compared in America, which have all lived and breathed jazz in its purer, more traditional forms, ... [the] Rock is made up of rock musicians.

In a Rolling Stone interview by Margaret MacIntyre, Kennedy explained: "Ayers Rock was getting a live response that, to speak for myself, I hadn't seen happen with a crowd ... for a long time". In the same interview, Doyle described the key to their success: "This band is going somewhere ... it's not the same thing every night, unlike many bands, the arrangements change." Reviewers were enthusiastic about the band's performances; according to Gardiner, "The impression they now generate on stage is one of total energy ... energy which sets them apart." Juke Magazine called them "a band that could reward its audiences with (the) sheer exhilaration of seeing real master musicians ... taking their audiences to virgin territory that other explorers had only dreamed about."

Eloe Fanouche of RAM focussed on another aspect:

Unlike many groups they were able to capture the ethereal quality of their recorded sound on stage ... On being asked how live gigs compared to studio work, they all declared that the straight atmosphere of the studio was too clinical.

== Critical reception ==
=== Contemporary (1973 to 1981) ===
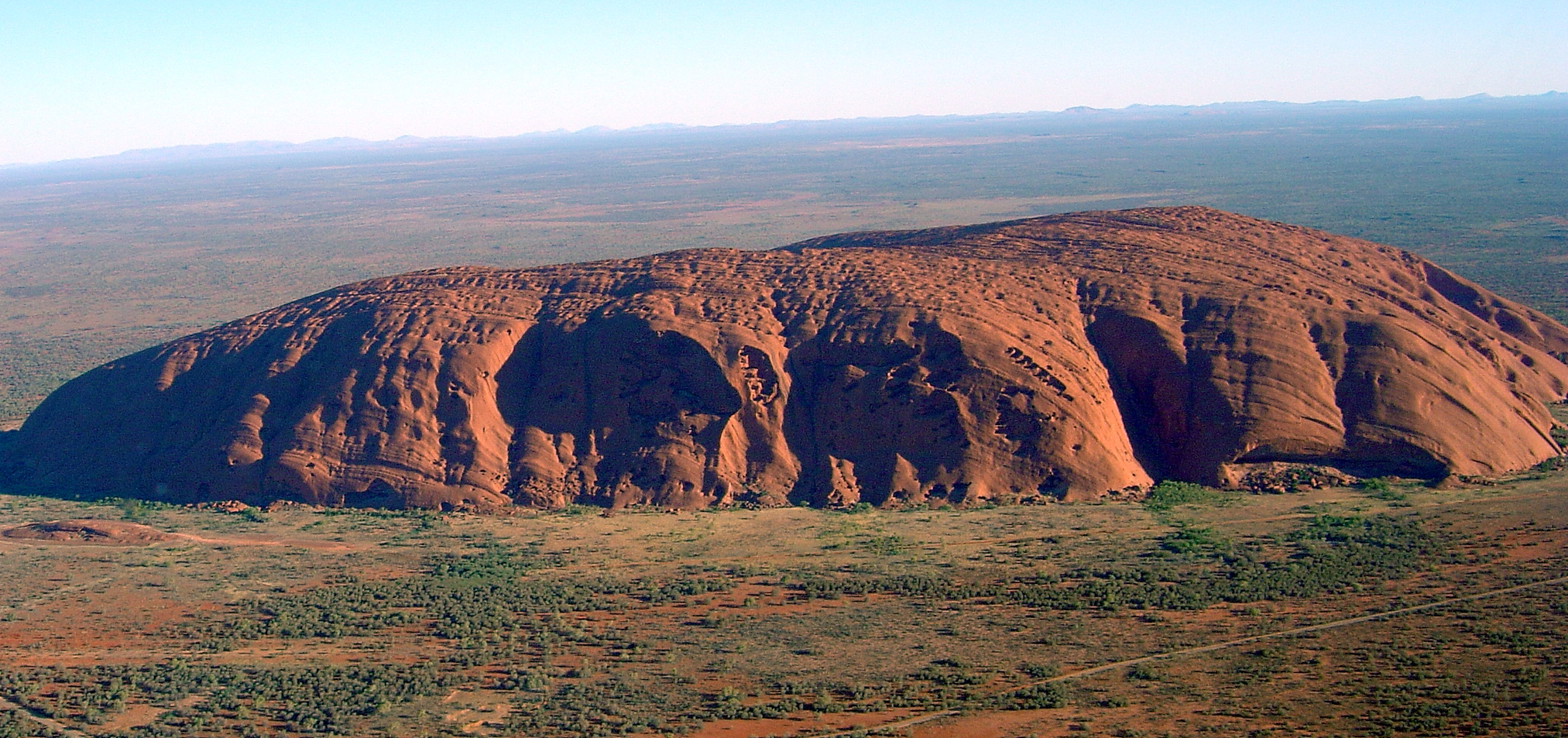
Uluru, then known as Ayers Rock by non-indigenous Australians, provided the band's name.

Big Red Rock received positive reviews in Australia and the US. The Canberra Times quoted a Cashbox review praising their music (Note: According to Tony Catterall, Cashbox reported: "People knew they were witnessing more than just another rock and roll band. Those vocals were classic for the genre and you just knew there was more than a dash of jazz in their influences. They could boogie with the best of them but it was boogie with substance and dimension. It was something different and something beautiful.") which ended: "It was something different and something beautiful." Billboard magazine gave the album a good review, saying that it featured "excellent sax work throughout and top-notch lead guitar and drum work". (Note: Full text: Interesting set in a kind of jazz rock vein, with side one featuring shorter cuts heavy on the vocals and side two serving up three long, primarily instrumental, jazz-oriented cuts. Excellent sax work throughout and top-notch lead guitar and drum work. A&M has done quite well with this kind of material in the past, with Tim Weisberg being one notable example. Set should receive FM play, and also receive some progressive jazz airing.) Australian reviewers called the album "an extremely good record, well worth owning", "a classic record in Australian rock" and "an inspiring success".

Critical response to their second album, Beyond, was generally positive. Sean Hanrahan wrote for the Melbourne Sunday Press: "Beyond to me stands as something of a crowning achievement for a band that has already been described as the high-water mark in Australian rock." According to Pat Bowring of the Melbourne Sun, "it is one of the best records from an Australian band" and "better than ... Big Red Rock." The band emphasised that their music was "essentially Australian", despite being recorded in Los Angeles, and critics noted their music's Australian character. Tony Catterall of The Canberra Times wrote that the group "has absorbed its influences so well that they're almost unrecognisable in the final product. And into this synthesis the band has infused some things peculiarly Australian."

=== Later (1999 to present) ===
In February 1998, Billboard's Christie Eliezer interviewed Gudinski; he recalled that signing Ayers Rock had "allowed the band to tour the US and record their second album there." He explained that they "were a fantastic jazz-fusion band, a real muso's band, but ultimately they didn't have that something unique to cross over." In his 1999 encyclopaedia Dreams, Fantasies, and Nightmares From Far Away Lands, American author Vernon Joynson called Big Red Rock "an excellent example of jazz rock fusion Australian style. The musicianship is of high quality although it tends to become a little over-indulgent in places". According to Joynson, the album had "radio friendly" material and three tracks "filled with fine virtuoso guitar and saxophone", but despite being "quite a popular live act, [Ayers Rock's] recordings were hampered by a dilemma over whether to opt for a more serious pursuit of expanding the horizons or for a commercial sound".

On MilesAgo.com in 2006, Duncan Kimball wrote: "The group's relatively short lifespan and small catalogue meant that they never really got the chance to reach their full potential." According to Ian McFarlane in his 1999 Encyclopedia of Australian Rock and Pop, the members of Ayers Rock "were seen as 'musician's musicians'. The band issued a series of technically proficient recordings, but in the long run any quest for commercial acceptance was marred by the seriousness of the music". In December 2011, Jordie Kilby called Big Red Rock "a great record; quite an influential (album) ... now one that's held in quite high regard."

== Members ==
- Ray Burton – guitar, lead vocals (1973–74)
- Mark Kennedy – drums (1973–76; died 2026)
- Duncan McGuire – bass (1973–76; died 1989)
- Jimmy Doyle – guitar, backing vocals (1973–81; died 2006)
- Col Loughnan – saxophones, backing vocals, flute, keyboards, percussion (1973–76)
- Phil Stone – guitar (1974)
- Chris Brown – lead vocals, guitar (1974–81)
- Les Young – bass (1975)
- Doug Gallacher – drums (1976)
- Russell Dunlop – drums (1976; died 2009)
- Joe Tattersall – drums (1977)
- Keith Caisey – percussion (1977–81)
- John Young – bass (1977–78)
- Andy Cowan – keyboards, backing vocals (1978–81)
- Steve Hogg – bass (1978–81; died 1990)
- Hamish Stuart – drums, backing vocals (1978–81)

== Discography ==
=== Albums ===
Title	Album details	Peak chart positions
Title	Album details	AUS
Big Red Rock	Released: November 1974; Label: Mushroom Records (L 35354)	32
Beyond	Released: February 1976; Label: Mushroom Records (L 35707)	50
Hotspell	Released: May 1980; Label:Red Rock/RCA Records (RRM 6321)	-

=== Singles ===
- "Rock 'n Roll Fight" (December 1973)
- "Lady Montego" (November 1974)
- "Little Kings" (October 1975)
- "Song for Darwin" (May 1976)
- "On the Avenue" (1979)
- "Lies" (July 1981)

=== Other appearances ===
- "Morning Magic" (live), on Highlights of Sunbury '74 Part 2 (Mushroom Records (L 25123), 1974)
- "Gimme Shelter" (live), "Boogie Woogie Waltz" (live) on A-Reefer-Derci (Mushroom Records (L 45657/8), 1976)
