= Duncan McGuire =

Duncan McGuire may refer to:

- Duncan McGuire (soccer) (born 2001), American soccer player
- Duncan McGuire (musician) (c. 1943–1989), Australian musician and founding member of band Ayers Rock
