= Russell Dunlop =

- Born: Russell James Dunlop; 21 October 1945; Paddington, New South Wales, Australia
- Died: 16 May 2009 (aged 63) Sydney, New South Wales, Australia
- Occupations: Musician; singer-songwriter; producer; engineer
- Instruments: Drums; vocals; percussion; synthesiser
- Years active: 1961–2009
- Formerly of: Aesop's Fables; Levi Smith's Clefs; SCRA; Mother Earth; Johnny Rocco Band; Ayers Rock; Player One / Player [1]

Russell James Dunlop (21 October 1945 – 16 May 2009) was an Australian musician, singer-songwriter and record producer-engineer. From the late 1970s he collaborated with Bruce Brown in a production company for albums and singles by Australian performers including Mental As Anything, The Reels and Machinations. As a musician he was a member of various groups such as Aesop's Fables (1968–70), Levi Smith's Clefs (1971), Southern Contemporary Rock Assembly (SCRA) (1971–72) and Ayers Rock (1976).

== Early life ==
Dunlop was born in 1945 in Paddington, New South Wales. His father, Hector Dunlop, was an engineer and his mother was Patricia. The couple had another son, Barry, and both were educated at Bourke Street Primary and Narwee Boys' High School. After leaving secondary school Dunlop worked as a tiler's labourer and then in a pharmaceutical factory. Dunlop began playing in bands as a drummer at 16.

== Career ==
=== 1968–1970: Aesop's Fables / The New Aesop's Fables ===
In 1968 Aesop's Fables formed as a pop vocal group with Dunlop on drums, Sheryl Blake on lead vocals, Jimmy Doyle on guitar (ex-Telstars), Michael Lawler on bass guitar and Gary Moberly on organ (ex-Ramrods, later worked with Bee Gees). The group performed cover versions, including The 5th Dimension, before working on originals. Dunlop also worked as a session drummer and vocalist. In 1969 Aesop's Fables entered the annual Hoadley's Battle of the Sounds competition and won the New South Wales final, at the national final they finished second behind Doug Parkinson in Focus. However this version of the group separated without recording any material.

In February 1970 Dunlop and Moberley formed a new line-up, initially called The New Aesop's Fables, with Owen Booth on bass guitar, Brenda Glover on lead vocals (ex-Jet Set) and Brian Holloway on guitar (ex-The Dream, Image). Holloway quit two months later and was replaced by Melbourne-based guitarist, Les Stacpool. The band moved to Melbourne in mid-year, where Charlie Tumahai replaced Booth on bass guitar. Dunlop met Judi Johnston and they married three months later. Aesop's Fables had disbanded by October 1970. The group's only single, "Little Yellow Pills", was issued posthumously in February 1971 as the first single on the Generation Records label. The A-side was a cover of a track by British singer, Jackie Lomax, and its B-side, "Sandman", was written by Stacpool.

=== 1970–1972: Levi Smith's Clefs / Southern Contemporary Rock Assembly ===
In 1970 Dunlop moved back to Sydney and was a member of another pop-rock group, Levi Smith's Clefs. It was fronted by Barrie "The Bear" McAskill on lead vocals and had a varied line-up including Jim Kelly on guitar (ex-Affair) and Mike Kenny on trumpet. The group held a year-long residency at The Chequers night club, Sydney. They issued two singles, "Live Like a Man" (September 1970) and "Gonna Get a Seizure" (April 1971) and followed with an extended play, Best of Whisky a Go Go.

Dunlop, Kelly and Kenny formed a jazz-rock group, Southern Contemporary Rock Assembly (SCRA), in mid-1971 together with Sheryl Black on lead vocals, Ian Bloxsom on percussion, Dave Ellis on bass guitar, Greg Foster on trombone and harmonica (ex-Heart 'n' Soul), Micky Leyton on vocals, Peter Martin on guitar and vocals (ex-Little Sammy and the In People) and Don Wright on tenor sax and flute (ex-Ram Jam Big Band). In December they issued their debut album, SCRA, which Australian musicologist, Ian McFarlane, compared to their regular "brash, commercial sound" – he found the album was "more restrained and slickly arranged". It provided a single, "Roly Poly", which peaked at No. 28 on the Australian Kent Music Report Singles Chart in April of the following year.

SCRA appeared at the inaugural Sunbury Pop Festival in January 1972 and provided a live version of "Roly Poly" for a double album, Sunbury. By April the group had relocated to the United States. Also in April Dunlop and fellow SCRA members appeared as the studio backing band for Dig Richards' album, Harlequin. SCRA recorded their second album, The Ship Album (1972), at The Hit Factory in New York; and at United Sound Studios, Sydney. McFarlane felt they had "dispensed with the lighter pop moments of the debut to concentrate on a more innovative and bluesy progressive jazz-rock sound". The group disbanded by the end of that year. During 1973 Dunlop provided drums on several tracks for the debut album, Prussian Blue, by singer-songwriter, Richard Clapton.

=== 1973–1978: Mother Earth / Johnny Rocco Band ===
In 1973, Dunlop and Kelly joined Mother Earth, a jazz-rock group, which had Harry Brus on bass guitar, Renée Geyer as lead singer (ex-Sun) and Mark Punch on guitar and vocals (ex-Nine Stage Horizon). In 1973 Rory O'Donoghue (of the Australian Broadcasting Corporation's TV comedy series, The Aunty Jack Show) on lead guitar and lead vocals formed a band, Cool Bananas, which Dunlop joined alongside Stein Bottington on bass guitar, Wayne Findlay on keyboards and Don Reid on flute and saxophone. Cool Bananas issued a single, "Been and Gone", in October. They followed with a novelty hit single, "Farewell Aunty Jack" (December 1973), which peaked at No. 1 for three weeks in the following year.

In February 1974, Dunlop and Punch founded the Johnny Rocco Band as a jazz-funk group, with Tony Buchanan on saxophone (ex-Thunderbirds, Daly-Wilson Big Band) and Tim Partridge on bass guitar (ex-Clockwork Oringe, King Harvest, Island, Mighty Kong). McFarlane declared that they were "one of the first Australian bands to incorporate funk and soul into the pub-rock forum". A fire at a night club destroyed the group's instruments and equipment three months later, however they continued to perform. They backed Grahame Bond ("Aunty Jack", from the show of that name) and O'Donoghue, on a national tour as Aunty Jack and the Gong.

By late 1974, Johnny Rocco Band had added Dunlop's former bandmate, Kenny, and a new associate, Leo de Castro on lead vocals (ex-King Harvest, Flite, Friends, De Castro). The group issued a single, "Heading in the Right Direction", in August 1975 and followed with their sole album, Rocco, in the following year. Punch had left the group just after the single's appearance, to join Geyer's backing band for her solo career – Geyer released a cover version of "Heading in the Right Direction" in 1976. For Rocco Dunlop provided drums and vibraphone as well as producing the recording, he co-mixed it with Bruce C. Brown.

In January 1976, Tony Catterall of The Canberra Times compared Rocco with Felix Cavaliere's second album, Destiny (1975). He found that there were "points of contact, apart from them both being soul, in the lyrics ... and the vocals" and that Dunlop's "production work is generally good, and he's roped in a solid list of session-men to add to the already highly talented band, Cavaliere shades him by a good deal." He summarised his opinion "The Johnny Rocco Band, and Dunlop in particular, could improve their already solid work by learning some lessons from Cavaliere. But the converse is true, too."

In May 1976, Dunlop left Johnny Rocco Band and replaced Mark Kennedy on drums in the jazz-rock fusion band, Ayers Rock, which toured the US from May to July and included his previous bandmate, Doyle, as a member. He left that group before the end of the year. Dunlop and Doyle subsequently toured Australia in the Aussie Blue Flames, backing the British performer, Georgie Fame. Dunlop also recorded and toured with other acts, while becoming more involved in record engineering and producing. From the late 1970s, Dunlop and Brown began to collaborate at Albert Studios, where Brown had started as an audio engineer in 1974, the duo also formed their own independent production company, BAD (Brown and Dunlop).

=== 1979–1980s: Player 1 & other bands ===
Dunlop's credits as producer or co-producer (with Brown) include Machinations' Esteem, Mental As Anything's Cats and Dogs and Creatures of Leisure, Jon English's Words Are Not Enough and Doug Ashdown's single, "Winter in America". As well as working with local acts, Dunlop and Brown recorded as Player One for the 1979 novelty single, "Space Invaders", which was inspired by the arcade video game of the same name, for Warner Bros. Records. It peaked at No. 3 on the Australian Kent Music Report Singles Chart and was followed by the related album, Game Over, in the next year.

In 1985, Dunlop contributed on the Australian supergroup Australia Too, which recorded "The Garden". The song peaked at number 22.

== Final years and death ==
Dunlop continued to play in live bands but session work gradually dried up during the 1990s, especially for drummers, as computerised rhythm machines increasingly replaced live musicians for recording. He worked as a radio operator for a courier company for a decade, before moving with his family to Lismore in 2007, where he set up a small studio, and more recently he worked as an ensemble coach at Southern Cross University. One of his last music projects was producing and mixing the soundtrack for the Rachel Ward movie Beautiful Kate, which had its world premiere at the Sydney Film Festival in June 2009.

Dunlop died on 16 May 2009 – he had collapsed after playing a drum set at his son's wedding in Sydney. He is survived by his wife, Judi, his son, Aaron and his daughter, Kane. Dunlop's funeral was held at the Northern Suburbs Crematorium on 22 May.
