= Col Loughnan =

Australian jazz saxophonist and composer (born 1942)

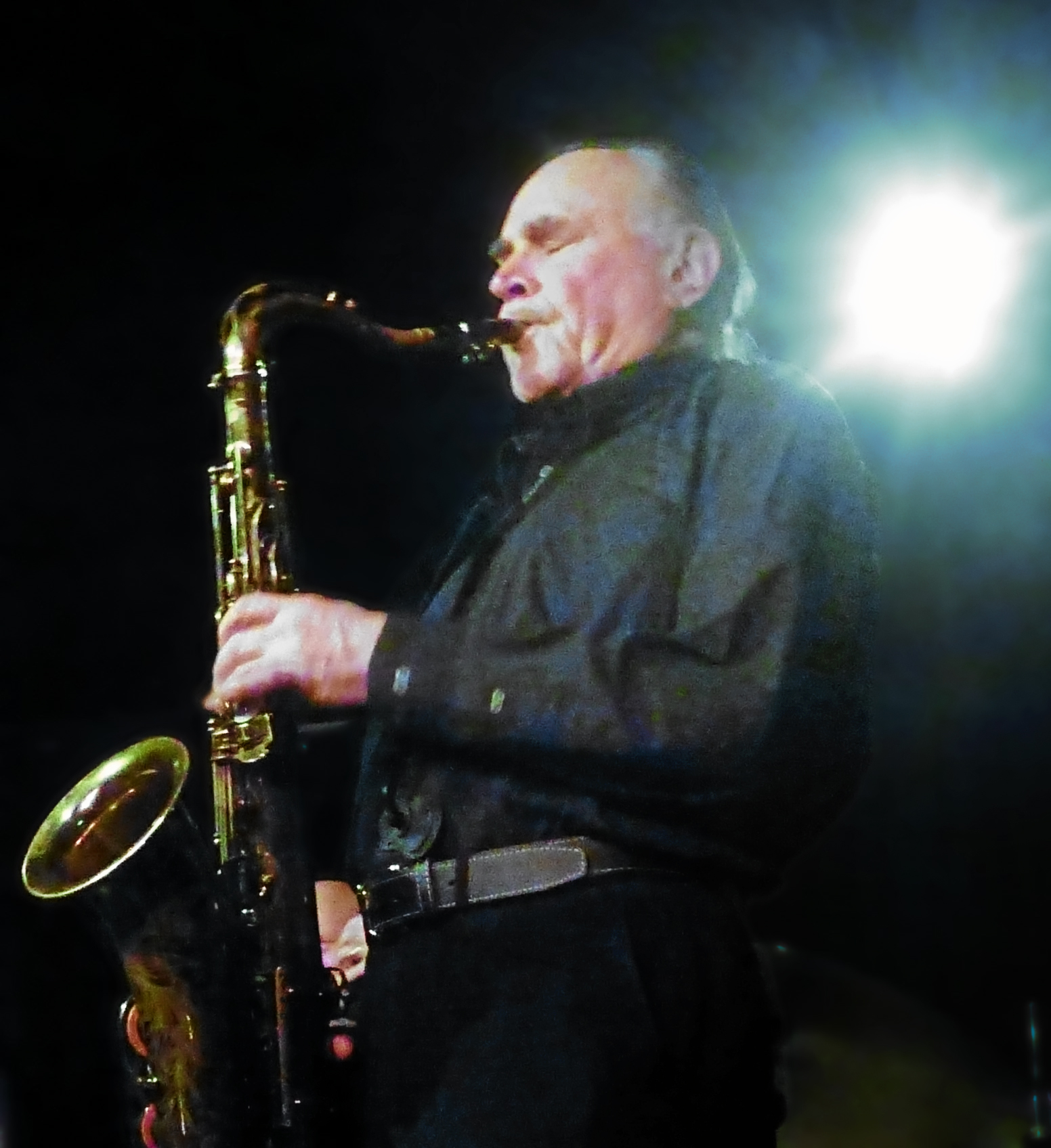
- Loughnan performing in 2015
- Born: Colin John Loughnan; 26 October 1942 (age 83); Sydney, New South Wales, Australia
- Occupations: Musician; arranger; teacher; composer; musical director; vocalist
- Years active: 1957–present
- Employer: Sydney Conservatorium of Music/freelance
- Term: 1978–present
- Spouse: Rhonda Loughnan (m. 1966)
- Children: 2
- Musical career
- Genres: Vocal harmony; rock; soul; progressive rock; jazz fusion; jazz
- Instruments: Saxophone; flute; clarinet; piano
- Labels: Leedon; Festival; Columbia; Mushroom; A&M; La Brava; Newmarket
- Website: colloughnan.com

Colin John Loughnan (born 26 October 1942) is an Australian jazz saxophonist, teacher and composer, best known as a member of the Delltones, Ayers Rock, Judy Bailey quartet and as a teacher of saxophone at the Sydney Conservatorium of Music. Although Loughnan has long been associated with jazz music, the first nine years of his career were spent as a non-instrumental vocalist with vocal harmony groups The Crescents, and The Delltones starting in 1958. In the 60s, he learnt to play the saxophone, performing as an instrumentalist with Col Nolan and The Soul Syndicate, and as a founding member of the Daly-Wilson Big Band. At this time Loughnan was proficient in saxophones, flutes, and clarinet.

By the early 1970s, Loughnan had included session work, arranging music for television, and studying in the United States under Victor Morosco to his achievements. He was playing with Kala in London in 1973, before returning to Australia to join progressive rock, jazz fusion outfit Ayers Rock. Loughnan was a major influence on the sound of the band, and wrote most of their musically adventurous material. At the end of Ayers Rock's second tour of the United States, Loughnan chose to remain in the United States to continue his studies. He flew back to Australia in 1978 to take up the position of lecturer in saxophone, and arranging at the Sydney Conservatorium of Music Jazz Faculty. Concurrent with teaching, he was playing jazz, working as a studio musician, and acting as musical director for Marcia Hines, and John Farnham, for ABCTV specials.

Loughnan has played with many top international artists including Sammy Davis Jr., Freddie Hubbard, Shirley Bassey, Frank Sinatra and Johnny Mathis. He has played with a very long list of Australian musicians including Don Burrows, John Sangster, George Golla, Rhonda Burchmore, Errol Buddle, Bob Barnard and New Zealander Ricky May. His long-term collaboration with Judy Bailey has extended from the late 1970s to the present. Another collaborator, guitarist Steve Murphy joined Loughnan to record the album Feel the Breeze as a duo in 1981. In the early 1980s, he studied under venerated saxophone teacher Joe Allard in New York City. He has led his own combo's the Col Loughnan Endeavour, and the Col Loughnan quartet.

Loughnan toured with Georgie Fame and The Aussie Blue Flames on Fame's frequent visits to Australia from 1979 to 2006. He has entertained both great and small, playing with the Sydney and Queensland Symphony Orchestras, and creating children's music in the studio for Australia's ABC Records. Loughnan recorded a solo album Ellen St., in 2007, of his own compositions, which was produced by his son, bassist Lyal Loughnan, and Loughnan himself. He was involved in a scientific experiment at The University of New South Wales, nicknamed the "Frankensax" experiment, which investigated the acoustics inside the mouth, and throat of a saxophonist while playing. He remains active in teaching and playing, often with friend Judy Bailey

== Early life ==
Video of an improvised solo by Col Loughnan on tenor saxophone in 2015

Loughnan was born on 26 October 1942, in Sydney. His parents, Con and Merle lived in Ellen St., Randwick, an inner south–east suburb of Sydney. They were a musical family, and enjoyed the jazz and popular artists of the day. By coincidence, Frank Coughlan, a Sydney bandleader and trombonist, lived next door. Interactions with Coughlan lead the young Loughnan to ask his parents to buy him a trumpet, which received a polite but firm "no". It was decided that it would be better to stick to singing.

Loughnan attended Marist Brothers College, Randwick, where he sang in the school choir with good friend Mike Downes. Loughnan briefly played drums in the school marching band. He also excelled in swimming. From 1957, he studied at South Sydney Junior Technical High School (now known as South Sydney High School), after which he was employed as an apprentice fitter and turner.

== Career ==
=== The Crescents ===
Downes and Loughnan were joined by Dennis O'Keefe (all Marist Brothers alumni), and Kel Palace, (Note: real name: Kel Palise) who lived near O'Keefe, to form a vocal quartet, The 4 Tops. Loughnan was 16 years old. The 4 Tops were regular performers, in late 1958, at the Leichhardt Police Boys Club dances, run by Johnny O'Keefe (no relation to Dennis O'Keefe). A few months later, Dennis O'Keefe left to join the Air Force, and the remaining trio changed their name to The Crescents. Johnny O'Keefe became their manager, and Loughnan recalled that "everyone respected [O'Keefe] ... but that was understandable – he was THE MAN".

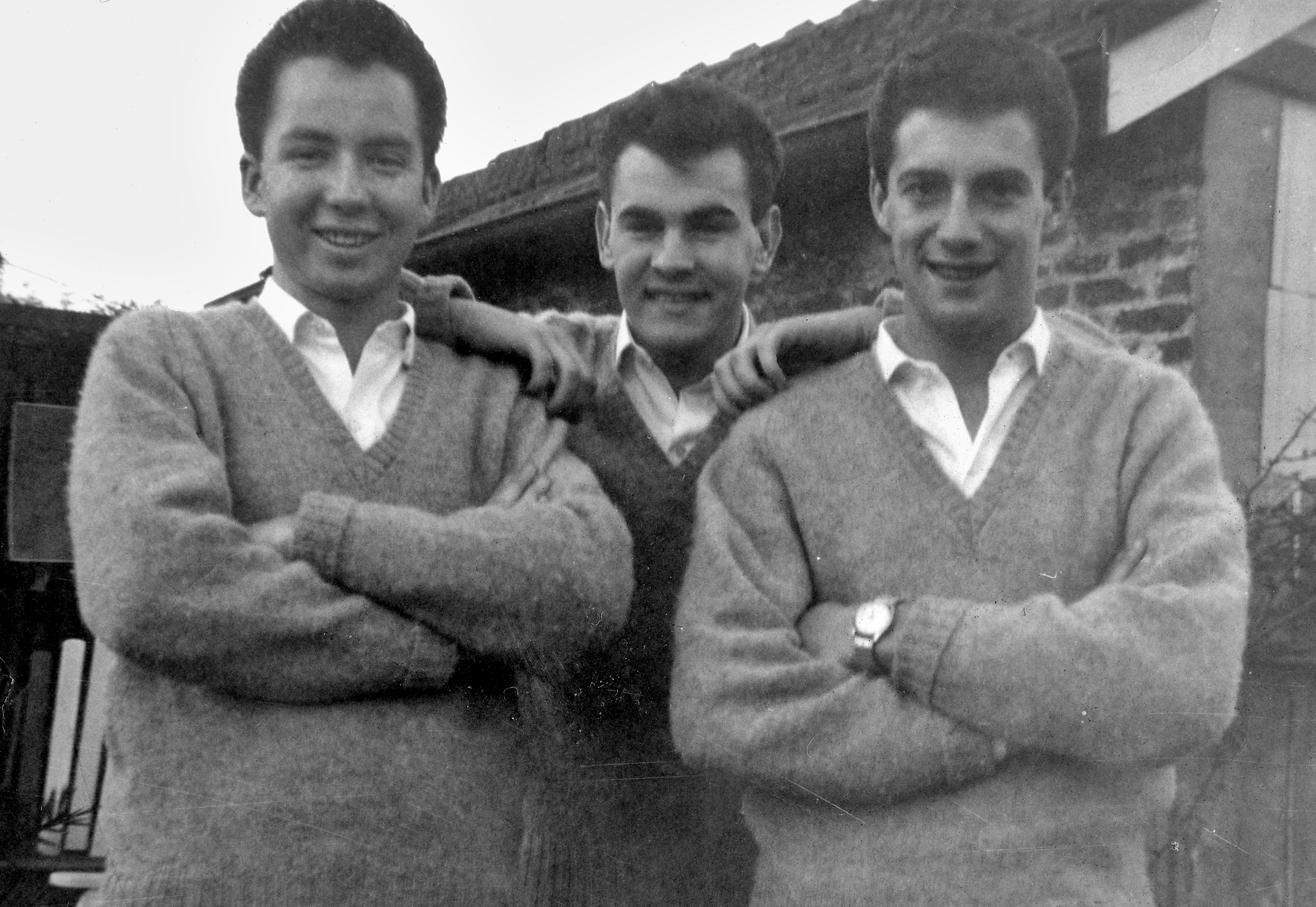
The Crescents, (l to r) Mike Downes, Col Loughnan, and Kel Palise.

O'Keefe invited The Crescents to appear on his television program "Six O'Clock Rock" on 7 March 1959. This success later lead to further appearances on "Six O'Clock Rock", "Bandstand", and "Teen Time". The Crescents were heavily influenced by American vocal groups of the period, practising and working on their arrangements at Palace's parents' house, with Loughnan on the piano.

Promoter, Lee Gordon was closely associated with O'Keefe, and signed the group to his Leedon recording label. Gordon also drafted The Crescents into his "Big Shows": The Johnnie Ray Show in August 1959, and Fabian in October the same year. In an interview with Damian Johnstone, Loughnan remembered the aftermath of the Johnnie Ray Show:

"we were all working on jobs prior to the tour, but after that tour we gave our jobs up. We made a fortune, or what seemed like a fortune, on that tour. I remember coming home with all this money ... We were all good looking guys in those days (laughing) ... We all wore the same clothes – with the quarter moon crescent insignia".

These large scale tours allowed The Crescents to perform on the same bill as many of the top popular music acts in Australia, as well as the visiting American stars. They received good reviews including The Age, which stated that "of the ... supporting artists, The Crescents vocal group were the most popular" apart from Australian pop idol, O'Keefe.

==== Chart success ====
In October 1959, Leedon released their first single, "Everlovin'" backed with "You Broke My Heart", the latter being co-written by Loughnan and O'Keefe, but it failed to chart. The follow-up, "Mr. Blue" was a Top 5 hit in Brisbane, and Melbourne, however it was their only chart success. With a hit record, The Crescents became the main competition for the Delltones. Their next record, "When You Wish upon a Star" was released in April 1960.

O'Keefe crashed his expensive imported red Plymouth near Kempsey in June 1960, suffering severe head, and facial injuries, and spending a fortnight in hospital. This had a profound effect on O'Keefe's life. Five months later, Loughnan was, himself, a passenger in a car crash. In November 1960, Loughnan, Alan Heffernan, Barry Stanton, and Ray Hoff were rounding a bend on a Victorian road, when a tyre blew out. Loughnan recounted:

"the next thing I remember was the car rolling over and over. The car went down an embankment and landed upside down. None of us were really badly hurt ... It had a bad effect on me. I remember I had nightmares for years after that. I just hated it".

The Crescents were invited to perform at The Ricky Nelson Show in September 1960. These were the first concerts at which O'Keefe performed after his car accident. By June 1961, The Crescents had released another three singles, and two EPs, without any chart success.

==== Disbandment ====
In about July 1961, Downes decided to leave The Crescents, and was replaced by Alan Roberts. The new line-up recorded their final single, "Get a Job"/"Silhouettes", however, this was a period of low morale for the trio. Even so, they continued working for another year until Noel Widerberg of the Delltones died in a car accident on 7 July 1962. Loughnan explained: "The Crescents were on the way out ... [we] had jammed a lot with the Delltones at parties, etc ... I was pretty good mates with Warren Lucas and I'm sure he was one of the main ones who plugged for me to take over as lead singer of the Delltones. Auditions weren't held". The Crescents disbanded.

=== The Delltones ===
Loughnan was invited to become vocal harmony group, the Delltones, new lead singer in September 1962. He joined original members Warren Lucas (tenor), Ian (Peewee) Wilson (bass), and Brian Perkins (baritone). In November 1962, they cut a new single "Come a Little Bit Closer" by Leiber and Stoller, which became the Delltones biggest hit, making it to No. 1 in Sydney. The surf music inspired "Hangin' Five" by Ben Acton was also a big hit in November 1963. In the book, Pioneers of Australian Rock 'n' Roll, Graham Jackson quotes Loughnan saying:

"When we first heard the song, it was really slow and full of all these funny chords but we thought it had possibilities and rearranged the tempo and harmonies".

That year, the Delltones received four radio awards: the "Gold and Silver Baton Award", "Golden Microphone Award", and "The Best Australian Record Award". In this period, due to chart success, radio airplay, live performances, and many TV appearances, The Delltones were one of the most recognisable names in Australian music. From 1965, Loughnan was privately learning to play the saxophone at home in Randwick. The Delltones set out on an East Asian tour which included entertaining Australian soldiers in Vietnam. One of the five concerts in Vietnam was at Bien Hoa Air Base on 1 March 1966 in stifling heat. Loughnan married Rhonda Moore on 30 May 1966. During his time with the group, they released nine singles and two albums (excluding compilation albums). In 1967, Loughnan decided to take a very different direction, and left the Delltones after five years as a member.

=== The Soulmates ===
The Soulmates were a house band at the Coogee Bay Hotel, owned by Mrs. Munro, a widow who was known to have a favourite saying: "It's permanent, you know!". By October 1967, Loughnan had joined the band, not as a vocalist, but as a saxophonist. In his book Behind the Rock and Beyond, Leon Isackson describes the band's reaction: "everybody remembered [Loughnan] as the lead singer [of] the Delltones ... [and] here he was blowing us all away with the saxophone!" At that time, The Soulmates were led by guitarist, Jimmy Doyle along with Les Young on bass, Brian Myers on piano, Loughnan, and, shortly thereafter they were joined by drummer, Isackson. Loughnan and Doyle were to become lifelong friends, as well as working together from time to time over several decades.

The band played six nights a week from 8 pm to midnight, and there was a featured artist, usually a solo singer, that changed after a week or a fortnight. These artists included Dig Richards, Eden Kane, The Ambassadors, the Power Brothers, Johnny O'Keefe and Ray Burton. Over time, Young was replaced by Michael Lawler on bass, Doyle gave notice and Jon Hayton took over on guitar, and Myers was sacked with his place being taken by Dave Macrae. In early 1968, Loughnan's services were no longer required because The Soulmates were cut back to a four piece outfit.

=== Col Nolan and The Soul Syndicate ===
In 1968, Loughnan joined Col Nolan & The Soul Syndicate, a jazz combo with Col Nolan on organ and piano, John Allan on electric bass, Loughnan playing saxophone and flute, and multi-instrumentalist John Sangster on drums. Combining elements of rock and jazz at a time when jazz fusion wasn't recognised as a separate genre, they were often heard at the Sydney discothèque named the "Whisky a Go Go". Promotional material in the cover notes of Whatever It's Worth tout their music as "just as great for listening as it is for dancing". After releasing Crazy Crotchet in 1966, Whatever It's Worth (1968) was Nolan's second album as a bandleader, and it has become an extremely rare disc in the current era. The band was augmented by Doyle on guitar, Loughnan wrote the first tune, "Shades of McSoul", and sang the vocal on the last track, "By the Time I Get to Phoenix" written by Jimmy Webb.

=== Ayers Rock ===
In October 1973, Loughnan was invited to join a recently formed band, Ayers Rock, by his friend, and former bandmate Doyle. He flew from England to Melbourne to line up with Duncan McGuire bass, Mark Kennedy drums, Ray Burton on guitar and vocals, and Doyle on guitar. Loughnan's family relocated to Melbourne during his time with the band. By December 1973 Ayers Rock had signed with Mushroom Records, and Mushroom co-owner, Michael Gudinski, was their manager. Chris Brown replaced Burton on guitar and vocals four months later.

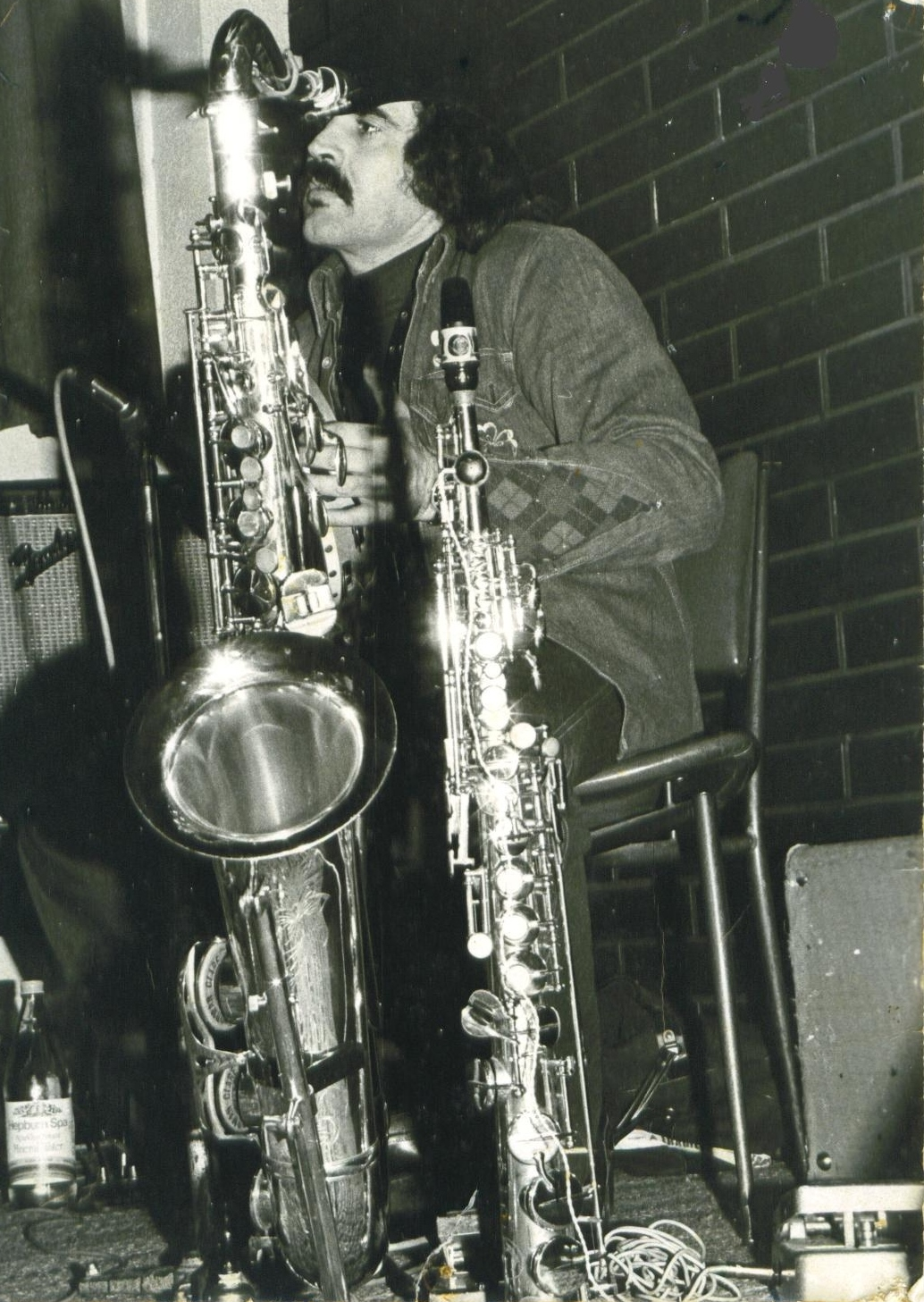
Tenor (left) and soprano saxophones used by Loughnan in 1974

High expectations were placed on Ayers Rock during this formative period. Juke Magazine reported that they were hailed as "potentially the most exciting group ever to come together in this country". Juke also claimed that Ayers Rock were "individually some of the most respected, versatile and experienced musicians on the local circuit".

In an interview with Margaret MacIntyre of Rolling Stone (Australian edition), the group were asked about particular musicians who had influenced them: Loughnan liked Herbie Hancock, Chick Corea, and Weather Report; Brown nominated Carlos Santana, while Doyle favoured Jackson Browne. Kennedy said: "the more people you can listen to the better. The more flexible you are in taste the better, otherwise you fall into limiting your playing to a few feels and that's it". Loughnan believed it was important to see "a country concert, a rock concert, or a symphony or whatever – it's all good music". Early repertoire included Burton's "Rock 'n Roll Fight (Going On)" and "Morning Magic", "Lady Montego" (written by McGuire), and "Nostalgic Blues" by Brown. Paul Gardiner of Rolling Stone observed that the early music of Ayers Rock "was still tied quite closely to existing American styles".

Loughnan wrote two new tunes, "Crazy Boys" and "Big Red Rock", initially for the band's live sets, and eventually for their first album. "Crazy Boys" had a spoken introduction, with Doyle and Loughnan ham-acting as typical people found at an Aussie hamburger joint (counter staff and patron) leading to the song's nickname, "The Hamburger Song". The banter was deliberately comical, and ridiculous. Juke referred to the song as "free form jazz", but, in addition, the use of electronic processing on the vocals, guitars and saxophone gave the music a crazy feel, reminiscent of psychedelic music. It had only two lines of lyrics, and a lengthy duration, leaving plenty of time for solos.

"Big Red Rock" was a long instrumental composition of constantly shifting moods, which wasn't easily categorised into one particular genre, although reviewers referred to it as jazz rock. It started and finished with quiet sections which were eerie and evocative, and featured a long middle section, which gradually built from a soft beginning to a frenetic crescendo before breaking down to a slow, gentle mood again.

Ayers Rock were described as "a real Muso's band", "musician's musicians", and were "widely regarded as among the best musos in the country". Eloe Fanouche of RAM magazine observed that "The audiences in Melbourne – their home-base – are obviously enthusiastic, and tend to follow the group to their different venues". This phenomenon was encouraged by Ayers Rock changing the arrangements and solos, as well as the setlists, so that "It's not the same thing every night, unlike many bands" as Doyle said. (Publication) noted that "It was common to see a group of musicians clustered around the stage, specifically to observe [Kennedy]'s playing". Kennedy said "I never really noticed it".

==== Recording Big Red Rock ====
Negotiations were held in regard to recording the first album with EMI

"but they put so much pressure and so much bullshit on us: they said that we had to use one of their producers and that he had to OK the musical content of the thing, that there was to be no one present except ourselves. It was just going to be so tight and so straight [...] they sent us a telegram like an ultimatum saying if that's not good enough forget it, so after we heard all that we went back to Gudinski". Jimmy Doyle, 1975

There were other problems as well: these conditions were to be specified in a ten-year contract, and the first attempts to record (at Festival studios) left the band deeply unsatisfied with the sound, in that "[the recordings] failed to capture their onstage dynamic aggression".

Ayers Rock put a proposal to Gudinski that they could record the album live-in-the-studio in two days. This was attractive to Gudinski because at that moment his company, Mushroom Records, was critically short of funds. The sessions at Armstrong's (21—22 September 1974) were described as "having a party before an audience with lights, drinks and food". Doyle told Margaret MacIntyre of Rolling Stone: "We depend a lot on audience response [...] and when an audience is really into it, it just makes it so much better and easier to play". The invited audience were friends of the band, and special guests from the music industry. The album, Big Red Rock, was released in Australia and New Zealand in November 1974.

Duncan Kimball of MilesAgo.com stated:

"Big Red Rock was an early critical and commercial success for Mushroom, showcasing the band's considerable prowess and the material was a good balance between the more commercial song-based material of McGuire and Brown and the more adventurous instrumentals".

Those instrumentals were "Crazy Boys" and the title track "Big Red Rock" written by Loughnan, and a cover of "Boogie Woogie Waltz" by Joe Zawinul of Weather Report.

Loughnan started experiencing strong back pain which increased to such an extent that he was forced to quit live performing for two months. Doyle explained: "We really missed Col [...] so we had to readjust some of the tunes [...] It made us play harder 'cos we were missing an instrument". Kennedy described Loughnan's return after surgery as "a real lift". Even after his return, he sat while playing because the pain became too much if he tried to stand for a whole performance. In a colour video of the band performing "Big Red Rock", Loughnan can be seen sitting on the right.

==== A&M contract ====
In December 1974, Gudinski flew to the US with "a stack of Mushroom records" to promote his artists to record company executives, with Ayers Rock the only successful band. Gudinski explained to Tony Wilson of The Sun: "Their album has met with reasonable success here, but when I took it overseas, the reaction was incredible". Jerry Moss, president of A&M Records, was "blown out" by Big Red Rock, and shortly thereafter Ayers Rock were signed to A&M for a two-album contract with an advance of $US 60,000. The deal allowed A&M the right to release the band's albums and singles internationally, while Mushroom retained the Australasian rights. The North American release of Big Red Rock went ahead on 28 February 1975, and the English release in March.

Highly respected US magazines Billboard and Cashbox gave the album positive reviews, with Billboard correctly predicting that it would receive US FM radio airplay.

==== First US tour and recording second album ====
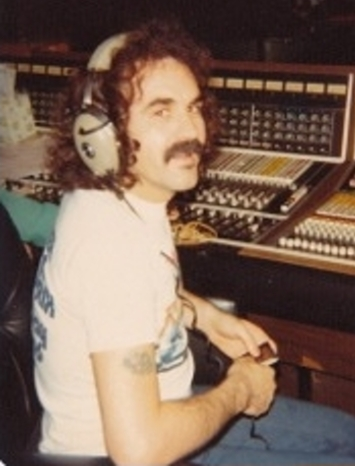
Loughnan at the Record Plant, L.A. in September 1975

Ayers Rock left Australia in July 1975 on their first tour of the US, also including one gig across the Canada–US border in Vancouver. Their A&M connections had secured support billing with international acts like Status Quo, Bachman–Turner Overdrive, the J. Geils Band, and Nils Lofgren, as well as smaller venues on the east and west coasts of America. The biggest support gig was a stadium show in Seattle, Washington on 27 July 1975 in front of 35,000 people. The most unusual gig was when the band were paid not to play as a support for Rod Stewart. Loughnan told The Advertiser: "We got $1000 not to play and the best seats in the house to watch Rod Stewart perform".

During their stay, Ayers Rock recorded their second album at one of the best studios in the world, the Record Plant, L.A. Multi-instrumentalist Stevie Wonder was recording in the next studio, and David Bowie, The Eagles, and Jim Keltner visited the band during the sessions. According to the Sunday Press: "All have been thrilled by the music and have gone out to spread the word about Ayers Rock". Loughnan explained: "Bowie even came twice. He was really impressed with the music we were doing".

On the album, titled Beyond, which was released in Australia and the US in April 1976, Loughnan wrote the title track, "Beyond", as well as "Place to Go", and "Angel in Disguise". In addition, Loughnan wrote arrangements for the band, and the 23 piece orchestra featuring top L.A. musicians, and conducted the orchestra in the studio. The track "Song for Darwin", written by Brown, has an introduction lasting 2min 13sec, composed by Loughnan in his role as arranger. In an interview shortly before Ayers Rock left for America, the band admitted that they had only basic sketches for the music. Ultimately, Loughnan composed most of the arrangements for Beyond while he and the band were on the road in the US.

=== Sydney Conservatorium of Music ===
Loughnan joined the academic staff at the Sydney Conservatorium of Music, University of Sydney in 1978 as a lecturer in saxophone and arranging. Many of Loughnan's students have established professional careers in music, including Dale Barlow, Sandy Evans, Richard Maegraith, Matt Keegan, and Mark Taylor. He has taught at the Conservatorium of Music every year from 1978 to the present.

== Discography ==
=== Solo and duo albums ===
| Year | Artist | Title | Label | Catalogue | Date Recorded |
|---|---|---|---|---|---|
| 1981 | Loughnan and Murphy | Feel The Breeze | Seaside | YRPX 1862 | Sept 1979 – Jul 1981 |
| 2007 | Col Loughnan | Ellen St | Newmarket | NEW3240.2 | Nov 2004 – Jan 2005 |

Feel The Breeze was re-released on CD in 2004 by La Brava Music (LB0060).

=== Albums (selected discography) ===
| Year | Artist | Title | Label | Catalogue | Date Recorded |
|---|---|---|---|---|---|
| 1963 | The Delltones | Come a Little Bit Closer | Leedon | LL-31013 | |
| 1968 | Col Nolan & The Soul Syndicate | Whatever It's Worth | CBS | SBP-233621 | |
| 1970 | Daly-Wilson Big Band | Live! At The Cellblock | Columbia | SCXO-7979 | |
| 1972 | Daly-Wilson Big Band | The Exciting Daly-Wilson Big Band | Festival | SFL-934453 | |
| 1973 | Claude Papesch | Hammond Spectacular | HMV | SOEX-10021 | |
| 1974 | Jim Keays | The Boy From The Stars | EMI | 106335 | |
| 1974 | Billy Green | Stone (Film Soundtrack) | Warner Bros. | 600,002 | |
| 1974 | Ayers Rock | Big Red Rock | Mushroom | L 35354 | Sept 1974 |
| 1975 | Linda George | Step by Step | Image | ILP-750 | |
| 1976 | Ayers Rock | Beyond | Mushroom | L 35707 | Sept 1975 |
| 1979 | Doug Parkinson & The Southern Star Band | I'll Be Around | Southern Star | L 36824 | |
| 1980 | Judy Bailey | Notwithstanding | ABC Jazz | 510600-2 | |
| 1981 | Ricky May | Ricky May | J&B | JB 057 | |
| 1981 | Play School, Kindergarten | Hickory Dickory | ABC | ABCL 8110 | |
| 1982 | John Sangster | Fluteman (Film Soundtrack) | Rain-Forest | RFLP-006 | July 1982 |
| 1983 | David Fennell | Harbour Crossing | Larrikin | LRJ-130 | |
| 1983 | Ricky May with the Julian Lee Orchestra | Fats Enough! | ABC | L 60011/2 | |
| 1983 | Slim Dusty | On The Wallaby | Columbia | SCXO.8045 | |
| 1987 | Tim Finn | The Les Patterson Long Player (Film Soundtrack) | WEA | 254779-1 | |
| 1988 | Electric Chamber Orchestra | Morning (opus one) | WEA | 255667-1 | |
| 1988 | Georgie Fame | No worries | Four Leaf Clover | FLC 5099 | |
| 1989 | Vince Jones & Grace Knight | Come in Spinner | ABC | 838 984-1 | |
| 1991 | Grace Knight | Stormy Weather | Columbia | 4649029 2 | |
| 1994 | Australian Jazz Quintet plus One | Reunion | AEM | AEM 25801-2 | 1993 |
| 1996 | Grace Knight | Grace Knight Live | ABC Jazz | 4835822 | |
| 1997 | Ed Wilson Big Band | Song for Joel | WP | WP CD2 | |
| 2002 | John Leigh Calder | Indigo | La Brava | LB0052 | |
| 2008 | Lisa Michel | Shaken & Stirred | Lyre Bird | 5637375644 | 7—9 April 2008 |
