= Southern Contemporary Rock Assembly =

- Genres: Jazz-rock
- Years active: 1971–1972
- Label: M7, Atlantic
- Past members: Sheryl Black; Ian Bloxsom; Russell Dunlop; Dave Ellis; Greg Foster; Mickey Leyton (a.k.a. Michael Puddyfoot); Jim Kelly; Mike Kenny; Peter Martin; Don Wright; Ian Saxon

Southern Contemporary Rock Assembly or SCRA was an Australian jazz-rock group formed in mid-1971 by Sheryl Black on lead vocals, Ian Bloxsom on percussion, Russell Dunlop on drums (ex-Aesop's Fable, Levi Smith's Clefs), Dave Ellis on bass guitar, Greg Foster on trombone and harmonica (ex-Heart 'n' Soul), Mickey Leyton (a.k.a. Michael Puddyfoot) on lead vocals, Jim Kelly on lead guitar (ex-Affair, Levi Smith's Clefs), Mike Kenny on trumpet (Levi Smith's Clefs), Peter Martin on guitar and vocals (ex-Little Sammy and the in People) and Don Wright on tenor sax and flute (ex-Ram Jam Big Band).

In December 1971 the band issued the debut album, SCRA, which Australian musicologist, Ian McFarlane, compared to their regular "brash, commercial sound" when performing live – the album was "more restrained and slickly arranged." It was produced by Allan Crawford and issued on M7 Records and provided three singles including their debut, "C C Rider", which was a cover version of Ma Rainey's original. In September 1971 they performed it live-in-the-studio for Australian Broadcasting Corporation's TV programme, GTK. Their second single, "Roly Poly", was released in December which peaked at No. 27 on the Go-Set National Top 40, and No. 28 on the Australian Kent Music Report Singles Chart, in April of the following year.

SCRA appeared at the inaugural Sunbury Pop Festival in January 1972 and provided a live version of "Roly Poly" for a double album, Sunbury, by various artists on EMI.and His Master's Voice. John Dixon directed and produced a documentary film of the festival, Sunbury (1972), which includes footage of SCRA's version of "I Just Want to Make Love to You" with Black on lead vocals. McFarlane praised her as a "gutsy blues singer of rare talent." By April the group had relocated to the United States. Ian Saxon joined as their third lead vocalist. Also in April SCRA members appeared as the studio backing band for Dig Richards' country music album, Harlequin.

SCRA recorded their second album, The Ship Album (1972), at The Hit Factory in New York; and at United Sound Studios, Sydney. It was produced by Martin and issued by Atlantic Records. McFarlane felt they had "dispensed with the lighter pop moments of the debut to concentrate on a more innovative and bluesy progressive jazz-rock sound". The group disbanded by the end of that year. Black, Dunlop, Ellis, Foster, Kelly, Kenny and Martin all did session work in subsequent years. Dunlop and Kelly both joined Mother Earth; Dunlop was later a member of Johnny Rocco Band and then Ayers Rock; Bloxsom, Kelly, and Kenny were members of Crossfire.

== Discography ==
=== Studio albums ===
List of studio albums
Title	Album details	Peak chart positions
Title	Album details	AUS KMR
SCRA	Released: November 1971; Label: M7 Records (LW3312); Formats: LP	25
The Ship Album	Released: 1972; Label: Atlantic Records (SD-1007); Formats: LP	—

=== Singles ===
List of singles
Title	Year	Peak chart positions	Album
Title	Year	AUS KMR	Album
"C C Rider"	1971	—	SCRA
"Roly Poly"	1971	35	SCRA
"Sydney Born Man"	1972	—	SCRA
"Our Ship"	1972	—	The Ship Album
"It's a Game"	1972	—	non album single
