= Levi Smith's Clefs =

Australian R&B, pop rock group

- Also known as: The Clefs
- Origin: Adelaide, South Australia, Australia
- Genres: R&B; pop rock
- Years active: 1963–1972
- Label: Sweet Peach
- Past members: see #Members

Levi Smith's Clefs, originally The Clefs, were an Australian R&B, pop rock group, which formed in Adelaide in 1963. Lead vocalist, Barrie "The Bear" McAskill, joined in 1965. In 1967 he took over and renamed the group after founding keyboardist, Winston "Tweed" Harris, left. They released a sole studio album, Empty Monkey, in March 1970 and underwent numerous line-up changes until they disbanded in 1972. After their time in the band various members formed the groups: Tully, Fraternity and Southern Contemporary Rock Assembly (SCRA). Winston Harris (1941–2004) died of throat cancer, aged 63. A drummer from 1970 to 1971, Russell Dunlop (1945–2009), died after a seizure, aged 63. Richard Lockwood, flautist and saxophonist in 1968, died in 2012 of bowel cancer.

== History ==
=== The Clefs ===
The Clefs formed in Adelaide during 1963 as an R&B group by Winston "Tweed" Harris on keyboards. The early line-up included Michael Atkins on drums, Bruce Howe on bass guitar, Dennis Marshall on saxophone, Trevor Pridham on vocals and Les Tanner on guitar. Briefly Pat Aulton joined on co-lead vocals, and he later became a record producer. Australian musicologist, Ian McFarlane, observed, "[they] became an in-demand dance band on the city's thriving club circuit." Barrie McAskill (ex-Fabulous Drifters) replaced Aulton as co-lead vocalist in 1965 with Bev Harrell alongside Harris, Howe, Tanner, Bob Jeffrey on saxophone and Vince Jones on drums (ex-Fabulous Drifters).

Harrell left the group and started her solo career, "[she] was one of the most popular solo singers on the mid-1960s pop scene." The Clefs issued three singles in 1966, "I Can Only Give You Everything", "Last Night" and "A Boy Like Me". In early 1967 Harris quit the Clefs and travelled to Melbourne where he formed an R&B, pop group, the Groove, with Geoff Bridgford (ex-Steve & the Board) on drums, Jamie Byrne (ex-Black Pearls, Running Jumping Standing Still) on bass guitar, Rod Stone (ex-the Librettos, Normie Rowe & the Playboys) on guitar and Peter Williams (ex-Max Merritt & the Meteors) on lead vocals and guitar. They were popular in Australia in the late 1960s, winning the 1968 "Hoadley's Battle Of The Sounds". Their prize was a trip to London, which they used in March 1969.They disbanded in 1971. Harris became a producer-arranger. Harris (1941–2004) died of throat cancer, aged 63.

=== Levi Smith's Clefs ===
After Harris left McAskill assumed leadership and at the suggestion of talent manager, Peter Raphael, they changed their name to Levi Smith's Clefs (a reference to Four Tops' lead singer Levi Stubbs). According to McFarlane, "Scottish-born Barrie McAskill earned a reputation as one of the country's pioneering soul/R&B singers." His size, commanding presence and gravely voice earned him the nickname "The Bear", and he led an ever-changing line-up of Levi Smith's Clefs from 1967 to 1972.

Levi Smith's Clefs played gutsy R&B similar to Max Merritt & the Meteors. The group provided a training ground for young musicians, including later members of: Tully, Fraternity, Southern Contemporary Rock Assembly (SCRA) and Mighty Mouse. McAskill encouraged them to improve their musicianship and to move on when they felt they had outgrown the band – about sixty performers passed through the band's ranks over the years. As a five-piece, Levi Smith's Clefs moved first to Melbourne and then in 1969 to Sydney where they took up an 18-month residency at the Whisky A-Go-Go club in Kings Cross. At that time the city was in an R&R boom, a profitable period for live music, powered by visiting American servicemen, on leave from the Vietnam War.

Some members from this era were Inez Amaya on vocals, Les Stacpool on guitar (ex-Chessmen, Merv Benton & the Tamlas), organists Ian Walsh and Michael Carlos, bassists Doug Stirling, John Blake, John "Yuk" Harrison and John Helman, and drummers Gil Matthews (ex-Max Hamilton & the Impacts) and Jimmy Thompson. Thompson had played in the second incarnation of Tony Worsley & the Fabulous Blue Jays and the Vince Maloney Sect and went on to join the formative "heavy" version of the Aztecs with Lobby Loyde (where he was, coincidentally, replaced by Matthews). Several musicians came and went more than once, and others often sat in, as Canadian-born Michael Carlos recalled in December 2000:

"I arrived in Sydney with my dad in July 1967. Got a gig in an amateur band, the Blues Breakers, the first night I was here, and played with them for about six months. I got a Hammond C3. Soon gave up all pretence about going to university and joined a professional band called Levi Smith’s Clefs. Worked at Whisky A-Go-Go – seven hours a night, six nights a week. It was here that I really learned how to play. The band was an Aussie institution, with members coming and going all the time. Some of the best rock and jazz musicians in the country would join for a while, or sit in for a few nights. I was the youngest and most inexperienced member, and had to learn fast. But nothing beats being surrounded by players that are all better than you."

In 1968 the line-up was McAskill, Amaya, Blake, Carlos, Mick Jurd on guitar, Richard Lockwood on flute and saxophone, and Robert Taylor on drums; however, at the end of the year, all except Jurd left. Blake, Carlos, Lockwood and Taylor formed Tully, a progressive rock group. They became the house band for the Australian stage production of Hair, which premiered in June 1969; Amaya joined the cast as a member of "the tribe". Richard Lockwood died in September 2012, three years after being diagnosed with bowel cancer.

McAskill and Jurd were joined in Levi Smith's Clefs by John Bissett on organ, Tony Buettel on drums (ex-Bay City Union) and Bruce Howe on bass guitar. They toured Australia and recorded the group's sole album, Empty Monkey, released in March 1970 on Jimmie Stewart's Sweet Peach label. It was one of the first local albums to combine soul, R&B, pop and progressive rock. McFarlane noticed, "Despite being a groundbreaking release in many ways, the album failed to take off. The stand out cut was an 11-and-a-half minute arrangement of the Beatles' 'You Can't Do That'." The album provided two singles, "Lisa" (January 1970) and a cover of Junior Walker's "Shotgun" (April).

Early in 1970 the line-up had changed again with Bissett, Buettel, Howe and Jurd leaving to form a rock band, Fraternity. McAskill assembled a new brass-heavy line-up of Levi Smith's Clefs. They took up residency at Chequers nightclub, playing six nights a week for twelve months, and specialised in tracks by Blood, Sweat & Tears, Chicago and Joe Cocker. Under the name Barrie McAskill's Levi Smith's Clefs, the band issued two more singles, their version of Ten Years After's "Love Like a Man" (September 1970), and "Gonna Get a Seizure" (April 1971). The released a four-track split extended play, Best of Whisky A-Go-Go on the short-lived Chart label, which was shared with two tracks by local band, Autumn. (Note: Best of Whisky A-Go-Go four-track split extended play had two tracks by Levi Smith's Clefs: "Down in the Valley", "Lawdy Miss Clawdy"; and two trackds by Sydney-based pop group, Autumn: "Day Tripper", "Midnight Special".) The Levi Smiths Clefs' tracks were "Down in the Valley" and "Lawdy Miss Clawdy".

Many musicians worked in the group through 1970 to 1971, including, the returning Carlos (ex-Tully) and Jeffrey on saxophone, as well as Julie Robinson on vocals (for two gigs), Bruce Howard on organ (ex-the La De Das, the Aztecs), Jim Kelly on guitar (ex-the Affair and later of Crossfire), Kiwi guitarist Billy TK (ex-Human Instinct), Ted "The Head" Yanni on guitar, John "Yuk" Harrison on bass guitar (ex-the Meteors, Genesis), Doug Stirling on bass guitar, Russell Dunlop (ex-Aesop's Fables), Allan Turnbull, Greg Henson (each successively on drums). Dunlop, Kelly and Kenny became the core of jazz-rock group, Southern Contemporary Rock Assembly (SCRA), when they left Levi Smith's Clefs in mid-1971. Dunlop left SCRA after a year to work in various groups and as a session drummer. He died in May 2009 – he had collapsed after playing a drum set at his son's wedding in Sydney – aged 63.

The late 1971 line-up of McAskill, Carlos, Henson, Jeffrey and Stirling, also worked as Barrie McAskill's Bear Brigade or McAskill's Marauders. They toured to Adelaide but folded in early 1972 after Carlos and Henson the Australian production of Jesus Christ Superstar, in Sydney in May 1972. Carlos remained with the production until it closed in 1976. In early 1972 McAskill put together a short-lived group, Barrie McAskill's People, with Michael Barnes on guitar (ex-Nutwood Rug Band), Ken Firth on bass guitar (ex-Tully), Vince Melouney (ex-the Aztecs, Bee Gees, Fanny Adams, Cleves, Flite) on guitar and Kevin Murphy on drums (ex-Wild Cherries, the Aztecs, King Harvest, Chain).

In mid-1972 McAskill relocated to Melbourne and revived the Levi Smith's Clefs name. This first Melbourne line-up was a quartet with Doug Stirling, Kevin Murphy and guitarist Mick Elliott. Elliott was later replaced by Les Stacpool, and McAskill added Ian Clyne on keyboards (ex-the Loved Ones, Ram Jam Big Band). By October 1972 it had changed again, with Clyne, McAskill and Murphy joined by Mal Capewell on saxophone and flute (ex-Dr Kandy's Third Eye, Dada, Company Caine), Russell Smith on trumpet and vocals (ex-Ram Jam Big Band).

McAskill brought in three former members of Chain — Barry "Little Goose" Harvey on drums, Phil Manning on guitar and Barry "Big Goose" Sullivan on bass guitar. Shortly after Capewell, Clyne, Harvey, Manning, Murphy and Sullivan all left to form Mighty Mouse, which subsequently led to a reformation of Chain. Another member, electronic musician Steve Dunstan (ex-18th Century Quartet) had provided the opening and closing 'computer noises' for Company Caine's 1971 album, A Product of a Broken Reality. Levi Smith's Clefs disbanded at the end of 1972.

=== Afterwards ===
Returning to Sydney in January 1973, Barrie McAskill formed an eponymous group, McAskill, with Eddy McDonald on bass guitar, Dallas "Digger" Royall on drums, the erstwhile Doug Stirling on bass guitar and Alvin Tutin on guitar. The following year the group returned to Melbourne, with Royall joined by Ian Mawson on keyboards (ex-Company Caine), Warren Ward on bass guitar (ex-Flying Circus, Blackfeather) and Lindsay Wells on guitar (ex-Healing Force, Chain, Blackfeather). During 1975 the group included Bob Fortesque on bass guitar (ex-Blackfeather), Paul Johnson on drums, Eddie McDonald on bass guitar (ex-Avengers [New Zealand group], Bakery), Roger McLachlan on bass guitar (later in Little River Band), Howie Morgan on keyboards and Jeff Spooner on guitar. That group disbanded in 1976. McAskill returned to Adelaide in 1977 and formed a series of bands, East End Street Band, Barrie McAskill's on Fire, Barrie McAskill and Friends, Barrie McAskill's Soul Survivors, Who Dat Dere, and Topsy and the Bear. In late 1977 he formed Barrie McAskill's God's Warriors & the Amazons with Geoff Spooner on guitar, Paul Johnston, then Lee 'Fred' Cass on drums, Bob Fortescue on bass. In 1978 it changed:Ross Hannaford on guitar, Mal Logan on keyboards and John van Boxtel on drums.

Levi Smith's Clefs reunited for short-term gigs in Melbourne in 2002, 2003 and 2008 and included Barrie's wife, Jan McAskill on vocals and keyboards. An expanded version of Empty Monkey was issued on CD in 2008. According to McFarlane, Barrie McAskill, "is one of Aussie rock's great survivors, first and foremost a dedicated music fan, a champion of soul, R&B and jazz, a band lead par excellence, and at the heart of the matter he is the Levi Smith's Clefs."

== Members ==
- Michael Atkins – drums (1963–65)
- Trevor Pridham – lead vocals (1963)
- Pat Aulton – lead vocals (1963–65)
- Winston "Tweed" Harris – keyboards (1963–67) (died 2004)
- Bruce Howe – bass guitar (1963–67)
- Les Tanner – guitar (1963–67)
- Dennis Marshall – saxophone (1963–67)
- Bev Harrell – lead vocals (1965)
- Vince Jones – drums (1965–72)
- Barrie McAskill – lead vocals (1965–72)
- Inez Amaya – vocals (1967–68)
- John Blake – bass guitar (1967–68)
- Michael Carlos – organ (1967–68, 1971, 1972)
- John "Yuk" Harrison – bass guitar (1967–68, 1971, 1972)
- John Hellman – bass guitar (1967–68)
- Bob Jeffrey – saxophone (1967–68, 1971, 1972)
- Gil Matthews – drums (1967–68)
- Les Stacpool – guitar (1967–68, late 1972)
- Doug Stirling – bass guitar (1967–68, 1969–71, 1972)
- Jimmy Thompson – drums (1967–68)
- Ian Walsh – organ (1967–68)
- Mick Jurd – guitar (1968–69)
- Richard Lockwood – saxophone, flute (1968) (died 2012)
- Robert Taylor – drums (1968)
- John Bissett – organ (1968–69)
- Tony Buettel – drums (1968–69)
- Bruce Howe – bass guitar (1968–69)
- Linda Cable – vocals (1969–71)
- Michael Darby – drums, guitar (1969–71)
- Steve Doran – organ (1969–71)
- John Freeman – drums (1969–70)
- Peter Karlenick – guitar (1969–71)
- Steve Bowden – trumpet) 1970
- Mick Cousins – trombone (1970–71)
- Ken Deakin – vocals (1970–71)
- Bill Harrower – saxophone (1970–71)
- Russell Dunlop – drums (1971) (died 2009)
- Bruce Howard – organ (1971)
- Jim Kelly – guitar (1971)
- Mick Kenny – trumpet (1971)
- Ken Tate – trombone (1971)
- Alan Turnbull – drums (1971)
- Billy TK – guitar (1971)
- Greg Henson – drums (1971, 1972)
- Julie Robinson – vocals (1971, two gigs)
- Ted "The Head" Yanni – guitar (1971)
- Michael Barnes – guitar (1972)
- Ken Firth – bass guitar (1972)
- Vince Melouney – guitar (1972)
- Kevin Murphy – drums (1972)
- Mick Elliott – guitar (1972)
- Mal Capewell – saxophone, flute (late 1972)
- Ian Clyne – keyboards (late 1972)
- Steve Dunstan – guitar (late 1972)
- Barry Harvey – drums (late 1972)
- Phil Manning – guitar (late 1972)
- Barry Sullivan – bass guitar (late 1972)

== Discography ==
=== Albums ===
- Empty Monkey (March 1970) – Sweet Peach (SPB 504)

=== Extended plays ===
- Best of the Whisky A-Go-Go (split EP shared with two tracks by Autumn, 1970)

=== Singles ===
- "Road Runner" (1969) Sweet Peach - AUS #84
- "Lisa" (January 1970) – Sweet Peach (SP 011)
- "Shotgun" (April 1970) – Sweet Peach (SP 021)
- "Take Another Little Piece of My Heart" (1970)
- "Love Like a Man" (1970) – Chart Records (PR 202)
- "Dancing and Drinking" (1971)
