= Leo de Castro =

New Zealand funk and soul singer-guitarist (c.1948–2019)

- Born: Kiwi Leo de Castro Kino ca. 1948; Benneydale, King Country, North Island, New Zealand
- Origin: Auckland, New Zealand
- Died: 3 March 2019 (aged 70) Auckland
- Genres: Funk, soul, country, rock, blues, progressive rock
- Occupation: Singer
- Instruments: Vocals, guitar
- Years active: 1968–2008
- Label: Big Beat

Leo de Castro (born Kiwi Leo de Castro Kino; c. 1948 – 3 March 2019) was a New Zealand funk and soul singer-guitarist. From 1969 to 1995 he worked in Australia in a variety of bands before returning to Auckland. He contributed to "summer jam" (1973) as a solo artist alongside Lobby Loyde and the Coloured Balls and Billy Thorpe, Rocco (1976), as a member of Johnny Rocco Band; Voodoo Soul – Live at The Basement (October 1987), by Leo de Castro and Friends; a live album, Long White Clouds (2007), which had been recorded in January 1988 using two separate backing bands, The Dancehall Racketeers and Roger Janes Band.

De Castro's vocals feature on the singles "Wichita Lineman" (January 1971) by King Harvest, "Heading in the Right Direction" (August 1975) by Johnny Rocco Band, "Suspicious Minds" (June 1979) by Leo de Castro and Babylon. Australian musicologist, Ian McFarlane, described him as a "permanent fixture of the pub/concert/festival circuit and was praised for his vocal abilities" as "one of the best soul singers working in Australia" during the 1970s. From 1995 de Castro was performing in and around Hobart. His farewell gig in 2008 was recorded and filmed live at the Republic Bar. Leo and the Warriors featured some of Tassie finest musicians including fellow Kiwi the late great guitarist/vocalist Joe Pirere. Later in 2008 he moved back to New Zealand to retire.

== Early career ==
Leo de Castro was born as Kiwi Leo de Castro Kino in Benneydale, King Country, New Zealand. He was named after the doctor who delivered him. In 1966, with his family, he moved to Auckland where he started his career in the local club scene. During 1968, for six months, he was the lead singer of Dallas Four and was noted to have a "soul style about his singing".

De Castro relocated to Sydney in 1969 and joined The Browns, alongside Ray Arnott on drums (ex-Chelsea Set), Ronnie Peel on bass guitar (The Missing Links, The Pleazers, Rockwell T. James and the Rhythm Aces, the La De Da's) and Les Stacpool on guitar (Chessmen, Merv Benton and the Tamlas). The Browns also backed Bernadette O'Neill, another singer, and were alternately billed as Leo and The Browns or Bernadette and The Browns. Later that year, De Castro formed Leo and Friends with John Capek on piano, Rob MacKenzie on guitar (MacKenzie Theory), Kevin Murphy on drums (ex-Wild Cherries) and Jeremy Noone on saxophone (Sons of the Vegetal Mother). The group disbanded early in the following year.

During that time he stayed briefly with Melbourne rock promoter Michael Browning, who would go on to manage AC/DC. Browning wrote in his memoirs that de Castro was "probably the most electrifying vocalist I've ever heard", but also noted his erratic behaviour. De Castro also appeared at the 1970 Ourimbah "Pilgrimage for Pop", Australia's first rock festival, and was included in the 2012 film Once Around the Sun, a psychedelic movie about the event.

== King Harvest ==
In September 1970 de Castro, on vocals and guitar, formed King Harvest as a progressive rock group with Jimmy Doyle on guitar (Silhouettes, Aesop's Fables, Moonstone), Mark Kennedy on drums (Spectrum), Duncan McGuire on bass guitar (Phantoms, Epics, Questions, Doug Parkinson in Focus, Rush) and Steve Yates on keyboards (Rush, Expression). Billy Green on guitar (Doug Parkinson in Focus) replaced Doyle; Green, in turn, was replaced by MacKenzie, and then by Ray Oliver (The Light). In January 1971 King Harvest issued a cover version of "Wichita Lineman", which peaked at No. 35 on Go-Set's National Top 60. The producer was Ian "Molly" Meldrum, a Go-Set journalist; and the single was issued by RCA. Australian musicologist, Ian McFarlane, felt their version of "Wichita Lineman" was an "enthralling arrangement ... highlighted by De Castro's soulful vocals and Green's haunting wah wah guitar lines."

By March 1971 Kennedy and McGuire had left King Harvest to rejoin Green in Doug Parkinson in Focus. They were replaced by Murphy (now, ex-Rush, Billy Thorpe and the Aztecs) on drums and Gary Clarke on bass guitar. Oliver also left in that month and was replaced on guitar by John Williams (Rebels). This line-up issued a cover version of "Jumping Jack Flash" in April with Meldrum producing, but it did not chart. McFarlane noted it was a "potent, six-minute rave-up fired by blazing guitars and crashing drums." The group broke up in September and de Castro formed a briefly existing band, Flite, with Capek on piano (by then ex-Carson), Barry Harvey on drums (Thursday's Children, Wild Cherries, Chain, King Harvest), Vince Melouney on guitar (Billy Thorpe and the Aztecs, Bee Gees, Fanny Adams, Cleves) and Barry Sullivan on bass (Thursday's Children, Wild Cherries, Chain, Carson).

== Leo de Castro and Friends ==
In December 1971 de Castro formed Leo de Castro and Friends, also billed as Friends, as a progressive rock group in Melbourne. He was joined by former bandmates Kennedy, MacKenzie and McGuire; and new associates Tim Martin on saxophone and flute, and Charlie Tumahai on vocals and percussion (Healing Force, Chain). MacKenzie left early in the following year with Phil Manning of Chain filling-in until April when both Green and Oliver joined on guitar. Friends had appeared at the inaugural Sunbury Pop Festival in January 1972.

In August 1972 Friends released a single, "B-B-Boogie", which Duncan Kimball of MilesAgo website felt was a "solid boogie-rock number highlighted by Green and Oliver's dexterous dual guitar work." McFarlane described it as "exceptional hard rock". The track was co-written by de Castro, Kennedy, McGuire and Tumahai. Kimball preferred the B-side, "Freedom Train", which he opined was a "driving, prog-jazz" track that "became their signature tune", it was "one of the best Australian progressive recordings of the '70s." McFarlane noticed that it was a "jubilant jazz-tinged" work.

Tumahai returned to Healing Force in January 1973 and, late that month, Friends appeared at the Sunbury Pop Festival as a six-piece – de Castro, Green, Kennedy, Martin, McGuire and Oliver. Three of their performances "Lucille", "Bird on a Wire" and "La La Song", were recorded for a live 3× LP album, Sunbury 1973 – The Great Australian Rock Festival (April) by various artists on Mushroom Records. A six-track extended play was also issued with one track by Friends. On stage at Sunbury de Castro joined Lobby Loyde and the Coloured Balls, and Billy Thorpe for an early morning session. Their track, "Help Me" / "Rock Me Baby", was issued on a live album, Summer Jam (November 1973), by the Coloured Balls on the Havoc label.

The studio version of "Lucille" was issued as a single by Friends in February 1973 on Mushroom Records. Soon after Green, Martin and Oliver left and, in April, Ray Burton joined on guitar (Delltones, Executives). In June a four-piece line-up of de Castro, Burton, Kennedy and McGuire performed "Freedom Train" and McGuire's newly written track, "Lady Montego", at one of the final concerts at The Garrison venue. The tracks were issued on the live album, Garrison: The Final Blow, Unit 1, by various artists on Mushroom Records.

In June Leo de Castro and Friends disbanded when Burton, McGuire & Kennedy all left to form an eponymous trio. The trio added Doyle in August and became Ayers Rock, a jazz fusion, progressive rock group, by September. That group's lead single was a cover version of "Lady Montego", which also appeared on their debut album, Big Red Rock (November 1974).

De Castro established the New King Harvest in mid-1973 with Ben Kaika on bass guitar (McPhee, Tramp), Tui Richards on guitar, Steve Webb on drums (Blackfeather, Duck, Tramp) and Lindsay Wells on guitar (Healing Force, One Ton Gypsy, Blackfeather). By the end of that year he formed the eponymous group, De Castro. They played "a mix of funk, soul, rock and blues" and were composed of de Castro on vocals and guitar, with Webb on drums joined by Rob Grey on keyboards, Ian Winter on guitar (Carson, Daddy Cool) and John Young on bass guitar.

== Johnny Rocco Band ==
Late in 1974 de Castro, on vocals, joined the Sydney-based group, Johnny Rocco Band, alongside Tony Buchanan on saxophone (Thunderbirds, Daly-Wilson Big Band), Russell Dunlop on drums (Aesop's Fables, Levi Smith's Clefs, Mother Earth), Tim Partridge on bass guitar (Clockwork Oringe, King Harvest, Island, Mighty Kong), Harris Campbell from Arapae, Te Kuiti on guitar and vocals, and Mark Punch on guitar and vocals (Mother Earth). They were "one of the first Australian bands to incorporate funk and soul into the pub-rock forum". In August 1975 they issued a single, "Heading in the Right Direction", which was covered by Renée Geyer after Punch had joined her backing band.

In January 1976 Johnny Rocco Band released their debut album, Rocco, on the Ritz Gramophone label, distributed by Festival Records. Tony Catterall of The Canberra Times compared it with American singer, Felix Cavaliere"s second solo album, Destiny (1975). Catterall felt that "while Cavaliere is just as powerful as the Rocco Band's Leo de Castro, he's much sweeter. And his own falsetto, plus the use of female back-up singers, points up the limitations of de Castro's voice." In August that year Catterall previewed a gig by Johnny Rocco Band as "definitely one of the hottest hot-soul bands in the country, featuring the downright "baaaad" voice of Leo de Castro, a legend amongst those who know."

Johnny Rocco Band toured the United States east coast in 1976 to promote their album, "[finding] little success, the band broke up". Over the next few years de Castro formed a variety of groups: Cahoots (1976), Leo de Castro and Rocco (from May 1977), Leo de Castro Band, Heavy Division (1978) and Leo de Castro and Babylon from December 1978. That group issued a cover version of "Suspicious Minds" in June 1979.

== Later life ==
From the early 1980s de Castro had relocated to Tasmania, "where he leads a small-time pub band." In October 1987 he reassembled Leo de Castro and Friends to perform at the Sydney venue, The Basement. He used the line-up of Doyle, Kennedy and Punch, together with Jason Brewer on saxophone, Dave Green on bass guitar and backing vocals, Sally King on guest vocals, Jason McDermid on trumpet, Dave McRae on piano and Andy Thompson on saxophone. They recorded a cassette, Voodoo Soul – Live at The Basement, which was produced by McGuire and David Cafe and issued late that year. It appeared as a CD in 2010 by Big Beat Music.

During 1988 de Castro recorded live-in-the-studio for an album, Long White Clouds, using two disparate backing groups, Roger Janes Band and The Dancehall Racketeers. It was engineered by McGuire and produced by Cafe at Paradise Studios and Rich Music Studios and was released on CD in 2007. McGuire died of a brain tumour in July 1989. In 1995 de Castro returned to Auckland and reconnected with former bandmate, Tumahai, with a view to record together. Tumahai had a heart attack and died in December 1995.

In 1999 McFarlane described de Castro as a "permanent fixture of the pub/concert/festival circuit and was praised for his vocal abilities" as "one of the best soul singers working in Australia" during the 1970s. In a seachange mood, to further demonstrate the diversity of his musical palette, Leo de Castro and the Cuban Heels were formed in Hobart in late 1989, with Steve 'Keys' Grahame on piano/keyboards, Marcus "Piz" Pizzolato (ex Mary Lou and the Brokenhearted) on lead guitar, Mick 'Moonie' McCallum (ex Rainbow Stew) on pedal steel, Simon Gethen (ex Albino Spade/Tim Brewster and the Blues Roosters) on bass, and Dennis Matthews (ex Sydney Clubs/Mary Lou and the Brokenhearted) on drums. This seasoned troupe performed soulful renditions of country songs by George Jones, Hank Williams, Merle Haggard, Gram Parsons and The Flying Burrito Brothers, among many other classic country music greats. In September 2008 de Castro was farewelled from Hobart by Sarah Shofield on "Leo de Castro and Dutch Tilders" episode of ABC Tasmania's radio show, Breakfast with Robbie Buck. Dutch Tilders, a blues musician, accompanied de Castro. Shofield described de Castro, "[he's] not a well man, so the siren song of home and family is calling him away from Tasmania after more than 20 years of playing music here."

In October 2010, de Castro featured on "Episode 5: Leo de Castro 'Soulman' & Sonny Day 'Bluesman'" on the Māori Television inaugural series, Unsung Heroes of Māori Music. In February 2012 Radio New Zealand National's Musical Chairs aired a two-part episode, "Leo de Castro – The Elusive Legend". The reporter, Keith Newman, interviewed de Castro, Ray Oliver (bandmate), Bob Burns (promoter) and Evan Silva (soul singer).

De Castro died in Auckland on 3 March 2019.
