= Duncan McGuire (musician) =

Australian musician (1943–1989)

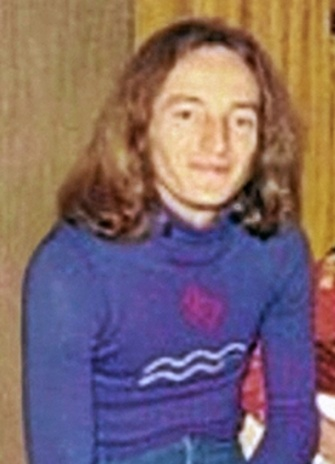
- McGuire at the Record Plant, Los Angeles in 1975

Background information
- Born: Duncan Hazlett McGuire ca. 1943; Sydney, New South Wales, Australia
- Died: 10 July 1989 (aged 46) Sydney, New South Wales, Australia
- Occupations: Musician, songwriter, audio engineer, record producer
- Years active: 1959–1989

Duncan Hazlett McGuire (ca. 1943 – 10 July 1989), was an Australian musician, songwriter, recording engineer and producer. McGuire was a founding member of the jazz fusion band Ayers Rock from 1973 until he left in 1976. As a bass guitarist, he appeared in several of Doug Parkinson's groups, including the Questions (1965–1968), Doug Parkinson in Focus (1968–1969) and the Southern Star Band (1978–1981). He went into music production in the early 1980s; in October 1980, he co-produced and engineered the debut self-titled album by Australian rock band INXS. Duncan McGuire was diagnosed with lung cancer, and he died in July 1989 of an associated brain tumour, aged 46.

== Early life and career ==
McGuire was born about 1943, to Constance (née Fleming) (1920–1961) and Philip Joseph McGuire (1904–1974), a former World War II army officer. McGuire's music career began in 1959 with his first band, the Phantoms, in Sydney. By 1963, on bass guitar, he had joined, Roland Storm and the Statesmen, which included Storm on lead vocals, Mike Allen on drums, Peter Maxworthy on lead guitar, and Mark Rigney on drums. They recorded two singles, "It's the Stomp" (1963) and "The Swingaroo" (1964) for His Master's Voice. Without Storm, the Statesmen also recorded two of their own singles for His Master's Voice, "Beach Comber" (1963) and "Slow Stompin'" (1964).

In 1964, band member Rigney left the Statesmen and Billy Green (a.k.a. Wil Greenstreet) joined on guitar. The group became Roland Storm and the Epics, which recorded a single, "Zip a Dee Doo Dah" (1964), and then became simply the Epics upon Storm leaving. The Epics issued their own singles, "Caravan" (September 1964) and "Too Late" (June 1965). As a member of the Statesmen and of the Epics, McGuire backed Little Pattie live, on her early singles and first album, as well as backing other artists including Reg Lindsay, Johnny Ashcroft, Bryan Davies, Jay Justin and Johnny O'Keefe.

== With Doug Parkinson ==
From late 1965 to 1968 McGuire was the bass guitarist, alongside Green on guitar, in the Questions, which were a "musically substantial bunch" and they released their debut album, What Is a Question?, in October 1966. Australian musicologist, Ian McFarlane, described it as containing "sub-Herb Alpert pastiches [which] failed to chart." Early in 1967 Doug Parkinson joined on lead vocals, it was his first major band, the line up also included Ray Burton on guitar and Doug Lavery on drums – both later joined the Valentines and Axiom – and Rory Thomas on Hammond organ.

The Questions entered the 1967 Hoadley's Battle of the Sounds and won the New South Wales state final, they competed in Melbourne for the Australian final finishing second to the Groop. McFarlane described the Questions' first three singles with Parkinson as "minor psychedelic pop classics": "Sally Go Round the Roses" (July 1967), "And Things Unsaid" (October) and "Something Wonderful" (February 1968). By January 1968 McGuire and Green had left the group.

In March 1968 McGuire and Green returned to work with Parkinson for another group, Doug Parkinson in Focus, which included Lavery and Thomas. That group also won the New South Wales state final of the Hoadley's Battle of the Sounds, and finished third nationally: behind the Groove and the Masters Apprentices. McGuire, as a member of Doug Parkinson in Focus, shifted to Melbourne where they "were perfectly in sync with the tempo of the times ... [they] became one of the most popular outfits on the Melbourne suburban dance / inner-city discotheque circuit." In May 1969 they issued a cover version of the Beatles' track, "Dear Prudence", which reached No. 5 on the Go-Set National Top 40 singles chart.

Doug Parkinson in Focus, with McGuire aboard, entered the 1969 Hoadley's Battle of the Sounds as a Melbourne-based band. They won both the Victorian state and the national grand finals, both held at the Festival Hall, Melbourne. However, in November 1969, McGuire left Parkinson to form a new group, Rush, with Malcolm McGee on lead vocals (ex-Wild Cherries, Python Lee Jackson, Virgil Brothers), Kevin Murphy on drums (ex-Wild Cherries), and Steve Yates on keyboards. By February the following year Rush had disbanded and both McGuire and Green rejoined Parkinson until June.

== King Harvest to Leo de Castro and Friends ==
In September 1970 McGuire was a founding member of a progressive rock band King Harvest, with Leo de Castro on lead vocals and lead guitar (ex-Leo and the Browns, Leo and Friends); Jimmy Doyle on guitar (Silhouettes, Aesop's Fables, Moonstone); Mark Kennedy on drums (Spectrum); and Steve Yates on keyboards (ex-Rush, Expression). They performed cover versions of contemporary hits, including Jimmy Webb's "Wichita Lineman" and The Rolling Stones' "Jumping Jack Flash", which appeared as singles in 1971 on Festival Records. He rejoined Parkinson for a few months before teaming with de Castro in Friends, another progressive rock group, by December that year. Also in Friends were Kennedy, with Charlie Tumahai on vocals and percussion (Aesop's Fables, Healing Force, Chain) and Tim Martin on saxophone and flute.

By April 1972, Green had joined Friends on guitar and the group released their debut single, "B-B-Boogie", in August. The group performed at the Sunbury Pop Festival of 1973 in January and provided two tracks, "Bird on the Wire" and "La La Song", for the live album, Sunbury 1973 - The Great Australian Rock Festival. By April that year Friends line up of McGuire, de Castro, Kennedy and Burton on guitar, had recorded versions of "Lady Montego" and "Freedom Train" for the Various Artists' album, Garrison the Final Blow Unit I (June 1973). McGuire wrote "Lady Montego".

== Ayers Rock, Windchase and the Southern Star Band ==
In June 1973, with two bandmates from Friends, he formed Burton McGuire Kennedy, as a jazz fusion trio. In August they were renamed as Ayers Rock when Jimmy Doyle (ex-King Harvest guitarist, vocalist) joined. In October they recruited Col Loughnan on saxophone, flute, vocals, and piano (the Crescents, the Delltones, Kala) and by December they issued their debut single, "Rock'n'Roll Fight (Going On)", on Mushroom Records. Burton was replaced by Chris Brown (ex-Python Lee Jackson, Kala) on guitar and vocals in March 1974. The group released their debut album, Big Red Rock, in November, which peaked at No. 32 on the Australian Kent Music Report Albums Chart. McGuire had written three tracks for the album, including a re-worked version of "Lady Montego" (1974), which was also their next single. At this time, journalists referred to McGuire's nickname as "The Wizard". Tony Catterall of The Canberra Times caught their performance in October 1975 as they previewed material for a subsequent album, which "showed an improvement" over their previous work and noted that "McGuire's bass was always rock-solid but ready to fly at a moment's notice".

McGuire remained with Ayers Rock until August 1976 leaving after their second album, Beyond (April), and their second tour of the United States (June–July). McGuire was replaced by John Young on bass guitar. In January 1977 McGuire briefly joined Windchase with Mario Millo on lead guitar, mandolin, and lead vocals; and Toivo Pilt on keyboards and guitar (both ex-Sebastian Hardie); and Doug Bligh on drums. As a member Windchase, McGuire helped to finish their debut album, Symphinity, which was issued in June; however he had already left before it appeared. From 1977 to 1980 McGuire joined Parkinson and Kennedy in the Southern Star Band which also had Tommy Emmanuel on guitar and Frank Esler-Smith on keyboards. Other occasional members of the Southern Star Band were Frank Jim Gannon, and Keith Kirwan.

== Production and INXS ==
In the late 1970s, McGuire turned to production work, he was the mixer, engineer and co-producer of INXS, the debut album by the Australian rock band of the same name, which was released on 13 October 1980. It had been recorded from late 1979 to mid-1980 in midnight to dawn recording sessions at Trafalgar Studios, Annandale. Due to the late sessions, McGuire was often found, "slumped exhausted over the mixing panel." The album provided the single, "Just Keep Walking", in September 1980. Australian music journalist, Ed Nimmervoll, described it as the "first significant INXS landmark."

In January 1988 McGuire engineered an album, Long White Clouds, by former band mate de Castro, who used two different backing bands: the Dancehall Racketeers and Roger Janes Band. McGuire worked at the Rich Music Studios in Sydney, the album was eventually released in 2007 by Big Beat Music. Early in 1989 McGuire and David Cafe co-produced an album, Crazy, by Roger Janes Band, which was issued in 2006. Duncan McGuire died on 10 July 1989, aged 46, from a brain tumour, he had been previously diagnosed with lung cancer.

== Awards and nominations ==
=== Go-Set Pop Poll ===
The Go-Set Pop Poll was coordinated by teen-oriented pop music newspaper Go-Set and was established in February 1966 and conducted an annual poll during 1966 to 1972 of its readers to determine the most popular personalities.

Year	Nominee / work	Award	Result
1971	himself	Best Bass Guitarist	5th
