= Jimmy Doyle (musician) =

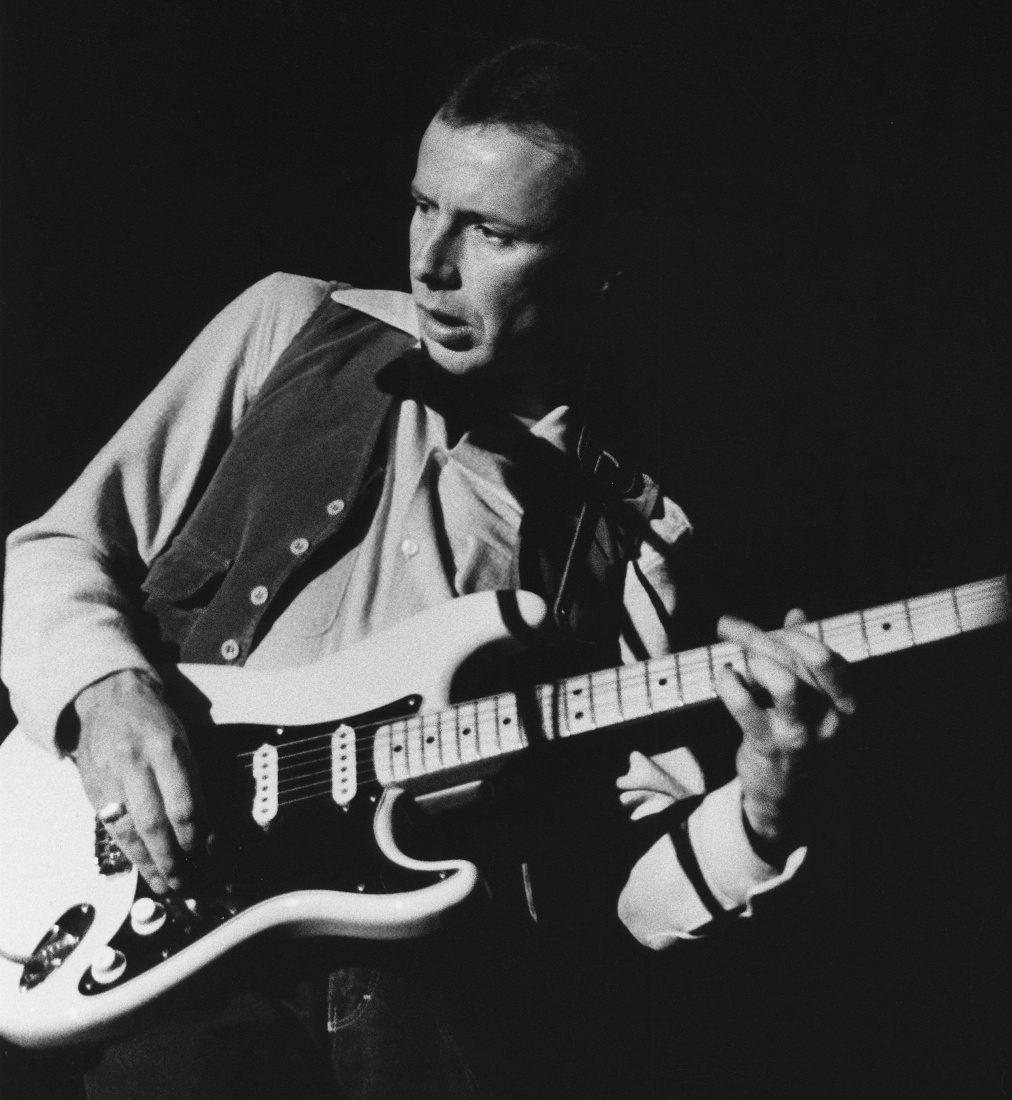
- Doyle performing with Ayers Rock in 1981

Background information
- Born: James Vivian Alfred Doyle; 14 October 1945; Sydney, New South Wales, Australia
- Died: 5 May 2006 (aged 60) Sydney, New South Wales, Australia
- Genres: Blues, pop, rock, jazz rock fusion
- Occupations: Musician, radio presenter, songwriter
- Instrument: Guitar
- Years active: 1960–2006
- Labels: Mushroom, A&M

James Vivian Alfred Doyle (14 October 1945 – 5 May 2006) was an Australian musician, radio presenter and songwriter. He was the founding mainstay guitarist in Ayers Rock (1973–81), a jazz fusion, progressive rock band. As a member of Ayers Rock, Doyle appeared on all three of their studio albums, Big Red Rock (1974), Beyond (1976) and Hotspell (1980). They toured both nationally and internationally including through the United States, where they supported Bachman–Turner Overdrive (July 1975) at a stadium concert with an audience of 35,000 people in Seattle. For the group's third album, Hotspell, Doyle wrote or co-wrote four tracks.

== Biography ==
Doyle's musical career began at the age of 15, spanned 45 years, and covered a wide range of music from blues to pop rock to jazz. He was musical director and guitarist for Winifred Atwell, for two years, and a member of the backing bands for the Delltones, and Dig Richards. Doyle was a member of the Soulmates (1967), Col Nolan and the Soul Syndicate, Aesop's Fables (1968–69), and Moonstone (1970). Aesop's Fables had formed in 1968 in Sydney as a pop vocal group with Doyle on guitar (ex-Telstars), Sheryl Blake on lead vocals, Russell Dunlop on drums, Michael Lawler on bass guitar and Gary Moberly on organ (ex-Ramrods, later worked with Bee Gees).

In September 1970 King Harvest were formed as a progressive rock group with Doyle on guitar, Leo de Castro, on vocals and guitar, Mark Kennedy on drums (ex-Spectrum), Duncan McGuire on bass guitar (ex-Phantoms, Epics, Questions, Doug Parkinson in Focus, Rush) and Steve Yates on keyboards (Rush, Expression). Doyle was soon replaced by Billy Green (ex-Doug Parkinson in Focus).

Doyle was the founding mainstay guitarist of Ayers Rock, a jazz fusion, progressive rock band, which formed in August 1973 in Melbourne. Over the following years other members included Burton, Kennedy, McGuire, Col Loughnan (on trumpet), Chris Brown, Andy Cowan and Dunlop. The group released three studio albums, Big Red Rock (November 1974), Beyond (February 1975) and Hotspell (May 1980) before disbanding in 1981. For the group's final album Doyle wrote or co-wrote four tracks.

Leon Isackson, in his book Behind the Rock and Beyond (2010), recalled that "Jim was a young 'Humphrey Bogart look-alike' with an excellent style on Gibson guitar. His suave appearance ... earned him the salubrious nickname of 'Diamond Jim'". Elvin Bishop, a United States blues musician, was backed by Doyle during Bishop's first tour of Australia in 1986, "Jimmy Doyle is a hell of a guitar player — I love him". Later in that decade, touring English jazz singer and keyboardist, Georgie Fame, invited Doyle to join the Aussie Blue Flames, which were Fame's backing band on his Australian tours. Doyle later presented a regular radio program, In the Deep with Jim, on North Shore's FM99.3 (2NSB), a community radio station in Sydney.

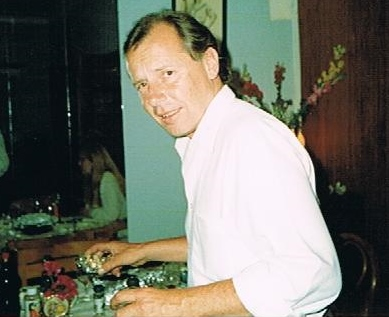
Doyle, the founding mainstay member of Ayers Rock (1973–81), taken in 1990

=== Death ===
Jimmy Doyle was diagnosed with liver cancer and died on 5 May 2006, at the Prince of Wales Hospital, Sydney. A tribute concert in his honour, on 26 May, raised money for his family. Musicians performing included Billy Field, Col Loughnan (ex-Ayers Rock) and Mother Earth featuring lead vocals by Renée Geyer.
