= Sunday Press =

The Sunday Press was a weekend tabloid newspaper printed in Melbourne, Victoria, Australia from 1973 until 1989. It was Melbourne's second Sunday newspaper, the first being the Melbourne Observer. The publisher was The Herald and Weekly Times
