= Night Prowler (song) =

Song by AC/DC

from the album Highway to Hell
- Released: 27 July 1979
- Recorded: March – April 1979
- Studio: Roundhouse (London)
- Genre: Hard rock
- Length: 6:16
- Label: Albert; Atlantic
- Songwriters: Angus Young; Malcolm Young; Bon Scott
- Producer: Robert "Mutt" Lange

Highway to Hell track listing
- 10 tracks Side one: 1. "Highway to Hell"; 2. "Girls Got Rhythm"; 3. "Walk All Over You"; 4. "Touch Too Much"; 5. "Beating Around the Bush"; Side two: 6. "Shot Down in Flames"; 7. "Get It Hot"; 8. "If You Want Blood (You've Got It)"; 9. "Love Hungry Man"; 10. "Night Prowler"

"Night Prowler" is the final track on the 1979 AC/DC album Highway to Hell. It is notable among other AC/DC songs for its slow rhythm, ominous lyrics, and controversy stemming from its association with the mid-1980s Richard Ramirez serial killings.

== Production ==
"Night Prowler" is a hard rock song. It begins with two deep breaths being taken in quick succession, intended to create a tone of "fear and loathing". The song ends with lead singer Bon Scott muttering, "Shazbot! Nanu nanu!", the catchphrase used by Robin Williams on the popular sitcom Mork and Mindy.

== "Night Stalker" controversy ==
In June 1985, a highly publicized murder case began revolving around Richard Ramirez, who was responsible for more than 15 brutal murders as well as rapes and attempted murders in Los Angeles. Nicknamed the "Night Stalker", Ramírez was a fan of AC/DC, particularly the song "Night Prowler". Police also claimed that Ramírez was wearing an AC/DC shirt and left an AC/DC hat at one of his crime scenes. During the trial, Ramírez shouted "Hail Satan!" and showed off the pentagram carved into his palm. The incident brought extremely bad publicity to the band, whose concerts and albums were suddenly campaigned against by parents in Los Angeles County. On VH1's Behind the Music on AC/DC, the band claimed that while the song had taken on a murderous connotation by Ramírez, it is actually about a boy sneaking into his girlfriend's bedroom at night.

== Personnel ==
- Bon Scott – lead vocals
- Angus Young – lead guitar
- Malcolm Young – rhythm guitar, backing vocals
- Cliff Williams – bass guitar, backing vocals
- Phil Rudd – drums
