= Livestock (disambiguation) =

Livestock is one or more domesticated animals raised in an agricultural setting.

Livestock may also refer to:

- Livestock (Brand X album), 1977
- Livestock (Fraternity album), 1971
- Livestock (film), a 2009 American independent horror film
- Livestock (rapper), a rapper and hip-hop artist from Guelph, Ontario
- Al-An'am, "Livestock", sixth chapter of the Qur'an
