= Seasons of Change – The Complete Recordings 1970–1974 =

Box set by Fraternity
- Released: 2021
- Recorded: 1970–74
- Genre: Progressive rock Boogie rock Blues rock Folk rock
- Label: Cherry Red/Lemon Recordings
- Producer: Victor Marshall; Hamish Henry; Fraternity; Grape Organisation

Seasons of Change – The Complete Recordings 1970–1974 is a 3-CD box set collection of Australian band Fraternity, featuring Bon Scott on lead vocals. Released in 2021 by Cherry Red Records, this compilation includes the Fraternity albums, plus several unreleased recordings, alternate versions and rarities. This set includes the long-lost Fraternity recordings which were held by their manager Hamish Henry and uncovered by music historian and promoter Victor Marshall. The album's title references "Seasons of Change", Fraternity's second single from March 1971, which was their most popular track during the 1970s and is a cover of fellow Australian rock band, Blackfeather album track.

== Critical reception ==
Professional ratings
Review scores
Source	Rating
AllMusic	3.5/5 stars
Louder	3.5/5 stars

== Track list ==
CD 1

1. Livestock (3:39)
2. Somerville (4:22)
3. Raglan's Folly (6:02)
4. Cool Spot (4:53)
5. Grand Canyon Suites (4:53)
6. Jupiter's Landscape (2:47)
7. You Have a God (2:27)
8. It (8:28)
9. Why Did It Have to Be Me (2:39)
10. Question (3:37) (Moody Blues cover)
11. Seasons of Change (single version) (3:36) (Blackfeather cover)
12. Somerville (single version) (3:49)
13. The Race (pt 1) (2:56) (Doug Ashdown cover)
14. The Race (pt 2) (4:12) (Doug Ashdown cover)

CD 2

1. Welfare Boogie (3:41)
2. Annabelle (3:57)
3. Seasons of Change (album version) (3:53) (Blackfeather cover)
4. If You Got It (4:04)
5. You Have a God (alternate version) (3:10)
6. Hemming's Farm (3:48)
7. Raglan's Folly (alternate version) (4:41)
8. Getting Off (3:23)
9. Somerville R.I.P. (3:52)
10. Canyon Suite (7:28)
11. The Shape I'm In (3:38) (The Band cover)
12. If You Got It (single version) (3:52)
13. Raglan's Folly (single version) (3:54)
14. You Have a God (single version) (2:01)
15. Seasons of Change (Hoadley's Battle of the Sounds, live 1971) (2:39)
16. If You Got It (Hoadley's Battle of the Sounds, live 1971) (2:00)

CD 3

1. Second Chance (3:18)
2. Tiger (2:30)
3. Going Down (5:00) (Moloch cover)
4. Requiem (4:51)
5. Patch of Land (3:29)
6. Cool Spot (alternate version) (6:00)
7. Hogwash (5:34)
8. Chest Fever (6:20) (The Band cover)
9. Little Queenie (4:57) (Chuck Berry cover)
10. The Memory (3:59)
11. Just Another Whistle Stop (4:09) (The Band cover)
12. No Particular Place to Go (8:26) (Chuck Berry cover)
13. Livestock (2:36) (Vince Lovegrove with Fraternity, 1971)
14. Rented Room Blues (2:13) (Vince Lovegrove with Fraternity, 1971)
15. Get Myself Out of This Place (a.k.a. Getting Off) (3:20) (Vince Lovegrove with Fraternity, 1972)
16. That's Alright Momma (3:33) (Vince Lovegrove with Fraternity, 1972) (Arthur Crudup cover)

== Personnel ==
- Bon Scott – lead vocals, recorder, chorus, percussions
- Mick Jurd – lead guitar
- Bruce Howe – bass guitar, lead vocals
- John Bisset – keyboards, lead vocals
- Sam See – slide guitar, piano
- "Uncle" John Eyers – harmonica, recorder
- John Freeman – drums
- Tony Buettel – drums
- Mauri Berg – guitar
