= Lovegrove =

Lovegrove is a surname. Notable people with the surname include:

- Brendhan Lovegrove, New Zealand comedian and public speaker
- Fred Lovegrove (1939–2013), American politician
- Gavin Lovegrove (born 1967), javelin thrower from New Zealand
- James Lovegrove (born 1965), British writer
- Paul Lovegrove, American politician
- Rhys Lovegrove (born 1987), Australian rugby league footballer
- Ross Lovegrove (born 1958), British industrial designer
- Stephen Lovegrove (born 1966), English civil servant
- Suzi Lovegrove (1955–1987), American-born woman whose battle with AIDS was chronicled in the television documentary Suzi's Story, wife of Vince Lovegrove
- Vince Lovegrove (1948–2012), Australian journalist, music manager and television producer

== See also ==
- Lovegrove Point
