= Seasons Change =

Seasons Change may refer to:

== Film and television ==
- Seasons Change (film), a 2006 Thai romantic comedy
- "Seasons Change", a 2008 episode of Property Virgins

== Music ==
=== Albums ===
- Seasons Change (Lee Konitz and Karl Berger album), 1979
- Seasons Change (Scotty McCreery album), 2018
- Seasons Change, by Ray Boltz, 1992
- Seasons Change, a mixtape by Poolside, 2010

=== Songs ===
- "Seasons Change" (song), by Exposé, 1987
- "Seasons Change", by Anastacia from Anastacia, 2004
- "Seasons Change", by Corinne Bailey Rae from Corinne Bailey Rae, 2006
- "Season's Change", by Jagged Edge from Jagged Edge, 2006
- "Seasons Change", by Michael Martin Murphey from Swans Against the Sun, 1976
- "Seasons Change", by Quasimoto from Yessir Whatever, 2013

== See also ==
- Seasons of Change – The Complete Recordings 1970–1974, an album by Fraternity, 2021
- Season of Changes, an album by Brian Blade & The Fellowship Band, 2008
