= Seasons of Change =

Australian rock song

Single by Blackfeather

from the album At the Mountains of Madness
- B-side: "On This Day That I Die"
- Released: May 1971
- Recorded: Late 1970
- Studio: Festival, Sydney, Australia
- Genre: Progressive rock; hard rock
- Length: 3:48
- Label: Infinity/Festival
- Songwriters: Neale Johns, John Robinson
- Producers: John Robinson, Richard Batchens

Blackfeather singles chronology
"Seasons of Change" (1971)	"Boppin' the Blues" (1972)

"Seasons of Change" is an Australian rock song co-written by Neale Johns and John Robinson of Blackfeather, who recorded it in late 1970. It was intended as an album-only track for their debut album, At the Mountains of Madness (April 1971), and was handed by the songwriters to members of local rock group Fraternity, who had worked on Blackfeather's studio sessions. Fraternity relocated to Adelaide after recording their rendition of "Seasons of Change", which they issued as a single in March 1971.

After Fraternity's single appeared on Adelaide's radio charts, Blackfeather's version of the song was released in May by David Sinclair, the boss of their label, Infinity, peaking at number 15 on the Go-Set National Top 60. According to Australian musicologist, Ian McFarlane, Fraternity's version "was overshadowed on the national charts by Blackfeather's more powerful rendition."

== Background ==
"Seasons of Change" was co-written by Neale Johns and John Robinson of Sydney's progressive rock group, Blackfeather; its sheet music was published by Essex Music of Australia. Australian musicologist Ian McFarlane described it as "soaring, seductive" and "strong enough to be issued in its own right" as a single. John Phillips of Beat observed, it "features a haunting recorder melody within a captivating arrangement that moves effortlessly from folk to rock and back, driven by up-front drums and lead singer [Johns]' distinctive vocals."

Blackfeather had formed in April 1970 by Johns on lead vocals with ex-Dave Miller Set members, Robinson on lead guitar, Leith Corbett on bass guitar and Mike McCormack on drums. Corbett and McCormack were soon replaced by Robert Fortescue on bass guitar and Alexander Kash on drums. The group were signed with Festival Records' newly founded progressive subsidiary, Infinity Records by its label boss, David Sinclair. Late in 1970 they began recording their debut album, At the Mountains of Madness (April 1971), with co-production by Robinson and Richard Batchens (the Cleves) at Festival Studios, Sydney. Robinson invited members of fellow Sydney rock group, Fraternity, John Bisset (keyboards) and Bon Scott (recorder, percussion), to contribute to the album. In July 1971, At the Mountains of Madness, peaked at number 7 on the Go-Set Top 20 Albums chart. Robinson later recalled working on "Seasons of Change":

Later [1970] sessions at Festival featured [Scott] and [Bisset]... [that song] had started life as a (Dave Miller Set) jam on stage at Coffs Harbour, and was developed at Hornsby Police Boys Club. [Johns] supplied the title and the chorus, myself furnishing the rest. It never made it on stage [for Dave Miller Set] - always sounding empty and half-baked... Scott played recorder on [our] recording... the key was changed from E minor to E flat minor to accommodate [Johns'] range. We had a lot of trouble getting the recorder to play in tune, and there are still notes that make me cringe when I listen to it. I used an old gut string acoustic [guitar] of [Batchens]', detuned a semitone. I remember [Batchens] used a Neumann U67 valve mike on both instruments

— John Robinson, MilesAgo: "Blackfeather" (2002)

While recording, Robinson and Sinclair had promised Bisset and Scott, on a handshake, that Blackfeather would not release "Seasons of Change" as a single. However, Sinclair reneged on that deal and issued it in May 1971 after learning of Fraternity's chart success in Adelaide. Blackfeather's version reached number 15 on the Go-Set National Top 60 and remained on the charts for 16 weeks. On the end of year charts, it peaked at number 40 on Go-Set Top 60 Singles chart and number 11 on the Top 20 Australian Artists Singles chart for 1971. It also reached number 11 on the Kent Music Report – a retro-calculated Australian top 100 singles chart, published in 1993.

Internal friction resulted in Blackfeather splitting by August 1971 – being replaced by alternate versions led by Johns and Robinson. Robinson lost the legal dispute over the band's name and Johns continued with various line-ups thereafter. His group "moved toward a simpler rock & roll style." Blackfeather's next single, "Boppin' the Blues" (July 1972), was a blues-rock song, which reached number one on Go-Set singles chart and remained for four weeks. The CD version of At the Mountains of Madness, with "Seasons of Change", was issued in 1991 via Festival Records. The Canberra Times' Norman Abjorensen included it in his list of greatest rock songs.

== Track listing ==
"Seasons of Change" by Blackfeather via Infinity Records (May 1971), catalogue no.: INK 4248
No.	Title	Writer(s)	Length
1.	"Seasons of Change"	Neale Johns, John Robinson	3:48
2.	"On This Day That I Die"	Robinson	4:00

== Personnel ==
Blackfeather

- Robert Fortescue – bass guitar
- Neale Johns – lead vocals
- Alexander Kash – drums
- John Robinson – acoustic guitar, electric guitar

Additional musicians

- Bon Scott – recorder

Artisans

- John Robinson, Richard Batchens – producer

== Charting ==
Weekly charts

Chart (1971)	Peak position
Australian (Go-Set)	15
Australian (KMR)	11

End of year charts

Chart (1971)	Peak position
Australian (Go-Set)	40
Australian (KMR)	65
Australian Artists (Go-Set)	11

== Fraternity version ==
"Seasons of Change"

Single by Fraternity

from the album Flaming Galah
- B-side: "Sommerville R.I.P."
- Released: March 1971
- Recorded: November 1970
- Studio: United Sound, Sydney
- Genre: Rock
- Length: 3:34
- Label: Sweet Peach/Festival
- Songwriters: Neale Johns, John Robinson
- Producers: Doug Ashdown, Jimmy Stewart, Fraternity

Fraternity singles chronology
"Why Did It Have to Be Me?" (1970)	"Seasons of Change" (1971)	"Livestock" (1971)

Fraternity's rendition of "Seasons of Change" was recorded in November 1970. The rock group had formed earlier that year in Sydney with ex-members of Levi Smith's Clefs John Bisset on keyboards and vocals, Tony Buettel on drums, Bruce Howe on bass guitar and vocals, and Mick Jurd on lead guitar. Bon Scott (as Ronald Belford Scott) joined on lead vocals after his teenybopper group, the Valentines completed their farewell tour and disbanded in August. Soon after John Freeman (ex-Levi Smith's Clefs) replaced Buettel on drums.

Bisset and Scott helped record Blackfeather's debut album and one of its tracks, "Seasons of Change", was given for their group's use by its writers, Johns and Robinson. Fraternity began recording their debut album, Livestock (June 1971) at Sydney's United Sound Studios, which was produced by Doug Ashdown and Jimmy Stewart for Sweet Peach Records. James R Turner of We Are Cult observed, "Mixing blues rock, country rock and elements of what would become prog, [that album] is an absolute cracker of a record, [it shows] the developing years of the band as they found their feet as songwriters and performers in style and has a wonderful groove and sound to it." Fraternity recorded their rendition of "Seasons of Change" at the same venue.

The band relocated to Adelaide by November 1970 and released "Seasons of Change" as a non-album single in March 1971 via Sweet Peach. John Piggott of The Senior described Scott's vocals, "it's soft and wistful, while on [B-side] 'Somerville', it's country-infused." The song became a number-one hit in Adelaide and reached number 51 on the Kent Music Report's Top 100 Singles chart. However, as McFarlane noted, Fraternity's version "was overshadowed on the national charts by Blackfeather's more powerful rendition."

=== Re-releases ===
A longer version of the song was re-recorded for their second album, Flaming Galah, released in April 1972; their line-up was Bisset on organ, Freeman on drums, Howe on bass guitar, Jurd on lead guitar and Scott on lead vocals and new members John Eyers on harmonica and Sam See on piano and guitar. Flaming Galah peaked at number 28 on Kent Music Report top 100 albums chart. This early version of Fraternity disbanded in 1973; Scott joined Mount Lofty Rangers before becoming lead singer of AC/DC in late 1974.

Raven Records released Seasons of Change the Early Years 1967-72 (1988) as a compilation album of the Valentines and Fraternity's material. Their single version of "Seasons of Change" was added as bonus material when Fraternity re-released Livestock (1998) on CD. A 3×CD box set, Seasons of Change – The Complete Recordings 1970–1974, was issued under Fraternity's name in 2021 via Cherry Red to showcase Scott's work with that group and celebrate the single's 50th anniversary. Besides the single and album versions, this box set also includes a live recording from August 1971 of Fraternity's Hoadley's Battle of the Sounds winning performance, which had previously been issued on Complete Sessions 1971-72 in 1996 via Raven.

=== Track listing 2 ===
"Seasons of Change" by Fraternity via Sweet Peach Records (March 1971), catalogue no.: SP 113
No.	Title	Writer(s)	Length
1.	"Seasons of Change"	Neale Johns, John Robinson	3:34
2.	"Sommerville"	Bruce Howe, Samuel See	3:49

=== Personnel 2 ===
Fraternity

- John Bisset – keyboards, vocals
- John Freeman – drums
- Bruce Howe – bass guitar, vocals
- Mick Jurd – lead guitar.
- Bon Scott – lead vocals

Artisans

- Doug Ashdown, Jimmy Stewart, Fraternity – producer

=== Charting 2 ===
Weekly charts

Chart (1971)	Peak position
Australian (Go-Set)	–
Australian (KMR)	51
