= At the Mountains of Madness (Blackfeather album) =

1971 Australian rock music album

Studio album by Blackfeather
- Released: April 1971
- Recorded: 1970
- Studios: Festival; Sydney, Australia
- Genres: Psychedelic rock; progressive rock; hard rock
- Length: 39:39
- Label: Infinity/Festival
- Producers: John Robinson, Richard Batchens

Blackfeather chronology
At the Mountains of Madness (1971)	Boppin' the Blues (1972)

Singles from At the Mountains of Madness
- 1. "Seasons of Change" Released: May 1971

At the Mountains of Madness is the debut album by Australian rock band Blackfeather. It was released in April 1971 for the Infinity sub-label of Festival and was produced by Richard Batchens with the band's guitarist, John Robinson. At the Mountains of Madness peaked at No. 7 on the Go-Set Top 20 Albums chart. It provided the single, "Seasons of Change" in May 1971, which reached No. 15 on the Go-Set National Top 60 chart.

== Background ==
At the Mountains of Madness is the debut album by Sydney-based progressive rock band, Blackfeather. They had formed in April 1970 by Neale Johns on lead vocals with ex-Dave Miller Set members, John Robinson on lead guitar, Leith Corbett on bass guitar and Mike McCormack on drums. Corbett and McCormack were replaced by Robert Fortescue on bass guitar and Alexander Kash on drums. The group were signed to Festival Records' newly founded progressive subsidiary, Infinity Records by its label boss, David Sinclair. Late in that year they began recording the album, with co-production by Robinson and Richard Batchens (the Cleves) at Festival Studios, Sydney. Robinson invited members of fellow Sydney rock group, Fraternity, John Bisset (keyboards) and Bon Scott (as Ronald Belford Scott on recorder, percussion), to contribute to the album.

It was issued in April 1971 and by July, At the Mountains of Madness, had peaked at No. 7 on the Go-Set Top 20 Albums chart. On the retro-calculated Kent Music Report (1993) top 100 albums chart, it reached No. 14. The third track, "Seasons of Change Part 1", re-titled "Seasons of Change", was issued as the album's only single in May 1971 by label boss, Sinclair. This was against the wishes of Robinson and his friends in Fraternity – the latter had recorded their cover version of the song for a single, which was issued in March 1971. By that time, Fraternity had relocated to Adelaide and their rendition was appearing on the local radio charts, which prompted Sinclair to renege on his agreement with Robinson and Scott to not release Blackfeather's version.

== Writing and recording ==
According to lead guitarist, songwriter and co-producer, Robinson At the Mountains of Madness evolved from early demo sessions with the original line-up, "At one session in Hornsby, an engineer named John Zuliaka taped us for a demo. [...] It was sent to EMI and Festival. Both sent back contracts to sign. We were to book through NOVA and one John Sinclair was our PR man. We signed up to Essex Music under John Brummel and to Festival's new Infinity label, headed by John's brother David Sinclair." Album sessions began after former Perth residents, Fortescue and Kash had replaced Corbett and McCormack. Earliest tracks recorded were "'The Rat' and 'Long-legged Lovely' [...] By this time I was playing another Stratocaster and had swapped my sitar for a Watkins Copycat tape-echo unit. The tube pre-amp in the Watkins was great. It overdrove to front end of the Lenard amp perfectly." After Robinson formed a friendship with Fraternity's Bisset and Scott, "I borrowed Mick Jurds' Strauss Guitar Amp for some songs." Recording "Seasons of Change Part 1" occurred during later sessions.

Rehearsals happened in John Spooner's venue, who operated Johnathon's Nightclub. Robinson had met Scott at that club, when Fraternity began their residency. In the late 1990s, Robinson re-evaluated At the Mountains of Madness with a track-by-track analysis. Robinson wrote three tracks alone and co-wrote the other three with Johns.

== Reception ==
At the Mountains of Madness is described by Australian musicologist, Ian McFarlane, "It remains a highly regarded progressive rock album, highlighted by Robinson's fluid, inventive guitar technique and a swag of adventurous songs." Duncan Kimball of MilesAgo website recalled, "[it's an] Australian progressive classic", but "has perhaps not aged as well as some others from the period". AllMusic's William Ruhlmann noticed "[they] began as a progressive rock unit, which can be heard on Mountains of Madness (1971), but later moved toward a simpler rock & roll style".

== Track listing ==
All tracks are written by John David Robinson, unless otherwise noted.

At the Mountains of Madness (April 1971) via Infinity Records, catalogue no.: SINL-934159
No.	Title	Writer(s)	Length
1.	"At the Mountains of Madness"		3:30
2.	"On This Day That I Die"		4:00
3.	"Seasons of Change Part 1"	Neale S Johns, Robinson	3:53
4.	"Mangos Theme Part 2"		8:04
5.	"Long Legged Lovely"	Johns, Robinson	7:34
6.	"Rat (Suite)" 6.1. "Main Title (The Rat)" 6.2. "The Trap" 6.3. "Spanish Blues" 6.4. "Blazwaorden (Land of Dreams)" 6.5. "Finale (The Rat)"	Johns, Robinson	13:53
Total length:			39:39

== Personnel ==
Blackfeather

- Robert Fortescue – bass guitar
- Neale Johns – lead vocals
- Alexander Kash – drums
- John Robinson – guitars (electric, acoustic)

Additional musicians

- John Bisset – electric piano (track 6.2)
- Ronald Belford Scott – recorder, timbales, tambourine

Artisans

- Richard Batchens – audio engineer, producer at Festival Studios, Sydney
- John Robinson – producer at Festival Studios, Sydney

== Charts ==
Chart (1971)	Peak position
Australian (Go-Set)	7
Australian (Kent Music Report)	14
