= Doug Ashdown =

Australian singer-songwriter

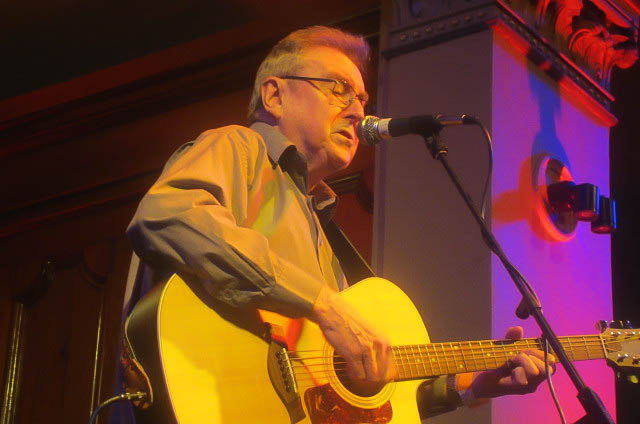
- Ashdown performing at the Mortlock Library, Adelaide in 2015

Background information
- Born: Douglas Wesley Ashdown; 29 July 1942 (age 84); Adelaide, South Australia, Australia
- Genres: Rock, folk, country
- Occupation: Singer-songwriter
- Years active: 1959–present
- Labels: CBS; Philips; Sweet Peach; Billingsgate; Festival; Infinity; Ash; Larrikin; NashWest; Roadshow
- Website: dougashdown.com

Douglas Wesley Ashdown (born 29 July 1942) is an Australian rock music singer-songwriter from Adelaide. He had a top 40 hit on the Australian singles chart with "Winter in America" or "Leave Love Enough Alone" (1976). It also reached No. 13 on the Dutch Singles Chart in 1978 and charted in 14 of the first 15 editions of the Dutch annual Top 2000 of all time, with a peak position of 820 in 1999. In 1988, "Winter in America" was covered by Dutch singer René Froger, and in 1994 by Australian group the Robertson Brothers. Ashdown also reached the Australian top 50 with "The Saddest Song of All" (1970).

== Biography ==
Douglas Wesley Ashdown was born in 1942 in Adelaide, South Australia. At the age of 17 he travelled to England to play in a rock band. In 1961, he was back in Adelaide and played guitar alongside Bobby Bright as a vocalist in the Bowmen. Best known in the thriving Adelaide folk scene for his guitar work, he released his first album This Is Doug Ashdown in 1966. His 1960s popular singles were "Something Strange" in 1968, and in 1969, "Whole Lotta Shakin' Goin On", a cover of the Jerry Lee Lewis' hit.

In 1970, he signed with the independent label, Sweet Peach, and issued "The Saddest Song of All" in August, which peaked at number 46 on the Kent Music Report singles chart. The song was written by Ashdown and Jim Stewart, who became his long-term producer and co-writer. The associated album, The Age of Mouse, was the first double LP album of original material released by an Australian artist. Ashdown and Stewart produced Fraternity's debut album Livestock (June 1971) and their single, "Seasons of Change" (March). Ashdown and Stewart relocated to the United States, living in Nashville. While there, the pair co-wrote "Just Thank Me", for David Rogers, who released it in 1973. It peaked at No. 17 on the US Country Music Singles Chart. They also co-wrote "Leave Love Enough Alone", which Ashdown released in 1974 after relocating to Sydney. He had a minor hit with it when it was renamed "Winter in America" and released in 1976. It peaked at No. 3 in Brisbane, No. 14 in Melbourne and No. 30 in Sydney.

In 1977, his album Trees won the King of Pop Award for "Best Album Cover" from TV Week, the Australian television entertainment magazine. Ashdown also worked with science fiction writer/songwriter Terry Dowling on recordings of Dowling's song-cycle "Amberjack", about a stranded time traveller. Ashdown contributed lead vocals and guitar to six of the tracks of Dowling's song-cycle, which were broadcast by the ABC in 1977.

He continued to release singles and albums, and had minor chart success into the 1980s. He co-wrote several original songs for the 1995 film Billy's Holiday.

== Discography ==
=== Studio albums ===
List of albums, with selected chart positions
Title	Album details	Peak chart positions	Certification
Title	Album details	AUS	Certification
This Is Doug Ashdown	Released: 1965; Label: CBS (SBP 233283)	-	
The Real Thing	Released: 1966; Label: CBS (SBP 233317)	-	
Source	Released: 1968; Label: CBS (SBP 233516)	-	
The Age of Mouse	Released: 1970; Label: Sweet Peach (SP 12001)	-	
Leave Love Enough Alone	Released: November 1974; Label: Billingsgate Records (L35294)	38	AUS: Gold
Trees	Released: September 1977; Label: Ash (BGLP 1001)	98	
Empty Without You	Released: 1977; Label: Festival Records (L35832)	-	
The World for the Right Kind of Man	Released: 1983; Label: CBS (SBP 237882)	-	
Love Lives	Released: 1986; Label: Larrikin Records (LRF207)	-	
No Cheap Grace	Released: 1995; Label: Roadshow Music (17510-2)	-	
Homesong	Released: 2001; Label: Sleeping Dog)	-	

=== Live albums ===
List of live, with selected chart details
Title	Album details
Doug Ashdown Live	Released: 1971; Label: Sweet Peach (SP 501)
Doug Ashdown and Friends Live – The Blues and Then Some	Released: 2001; Label: Sleeping Dog

=== Compilation albums ===
List of compilation, with selected chart details
Title	Album details
Really and Sincerely	Released: 1999; Label: Sleeping Dog; A 70-minute collection of 1967-69 studio out-takes and rarities
A Career Collection 1965-2000	Released: 2000; Label: Raven Records (RVCD-132)

=== Charting singles ===
List of singles, with selected chart positions
Year	Title	Peak chart positions	Album
Year	Title	AUS	Album
1970	"The Saddest Song of All"	46	The Age of Mouse
1976	"Winter in America (Leave Love Enough Alone)"	37	Leave Love Enough Alone
1981	"And the Band Played Waltzing Matilda"	40	The World for the Right Kind of Man

== Awards ==
=== Australian Record Awards ===
Year	Nominee / work	Award	Result
1975	Leave Love Enough Alone	Easy Listening Male Album of the Year	Won
