= Suzi Lovegrove =

Australian actress with AIDS

Suzi Lovegrove, born Susan Marie Papaleo, (October 23, 1955–June 14, 1987) was an HIV-positive American-born woman, whose battle with AIDS was chronicled in a landmark television documentary entitled Suzi's Story, made at her request, which premiered on Australian television in 1987. Her son Troy contracted the virus while still in the womb, and died at the age of 7 on 3 June 1993.

Suzi Lovegrove was an actress known as Suzi Sidewinder. In 1983, she had a small part in the film Get Crazy, playing a member of Nada's band. Nada was played by Suzi's friend Lori Eastside, who later appeared briefly in Suzi's Story. While promoting the movie, on a flight between the U.S. and Australia, she met future husband Vince Lovegrove. Vince had been the lead singer of The Valentines in the 1960s, and later managed Divinyls and Jimmy Barnes.
