= Flaming Galah =

Studio album by Fraternity
- Released: April 1972
- Recorded: 1971–1972
- Studios: Bill Armstrong's Studios; Melbourne, Victoria
- Genres: Blues rock; boogie rock; progressive rock
- Length: 42:13
- Label: RCA Victor
- Producer: Grape Productions

Fraternity chronology
Livestock (1971)	Flaming Galah (1972)	Complete Sessions 1971–72 (1996)

Flaming Galah is the second and final studio album by the Australian rock band Fraternity, released in 1972.

This album differs musically from their previous effort, Livestock, which consisted mostly of a progressive sound. For Flaming Galah, the band moved in a more blues/boogie rock direction. They continued their progressive side however, with re-recordings of a number of tracks from Livestock, such as "You Have a God", "Raglan's Folly", and "Canyon Suite" (known as "Grand Canyon Suites" on Livestock), and with the introduction of "Seasons of Change", a considerable amount of progressive rock is evident on the album. "Annabelle" is a reworking of "Cool Spot", from Livestock.

Interviews with band members clarify the songwriting credits for those songs which were credited to the whole band on the album sleeve. John Bisset recalled "Welfare Boogie" as having been written by "Sam [See] and possibly Bruce [Howe] and Bon [Scott]", with "Hemming's Farm" being "mainly Sam's". Sam See has stated that he wrote "Hemming's Farm" himself, and co-wrote "Welfare Boogie" with Terry Wilkins from his previous band The Flying Circus. Bisset himself wrote "If You Got It".

== Track listing ==
- All tracks written by Fraternity unless otherwise stated.
1. "Welfare Boogie" – 3:41
2. "Annabelle" (Mick Jurd, John Bisset) – 3:57
3. "Seasons of Change" (John Robinson, Neale Johns) – 3:53
4. "If You Got It" – 4:04
5. "You Have a God" (M. Jurd, Carol Jurd) – 3:10
6. "Hemming's Farm" (Sam See) – 3:48
7. "Raglan's Folly" (M. Jurd, Bon Scott) – 4:41
8. "Getting Off" (M. Jurd) – 3:23
9. "Sommerville R.I.P." (Bruce Howe, Sam See) – 3:52
10. "Canyon Suite" (M. Jurd) – 7:28

== Charts ==
Chart (1972)	Peak position
Australian (Kent Music Report)	28

== Personnel ==
- Bon Scott – lead vocals, recorder
- Mick Jurd – lead guitars
- Sam See – slide guitar, piano
- Bruce Howe – bass guitar
- John Bisset – keyboards
- "Uncle" John Eyers – harmonica
- John Freeman – drums

== Re-recordings ==
Five out of the ten songs on Flaming Galah are re-recordings of older tracks:

- "Seasons of Change" originally appeared as a single released after the first album but before Flaming Galah.
- "You Have a God" has an added echo effect the Livestock LP version did not.
- "Raglan's Folly" is shorter on this album and does not feature the use of Scott's recorder.
- "Sommerville R.I.P." is virtually the same as the Livestock version except that the first version was named simply "Summerville".
- "Canyon Suite" is a rerecording of "Grand Canyon Suites", from Livestock, and features more use of piano, organ, and synthesized guitar than the original version.

Unlike Livestock, Flaming Galah has never had a CD reissue, although both this and the first album have been released as a two-CD set including all the singles and other rarities released during Fraternity's career.
