= Winter in America (song) =

1974 song by Doug Ashdown

Single by Doug Ashdown

from the album Winter in America
- Released: 1976
- Recorded: 1974
- Genre: soft rock, folk
- Length: 3:22
- Label: Festival, Infinity
- Songwriters: Doug Ashdown, Jimmy Stewart
- Producers: Doug Ashdown, Jimmy Stewart

"Winter in America" or "Leave Love Enough Alone" is a 1974 soft rock song by Australian singer-songwriter Doug Ashdown, co-written with Jimmy Stewart. It was issued in that year but did not chart. It was re-released as a single in 1976 and on his album Winter in America (1976) via Festival / Infinity. The song was a top 40 hit in Australia and The Netherlands.

== Background ==
It was originally titled "Leave Love Enough Alone" and released as a single in 1974, but failed to chart. When retitled "Winter in America" in 1976, it became a top 40 hit in Australia, also reaching No. 14 in Melbourne and No. 30 in Sydney. In 1978, it also became a hit in Belgium and the Netherlands.

"Winter in America" has been covered by Marco Bakker (1984), Gerard Cox (1987) and René Froger (1988) which became his breakthrough hit and reached number 5 on the Dutch charts and launched his career as one of The Netherlands most popular singers, and in Dutch by The Kik (2014), titled "December". Ashdown's original was also covered in 1994 by the Australian band The Robertson Brothers.

== Lyrics ==
The lyrics are set in the United States during December and describe a man whose partner has left him for someone else. He expresses his heartache and sadness, though also hopes she's happier with the other man.
