= The Spektors =

Australian beat, and rock 'n' roll band

- The Spektors in 1966

Background information
- Origin: Perth, Western Australia, Australia
- Genres: Pop, rock and roll, beat
- Years active: 1964–1966
- Label: See for Miles
- Past members: John Collins; Brian Gannon; Murray Gracie; Wyn Milsom; Bon Scott

The Spektors were an Australian beat, pop and rock 'n' roll band active in Perth from 1964 to mid-1966. Their co-drummer and part-time lead singer, a then-unknown Bon Scott, was later lead vocalist with hard rock band AC/DC, from 1974 until his death in 1980.

== History ==
The Spektors were formed in late 1964 in Perth by co-vocalists and co-drummers John Collins and Bon Scott, along with Brian Gannon on bass guitar, Murray Gracie on rhythm guitar and vocals and Wyn Milsom on lead guitar. Early rehearsals occurred in Gannon's or Scott's parents' homes before switching to the RSL hall, Coogee. Their first performance was at a youth hall in Medina, which was organised by John Rand, who became their manager. Collins and Scott each played half a set as drummer and the other half as lead vocalist. They performed cover versions of beat, pop and rock 'n' roll songs.

The Spektors won the Perth heat of the national Hoadley's Battle of the Sounds competition. Their repertoire included popular songs, often originally by the Rolling Stones or the Beatles. As the band developed, Scott would step up and sing occasionally while Collins played drums, on songs such as Van Morrison's "Gloria". According to Gracie their influences were "more blues than pop – groups like the Pretty Things, Them and the Kinks".

In October 1965 the group recorded four tracks for local TV show, Club 17, including versions of "Gloria", Mike Berry's "On My Mind", the Beatles' "Yesterday" and George Gershwin's "It Ain't Necessarily So". In late 1966, Milsom and Scott joined members of local rivals, the Winstons to form a new pop group, the Valentines, with Scott sharing vocal duties with the Winstons' lead vocalist Vince Lovegrove.

== Members ==
- John Collins - vocals, drums
- Brian Gannon - bass guitar
- Murray Gracie – rhythm guitar
- Wyn Milsom – lead guitar
- Bon Scott – vocals, drums

== Discography ==
- Bon Scott with the Spektors (CD, 1992, See for Miles records)
- Bon Scott with the Spektors and the Valentines (CD, 1999, See for Miles records)

These songs and interviews were pirated from the TVW channel 7 show, Club 17 by Martin Clark, who was the recording engineer at the time (October 1965).
