= Touch Too Much =

1980 single by AC/DC

- Version with photo reversed

Single by AC/DC

from the album Highway to Hell
- B-side: "Live Wire" (live) "Shot Down in Flames" (live)
- Released: 25 January 1980 (UK)
- Recorded: March – April 1979
- Studio: Roundhouse (London)
- Genre: Hard rock
- Length: 4:26; 6:34 (Original version)
- Label: Atlantic
- Songwriters: Angus Young; Malcolm Young; Bon Scott
- Producer: Robert John "Mutt" Lange

AC/DC singles chronology
"Girls Got Rhythm" (1979)	"Touch Too Much" (1980)	"You Shook Me All Night Long" (1980)

Music video
- "Touch Too Much" on YouTube

"Touch Too Much" is a song by the Australian hard rock band AC/DC. It was released on their 1979 album Highway to Hell, their last with lead vocalist Bon Scott, who died the following year.

== Overview ==
The song was performed by Scott and AC/DC on BBC music show Top of the Pops, 12 days before his death. This episode, dated 7 February 1980, was repeated by BBC Four on 19 February 2015, the 35th anniversary of Scott's death.

The band had earlier recorded another song with vastly different words and music entitled "Touch Too Much", but the song was never released. That track would eventually see the light of day in 1997 when it was included in Volts, part of the band's Bonfire box set.

The cover of the single in many territories was released with the band photograph flipped horizontally, incorrectly showing the Youngs and bassist Cliff Williams as playing left-handed.

The music video was a live rehearsal performance from the If You Want Blood Tour between 1978 and 1979, along with "Walk All Over You" on the Family Jewels DVD compilation.

Prior to joining AC/DC on the Rock or Bust World Tour, Axl Rose said this was his favourite AC/DC song. The song was first performed live on 22 May 2016 in Prague.

== Reception ==
Cash Box called it "high voltage rock...with Bon Scott's gritty vocals and Angus Young's scrappy lead guitar work," and praised the hook.

== Charts ==
=== Weekly charts ===
Chart (1980)	Peak position
UK Singles (OCC)	29
West Germany (GfK)	13

=== Year-end charts ===
Chart (1980)	Position
West Germany (Official German Charts)	45

== Personnel ==
- Bon Scott – vocals
- Angus Young – lead guitar
- Malcolm Young – rhythm guitar, backing vocals
- Cliff Williams – bass guitar, backing vocals
- Phil Rudd – drums

== Cover versions ==
- Serbian hard rock band Cactus Jack recorded a version on their live cover album DisCover in 2002.
