= Highway to Hell =

1979 studio album by AC/DC

Studio album by AC/DC
- Released: 27 July 1979
- Recorded: 24 March – 14 April 1979
- Studio: Roundhouse (London)
- Genres: Hard rock; blues rock
- Length: 41:38
- Labels: Albert; Atlantic
- Producer: Mutt Lange

AC/DC chronology
If You Want Blood You've Got It (1978)	Highway to Hell (1979)	Back in Black (1980)

Alternative cover art
- Original Australian cover

Singles from Highway to Hell
- 1. "Highway to Hell" Released: 27 July 1979; 2. "Girls Got Rhythm" Released: 2 November 1979; 3. "Touch Too Much" Released: 25 January 1980 (UK)

Highway to Hell is the sixth studio album by Australian hard rock band AC/DC, released on 27 July 1979, by Albert Productions and Atlantic Records. It is the first of three albums produced by Robert John "Mutt" Lange, and is the last album featuring lead singer Bon Scott, who died on 19 February 1980.

== Background ==
By 1978, AC/DC had released five albums internationally and had toured Australia and Europe extensively. In 1977, they landed in America and, with virtually no radio support, began to amass a live following. The band's most recent album, the live If You Want Blood, had reached number 13 in the United Kingdom, and the two albums previous to that, 1977's Let There Be Rock and 1978's Powerage, had seen the band find their raging, blues-based hard rock sound. Although the American branch of Atlantic Records had rejected the group's 1976 LP Dirty Deeds Done Dirt Cheap, it now believed the band was poised to strike it big in the States if only they would work with a producer who could give them a radio-friendly sound. Since their 1975 Australian debut High Voltage, all of AC/DC's albums had been produced by George Young and Harry Vanda. According to the book AC/DC: Maximum Rock & Roll, the band was not enthusiastic about the idea, especially guitarists Angus Young and Malcolm Young, who felt a strong sense of loyalty to their older brother George:

Being told what to do was bad enough but what really pissed off Malcolm and Angus was they felt that George was being treated disrespectfully by Atlantic, like an amateur with no great track record when it came to production ... Malcolm seemed less pleased with the situation and went so far as to tell Radio 2JJ in Sydney that the band had been virtually "forced" to go with an outside producer. Losing Harry was one thing. Losing George was almost literally like losing a sixth member of the band, and much more.

The label paired the band with South African-born Eddie Kramer, best known for his pioneering work as engineer for Jimi Hendrix but also for mega-bands Led Zeppelin and Kiss. Kramer met the band at Criteria Studios in Miami, Florida but, by all accounts, they did not get on. Geoff Barton quotes Malcolm Young in Guitar Legends magazine: "Kramer was a bit of a prat. He looked at Bon and said to us, 'Can your guy sing?' He might've sat behind the knobs for Hendrix, but he's certainly not Hendrix, I can tell you that much." Former AC/DC manager Michael Browning recalls in the 1994 book Highway to Hell: The Life and Times of AC/DC Legend Bon Scott, "I got a phone call from Malcolm in Florida, to say, 'This guy's hopeless, do something, he's trying to talk us into recording that Spencer Davis song,' 'Gimme Some Lovin',' 'I'm a Man,' whatever it was." Browning turned to Zambian-born producer Robert John "Mutt" Lange to step in. Lange was best known for producing the Boomtown Rats number-one hit "Rat Trap" and post-pub rock bands like Clover, City Boy, and Graham Parker. In 1979, singer Bon Scott told Rock Australia Magazine, "Three weeks in Miami and we hadn't written a thing with Kramer. So one day we told him we were going to have a day off and not to bother coming in. This was Saturday, and we snuck into the studio and on that one day we put down six songs, sent the tape to Lange and said, 'Will you work with us?'" The band had also signed up with new management, firing Michael Browning and hiring Peter Mensch, an aggressive American who had helped develop the careers of Aerosmith and Ted Nugent.

== Recording ==
With "Mutt" Lange in place as producer, recording commenced at the Roundhouse Recording Studios in Chalk Farm, north London on 24 March 1979, and ended on 14 April. Clinton Walker described this process in his book Highway to Hell. The band had spent about three weeks at Roundhouse Studio, constantly working on the album. They worked for fifteen hours a day, usually for days on end, working on and reworking the songs within the album. This process was a culture shock to the band, who had grown used to spending about three weeks or so on an album, not the exhausting three-month period they spent on Highway to Hell. In spite of this, Lange's process was appreciated by the band, who had a similarly solid work ethic. Brothers Malcolm and Angus Young later went on to describe Lange's contributions to the band in an article in Mojo by Sylvie Simmons. Lange was able to refine the tracks for the band, ensuring that sound, guitar, drums, and even vocals were up to par with both his and the band's expectations. Tour manager Ian Jeffery, who was present during recordings, recalled the many changes Lange had put the band through, such as during a particular recording session that led to an argument between Bon Scott and Lange. Lange had advised Scott to control his breathing during the recording of "If You Want Blood," leading Scott to demand that he do the technique himself. Lange was able to do it without complication, much to the shock of those in the room. Soon after, the band became receptive to Lange's instruction.

In AC/DC: Maximum Rock & Roll, Arnaud Durieux writes that Lange, a trained singer, showed Scott how to breathe so he could be a technically better singer on songs like "Touch Too Much" and would join in on background vocals himself, having to stand on the other side of the studio because his own voice was so distinctive. The melodic backing vocals were a new element to the band's sound, but the polish Lange added did not detract from the band's characteristic crunch, thereby satisfying both the band and Atlantic Records at the same time.

Lange also taught Angus some useful lessons, instructing him to play his solos while sitting next to the producer. Jeffrey recalled an instance where he sat down with the lead guitarist to show him how he wanted him to play. While Angus initially reacted with hostility, he sat down with Lange, who instructed him by pointing toward notes on the fretboard. These notes turned out to be the solo from "Highway to Hell." Moments like these stood out as significant to the band. Lange didn't ask them to do the impossible, nor tell them their past process was incorrect. He heightened their process further, shaping the album into what it came to be.

== Tracks ==
The album's most famous song is the title track. From the outset, Atlantic Records hated the idea of using the song as the album title, with Angus later telling Guitar World's Alan Di Perna that, despite backlash, the name is meant to depict the experience of touring for the band.

In a 2003 interview with Bill Crandall of Rolling Stone, Angus further recalled the genesis of the song. Residing in Miami at the time, Angus and his brother Malcolm played the guitar intro and drum beat to "Highway to Hell" while playing in a rehearsal studio. They recorded this initial intro and beat on a cassette tape. Which was then taken by a man in the studio with the two, who gave the cassette to his child, who then proceeded to unravel the tape. Bon Scott was then able to later repair the broken cassette for further use.

"Highway to Hell" quickly took on a life of its own just after the death of Bon Scott in 1980. Just months after the album was first released to the public, Scott was found dead in his car, apparently having drunk himself to death. Scott's death gave a new perspective to the lyrics of the album's title song, becoming more a representation of his life up to mortem, his literal "Highway to Hell." They show the carefree attitude when it comes to Scott's lifestyle, his so-called "fierce independence," and the company he kept during his hectic lifestyle. It is a physical manifestation of everything the singer stood for, making the song seem all the more alive, as Scott embraces his fate with enthusiasm.

Scott's lyrics on Highway to Hell deal almost exclusively with lust ("Love Hungry Man", "Girls Got Rhythm"), sex ("Beating Around the Bush", "Touch Too Much", "Walk All Over You"), and partying on the town ("Get It Hot", "Shot Down in Flames"). In his 2006 band memoir, Murray Engelheart reveals that Scott felt the lyrics of songs like "Gone Shootin'" from the preceding Powerage were "simply too serious."

"Touch Too Much" had been first recorded in July 1977, with a radically different arrangement and lyrics from its Highway to Hell incarnation. The final version was performed by Scott and AC/DC on the BBC music show Top of the Pops a few days before the singer's death in 1980. The song "If You Want Blood (You've Got It)" borrowed the title of the band's live album from the previous year and stemmed from Scott's response to a journalist at the Day on the Green festival in July 1978: when asked what they could expect from the band, Scott replied, "Blood".

The opening guitar riff of "Beating Around the Bush" has been referred to by journalist Phil Sutcliffe as "almost a tribute ... a reflection, I hesitate to say a copy" of "Oh Well" by Fleetwood Mac.

Asked in 1998, "What's the worst record you've ever made?", Angus replied: "There's a song on Highway to Hell called 'Love Hungry Man' which I must have written after a night of bad pizza – you can blame me for that."

"Night Prowler," the album's outro song, has gained a degree of infamy over the years, due to an alleged association with Los Angeles serial killer Richard Ramirez. Coined the "Night Stalker" by the media, Ramirez is accredited to a series of brutal murders, rapes, and attempted murders taking place from 1984 to 1985, and a claimed fan of AC/DC. Ramirez left behind an AC/DC hat at the scene of a murder, and according to friends of Ramirez, he had a particular love for the album and the song "Night Prowler." Ramirez himself never confirmed such an association. This alleged connection brought bad publicity to AC/DC, whose ensuing concerts and albums faced protests by parents and the general public. Despite backlash, the band had stated the song was given a murderous connotation by Ramirez's crimes, revealing on an episode of VH1's Behind the Music about AC/DC that the song was actually about a boy sneaking into his girlfriends bedroom at night while her parents are asleep, despite lyrics such as, "And you don't feel the steel, till it's hanging out your back."

== Release ==
Highway to Hell was originally released on 27 July 1979 by Albert Productions, who licensed the album to Atlantic Records for release outside of Australia, and it was re-released by Epic Records in 2003 as part of the AC/DC Remasters series. In Australia, the album was originally released with a slightly different album cover, featuring flames and a drawing of a bass guitar neck superimposed over the same photo of the band used on the international cover; also, the AC/DC logo is a darker shade of maroon, but the accents are a bit lighter. The East German release had different and much plainer designs for the front and back of the album, apparently because the authorities were not happy with the sleeve as released elsewhere.

== Reception ==
Retrospective professional reviews
Review scores
Source	Rating
AllMusic	5/5 stars
Blender	5/5 stars
Classic Rock	4.5/5 stars
The Encyclopedia of Popular Music	4/5 stars
The Great Rock Discography	8/10
MusicHound Rock	4.5/5 stars
Rolling Stone	4/5 stars
The Rolling Stone Album Guide	4.5/5 stars
Smash Hits	3/10
Spin Alternative Record Guide	7/10

The album became AC/DC's first LP to break the top 100 of the US Billboard 200 chart, eventually reaching number 17, and it propelled the band into the top ranks of hard rock acts. It is the second-highest selling AC/DC album (behind Back in Black) and is generally considered one of the greatest hard rock albums ever made. On 8 July 2024, the album was certified 8× Platinum by the RIAA.

Of the album, Greg Kot of Rolling Stone wrote: "The songs are more compact, the choruses fattened by rugby-team harmonies. The prize moment: Scott closes the hip-grinding 'Shot Down in Flames' with a cackle worthy of the Wicked Witch of the West." In a 2008 Rolling Stone cover story, David Fricke noted: "Superproducer 'Mutt' Lange sculpted AC/DC's rough-granite rock into chart-smart boogie on this album." AllMusic called the song "Highway to Hell" "one of hard rock's all-time anthems." The album was ranked number 199 on Rolling Stone magazine's 2003 list of the 500 greatest albums of all time; it was number 200 on the 2012 revised list. The 2010 book The 100 Best Australian Albums included Highway to Hell in the top 50 (Back in Black was No. 2).

In 2013, AC/DC fans Steevi Diamond and Jon Morter (who was behind a Rage Against the Machine Facebook campaign in 2009) spearheaded a Facebook campaign to make "Highway to Hell" a Christmas number one single on the UK Singles Chart, to celebrate the 40th anniversary of AC/DC, and to prevent The X Factor from achieving another number one hit single. The campaign raised funds for Feel Yourself, a testicular cancer-awareness charity. The song peaked at number four on the Official Singles Chart for Christmas that year, making it AC/DC's first-ever UK Top 10 single.

== Track listing ==
All tracks are written by Angus Young, Malcolm Young and Bon Scott.

Side one
No.	Title	Length
1.	"Highway to Hell"	3:29
2.	"Girls Got Rhythm"	3:24
3.	"Walk All Over You"	5:10
4.	"Touch Too Much"	4:28
5.	"Beating Around the Bush"	3:55

Side two
No.	Title	Length
6.	"Shot Down in Flames"	3:23
7.	"Get It Hot"	2:35
8.	"If You Want Blood (You've Got It)"	4:38
9.	"Love Hungry Man"	4:18
10.	"Night Prowler"	6:13
Total length:		41:33

== Personnel ==
AC/DC

- Bon Scott – lead vocals
- Angus Young – lead guitar
- Malcolm Young – rhythm guitar, backing vocals
- Cliff Williams – bass guitar, backing vocals
- Phil Rudd – drums

Production

- Robert John "Mutt" Lange – producer, backing vocals
- Mark Dearnley – recording engineer
- Tony Platt – mixing engineer
- Kevin Dallimore – assistant engineer
- Bob Defrin – art direction
- Jim Houghton – photography
- Recording studio: Roundhouse Recording Studios, London, England
- Mixing studio: Basing Street Studios, London, England

== Charts ==
=== Weekly charts ===
Chart (1979–1981)	Peak position
Australian Albums (Kent Music Report)	13
Canada Top Albums/CDs (RPM)	40
Dutch Albums (Album Top 100)	14
German Albums (Offizielle Top 100)	7
New Zealand Albums (RMNZ)	46
Norwegian Albums (VG-lista)	38
Swedish Albums (Sverigetopplistan)	24
UK Albums (Official Charts)	8
US Billboard 200	17

Chart (2007–2009)	Peak position
Australian Albums (ARIA)	27
Austrian Albums (Ö3 Austria)	38
Finnish Albums (Suomen virallinen lista)	37
Italian Albums (FIMI)	81
Spanish Albums (Promusicae)	67
Swiss Albums (Schweizer Hitparade)	57

Chart (2011)	Peak position
French Albums (SNEP)	135

Chart (2020)	Peak position
Belgian Albums (Ultratop Wallonia)	156

Chart (2024)	Peak position
German Albums (Offizielle Top 100)	2
Greek Albums (IFPI)	1
Hungarian Physical Albums (MAHASZ)	30
Polish Albums (ZPAV)	95
Swiss Albums (Schweizer Hitparade)	7
UK Rock & Metal Albums (Official Charts)	3

Chart (2026)	Peak position
Croatian International Albums (HDU)	11

=== Year-end charts ===
Chart (1980)	Position
German Albums (Offizielle Top 100)	4

== Certifications ==
Region	Certification	Certified units/sales
Argentina (CAPIF)	Gold	30,000^{^}
Australia (ARIA)	5× Platinum	350,000^{^}
Austria (IFPI Austria)	Gold	25,000^{*}
Canada (Music Canada)	9× Platinum	900,000^{‡}
Denmark (IFPI Danmark)	2× Platinum	40,000^{‡}
France (SNEP)	Platinum	400,000^{*}
Germany (BVMI) WEA	Platinum	500,000^{^}
Germany (BVMI) Eastwest Records	Gold	250,000^{^}
Italy (FIMI)	Platinum	50,000^{‡}
Mexico (AMPROFON)	Gold	100,000^{‡}
Poland (ZPAV)	2× Platinum	40,000^{‡}
Spain (Promusicae)	Gold	50,000^{^}
Switzerland (IFPI Switzerland)	Platinum	50,000^{^}
United Kingdom (BPI)	Platinum	300,000^{*}
United States (RIAA)	8× Platinum	8,000,000^{‡}
^{*} Sales figures based on certification alone.^{^} Shipments figures based on certification alone.^{‡} Sales+streaming figures based on certification alone.
