= Blackfeather =

Australian 1970s rock group

- Also known as: Feather
- Origin: Sydney, Australia
- Genres: Hard rock; progressive rock; blues rock; psychedelic rock
- Years active: 1970–1976, 1978, 1983, 2003–present
- Labels: Festival / Infinity, Calendar
- Members: Neale Johns; Harry Brus; Stuart Fraser; Gary Steel; Paul Wheeler
- Past members: see Members list below

Blackfeather are an Australian rock group that formed in April 1970. The band has had numerous line-ups, mostly fronted by its founding lead singer, Neale Johns. An early heavy rock version recorded their debut album, At the Mountains of Madness (April 1971), which peaked at number seven on the Go-Set Top 20 Albums chart. It provided the single "Seasons of Change" (May 1971), which was co-written by Johns with lead guitarist John Robinson. In July 1972, a piano-based line-up led by Johns issued an Australian number-one single, "Boppin' the Blues".

== History ==
Blackfeather formed in April 1970 in Sydney with John Robinson on lead guitar, Mike McCormack on drums, and Neale Johns on lead vocals. John Robinson said, "It was basically the Dave Miller Set without Dave." Robinson recalled meeting Johns, "a small guy with a huge voice, [Johns] was very taciturn. He was into the blues and had excellent range." Their name was derived from a book given to Robinson by a friend (Wayne Thomas of Flake) that contained about 500 possible band names including "Whitefeather" and "Heavyfeather" that inspired their decision. Corbett and McCormack left soon after, replaced by Robert Fortesque on bass guitar and Alexander Kash on drums. Corbett subsequently reunited with singer Dave Miller to record a duo album, Reflections of a Pioneer. Johns and Robinson wrote or co-wrote the band's original material.

Blackfeather became a popular hard rock group in Sydney and Melbourne and signed with Festival Records' newly founded progressive subsidiary, Infinity Records. They recorded their debut album, At the Mountains of Madness (April 1971) with co-production by Robinson and Richard Batchens (The Cleves). The album peaked at number seven on the Go-Set Top 20 Albums chart. Australian musicologist, Ian McFarlane, felt it "remains a highly regarded progressive rock album, highlighted by Robinson's fluid, inventive guitar technique and a swag of adventurous songs."

At the Mountains of Madness included the track, "Seasons of Change", co-written by Johns and Robinson. During recording, in late 1970, Robinson asked members of the group Fraternity, John Bissett and Bon Scott, to contribute to the album. Johns and Robinson gave Fraternity "Seasons of Change" to record as a single, with Scott on lead vocals. That group relocated to Adelaide and released it in March 1971, which peaked at number one on the local charts. Robinson had a verbal agreement with Infinity's David Sinclair that their label would not release the original Blackfeather version to compete with it. As soon as Fraternity's version began charting in Adelaide, Festival rush-released the Blackfeather variety as a single. It reached number 15 on the Go-Set National Top 40, charted for 16 weeks and was listed at number 40 on Go-Set's top singles for 1971.

Despite their success internal frictions escalated and there were further line-up changes. By August 1971 the line-up was Johns, Robinson, Harry Brus (ex-Dave Miller Set, Jeff St John's Copperwine) on bass guitar and Steve Webb on drums. Johns and Robinson parted ways and each fronted their own version of Blackfeather. Their former manager, Peter Conyngham of Nova Agency, had registered the Blackfeather name and thus owned its rights. He favoured the Johns-led variety with Jim Penson on drums, Warren Ward on bass guitar, Paul Wylde on piano and Alex "Zac" Zytnick (ex Tamam Shud) on lead guitar. The Robinson-led group included Brus and Webb; they struggled on as a trio for a short time before disbanding. Robinson worked with a studio group, Duck, in 1972 and then issued a solo album, Pity for the Victim (1974). He retired from performing in the 1980s and became a teacher and composer.

In early 1972 Blackfeather with Johns, Ward and Wylde were joined by Billy Taylor (ex Flake) on lead guitar. With Gil Matthews (of Billy Thorpe and the Aztecs) guesting on drums they recorded a new song called "Boppin' the Blues" (July 1972). It became a number-one hit in Australia in October for four weeks. In September of that year a four-piece line-up of Johns, Ward, Wylde and Greg Sheehan on drums were recorded live at Melbourne Town Hall and the Q Club for the second Blackfeather album, Boppin' the Blues. It was produced by Howard Gable and released in December 1972. McFarlane noticed they "relied on dominant boogie-woogie piano as a substitute for guitar."

Wylde quit at the end of 1972; he was replaced by two guitarists, Lindsay Wells (ex-Healing Force) and Tim Piper, which returned Blackfeather to the harder, guitar-based style of the Robinson-era group. They performed at the second Sunbury Pop Festival in January 1973. The set was released in the following year as another live album, Live! (Sunbury). A track, "I'm Gonna Love You", appeared on Mushroom Records' inaugural release, the triple-album, Sunbury 1973 – The Great Australian Rock Festival (April 1973). The third Blackfeather single, "Slippin; & Sliddin'", a cover of Little Richard's track, was issued in February 1973; by which time Sheehan had quit and the group split in April. Johns briefly performed solo before joining former bandmates Penson and Ward in Flake, which disbanded in late 1974.

Johns formed a new version of Blackfeather in 1975, with Taylor, Doug McDonald on drums, Billy Rylands on bass guitar and Ray Vanderby (ex-Band of Light) on keyboards; this line-up only lasted a short time. Early the next year Johns formed a more pop-oriented version, with Vanderby, Lee Brosman on bass guitar, Warwick Fraser on drums and his younger brother, Stuart Fraser on guitar (aged 14). Johns quit in November 1976 and travelled to the United Kingdom, while the remaining members picked up John Swan on lead vocals and Wayne Smith on guitar: they renamed the group as Feather. In mid-1977 Swan's younger brother, Jimmy Barnes, announced that he was quitting Cold Chisel to join Feather, but his farewell performance for Cold Chisel went so well that he decided to remain.

Johns, returned to Australia in 1977 and, after a brief stint with the band Fingerprint, in June of the following year he formed a new version of Blackfeather. It reunited him with the 1972 line-up of Ward, Wylde and Young. By October all except Johns had left, and were replaced by Ray Oliver on guitar (ex-Friends), Huk Treloar on drums (ex-Pantha, Bleeding Hearts, Living Legends), Rick Rankin on guitar and Geoff Rosenberg on bass guitar (ex-Hot Air Band). Ex-the Dingoes drummer John Strangio briefly replaced Treloar, but this version folded by the end of the year. In 1983 Johns formed another Blackfeather line-up with Andy Cowle on piano, Russell Hinton on guitar, Cleve Judge on bass guitar and Joe Vizzone on drums – but this also was short-lived.

Since 2003 Johns has occasionally performed using the Blackfeather name alongside Brendan Mason on guitar and Kerry McKenna on bass guitar (both ex-Madder Lake). This line up remained together until 2015. In 2010 Aztec Music re-released Boppin' the Blues in an expanded CD version. As of June 2015 Johns recruited two former Blackfeather members, Harry Brus on bass guitar and Stuart Fraser on guitar, along with Gary Steel on keyboards and Paul Wheeler on drums (ex-Icehouse). In that year Blackfeather toured Australia for the first time since 1983.

== Discography ==
=== Albums ===
List of albums, with selected chart positions
Title	Album details	Peak chart positions
Title	Album details	AUS
At the Mountains of Madness	Released: April 1971; Label: Infinity (SINL 934159)	14
Boppin' the Blues	Released: December 1972; Label: Infinity (INL 34731)	39
Live! (Sunbury)	Released: 1974; Label: Infinity (L25095)	–
Live 83', Sydney Australia	Released: June 2019; Label: Laneway Music	–

=== Singles ===
List of singles, with selected chart positions
Year	Title	Peak chart positions	Album
Year	Title	AUS	Album
1971	"Seasons of Change" / "On this Day That I Die"	11	At The Mountains of Madness
1972	"Boppin' the Blues" / "Find Somebody to Love"	1	Boppin' the Blues
1973	"Slippin' & Slidin'"/ "Fly on My Nose"	85	Live! (Sunbury)

== Awards and nominations ==
=== Go-Set Pop Poll ===
The Go-Set Pop Poll was coordinated by teen-oriented pop music newspaper, Go-Set, which was established in February 1966 and it conducted an annual poll during 1966 to 1972 of its readers to determine the most popular personalities.

Year	Nominee / work	Award	Result
1971	themselves	Best Group	10th
1971	John Robinson	Best Guitarist	6th
1971	John Robinson	Best Songwriter/Composer	10th
1971	At the Mountains of Madness	Best Album	9th
1972	themselves	Best Group	3rd
1972	"Boppin' the Blues"	Best Australian Single	1st

== Members ==
Original line-up:

- John Robinson (guitar) Apr 1970 – Aug 71
- Neale Johns (vocals) 1970–73, 1976, 1978, 1983
- Leith Corbett (bass) 1970
- Mike McCormack (drums) 1970

Mountains line-up:

- Robinson (guitar)
- Johns (vocals)
- Robert (Bob) Fortescue (bass) 1970–71
- Alexander (Al) Kash (drums) 1970–71

Late 1970– early 1971:

- Robinson (guitar)
- Johns (vocals)
- Robert (Bob) Fortescue (bass) 1970–71
- Harry Brus (bass, vocals) 1971
- Terry Gascoigne (drums) 1971
- Steve Webb (drums) 1970

Post-1971 line-ups to present day: Neale Johns (vocals), with

- Royston Johnson (Vocals) c. 1973–74
- Steve Murphy (guitar) 1970–71
- Lindsay Wells (guitar) 1970–71,1973
- Alex "Zac" Zytnik (guitar) Aug–Dec 1971
- Warren Ward (bass) 1971–73, 1978
- Paul Wylde (piano) 1971–73, 1978
- Warren Morgan (piano) late 1972
- Jim Penson (drums) 1971–72
- Billy Taylor (guitar) 1972, 1975
- Paul Gray 1972
- "Ginger"(Bob Evans) (drums 1972)
- Trevor Young (drums) 1972, 1978
- Greg Sheehan (drums) 1972–73, 1978
- Tim Piper (guitar) 1972/73
- John Lee (drums) 1973
- Ray Vanderby (kbds) 1975
- Ian Winter (guitar) 1975
- Ian Rilen (bass) 1975 –
- Billy Rylands (bass) -1975
- Doug McDonald (drums) 1975
- Lee Brossman (bass) 1976
- Rex Bullen (keyboards)
- Stuart Fraser (guitar) 1976
- Warwick Fraser (drums) 1976
- Wayne Smith (guitar) 1976
- Ray Oliver (guitar) 1978, 1983
- Derek Pelecci (drums)
- Rick Rankin (guitar) 1978
- Sam Righi (drums)
- Geoff Rosenberg (bass) 1978
- Gulliver Smith (vocals)
- Phil Smith (drums)
- John Strangio (bass) 1978
- Huk Treloar (drums) 1978
- John Tucak (bass)
- Tom ? (bass) 1983
- Andy Cowle (keyboards) 1983
- Cleve Judge (bass) 1983
- Joe Vizzone (drums) 1983
- Brenden Mason (guitar) 2003 – 2015
- Kerry McKenna (bass) 2003 – 2015
- Trevor Young (drums) 2003 – 2006
- Mick Holden (drums) 2006 – 2009
- Nic Carrafa (drums) 2009 – 2015
- Anthony Ziros (drums & vocals) 2017 – 2019
- Chris Ziros (guitars & vocals) 2017 – 2019
- Roger Mclachlan (bass & vocals) 2017 – 2019
