= Livestock (Fraternity album) =

Studio album by Fraternity
- Released: June 1971
- Recorded: 1970–1971
- Genres: Progressive rock; blues rock
- Length: 36:08 (LP version) 42:38 (CD version)
- Labels: Sweet Peach (LP), Connoisseur Collection (CD reissue)
- Producers: James Stewart; Doug Ashdown

Fraternity chronology
Livestock (1971)	Flaming Galah (1972)

Professional ratings
Review scores
Source	Rating
AllMusic	2/5 stars

Livestock is the first album by the Australian rock band Fraternity, released in 1971. Livestock is a largely progressive album, and was originally released on the Sweet Peach label, one of only ten albums ever released on it. Livestock was re-released for the first time on CD in 1998 with an alternative cover and three bonus tracks.

== Track listing ==
1. "Livestock" (Mick Jurd, John Bisset) – 3:39
2. "Summerville" (Bruce Howe, Sam See) – 4:22
3. "Raglan's Folly" (M. Jurd, Bon Scott) – 6:02
4. "Cool Spot" (M. Jurd, Bisset) – 4:53
5. "Grand Canyon Suites" (M. Jurd) – 4:53
6. "Jupiter's Landscape" (Howe, See) – 2:47
7. "You Have a God" (M. Jurd, Carol Jurd) – 2:27
8. "It" (Jimmy Stewart, Doug Ashdown) – 8:28

=== 1998 CD reissue ===
1. "The Race pt. 1" (Stewart, Ashdown) – 2:56 (Non-album single) *
2. "Seasons of Change" (John Robinson, Neale Johns) – 3:36 (single version) *
3. "Livestock" – 3:39
4. "Summerville" – 4:22
5. "Raglan's Folly" – 6:02
6. "Cool Spot" – 4:53
7. "Grand Canyon Suites" – 4:53
8. "Jupiter's Landscape" – 2:47
9. "You Have a God" – 2:27
10. "It" – 8:28
11. "The Race pt. 2" (Stewart, Ashdown) – 4:12 (B-side of track 1) *

(*) indicates bonus tracks.

== Charts ==
Chart (1972)	Peak position
Australian (Kent Music Report)	44

== Personnel ==
- Bon Scott – lead vocals, recorder
- Mick Jurd – lead guitar
- Bruce Howe – bass guitar
- John Bisset – keyboards
- John Freeman – drums
- "Uncle" John Eyers – harmonica on tracks 1 & 11 of the 1998 CD reissue
