= Fraternity (band) =

Australian band

- Fraternity: (L–R) Bruce Howe, Mick Jurd, John Freeman, John Bisset, Bon Scott

Background information
- Also known as: Fang
- Origin: Sydney, New South Wales, Australia
- Genres: Blues rock; progressive rock; boogie rock
- Years active: 1970–1973; 1974–1975
- Labels: Grape Organisation; Sweet Peach; Raven; RCA
- Past members: Bruce Howe; Mick Jurd; John Bisset; Tony Buettel; Bon Scott; John Freeman; John Eyers; Sam See; Mauri Berg; Peter Bersee; John Swan; Jimmy Barnes
- Website: fraternitybandofficial.com.au

Fraternity were an Australian rock band that formed in Sydney in 1970 and relocated to Adelaide in 1971. Former members include successive lead vocalists Bon Scott (who later joined AC/DC), John Swan (who also played drums and later had a solo career), and his brother Jimmy Barnes (Cold Chisel). Their biggest local hit was a cover version of "Seasons of Change", which peaked at No. 1 in Adelaide, but nationally it was overrun by the original Blackfeather version. The group won the 1971 Hoadley's Battle of the Sounds with the prize being a free trip to London. Fraternity went through various line-ups and was renamed as Fang (on British tour), Fraternity (again). In the late 70s some Fraternity former members created the bands Some Dream and Mickey Finn. Mickey Finn disbanded in 1992.

== History ==
Fraternity were formed in Sydney, New South Wales, Australia in early 1970 by four ex-members of the recently split Levi Smith's Clefs, John Bisset on keyboards and vocals, Tony Buettel on drums, Bruce Howe on bass guitar and vocals, and Mick Jurd on lead guitar. The band recorded their debut single, "Why Did It Have to Be Me" which was issued on the Sweet Peach label in October. Howe was looking for a lead vocalist and called on Bon Scott, whose group The Valentines had just disbanded. They signed with Nova Agencies who also managed Sydney rockers, Blackfeather and their guitarist John Robinson would often jam with Fraternity. Early gigs were at Jonathon's Disco on Broadway in Sydney.

Scott was invited to play recorder on the Blackfeather track "Seasons of Change" for that band's debut album, At the Mountains of Madness. John Freeman (Levi Smith's Clefs) replaced Buettel on drums and Fraternity recorded their debut album, Livestock, which was produced by Doug Ashdown and Jimmy Stewart. In October 1970, Fraternity toured with Jerry Lee Lewis. Whilst in Adelaide they signed with a new manager, Hamish Henry of The Grape Organisation. The band relocated to Adelaide by January 1971 and performed at the Myponga Music Festival which was also financed and staged by Hamish Henry. Fraternity also issued a new single, "Livestock" in January. They followed with their arrangement of "Seasons of Change" in March. The song sold well and became a No. 1 hit in Adelaide – it reached No. 51 on the retro-calculated Kent Music Report top100 singles chart. Upon learning of Fraternity's success in Adelaide, Blackfeather quickly released their version, which overran Fraternity's and reached No. 15 on the Go-Set national singles chart.

John Eyers (ex-No Sweat) joined on harmonica, recorder and vocals in May. Fraternity won the Hoadley's Battle of the Sounds – a national performance competition between the best bands representing each state – with the prize being a free trip to London. Scott's previous band, The Valentines, had been a finalist two years earlier. By September, Fraternity were touted as "The Next Big Band" by teen magazine, Go-Set. In 1971, Fraternity performed live versions of "Seasons of Change", "Sommerville" and "Raglan's Folly" on GTK (TV series). Sam See (Sherbet, The Flying Circus) joined on piano and slide guitar. They recorded their second album, Flaming Galah, produced by Hamish Henry's Grape Productions, which appeared in April 1972. The same year, Fraternity performed "Love 200" at the Adelaide Festival of Arts, a Peter Sculthorpe composition, featuring Jeannie Lewis and Melbourne Symphony Orchestra. By that time, the band had taken their trip to London and attempted to crack the United Kingdom market. Bisset left to return to Australia and was followed out of the band by See who rejoined The Flying Circus (now based in Canada).

Fraternity were renamed as Fang in early 1973, but the band had stalled and was gradually disintegrating, with the remaining members returning to Australia by the year's end. Some members joined the loosely knit Mount Lofty Rangers project with fellow Adelaide-based Headband members. Scott recorded a couple of songs with Mount Lofty Rangers after being seriously injured in a motorcycle accident in early 1974. When Scott had recovered, he joined heavy rockers AC/DC in Sydney.

Late in 1974, Fraternity reformed with Eyers, Freeman, and Howe joined by Mauri Berg (Headband) on guitar, Pieter Bersee on violin and John Swan (Hard Time Killing Floor, Pulse, James Wright Group) on lead vocals. In mid-1975, Freeman left and Swan switched to drums with his younger brother, Jimmy Barnes (Cold Chisel) joining on lead vocals. Late in 1975, Barnes returned to Cold Chisel and Fraternity disbanded. John Swan, under the name Swanee, had a solo career. Bruce Howe, John Freeman, Mick Jurd and Pieter Bersee formed 'Some Dream', whilst John Eyers, Mauri Berg formed Mickey Finn with drummer Joff Bateman (Headband) and bassist Bill McMahon. Mickey Finn later consisted of Eyers, Berg, Howe and Freeman. By 1980, a second guitarist, Stan Koritni had joined. They recorded a self-titled album in 1980 for the Eureka label.

== After Fraternity ==
After Cold Chisel split in 1983, Jimmy Barnes would invite Howe to join his solo band as bassist. Howe would go on to record Bodyswerve and For The Working Class Man albums and tour with Barnes until 1986. Bruce met former Rose Tattoo guitarist Rockin' Rob Riley while working in Jimmy Barnes' band. Bruce and Rob would form their own band Megaboys with Steve McLennan on drums.

Upon returning to Australia, Sam See formed Stockley, See and Mason in 1978 with Chris Stockley and Glyn Mason. Since then Sam has been a musical director, production and guitarist for a wide array of artists including John Farnham, Goanna, The Black Sorrows, Swanee, Ross Wilson, Daryl Braithwaite, Brian Cadd, Broderick Smith, Rose Bygrave, Olivia Newton-John, Tina Arena, Glenn Shorrock, Dale Ryder, Debra Byrne, Thelma Houston, Men at Work, Marie Wilson, Jane Saunders, Joe Camilleri and the Under the Southern Stars concert.

John Bisset parted with Fraternity in 1973, when the group temporarily renamed themselves Fang. A majority of Fraternity would move back to Australia, but John Bisset remained in England. John had a short stint in Mungo Jerry before becoming a dairy farmer for Headley Farm, a polisher for Ronson Cigarettes, a rugby player and a computer programmer for Pepper Construction (Saudi Arabia) and Shell Oil. In 1981, John returned to Sydney and met bassist Bill McMahon through Fraternity bandmate John. John Bisset and Bill McMahon recruited guitarist Brett Hamlyn, vocalist Terry Barker and drummer John Affleck becoming Diamond Cutter. Diamond Cutter were signed to CBS records for a recording contract. John returned to New Zealand in late 1983. Throughout the 1980s, John battled his demons and found Christianity. By 1988 John Bisset had formed a new version of his first band The Mods with Kevin McNeil. The Mods II played the pubs around Hamilton, Tauranga, Rotorua and South Auckland. John returned to playing the guitar and discovered his love for blues style music. In 2001, John was recruited by Bryon Steenson's River Rockers and played many pub gigs and jazz and blues festivals with them until February 2007. John Bisset still writes and records music today in his Hurtle Music Studio.

Mick Jurd remained in England gaining employment as a sales rep and picked up some work in playing local bands. After some close calls with IRA bombings, Mick and his wife Carol returned to Australia in mid 1974. After moving back to Sydney, Mick would start performing again with jazz player Jim Kelly playing at venues such as The Basement. Mick's job as a sales rep required him to move back to Adelaide in 1975, where he would join a reformed Red Angel Panic with Fraternity bandmate John Freeman. Bruce Howe's Fraternity MK II had split after the departure of Jimmy Barnes and John Swan, he formed jazz rock outfit Some Dream in 1977 inviting Mick and John Freeman to join. Mick no longer wanted to tour and Bruce left Some Dream to join Mickey Finn. Mick left Some Dream just as it was falling apart and moved back to Sydney, continuing to perform until his death on 3 June 1992.

After his time working with members of Fraternity, Pieter Bersee was a well sought after performer and worked as a session musician on a number of well known Australian albums for artists including David Campbell, Grace Knight and Renee Geyer. Pieter went on to become second violinist in the Sydney Symphony Orchestra and died on 22 November 2008.

After Fraternity split, Bon Scott had a motor bike accident and gradually went back to doing odd jobs. His friend Vince Lovegrove from The Valentines had heard from former Easybeat George Young that an up-and-coming band from Sydney called AC/DC were looking for a new singer. Vince got Bon to join the band onstage at the Pooraka Hotel (now The Bridgeway) in Adelaide and there was an instant bond over Little Richard, Chuck Berry, and the shared Scottish roots of the young brothers, Angus and Malcolm. From 1974 to 1979, AC/DC released an astonishing catalog of six studio albums. Songs like It’s A Long Way to the Top (If You Wanna Rock n Roll), Big Balls, Dirty Deeds Done Dirt Cheap, T.N.T., Jailbreak, Let There Be Rock, Whole Lotta Rosie and of course Highway To Hell are undisputed classics in rock history. Bon Scott died on 19 February 1980, just weeks after the conclusion of the Highway To Hell tour. Over 40 years later, Bon is heralded as one of rock's greatest front men of all time.

Bruce Howe died on 29 January 2025, at the age of 77.

John Freeman died on 17 April 2026, at the age of 76.

== 50th Anniversary and acknowledgments ==
In 2021, newly unheard material uncovered by music historian Victor Marshall through his work with Fraternity and their manager Hamish Henry was released. Marshall also released a book with the band 'Fraternity: Pub Rock Pioneers' in March 2021 through Brolga and Simon and Schuster publishing.

On 30 January 2021, a plaque celebrating Hamish Henry's 1971 Myponga Music Festival was erected by the Myponga Historical Society near the original site of the event. The plaque pays tribute to both Henry and Fraternity, along with all the other bands who participated.

On 18 March 2021, The Grape Organisation held a Fraternity 50th Anniversary concert held at Adelaide's historic Thebarton Theatre.

To celebrate Bon Scott's 75th birthday, members of Fraternity contributed testimonials to a newly launched site by the Bon Scott Estate. These included stories and anecdotes from Sam See, Tony Buettel, Bruce Howe, John Bisset and John Freeman.

In May 2022, Bruce Howe of Fraternity and Fraternity author Victor Marshall were featured on ABC's Australian Story 'Bon Scott: On The Brink'.

In April 2023, the Grape Organisation reissued Flaming Galah on a limited edition green vinyl for record store day.

Today, Fraternity continue to be managed by Hamish Henry & The Grape Organisation Pty Ltd, alongside co-director Victor Marshall.

== Members ==
- Mick Jurd – guitars (1970–3; died 1992)
- John Bisset – keyboards, backing vocals (1970–3); lead vocals (1970–1)
- Bruce Howe – bass, backing vocals (1970–3, 1974–5; died 2025); lead vocals (1970–1)
- Tony Buettel – drums (1970–1971)
- Bon Scott – lead vocals, recorder, percussion (1971–3; died 1980)
- "Uncle" John Eyers – harmonica, backing vocals, recorder (1971–3, 1974–5)
- Sam See – slide guitar, piano (1971–3)
- John Freeman – drums (1971–3, 1974)
- John Swan – lead vocals (1974); drums, backing vocals (1975)
- Pieter Bersee – violin (1974–1975; died 2008)
- Mauri Berg – guitars (1974–5)
- Jimmy Barnes – lead vocals (1975)

== Discography ==
=== Studio albums ===
List of albums, with selected chart positions
Title	Album details	Peak chart positions
Title	Album details	AUS
Livestock	Released: June 1971; Format: LP; Label: Sweet Peach (SP 113)	51
Flaming Galah	Released: April 1972; Format: LP; Label: RCA Victor (SL 102038)	28

=== Compilation albums ===
List of compilations albums, with selected chart positions
Title	Album details
Complete Sessions 1971–72	Released: March 1996; Format: 2xCD; Label: Raven records
Seasons of Change	Released: 2003; Format: 2xCD; Label: Delta records
Seasons of Change - The Complete Recordings 1970-1974	Released: January 2021; Format: 3xCD; Label: Cherry Red records

=== Singles ===
List of singles, with selected chart positions
Year	Title	Peak chart positions
Year	Title	AUS
1970	"Why Did It Have to Be Me" / "Question"	—
1971	"Seasons of Change" / "Summerville"	51
1971	"The Race (pt 1)" / "The Race (pt 2)"	—
1971	"If You Got It" / "Raglan's Folly" / "You Have a God"	66
1971	"Livestock" / "Why Did It Have to Be Me" / "Cool Spot"	—
1972	"Welfare Boogie" / "Getting Off"	—

=== Other songs ===
- "Raglan's Folly" (Scott, Jurd) (live at GTK (TV series), 1971)
- "Seasons of Change" (Robinson, Johns) (live at GTK, 1971)
- "Somerville" (Howe, See) (live at GTK, 1971)
- "Love 200" (Sculthorpe) (live feat. Jeannie Lewis and Melbourne Symphony Orchestra, 1972)
- "Second Chance" (Berg, Howe, Freeman, Eyers) (Bruce Howe on vocals, 1974)
- "One Night Stand" (Berg, Howe, Eyers, Barnes, Swan, Bersee) (Jimmy Barnes on vocals, 1975)
- "Floyd's Hotel" (J. Geils Band) (Jimmy Barnes on vocals, 1975)
