= The Robertson Brothers =

Australian band

- Origin: Australia
- Genres: Pop, theme music, rock
- Years active: 1992–present
- Labels: BMG, EMI Sony,
- Members: Geoff Robertson; Ben Robertson; Stuart Robertson
- Past members: Anton Aktila
- Website: RobertsonBrothers.com.au

The Robertson Brothers is an Australian band of brothers who are best known for singing the Home and Away theme song, broadcast from 2000 to 2006.

At the ARIA Music Awards of 1994, their debut single "I Know Why" was nominated for ARIA Award for Best New Talent.

The Robertson Brothers have been performing just on 30 years; including appearing at the Sydney 2000 Olympic Games Opening Ceremony, singing the Channel 7 'Home and Away' theme song, plus as backing vocalists on Australia's top rating talent show, Australian Idol.

== Discography ==
=== Studio albums ===
List of studio albums, with selected details and chart positions
Title	Album details	Peak chart positions
Title	Album details	AUS
Symmetry	Released: August 1994; Label: RCA (74321220652); Format: CD, cassette	44
Here	Released: 2002; Label: Transistor Music Australia (CCBK7048); Format: CD	—
Flight 1974	Released: July 2008; Label: Destra Music (CDR1137); Format: CD, digital download	98
Sharing the Night	Released: 2009; Label: SONY Music; Format: CD	—
Celebrating the Hits of The Everly Brothers	Released: February 2015; Label: SONY Music; Format: CD	54
1960's Variety TV Show Vol. 1	Released: Label: Robinson Brothers (RBVS01); Format: CD	—
1960's Variety TV Show Vol. 2	Released: Label: Robinson Brothers (RBVS02); Format: CD	—

=== Live albums ===
List of live albums released, with release date and label details shown
Title	Album details
Live in Binyang	Released: 2005; Label: Line 5 Records (RB03); Format: CD

=== Singles ===
List of singles, with year released and selected chart positions
Title	Year	Peak chart positions	Album
Title	Year	AUS	Album
"I Know Why"	1993	47	Symmetry
"Winter in America"	1994	—	Symmetry
"Send a Message"	1994	68	Symmetry
"Can't Cry Hard Enough"	1994	—	Symmetry
"The Last Love Song"	1999	50	Here
"Call Me Back"/"I Believe"	2002	83	Here
"Here"/"Over the Mountains"	2003	64	Here
"Daddy's Gone"	2005	56	Live in Binyang
"Language of Heaven"	2008	—	Flight 1974
"Not Beautiful"	2008	—	Flight 1974
"A Million Ways"	2009	—	Flight 1974
"Sharing the Night"	2009	—	Sharing the Night
"You Saved My Life"	2013	—	Non-album single

== Members ==
- Geoff Robertson (1992–present)
- Ben Robertson (1992–present)
- Stuart Robertson (1992–2004 & 2019–present)
- Anton Aktila (2004–2011)

== Awards ==
=== ARIA Music Awards ===
The ARIA Music Awards is an annual awards ceremony that recognises excellence, innovation, and achievement across all genres of Australian music.

Year	Nominee / work	Award	Result
1994	"I Know Why"	Best New Talent	Won

=== Mo Awards ===
The Australian Entertainment Mo Awards (commonly known informally as the Mo Awards), were annual Australian entertainment industry awards. They recognise achievements in live entertainment in Australia from 1975 to 2016. The Robertson Brothers won eight awards in that time.

Year	Nominee / work	Award	Result (wins only)
2000	The Robertson Brothers	Variety Duo/Trio of the Year	Won
2001	The Robertson Brothers	Variety Duo/Trio of the Year	Won
2002	The Robertson Brothers	Variety Duo/Trio of the Year	Won
2003	The Robertson Brothers	Variety Duo/Trio of the Year	Won
2007	The Robertson Brothers	Variety Duo/Trio of the Year	Won
2008	The Robertson Brothers	Vocal Group of the Year	Won
2009	The Robertson Brothers	Vocal Group of the Year	Won
2012	The Robertson Brothers	Best Harmony/ Vocal Group of the Year	Won
