= Girls Got Rhythm =

1979 single by AC/DC

Single by AC/DC

from the album Highway to Hell
- B-side: "Get It Hot (UK); T.N.T. (Ger.)"
- Released: 2 November 1979
- Recorded: March – April 1979
- Studio: Roundhouse (London)
- Genre: Heavy metal; hard rock; blues rock
- Length: 3:23
- Label: Atlantic
- Songwriters: Angus Young; Malcolm Young; Bon Scott
- Producer: Mutt Lange

AC/DC singles chronology
| "Highway to Hell" (1979) | "Girls Got Rhythm" (1979) | "Touch Too Much" (1980) |

"Girls Got Rhythm" is a song by Australian rock band AC/DC. It is found on their 1979 album Highway to Hell. The song was released as a single the same year.

A British EP was also released in 1979 containing the songs: A1. "Girl's Got Rhythm"; A2. "If You Want Blood (You've Got It)"; B1. "Hell Ain't a Bad Place to Be" (live; taken from If You Want Blood); B2. "Rock 'n' Roll Damnation" (live; taken from If You Want Blood).

== Reception ==
Smash Hits said, "Well, I'm lost for words. There's this absurd man screeching about all the girls he seen all over the world and a riff that I think I've heard before. It was either 1974 or 1975."

== Other appearances ==
A live version can be found on the live album Let There Be Rock: The Movie, part of the Bonfire box set. A video of the band performing the song is on the DVD Family Jewels.

The song is also featured in the 2006 film DOA: Dead or Alive.

== Personnel ==
- Bon Scott – lead vocals
- Angus Young – lead guitar
- Malcolm Young – rhythm guitar, backing vocals
- Cliff Williams – bass guitar, backing vocals
- Phil Rudd – drums

== Certifications ==
Certifications for "Girls Got Rhythm"
| Region | Certification | Certified units/sales |
|---|---|---|
| Canada (Music Canada) | Gold | 40,000^{‡} |
^{‡} Sales+streaming figures based on certification alone.
