= Vince Lovegrove =

Australian musician, band manager, journalist and AIDS activist

- Born: Vincent James Lovegrove; 19 March 1947; Claremont, Western Australia
- Died: 24 March 2012 (aged 65); Bangalow, New South Wales, Australia
- Years active: 1966–2012
- Spouse(s): Helen Corkhill (m. 1972–1979); Suzi Sidewinder (m. 1985–1987); Caroline Thompson (m. 1994–1997)
- Musical career

Vincent James Lovegrove (19 March 1947 – 24 March 2012) was an Australian musician, journalist, music manager, television producer and AIDS awareness pioneer. He was a member of 1960s rock 'n' roll band The Valentines, sharing vocals with Bon Scott whom he later introduced to heavy rock group AC/DC. As a journalist, he wrote for Australia's teen music newspaper Go-Set from 1971, and was based in London for Immedia! from 1994 for over eight years. As a manager, his former clients include pub rock singer Jimmy Barnes and rock group Divinyls.

Both his second wife, Suzi Sidewinder, and their son, Troy Lovegrove, died of HIV/AIDS; each was the subject of documentaries by Lovegrove, Suzi's Story (1987) and A Kid Called Troy (1993) respectively, which were telecast on Australian TV and internationally. He wrote A kid called Troy: The moving journal of a little boy's battle for life in 1993, and an unauthorized biography of INXS frontman Michael Hutchence in 1999.

Lovegrove died in a car accident near Byron Bay, New South Wales on 24 March 2012.

== 1966–70: The Valentines ==
Vince James Lovegrove was born on 19 March 1947 at the Devonleigh Hospital, Claremont, Western Australia, to Betty (née Fry) and Dudley Lovegrove and grew up in Applecross, Western Australia with his sisters Christine and Sue. He became a singer for Perth pop groups, The Dynells (as a 14-year-old Applecross High School student), The Dimensions and The Winstons, while working as a sales assistant at Pellew's Menswear. In mid-1966, he formed The Valentines, as co-lead singer with Bon Scott from rival band, The Spektors. Other original members were, Wyn Milson on lead guitar (Spektors), Ted Ward on rhythm guitar (Winstons), John Cooksey on bass guitar (Winstons) and Warwick Findlay on drums (Ray Hoff and the Off Beats). The Valentines recorded several songs written by George Young and Harry Vanda of The Easybeats. Their cover of the Arthur Alexander song "Every Day I Have to Cry" made the Perth top 5. In 1970, they gained a place on the National Top 30 with their single "Juliette". In September 1970, The Valentines were the first Australian band arrested for marijuana possession, each member received a fine of $150 and were put on a good behaviour bond. The Valentines disbanded due to artistic differences after the much-publicised drug scandal. Scott went on to join Fraternity and later AC/DC.

== 1970s: Journalism, band management and television production ==
Lovegrove moved to Adelaide in 1970 as a journalist for a magazine, and by 1971 he was writing for Go-Set, Australia's first pop music weekly newspaper, as a gossip and information columnist. In 1971, for a few months, he was the singer of the Abacus. He also had a brief solo career, with a single in 1971, "Livestock" (with b-side "Rented Room Blues") followed by "Get Myself Out of This Place" (with b-side "That's Alright Momma") in 1972. These songs were reissued in 2021 on Fraternity "Seasons of Change – The Complete Recordings 1970–1974" 3CD boxset. He was a vocalist for Mount Lofty Rangers in early 1974, which included members of Fraternity and his former bandmate Bon Scott. With his first wife Helen Corkhill, he also ran a band management and booking agency, Jovan, in Adelaide in the 1970s. According to Lovegrove, Scott was given odd jobs in their office and was recommended to Angus Young and Malcolm Young as vocalist for their band AC/DC. Jovan briefly managed AC/DC (now with Scott as vocalist) and Cold Chisel (with Jimmy Barnes, ex-Fraternity). Becoming a parent and other factors led him to concentrate on journalism and television production including compering local TV show, The Move. From 1977, Lovegrove helped develop and broadcast Australian Music to the World for Adelaide radio station, 5KA, and in 1978 produced a TV documentary of the same title. Lovegrove relocated to Melbourne, reported on youth issues for Nine Network's A Current Affair and produced The Don Lane Show in 1978.

== 1980s: Divinyls, Suzi, Troy and AIDS ==
In 1981, Lovegrove moved to Sydney and became manager of the rock band Divinyls. he organised their transfer from WEA to Chrysalis and their first tours of the United States. Lovegrove had a minor role in the film, Monkey Grip (1982), and Divinyls' members Christina Amphlett and Mark McEntee supplied the soundtrack. As manager of Divinyls, he split his time between Sydney and New York City to promote them and, during one of his many trips, Lovegrove met his future second wife, American-born actress Suzi Sidewinder.

After living together for four years, Lovegrove married Sidewinder but, not long after the birth of their son Troy Lovegrove in 1985, the family learnt that both mother and child were HIV-positive. Suzi had unknowingly contracted HIV several years earlier and had transmitted the virus to the unborn Troy. In response to experiencing prejudice and ignorance due to AIDS, Lovegrove and Suzi chose to speak out and developed the documentary Suzi's Story. It won the Television Documentary Award at the 1987 Human Rights Medal and Awards. and assisted to dispel public's fears, ignorance and belief that HIV was a "gay disease".

Because of personal pressure arising from the HIV status of his wife and son, Lovegrove withdrew from managing the Divinyls, and concentrated on his wife and son. Suzi died on 14 June 1987, weeks before Suzi's Story was screened on Network Ten across Australia. It featured interviews with Suzi Lovegrove and Holly Lovegrove (his daughter from his first marriage), and footage of Troy.

== 1990s ==
Lovegrove's son Troy surpassed his expected life span of 5 years after development of new anti-viral drugs, Troy became an HIV awareness campaigner, and was the subject of another documentary, A Kid Called Troy, which was made for Australian Broadcasting Corporation (ABC) Australia. Troy died on 3 June 1993—three weeks before his 8th birthday and before it was screened nationally. Lovegrove also wrote A kid called Troy: The moving journal of a little boy's battle for life in 1993. Not long after, Lovegrove was manager for Jimmy Barnes on his European tour. He was then based in London as a journalist for Immedia! from 1994 for over eight years, reporting on the music scene for the on-line magazine.

After the 1997 death of INXS frontman, Michael Hutchence, Lovegrove wrote an unauthorised biography, Michael Hutchence: Shining Through, Torn Apart (aka Michael Hutchence: A Tragic Rock 'n' Roll Story—a definitive biography) in 1999. The book was the subject of a libel action in both Sydney and London, brought by Hutchence's domestic partner, Paula Yates.

Lovegrove alleged that Yates had deceived Hutchence and used her pregnancy to ensnare him. The libel case was settled for an undisclosed amount by the book's Sydney and London publishers, and the UK newspaper The Mail on Sunday, which had serialised parts in April 1999.

== 2000s ==
In July 2006 Lovegrove wrote a profile of his friend Bon Scott for The Australian newspaper. This commemorated what would have been Scott's 60th birthday (Scott died in 1980). His band, Mongrels of Passion, featured alongside Noiseworks and Rose Tattoo at the Bon Scott Statue unveiling in Fremantle in February 2008. In 2007, Mongrels of Passion had released their eponymous 5track-CD. Mongrels of Passion, including Lovegrove and Tim Gaze performed at the 2008 Adelaide International Guitar Festival held on 29 November – 7 December. In 2009, Mongrels of Passion released their 2nd 5track-CD called "Mongrels of Passion 2".

== Personal life ==
Lovegrove was married three times. His first marriage (1972–1979) was to Helen Corkhill, who assisted him in running band management and booking agency Jovan in Adelaide in the 1970s. They are the parents of Holly Lovegrove (born 1975). His second wife, Suzi Sidewinder, lived with Lovegrove from 1981 to their marriage in 1985, up until her death from HIV/AIDS on 14 June 1987, which is depicted in an award-winning documentary, Suzi's Story, shown on Network Ten in Australia. Their son, Troy Lovegrove (born 25 June 1985), contracted HIV in utero and died on 3 June 1993. His third marriage, to Caroline Thompson (1994–1997) resulted in his youngest child, Lilli-Rae (born 1995). In 1997, Thompson left Lovegrove and Lilli-Rae. Lovegrove has two other sons, Jason and Jo. Until his death, Lovegrove lived at Rosebank about 30 km west of Byron Bay, New South Wales with his daughter Lilli-Rae, not far from his elder daughter Holly and her sons Arlo (born 1996) and Marlon (2011).

=== Death ===
On 24 March 2012, Vince Lovegrove died, aged 65, in a car accident at Federal, near Bangalow, New South Wales, about 20 km west (inland) of Byron Bay. A preliminary police report on 25 March indicated that Lovegrove's Kombi Van left Binna Burra Road, rolled and exploded into flames between 1 am and 3 am the previous day. There was one deceased person in the van and positive identification of Lovegrove's body was delayed. On 26 March, Lovegrove's family issued a statement confirming his death and that they were planning a public memorial and funeral services. On 28 March, he had been due to start work as a journalist at Lismore's The Northern Star.

== Bibliography ==
Lovegrove has written, co-written or edited the following:

- Lovegrove, Vincent (1993). A kid called Troy: The moving journal of a little boy's battle for life. Sydney, NSW: ABC Books for Australian Broadcasting Corporation. ISBN 978-0-7333-0346-3.
- Lovegrove, Vincent (1999). Michael Hutchence: a tragic Rock 'n' Roll Story – a definitive biography. St Leonards, NSW: Allen & Unwin. ISBN 978-1-86448-894-4.
- Lovegrove, Vincent (1999). Michael Hutchence : shining through, torn apart. London, UK: Faber. ISBN 978-0-571-20021-4.
