= The Valentines (rock band) =

Australian rock band (1966–1970)

- The Valentines c. 1969: (L–R) Wyn Milsom, Bon Scott, Vince Lovegrove, Paddy Beach, Ted Ward

Background information
- Origin: Perth, Western Australia
- Genres: Pop, rock
- Years active: 1966–1970
- Label: Clarion
- Past members: Bon Scott; Vince Lovegrove; Wyn Milsom; Ted Ward; Bruce Abbott; Warwick Findlay; John Cooksey; Doug Lavery; Paddy Beach

The Valentines were an Australian pop band active from 1966 to 1970, chiefly noted for their lead singers, Bon Scott, who later went on to success as lead vocalist with AC/DC, and Vince Lovegrove, who subsequently became a successful music journalist and manager of Divinyls. The band released two extended plays during their run, The Valentines (1968) and My Old Man's a Groovy Old Man (1969). They also released eight singles, including five charting singles, their highest-charting being 1969's "Nick Nack Paddy Whack", which peaked at number 53 on the Australian Singles Chart.

== Background ==
The band was formed in late 1966 with the amalgamation of Perth groups The Spektors and The Winstons. They capitalised on the success of both the former bands, plus the interest created by having two lead singers in Scott and Lovegrove. Inspired by The Rolling Stones, The Beatles, and local stars The Easybeats, they enjoyed considerable local success and released a few singles.

In late 1967, The Valentines moved to Melbourne in search of greater success, and soon toured other major cities. With a development towards the popular Bubblegum sound late in 1968, the band became more in demand, particularly among teenage girls. However, as the fashion for bubblegum music wore off, The Valentines struggled to retain their musical credibility despite a turn towards rock music. With differing opinions within the band concerning musical direction, and a much-publicised drugs bust in September 1969, group stability began to suffer. Although they still had a strong fanbase in certain areas of the country, especially back home in Perth, The Valentines decided to disband amicably in August 1970.

Scott had built a strong reputation as a powerful vocalist and soon joined Fraternity, and later AC/DC. Lovegrove found success as a music journalist, and guitarist Wyn Milsom became a sound engineer.

== Personnel ==
- Bon Scott – vocals (1966–1970; died 1980)
- Vince Lovegrove – vocals (1966–1970; died 2012)
- Wyn Milsom – guitar (1966–1970)
- Ted Ward – guitar (1966–1969), bass guitar (1969–1970)
- Bruce Abbott – bass guitar (1966–1968)
- Warwick Findlay – drums (1966–1968)
- John Cooksey – bass guitar (1968–1969)
- Doug Lavery – drums (1968–1969)
- Paddy Beach – drums (1969–1970)

== Discography ==
=== Compilation albums ===
Title	Album details
The Early Years (as Bon Scott with The Valentines & Fraternity)	Released: 1987; Format: CD, LP; Label: See for Miles (SEE CD 247)
Peculiar Hole in the Sky	Released: 2003; Format: CD; Label: Ascension Records (CDANSI 03)
The Sound of the Valentines	Released: 2016; Format: CD, LP; Label: RPM Records (RPM531)
1967-1970	Released: August 2020; Format: LP; Label: Demon Records (DEMREC665)

=== Extended plays ===
Title	EP details
The Valentines	Released: 1968; Format: LP; Label: Clarion Records (MCX-11,472)
My Old Man's a Groovy Old Man	Released: February 1969; Format: LP; Label: Philips (PE-81)

=== Singles ===
List of singles, with Australian chart positions
Year	Title	Peak chart positions
Year	Title	AUS
1967	"Every Day I Have to Cry" (Arthur Alexander) / "I Can't Dance with You" (Steve Marriott, Ronnie Lane)	76
1967	"She Said" (George Young, Stevie Wright) / "To Know You Is to Love You" (Phil Spector)	98
1968	"I Can Hear the Raindrops" (Ted Ward, Vince Lovegrove) / "Why Me?" (Ward, Lovegrove)	-
1968	"Peculiar Hole in the Sky" (Harry Vanda, Young) / "Love Makes Sweet Music" (Kevin Ayers)	-
1969	"Ebeneezer" (Rick Price, Mike Tyler) / "My Old Man's a Groovy Old Man" (Vanda, Young)	100
1969	"My Old Man's a Groovy Old Man" (Vanda, Young) / "Ebeneezer" (Rick Price, Mike Tyler)	22
1969	"Nick Nack Paddy Whack" (Lovegrove, Bon Scott, Ted Junko (Ward), John Cooksey, Paddy Beach, Wyn Milsom) / "Getting Better" (Scott, Milsom)	53
1970	"Juliette" (Milsom, Ward, Scott) / "Hoochie Coochie Billy" (Lovegrove, Ward, Milsom)	28

=== Other songs ===
- "Sooky Sooky" (Don Covay) – (1968)
- "Build Me Up Buttercup" (Mike d'Abo, Tony Macaulay) – (live TV appearance 1969)
- "Things Go Better with Coke" (Coca-Cola jingle) – (1969)
