= Bon Scott =

Scottish and Australian singer (1946–1980)

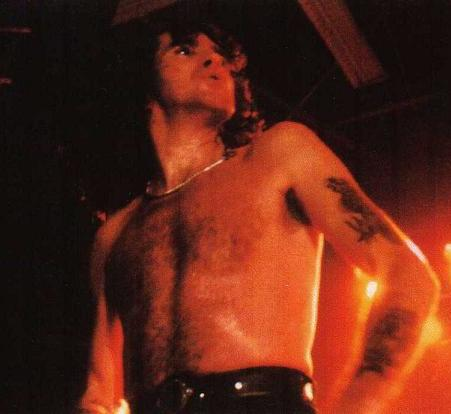
- Scott performing with AC/DC in December 1979

Background information
- Born: Ronald Belford Scott; 9 July 1946; Forfar, Angus, Scotland
- Origin: Fremantle, Western Australia, Australia
- Died: 19 February 1980 (aged 33) East Dulwich, London, England
- Genres: Rock and roll; blues rock; hard rock
- Occupations: Singer; songwriter
- Years active: 1964–1980
- Formerly of: AC/DC; Fraternity; The Valentines; The Spektors
- Spouse: Irene Thornton (m. 1972; div. 1977)
- Website: bonscottofficial.com

Ronald Belford "Bon" Scott (9 July 1946 – 19 February 1980) was an Australian singer who was the second lead vocalist and lyricist of the hard rock band AC/DC from 1974 until his death in 1980. In the July 2004 issue of Classic Rock, Scott was ranked number one in a list of the "100 Greatest Frontmen of All Time". Hit Parader ranked Scott as fifth on their 2006 list of the 100 Greatest Heavy Metal Vocalists of all time.

Born in Forfar in Angus, Scotland, Scott spent his early years in Kirriemuir. He moved to Australia with his family in 1952 at the age of six, living in Melbourne for four years before settling in the Perth neighbourhood of Fremantle, Western Australia, then Adelaide, South Australia in his later years. Scott formed his first band, the Spektors, in 1964 and became the band's drummer and occasional lead vocalist. He performed in several other bands, including the Valentines and Fraternity, before replacing original AC/DC lead singer Dave Evans in 1974.

With AC/DC, Scott performed on the band's first seven albums: High Voltage (1975, Oceania only release), T.N.T. (1975, Oceania only release), High Voltage (1976, first international release), Dirty Deeds Done Dirt Cheap (1976, not released until 1981 in the United States), Let There Be Rock (1977), Powerage (1978) and Highway to Hell (1979). AC/DC's popularity grew throughout the 1970s, initially in Australia, and then internationally. Their 1979 album Highway to Hell reached the top 20 in the United States, and was their commercial breakthrough. However, on 19 February 1980, Scott died after a night out in London with former musician and alleged drug dealer Alistair Kinnear. AC/DC briefly considered disbanding, but the group recruited vocalist Brian Johnson of the British glam rock band Geordie. AC/DC's subsequent album, Back in Black, was released only five months later, and was a tribute to Scott. It is currently the second-best-selling album of all time.

== Biography ==
=== 1946–1964: Early years ===
Ronald Belford Scott was born on 9 July 1946 at Fyfe Jamieson Maternity Hospital in Forfar, Scotland, to Charles Belford "Chick" Scott (1917–1999) and Isabelle Cunningham "Isa" Mitchell (1917–2011). He grew up in Kirriemuir and was the Scotts' second child. A third child, another son, was born in 1949. Chick and Isa ran the family bakery in Kirriemuir's Bank Street. The family emigrated from Scotland to Australia in 1952.

The Scotts lived in the Melbourne suburb of Sunshine, Victoria, and Scott attended the nearby Sunshine Primary School. He received the nickname "Bon" shortly after starting school; because there was another Ronald in the class, his classmates played on the phrase "Bonnie Scotland". A fourth child, a son, was born in 1953.

In 1956, the family moved to Fremantle, Western Australia. Scott joined the associated Fremantle Scots Pipe Band, learning the drums. He attended North Fremantle Primary School and later John Curtin Senior High School until he dropped out at the age of 15. He subsequently worked as a farmhand and a crayfisherman, and was later a trainee weighing-machine mechanic. In 1963 he spent a short time in Fremantle Prison's assessment centre and nine months at the Riverbank Juvenile Institution, relating to charges of giving a false name and address to the police, having escaped legal custody, having unlawful carnal knowledge, and stealing 12 imperial gallons (55 L) of petrol. He attempted to join the Australian Army, but was rejected and deemed "socially maladjusted".

=== 1964–1970: The Spektors and the Valentines ===
Scott's vocals were inspired by his idol, Little Richard. After working as a postman, bartender and truck packer, Scott started his first band, the Spektors, in 1964 as drummer and occasional lead singer. In 1966, they merged with another local band, the Winstons, and formed the Valentines, in which Scott was co-lead singer with Vince Lovegrove. The Valentines recorded several songs written by George Young of the Easybeats. "Every Day I Have to Cry" (a song originally written and sung by Arthur Alexander) made the local record chart. In 1970, after gaining a place on the National Top 30 with their single "Juliette", The Valentines disbanded due to artistic differences after a much-publicised drug scandal.

=== 1970–1973: Fraternity and the Mount Lofty Rangers ===
Scott relocated to Adelaide in November 1970 after he joined the Sydney-formed progressive rock group Fraternity on lead vocals. They had local chart success with their version of Blackfeather's "Seasons of Change" (March 1971). Scott had previously played recorder on Blackfeather's version. Fraternity released the LPs Livestock and Flaming Galah before touring the UK in 1973, where they changed their name to Fang. During this time they played support slots for Status Quo and Geordie, whose front man Brian Johnson would eventually succeed Scott as the lead singer of AC/DC after his death. During this time, on 24 January 1972, Scott married Irene Thornton.

In 1973, just after returning to Australia from the tour of the UK, Fraternity went on hiatus. Scott took a day job at the Wallaroo fertiliser plant and began singing with the Mount Lofty Rangers, a loose collective of musicians helmed by Peter Head (né Beagley) from Headband, who explained, "Headband and Fraternity were in the same management stable and we both split about the same time so the logical thing was to take members from both bands and create a new one ... the purpose of the band was for songwriters to relate to each other and experiment with songs, so it was a hotbed of creativity". Other ex-Fraternity members also played with the band as did Glenn Shorrock pre Little River Band. During this time, Head also helped Scott with his original compositions.

Vince Lovegrove said, "Bon would go to Peter's home after a day of (literally) shovelling shit, and show him musical ideas he had had during his day's work. Bon's knowledge of the guitar was limited, so Peter began teaching him how to bridge chords and construct a song. One of the songs from these sessions was a ballad called 'Clarissa', about a local Adelaide girl. Another was the country-tinged 'Bin Up in the Hills Too Long', which for me was a sign of things to come with Bon's lyrics; simple, clever, sardonic, tongue-in-cheek ..."

In return, Scott recorded vocals for Mount Lofty Rangers songs "Round & Round" and "Carey Gully". Head released these original recordings in 1996, also teaming up with producer Ted Yanni, another old friend of Scott's, to create an entirely new backing for Round & Round & Round that more accurately reflected the original intentions Head had. Long out of print, and massively bootlegged, this EP finally got an official digital release in June 2010. Unrecorded original compositions of Scott's, "Been Up in the Hills Too Long" and "Clarissa" have been recorded by Head on his Peter Head & the Mount Lofty Rangers Lofty album, also released in digital format only in 2011.

About 11 pm on 3 May 1974, at the Old Lion Hotel in North Adelaide, during a rehearsal with the Mount Lofty Rangers, a very drunk, distressed and belligerent Scott had a raging argument with a member of the band. Scott stormed out of the venue, threw a bottle of Jack Daniel's to the ground, then sped off on his Suzuki GT550 motorbike. Scott suffered serious injuries from the ensuing motorcycle accident, spending three days in a coma and a further 18 days in hospital. During his recovery Vince Lovegrove and his wife gave Scott odd jobs, such as putting up posters and painting the office for their nascent booking/management agency. Shortly afterward, Lovegrove introduced him to AC/DC, who had been on the lookout for a new lead singer.

"There was a young, dinky little glam band from Sydney that we both loved called AC/DC ... Before another AC/DC visit, George Young phoned me and said the band was looking for a new singer. I immediately told him that the best guy for the job was Bon. George responded by saying Bon's accident would not allow him to perform, and that maybe he was too old (9 years older than Angus at the time). Nevertheless, I had a meeting with Malcolm and Angus, and suggested Bon as their new singer. They asked me to bring him out to the Pooraka Hotel that night, and to come backstage after the show. When he watched the band, Bon was impressed, and he immediately wanted to join them, but thought they may be a bit too inexperienced and too young. After the show, backstage, Bon expressed his doubts about them being "able to rock". The two Young brothers told Bon he was "too old to rock". The upshot was that they had a jam session that night in the home of Bon's former mentor, Bruce Howe, and at the end of the session, at dawn, it was obvious that AC/DC had found a new singer. And Bon had found a new band."

Fraternity later reformed and replaced Scott with Jimmy Barnes.

=== 1974–1980: AC/DC ===
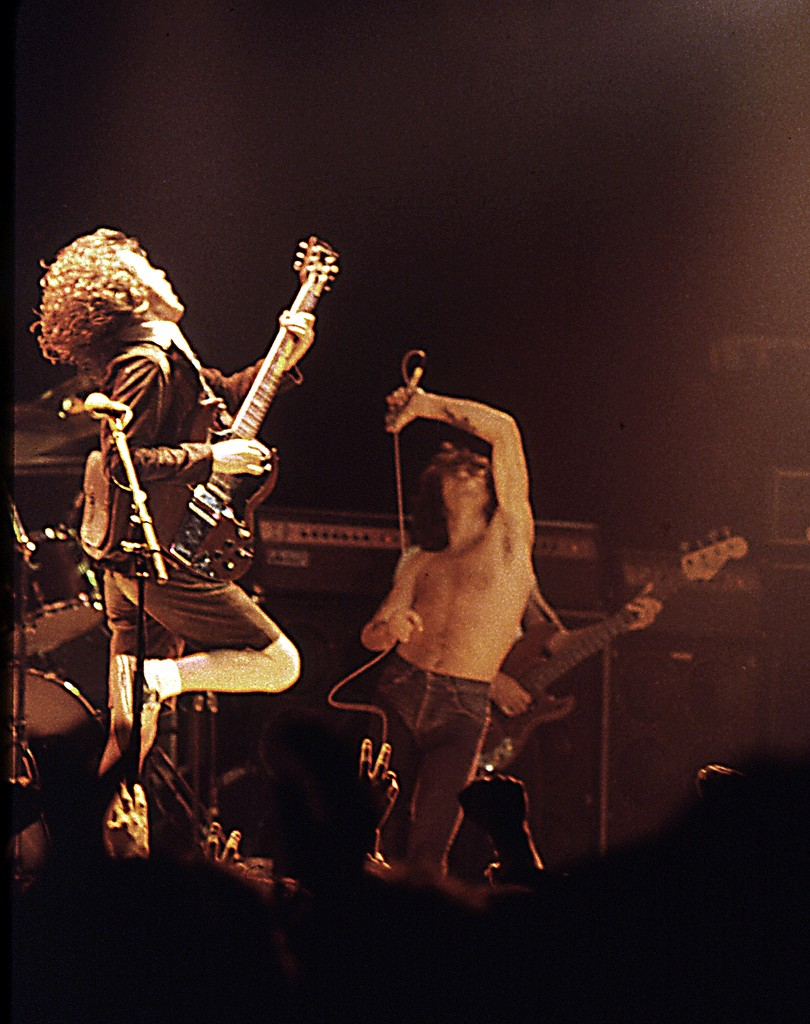
Bon Scott (centre), performing with AC/DC at the Ulster Hall in 1979

Scott's wife, Irene Thornton, later wrote, "The first time Bon saw AC/DC was in August 1974. They came through Adelaide with the Lou Reed and Stevie Wright tour, and played their own show at the Pooraka Hotel ... The first time I saw AC/DC was at the Pooraka Hotel in September. 'Get up there, Bon,' Vince kept saying. The band didn't have a singer that night; they were playing instrumental versions of old rock 'n' roll standards. The boys ripped through all these classic numbers and then finally, with enough pressure from Vince, Bon climbed onto the stage. I didn't realise that AC/DC had just sacked Dave Evans and they wanted Bon to replace him. Like Bon, the Youngs were Scottish, so there was an instant bond."

Scott replaced Dave Evans as the lead singer of AC/DC on 24 October 1974, when it became obvious the band and Evans were heading in different directions, with Evans having personal clashes with band members and management. Scott's appointment coincided with him working as a chauffeur for the band at the time until an audition promoted him to lead singer.

With the Young brothers as lead and rhythm guitarists, session drummer Tony Currenti (see AC/DC line-ups) and George Young as a temporary bassist, AC/DC released High Voltage, their first LP in Australia, in February 1975. Within a few months Currenti was replaced by Phil Rudd and Mark Evans was hired as a permanent bassist, and AC/DC began recording their second album T.N.T., which was released in Australia in December 1975. The first AC/DC album to gain international distribution however was a compilation of tracks from the first two albums, also titled High Voltage, which was released in May 1976. Another studio album, Dirty Deeds Done Dirt Cheap, was released in September of the same year, but only in Australia; the international version of the album was released in December with a different track listing. The album was not released in the US until March 1981.

In the following years, AC/DC gained further success with their albums Let There Be Rock and Powerage. The 1978 release of Powerage marked the debut of bassist Cliff Williams (who had replaced Mark Evans), and with its harder riffs, followed the blueprint set by Let There Be Rock. Only one single was released from Powerage—"Rock 'n' Roll Damnation"—which gave AC/DC their highest chart position at the time, reaching #24. An appearance at The Apollo, Glasgow, during the Powerage tour was recorded and released as If You Want Blood You've Got It.

The band's sixth album, Highway to Hell, was produced by Robert John "Mutt" Lange and was released in 1979. It became AC/DC's first LP to break the US top 100, eventually reaching #17, and it propelled AC/DC into the top ranks of hard-rock acts.

On 9 February 1980, AC/DC appeared on Aplauso TV (Spain) where they played "Beating Around the Bush", "Girls Got Rhythm", and "Highway to Hell"; this would be Bon Scott's last appearance with AC/DC before his death.

== Personal life ==
Scott met Irene Thornton, from Adelaide, in 1971 while he was the lead singer for Fraternity. They married in 1972. The couple separated after two years of marriage and divorced in 1977, but remained friends until Scott's death. After Thornton, Scott had a significant ongoing relationship with Margaret "Silver" Smith, whom he had met in Adelaide in the early 1970s. Scott and Smith broke up in 1977 but were in touch until his death.

Around 1977, Bon spent the evening with a large Tasmanian woman who impressed him with her longevity in the romance department, even though she wasn't very pretty. He used this encounter to write the song "Whole Lotta Rosie" on their Let There Be Rock album.

== Death ==
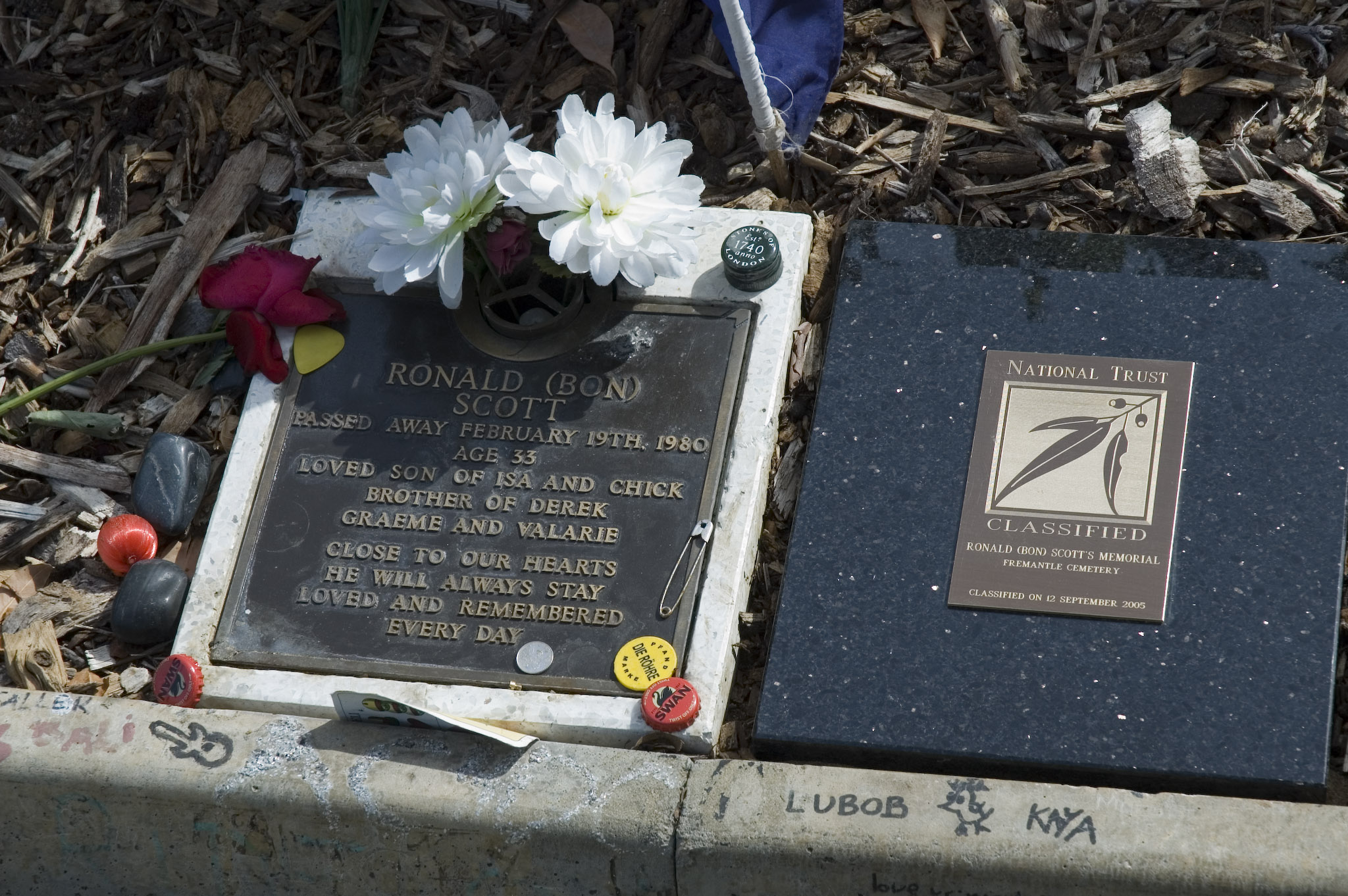
Bon Scott's grave

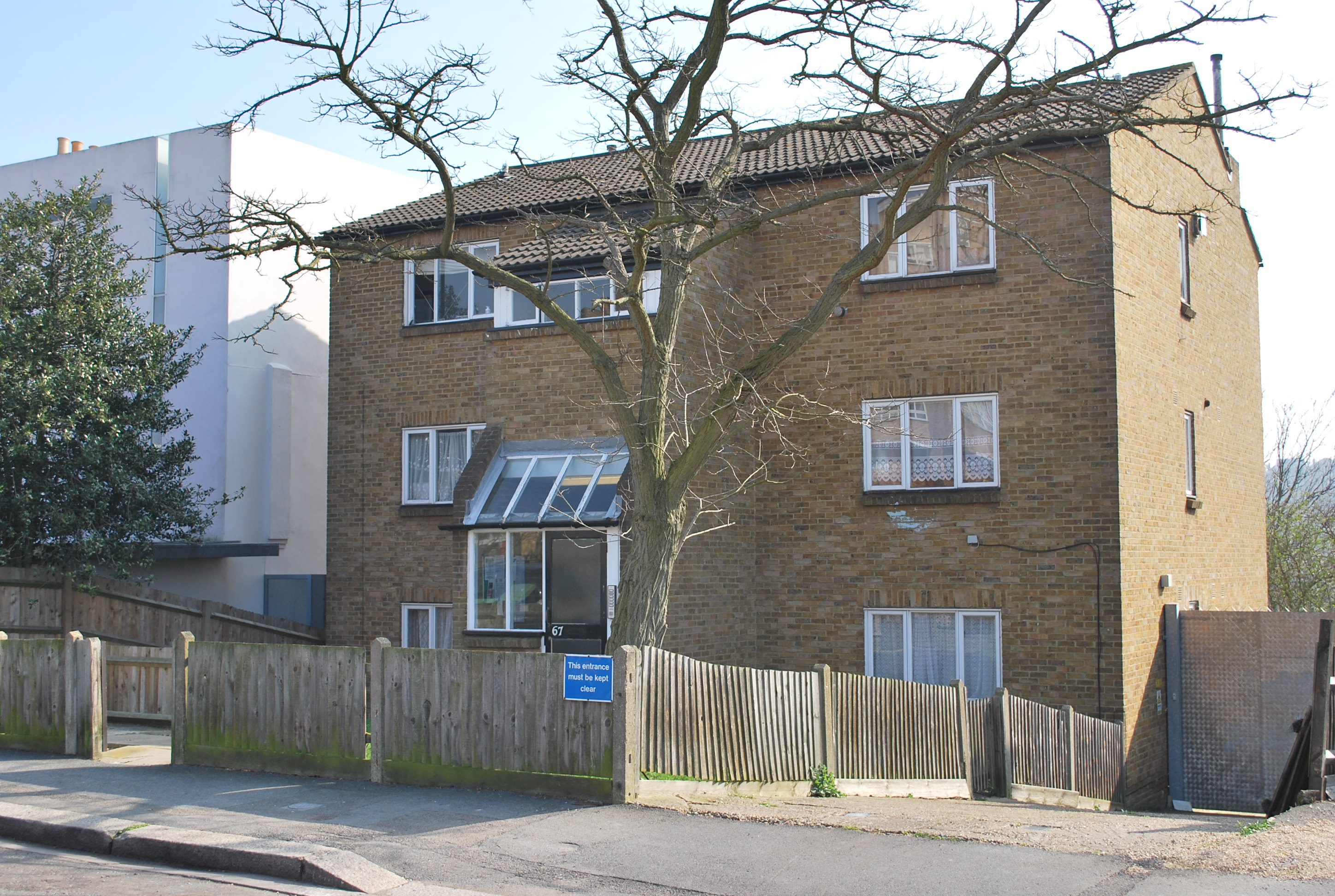
67 Overhill Road, East Dulwich, London, the site of Bon Scott's death

Sometime during the late evening of 18 February and early morning of Tuesday, 19 February 1980, Scott passed out and died at the age of 33. He had just visited a London club called The Music Machine. He was allegedly left to sleep in a Renault 5 owned by his friend Alistair Kinnear, at 67 Overhill Road in East Dulwich. Later that day, Kinnear found Scott unconscious and alerted the authorities. Scott was taken to King's College Hospital in Camberwell, where he was pronounced dead on arrival. The official report of the coroner concluded that Scott had died of "acute alcohol poisoning" and classified it as "death by misadventure".

Previously, on 15 February 1980, Scott attended a session where Malcolm and Angus Young were working on the beginnings of two songs that would later be recorded on the Back in Black album: "Have a Drink on Me" and "Let Me Put My Love into You", with Scott accompanying on drums rather than singing or writing lyrics. Young has also claimed Scott played drums on "Hells Bells" while AC/DC drummer Simon Wright has claimed Angus Young played him a demo of Scott playing drums on "Back in Black". Days earlier, Scott had gone with Mick Cocks to visit their friends the French group Trust in the Scorpio Sound studio in London, where they recorded the album Répression; Scott was working on the English adaptation of texts by Bernie Bonvoisin for the English version of the album. During this visit, the musicians did a jam session of "Ride On". This improvised session was Scott's last recording.

As part of the funeral arrangements, Scott's body was embalmed by Desmond Henley; it was later cremated, and Scott's ashes were interred by his family at Fremantle Cemetery in Fremantle. Shortly after Scott's death, the remaining members of AC/DC briefly considered disbanding. However, it was eventually decided that Scott would have wanted them to continue, and with the Scott family's encouragement, the band hired Brian Johnson as their new vocalist. Before his death, Scott had praised Johnson and the performer's group Geordie to his friends, comparing the other vocalist to Little Richard and remarking (according to Angus Young) along the lines that Scott had found "a guy that knows what rock and roll is all about". In Jesse Fink's 2017 book, Bon: The Last Highway, Fink explores the death of Scott and the surrounding circumstances, presenting alternate theories to the official account. Based on his research, he claims other factors might have played a role in Scott's death; alleging that heroin use could have been involved. He also contends that "the police investigation and the coroner’s inquest were substandard."

== Lyrics controversy ==
Five months after Scott's death, AC/DC finished the work they had begun with Scott; they released Back in Black as a tribute to him, but his name did not appear in the writing credits. The issue of whether Scott's lyrics were used, uncredited, on the album is an enduring topic of debate.

== Legacy ==
=== Landmarks ===
==== Australia ====
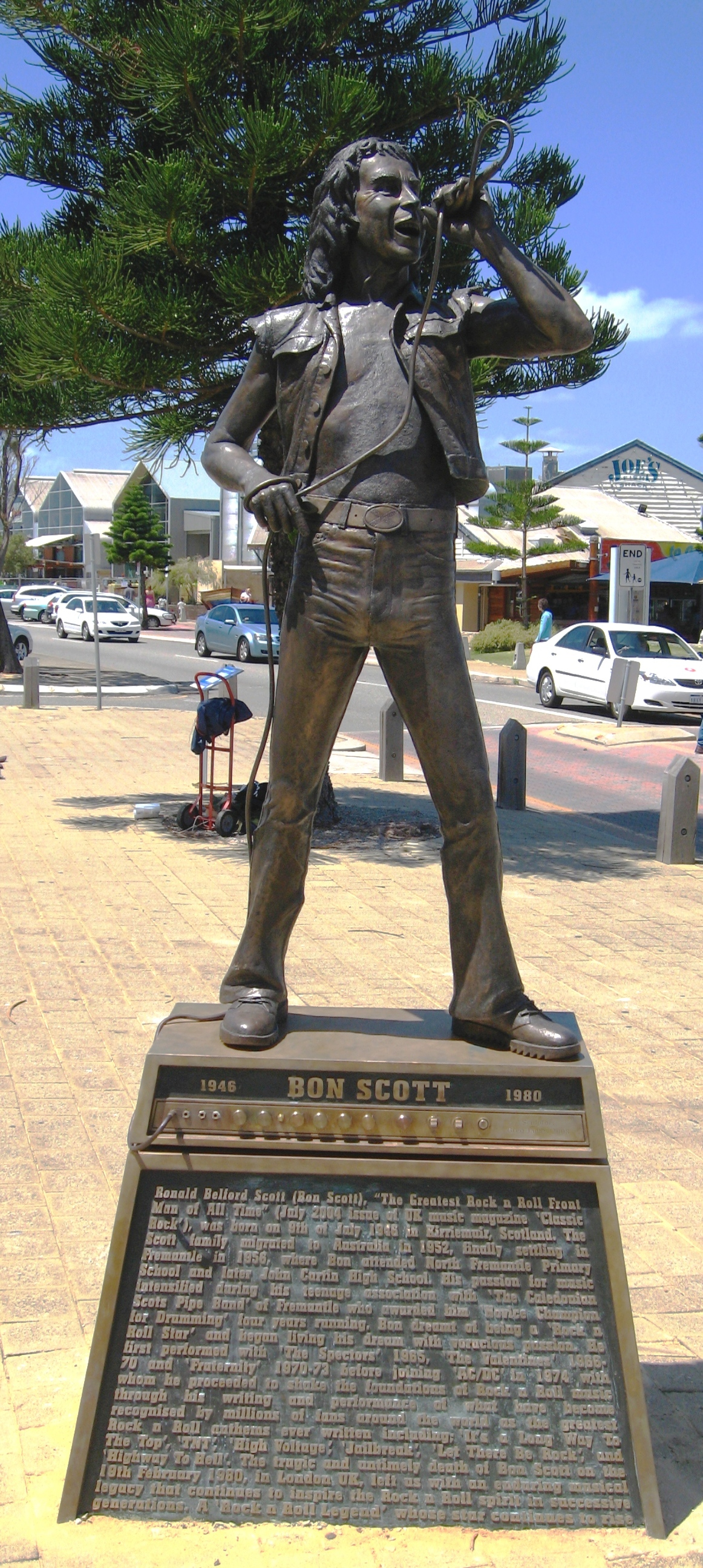
Statue of Bon Scott, Fremantle, Western Australia

Scott's grave site in Palmyra has become a cultural landmark. More than 28 years after his death, the National Trust of Australia declared his grave important enough to be included on the list of classified heritage places. It is reportedly the most visited grave in Australia. On 7 July 2006, to mark his 60th birthday, the Metropolitan Cemeteries Board completed refurbishments on the Bon Scott Grave Area. This consisted of a Bon Scott Arch and Memorial Entrance gate off Carrington Street in the north-west corner of Fremantle Cemetery. On 9 July 2006, sixty years to the day from Scott's birth, the bronze plaque was stolen from the site.

A bronze statue of Scott was unveiled at Fremantle Fishing Boat Harbour in Western Australia on 24 February 2008. The statue portrays Scott atop a Marshall amplifier.

ACDC Lane is a street in the Melbourne central business district. It was renamed on 1 October 2004 as a tribute to AC/DC. The trademark lightning bolt or slash ("/") used to separate the AC and the DC in the band's name contravened the naming policy of the Office of the Registrar of Geographic Names, so the punctuation was omitted on the street sign. Melbourne's Lord Mayor John So launched ACDC Lane with the words, "As the song says, there is a highway to hell, but this is a laneway to heaven. Let us rock". Bagpipers then played It's a Long Way to the Top (If You Wanna Rock 'n' Roll). Those were all songs from Bon Scott era. The lane contains a rock 'n' roll nightclub called the Cherry Bar.

==== Scotland ====
On 6 May 2006, the town of Kirriemuir in Scotland held a service and unveiled a Caithness stone slab commemorating the singer. A message was read from a long-time friend and fellow member of the Valentines, Vince Lovegrove, in which he said:

The thing I loved most about Bon Scott, was his almost unique self honesty. What you saw was what you got, he was a real person and as honest as the day is long. To my mind he was the street poet of my generations and of the generations that followed.

A life-sized bronze statue of Scott was unveiled by former AC/DC bass player Mark Evans in Bellies Brae Car Park in Kirriemuir on 30 April 2016, during the 10th anniversary of the Bonfest music festival. Kirriemuir hosts an annual festival known as "Bonfest" as a tribute to Bon Scott and AC/DC. It was originally held in July on the weekend closest to his birthday but moved to May because of other events in the local area during July. The statue was commissioned by local community group DD8 Music and created by John McKenna.

=== Posthumous releases ===
AC/DC released a box set entitled Bonfire as a tribute to Scott on 18 November 1997. It contains four albums; a remastered version of Back in Black; a "rarities" album with alternate takes, outtakes, and stray live cuts, Volts; and two live albums, Live from the Atlantic Studios and Let There Be Rock: The Movie. Live from the Atlantic Studios was recorded on 7 December 1977 at the Atlantic Studios in New York City. Let There Be Rock: The Movie is a double album which was recorded on 9 December 1979 at the Pavillon de Paris in Paris, and was the soundtrack of the motion picture, AC/DC: Let There Be Rock.

=== Accolades, awards and tributes ===
AC/DC's seventh studio album Back in Black was released as a dedication and tribute to Scott. In 2003, Scott was posthumously inducted into the Rock and Roll Hall of Fame as a member of AC/DC with his nephews present to accept the honour in his place.

In 2003, Scott's final studio album with AC/DC, 1979's Highway to Hell ranked 199 on Rolling Stone's "The 500 Greatest Albums of All Time". In 2004, the song "Highway to Hell" that Scott co-wrote with Malcolm and Angus Young ranked 254 on Rolling Stone's The 500 Greatest Songs of All Time.

In the July 2004 issue of UK magazine Classic Rock, Scott was rated as number one in a list of the "100 Greatest Frontmen", ahead of Freddie Mercury and Robert Plant.

The French rock band Trust wrote their hit song "Ton dernier acte" ("Your Last Act") in memory of Scott in 1980. German hard rock band Kingdom Come wrote and recorded a song titled "Bon Scott" for their album, Ain't Crying for the Moon, as a tribute to the former AC/DC frontman. Romanian hard rock group Iris recorded the song "Ultimul mic dejun al lui Bon" ("Bon's Last Breakfast") as a tribute to Scott, released on their 1997 album Lună plină.

Many artists perform live covers of songs that Scott wrote with AC/DC as a tribute to him. On 19 February 2005, the 25th anniversary of Scott's death, thrash metal band Megadeth performed a cover of "Problem Child" as a tribute. Singer and guitarist Dave Mustaine talked about how much Scott had influenced him. Hard rock band Guns N' Roses frequently perform "Whole Lotta Rosie" in concert and covered it in 1987. AC/DC performed their own song "Ride On" only one time in 2001 as a tribute to Scott.

=== Literature ===
Scott is the subject of several books including two biographies by Jesse Fink - Bon: The Last Highway (2017, updated in 2018 and 2022) and Bon: Notes from the Highway (2024) - and Clinton Walker's Highway to Hell (1994 and updated in 2015 and 2023). Fink's books claim that Scott died from a lethal combination of alcohol and heroin, while Walker backs the coroner's finding of alcohol poisoning. The controversial point that he and Walker both agree on is that many of Scott's lyrics were co-opted, uncredited, into Back in Black. Other books about Scott include Irene Thornton's memoir My Bon Scott (2014, retitled outside Australia as Have a Drink on Me), Mary Renshaw's Live Wire (2015) and Victor Marshall's Fraternity: Pub Rock Pioneers (2021).

=== Film ===
In 2024 it was reported a feature film called The Kid from Harvest Road was being made of Scott's time in Western Australia before he became a musician.

== Discography ==
=== With AC/DC ===
Studio albums

- High Voltage (1975) (Australasia only)
- T.N.T. (1975) (Australasia only)
- High Voltage (1976) (international version)
- Dirty Deeds Done Dirt Cheap (1976) (Australasia, UK, international except US)
- Let There Be Rock (1977)
- Powerage (1978)
- Highway to Hell (1979)
- Dirty Deeds Done Dirt Cheap (1981) (US only)

Live albums

- If You Want Blood You've Got It (1978)

=== With Fraternity ===
Studio albums

- Livestock (1971)
- Flaming Galah (1972)

== Awards ==
Year	Nominee / work	Award	Result
2005	Bon Scott	Hall of Fame	inductee
