= Mythology (Bee Gees album) =

Compilation album by the Bee Gees and Andy Gibb
- Released: November 2010
- Recorded: July 1966 – September 2001
- Genres: Rock; pop; disco; baroque pop
- Labels: Reprise, Warner Bros.
- Producers: Bee Gees; Albhy Galuten; Karl Richardson; Robert Stigwood; Arif Mardin; Russ Titelman; Ossie Byrne; Peter-John Vettese

The Bee Gees and Andy Gibb chronology
The Ultimate Bee Gees (2009)	Mythology (2010)	Timeless: The All-Time Greatest Hits (2017)

2012 edition
- 2012 Reissue cover

Professional ratings
Review scores
Source	Rating
AllMusic	4/5 stars

Mythology is a box set compilation of recordings by the Gibb brothers, mostly performed as the Bee Gees, arranged in a four disc set each highlighting a Gibb brother. Barry and Robin chose their own songs (presumably their personal favourites), with Maurice's songs selected by his widow Yvonne and Andy's songs selected by his daughter Peta. Several U.S. and U.K. hits are absent from this collection including "Lonely Days", "How Can You Mend a Broken Heart", "You Should Be Dancing", "Nights on Broadway", "World" and "One".

== Background ==
All of the songs on Barry's & Robin's disc have already been released on CD, though several are receiving new remasters by Rhino/Reprise, which is true for all the songs in this set. Maurice's disc includes two unreleased tracks from 1999, "Angel of Mercy" and "The Bridge", as well as his 1984 single "Hold Her in Your Hand", which makes its CD debut. Missing from Maurice's disc is his jazzy "My Thing" from 1970 and a rare B-side, "I've Come Back" from 1970, of which the latter has never been released on CD. Andy's disc contains his previously unreleased final song from 1987, "Arrow Through the Heart", which was briefly heard on Behind the Music: Andy Gibb.

Originally scheduled to be released on 3 November 2009, it was subsequently pushed back to March 2010, but was removed from Rhino's release schedule as that date approached. The set was eventually released on 15 November 2010. During Barry & Robin's appearance on Late Night with Jimmy Fallon in March, the set was shown complete with liner notes and pictures.

Barry says in liner notes, "They say the future is always brighter if you can let go of the past, but the Bee Gees will live forever in my heart. These are pretty much our personal favorites. When I look back now, it is more about the journey, not the arrival". Robin adds in liner notes, "This is now the Bee Gees 50th anniversary. And by the Bee Gees, I mean all four brothers". Robin adds: "I always see our songs as 'just us brothers' having a good time. When I look back now, it is more about the journey, not the arrival".

Mythology also features a collection of family photos, many never-before published, along with tributes from artists such as George Martin, Brian Wilson, Elton John, Graham Nash, and the band's long-time manager Robert Stigwood.

== Track listing ==
=== Disc 1 – Barry ===
No.	Title	Writer(s)	Place of Origin	Length
1.	"Spirits (Having Flown)" (with counting before the intro)	Barry Gibb, Robin Gibb, Maurice Gibb	Spirits Having Flown, 1979	5:21
2.	"You Win Again"	B. Gibb, R. Gibb, M. Gibb	E.S.P., 1987	4:01
3.	"Jive Talkin'"	B. Gibb, R. Gibb, M. Gibb	Main Course, 1975	3:44
4.	"To Love Somebody" (stereo)	B. Gibb, R. Gibb	Bee Gees' 1st, 1967	3:02
5.	"Tragedy"	B. Gibb, R. Gibb, M. Gibb	Spirits Having Flown	5:03
6.	"Too Much Heaven"	B. Gibb, R. Gibb, M. Gibb	Spirits Having Flown	4:58
7.	"First of May" (stereo)	B. Gibb, R. Gibb, M. Gibb	Odessa, 1969	2:49
8.	"More Than a Woman"	B. Gibb, R. Gibb, M. Gibb	Saturday Night Fever: The Original Movie Sound Track, 1977	3:15
9.	"Love So Right"	B. Gibb, R. Gibb, M. Gibb	Children of the World, 1976	3:34
10.	"Night Fever"	B. Gibb, R. Gibb, M. Gibb	Saturday Night Fever: The Original Movie Sound Track	3:31
11.	"Words" (mono mix)	B. Gibb, R. Gibb, M. Gibb	Non-album single, 1968	3:13
12.	"Don't Forget to Remember"	B. Gibb, M. Gibb	Cucumber Castle, 1970	3:28
13.	"If I Can't Have You"	B. Gibb, R. Gibb, M. Gibb	B-side to the "Stayin' Alive" single, 1977	3:25
14.	"Alone"	B. Gibb, R. Gibb, M. Gibb	Still Waters, 1997	4:49
15.	"Heartbreaker"	B. Gibb, R. Gibb, M. Gibb	Their Greatest Hits: The Record, 2001	4:10
16.	"How Deep Is Your Love"	B. Gibb, R. Gibb, M. Gibb	Saturday Night Fever: The Original Movie Sound Track	4:06
17.	"Love You Inside Out"	B. Gibb, R. Gibb, M. Gibb	Spirits Having Flown	4:12
18.	"Stayin' Alive"	B. Gibb, R. Gibb, M. Gibb	Saturday Night Fever: The Original Movie Sound Track	4:45
19.	"Barker of the UFO" (mono mix previously unreleased on CD)	B. Gibb	B-side to the "Massachusetts" UK single, 1967	1:48
20.	"Swan Song"	B. Gibb, R. Gibb, M. Gibb	Idea, 1968	2:55
21.	"Spicks and Specks"	B. Gibb	Spicks and Specks, 1966	2:52
Total length:				79:01

=== Disc 2 – Robin ===
No.	Title	Writer(s)	Place of Origin	Length
1.	"I Am the World"	R. Gibb	B-side to the "Spicks and Specks" single, 1966	2:35
2.	"New York Mining Disaster 1941" (stereo)	B. Gibb, R. Gibb	Bee Gees' 1st	2:09
3.	"I Can't See Nobody" (stereo)	B. Gibb, R. Gibb	Bee Gees' 1st	3:45
4.	"Holiday" (stereo)	B. Gibb, R. Gibb	Bee Gees' 1st	2:52
5.	"Massachusetts" (stereo)	B. Gibb, R. Gibb, M. Gibb	Horizontal	2:22
6.	"Sir Geoffrey Saved the World" (mono mix previously unreleased on CD)	B. Gibb, R. Gibb, M. Gibb	B-side to the "Massachusetts" (in the US) and "World" singles, 1967	2:14
7.	"And the Sun Will Shine" (stereo)	B. Gibb, R. Gibb, M. Gibb	Horizontal	3:26
8.	"The Singer Sang His Song" (mono mix previously unreleased on CD)	B. Gibb, R. Gibb, M. Gibb	Non-album double A-side single, 1968	3:07
9.	"I've Gotta Get a Message to You" (mono single mix)	B. Gibb, R. Gibb, M. Gibb	A-side single, 1968	2:59
10.	"I Started a Joke" (stereo)	B. Gibb, R. Gibb, M. Gibb	Idea	3:05
11.	"Odessa (City on the Black Sea)" (stereo)	B. Gibb, R. Gibb, M. Gibb	Odessa	7:33
12.	"Saved by the Bell" (stereo / Solo track)	R. Gibb	Robin's Reign, 1970	3:20
13.	"My World"	B. Gibb, R. Gibb	Non-album single, 1972	4:20
14.	"Run to Me"	B. Gibb, R. Gibb, M. Gibb	To Whom It May Concern, 1972	3:11
15.	"Love Me"	B. Gibb, R. Gibb	Children of the World	4:01
16.	"Juliet" (Solo track)	R. Gibb, M. Gibb	How Old Are You?, 1983	3:46
17.	"The Longest Night" (full version)	B. Gibb, R. Gibb, M. Gibb	E.S.P.	5:46
18.	"Fallen Angel"	B. Gibb, R. Gibb, M. Gibb	Size Isn't Everything, 1993	4:30
19.	"Rings Around the Moon"	B. Gibb, R. Gibb, M. Gibb	Still Waters bonus track, B-side to "Alone"	4:30
20.	"Embrace"	R. Gibb	This Is Where I Came In, 2001	4:43
21.	"Islands in the Stream"	B. Gibb, R. Gibb, M. Gibb, Praskazrel Michel (Additional lyrics borrowed from Pras Michel's "Ghetto Supastar (That Is What You Are)" credited for the 2001 Bee Gees recording)	Their Greatest Hits: The Record	4:15
Total length:				78:29

=== Disc 3 – Maurice ===
No.	Title	Writer(s)	Place of Origin	Length
1.	"Man in the Middle"	M. Gibb, B. Gibb	This Is Where I Came In	4:21
2.	"Closer Than Close"	B. Gibb, R. Gibb, M. Gibb	Still Waters	4:34
3.	"Dimensions"	B. Gibb, R. Gibb, M. Gibb	High Civilization, 1991	5:25
4.	"House of Shame"	B. Gibb, R. Gibb, M. Gibb	One, 1989	4:51
5.	"Suddenly" (stereo)	B. Gibb, R. Gibb, M. Gibb	Odessa	2:29
6.	"Railroad" (Solo track)	M. Gibb, William Lawrie	Non-album single, 1970	3:37
7.	"Overnight"	B. Gibb, R. Gibb, M. Gibb	E.S.P.	4:20
8.	"It's Just the Way"	M. Gibb	Trafalgar, 1971	2:34
9.	"Lay It on Me"	M. Gibb	2 Years On, 1970	2:07
10.	"Trafalgar"	M. Gibb	Trafalgar	3:53
11.	"Omega Man"	B. Gibb, R. Gibb, M. Gibb	Size Isn't Everything	3:59
12.	"Walking on Air"	M. Gibb	This Is Where I Came In	4:05
13.	"Country Woman"	M. Gibb	B-side to the "How Can You Mend a Broken Heart" single, 1971	2:48
14.	"Angel of Mercy" (Duet with Samantha Gibb)	B. Gibb, R. Gibb, M. Gibb	Previously unreleased, 2010	4:59
15.	"Above and Beyond"	B. Gibb, R. Gibb, M. Gibb	Size Isn't Everything	4:27
16.	"Hold Her in Your Hand" (Solo track)	B. Gibb, M. Gibb	Non-album single, 1984	4:23
17.	"You Know It's for You"	M. Gibb	To Whom It May Concern	2:56
18.	"Wildflower"	B. Gibb, R. Gibb, M. Gibb	Living Eyes, 1981	4:23
19.	"On Time"	M. Gibb	B-side to the "My World" single	3:00
20.	"The Bridge" (Trio with Adam and Samantha Gibb)	M. Gibb, Adam Gibb, Samantha Gibb	Previously unreleased	4:29
Total length:				77:40

=== Disc 4 – Andy ===
No.	Title	Writer(s)	Place of Origin	Length
1.	"Shadow Dancing"	B. Gibb, R. Gibb, M. Gibb, A. Gibb	Shadow Dancing, 1978	4:34
2.	"I Just Want to Be Your Everything"	B. Gibb	Flowing Rivers, 1977	3:48
3.	"(Love Is) Thicker Than Water"	B. Gibb, A. Gibb	Flowing Rivers	4:15
4.	"An Everlasting Love"	B. Gibb	Shadow Dancing	4:06
5.	"Desire"	B. Gibb, R. Gibb, M. Gibb	After Dark, 1980	4:24
6.	"(Our Love) Don't Throw it All Away"	B. Gibb, Blue Weaver	Shadow Dancing	4:07
7.	"Flowing Rivers"	A. Gibb	Flowing Rivers	3:37
8.	"Words and Music" (album version)	A. Gibb	Flowing Rivers	4:42
9.	"I Can't Help It" (Duet with Olivia Newton-John)	B. Gibb	After Dark	4:07
10.	"Time Is Time" (full ending)	A. Gibb, B. Gibb	A-side single, 1980	4:02
11.	"Me (Without You)"	A. Gibb	Andy Gibb's Greatest Hits, 1980	3:41
12.	"After Dark"	B. Gibb	After Dark	4:17
13.	"Warm Ride"	B. Gibb, R. Gibb, M. Gibb	After Dark	3:30
14.	"Too Many Looks in Your Eyes"	A. Gibb	Flowing Rivers	4:10
15.	"Man on Fire" (Demo)	B. Gibb, A. Gibb, M. Gibb	Andy Gibb, 1991	5:24
16.	"Arrow Through the Heart" (Demo)	B. Gibb, A. Gibb, M. Gibb	Previously unreleased	3:43
17.	"Starlight"	A. Gibb	Flowing Rivers	3:32
18.	"Dance to the Light of the Morning"	A. Gibb	Flowing Rivers	3:19
19.	"In the End"	A. Gibb	Flowing Rivers	3:16
Total length:				75:51

== Charts ==
=== Weekly charts ===
Chart (2011–13)	Peak position
Australian Albums (ARIA)	3
Austrian Albums (Ö3 Austria)	33
Dutch Albums (Album Top 100)	100
German Albums (Offizielle Top 100)	9
Irish Albums (IRMA)	60
New Zealand Albums (RMNZ)	9
Scottish Albums (Official Charts)	37
Swiss Albums (Schweizer Hitparade)	31
UK Albums (Official Charts)	29

=== Year-end charts ===
Chart (2012)	Position
Australian Albums (ARIA)	23
UK Albums (OCC)	141

Chart (2013)	Position
Australian Albums (ARIA)	30

=== Decade-end charts ===
Chart (2010–2019)	Position
Australian Albums (ARIA)	70

== Certifications ==
Region	Certification	Certified units/sales
Australia (ARIA)	2× Platinum	140,000^{^}
New Zealand (RMNZ)	Gold	7,500^{^}
United Kingdom (BPI)	Gold	100,000^{^}
^{^} Shipments figures based on certification alone.
