= Andy Gibb (album) =

Greatest hits album by Andy Gibb
- Released: November 19, 1991
- Label: Polydor
- Producer: Barry Gibb; Maurice Gibb; Albhy Galuten; Karl Richardson

Andy Gibb chronology
Andy Gibb's Greatest Hits (1980)	Andy Gibb (1991)	20th Century Masters – The Millennium Collection (2001)

Andy Gibb (sometimes known as Greatest Hits) is a posthumous greatest hits album by English singer and musician Andy Gibb, released in 1991 by Polydor Records. Containing most of his single releases, the compilation was the first release of Gibb's music following his death in 1988, and also includes "Man on Fire", a new track recorded during his last recording sessions.

== Background ==
Gibb's recording career had been on hold following his success in the late 1970s to the beginning of the 1980s, which included three number one singles on the US Billboard Hot 100. In 1987, the year before Gibb's death in March 1988, he had returned to the recording studio and recorded four new songs, including "Man on Fire", co-written with his brothers Barry and Maurice Gibb from the band the Bee Gees. A full album was planned but never materialised.

== Content ==
This greatest hits album includes "Man on Fire" from Gibb's final 1987 recording sessions as the opening track, followed by singles and album tracks from his three studio albums Flowing Rivers (1977), Shadow Dancing (1978) and After Dark (1980), plus two tracks that had been released on the compilation Andy Gibb's Greatest Hits (1980).

== Critical reception ==
Professional ratings
Review scores
Source	Rating
AllMusic	4.5/5 stars

In a review for AllMusic, Stephen Thomas Erlewine wrote that the compilation "is an excellent summation of Gibb's brief career, and for most fans, it will be the only Gibb album they'll need."

== Track listing ==
No.	Title	Writer(s)	Origin	Length
1.	"Man on Fire"	Andy Gibb; Barry Gibb; Maurice Gibb	new track	5:21
2.	"I Just Want to Be Your Everything"	B. Gibb	Flowing Rivers	3:47
3.	"(Love Is) Thicker Than Water"	A. Gibb; B. Gibb	Flowing Rivers	4:15
4.	"Flowing Rivers"	A. Gibb	Flowing Rivers	3:39
5.	"Shadow Dancing"	A. Gibb; B. Gibb; M. Gibb; Robin Gibb	Shadow Dancing	4:33
6.	"An Everlasting Love"	B. Gibb	Shadow Dancing	4:08
7.	"(Our Love) Don't Throw It All Away"	B. Gibb; Blue Weaver	Shadow Dancing	4:07
8.	"Desire"	B. Gibb; M. Gibb; R. Gibb	After Dark	4:29
9.	"After Dark"	B. Gibb	After Dark	4:21
10.	"I Can't Help It" (with Olivia Newton-John)	B. Gibb	After Dark	4:08
11.	"Time Is Time"	A. Gibb; B. Gibb	Andy Gibb's Greatest Hits	3:43
12.	"Me (Without You)"	A. Gibb	Andy Gibb's Greatest Hits	3:41

== Personnel ==
Adapted from the album's liner notes.

Track 1: "Man on Fire"

- Andy Gibb – vocals, backing vocals
- Barry Gibb – backing vocals, rhythm guitar, drum programming, producer
- Maurice Gibb – backing vocals, keyboards, drum programming, producer
- Scott Glasel – programming, engineer

Tracks 2–12

- Andy Gibb – vocals
- Barry Gibb – guitar, synthesizer, backing vocals, strings arranger
- Maurice Gibb – backing vocals
- Robin Gibb – backing vocals
- Bob Basso – strings contractor
- George Bitzer – keyboards
- Gary Brown – saxophone
- Dennis Byron – drums
- Charlie Chalmers – backing vocals
- Harold Cowart – bass guitar
- Cornell Dupree – guitar
- Russ Freeland – trombone
- Steve Gadd – drums
- Albhy Galuten – piano, synthesizer, strings arranger, conductor
- Paul Harris – piano
- Alan Kendall – guitar
- Joe Lala – percussion
- Joey Murcia – guitar
- Brett Murphy – trumpet
- Gene Orloff – strings contractor
- Jerry Peel – French horn
- Tim Renwick – guitar
- Sandy & Donna Rhodes – backing vocals
- Tom Roady – percussion
- Johnne Sambataro – backing vocals
- Sid Sharp – strings contractor
- Richard Tee – electric piano
- George Terry – guitar
- Joe Walsh – guitar
- Blue Weaver – keyboards
- Daniel Ben Zebulon – percussion
- Ron Ziegler – drums
- Peter Graves, Ken Faulk, Whit Sidener, Bill Purse, Neil Bonsanti, Stan Webb – Boneroo horns

Technical

- Gibb-Galuten-Richardson (Barry Gibb, Albhy Galuten, Karl Richardson) – production team
- Barry Gibb – mastering
- Maurice Gibb – mastering
- Scott Glasel – mastering
- Karl Richardson – engineer
- Dennis Hertzendorfer – assistant engineer
- Don Gehman – assistant engineer
- John Blanche – assistant engineer
- Steve Gersky – assistant engineer
- Mike Fuller – mastering
- Recorded at Criteria & Middle Ear (Miami, Florida)
- Bill Levenson – album compiler
- Jennifer Kirby – front cover drawing
- Wendi Cohen – layout design
