= Andy Gibb's Greatest Hits =

Greatest hits album by Andy Gibb
- Released: September 1980
- Recorded: 1976–1980
- Genres: Disco, funk, R&B, soul, soft rock, pop rock
- Length: 41:50
- Label: RSO
- Producer: Gibb-Galuten-Richardson

Andy Gibb compilations chronology
After Dark (1980)	Andy Gibb's Greatest Hits (1980)	Andy Gibb (1991)

Singles from Andy Gibb's Greatest Hits
- 1. "Time Is Time" Released: November 1980; 2. "Me (Without You)" Released: February 1981

Professional ratings
Review scores
Source	Rating
AllMusic	4/5 stars

Andy Gibb's Greatest Hits is the first compilation album by Andy Gibb. It was released in 1980. Aside from the previous singles it also contains three new songs being "Time Is Time", "Me (Without You)" and "Will You Love Me Tomorrow", the latter sung together with P. P. Arnold.

== Album content ==
The three new songs: "Time Is Time", "Me (Without You)" and "Will You Love Me Tomorrow" were recorded in the middle of 1980 at Criteria Studios. Another song, a cover of Bee Gees' "Morning of My Life" was recorded but was not included. On the album's side one, it features his five US Top 10 singles, while side two features three new songs and two songs from After Dark.

Record World said that "With a teardrop in his voice and cathedral keyboards rising throughout, Gibb sings of heartache" in the single "Me (Without You)."

The CD versions of the songs later appeared on the 1991 compilation Andy Gibb, except "Will You Love Me Tomorrow" which appeared on The Millennium Collection.

== Track listing ==
Side one
No.	Title	Writer(s)	Length
1.	"I Just Want to Be Your Everything" (from Flowing Rivers, 1977)	Barry Gibb	3:45
2.	"(Love Is) Thicker Than Water" (from Flowing Rivers, 1977)	B. Gibb; Andy Gibb	4:11
3.	"Shadow Dancing" (from Shadow Dancing, 1978)	B. Gibb; A. Gibb; Robin Gibb; Maurice Gibb	4:34
4.	"An Everlasting Love" (from Shadow Dancing, 1978)	B. Gibb	4:06
5.	"(Our Love) Don't Throw it All Away" (from Shadow Dancing, 1978)	B. Gibb; Blue Weaver	4:07

Side two
No.	Title	Writer(s)	Length
1.	"Time Is Time"	A. Gibb; B. Gibb	4:03
2.	"Me (Without You)"	A. Gibb	3:43
3.	"Will You Love Me Tomorrow" (duet with P.P. Arnold)	Gerry Goffin; Carole King	4:40
4.	"After Dark" (from After Dark, 1980)	B. Gibb	4:21
5.	"Desire" (from After Dark, 1980)	B. Gibb; R. Gibb; M. Gibb	4:24
Total length:			41:50

== Personnel ==
- Andy Gibb — lead vocals
- Barry Gibb — harmony and background vocals, acoustic guitar
- Joey Murcia — electric guitar
- Tim Renwick — electric guitar
- Paul Harris — piano, keyboards (tracks 1–2, 5)
- Albhy Galuten — synthesizer, orchestral arrangement
- Harold Cowart — bass
- Ron Ziegler — drums
- John Sambataro — background vocals (tracks 1–5)
- George Terry — electric guitar (tracks 1–2)
- Joe Walsh — electric guitar (tracks 1–2)
- Hugh McCracken — electric guitar (tracks 9–10)
- Don Buzzard — electric guitar (tracks 1–2)
- Nelson Pedron — percussion (tracks 1–2)
- Peter Graves — horn
- Whit Sidener — horn
- Kenny Faulk — horn
- Bill Purse — horn
- Neil Bonsanti — horn
- Dan Bonsanti — horn
- George Bitzer — keyboards
- Pat Arnold — lead vocals (track 8)
- Michael Brecker — saxophone (track 9)
- Randy Brecker — trumpet (track 9)
- Tom Roadie — percussion (tracks 9–10)
- Bernard Loop — drums (tracks 9–10)
- Charlie Chalmers — background vocals (tracks 9–10)
- Sandy Rhodes — background vocals (tracks 9–10)
- Donna Rhodes — background vocals (tracks 9–10)
- Cornell Dupree — electric guitar (tracks 6–8)
- Daniel Ben Zebulon — percussion (tracks 6–8)
- Steve Gadd — drums (tracks 6–8)
- Gene Orloff — concertmaster

Production

- Karl Richardson — sound engineer
- Steve Gersky — sound engineer (tracks 1–2)

== Charts ==
=== Weekly charts ===
Chart (1981)	Peak position
US Billboard 200	46
