= Why (Andy Gibb song) =

Single by Andy Gibb

from the album Shadow Dancing
- B-side: "One More Look at the Night" (US); "Fool for a Night" (UK)
- Released: September 1978; October 1978 (US)
- Recorded: December 1977 – January 1978; Wally Heider Studios, Los Angeles
- Genre: Disco
- Length: 4:31
- Label: RSO
- Songwriter(s): Barry Gibb, Andy Gibb
- Producer(s): Gibb-Galuten-Richardson

Andy Gibb singles chronology
"(Our Love) Don't Throw it All Away" (1978)	"Why" (1978)	"Desire" (1980)

"Why" is a song written by Barry Gibb and composed by Andy Gibb, fourth and last single released on the album Shadow Dancing. Released as a single in September 1978 by RSO Records around the same time as "(Our Love) Don't Throw It All Away". It was his only single that was not charted in any countries. The song was produced by Gibb-Galuten-Richardson.

== Writing and recording ==
Barry wrote the lyrics for this song while Andy composed the melody. As Andy reveals:

I wrote all the melody and I took it to Barry, pretty devastated with it saying, 'I just can't put lyrics to this song, I've tried'. I had tried, I tried for over a month on this song, and I was just on the verge of throwing it over my shoulder and going for another one. Barry put lyrics to it, and it's now turned out as his favorite song on the album.

It was recorded in Wally Heider Studios in Los Angeles, California. Barry sings background vocals on this track especially on the refrain and chorus. Barry also used his falsetto voice on this track as well as "Shadow Dancing", "Don't Throw it All Away" and "An Everlasting Love". The song features a guitar work by Jock Bartley of Firefall. John Sambataro, who later worked with Steve Winwood who also sing background vocals on the album, plays slide guitar on this track as it was featured on the intro and interlude.

== Release ==
The two US singles have consecutive catalog numbers and the same B side, as if "Why" was a quick replacement for "(Our Love) Don't Throw it All Away". (The song was in fact the American hit.) This track was produced by Barry, Albhy Galuten and Karl Richardson, but the B-side was "One More Look at the Night" written by Andy Gibb and produced only by Galuten and Richardson (and was also used as the B-side of "Don't Throw it All Away") In the UK, its B-side was "Fool for a Night" was originally released on Andy's 1977 debut album Flowing Rivers.

== Personnel ==
- Andy Gibb — lead vocals
- Barry Gibb — backing vocals
- John Sambataro — backing vocals, slide guitar
- Joey Murcia — guitar
- Jock Bartley — guitar
- George Bitzer — synthesizer
- Harold Cowart — bass
- Ron Ziegler — drums
- Joe Lala — percussion
