= List of Billboard Hot 100 top-ten singles in 1978 =

This is a list of singles that have peaked in the Top 10 of the Billboard Hot 100 during 1978.

Bee Gees and Andy Gibb each had four top-ten hits in 1978, tying them for the most top-ten hits during the year.

== Top-ten singles ==
- (#) – 1978 Year-end top 10 single position and rank

List of Billboard Hot 100 top ten singles which peaked in 1978
Top ten entry date	Single	Artist(s)	Peak	Peak date	Weeks in top ten
Singles from 1977
December 17	"Baby Come Back" (#7)	Player	1	January 14	10
December 17	"Here You Come Again"	Dolly Parton	3	January 14	6
December 24	"Slip Slidin' Away"	Paul Simon	5	January 28	6
December 24	"Sentimental Lady"	Bob Welch	8	January 7	4
Singles from 1978
January 7	"You're in My Heart (The Final Acclaim)"	Rod Stewart	4	January 14	5
January 7	"Hey Deanie"	Shaun Cassidy	7	January 14	3
January 14	"We Are the Champions"	Queen	4	February 4	7
January 14	"Come Sail Away"	Styx	8	January 28	3
January 21	"Stayin' Alive" (#4)	Bee Gees	1	February 4	13
January 21	"Short People"	Randy Newman	2	January 28	5
January 28	"(Love Is) Thicker Than Water" (#8)	Andy Gibb	1	March 4	11
January 28	"Just the Way You Are"	Billy Joel	3	February 18	8
February 4	"Sometimes When We Touch"	Dan Hill	3	March 4	8
February 4	"Emotion"	Samantha Sang	3	March 18	10
February 11	"Dance, Dance, Dance (Yowsah, Yowsah, Yowsah)"	Chic	6	February 25	6
February 25	"Night Fever" (#2)	Bee Gees	1	March 18	13
February 25	"Lay Down Sally"	Eric Clapton	3	April 1	11
March 4	"I Go Crazy"	Paul Davis	7	March 18	5
March 11	"Can't Smile Without You"	Barry Manilow	3	April 22	10
March 25	"If I Can't Have You"	Yvonne Elliman	1	May 13	10
March 25	"Thunder Island"	Jay Ferguson	9	April 1	3
April 1	"Dust in the Wind"	Kansas	6	April 15	7
April 8	"Jack and Jill"	Raydio	8	April 15	4
April 15	"The Closer I Get to You"	Roberta Flack and Donny Hathaway	2	May 13	8
April 15	"We'll Never Have to Say Goodbye Again"	England Dan & John Ford Coley	9	April 15	2
April 15	"Our Love"	Natalie Cole	10	April 15	2
April 22	"With a Little Luck"	Wings	1	May 20	8
April 29	"Too Much, Too Little, Too Late"	Johnny Mathis and Deniece Williams	1	June 3	8
April 29	"You're the One That I Want"	John Travolta and Olivia Newton-John	1	June 10	9
May 6	"Count On Me"	Jefferson Starship	8	May 13	4
May 13	"Imaginary Lover"	Atlanta Rhythm Section	7	June 3	4
May 20	"Shadow Dancing" (#1)	Andy Gibb	1	June 17	12
May 20	"Feels So Good"	Chuck Mangione	4	June 10	5
May 27	"On Broadway"	George Benson	7	June 10	4
June 3	"Take a Chance on Me"	ABBA	3	July 8	8
June 3	"This Time I'm in It for Love"	Player	10	June 3	2
June 10	"Baker Street"	Gerry Rafferty	2	June 24	9
June 10	"It's a Heartache"	Bonnie Tyler	3	June 24	6
June 17	"You Belong to Me"	Carly Simon	6	June 24	4
June 17	"Love Is Like Oxygen"	Sweet	8	June 24	3
June 24	"Use ta Be My Girl"	The O'Jays	4	July 8	7
June 24	"Still the Same"	Bob Seger & The Silver Bullet Band	4	July 22	7
June 24	"Dance With Me"	Peter Brown	8	July 8	4
July 1	"The Groove Line"	Heatwave	7	July 15	5
July 8	"Miss You"	The Rolling Stones	1	August 5	9
July 15	"Last Dance"	Donna Summer	3	August 12	7
July 22	"Three Times a Lady" (#10)	Commodores	1	August 12	11
July 22	"Grease"	Frankie Valli	1	August 26	8
July 29	"Love Will Find a Way"	Pablo Cruise	6	August 26	5
August 5	"Hot Blooded"	Foreigner	3	September 9	8
August 12	"Boogie Oogie Oogie" (#9)	A Taste of Honey	1	September 9	12
August 12	"An Everlasting Love"	Andy Gibb	5	September 23	8
August 12	"Copacabana (At the Copa)"	Barry Manilow	8	August 12	2
August 12	"Magnet and Steel"	Walter Egan	8	August 26	4
August 26	"Hopelessly Devoted to You"	Olivia Newton-John	3	September 23	8
September 2	"Kiss You All Over" (#5)	Exile	1	September 30	12
September 2	"Shame"	Evelyn "Champagne" King	9	September 9	3
September 9	"Summer Nights"	John Travolta and Olivia Newton-John	5	September 30	7
September 9	"Got to Get You into My Life"	Earth, Wind & Fire	9	September 16	2
September 16	"Don't Look Back"	Boston	4	October 7	6
September 23	"Hot Child in the City"	Nick Gilder	1	October 28	9
September 23	"Reminiscing"	Little River Band	3	October 28	7
September 30	"Love Is in the Air"	John Paul Young	7	October 14	5
October 7	"You Needed Me"	Anne Murray	1	November 4	8
October 7	"Whenever I Call You "Friend""	Kenny Loggins and Stevie Nicks	5	October 28	7
October 21	"MacArthur Park"	Donna Summer	1	November 11	9
October 28	"Double Vision"	Foreigner	2	November 18	6
October 28	"How Much I Feel"	Ambrosia	3	November 18	7
November 4	"Beast of Burden"	The Rolling Stones	8	November 11	2
November 4	"Get Off"	Foxy	9	November 11	2
November 11	"I Just Wanna Stop"	Gino Vannelli	4	December 9	8
November 18	"You Don't Bring Me Flowers"	Neil Diamond and Barbra Streisand	1	December 2	10
November 18	"You Never Done It Like That"	Captain & Tennille	10	November 18	2
November 25	"Le Freak"	Chic	1	December 9	15
November 25	"I Love the Nightlife"	Alicia Bridges	5	December 23	7
November 25	"Time Passages"	Al Stewart	7	December 9	4
December 9	"(Our Love) Don't Throw It All Away"	Andy Gibb	9	December 16	6

=== 1977 peaks ===
List of Billboard Hot 100 top ten singles in 1978 which peaked in 1977
Top ten entry date	Single	Artist(s)	Peak	Peak date	Weeks in top ten
October 8	"You Light Up My Life" (#3)	Debby Boone	1	October 15	14
November 12	"How Deep Is Your Love" (#6)	Bee Gees	1	December 24	17
November 19	"Blue Bayou"	Linda Ronstadt	3	December 17	8
December 3	"(Every Time I Turn Around) Back in Love Again"	L.T.D.	4	December 24	7

=== 1979 peaks ===
List of Billboard Hot 100 top ten singles in 1978 which peaked in 1979
Top ten entry date	Single	Artist(s)	Peak	Peak date	Weeks in top ten
December 2	"My Life"	Billy Joel	3	January 6	10
December 2	"Sharing the Night Together"	Dr. Hook	6	January 6	7
December 16	"Too Much Heaven"	Bee Gees	1	January 6	9
December 23	"Y.M.C.A."	Village People	2	February 3	12
December 23	"Hold the Line"	Toto	5	January 13	6

== See also ==
- 1978 in music
- List of Billboard Hot 100 number ones of 1978
- Billboard Year-End Hot 100 singles of 1978
