= Billboard Year-End Hot 100 singles of 1978 =

Ranking of recorded music

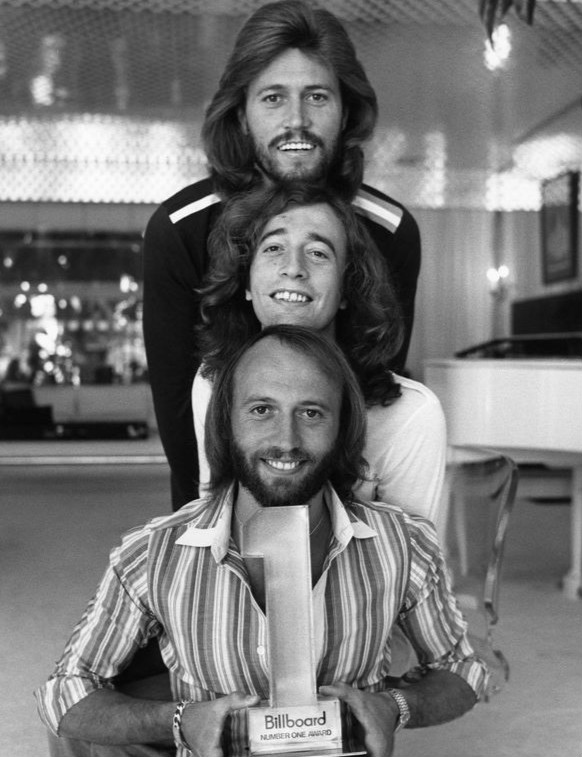
The Bee Gees had three songs on the Year-End Hot 100, "Night Fever" at 2, "Stayin' Alive" at 4, and "How Deep is Your Love" at 6.

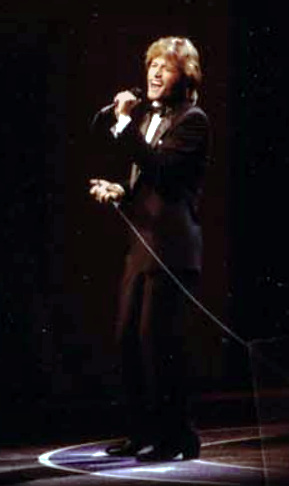
Andy Gibb had three songs on the Year-End Hot 100, including "Shadow Dancing", the number one hit of the year.

This is a list of Billboard magazine's Top Hot 100 songs of 1978. The Top 100, as revealed in the year-end edition of Billboard dated December 23, 1978.

No.	Title	Artist(s)
1	"Shadow Dancing"	Andy Gibb
2	"Night Fever"	Bee Gees
3	"You Light Up My Life"	Debby Boone
4	"Stayin' Alive"	Bee Gees
5	"Kiss You All Over"	Exile
6	"How Deep Is Your Love"	Bee Gees
7	"Baby Come Back"	Player
8	"(Love Is) Thicker Than Water"	Andy Gibb
9	"Boogie Oogie Oogie"	A Taste of Honey
10	"Three Times a Lady"	Commodores
11	"Grease"	Frankie Valli
12	"I Go Crazy"	Paul Davis
13	"You're the One That I Want"	John Travolta & Olivia Newton-John
14	"Emotion"	Samantha Sang
15	"Lay Down Sally"	Eric Clapton
16	"Miss You"	The Rolling Stones
17	"Just the Way You Are"	Billy Joel
18	"With a Little Luck"	Wings
19	"If I Can't Have You"	Yvonne Elliman
20	"Dance, Dance, Dance (Yowsah, Yowsah, Yowsah)"	Chic
21	"Feels So Good"	Chuck Mangione
22	"Hot Child in the City"	Nick Gilder
23	"Love Is Like Oxygen"	Sweet
24	"It's a Heartache"	Bonnie Tyler
25	"We Will Rock You" / "We Are the Champions"	Queen
26	"Baker Street"	Gerry Rafferty
27	"Can't Smile Without You"	Barry Manilow
28	"Too Much, Too Little, Too Late"	Johnny Mathis & Deniece Williams
29	"Dance With Me"	Peter Brown
30	"Two Out of Three Ain't Bad"	Meat Loaf
31	"Jack And Jill"	Raydio
32	"Take a Chance on Me"	ABBA
33	"Sometimes When We Touch"	Dan Hill
34	"Last Dance"	Donna Summer
35	"Hopelessly Devoted to You"	Olivia Newton-John
36	"Hot Blooded"	Foreigner
37	"You're in My Heart (The Final Acclaim)"	Rod Stewart
38	"The Closer I Get to You"	Roberta Flack & Donny Hathaway
39	"Dust in the Wind"	Kansas
40	"Magnet and Steel"	Walter Egan
41	"Short People"	Randy Newman
42	"Use ta Be My Girl"	The O'Jays
43	"Our Love"	Natalie Cole
44	"Love Will Find a Way"	Pablo Cruise
45	"An Everlasting Love"	Andy Gibb
46	"Love Is in the Air"	John Paul Young
47	"Goodbye Girl"	David Gates
48	"Slip Slidin' Away"	Paul Simon
49	"The Groove Line"	Heatwave
50	"Thunder Island"	Jay Ferguson
51	"Imaginary Lover"	Atlanta Rhythm Section
52	"Still the Same"	Bob Seger & The Silver Bullet Band
53	"My Angel Baby"	Toby Beau
54	"Disco Inferno"	The Trammps
55	"On Broadway"	George Benson
56	"Come Sail Away"	Styx
57	"(Every Time I Turn Around) Back in Love Again"	L.T.D.
58	"This Time I'm in It for Love"	Player
59	"You Belong to Me"	Carly Simon
60	"Here You Come Again"	Dolly Parton
61	"Blue Bayou"	Linda Ronstadt
62	"Peg"	Steely Dan
63	"You Needed Me"	Anne Murray
64	"Shame"	Evelyn "Champagne" King
65	"Reminiscing"	Little River Band
66	"Count On Me"	Jefferson Starship
67	"Baby Hold On"	Eddie Money
68	"Hey Deanie"	Shaun Cassidy
69	"Summer Nights"	John Travolta & Olivia Newton-John
70	"What's Your Name"	Lynyrd Skynyrd
71	"Don't It Make My Brown Eyes Blue"	Crystal Gayle
72	"Because the Night"	Patti Smith Group
73	"Every Kinda People"	Robert Palmer
74	"Copacabana"	Barry Manilow
75	"Always and Forever"	Heatwave
76	"You and I"	Rick James
77	"Serpentine Fire"	Earth, Wind & Fire
78	"Sentimental Lady"	Bob Welch
79	"Falling"	LeBlanc & Carr
80	"Don't Let Me Be Misunderstood"	Santa Esmeralda
81	"Bluer Than Blue"	Michael Johnson
82	"Running on Empty"	Jackson Browne
83	"Whenever I Call You 'Friend'"	Kenny Loggins & Stevie Nicks
84	"Fool (If You Think It's Over)"	Chris Rea
85	"Get Off"	Foxy
86	"Sweet Talkin' Woman"	Electric Light Orchestra
87	"Life's Been Good"	Joe Walsh
88	"I Love the Nightlife"	Alicia Bridges
89	"You Can't Turn Me Off (In The Middle Of Turning Me On)"	High Inergy
90	"It's So Easy"	Linda Ronstadt
91	"Native New Yorker"	Odyssey
92	"Flash Light"	Parliament
93	"Don't Look Back"	Boston
94	"Turn to Stone"	Electric Light Orchestra
95	"I Can't Stand the Rain"	Eruption
96	"Ebony Eyes"	Bob Welch
97	"The Name of the Game"	ABBA
98	"We're All Alone"	Rita Coolidge
99	"Hollywood Nights"	Bob Seger & The Silver Bullet Band
100	"Deacon Blues"	Steely Dan

== See also ==
- 1978 in music
- Billboard Year-End Hot Soul Singles of 1978
- List of Billboard Hot 100 number-one singles of 1978
- List of Billboard Hot 100 top-ten singles in 1978
