= Time Is Time =

Single by Andy Gibb

from the album Andy Gibb's Greatest Hits
- B-side: "I Go for You"
- Released: November 1980
- Recorded: Mid–1980; Middle Ear Studios, Miami Beach
- Genre: Pop Rock
- Length: 3:40 (single version); 4:03 (album version)
- Label: RSO
- Songwriters: Andy Gibb, Barry Gibb
- Producer: Gibb-Galuten-Richardson

Andy Gibb singles chronology
"Rest Your Love on Me" (1980)	"Time Is Time" (1980)	"Me (Without You)" (1981)

"Time Is Time" is a song written by Andy and Barry Gibb. Andy Gibb released the song as a single in November 1980 and it was included on Andy Gibb's Greatest Hits. The B-side, "I Go for You" was originally from his 1978 album Shadow Dancing.

== Background and release ==
"Time Is Time" was recorded in the middle of 1980 at Middle Ear Studios in Miami Beach. It was credited to Andy himself with his brother Barry, but Andy said later that it was his own composition with one change by Barry. Its full ending, when the musicians stop, Andy continues to sing a few more words, and drummer Steve Gadd hits the hi-hat again, but when it was released, it ends with the fadeout.

The song reached No. 15 on the Billboard Hot 100 and No. 29 on the US Adult Contemporary chart in 1980. The track appeared on his 1980 album, Andy Gibb's Greatest Hits and was the first single and one of the new cuts on that album. as well as 2010's Mythology box set. The song was produced by Barry Gibb, Albhy Galuten and Karl Richardson. The song is also known for breaking a streak of Andy Gibb's top 10 records. The song spent 11 weeks in the Top 40.

It was edited for its single release with one less repeat of the chorus at the end. When it appeared for the first time in CD format through the compilation Andy Gibb it fades out early at 3:41.

== Personnel ==
- Andy Gibb — lead and backing vocals
- Barry Gibb — backing vocals, acoustic guitar
- Joey Murcia — electric guitar
- George Terry — electric guitar
- Cornell Dupree — electric guitar
- Harold Cowart — bass guitar
- Steve Gadd — drums

== Chart positions ==
Chart (1980–1981)	Peak positions
Austria (Ö3 Austria Top 40)	17
Germany (Media Control Charts)	44
US Billboard Hot 100	15
US Billboard Hot Adult Contemporary Tracks	29
US Cash Box	19
US Radio & Records	18
US Record World	21

Year-end chart (1981)	Rank
US Top Pop Singles (Billboard)	100
