= Shadow Dancing =

Shadow Dancing may refer to:

- Shadow Dancing (album), a 1978 album by Andy Gibb
  - "Shadow Dancing" (song), a 1978 song on the album of the same name
- "Shadow Dancing" (Babylon 5), a 1996 Babylon 5 episode
- Shadow dancing, a variation of the country/western two-step

== See also ==
- Shadow play, a form of ancient Chinese puppetry
