= After Dark (Andy Gibb album) =

Studio album by Andy Gibb
- Released: February 1980
- Recorded: May, October & November 1979
- Studio: Criteria Recording Studios (Miami)
- Genre: Post-disco
- Length: 40:57
- Label: RSO
- Producer: Gibb-Galuten-Richardson

Andy Gibb chronology
Shadow Dancing (1978)	After Dark (1980)	Andy Gibb's Greatest Hits (1980)

Singles from After Dark
- 1. "Desire" Released: January 1980; 2. "I Can't Help It" Released: March 1980; 3. "Rest Your Love on Me" Released: 1980

After Dark is the third and final studio album by English singer-songwriter Andy Gibb, released in February 1980, by RSO Records. It features Gibb's last US Top 10 single "Desire" (No. 4), along with "I Can't Help It" (a duet with Olivia Newton-John) and two Bee Gees numbers "Rest Your Love on Me" (also a duet with Olivia Newton-John) and "Warm Ride".

Although the album is not currently in print, it was released to music streaming platforms along with the other two Andy Gibb albums in 2011.

== Overview ==
Around the time that Barry Gibb was co-writing and recording demos for Barbra Streisand and her future Guilty album, Andy Gibb was struggling with drug-related issues that affected his ability to write and record music. Barry provided significant support, writing new songs and reusing old ones for the album, assisting him during the recording process, and, imitating Andy's voice, filling in lines or phrases that were missed.

After Dark was Andy's final studio album; his first compilation Andy Gibb's Greatest Hits was released in September 1980 with three new songs. In 1981, he later performed on Canadian band Flower's "Here Inside", releasing his last single "All I Have to Do Is Dream", a duet with his partner at that time, actress Victoria Principal. Around the same time as the song was recorded, he attempted to record "Will You Love Me Tomorrow" again.

== Recording ==
The album was recorded in May, continuing in October and finishing in November 1979 at the Criteria Studios. "Desire" was originally a Bee Gees song that was recorded in 1978 on the sessions of Spirits Having Flown with Barry on lead vocals but was later dropped on the album. Andy's version was recorded on 30 May 1979. Related songs that were not released from the sessions include, "Warm", "Back to the Wind" (both written by Andy), and "For You" (written by Barry). Andy and Olivia Newton-John had previously performed "Rest Your Love on Me" on a UNICEF show in January that year, and later she agreed to record it in the studio as part of the album track on this album. His rendition of "Warm Ride" by the Bee Gees which was an outtake from Saturday Night Fever sessions was also included on this LP. Years later, co-producer Albhy Galuten said of it, "I don't know how that got on there". The title track and "Wherever You Are" features Andy and Barry singing together. The ballad "Dreamin' On" closes the album.

Aside from producing, arranging the orchestra for some songs and playing synthesizers, Galuten also co-wrote "Falling in Love With You" with Barry. The album also features guitar work from famous session musician Hugh McCracken as well as The Brecker Brothers, Randy and Michael.

== Release ==
In March 1980, the last of Gibb's top ten singles charted just ahead of the album's release, "Desire". Two duets with family friend Olivia Newton-John followed as singles, "I Can't Help It", which reached the top twenty, and "Rest Your Love on Me". Unlike the Bee Gees version of "Warm Ride", Andy's version was recorded in slower tempo and was not sung in falsetto.

The album's disappointing performance, coupled with Gibb's mounting drug problems, would lead to RSO Records dropping Gibb from its roster. On VH1's Behind the Music, label founder Robert Stigwood said that he was heartbroken at having to make the decision to drop Gibb, but that his behaviour gave him very little choice.

== Critical reception ==
Professional ratings
Review scores
Source	Rating
AllMusic	2.5/5 stars

Stephen Thomas Erlewine of AllMusic wrote that After Dark "found Andy Gibb beginning to run out of steam". He noted that the album was "stylistically" similar to its predecessor, but did not have an equally "consistent set of songs." Erlewine considered that even "if it was clear that Gibb's career would not be able to survive in the post-disco era", the album had a number of "fine moments" that made it "worthwhile" for dedicated fans.

== Track listing ==
All tracks are written by Barry Gibb, except where noted.

Side one
No.	Title	Writer(s)	Length
1.	"After Dark"		4:17
2.	"Desire"	B. Gibb; Robin Gibb; Maurice Gibb	4:26
3.	"Wherever You Are"		4:27
4.	"Warm Ride"	B. Gibb; R. Gibb; M. Gibb	3:30
5.	"Rest Your Love on Me" (duet with Olivia Newton-John)		4:53

Side two
No.	Title	Writer(s)	Length
1.	"I Can't Help It" (duet with Olivia Newton-John)		4:07
2.	"One Love"	B. Gibb; Andy Gibb	4:06
3.	"Someone I Ain't"	B. Gibb; A. Gibb	3:08
4.	"Falling in Love With You"	B. Gibb; Albhy Galuten	4:12
5.	"Dreamin' On"		3:51
Total length:			40:57

== Personnel ==
Adapted from the album's liner notes.

The Andy Gibb Band

- Andy Gibb – lead vocals, co-lead vocals (5, 6), backing vocals
- Harold Cowart – bass guitar
- Joey Murcia – guitars
- George Bitzer – keyboards, synthesizers
- Ron Ziegler – drums
- George Terry – guitars

Additional musicians

- Barry Gibb – vocals (2), backing vocals, guitar, synthesizer
- Maurice Gibb – vocals (2)
- Robin Gibb – vocals (2)
- Olivia Newton-John – co-lead vocals (5, 6)
- Charlie Chalmers – backing vocals
- Donna Rhodes – backing vocals
- Sandy Rhodes – backing vocals

Guest musicians

- Joe Lala; Tom Roady – percussion
- Tim Renwick – guitar
- Hugh McCracken – guitar
- Albhy Galuten – keyboards, string conductor
- Blue Weaver – keyboards
- Dennis Bryon – drums
- Alan Kendall – guitar

Horns

- Michael Brecker
- Randy Brecker
- Whit Sidener
- Peter Graves

- Neal Bonsanti
- Dan Bonsanti
- Kenny Faulk
- Bill Purse

Production

- Barry Gibb – producer, string arrangements
- Karl Richardson – producer, engineer
- Albhy Galuten – producer, string arrangements
- Dennis Hetzendorfer – assistant engineer
- Mike Fuller – mastering
- Gene Orloff – New York string contractor
- Ed Caraeff – design, art direction
- Caraeff Studio – photography
- Arthur Johns – hair styling

== Charts ==
=== Weekly charts ===
Chart (1980)	Peak position
Norwegian VG-lista Albums Chart	21
Swedish Albums Chart	23
Canada RPM 100 Albums	24
US Billboard 200	21
US Billboard Top R&B/Hip-Hop Albums	67

=== Year-end charts ===
Chart (1980)	Position
Norwegian Albums Chart	40
Swedish Albums Chart	30

== Certifications ==
Region	Certification	Certified units/sales
Hong Kong (IFPI Hong Kong)	Gold	10,000^{*}
United States (RIAA)	Gold	500,000^{^}
^{*} Sales figures based on certification alone.^{^} Shipments figures based on certification alone.
