= Desire (Bee Gees song) =

Original song written and composed by Barry, Maurice, and Robin Gibb

"Desire" is a song written by Barry Gibb, Robin Gibb and Maurice Gibb, and originally recorded by the Bee Gees in 1978 during the sessions of Spirits Having Flown. Blue Weaver recalls that this version was originally intended for the album. After spending weeks on it, they dropped it from the album lineup. Weaver also recalls that the version sounded like "Too Much Heaven".

== Andy Gibb version ==
"Desire"

Single by Andy Gibb

from the album After Dark
- B-side: "Waiting for You"
- Released: January 1980
- Recorded: 1978 (instrumental tracks); 30 May 1979 (lead vocals)
- Genre: Disco, R&B
- Length: 4:29
- Label: RSO
- Songwriter: Barry, Robin & Maurice Gibb
- Producer: Gibb-Galuten-Richardson

Andy Gibb singles chronology
"Why" (1978)	"Desire" (1980)	"I Can't Help It" (1980)

Music video
- "Desire" (TopPop, 1980) on YouTube

The single was recorded with a new lead vocal by Andy Gibb during a studio session in 1979, and released as the lead single on what would be his final studio album. The instrumental tracks used are from the original recording sessions laid down by the Bee Gees in 1978. The copyright for this song gives the artist as the 'Bee Gees' and was registered on July 11, 1979. Desire was Andy's first new single since September 1978.

Andy's version of "Desire" was released as a single in January 1980 and included on his last studio album After Dark reaching number four on the Billboard Hot 100. Any sense that Andy was channeling the Bee Gees rather than finding his own way would be confirmed here, as all three of his brothers were heard in the background. This is one of two songs to feature all four Gibb brothers (the other being Andy's final song, "Arrow Through The Heart", issued posthumously in 2010, 23 years after it was originally recorded.) His version would be his last top ten single in the United States. In other countries this single and its B-side "Waiting For You" which was from his Shadow Dancing album were released as a double A.

Record World said of it that "Andy's soft and lush vocal, with some intelligent percussion, incites."

The song was included as the last track on Andy Gibb's Greatest Hits, his first compilation album, as well as Greatest Hits Collection and 20th Century Masters - The Millennium Collection.

=== Personnel ===
- Andy Gibb — lead and background vocals
- Barry Gibb — harmony and background vocals, orchestral arrangement
- Hugh McCracken — electric guitar
- Joey Murcia — electric guitar
- George Terry — electric guitar
- George Bitzer — keyboards
- Harold Cowart — bass
- Ron Ziegler — drums
- Robin Gibb — background vocals (from 1978)
- Maurice Gibb — background vocals (from 1978)
- Albhy Galuten — orchestral arrangement

=== Charts ===
==== Peak positions ====
Chart (1980)	Peak position
Australia (Kent Music Report)	90
Belgium (Ultratop)	8
Canada (RPM)	10
Canada Adult Contemporary (RPM)	7
Germany (Media Control Charts)	36
Netherlands (Dutch Top 40)	21
New Zealand (Recorded Music NZ)	38
Spain (PROMUSICAE)	7
US Billboard Hot 100	4
US Billboard Adult Contemporary	9
US Billboard Hot Soul Singles	49
US Cash Box	6
US Radio & Records	7
US Record World	4

==== Year-end charts ====
Chart (1980)	Position
Belgium (Ultratop)	17
Netherlands (Dutch Top 40)	41
New Zealand (Recorded Music NZ)	40
US Top Pop Singles (Billboard)	58
