= Words and Music (song) =

Single by Andy Gibb
- B-side: "Westfield Mansions"
- Released: November 1975 (Australia)
- Recorded: 1975
- Studio: ATA Sound Studio
- Length: 3:35
- Label: ATA
- Songwriter(s): Andy Gibb
- Producer(s): Col Joye

Andy Gibb singles chronology
"Words and Music" (1975)	"I Just Want to Be Your Everything" (1977)

"Words and Music" is the first single released by Andy Gibb, reaching number 78 in Australia and number 29 in New Zealand.

This single was never issued on LP or CD. This single and its B-side "Westfield Mansions" was released in Australia as a double A-side. Gibb performed this song on Countdown on September 7, 1975.

== Recording ==
The song was produced by Col Joye, who also produced the Bee Gees' first singles in Australia.

On the 1975 recording, Gibb played guitar. The song was arranged by Billy Weston and engineered by Ron Patton.

Gibb re-recorded this song in 1976 for his album Flowing Rivers released in 1977. It was later released as a B-side of "(Love Is) Thicker Than Water". The 1976 version was produced by Albhy Galuten and Karl Richardson.

== Personnel ==
- Andy Gibb — vocals, rhythm guitar
- Billy Weston — arrangement
- Ron Patton — engineer

== Charts ==
Chart (1975)	Peak position
Australia (Kent Music Report)	78
New Zealand (Recorded Music NZ)	29
