= Gibb-Galuten-Richardson =

British-American record producing team

- Origin: Miami, Florida, U.S.
- Genres: Pop rock; disco; R&B; soul; country; funk; soft rock
- Occupation: Record producers
- Years active: 1976–1985
- Labels: RSO; Columbia; Arista; RCA
- Members: Barry Gibb; Albhy Galuten; Karl Richardson

Gibb-Galuten-Richardson were a British-American record producing team, consisting of Bee Gees founding member and British singer-songwriter Barry Gibb, American musician and songwriter Albhy Galuten and American sound engineer Karl Richardson. They produced albums and singles for Andy Gibb, Samantha Sang, Frankie Valli, Teri DeSario, Barbra Streisand, Dionne Warwick, Kenny Rogers, Dolly Parton and Diana Ross.

The trio produced five number-one singles in the US, and six singles that reached the US top 10.

== Origin ==
Because Bee Gees' manager and RSO Records head Robert Stigwood had ended his US distribution arrangement with Atlantic Records, Atlantic producer Arif Mardin, who had produced the Bee Gees' previous two albums (including their "comeback" album Main Course), was no longer permitted to work with the group. In an effort to retain the same sound, the group recorded its next album, 1976's Children of the World, at the same studios (Criteria Studios in Miami) using the same engineer that Mardin had used, Karl Richardson. At first, the Bee Gees recruited Richard Perry to take over as producer, but Perry and the group parted company after only a couple of weeks amidst disagreement over the musical direction the group should take, which the group insisted should remain the same as Mardin's vision. At this point the Bee Gees decided to produce the album themselves, with Barry Gibb taking the lead role, along with engineer Richardson. They added young musician and arranger Albhy Galuten to the control room as musical adviser. The new team of Gibb, Richardson and Galuten saw the group through a series of top-selling recordings over the next nine years.

== Fame ==
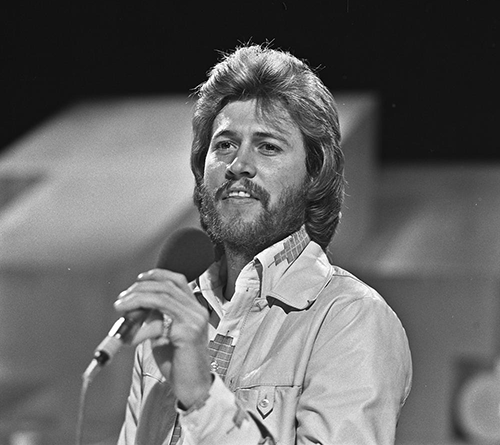
Barry Gibb performing in 1973.

A few months after Children of the World, the trio worked together again on Andy Gibb's Flowing Rivers album, recorded in October 1976. Barry and Joe Walsh also performed on two songs from the album, "I Just Want to Be Your Everything" and "(Love Is) Thicker Than Water" (both US No. 1), although the album was mainly produced by Galuten and Richardson. The album was released in late 1977. Gibb-Galuten-Richardson later crafted songs for a diverse roster of talent, including producing four other US Top 10 singles for Andy Gibb such as "Shadow Dancing", "An Everlasting Love" and "(Our Love) Don't Throw it All Away". Samantha Sang's 1977 hit "Emotion", which the trio produced, reached No. 3 on the Billboard Hot 100. Another song the trio produced was "Save Me, Save Me" by Network (the first song credited to Gibb and Galuten). The trio also produced singles by Frankie Valli ("Grease") and Teri DeSario ("Ain't Nothing Gonna Keep Me From You").

In 1979, the Bee Gees (including Barry), Galuten and Richardson won the Grammys for Best Producer of the Year, Non-Classical.

The trio's last project on an Andy Gibb full album was After Dark which contains his last US Top 5 single "Desire", although Andy Gibb's Greatest Hits (released September 1980) album contains only three new songs.

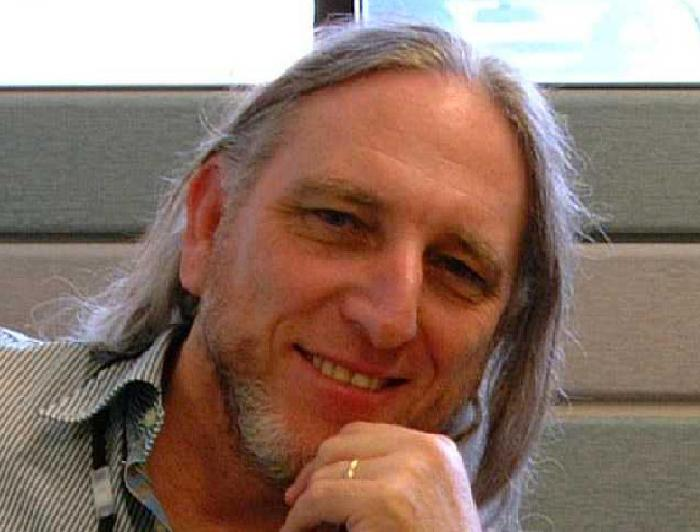
Albhy Galuten

In 1980, the trio produced Barbra Streisand's Guilty which became Streisand's best-selling album to date internationally when it was released, with sales of 12 million. The album features three US Top 10 singles, including the No. 1 hit "Woman In Love," "Guilty" and "What Kind of Fool" (the latter two being duets between Streisand and Gibb).

Their next production was in 1982 when Clive Davis, the president of Arista Records asked Barry Gibb to write songs for Dionne Warwick who recorded for Arista. Heartbreaker was released in October 1982; the title track reached No. 10 in the US and No. 2 in the UK, while the album reached No. 25 on the Billboard 200.

Also in 1982, Barry met Kenny Rogers and Rogers asked Barry about writing some songs for him. By August, Barry started recording demos for Rogers by doing the demo of "Eyes That See in the Dark". The release of Rogers' Eyes That See in the Dark album reached No. 1 on US Country charts. The lead single on Rogers' album was a duet between himself and fellow country singer Dolly Parton entitled "Islands in the Stream" that became US No. 1 hit in the Billboard Hot 100, Country Charts, Adult Contemporary Charts and on Canadian Country Charts, and was also certified Platinum by the Recording Industry Association of America for selling over two million physical copies in the US. In 1984, when Barry Gibb was recording his first solo album, Galuten was not available at the sessions as he traveled to California the previous year after he disagreed with Barry. As a result, the album Now Voyager was credited only to Barry and Richardson.

In 1985, Barry had teamed again with Galuten and Richardson to produce an album for another American recording artist Diana Ross entitled Eaten Alive. But it was the trio's last album production. Eaten Alive was released on the RCA label in the US where it was deemed a commercial failure, selling fewer than 300,000 US copies. The title track was produced by the trio with Michael Jackson, who also co-wrote the track.

== Later years ==
After the Eaten Alive album, the trio separated. In February 1986, Gibb and Richardson reunited again for Gibb's second solo album Moonlight Madness, but the album was rejected by MCA and the other songs from the album were later included on the soundtrack of the film Hawks. After that, Richardson did not work with Gibb again.

== Production discography ==
=== Albums ===
- Andy Gibb – Flowing Rivers (1977)
- Andy Gibb – Shadow Dancing (1978)
- Andy Gibb – After Dark (1980)
- Andy Gibb – Andy Gibb's Greatest Hits (1980, three new songs)
- Barbra Streisand – Guilty (1980)
- Dionne Warwick – Heartbreaker (1982)
- Kenny Rogers – Eyes That See in the Dark (1983)
- Diana Ross – Eaten Alive (1985)

=== Singles ===
- Samantha Sang – "Emotion" (1977)
- Network – "Save Me, Save Me" (1977)
- Frankie Valli – "Grease" (1978)
- Teri DeSario – "Ain't Nothing Gonna Keep Me From You" (1978)
- Andy Gibb and Olivia Newton-John – "I Can't Help It" (1980)
