= An Everlasting Love =

Single by Andy Gibb

from the album Shadow Dancing
- B-side: "Flowing Rivers"
- Released: June 1978
- Recorded: 1977–1978
- Studio: Criteria (Miami)
- Genre: Pop, disco, easy listening
- Length: 4:08 (album version) 3:46 (promo version)
- Label: RSO
- Songwriter: Barry Gibb
- Producer: Gibb-Galuten-Richardson

Andy Gibb singles chronology
| "Shadow Dancing" (1978) | "An Everlasting Love" (1978) | "(Our Love) Don't Throw It All Away" (1978) |

"An Everlasting Love" is a song written by Barry Gibb, performed by Andy Gibb, released in June 1978 by RSO Records as the second single from his second studio album Shadow Dancing. It was produced by Gibb-Galuten-Richardson. The song peaked at #5 on the Hot 100 on 23 September 1978 and #10 in the UK. "An Everlasting Love" was Gibb's only Top 10 hit in the United Kingdom.

"An Everlasting Love" became a Gold record. It was his fourth of five hits to do so. Its B-side "Flowing Rivers" was the title song of his first album (1977).

== Information ==
"An Everlasting Love" was written by Barry Gibb for Andy, who also produced it along with Albhy Galuten and Karl Richardson. Barry Gibb arranged the orchestra and provided falsetto vocals on the chorus.

Andy Gibb's headstone reads Andy Gibb / March 5, 1958 - March 10, 1988 / "An Everlasting Love".

== Reception ==
Cash Box said it has an "arrangement of soft, hazy vocals, rhythm guitar touches and string backing" and that "the non-stop flow of the lyric is particularly appealing." Record World said that the song has "much the feeling of 'Shadow Dancing.'"

== Track listing ==
1. "An Everlasting Love" (Barry Gibb) - 4:06
2. "Flowing Rivers" (Andy Gibb) - 3:37

UK

1. "An Everlasting Love" - 4:06
2. "I Just Want to Be Your Everything" - 3:45
3. "(Love Is) Thicker Than Water" - 4:15

France

1. "An Everlasting Love" - 4:06
2. "(Love Is) Thicker Than Water" - 4:15

== Charts ==
=== Weekly charts ===
| Chart (1978) | Peak position |
|---|---|
| Australia (Kent Music Report) | 57 |
| Canada (RPM) Top Singles | 2 |
| Canada (RPM) Adult Contemporary | 2 |
| Ireland (IRMA) | 4 |
| Japan (Oricon) | 28 |
| New Zealand (Recorded Music NZ) | 28 |
| UK Singles (Official Charts Company) | 10 |
| US Billboard Hot 100 | 5 |
| US Billboard Easy Listening | 8 |
| US Cash Box | 5 |
| US Radio & Records | 6 |
| US Record World | 9 |

=== Year-end charts ===
| Chart (1978) | Rank |
|---|---|
| Canada (RPM) Top Singles | 38 |
| New Zealand (Recorded Music NZ) | 30 |
| US Billboard Hot 100 | 45 |
| US Cash Box | 80 |

== Certifications ==
- RIAA: Gold
