= (Our Love) Don't Throw It All Away =

Song by Andy Gibb

Single by Andy Gibb

from the album Shadow Dancing
- B-side: "One More Look at the Night"
- Released: September 1978
- Recorded: December 1977 – January 1978
- Studio: Wally Heider Studios (Los Angeles, California)
- Genre: Soft rock; soul
- Length: 4:08 (album version); 3:38 (single version)
- Label: RSO Records
- Songwriters: Barry Gibb; Blue Weaver
- Producer: Gibb-Galuten-Richardson

Andy Gibb singles chronology
"An Everlasting Love" (1978)	"(Our Love) Don't Throw It All Away" (1978)	"Why" (1978)

"(Our Love) Don't Throw It All Away" is a song penned by Barry Gibb and Blue Weaver and recorded by the Bee Gees in 1977 on the Saturday Night Fever sessions but was not released until Bee Gees Greatest (1979). A different version was released in September 1978 by RSO Records as the third single by Andy Gibb from his second studio album Shadow Dancing. His version was produced by Gibb-Galuten-Richardson.

== Andy Gibb's version ==
The song was Andy Gibb's fifth single to reach the US Top 10; the single reached No. 9 on the Billboard Hot 100 chart and No. 2 on the Adult Contemporary chart. When Andy Gibb was going to record it, Barry reworked on the song adding the middle eight that was not on the original Bee Gees' version, as Blue Weaver recalls, "When Andy actually went to record it, Barry listened to it [the original version] again and thought, 'Oh, it's not finished', so Barry wrote the whole of the middle-eight.

Allmusic's Amy Hanson described this version of "(Our Love) Don't Throw It All Away" as a "tender ballad" that suited Andy's voice. Cash Box said it has "gentle keyboards, strings, an easy beat and harmonies". It appears on Andy's three greatest-hits albums.

=== Personnel ===
- Andy Gibb – lead vocals
- Barry Gibb – backing vocals
- Joey Murcia – guitar
- Tim Renwick – guitar
- George Bitzer – Keyboards, synthesizer
- Paul Harris – keyboards
- Harold Cowart – bass
- Joe Lala – percussion
- Ron Ziegler – drums
- Whit Sidener – horns
- Ken Faulk – horns
- Bill Purse – horns
- Neil Bonsanti – horns
- Stan Webb – horns
- Albhy Galuten, Blue Weaver and Barry Gibb – orchestral arrangement

== Chart performance ==
=== Weekly charts ===
Chart (1978–1979)	Peak position
Australia (Kent Music Report)	61
Brazil (ABPD)	7
Canada (RPM) Top Singles	8
Canada (RPM) Adult Contemporary	5
Ireland (IRMA)	21
Japan (Oricon)	27
UK Singles (Official Charts Company)	32
US Cash Box Top 100	7
US Billboard Adult Contemporary	2
US Radio & Records	10
US Billboard Hot 100	9

=== Year-end charts ===
Chart (1978)	Rank
Canada RPM Top Singles	93

Chart (1979)	Rank
US Billboard Hot 100	58

== Bee Gees' version ==
"(Our Love) Don't Throw It All Away"

Song by Bee Gees

from the album Bee Gees Greatest
- Released: October 1979
- Recorded: February and March 1977; Le Chateau, Herouville, France; April 1977; Criteria Studios, Miami, Florida
- Genre: Soul, soft rock, pop
- Length: 4:02
- Label: RSO
- Songwriters: Barry Gibb, Blue Weaver
- Producers: Bee Gees, Albhy Galuten, Karl Richardson

The Bee Gees version of the song, the first one created, was recorded in 1977 during the sessions for Saturday Night Fever but was not released until the compilation Bee Gees Greatest in 1979. Barry and Maurice Gibb are the only members of the Bee Gees to appear on the recording.

Barry wrote the lyrics while Weaver composed the melody. Weaver said of this song, "That was me playing around again; It wasn't done for [Saturday Night Fever], it was just something that we did". The stereo mix of an early state of the song exists but was unreleased until now. Samantha Sang, who was visiting France where this version was recorded, asked Barry for a song; not long afterwards, Barry sent Sang "Don't Throw it All Away", but Sang never recorded or released it, choosing instead the new song "Emotion".

After Andy's death, during the Bee Gees' One Night Only tour, they performed the song with Andy's original lead vocal mixed in during the second verse, chorus, bridge and the coda of the song.

=== Personnel ===
- Barry Gibb – vocals, guitar
- Andy Gibb – background vocals
- Maurice Gibb – bass
- Blue Weaver – keyboards, orchestral arrangement
- Dennis Bryon – drums
- Joe Lala – percussion

== Other versions ==
- Jennifer Love Hewitt also covered the song on her 1996 self-titled album.
- Barbra Streisand recorded her rendition of the song in 2005 off her album Guilty Pleasures, which had Barry Gibb on the album cover with her. On Streisand's version, Barry Gibb is heard singing also the chorus.
