= Shadow Dancing (album) =

Studio album by Andy Gibb
- Released: June 1978 (US); September 1978 (UK)
- Recorded: December 1977 – February 1978
- Studio: Criteria (Miami); Wally Heider (Los Angeles)
- Genre: Disco; pop rock; soft rock; country
- Length: 40:41
- Label: RSO
- Producer: Albhy Galuten; Karl Richardson; Barry Gibb (executive producer)

Andy Gibb studio albums chronology
Flowing Rivers (1977)	Shadow Dancing (1978)	After Dark (1980)

Singles from Shadow Dancing
- 1. "Shadow Dancing" Released: April 1978; 2. "An Everlasting Love" Released: June 1978; 3. "(Our Love) Don't Throw It All Away" Released: September 1978; 4. "Why" Released: September 1978

Shadow Dancing is the second studio album by English singer Andy Gibb, released by RSO Records in June 1978 in the United States and September 1978 in the United Kingdom. It was Gibb's highest-charting album in some countries including America and in Canada. This LP was his only album to chart in the UK. Four singles, including the three US Top 10 singles, were released from the album.

Continuing the momentum of his first successes, notably "I Just Want to Be Your Everything", he began work with the Gibb-Galuten-Richardson production team on his second album. Although the album is not currently in print, it was released to iTunes along with the other two Andy Gibb albums in 2011.

== Overview ==
Gibb's second album was made under the direction of Albhy Galuten and Karl Richardson, mostly while Barry, Robin and Maurice were off filming Sgt. Pepper's Lonely Hearts Club Band. Shadow Dancing was recorded from December 1977 to February 1978.

Barry became the album's executive producer once again and was present during recording of a few of the songs. John Sambataro, who sang backing and harmony vocals on the non-Barry songs, plays slide guitar. Sambataro later worked with Dave Mason and McGuinn, Clark & Hillman and he later joined Firefall. "Why" features a slide guitar by John Sambataro, as well as the guitar work of Jock Bartley of Firefall, "I Go for You" features guitar work by Don Felder of Eagles.

Gibb also relied on Galuten's musical expertise to help translate his musical ideas into reality by co-writing some of the songs with him, as Gibb said: "He'll sit down at the keyboards and find chords that we're hearing. He's magic. He hears exactly what you're hearing. 'One More Look at the Night' – that came across in 10 or 15 minutes".

In February 1978, Gibb participated on Stephen Stills' songs "You Can't Dance Alone" and "What's the Game" singing backing vocals along with Dave Mason, from the album Thoroughfare Gap and Gibb's band including Joey Murcia, George Perry, John Sambataro and Joe Lala also plays on both songs. (Back in 1976, Stills visited the Bee Gees recording Children of the World and played percussion on "You Should Be Dancing".)

== Release ==
The album's title track, written by Gibb and all three of his brothers, was released as a single in the US in April 1978 and in mid-June began a seven-week run at No. 1 on the Billboard Hot 100 chart, achieving platinum status. The album also spawned two other US top ten singles, "An Everlasting Love" (No. 5) and "(Our Love) Don't Throw It All Away" (No. 9), a song also released by his brothers in their 1979 Greatest Hits album.

Gibb, talking about his recently finished album, said "I am so much more confident now after doing this second album, dealing with the pressures of proving to myself that the first one wasn't a fluke and that I could write a second album. So now I am a lot more confident". Following the release of Shadow Dancing, RSO arranged a mini-tour of Europe to promote the new album, with planned concerts in the UK as well as other European countries. The album was reissued by Spectrum Records in 1992 and Polydor Records in 1998. Rights to the album are now owned by Andy's daughter Peta Gibb Weber, and Capitol has made the album available through online music stores and streaming sites.

== Critical reception ==
Professional ratings
Review scores
Source	Rating
AllMusic	4/5 stars

Amy Hanson of AllMusic noted that while the album's singles "all bear the mark of one or more of Gibb's brothers", his "own material shows great, if as yet unrealized, promise." She also retrospectively described "Fool for a Night" as a "bittersweet, up tempo piece of pop", "Melody" as a "wistful love song", and "I Go for You", "smarmy as it may be in hindsight", as "better than many of its contemporaries".

== Track listing ==
All tracks are written by Andy Gibb, except where noted.

Side one
No.	Title	Writer(s)	Length
1.	"Shadow Dancing"	Barry Gibb; Robin Gibb; Maurice Gibb; Andy Gibb	4:34
2.	"Why"	A. Gibb; B. Gibb	4:31
3.	"Fool for a Night"		3:20
4.	"An Everlasting Love"	B. Gibb	4:06
5.	"(Our Love) Don't Throw It All Away"	B. Gibb; Blue Weaver	4:07

Side two
No.	Title	Length
1.	"One More Look at the Night"	3:45
2.	"Melody"	4:00
3.	"I Go For You"	4:19
4.	"Good Feeling"	3:46
5.	"Waiting For You"	4:13
Total length:		40:41

== Personnel ==
Adapted from the album's liner notes.

Musicians

- Andy Gibb – lead vocals, backing vocals
- Barry Gibb – backing vocals
- John Sambataro – backing vocals, slide guitar (2)
- Joey Murcia – electric guitar
- Tim Renwick – acoustic guitar, electric guitar
- George Bitzer – keyboards
- Ron "Tubby" Ziegler – drums
- Harold Cowart – bass guitar
- Albhy Galuten – synthesizers, string conductor
- Joe Lala – percussion
- Jock Bartley – guitar (2)
- Paul Harris – keyboards (5)
- Don Felder – guitar (8)
- Sid Sharp – string section leader (L.A.)
- Bob Basso – string section leader (Miami)

Boneroo Horns

- Peter Graves
- Ken Faulk
- Whit Sidener
- Bill Purse
- Neal Bonsanti
- Stan Webb

Production

- Albhy Galuten – co-producer, string arrangements (1–10)
- Karl Richardson – co-producer, engineer
- Barry Gibb – co-producer (1, 2, 4, 5), executive producer (3, 6–10), string arrangements (1, 4–6, 9)
- John Blanche; Dennis Hetzendorfer – assistant engineers (at Criteria Recording Studios)
- David Gertz – assistant engineer (at Wally Heider Studio)
- Blue Weaver – string arrangements (5)
- Glenn Ross – art direction
- Tim Bryant (Gribbitt!) – album design
- Gary Heery – photography

== Charts ==
=== Weekly charts ===
Chart (1978–1979)	Position
Australian Kent Music Report	28
Canadian RPM Albums Chart	1
Swedish Albums Chart	42
New Zealand RIANZ Albums Chart	15
Norwegian VG-lista Albums Chart	8
UK Albums Chart	15
US Billboard 200	7
US Billboard R&B Albums	18

=== Year-end charts ===
Chart (1978–1979)	Position
New Zealand Albums Chart	34
Norwegian Albums Chart	14
Swedish Albums Chart	42
