= Andy Gibb =

British singer (1958–1988)

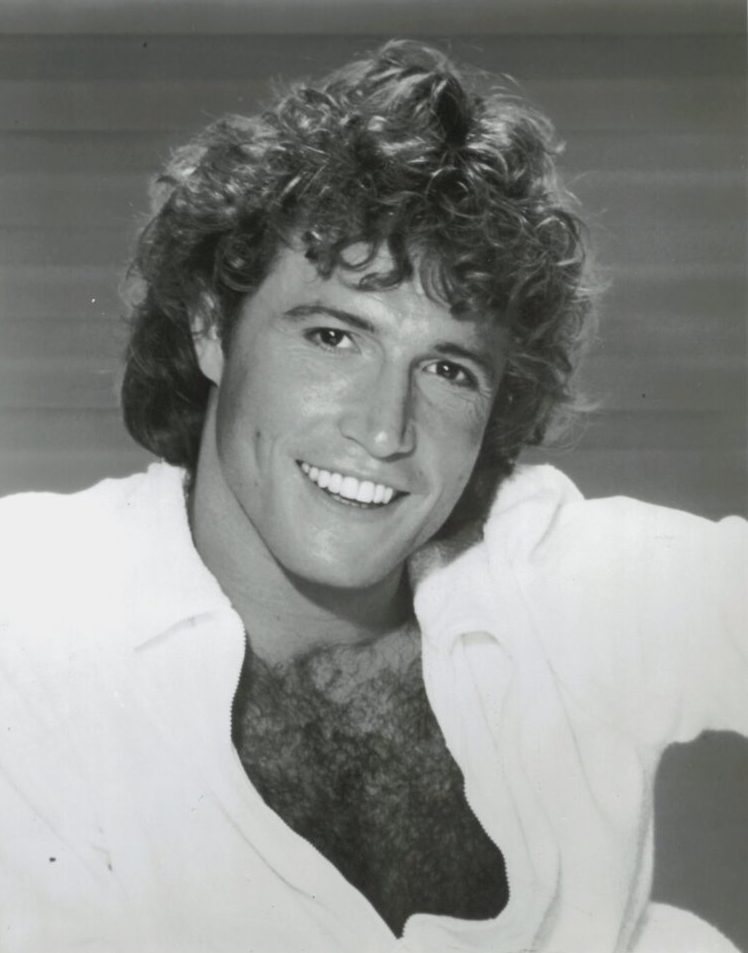
- Gibb in 1981
- Born: Andrew Roy Gibb; 5 March 1958; Stretford, Lancashire, England
- Died: 10 March 1988 (aged 30); Oxford, England
- Resting place: Forest Lawn Memorial Park, Los Angeles, California, US
- Occupations: Singer; musician; actor; television host
- Years active: 1973–1988
- Spouse: Kim Reeder (m. 1976; div. 1978)
- Children: 1
- Father: Hugh Gibb
- Relatives: Barry Gibb (brother); Robin Gibb (brother); Maurice Gibb (brother); Steve Gibb (nephew); Spencer Gibb (nephew)
- Musical career
- Origin: Redcliffe, Queensland, Australia
- Genres: Pop; rock
- Instruments: Vocals; guitar
- Labels: RSO; Polydor

Andrew Roy Gibb (5 March 1958 – 10 March 1988) was an English singer and musician. He rose to international fame in the late 1970s as a teen idol and pop star. The younger brother of Barry, Robin, and Maurice Gibb of the Bee Gees, Gibb achieved major success in close collaboration with his brothers. He was the first solo artist to have his first three singles reach number 1 on the US Billboard Hot 100.

Born in England and raised in Australia, Gibb began performing professionally in his teens before moving to the United States, where he signed with RSO Records. His debut album, Flowing Rivers (1977), produced three US number-one singles: "I Just Want to Be Your Everything", "(Love Is) Thicker Than Water", and "Shadow Dancing", the last of which also topped charts internationally and became his signature song. His subsequent albums, Shadow Dancing (1978) and After Dark (1980), further cemented his popularity.

In the early 1980s, Gibb expanded into theater and television, starring in productions of The Pirates of Penzance (1981) and Joseph and the Amazing Technicolor Dreamcoat (1982), and co-hosting the music show Solid Gold (1981–82). However, his career was disrupted by substance abuse and depression, leading to declining commercial success. In 1988, just days after his 30th birthday, Gibb died from myocarditis, exacerbated by years of drug use.

== Life and career ==
=== 1958–1975: Early life and first recordings ===
Andy Gibb was born on 5 March 1958 at Stretford Memorial Hospital, Stretford, Lancashire. He was the youngest of the five children born to Barbara and Hugh Gibb. His mother was of English and Irish descent, and his father was of Scottish and English descent. He had four siblings: his sister, Lesley; and three brothers—Barry and fraternal twins Robin and Maurice.

At the age of six months, Gibb immigrated with his family to Queensland, Australia. The family shared three different homes at Redcliffe, Queensland, north of Brisbane, before settling on Cribb Island, a former suburb of Brisbane, in January 1960. After moving several times between Brisbane and Sydney, Gibb returned to the United Kingdom in January 1967 as his three older brothers began to gain international fame as the Bee Gees.

In his childhood, his mother, Barbara, described Gibb as "A little devil, a little monster. I'd send him off to school, but he'd sneak off to the stable and sleep with his two horses all day. He'd wander back home around lunchtime smelling of horse manure, yet he'd swear he had been at school. Oh, he was a little monkey!" Producer and film director Tom Kennedy described Gibb's personality in his childhood:

Andy was always around—he was this cheeky little lad, Hugh and Barbara doted on him, so he would have a limo to go around London with his pals and twenty quid to go to the cinema. It was unheard of in those days! But he was just a cheeky little lad with a heart of gold. He used to try to get me to buy him beer when he was underage—he would only have been about 11 or 12.

Gibb dropped out of school at the age of 13, and with an acoustic guitar given to him by his older brother Barry, he began playing at tourist clubs around Ibiza, Spain (when his parents moved there), and later on the Isle of Man, his brothers' birthplace, where his parents were living at the time.

In August 1973, at the age of 15, Gibb made his first recordings at the Nova Sound Studios in London. The songs were "Windows of My World" and the country music number "My Father's a Rebel". The second song was written by Maurice Gibb (according to a November 1973 fan club newsletter) who also produced the session. In June 1974, Gibb formed his first group, Melody Fayre (named after a Bee Gees song), which included Isle of Man musicians John Alderson on guitar, Stan Hughes on bass, and John Stringer on drums. The group was managed by Gibb's mother, Barbara, and had regular bookings on the island's hotel circuit.

At the urging of his brother Barry, Gibb returned to Australia in 1974. Barry believed that since Australia had been a good training ground for the Bee Gees, it would also help Gibb's career. Lesley Gibb had remained in Australia, where she raised a family with her husband. Alderson and Stringer followed Gibb to Australia with the hope of forming a band there. With Col Joye producing, Gibb, Alderson, and Stringer recorded a number of Gibb's songs. The first was a demo called "To a Girl", with his brother Maurice playing organ, which he later performed on his television debut in Australia on The Ernie Sigley Show. Sigley later informed the audience that it was from Gibb's forthcoming album, but it was never released.

In November of the same year, he recorded six demos—again produced by Joye—including "Words and Music", "Westfield Mansions", and "Flowing Rivers" (which was later released). What may have detracted from the "training ground" aspect of Australia for Gibb compared with his brothers was that he was relatively comfortable financially, mainly due to his brothers' support and largesse; hence, the group's sporadic work rate. Gibb would disappear for periods of time, leaving Alderson and Stringer out of work with no income. Despondent, Alderson and Stringer returned to England.

Gibb later joined the band Zenta, consisting of Gibb on vocals, Rick Alford on guitar, Paddy Lelliot on bass, Glen Greenhalgh on vocals, and Trevor Norton on drums. Zenta supported international artists Sweet and the Bay City Rollers on the Sydney leg of their Australian tours. "Can't Stop Dancing" (a Ray Stevens song which was later a US hit for duo Captain and Tennille in May 1977) was pushed for release, but ultimately did not, although Gibb did perform it on television at least once on the revitalised Bandstand show hosted by Daryl Somers. Zenta would appear later as a backing band for Gibb, but did not participate on Gibb's recording sessions around 1975, which featured Australian jazz fusion group Crossfire.

"Words and Music" was released on the ATA label, only in Australia and New Zealand, owned by Col Joye, who also produced the Bee Gees' first singles in Australia. It was Gibb's first single and was backed by another composition "Westfield Mansions". The single would eventually reach No. 78 in Australia and No. 29 in New Zealand. Gibb performed this song on Countdown on 7 September 1975. While in Australia, Gibb recorded demos of his compositions as well as his own renditions of old numbers. When Gibb had got the call from his brother Barry in June 1976 that he and Col Joye's company ATA had proceeded with the new single ("Words and Music"), Gibb prepared to go to Florida later that year and had his last recording session before moving to the US, including "In the End", "Flowing Rivers", "Come Home for the Winter" and "Let It Be Me" which were later re-recorded in Criteria Studios.

=== 1976–1980: International success ===
Gibb at that time lived in Seven Hills, an outer Sydney suburb where he married his girlfriend Kim Reeder at the Wayside Chapel on 11 July 1976. "Kim breeds Staffordshire bull terriers and my sister does too", he once said. "We met at a dog show when my sister Lesley introduced us". In 1977, they moved to West Hollywood. Reeder recalled, "He became ensconced in the drug scene. Cocaine became his first love. He became depressed and paranoid." The couple separated and Reeder moved back to Australia, where she gave birth to their daughter, Peta, on 25 January 1978. Gibb and Reeder divorced later that year.

Robert Stigwood, who at the time was the Bee Gees' manager, signed Gibb to his label, RSO Records in early 1976, after he heard some of his demo tapes. Gibb soon moved to Miami Beach, to begin working on songs with his brother Barry and co-producers Albhy Galuten and Karl Richardson. In late 1976 in Miami, Gibb, with his brother Barry producing and recording in Criteria Studios, set about making his first album Flowing Rivers. Eagles guitarist Joe Walsh played on two songs on the album while recording Hotel California. On Gibb's compositions, the tracks were a mix of country music and ballads. After the release of Flowing Rivers, Gibb revealed:

I don't think you can pin any one thing on the way my voice and songwriting have developed. A lot of people say my album, Flowing Rivers, sounds like the Bee Gees, but if I sang or wrote any differently than I do now, it wouldn't be me at all. I was worried about my own material really, really badly. I didn't think I was a good songwriter at all. I was a bit doubtful about my own performance.

The first release from the album, and Gibb's first single released outside Australia, was "I Just Want to Be Your Everything" which was written by Barry, who also provided backup vocals. It reached No. 1 on the Billboard Hot 100 for three weeks, starting on the week ending 30 July 1977, and again for the week ending 17 September 1977. "I Just Want to be Your Everything" was Gibb's longest-running chart single on Billboard, Record World and Cashbox and was nominated for the Grammy Award for Best Pop Vocal Performance, Male at the 20th Grammy Awards. The song was later ranked No. 26 on Billboard's 55th anniversary All Time Top 100. Gibb later recalled Barry's writing style:

So, once we discussed it all and got the deal together, me and Barry locked ourselves in a bedroom and Barry just started writing. When Barry writes, it is very hard to collaborate with him, because he is so quick. And before I knew it he was starting to do the chorus of 'I Just Want to Be Your Everything', and I thought, 'Wow what a hook!'. He's an expert at his craft. Within about 20 minutes, he'd written a number one record; and then we went right into another one, '(Love Is) Thicker than Water'.

Eight of the ten tracks on the album were Gibb compositions, mostly written during his time in Australia. These included a re-recording of his previous single, "Words and Music". In September 1977 Flowing Rivers, with another No. 1 single "(Love Is) Thicker Than Water" (also co-written by Gibb and his brother Barry) to support it, quickly became a multi-million selling album. That single broke in early 1978 during the time that the Bee Gees' contributions to the Saturday Night Fever soundtrack were dominating the world charts. In the United States it replaced "Stayin' Alive" at the top of the Hot 100 on the day before Gibb's 20th birthday, only to be surpassed by "Night Fever" at No. 1 two weeks later. Both of the singles from Flowing Rivers were certified Gold by the Recording Industry Association of America (RIAA) for sales exceeding 500,000 units.

Gibb then began work with the Gibb-Galuten-Richardson production team on his second album, Shadow Dancing, which was released in April 1978 and was his highest-charting album in America (No. 7) and Canada (No. 1). The title track, written by all four Gibb brothers, was released as a single in the United States in April 1978. In mid-June it began a seven-week run at No. 1, achieving platinum status and the honour of being Billboard's No. 1 song of 1978. In the United States, Gibb became the first male solo artist to have three consecutive No. 1 singles on the Billboard Hot 100, with all of the weeks at the top of the chart happening in less than one year, from 30 July 1977 through 29 July 1978. Two further Top 10 singles, "An Everlasting Love" (No. 5) and "(Our Love) Don't Throw It All Away" (No. 9), were released from the album, which became another multi-million seller.

In 1979, Gibb performed along with the Bee Gees, ABBA and Olivia Newton-John (duet with "Rest Your Love on Me") at the Music for UNICEF Concert at the United Nations General Assembly, which was broadcast worldwide. He returned to the studio to begin recording sessions for his final full studio album After Dark. In March 1980, the last of Gibb's Top 10 singles charted just ahead of the album's release. "Desire" (No. 4) was recorded for the Bee Gees' 1979 album Spirits Having Flown and featured their original track, complete with Gibb's original "guest vocal" track. A second single, "I Can't Help It", a duet with family friend and fellow British and Australian expat Olivia Newton-John, reached the Top 20 (No. 12). In 1984, Gibb performed this song on the sitcom Punky Brewster in the episode "Play It Again, Punky" where Gibb guest starred as Punky's piano teacher.

Despite being certified Gold, the album's disappointing performance, coupled with Gibb's mounting drug problems, would lead to RSO Records dropping Gibb from its roster. Later in the year, Andy Gibb's Greatest Hits was released as a finale to his contract with RSO Records, with two new songs: "Time Is Time" (No. 15 in January 1981) and "Me (Without You)" (Gibb's last Top 40 chart entry) shipped as singles, before RSO founder Robert Stigwood let him go due to his cocaine addiction and behavioural problems. "After Dark" and "Will You Still Love Me Tomorrow" were non-single songs added to the album, the latter of which was a duet with P. P. Arnold, who had previously worked with Barry Gibb, including singing uncredited backups on "Bury Me Down by the River" from Cucumber Castle. Around the same time, Gibb was invited to sing the first verse on Queen's "Play the Game", and lead singer Freddie Mercury apparently was amazed by Gibb's abilities. According to some sources, the tape was found in 1990 in a search of Queen archives for bonus tracks for a CD but was not used. Since it has not been heard by any Queen collectors, its existence is somewhat doubtful, although record producer Mack has also confirmed that the version does exist.

=== 1981–1986: Decline and live performances ===
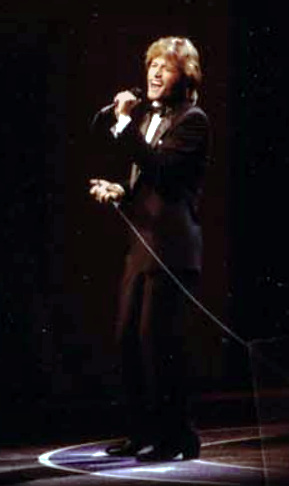
Gibb performing at Ford's Theatre Gala, 1981

While taping The John Davidson Show in January 1981, Gibb met actress Victoria Principal. During their high-profile relationship, Gibb began working on several projects outside the recording studio. He co-hosted the television music show Solid Gold from 1981 to 1982 with Marilyn McCoo. He also performed in Gilbert & Sullivan's The Pirates of Penzance (1981) in Los Angeles and Andrew Lloyd Webber's Joseph and the Amazing Technicolor Dreamcoat (1982) on Broadway. Gibb was ultimately fired from both Joseph and Solid Gold because of absenteeism caused by cocaine binges. Said Zev Buffman, a Broadway producer and financier for Joseph, "When Andy was at the theater, he was a joy. But he wasn't there enough", adding that of the five people to play Joseph up to that point, Gibb was the best actor.

He also said after Gibb's death, "We'd lose him over long weekends. He'd come back on Tuesday, and he'd look beat. He was like a little puppy—so ashamed when he did something wrong. He was all heart, but he didn't have enough muscle to carry through." An unnamed co-star in Joseph was quoted as saying, "I hear he spent most of his time in his hotel room in front of the TV. I guess he was frightened and insecure. That's what happens when you're the baby brother of the Bee Gees." Commenting after Gibb's death, Solid Gold producer Brad Lachman stated, "...[Andy] was a very charming, vulnerable and charismatic performer. He clearly meant well. He wasn't being difficult. He was going through problems he couldn't deal with. He wanted everyone to love him. He had so much going for him, and he just couldn't believe it."

In August 1981, Gibb and Principal released a duet of The Everly Brothers' "All I Have to Do Is Dream". This would be Gibb's last official single, and his last US chart entry, peaking at No. 51. Principal recalled after that, "Well, it became very apparent to me that his behavior was becoming erratic and that he was very, very thin. And Andy was a very kind person and a very gentle person, and some of his behavior seemed the antithesis of who I knew him to be. And over a period of ... deduction, I finally realized that it had to be drugs". Their romance ended shortly thereafter when she gave him an ultimatum to choose between her or drugs. After this, Gibb began dating actress Kari Michaelsen of the NBC television sitcom Gimme a Break!; Gibb met Michaelsen when he had guest starred on the series for one episode.

In 1984 and 1985, Gibb finished two successful contracts at the Riviera hotel in Las Vegas. His family convinced him to seek treatment for his drug addiction, which included a stay at the Betty Ford Center in 1985. It was during this time that Gibb began touring small venues with a stage show featuring his hits as well as covers. He also appeared in guest-starring roles on the television sitcoms Punky Brewster and Gimme a Break! Following an extensive tour of East Asia, he regularly performed shows in Las Vegas and Lake Tahoe. In 1984, he was the headline performer at the Viña del Mar Festival in Chile, performing two nights in a row. He also held a two-week engagement at San Francisco's historic Fairmont Hotel in March 1986.

=== 1987–1988: Attempted comeback and final days ===
In early 1987, Gibb went through another drug rehabilitation program and thought he had finally beaten his habits. He now aimed to get a recording contract for release of a new album in 1988. He returned to the studio in June 1987 recording four songs; one of them, "Man on Fire", was released posthumously in 1991 on a Polydor Records anthology. Another track, "Arrow Through the Heart", was the final song Gibb would record and was featured on an episode of VH1's series, Behind the Music and released on the Bee Gees' Mythology 4-disc box set in November 2010. The songs were co-written by Gibb with Barry and Maurice. Their demo recordings with engineer Scott Glasel were heard by Clive Banks from the English branch of Island Records. Gibb never formally signed a contract, but the record label planned to release a single in Europe that spring, followed by another single that summer with the album to follow. In this same year, Gibb filed a personal bankruptcy petition. In March 1988, Barry arranged for Island Records to sign Gibb, but when he arrived in England in January 1988, he panicked. Gibb missed meetings with the record company and blamed himself for his trouble writing songs; the deal was never signed.

== Death ==
By late January to early February in 1988, Gibb had seemingly beaten his drug addiction, regained his health, and was ready to begin recording a new album; however, he still suffered depression over his break-up with Victoria Principal. According to Robin Gibb, his brother "just went downhill so fast... he was in a terrible state of depression". During this period, Gibb slipped back into alcoholic habits, and was receiving phone calls from brothers Maurice and Barry in a last-ditch effort to get Gibb to stop. On 5 March 1988, Gibb celebrated his 30th birthday in London while working on the new album. Two days later, he entered John Radcliffe Hospital in Oxford complaining of chest pains.

At around 8:30 am on 10 March 1988, Gibb's doctor informed him more tests were needed to determine the cause of his chest pains. Shortly afterward, Gibb slumped into unconsciousness and died five days after his 30th birthday as a result of myocarditis, an inflammation of the heart muscle most likely caused by a virus. Years of cocaine use also weakened his heart. This diagnosis was supported by William Shell, a cardiologist who previously treated Gibb.

Upon the announcement of Gibb's death, his ex-wife, Kim Reeder, was not surprised. "I always knew that one day I'd get a call with news like this. It was only a matter of time." Gibb's family said the cause of death was not an overdose, as some media reports suggested, but natural causes after years of substance abuse.

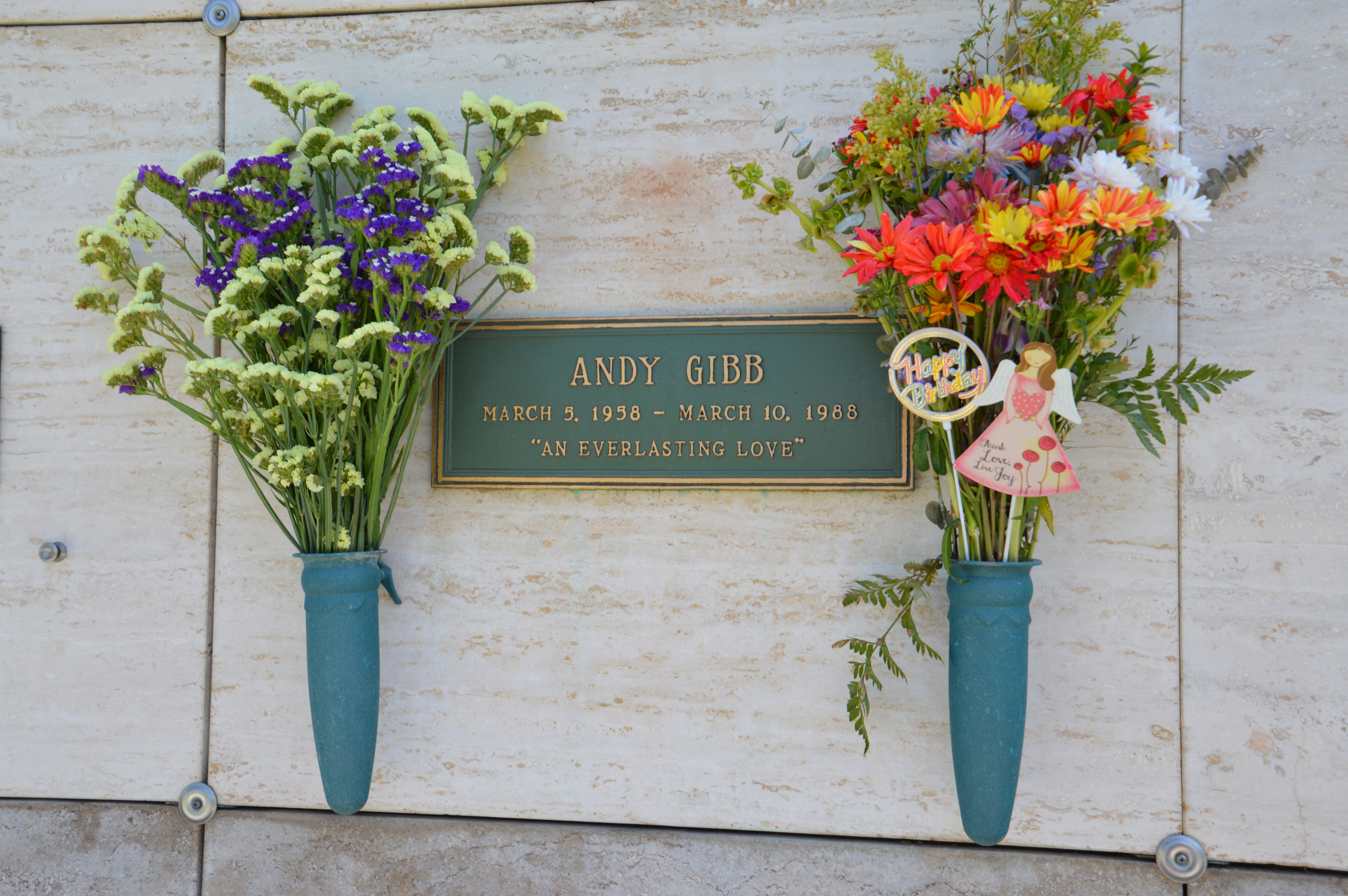
Gibb's headstone

Gibb's body was flown to the United States, where he was interred at Forest Lawn Memorial Park in Hollywood Hills, Los Angeles. The headstone reads "Andy Gibb / March 5, 1958 – March 10, 1988 / An Everlasting Love", after one of his hit singles.

== Legacy ==
The Andy Gibb Memorial Foundation contributes to charities that Gibb supported, such as the American Heart Association, the American Cancer Society, and the Diabetes Research Institute. The song "Wish You Were Here", which was a track on the Bee Gees 1989 album One, was dedicated by his brothers to Gibb.

== Awards and nominations ==
Gibb was nominated for two Grammy Awards at the 20th Annual Grammy Awards. He was also nominated for two American Music Awards.

=== Grammy Awards ===
Year	Nominee / work	Award	Result
1978	Andy Gibb	Best New Artist	Nominated
1978	"I Just Want to Be Your Everything"	Best Pop Vocal Performance, Male	Nominated

=== American Music Awards ===
Year	Nominee / work	Award	Result
1978	"I Just Want To Be Your Everything"	Favorite Pop/Rock Song	Nominated
1979	Andy Gibb	Favorite Pop/Rock Male Artist	Nominated

== Discography ==
=== Studio albums ===
Year	Album details	Peak chart positions						Certifications
Year	Album details	UK	AUS	CAN	NZ	US	US R&B	Certifications
1977	Flowing Rivers: First studio album; Release date: September 1977; Label: RSO Records	—	25	9	—	19	—	MC: Gold; RIAA: Platinum
1978	Shadow Dancing: Second studio album; Release date: June 1978; Label: RSO Records	15	28	1	15	7	18	BPI: Silver; MC: Platinum; RIAA: Platinum
1980	After Dark: Third studio album; Release date: February 1980; Label: RSO Records	—	65	24	—	21	67	RIAA: Gold
"—" denotes a recording that did not chart or was not released in that territory.

=== Compilations ===
Year	Album details	Peaks
Year	Album details	US
1980	Andy Gibb's Greatest Hits: Release date: 1980; Label: RSO Records	46
1991	Andy Gibb: Release date: 1991; Label: Polydor Records (reissued in 2012 by Reprise/Warner Bros.)	—
2001	20th Century Masters – The Millennium Collection: Release date: 14 August 2001; Label: Universal Music Enterprises	—
2010	Mythology (Disc 4 – Andy): Release date: November 2010; Label: Reprise/Warner Bros.	—
2018	The Very Best of Andy Gibb: Release date: April 2018; Label: Capitol Records	—
"—" denotes a recording that did not chart or was not released in that territory.

=== Singles ===
Year	Single	Peak chart positions								Certifications	B-side	Album
Year	Single	UK	AUS	CAN	IRE	NZ	US	US A/C	US R&B	Certifications	B-side	Album
1975	"Words and Music" (Note: "Words and Music" was only released as a single in the Australia and New Zealand)	—	78	—	—	—	—	—	—		"Westfield Mansions"	Non-album song
1977	"I Just Want to Be Your Everything"	26	1	1	—	2	1	8	19	MC: Gold; RIAA: Gold	"In the End"	Flowing Rivers
1977	"(Love Is) Thicker Than Water"	—	13	2	—	25	1	18	—	MC: Gold; RIAA: Gold	"Words and Music"	Flowing Rivers
1978	"Shadow Dancing"	42	11	1	—	5	1	8	11	MC: Platinum; RIAA: Platinum	"Let It Be Me"	Shadow Dancing
1978	"An Everlasting Love"	10	57	3	4	28	5	8	—	RIAA: Gold	"Flowing Rivers"	Shadow Dancing
1978	"(Our Love) Don't Throw It All Away"	32	61	8	21	27	9	2	—	RIAA: Gold	"One More Look at the Night"	Shadow Dancing
1978	"Why"	—	—	—	—	—	—	—	—		"One More Look at the Night"	Shadow Dancing
1980	"Desire"	—	90	10	—	38	4	9	49		"Waiting for You"	After Dark
1980	"I Can't Help It" (with Olivia Newton-John)	—	62	32	—	—	12	8	—		"Someone I Ain't"	After Dark
1980	"Rest Your Love on Me" (with Olivia Newton-John)	—	—	—	—	—	—	—	—		"Boats Against the Current"	After Dark
1980	"Time Is Time"	—	—	—	—	—	15	29	—		"I Go for You"	Andy Gibb's Greatest Hits
1981	"Me (Without You)"	—	—	—	—	—	40	45	—		"Melody"	Andy Gibb's Greatest Hits
1981	"All I Have to Do Is Dream" (with Victoria Principal)	—	—	39	—	—	51	25	—		"Good Feeling"	Non-album song
"—" denotes a recording that did not chart or was not released in that territory.

== Filmography ==
=== Television ===
Year	Title	Role
1983	Gimme a Break!	Himself
1984	Something's Afoot	Geoffrey
1985	Punky Brewster	Tony Glenn
