= I Just Want to Be Your Everything =

1977 single by Andy Gibb

Single by Andy Gibb

from the album Flowing Rivers
- B-side: "In the End"
- Released: April 1977
- Recorded: October 1976
- Studio: Criteria (Miami)
- Genre: Disco
- Length: 3:45 (album version); 3:34 (single version)
- Label: RSO
- Songwriter: Barry Gibb
- Producer: Gibb-Galuten-Richardson

Andy Gibb singles chronology
"Words and Music" (1975)	"I Just Want to Be Your Everything" (1977)	"(Love Is) Thicker Than Water" (1977)

Music video
- "I Just Want to Be Your Everything" on YouTube

"I Just Want to Be Your Everything" is a song recorded by Andy Gibb, initially released in April 1977 by RSO Records as the first single from his debut album Flowing Rivers (1977). The song was written by Gibb's older brother Barry, and produced by Gibb-Galuten-Richardson. It reached number 1 on the Billboard Hot 100 for four non-consecutive weeks, starting on the week ending 30 July 1977, and again for the week ending 17 September 1977. It was Gibb's first single released in the United Kingdom and United States. His previous single, "Words and Music" was only released in Australia. It is ranked number 26 on Billboard's 55th anniversary All Time Top 100.

== Writing and recording ==
"I Just Want to Be Your Everything" was written by Barry Gibb in Bermuda, as well as "(Love Is) Thicker Than Water" with Andy Gibb credited as co-writer on the latter. It was recorded in October 1976; the sessions were produced mainly by Albhy Galuten and Karl Richardson and with Barry on this track and "(Love Is) Thicker than Water"; Galuten also played keyboards and piano. Eagles guitarist Joe Walsh contributed guitar on this song. The track is a fairly dramatic love song, with the singer declaring his unending passion and stating that without her, he would die.

Andy reveals, "'I Just Want to Be Your Everything' was one of the most meaningful of all form, you know." He later recalls Barry Gibb's writing style:

"So, once we discussed it all and got the deal together, me and Barry locked ourselves in a bedroom and Barry just started writing. When Barry writes, it is very hard to collaborate with him, because he is so quick. And before I knew it he was starting to do the chorus of ['I Just Want to Be Your Everything'], and I thought, 'Wow what a hook!'. He's an expert at his craft. Within about 20 minutes, he'd written a number one record; and then we went right into another one, ['(Love Is) Thicker than Water'.]

Two mixes were prepared for the song; the more popular mix was released on the album and as the single version, while the earlier mix was used for promotional purposes. The promo version had an additional keyboard that at times competed with the lead vocal. The drummer's high-hat count during both breakdowns was completely mixed out and Gibb's harmony vocal is more prevalent during ad-libs.

== Release and chart success ==
In Billboard, the song spent a cumulative four weeks at No. 1 on the Hot 100 chart. The song first reached the top of the chart on July 30 for the first of three consecutive weeks. Then, The Emotions went to No. 1 with "Best of My Love" on August 20 for the first of four straight weeks, during which time Gibb's song remained in the top three. When the Emotions fell out of the #1 spot, "I Just Want to be your Everything" shot back to #1 for an additional week, on September 17. It was replaced once again by "Best of My Love", but would spend a record 16 weeks in the top 10. That record would be surpassed in early 1978, by his brothers, Barry, Robin, and Maurice Gibb, performing as The Bee Gees, when their song "How Deep is Your Love" spent 17 weeks in the top 10. On Billboard's Hot 100, "I Just Want to be your Everything" ultimately enjoyed a 31-week chart run spanning from the end of April through the end of November.

In Billboard's competitor magazine Cashbox, Gibb's hit stayed at #1 for three consecutive weeks, spent 12 weeks in the top 10, and 29 weeks on the Top 100.

Cash Box said that "a high-pitched, boyish voice is the vehicle for this happy love song." Record World said that "a sure pop touch should take this tune penned by brother Barry right up the charts."

On the Top Singles Chart of Record World (another Billboard competitor), "I Just Want to be your Everything" racked up a five-week stay at #1, which, like its four-week run on Billboard, was interrupted by The Emotions' "Best of My Love". On the Record World chart, Gibb hit #1 on August 6, stayed there on August 13, then yielded to The Emotions for two weeks, before returning to #1 for two additional weeks beginning on September 3. It had a record 15 weeks in Record World's top 10, from mid-July to late October, and spent of a total of 32 weeks in the top 100.

"I Just Want to be Your Everything" was Andy Gibb's longest-running chart single on Billboard, Record World, and Cashbox. In terms of year-end charts, they all ranked "I Just Want to be your Everything" as the #2 song of 1977, bested by Debby Boone's "You Light Up My Life" (in Cashbox and Record World) and by "Tonight's the Night" by Rod Stewart (in Billboard). Gibb's song also appeared on the Soul Singles chart, peaking at number 19 and was nominated for a Grammy Award for Best Pop Vocal Performance, Male at the 20th Grammy Awards. The song became a gold record.

== Personnel ==
- Andy Gibb — vocals
- Barry Gibb — background and harmony vocals
- Joe Walsh — electric guitar
- Paul Harris — keyboards
- Albhy Galuten — synthesizer
- Harold Cowart — bass
- Ron Ziegler — drums
- Nelson "Flaco" Padrón — percussion

== Charts ==
=== Weekly charts ===
Chart (1977–1978)	Peak position
Australia (Kent Music Report)	1
Brazilian Singles	1
Chile Singles	1
Canada Top Singles (RPM)	1
Canada Adult Contemporary (RPM)	11
Netherlands (Dutch Top 40)	24
Spain (PROMUSICAE)	13
New Zealand (Recorded Music NZ)	2
UK Singles (Official Charts Company)	26
US Billboard Hot 100	1
US Adult Contemporary (Billboard)	8
US Hot Soul Singles (Billboard)	19
US Cash Box Top 100	1
US Radio & Records	1
US Record World Singles	1

=== Year-end charts ===
Chart (1977)	Rank
Australia	3
Canada (RPM)	3
New Zealand	9
US Billboard Hot 100	2
US Easy Listening (Billboard)	21

=== All-time charts ===
Chart (1958–2018)	Position
US Billboard Hot 100	29

== Certifications ==
Region	Certification	Certified units/sales
New Zealand (RMNZ)	Gold	15,000^{‡}
^{‡} Sales+streaming figures based on certification alone.

== Connie Smith's version ==
"I Just Want to Be Your Everything"

Single by Connie Smith

from the album New Horizons
- Released: October 1977
- Recorded: 1977
- Genre: Country, Country pop
- Length: 3:16
- Label: Monument Records
- Songwriter: Barry Gibb

Connie Smith singles chronology
"Coming Around" (1977)	"I Just Want to Be Your Everything" (1977)	"Lovin' You Baby" (1978)

The best-known cover version of "I Just Want to Be Your Everything" was recorded by American country music artist Connie Smith. Released in the autumn of 1977, Smith's version, according to AMG reviewer Stephen Thomas Erlewine, was "relatively faithful" to Gibb's version and — given its disco-influenced sound — also a departure from her honky-tonk songs of the 1960s and early 1970s.

"I Just Want to Be Your Everything" peaked at #14 on Billboard Magazine's Hot Country Songs chart in 1978, becoming her last significant hit, as her further hits for Monument Records, such as "Lovin' You Baby" and "They'll Never Be Another for Me," peaked in progressively lower positions on the country chart between 1978 and 1979.

=== Charts ===
Chart (1978)	Peak position
Canada Country Tracks (RPM)	23
US Hot Country Singles (Billboard)	14
