= Johnne Sambataro =

American rock musician (born 1953)

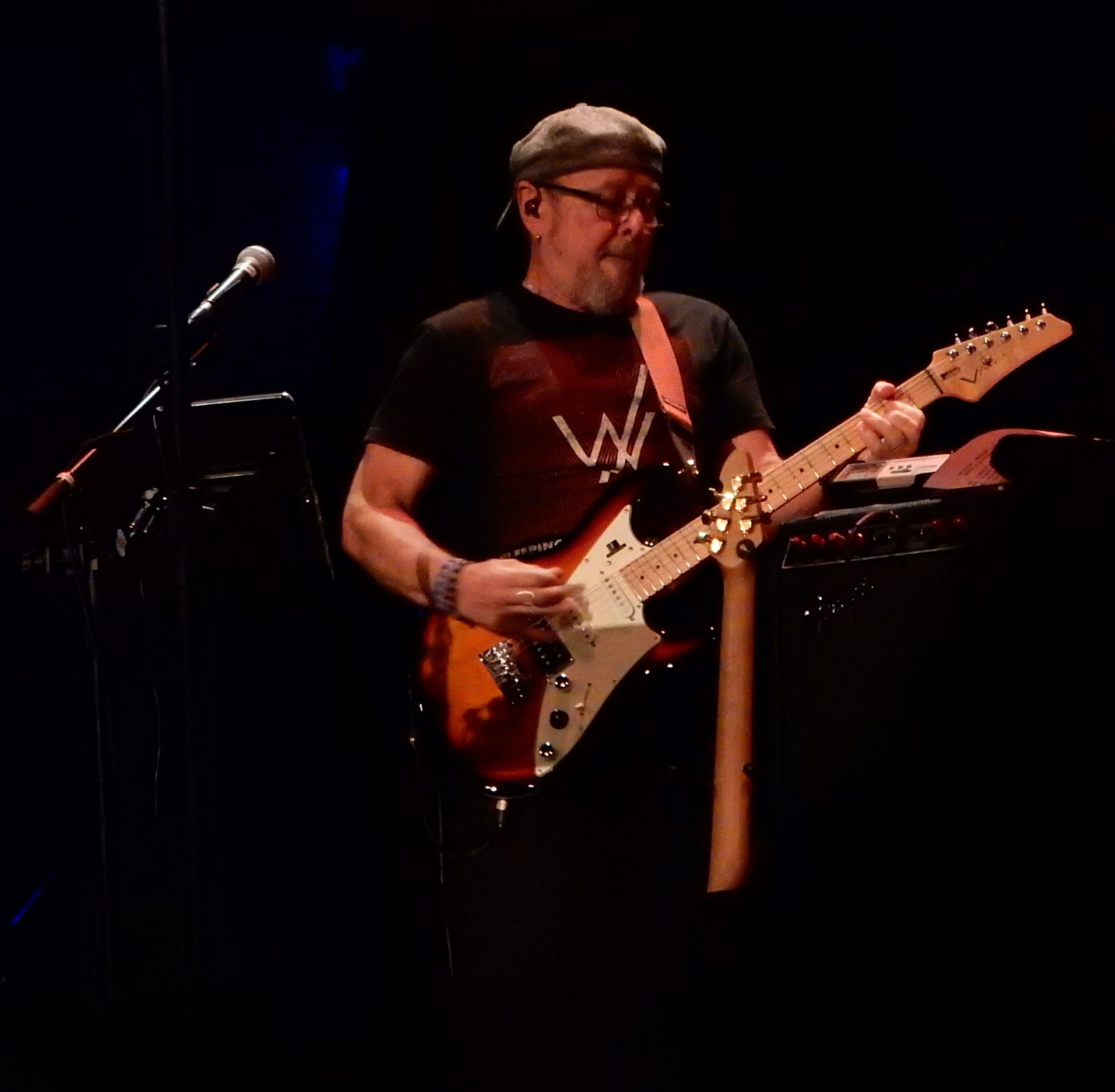
Johnne Sambataro

Johnne "John" Sambataro (born August 27, 1953, in South Florida) is an American rock musician. In 1975, he began working as a session vocalist and musician at Criteria Recording Studios in Miami, where he worked with Andy Gibb, Barry Gibb, Stephen Stills, Eric Clapton, Peter Frampton, Teri DeSario, Meat Loaf, John Parr, Coverdale and Page, Zakk Wylde and many others.

In 1978, he toured with Dave Mason. From 1979 through 1996, he toured with McGuinn, Clark & Hillman, Firefall and Dion. In 2001, he rejoined with Dave Mason for Mason's DVD Live at Sunrise, recorded at Sunrise Theater, and Sambataro continued to tour regularly with Mason until his retirement in 2025, and ultimately death in 2026.

In 2011, Sambataro recorded a solo album, Me, Myself & I.

Sambataro lives in South Florida with his wife Cathe and two sons, Jason and Jarrad, who are also musicians.
