= Flowing Rivers =

1977 studio album by Andy Gibb

Studio album by Andy Gibb
- Released: September 9, 1977
- Recorded: October 1976
- Studio: Criteria Studios (Miami)
- Genres: Pop rock; country
- Length: 38:07
- Label: RSO
- Producers: Albhy Galuten; Karl Richardson; Barry Gibb (executive producer)

Andy Gibb chronology
Flowing Rivers (1977)	Shadow Dancing (1978)

Singles from Flowing Rivers
- 1. "I Just Want to Be Your Everything" Released: April 1977; 2. "(Love Is) Thicker Than Water" Released: September 1977

Flowing Rivers is the debut studio album by the English singer-songwriter Andy Gibb, released in September 1977, by RSO Records. It was produced by Albhy Galuten and Karl Richardson, with Barry Gibb as executive producer. The album was re-released on CD by Polydor Records in 1998.

Two singles were released from the album, both of which peaked at number 1 on the Billboard Hot 100 chart: "I Just Want to Be Your Everything" and "(Love Is) Thicker Than Water".

== Background ==
In August 1973, at the age of 15, Gibb made his first recordings at the Nova Sound Studios in London. The songs are "Windows of My World" and the country number "My Father's a Rebel". The second song was written by Maurice Gibb (according to a November 1973 fans club newsletter) who also produced the session. At the urging of his brother, Barry, Gibb returned to Australia in 1974. Barry believed that since Australia had been a good training ground for the Bee Gees, it would also help Andy's career.

While in Australia, Gibb recorded demos of his compositions as well as his own renditions of old numbers. After the release of his first single, "Words and Music" he performed it on the Australian TV called The Ernie Sigley Show.

When Gibb had got the call from his brother Barry in June 1976 as he and Col Joye's company ATA had proceeded with the new single ("Words and Music") knowing that Gibb would go to Florida later that year, while his last recording session before moving to the US, including "In the End", "Flowing Rivers", "Come Home for the Winter" and "Let It Be Me" were re-recorded in Criteria.

== Recording ==
Gibb recorded an album of songs at Criteria around October 1976. He came to Miami in September and the sessions at Criteria are known to have coincided with the Eagles recording Hotel California, which they completed in October. Eagles member Joe Walsh plays on two tracks and Andy said that listening to some of the Eagles' songs influenced the sound he wanted on his album. The sessions were produced by Albhy Galuten and Karl Richardson, and with Barry on two songs, Galuten chose the experienced musicians who play on the album. The core group was Joey Murcia and Tim Renwick on guitar, Paul Harris and Galuten himself on piano and keyboards and Harold Cowart and Ron Ziegler on bass and drums. For some songs, they were joined by other top session players. Barry was very impressed with the polished sound of the session players. Barry was present to record only two songs ("I Just Want to Be Your Everything" and "(Love Is) Thicker Than Water") the two that he wrote for Andy, and although Andy said it ["Love Is (Thicker Than Water)"] was almost entirely Barry's work, it does sound a little closer to Andy's style.

On the album sessions, the title track was recorded for the third time. On Gibb's compositions, the tracks are a mix of country music and ballads.

== Release ==
The first Andy Gibb album was finally issued almost a year after it was recorded, carefully spaced between the Bee Gees releases. Andy wrote eight of the ten songs and Barry contributed to two. Andy was very suddenly very big in America, where both of the singles hit number 1. Unfortunately the ill effects of what Barry calls "first fame" had already claimed him by now. The title track was originally intended to be released by RSO as a single at the same time as "Love Is (Thicker Than Water)" but in favour of "Shadow Dancing" (later released on his next album), it was withdrawn.

After the release of Flowing Rivers, Andy revealed:

I don't think you can pin any one thing on the way my voice and songwriting have developed. A lot of people say my album, Flowing Rivers, sounds like the Bee Gees, but if I sang or wrote any differently than I do now, it wouldn't be me at all. I was worried about my own material really, really badly. I didn't think I was a good songwriter at all. I was a bit doubtful about my own performance.

== Critical reception ==
Professional ratings
Review scores
Source	Rating
AllMusic	3/5 stars

Amy Hanson of AllMusic wrote that although the album is "uneven and patchy in places", when it is "good, it's really good." She considered that both "I Just Want to Be Your Everything" and "(Love Is) Thicker than Water" were "perfect pop songs" that were "heavier on the guitars than on the disco". However, Hanson found that these songs did not "[gel] well with the rest". She concluded by describing the album as being "comprised of classic rock songs."

== Track listing ==
All tracks are written by Andy Gibb, except where noted.

Side one
No.	Title	Writer(s)	Length
1.	"I Just Want to Be Your Everything"	Barry Gibb	3:45
2.	"Words and Music"		4:38
3.	"Dance to the Light of the Morning"		3:19
4.	"Too Many Looks in Your Eyes"		4:10
5.	"Starlight"		3:32

Side two
No.	Title	Writer(s)	Length
1.	"(Love Is) Thicker Than Water"	B. Gibb; A. Gibb	4:15
2.	"Flowing Rivers"		3:37
3.	"Come Home for the Winter"		4:05
4.	"Let It Be Me"		3:30
5.	"In the End"		3:16
Total length:			38:07

== Personnel ==
Adapted from the album's liner notes.

Musicians

- Andy Gibb – lead vocals, backing vocals
- Barry Gibb – backing vocals (1, 6)
- John Sambataro – backing vocals (2–5, 7–10)
- Ron "Tubby" Ziegler – drums
- Harold "Hog" Cowart – bass guitar
- Joey Murcia – guitar
- George Terry – acoustic guitar, electric guitar
- Don Buzzard – steel guitar
- Nelson (Flaco) Pedron – percussion
- Paul Harris – piano
- Albhy Galuten – synthesizer
- Tim Renwick – guitar
- Joe Walsh – guitar
- Mike Lewis – conductor

Production

- Albhy Galuten – co-producer, string arrangements
- Karl Richardson – co-producer, engineer, mixing
- Barry Gibb – co-producer (1, 6), executive producer
- Steve Gersky – assistant engineer
- Bob Basso – string contractor
- Susan Herr – art direction
- Tom Nikosey – design, lettering
- Norman Seeff – photography
- John Kidder – ocean photograph

== Charts ==
=== Weekly charts ===
Chart (1977)	Peak position
Australian Kent Music Report Chart	25
Canadian RPM Albums Chart	9
Swedish Albums Chart	4
US Billboard 200	19

=== Year-end charts ===
Chart (1977)	Peak position
Canada Top Albums/CDs (RPM)	80
US Billboard 200	158
Chart (1978)	Peak position
Canada Top Albums/CDs (RPM)	50
Swedish Albums Chart	27
US Billboard 200	37
