= Shadow Dancing (song) =

Single by Andy Gibb

from the album Shadow Dancing
- B-side: "Let It Be Me" (US/CA); "Too Many Looks in Your Eyes" (EUR); "Fool for a Night" (Italy)
- Released: April 1978
- Recorded: December 1977/February 1978
- Studio: Criteria (Miami)
- Genre: Disco
- Length: 4:33 (album Version); 3:57 (single version); 6:07 (special disco version)
- Label: RSO Records
- Songwriters: Barry, Robin & Maurice Gibb, Andy Gibb
- Producer: Gibb-Galuten-Richardson

Andy Gibb singles chronology
"(Love Is) Thicker Than Water" (1977)	"Shadow Dancing" (1978)	"An Everlasting Love" (1978)

"Shadow Dancing" is a disco song performed by English singer-songwriter Andy Gibb. The song was released in April 1978 as the lead single by RSO Records from his second studio album of the same name. The song reached number one for seven consecutive weeks on the Billboard Hot 100 in 1978. It was written by Andy and his older brothers, Barry, Maurice and Robin Gibb and Albhy Galuten (who also produced this song) arranged the song with Barry Gibb. While Andy Gibb would have three more Top 10 hits in the U.S., this would be his final chart-topping hit in the United States. The song became a platinum record.

== Song development ==
The song was written by Andy and his brothers (Barry, Maurice and Robin Gibb) in Los Angeles, while the trio of brothers were working on the film Sgt. Pepper's Lonely Hearts Club Band. "And one night," Andy would recall, "while we were relaxing, we sat down and we had to start getting tracks together for the album" (also titled Shadow Dancing, which would eventually hit #7 on the U.S. album charts). "So we literally sat down and in ten minutes, we had a group going, (singing) the chorus part. As it says underneath the song, we all wrote it, the four of us."

== Release ==
According to Billboard's Book Of Number One Hits, Gibb became the first solo artist in the history of the U.S. pop charts to have his first three singles hit the number-one spot. It remained in the top spot for seven straight weeks from 17 June to 29 July 1978, keeping "Baker Street" by Gerry Rafferty from reaching the top spot. On 5 August it was replaced by The Rolling Stones with their hit "Miss You." Additionally, "Shadow Dancing" was listed by Billboard as being the number one single of 1978. The song peaked at number eleven on the soul chart and sold 2.5 million copies in the United States alone. Cash Box particularly praised the "solid arrangement of strings, horns, [and] disco-funk guitar work." Record World predicted that "this rather hushed dance record should be [Gibb's] third straight hit."

The single had three different B-sides. The US version's "Let It Be Me" and the European version's "Too Many Looks In Your Eyes" were both from Gibb's previous album Flowing Rivers, while the Italian release featured "Fool for a Night" from the Shadow Dancing album.

In July that year, Gibb performed "Shadow Dancing" at the Jai-Alai Fronton Studios in Miami, when Barry, Robin and Maurice unexpectedly joined him on stage, and sang this song with him. It was the first time that all four brothers performed together in concert.

== Personnel ==
- Andy Gibb — lead and background vocals
- Barry Gibb — background and harmony vocals, orchestral arrangement
- John Sambataro — background and harmony vocals
- Joey Murcia — electric guitar
- Tim Renwick — electric guitar
- Ron Zigler — drums
- George Bitzer — Fender Rhodes electric piano, Hohner clavinet
- Harold Cowart — bass
- Joe Lala — percussion
- Albhy Galuten — orchestral arrangement
- Peter Graves — horns
- Whit Sidener — horns
- Ken Faulk — horns
- Bill Purse — horns
- Neil Bonsanti — horns
- Stan Webb — horns

== Charts ==
=== Weekly charts ===
Charts (1978–1979)	Peak position
Australia (Kent Music Report)	11
Belgium (Ultratop 50)	22
Brazilian Singles Chart	1
Canada (RPM) Top Singles	1
Canada (RPM) Adult Contemporary	1
Germany (Media Control Charts)	44
New Zealand (Recorded Music NZ)	5
Norway (VG-lista)	4
Sweden (Sverigetopplistan)	8
UK Singles (Official Charts Company)	42
US Billboard Hot 100	1
US Billboard Easy Listening Charts	8
US Billboard Hot Soul Singles	11
US Cash Box Top 100	1
US Radio & Records	1
US Record World	1

=== Year-end charts ===
Chart (1978)	Rank
Australia (KMR)	60
Belgium (Ultratop 50)	30
Canada (RPM)	2
New Zealand	14
Norway (VG-lista)	10
Sweden (Sverigetopplistan)	17
US Billboard Hot 100	1
US Cash Box Top 100	3

=== All-time charts ===
Chart (1958–2018)	Position
US Billboard Hot 100	49

== Cover version ==
- Cornell Dupree covered "Shadow Dancing" in 1978.
- Ndugu & The Chocolate Jam Co. covered "Shadow Dancing" in 1980.
- "Shadow Dancing" was included on the album Hail Satin released in 2021 by the Dee Gees (an alter ego of the Foo Fighters). Lead vocals on this cover were sung by Taylor Hawkins.
