= (Love Is) Thicker Than Water =

Single by Andy Gibb

from the album Flowing Rivers
- B-side: "Words and Music" (US); "Flowing Rivers" (UK)
- Released: September 1977
- Recorded: October 1976
- Studio: Criteria (Miami)
- Genre: Pop; disco; soul
- Length: 3:23 (single version); 4:16 (album version)
- Label: RSO
- Songwriters: Barry Gibb, Andy Gibb
- Producer: Gibb-Galuten-Richardson

Andy Gibb singles chronology
"I Just Want to Be Your Everything" (1977)	"(Love Is) Thicker Than Water" (1977)	"Shadow Dancing" (1978)

"(Love Is) Thicker Than Water" is a song performed by Andy Gibb, released in September 1977 as the second and final single by RSO Records from his debut album, Flowing Rivers (1977). The song was his second single that topped the US Billboard Hot 100. It was mainly written by Barry Gibb, with help from Andy Gibb and produced by Gibb-Galuten-Richardson. The B-side of this song was "Words and Music" in the US, but "Flowing Rivers" in the UK. It became a gold record.

Billboard magazine describes the song as "a midtempo ballad that changes pace from a lushly romantic and soft [Andy] Gibb vocal to an uptempo instrumental drive. Plenty of melody and another catchy hook". Cash Box said that "the choral harmonies are full of pop appeal, while the arrangement adds a grandiose touch that will attract more progressive tastes."

== Writing and recording ==
"(Love Is) Thicker Than Water" was written by Barry Gibb in Bermuda with Andy Gibb credited as co-writer. Andy Gibb later revealed writing a song with Barry:

I did one song with Barry, 'Thicker Than Water' which I thought was good", Gibb explains, "Even though it says on the credits 'B. & A. Gibb', it is really Barry's song - it is very hard to write with Barry, but he said, 'Help me think of a great title'. That was a period where Barry was thinking of titles first and seeing how they would inspire him to write a song. I said, 'How about Thicker Than Water?' I did not say 'Love Is' just 'Thicker Than Water', he said 'That's great!' and then he came up with 'Love is higher than a mountain' and he just went on from there, but the title was totally my idea.

"(Love Is) Thicker than Water" was recorded in October 1976 at the Criteria Studios in Miami, Florida, during the same time as "I Just Want to Be Your Everything". On the two tracks, Joe Walsh of Eagles played guitar. The song was certified Gold in the United States on 16 February 1978 as Robert Stigwood presented Gibb with his first gold record at the Roxy in Los Angeles.

Billboard reviewed the song concluding that it has "plenty of melody and another catchy hook." Record World said that it "flows with a light touch and a clever chorus/hook."

== Aftermath ==
As evidence of the Gibb brothers' U.S. chart domination in 1978, atop the March 4, 1978 Hot 100 the Bee Gees' "Stayin' Alive" was displaced by this song, which in turn was displaced two weeks later by the Bee Gees' "Night Fever", which in turn was displaced eight weeks later by Yvonne Elliman's "If I Can't Have You". Since Barry Gibb had a hand in writing all four of these songs, he became the only person in history to write four consecutive US number-one singles, a feat unmatched to this day.

The song was released in February 1978 in Netherlands.

On October 7, 1977 Andy performed the song, and "I Just Want to Be Your Everything", on The Midnight Special.

== Charts ==
=== Weekly charts ===
Charts (1977–1978)	Peak position
Australia (Kent Music Report)	13
Canada Top Singles (RPM)	2
Canada (RPM) Adult Contemporary	1
New Zealand (Recorded Music NZ)	25
US Billboard Hot 100	1
US Billboard Easy Listening	18
US Cash Box Top 100	1
US Radio & Records	3
US Record World	1

=== Year-end charts ===
Chart (1978)	Rank
Australia (Kent Music Report)	88
Canada (RPM) Top Singles	11
US Billboard Hot 100	8
US Billboard Easy Listening	31
US Cash Box Top 100	50
