= Criteria Studios =

Recording studio in Miami, Florida, USA

Coordinates: 25.913245°N 80.163905°W

Criteria Recording Studios
- Type: Recording studio
- Industry: Music
- Founded: 1958; 68 years ago in Miami, Florida, U.S.
- Founder: Mack Emerman
- Headquarters: 1755 NE 149th St., Miami, Florida 33181, Miami, Florida, United States

Criteria Studios is a recording studio in North Miami, Florida, founded in 1958 by musician Mack Emerman. Hundreds of gold, platinum, and diamond singles and albums have been recorded, mixed or mastered at Criteria, for many notable artists and producers.

== Facilities ==
Criteria has seven studios, each with its own letter designation. Studio A is Criteria's largest live room, designed to be large enough to record a symphony orchestra, with a ceiling outline of 3,000 square feet and a Solid State Logic 9096 J console, multitrack tape decks, and a Pro Tools HD3 system. Studio B is a Pro Tools suite with a Solid State Logic AWS900. Studio C has a 20 x 30 foot live room with 19 foot high ceilings, and the 40-input vintage Neve 8078 mixing console formerly in Criteria's Studio A. Studio D has an SSL ORIGIN, the John Storyk-designed Studio E with its 27-foot peaked ceilings also houses an SSL9096J. Studio F is a digital production suite, featuring an SSL Duality console. Lastly, the Studio M7 production suite has a Slate RAVEN.

== History ==
=== Background ===
In 1950, musician Mack Emerman, a former trumpet player with the Les Brown-led Duke Ambassadors, relocated to Hollywood, Florida and began recording on location and in his parents' home for release on his own short-lived Criteria Gold Coast jazz label. Emerman eventually acquired property at the corner of 149th Street and West Dixie Highway in North Miami to build the original 30 foot by 60 foot building designed by architect Charles C. Reed Jr. that would open in 1958 as the Criteria Recording Studio. Emerman enlisted the help of Grover 'Jeep' Harned, owner of a local hi-fi shop, to troubleshoot and rebuild Criteria's first mixing console, which had been custom-built by the chief engineer at the nearby local NBC affiliate WCKT. Harned would go on to found MCI, whose success as a recording console and multi-track recorder manufacturer would be closely tied to Criteria Studios' success.

=== 1958–1969: Early years ===
Criteria's early sessions included jazz bands, commercial work, and small film work. When production for CBS The Jackie Gleason Show moved to Miami Beach in the early 1960s, Criteria Studios was hired to produce the show's music. Criteria expanded in 1965, building Studio A with a live room large enough to record a 72-piece orchestra, still Criteria's largest live room today. The same year, King Records owner Syd Nathan visited the studios with James Brown, and was so impressed by the sound of the studio's 8-channel custom recording console (cutting-edge technology at the time) that he booked an October recording session, during which Brown recorded his hit song "I Got You (I Feel Good)". The Albert Brothers (Ron and Howard) established themselves as a production duo at Criteria in the late 1960s with their signature "Fat Albert" drum sound. In 1969, Brook Benton recorded his hit song "Rainy Night in Georgia" with Atlantic Records producer Arif Mardin. Wilson Pickett and Betty Wright were also among the artists to record at Criteria in its early days.

=== 1970–1975: "Atlantic South" ===
In the 1970s, Atlantic Records' executive Jerry Wexler, producer Arif Mardin, and staff engineer-producer Tom Dowd utilized Criteria Studios for numerous Atlantic projects, earning the Miami studio the nickname "Atlantic Studios South". Wexler hired a group of Memphis musicians, the Dixie Flyers, to become Atlantic's studio band in Miami. After encouragement from Atlantic executive Ahmet Ertegun, Stephen Stills first recorded with the Albert Brothers at Criteria in 1971, beginning a relationship that would continue through the '70s. Criteria expanded in 1972 with the addition of Studio C (a 20 x 30 foot room with 19 foot high ceilings) and Studio D. The same year, Aretha Franklin recorded 5 tracks of her Grammy Award-winning album Young, Gifted and Black at the studio.

The Allman Brothers Band recorded Idlewild South with Dowd at Criteria, leading to Duane Allman playing with Eric Clapton on all but 3 tracks of Layla and Other Assorted Love Songs. The Allman Brothers Band returned to Criteria to record tracks that would be released on Eat a Peach, and Clapton took up residence at 461 Ocean Boulevard in Golden Beach, Florida to record his 1974 solo album by the same name at Criteria. Clapton and his manager Robert Stigwood later suggested to RSO label mates the Bee Gees that relocating to the house to record at Criteria may similarly benefit from a change of scene.

In 1973, Todd Rundgren produced Grand Funk Railroad's recording of We're an American Band at Criteria, and The Average White Band recorded AWB with Arif Mardin at the studio the following year. In 1975, producer-engineer Bill Szymczyk recorded Elvin Bishop's "Fooled Around and Fell in Love" with Mickey Thomas on vocals at Criteria, and returned to the studio the following year with the Eagles to record half of their 1976 album Hotel California (Eagles album) in Studio C. At the same time the Eagles were recording Hotel California, Black Sabbath was recording Technical Ecstasy. Geezer Butler recalls, "Before we could start recording we had to scrape all the cocaine out of the mixing board", Geezer divulged to Uncut in 2014. "I think they'd left about a pound of cocaine in the board." The Eagles were forced to stop recording on numerous occasions because Sabbath were too loud and the sound was coming through the wall.[8] Fleetwood Mac recorded parts of Rumours in Studio C, and Crosby, Stills, & Nash recorded parts of their album, CSN, with the Albert Brothers at the studio.

=== 1975–1979: Bee Gees ===
In 1975, on the advice of Eric Clapton and Robert Stigwood, the Bee Gees rented 461 Ocean Boulevard in Miami to again record with Arif Mardin, this time at Criteria Studios. Working with Criteria's Karl Richardson, Main Course marked a change of direction that would become the template for numerous successful projects at the studio for the remainder of the decade. The Bee Gees' next album Children of the World and its hit single, "You Should Be Dancing", was the first to feature the Gibb-Galuten-Richardson production team consisting of Barry Gibb, Albhy Galuten, and Criteria's Karl Richardson. The combination of Galuten, Richardson, and one or all of the Gibb brothers would become responsible for a record-breaking string of hit recordings produced at Criteria, including several songs on the chart-topping Saturday Night Fever soundtrack album, Andy Gibb's Flowing Rivers (1977) and Shadow Dancing (1978), and the Frankie Valli title song "Grease" from the musical motion picture of the same name, culminating in six songs topping the Billboard Hot 100 in the first six months of 1978, breaking records previously set by the Beatles. At the time, Criteria was Florida's largest independent studio facility.

The Bee Gees recorded at Criteria again for their 1979 album, Spirits Having Flown, and utilized the studio for successful production and/or songwriting collaborations following 1979's disco backlash, including Barbra Streisand's Guilty, and Dionne Warwick's Heartbreaker.

In 1978 and 1979, Criteria was utilized by Ted Nugent, AC/DC during the recording of Highway to Hell, and Bob Seger for 3 tracks from Against the Wind. Emerman and Dowd began planning an additional John Storyk-designed studio complex in Southern California at the former Walter Lantz Animation Studios, which was going to be called Criteria West, but in light of a drop in demand and rising interest rates, plans for a west coast location were abandoned. Grayson Hugh's self-titled, first studio album was mixed here in 1979 by Ron Scalise.

=== 1980–1998: Changing times ===
In 1981, Criteria utilized John Storyk's design expertise to expand the original location, adding Studio E, a large space with 27-foot peaked ceilings, decorated with Cuban tile, stained glass, and even a waterfall. Studio E was outfitted with a custom 56-channel MCI console and twin 24-track machines. It was in the brand-new Studio E that Criteria staff producer-engineer Don Gehman helped John Mellencamp record "Jack & Diane" during the sessions for his 1981 commercial breakthrough album, American Fool. The following year, Bow Wow Wow recorded "I Want Candy" at Criteria, and The Romantics recorded their 1983 album, In Heat at the studio. In 1984, Criteria was the first studio in the southeastern US to install a Solid State Logic mixing console.

In 1987, Gloria Estefan and Miami Sound Machine recorded what would become their most commercially successful album, Let It Loose, at Criteria. Estefan would return to the studio two years later to record her debut solo album, Cuts Both Ways. But Criteria Studios struggled to balance its debt with the 1980s music industry slowdown, and Emerman ended up selling Criteria to Joel Levy in 1991. In 1993, Marilyn Manson recorded their debut studio album, Portrait of an American Family, at Criteria. Other artists recording at the studios in the 1990s included David Coverdale and Jimmy Page, 2 Live Crew, Noreaga, Malevolent Creation and Julio Iglesias.

=== 1999–2012: The Hit Factory Criteria Miami ===
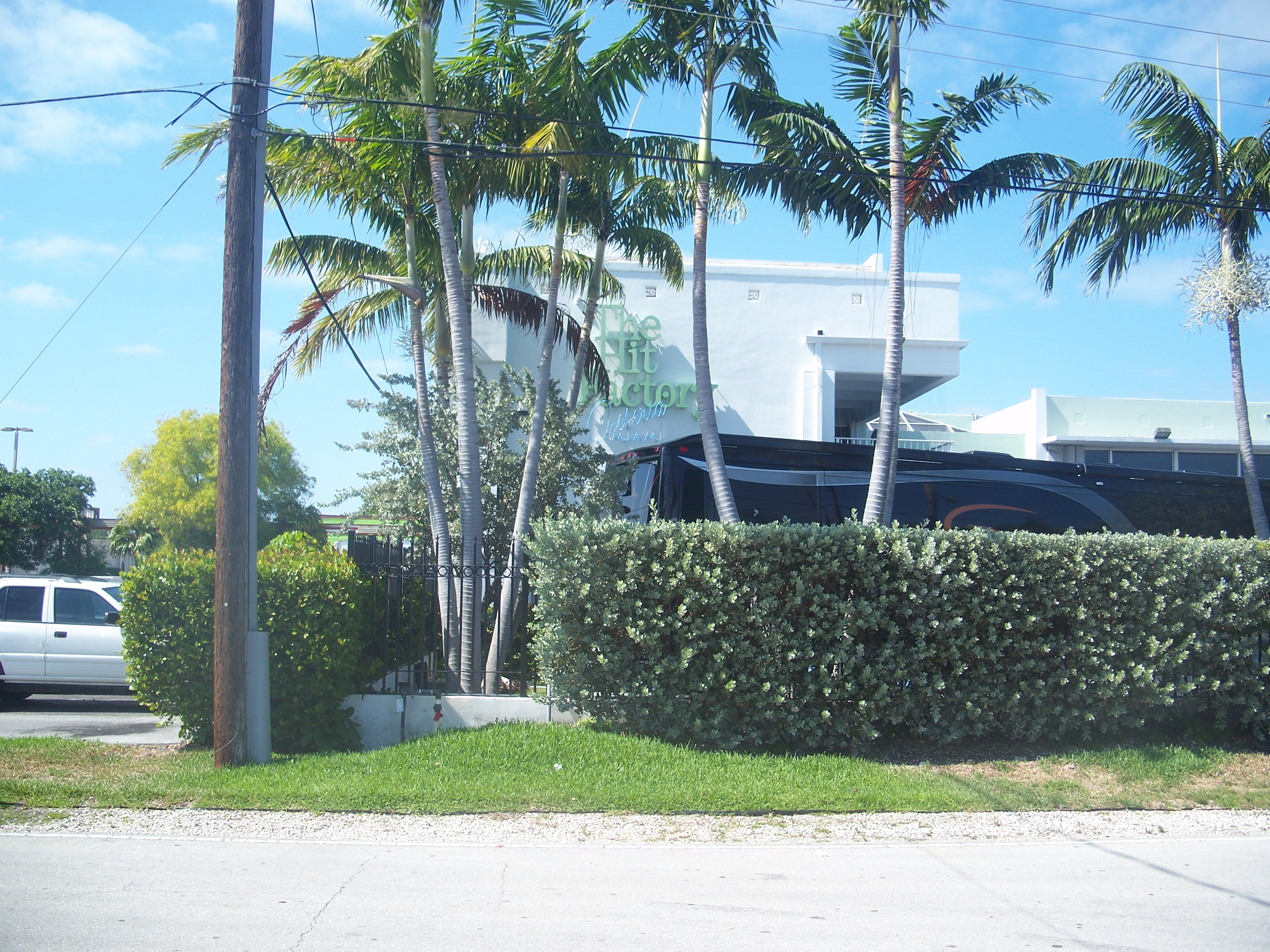
Criteria Studios in 2011

In 1999, in an effort to tap into the growing popularity of Latin music, The Hit Factory purchased Criteria Studios and, after 9 months of extensive remodeling and rebuilding all of its five existing studios, as well as the addition of a sixth studio space, Studio F, re-opened the studios under the new name "The Hit Factory Criteria Miami". In 2003, Monica recorded her hit song "So Gone" at Hit Factory Criteria, and the following year, CeeLo Green recorded Cee-Lo Green... Is the Soul Machine at the studio. Maná recorded their 2006 album Amar es Combatir at Criteria Other artists recording at the studio in the 2000s included Jennifer Lopez, Shakira, Alicia Keys, Cliff Richard, and Nelly Furtado.

In 2005, Lil Wayne relocated to Miami and established semi-residency at Hit Factory Criteria, doing production work on numerous projects for various artists and recording his own material at the studios, including his 2008 commercial breakthrough Tha Carter III.

In 2017, the facility once again reverted to the original Criteria Studios name.

== Selected artists ==
Artists who have recorded singles or albums at the studio include:

- 2 Live Crew
- 10,000 Maniacs
- ABBA
- AC/DC
- Adele
- Aerosmith
- AGNEZ MO
- Air Miami
- Alejandro Sanz
- Alicia Keys
- The Allman Brothers Band
- Andy Gibb
- Aretha Franklin
- Asha Puthli
- Austin Mahone
- The Baskerville Hounds
- Bee Gees
- Beach Boys
- The Bellamy Brothers
- Bertín Osborne
- Betty Wright
- Billy Joel
- Black Sabbath
- Bob Dylan
- Bob Marley
- Bob Seger
- Bootsy Collins
- Bow Wow Wow
- Brandy
- Brook Benton
- Buddy Guy
- Candy
- Cardi B
- CeeLo Green
- Charred Walls of the Damned
- Chicago
- Christina Aguilera
- Collective Soul
- Comateens
- Creed
- Cristian Castro
- Crosby, Stills and Nash
- Daddy Yankee
- Daliah Lavi
- Damon Albarn
- David Bowie
- Delaney & Bonnie
- Derek and the Dominos
- Donny Hathaway
- Don Johnson
- Drake
- Dr. Dre
- Dr. John
- Duane Allman
- Eagles
- Eddie Money
- Elvin Bishop
- Enrique Iglesias
- Eric Clapton
- Exposé
- Fleetwood Mac
- Firefall
- Game
- Gang of Four
- Gloria Estefan
- Godsmack
- Grand Funk Railroad
- High Point University Chamber Singers
- Ivano Fossati
- Jackie Gleason
- Jaco Pastorius
- James Brown
- Jay-Z
- Jennifer Lopez
- Jimmy Buffett
- Joe Cocker
- Joe Vitale
- John Cougar Mellencamp
- John Denver
- John Lee Hooker
- Julio Iglesias
- Justin Bieber
- Lali (Soy)
- Leaves of Grass
- Lenny Kravitz
- Less Than Jake
- Lil Wayne
- Lulu
- Lynyrd Skynyrd
- Maná
- Manassas
- Manowar
- Mariah Carey
- Marilyn Manson
- Meat Loaf
- Mink DeVille
- Michael Jackson
- Mickey Thomas
- Monica
- Nelly Furtado
- Nicki Minaj
- The Nails
- N.O.R.E.
- Ozuna
- Pat Martino
- Petula Clark
- Phyllis Hyman
- PISO 21
- Ral Donner
- R.E.M.
- REO Speedwagon
- R. Kelly
- Riggs
- The Rock-afire Explosion
- Rod Stewart
- Ronnie Hawkins
- The Mothers of Invention
- The Romantics
- Sam Samudio
- Soda Stereo
- Shakira
- Six Feet Under
- Stephen Stills
- Vida Blue
- Will to Power
- Wilson Pickett
- Wishbone Ash
- Wisin & Yandel
- Yngwie Malmsteen

== See also ==
- The Hit Factory
- The Albert Brothers
- Music Center Incorporated
