= Albhy Galuten =

American songwriter (born 1947)

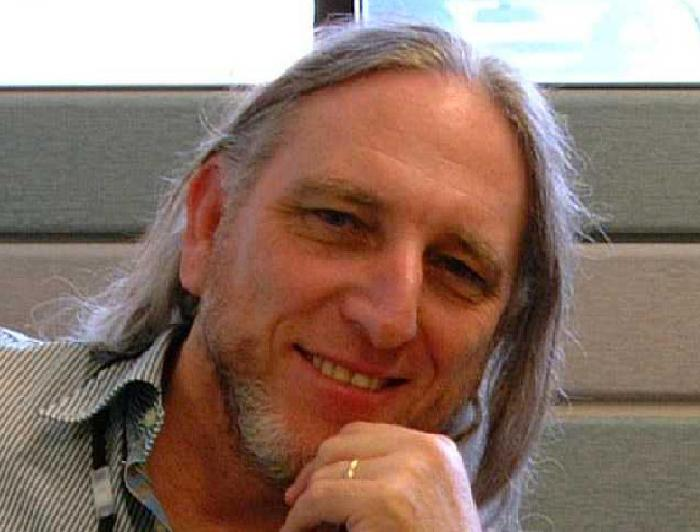
- Galuten in 2003

Background information
- Born: Alan Bruce Galuten; December 27, 1947 (age 78); Hartsdale, New York, U.S.
- Occupations: Record producer; composer; musician; orchestrator; songwriter; technology executive
- Instruments: Piano; keyboards; synthesizer; guitar

Albhy Galuten (born Alan Bruce Galuten; December 27, 1947) is an American technology executive and futurist, Grammy Award-winning record producer, composer, musician, orchestrator and conductor.

== Career ==
=== Musical career ===
Galuten attended Berklee College of Music.

Galuten's record productions include the soundtrack Saturday Night Fever, the theme song "Grease," the Eric Clapton recording of "Knockin on Heaven's Door" and albums for Jellyfish, Olivia Newton-John, Barbra Streisand (Guilty), Dionne Warwick (Heartbreaker), Andy Gibb, Kenny Rogers and Dolly Parton, Samantha Sang, Diana Ross, Eric Clapton, Jesse Ed Davis, Titanic Love Affair and the Bee Gees. He also formed a production team with Barry Gibb and Karl Richardson under the name Gibb-Galuten-Richardson.

Galuten also contributed playing or orchestration skills to recording artists Wishbone Ash, Bill Wyman, Eric Clapton, Rod Stewart, Aretha Franklin, Eagles, Kenny Loggins, Petula Clark and No Doubt. He is also credited with playing the first synthesizer in reggae.

His U.S. number one singles include "You Should Be Dancing," "How Deep Is Your Love," "Stayin' Alive," "Night Fever," "Too Much Heaven," "Tragedy," and "Love You Inside Out" by the Bee Gees; "I Just Want to Be Your Everything," "(Love Is) Thicker Than Water," and "Shadow Dancing" by Andy Gibb; "Grease" by Frankie Valli; "Woman in Love" by Barbra Streisand; and "Islands in the Stream" by Kenny Rogers with Dolly Parton.

Other hit singles include "Knockin’ on Heaven’s Door" (Eric Clapton), "Love So Right" (Bee Gees), Guilty (Barbra Streisand), "What Kind of Fool" (Barbra Streisand), "Emotion" (Samantha Sang), "I Can't Help It" (Olivia Newton-John & Andy Gibb), "Heartbreaker" (Dionne Warwick), "Chain Reaction" (Diana Ross), "Eaten Alive" (Diana Ross), "Eyes That See In the Dark" (Kenny Rogers)

=== Technology executive ===
He is a founder at Agora Media and a senior fellow, technology initiatives at Intertrust Technologies. He is a vice president at Sony and a Senior Vice President at Universal Music Group and a vice president at Ion. Galuten filed patents, developed corporate technology strategy, negotiated technology deals and worked in the development of standards including the Content Reference Forum (chairman) and the Coral Consortium (Vice President).

=== Inventor ===
As an inventor, Galuten is noted for having created the first commercial drum loop ("Stayin' Alive", Bee Gees), the Enhanced CD, and has numerous patents in the areas of content distribution and resolution, customer care, user interface design, emotion-based algorithmic music generation, and media aggregation and optimization. His issued patents cover innovations in error handling, media navigation, customer support, and algorithmic music generation.

== See also ==
- Islands in the Stream (song)
- Blue Book (CD standard)
- Jellyfish (band)
