= Yvonne Elliman discography =

- Studio albums: 6
- EPs: 1
- Compilation albums: 7
- Singles: 22

This is the discography of American singer Yvonne Elliman.

== Albums ==
=== Studio albums ===
Title	Album details	Peak chart positions		
Title	Album details	US	AUS	CAN
Yvonne Elliman	Released: April 1972; Label: Decca, Polydor; Released in the UK as I Don't Know How to Love Him	—	—	—
Food of Love	Released: August 1973; Label: MCA, Purple	—	—	—
Rising Sun	Released: May 1975; Label: RSO	—	—	—
Love Me	Released: February 1977; Label: RSO	68	—	—
Night Flight	Released: February 1978; Label: RSO	40	88	39
Yvonne	Released: October 1979; Label: RSO	174	—	—
Simple Needs	Released: 2004; Label: EboRhythm	—	—	—
"—" denotes releases that did not chart or were not released in that territory.

=== Compilation albums ===
Title	Album details
The Very Best of Yvonne Elliman	Released: March 1, 1995; Label: Taragon
The Best of Yvonne Elliman	Released: 1995; Label: Polydor; Contains the entirety of the Love Me album
Master Series	Released: 1996; Label: PolyGram; UK-only release
The Best of Yvonne Elliman	Released: April 22, 1997; Label: Polydor
If I Can't Have You	Released: March 1999; Label: PSM/PolyGram
The Collection	Released: August 1999; Label: Spectrum Music; UK-only release
The Best of Yvonne Elliman	Released: July 2004; Label: Polydor

== EPs ==
Title	Album details
Simple Needs	Released: 2004; Label: EboRhythm

== Singles ==
Title	Year	Peak chart positions										Album
Title	Year	US	US AC	AUS	BEL (FL)	CAN	CAN AC	IRE	NL	NZ	UK	Album
"I Don't Know How to Love Him"	1971	28	15	72	—	20	—	—	—	—	47	Jesus Christ Superstar
"Everything's Alright"	1971	92	25	100	—	—	—	—	—	—	—	Jesus Christ Superstar
"Can't Find My Way Home"	1972	—	—	—	—	—	—	—	—	—	—	Yvonne Elliman
"Nothing Rhymed"	1972	—	—	—	—	—	—	—	—	—	—	Yvonne Elliman
"What a Line to Go Out On" (UK-only release)	1972	—	—	—	—	—	—	—	—	—	—	I Don't Know How to Love Him
"Could We Start Again Please?" (with Michael Jason)	1972	—	—	—	—	—	—	—	—	—	—	Jesus Christ Superstar – Original Broadway Cast
"I Can't Explain"	1973	—	—	—	—	—	—	—	—	—	—	Food of Love
"Come On Back Where You Belong"	1974	—	—	—	—	—	—	—	—	—	—	Non-album single (Note: From the 1974 film The Midnight Man)
"From the Inside"	1975	—	—	—	—	—	—	—	—	—	—	Rising Sun
"Somewhere in the Night"	1975	—	—	—	—	—	—	—	—	—	—	Rising Sun
"The Best of My Love" (Netherlands-only release)	1975	—	—	—	—	—	—	—	—	—	—	Rising Sun
"Walk Right In"	1975	109	—	—	—	—	—	—	—	—	—	Rising Sun
"Love Me"	1976	14	5	15	30	11	3	9	16	3	6	Love Me
"Hello Stranger"	1977	15	1	—	—	13	1	—	20	12	26	Love Me
"I Can't Get You Outa My Mind"	1977	—	19	—	—	—	11	—	—	—	17	Love Me
"If I Can't Have You"	1977	1	9	9	24	1	2	20	31	6	4	Saturday Night Fever
"Savannah"	1978	—	—	—	—	—	—	—	—	—	—	Yvonne
"Lady of the Silver Spoon" (Australia-only release)	1978	—	—	—	—	—	—	—	—	—	—	Night Flight
"Moment by Moment"	1978	59	32	—	—	—	18	—	—	—	—	Moment by Moment
"Love Pains"	1979	34	33	—	13	—	—	—	22	—	—	Yvonne
"Your Precious Love" (with Stephen Bishop)	1980	105	—	—	—	—	—	—	—	—	—	Roadie
"If I Can't Have You" (with David Levy)	2015	—	—	—	—	—	—	—	—	—	—	Non-album single
"—" denotes releases that did not chart or were not released in that territory.

== Contributions ==
Year	Title	Artist	Contribution
1970	Jesus Christ Superstar	Various	Vocals
1971	Jesus Christ Superstar – Original Broadway Cast	Various	Vocals
1971	Gemini Suite	Jon Lord	Vocals on "Vocals"
1973	Jesus Christ Superstar – The Original Motion Picture Sound Track Album	Various	Vocals
1974	461 Ocean Boulevard	Eric Clapton	Vocals on six tracks, guitar on "Please Be with Me" and co-wrote "Get Ready"
1975	There's One in Every Crowd	Eric Clapton	Vocals
1975	E. C. Was Here	Eric Clapton	Vocals
1976	No Reason to Cry	Eric Clapton	Vocals
1977	Let It Flow	Dave Mason	Vocals on "Seasons"
1977	Slowhand	Eric Clapton	Vocals
1978	Rings Around the Moon	Carillo	Vocals
1981	Stand in the Light	Henry Kapono	Vocals
1982	No More Illusions	Jim Mandell	Vocals
1982	Here I Am	Norman Saleet	Vocals
1983	WarGames	Arthur B. Rubinstein	Vocals on three tracks
1984	On Whistle Test	Eric Clapton	Vocals (Video album recorded live in 1977)
1996	Crossroads 2: Live in the Seventies	Eric Clapton	Vocals (Box set of live recordings from the 1970s)
2014	Rock Opera	Ted Neeley	Vocals on "Up Where We Belong"
