= The Collection (Martine McCutcheon album) =

The Collection is a compilation album by the English singer Martine McCutcheon, released in 2012.

== Track listing ==
Disc 1

1. "Perfect Moment"
2. "I Dreamed a Dream"
3. "The Winner Takes It All"
4. "Talking in Your Sleep"
5. "Never Lose Your Faith In Love"
6. "I'm Over You"
7. "What You See Is What You Get"
8. "On the Radio"
9. "Wishing"
10. "Together We Are Beautiful"
11. "Don't Rain on My Parade"
12. "Zing! Went the Strings of My Heart"
13. "The Lady Is A Tramp"
14. "The Man That Got Away"
15. "Can You Feel The Love Tonight"
16. "Out Here On My Own"

Disc 2

1. "Everybody"
2. "Tonight"
3. "Teardrops"
4. "Rainy Days"
5. "Secret Garden"
6. "Hold Me Tighter In The Rain"
7. "I've Got You"
8. "Gettin' Ready for Love"
9. "Maybe This Time"
10. "There Are Worse Things I Could Do"
11. "Wishing You Were Somehow Here Again"
12. "You, Me And Us"
13. "Mamma Mia"
14. "Rainy Days (Sleaze Sisters Anthem Mix)"
15. "I'm Over You (Xenomania Disco Mix)"
