= Lost and Found (Martine McCutcheon album) =

Studio album by Martine McCutcheon
- Released: 11 August 2017
- Genre: Pop
- Length: 36:10
- Label: BMG
- Producer: Jack McManus

Martine McCutcheon chronology
Musicality (2002)	Lost and Found (2017)

Singles from Lost and Found
- 1. "Say I'm Not Alone" Released: 30 May 2017; 2. "Any Sign of Life" Released: 24 July 2017

Lost and Found is the fourth studio album by English actress and singer Martine McCutcheon. Her first in 15 years, it was released on 11 August 2017 by BMG. Its lead single, "Say I'm Not Alone" was released on 30 May 2017, whilst its second single titled "Any Sign of Life" was released on 24 July 2017.

== Critical reception ==
Professional ratings
Review scores
Source	Rating
The Irish News	7/10 stars
Belfast Telegraph	7/10 stars

Lucy Mapstone from The Irish News called the album an "unapologetic pop piece that reminds you that yes, she really can sing [...] McCutcheon takes you on a comfortably familiar journey with her ballad-heavy record, her musical style and vocals straight out of the 1990s – fixed in time, but pleasingly so. Unsurprisingly, it's not the most daring record but McCutcheon provides a welcome break from the current charts fodder of heavily-produced tracks."

== Commercial performance ==
Lost and Found peaked at number 17 on the UK Albums Chart, becoming McCutcheon's highest-charting album since the release of her debut album You Me & Us, which peaked at number 2 in 1999.

== Track listing ==
Lost and Found track listing
No.	Title	Writer(s)	Producer	Length
1.	"Say I'm Not Alone"	Julian Emery; Jim Irvin; Jack McManus	McManus	3:55
2.	"Maybe I Should Run"	Martine McCutcheon; Catherine McGrath; McManus	McManus	3:50
3.	"Paradise"	McCutcheon; McManus	McManus	3:55
4.	"Any Sign of Life"	Julian Bunetta; Victoria Horn; McManus	Bunetta	3:18
5.	"Stay With Me"	McCutcheon; McManus	McManus	4:33
6.	"What You Do to Me"	McCutcheon; McManus; Lisa Scinta	McManus	3:47
7.	"Cried a Little"	McCutcheon; McManus; Cathy Newell; Ciara Newell	McManus	3:29
8.	"Archive"	McCutcheon; McManus	McManus	3:17
9.	"Every Breath You Take"	Gordon Sumner	McManus	2:57
10.	"Rebellion"	McCutcheon; McManus	McManus	3:08
Total length:				36:10

== Charts ==
Weekly performance for Lost and Found
Chart (2017)	Peak position
Scottish Albums (OCC)	16
UK Albums (OCC)	17
UK Independent Albums (OCC)	4
