= Food of Love =

Food of Love may refer to:

- Food of Love (1997 film), a British film
- Food of Love (2002 film), a Spanish/German film
- Food of Love (album), a 1973 album by Yvonne Elliman
- "Food of Love" (Faith in the Future), a 1995 television episode
- "Food of Love" (Upstart Crow), a 2017 television episode
