= I'm Over You (Martine McCutcheon song) =

2000 single by Martine McCutcheon

Single by Martine McCutcheon

from the album Wishing
- Released: 23 October 2000
- Studio: The Loft (Bronxville, New York); Eden, Sarm West (London, UK)
- Length: 3:41
- Label: Innocent, Virgin
- Songwriters: Evan Rogers, Carl Sturken
- Producers: Evan Rogers, Carl Sturken

Martine McCutcheon singles chronology
"Love Me" (2000)	"I'm Over You" (2000)	"On the Radio" (2001)

"I'm Over You" is a song by Martine McCutcheon. Written by the songwriting duo Carl Sturken and Evan Rogers, the single became McCutcheon's second-highest-charting single (behind the 1999 number-one "Perfect Moment"), peaking at number two on the UK Singles Chart in November 2000. The song also found modest success in Ireland, reaching number 23.

== Track listings ==
UK CD single

1. "I'm Over You" (radio edit) – 3:42
2. "I'm Over You" (Xenomania club mix) – 7:25
3. "Perfect Moment" (Sleaze Sisters Anthem mix) – 7:30

UK cassette single

A1. "I'm Over You" (radio edit) – 3:42
A2. "I'm Over You" (G-A-Y mix) – 6:24
B1. "Rainy Days (Sleaze Sisters Anthem mix) – 8:00

== Charts ==
=== Weekly charts ===
Chart (2000)	Peak position
Europe (Eurochart Hot 100)	12
Ireland (IRMA)	23
Scottish Singles Sales (Official Charts)	3
UK Singles (Official Charts)	2

=== Year-end charts ===
Chart (2000)	Position
UK Singles (OCC)	91
