= Street Corner Symphony =

Street Corner Symphony may refer to:

- "Streetcorner Symphony", a 2006 song by Rob Thomas
- Street Corner Symphony (album), a 1978 album by Carrie Lucas
- Street Corner Symphony, a 1971 album by the Persuasions
- Street Corner Symphony (group), an a cappella group from Nashville, Tennessee
