= Moment by Moment (song) =

Single by Yvonne Elliman

from the album Moment by Moment soundtrack
- B-side: "Sailing Ships"
- Released: December 1978
- Recorded: Sunset Sound Recorders, Hollywood, 1978
- Genre: Pop, Jazz
- Length: 3:19
- Label: RSO Records
- Songwriters: Lee Holdridge, Molly-Ann Leikin
- Producer: Robert Appére

Yvonne Elliman singles chronology
"If I Can't Have You" (1977)	"Moment by Moment" (1978)	"Love Pains" (1979)

"Moment by Moment" is the title theme song to the 1978 Universal Pictures film Moment by Moment starring Lily Tomlin and John Travolta. It is written by Lee Holdridge and Molly-Ann Leikin and performed by American singer Yvonne Elliman. The song is featured twice on the film's soundtrack album, as the first track and reprised as the final track, including three instrumental versions.

The single's B-side, "Sailing Ships", is a song featured on Elliman's 1978 RSO Records album Night Flight.

== Release and reception ==
Despite the film's commercial and critical failure, "Moment by Moment" was a considerable hit for Yvonne Elliman: it entered the US Billboard Hot 100 chart in December 1978 and peaked at #59 the following month, and also reached #32 on the Adult Contemporary chart in February 1979. In Canada, the song peaked at #18 on the RPM Adult Contemporary chart in April 1979.

== Track listing ==
7" vinyl

1. "Moment by Moment" (Lee Holdridge, Molly-Ann Leikin) – 3:19
2. "Sailing Ships" (Stephen Bishop) – 4:46

== Personnel ==
- Yvonne Elliman – lead vocals
- Craig Doerge – keyboards
- Russell Kunkel – drums
- Richie Zito – guitar
- Bob Glaub – bass
- Sidney Sharp – concert master

== Chart performance ==
Chart (1978–79)	Peak position
US Billboard Hot 100	59
US Billboard Adult Contemporary	32
Canada RPM Adult Contemporary	18
