= Isabelle Lucas =

Canadian-born British actress (1927–1997)

- Born: Isabelle Harriet Lucas; 3 December 1927; Toronto, Ontario, Canada
- Died: 24 February 1997 (aged 69); Kingston-upon-Thames, England
- Occupations: Actress, singer
- Years active: 1954–1994
- Spouse: Maurice Jennings (m. 1957)

Isabelle Harriet Lucas (3 December 1927 – 24 February 1997) was a Canadian-born British actress and singer.

== Life and career ==
Isabelle Lucas was born in Toronto, Ontario, Canada, to a chef from Barbados who worked on the Canadian Pacific Railway. Lucas acted in amateur productions as a teenager in Toronto.

Lucas moved to London, England, in 1954 after performing in amateur productions in Toronto. She made her first West End appearance in the show The Jazz Train in 1955. She also performed in Walk a Crooked Mile (1959) and Funny Girl. She appeared in film and television roles during the 1950s and 1960s, including Miracle in Soho (1957).

Lucas's first major television role was in The Fosters (broadcast on ITV between 9 April 1976 and 9 July 1977), the first British sitcom to have an all-Black cast, in which she played the part of Pearl Foster, wife of Norman Beaton's lead character. Following this series she appeared in several minor British dramas and films. In 1985, she appeared in EastEnders. In 1989, she appeared in Miss Marple.

At the end of the 1980s, Lucas joined the long-running BBC Schools' show You and Me, and remained with it as a presenter until it finished in 1992. Lucas made several guest appearances in May to December from 1989 to 1992. Also in 1989, she appeared as Gertrude in the CBBC series Bluebirds. Her career ended in 1994 after an appearance in Mama Lou.

== Personal life and death ==
Lucas married Maurice Jennings in London in 1957.

Lucas died in 1997 after a heart attack.
