= Love Me (Bee Gees song) =

1976 song by the Bee Gees

Song by Bee Gees

from the album Children of the World
- Released: September 1976
- Recorded: 30 March 1976, 25 April 1976
- Studio: Criteria, Le Studio
- Genre: R&B, soul
- Length: 4:01
- Label: RSO
- Songwriters: Barry Gibb, Robin Gibb
- Producers: Barry Gibb, Robin Gibb, Maurice Gibb, Albhy Galuten, Karl Richardson

"Love Me" is a song recorded by the Bee Gees, released on the 1976 album Children of the World. It was also included on the compilation albums Bee Gees Greatest and Love from the Bee Gees, which was released only in the UK.

== Background ==
It was written by Barry and Robin Gibb featuring Robin on lead with his vibrato (with Barry on the middle eight evidenced on the outro). This makes this song a curio among the group's latterday tracks, as during the mid and late 1970s, Barry sang most of the group's leads. Robin sings a falsetto lead on the group's 1979 song "Living Together" on the album Spirits Having Flown. He also sang falsetto during the chorus of his solo song "Remedy" from the 1985 album Walls Have Eyes.

With Robin, Barry also sang the lead on the track's middle-eight.

Never even try to see things her way / It's hard on a woman when love ain't no love at all / And when she walks away, and she probably will / You're gonna be sorry, begging her, please.

Recording began on 30 March 1976 in Criteria Studios, Miami and finished on 25 April in Le Studio, Quebec, Canada same day as "I Think I'm Losing You" (unreleased).

== Yvonne Elliman version ==
"Love Me"

Single by Yvonne Elliman

from the album Love Me
- B-side: "(I Don't Know Why) I Keep Hangin' On"
- Released: September 1976
- Genre: Soul
- Length: 3:22
- Label: RSO
- Songwriters: Barry Gibb, Robin Gibb
- Producer: Freddie Perren

Yvonne Elliman singles chronology
"Walk Right In" (1975)	"Love Me" (1976)	"Hello Stranger" (1977)

=== Release ===
Yvonne Elliman's version was released as a single and reached number 14 in the United States, number six in the United Kingdom, number nine in Ireland, number three in New Zealand and South Africa, number 15 in Australia, number 11 in Canada, and number 16 in Netherlands.

Record World said that it is "Elliman's best outing in some time due to the combination of strong material and an inspired vocal performance."

=== Charts ===
Chart (1976–1977)	Weekly peak	Year-end ranking
Australia (Kent Music Report)	15	72 1977
Canada RPM Top Singles	11	125 1976
Canada RPM Adult Contemporary	3	—
Irish Singles Chart	9	—
Netherlands Dutch Top 40	16	—
New Zealand RIANZ	3	—
South Africa]	3	—
UK Singles Chart	6	52 1976
U.S. Billboard Hot 100	14	112 1976
U.S. Billboard Adult Contemporary	5	32 1977
U.S. Cash Box Top 100	10	—

== Martine McCutcheon version ==
"Love Me"

Single by Martine McCutcheon

from the album You Me & Us
- A-side: "Talking in Your Sleep"
- Released: 22 November 1999
- Length: 3:44
- Label: Innocent, Virgin
- Songwriters: Barry Gibb, Robin Gibb
- Producer: Tony Moran

Martine McCutcheon singles chronology
"I've Got You" (1999)	"Love Me" / "Talking in Your Sleep" (1999)	"I'm Over You" (2000)

Children in Need singles chronology
"Especially for You" (1998)	"Love Me" (1999)	"Never Had a Dream Come True" (2000)

=== Background and release ===
Martine McCutcheon remade "Love Me" for her 1999 debut album, You Me & Us, from which the track—serving as the BBC Children in Need single for 1999—was issued as the third single. It was released as a double A-side single along with "Talking in Your Sleep" on 22 November 1999 and peaked at number six in the United Kingdom.

McCutcheon performed the song at the Children in Need telethon on 26 November 1999. She was supported by 100 children between the age of eight and thirteen, who were selected through nationwide auditions. The successful children had the chance to spend a day in a recording studio with McCutcheon, before serving as backing singers for the song on live television.

=== Track listing ===
1. "Love Me" (radio mix)- 3:44
2. "Talking in Your Sleep" (radio edit) - 4:06

=== Charts ===
==== Weekly charts ====
Chart (1999)	Peak position
Europe (Eurochart Hot 100)	31
Ireland (IRMA)	26
Scottish Singles Sales (Official Charts)	10
UK Singles (Official Charts)	6

==== Year-end charts ====
Chart (1999)	Position
UK Singles (OCC)	130

== Other versions ==
"Love Me" was also recorded by Janie Fricke for her 1981 album Sleeping With Your Memory and cantopop artist Prudence Liew for her 1994 album Thoughts in the Night, Dreams During the Day.
