= Musicality (album) =

Studio album by Martine McCutcheon
- Released: 2 December 2002
- Genre: Pop
- Length: 54:21
- Label: EMI Music Distribution

Martine McCutcheon chronology
Wishing (2000)	Musicality (2002)	Lost and Found (2017)

Musicality is the third solo album from English actress-singer Martine McCutcheon. It was released by EMI Music Distribution on 2 December 2002. The album features covers of songs from McCutcheon's favourite musicals, including Mamma Mia! and Les Misérables. It debuted and peaked at number 55 on the UK Albums Chart and was certified silver by the British Phonographic Industry (BPI).

== Critical reception ==
Professional ratings
Review scores
Source	Rating
AllMusic	1.5/5 stars

AllMusic editor John Lucas rated the album one and a half out of five stars. He wrote that "McCutcheon clearly has a great fondness for the material here, and she has a big, expressive voice, but unfortunately the pedestrian arrangements on this album render it another dull and unsatisfying effort. Also, the choice of material ranges from predictable to bizarre. Some bright spots save the record from being a complete waste of time." Nick Reynolds from BBC Music found that Musicality was "frustrating". He felt that it was "refreshing to see Martine McCutcheon tackling Broadway standards and songs from the shows. She has professed her love of Barbra Streisand and Liza Minnelli, and must be applauded for having the courage to tackle this material [...] but the selection of songs is patchy, poorly sequenced and does not always play to Martine's strengths."

== Commercial performance ==
Musicality debuted and peaked at number 55 on the UK Albums Chart. On 6 December 2002, it was certified silver by the British Phonographic Industry (BPI).

== Track listing ==
1. "Maybe This Time" – from Cabaret
2. "Zing Went the Strings of My Heart" – from Listen Darling
3. "White Christmas" – from Holiday Inn
4. "I Dreamed a Dream" – from Les Misérables
5. "The Lady Is a Tramp" – from Babes in Arms
6. "Diamonds Are a Girl's Best Friend" – from Gentlemen Prefer Blondes
7. "Don't Rain on My Parade" – from Funny Girl
8. "Out Here on My Own" – from Fame
9. "What I Did for Love" – from A Chorus Line
10. "There Are Worse Things I Could Do" – from Grease
11. "The Winner Takes It All" – from Mamma Mia!
12. "Can You Feel the Love Tonight" – from The Lion King
13. "Wouldn't It Be Luverely" – from My Fair Lady
14. "Wishing You Were Somehow Here Again" – from The Phantom of the Opera
15. "The Man That Got Away" – from A Star Is Born
16. "Nobody Does It Like Me" – from See-Saw

== Charts ==
Weekly performance for Musicality
Chart (2002)	Peak position
Scottish Albums (OCC)	58
UK Albums (OCC)	55

== Certifications ==
Certifications for Musicality
Region	Certification	Certified units/sales
United Kingdom (BPI)	Silver	60,000^{^}
^{^} Shipments figures based on certification alone.
