= Carrie Lucas in Danceland =

Studio album by Carrie Lucas
- Released: 1979
- Recorded: 1979
- Genre: Disco
- Label: SOLAR

Carrie Lucas chronology
Street Corner Symphony (1978)	Carrie Lucas in Danceland (1979)	Portrait of Carrie (1980)

Carrie Lucas in Danceland is the third studio album by American singer Carrie Lucas, released in 1979 on the SOLAR Records label.

== Critical reception ==
Professional ratings
Review scores
Source	Rating
AllMusic	4/5 stars
The Virgin Encyclopedia of R&B and Soul	2/5 stars

The Morning Call deemed Carrie Lucas in Danceland "one of the premier disco albums of late."

== Track listing ==
1. "Danceland" - (Malcolm Anthony) - 6:54
2. "Sometimes a Love Goes Wrong" (Ken Hirsch/Steven Milburn) - 4:09
3. "Are You Dancing" - (Carrie Lucas/William B. Shelby/Norman Beavers) - 6:19
4. "Dance with You" - (Kossi Gardner) - 6:36
5. "I'm Gonna Make You Happy" - (Carrie Lucas/William B. Shelby/Norman Beavers) - 4:15
6. "Southern Star" - (Kossi Gardner) - 6:39

== Charts ==
=== Album ===
Year	Chart positions		Record label
Year	US	US R&B	Record label
1979	119	37	SOLAR Records

=== Singles ===
Year	Single	Chart positions		
Year	Single	US	US R&B	US Dance
1979	"Dance with You"	70	27	6
