= Still in Love (album) =

Studio album by Carrie Lucas
- Released: 1982
- Recorded: 1982
- Genre: Soul; dance-pop
- Label: SOLAR Records

Carrie Lucas chronology
Portrait of Carrie (1980)	Still in Love (1982)	Horsin' Around (1984)

Professional ratings
Review scores
Source	Rating
AllMusic	4/5 stars

Still in Love is the fifth studio album by American singer Carrie Lucas. Released in 1982 on the SOLAR Records label.

== Track listing ==
1. "Show Me Where You're Coming From"
2. "Sweet Love"
3. "Men"
4. "Is It a Dream?"
5. "Rockin' for Your Love"
6. "Dreamer"
7. "I Just Can't Do Without Your Love"
8. "Still in Love"

=== Album ===
Year	Album	Chart positions		Record label
Year	Album	US	US R&B	Record label
1982	Still In Love	80	13	SOLAR Records

=== Singles ===
Year	Single	Chart positions		
Year	Single	US	US R&B	US Dance
1982	"Show Me Where You're Coming From"	—	23	—
