= If I Can't Have You (Bee Gees song) =

1977 song by the Bee Gees

Song by Bee Gees
- A-side: "Stayin' Alive"
- Released: 15 December 1977
- Recorded: January and February 1977; September 1977
- Studio: Le Chateau (Herouville, France); Cherokee (Los Angeles)
- Genre: Disco
- Length: 2:57
- Label: RSO
- Songwriters: Barry Gibb; Robin Gibb; Maurice Gibb
- Producers: Bee Gees; Albhy Galuten; Karl Richardson

Audio
- "If I Can't Have You" on YouTube

"If I Can't Have You" is a disco song written by the Bee Gees in 1977. The song initially appeared on the Saturday Night Fever soundtrack in a version by Yvonne Elliman, released in November 1977. The Bee Gees' own version appeared a month later as the B-side of "Stayin' Alive".

The song later appeared on the Bee Gees' compilation Their Greatest Hits: The Record. The remixed version was released and remastered in the compilation Bee Gees Greatest in 2007 and marked the return of the Bee Gees to the US Hot Dance Tracks charts after 28 years. According to Maurice, this track was the first song they did while they were recording the other songs for the film. The recording was started at Château d'Hérouville as a basic track only and completed later at Cherokee Studios in Los Angeles.

== Yvonne Elliman version ==
"If I Can't Have You"
- Side A of US 7-inch single

Single by Yvonne Elliman

from the album Saturday Night Fever and Night Flight
- B-side: "Good Sign"
- Released: January 23, 1978
- Recorded: 1977
- Genre: R&B, soul, blue-eyed soul, disco
- Length: 2:57; 4:00 (extended version)
- Label: RSO; Polydor
- Songwriters: Barry; Robin; Maurice Gibb
- Producer: Freddie Perren

Yvonne Elliman singles chronology
"I Can't Get You Outa My Mind" (1977)	"If I Can't Have You" (1978)	"Moment by Moment" (1978)

Audio
- "If I Can't Have You" on YouTube

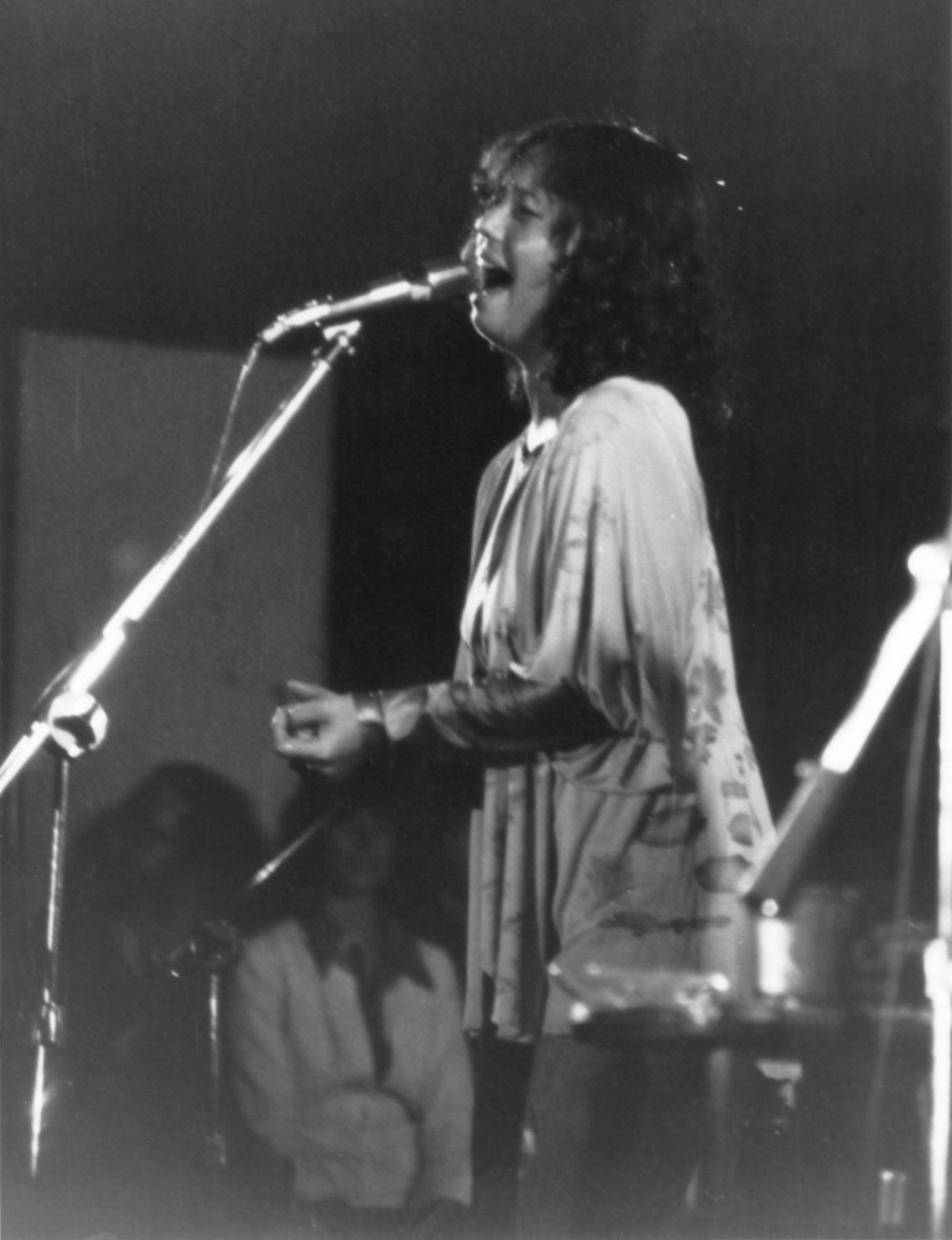
Yvonne Elliman, 1975

The song was recorded by American singer, songwriter, and actress Yvonne Elliman for the Saturday Night Fever soundtrack.

Although Yvonne Elliman had cut her 1976 album, Love Me, with producer Freddie Perren, who was a major force in the disco movement (Perren had produced the Sylvers' 1976 number 1 "Boogie Fever" and would soon collaborate with Gloria Gaynor on the disco anthem "I Will Survive"), Love Me had showcased Elliman not as a disco artist but rather as a pop ballad singer, notably on the title cut, a Barry and Robin Gibb composition that Elliman turned into an international hit. It was originally intended that Elliman's contribution to the Saturday Night Fever soundtrack would be another ballad written by the Gibb brothers, "How Deep Is Your Love".

Meanwhile, the Bee Gees recorded their own version of "If I Can't Have You" for the film. However, RSO Records chairman and Bee Gees manager Robert Stigwood, who was executive-producing the Saturday Night Fever album, dictated that the Bee Gees record "How Deep Is Your Love" and Elliman be given the disco-style "If I Can't Have You".

Stigwood's decisions proved a success as the soundtrack's first single, the Bee Gees' version of the ballad "How Deep Is Your Love", shot to number one, followed to the top spot by the soundtrack's second and third singles, also by the Gibb brothers, "Stayin' Alive" and "Night Fever". Elliman's "If I Can't Have You", produced by Perren, was released as the fourth single off the Saturday Night Fever album in February 1978. Billboard Magazine praised Elliman's "powerful" vocal performance. Cash Box said that it was "pop music with a very danceable beat" and that Elliman's vocal was unique enough that it would not create confusion with any Bee Gees recording. As the first single off the Saturday Night Fever soundtrack not performed by the Bee Gees, "If I Can't Have You" would become the fourth number 1 hit from the album, reaching the number one spot on the US Hot 100 in Billboard dated 13 May 1978, ending an eight-week number 1 tenure by "Night Fever". "If I Can't Have You" was the fourth consecutive US number 1 to be co-written by Barry Gibb, and the RSO record label's sixth consecutive number one on the US Hot 100. The B-side of the Elliman single was a song from the Love Me album, "Good Sign", a composition by Melissa Manchester and Carole Bayer Sager which had also served as the B-side of Elliman's hit "Hello Stranger".

"If I Can't Have You" was featured on Elliman's February 1978 album release Night Flight, which, apart from that song, was produced by Robert Appère and was not disco-oriented. No song from Night Flight was issued as a follow-up single to "If I Can't Have You", Elliman's next single being a rock ballad entitled "Savannah" which failed to consolidate Elliman's potential mainstream stardom. Elliman did return to disco music in 1979 with "Love Pains" which returned her to the US Top 40 one more time before she dropped out of the music scene in the 1980s.

Elliman's "If I Can't Have You" was also featured in the 1999 film Big Daddy as well as on its soundtrack album.

=== Personnel ===
- Yvonne Elliman – lead vocals
- Bob Bowles – guitar
- Sonny Burke – keyboards
- Paulinho da Costa – percussion
- Scott Edwards – bass
- James Gadson – drums
- Freddie Perren – synthesizer, percussion
- Julia Tillman Waters, Marti McCall, Maxine Willard Waters - backing vocals
- Bob Zimmitti – percussion

=== Weekly charts ===
Chart (1978)	Peak position
Australia (Kent Music Report)	9
Belgium (Ultratop 50 Flanders)	24
Canada Top Singles (RPM)	1
Canada Adult Contemporary (RPM)	2
France (SNEP)	5
Ireland (IRMA)	20
Netherlands (Dutch Top 40)	28
Netherlands (Single Top 100)	31
Netherlands	28
New Zealand (Recorded Music NZ)	6
UK Singles (OCC)	4
US Billboard Hot 100	1
US Adult Contemporary (Billboard)	9
US Hot R&B Singles (Billboard)	60
US Record World Singles	2

=== Year-end charts ===
Chart (1978)	Rank
Australia (Kent Music Report)	52
Canada	13
UK	45
US Billboard Hot 100	19

=== Certifications ===
Region	Certification	Certified units/sales
New Zealand (RMNZ)	Gold	15,000^{‡}
United States (RIAA)	Gold	1,000,000^{^}
^{‡} Sales+streaming figures based on certification alone.

== Kim Wilde version ==
"If I Can't Have You"

Single by Kim Wilde

from the album The Singles Collection 1981–1993
- B-side: "Never Felt So Alive"
- Released: 28 June 1993
- Genre: Disco; house
- Length: 3:27
- Label: MCA
- Songwriters: Barry Gibb; Robin Gibb; Maurice Gibb
- Producer: Ricki Wilde

Kim Wilde singles chronology
"Million Miles Away" (1992)	"If I Can't Have You" (1993)	"In My Life" (1993)

Music video
- "If I Can't Have You" on YouTube

"If I Can't Have You" was covered in 1993 by British singer Kim Wilde and recorded as one of two new tracks on her second compilation album, The Singles Collection 1981–1993 (1993). Produced by Ricki Wilde and released in June 1993 by MCA Records, the single reached number 12 on the UK Singles Chart and number six on the UK Dance Singles Chart. The song also peaked within the top 10 in Australia, Belgium and Ireland, and was a top-20 hit in Iceland, Israel and the Netherlands. It was released in several extended remixes on the 12-inch and CD-single formats. The B-side was an exclusive non-album track called "Never Felt So Alive". The accompanying music video for "If I Can't Have You" was directed by Irish director Michael Geoghegan.

=== Critical reception ===
Larry Flick from Billboard magazine called it a "NRGetic rendition", adding it as "a delicious guilty pleasure, oozing with over-the-top strings and angelic backing vocals. Kim works her program for all it's worth—and we're buying it bigtime." Pan-European magazine Music & Media commented, "The brothers Gibb—a.k.a. the Bee Gees—wrote this song for Yvonne Elliman in the heyday of disco in the end of the '70s and Wilde recycles the song in the dance era. The kids will absolutely go wild(e) on this one." Alan Jones from Music Week gave the song three out of five, writing that "this lacklustre cover lacks the finesse of the original and it won't be one of Wilde's biggest hits."

=== Charts ===
==== Weekly charts ====
Chart (1993)	Peak position
Australia (ARIA)	3
Austria (Ö3 Austria Top 40)	29
Belgium (Ultratop 50 Flanders)	6
Europe (Eurochart Hot 100)	33
Europe (European Hit Radio)	12
Germany (GfK)	51
Iceland (Íslenski Listinn Topp 40)	16
Ireland (IRMA)	9
Israel (Israeli Singles Chart)	15
Netherlands (Dutch Top 40)	23
Netherlands (Single Top 100)	18
Sweden (Sverigetopplistan)	24
Switzerland (Schweizer Hitparade)	18
UK Singles (Official Charts)	12
UK Airplay (Music Week)	14
UK Dance (Music Week)	6
US Dance Club Play (Billboard)	14
US Maxi-Singles Sales (Billboard)	48

==== Year-end charts ====
Chart (1993)	Position
Australia (ARIA)	21
Belgium (Ultratop 50 Flanders)	46
Netherlands (Dutch Top 40)	170
Sweden (Topplistan)	91

=== Certifications ===
Region	Certification	Certified units/sales
Australia (ARIA)	Platinum	70,000^{^}
^{^} Shipments figures based on certification alone.

=== Release history ===
Region	Date	Format(s)	Label(s)	Ref.
United Kingdom	28 June 1993	12-inch vinyl; CD; cassette	MCA	
Australia	16 August 1993	CD; cassette	MCA	
Japan	8 September 1993	Mini-CD	MCA	

== Other versions ==
"If I Can't Have You" was covered in 1987 by future Nightcrawlers singer John Robinson Reid and Culture Club guitarist Roy Hay under the name This Way Up. The single was produced by Hay, and was the duo's second single. It reached number 76 on the UK Singles chart in October 1987.

On 2 November 2007, Rhino and Reprise Records released a remix version of "If I Can't Have You" by German house music production duo the Disco Boys. The song was released as a single from the remastered version of Bee Gees Greatest (2007), originally released in 1979, and peaked at number 71 on the Top 100 Singles chart (Germany) on its debut week of November 16, 2007, and number 47 on the US Hot Dance Club Play chart in January 2008.

In 2016, English singer and songwriter Jess Glynne re-recorded "If I Can't Have You" in support of the French musical Saturday Night Fever, which premiered in 2017. Warner Music France released it as a promotional single on 22 May 2016. This version peaked at number 104.
