= Portrait of Carrie =

Studio album by Carrie Lucas
- Released: 1980
- Recorded: 1980
- Genre: Soul; disco; boogie
- Label: SOLAR Records
- Producer: Dick Griffey * Leon Sylvers III

Carrie Lucas chronology
Carrie Lucas in Danceland (1979)	Portrait of Carrie (1980)	Still in Love (1982)

Professional ratings
Review scores
Source	Rating
AllMusic	4/5 stars

Portrait of Carrie is the fourth studio album by American singer Carrie Lucas. Released in 1980 on the SOLAR Records label.

== Track listing ==
1. "It's Not What You Got (It's How You Use It)" 6:26
2. "Lovin' Is on My Mind" 4:07
3. "Career Girl" 6:52
4. "Use It or Lose It" 4:44
5. "Fashion" 6:42
6. "Just a Memory" 5:54
7. "I Gotta Keep Dancin' (Keep Smiling) [12" Version]" 7:38

=== Album ===
Year	Album	Chart positions		Record label
Year	Album	US	US R&B	Record label
1980	Portrait of Carrie	185	57	SOLAR Records

=== Singles ===
Year	Single	Chart positions		
Year	Single	US	US R&B	US Dance
1980	"I Gotta Keep Dancin' (Keep Smiling)"	—	—	10
1980	"It's Not What You Got (It's How You Use It)"	—	74	—
