= Bluebirds (TV series) =

- Starring: Barbara Windsor
- Country of origin: United Kingdom
- Original language: English
- No. of series: 1
- No. of episodes: 6

Production
- Running time: 22 minutes

Original release
- Network: Children's BBC
- Release: 5 October – 9 November 1989

Bluebirds is a Children's BBC drama most notable for featuring Barbara Windsor and Martine McCutcheon. First broadcast on 5 October 1989, the show ran for six episodes.

The cast also features regulars Isabelle Lucas, Sheila Steafel, Pauline Delaney, Graeme Lally, Sean Blowers and Lance Percival.

== Synopsis ==
Set in London, it follows the adventures of youth group called the Bluebirds. The bluebirds try and protect their housing project from vandalism by local criminal Robbins.

== Cast ==
- Isabelle Lucas as Gertrude Landing
- Pauline Delaney as Ivy Longford
- Sheila Steafel as Anne Shreiber
- Barbara Windsor as Mabel Fletcher
- Joseph Kpobie as Granville Landing
- Mark Decouteau as Leroy Anderson
- Alan Dean as Dave Parks
- Martine Mccutcheon as Mandy
- Martino Lazzeri as Jerry Williams
- Lance Percival as Derek Proudfoot
- Ron Pember as Mr Cullen
- Beryl Cooke as Mrs Jenkinson
- Dennis Edwards as Mr Jenkinson
- Sean Blowers as Bill Parks
- Grant Oatley as Robbins
- Jimmy Lambert as Pete
- Albert Moses as Mr Patel
