= You Me & Us =

Studio album by Martine McCutcheon
- Released: 6 September 1999
- Genre: Pop
- Length: 50:57
- Label: Innocent
- Producer: Tony Moran

Martine McCutcheon chronology
You Me & Us (1999)	Wishing (2000)

You Me & Us is the debut album by English pop singer and actress Martine McCutcheon. It was released by Innocent Records on 6 September 1999. The album peaked at number two on the UK Albums Chart and reached platinum in the United Kingdom.

== Background ==
"Maybe This Time" is also a remake, the song having been introduced by Liza Minnelli in the film Cabaret.

== Promotion ==
The lead single taken from the album was "Perfect Moment", which reached number one on the UK Singles Chart and received a platinum certification in the UK. A second single, "I've Got You", was released from the album in September 1999. It charted at number six in the UK. The third and final single was the double A-side "Talking in Your Sleep"/"Love Me," remakes of "Talking in Your Sleep" by Crystal Gayle and "Love Me" by Yvonne Elliman. "Love Me" was also chosen as the 1999 BBC Children in Need single, with all proceeds from the release going to the charity. The single also reached number six 6 on the UK Singles Chart, while also being awarded a silver certification.

== Critical reception ==
Professional ratings
Review scores
Source	Rating
AllMusic	3.5/5 stars
The Independent	2/5 stars
MTV Asia	8/10
NME	6/10

AllMusic editor John Lucas rated the album three and a half out of five stars. He noted that the "majority of You, Me & Us is made up of mid-tempo ballads which seem custom-made for adult contemporary radio. This sound is a good fit for McCutcheon, playing on her girl next door appeal and placing her alongside her idols Barbra Streisand and Celine Dion. Fans of those artists will certainly find much to enjoy here." Lucas concluded: "If nothing on the record particularly excites, there's nothing which will have you reaching for the skip button either."

NME found that the album was "drenched in the usual emotional troths one would expect from a young woman whose favourite singers are Barbra Streisand and Luther Vandross [...] This is, then, an immensely reassuring album. Just as Tiffany was never heard to mention she fancied going to Bowlie, so Martine never once pretends that there's always been an Alanis element to her music." Writing for The Independent, Tim Perry called You, Me & Us a "competent, well-produced album," on which Martine McCutcheon "sings well on Crystal Gayle's "Talking in Your Sleep" and tackles show tunes and wispy indie songs well too. Mind you, if she hadn't been Tiffany this album would sell in the hundreds rather than tens of thousands."

== Commercial performance ==
You Me & Us debuted and peaked at number two on the UK Albums Chart in the week ending 18 September 1999. A steady seller, it was certified both silver and gold by the British Phonographic Industry (BPI) on 10 September 1999 and reached platinum status on 5 November. The Official Charts Company (OCC) ranked it 25h on its 1999 year-end list.

== Track listing ==
All tracks produced by Tony Moran.

You Me & Us track listing
No.	Title	Writer(s)	Length
1.	"Perfect Moment"	Wendy Page; Jim Marr	3:46
2.	"Falling Apart"	Martine McCutcheon; Jason Hazeley; Ben Parker	4:31
3.	"I've Got You"	Jon Wolfson; Kara DioGuardi; Tony Coluccio; Tony Moran	3:42
4.	"Talking in Your Sleep"	Bobby Wood; Roger Cook	4:35
5.	"Secret Garden"	Matt Goss; Nona Hendryx	4:46
6.	"Rainy Days"	Albert Melendez; Kara DioGuardi; Moran	4:27
7.	"You, Me & Us"	McCutcheon; Hazeley; Parker	4:24
8.	"First Time (I Fell in Love)"	Gordon Chambers; Phil Galdston	4:03
9.	"Love Me"	Barry Gibb; Robin Gibb	3:44
10.	"If Only"	McCutcheon; Hazeley; Parker	3:47
11.	"Tremble"	McCutcheon; Hazeley; Parker	4:59
12.	"Maybe This Time"	Fred Ebb; John Kander	2:55
Total length:			50:57

== Charts ==
=== Weekly charts ===
Weekly performance for You Me & Us
Chart (1999–2000)	Peak position
Irish Albums (IRMA)	14
New Zealand Albums (RMNZ)	42
Scottish Albums (OCC)	5
UK Albums (OCC)	2

=== Year-end charts ===
Year-end performance for You Me & Us
Chart (1999)	Position
UK Albums (OCC)	25

== Certifications ==
Certifications for You Me & Us
Region	Certification	Certified units/sales
United Kingdom (BPI)	Platinum	300,000^{^}
^{^} Shipments figures based on certification alone.
