= I Can't Get You Outa My Mind =

Single by Yvonne Elliman

from the album Love Me
- B-side: "I Know"
- Released: July 1977
- Genre: Pop
- Length: 3:05
- Label: RSO
- Songwriters: B.J. Verdi, C. Yarian
- Producer: Freddie Perren

Yvonne Elliman singles chronology
"Hello Stranger" (1977)	"I Can't Get You Outa My Mind" (1977)	"If I Can't Have You" (1978)

"I Can't Get You Outa My Mind" is a song by Yvonne Elliman, released as the third single from her 1976 album Love Me.

It became an adult contemporary hit in the United States (#19) and Canada (#11). It also reached #17 on the UK Singles Chart.

"I Can't Get You Outa My Mind" was featured in a two-part 1979 episode of Hawaii Five-O in which Elliman also had a guest role as a Hawaiian singer.

== Chart history ==
Chart (1977)	Peak position
Canada RPM Adult Contemporary	11
Netherlands (Single Top 100)	25
UK Singles Chart (OCC)	17
US Billboard Adult Contemporary	19
