= Happy Ever After (British TV series) =

British TV sitcom (1974–1979)

- Genre: Sitcom
- Starring: Terry Scott; June Whitfield; Beryl Cooke
- Country of origin: United Kingdom
- Original language: English
- No. of series: 5
- No. of episodes: 41

Production
- Running time: 30 minutes

Original release
- Network: BBC1
- Release: 7 May 1974 – 25 April 1979

Related
- Terry and June

Happy Ever After is a British sitcom starring Terry Scott and June Whitfield. It aired from 7 May 1974 to 25 April 1979 on BBC1.

The series was co-written by scriptwriters John T. Chapman, Eric Merriman, Christopher Bond, John Kane and Jon Watkins.

After Happy Ever After ended, Scott and Whitfield starred in Terry and June from October 1979 to August 1987, a sitcom that was similar to Happy Ever After (minus Aunt Lucy), with Terry and June's surname changed from Fletcher to Medford and the setting moved to Purley.

== Cast ==
- Terry Scott as Terry Fletcher
- June Whitfield as June Fletcher
- Beryl Cooke as Aunt Lucy
- Lena Clemo as Susan Fletcher (pilot)
- Pippa Page as Susan Fletcher (from series 2)
- Caroline Whitaker as Debbie Fletcher

== Plot ==
Terry and June Fletcher are a middle-aged, middle-class couple who find themselves alone when their grown-up children, daughters Susan and Debbie, leave home. However, they are not alone for long as Aunt Lucy comes to live with them, along with her talking mynah bird.

Terry frequently hits upon an idea, which due to his foolhardy and obsessive manner he then continues with whatever the consequences, while June remains patient and tolerant.

== Episodes ==
=== Pilot (1974) ===
Written by John Chapman and Eric Merriman

- Pilot (7 May 1974) (part of Comedy Playhouse)

=== Series One (1974) ===
All episodes written by John Chapman and Eric Merriman

1. "The Hotel" (17 July 1974)
2. "Terry's Church Sermon" (31 July 1974)
3. "Amateur Dramatics" (7 August 1974)
4. "The French Businessman" (14 August 1974)
5. "Keep Fit" (21 August 1974)

=== Series Two (1976) ===
All episodes written by John Chapman and Eric Merriman

1. "A Country Cottage" (8 January 1976)
2. "Old Folks' Party" (15 January 1976)
3. "Lucy's Premium Bond" (22 January 1976)
4. "Telemania" (29 January 1976)
5. "Terry in Court" (5 February 1976)
6. "The Flower Show" (12 February 1976)
7. "June's Day in Bed" (19 February 1976)
8. "Frank's Return" (26 February 1976)
9. "Filming the Fletchers" (4 March 1976)
10. "Terry the Author" (11 March 1976)

=== Series Three (1976) ===
All episodes written by John Chapman and Eric Merriman

1. "Foster Fletchers" (9 September 1976)
2. "Restoration Piece" (16 September 1976)
3. "It's All in the Title" (23 September 1976)
4. "Mistaken Identikit" (30 September 1976)
5. "Rally Ho" (7 October 1976)
6. "Separation of Convenience" (14 October 1976)
7. "The Protest" (21 October 1976)
8. "Foreign Exchange" (28 October 1976)
9. "Tea For Two" (4 November 1976)

=== Christmas Special (1976) ===
- "Christmas" (23 December 1976) – Written by John Chapman and Eric Merriman

=== Series Four (1977) ===
All episodes written by John Chapman and Eric Merriman

1. "Hello Sailor" (8 September 1977)
2. "Talk of the Devil" (15 September 1977)
3. "You've Got to Have Art" (22 September 1977)
4. "A Proper Charlie" (29 September 1977)
5. "He Who Excavates Is Last" (6 October 1977)
6. "Never Boring" (13 October 1977)
7. "Never Put It in Writing" (20 October 1977)

=== Christmas Special (1977) ===
- "June's Parents" (23 December 1977) – Written by Eric Merriman and Christopher Bond

=== Series Five (1978) ===
1. "Watch Your Weight" (5 September 1978) – Written by Eric Merriman and Christopher Bond
2. "The Music Went Around & Around" (12 September 1978) – Written by John Kane
3. "Rogue Male" (19 September 1978) – Written by John Kane
4. "The King & June" (26 September 1978) – Written by Eric Merriman and Christopher Bond
5. "A Woman Called Ironside" (3 October 1978) – Written by Eric Merriman and Christopher Bond
6. "The More We Are Together" (10 October 1978) – Written by Jon Watkins

=== Special (1979) ===
- "The Go Between" (25 April 1979) – Written by Eric Merriman and Christopher Bond

== Home media ==
All five series, pilot and specials of the sitcom were released onto DVD on 26 September 2016.
