= I've Got You (Martine McCutcheon song) =

1999 single by Martine McCutcheon

Single by Martine McCutcheon

from the album You Me & Us
- B-side: "Never Lose Your Faith in Love"; "Hold Me Tighter in the Rain"
- Released: 30 August 1999
- Studio: Sound Barrier (New York City)
- Length: 3:42
- Label: Innocent; Virgin
- Songwriters: Tony Moran; Kara DioGuardi; Tony Coluccio; Jon Wolfson
- Producer: Tony Moran

Martine McCutcheon singles chronology
| "Perfect Moment" (1999) | "I've Got You" (1999) | "Love Me" / "Talking in Your Sleep" (1999) |

Audio
- "I've Got You" on YouTube

"I've Got You" is a song by English actress and singer Martine McCutcheon. It was written by Tony Moran, Kara DioGuardi, Tony Coluccio and Jon Wolfson, and it was included on McCutcheon's debut studio album, You Me & Us (1999). Produced by Moran, "I've Got You" was released as the second single from the album, after "Perfect Moment", on 30 August 1999. The song afforded McCutcheon another top-10 hit in the UK, peaking at number six on the UK Singles Chart, and also reached number 17 on the Irish Singles Chart.

== Release and reception ==
"I've Got You" received a boost in airplay on UK radio in early August 1999, and on 30 August, it was officially released as a single across three formats: two CD singles and a cassette single. Critically, British trade publication Music Week wrote that the song was not as good as Martine McCutcheon's previous single, "Perfect Moment", but noted its strong chorus. British columnist James Masterton wrote that the track's chorus would "sound perfect on a Sheryl Crow b-side" but doubted the song's ability to appeal to a wide audience.

On the week beginning 4 September 1999, "I've Got You" debuted at its peak of number six on the UK Singles Chart, giving McCutcheon her second top-10 hit in the UK, after "Perfect Moment". The song spent a total of 12 weeks in the UK top 100, making it her third-longest stay on the chart. In Ireland, the single debuted on the Irish Singles Chart on 2 September 1999 and peaked at number 17, becoming McCutcheon's second of three top-20 hits on this chart, and remained in the top 30 for six weeks. With its combined British and Irish sales, "I've Got You" debuted at number 30, its peak, on the Eurochart Hot 100 in mid-September and remained on the listing for five weeks, making its last appearance on 16 October 1999.

== Track listings ==
UK CD1 and cassette single

1. "I've Got You" – 3:42
2. "Never Lose Your Faith in Love" – 3:06
3. "Hold Me Tighter in the Rain" – 3:16

UK CD2

1. "I've Got You" – 3:42
2. "I've Got You" (instrumental) – 3:42
3. "Perfect Moment" (instrumental) – 3:49
4. "I've Got You" (video)

== Credits and personnel ==
Credits are lifted from the UK CD1 liner notes and the You Me & Us album booklet.

Studios

- Recorded at mixed at Sound Barrier Studios (New York City)
- Strings recorded at Angel Studios (London, England)
- Mastered at Metropolis Studios (London, England)

Personnel

- Tony Moran – writing, production, arrangement
- Kara DioGuardi – writing
- Tony Coluccio – writing, keyboards, keyboard programming, Pro Tools
- Jon Wolfson – writing
- Bernd Schoenhart – guitar, bass
- Duke Mushroom – percussion
- Dave Saronson – recording, mixing, engineering
- Jason Hazeley – string arrangement, conducting
- Niall Acott – string engineering
- Tom Jenkins – assistant string engineering
- Jeff Damo – assistant engineering
- Tom Chianti – assistant engineering
- Giuseppe D – Pro Tools
- Mark Rubenstein – Pro Tools
- Tim Young – mastering
- Joe Pearson – artwork design
- Paul Cox – photography

== Charts ==
=== Weekly charts ===
| Chart (1999) | Peak position |
|---|---|
| Europe (Eurochart Hot 100) | 30 |
| Ireland (IRMA) | 17 |
| Scotland Singles (OCC) | 4 |
| UK Singles (OCC) | 6 |

=== Year-end charts ===
| Chart (1999) | Position |
|---|---|
| UK Singles (OCC) | 120 |
