= Martine McCutcheon =

English actress and singer (born 1976)

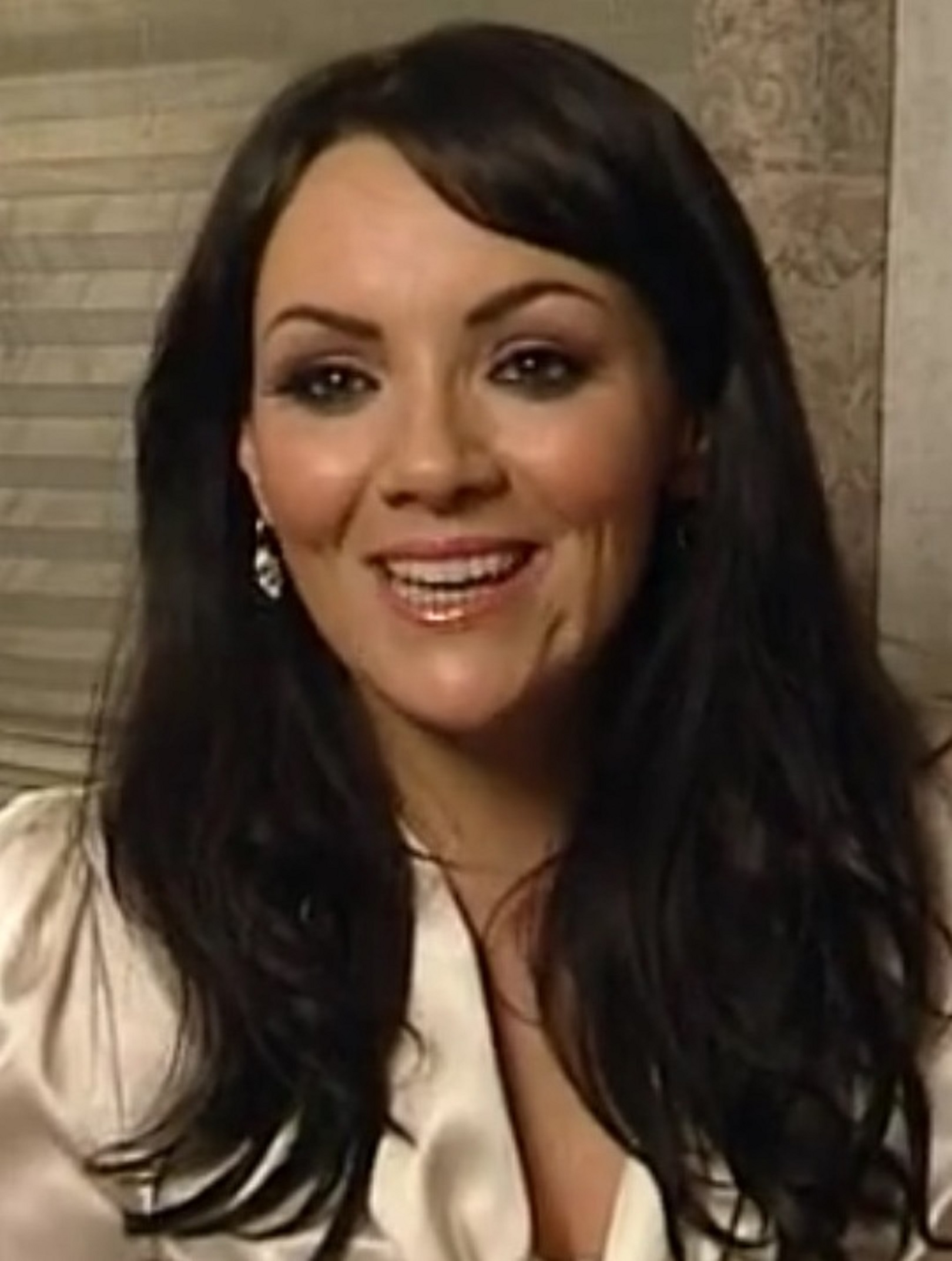
- McCutcheon in 2010
- Born: Martine Kimberley Sherrie Ponting; 14 May 1976 (age 50); Hackney, London, England
- Education: Italia Conti Academy of Theatre Arts
- Occupations: Actress; singer
- Years active: 1988–present
- Known for: EastEnders; Love Actually; My Fair Lady
- Spouse: Jack McManus (m. 2012; sep. 2024)
- Children: 1
- Awards: Laurence Olivier Award
- Musical career
- Genre: Pop
- Years active: 1995–present
- Labels: Innocent, Virgin, Liberty, BMG

Martine Kimberley Sherrie McCutcheon (born Ponting, born 14 May 1976) is an English former actress and singer. She began appearing in television commercials at an early age and made her television debut in the children's television drama Bluebirds in 1989. In the early 1990s, she had minor success as one third of the pop group Milan, but it was her role as Tiffany Mitchell in the BBC's soap opera EastEnders and her role in the 2003 romantic comedy Love Actually that brought her stardom. For the former she won the National Television Award, while the latter earned her the Empire and MTV Movie awards. She was written out of EastEnders at the end of 1998 and then embarked on a pop career, this time as a solo artist.

McCutcheon's debut studio album, You Me & Us (1999), peaked at number two in the UK, and spawned the UK number one single "Perfect Moment" and two further UK top 10 entries, "I've Got You" and the double-sided "Talking in Your Sleep/"Love Me". Its follow-up, Wishing (2000), was less commercially successful but produced two UK top 10 singles: "I'm Over You" and "On the Radio". Her pop career stalled due to the poor reception of her 2002 third album, Musicality (2002). She returned to music in 2017 with the album Lost and Found. Outside of music, McCutcheon continued to appear in television programmes, films and stage productions; her portrayal of Eliza Doolittle in My Fair Lady won her a Laurence Olivier Award in 2002. She released her autobiography Who Does She Think She Is? in 2000.

== Early life ==
Martine Kimberley Sherrie Ponting was born on 14 May 1976 at the Salvation Army Mothers' Hospital in the London Borough of Hackney to Jenny Ponting and Thomas "Keith" Hemmings. While in a relationship with Keith, Jenny experienced domestic violence, which continued for many years after their split. After one of many incidents in which he attempted to kill both Jenny and Martine, he was arrested and later charged and remanded in custody for six months. Jenny then met John McCutcheon, whom she later married. When Martine was nine, Keith contacted Jenny and asked for access to her. Jenny refused, prompting him to seek sole custody of Martine through the courts. He eventually lost the case, was denied any access to Martine until she was 18 and told that he could not apply for it again due to his past behaviour. Shortly after, her surname was changed to her stepfather's, McCutcheon. When Martine was sixteen, her mother gave birth to her half-brother, Laurence "LJ". Jenny and John eventually divorced and she married Alan Tomlin in 2000.

McCutcheon attended a nursery school in Colchester, Essex, and later the Shacklewell Infants' School in Hackney, where she performed in her first play Away in a Manger before progressing to the Shacklewell Juniors' School at the age of six, where she appeared in more plays, including Noah's Ark. At the age of five, she began attending extra dance classes and later enrolled in a dance school in Stoke Newington. Shortly before her tenth birthday, she successfully auditioned for a place at the Italia Conti Academy of Theatre Arts. However, because of the changing policy of the Inner London Education Authority (ILEA), she was no longer eligible for the grant she was supposed to receive for coming second in the audition and, with no financial support, she was forced to withdraw. Instead, she began to attend Italia Conti's Saturday lessons. Later, the Reeves Foundation, a Church of England charity based in Moorgate, offered McCutcheon a grant and she was able to enrol at the Italia Conti Academy of Theatre Arts. She finished school with nine GCSEs.

== Career ==
=== Early career ===
At the age of 12, McCutcheon obtained her first acting role and was paid £350 to appear in an American television commercial for the drink Kool-Aid, which was followed by modelling assignments and bit parts in television shows. She was given the part of Mandy in the television series Bluebirds (1989) alongside Barbara Windsor and played Susan, Jane's sister (played by Denise van Outen), in the Anthony Newley-directed production of Stop the World – I Want to Get Off, at the Churchill Theatre in Bromley, London, which was later transferred to the West End Lyric Theatre in Shaftesbury Avenue. This was followed by two guest appearances on the ITV police drama The Bill in 1991 and 1992. McCutcheon also appeared in the music video for the song "Caribbean Blue" by Irish singer Enya. By the time she was 15, she was part of an all-girl group, Milan, with two fellow pupils, and landed a record contract with Polydor and a gig touring as the warm-up act for the British boyband, East 17. Milan were reasonably successful. Three of their singles: "Is It Love You're After", "Affectionately Mine" and "Lead Me On", charted in the top ten of the dance charts, with the latter also making it to the top 100 of the UK Singles Chart. However, they were not successful enough to make a living and disbanded.

=== EastEnders ===
In 1994, McCutcheon was offered the small part of Tiffany Raymond on the popular BBC soap opera EastEnders. The role of Tiffany grew as did McCutcheon's popularity and 22 million viewers tuned in to see her final scenes in Albert Square in 1998 when her character was killed off in a special episode screened on New Year's Eve. In reality, McCutcheon had decided to leave the soap in order to embark on a pop career and the death of her character was not viewed favourably by the actress as she had intended to return. Since leaving the show, McCutcheon has publicly slammed the BBC's "Controller of Continuing Drama Series", Mal Young, who made the decision to kill her character. She accused him of treating her unfairly and bringing her role in the soap to an end so irrevocably, merely as punishment for leaving. In turn, Young has hit back at McCutcheon, saying her anger only arose because she wanted him to keep her role in EastEnders open as a "safety net", in case her pop career failed, and he was not prepared to do this.

For her portrayal of the character, she received the 1997 National Television Award for Most Popular Actress, and the 1998 TV Quick Award for Best Actress.

=== Pop career ===
McCutcheon's first appearance on the charts occurred in 1995 on a minor dance song "Are You Man Enough" with the dance producers Uno Clio. A promotional video was also produced. In 1999, she debuted as a solo pop artist with Virgin Records and scored a number one on the UK Singles Chart with the ballad "Perfect Moment" (originally recorded by Edyta Górniak in 1997). Her debut album, You Me & Us, was released that September. It peaked at number two on the UK Albums Chart and was certified platinum by the British Phonographic Industry (BPI). The album spawned two more top 10 entries, reaching number six with two singles: "I've Got You" and later with "Talking in Your Sleep", which featured the double A-side "Love Me", an album track that was re-recorded for the Children in Need appeal with all proceeds being donated to that cause. She was nominated for the Brit Award for Best Pop Act in 2000.

In 2000, McCutcheon released her second album, Wishing, which was less successful, charting at number 25 in the UK. The album spawned two singles – the number two hit "I'm Over You" and the follow-up song, a cover of the Donna Summer classic "On the Radio" which peaked at number seven. Despite peaking at only number 25, the album still managed to sell around 250,000 copies, and received a gold certification from BPI. McCutcheon released her third album, Musicality, a Broadway-influenced cover album, in 2002. It reached number 55 in the UK and was certified silver by BPI. Due to poor sales, her recording contract was cancelled and her pop career stalled. Her two-CD best-of-album called The Collection was released in September 2012.

McCutcheon returned to music in 2017 with her fourth studio album, Lost and Found, released in August by BMG. Its lead single, "Say I'm Not Alone" was released on 30 May 2017. The album peaked at number 17 in the UK, becoming McCutcheon's highest-charting record since You Me & Us.

=== Film, stage and television ===
McCutcheon regularly appears in pantomimes. She appeared in ITV's The Knock as well as the British film Kiss Kiss (Bang Bang) in 2000. She went on to play Eliza Doolittle in My Fair Lady at the National Theatre in London. Despite missing many performances (citing health problems) and withdrawing nearly five months early from the production's transfer to the Theatre Royal, Drury Lane, she won the Laurence Olivier Award for Best Actress in a Musical at the 2002 ceremony.

In 2002, McCutcheon presented the National Music Awards for ITV1 and in 2003 she featured in her only major film role. She appeared as tea-lady Natalie in the Richard Curtis romantic comedy Love Actually, where the British Prime Minister played by Hugh Grant, falls in love with McCutcheon's character. The film received positive reviews and was a box office success. McCutcheon went to America in the wake of the film's success, but a Hollywood career did not materialise. Nevertheless, she won the MTV Movie Award for Best Trans-Atlantic Breakthrough Performer and the Empire Award for Best Newcomer at the 9th Empire Awards for her performance.

In September 2005, she appeared in two episodes of BBC drama series Spooks. Screened on the UK television network ITV1 in December 2005, McCutcheon appeared in The English Harem, playing a woman in love with a Muslim man (Art Malik), who marries him, despite knowing he already has two wives. That same year, she presented and performed on ITV's entertainment programme, Moviemusic Mania. In 2007, McCutcheon was seen in two independent films, Withdrawal and Jump!, as well as the Agatha Christie's Marple television series episode "At Bertram's Hotel". She was also a judge for the second series of ITV1's Soapstar Superstar. Her appearance on the show drew criticism, with reports alleging that she was becoming a hate figure for the contestants, who were said to have found her comments relentlessly critical and at times patronising. On 8 March 2007, she performed in an Art Plus fundraising event at the Whitechapel Art Gallery opposite Natalie Press, Samantha Morton and Rhys Ifans, and in January 2008, she featured in the ITV soap Echo Beach as the character Susan Penwarden.

In September 2016, McCutcheon was announced as a panelist on the ITV daytime show Loose Women, after making a few guest appearances on the show earlier in the year.

In 2021, she competed on the second series of The Masked Singer as Swan, and was the third contestant to be unmasked.

=== Books ===
In 2000, McCutcheon released her autobiography, Who Does She Think She Is?.

In 2003, Martine McCutcheon: Behind the Scenes – A Personal Diary was published by HarperCollins.

In 2009, her first novel, The Mistress, was published by Pan MacMillan.

=== Other work ===
McCutcheon was one of many celebrities who featured in a 2004 promotional film for London's successful bid for the 2012 Summer Olympics. A fitness DVD, Martine McCutcheon: Dance Body, was released in December 2005.

In 2006, the supermarket chain Tesco announced that they would be using McCutcheon in a series of adverts to promote a new green scheme for recycling used plastic carrier bags.

From 2010 to 2011, she was the face on Danone's UK advertising campaign for its Activia yogurt brand.

== Awards and honours ==
In July 2014, she was awarded an honorary degree by the University of Bolton for her services to entertainment.

== Personal life ==
McCutcheon was engaged to DJ Gareth Cooke, but broke off the relationship in 1996. She was later in a relationship with Jonathan Barnham, by whom she became pregnant in 1999, but suffered a miscarriage in the second month. McCutcheon married singer Jack McManus at Lake Como in September 2012; the couple had been dating since 2009. On 4 February 2015, she gave birth to a son, Rafferty Jack McManus. In August 2024, McCutcheon announced that she and her husband had separated.

In 2011, McCutcheon was diagnosed with chronic fatigue syndrome (CFS), and six years later also with Lyme disease. On social media, she shares her experiences with flare-ups of fibromyalgia and how this impacts her, such as slowing down her journey with weight loss. She also has ADHD.

In 2013, she was declared bankrupt by the Kingston upon Thames County Court with creditors including HM Revenue and Customs.

== Filmography ==
Films
Year	Title	Role	Notes
1999	Martine McCutcheon: This Is My Moment	Herself	Documentary television film
2001	Kiss Kiss (Bang Bang)	Mia	
2002	Martine	Herself	Television film
2003	Love Actually	Natalie	2004 Empire Award for Best Newcomer; 2004 MTV Movie Award for Best Trans-Atlantic Breakthrough Performer
2005	The English Harem	Tracy Pringle	Television film
2006	Withdrawal	Bonnie	Short film
2008	Jump!	Liuba Halsman	
2013	The Home Office	Jane	Television film
2017	Red Nose Day Actually	Natalie	Short television film
2018	The Bromley Boys	Gertie Roberts	

Television
Year	Title	Role	Notes
1989	Bluebirds	Mandy	6 episodes
1991	The Bill	Paper Girls	Series 7, Episode 53 "Skeletons"
1992	The Bill	Amanda Jones	Series 8, Episode 57 "A Scandalous Act"
1995–1999	EastEnders	Tiffany Mitchell	364 episodes 1997 National Television Award for Most Popular Actress; 1998 TV Quick Award for Best Actress; Nominated—1999 British Soap Award for Best Exit
2000	The Knock	Jenny Foster	Series 5, Episode 2
2005	Spooks	Tash	Series 4, 2 episodes (uncredited)
2007	Agatha Christie's Marple	Jane Cooper	Series 3, Episode 1 "At Bertram's Hotel"
2007	Soapstar Superstar	Herself/Judge	Series 2
2008	Echo Beach	Susan Penwarden	Series 1, 12 episodes
2008	Moving Wallpaper	Herself	Series 1, 4 episodes (uncredited)
2008	Moving Wallpaper: The Mole	Herself	Series 1, 2 episodes (uncredited)
2012	Let's Get Gold	Herself/Judge	
2013	Midsomer Murders	Debbie Moffett	Series 15, Episode 6 "Schooled in Murder"
2016–2017	Loose Women	Herself/Panellist	Series 21
2020	Celebrity Gogglebox	Herself	Series 2, 3 episodes
2021	The Masked Singer UK	Herself/Swan	Series 2 contestant (10th place)

Video
Year	Title	Role	Notes
2005	Martine McCutcheon: Dance Body	Herself	Fitness DVD

== Discography ==
=== Studio albums ===
List of albums, with chart positions and certifications
Title	Album details	Peak chart positions				Certifications
Title	Album details	UK	UK Indie	IRE	SCO	Certifications
You Me & Us	Released: 6 September 1999; Label: Innocent, Virgin; Formats: CD, digital download	2	—	14	5	BPI: Platinum
Wishing	Released: 13 November 2000; Label: Innocent, Virgin; Formats: CD, digital download	25	—	48	37	BPI: Gold
Musicality	Released: 2 December 2002; Label: Liberty; Formats: CD, digital download	55	—	—	58	BPI: Silver
Lost and Found	Released: 11 August 2017; Label: BMG; Formats: CD, digital download	17	4	—	16	
"—" denotes album that did not chart or was not released

=== Extended plays ===
Title	Details
Home for Christmas	Released: 4 December 2020; Label: Chameleon Music Limited; Formats: digital download, streaming

=== Compilation albums ===
Title	Details
The Collection	Released: 18 September 2012; Label: Music Club Deluxe; Formats: CD, digital download

=== Singles ===
==== As lead artist ====
Title	Year	Peak chart positions				Certifications	Album
Title	Year	UK	GER	IRE	SCO	Certifications	Album
"Perfect Moment"	1999	1	100	3	1	BPI: Platinum	You Me & Us
"I've Got You"	1999	6	—	17	—		You Me & Us
"Talking in Your Sleep"/"Love Me"	1999	6	—	26	10	BPI: Silver	You Me & Us
"I'm Over You"	2000	2	—	23	3		Wishing
"On the Radio"	2001	7	—	18	6		Wishing
"Say I'm Not Alone"	2017	—	—	—	—		Lost and Found
"Any Sign of Life"	2017	—	—	—	—		Lost and Found
"Maybe I Should Run"	2017	—	—	—	—		Lost and Found
"—" denotes releases that did not chart or were not released in that territory.

==== As featured artist ====
Title	Year	Peak chart positions	Album
Title	Year	UK	Album
"Are You Man Enough" (Uno Clio featuring Martine McCutcheon)	1995	62	Non-album single

=== Other appearances ===
Title	Year	Album
"Mamma Mia"	1999	ABBAmania
"I Could Have Danced All Night"	2001	My Fair Lady (2001 London Cast Recording)
