= Beryl Cooke =

British actress (1906–2001)

- Born: 1 November 1906; Soho, London, England
- Died: 21 August 2001 (aged 94); London, England
- Occupation: Actress
- Years active: 1954–1995
- Notable work: Only Fools and Horses (1981)

Beryl Cooke (1 November 1906 – 21 August 2001) was a British actress. Her career spanned six decades; she is most familiar to British audiences as Aunt Lucy in the sitcom Happy Ever After and Mrs. Vance in the BBC drama Tenko.

== Early life ==
Cooke was born in Westminster, London on 1 November 1906.

== Career ==
Cooke made an appearance in British sitcom Only Fools and Horses, in the episode The Second Time Around, as a woman Del Boy (David Jason) and Rodney (Nicholas Lyndhurst) believe to be their Aunt Rose, only for it to emerge that the real Aunt Rose moved away some years beforehand.

== Death ==
Cooke died in London on 21 August 2001 aged 94. She is buried in East London Cemetery.

== Filmography ==
=== Film ===
Year	Title	Role	Notes
1954	Conflict of Wings	Miss Nelson	
1954	Knave of Hearts	Kind Typist	Uncredited
1954	Someone Else's Child	Miss Larner	Short film
1957	The Crooked Sky	Landlady	
1958	Them Nice Americans	Undetermined Role	Uncredited
1961	The Monster of Highgate Ponds	Miss Haggerty	
1966	The Ghost of Monk's Island	Aunt Edna	
1968	The Blood Beast Terror	Housekeeper	
1969	A Nice Girl Like Me	Bridal Gowns Assistant	Credited as Beryl Cook
1971	She'll Follow You Anywhere	Perfume Tester	
1980	High Rise Donkey	Miss Pringle	

=== Television ===
Year	Title	Role	Notes
1957	On Stage - London	Unknown	Episode: #1.2
1959	Don't Tell Father	Miss Fletcher	Episode: #1.1
1959	Emergency Ward 10	Alice Knox	Episode: #1.274
1961	Flower of Evil	Frau Elrich	Episode: "The Camp in the Mountains"
1963–1965	Compact	Mrs. Chater	162 episodes
1967	Sir Arthur Conan Doyle	Mrs. Finch	Episode: "The Black Doctor"
1967	Angel Pavement	Mrs. Pearson	2 episodes
1967	Vanity Fair	Miss Jemima	Episode: "The Famous Little Becky Puppet"
1967–1968	The Newcomers	Celia Stuart	52 episodes
1969	Mr. Digby Darling	Olive	3 episodes
1969	Out of the Unknown	Mrs. Gale	Episode: "Random Quest"
1969	Imperial Palace	Miss. Prentiss	2 episodes
1969	Jackanory	Storyteller	5 episodes
1969	The Ugliest Girl in Town	Saleslady	Episode: "The Track Star"
1970	Father, Dear Father	Mrs. Schultz	Episode: "This Is Your Wife"
1970	The Doctors	Mrs. Roache	Episode: #1.62
1970	Play for Today	Storyteller (as Beryl Cook)	Episode: "Angels Are So Few"
1971	Bless This House	Mrs. Gordon	Episode: "Another Fine Mess..."
1971	The Runaway Summer	Aunt Alice	4 episodes
1970–1971	The Troubleshooters	Miss Jenkins	7 episodes
1972	A Family at War	Cafe Manageress	Episode: "Coming Home"
1972	Villains	1st Miss Sinclair	Episode: "Move In, Move On"
1972	Public Eye	Receptionist	Episode: "Many a Slip"
1971–1973	Z Cars	Mary Brent Matron Miss Gladwell	3 episodes
1973	Emmerdale	Mavis Scott	2 episodes
1972–1973	Follyfoot	Miss Patience Headmistress	3 episodes
1973	The Dragon's Opponent	Mrs. Morden	Episode: "The Drawn Sword"
1973	Jackanory Playhouse	Fairy godmother	Episode: "The Magician's Heart"
1974	The Onedin Line	Lucy Armitage	Episode: "The Silver Caddy"
1974	Marked Personal	Dorothy Turner	2 episodes
1974	Badger's Set	Mrs. Badger	Television film
1974	No, Honestly	Aunt Augusta	Episode: "Bed, Beautiful Bed"
1974–1975	Comedy Playhouse	Aunt Lucy Molly	2 episodes
1975	Hogg's Back	Mrs. Witherspoon (as Beryl Cook)	Episode: #1.6
1974–1978	Happy Ever After	Aunt Lucy	38 episodes
1979	The Other One	Mrs. Swift	Episode: #2.1
1980	The Greeks: A Journey in Space and Time	Persian Queen	Episode: "The Greek Beginning"
1980	The Boy Who Never Was	Old Lady	Television film
1981	Only Fools and Horses	Auntie Rose	Episode: "The Second Time Around"
1982	Tenko	Mrs. Vance	Episode: "Part Three"
1985	Oliver Twist	Anny	3 episodes
1986	Fresh Fields	Winnie	Episode: "The Old Folks at Home"
1987	ScreenPlay	Lesevre	Episode: "The Trial of Klaus Barbie"
1987	Fortunes of War	Gladys Twocurry	Episode: "Greece: October 1940"
1987	Casualty	Mrs. Joyce Arthur	2 episodes
1989	The Real Eddy English	Mrs. English	4 episodes
1989	Surgical Spirit	Old Lady	Episode: "The Country, Right or Wrong"
1989	Sob Sisters	Edna (as Beryl Cook)	6 episodes
1989	The Endless Game	Second Patient	Episode: #1.1
1989	Bluebirds	Dora Jenkinson	4 episodes
1990	Chelmsford 123	Old Lady	Episode: "Ode et Amo"
1991	Taking the Floor	Old Lady 1	Episode: "In the Mood"
1991	Doctor at the Top	Mrs. Bickerstaff	Episode: "Bye Bye, Bickerstaff"
1991	A Perfect Hero	Receptionist	Episode: #1.1
1990–1992	The Bill	Mrs. Fisher Old Woman	2 episodes
1992	Love Hurts	Elderly Woman	Episode: "Charity Begins at Home"
1992	Waiting for God	Lady Resident	Episode: "Great Aunt Diana"
1993	Then Churchill Said to Me	Unknown	Episode: "Those Who Loot We Shoot"
1993	Century Falls	Miss Cooper	5 episodes
1994	Frank Stubbs	Lady Dunstable	Episode: "Charity"
1995	Health and Efficiency	Mrs. Rossi	Episode: "The Old Dope Peddler"
