= Simply Carrie =

Studio album by Carrie Lucas
- Released: 1977
- Recorded: 1977
- Genre: Soul; Disco
- Label: Soul Train Records

Carrie Lucas chronology
Simply Carrie (1977)	Street Corner Symphony (1978)

Professional ratings
Review scores
Source	Rating
Allmusic	3/5 stars

Simply Carrie is the debut studio album by American singer Carrie Lucas. Released in 1977 on the Soul Train Records label.

== Track listing ==
1. "I Gotta Keep Dancin'"
2. "Me for You"
3. "Play by Your Rule"
4. "Tender"
5. "Jammin' Tenderly (Tender, Pt. 2)"
6. "I Gotta Get Away from Your Love"
7. "I'll Close Love's Door"
8. "What's the Question"
9. "Men Kiss and Tell"

=== Album ===
Year	Album	Chart positions		Record label
Year	Album	US	US R&B	Record label
1977	Simply Carrie	183	—	Soul Train Records

=== Singles ===
Year	Single	Chart positions		
Year	Single	US	US R&B	US Dance
1977	"I Gotta Keep Dancin'"	64	44	2
