= Carrie Lucas =

American R&B musician (born 1945)

- Born: October 1, 1945 (age 81); Carmel-by-the-Sea, California, U.S.
- Origin: Los Angeles, California, U.S.
- Genres: Disco; boogie; dance; soul; R&B
- Occupation: Singer
- Instrument: Vocals
- Years active: 1977–1990
- Label: SOLAR Records
- Website: www.instagram.com/therealcarrielucas

Carrie Lucas (born October 1, 1945) is an American R&B singer, born in Carmel-by-the-Sea, California. In 1976, she was signed to Soul Train Records. Lucas released six studio albums over seven years, with Soul Train and SOLAR Records.

Lucas was married to Soul Train Records and Solar Records founder Dick Griffey, from 1974 until his death in 2010. Her daughter is Carolyn Griffey.

== Career ==
"I Gotta Keep Dancing" and "Gotta Get Away from Your Love" were the two hit singles from Lucas's first album, Simply Carrie, released in 1977. "I Gotta Keep Dancing" peaked at number 64 on the Billboard Hot 100 chart in 1977.

Lucas' second album, Street Corner Symphony, was released in 1978. It featured The Whispers as backing vocalists. A single from the LP, of the same name, was a homage to the 1960s doo-wop groups. The album was released on the record producer Dick Griffey's Solar Records label.

In 1979, Lucas released Carrie Lucas in Danceland. Griffey brought in Jody Watley (Shalamar) for background vocals, Lakeside (co-producers and backgrounds) and Walter and Wallace Scott (The Whispers) for backgrounds. Organist Kossi Gardner (1941–2009) wrote and played on the hit "Dance with You", which propelled the album to number 37 in the U.S Dance Album chart. "Dance with You" gave Lucas her only appearance in the UK Singles Chart, where it peaked at number 40 and it was later also sampled by Armand van Helden in his 1999 UK number one hit You Don't Know Me (Armand Van Helden song). 1980's Portrait of Carrie was less commercially successful, although it did spawn three modest hit singles. The first 12-inch was a reworking of her first hit, re-titled as "Keep Smilin'". This was followed by "It's Not What You Got (It's How You Use It)" and "Career Girl." Griffey shared production duties with Leon Sylvers and Gardner.

Lucas' next release, Still in Love, was released in 1982. It was recorded and released under the banner of Solar Records and distributed by Elektra/Asylum. The album produced two 12-inch singles, "Men" and the more successful "Show Me Where You're Coming From." Sheila E. co-wrote the album's title track.

Her most recent album was released in 1985. Horsin' Around spawned four 12-inch singles; "Charlie," "Horsin' Around," "Summer in the Street" and "Hello Stranger". Her cover version of Barbara Lewis' "Hello Stranger" reached number 20 on the US Billboard R&B chart.

Lucas' last known recording was an appearance on the 1990 soundtrack for Lambada: Set the Night on Fire. She performed the song "I Like the Rhythm". Lucas decided to retire from the music industry, to concentrate on married life and her horses. Carrie Lucas is the mother of Carolyn Griffey of Shalamar and Lucas Griffey.

Unidisc Records in Canada released a Greatest Hits package, which contains most of her 12-inch mixes in 1999. Carrie Lucas released her first single since 1990 on May 15, 2018. The single is "Some Things Never Change", written by Carrie Lucas and Nigel Lowis made it to number 32 of Amazon's Hot New Releases of the week. The single was released on Solar Records UK. Carrie Lucas, Carolyn Griffey, Lucas Griffey and Chinese music promoter Jessie Tsang relaunched the Solar Records and Soul Train Records in the UK. The relaunch was covered in the UK magazine Soul Survivors. Jessie Tsang is CEO with Sonia Damney as Vice President. Carrie Lucas also owns trade mark rights to Shalamar in the UK and Europe. In 2022 Carrie Lucas participated with US cable channel TV One for a special episode of the Unsung TV series on Dick Griffey and Solar Records. The episode aired on November 6 2022.

== Discography ==
=== Studio albums ===
Year	Album	Chart positions		Record label
Year	Album	US	US R&B	Record label
1977	Simply Carrie	183	—	Soul Train Records
1978	Street Corner Symphony	—	—	SOLAR
1979	Carrie Lucas in Danceland	119	37	SOLAR
1980	Portrait of Carrie	185	57	SOLAR
1982	Still in Love	80	13	SOLAR
1984	Horsin' Around	—	40	Constellation
"—" denotes a recording that did not chart or was not released in that territory.

=== Singles ===
Year	Single	Chart positions			
Year	Single	US	US R&B	US Dance	UK
1977	"I Gotta Keep Dancin'"	64	44	2	—
1979	"Dance with You"	70	27	6	40
1980	"I Gotta Keep Dancin' (Keep Smiling)"	—	—	10	—
1980	"It's Not What You Got (It's How You Use It)"	—	74	—	—
1981	"Career Girl"	—	55	—	—
1982	"Show Me Where You're Coming From"	—	23	—	—
1984	"Summer in the Street"	—	84	—	—
1985	"Hello Stranger"	—	20	—	—
"—" denotes a recording that did not chart or was not released in that territory.
