= Wishing (Martine McCutcheon album) =

Studio album by Martine McCutcheon
- Released: 13 November 2000
- Genre: Pop
- Length: 45:07
- Label: Innocent

Martine McCutcheon chronology
You Me & Us (1999)	Wishing (2000)	Musicality (2002)

Wishing is the second solo album by English actress-singer Martine McCutcheon. It was released by Innocent Records on 13 November 2000 in the United Kingdom. The album peaked at number 25 on the UK Albums Chart.

== Promotion ==
Two singles were lifted from the album, both of which charted in the top ten of the UK Singles Chart. "I'm Over You" peaked at number two in the week of 4 November 2000, while follow-up "On the Radio", a cover of the 1979 Donna Summer song, charted at number seven in February 2001. Plans for a third single were scrapped when McCutcheon won the lead role in the West End production of My Fair Lady in early 2001.

== Critical reception ==
Professional ratings
Review scores
Source	Rating
AllMusic	2/5 stars
NME	5/10

David Knights, writing for Telegraph & Argus wrote: "Hear most of these songs for the first time and you'd think Miss Minogue was behind the mike. Martine has abandoned the elegant lounge-singer image that last year gave thousands of housewives a "Perfect Moment." He felt that Wishing was" more likely to appeal to their daughters: she's taking on the likes of Britney and S Club 7 with catchy pop. Martine's voice is pretty good - better than Kylie's, certainly - and the songs are diverse. All in all, a good pop album."

AllMusic editor John Lucas remarked that Wishing "largely abandons the mid-tempo balladry which pushed her debut album past platinum sales in the U.K., opting for the kind of light disco pop that the likes of Kylie Minogue and Louise excel at [...] The majority of this album is bland and forgettable. McCutcheon remains a gifted singer, but her talents are wasted on this dull material." Arwa Haider from NME called the album a "disappointing underachievement" and wrote: "Martine’s music is probably intended to sound dreamy. Unfortunately, this is another listless effort – as if her 1999 debut You, Me & Us wasn’t sufficiently anodyne. And it’s not as though Martine can’t sing; her vocals are competent, if rather too given to schmaltz. The problem is, for an artist in her mid-twenties, she’s apparently oblivious to the fact that her music sounds so fusty."

== Commercial performance ==
Wishing debuted and peaked at number 25 on the UK Albums Chart in the week ending 25 November 2000. This was a considerable decline from her previous effort You Me & Us, which had opened at number two the year before. On 1 December 2000, the album was certified both silver and gold by the British Phonographic Industry (BPI).

== Track listing ==
Wishing track listing
No.	Title	Writer(s)	Producer(s)	Length
1.	"I'm Over You"	Carl Sturken; Evan Rogers	Sturken; Rogers	3:43
2.	"Tonight"	Martine McCutcheon; Gil Cang; James McMillan	Quiet Money	3:31
3.	"Teardrops"	Christina Undhjem; James Reynolds; Lars Halvor Jensen; Martin M. Larsson	Quiet Money	3:54
4.	"On the Radio"	Donna Summer; Giorgio Moroder	John Poppo	3:50
5.	"Every Time"	Michelle Escoffery; Ray Ruffin; Rose Stone	Ray Ruffin	3:38
6.	"Love Changes Nothing"	Rogers; Simon Darlow	Ruffin	3:25
7.	"You Mean the World to Me"	McCutcheon; Cang; McMillan	Quiet Money	3:34
8.	"What You See Is What You Get"	Undhjem; Steve Pigott; Jensen; Larsson	Greg Fitzgerald	4:28
9.	"Wishing"	McCutcheon; Cang; McMillan	Quiet Money	3:46
10.	"Cried So Many Nights"	McCutcheon; Ben Barson; Stone	Ruffin	4:33
11.	"Together We Are Beautiful"	Ken Leray	Andy Bradfield	3:10
12.	"Everybody"	McCutcheon; Cang; McMillan	Quiet Money	3:41
Total length:				45:07

== Charts ==
=== Weekly charts ===
Weekly performance for Wishing
Chart (2000)	Peak position
Irish Albums (IRMA)	48
Scottish Albums (OCC)	37
UK Albums (OCC)	25

=== Year-end charts ===
Year-end performance for Wishing
Chart (2000)	Position
UK Albums (OCC)	73

== Certifications ==
Certifications for Wishing
Region	Certification	Certified units/sales
United Kingdom (BPI)	Gold	100,000^{^}
^{^} Shipments figures based on certification alone.
