= Horsin' Around =

Studio album by Carrie Lucas
- Released: August 8, 1984
- Recorded: January–April 1984
- Genres: R&B; soul
- Label: Constellation
- Producers: Stephen Shockley; Barry De Vorzon; Joseph Conlan; Bill Wolfer; Fenderella; Bill Simmons; Jeffery Cooper

Carrie Lucas chronology
Still in Love (1982)	Horsin' Around (1984)

Singles from Horsin' Around
- 1. "Summer in the Street" Released: 1984; 2. "Charlie" Released: 1984; 3. "Goin' in Circles" Released: 1984; 4. "Hello Stranger" Released: 1985

Professional ratings
Review scores
Source	Rating
AllMusic	2/5 stars

Horsin' Around is the sixth and final studio album by American R&B singer Carrie Lucas, released on August 8, 1984 by Constellation Records. Eddie Murphy has a cameo on the title track.

== Track listing ==
Side one

1. "Summer in the Street" – 6:00
2. "Charlie" – 5:18
3. "Goin' in Circles" – 4:30
4. "Horsin' Around" – 4:30

Side two

5. "Hello Stranger" – 5:50
6. "Let's Keep Dancing" – 5:57
7. "Somebody Said" – 3:24
8. "Superstar" – 4:40

== Charts ==
Chart (1984)	Peak position
US Top R&B/Hip-Hop Albums (Billboard)	40

=== Singles ===
Year	Single	Chart positions
Year	Single	US R&B
1985	"Hello Stranger"	20
