= 3rd National Television Awards =

British awards ceremony in 1997

- Date: 8 October 1997
- Location: Royal Albert Hall, London
- Country: United Kingdom
- Presented by: Various
- Hosted by: Trevor McDonald
- Website: http://www.nationaltvawards.com/

Television/radio coverage
- Network: ITV

The 3rd National Television Awards ceremony was held at the Royal Albert Hall on 8 October 1997 and was hosted by Trevor McDonald.

== Awards ==
Category	Winner	Also nominated
Most Popular Actor	David Jason (A Touch of Frost)	George Clooney (ER); Robson Green (Reckless); Ross Kemp (EastEnders); Paul Nicholls (EastEnders)
Most Popular Actress	Martine McCutcheon (EastEnders)	Gillian Anderson (The X-Files); Pam Ferris (Where The Heart Is); Claire King (Emmerdale); Lisa Riley (Emmerdale)
Most Popular Drama	Reckless (ITV)	A Touch of Frost (ITV); ER (Channel 4/NBC); London's Burning (ITV)
Most Popular Serial Drama	EastEnders (BBC One)	Neighbours (BBC One/Network Ten); Emmerdale (ITV); Family Affairs (Channel 5); Brookside (Channel 4); Coronation Street (ITV); Home and Away (ITV/Seven Network)
Most Popular Talk Show	Des O'Connor Tonight (ITV)	The Clive James Show (ITV); The Mrs Merton Show (BBC Two); Ricki Lake (Channel 4/Syndicated)
Most Popular Entertainment Programme	An Evening With Lily Savage (ITV)	Noel's House Party (BBC One); Shooting Stars (BBC Two); Stars in Their Eyes (ITV)
Most Popular Entertainment Presenter	Michael Barrymore	Shane Richie; Dale Winton; Lily Savage
Most Popular Factual Programme	Animal Hospital (BBC One)	Antiques Roadshow (BBC One); Police Camera Action! (ITV); Ready Steady Cook (BBC Two)
Most Popular Quiz Programme	They Think It's All Over (BBC One)	Have I Got News for You (BBC Two); Strike It Rich (ITV); Countdown (Channel 4)
Most Popular Comedy Programme	Only Fools and Horses (BBC One)	Birds of a Feather (BBC One); Friends (Channel 4/NBC); Men Behaving Badly (BBC One)
Most Popular Comedy Performer	David Jason (Only Fools and Horses)	Rowan Atkinson (The Thin Blue Line); Harry Enfield (Harry Enfield and Chums); Nicholas Lyndhurst (Only Fools and Horses); Pauline Quirke (Birds of a Feather)
Most Popular Newcomer	Matthew Marsden (Coronation Street)	Rebecca Callard (The Grand); Tina Hobley (Coronation Street); Jonathan Kerrigan (Casualty); Ben Unwin (Home and Away)
Most Popular Children's Programme	Blue Peter (BBC One)	Hollyoaks (Channel 4); The Simpsons (BBC Two/Fox); Top of the Pops (BBC One)
Most Popular Advert	W H Smith (Airport)	Nike (Good v Evil); Rolo (Elephant); Safeway (Harry and Molly)
Most Popular Daytime Programme	Can't Cook, Won't Cook (BBC One)	Supermarket Sweep (ITV); This Morning (ITV); Vanessa (ITV)
Special Recognition Award	Robson Green	
