= Yvonne Elliman (album) =

Studio album by Yvonne Elliman
- Released: 1972
- Studio: A&R Studios, AIR Studios
- Genre: Pop, pop rock
- Label: Decca
- Producer: Tim Rice, Andrew Lloyd Webber

Yvonne Elliman chronology
Yvonne Elliman (1972)	Food of Love (1973)

Professional ratings
Review scores
Source	Rating
Christgau's Record Guide	C+

Yvonne Elliman is the debut album by American pop music star Yvonne Elliman, recorded and released in 1972 on Decca Records. It was produced by Andrew Lloyd Webber and Tim Rice, for Qwertyuiop Productions, and features the single "I Don't Know How To Love Him".

It also features covers of "Can't Find My Way Home" by Blind Faith, Nothing Rhymed by Raymond O'Sullivan, better known as his stage name, Gilbert O'Sullivan, "World In Changes" and "Look At You, Look At Me" both by Dave Mason, "I Would Have Had A Good Time" by John Kongos, "Speak Your Mind" by Marc Benno and "Sugar Babe" by Stephen Stills.

== Track listing ==
1. "Look At You, Look at Me" (Dave Mason) 4:12
2. "I Would Have Had a Good Time" (John Kongos) 4:01
3. "Can't Find My Way Home" (Steve Winwood) 3:09
4. "Everyday of My Life" (David Spinozza) 3:50
5. "I Don't Know How To Love Him" (Tim Rice, Andrew Lloyd Webber) 3:32
6. "Sugar Babe" (Stephen Stills) 4:19
7. "Nothing Rhymed" (Gilbert O'Sullivan) 3:36
8. "World in Changes" (Dave Mason) 3:40
9. "Interlude for Johnny" (Yvonne Elliman) 2:01
10. "Speak Your Mind" (Marc Benno) 4:35
11. "Heat" (Bruce Epstein) 2:53

== Personnel ==
- Vocals, acoustic guitar: Yvonne Elliman
- Acoustic guitar, harmonica: Hugh McCracken
- Acoustic guitar: Bruce Epstein, Louis Stewart, Mark Warner, David Spinozza
- Bass guitar: Alan Weighall, Stu Woods
- Keyboards: Kenneth Ascher, George Butcher, Peter Robinson
- Drums: Rick Marotta, Bruce Rowland
- Percussion: Ralph MacDonald
- Horns: Albert A. Delmonte, Peter Gordon, Dominick J. Monardo
- Flute: George Young
- Strings: Alfred V. Brown, Barbara Hunter Coke, Lewis Eley, Max Ellen, David Nadien, Gene Orloff, Tony Posk
- Backing Vocals: Hilda Harris, Linda November, Maeretha Stewart
