= Jack McManus (singer) =

British musician

- McManus performing at Middlesbrough Music Live in 2008

Background information
- Genres: Pop, pop rock
- Occupations: Singer, songwriter
- Instruments: Vocals, guitar, piano
- Label: Polydor
- Spouse: Martine McCutcheon (m. 2012; sep. 2024)
- Website: JackMcManus.co.uk

Jack Michael McManus is an English singer-songwriter from Bromley. From 2012 to 2024 he was married to actress and singer Martine McCutcheon.

McManus' debut album Either Side Of Midnight was released on Polydor Records in 2008, preceded by his first single "Bang on the Piano". McManus has toured with acts such as Scouting for Girls, Amy MacDonald and Sam Sparro.

== Personal life ==
McManus married actress-singer Martine McCutcheon in September 2012. Together they have one child. In August 2024 McCutcheon announced that she and McManus had separated.

== Discography ==
=== Albums ===
- 2008 – Either Side of Midnight – No. 22 UK

=== Singles ===
- 2008 – "Bang on the Piano" – No. 21 NL, No. 45 UK
- 2008 – "You Think I Don't Care"
- 2010 – "Heart Attack"

=== As featured artist ===
| Year | Song | Artist | Album |
|---|---|---|---|
2014
| 2014 | "Freedom" | Afrojack & D-Wayne (feat. Jack McManus) | Forget the World |
| 2014 | "Three Strikes" | Afrojack (feat. Jack McManus) | Forget the World |
