= Love Me (Yvonne Elliman album) =

Studio album by Yvonne Elliman
- Released: 1977
- Studios: Total Experience Recording Studios (Hollywood, California) United Western Recorders (Los Angeles, California)
- Genres: Rock; pop rock
- Label: RSO
- Producer: Freddie Perren

Yvonne Elliman chronology
Rising Sun (1975)	Love Me (1977)	Night Flight (1978)

Love Me is the fourth album by American pop star Yvonne Elliman, produced by Freddie Perren and released by RSO Records in 1977. This album features a cover of Barbara Lewis' tune, "Hello Stranger", the title cut, which is another cover of the Bee Gees' tune, and "I Can't Get You Outa My Mind".

== Track listing ==
1. "Love Me" (Barry Gibb, Robin Gibb)
2. "Hello Stranger" (Barbara Lewis)
3. "I Can't Get You Outa My Mind" (Beatrice Verdi, Chris Yarian)
4. "I Know" (Yvonne Elliman)
5. "Without You (There Ain't No Love at All)" (Beatrice Verdi, Chris Yarian)
6. "Good Sign" (Carole Bayer Sager, David Wolfert, Melissa Manchester)
7. "She'll Be the Home" (Beatrice Verdi, Chris Yarian)
8. "(I Don't Know Why) I Keep Hanging On" (Beatrice Verdi, Chris Yarian)
9. "I'd Do It Again" (Beatrice Verdi, Chris Yarian, Gary Lohman)
10. "Uphill (Peace of Mind)" (Frederick Knight)

== Personnel ==
- Yvonne Elliman – vocals, guitar
- Bob "Boogie" Bowles, Gary Starbuck – guitar
- Scott Edwards – bass guitar
- Freddie Perren, John Barnes – keyboards, percussion
- Paulinho da Costa, Bob Zimmitti, Gary Coleman – percussion
- James Gadson – drums
- David Blumberg, Don Peake, Sam Brown III, Wade Marcus – string and horn arrangements
