= On the Radio (Donna Summer song) =

1979 single by Donna Summer

- A-side label of the US single

Single by Donna Summer

from the album On the Radio: Greatest Hits Volumes I & II and Foxes (soundtrack)
- B-side: "There Will Always Be a You"
- Released: November 23, 1979
- Studio: Rusk Sound, Westlake Audio (Los Angeles); Burbank (Burbank, California); Allen Zentz (Hollywood, California); Record Plant (New York City)
- Genre: Disco
- Length: 4:05
- Label: Casablanca
- Songwriters: Donna Summer; Giorgio Moroder
- Producer: Giorgio Moroder

Donna Summer singles chronology
"No More Tears (Enough Is Enough)" (1979)	"On the Radio" (1979)	"Sunset People" (1980)

"On the Radio" is a song by American singer-songwriter Donna Summer, produced by Italian musician Giorgio Moroder, and released in late 1979 on the Casablanca record label. It was written for the soundtrack to the film Foxes and inspired the title of Summer's first international compilation album On the Radio: Greatest Hits Volumes I & II.

== History ==
The song was released in three formats: the radio 45 rpm single; the 5+ minute version included on Summer's Greatest Hits double album package, and a DJ Promo 7+ minute version released on 12-inch single (and included on the Foxes film soundtrack album). This last version was later released on the Bad Girls CD digipack double CD release. The Foxes soundtrack also includes an instrumental version of the song in a ballad tempo and crediting Moroder as a solo artist. In the film, the ballad tempo and the disco version are both heard with Donna Summer's vocals. Donna Summer performed "On the Radio" on television shows such as American Bandstand.

== Commercial performance ==
"On the Radio" was released as a single and became, in February 1980, her tenth top-ten hit in the U.S. as well as her eighth and final consecutive top-five single. "On the Radio" peaked at number five on the Billboard Hot 100 and number nine on the soul chart. The song was also Summer's 14th entry on the Billboard Disco chart, where it peaked at number eight. In Canada, it peaked at number two.

== Official versions ==
- "On the Radio" (single version) – 4:00
- "On the Radio" (On the Radio: Greatest Hits Vol. 1 & 2: long version) – 5:50
- "On the Radio" (Foxes soundtrack and 12-inch single version) – 7:34
- "On the Radio" (piano instrumental version from Foxes soundtrack) – 4:27

== Personnel ==
- All vocals and lyrics by Donna Summer
- Music written by Giorgio Moroder and Donna Summer
- Produced by Giorgio Moroder

== Charts ==
=== Weekly charts ===
1980 weekly chart performance for "On the Radio"
Chart (1980)	Peak position
Australia (Kent Music Report)	36
Belgium (Ultratop 50 Flanders)	25
Canada Adult Contemporary (RPM)	1
Canada Top Singles (RPM)	2
France (SNEP)	34
Ireland (IRMA)	18
Netherlands (Dutch Top 40)	20
Netherlands (Single Top 100)	27
New Zealand (Recorded Music NZ)	32
Norway (VG-lista)	6
Peru (Rádio Panamericana)	3
Portugal (Musica & Som)	10
Spain Airplay (Los 40)	9
UK Singles (Official Charts)	32
US Adult Contemporary (Billboard)	26
US Dance Club Songs (Billboard)	8
US Billboard Hot 100	5
US Hot R&B/Hip-Hop Songs (Billboard)	9
US Cash Box Top 100	4
West Germany (GfK)	34

2012 weekly chart performance for "On the Radio"
Chart (2012)	Peak position
France (SNEP)	97

=== Year-end charts ===
Year-end chart performance for "On the Radio"
Chart (1980)	Position
Australia (Kent Music Report)	180
Canada Top Singles (RPM)	23
US Billboard Hot 100	52
US Cash Box Top 100	46

== Certifications and sales ==
Certifications for "On the Radio"
Region	Certification	Certified units/sales
United States (RIAA)	Platinum	2,000,000^{^}
^{^} Shipments figures based on certification alone.

== Martine McCutcheon version ==
"On the Radio"

Single by Martine McCutcheon

from the album Wishing
- B-side: "It's All Over Again"
- Released: January 22, 2001
- Length: 3:49
- Label: Innocent; Virgin
- Songwriters: Giorgio Moroder; Donna Summer
- Producer: John Poppo

Martine McCutcheon singles chronology
"I'm Over You" (2000)	"On the Radio" (2001)	"Say I'm Not Alone" (2017)

English actress Martine McCutcheon covered "On the Radio" and released it as the second single from her second album, Wishing (2000), on January 22, 2001. Her version was produced by John Poppo. Although it became McCutcheon's fifth consecutive top-10 hit on the UK Singles Chart, peaking at number seven, it was her last single to appear within the top 100, and it would remain her last single release until 2017's "Say I'm Not Alone". In Ireland, "On the Radio" reached number 18, matching the peak of the original.

=== Track listings ===
UK CD1

1. "On the Radio" (radio mix) – 3:49
2. "It's All Over Again" – 4:42
3. "On the Radio" (Pants & Corset radio edit) – 3:33
4. "On the Radio" (video) – 3:45

UK CD2

1. "On the Radio" (radio mix) – 3:49
2. "On the Radio" (Pants & Corset club mix) – 7:33
3. "On the Radio" (Robbie Rivera's vocal mix) – 7:35

UK cassette single

A1. "On the Radio" (radio mix) – 3:49
A2. "On the Radio" (Almighty radio edit) – 4:14
B1. "On the Radio" (Pants & Corset radio edit) – 3:33

=== Charts ===
==== Weekly charts ====
Weekly chart performance for "On the Radio"
Chart (2001)	Peak position
Europe (Eurochart Hot 100)	32
Ireland (IRMA)	18
Scottish Singles Sales (Official Charts)	6
UK Singles (Official Charts)	7

==== Year-end charts ====
Year-end chart performance for "On the Radio"
Chart (2001)	Position
UK Singles (OCC)	145
