= Moment by Moment =

1978 film by Jane Wagner

- Theatrical release poster
- Directed by: Jane Wagner
- Screenplay by: Jane Wagner
- Produced by: Robert Stigwood
- Starring: Lily Tomlin; John Travolta
- Cinematography: Phillip Lathrop
- Edited by: La Reine Johnston
- Music by: Lee Holdridge
- Production company: RSO Records
- Distributed by: Universal Pictures
- Release date: December 22, 1978
- Running time: 105 minutes
- Country: United States
- Language: English
- Budget: $8 million
- Box office: $11 million

Moment by Moment is a 1978 American romantic drama film written and directed by Jane Wagner, and starring Lily Tomlin and John Travolta. It was released by Universal Pictures on December 22, 1978.

Shot in Malibu, California from April to July 1978, it marked the end of Travolta's three-film contract with producer Robert Stigwood following Saturday Night Fever (1977) and Grease (1978).

== Synopsis ==
Trisha Rawlings is a wealthy middle-aged Beverly Hills socialite suffering from loneliness following a separation from her philandering husband, Stu. At a pharmacy, she meets Vick "Strip" Harrison, a suave young drifter whom she had briefly met in the recent past when he worked as a car valet. He becomes infatuated with her, follows her to her Malibu beach house, hangs around despite her cold demeanor, and offers her pills in an attempt to woo her.

Trisha is initially annoyed by Strip's flirtation but eventually reciprocates his affections, although not to the same degree. They have lunch, officially marking the beginning of their rocky relationship. She enjoys spending time with him, but the age and class differences make her feel ashamed.

When they attend a photography exhibition together, they run into Stu, which makes the situation uncomfortable. After they return home, they argue over their relationship. Strip leaves, but Trisha tracks him down and they reconcile.

== Cast ==
- Lily Tomlin as Trisha Rawlings
- John Travolta as Strip Harrison
- Andra Akers as Naomi
- Bert Kramer as Stu Rawlings
- Shelley R. Bonus as Peg
- Debra Feuer as Stacie
- James Luisi as Dan Santini
- John O'Leary as Pharmacist
- Neil Flanagan as Storekeeper
- Jarvais Hudson as Gas Station Attendant
- Tom Slocum as Band Leader
- Michael Consoldane as Hotel Desk Clerk
- Jo Jordan as Bookstore Lady
- Joseph Schwab as Druggest
- Stan Rodarte as Dancer in Bar (uncredited)

== Production ==
John Travolta and Lily Tomlin were both at the height of their careers when they were cast. Universal Pictures purchased the film rights from producer Robert Stigwood for $8 million, believing that the star power of both leads would draw audiences. The film was the first directed by Jane Wagner, Tomlin's writer and collaborator, and later wife. However, during production Universal raised concerns about Wagner and hired Saturday Night Fever director of photography Ralf D. Bode to assist with direction, although he is credited in the film as a technical advisor. Stigwood attempted to have Wagner fired. but met resistance from Travolta and Tomlin.

During production, a Los Angeles magazine reported: "The chemistry between Tomlin and Travolta began to rival that between Menachem Begin and Yassar Arafat". A crew staff was also quoted as saying: "Two weeks into the shooting on location in Malibu, there was nobody on the set that didn't know we were in the middle of a turkey. It was like being on the voyage of the damned". Two years after its release, Lily Tomlin said of the experience: "John and I were totally unprepared. We thought it was a sweet, small, lightly funny movie. We were not prepared for what others thought. It's the one thing that all performers live in fear of—total failure. And when it happens and you survive, I think you're probably in a much better place. It's made me less cautious. It made me place more importance on the experience of working with other artists than on the reaction of critics or the public".

Years later, Wagner said of the experience: "It isn’t enough to know the aesthetics of movie-making. You have to know the mechanics, too. I didn’t. I couldn’t handle the crew. I had to cut 30 pages out of the script. When Lily chose to play the character depressed, I went with her, even though playing depression is not interesting. Panic began to set in when I saw the rushes at night and knew they were not good, but that I’d have to go on with the next day’s shooting anyway. I felt increasingly helpless. I’m not good at dealing with people. I’m much too subjective. I’m always surprised when writers become good directors".

== Soundtrack ==
Moment by Moment: The Original Soundtrack from the Motion Picture

Soundtrack album by various artists
- Released: January 1979
- Recorded: 1978
- Genres: Pop, easy listening
- Length: 43:15
- Label: RSO Records
- Producer: Bill Oakes (Music Supervisor)

Singles from Moment by Moment
- 1. "Moment by Moment" Released: December 1978

Moment by Moment: The Original Soundtrack from the Motion Picture was released on vinyl, cassette tape and 8-track tape by RSO Records in January 1979. Despite the film's poor reputation, its title song was a modest hit for singer Yvonne Elliman.

Side 1:

1. "Moment by Moment" (Yvonne Elliman) – 3:15
2. "The Lady Wants To Know" (Michael Franks) – 4:32
3. "Everybody Needs Love" (Stephen Bishop) – 3:40
4. "Moment by Moment Theme (Reprise – Instrumental)" (Lee Holdridge) – 1:07
5. "You Know I Love You" (Charles Lloyd) – 3:25
6. "Sometimes When We Touch" (Dan Hill) – 4:03

Side 2:

1. "Moment by Moment (Main Theme – Instrumental)" (Lee Holdridge) – 2:57
2. "For You and I" (10cc) – 5:20
3. "Hollywood Boulevard (Instrumental)" (Ray Parker Jr.) – 3:34
4. "Your Heart Never Lies" (Charles Lloyd) – 5:07
5. "Moment by Moment ("On the Beach" – Instrumental)" (Lee Holdridge & John Klemmer) – 2:15
6. "Moment by Moment (Reprise) Film Version" (Yvonne Elliman) – 4:00

=== Charts ===
Album

Title	Chart (1979)	Peak position
"Moment by Moment"	US Billboard 200 Bubbling Under	202

Single

Title	Chart (1978–79)	Peak position
"Moment by Moment"	US Billboard Hot 100	59
"Moment by Moment"	US Billboard Adult Contemporary	32

== Novelization ==
A paperback novelization of the screenplay was written by Darcy O'Brien and published by Ballantine Books in January 1979 as a promotional tie-in.

== Critical response ==
Moment by Moment was widely panned by critics and moviegoers.

Vincent Canby of The New York Times wrote: "It's very difficult to understand what Miss Tomlin and Jane Wagner, who wrote and directed the film, wanted to do in Moment by Moment. As romantic drama it's pretty tepid. That the two stars look enough alike to be brother and sister is no help, and though Miss Wagner's camera comes in for some tactful close-ups of flesh in the love scenes, they are singularly unerotic. One has the impression that these two lovers would prefer to be doing something else".

Variety wrote that the film "has to rate as one of the major disappointments of 1978. What seemed like inspired casting on paper, the teaming of John Travolta and Lily Tomlin, fails badly in execution".

Gene Siskel awarded the film 1.5 stars out of 4 and called it "a thoroughly awkward, frequently laughable love story that Travolta would do well not to defend, but to simply forget and move on to his next project. Chalk it up to working with the wrong people at the wrong time". Roger Ebert said on their TV show that the movie wasn't just bad, it was a "disaster".

Gary Arnold of The Washington Post wrote: "The circumscribed nature of Jane Wagner's screenplay and the hazy nature of her direction tend to divorce the film from any semblance of reality, both social and erotic. For all practical purposes Moment by Moment is a two-character idyll, concentrated at a location—the heroine's Malibu Colony beachhouse—that seems imaginary".

Gilbert Adair of The Monthly Film Bulletin stated: "Critics are fond of attributing a film's badness to some hypothetical computer; this truly terrible movie might have been made by HAL in his most maudlin 'Bicycle-built-for-two' mood, as the plugs were being pulled out".

Kevin Thomas of the Los Angeles Times was more positive in his review: "There have been many complaints that there is a lack of chemistry between the stars and that their dialogue is banal in the utmost ... Yet for those of us who respond to the intense concern Wagner projects for Tomlin and Travolta, there actually is chemistry between them and what they have to say to each other sounds lifelike rather than merely trite. At any rate, Tomlin and Travolta clearly have trusted in Wagner completely, giving themselves entirely to their roles, with Tomlin underplaying to Travolta's engaging projection of vulnerability".

The New Yorker did not review the film at the time of release but, in 2019, New Yorker critic Richard Brody wrote a positive defense of the film, labeling it as one with "a tonal ambiguity to the bumptious romantic pursuit that follows, a surprisingly tremulous and fragile air, which may be what dismayed critics who were expecting a more conventional drama".

Moment by Moment holds a 20% rating on Rotten Tomatoes based on ten reviews.

== Legacy ==
The film has found popularity with some for its camp value, and the producers of Mystery Science Theater 3000 unsuccessfully attempted to obtain the rights to broadcast and mock the film on their show.

== Release ==
Kino Lorber released the film on DVD and Blu-ray on August 24, 2021. The release includes an audio commentary, radio spots and a theatrical trailer.
