= Street Corner Symphony (album) =

Studio album by Carrie Lucas
- Released: 1978
- Recorded: 1978
- Genre: Soul; Disco
- Label: SOLAR Records

Carrie Lucas chronology
Simply Carrie (1977)	Street Corner Symphony (1978)	Carrie Lucas in Danceland (1979)

Professional ratings
Review scores
Source	Rating
AllMusic	2/5 stars

Street Corner Symphony is the second studio album by American singer Carrie Lucas. Released in 1978 on the SOLAR Records label.

== Track listing ==
1. "Street Corner Symphony" 6:12
2. "But My Heart Says No" 4:02
3. "Tic Toc" 4:17
4. "The Depths of My Soul" 3:38
5. "The Edge of Night" 6:13
6. "Questions" 5:19
7. "Simpler Days" 3:42
8. "Reflections" 1:17
9. "Street Corner Symphony (12 Version)" 6:12
10. "Tic Toc (12 Version)" 5:03
