= Hello Stranger (song) =

1963 single by Barbara Lewis

Single by Barbara Lewis

from the album Hello Stranger
- B-side: "Think a Little Sugar"
- Released: March 1963
- Recorded: January 1963
- Genre: R&B; soul
- Length: 2:42
- Label: Atlantic
- Songwriter: Barbara Lewis
- Producer: Ollie McLaughlin

Barbara Lewis singles chronology
"My Mama Told Me" (1962)	"Hello Stranger" (1963)	"Straighten Up Your Heart" (1963)

"Hello Stranger"

Single by Yvonne Elliman

from the album Love Me
- B-side: "She'll Be the Home"
- Released: March 1977
- Recorded: 1976
- Genre: Pop
- Length: 3:09
- Label: RSO
- Songwriter: Barbara Lewis
- Producer: Freddie Perren

Yvonne Elliman singles chronology
"Love Me" (1976)	"Hello Stranger" (1977)	"I Can't Get You Outa My Mind" (1977)

"Hello Stranger" is a 1963 hit single by American singer Barbara Lewis, that spent two weeks at number one on the R&B singles chart in Billboard, crossing over to #3 on the pop chart.

== Original version ==
"Hello Stranger" was written by Barbara Lewis herself. She was inspired to write a song with that title while working gigs in Detroit with her musician father: “I would make the circuit with my dad and people would yell out: ‘Hey stranger, hello stranger, it’s been a long time’." The song is notable because its title comprises the first two words of the lyrics but is never repeated at any point in the rest of the song.

Lewis recorded "Hello Stranger" at Chess Studios in Chicago in January 1963. The track's producer, Ollie McLaughlin, recruited the Dells to provide the background vocals. The arrangement by Riley Hampton, who was then working with Etta James, features a signature organ riff provided by John Young. The track was completed after thirteen takes. Lewis recalled that, on hearing the playback of the finished track, Dells member Chuck Barksdale "kept jumping up and down and saying, ‘It’s a hit, it’s a hit.’...I didn’t really know. It was all new to me.”

McLaughlin flew to New York City to pitch "Hello Stranger" to Atlantic Records, which had picked up Lewis' previous two singles for national release. Atlantic optioned "Hello Stranger", but then had second thoughts about releasing such an unusual track. The ascent of "Our Day Will Come" by Ruby & the Romantics to the top of the pop and R&B charts in March 1963 motivated Atlantic to release "Hello Stranger" that month. It entered the Billboard Hot 100 in April 1963, but took another month to reach the Top 40. Impelled by its #1 status in St. Louis, Missouri, it entered the Billboard Top Ten that June for a five-week stay.

== Yvonne Elliman's cover version ==
The most successful version of "Hello Stranger" since the original was by Yvonne Elliman, whose version was produced by Freddie Perren for Elliman's 1977 album Love Me. Elliman said, "'Hello Stranger' has been my favorite song since I was ten years old".... "When Freddie asked me what I wanted to sing, 'Hello Stranger' was the first thing that came out of my mouth.... He said: 'Oh God, yeah. I love that song'." Both Elliman and Perren deliberately sought to capture the sound of the original. "Hello Stranger" was released as the follow-up single to Elliman's #14 hit "Love Me" and was similarly successful on the Pop charts, reaching #15 in the spring of 1977; Elliman's "Hello Stranger" also charted R&B at #57 and was most successful on the Easy Listening chart where it was #1 for four weeks.

Elliman's "Hello Stranger" was also released as a single in the UK; despite the precedent "Love Me" having reached #6, "Hello Stranger" was much less successful reaching #26. In the UK "Hello Stranger" did not have the cachet of being the remake of a "golden oldie" as the Barbara Lewis original was overlooked both in its 1963 UK release on London Records and in a 1968 reissue on Atlantic with Lewis' hit "Baby I'm Yours" on the flip side.

Yvonne Elliman did take "Hello Stranger" into the Top 20 in the Netherlands (#20) and also New Zealand (#12). In the US, Elliman's version went to #1 on the Easy Listening chart and number fifteen on the Billboard Hot 100.

== Other versions ==
The song has been covered by many other artists. One of the earliest covers was by Martha Reeves & the Vandellas that same year from their 1963 album Heat Wave.

Elkie Brooks, whose first single, released in 1964, featured a version of "Hello Stranger" on the flip side of her version of another U.S. R&B hit, Etta James's "Something's Got a Hold on Me".

In 1966, Ollie McLaughlin had the group the Capitols, discovered at a local dance headlined by Barbara Lewis, record "Hello Stranger" to be the B-side of their #7 hit "Cool Jerk".

Also in 1966, an instrumental version was released as an alternative B-side to Deon Jackson's "Love Makes The World Go Round" on Carla 2526. Although it is billed as by Deon Jackson, it is rumoured to be by Riley Hampton, who was the arranger of the song in 1963.

"Hello Stranger" was also a 1969 single release by Darius before returning to the charts in 1973 when it became a regional hit for Fire & Rain, a folk rock duo comprising veteran Tucson musician Manny Freiser and Patti McCarron, Freiser's then-wife who sang lead; their version, which featured Michael Omartian on keyboards, was arranged by Ben Benay who also played guitar. Benay had also been guitarist on the version of "Hello Stranger" by Darius.

Manny Freiser recalled: "Mercury [Records] released "Hello Stranger" as a single against our wishes. It became a legitimate hit at easy listening radio...Mercury then tried to cross it over to Top-40 radio...We started picking up major markets, mostly in the southeast...The single precariously "bubbled under the Hot 100" on Billboard's charts in spring '73: #106 one week, #105 the next, and so on" entering the Billboard Hot 100 that June at #100 where it remained for three weeks and then dropped off the charts. Freiser - "Although it had sold 70,000+ copies, 'Hello Stranger' had basically been a 'turntable hit' at Top 40 radio -- one that got played a lot [sic], but didn't break. It thus became Billboard Magazine's lowest-ranked Hot 100 single of 1973, ranking #573 out of 573 singles that made the Hot 100."

In October 1976, studio group New York Rubber Rock Band recorded a dance version of "Hello Stranger" for the Brooklyn-based Henry Street Records; Colleen Heather was the vocalist on this version which reached #31 on the Dance charts.

The Capitols' version of "Hello Stranger" was also issued in the UK as the B-side of "Cool Jerk" three times: in 1966, 1969 and 1971 (the last two reissues credited to the Three Caps) with the single falling short of the charts each time.

In 1985, Carrie Lucas' remake of "Hello Stranger" - which featured the Whispers - was a Top 20 R&B hit. It was included on her 1984 album Horsin' Around.

The Supremes & The Four Tops recorded a version for the album Dynamite! in 1971.

In 1977, the song was covered by Hong Kong female singer May Cheng 鄭寶雯 on a compilation LP album 《House Golden Hits 1977 Volume 5》.

Other versions of the song have been recorded by Martha Reeves and the Vandellas for their Heat Wave album, by Queen Latifah in 2004 for her The Dana Owens Album, by Ebony Alleyne for her album Never Look Back (recorded in 2003/ released in 2007), by Diane Marino (featuring saxophonist Wycliffe Gordon) for her 2008 '60s covers album Just Groovin', by Julia Holter for her 2013 album Loud City Song, and by Samantha Fish on her 2017 album Chills & Fever.

Single Versions
Artist	Year	Recording info	Chart position
Barbara Lewis	1963; 1963; 1968	producer: Ollie McLaughlin (album Hello Stranger); Atlantic 2184; HLK 9724; Atlantic 584 153	US Pop #3/ R&B #1 (2 wks); UK did not chart UK did not chart
Elkie Brooks	1964	Decca F 11928/ producer: Ian Samwell	UK B-side of "Something's Got a Hold on Me" (did not chart)
The Capitols	1966; 1966; 1969; 1971	producer: Ollie McLaughlin (album Dance the Cool Jerk); Karen 1524; Atlantic 584 004; Atlantic 584 251 credited to The Three Caps; Atlantic 2091105 credited to The Three Caps	US B-side to "Cool Jerk" (#7); UK B-side to "Cool Jerk" (did not chart); UK B-side to "Cool Jerk" (did not chart); UK B-side to "Cool Jerk" (did not chart)
Darius	1969	Chartmaker 419/ producers: Pat Glasser & Butch Parker	US did not chart
Fire & Rain	1973	producer: Joe Saraceno (album Fire & Rain); Mercury 73373	US Pop #100 Easy Listening #24
New York Rubber Rock Band feat. Colleen Heather	1976	producers: Bob Motta & Vince Traina; HS 10002	US Dance #31
Yvonne Elliman	1977	producer: Freddie Perren (album Love Me); RSO 871	US Pop #15/ R&B #57/ Easy Listening #1 (4 wks); Canada Pop #13/ Adult Contemporary #1 (1 week); UK (RSO 2090 235) #26/ Netherlands #20/ New Zealand #12
Carrie Lucas	1985	producers: Bill Simmons & Jeffery Cooper (album Horsin' Around); Constellation MCA 23589	US R&B #20

== In film and television ==
The 2016 American drama film Moonlight, directed by Barry Jenkins, features "Hello Stranger" as the song that reunites the main character with his childhood first love.

The 2019 BBC and Netflix series Giri/Haji features the original version of "Hello Stranger" in the final scene and ending credits of the last episode of season 1 (episode 8).

This is played on the Netflix series Obsession.

== See also ==
- List of number-one R&B singles of 1963 (U.S.)
- List of number-one adult contemporary singles of 1977 (U.S.)
