= Food of Love (album) =

Studio album by Yvonne Elliman
- Released: 1973
- Genres: Rock; pop rock
- Length: 41:34
- Labels: Purple (UK); MCA (US)
- Producer: Rupert Hine

Yvonne Elliman chronology
Yvonne Elliman (1972)	Food of Love (1973)	Rising Sun (1975)

Professional ratings
Review scores
Source	Rating
Allmusic	2/5 stars

Food of Love is a 1973 album by Yvonne Elliman, produced by Rupert Hine, released on Purple Records in England and MCA Records in America.

Yvonne Elliman arrived in London from Hawaii after graduating from high school, and she was cast by Andrew Lloyd Webber/Tim Rice in their musical Jesus Christ Superstar. Her big song in the rock opera, "I Don't Know How To Love Him", made her a star, and the song is referred to in a song on this album, "I Don't Know How to Love Him Blues", written by David MacIver and Rupert Hine. Musicians who appear on Food of Love include keyboardist Peter Robinson, bass player John Gustafson, guitarists Caleb Quaye and Mick Grabham, and also Pete Townshend of The Who (Elliman covers their debut hit "I Can't Explain" on the album). Elliman also covers Robbie Robertson's "The Moon Struck One" from Cahoots. A song by a then-virtually unknown Jim Steinman, "Happy Ending", also appears.

== Track listing ==
1. "Casserole Me Over" (David MacIver, Rupert Hine) - 2:49
2. "More than one, less than Five" (MacIver, Hine) - 3:52
3. "I Want to Make you Laugh, I Want to Make you Cry" (James Rado) - 4:24
4. "Muesli Dreams" (MacIver, Hine) - 3:48
5. "I Can't Explain" (Pete Townshend) - 3:12
6. "Sunshine" (MacIver, Hine) - 3:46
7. "Hawaii" (Elliman) - 3:12
8. "I Don't Know How To Love Him Blues" (MacIver, Hine) - 2:57
9. "The Moon Struck One" (Robbie Robertson) - 4:24
10. "Happy Ending" (Jim Steinman) - 3:57
11. "Love's Bringing Me Down" (MacIver, Hine) - 5:13

== Personnel ==
- Guitar: Mick Grabham, Simon Jeffes, Caleb Quaye, Pete Townshend
- Bass guitar: John Gustafson, John G. Perry, Daryl Runswick
- Drums: Michael Giles
- Percussion: Ray Cooper, Morris Pert
- Keyboards: Ann Odell, Peter Robinson
- Keyboards, harmonica: Rupert Hine
- Cello: Paul Buckmaster
- Backing Vocals: Irene Chandler, Rosetta Hightower, Ruby James, Liza Strike, Joanne Williams
