= Perfect Moment =

1997 song by Edyta Górniak

Song by Edyta Górniak

from the album Edyta Górniak
- Released: 7 November 1997
- Label: EMI Music
- Songwriters: Jim Marr; Wendy Page
- Producer: Christopher Neil

"Perfect Moment" is a song originally by Polish singer Edyta Górniak from her first international album, Edyta Górniak (1997). It was written by Jim Marr and Wendy Page and produced by Christopher Neil. A cover by British singer and actress Martine McCutcheon reached number one on the UK Singles Chart in 1999.

== Martine McCutcheon version ==
"Perfect Moment"

Single by Martine McCutcheon

from the album You Me & Us
- Released: 5 April 1999
- Genre: Pop
- Length: 3:49
- Label: Virgin
- Songwriters: Jim Marr; Wendy Page
- Producer: Tony Moran

Martine McCutcheon singles chronology
"Perfect Moment" (1999)	"I've Got You" (1999)

English actress Martine McCutcheon covered "Perfect Moment" and released it as her debut single on 5 April 1999 by Virgin Records. Her version reached number one on the UK Singles Chart that same month, launching her music career after her leaving BBC soap EastEnders, in which she played the character Tiffany Mitchell from 1995 to 1999. Over 22 million viewers tuned in to watch the final scenes of Mitchell's death after being hit by a car. The song also reached number three in Ireland and peaked at number 10 on the Eurochart Hot 100. It was produced by Tony Moran and included on McCutcheon's debut album, You Me & Us (1999). The accompanying music video was filmed in New York City.

=== Critical reception ===
AllMusic editor John Lucas placed McCutcheon alongside her idols Barbra Streisand and Celine Dion. He stated that "her voice soars on the chart-topping power ballad". Nigel Williamson from Billboard magazine noted it as a "sweeping ballad in the style of Celine Dion". Can't Stop the Pop described it as an "orchestral, sweeping ballad" and a "real showcase for her flexibility as a pop vocalist. The first verse and chorus are strikingly ethereal; there’s a calm serenity as the song shimmers and throbs alongside the gentle, warm vocals. If there was any part of Tiffany Mitchell in the song, then this is where she wakes up at the pearly gates of heaven." Tom Ewing from Freaky Trigger noted that the song "starts with a gentle, gauzy arrangement that suggests some kind of celestial waiting room." He added it as "unashamedly, open-heartedly sentimental".

Caroline Sullivan from The Guardian named it "a titanic belter of a ballad", noting the "diva's vibrato". Liverpool Echo said it is "one of those soaring, Streisand-like ballads that no one admits to liking but mysteriously sells hundreds of thousands of copies." A reviewer from NME described it as "total rapture". Sunday Mirror commented, "Bound to be a huge hit. Sounds a bit like a breathy Kylie. Which is no bad thing." Sunday Mercury noted, "It's surprising that Martine McCutcheon should release a ballad as her first single, rather than a catchy pop hit. But what's even more surprising is how good it is." The newspaper added, "It's a soulful number, sung with feeling by someone blessed with a superb voice. It's a slow burner, but it wasn't long before I was humming it to myself." They also concluded, "Goodbye Albert Square, hello Top of the Pops and a number one hit."

=== Music video ===
The music video for "Perfect Moment" begins with McCutcheon standing in front of a microphone, in a room overlooking a New York City street. Sometimes she also sits against the wall or lies on a sofa while she sings. Occasionally there are black-and-white clips of McCutcheon at different sites in the city. More than halfway through the video, the singer is seen standing on a roof, singing to the microphone, overlooking the city. As the video nears its end, McCutcheon lies on the couch again, singing the last lines of the song.

=== Charts ===
==== Weekly charts ====
Chart (1999)	Peak position
Europe (Eurochart Hot 100)	10
Germany (GfK)	100
Ireland (IRMA)	3
Scotland Singles (OCC)	1
UK Singles (OCC)	1

==== Year-end charts ====
Chart (1999)	Position
UK Singles (OCC)	14

=== Certifications ===
Region	Certification	Certified units/sales
United Kingdom (BPI)	Platinum	638,000
