= Night Flight (Yvonne Elliman album) =

Studio album by Yvonne Elliman
- Released: 1978
- Genre: Pop, pop rock, disco
- Label: RSO
- Producer: Robert Appère

Yvonne Elliman chronology
Love Me (1977)	Night Flight (1978)	Yvonne (1979)

Night Flight is a 1978 album by Yvonne Elliman featuring the number-one song "If I Can't Have You".

== Reception ==
Professional ratings
Review scores
Source	Rating
AllMusic	4/5 stars

According to The New York Times's John Rockwell, Night Flight "sounds more confident and appealing than her previous work". In another review, Rockwell stated Elliman "has a lovely, smoky soprano, she phrases with conviction in both ballads and up‐tempo numbers, and she is decidedly alluring to look at".

== Tour ==
A tour for the album began February 13, 1978, in Philadelphia.

== Track listing ==
1. "Baby Don't Let It Mess Your Mind" (Phil Cody, Neil Sedaka) – 4:21
2. "In a Stranger's Arms" (Danny Kortchmar) – 3:45
3. "I'll Be Around" (Jack Conrad, Mentor Williams) – 3:27
4. "Lady of the Silver Spoon" (Brian Cadd) – 4:16
5. "Down the Backstairs of My Life" (Eric Mercury, William D. Smith) – 3:17
6. "If I Can't Have You" (Barry Gibb, Maurice Gibb, Robin Gibb) – 3:00
7. "Prince of Fools" (Joy Parker, Nicky Barclay) – 3:35
8. "Sally Go 'Round the Roses" (Zell Sanders, Lona Stevens) – 4:23
9. "Up to the Man in You" (Yvonne Elliman) – 3:15
10. "Sailing Ships" (Stephen Bishop) – 4:46

== Personnel ==
- Yvonne Elliman – vocals
- Guitar: Ben Benay, Bob Bowles, Steve Cropper, Lowell George, Steve Hunter, Davey Johnstone, Danny Kortchmar, Dean Parks, Richie Zito
- Bass guitar: Scott Edwards, Dee Murray, Leland Sklar, Paul Stallworth
- Keyboards: Sonny Burke, Eric Carmen, Craig Doerge, James Newton Howard, William "Smitty" Smith
- Drums: Michael Baird, James Gadson, Richie Hayward, Jim Keltner, Russ Kunkel
- Percussion: Gary Coleman, Paulinho da Costa, Freddie Perren, Bob Zimmitti
- Horns: Chuck Findley, Jim Horn, Jackie Kelso
- Backing vocals: Kathy Collier, Kiki Dee, Donny Gerrard, Venette Gloud, Henry Kapono, Marti McCall, Cecilio Rodriguez, Julia Waters Tillman, Carmen Twillie, Maxine Waters Willard
