= Yvonne Elliman =

Hawaiian singer, songwriter, and actress (born 1951)

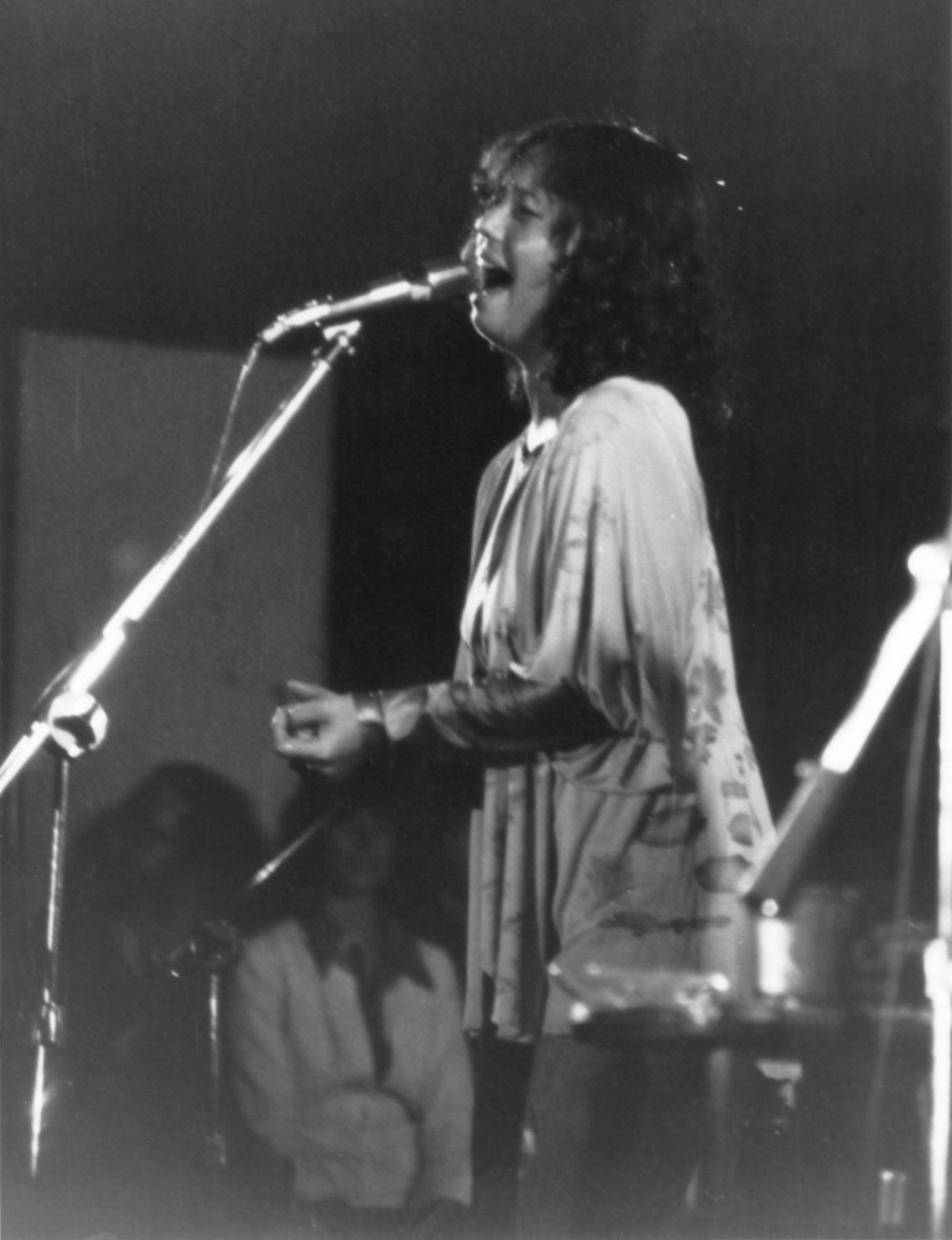
- Elliman on tour in San Bernardino, California, August 15, 1975

Background information
- Born: Yvonne Marianne Elliman; December 29, 1951 (age 74); Honolulu, Hawaii Territory, U.S.
- Genres: R&B, soul, blue-eyed soul, disco
- Occupations: Singer, songwriter, actress
- Instruments: Vocals, piano, guitar
- Years active: 1969–1980, 2004–present
- Labels: Purple Records, RSO Records, Polydor Records, Umgd Records, Umvd Import, Polygram Records, Taragon Records

Yvonne Marianne Elliman (born December 29, 1951) is an American singer, songwriter, and actress who performed for four years in the first cast of the stage musical Jesus Christ Superstar. She scored a number of hits in the 1970s and achieved a U.S. No. 1 hit with "If I Can't Have You". The song also reached No. 9 on the Adult Contemporary chart and number 4 on the UK Singles Chart. Her cover of Barbara Lewis's "Hello Stranger" went to No. 1 on the Adult Contemporary chart, and "Love Me" was No. 5; at the time she had three top-ten singles. After a long hiatus in the 1980s and 1990s, during which she left music to be with her family, she made a comeback album as a singer-songwriter in 2004.

== Early life and education ==
Yvonne Marianne Elliman was born on December 29, 1951 and raised in the Manoa neighborhood of Honolulu, Hawaii. Her mother was of Japanese and Chinese ancestry, and her father, a salesman for Best Foods, was of Irish descent. Elliman showed interest in music from an early age, playing the ukulele by age four and taking piano lessons at age seven. While attending President Theodore Roosevelt High School, Elliman performed in the school band on upright bass and violin. However, she became most proficient on the guitar and performed as a singer and guitarist in a folk music band named We Folk, which she formed with schoolmates. The band fared well competing in local talent shows.

According to Elliman she was truant during her senior year at high school but graduated owing to the intervention of Peter Wilcox, the school's British-born band teacher, who persuaded her teachers to allow her to pass. He encouraged 17-year-old Elliman to relocate to London and pursue a musical career, which she did shortly after graduating.

== Career ==
=== London years, Jesus Christ Superstar ===
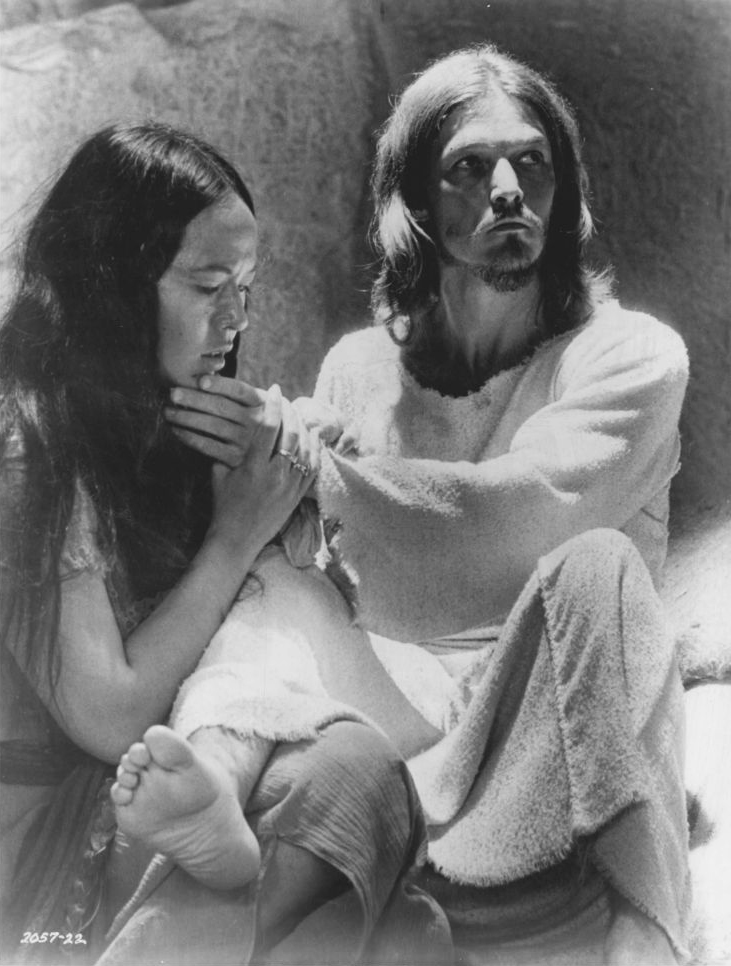
Elliman with Ted Neeley in the 1973 feature film Jesus Christ Superstar

Elliman's singing career began in 1969 in London, performing in bars and clubs. At the time she did not like what she was singing. "I hated the music then", she recalled in a 1973 interview, adding, "I did it for the bread. I was into drugs and all that, and thought Grace Slick and the Jefferson Airplane was it". Still an unknown, she was discovered by Tim Rice and Andrew Lloyd Webber, who asked her to sing Mary Magdalene's part for the original audio recording of Jesus Christ Superstar. Ian Gillan was featured singing as Jesus. After its release as an album in 1970, they invited her to join the stage show's travelling cast, which she did for four years.

She had her first Billboard Hot 100 hit single in 1971 with the ballad "I Don't Know How to Love Him" from Jesus Christ Superstar. Her original version was not issued as a single until a cover version by Helen Reddy started moving up the U.S. charts; appearing concurrently on the charts (a rare event, not common since the 1950s when different releases played in different parts of the United States), Elliman's original peaked at #28, while Reddy's cover peaked at #13. In the end Elliman performed on the 1970 concept album, with the original Broadway cast (1971), and in the 1973 film. She and Barry Dennen were the only cast members to feature in all three versions of the project. Her performance in the film as Mary Magdalene led to her being nominated for a 1974 Golden Globe for Best Actress in a Motion Picture Comedy or Musical.

=== New York and disco ===
In 1971, aged 19, Elliman moved to New York City for the Broadway production of Jesus Christ, Superstar, where she met her first husband, Bill Oakes, who was president of Robert Stigwood's RSO Records. Before moving she was signed to Purple Records, singing on Jon Lord's album Gemini Suite in 1971 and releasing her second solo album Food of Love in 1973. She was asked to sing backing vocals on Eric Clapton's version of the Bob Marley song "I Shot the Sheriff" in 1974. She then went on tour as part of Clapton's band, and soon afterwards got her own recording contract with RSO Records. She continued to work with Clapton, performing on his albums from 1974 to 1977, including 461 Ocean Boulevard, There's One in Every Crowd, E. C. Was Here, No Reason to Cry, and Slowhand. A first album for the RSO label (her third in all), Rising Sun, produced by Steve Cropper, produced no hit singles, but her next album, Love Me, produced by Freddie Perren, gave her two top-20 hits, "Love Me" (written by Barry and Robin Gibb), and a Barbara Lewis cover song, "Hello Stranger". "Hello Stranger" topped the U.S. Easy Listening chart for four weeks, and was also a No. 15 pop hit in 1977; "Love Me" was a No. 14 pop hit in late 1976/early 1977.

Also in 1977, the Bee Gees were working on Saturday Night Fever and wrote "How Deep Is Your Love" for her but Stigwood wanted the Bee Gees to perform it. Instead, she sang "If I Can't Have You". The song became a number-one hit on the Billboard Hot 100; it is generally considered the high point of her recording career.

A few minor top 40 hits followed in 1979, including the title theme song from the film Moment by Moment and another disco track, "Love Pains", which was a major club success. She appeared in Hawaii Five-O in a two-part episode ("Number One with a Bullet", 1978) as an aspiring singer, performing the song "I Can't Get You Outa My Mind" with fellow guest performer James Darren. The single "Savannah" was also a minor hit.

=== Hiatus and return ===
After spending a decade pursuing her career, Elliman went on hiatus as she had two children at home.

In 2004, Elliman released the album Simple Needs, for which she wrote all the songs.

Elliman has continued performing at music festivals, benefits, and concerts. She performed on a PBS special on 1970s soul music in 2004, singing "If I Can't Have You." In 2014 she reunited with Neeley and Dennen in Verona for a special Jesus Christ Superstar event. She is featured on the 2014 Neeley EP Rock Opera performing a duet with him on "Up Where We Belong". In summer 2018, she joined in 45th anniversary Superstar film screenings events in Los Angeles.

== Personal life ==
Elliman was married to RSO Records executive Bill Oakes from 1972 to 1980. She married songwriter Wade Hyman in 1981 and they had two children, Sage (born in 1982) and Ben (born in 1986). They later separated and divorced. She married Allen Alexander in 2016.

On August 16, 2017, Elliman was slated to sing for a Catholic school charity in Guam when she was stopped by customs for possession of marijuana and methamphetamine. After spending a night in jail, she and her husband pleaded guilty to possession of a controlled substance, continued with the planned concert, and were allowed to return to Hawaii on probation until their March 2018 sentencing. They were ordered to perform community service and serve the remainder of a two-week sentence, Billboard magazine said, "by observing courtroom proceedings of a drug offender probation program in Honolulu."

== Discography ==
- Yvonne Elliman (1972)
- Food of Love (1973)
- Rising Sun (1975)
- Love Me (1977)
- Night Flight (1978)
- Yvonne (1979)
- Simple Needs (2004)

== See also ==
- List of number-one hits (United States)
- List of artists who reached number one on the Hot 100 (U.S.)
