= Talking in Your Sleep (Crystal Gayle song) =

1978 single by Crystal Gayle

Single by Crystal Gayle

from the album When I Dream
- B-side: "Painting This Old Town Blue" "Hello I Love You" (West Germany)
- Released: January 6, 1978
- Recorded: 1977
- Genre: Country pop, soft rock
- Length: 3:04
- Label: United Artists
- Songwriter(s): Roger Cook, Bobby Wood
- Producer(s): Allen Reynolds

Crystal Gayle singles chronology
"Ready For the Times to Get Better" (1978)	"Talking in Your Sleep" (1978)	"Why Have You Left the One You Left Me For" (1978)

"Talking in Your Sleep"

Single by Marmalade
- B-side: "Make It Really Easy"
- Released: January 1978
- Recorded: 1977
- Genre: Pop
- Label: Target
- Songwriter(s): Roger Cook, Bobby Wood
- Producer(s): Roger Greenaway

Marmalade singles chronology
"Mystery Has Gone" (1977)	"Talking in Your Sleep" (1978)	"Heavens Above" (1978)

"Talking in Your Sleep" is a song written by Roger Cook and Bobby Wood. The first recorded version of the song is by the band Marmalade, produced by Cook's longtime collaborator Roger Greenaway; Marmalade's version was also released as single in 1978 but failed to chart.

== Crystal Gayle recording ==
"Talking in Your Sleep" was most successful when recorded by American country music artist Crystal Gayle. It was released in January 1978 as the first single from the album When I Dream. The song became a hit on both the country and pop charts in 1978. It peaked at number one on the US Country chart for two weeks, number eighteen on the US Pop chart and number three at the US Adult Contemporary chart.

In 1977, Gayle achieved international crossover Pop success for the first time with her No. 1 hit "Don't It Make My Brown Eyes Blue". Following the song's success, Gayle was recording more Pop and Adult Contemporary-styled Country tunes. This song is one of the first examples of this. "Talking in Your Sleep" was released in early 1978, and was a hit mid-year. The song proved an instant follow-up for Gayle on the Pop charts, being she had not had another Top 40 Pop hit since "Don't It Make My Brown Eyes Blue" the previous year.

"Talking in Your Sleep" was released on Gayle's major-selling album from that year called When I Dream. Following "Talking in Your Sleep"'s success as a crossover smash, Gayle only achieved one more Top 40 Pop hit as a solo artist, which came the next year with the song, "Half the Way". She also reached the Top Ten in 1982 with the hit single "You and I" a duet with Eddie Rabbitt.

== Chart performance (Crystal Gayle version) ==
Chart (1978)	Peak position
US Hot Country Songs (Billboard)	1
US Billboard Hot 100	18
US Adult Contemporary (Billboard)	3
Canadian RPM Country Tracks	1
Canadian RPM Top Singles	11
Canadian RPM Adult Contemporary Tracks	3
Ireland (IRMA)	5
UK Singles Chart	11

== Other versions ==
- "Talking in Your Sleep" was covered by Kikki Danielsson in 1979 on her debut album Rock'n Yodel
- Reba McEntire in 1995 on her album Starting Over.
- Cilla Black released a version on her 1980 album Especially for You.
- Darren Holden in 1998 on his debut album Suddenly.
- It was also covered by Martine McCutcheon on her album You Me & Us in 1999.
