= Timeless: The All-Time Greatest Hits =

Greatest hits album by the Bee Gees
- Released: 21 April 2017
- Recorded: 1966–1987
- Genres: Pop, rock, disco
- Label: Capitol
- Producers: Bee Gees, Albhy Galuten, Karl Richardson, Arif Mardin, Robert Stigwood, Nat Kipner

The Bee Gees chronology
| 1974–1979 (2015) | Timeless: The All-Time Greatest Hits (2017) |

Timeless: The All-Time Greatest Hits is a compilation album by the Bee Gees. It was released on 21 April 2017 by Capitol Records to coincide with the 40th anniversary of the Saturday Night Fever soundtrack. The album is a single-disc compilation of the group's biggest hits selected by the group's last surviving member, Barry Gibb. Gibb said of the compilation: "Although there are many other songs, these songs, I feel, are the songs that Maurice, Robin, and I would be most proud of."

== Content ==
The album is a career spanning compilation featuring 21 tracks selected by Barry Gibb that ranges from their first Australian hit, "Spicks and Specks", to the group's international number one single, "You Win Again". Several hits are omitted, including "Holiday", "Run to Me", "Love So Right", "One" and "World".

== Track listing ==
All compositions by Barry, Robin and Maurice Gibb, except as indicated.

1966
| No. | Title | Writer(s) | Original release | Length |
|---|---|---|---|---|
| 1. | "Spicks and Specks" | Barry Gibb | Spicks and Specks, 1966 | 2:51 |
| 2. | "New York Mining Disaster 1941" | Barry Gibb, Robin Gibb | Bee Gees 1st, 1967 | 2:10 |
| 3. | "To Love Somebody" | Barry Gibb, Robin Gibb | Bee Gees 1st, 1967 | 3:00 |
| 4. | "Massachusetts" | | Horizontal, 1967 | 2:22 |
| 5. | "Words" | | A-side Single, 1968 | 3:17 |
| 6. | "I've Gotta Get a Message to You" | | Idea, 1968 | 3:04 |
| 7. | "I Started a Joke" | | Idea, 1968 | 3:17 |
| 8. | "Lonely Days" | | 2 Years On, 1970 | 3:47 |
| 9. | "How Can You Mend a Broken Heart" | Barry Gibb, Robin Gibb | Trafalgar, 1971 | 3:38 |
| 10. | "Jive Talkin'" | | Main Course, 1975 | 3:44 |
| 11. | "Nights on Broadway" | | Main Course, 1975 | 4:33 |
| 12. | "Fanny (Be Tender with My Love)" | | Main Course, 1975 | 4:04 |
| 13. | "You Should Be Dancing" | | Children of the World, 1976 | 4:16 |
| 14. | "How Deep Is Your Love" | | Saturday Night Fever, 1977 | 4:02 |
| 15. | "Stayin' Alive" | | Saturday Night Fever, 1977 | 4:43 |
| 16. | "Night Fever" | | Saturday Night Fever, 1977 | 3:32 |
| 17. | "More Than a Woman" | | Saturday Night Fever, 1977 | 3:17 |
| 18. | "Too Much Heaven" | | Spirits Having Flown, 1979 | 4:54 |
| 19. | "Tragedy" | | Spirits Having Flown, 1979 | 5:02 |
| 20. | "Love You Inside Out" | | Spirits Having Flown, 1979 | 4:10 |
| 21. | "You Win Again" | | E.S.P., 1987 | 4:03 |

== Charts ==
=== Weekly charts ===
Weekly chart performance for Timeless: The All-Time Greatest Hits
| Chart (2017–2026) | Peak position |
|---|---|
| Australian Albums (ARIA) | 30 |
| Belgian Albums (Ultratop Flanders) | 32 |
| Belgian Albums (Ultratop Wallonia) | 148 |
| Canadian Albums (Billboard) | 87 |
| German Albums (Offizielle Top 100) | 73 |
| Scottish Albums (Official Charts) | 6 |
| Spanish Albums (Promusicae) | 71 |
| Swiss Albums (Schweizer Hitparade) | 32 |
| UK Albums (Official Charts) | 6 |
| US Billboard 200 | 41 |

=== Year-end charts ===
Year-end chart performance for Timeless: The All-Time Greatest Hits
| Chart (2021) | Position |
|---|---|
| Australian Albums (ARIA) | 94 |
| UK Albums (OCC) | 67 |

== Certifications ==
| Region | Certification | Certified units/sales |
|---|---|---|
| France (SNEP) | Platinum | 100,000^{‡} |
| United Kingdom (BPI) | 2× Platinum | 600,000^{‡} |
^{‡} Sales+streaming figures based on certification alone.
