= Saturday Night Fever (musical) =

1998 musical based on the film

- Logo
- Music: Bee Gees and other artists
- Lyrics: Bee Gees and other artists
- Book: Nan Knighton; Arlene Phillips; Paul Nicholas; Robert Stigwood
- Basis: Saturday Night Fever by Norman Wexler
- Productions: 1998 West End; 1999 Broadway; 2004 West End; Multiple touring productions Multiple international productions

Saturday Night Fever is a 1998 jukebox musical based on the 1977 film Saturday Night Fever. Its book is by Nan Knighton (in collaboration with Arlene Phillips, Paul Nicholas, and Robert Stigwood), and the songs mostly consist of songs that were featured in the film's soundtrack, which in turn were mostly written and performed by the Bee Gees.

The musical focuses on Tony Manero, an Italian-American Brooklyn youth whose weekend is spent at the local discotheque. There he luxuriates in the admiration of the crowd and a growing relationship with Stephanie Mangano, and can temporarily forget the realities of his life, including a dead-end job in a paint store and his gang of deadbeat friends. In an effort to make it a family-friendly show, many of the film's darker elements, including references to racial conflict, drug use, and violence, were eliminated from the plot.

== Productions ==
=== Original West End production (1998) ===
Directed and choreographed by Phillips, the £4 million stage adaptation premiered in the West End on 5 May 1998 at the London Palladium, and closed on 26 February 2000. The original cast included Adam Garcia as Tony and Anita Louise Combe as Stephanie. Laurence Olivier Award nominations went to Garcia for Best Actor in a Musical, Phillips for Best Theatre Choreographer, and the production for Best New Musical . A cast album was released by Polydor Records.

=== Original Broadway production (1999) ===
After twenty-seven previews, the Broadway production, with Phillips directing, opened on 21 October 1999 at the Minskoff Theatre, where it ran for 501 performances. The cast included James Carpinello as Tony and Paige Price as Stephanie, with Orfeh as Annette, Paul Castree as Bobby C., and Bryan Batt as DJ Monty.

=== UK Touring productions ===
The first UK tour production ran from 11 November 2000 to 29 September 2001, with Ben Richards as Tony Manero.

In 2003 a second UK touring production ran from 1 March 2003 to 19 June 2004. The tour was a different version to the previous productions including some major revival changes. In the place of "More than a Woman (1)" the song "Words" was put into the show. This song was performed by Tony and Stephanie. The cast included Stephane Anelli as Tony and Victoria Hamilton-Barritt as Stephanie.

The Third UK tour began on 12 September 2005, while the show was also playing on the West End. The tour ran until 5 August 2006.

On 9 March 2018, Producer Bill Kenwright announced a new production of the musical, which opened on 30 August 2018 at the New Wimbledon Theatre, and subsequently toured.

The Bill Kenwright production returned in 2022 with a limited engagement at the Peacock Theatre in London from February 4 to March 26, 2022, starring Richard Winsor as Tony Manero. Following the Peacock Theatre run, another UK tour began on September 5, 2022 at Milton Keynes Theatre and closed on November 26, 2022 at The Alexandra, Birmingham

=== West End Revival production (2004) ===
A London revival ran from 6 July 2004 to 16 February 2006 at the Apollo Victoria Theatre, prior to a lengthy UK tour. . The cast included Stephane Anelli as Tony and Zoe Ebsworth as Stephanie, with Kym Marsh as Annette and Shaun Williamson as DJ Monty.

=== International Productions ===
An Argentinian production opened at El Nacional, Buenos Aires, on 4 April 2001 and closed on 28 July 2001. The cast included Darío Petruzio as Tony Manero, Silvia Luchetti as Stephanie, Elena Roger as Annette, Héctor Pilatti as Monty and Charlie G. as Bobby C.

Producer Joop van den Ende's Stage Entertainment company opened a Dutch production at the Beatrix Theater, Utrecht, on 17 June 2001. It closed on 23 February 2003. The cast included Joost de Jong as Tony Manero, Chantal Janzen as Stephanie, and various TV personalities as DJ Monty, one of them was Carlo Boszhard.

From 27 March 2003 to 28 September 2003 the show ran at Teatro Pedregal, Mexico City with Mauricio Martínez as Tony Manero, Lisset as Stephanie, Gisela Sehedi as Annette, Jaime Rojas as Monty and Eduardo Partida as Bobby C.

In January 2007 the show opened at the National Theatre of Korea, Seoul, South Korea where it stayed for 10 weeks before embarking on a short tour of Asia, playing in Daegu Opera House, Daegu, South Korea and the Taipei International Convention Centre, Taipei, Taiwan.

A Spanish production opened at Teatro Coliseum, Madrid on 19 February 2009 and closed on 30 August 2009. Produced by Stage Entertainment, the cast included Juan Pablo Di Pace as Tony Manero. On 6 December 2009 the Spanish production started a national tour and ran until 30 May 2010. Although a complete cast album was never released, five songs were recorded in Spanish for promotional purposes: Stayin' Alive, Disco Inferno, Night Fever, Inmortality and How Deep Is Your Love.

In April 2011 it debuted on Royal Caribbean's cruise ship Liberty of the Seas. Produced by Royal Caribbean Productions in association with Robert Stigwood. It plays twice a week. Choreographers include Spencer Liff, Diego Orengo, and Doriana Sanchez. Music direction by Phil Edwards. Directed By Loren Van Brenk.

A heavily re-written version of the show debuted at the English Theatre Frankfurt in October 2013, directed by Ryan McBryde. The company comprised actor-musicians, the script largely re-written to more closely follow the darker plot of the movie, and new musical numbers added. This production closed in April 2014, before being later re-worked and re-choreographed for a UK tour, produced by Theatre Royal Bath Productions in association with the Robert Stigwood Organisation, in November 2014. The tour achieved mixed critical success.

A production ran at the South African State Theatre in Pretoria from 16 September – 9 October 2016.

The Gordon Frost Organisation produced a revival of the musical at Sydney's Lyric Theatre in March 2019.

== Characters ==
Character	Description
Tony Manero	A 19-year-old ladies' man living in the 1970s. His passion is dancing on a Saturday night down at the local dance club. He finds himself caught up in a love triangle. His ex-girlfriend Annette is madly in love with him, but he has eyes for a new girl Stephanie Mangano. Stephanie likes Tony back, and after an incident following the dance contest, she goes off him.
Stephanie Mangano	A 20-year-old office worker from Manhattan. Stephanie classes herself as a refined citizen and convinces Tony she is a "snotty bitch", however she is the complete opposite. Stephanie meets Tony at the dance club and after agreeing to be his dance partner in the dance contest, falls in love with him. After he tries to rape her, she runs away crying. She feels sorry for Tony after his best friend dies and goes to talk to him.
Annette	A sex-crazed girl. Annette is obsessed with Tony and even though she loves him, only wants to use him for one thing.
Bobby C	A troubled youth. Bobby's life gets turned upside down when he gets his girlfriend Pauline pregnant. He ends up having a breakdown after his friends ignore his call for help. He dies after falling off the Manhattan bridge.
Monty	DJ at the Odyssey 2001 Dance Studio.
Gus	A friend of Tony Manero's. After getting beaten up by a gang, he tells his friends it was their rival group, but they later discover he had made it up.
Double J	A friend of Tony Manero's
Frank Manero	Unemployed Father of Tony
Flo Manero	Tony's very religious mother
Frank Manero, Jr.	Tony's priest brother. After leaving the church and returning home, Tony takes him clubbing, their mother Flo flips on both of them.
Linda Manero	Tony's little sister.
Maria	A Spanish dancer at the Odyssey 2001
Cesar	A Spanish dancer at the Odyssey 2001
Doreen	A shy geeky teenager at the Odyssey 2001. She has an obsession with Tony and is fixated by watching him dance.
Mr Fusco	Tony's boss at the paint store.

== Musical numbers ==
The following is the song list of the original production. Subsequent productions have different songs or rearranged their order.

Act I

- "Stayin' Alive" – Tony and Company
- "Boogie Shoes" (Music and lyrics by Harry Casey and Richard Finch) – Tony, Bobby C, Joey, Double J, and Gus
- "Disco Inferno" (Music and lyrics by Leroy Green and Ron Kersey) – Monty and Company
- "Night Fever" – Tony and Company
- "Disco Duck" (Music and lyrics by Rick Dees) – Monty
- "More Than a Woman" – Tony and Stephanie
- "If I Can't Have You" – Annette
- "It's My Neighborhood" – Company
- "You Should Be Dancing" – Tony and Company

Act II

- "Jive Talkin'" – Tony, Annette, Bobby C, Joey, Double J, Gus, and Company
- "First and Last/Tragedy" – Bobby C
- "What Kind of Fool (Music and lyrics by Albhy Galuten and Barry Gibb) – Stephanie
- "Nights on Broadway" – Annette, Stephanie, and Company
- Dance Competition
  - "Night Fever" – Company
  - "Open Sesame" (Music and lyrics by Ronald Bell) – Chester and Shirley
  - "More Than a Woman" – Tony and Stephanie
  - "Salsation" (Music and lyrics by David Shire) – Cesar and Maria
- "Immortality" – Tony
- "How Deep Is Your Love" – Tony and Stephanie

All songs were originally written and performed by the Bee Gees except where otherwise noted.
