= Edge of the Universe (song) =

1975 single by the Bee Gees

Single by Bee Gees

from the album Main Course
- A-side: "Nights on Broadway"
- Released: September 1975
- Genre: Pop rock; yacht rock; psychedelia
- Label: RSO
- Songwriters: Barry & Robin Gibb
- Producer: Arif Mardin

Bee Gees singles chronology
"Wind of Change" (1975)	"Edge of the Universe" (1975)	"Country Lanes" (1975)

"Edge of the Universe" is a rock song by the Bee Gees, written by Barry and Robin Gibb from the album Main Course released in 1975, and also released as a B-side of "Nights on Broadway".

== Recording ==
In 1975, the Bee Gees moved their operations to Miami Beach, Florida, at the suggestion of Eric Clapton following his comeback album 461 Ocean Boulevard the year before. The group recorded an album with famed R&B producer Arif Mardin called Mr. Natural in 1974 with little commercial success. The album did, however, turn the Gibbs towards a new sound compared to the kind of music the brothers were producing in the early-1970s. This new flavoured sound carried over on to their next album, 1975's Main Course, also produced by Arif Mardin.

The Bee Gees had formed the nucleus of their band in early 1975 with Blue Weaver on keyboards, Alan Kendall on lead guitar and Dennis Bryon on drums. Also part of the Bee Gees to mid to late-1970s sound was The Boneroo Horns, brought to Miami in 1973 by Dr. John. Recording for "Edge of the Universe" took place on 30 January, the same day as "Jive Talkin'", "Songbird", "Fanny (Be Tender with My Love)" and "All This Making Love".

== Reception ==
Rolling Stone critic Stephen Holden called it "a slice of dumb psychedelia".

== Personnel ==
- Barry Gibb – lead vocals, rhythm guitar
- Robin Gibb – lead vocals
- Maurice Gibb – bass, harmony vocals
- Alan Kendall – lead guitar
- Dennis Bryon – drums
- Blue Weaver – Moog synthesizer, keyboard

== Edge of the Universe (Live) ==
"Edge of the Universe"

Single by Bee Gees

from the album Here at Last... Bee Gees... Live
- B-side: "Words (Live)"
- Released: May 1977
- Recorded: The Forum, Los Angeles, California, 20 December 1976
- Genre: Pop rock
- Length: 5:15 (Album Version) 3:55 (Single Version)
- Label: RSO
- Songwriters: Barry & Robin Gibb
- Producers: Bee Gees, Albhy Galuten, Karl Richardson

Bee Gees singles chronology
"Boogie Child" (1976)	"Edge of the Universe" (1977)	"How Deep Is Your Love" (1977)

As part of their 1976 Children of the World tour, The Bee Gees recorded their 20 December concert at The Forum in Los Angeles, which contained a brisk performance of "Edge of the Universe", which was eventually released as a single in the summer of 1977 and became a Top 40 hit in the U.S.

The biggest differences between the studio and live versions are a slower tempo on the original and the use of synthesizer (replacing the original guitar riff on the original) on the live version.

Cash Box said, "the tune combines the sounds that made the Bee Gees popular in the '60s as well as the '70s, featuring an impeccably harmonized chorus and a tricky rock and roll bridge that keeps listeners begging for more." Record World said, "The melody is its most attractive feature, and the performance, of course, shines."

=== Chart performance ===
Chart (1977)	Peak position
Canada Top Singles (RPM)	16
New Zealand (Recorded Music NZ)	19
US Billboard Hot 100	26
US Billboard Easy Listening	43
US Cash Box	26
US Record World	42
