= Here at Last... Bee Gees... Live =

Live album by the Bee Gees
- Released: May 1977
- Recorded: 20 December 1976
- Venue: The Forum (Inglewood, California)
- Genres: Pop rock; disco; funk; R&B; acoustic
- Length: 84:05
- Label: RSO
- Producers: Bee Gees; Albhy Galuten; Karl Richardson

The Bee Gees chronology
Children of the World (1976)	Here at Last... Bee Gees... Live (1977)	Saturday Night Fever (1977)

Professional ratings
Review scores
Source	Rating
AllMusic	4/5 stars
The Rolling Stone Album Guide	3/5 stars

Here at Last... Bee Gees... Live is the first live album by the Bee Gees. It was recorded on 20 December 1976 at the LA Forum and was released in May 1977 by RSO Records. It reached No. 8 in the US, No. 8 in Australia, No. 1 in New Zealand, and No. 2 in Spain.

== Background ==
Here at Last was the first official live recording released by the Bee Gees though many bootlegs have existed throughout the years of earlier performances. The concert was filmed and a TV special was planned, but after reviewing the footage, the Bee Gees were unhappy with the quality of the video so it has not been released. A single from the concert "Edge of the Universe" was released in Canada and the US where it hit No. 16 and No. 26 respectively on the singles charts. A promo single with "Lonely Days" live was released in the US, but did not chart.

The album was recorded at the LA Forum on 20 December 1976 and Barry Gibb can be heard wishing the audience a Merry Christmas at the end.

The content of the show consisted chiefly of songs that had been hit singles plus songs from the recent hit albums Main Course and Children of the World. There was also a rendition of "Down the Road" from the more obscure 1974 album Mr. Natural.

The album was originally released as a 2 part LP record and was later released as a 2-disc CD in 1990.

== Track listing ==
All compositions by Barry, Robin and Maurice Gibb except where noted

LP 1

Side one

1. "I've Gotta Get a Message to You" – 4:02
2. "Love So Right" – 4:47
3. "Edge of the Universe" (Barry Gibb, Robin Gibb) – 5:15
4. "Come on Over" (Barry Gibb, Robin Gibb) – 3:25
5. "Can't Keep a Good Man Down" – 4:47

Side two

1. "New York Mining Disaster 1941" (Barry Gibb, Robin Gibb) – 2:16
2. Medley ("Run to Me" / "World") – 2:33
3. Medley ("Holiday" / "I Can't See Nobody" / "I Started a Joke" / "Massachusetts") – 7:14
4. "How Can You Mend a Broken Heart" (Barry Gibb, Robin Gibb) – 3:45
5. "To Love Somebody" (Barry Gibb, Robin Gibb) – 4:08

LP 2

Side one

1. "You Should Be Dancing" – 9:22
2. "Boogie Child" – 5:02
3. "Down the Road" (Barry Gibb, Robin Gibb) – 4:32
4. "Words" – 4:19

Side two

1. "Wind of Change" (Barry Gibb, Robin Gibb) – 4:42
2. "Nights on Broadway" – 4:41
3. "Jive Talkin'" – 5:03
4. "Lonely Days" – 4:12

== Personnel ==
Bee Gees

- Barry Gibb – lead, harmony, and backing vocals; rhythm guitar
- Robin Gibb – lead, harmony, and backing vocals
- Maurice Gibb – harmony and backing vocals, bass guitar

Backing band

- Blue Weaver – keyboards, synthesiser
- Alan Kendall – lead guitar
- Dennis Bryon – drums

Additional musicians

- Geoff Westley – keyboards
- Joey Murcia – rhythm guitar
- Joe Lala – percussion

The Boneroo Horns

- Peter Graves
- Whit Sidener
- Ken Faulk
- Peter Ballin
- Jeff Kievit
- Stan Webb

== Charts ==
=== Weekly charts ===
Chart (1977)	Peak position
Australian Albums (Kent Music Report)	8
Canada Top Albums/CDs (RPM)	5
Dutch Albums (Album Top 100)	45
German Albums (Offizielle Top 100)	44
New Zealand Albums (RMNZ)	1
US Billboard 200	8
US Top R&B/Hip-Hop Albums (Billboard)	25

=== Year-end charts ===
Chart (1977)	Position
Canada Top Albums/CDs (RPM)	43
New Zealand Albums (RMNZ)	5
Chart (1978)	Position
New Zealand Albums (RMNZ)	25

== Certifications ==
Region	Certification	Certified units/sales
United States (RIAA)	Platinum	1,000,000^{^}
^{^} Shipments figures based on certification alone.
