= How Deep Is Your Love (Bee Gees song) =

1977 single by Bee Gees

Single by Bee Gees

from the album Saturday Night Fever
- B-side: "Can't Keep a Good Man Down"
- Released: September 1977
- Recorded: 1977
- Studio: Château d'Hérouville (France); Criteria (Miami)
- Genre: Soft rock; R&B
- Length: 4:02
- Label: RSO
- Songwriters: Barry Gibb; Robin Gibb; Maurice Gibb
- Producers: Bee Gees; Karl Richardson; Albhy Galuten

Bee Gees singles chronology
"Edge of the Universe" (1975)	"How Deep Is Your Love" (1977)	"Stayin' Alive" (1977)

Music video
- "How Deep Is Your Love" on YouTube

"How Deep Is Your Love" is a ballad written and recorded by the Bee Gees in 1977 and released as a single in September of that year by RSO Records. It was later used as part of the film Saturday Night Fever's soundtrack. It was a number-three hit in the United Kingdom and Australia. In the United States, it topped the Billboard Hot 100 on 25 December 1977 and stayed in the Top 10 for 17 weeks. It spent six weeks atop the US adult contemporary chart. It is 27th on Billboard's All Time Top 100. Alongside "Stayin' Alive" and "Night Fever", it is one of the group's three tracks on the list. Take That's recording of the song for their 1996 Greatest Hits album reached No. 1 on the UK Singles Chart for three weeks.

"How Deep Is Your Love" ranked 375th on Rolling Stone's list of the 500 Greatest Songs of All Time. In a 2011 British TV special, ITV viewers voted it The Nation's Favourite Bee Gees Song. In the Bee Gees' 2001 Billboard magazine interview, Barry said it was his favourite Bee Gees song.

== Composition and recording ==
"How Deep Is Your Love" sample

After mixing Here at Last... Bee Gees... Live, the Bee Gees began recording songs for the followup studio album to 1976's Children of the World. Then their manager Robert Stigwood requested songs for a movie he was producing. The Bee Gees obliged with five songs, one of which was "How Deep Is Your Love". Barry worked out the structure for the melody with keyboard player Blue Weaver. Co-producer Albhy Galuten later admitted Weaver's contribution, calling it a song "where Blue had a tremendous amount of input. There was a lot of things from his personality. That's one where his contribution was quite significant, not in a songwriting sense, though when you play piano, it's almost like writing the song. Blue had a lot of influence in the piano structure of that song".

Weaver said:

One morning, it was just myself and Barry in the studio. He said, "Play the most beautiful chord you know" and I just played—what happened was, I'd throw chords at him and he'd say, "No, not that chord," and I'd keep moving around and he'd say, "Yeah, that's a nice one" and we'd go from there. Then I'd play another thing—sometimes I'd be following the melody line that he already had and sometimes I'd most probably lead him somewhere else by doing what I did. I think Robin came in at some point. Albhy also came in at one point and I was playing an inversion of a chord, and he said, "Oh no, I don't think it should be that inversion, it should be this," and so we changed it to that, but by the time Albhy had come in, the song was sort of there.

A demo was made at Le Château d'Hérouville in France, with additional recording done at Criteria Studios in Miami. Weaver said, "We started work about 12 o'clock—maybe one o'clock in the morning, and that demo was done at about three or four o'clock in the morning. Albhy played piano on the demo. I'd drunk too much or gone to bed or something. Then I woke up the next morning and listened to that, and then put some strings on it and that was it. Then we actually recorded it for real in Criteria. The chords and everything stayed the same. The only thing that changes from that demo is that when we got to Criteria, I worked out the electric piano part, which became the basis of the song. It was the sound of the piano that makes the feel of that song."

Of the song's lyrics, Barry said:

A lot of the textures you hear in the song were added on later. We didn't change any lyrics, mind you, but the way we recorded it was a little different than the way we wrote in the terms of construction—a little different for the better, I think. The title "How Deep Is Your Love" we thought was perfect because of all the connotations involved in that sentence, and that was simply it.

There was some talk of Yvonne Elliman recording "How Deep Is Your Love", but according to Barry, Stigwood said: "You've got to do this song yourself. You should not give it to anybody".

== Release and critical reception ==
"How Deep Is Your Love" was released as a single in September 1977 in the United States and on 14 October 1977 in the United Kingdom. By the time Children of the World was recorded, it had largely been established that Barry was the group's primary vocalist, mostly singing in falsetto and occasionally in a natural breathy voice. He even sang most of the backing vocals; Robin and Maurice are barely heard in the mix. Robin sings the melody in the chorus and various ad libs. Two videos were made for the song, with minimum lights. In one (the precursor to the main video), the brothers are shown singing while a shady image of a woman appears throughout, accompanied by a big white light. Barry is clean-shaven, as in the "Night Fever" video. In the main video, the brothers sing while passing by a stream of rainbow lights. Barry is bearded. On the Cashbox charts for 4 February 1978, when it was at No. 13, the soundtrack's second single, "Stayin' Alive", was at No. 1. "Night Fever" debuted at No. 71 on the same week.

When "How Deep Is Your Love" reached No. 3 in the UK, Barry said: "You have no idea what a thrill it is to have a Top Five single in England. With all the new wave and punk rock out, I would have thought something like 'How Deep Is Your Love' wouldn't have a chance. We always kept going forward and we're getting stronger every day".

Billboard called the song "a warm tender ballad", saying that after a slow beginning it grows to a "heightened expressive delivery." Cash Box called it "a beautifully harmonized, melodic ballad for music lovers of all ages." Record World called it "one of their most controlled, delicate efforts, with the vocals almost whispered at times", adding that it has "a good melody and expressive love lyric".

Allmusic critic Bill Janovitz praised the "sublimely gorgeous" and "impossibly lovely and memorable classic" melody, as well as Barry's vocal performance. Janovtiz felt that even though the song was released during the Bee Gees' disco period, it has more in common with their late 1960's/early 1970's hits, using "the same sort of heartbreaking major-to minor chord changes and easygoing R&B groove of such nuggets as 'To Love Somebody,' 'How Can You Mend a Broken Heart,' and 'I've Gotta Get a Message to You.'"

The song won Best Pop Performance by a Group at the 20th Grammy Awards on 23 February 1978. It was also nominated for Best Original Song at the 35th Golden Globe awards on 28 January 1978. The award went to Joe Brooks's "You Light Up My Life". During both award ceremonies, the song was in the Top 10 on the Billboard Hot 100 chart.

Brian Wilson said of the song: "I always liked the Bee Gees very much. 'How Deep Is Your Love' is [...] one that I think is really great [...] I turn the radio up a little bit when it comes on."

=== 1983 lawsuit ===
In 1983, the Chicago songwriter Ronald Selle sued the Bee Gees, claiming that the Gibb brothers stole melodic material from his song "Let It End" and used it in "How Deep Is Your Love". The jury found for Selle. The Bee Gees' attorney immediately asked for judgment notwithstanding the verdict. The basis for the motion was that Selle had failed to show, as required by law, that the Bee Gees had access to his song. Selle had said that he had sent the demo tape to only a few recording companies, none of which did business with the Bee Gees. He also admitted that there were some similarities between his song and several Bee Gee songs that predated his song, as well as similarities to the Beatles song "From Me to You", by John Lennon and Paul McCartney (under Lennon-McCartney). The federal judge ruled in the Bee Gees' favour. Selle appealed, but the appellate court upheld the ruling, agreeing that Selle had not proven his case.

== Personnel ==
Bee Gees

- Barry Gibb – lead, harmony and backing vocals, rhythm guitar
- Robin Gibb – harmony and backing vocals
- Maurice Gibb – bass guitar, harmony and backing vocals

Additional musicians

- Alan Kendall – electric guitar
- Dennis Bryon – drums, percussion
- Blue Weaver – keyboards, synthesizer, Rhodes piano
- Joe Lala – percussion
- Wade Marcus – string arrangements

Technical

- Karl Richardson – engineering
- Michel Marie – assistant engineering

== Charts ==
=== Weekly charts ===
Charts (1977–1978)	Peak position
Argentina	3
Australia (Kent Music Report)	3
Austria (Ö3 Austria Top 40)	13
Belgium (Ultratop 50 Flanders)	12
Brazil (ABPD)	1
Canada Top Singles (RPM)	1
Canada Adult Contemporary (RPM)	3
Chile	1
Finland	1
France (SNEP)	1
Ireland (IRMA)	2
Italy (FIMI)	2
Netherlands (Dutch Top 40)	8
New Zealand (Recorded Music NZ)	6
Norway (VG-lista)	5
South Africa (Springbok)	2
Spain (PROMUSICAE)	7
Sweden	4
UK Singles (Official Charts Company)	3
US Billboard Hot 100	1
US Billboard Adult Contemporary	1
US Cash Box Top 100	1
US Radio & Records	1
US Record World	2
West Germany (Media Control Charts)	21

Year	Chart	Peak position
2012	France (SNEP)	85

2025 weekly chart performance for "How Deep Is Your Love"
Chart (2025)	Peak position
Israel International Airplay (Media Forest)	9

=== Year-end charts ===
Charts (1977)	Rank
Canada Top Singles (RPM)	51
UK	19

Chart (1978)	Rank
Australia	17
Canada	53
South Africa	8
US Billboard Hot 100	6

=== All-time charts ===
Chart (1958–2018)	Position
US Billboard Hot 100	25

=== Certifications and sales ===
Region	Certification	Certified units/sales
Canada (Music Canada)	Gold	75,000^{^}
Denmark (IFPI Danmark)	Gold	45,000^{‡}
France (SNEP)	Gold	800,000
Ireland	—	25,000
Italy (FIMI) Sales since 2009	Gold	35,000^{‡}
Japan	—	70,000
New Zealand (RMNZ)	3× Platinum	90,000^{‡}
Spain (Promusicae)	Platinum	60,000^{‡}
United Kingdom (BPI)	Platinum	963,471
United States (RIAA)	Gold	1,700,000
^{^} Shipments figures based on certification alone.^{‡} Sales+streaming figures based on certification alone.

== Take That version ==
"How Deep Is Your Love"
- UK CD 1 single

Single by Take That

from the album Greatest Hits
- Released: 26 February 1996
- Genre: Pop
- Length: 3:40
- Label: RCA; BMG
- Songwriters: Barry Gibb; Robin Gibb; Maurice Gibb
- Producers: Take That; Chris Porter

Take That singles chronology
"Never Forget" (1995)	"How Deep Is Your Love" (1996)	"Patience" (2006)

Music video
- "How Deep Is Your Love" on YouTube

English pop music group Take That released a cover version as a single from its 1996 Greatest Hits compilation on RCA Records. It was the band's first single as a quartet, as Robbie Williams had left the band the previous year. The band's cover version is exactly the same as the original with the lyrics "I know your eyes in the morning sun, I feel you touch me in the pouring rain" changed to "and when you rise in the morning sun, I feel you touch my hand in the pouring rain" and "I really mean to learn" changed to "I really need to learn".

The single was produced by the band with Chris Porter and became the band's final UK number one until its 2006 comeback single "Patience". It was at number one in the UK charts for three weeks. It sold 671,000 copies and has a Platinum sales status certification in the UK. The song also topped the charts in Denmark, Israel, Ireland, Lithuania, and Spain.

In 2018, the band re-recorded an updated version of the song with Barry Gibb for its greatest hits remix album, Odyssey.

=== Critical reception ===
Music Week rated the song three out of five, writing, "This difficult-to-sing Bee Gees number lacks some oomph in this version, which is released as a preview for Take That's forthcoming greatest hits album. A hit, of course, but not one of their biggest." Gerald Martinez of New Sunday Times wrote that it sounds very much like the original, but that "most of their fans have probably not heard the Bee Gees' version. In any case it's a stylish ballad that deserves another hearing." Gina Morris from Smash Hits rated it five out of five and named it Best New Single, writing, "this is a fitting reminder of the good old times. An unplugged smoochy bongo-buoy disco record, originally recorded by the Bee Gees in the gruesome '70s for the movie Saturday Night Fever. Taken from their forthcoming Greatest Hits - Volume 1, it's a great choice of song—tampered with, but not totally destroyed."

=== Video ===
The video for "How Deep Is Your Love" was directed by English photographer Nick Brandt and shot on 7 and 8 February at a deserted warehouse and by a reservoir in Hayes, Middlesex. It was filmed six days before the band's breakup was announced and depicts the remaining four members tied to chairs in a basement.

An obsessive fan (Paula Hamilton) with blonde hair and heavy eye makeup who has presumably kidnapped the band walks into the basement and circles the four members, pulling their hair. She puts them all into a van and drives down the motorway. She stops by a reservoir and has the four members placed on the edge, pointing at each before grabbing Gary Barlow's rope and pushing him back, still holding on. Her fingers slip through the rope and he falls into the reservoir, still tied to the chair. She initially looks shocked, then smirks. MTV Europe cut some scenes of the video.

=== Track listing ===
- UK cassette single (74321 35591 5)
1. "How Deep Is Your Love" – 3:41
2. "Never Forget" (live from Earl's Court & Manchester Nynex) – 7:38
- UK CD single no. 1 (74321 35559 2)
1. "How Deep Is Your Love" – 3:41
2. "Every Guy" (live from Earl's Court & Manchester Nynex) – 5:36
3. "Lady Tonight" (live from Earl's Court & Manchester Nynex) – 4:13
4. "Sunday To Saturday" (live from Earl's Court & Manchester Nynex) – 3:48
- UK CD single no. 2 (74321 35560 2)
1. "How Deep Is Your Love" – 3:41
2. "Back for Good" (live from Earl's Court & Manchester Nynex) – 7:06
3. "Babe" (live from Earl's Court & Manchester Nynex) – 6:10
4. "Never Forget" (live from Earl's Court & Manchester Nynex) – 7:38
- European CD single no. 1 (74321 35243 2)
1. "How Deep Is Your Love" – 3:41
2. "Back For Good" (live from Earl's Court & Manchester Nynex) – 7:06
- European CD single no. 2 (74321 35244 2)
1. "How Deep Is Your Love" – 3:41
2. "Back for Good" (live from Earl's Court & Manchester Nynex) – 7:06
3. "Every Guy" (live from Earl's Court & Manchester Nynex) – 5:36
- Japanese CD single (BVCP-2406)
1. "How Deep Is Your Love" – 3:41
2. "Every Guy" (live from Earl's Court & Manchester Nynex) – 5:36
3. "Babe" (live from Earl's Court & Manchester Nynex) – 6:10
4. "Back for Good" (live from Earl's Court & Manchester Nynex) – 7:06
- UK 7-inch vinyl – jukebox release only (74321 35632 2)
1. "How Deep Is Your Love" – 3:41
2. "Never Forget" (live from Earl's Court & Manchester Nynex) – 7:38

=== Personnel ===
- Gary Barlow – lead vocals, backing vocals
- Howard Donald – backing vocals
- Jason Orange – backing vocals
- Mark Owen – backing vocals

=== Charts ===
==== Weekly charts ====
Chart (1996)	Peak position
Australia (ARIA)	12
Austria (Ö3 Austria Top 40)	7
Belgium (Ultratop 50 Flanders)	5
Belgium (Ultratop 50 Wallonia)	4
Canada Top Singles (RPM)	80
Canada Adult Contemporary (RPM)	41
Chile (IFPI)	4
Croatia (HRT)	2
Czech Republic (IFPI CR)	7
Denmark (Tracklisten)	1
Estonia (Eesti Top 20)	4
Europe (Eurochart Hot 100)	3
Europe (European AC Radio)	7
Europe (European Hit Radio)	1
Europe (Channel Crossovers)	2
Finland (Suomen virallinen lista)	2
Finland Airplay (Radiosoittolista)	9
Germany (GfK)	7
Greece (IFPI Greece)	2
Hungary (Mahasz)	4
Iceland (Íslenski Listinn Topp 40)	5
Ireland (IRMA)	1
Israel (IBA)	1
Italy (Musica e dischi)	2
Japan International (Oricon)	1
Latvia (Latvijas Top 40)	1
Lithuania (M-1)	1
Netherlands (Dutch Top 40)	6
Netherlands (Single Top 100)	7
Norway (VG-lista)	6
Poland Airplay (Music & Media)	9
Scottish Singles Sales (Official Charts)	1
Spain (AFYVE)	1
Spain Airplay (Top 40 Radio)	1
Sweden (Sverigetopplistan)	7
Switzerland (Schweizer Hitparade)	5
UK Singles (Official Charts)	1
UK Airplay (Music Week)	2

==== Year-end charts ====
Chart (1996)	Position
Australia (ARIA)	100
Belgium (Ultratop 50 Flanders)	44
Belgium (Ultratop 50 Wallonia)	35
Brazil (Crowley)	31
Europe (Eurochart Hot 100)	23
Europe (European Hit Radio)	17
Europe (Channel Crossovers)	11
Germany (Media Control)	66
Iceland (Íslenski Listinn Topp 40)	50
Israel (IBA)	14
Italy (Musica e dischi)	22
Latvia (Latvijas Top 40)	7
Netherlands (Single Top 100)	51
Norway (VG-lista)	14
Spain (AFYVE)	16
Sweden (Topplistan)	66
Switzerland (Schweizer Hitparade)	30
UK Singles (OCC)	12
UK Airplay (Music Week)	21

==== Decade-end charts ====
Decade-end chart performance for All-4-One's cover
Chart (1990–1999)	Position
UK Singles (OCC)	74

=== Certifications ===
Region	Certification	Certified units/sales
United Kingdom (BPI)	Platinum	600,000^{^}
^{^} Shipments figures based on certification alone.

=== Release history ===
Region	Date	Format(s)	Label(s)	Ref.
United Kingdom	26 February 1996	CD; cassette	RCA; BMG	
Japan	23 March 1996	CD	RCA; BMG	

== Other notable versions ==
- In 1978, Italian singer Peppino di Capri recorded an Italian-language version titled Fiore di carta (Splash, SPH 1030), included on the album Verdemela (Splash, SPL 713).
- Luther Vandross's cover of "How Deep Is Your Love" from his 1993 album Never Let Me Go was nominated for Best Male R&B Vocal Performance at the 36th Grammy Awards in 1994.
- American R&B group Portrait included a version on its album All That Matters and released it as a single on 23 May 1995. The single reached No. 93 on the Billboard Hot 100, No. 15 in Australia, and No. 1 in New Zealand for three weeks, where it was certified gold and ranked No. 6 on the year-end singles chart.
- A Muzak version of this song played at the Austin J. Tobin Plaza of the World Trade Center during the September 11 attacks, as observed in footage recorded by Jack Taliercio. The song plays as the Twin Towers burn.
- New Zealand duo Adeaze covered the song for their 2004 album Always and for Real. In 2020, it was certified gold by Recorded Music NZ (RMNZ).
- Lionel Loueke recorded the song on his 2015 album Gaïa.
- PJ Morton released a version on his 2017 album Gumbo, featuring Yebba. The song won a Grammy Award for Best Traditional R&B Performance.
- A cover of the song features in the 2024 film Kinds of Kindness, performed by Margaret Qualley's character, Vivian.
- American singer Prince Royce released a bachata cover of the song on 10 April 2025 as the lead single from his first covers album, Eterno. It debuted at numbers eight and six on the US Hot Tropical Songs and Tropical Airplay charts, respectively, becoming his 36th top-10 entry on the latter.
