= Boogie Child =

1977 single by the Bee Gees

Single by Bee Gees

from the album Children of the World
- B-side: "Lovers"
- Released: January 1977
- Recorded: 6 May 1976
- Studio: Le Studio (Quebec)
- Genre: Disco
- Length: 4:14 (album version); 3:30 (single version)
- Label: RSO
- Songwriters: Barry Gibb; Robin Gibb; Maurice Gibb
- Producers: Bee Gees; Albhy Galuten; Karl Richardson

Bee Gees singles chronology
| "Love So Right" (1976) | "Boogie Child" (1976) | "Edge of the Universe (Live)" (1977) |

"Boogie Child" is the third hit single from the Bee Gees' 1976 platinum album Children of the World, released in the US in early 1977. The song peaked at No. 12 on the Billboard Hot 100 as an A-side and was then used as the B-side of the single "Children of the World" in the UK. It was the last song recorded by the Bee Gees for their album Children of the World.

== Content ==
"Boogie Child" perhaps evolved from the unreleased "Boogie Summer" (recorded on 2 April). It was one of the two songs, alongside "Can't Keep a Good Man Down", that were the last new tracks recorded for the album. "Boogie Child" was released as a single at the start of 1977 with "Lovers" as the B-side. In the UK, RSO Records issued "Children of the World" as the third single from the album with "Boogie Child" as the B-side. In New Zealand, "Children of the World" was chosen as the B-side of this single.

In December 1976, before the release of the single, the Bee Gees performed it at their concert at The Forum, Los Angeles which appears on their first concert album Here at Last... Bee Gees... Live released in May 1977. The original audio of "Boogie Child" on that concert, which features uncredited background vocalists, was replaced by Barry's background vocals when it was mixed in April 1977 in France.

== Reception ==
Billboard described "Boogie Child" as the Bee Gees' "funkiest single to date." Cash Box said it has "a Sly-influenced lead vocal, incredibly crisp instrumentation and several emotive choruses." Record World stated, "The Ohio Players-type groove should go across the board."

== Personnel ==
- Barry Gibb – lead and backing vocals, acoustic guitar
- Maurice Gibb – bass, backing vocals
- Robin Gibb – backing vocals
- Alan Kendall – electric guitar
- Dennis Bryon – drums
- Blue Weaver – synthesizer, piano
- Peter Graves – horn
- Whit Sidener – horn
- Kenny Faulk – horn
- Neil Bonsanti – horn
- Bill Purse – horn

== Chart history ==
| Chart (1977) | Peak position |
|---|---|
| Canada Adult Contemporary (RPM) | 43 |
| Canada Top Singles (RPM) | 9 |
| New Zealand (Recorded Music NZ) | 13 |
| US Billboard Hot 100 | 12 |
| US Billboard Hot Soul Singles | 31 |
| US Cash Box | 14 |
| US Record World | 25 |
