= More Than a Woman (Bee Gees song) =

1977 song by the Bee Gees

- The Italian single release of the song, backed with "Children of the World"

Single by the Bee Gees

from the album Saturday Night Fever
- Released: 8 April 1978
- Recorded: February–September 1977
- Studio: Le Chateau (Hérouville, France); Criteria (Miami); Cherokee (Los Angeles)
- Genre: Disco
- Length: 3:15
- Label: RSO
- Songwriters: Barry Gibb; Robin Gibb; Maurice Gibb
- Producers: Bee Gees; Albhy Galuten; Karl Richardson

Lyric video
- "Bee Gees – More Than a Woman (Lyric Video)" on YouTube

"More Than a Woman" is a song by musical group the Bee Gees, written by Barry, Robin, and Maurice Gibb for the soundtrack to the film Saturday Night Fever. Released on April 8, 1978, it became a regular feature of the group's live sets from 1977 until Maurice Gibb's death in 2003, and was often coupled with "Night Fever".

== Recording and release ==
The Bee Gees started to record the song from February to March 1977 in the Château d'Hérouville, Hérouville in France, continued it in Criteria Studios in Miami in April, and later in September, the song was finished in Cherokee Studios, Los Angeles.

The soundtrack includes two versions – one by the Bee Gees and the other by Tavares. Both versions are featured in the film as well. The song has been recorded and performed by various artists and in various forms. The song by the Bee Gees was not released as a single in the US and the UK, but it was in other countries such Italy and Australia. Despite that, it has remained a staple on radio, and is one of their best known songs. An abridged live version of the song, performed by the Bee Gees in 1997, is available on both the DVD and CD versions of One Night Only.

The song has also been included on Bee Gees compilations such as Tales from the Brothers Gibb and Their Greatest Hits: The Record. The very first British pressings of Their Greatest Hits: The Record featured the song with a mastering fault, with the audio noticeably dipping to the right briefly during the first verse. This was corrected after several thousand copies had been distributed.

A new remix of the song was done by British DJ SG Lewis, which was released in 2021 in response to the TikTok craze. The song also appeared in the Glee episode titled "Saturday Night Gleever", with Cory Monteith, Naya Rivera and Chris Colfer on vocals.

== Critical reception ==
Allmusic critic Donald A. Guarisco praised "More Than a Woman" as a "strong track" for the way "the lyrics paint the narrator's need for the woman he loves in a typically dramatic Bee Gees style" while "the melody quietly mirrors intensity of the lyrics by crafting a tune that softly rises and falls to match the ebb and flow of the yearning in the lyric."

== Personnel ==
Credits adapted from the album Saturday Night Fever: The Original Movie Sound Track.

- Barry Gibb – lead vocals, guitar
- Robin Gibb – vocals
- Maurice Gibb – vocals, bass guitar
- Alan Kendall – guitar
- Dennis Bryon – drums
- Blue Weaver – keyboards
- Joe Lala – percussion

== Charts ==
=== Weekly charts ===
Chart (1978)	Peak position
Australia (Kent Music Report)	31
US Adult Contemporary (Billboard)	39

Chart (2021)	Peak position
US Hot Dance/Electronic Songs (Billboard)	6

=== Year-end charts ===
Chart (2021)	Position
US Hot Dance/Electronic Songs (Billboard)	47

== Certifications ==
Region	Certification	Certified units/sales
Denmark (IFPI Danmark)	Gold	45,000^{‡}
Italy (FIMI)	Gold	50,000^{‡}
New Zealand (RMNZ)	3× Platinum	90,000^{‡}
Spain (Promusicae)	Gold	30,000^{‡}
United Kingdom (BPI)	Platinum	600,000^{‡}
^{‡} Sales+streaming figures based on certification alone.

== Tavares version ==
"More Than a Woman"
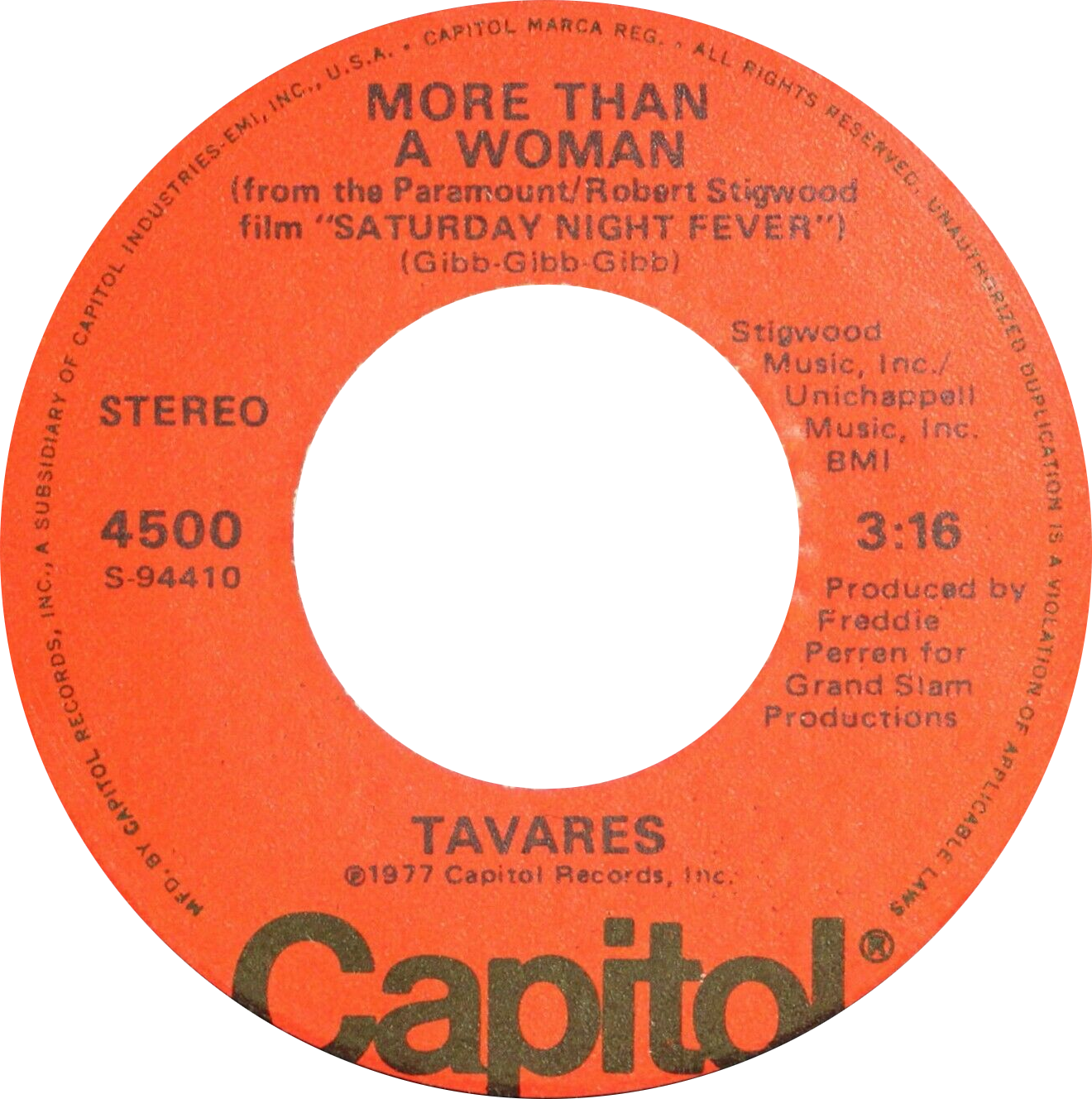
- US vinyl label

Single by Tavares

from the album Saturday Night Fever: The Original Movie Sound Track and Future Bound
- B-side: "Keep in Touch" (US); "We're Both Ready for Love" (UK)
- Released: November 1977
- Length: 3:25
- Label: Polydor; RSO; Capitol; EMI
- Songwriters: Barry Gibb; Robin Gibb; Maurice Gibb
- Producer: Freddie Perren

Tavares singles chronology
"Whodunit" (1977)	"More Than a Woman" (1977)	"One Step Away" (1977)

"More Than a Woman" was also recorded by Tavares in 1977, and also appeared in Saturday Night Fever and on the soundtrack album. It also featured on their 1978 album Future Bound. Their version charted at number 32 on the US Billboard Hot 100 and number 7 on the UK Singles Chart.

=== Charts ===
==== Weekly charts ====
Chart (1977–1978)	Peak position
Canada Top Singles (RPM)	29
Netherlands (Single Top 100)	34
UK Singles (Official Charts)	7
US Billboard Hot 100	32
US Hot Soul Singles (Billboard)	36

==== Year-end charts ====
Chart (1978)	Position
Canada Top Singles (RPM)	199

== 911 version ==
"More Than a Woman"

Single by 911

from the album There It Is and Bee Gees Tribute Album: Gotta Get a Message to You
- B-side: "Nothing Stops the Rain"; "Forever in My Heart"
- Released: 12 October 1998
- Length: 3:11
- Label: Virgin
- Songwriters: Barry Gibb; Robin Gibb; Maurice Gibb
- Producers: Phil Harding; Ian Curnow

911 singles chronology
"How Do You Want Me to Love You?" (1998)	"More Than a Woman" (1998)	"A Little Bit More" (1999)

In 1998, British boy band 911 recorded "More Than a Woman" for the Bee Gees Tribute Album: Gotta Get a Message to You. It also served as the lead single of their third studio album, There It Is (1999). Produced by Phil Harding and Ian Curnow, this version was released on 12 October 1998 and peaked at number two on the UK Singles Chart while also charting in France and New Zealand.

=== Release and reception ===
911's version of "More Than a Woman" was added to BBC Radio 1's As Featured playlist on 7 September 1998; by the end of the month, it had been upgraded to the station's A-list. On 12 October 1998, Virgin Records released the song in the United Kingdom as two CD singles and a cassette single. Six days later, the song debuted and peaked at number two on the UK Singles Chart, becoming the band's highest-charting single in the UK until the follow-up, a cover of Dr. Hook's "A Little Bit More", topped the UK chart in January 1999. For most of the week, "More Than a Woman" outsold Spacedust's "Gym and Tonic", but the latter song slipped ahead to become the number-one song of that week despite mediocre sales. "More Than a Woman" spent four weeks in the top 40 and 15 weeks in the top 100.

On the Eurochart Hot 100, the cover reached number 18 on 31 October 1998 as that week's Sales Breaker. Elsewhere in Europe, the song charted in France in March 1999, when it appeared on the SNEP Singles Chart for a single week at number 94, becoming the band's only single to chart there. In New Zealand, the song became 911's third of four songs to reach the top 50 on the New Zealand Singles Chart. After debuting at number 20 on 14 March 1999, it rose to its peak of number eight the following week to become the band's highest-charting song in New Zealand. It spent a further seven nonconsecutive weeks in the top 50.

=== Track listings ===
UK CD1

1. "More Than a Woman" (radio edit) – 3:11
2. "Nothing Stops the Rain" – 3:34
3. "Forever in My Heart" – 4:02
4. "Interactive element

UK CD2

1. "More Than a Woman" (radio edit) – 3:11
2. "Nothing Stops the Rain" – 3:34
3. "More Than a Woman" (Dave Lee's 54 mix) – 7:59

UK cassette single

1. "More Than a Woman" (radio edit) – 3:11
2. "Nothing Stops the Rain" – 3:34
3. "More Than a Woman" (Dave Lee's Rare mix) – 6:37

European CD single

1. "More Than a Woman" (radio edit) – 3:11
2. "Nothing Stops the Rain" – 3:34

=== Personnel ===
Personnel are adapted from the UK CD1 liner notes.

- Barry Gibb – writing
- Robin Gibb – writing
- Maurice Gibb – writing
- Tony Remy – guitar
- Henry Thomas – bass
- Mikeal J. Parlet – flute, saxophone
- Michele Chiavarini – keys
- Robert Anderson – percussion
- Phil Harding – production
- Ian Curnow – production
- Dave Lee – additional production and mix
- K-Boy Brooks – engineering
- John O'Donnell – engineering
- Joe @ Virgin Art – artwork design
- Richard McLaren – photography

=== Charts ===
==== Weekly charts ====
Chart (1998–1999)	Peak position
Australia (ARIA)	127
Europe (Eurochart Hot 100)	18
France (SNEP)	94
New Zealand (Recorded Music NZ)	8
Scottish Singles Sales (Official Charts)	1
Spain Airplay (Top 40 Radio)	28
UK Singles (Official Charts)	2
UK Airplay (Music Week)	8

==== Year-end charts ====
Chart (1998)	Position
UK Singles (OCC)	136
