= Come On Over (Bee Gees song) =

1975 song by Bee Gees

Song by Bee Gees

from the album Main Course
- Released: June 1975 (UK); August 1975 (US)
- Recorded: 23 January 1975; Criteria Studios, Miami, Florida
- Genre: R&B, soul, country, folk rock
- Length: 3:26
- Label: RSO Records
- Songwriters: Barry Gibb, Robin Gibb
- Producer: Arif Mardin

"Come On Over" is a ballad written by Barry and Robin Gibb and recorded by the Bee Gees for their album Main Course, with lead vocals by Robin, joined by Barry in the chorus. A live version was recorded in Los Angeles during their Children of the World Tour and appeared on their first live album Here at Last...Bee Gees...Live. The song was more reminiscent of their older style as compared to the new R&B sound of "Jive Talkin'" and "Nights on Broadway". It would become a No.1 adult contemporary hit for Olivia Newton-John in 1976.

Rolling Stone critic Stephen Holden said that the Bee Gees' version sounds "characteristically sugary".

== Olivia Newton-John version ==
"Come On Over"

Single by Olivia Newton-John

from the album Come On Over
- B-side: "Small Talk and Pride"
- Released: March 1976
- Genre: Country pop
- Length: 3:38
- Label: MCA(Australia) EMI(E.E.U.U.)
- Songwriters: Barry Gibb, Robin Gibb
- Producer: John Farrar

Olivia Newton-John singles chronology
"Let It Shine" (1975)	"Come On Over" (1976)	"Jolene" (1976)

In 1976, Olivia Newton-John recorded a version and released it as the lead single from her seventh studio album of the same name. It peaked at No.23 on the Billboard Hot 100 and was Newton-John's sixth No.1 in a row on the Easy Listening chart, for one week in April 1976. "Come On Over" peaked at No.5 on the US country chart and No.3 in New Zealand.

=== Track listing ===
1. "Come On Over" - 3:41
2. "Small Talk and Pride" - 3:54

=== Charts ===
Chart (1976)	Peak position
Australian (Kent Music Report)	55
Canadian RPM Top Singles	22
Canadian RPM Adult Contemporary	5
Canadian RPM Country Tracks	3
Israel (Israeli Singles Chart)	23
New Zealand (RIANZ)	3
US Billboard Hot 100	23
US Billboard Easy Listening	1
US Billboard Hot Country Singles	5
U.S. Cash Box Top Singles	30

== See also ==
- List of number-one adult contemporary singles of 1976 (U.S.)
