= Come On Over (Olivia Newton-John album) =

Studio album by Olivia Newton-John
- Released: March 1976
- Recorded: October–November 1975
- Studios: Abbey Road Studios, London
- Genres: Country; country pop
- Length: 41:10
- Label: MCA
- Producer: John Farrar

Olivia Newton-John chronology
| Clearly Love (1975) | Come On Over (1976) | Don't Stop Believin' (1976) |

Singles from Come On Over
- 1. "Come on Over" Released: March 1976; 2. "Jolene" Released: 1976

Professional ratings
Review scores
| Source | Rating |
|---|---|
| AllMusic | 3.5/5 stars |

Come On Over is the eighth studio album by British-Australian singer Olivia Newton-John, released in March 1976. The album peaked at number two on the US Top Country Albums chart and number 13 on the US Billboard 200. This album received positive reviews at the time of its release.

== Singles ==
The lead single released from the album was the title song, written by Barry Gibb and Robin Gibb and originally featured on the Bee Gees' 1975 album Main Course. It was a moderate pop hit, peaking at number 23 on the US Billboard Hot 100, but did much better on the country (number 5) and adult contemporary (seventh of ten number 1 singles) charts. In New Zealand, the title track reached number 3.

The album's first track, a cover of Dolly Parton's "Jolene", was only released as a single in Japan, and it became a hit there, peaking at number 11 on the Oricon Singles Chart. The album itself was also a success in the Japanese market, reaching the number 2 position on the Oricon Albums Chart. It was released in Australia in 1978 where it peaked at number 29.

The album also included versions of the traditional song "Greensleeves" and the Beatles' "The Long and Winding Road" (the ending track), as well as "Who Are You Now?", originally featured in the 1973 film Hurry Up, or I'll Be 30. Besides Parton's "Jolene" the album also boasts covers of recent country hits by Willie Nelson ("Blue Eyes Crying in the Rain") and Lynn Anderson ("Smile for Me").

== Reception ==
Billboard called it a "good, romantic set," noting "the obvious attempts at country don't really work, but the straight pop ballads come off well. Usual strong orchestration and form fitting production from John Farrar and continued improved singing from Newton-John. Best material comes from the pens of the Bee Gees and Rory Bourke, though Farrar has written a couple of good songs."

Cash Box said "The constantly maturing vocals of Olivia Newton-John continue their musical growth on Come On Over. Ms. Newton-John puts effective emotion into every song and when played off against clear instrumentals, strikes an effective tone on ballad and uptempo numbers alike."

Allmusic called it a "consistent and entertaining project," noting "what this record becomes is a textbook on the separation between what is good and what is great. The album is quality stuff through and through."

== Track listing ==
Side one
| No. | Title | Writer(s) | Length |
|---|---|---|---|
| 1. | "Jolene" | Dolly Parton | 3:07 |
| 2. | "Pony Ride" | Diane Berglund; Jim Phillips | 3:58 |
| 3. | "Come on Over" | Barry Gibb; Robin Gibb | 3:38 |
| 4. | "It'll Be Me" | John Farrar; Hank Marvin | 3:28 |
| 5. | "Greensleeves" | Traditional | 3:40 |
| 6. | "Blue Eyes Crying in the Rain" | Fred Rose | 2:22 |

Side two
| No. | Title | Writer(s) | Length |
|---|---|---|---|
| 7. | "Don't Throw It All Away" | Gary Benson; David Mindel | 2:54 |
| 8. | "Who Are You Now?" | Bruce Hart; Stephen Lawrence | 2:54 |
| 9. | "Smile for Me" | Rory Bourke; Phil Keat | 3:05 |
| 10. | "Small Talk and Pride" | Farrar | 3:50 |
| 11. | "Wrap Me in Your Arms" | Harlan Collins | 3:04 |
| 12. | "The Long and Winding Road" | John Lennon; Paul McCartney | 4:24 |

Japan 2010 SHM-CD bonus tracks
| No. | Title | Length |
|---|---|---|
| 13. | "Jolene" (live in Osaka, Japan, December 1976) | 3:13 |
| 14. | "Pony Ride" (live in Osaka, Japan, December 1976) | 3:50 |

== Personnel ==
=== Musicians ===
- Olivia Newton-John – lead vocals, arrangements (5)
- Steve Gray – keyboards, orchestra arrangements and conductor
- Graham Todd – keyboards
- John Farrar – acoustic guitar, electric guitars, backing vocals
- Alan Parker – acoustic guitar
- B.J. Cole – steel guitar
- Les Hurdle – bass
- Alan Tarney – bass
- Brian Bennett – drums
- David Katz – orchestra contractor
- Vicki Brown – backing vocals
- Pat Farrar – backing vocals
- Clare Torry – backing vocals
- The Queen Singers – vocal group (5)

=== Production ===
- Producer – John Farrar
- Engineers – Tony Clark, John Kurlander, Allan Rouse and Michael Stavroes
- Recorded at Abbey Road Studios (London, England)
- Mixed at AIR Studios (London, England)
- Tape Operator – John Walls
- Photography – Jeff Dunas
- Art direction and design – George Osaki

== Charts ==
=== Weekly charts ===
| Chart (1976) | Peak position |
|---|---|
| Australian Albums (Kent Music Report) | 30 |
| Canada Top Albums/CDs (RPM) | 30 |
| Japanese Albums (Oricon) | 2 |
| New Zealand Albums (RMNZ) | 12 |
| UK Albums (Official Charts) | 49 |
| US Billboard 200 | 13 |
| US Top Country Albums (Billboard) | 2 |
| US Cash Box Top Albums | 15 |
| US Cash Box Country Albums | 1 |

=== Year-end charts ===
| Chart (1976) | Position |
|---|---|
| Japanese Albums (Oricon) | 9 |
| New Zealand Albums (RMNZ) | 40 |
| US Top Country Albums (Billboard) | 30 |
| Chart (1977) | Position |
| Japanese Albums (Oricon) | 12 |

== Certifications and sales ==
| Region | Certification | Certified units/sales |
|---|---|---|
| Canada (Music Canada) | Platinum | 100,000^{^} |
| Hong Kong (IFPI Hong Kong) | Gold | 10,000^{*} |
| Japan (Oricon Charts) | — | 371,000 |
| United States (RIAA) | Gold | 500,000^{^} |
^{*} Sales figures based on certification alone.^{^} Shipments figures based on certification alone.
