= You Should Be Dancing =

1976 single by Bee Gees

Single by Bee Gees

from the album Children of the World
- B-side: "Subway"
- Released: 22 June 1976
- Recorded: 19 January–1, 8 February 1976; 6 May 1976
- Studio: Criteria (Miami); Le Studio (Morin Heights, Quebec)
- Genre: Disco
- Length: 4:16 (single version); 4:47 (12" version)
- Label: RSO
- Songwriters: Barry Gibb; Robin Gibb; Maurice Gibb
- Producers: Bee Gees, Albhy Galuten, Karl Richardson

Bee Gees singles chronology
"Fanny (Be Tender with My Love)" (1976)	"You Should Be Dancing" (1976)	"Love So Right" (1976)

Music video
- "You Should Be Dancing (Audio)" on YouTube

"You Should Be Dancing" is a song by the Bee Gees, from the album Children of the World, released in 1976. It hit No. 1 for one week on the American Billboard Hot 100, No. 1 for seven weeks on the US Hot Dance Club Play chart, and in September the same year, reached No. 5 on the UK Singles Chart. The song also peaked at No. 4 on the Billboard Soul chart. It was this song that first launched the Bee Gees into disco. It was also the only track from the group to top the dance chart.

It is also one of six songs performed by the Bee Gees included in the Saturday Night Fever movie soundtrack, which came out a year later.

== Origin ==
"You Should Be Dancing" was recorded on 19 January, 1 and 8 February, and 6 May 1976 with Barry Gibb providing lead vocals in falsetto. Barry had developed his falsetto to a remarkable degree in the ten months since the release of "Baby As You Turn Away" from the Main Course album on which he sang a full song in falsetto for the first time (except for its chorus). Keyboardist Blue Weaver recalls that Maurice Gibb wrote the bass line and sang the horn parts to the brass players, while Barry sang parts for Weaver to play, and guitarist Alan Kendall got in a short guitar solo for its instrumental break.

Stephen Stills was also at Criteria Studios recording the album, Long May You Run, with his band and Neil Young. Stills added percussion on the song's February sessions. Members of Stills's backing band, George Perry (bass) and Joe Lala (percussion), also worked with the Bee Gees on some songs.

== Music and lyrics ==
Allmusic critic Donald A. Guarisco said that "You Should Be Dancing" "represents the poppier side of disco at its most infectiously catchy." The lyrics on the verses extol a woman who likes disco music, and the chorus tells the listener to "hit the dancefloor" with the lyrics "What you doin' on your back?/You should be dancing".

== Reception ==
Billboard described "You Should Be Dancing" as a "strong, uptempo disco cut" with the Bee Gees' "strongest singing since "Jive Talkin'." Cash Box said that "the playing is more polished [than 'Jive Talking'], and the band does some things to the vocals, with trading off, which are highly ear-catching." Record World called it an "across the board smash" saying "'Get off your back, you should be dancing' they sing and there's no resisting the stomping beat." Rolling Stone critic Joe McEwen called it "an impossibly propulsive track, whose only rival in the genre is KC's 'Get Down Tonight.'"

Guarisco said that the song "blended all the thrills of good up-tempo disco with strong pop hooks" and especially praised the "stellar, surprisingly hard-rocking guitar solo midway through, an element one might not expect in a dance tune."

== Charts ==
The song was their third Billboard Hot 100 No. 1 and their sixth No. 1 in Canada. It ended as the No. 31 song of the year. In the 1970s some of the Bee Gees' songs were deemed too uptempo for AC/Easy Listening Radio which led to "You Should Be Dancing" only reaching No. 25 on that chart. It also hit No. 4 in Ireland. In Australia, where the brothers spent a number of years in their youth, it managed only to nick the top 20.

"You Should Be Dancing" is known today as the first chart-topper in which Barry Gibb uses his now-trademark falsetto in a lead vocal (he had previously used it on the top 10 "Nights on Broadway" and on "Fanny (Be Tender with My Love)"). Earlier songs, such as "Jive Talkin'", had Gibb use a melodic blue-eyed soul vocal style.

=== Weekly charts ===
Chart (1976–1977)	Peak position
Australia (Kent Music Report)	20
Belgium (Ultratop 50 Flanders)	20
Canada Adult Contemporary (RPM)	9
Canada Top Singles (RPM)	1
Finland (Suomen Virallinen)	26
France (SNEP)	13
France (IFOP)	24
Germany (GfK)	16
Ireland (IRMA)	4
Italy (Musica e Dischi)	5
Netherlands (Dutch Top 40)	17
Netherlands (Single Top 100)	15
New Zealand (Recorded Music NZ)	10
Norway (VG-lista)	11
Sweden (Sverigetopplistan)	8
UK Singles (Official Charts)	5
US Billboard Adult Contemporary	25
US Billboard Hot 100	1
US Billboard Hot Dance Club Play	1
US Billboard Hot Soul Singles	4
US Cash Box Top 100	1
US Record World	4

Chart (2012)	Peak position
Belgium (Back Catalogue Singles Flanders)	31
France (SNEP)	143

Chart (2020)	Peak position
US Hot Dance/Electronic Songs (Billboard)	19

=== Year-end charts ===
Chart (1976)	Position
Canada Top Singles (RPM)	15
US Billboard Hot 100	31
US Cash Box	34

== Certifications ==
Region	Certification	Certified units/sales
Canada (Music Canada)	Gold	75,000^{^}
New Zealand (RMNZ)	Platinum	30,000^{‡}
United Kingdom (BPI)	Gold	400,000^{‡}
United States (RIAA)	Gold	1,000,000^{^}
^{^} Shipments figures based on certification alone.^{‡} Sales+streaming figures based on certification alone.

== Personnel ==
Credits adapted from the album Saturday Night Fever: The Original Movie Sound Track.

- Barry Gibb – vocals, guitar
- Robin Gibb – vocals
- Maurice Gibb – vocals, bass guitar
- Alan Kendall – guitar
- Dennis Bryon – drums
- Blue Weaver – keyboards
- Joe Lala − percussion
- George Perry − percussion
- Stephen Stills – additional percussion

== E. Sensual version ==
"B.G. Tips - You Should Be Dancing"

Single by E. Sensual
- B-side: "Remix"
- Released: 1995
- Length: 3:30
- Label: Dance Pool
- Songwriters: Barry Gibb; Robin Gibb; Maurice Gibb; Dylan Burns

E. Sensual singles chronology
"B.G. Tips - You Should Be Dancing" (1995)	"Check Me Out" (1996)

Music video
- "B.G. Tips - You Should Be Dancing" on YouTube

In 1995, E. Sensual released a cover, titled "B.G. Tips - You Should Be Dancing", which reached number three in Hungary and number four in Finland.

=== Track listing ===
Europe: CD maxi (1995)

1. B.G.Tips – You Should Be Dancing (Radio Edit) (3:30)
2. B.G.Tips – You Should Be Dancing (Vocal Club Mix) (6:09)
3. B.G.Tips – You Should Be Dancing (Original Mix) (8:08)

France: CD maxi (Remixes, 1995)

1. B.G.Tips – You Should Be Dancing (DJ Albert Radio Edit) (3:49)
2. B.G.Tips – You Should Be Dancing (Radio Edit) (3:26)
3. B.G.Tips – You Should Be Dancing (Euro Mix) (6:06)
4. B.G. Tips – You Should Be Dancing (DJ Albert Progressive House Mix) (7:19)
5. B.G. Tips – You Should Be Dancing (Original Mix 1) (8:06)
6. B.G. Tips – You Should Be Dancing (Original Mix 2) (7:12)

=== Charts ===
Chart (1995)	Peak position
Australia (ARIA)	38
Europe (Eurochart Hot 100)	73
Finland (Suomen virallinen lista)	4
France (SNEP)	26
Hungary (Mahasz)	3
Iceland (Íslenski Listinn Topp 40)	36
Sweden (Sverigetopplistan)	39
UK Club Chart (Music Week)	29
UK Pop Tip Club Chart (Music Week)	4

== Blockster version ==
"You Should Be..."

Single by Blockster
- Released: 4 January 1999
- Label: Ministry of Sound
- Songwriters: Barry Gibb; Robin Gibb; Maurice Gibb
- Producer: Blockster

Blockster singles chronology
"You Should Be..." (1999)	"Grooveline" (1999)

British DJ Blockster released a cover of the song, titled "You Should Be...", on 4 January 1999. It reached number three on the UK Singles Chart the same month. By doing so, it marked the first time that two songs written by the Gibb brothers had charted within the UK top three simultaneously, as Steps' cover of "Tragedy" was at number two during that week.

=== Critical reception ===
Daily Record wrote, "This was one of the big club floor-fillers last year. Another hit proving that a few words, a catchy melody and big bass sound seems to equal a hit."

=== Charts ===
==== Weekly charts ====
Chart (1999)	Peak position
Belgium (Ultratip Bubbling Under Flanders)	7
Canada Dance/Urban (RPM)	11
Europe (Eurochart Hot 100)	17
Ireland (IRMA)	19
Scottish Singles Sales (Official Charts)	6
UK Singles (Official Charts)	3

==== Year-end charts ====
Chart (1999)	Position
UK Singles (OCC)	140

== Other cover versions ==
The Bee Gees remixed the song in 1993 for their album Size Isn't Everything, under the title "Decadance".

Jessie J, Tinie Tempah and Taio Cruz performing "You Should Be Dancing" in 2012 Summer Olympics closing ceremony. It was heard at the end of the 2010 animated film Despicable Me.

American rock band Foo Fighters, under the alter ego "Dee Gees", covered the song on BBC Radio 2's Sofa Session. The song can be found on their album Hail Satin.

For its third season American TV series Glee covered this song as part of its tribute episode to Saturday Night Fever, titled "Saturday Night Glee-ver". Darren Criss, Heather Morris, and Harry Shum Jr. provided lead vocals as their characters Blaine Anderson, Brittany Pierce, and Mike Chang.

== See also ==
- List of Billboard Hot 100 number-one singles of 1976
- List of number-one dance singles of 1976 (U.S.)
- List of number-one singles of 1976 (Canada)
