= Night Fever =

1978 single by the Bee Gees

- UK seven-inch single

Single by Bee Gees

from the album Saturday Night Fever
- B-side: "Down the Road" (live)
- Released: January 1978 (US)
- Recorded: c. April 1977; September 1977
- Studio: Château d'Hérouville (France); Criteria (Miami)
- Genre: Disco
- Length: 3:32
- Label: RSO
- Songwriters: Barry Gibb; Robin Gibb; Maurice Gibb
- Producers: Bee Gees; Albhy Galuten; Karl Richardson

Bee Gees singles chronology
"Stayin' Alive" (1977)	"Night Fever" (1978)	"Too Much Heaven" (1978)

Audio sample
- "Night Fever": file; help

Music video
- "Night Fever" on YouTube

"Night Fever" is a song written and performed by the Bee Gees. It first appeared on the soundtrack to Saturday Night Fever on RSO Records. The song bounded up the Billboard charts while the Bee Gees’ two previous hits from Saturday Night Fever soundtrack ("How Deep Is Your Love" and "Stayin' Alive") were still in the top ten.

The record debuted on the Billboard Hot 100 Chart at #76, then leaped up 44 positions to #32. It then moved: 32–17–8–5–2–1. It remained at #1 for eight weeks (the most for any single that year), and ultimately spent 13 weeks in the top 10. For the first five weeks that "Night Fever" was at #1, "Stayin' Alive" was at #2. Also, for one week in March, songs written by Barry Gibb held five of the top ten positions on the Hot 100 chart, and four of the top five positions, with "Night Fever" at the top of the list. The B-side of "Night Fever" is a live version of "Down the Road" taken from the Bee Gees' 1977 album, Here at Last... Bee Gees... Live.

== Inspiration and writing ==
When Bee Gees manager Robert Stigwood was producing a movie about a New York disco scene, the working title for the film at that time was Saturday Night. Stigwood asked the group to write a song using that name as a title, but the Bee Gees disliked it. They had already written a song called "Night Fever", so the group convinced Stigwood to use that and change the film to Saturday Night Fever.

The string intro of "Night Fever" was inspired by "Theme from A Summer Place" by Percy Faith, according to keyboardist Blue Weaver. As Weaver explains the history behind this song:

...'Night Fever' started off because Barry walked in one morning when I was trying to work out something. I always wanted to do a disco version of Theme from A Summer Place by the Percy Faith Orchestra or something - it was a big hit in the Sixties. I was playing that, and Barry said, 'What was that?' and I said, 'Theme from A Summer Place', and Barry said, 'No, it wasn't'. It was new. Barry heard the idea - I was playing it on a string synthesizer and sang the riff over it.

— Blue Weaver

Barry Gibb, Robin Gibb and Maurice Gibb completed the lyrics for "Night Fever" sitting on a staircase (reminiscent of their first international hit "New York Mining Disaster 1941", which was also written in a staircase back in 1967).

== Recording ==
The Bee Gees began recording the song by April 1977 in France and finished it in September the same year. A demo of "Night Fever" with some instrumental and vocals heard on it exists and was available to download on Rhino Records' website in 2009 or earlier.

...For 'Night Fever' the group had the hook-line and rhythm - they usually pat their legs to set up a song's rhythm when they first sing it - and parts of the verses. They had the emotion, same as on the record. We put down battery first, so the feel was locked in. The electric piano part was put on before the bass, then the heavy guitar parts. We had the sound, but we needed something there to shake it so we used the thunder sound.

— Albhy Galuten

== Reception ==
According to Billboard, it has a "jumping disco beat" and a "smooth falsetto lead" vocal. Cash Box similarly said that it has "dancin' beat, scratchy guitar, sweeping orchestration and the familiar falsetto." Record World predicted that it would become "another dance tempo hit" for the Bee Gees.

According to AllMusic critic Donald A. Guarisco, the lyrics "a disco fan looking for love on the dancefloor" and the song "convincingly recreates the euphoria disco fans feel while dancing to their beloved music" with lyrics such as "Here I am prayin' for this moment to last/Livin' on the music, so fine." Guarisco praised the song's hooks, rhythm. string arrangement and falsetto harmonies, concluding that the "combination of hip lyrics and an infectious melody truly capture the appeal of disco.".

== Legacy ==
The song replaced Andy Gibb's "Love Is Thicker Than Water" at number one and was in turn replaced by Yvonne Elliman's "If I Can't Have You"—all of which were written and produced by the Gibb brothers. It would be the third of six consecutive US number-ones for the band, tying the Beatles for the record for most consecutive number-one singles. Billboard ranked it as the No. 2 song for 1978, behind Andy Gibb's "Shadow Dancing".

"Night Fever" topped the UK Singles Chart for two weeks, their third UK number-one, and in the US it remained the number-one Billboard Hot 100 single for over two months in 1978. In addition to Saturday Night Fever, the song appeared in the movie and on the soundtrack for Mystery Men. The song is listed at number 38 on Billboard's All Time Top 100. It is also featured in other films including Luna, Mr. Saturday Night, I.D., Whatever Happened to Harold Smith? and Avenue Montaigne.

== Music video ==
A music video was made for the song in 1978 but not shown to the public until 26 years later, in 2004. It features the brothers singing the song in a darkened studio, layered over background video filmed while driving along "Motel Row" on Collins Avenue, a 3-mile (5 km) motel strip in what is now Sunny Isles Beach, Florida. Most of the motels which appear in the video are now closed or demolished.

== Personnel ==
- Barry Gibb – lead, harmony and backing vocals, rhythm guitar
- Lee Ritenour - rhythm guitar
- Robin Gibb – harmony and backing vocals
- Maurice Gibb – bass, harmony and backing vocals
- Alan Kendall – lead guitar
- Dennis Bryon – drums
- Blue Weaver – Fender Rhodes electric piano, harpsichord, piano, and ARP String Ensemble

== Charts ==
=== Weekly charts ===
Chart (1978)	Peak position
Australia (Kent Music Report)	7
Austria (Ö3 Austria Top 40)	4
Belgium (Ultratop 50 Flanders)	3
Brazil (ABPD)	1
Canada Top Singles (RPM)	1
Canada Adult Contemporary (RPM)	1
Finland (Suomen virallinen lista)	6
Irish Singles Chart	1
Italy	5
Japan (Oricon)	3
Mexico (Mexican Airplay)	2
Netherlands (Dutch Top 40)	3
Netherlands (Single Top 100)	3
New Zealand (Recorded Music NZ)	2
Norway (VG-lista)	2
Portugal (Musica & Som)	4
South African Chart	2
Spain (PROMUSICAE)	1
Sweden (Sverigetopplistan)	5
Switzerland (Schweizer Hitparade)	3
UK Singles (Official Charts Company)	1
US Billboard Hot 100	1
US Adult Contemporary (Billboard)	19
US Hot Dance Club Play (Billboard)	3
US Hot R&B Singles (Billboard)	8
US Cash Box Top 100	1
West Germany (GfK)	2

Chart (2012)	Peak position
France (SNEP)	108

Chart (2020)	Peak position
US Hot Dance/Electronic Songs (Billboard)	15

=== Year-end charts ===
Chart (1978)	Rank
Australia (Kent Music Report)	53
Canada Top Singles (RPM)	1
Netherlands (Dutch Top 40)	38
Netherlands (Single Top 100)	21
New Zealand	9
South Africa	12
Switzerland	15
UK	7
US Billboard Hot 100	2
US Cash Box Top 100	1

=== All-time charts ===
Chart (1958–2018)	Position
US Billboard Hot 100	42

== Certifications and sales ==
Region	Certification	Certified units/sales
Canada (Music Canada)	Platinum	150,000^{^}
Denmark (IFPI Danmark)	Gold	45,000^{‡}
France	—	300,000
Italy (FIMI) sales since 2009	Gold	50,000^{‡}
Japan	—	500,000
New Zealand (RMNZ)	2× Platinum	60,000^{‡}
Spain (Promusicae)	Gold	30,000^{‡}
United Kingdom (BPI)	Platinum	650,000
United States (RIAA)	Platinum	2,500,000
^{^} Shipments figures based on certification alone.^{‡} Sales+streaming figures based on certification alone.

== Ex-It version ==
"Night Fever"

Single by Ex-It
- Released: 20 April 1996
- Recorded: 1996
- Genre: Eurodance
- Length: 3:45
- Label: BMG
- Songwriters: Barry, Robin & Maurice Gibb, Robinson, Andreas Hötter, Alexander Stiepel
- Producers: Robinson, Andreas Hötter, Alexander Stiepel

Ex-It singles chronology
"I Want It All" (1996)	"Night Fever" (1996)

In 1996, the Austrian music group Ex-It covered the song and made a small notable success. Large parts of the original were retained in this version, but with many rap passages added. This cover is the compilations Dance Now! 14, Maxi Dance Sensation 21 and Hot Hits [TL 541/35].

=== Music video ===
The music video copies many elements of the movie Saturday Night Fever and satirizes the same. At the beginning of the video, the DJ plays the song, while the protagonist and his girlfriend in a tool shop look around and watch a radio. They then prepare for a visit to a disco and are seen dancing throughout the rest of the video.

=== Charts ===
Chart (1996)	Peak position
Australia (ARIA Charts)	82
Austrian Singles Chart	30
