= Thomas J. Valentino =

American businessman (1907–1986)

- Born: April 27, 1907; Palermo, Sicily, Italy
- Died: August 4, 1986; New York City, United States
- Occupations: Businessman, music publisher, sound effects pioneer
- Years active: 1920s–1980s
- Known for: Founder of Valentino Inc., pioneer of sound effects and production music libraries
- Notable work: Valentino Sound Effects Library, Valentino Production Music Library
- Awards: Grammy award (1979, co-producer of Saturday Night Fever)

Thomas J. Valentino (April 27, 1907 – August 4, 1986) was an Italian-born American businessman, who was among the first to compile libraries of tape recorded sound effects and music.

== Biography ==
Valentino was born in the outskirts of Palermo, Sicily, Italy. His family immigrated to the U.S. in 1911. He began his career in the 1920s as a piano and organ tuner for Wurlitzer on trans-Atlantic steamers docking in New York. In the 1930s, he created live sound effects for Broadway productions, while becoming a sales representative for Gennett Recordings. He started his own sound effects company, Thomas J. Valentino Inc., which was later shortened to Valentino Inc. He provided the sound effects for many Broadway shows, including The Heiress, Death of a Salesman, The Diary of Anne Frank, and The Glass Menagerie, eventually compiling a library of sound cues for hundreds of live shows. His sound effects library at the time was also available on 78 RPM records, which were sold to radio stations during the 1930s and 1940s, at the time effectively being the only broadcasting outlets. With the advent of television, the "Valentino Sound Effects Library" was marketed during the 1950s under the Major record label, and became the preeminent source for pre-recorded sound effects for the broadcasting industry.

In 1958 he expanded into a similar product for music, establishing the "Valentino Production Music Library" under the Major label.

Valentino published, produced, or acquired copyrights to an extensive collection of music, with Major's music library being used in thousands of movies, television shows, cable productions, and educational and industrial recordings around the world. Eventually the work of over 125 composers was represented by the company variously under publishing arms affiliated with ASCAP (Thomas J. Valentino Inc.) and BMI (RFT Music Publishing).

In the mid-1970s, Valentino increasingly published contemporary music, entering the popular disco style of the period. He commissioned a student at the Manhattan School of Music, Walter Murphy, to compose several popular music themes to add to the music library. A disco version of Beethoven's Fifth Symphony - "A Fifth of Beethoven" - became a No. 1 hit on the Billboard Hot 100 in 1976. "A Fifth of Beethoven" was included in the soundtrack album of the movie Saturday Night Fever, which sold over 40 million copies over the years. With most of the songs done by the Bee Gees, this album ranks as the No. 1 best-selling soundtrack of all time.

Valentino served as a vice president of the Recording Industry Association of America (R.I.A.A.) during that time, and received the 1979 Grammy award as co-producer of the Album of the Year for the Saturday Night Fever soundtrack.
