= Children of the World =

Studio album by the Bee Gees
- Released: 13 September 1976
- Recorded: 19 January – 6 May 1976
- Studios: Criteria Studios (Miami, Florida, US); Le Studio (Morin Heights, Canada)
- Genres: Disco; R&B
- Length: 38:37
- Label: RSO
- Producers: Bee Gees; Albhy Galuten; Karl Richardson

The Bee Gees chronology
Main Course (1975)	Children of the World (1976)	Here at Last... Bee Gees... Live (1977)

Singles from Children of the World
- 1. "You Should Be Dancing" Released: 22 June 1976; 2. "Love So Right" Released: September 1976; 3. "Boogie Child" Released: January 1977; 4. "Children of the World" Released: February 1977

Children of the World is the fourteenth studio album (twelfth internationally) by the Bee Gees, released in 1976 by RSO Records. The first single, "You Should Be Dancing", went to No. 1 in the US and Canada, and was a top ten hit in numerous other territories. The album was re-issued on CD by Reprise Records and Rhino Records in 2006. This was the first record featuring the Gibb-Galuten-Richardson production team which would have many successful collaborations in the following years. Many consider this a "prologue" to the band's foray into disco, which would culminate with the Saturday Night Fever Soundtrack the following year, on which they are prominently featured. (The Saturday Night Fever Soundtrack includes You Should Be Dancing, originally released on this album.)

== Background ==
Because their manager Robert Stigwood had ended his US distribution arrangement with Atlantic Records, Atlantic producer Arif Mardin, who had produced the Bee Gees' prior two albums, was no longer permitted to work with the group. In an effort to retain the same sound, the group recorded at the same studios (Criteria Studios in Miami). At first, they recruited producer Richard Perry, but they parted company after only a couple of weeks over the musical direction the group should take. At this point the Bee Gees decided to produce the album themselves, with Barry Gibb taking the lead role, along with engineer Karl Richardson. They added young musician and arranger Albhy Galuten to the control room as musical adviser. The new team saw the group through a series of top-selling recordings over the next four years.

== Recording ==
The album was recorded from 19 January to 30 March, at Criteria Studios in Miami, when they recorded "You Should Be Dancing", "Love So Right", "Subway", "Love Me", "You Stepped Into My Life", "The Way It Was", "Walk Before You Run" (unreleased), "The Feel" (unreleased) and "Lovers" which had Robin singing lead in falsetto. All the songs were finished in Quebec, except the two unreleased songs and "Walk Before You Run" which was written by Barry Gibb with Stephen Stills. During a break recording Children of the World, Robin and Maurice Gibb returned in England to spend time with their families, while Barry stayed in Miami to mix the new single and to record "The Way It Was". From 2 April to 26 May, the group recorded songs in Le Studio, Quebec. "Rest Your Love on Me" (recorded 2 May) was not included on the album but it was used as the B-side of "Too Much Heaven" in 1978.

== Release ==
The album was released in September 1976. Four singles were released: "You Should Be Dancing" in June 1976 (UK) / July 1976 (US); "Love So Right" in September 1976; "Boogie Child" in January 1977; and "Children of the World" in February 1977. "You Should Be Dancing" went to No. 1 in the US. "Love So Right" and "Boogie Child" reached No. 3 and No. 12 respectively in the US. "Love Me" was a hit for Yvonne Elliman and "You Stepped into My Life" was recorded by Melba Moore in 1978 and by Wayne Newton in 1979. Barry Gibb felt that other tracks could also be hits.

== Critical reception ==
Professional ratings
Review scores
Source	Rating
AllMusic	4/5 stars
Christgau's Record Guide	B
Encyclopedia of Popular Music	3/5 stars
The Great Rock Discography	5/10
The Rolling Stone Album Guide	3/5 stars

Bruce Eder, in a retrospective review for AllMusic, described this album as the group's second R&B album and described "Love So Right" as a "beautiful soul ballad".

== Track listing ==
All tracks written by Barry, Robin and Maurice Gibb, except where noted.

Side one
No.	Title	Lead vocal(s)	Length
1.	"You Should Be Dancing"	Barry	4:16
2.	"You Stepped Into My Life"	Barry	3:25
3.	"Love So Right"	Barry	3:34
4.	"Lovers"	Barry and Robin	3:36
5.	"Can't Keep a Good Man Down"	Barry and Robin	4:43

Side two
No.	Title	Writer(s)	Lead vocal(s)	Length
1.	"Boogie Child"		Barry	4:12
2.	"Love Me"	Barry Gibb, Robin Gibb	Robin and Barry	4:01
3.	"Subway"		Barry	4:24
4.	"The Way It Was"	Barry Gibb, Robin Gibb, Blue Weaver	Barry	3:19
5.	"Children of the World"		Barry	3:07

== Personnel ==
Bee Gees

- Barry Gibb – vocals, rhythm guitar
- Robin Gibb – vocals
- Maurice Gibb – harmony and backing vocals, bass (except “Subway” and “The Way It Was”)

Backing band

- Blue Weaver – keyboards, acoustic piano, ARP synthesizers, Moog synthesizers
- Alan Kendall – guitars
- Dennis Bryon – drums

Additional musicians

- George "Chocolate" Perry – bass on “Subway” and “The Way It Was”
- Stephen Stills – percussion on “You Should Be Dancing”
- Joe Lala – percussion
- Gary Brown – saxophone
- Borneroo Horns (Neil Bonsanti, Bill Purse, Whit Sidener, Peter Graves, Kenny Faulk) – horns

=== Production ===
- Bee Gees – producers
- Albhy Galuten – co-producer
- Karl Richardson – co-producer, engineer
- John Blanche – assistant engineer
- Nick Blagona – assistant engineer
- Ed Mashal – assistant engineer
- George Marino – mastering at Sterling Sound (New York, NY)
- Ed Caraeff – art direction, design, photography
- Tom Nikosey – cover typeface

== Charts ==
=== Weekly charts ===
Chart (1976–1977)	Peak position
Australian Albums (Kent Music Report)	16
Canada Top Albums/CDs (RPM)	3
German Albums (Offizielle Top 100)	36
New Zealand Albums (RMNZ)	6
Norwegian Albums (VG-lista)	16
Swedish Albums (Sverigetopplistan)	22
US Billboard 200	8
US Top R&B/Hip-Hop Albums (Billboard)	23

=== Year-end charts ===
Chart (1976)	Position
Canada Top Albums/CDs (RPM)	30
Chart (1977)	Position
New Zealand Albums (RMNZ)	37
US Billboard 200	24

== Certifications and sales ==
Region	Certification	Certified units/sales
Canada (Music Canada)	Platinum	100,000^{^}
United States (RIAA)	Platinum	1,000,000^{^}
^{^} Shipments figures based on certification alone.
