= Fanny (Be Tender with My Love) =

Single by Bee Gees

from the album Main Course
- B-side: "Country Lanes"
- Released: December 1975
- Recorded: 30 January, 17, 19 February 1975
- Studio: Criteria (Miami)
- Genre: R&B; soul; soft rock
- Length: 4:02 (album version); 3:26 (single version)
- Label: RSO
- Songwriter: Barry, Robin & Maurice Gibb
- Producer: Arif Mardin

Bee Gees singles chronology
| "Nights on Broadway" (1975) | "Fanny (Be Tender with My Love)" (1975) | "You Should Be Dancing" (1976) |

"Fanny (Be Tender with My Love)" is a song written and performed by the Bee Gees for their Main Course album in 1975. It was the third single release from the album, peaking at number 12 on the United States Billboard Hot 100 and number two in Canada. According to Maurice Gibb, producer Quincy Jones called "Fanny" one of his favorite R&B songs of all time.

== Inspiration and recording ==
It was written by Barry Gibb, Robin Gibb, and Maurice Gibb. In a 2001 Billboard magazine interview with the Bee Gees, Barry claimed that

We had a housecleaner named Fanny when we stayed at 461 Ocean Blvd. [in North Miami Beach] during the making of Main Course. We were sitting in the lounge at Criteria [Studios] writing the song with the lyric idea, 'Be tender with my love'. Maurice turned round and saw Fanny and said, 'Wouldn't it be a better song if it was a woman's name in there, and you're asking her to be tender?

Recording for "Fanny" took place on 30 January, the same day as "Jive Talkin'", "Songbird", and "All This Making Love". Additional recording took place February 17 or 19, when Barry began using his falsetto lead vocal on Fanny. Fanny repeats the idea of a contrasting quieter section as in "Nights on Broadway". The complexity of falsetto and natural harmonies would become a Bee Gees trademark culminating with 1979's Spirits Having Flown. The key of this song in the end, was from keyboardist Blue Weaver. Weaver was influenced by Hall & Oates' 1973 LP Abandoned Luncheonette as he later admits, "The key change in 'Fanny (Be Tender)' was a complete rip-off from Abandoned Luncheonette from 'She's Gone' [also produced by Mardin], I only had it on tape, and I didn't know that Arif produced it".

== Critical reception ==
Cash Box called it a "soulful composition" that "appears to be the third monster single in a row for these pop masters" off the Main Course album. Record World said that "the Brothers Gibb return to their old heavenly harmony sound." Billboard said that the group switched from the disco style of their previous two singles "to a ballad format and [came] up with a fine example of their patented harmonies" and noted that the change "works well". Rolling Stone critic Stephen Holden said that it "boast[s] spacious disco arrangements against which the Bee Gees overdub skillful imitations of black falsetto."

The group did not perform "Fanny" live because of the layers of harmonies used to create the studio recording. A promotional film for distribution was recorded at the same location as "Jive Talkin'".

In an interview for Billboard magazine on 14 November 2001, Maurice Gibb claimed: "We all love that one, but it's just a bitch to sing". Bruce Eder of Allmusic describes "Fanny" along with "Baby As You Turn Away" as possessing the same exquisitely sung sense of romantic drama as "Lonely Days" and "How Can You Mend a Broken Heart".

== Chart performance ==
=== Weekly charts ===
| Chart (1976) | Peak position |
|---|---|
| Australia (Kent Music Report) | 61 |
| Belgium (Ultratop 50 Flanders) | 29 |
| Canada Top Singles (RPM) | 2 |
| Canada RPM Adult Contemporary | 1 |
| Germany (Media Control Charts) | 42 |
| New Zealand (Recorded Music NZ) | 7 |
| US Billboard Hot 100 | 12 |
| US Billboard Adult Contemporary | 9 |
| US Cash Box | 9 |
| US Radio & Records | 8 |
| US Record World | 10 |

=== Year-end charts ===
| Chart (1976) | Rank |
|---|---|
| Canada | 36 |
| New Zealand | 37 |
| US Billboard Hot 100 | 79 |
| US Cash Box | 68 |
