= Love So Right =

1976 single by the Bee Gees

Single by Bee Gees

from the album Children of the World
- B-side: "You Stepped Into My Life"
- Released: September 1976
- Recorded: 18 January, 8 February 1976; 8 May 1976
- Studio: Criteria (Miami); Le Studio (Quebec)
- Genre: R&B; soul; soft rock
- Length: 3:34 (album); 3:19 (single)
- Label: RSO
- Songwriter: Barry, Robin & Maurice Gibb
- Producers: Bee Gees, Albhy Galuten, Karl Richardson

Bee Gees singles chronology
"You Should Be Dancing" (1976)	"Love So Right" (1976)	"Boogie Child" (1977)

"Love So Right" is an R&B ballad recorded by the Bee Gees. It was the second single released on the album Children of the World.

== Background ==
It was written by Barry, Robin and Maurice Gibb early in 1976. Recording started on 18 January, then 8 February and finished on 8 May in Quebec, Canada with the other songs "Can't Keep a Good Man Down", "Boogie Child", "Subway", "The Way It Was" and "You Should Be Dancing". It was the second consecutive Bee Gees single (following "You Should Be Dancing") to feature Barry Gibb's falsetto exclusively for lead vocals. Barry later stated that the song's R&B influence was inspired by the group "trying to be The Delfonics."

== Release ==
"Love So Right" hit number three on the Billboard Hot 100 as well as charting on the Billboard Adult Contemporary chart. In addition, it was a minor hit on the Billboard Black Singles chart, peaking at number 37. Its B-side was "You Stepped into My Life". In Canada, "You Stepped into My Life" was chosen as the A-side and this song was the B-side.

== Reception ==
Cash Box said that "the R&B flavor is still there, so the appeal is across the board" and "those famous harmonies are in full force." Record World said that while it is "slower and not as overtly disco" as the Bee Gees' previous single "You Should Be Dancing", "there appears to be no way they could miss with material like this." Rolling Stone critic Joe McEwen called it "a frothy pop ballad modeled closely after [the Bee Gees'] own 'Fanny,' and the current record's only saving grace is a whiny soul falsetto, somewhere between Tony Washington of the Dynamic Superiors and the Stylistics' Russell Tompkins."

== Track listing ==
Original release
No.	Title	Length
1.	"Love So Right"	3:19
2.	"You Stepped Into My Life"	3:25

US promo single
No.	Title	Length
1.	"Love So Right" (stereo version)	3:19
2.	"Love So Right" (mono version)	3:19

== Chart performance ==
=== Weekly charts ===
Chart (1976–1977)	Peak position
Australia Kent Music Report	28
Brazilian Singles Chart	1
Canadian RPM Singles Chart	2
Germany Media Control Charts	38
Irish Singles Chart	14
UK The Official Charts Company	41
US Billboard Hot 100	3
US Billboard Easy Listening	14

=== Year-end charts ===
Chart (1977)	Rank
Canada	105
US Billboard Hot 100	80

== Certifications ==
Region	Certification	Certified units/sales
Canada (Music Canada)	Gold	75,000^{^}
United States (RIAA)	Gold	1,000,000^{^}
^{^} Shipments figures based on certification alone.
