= Main Course =

Studio album by the Bee Gees
- Released: May 1975 (US); August 1975 (UK)
- Recorded: 6 January – 21 February 1975
- Studios: Criteria (Miami); Atlantic (New York)
- Genres: Pop soul; disco; funk; R&B; country
- Length: 40:56
- Labels: RSO, Capitol Records (2020 vinyl reissue)
- Producer: Arif Mardin

The Bee Gees chronology
| Mr. Natural (1974) | Main Course (1975) | Children of the World (1976) |

Singles from Main Course
- 1. "Jive Talkin'" Released: May 1975; 2. "Nights on Broadway" Released: September 1975; 3. "Fanny (Be Tender with My Love)" Released: January 1976

Main Course is the thirteenth studio album (eleventh worldwide) by the Bee Gees, released in 1975 by RSO Records. It was the group's last album to be released by Atlantic Records in the US under its distribution deal with Robert Stigwood. This album marked a great change for the Bee Gees as it was their first album to include mostly R&B, soul, disco and funk-influenced songs, and created the model for their output through the rest of the 1970s. It rejuvenated the group's career and public image, particularly in the US, after the commercial disappointment of their preceding albums. Main Course was the first album to feature keyboardist Blue Weaver who had just left the Strawbs and toured with Mott the Hoople. The album cover with the band's new logo designed by US artist Drew Struzan made its first appearance here.

== Background ==
Working with Atlantic producer Arif Mardin, who had also produced their previous album, Mr. Natural, and engineer Karl Richardson at Criteria Studios in Miami, their music became much more influenced by funk sound over a base of R&B style being produced in Miami at the time. Main Course also featured the first prominent use of Barry Gibb's falsetto. From Mr. Natural, the brothers retained new drummer Dennis Bryon and longtime lead guitarist Alan Kendall but added a new keyboard player, Bryon's former Amen Corner colleague Blue Weaver, who would become one of only a small handful of non-Gibb musicians to receive composition credits on Bee Gees songs. At the suggestion of Eric Clapton, the Bee Gees moved to Criteria Studios in Miami, to start recording their next album. Barry recalled Clapton's suggestion when he was trying to make a comeback: "Eric said, 'I've just made an album called 461 Ocean Boulevard in Miami. Why don't you guys go to America and do the same and maybe the change of environment will do something for you?' I think it was really good advice."

Maurice Gibb, on the other hand, cites their manager Robert Stigwood as the first to suggest Miami as the best place to record new songs. "He [Robert] showed us the picture on the cover [of 461 Ocean Boulevard] and said, 'You can rent that place and live there and record and get a sun tan.' We decided that it was our big chance to get serious about our music again so we went out there and did Main Course."

== Recording ==
According to producer Arif Mardin, when the Bee Gees arrived in Florida to record new material, he discovered that at the time, they were listening to a lot of American R&B groups' songs; as Mardin was known as an R&B producer, he suggested that they also listen to several high-charting R&B artists such as Stevie Wonder for an idea as to the kind of music he felt they should be making.

The band's sound became more technologically current with Mardin's incorporation of modern synthesizers and dual bass lines (the synthesizer bass was played by Blue Weaver and bass guitar by Maurice Gibb) on many of the songs, which started when Weaver decided to overdub a synthesizer bass line on the original demo of "Jive Talkin'." Weaver later commented that "nothing new has been invented to make such a tremendous difference to the sound as the synthesizer did, compared to an orchestra."

At first, the brothers were still writing in their old ways, with many of the songs being slower rock ballads. The first song recorded for the album was an unreleased track "Was It All in Vain?". The next songs recorded were "Country Lanes" and "Wind of Change". After co-producer Robert Stigwood heard these songs, he urged them to record in a more R&B style and "Wind of Change" was re-recorded again in February in its more familiar version. Another unreleased track, "Your Love Will Save the World" was recorded on 9 January, though it was later recorded by Percy Sledge. Once the Gibb brothers changed their style of writing, songs like "Jive Talkin'", "Nights on Broadway" and "Edge of the Universe" were recorded with an R&B influence, though ballads like "Songbird" and "Come on Over" were more country than R&B. The final song recorded for the album was "Baby As You Turn Away" which featured Barry singing the verses in falsetto, though not the strong falsetto which he would develop and use on future songs like "You Should Be Dancing" and "Stayin' Alive".

== Release ==
Professional ratings
Review scores
| Source | Rating |
|---|---|
| AllMusic | 4.5/5 stars |
| Christgau's Record Guide | B+ |
| Encyclopedia of Popular Music | 4/5 stars |
| The Great Rock Discography | 7/10 |
| Rolling Stone | (ambivalent) |
| The Rolling Stone Album Guide | 3.5/5 stars |

The album peaked at No. 14 on the US Billboard album chart in 1975 and remained on Billboard's Top 200 albums chart for 74 weeks until December 1976 on the strength of its three singles that charted on Billboard's single chart: "Fanny (Be Tender with My Love)" at No. 12, "Nights on Broadway" at No. 7, and "Jive Talkin'" at No. 1. A live version of a fourth song, "Edge of the Universe" from the album Here at Last... Bee Gees... Live, reached No. 26. "Come on Over" later became a moderate hit (#23) in a cover version by country/pop artist Olivia Newton-John. The album also peaked No. 1 at the Canada's RPM Albums Chart.

== Track listing ==
All tracks written by Barry and Robin Gibb, with additional writers noted.

Side one
| No. | Title | Writer(s) | Lead vocal(s) | Length |
|---|---|---|---|---|
| 1. | "Nights on Broadway" | Maurice Gibb | Barry and Robin | 4:36 |
| 2. | "Jive Talkin'" | Maurice Gibb | Barry | 3:47 |
| 3. | "Wind of Change" | | Barry and Robin | 5:01 |
| 4. | "Songbird" | Maurice Gibb, Blue Weaver | Barry | 3:35 |
| 5. | "Fanny (Be Tender with My Love)" | Maurice Gibb | Barry | 4:06 |

Side two
| No. | Title | Writer(s) | Lead vocal(s) | Length |
|---|---|---|---|---|
| 1. | "All This Making Love" | | Barry and Robin | 3:03 |
| 2. | "Country Lanes" | | Robin (with Barry) | 3:31 |
| 3. | "Come On Over" | | Robin and Barry | 3:27 |
| 4. | "Edge of the Universe" | | Barry and Robin | 5:25 |
| 5. | "Baby As You Turn Away" | Maurice Gibb | Barry | 4:29 |

== Personnel ==
Bee Gees

- Barry Gibb – lead, harmony, and backing vocals; rhythm guitar
- Robin Gibb – lead, harmony, and backing vocals
- Maurice Gibb – harmony and backing vocals, bass guitar, lead and rhythm guitars

Bee Gees band

- Blue Weaver – keyboards, synthesizers, synth bass
- Alan Kendall – lead guitar, steel guitar
- Dennis Bryon – drums, percussion

Additional musicians and production

- Joe Farrell – tenor saxophone on "Winds of Change"
- Ray Barretto – congas on "Wind of Change"
- Don Brooks – harmonica on "Songbird"
- Strings conducted by Gene Orloff
- Produced and arranged by Arif Mardin
- Engineered by Karl Richardson and Lew Hahn

== Charts ==
=== Weekly charts ===
Weekly chart performance for Main Course
| Chart (1975–76) | Peak position |
|---|---|
| Australian Albums (Kent Music Report) | 29 |
| Canada Top Albums/CDs (RPM) | 1 |
| German Albums (Offizielle Top 100) | 29 |
| New Zealand Albums (RMNZ) | 36 |
| Spanish Albums (AFE) | 8 |
| US Billboard 200 | 14 |

=== Monthly charts ===
Monthly chart performance for Main Course
| Chart (1977) | Peak position |
|---|---|
| Soviet International Albums (MK) | 1 |

=== Year-end charts ===
1975 year-end chart performance for Main Course
| Chart (1975) | Peak position |
|---|---|
| Canada Top Albums/CDs (RPM) | 25 |

1976 year-end chart performance for Main Course
| Chart (1976) | Peak position |
|---|---|
| Canada Top Albums/CDs (RPM) | 8 |
| US Billboard 200 | 24 |

== Certifications and sales ==
| Region | Certification | Certified units/sales |
|---|---|---|
| Canada (Music Canada) | 2× Platinum | 200,000^{^} |
| United States (RIAA) | Gold | 500,000^{^} |
^{^} Shipments figures based on certification alone.
