= Saturday Night Fever (soundtrack) =

Saturday Night Fever: The Original Movie Soundtrack

Soundtrack album by the Bee Gees and various artists
- Released: November 15, 1977
- Recorded: 1975–1977
- Studios: Château d'Hérouville, France; The Mom & Pops Company Store, Studio City, Los Angeles; The Burbank Studios, Burbank, California; Criteria Studios, Miami, Florida; Le Studio, Quebec
- Genre: Disco
- Length: 76:00
- Label: RSO
- Producers: Bee Gees; Karl Richardson; Albhy Galuten; Freddie Perren; Thomas J. Valentino; Bill Oakes; David Shire; Ralph MacDonald; William Salter; K. G. Productions; Arif Mardin; Harry Wayne Casey; Richard Finch; Bobby Martin; Broadway Eddie; Ron Kersey

Bee Gees chronology
Here at Last... Bee Gees... Live (1977)	Saturday Night Fever: The Original Movie Soundtrack (1977)	Spirits Having Flown (1979)

Singles from Saturday Night Fever
- 1. "How Deep Is Your Love" Released: September 1977; 2. "More Than a Woman (Tavares)" Released: November 1977; 3. "Stayin' Alive" Released: December 1977; 4. "If I Can't Have You" Released: January 1978; 5. "Night Fever" Released: January 1978; 6. "Boogie Shoes" Released: January 1978; 7. "More Than a Woman (Bee Gees)" Released: April 1978; 8. "Manhattan Skyline" Released: June 1978

Saturday Night Fever: The Original Movie Soundtrack is the soundtrack double album (in 2 Long Play records) from the 1977 film Saturday Night Fever starring John Travolta. The soundtrack was released on November 15, 1977, by RSO Records. Prior to the release of Thriller by Michael Jackson, Saturday Night Fever was the best-selling album in music history, and still ranks among the best-selling soundtrack albums worldwide, with sales figures of over 40 million copies.

In the United States, the album was certified 16× Platinum for shipments of at least 16 million units. The album stayed atop the charts for 24 straight weeks from January to July 1978 and stayed on Billboard's album charts for 120 weeks until March 1980. In Canada the album was on the charts from December 17, 1977, to December 9, 1978, and was number 1 for 22 weeks. Three singles from the album contributed by the Bee Gees—"How Deep Is Your Love", "Stayin' Alive" and "Night Fever"—along with Yvonne Elliman's "If I Can't Have You", all reached No. 1 in the US. In the UK, the album spent 18 consecutive weeks at No. 1. The album epitomized the disco phenomenon on both sides of the Atlantic and was an international sensation. The album was added to the National Recording Registry by the Library of Congress in 2012 for being "culturally, historically, and/or aesthetically significant".

== Writing and recording ==
The Bee Gees' involvement in the film did not begin until post-production. As John Travolta asserted, "The Bee Gees weren't even involved in the movie in the beginning ... I was dancing to Stevie Wonder and Boz Scaggs."

Producer Robert Stigwood commissioned the Bee Gees to create the songs for the film. Robin Gibb recalled:

We were recording our new album in the north of France. And we'd written about and recorded about four or five songs for the new album when Stigwood rang from L.A. and said, 'We're putting together this little film, low budget, called Tribal Rites of a Saturday Night. Would you have any songs on hand?', and we said, 'Look, we can't, we haven't any time to sit down and write for a film'. We didn't know what it was about.

The brothers wrote the songs "virtually in a single weekend" at Château d'Hérouville studio in France. The first song they recorded was "If I Can't Have You", but their version was not used in the film.

Barry Gibb remembered the reaction when Stigwood and music supervisor Bill Oakes arrived and listened to the demos:

They flipped out and said these will be great. We still had no concept of the movie, except some kind of rough script that they'd brought with them ...

Maurice Gibb recalled, "We played him demo tracks of 'If I Can't Have You', 'Night Fever' and 'More Than a Woman'. He asked if we could write it more discoey."

The Brothers Gibb then wrote a song called "Saturday Night" but as Maurice explains,

There were so many songs called 'Saturday Night', even one by the Bay City Rollers, so when we rewrote it for the movie, we called it 'Stayin' Alive'.

The track was recorded at Criteria Studios, with Maurice Gibb playing a bass line similar to the guitar riff, Barry Gibb and Alan Kendall on guitar riffs, and Blue Weaver on synthesizers. Barry chose to sing falsetto on the whole song, except on the line "life’s going nowhere, somebody help me".

Dennis Bryon, who was a backing drummer, left in the middle of the session due to the death of his mother, so the group looked for a replacement. However, as there was a shortage of qualified drummers in the area, they tried out a drum machine, with unsatisfactory results. After listening to the drum track of the already-recorded "Night Fever", they took two bars from that track, and re-recorded them as a loop.

According to the DVD commentary for Saturday Night Fever, the producers intended to use the song "Lowdown" by Boz Scaggs in the rehearsal scene between Tony and Stephanie in the dance studio, and choreographed their dance moves to the song. However, representatives for Scaggs's label, Columbia Records, refused to grant legal clearance for it, as they wanted to pursue another disco movie project, which never materialized. Composer David Shire, who scored the film, had to, in turn, write a song to match the dance steps demonstrated in the scene and eliminate the need for future legal hassles. However, this track does not appear on the movie's soundtrack.

== Commercial performance ==
At the time, Saturday Night Fever with Grease held the record for biggest preorders in Netherlands with 150,000 records sold.

== Release ==
The original issue of the album included the original studio version of "Jive Talkin'"; later LP pressings included a version culled from Here at Last ... Bee Gees ... Live. All CD releases have included the original "Jive Talkin'". "Jive Talkin'" was to have been used in a deleted scene taking place the day after Tony Manero's first Saturday night at the disco, but as the sequence was cut for the final film, the song was cut as well. In addition to the Bee Gees songs, additional incidental music was composed and adapted by David Shire. Three of Shire's cues – "Manhattan Skyline", "Night on Disco Mountain" (based on the classical piece "Night on Bald Mountain") and "Salsation" – are included on the soundtrack album as well. Five additional cues – "Tony and Stephanie", "Near the Verrazano Bridge" (both adapted from the Bee Gees' song "How Deep Is Your Love"), "Barracuda Hangout", "Death on the Bridge" and "All Night Train" – while heard in the film, remain unreleased on CD. In 1995, the soundtrack was re-released on CD through Polydor Records. In 2006, the album was re-released on Reprise Records as part of the Bee Gees' regaining control of their master tapes.

To commemorate the movie's 40th anniversary, Capitol Records released a newly remastered version (however, the first disc is the same remaster used for the 1995 Polydor release) on April 21, 2017, with the original artwork and gatefold packaging.

On November 17, 2017, a deluxe box set was released with the original soundtrack, 4 new mixes of "Stayin' Alive", "Night Fever", "How Deep Is Your Love" and "You Should Be Dancing", a collector's book, art prints, a movie poster and a turntable mat.

== Reception and legacy ==
Professional ratings
Review scores
Source	Rating
AllMusic	5/5 stars
Christgau's Record Guide	B+
Encyclopedia of Popular Music	4/5 stars
The Great Rock Discography	8/10
Pitchfork	8.7/10
The Rolling Stone Album Guide	5/5 stars
Select	4/5 medals

Along with the success of the movie, the soundtrack, composed and performed primarily by the Bee Gees, is the second best-selling soundtrack album of all time after the soundtrack to The Bodyguard. Saturday Night Fever had a large cultural impact in the United States. The Bee Gees had originally written and recorded five of the songs used in the film – "Stayin' Alive", "Night Fever", "How Deep Is Your Love", "More Than a Woman" (performed in the film in two different versions – one version by Tavares, and another by the Bee Gees) and "If I Can't Have You" (performed in the movie by Yvonne Elliman) as part of a regular album. They had no idea at the time they would be making a soundtrack and said that they basically lost an album in the process. Two previously released Bee Gees songs – "Jive Talkin'" and "You Should Be Dancing" – are also included on the soundtrack (the cassette version used a live version of "Jive Talkin'"). Other previously released songs from the disco era round out the music in the movie. Rick Dees' single "Disco Duck", and another song by Dees, "Dr. Disco", both appear in the film, but are not included on the soundtrack album. In all, there were seven top 40 soundtrack singles that were released from late 1977-March 1978.

The soundtrack won the Grammy Award for Album of the Year. It is the only disco album to do so, and one of only three soundtrack albums so honored. In 2012, the album was ranked No. 132 on Rolling Stone magazine's list of "The 500 Greatest Albums of All Time", ranked again in a 2020 revised list at number 163. The soundtrack hit the No. 1 spot on the Billboard chart's Pop Album and Soul Album charts. In 2003 the TV network VH1 named it the 57th greatest album of all time, and it was ranked 80th in a 2005 survey held by British television's Channel 4 to determine the 100 greatest albums of all time. Pitchfork Media listed Saturday Night Fever as the 34th best album of the 1970s.

The album was added to the National Recording Registry in the Library of Congress on March 21, 2013 for preservation.

== Track listing ==
The album is divided into two LP records. Performers are listed in parentheses. All tracks on Record one are written by Barry, Robin, and Maurice Gibb, except where noted.

=== Record one ===
Side one
No.	Title	Producer(s)	Length
1.	"Stayin' Alive" (Bee Gees)	Bee Gees; Karl Richardson; Albhy Galuten	4:45
2.	"How Deep Is Your Love" (Bee Gees)	Bee Gees; K. Richardson; A. Galuten	4:03
3.	"Night Fever" (Bee Gees)	Bee Gees; K. Richardson; A. Galuten	3:33
4.	"More Than a Woman" (Bee Gees)	Bee Gees; K. Richardson; A. Galuten	3:17
5.	"If I Can't Have You" (Yvonne Elliman)	Freddie Perren	3:00

Side two
No.	Title	Writer(s)	Producer(s)	Length
1.	"A Fifth of Beethoven" (Walter Murphy)	W. Murphy^{[a]}; Beethoven	Thomas J. Valentino	3:02
2.	"More Than a Woman" (Tavares)		F. Perren	3:16
3.	"Manhattan Skyline" (David Shire)	D. Shire	Bill Oakes; D. Shire	4:44
4.	"Calypso Breakdown" (Ralph MacDonald)	William Eaton	R. MacDonald; William Salter	7:50
Total length:				37:30

=== Record two ===
Side three
No.	Title	Writer(s)	Producer(s)	Length
1.	"Night on Disco Mountain" (David Shire)	Modest Mussorgsky; D. Shire^{[b]}	B. Oakes; D. Shire	5:12
2.	"Open Sesame" (Kool & the Gang)	Robert Bell; Kool & the Gang	K.G. Productions	4:01
3.	"Jive Talkin'" (Bee Gees)	B. Gibb; R. Gibb; M. Gibb	Arif Mardin	3:45
4.	"You Should Be Dancing" (Bee Gees)	B. Gibb; R. Gibb; M. Gibb	Bee Gees; K. Richardson; A. Galuten	4:17
5.	"Boogie Shoes" (KC and the Sunshine Band)	Harry Wayne Casey; Richard Finch	H. W. Casey; R. Finch	2:16

Side four
No.	Title	Writer(s)	Producer(s)	Length
1.	"Salsation" (David Shire)	D. Shire	B. Oakes; D. Shire	3:50
2.	"K-Jee" (MFSB)	Charles Hearndon; Harvey Fuqua	Bobby Martin; Broadway Eddie	4:12
3.	"Disco Inferno" (The Trammps)	Leroy Green; Ron Kersey	R. Kersey	10:52
Total length:				38:25

Notes

- ^{^a} arranged and conducted by Walter Murphy based on Beethoven's Fifth Symphony
- ^{^b}adapted and arranged by David Shire based on "Night on Bald Mountain" by Modest Mussorsgky

=== Outtakes ===
All tracks are performed by the Bee Gees, except where noted.

No.	Title	Writer(s)	Length
1.	"Emotion" (Samantha Sang)	Barry Gibb; Robin Gibb	3:43
2.	"If I Can't Have You"	B. Gibb; R. Gibb; Maurice Gibb	3:25
3.	"(Our Love) Don't Throw It All Away"	B. Gibb; Blue Weaver	4:07
4.	"Warm Ride"	B. Gibb; R. Gibb; M. Gibb	3:16
5.	"Lowdown" (Boz Scaggs)	Boz Scaggs; David Paich	5:16

== Personnel ==
Adapted from the album's liner notes.

Performers

- Barry Gibb – vocals (1–4, 12, 13), guitar (1–4, 13), rhythm guitars (12)
- Robin Gibb – vocals (1–4, 12, 13)
- Maurice Gibb – vocals (1–4, 13), bass guitar (1–12, 13), rhythm guitar (12), electric guitar (12)
- Yvonne Elliman – lead vocals (5)
- Walter Murphy – performer and conductor (6)
- Tavares – performers (7)
- Ralph MacDonald – performer (9)
- Kool & the Gang – performers (11)
- KC and the Sunshine Band – performers (14)
- M.F.S.B. – performers (16)
- The Trammps – performers (17)

Additional musicians

- Dennis Bryon – drums (1–4, 12, 13), percussion (12)
- Blue Weaver – keyboards (1–4, 12, 13), synthesizers (12)
- Alan Kendall – guitar (1–4, 13), electric guitars (12), steel guitar (12)
- Joe Lala – percussion (1, 4, 13)
- Sonny Burke – piano (5, 7, 8), electric keyboards (15)
- Bob Bowles – guitar (5, 7)
- Scott Edwards – bass guitar (5, 7, 10, 15)
- James Gadson – drums (5, 7, 8)
- Bob Zimmitti – percussion (5, 7), timbales (15)
- Paulinho Da'Costa – percussion (5, 7)
- Freddie Perren – percussion and synthesizer (5)
- Julia Tillman Waters; Maxine Willard Waters; Marti McCall – backup vocals (5)
- Lee Ritenour – guitars (8, 10, 15)
- Mitch Holder – guitars (8)
- Michael Boddicker – synthesizer (8, 10)
- Abraham Laboriel – bass guitar (8)
- Steve Forman – percussion (8, 10), Latin percussion (15)
- Jimmy Getzoff – concertmaster (8, 10)
- Dennis Budimir – guitars (10)
- Ralph Grierson – keyboards (10)
- Mike Baird – drums (10)
- Emil Richards – percussion (10), Latin percussion (15)
- George Perry – percussion (13)
- Eddie Cano – acoustic piano (15)
- Mark Stevens – drums (15)
- Chino Valdez – congas (15)
- Jerome Richardson – flute solo (15)
- Tony Terran – trumpet solo (15)

Production

- Freddie Perren – rhythm arrangements (5, 7)
- Wade Marcus – horn and string arrangements (5, 7)
- Nathan Kaproff – orchestra contractor (8, 10, 15)
- Bill Oakes – album supervision, compilation
- Wally Traugott – mastering (at Capitol Records, Hollywood)
- Susan Herr; Tom Nikosey – art preparation
- Norman Seeff – Yvonne Elliman photo
- Francesco Scavullo – Bee Gees photo
- Charles W. Bush – Tavares photo

Producers

- Bee Gees; Karl Richardson; Albhy Galuten (1–4, 13)
- Freddie Perren (5, 7)
- Thomas J. Valentino (6)
- Bill Oakes; David Shire (8, 10, 15)
- Ralph MacDonald; William Salter (9)
- K. G. Productions (11)
- Arif Mardin (12)
- Harry Wayne Casey; Richard Finch (14)
- Bobby Martin; Broadway Eddie (16)
- Ron Kersey (17)

Arrangers

- Walter Murphy (6)
- David Shire (8, 10, 15)
- Harry Wayne Casey; Richard Finch (14)
- Bobby Martin (16)
- Ron Kersey (17)

Engineers

- Karl Richardson (1–4, 12, 13)
- Larry Miles; Steve Pouliot (5, 7)
- Danny Wallin (8, 10, 15)

Assistant engineers

- Michel Marie (1–4)
- Tyrone Williams; Jim Nau (5)
- Jerry Crawford (8, 10, 15)
- John Blanch; Ed Marshal (Miami); Nick Blacona (Quebec) – 13

== Awards ==
=== Grammy Awards ===
Year	Nominee / work	Award	Result
1978	"How Deep Is Your Love"	Best Pop Vocal Performance by a Group	Won
1979	Saturday Night Fever	Album of the Year	Won
1979	Saturday Night Fever	Best Pop Vocal Performance by a Duo or Group	Won
1979	"Stayin' Alive"	Best Arrangement of Voices	Won
1979	Barry Gibb, Albhy Galuten, Karl Richardson (producers)	Producer of the Year	Won
2004	Saturday Night Fever	Hall of Fame Award	Won

=== American Music Awards ===
Year	Nominee / work	Award	Result
1979	Saturday Night Fever	Favorite Soul/R&B album	Won

== Charts ==
=== Weekly charts ===
Chart (1977–1978)	Peak position
Australian Albums (Kent Music Report)	1
Austrian Albums (Ö3 Austria)	1
Canada Top Albums/CDs (RPM)	1
Finnish Albums (Suomen Virallinen)	1
Dutch Albums (Album Top 100)	1
German Albums (Offizielle Top 100)	1
Italian Albums (Musica e dischi)	1
Japanese Albums (Oricon)	1
New Zealand Albums (RMNZ)	1
Norwegian Albums (VG-lista)	1
Portuguese Albums (Musica & Som)	1
Spanish Albums (El Gran Musical)	1
Swedish Albums (Sverigetopplistan)	1
UK Albums (Official Charts)	1
US Billboard 200	1
US Soul LP's (Billboard)	1

=== Year-end charts ===
Chart (1978)	Position
Australian Albums (Kent Music Report)	1
Austrian Albums (Ö3 Austria)	1
Canada Top Albums/CDs (RPM)	1
Dutch Albums (Album Top 100)	1
German Albums (Offizielle Top 100)	1
Japanese Albums (Oricon)	3
New Zealand Albums (RMNZ)	1
UK Albums (OCC)	1
US Billboard 200	1
Chart (1979)	Position
US Billboard 200	27

=== Decade-end charts ===
Chart (1970–79)	Position
Japanese Albums (Oricon)	9
UK Albums (OCC)	8

== Certifications and sales ==
Region	Certification	Certified units/sales
Argentina	—	100,000
Australia (ARIA)	11× Platinum	830,000
Austria	—	70,000
Belgium	—	200,000
Brazil (Pro-Música Brasil)	Gold	150,000
Canada (Music Canada) Various Artists	Diamond	1,400,000
Canada (Music Canada) Bee Gees	4× Platinum	400,000^{^}
Colombia	—	15,000
Finland	—	30,000
France (SNEP)	Gold	1,350,000
Germany (BVMI)	3× Platinum	1,750,000
Greece	—	120,000
Hong Kong (IFPI Hong Kong)	Platinum	70,000
India	—	250,000
Ireland	—	25,000
Italy	—	1,000,000
Italy (FIMI) sales since 2009	Gold	25,000^{*}
Japan (Oricon Charts)	—	693,000
Malaysia	—	20,000
Mexico	—	800,000
Netherlands (NVPI)	Platinum	650,000
New Zealand (RMNZ)	2× Platinum	250,000
Norway	—	180,000
Spain	—	300,000
Sweden	—	150,000
Switzerland	—	135,000
United Kingdom (BPI)	7× Platinum	2,200,000
United States (RIAA)	16× Platinum	16,000,000^{‡}
Summaries
Southeast Asia	—	150,000
Worldwide	—	40,000,000
^{*} Sales figures based on certification alone.^{^} Shipments figures based on certification alone.^{‡} Sales+streaming figures based on certification alone.

== See also ==
- List of best-selling albums
- List of best-selling albums by country
- List of best-selling albums in Belgium
- List of best-selling albums in France
- List of best-selling albums in Germany
- List of best-selling albums in Italy
- List of best-selling albums in Mexico
- List of best-selling albums in the Netherlands
- List of best-selling albums in the United States
- List of Billboard 200 number-one albums of 1978
- List of Billboard number-one R&B albums of 1978
- List of diamond-certified albums in Canada
- Sesame Street Fever
