= Nights on Broadway =

Song by the Bee Gees

Single by Bee Gees

from the album Main Course
- B-side: "Edge of the Universe"
- Released: September 1975
- Recorded: 20, 30 January 1975
- Studio: Criteria (Miami)
- Genre: Soft rock; funk
- Length: 2:52 (radio edit); 4:32 (album version)
- Label: RSO
- Songwriter: Barry, Robin & Maurice Gibb
- Producer: Arif Mardin

Bee Gees singles chronology
"Jive Talkin'" (1975)	"Nights on Broadway" (1975)	"Fanny (Be Tender with My Love)" (1976)

"Nights on Broadway" is a song by the Bee Gees from the Main Course album released in 1975. The second single released from the album, it immediately followed their number-one hit "Jive Talkin'". This track was credited to Barry, Robin and Maurice Gibb.

== Recording ==
Recording this track started on 20 January 1975 and continued on 30 January, when they started to record songs for the album: "Jive Talkin'" (finished 2 February), "Songbird", "Fanny (Be Tender with My Love)" (finished 19 February), "All This Making Love" and "Edge of the Universe".

Producer Arif Mardin asked if one of the Bee Gees members could do some screaming during the main chorus to make the song more exciting. In response, Barry Gibb began singing higher and higher, eventually singing it in a falsetto that was unexpectedly powerful. He had never known he had such an ability and Barry's falsetto became a trademark of the Bee Gees. Barry recalled in a May 2001 interview with Mojo magazine: "Arif said to me, 'Can you scream?' I said, 'under certain circumstances'. He said, 'Can you scream in tune?' I said, 'well, I'll try' ".

Barry Gibb talked about "Nights on Broadway" on The Larry King Show on 2 February 2002:

"It came to me in a dream, there was a request by Arif Mardin, who was like an uncle to us, he was a great record producer during the song 'Nights on Broadway,' for the Main Course album, which is previous to the 'Fever' syndrome. And he said, 'Can any of you scream, scream in falsetto.' So, you know, give us an ad lib or a scream at the end. So from screaming, it turned into things like 'blamin' it all'."

== Lyrics and music ==
The lyrics tell of a man who pursues a woman who doesn't love him while blaming his predicament on "the nights on Broadway/singing them love songs/singin' them straight to the heart songs." According to AllMusic critic Donald A. Guarisco, the melody is more streamlined than in previous Bee Gees' hits and the melody's "taut rhythmic swing mirrors the urgency of the lyrics." Guarisco described the song's rhythm as being "dance-friendly". The refrain marks the first time that Barry Gibb utilizes the falsetto voice that would become a Bee Gees' trademark.

== Reception ==
"Nights on Broadway" reached number seven on the American Billboard Hot 100 singles chart. The single was edited for radio airplay, removing the slow section; it fades at 2:52. The version of this song on Tales from the Brothers Gibb is faster than the album, and fades at 4:25. The 45 was also faster and runs 4:26.

Cash Box called it a "hard-hitting r&b effort," saying that "the Gibbs brothers wrap more incredible harmonies around the rock and roll mind." Rolling Stone critic Stephen Holden said that it "boast[s] spacious disco arrangements against which the Bee Gees overdub skillful imitations of black falsetto."

== Chart performance ==
=== Weekly charts ===
Chart (1975–1976)	Peak position
Australia (Kent Music Report)	67
Belgium (Ultratop 50 Flanders)	15
Canada Top Singles (RPM)	2
Netherlands (Dutch Top 40)	8
Netherlands (Single Top 100)	8
New Zealand (Recorded Music NZ)	14
US Billboard Hot 100	7
US Billboard Adult Contemporary	16
US Cash Box	4
US Record World	7
West Germany (GfK)	17

=== Year-end charts ===
Chart (1975)	Position
Canada Top Singles (RPM)	35
Netherlands (Single Top 100)	92
US Cash Box	58

== Cover versions ==
In 1977, Candi Staton released a version of the song for her Music Speaks Louder Than Words album. Her version peaked at no. 6 on the United Kingdom Singles Chart in the late summer of that year, and at no. 4 in Ireland.
