= Blue Weaver =

Welsh musician

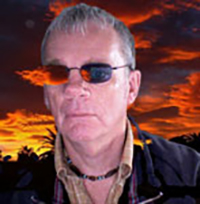
- Blue Weaver in 2008

Background information
- Birth name: Derek John Weaver
- Also known as: Blue Weaver
- Born: 11 March 1947 (age 78); Cardiff, Wales
- Genres: Progressive rock; disco; folk; rock; soul; pop
- Occupations: Musician; composer; songwriter; producer
- Instrument: Keyboards
- Years active: 1960s–present
- Labels: A&M; RSO Records; Immediate; Deram
- Formerly of: Amen Corner; Fair Weather; Strawbs; Streetwalkers; Bee Gees; Chicago; Mott the Hoople
- Website: blueweaver.com

Derek John "Blue" Weaver (born 11 March 1947) is a Welsh rock keyboardist, session musician, songwriter and record producer.

== Career ==
Weaver's career as a musician began as a co-founding member of 1960s Welsh rock band Amen Corner and its successor Fair Weather. In 1971, Weaver joined Strawbs after keyboardist Rick Wakeman departed to join Yes, contributing notable keyboard and Mellotron parts on Grave New World and Bursting at the Seams, the bands' most successful and critically-acclaimed albums. Weaver left Strawbs in 1973 and toured with Mott the Hoople on their US tour with supporting act Queen. The following year, he toured with Streetwalkers.

In 1975, former Amen Corner bandmate Dennis Bryon, who had begun playing drums in The Bee Gees backing band the year before, suggested Weaver as a replacement keyboardist for the band following the departure of Geoff Westley. The three-piece backing band of Weaver, Bryon and the perennial Bee Gees sideman, Alan Kendall, played on the Bee Gees' albums Main Course (1975), Children of the World (1976), Here at Last... Bee Gees... Live (1977), and Spirits Having Flown (1979), as well as the band's famous contributions on the Saturday Night Fever soundtrack, including songs like "Jive Talkin'" and "You Should Be Dancing".

As a songwriter and composer, Weaver was credited as a co-composer on Andy Gibb's hit song, "(Our Love) Don't Throw It All Away", as well as songs for Jimmy Ruffin's 1980 album Sunrise with Robin Gibb as lyricist, including the top 10 hit single, "Hold On To My Love”. Weaver composed the soundtrack for the film Times Square, again collaborating with Robin Gibb on Gibb's duet with Marcy Levy, "Help Me". In the 1980s, Weaver worked as a session player for the Pet Shop Boys.

As of 2009, Weaver was a director and supporter of the Music Producers Guild.
