= Jive Talkin' =

1975 single by the Bee Gees

Single by Bee Gees

from the album Main Course
- B-side: "Wind of Change"
- Released: May 1975
- Recorded: 30 January – 19 February 1975
- Studio: Criteria, Miami
- Genre: Funk; disco; R&B; blue-eyed soul
- Length: 3:44 (album version); 3:33 (single version)
- Label: RSO
- Songwriters: Barry Gibb; Robin Gibb; Maurice Gibb
- Producer: Arif Mardin

Bee Gees singles chronology
"Charade" (1974)	"Jive Talkin'" (1975)	"Nights on Broadway" (1975)

Music video
- "Jive Talkin'" on YouTube

"Jive Talkin'" is a song by the Bee Gees, released as a single in May 1975 by RSO Records. This was the lead single from the album Main Course (as well as a song on the 1977 Saturday Night Fever soundtrack). It hit number one on the Billboard Hot 100 and top-five on the UK Singles Chart in the middle of 1975. Largely recognised as the group's comeback song, it was their first US top-10 hit since "How Can You Mend a Broken Heart" (1971).

Barry Gibb re-recorded the song as a duet with the country music star Miranda Lambert for his 2021 album Greenfields.

== Origins and recording ==
The song was originally called "Drive Talking" in its early stage. The song's rhythm was modelled after the sound their car made crossing the Julia Tuttle Causeway each day from Biscayne Bay to Criteria Studios in Miami.

Recording for "Jive Talkin'" took place on 30 January and 2 February 1975. The scratchy guitar intro was done by Barry and the funky bass line by Maurice. The pulsing synthesiser bass line, which featured in the final recording, was (along with the pioneering work of Stevie Wonder) one of the earliest uses of "synth bass" on a pop recording. It was overdubbed by keyboardist Blue Weaver using a then state-of-the-art ARP 2600, which producer Arif Mardin had brought in for the recording of the Main Course album. Weaver stated, "Usually Maurice would play bass guitar, but he was away from the studio that night. And when Maurice came back, we let him hear it and suggested he re-record the bass line on his bass guitar". "I really liked the synth bass lines", Maurice said. "I overdubbed certain sections to add bass extra emphasis".

"Jive Talkin'" was also influenced by "You're the One" (written by Sly Stone) by Little Sister.

According to Maurice, while hearing this rhythmic sound, "Barry didn't notice that he's going 'Ji-Ji-Jive Talkin' ', thinking of the dance, 'You dance with your eyes'...that's all he had...exactly 35 mph...that's what we got." He goes on to say, "We played it to [producer] Arif [Mardin], and he went 'Do you know what "Jive Talkin'" means?' And we said 'Well yeah, it's, ya know, you're dancing.' [...] And he says 'No, it's a black expression for bullshitting.' And we went 'Oh, really?!? Jive talkin', you're telling me lies...' and changed it." Maurice goes on to describe how Arif gave them "the groove, the tempo, everything." Robin Gibb then goes on to mention that, because they were English, they were less self-conscious about going into the "no-go areas", referring to musical styles that were more black in styles, etc. He then said, "We didn't think that there was any 'no go' areas, it's music!" Barry's guitar strumming has a smoother version of Kool and the Gang's signature chicka-chicka and funky Nassau version of KC and the Sunshine Band's Caribbean strumming. The song's rhythm riff perhaps resembles the riff from "Shirley & Company's "Shame, Shame, Shame", with a prominent use of the Bo Diddley beat.

After hearing "Jive Talkin'", Lindsey Buckingham of Fleetwood Mac, and co-producer Richard Dashut built up the song "Second Hand News" (released on the band's Rumours in 1977) with four audio tracks of electric guitar and the use of chair percussion to evoke Celtic rock.

== Release ==
Upon its release to radio stations, the single was delivered in a plain white cover, with no immediate indication of what the song's name was or who sang it. The DJs would only find out what the song was and who played it when it was placed on the turntable; RSO did provide the song with a label on the record itself. It was the second time in the band's career that this strategy had been employed to get airplay for their music, after a similar tactic had popularised their debut US single "New York Mining Disaster 1941" in 1967.

Record World said that this "delightful departure from [the Bee Gees] time-tested sweet sound is no jive at all." Cash Box noted its "new funky sound" and said that "the Bee Gees have revitalized themselves and have come up with a single that will probably be their biggest hit since 'I've Got To Get A Message To You.'" Rolling Stone critic Stephen Holden said that it "approximates the synthesized propulsion of Stevie Wonder's 'Superstition,' while the song itself offers an inept lyric parody of black street argot."

The original studio version was included on the Saturday Night Fever soundtrack, as it was used in a scene that was cut from the final film. Later pressings of the album used the live version of "Jive Talkin'" from the Bee Gees 1977 album, Here at Last... Bee Gees... Live, due to contractual distribution changes. The CD version restores the use of the studio version.

== Personnel ==
Credits adapted from the album Main Course.

- Barry Gibb – vocals, rhythm guitar
- Robin Gibb – vocals
- Maurice Gibb – rhythm and electric guitars, bass, vocals
- Alan Kendall – electric guitars, steel guitar
- Blue Weaver – keyboards, synthesizer
- Dennis Bryon – drums, percussion

== Charts ==
=== Weekly charts ===
Weekly chart performance for "Jive Talkin'"
Chart (1975)	Peak position
Australia (Kent Music Report)	14
Belgium (Ultratop 50 Flanders)	24
Canada Adult Contemporary (RPM)	27
Canada Top Singles (RPM)	1
Ireland (IRMA)	5
Netherlands (Dutch Top 40)	23
Netherlands (Single Top 100)	26
New Zealand (Recorded Music NZ)	4
UK Singles (Official Charts)	5
US Billboard Hot 100	1
US Billboard Adult Contemporary	9
US Billboard Hot Disco Singles	9
US Cash Box Top 100	1
US Record World Singles	1
West Germany (GfK)	23

Chart (2020)	Peak position
US Hot Dance/Electronic Songs (Billboard)	25

=== Year-end charts ===
1975 year-end chart performance for "Jive Talkin'"
Chart (1975)	Position
Australia (Kent Music Report)	69
Canada Top Singles (RPM)	3
New Zealand (Recorded Music NZ)	20
US Billboard Hot 100	12
US Cash Box Top 100	43

=== Certifications and sales ===
Certifications and sales for "Jive Talkin'"
Region	Certification	Certified units/sales
Canada (Music Canada)	Gold	75,000^{^}
New Zealand (RMNZ)	Gold	15,000^{‡}
United Kingdom (BPI)	Silver	250,000^{^}
United States (RIAA)	Gold	1,000,000^{^}
^{^} Shipments figures based on certification alone.^{‡} Sales+streaming figures based on certification alone.

== Boogie Box High version ==
"Jive Talkin'"

Single by Boogie Box High

from the album Outrageous
- B-side: "Rhythm Talkin'" (part 1)
- Released: 22 June 1987
- Length: 3:40; 4:38 (album version)
- Label: SBK
- Songwriters: Barry Gibb; Robin Gibb; Maurice Gibb
- Producers: Chris Porter; George Michael

Boogie Box High singles chronology
"Jive Talkin'" (1987)	"Gave It All Away" (1987)

In 1987, "Jive Talkin'" was covered by Boogie Box High, a musical project that featured George Michael and Haircut One Hundred's Nick Heyward. Michael sang lead on "Jive Talkin'", although his vocals were uncredited.

=== Track listing ===
7″ single

1. "Jive Talkin'" – 3:40
2. "Rhythm Talkin'" (part 1) – 3:50

=== Weekly charts ===
Weekly chart performance for Boogie Box High's cover
Chart (1987)	Peak position
Australia (Kent Music Report)	82
Belgium (Ultratop 50 Flanders)	7
Netherlands (Dutch Top 40)	6
Netherlands (Single Top 100)	4
New Zealand (Recorded Music NZ)	38
UK Singles (Official Charts)	7

=== Year-end charts ===
1987 year-end chart performance for Boogie Box High's cover
Chart (1987)	Position
Belgium (Ultratop 50 Flanders)	72
Netherlands (Dutch Top 40)	71
Netherlands (Single Top 100)	74
UK Singles (OCC)	99

== See also ==
- List of Billboard Hot 100 number-one singles of 1975
- List of Cash Box Top 100 number-one singles of 1975
- List of number-one singles of 1975 (Canada)
