= Dennis Bryon =

Welsh rock drummer (1949–2024)

- Born: Dennis Ronald Bryon; 14 April 1949; Cardiff, Wales
- Died: 14 November 2024 (aged 75) Nashville, Tennessee, U.S.
- Genres: Rock, pop
- Years active: 1969–2024
- Formerly of: Amen Corner (1966–1969); Bee Gees (1974–1980)

Dennis Ronald Bryon (14 April 1949 – 14 November 2024) was a Welsh rock drummer from Cardiff, best known for his work with the Bee Gees from 1974 to 1980. Bryon and Ringo Starr are the only drummers to have five songs in the top ten Billboard chart simultaneously.

Bryon was the drummer for Amen Corner before he joined the Bee Gees. He also wrote, recorded or performed with many other artists, including Barbra Streisand, Kenny Rogers, Jimi Hendrix, Andy Gibb, Kayte Strong, Cathryn Craig, Brian Willoughby, Dave Edmunds, Jimmy Ruffin, Andy Fairweather Low, Ish Ledesma, and Steve Marriott.

== Career ==
=== Early career ===
Dennis Bryon was born in Cardiff, on 14 April 1949. He started playing the drums at 14 years old. His first band was the Blue Jets where fellow band member Rob Parsons subsequently had a very different career.

Bryon rapidly moved on to work with more accomplished musicians and his career really started out as a young adult, aged 17, in 1966, when he co-formed the band Amen Corner. They are best known for their hits "Bend Me, Shape Me", "High in the Sky" and the chart-topper "(If Paradise Is) Half as Nice". Bryon remained in the band until its split in 1969. Although the group had already split up, they also appeared as themselves in the 1969 horror film, Scream and Scream Again, singing the film's eponymous theme song.

=== Bee Gees ===
Bryon played drums with the Bee Gees' backing band from 1973 to 1980, including their contributions to the bestselling Saturday Night Fever soundtrack (1977) as well as performing on their studio albums; Mr. Natural (1974), Main Course (1975), Children of the World (1976), and Spirits Having Flown (1979).

Bryon played drums with the Bee Gees on all recordings, television, and tours from 1973 to 1980, including nine number one singles.

Bryon got the position as the Bee Gees' drummer after being invited to audition by their lead guitarist Alan Kendall:

In 1972 after Amen Corner broke up I was living in an apartment in London. In an apartment in the same building lived a guitar player named Alan Kendall. Alan played with the Bee Gees and one day came up to my apartment and told me the boys were looking for a drummer, and was I interested. I was, and Alan took me to Barry Gibb's house for my audition. That's when I met Barry, Robin and Maurice Gibb.

Bryon co-produced Robin Gibb's 1983 album, How Old Are You?

=== Recent works ===
When living in Nashville, Dennis played on albums created by local folk artists. Bryon released an autobiography about his years with the Bee Gees on 11 August 2015, called You Should Be Dancing: My Life with the Bee Gees. He was one half of the instrumental duo, Strong & Bryon, with his eventual wife Kayte Strong, who recorded three albums for Artfest records from 2003 to 2004.

A song Bryon wrote was used in the NBC series Swingtown in 2008. Dennis toured with 'The Italian Bee Gees' along with his keyboard colleague from the Bee Gees' band Blue Weaver and the group's guitarist from the 1960s Vince Melouney.

== Personal life and death ==
Bryon lived in Nashville, Tennessee in his later years. His wife, Jenny, died from breast cancer in 2010. He later married musical partner Kayte Strong, remaining with her until his death.

Bryon died in Nashville on 14 November 2024, at the age of 75. Amen Corner bandmates Blue Weaver and Andy Fairweather Low both announced his death on Facebook. Four days later on 18 November, former Bee Gees drummer Colin Petersen also died.

== Discography ==
- Round Amen Corner – Amen Corner – 1968
- The National Welsh Coast Live Explosion Company – Amen Corner – 1969
- Farewell to the Real Magnificent Seven – Amen Corner – 1969
- Beginning from an End – Fair Weather – 1970
- Mr. Natural – Bee Gees – 1974
- Main Course – Bee Gees – 1975
- Children of the World – Bee Gees – 1976
- Here at Last... Live – Bee Gees – 1977
- Saturday Night Fever – Bee Gees – 1977
- Spirits Having Flown – Bee Gees – 1979
- After Dark – Andy Gibb – 1980
- Guilty – Barbra Streisand – 1980
- Heartbreaker – Dionne Warwick – 1982
- How Old Are You? – Robin Gibb – 1983
- Now Voyager – Barry Gibb – 1984
- Doublewide & Dangerous – Antsy McClain – 1999
- I Will – Cathryn Craig – 2002

== Bibliography ==
- You Should Be Dancing: My Life with the Bee Gees, ECW Press (1 August 2015), ISBN 978-1770412422
