= Alan Kendall =

English–Welsh musician (born 1944)

- Born: 9 September 1944 (age 81); Darwen, Lancashire, England
- Genres: Rock; blues rock; blues; progressive rock; pop rock; hard rock
- Occupations: Musician; guitarist
- Instrument: Guitar
- Years active: 1964–present
- Labels: Polydor; Atco; RSO; Warner Bros.; A&M; Universal

Alan Kendall (born 9 September 1944) is an English musician and was the lead guitarist for the Bee Gees, in an unofficial capacity from 1971 until 1981, and again from 1987 until 2001.

== Career ==
His first recording was "Don't Play That Song (You Lied)", a single with a Lancashire band called Kris Ryan and the Questions, Kendall on lead guitar. His next known appearances were with Glass Menagerie. In 1970, he joined the bluesy progressive rock band Toe Fat who had released one album called Toe Fat. The original line-up of the band consisted of Cliff Bennett on lead vocal and piano, Ken Hensley on guitar, keyboards and vocals, John Glascock on bass and Lee Kerslake on drums; Kendall replaced Hensley on lead guitar. The band Toe Fat was managed by The Robert Stigwood Organisation, which suddenly dropped them in the middle of December 1970, right after they had returned from a US tour opening for Derek and the Dominos.

Kendall joined the Bee Gees in 1971, when the band was looking for a new guitarist to replace Vince Melouney and Maurice Gibb had doubled on lead guitar as well as bass and keyboards on 2 Years On. Though several albums were released by the Brothers Gibb after Kendall joined it, their major success came with the release of the Saturday Night Fever. In 1979, he played guitar on Jimmy Ruffin's album Sunrise. In 1986, Kendall co-wrote the songs "Moonlight Madness", "Change" and "System of Love", both songs were included on Barry's unreleased album Moonlight Madness, and he played guitar on that album.

With the Bee Gees, Kendall appeared on The Tonight Show, Late Night with David Letterman, Oprah Winfrey, a Command Performance for the Queen of the United Kingdom, as well as numerous other live performances.

== Equipment ==
Kendall uses a Fender Stratocaster and can be seen in several live performances with this type of guitar.
