= John Vallins =

- Born: John McIntyre Vallins; 19 January 1950 (age 76); Melbourne, Victoria, Australia
- Occupations: Songwriter, bassist, pianist
- Years active: 1966–present
- Website: Official website

John McIntyre Vallins (born 19 January 1950) is an Australian songwriter and musician best known for his 1970s song "Too Much, Too Little, Too Late".

One of only a handful of Australian songwriters ever to make No. 1 on the American Billboard charts, the song reached the top position in May 1978 sung as a duet by Johnny Mathis and Deniece Williams. It was a top ten hit in both Canada and the UK and certified gold by the RIAA and the BPI. It was also covered by English band Silver Sun in 1998 and reached number 20 on the UK Singles Chart.

== Early life ==
Vallins grew up in the Melbourne suburb of Kew, and in his early teens formed The Kinetics with school friends Steve Groves, Ian Manzie and Ken Leroy. The band had some success on the local charts and worked the many dances and clubs that sprang up in Melbourne in the mid-1960s, splitting in 1967. During the next few years, Vallins worked with many bands including a re-formed Kinetics with Ian Manzie, John Wickman and Mal Nichols, the Trap with Yvonne Barrett on vocals, an unnamed band with musicians Gil Mathews, Gary Mobely and Alan Turnbull and the Vibrants with Penny Parsons, Geoff Skewes, Mick Hamilton and Trevor Courtney. It was also around this time that he began working as a studio musician.

== 1970s ==
In 1971, Vallins travelled to London to join friends Steve Groves and Steve Kipner in the band Tin Tin which achieved a top 20 chart success in the US with "Toast and Marmalade for Tea" produced by Maurice Gibb. Managed by Robert Stigwood, Tin Tin joined the Bee Gees on an extended tour of the United States where their set consisted mostly of songs from their well received new album Astral Taxi. After Tin Tin split, Vallins spent much of the seventies working in London as a studio musician, and had hits in several European Countries as a solo artist. While working and writing with Steve's father Nat Kipner they produced tracks for various artists. It was around this time they wrote "Too Much, Too Little, Too Late". Returning to Australia in the late '70s, Vallins and fellow Aussies Gary Keady and John Phelps started the band World, along with London studio musicians Adrian Wyatt and Eric Cairns. Much of the band's repertoire was devoted to music written by John and Gary Keady for what was the genesis of a rock opera titled Star Lord.

== 1980s to present ==
Vallins moved into writing music for advertising in the 1980s, working firstly out of Albert Studios, where he worked with producers Bruce Brown and Russell Dunlop. Later at EMI Studios, he produced and wrote tracks for clients like American Express, Apple Inc., Dilmah Tea, De Beers, Domino's Pizza, 2Day FM, 2JJJ, 2SM, 2WS, Streets, Bulmers, McDonald's, Nestle, John Walker, Smith's Crisps, and more. As well as having written songs for Australian, European, Asian and South American headliners and American singers such as Barry White, in the '90s Vallins started his own music production company in Australia concentrating mainly on music for advertising, but also co-writing songs for various TV Series and Movies including the score of the Tristan Malls film Billy's Holiday, and Gary Keady's cult film Sons of Steel with songs also featured in the World Music Festival in Japan.

His songs have been covered and performed by a wide range of artists around the world including Johnny Mathis, Deniece Williams, Patti Austin, Tom Jones, Barry White, Mark Bautista, Sarah Geronimo, Silversun and Acker Bilk as well as many European, Asian and American Country Music Stars.

Vallins continues to work from the comfort of his studios in the Northern Rivers District of New South Wales, and has recently completed new compositions with senior Nashville writers as well as a new album with local country band Gunnado. He takes great interest in working with, and supporting young writers, partially in conjunction with his annual workshop at Camp Creative Bellingen which is patroned by David and Gillian Helfgott, and is a long term board member and presenter at local radio station 2BBB FM Radio.

== See also ==
- List of Billboard Hot 100 number-one singles of 1978
- Tin Tin (band)
- Too Much, Too Little, Too Late
