= Loner (disambiguation) =

A loner is a person who does not actively seek, avoids, or is isolated from human interaction.

Loner(s) or The Loner(s) may also refer to:

== Film and television ==
- The Loner (TV series), a 1965/66 American western TV series
- Loner (film), a 2008 South Korean horror film
- Loner (The Secret Circle), a 2011 episode of the television series The Secret Circle
- The Loners, 1967 working title of Easy Rider
- The Loners, a 1972 American film
- The Loner (film), a 1988 American TV film directed by Abel Ferrara
- Loners (2000 film), a Czech comedy film
- The Loners (2009 film), an Israeli film
- Loners (2019 film), an American film

== Books ==
- The Loner (children's novel), a 1963 adolescent novel by Ester Wier
- The Loner (Jardine novel), a 2011 crime thriller novel by Quintin Jardine
- Loner (novel), a 2016 novel by Teddy Wayne
- Loners (comics), a Marvel Comics series
- Loners: the Life Path of Unusual Children, a 1995 book by Sula Wolff

== Music ==
- The Loner (Maurice Gibb album), recorded in 1969 and 1970, but never released
- The Loner (Vic Simms album), 1973
- Loner (Missio album), 2017
- Loner (Alison Wonderland album), 2022
- Loner (Barry Can't Swim album), 2025
- Loner (EP), a 2014 EP by Stacy DuPree King, Darren King, and Jeremy Larson
- Loner, a 2018 album by Caroline Rose
- "The Loner" (Neil Young song), 1968
- "The Loner" (Maurice Gibb song), 1972
- "The Loner", a 1979 rock song on the album Over the Top by Cozy Powell
- "Loner" (Black Sabbath song), 2013
- "Loner", a song by Theory of a Deadman from the 2017 album Wake Up Call
- "Loner", a song by the Drums from the 2019 album Brutalism

== Organizations ==
- Loners Motorcycle Club, an outlaw motorcycle club in Canada
