= Tintin =

Tintin or Tin Tin may refer to:

== Arts and entertainment ==
- The Adventures of Tintin, comics series by Belgian cartoonist Hergé
  - Tintin (character), the protagonist and titular character of the series
  - The Adventures of Tintin (film), 2011, by Steven Spielberg and Peter Jackson
  - The Adventures of Tintin (TV series), 1991–1992
  - Hergé's Adventures of Tintin, 1957–1964
  - Tintin (magazine), 1946–1993
  - Tintin (musical), 2002
- Tin-Tin Kyrano, a Thunderbirds character

=== Music ===
- Tin Tin (band), a 1960s–1970s Australian pop group
  - Tin Tin (album)
- Tin Tin (British band), 1980s, featuring Stephen Duffy
- Tin Tin Out, a British music production team

== People ==
- Tintin Anderzon (born 1964), Swedish actress and the daughter of actress Kim Anderzon
- Tintín Márquez (born 1962), Spanish retired footballer and manager

== Other ==
- TinTin++, a MUD online game client
- Tintin A and B, SpaceX test satellites for Starlink

== See also ==
- The Adventures of Tintin (disambiguation)
