= The Loner (Maurice Gibb song) =

- UK 7" by Pye Records

Single by The Bloomfields

from the album Bloomfield
- B-side: "Homing In On The Next Trade Wind"
- Released: 7 January 1972 (UK); September 1972 (US)
- Recorded: 23 July 1970
- Genre: Folk rock, symphonic rock
- Length: 1:55
- Label: Pye (UK); Capitol (US)
- Songwriter(s): Maurice Gibb, Billy Lawrie
- Producer(s): Maurice Gibb

"The Loner" is a song written by Maurice Gibb and Billy Lawrie and originally included on Gibb's The Loner which was not released, although British rock band The Bloomfields covered the song and their version was released internationally, featuring a lead vocal of Billy Lawrie and Maurice Gibb, with Gibb on guitars and bass. They recorded this song for the film Bloomfield, but the film was called The Hero in America. The song starts with a drum fill. Gibb and Lawrie sang together in harmony on the line I'm a loner. On the record, Billy Lawrie was credited as 'B. Laurie'.

== Background ==
Gibb announced that he would be writing and performing on Richard Harris' film Bloomfield. The songs that Gibb originally planned for the film, "Danny" and "'Till I Try". But Gibb and Lawrie ended up re-recording "The Loner", a song from 1970 unreleased studio album of the same name by Gibb himself.

== Recording and release ==
The Bloomfields recorded a new short version of "The Loner", a song from Gibb's unreleased solo studio album of the same name. It was shortened by cutting out the short instrumental passages, but keeping the two verses and choruses intact. Their version was recorded from 23 July 1970 at the Nova Sound Studios in London. On the same day of sessions, they recorded "Men of Men" and "Ballet of Freedom" (both unreleased).

The song was released in the UK on 7 January 1972, and its B-side was "Homing in On the Next Trade Wind" performed by Heads, Hands & Feet released on Pye Records. In the US, Capitol Records issued a single by Heads, Hands & Feet with two songs they did on the soundtrack Hail the Conquering Hero; its B-side was also the flipside of "The Loner" in the UK. "The Loner" was also released on the film soundtrack of the same name.

The biggest differences between the two versions are poor sound quality on Gibb's original (as that version was unreleased until now, and only appearing on some bootlegs) and the use of faster tempo on Bloomfields' version.

== Personnel ==
- Maurice Gibb — lead vocals, acoustic and bass guitar
- Billy Lawrie — lead vocals
- Uncredited — drums, orchestral arrangement

== Maurice Gibb original version ==
"The Loner"

Song by Maurice Gibb

from the album The Loner
- Released: Unreleased
- Recorded: 9 December 1969
- Genre: Folk rock, country rock, symphonic rock
- Length: 3:07
- Songwriter(s): Maurice Gibb, Billy Lawrie
- Producer(s): Maurice Gibb

Its acetate version was issued in Japan on Ladybird Records but it was not officially released. He played guitar, piano and bass on this song, The other musicians were played on this song included: Leslie Harvey of Stone the Crows on guitar, Johnny Coleman on piano, Geoff Bridgford on drums and Gerry Shury arranged the orchestra. This version of "The Loner" was short, and Gibb and Lawrie sang lead.

"The Loner" was recorded on 9 December 1969 at Nova Sound Studios in London, the same session as "Railroad", "Take it Easy, Greasy", "I've Come Back", "Laughing Child", "She's the One You Love" and "Touch and Understand Love".

=== Personnel ===
- Maurice Gibb — vocals, guitar, piano, bass
- Leslie Harvey — guitar
- Johnny Coleman — piano
- Geoff Bridgford — drums
- Gerry Shury — orchestral arrangement
