= Fut =

Fut or FUT may refer to:

== Language and linguistics ==
- Finno-Ugric transcription
- Fut language, spoken in Cameroon
- Futuna-Aniwa language, spoken in Vanuatu
- Future tense

== Transportation ==
- Fatuha Junction railway station, in Bihar, India
- Fung Tei stop, in Hong Kong
- Pointe Vele Airport, in Wallis and Futuna

== Other uses ==
- The Fut, a British rock band
- Fut, a historical Russian unit of measurement approximately equal to 30.48 cm
- FIFA Ultimate Team, in the FIFA video game series
- Follicular unit transplantation
- Frente Unitario de los Trabajadores, an Ecuadorian trade union
- Fucosyltransferase
- Alternate Norwegian name for fogd, historical role of bailiff
- Friendly user test, referring to software user testing performed by people outside the development team, but known to the organisation conducting the testing.
- The area of the body between the anus and tailbone
