= Astral Taxi =

Studio album by Tin Tin
- Released: December 1971
- Genre: Rock
- Label: Polydor (U.K.); Atco (U.S.)
- Producer: Billy Lawrie; Maurice Gibb (executive producer)

Tin Tin chronology
Tin Tin (1970)	Astral Taxi (1971)

Professional ratings
Review scores
Source	Rating
Allmusic	3/5 stars

Astral Taxi is the second and final album released by the Australian rock band Tin Tin, released in December 1971. It was produced by Billy Lawrie, and Maurice Gibb was the executive producer.

== Track listing ==
All songs written by Steve Kipner and Steve Groves, except where noted.

Side one

1. "Astral Taxi" - 3:30
2. "Ships on the Starboard" (Steve Kipner, Steve Groves, Johnny Vallins) - 3:30
3. "Our Destiny" - 3:15
4. "Tomorrow Today" (Steve Kipner, Steve Groves, Billy Lawrie) - 3:50
5. "Jenny B." - 4:10

Side two

1. "I Took a Holiday" - 3:25
2. "Tag Around" - 2:25
3. "Set Sail for England" - 3:00
4. "The Cavalry's Coming" (Steve Kipner, Steve Groves, Johnny Vallins) - 2:45
5. "Benny the Wonder Dog" (Steve Kipner, Steve Groves, Johnny Vallins) - 4:00
6. "Is That the Way" (Steve Kipner, Steve Groves, Billy Lawrie) - 3:09
