= A Breed Apart =

A Breed Apart may refer to:

- A Breed Apart (1984 film), an American drama film directed by Philippe Mora
  - A Breed Apart (soundtrack)
- A Breed Apart (2025 Canadian film), a drama film directed by Adam Belanger and David Lafontaine
- A Breed Apart (2025 American film), an action horror film
