= Cartoone (album) =

Studio album by Cartoone
- Released: 1969
- Genre: Psychedelic pop
- Label: Atlantic
- Producer: Mark London

Professional ratings
Review scores
Source	Rating
Allmusic	3.5/5 stars

Cartoone was the debut album by the Scottish group Cartoone. The album is notable for featuring Jimmy Page of Led Zeppelin as guest artist.

The album has an inside cover which contains the full lyrics of the songs on the right and the following note from June Harris: "There's a new kind of musical excitement, and it's coming from this remarkable album by four boys from England (formerly Scotland) called Cartoone, more specifically Derek Creigan, Mike Allison, Charles Mo Trowers and Chick E. Coffils. You can't put a tag on the music within these twelve tracks, but they do provide an excellent illustration of the joint capabilities of Cartoone as a self contained unit who write and perform all their own material. Cartoone has created a sound of its own – Melodic, poetic and with great attention paid to detail. It's a fresh, different sound, as new as the group itself. Listen. Cartoone is saying something which clearly needs no further explanation."

Cartoone was released on CD in June 2009, with bonus tracks from the band's unreleased second album. The Cartoone Deluxe Edition CD was released by Friday Music in the UK on 26 October 2009.

== Track listing ==
All tracks written by Derek Creigan except when noted

1. "Knick Knack Man" – 3:50
2. "Withering Wood" – 2:24
3. "The Sadness Of Toby Jugg" – 2:39
4. "Penny For The Sun" – 3:06
5. "I'll Stay" (Mike Allison) – 2:07
6. "Girl Of Yesterday" – 3:10
7. "Can't Walk Back" – 2:52
8. "Let Me Reassure You" – 2:20
9. "Mr. Poor Man" – 3:43
10. "Ice Cream Dreams" – 2:47
11. "Doing What Mamma Said" – 2:39
12. "See Me" – 2:05
13. "Reflections" [single version; CD bonus track]
14. "Sunday Morning" [CD bonus track]
15. "Deep In My Heart" [CD bonus track]
16. "Going My Way" [CD bonus track]
17. "Give Me Something New" [CD bonus track]
18. "Reflections" [album version; CD bonus track]
19. "Don't Look Down Your Nose" [CD bonus track]
20. "Only I Can Do It" [CD bonus track]
21. "Come And Sit By Me" [CD bonus track]

== Personnel ==
- Derek Creigan – bass, lead vocals
- Mike Allison – lead guitar
- Mo Trowers – rhythm guitar
- Charlie (Chick E.) Coffils – drums
- Jimmy Page – guest artist
- Leslie Harvey – guitar on some of the bonus tracks
- John Cameron – orchestral arrangements
- Dave Siddle, E. Offord, Brain Humphries – engineers
