= The Loner (Maurice Gibb album) =

Studio album by Maurice Gibb
- Released: Unreleased
- Recorded: 9 December 1969 – 25 March 1970
- Studio: Nova Sound Studios (London)
- Genre: Folk rock
- Producer: Maurice Gibb

The Loner is an album recorded in late 1969 by Maurice Gibb of the Bee Gees. An album master was compiled on 14 November 1970, but to date The Loner remains unreleased. Bootleg releases with the same title collect additional recordings unrelated to this album.

== Background and recording ==
Billy Lawrie was involved in it, of course, and the various members of Tin Tin. It was just a good, fun time, really - working in the studio with Maurice always was. It's quite a nice piece of work for someone who ...no one really sees as a singer, really. He's more of a musician, really, than a singer, although he can sing harmonies".

– Tom Kennedy, on revealing the recording of the album

The final sessions for the Bee Gees' album Cucumber Castle took place on October 16, 1969. Two songs, "End of My Song" and "Julia", were recorded but neither was released. Around November 1969, Gibb collaborated with Australian group Tin Tin on recordings of the songs "Nobody Moves Me Like You", "Loves Her That Way", "Flag/Put Your Money On My Dog".

Although Gibb's plans as a solo artist were accelerating, he was also quoted as saying "I'd seriously love to get back to the old Bee Gees again. I really loved the group, and I miss the unit a lot. It's things like sitting in hotel rooms together after a show and taking people off that made working in a group such fun. I miss all that being solo."

By December, Gibb began recording songs for a solo album. He said in an interview that he played guitar, bass, piano, organ and Mellotron. Other musicians who played on the album include Leslie Harvey of Stone the Crows and Geoff Bridgford from The Groove who would later join the reformed Bee Gees for a short period. The first song recorded was "Railroad", which was later released as a single; however, it did not chart in the US or the UK. According to a tape note, the instrumental tracks are played by Harvey, with the members of the First Edition including Kenny Rogers.

== Album content ==
"Billy [Lawrie] and I have written a lot of album material", Gibb revealed. "I will probably be forming a group to work with me. There is something in the air. There will be a few lost friends, but I can't say too much about it." Billy Lawrie later recorded "Take It Easy, Greasy" but this was not released either.

"She's the One You Love" is the only true rock song on The Loner, an album consisting mostly ballads. "Laughing Child" perhaps similar to his later composition "Trafalgar" (1971), the title song "The Loner" was later covered by the Bloomfields for the film Bloomfield. "Touch and Understand Love" features Gibb's solo voice, with his acoustic guitar with no backup vocals or drumming.

Gibb himself was interviewed by Nicky Horne on Radio 1:

"My solo LP is one thing that, well, to tell you the truth, I don't think it should be worth releasing because I did it a while ago, and I was under a great depression at the time when I did it, because I missed the boys very much. I just did it because I thought I had to do it."

The single "Railroad" b/w "I've Come Back" was issued on 17 April 1970 in the UK, and also was issued in the summer of 1970 in several European countries, Japan, the US, Canada and Australia. These are the only tracks officially released from The Loner.

== Track listing ==
All tracks written and composed by Maurice Gibb and Billy Lawrie.

No.	Title	Length
1.	"Journey to the Misty Mountains"	3:08
2.	"The Loner"	3:07
3.	"Please Lock Me Away"	2:34
4.	"I've Come Back"	2:40
5.	"Soldier Johnny"	2:39
6.	"She's The One You Love"	3:27

No.	Title	Length
1.	"Railroad"	3:37
2.	"Laughing Child"	3:07
3.	"Something's Blowing"	2:28
4.	"Silly Little Girl"	2:07
5.	"Insight"	2:11

== Personnel ==
- Maurice Gibb – lead and backing vocals, guitar, piano, bass, organ, Mellotron
- Leslie Harvey – electric guitar
- Johnny Coleman – piano
- Geoff Bridgford – drums
- Gerry Shury – orchestral arrangement
