= Arrow Through the Heart =

"Arrow Through The Heart"

Song by Andy Gibb

from the album Mythology
- Released: 15 November 2010
- Recorded: July 1987
- Studio: Panther House, Miami Beach
- Length: 3:43
- Label: Warner, Reprise
- Songwriters: Barry Gibb, Maurice Gibb, Andy Gibb
- Producers: Barry Gibb, Maurice Gibb

"Arrow Through The Heart" was the final song recorded by singer-songwriter Andy Gibb before his death in 1988. The song was publicly released in its entirety for the first time on the Bee Gees' 2010 compilation box set Mythology.

== Content ==
The song was written by Barry, Maurice, and Andy Gibb as the last of four songs that would have led to a comeback album from Andy after his long battle with drugs. As preparation for the prehumous album (which would have been released by Island Records, but never issued), Andy and two of his Bee Gee brothers, Barry and Maurice, recorded demos of the four songs, one of which was "Man on Fire", the latter would ultimately be released on Andy's 1991 self-titled compilation album. "Arrow" would turn out to be the final song Andy would ever record, in late 1987. The lyrics, about a man's vain search for happiness, would prove to be prophetic for Andy (he died in 1988, several months after he recorded this song).

"Arrow Through the Heart" would be unreleased to the public for many years until VH1's Behind the Music series profiled Andy in an episode that would debut a segment of the song over the show's end credits. The entirety of this song had been bootlegged until the estates of the deceased Gibb brothers (Andy and Maurice), the then-surviving Bee Gees (Barry and Robin), and Warner Music Group eventually sanctioned an official release of the complete song for 2010's Mythology, an anthology set covering the careers of Andy and the Bee Gees.

== Personnel ==
- Andy Gibb — lead vocals
- Barry Gibb — backing vocals, acoustic guitar, programming
- Maurice Gibb — keyboards, synthesizer, acoustic guitar, programming, backing vocals
- Robin Gibb — backing vocals
- Scott Glasel — programming
