= Tin Tin (album) =

Studio album by Tin Tin
- Released: February 1970 (UK); October 1970 (US)
- Recorded: 6 May – November 1969
- Studio: IBC Studios, London
- Genre: Psychedelic rock, art rock, progressive rock, soft rock
- Label: Polydor (UK); Atco (US)
- Producer: Maurice Gibb

Tin Tin chronology
Tin Tin (1970)	Astral Taxi (1971)

Singles from Tin Tin
- 1. "Only Ladies Play Croquet" Released: May 1969; 2. "Toast and Marmalade for Tea" Released: 1970; 3. "Come On Over Again" Released: 1970

Professional ratings
Review scores
Source	Rating
AllMusic	4.5/5 stars

"Tin Tin" is the first studio album by the Australian group Tin Tin, produced by Maurice Gibb.

== Recording ==
Gibb not only produced Tin Tin but also played on several songs on this album. Steve Kipner recalls that they had fun trying to play everything themselves without a designated drummer. "Only Ladies Play Croquet" features Groves on guitar, both Groves and Kipner on drums and Gibb on harpsichord, bass, drums and mellotron. "He Wants to Be a Star" features Groves on guitar, with Gibb on bass and piano. On all tracks, Kipner and Groves handle lead vocals. Two unreleased tracks, "Bad Night" and "Listen", were written by Kipner and Groves and recorded on 6 May. On 6 October, they recorded the 1956 Chuck Berry song "Roll Over Beethoven", which was not released.

During sessions for the album, Gibb and Kipner recorded "Have You Heard The Word," which was released as a single under the name The Fut. For many years it was rumoured to be a lost Beatles recording, until Gibb and Kipner divulged the story.

== Reception ==
"Toast and Marmalade for Tea" reached No. 20 in the United States. "Swans on the Canal" was later released as a B-side of their 1971 single "Is That the Way". In the UK, the song "Loves Her That Way" was included, but in the US version it was replaced by the single "Come On Over Again".

== Track listing ==
- All tracks were written by Steve Kipner and Steve Groves, except where noted.

Side one

1. "She Said Ride" - 2:42
2. "Swans on the Canal" - 2:13
3. "Flag / Put Your Money on My Dog" - 4:24
4. "Nobody Moves Me Like You" - 1:55
5. "Tuesday's Dreamer" - 1:22
6. "Only Ladies Play Croquet" - 2:21

Side two

1. "Family Tree" - 2:31
2. "Spanish Shepherd" (Steve Groves) - 2:36
3. "He Wants to Be a Star" - 2:12
4. "Toast and Marmalade for Tea" (Steve Groves) - 2:22
5. "Loves Her That Way" - 2:17
6. "Manhattan Woman" - 3:08
7. "Lady in Blue" - 3:30

== Personnel ==
- Steve Groves — lead and background vocals, acoustic guitar, drums; sound effects (track 10)
- Steve Kipner — lead and backing vocals, piano, drums, harpsichord, bass, guitar, mellotron, percussion

Additional musicians

- Maurice Gibb — bass, piano, harpsichord, mellotron, drums
- Gerry Shury — orchestral arrangement (tracks 2,10,13)
