= The Fut =

1969 British musical group

- Origin: London, England
- Genres: Psychedelic rock, roots rock, soft rock
- Years active: 1969 (August)
- Label: Beacon
- Past members: Maurice Gibb; Steve Groves; Steve Kipner; Billy Lawrie

The Fut were a short-lived rock group formed in London in 1969, consisting of Maurice Gibb, Steve Groves, Steve Kipner and Billy Lawrie (the brother of singer Lulu and Gibb's brother-in-law and sometime songwriting partner). Their only single was "Have You Heard the Word", released in the UK on Beacon Records. This was the first time since the formation of the Bee Gees that Gibb, who was still in the group, had performed with another group. Groves and Kipner were members of the group Tin Tin.

"Have You Heard the Word" was written by Groves and Kipner, and recorded on 6 August 1969.

== Members ==
- Maurice Gibb – lead vocals, bass (from the Bee Gees)
- Steve Groves – lead vocals, guitar (from Tin Tin)
- Steve Kipner – lead vocals, piano (from Tin Tin)
- Billy Lawrie – background vocals
