= Everybody Clap (Lulu song) =

Single by Lulu
- B-side: "After the Feeling is Gone" (UK); "Goodbye My Love Goodbye" (US)
- Released: May 1971
- Recorded: 11 January 1971
- Genre: Pop
- Length: 2:23
- Label: Atlantic (UK); Atco (US)
- Songwriter(s): Maurice Gibb, Billy Lawrie
- Producer(s): Maurice Gibb

Lulu singles chronology
"After the Feeling is Gone" (1970)	"Everybody Clap" (1971)	"Ich Brauche Deine Liebe" (1971)

"Everybody Clap" is a song written by Maurice Gibb and Billy Lawrie, and was released by Lulu. The single's B-side was "After the Feeling is Gone" in the UK and "Goodbye My Love Goodbye" in the US. It was released on Atlantic Records in the UK and Atco Records in the US.

The song was written and produced by Maurice Gibb of the Bee Gees, Gibb also played guitar on this song and sang background vocals alongside Billy Lawrie. Leslie Harvey, who plays guitar on this track was also a member of Stone the Crows, Gibb's friend John Bonham of Led Zeppelin played drums on this song, Cream member Jack Bruce played bass on this song. This song was recorded on January 11 in Nova Sound Studios in London

The track failed to reach the official UK singles top 50, despite being given considerable TV air time, including a performance on Top of the Pops where Lulu was accompanied by Gibb, Bruce and Bonham and the dance troupe Pan's People.

== Personnel ==
- Lulu — lead vocals
- Billy Lawrie — background vocals
- Maurice Gibb — guitar, background vocals
- Leslie Harvey — guitar
- Jack Bruce — bass
- John Bonham — drums
- Gerry Shury — orchestral arrangement
