= John Bonham =

English drummer (1948–1980)

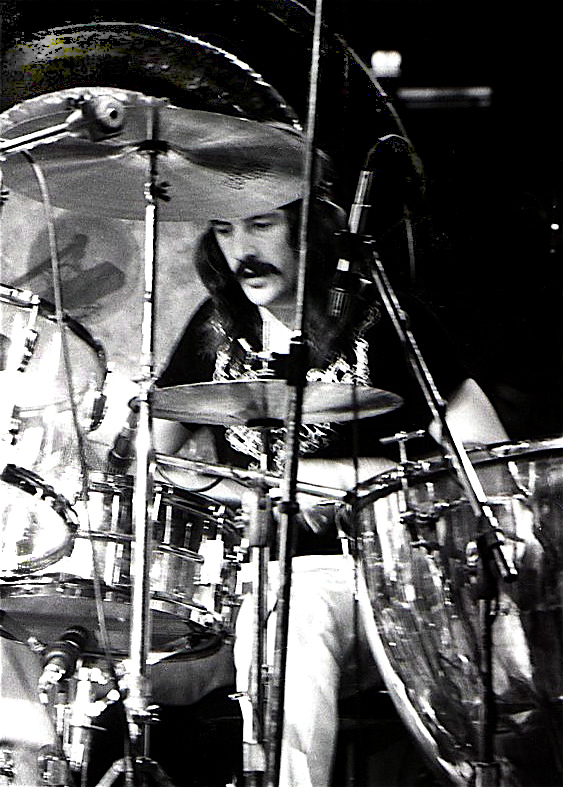
- Bonham performing with Led Zeppelin in 1973 at Madison Square Garden

Background information
- Also known as: Bonzo; The Beast; Powerhouse
- Born: John Henry Bonham; 31 May 1948; Redditch, Worcestershire, England
- Died: 25 September 1980 (aged 32) Clewer, Berkshire, England
- Genres: Hard rock; blues rock; folk rock; heavy metal
- Occupation: Musician
- Instruments: Drums; percussion
- Years active: 1964–1980
- Labels: Atlantic; Swan Song
- Formerly of: Band of Joy; Led Zeppelin
- Website: johnbonham.co.uk

John Henry Bonham (31 May 1948 – 25 September 1980) was an English musician who was the drummer of the rock band Led Zeppelin. Noted for his speed, power, fast single-footed kick drumming, distinctive sound, and feel for groove, he is regarded as one of the greatest and most influential drummers in history.

Bonham was born in 1948 in Redditch, Worcestershire, and took up drums at age 5, receiving a snare drum at age 10 and a full drum set at age 15. He played with multiple local bands both at school and following school, eventually playing in two different bands with Robert Plant. Following the demise of the Yardbirds in 1968, Bonham joined Plant, guitarist Jimmy Page and bass guitarist John Paul Jones to form Led Zeppelin.

Bonham showcased a hard-hitting hard rock style, but also handled funk and Latin-influenced grooves in later Led Zeppelin releases. Like Keith Moon of the Who, Bonham's drum set grew in size following the band's 1969 concert tours, including congas or timpani and a gong. His drum solo "Moby Dick" was featured on the group's second album and was a staple of their concerts, often lasting just over 20 minutes. Outside of Led Zeppelin, Bonham played drums for other artists, including the Family Dogg, Screaming Lord Sutch, Lulu, Jimmy Stevens and Wings. Bonham played with Led Zeppelin until his death at age 32, in September 1980 following a day of heavy drinking. The surviving members disbanded the group out of respect for Bonham.

A mostly self-taught drummer, Bonham was influenced by Max Roach, Gene Krupa and Buddy Rich. While he was primarily known for his hard-rock style during his lifetime, his reputation as a drummer has grown beyond that genre following his death. He has influenced various drummers, including Dave Grohl, Neil Peart, Chad Smith and Dave Lombardo. He was posthumously inducted into the Rock and Roll Hall of Fame in 1995 as a member of Led Zeppelin. In 2016, Rolling Stone named him the greatest drummer of all time.

== Early life ==
John Henry Bonham was born on 31 May 1948, in Redditch, Worcestershire, England, to Joan and Jack Bonham. He began learning to play drums at age five, making a kit of containers and coffee tins, imitating his idols Max Roach, Gene Krupa and Buddy Rich. His mother gave him a snare drum when he was 10. He received his first drum kit, a Premier Percussion set, from his father at age 15. Bonham never took formal drum lessons, although he received advice from other Redditch drummers. While at school, between 1962 and 1963, Bonham joined the Blue Star Trio and Gerry Levene & the Avengers.

Bonham attended Lodge Farm Secondary Modern School, where his headmaster wrote in his report that he would "either end up a dustman or a millionaire." After leaving school in 1964, he worked for his father as an apprentice carpenter between drumming for local bands. In 1964, Bonham joined his first semi-professional band, Terry Webb and the Spiders, and met his future wife, Pat Phillips, around the same time. He played in other Birmingham bands such as The Nicky James Movement and The Senators, with whom he made a single, "She's a Mod", in 1964, at Hollick and Taylor Studios in Birmingham. Bonham took up drumming full-time. Two years later, he joined A Way of Life. After the band's demise, Bonham joined a blues group called Crawling King Snakes, whose lead singer was Robert Plant.

In 1967, Bonham agreed to return to A Way of Life while keeping in touch with Plant. Plant formed Band of Joy and chose Bonham as the drummer. The band recorded demos but no album. In 1968, American singer Tim Rose toured Britain and asked Band of Joy to open his concerts. When Rose returned months later, Bonham joined Rose's band.

== Career ==
=== Led Zeppelin ===
After the breakup of the Yardbirds in July 1968, guitarist Jimmy Page formed another band and recruited Plant, who in turn suggested Bonham. Page's choices for drummer included Procol Harum's B. J. Wilson and Paul Francis. However, on seeing Bonham drum for Tim Rose at a club in Hampstead, north London, in July 1968, Page and manager Peter Grant were convinced he was perfect for the project, first known as the New Yardbirds and later as Led Zeppelin. Bonham was initially reluctant. Plant sent eight telegrams to Bonham's pub, the "Three Men in a Boat", in Walsall, which were followed by 40 telegrams from Grant. Bonham was also receiving more lucrative offers from Joe Cocker and Chris Farlowe but he accepted Grant's offer. He recalled, "I decided I liked their music better than Cocker's or Farlowe's."

Bonham's occult sigil of three intersecting circles, one of four for the band's members, appearing on the otherwise unmarked, unlabeled Led Zeppelin IV album

During Led Zeppelin's first tour of the United States in December 1968, Bonham became friends with Vanilla Fudge's drummer, Carmine Appice. Appice introduced him to Ludwig drums, which he then used for the rest of his career. His hard hitting was evident on many Led Zeppelin songs, including "Moby Dick" (Led Zeppelin II), "Immigrant Song" (Led Zeppelin III), "When the Levee Breaks" (Led Zeppelin IV), "The Ocean" (Houses of the Holy), "Kashmir" (Physical Graffiti), and "Achilles Last Stand" (Presence). Page let Bonham use a double bass drum in an early demo of "Communication Breakdown" but scratched the track because of Bonham's "over-use" of it. The studio recording of "Misty Mountain Hop" captures his dynamics, similarly exhibited on "No Quarter". On cuts from later albums, Bonham handled funk and Latin-influenced drumming. Songs like "Royal Orleans" and "Fool in the Rain" are examples, respectively displaying a New Orleans shuffle and a half-time shuffle.

His drum solo, first entitled "Pat's Delight", later "Moby Dick", often lasted twenty minutes. In some sections, he used his bare hands on his drums to imitate the sound of a phased hand drum. Bonham's sequence for the film The Song Remains the Same featured him in a drag race at Santa Pod Raceway to the sound of his solo, "Moby Dick". In Led Zeppelin tours after 1969, Bonham included congas, orchestral timpani and a symphonic gong.

=== Other projects ===
In 1969, Bonham appeared on The Family Dogg's A Way of Life, with Page and Led Zeppelin bassist John Paul Jones. Bonham also played for Screaming Lord Sutch on Lord Sutch and Heavy Friends in 1970. He played on Lulu's 1971 single "Everybody Clap", written by Maurice Gibb and Billy Lawrie. In 1972, he played on a Maurice Gibb-produced album by Jimmy Stevens called Don't Freak Me Out in the UK and Paid My Dues in the US, credited as "Gemini" (his star sign). He drummed for his Birmingham friend, Roy Wood, on "Keep Your Hands on the Wheel", a single subsequently released on his 1979 album, On the Road Again, and on Wings' album Back to the Egg on the tracks "Rockestra Theme" and "So Glad to See You Here". He was also featured on Paul McCartney & Wings' "Beware My Love" demo version first recorded in 1975; it remained unreleased until 2014 with the release of the album Wings at the Speed of Sound boxset. Bonham was the best man of Black Sabbath's Tony Iommi at his wedding ceremony.

In 1974, Bonham appeared in the film Son of Dracula, playing drums in Count Downe's (Harry Nilsson) band. Bonham appeared in a drum line-up including Keith Moon and Ringo Starr on the soundtrack album.

== Personal life ==
Bonham had a younger brother, Mick Bonham (1950–2000), a disc jockey, author and photographer, and a younger sister, Deborah Bonham (born 1962), a singer-songwriter. Bonham's mother, Joan, died aged 85–86 on 10 February 2011. She sang for the Zimmers, a 40-member band set up as a result of a BBC documentary on the treatment of the elderly.

Bonham married Pat Phillips in 1966, whom he had met at the age of sixteen in 1965, and the couple had two children. Zoë Bonham (born 10 June 1975) is a singer-songwriter who appears at Led Zeppelin conventions. Jason Bonham (born 15 July 1966) is a drummer who has recorded or toured with Sammy Hagar and the Circle, Black Country Communion, UFO, Foreigner, and Bonham. A 1973 film clip of seven-year-old Jason playing drums appears in the Led Zeppelin film The Song Remains the Same. Jason played with Led Zeppelin at their Atlantic Records 40th Anniversary reunion show on 15 May 1988 and again on 10 December 2007 at the Ahmet Ertegun Tribute Concert. He also played the drums for Heart's performance of "Stairway to Heaven" at Led Zeppelin's 2012 Kennedy Center Honors award ceremony. Zoë and Jason appeared at the induction ceremony for the Rock and Roll Hall of Fame in 1995 with the surviving members of Led Zeppelin.

== Death ==
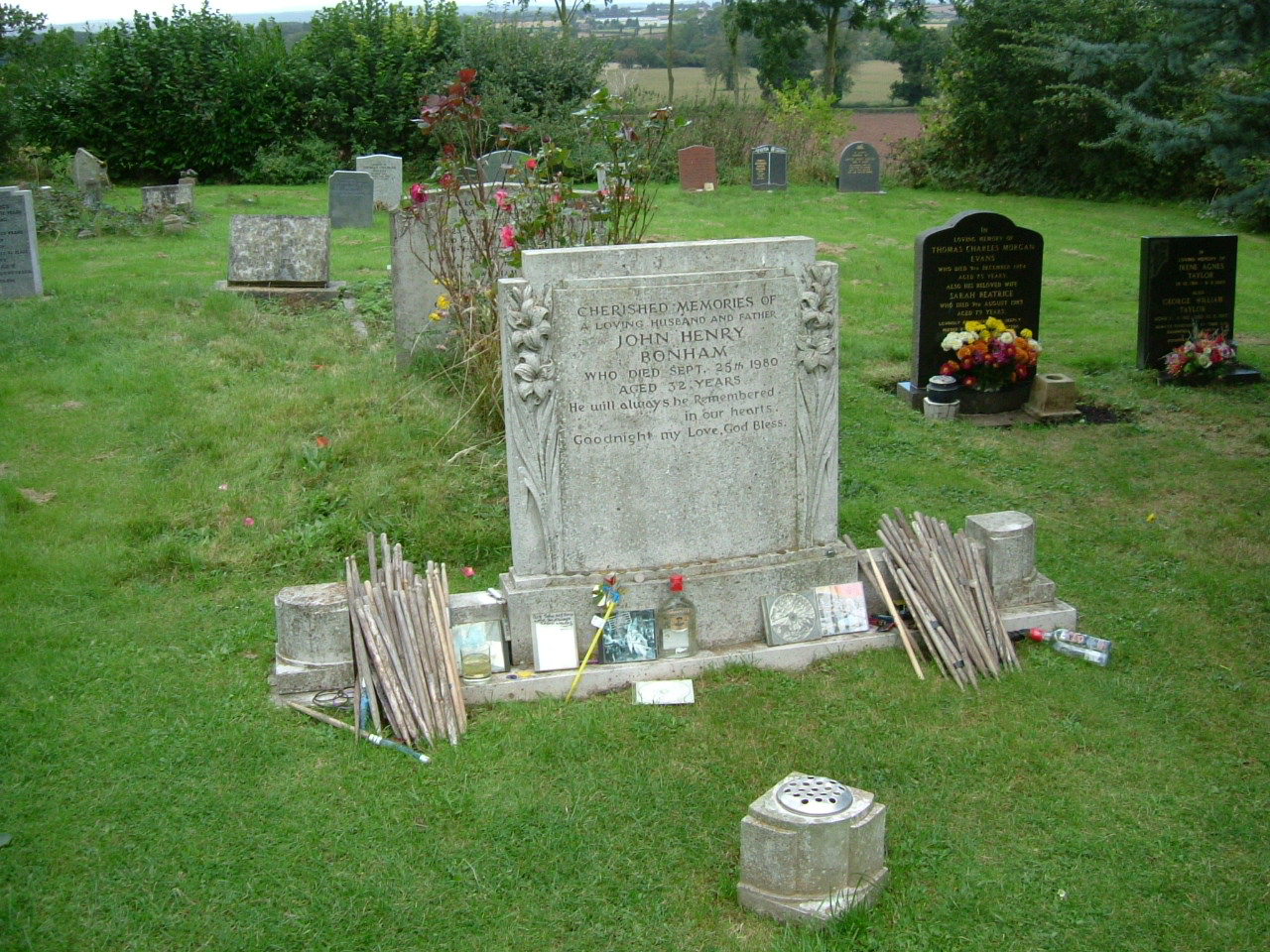
Bonham's grave at St Michael’s Church at Rushock in Worcestershire, along with drum sticks left in tribute by fans

On 24 September 1980, Bonham was picked up by Led Zeppelin assistant Rex King to attend rehearsals at Bray Studios for a tour of North America, to begin on 17 October in Montreal; it was the band's first American tour since 1977. During the journey, Bonham asked to stop for breakfast, where he drank four quadruple vodka screwdrivers (16 shots, totalling between 400 and 560 ml). He continued to drink heavily at rehearsals. The band stopped rehearsing late in the evening and then went to Page's house, the Old Mill House in Clewer, Windsor. After midnight, Bonham fell asleep; someone took him to bed and placed him on his side. Jones and the tour manager Benji LeFevre found Bonham unresponsive the following afternoon. He was pronounced dead at 32 years old.

The inquest on 27 October 1980 showed that in 24 hours, Bonham had consumed around 40 shots (1–1.4 litres) of 40% ABV vodka, after which he vomited and choked, a condition known as pulmonary aspiration. The finding was accidental death. A post-mortem found no other recreational drugs in Bonham's body. According to Rolling Stone, Bonham had recently overcome a heroin problem and was taking an unspecified medication for anxiety and depression at the time of his death.

Bonham's remains were cremated and his ashes interred on 12 October 1980 in the graveyard at St Michael’s Church, Rushock, Worcestershire. Rather than replace Bonham, Led Zeppelin chose to disband. They said in a press release on 4 December 1980: "We wish it to be known that the loss of our dear friend and the deep respect we have for his family, together with the sense of undivided harmony felt by ourselves and our manager, have led us to decide that we could not continue as we were."

== Artistry ==
=== Equipment ===
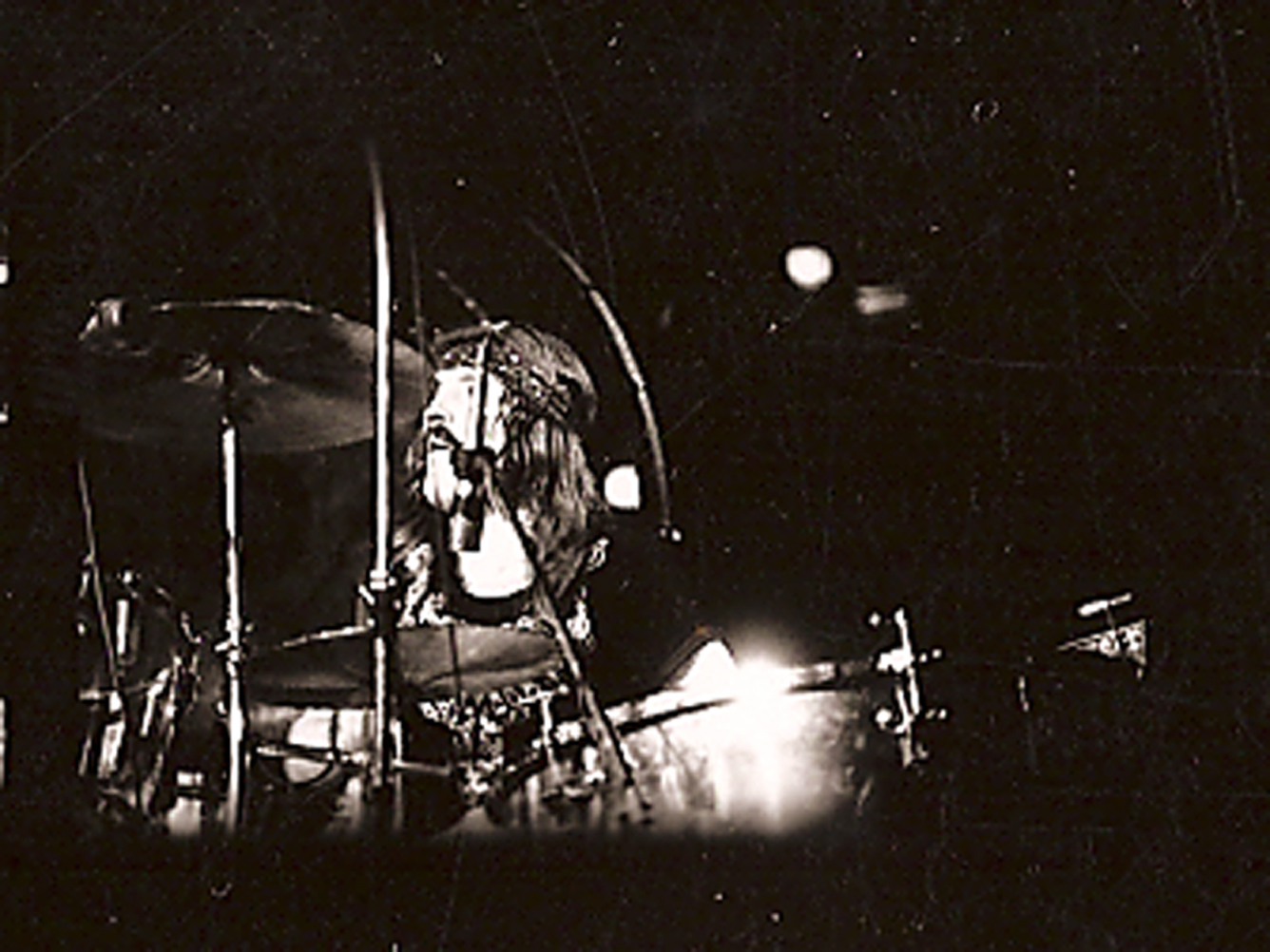
Bonham at Madison Square Garden with Led Zeppelin in 1973

Bonham initially used Premier drums, but in the late 1960s was introduced to Ludwig drums by Carmine Appice. Throughout the remainder of his career, Bonham endorsed Ludwig. At times, Bonham's kick drum pedal squeaked. Jimmy Page later commented:

The only real problem I can remember encountering was when we were putting the first boxed set together. There was an awfully squeaky bass drum pedal on "Since I've Been Loving You". It sounds louder and louder every time I hear it! [laughs]. That was something that was obviously sadly overlooked at the time.

In 2005, Ludwig reissued Bonham drum kits in several styles and, in 2007, stainless steel kits similar to those Bonham used on the last Led Zeppelin tours in the 1970s.

Bonham used Paiste cymbals and Remo drumheads. His hardware was a mixture of Rogers and Ludwig, including the Ludwig Speed King pedal and Rogers Swiv-O-Matic series of hardware. Initially augmenting his kit in live performances with timbales and congas as well as the cowbell, he soon settled on his trademark timpani, gong and ching-ring mounted on his hi-hat stand as the percussion in his setup in addition to the aforementioned cowbell.

Bonham drum solos would often feature playing floor toms and cymbals with his bare hands. He started using this technique as well as developing a finger-control style, influenced from hearing jazz recordings by drummer Joe Morello, during the early 1960s with his first band the Blue Star Trio.

== Legacy ==
=== Reception ===
For music critics who were not receptive to the hard rock aspects of Led Zeppelin's sound, Bonham's playing was sometimes characterized (along with the other elements of Led Zeppelin's music) as bombastic and lacking a sense of swing. While reviewing 1975's Physical Graffiti, Rolling Stone's Jim Miller wrote: "Bonham ... is a steak-and-potatoes percussionist, handpicked, one assumes, for his ability to supply a plodding, stolid, rock-solid bottom—no one has ever accused Led Zeppelin of swinging." In the 2012 documentary Beware of Mr. Baker, Eric Clapton reinforced the idea that Bonham's playing lacked subtlety, and that Bonham and his contemporary Keith Moon of the Who were not equals in terms of musicianship to Ginger Baker, Clapton's drummer in the 1960s rock band Cream. "No, no, no, no, [scoffs]. Ginger was nothing like those players. His musical capabilities are full spectrum. He can write and compose and arrange, and he has an ear, and he is harmonic. He is a fully formed musician."

Since his death, Bonham's reputation has continued to grow beyond the world of hard rock, and his playing is now commonly recognised by critics and musicians as worthy of close study. Modern Drummer said of Bonham in 2010: "Like nearly every British rock musician in the mid-'60s, the members of Led Zeppelin played in groups specializing in amped-up versions of black American music like the blues, R&B, jazz, and soul. To play that music convincingly, you had to swing, and few drummers in any genre have swung with as much swagger as John Bonham ... Despite all the deserved attention paid to his brilliant soloing ideas, his rhythmic sophistication, or his bass drum prowess, John Bonham was, above all else, a groover."

=== Influence ===
Rock drummers influenced by Bonham include Roger Taylor, Joey Kramer, Lee Kerslake, Neil Peart, Dave Grohl, Tommy Lee, Peter Criss, Chad Smith, Dave Lombardo, Brad Wilk, John Dolmayan, Ian Mosley, Yoshiki, and Shinya. Phil Collins, who became a drummer for Plant's solo career, told Plant he wanted to play with him because he "loved" Bonham's drumming.

Grohl said: "John Bonham played the drums like someone who didn't know what was going to happen next—like he was teetering on the edge of a cliff. No one has come close to that since, and I don't think anybody ever will. I think he will forever be the greatest drummer of all time." Smith remarked: "To me, hands down, John Bonham was the best rock drummer ever. The style and the sound was so identifiable to one person. Any drum set that he would play, it sounded like him." Other musicians also paid tribute. John Paul Jones said Bonham was a "bass player's dream". Page has commented: "One of the marvellous things about John Bonham which made things very easy [for a producer] was that he really knew how to tune his drums, and I tell you what, that was pretty rare in drummers in those days. He really knew how to make the instrument sing, and because of that, he could just get so much volume out of it by just playing with his wrists. It was just an astonishing technique that was sort of pretty holistic if you know what I mean."

Bonham's drumming has been widely sampled in hip-hop; for example, the Beastie Boys sampled "Moby Dick", "The Ocean", and "When the Levee Breaks" on their debut album Licensed to Ill. The drum beat of the popular song "Return to Innocence" by Enigma was sampled from the Led Zeppelin song "When the Levee Breaks".

=== Awards and tributes ===
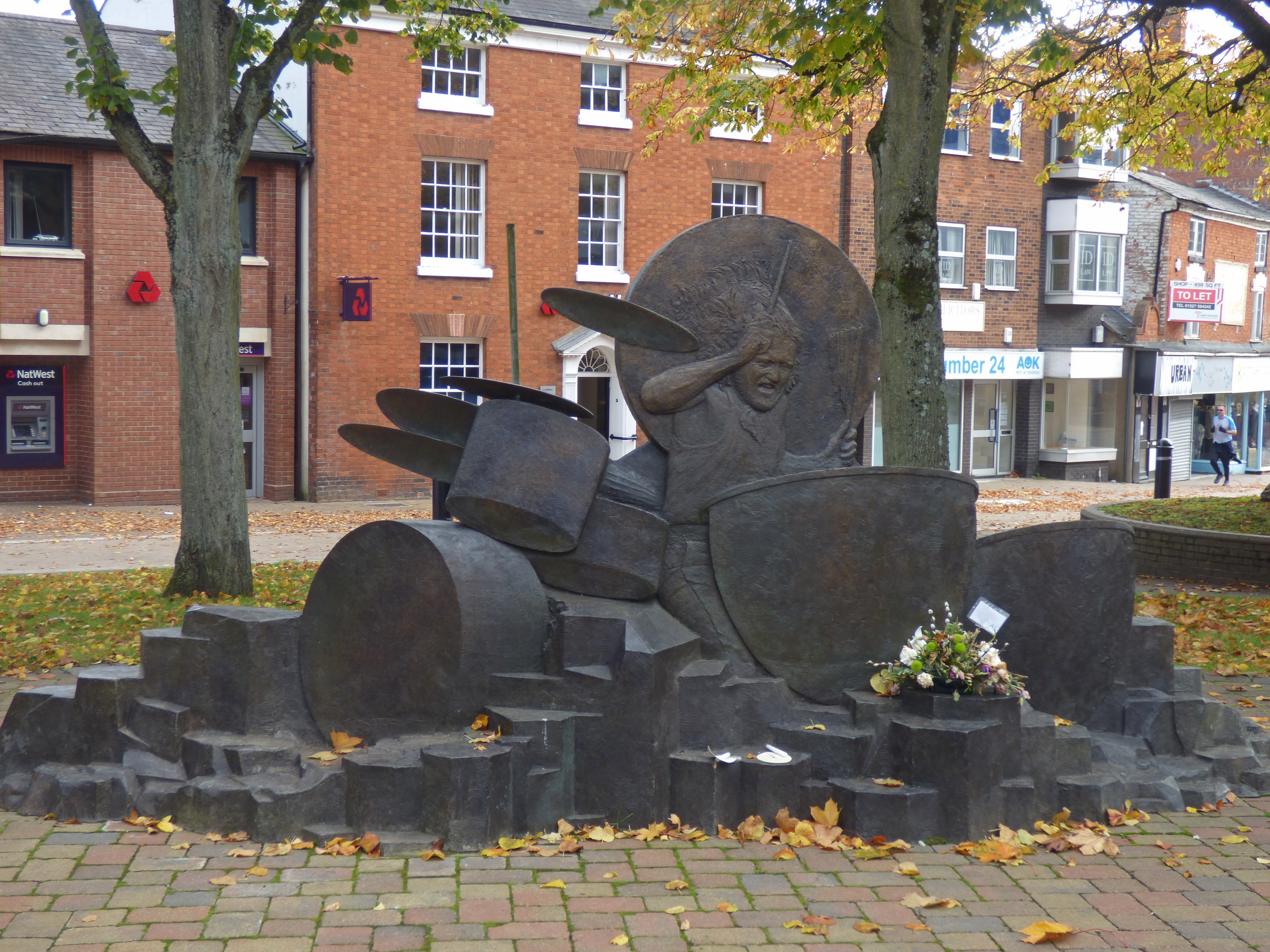
A statue of Bonham in Mercian Square, Redditch

Bonham has been described by AllMusic as one of the most important, well-known, and influential drummers in rock. Bonham was ranked No. 1 on Classic Rock's 2005 list of 50 Greatest Drummers in Rock, and Modern Drummer describes him as "the greatest rock 'n' roll drummer in history." Adam Budofsky, managing editor of Modern Drummer, writes: "If the king of rock 'n' roll was Elvis Presley, then the king of rock drumming was certainly John Bonham."

In 2007, Stylus magazine rated Bonham number one of 50 great rock drummers, as did Gigwise in 2008, and in September 2008, Bonham topped Blabbermouth.net's list of "Rockers fans want brought back to life", ahead of Elvis Presley and Freddie Mercury. Rhythm magazine voted him the greatest drummer ever, topping a readers' poll to determine the "50 greatest drummers of all time" in October 2009. At the end of the BBC Two series I'm in a Rock 'n' Roll Band! on 5 June 2010, Bonham was named best drummer of all time.

"Bonz: The Groove Remains the Same—A Night in Honor of John Henry Bonham" was produced by Whitesnake drummer Brian Tichy in Los Angeles on 25 September 2010 – the 30th anniversary of his death. Notable drummers that appeared at the tribute included Steven Adler, Vinny Appice, Kenny Aronoff, Frankie Banali, Fred Coury, Jimmy D'Anda, James Kottak, Chris Slade, Chad Smith, Joe Travers, Simon Wright, and John's son, Jason Bonham. Carmine Appice performed via video. In 1988, the Pulitzer laureate Christopher Rouse composed "Bonham" in tribute.

A Rolling Stone reader's poll where he "led the list by a significant margin" in 2011, and in 2016, the same magazine ranked him as the greatest drummer of all time in a list of 100 Greatest Drummers of all time. According to the Los Angeles Times, even after all these years, Bonham still ranks as the best drummer of all time, mentioning that "[his] beat still bangs like a mofo ... Nobody else has brought quite that balance of muscle, groove and showmanship."

The surviving members of Led Zeppelin reunited to play Live Aid in 1985 and employed two drummers, Phil Collins and Tony Thompson, to take his place. In June 2017, John Bonham's childhood home received a blue plaque in his honour.

On 31 May 2018, on what would have been Bonham's seventieth birthday, a statue was unveiled in his hometown of Redditch, England, to commemorate him. The work of sculptor Mark Richards, the bronze sculpture weighs around 2.5 tonnes and was installed in Mercian Square. It is covered in anti-graffiti paint and is emblazoned with the words: "The most outstanding and original drummer of his time, John Bonham's popularity and influence continue to resonate with the world of music and beyond." Following the installation of the bronze memorial on Church Green, a special music event was organised to celebrate Bonham's birthday.

In 2025, through the use of long lost archival interviews and family home movies, Bonham appeared in the musical documentary Becoming Led Zeppelin, directed by Bernard MacMahon and produced by Allison McGourty.

== Bibliography ==
- Bonham, Mick (2003). Bonham by Bonham: My Brother John. Solihull: Icarus Publications. ISBN 0-9545717-0-3.
- Bonham, Mick (2005). John Bonham: The Powerhouse Behind Led Zeppelin. Southbank Publishing. ISBN 1-904915-11-6.
- Lewis, Dave (1990). Led Zeppelin: A Celebration. Omnibus Press. ISBN 978-0-711-92416-1.
- Kushins, C. M. (2021). Beast: John Bonham and the Rise of Led Zeppelin. Hachette Books. ISBN 978-0306846687.
- Paul McCartney & Wings. Wings at the Speed of Sound (box set).
- Power, Michael (2016). No Quarter: The Three Lives of Jimmy Page. Omnibus Press. ISBN 978-1-4683-1214-0.
- Welch, Chris & Nicholls, Geoff (2001). John Bonham: A Thunder of Drums. San Francisco: Backbeat Books. ISBN 0-87930-658-0.
