= Have You Heard the Word =

Single by the Fut
- B-side: "Futting"
- Released: 7 March 1970
- Recorded: 6 August 1969
- Genre: Psychedelic pop
- Length: 4:39
- Label: Beacon
- Songwriters: Steve Kipner, Steve Groves
- Producer: Maurice Gibb

"Have You Heard the Word" is a song attributed to the Fut. Written by Steve Kipner and Steve Groves, it is the band's only single. Most of the vocals were sung by Maurice Gibb, in the style of John Lennon. The B-side "Futting" was an instrumental. It was released as a single on 7 March 1970 but did not chart.

== Recording and aftermath ==
"Have You Heard the Word" was recorded on 6 August 1969 at IBC Studios during a session for Groves and Kipner's group Tin Tin. That day, Maurice Gibb had broken his arm falling down a flight of stairs. He showed up to the recording wearing a cast and under the effect of painkillers. Kipner and Groves were not happy with the song to begin with, and as the session deteriorated, they left. Gibb recorded his vocals (an impression of John Lennon) and overdubbed bass in his distinctive style despite his injuries. Billy Lawrie, Gibb's brother-in-law and a well-known musician in his own right, recalls that he might have been there too, but admits his memory of the late 1960s is "none too good".

This song was released credited to The Fut. Years later, Gibb said that he had no idea how that happened. The record appeared in early 1970, and soon rumours began that it was one or more of the Beatles performing under a pseudonym.

On the original single, the credit for writing, arranging and producing "Have You Heard The Word" was given collectively to The Fut, with no further details offered as to any group member's identity. In May 1974 the song was credited as a Kipner/Groves composition, although BMI listed it as by Kipner, Groves and Lawrie. The recording was so plausible as a Lennon song that Yoko Ono and Lenono Music registered it in 1985 under Lennon's name, even though Lennon had earlier denied participation.

The b-side of the single, 'Futting', is a reggae instrumental which sounds nothing like the a-side and is possibly by another group altogether. Although the artist of the B-side is credited as The Fut, the writing, arrangement and production of the B-Side track is credited to "The Tuf".

== Personnel ==
- Maurice Gibb — lead vocals, bass
- Steve Groves — lead vocals, guitar
- Steve Kipner — lead vocals, piano
- Billy Lawrie — background vocals
- Uncredited — drums
