= The Adventures of Tintin (disambiguation) =

The Adventures of Tintin is a series of comic albums by Hergé.

The Adventures of Tintin may also refer to:

- The Adventures of Tintin (film), a 2011 film by Steven Spielberg
- The Adventures of Tintin (TV series), a 1991–1992 TV series
- The Adventures of Tintin: The Secret of the Unicorn (video game)
- Hergé's Adventures of Tintin, a 1959–1963 TV series
- The Adventures of Tintin: Breaking Free, anarchist parody of Tintin comics
- Tintin Reporter – Cigars of the Pharaoh, videogame

== See also ==
- Tintin (disambiguation)
