= Cartoone =

Scottish band

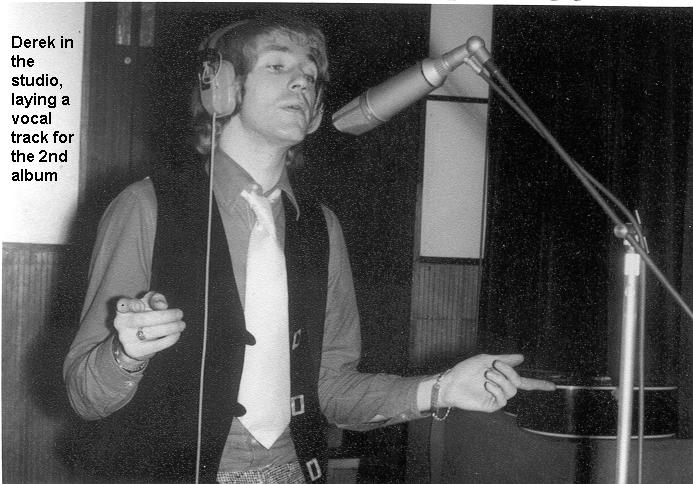
- Derek Creigan

Background information
- Origin: Glasgow, Scotland
- Genres: Pop / acoustic / rock
- Years active: 1967–1970
- Labels: Atlantic Records; Friday Music
- Past members: Derek Creigan (vocals, bass guitar); Mike Allison (guitar, vocals); Mo Trowers (rhythm guitar, vocals); Charlie Coffils (drums, vocals)
- Website: http://www.myspace.com/cartoone

Cartoone were a Scottish band formed in 1967. Their debut album featured Jimmy Page as guest musician.

== History ==
Cartoone were formed in 1967 from a band called The Chevlons. They toured all over Scotland in support of other acts such as the Tremeloes, the Merseybeats and the Hollies.

In 1968, the band moved to London in hope of landing a recording contract. Through Lulu they contacted songwriter Mark London (husband of Lulu's manager, Marion Massey) and showed him some of the songs they had written. London was impressed with the band and their songs, so he took them into a recording studio to record four songs using only acoustic guitars. London then took those songs to Ahmet Ertegün and Jerry Wexler of Atlantic Records, who subsequently signed Cartoone to a two-album deal. They were the first British rock band to sign with Atlantic, predating Led Zeppelin by several months.

The self-titled debut album, which features Jimmy Page on guitar for several tracks, was released by Atlantic in January 1969. Cartoone appeared on BBC TV on It's Happening for Lulu (12 December 1968) and Top of the Pops (16 January 1969) performing "Penny for the Sun".

In April 1969, Cartoone went to the United States to support Led Zeppelin on tour. After the tour Atlantic Records dropped the band and refused to release their second album, Reflections, which featured Leslie Harvey on guitar.

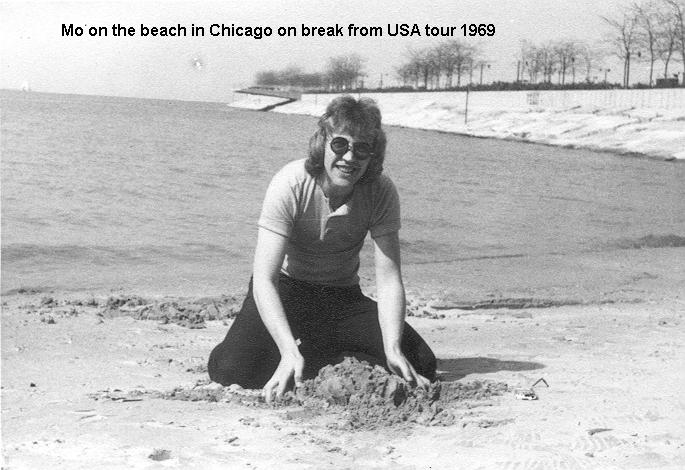
Mo Trowers

== Discography ==
=== Albums ===
Year	Album	Label
1969	Cartoone	Atlantic Records SD 8219
1969	Reflections	Atlantic (Unreleased)
2009	Cartoone Deluxe Edition CD	Friday Music FRM 1119

=== Singles ===
Year	Album	Label
1969	"Penny for the Sun"	Atlantic Records
1969	"Reflections on a Common Theme"	Atlantic Records
