= Don't Freak Me Out =

Studio album by Jimmy Stevens
- Released: 1972 (UK); January 1973 (US)
- Recorded: April–May 1972; Morgan Studios, London
- Genre: Folk rock, baroque pop, soft rock
- Label: Atlantic (UK); RSO (US)
- Producer: Maurice Gibb

Don't Freak Me Out is the first and only album released by English musician Jimmy Stevens in 1972. The album was produced by Maurice Gibb. But in the United States, it was released in January 1973 and was called Paid My Dues.

== Recording ==
Stevens recalls that his entire album was done in two sessions. For this first one he was to be accompanied by Alan Kendall and Maurice's friend John Bonham from Led Zeppelin. Bonham was busy elsewhere at the start of the session and a drummer Heydon Jones was hired quickly to fill in. The songs were recorded with Stevens singing and playing piano at the same time, Kendall playing acoustic guitar, and Jones or Bonham on drums. Stevens and the engineers were very happy with the results. In particular Bonham's powerful drumming touched off an impassioned performance by Stevens on the title track, which would be the English title song to the album.

Gibb was supervising the session, but he did not play together with them. Later he added bass to all but "Sweet Child of Mine" (which is just Stevens with orchestra), organ on "Don’t Freak Me Out", keyboard on "When You Grow Up", and Bill Shepherd orchestration to three songs. Kendall's acoustic guitar was just about mixed out, but he or Maurice added electric rhythm guitar to "High Heel Blues". All this tinkering changed the raw feel of the basic tracks.

The second session for the album was in May 1972, and features Peter Frampton on guitar, Mike Kellie on drums and the orchestra was arranged by Gerry Shury. Frampton played electric guitar instead on the "Bye Bye Love" and added electric guitar to two others. Frampton, who was a member of Humble Pie, recorded his first solo album Wind of Change around this time, and Kellie, late of Spooky Tooth, was the drummer on it, while Bee Gees’ tour drummer Chris Karan played percussion. Two of the album's songs, "Paid My Dues" and "Tears" were covered by then former Spooky Tooth lead singer Mike Harrison, on Smokestack Lightning, his second solo album, also released in 1972,

== Track listing ==
- All tracks were written by Jimmy Stevens except where noted.

Side one
No.	Title	Length
1.	"Paid My Dues"	4:46
2.	"Tears (Behind My Eyes)"	2:46
3.	"When You Grow Up"	3:36
4.	"Girl from Denver"	4:07
5.	"Bye Bye Love" (Boudleaux Bryant and Felice Bryant)	3:56

Side two
No.	Title	Length
6.	"You Are There"	4:38
7.	"Don't Freak Me Out"	4:00
8.	"Is It Me Babe"	3:28
9.	"Sweet Child of Mine"	3:02
10.	"You're the Lady I Want to Grow Old With"	4:00

== Personnel ==
- Jimmy Stevens – vocals, piano
- Maurice Gibb – bass guitar, organ
- Alan Kendall – guitar
- John Bonham – drums on "Don't Freak Me Out" and "Is It Me Babe"
- Heydon Jones – drums on "Tears" and "When You Grow Up"
- Bill Shepherd – orchestral arrangement
- Peter Frampton – guitar
- Mike Kellie – drums
- Chris Hughes – sax on "You Are There"
- Julian Gaillard – violin on "You're the Lady I Want to Grow Old With"
- Gerry Shury – orchestral arrangement
- Robin Black – sound engineer
- Paul Tregurtha – engineer
