= Toast and Marmalade for Tea =

Single by Tin Tin

from the album Tin Tin
- B-side: "Manhattan Woman"
- Released: 1970
- Genre: Baroque pop
- Length: 2:26
- Label: Polydor; Atco (US)
- Songwriter: Steve Groves
- Producer: Maurice Gibb

Tin Tin singles chronology
"Only Ladies Play Croquet" (1969)	"Toast and Marmalade for Tea" (1970)	"Is That the Way" (1970)

"Toast and Marmalade for Tea" is a song by the Australian rock group Tin Tin which was written by Steve Groves and produced by Maurice Gibb. It was a top 20 U.S. hit in 1971.

== Writing and recording ==
"Toast and Marmalade for Tea" was an unfinished song by Steve Groves, who had written only verses; Steve Kipner explained, "We had been thinking that we would write a chorus for it together". The resulting demo was recorded on 27 June 1969 and Maurice Gibb called them into the studio at short notice the following month and re-recorded it for the album. "We modulated the verses", Kipner continued, "since it was all that we had". Kipner and Groves had originally recorded the track on only guitar and piano. They would usually experiment with whatever was in the studio until Kipner concluded, "There was a drum kit, but the pedal was broken, so I pushed it by hand to make us a drum track, then Maurice put bass on it, playing with his broken arm".

The song's distinct "wobbled" piano melody was discovered accidentally when an engineer leaned on a tape machine creating the sound. "Manhattan Woman" was chosen as the B-side. Tin Tin obtained their recording deal with the help of Gibb, who also produced their self-titled debut album.

The single later received some radio airplay in the UK. In Australia, the song was a top 10 single.

== Personnel ==
- Steve Groves — lead vocals, guitar, sound effects
- Steve Kipner — lead vocals, piano, drums
- Maurice Gibb — bass
- Gerry Shury — orchestral arrangement

== Chart performance ==
Chart (1971)	Peak position
Australian (Go-Set)	10
Canada RPM Top Singles	11
New Zealand (Listener)	11
US Billboard Hot 100	20
