= Rushock =

Coordinates: 52.336502°N 2.173362°W

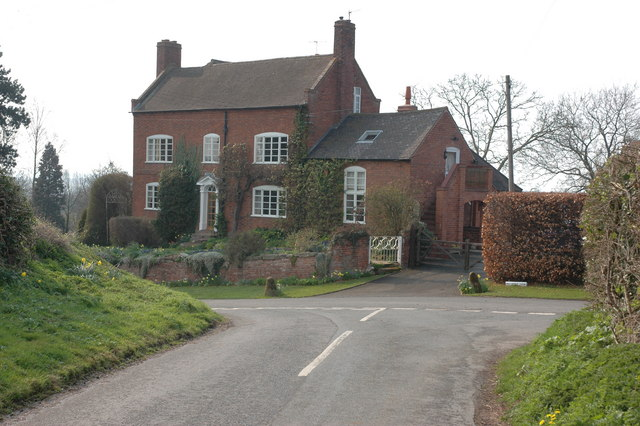
- Hill House Farm, Rushock

- Location within Worcestershire
- Population: 150 (2021)
- OS grid reference: SO882709
- Civil parish: Rushock
- District: Wyre Forest
- Shire county: Worcestershire
- Region: West Midlands
- Country: England
- Sovereign state: United Kingdom
- Post town: DROITWICH
- Postcode district: WR9
- Police: West Mercia
- Fire: Hereford and Worcester
- Ambulance: West Midlands

Rushock is a village and civil parish in the Wyre Forest District of Worcestershire, England. At the 2021 census it had a population of 150. The grave of John Bonham, the drummer of the English rock band Led Zeppelin, can be found in the graveyard of St Michael’s Church.

An episode of the BBC Radio 4 Countryside Magazine Open Country featured 400 years of Rushock agricultural history.
