= Railroad (song) =

Single by Maurice Gibb
- B-side: "I've Come Back"
- Released: April 1970
- Recorded: 9 December 1969; Nova Sound Studios, London
- Genre: Country pop
- Length: 3:37
- Label: Polydor; Atco (United States/Canada); Spin (Australia); Atlantic/Cotillion (Canada)
- Songwriter(s): Maurice Gibb, Billy Lawrie
- Producer(s): Maurice Gibb

Maurice Gibb singles chronology
"Railroad" (1970)	"Hold Her in Your Hand" (1984)

"Railroad" is the first solo single released by Maurice Gibb, best known as a member of the Bee Gees. It was released in April 1970. Like the Bee Gees' songs from 1967 to 1972, the single was released by Polydor in most parts of the world while in the US and Canada it was released by Atco. In Canada it was also released by Atlantic and Cotillion. Gibb did not release a follow-up single until 1984 when he released "Hold Her in Your Hand".

== Background ==
"Railroad" was written by Maurice Gibb and Billy Lawrie. Lawrie was the brother of Lulu, who Maurice married in 1969. The song was originally intended for a Bee Gees album. The single features guitar work by Leslie Harvey of Stone the Crows.

As Gibb explains: "People have said that my single sounds like the Bee Gees, I sang the higher parts usually, and the other vocal parts I've added to 'Railroad' could be the others." Gibb once said that his wife at that time, singer Lulu's reaction to the recording was that the piano was too loud; Gibb remixed it six times to please her.

== Reception ==
The single failed to chart in Australia or the US but reached #6 on the Malaysian Singles Charts and #9 in Singapore. Gibb's debut solo album The Loner was never released. In other territories this single and its B-side were released as a double A single. The CD version of this song appears in the box set Tales from the Brothers Gibb however its B-side, "I've Come Back", has never appeared on any other releases. Gibb handled all of the vocals on this track, covering the high harmonies and the lead in a manner that was impossible not to compare with the Bee Gees, he later described it as "anticlimactic" in the box set Tales from the Brothers Gibb.

This song was probably earmarked as the single from early on. It has the big singalong chorus of the Bee Gees hit "Don't Forget to Remember" and Robin Gibb's "Saved by the Bell" plus unique features like an intro, a verse played once, and a finish. Richie Unterberger at AllMusic describes the song as "another throwback to country-pop balladry".

== Personnel ==
- Maurice Gibb — lead vocal, guitar, piano, bass guitar
- Leslie Harvey — guitar
- Johnny Coleman — piano
- Geoff Bridgford — drums
- Gerry Shury — orchestral arrangement
