= The Rattlesnakes (1950s band) =

British band, active from 1955 to 1958

- The Rattlesnakes in Manchester, early 1958, from left to right: Paul Frost, Kenny Horrocks, Maurice, Barry and Robin Gibb.

Background information
- Also known as: Wee Johnny Hayes and the Blue Cats
- Origin: Manchester, Lancashire, England
- Genres: Skiffle, rock and roll, doo-wop, roots rock
- Years active: 1955–1958
- Past members: Barry Gibb; Robin Gibb; Maurice Gibb; Paul Frost; Kenny Horrocks

The Rattlesnakes were a British skiffle/rock and roll group, founded in Manchester in 1955 by Barry Gibb, which later changed to become the Bee Gees in 1958. They were one of the many skiffle bands that were formed in the United Kingdom in the 1950s since the revival of the American skiffle in the UK that was originally started in the 1920s, 1930s and 1940s.

Barry started a skiffle group, in which his younger brothers Robin and Maurice Gibb also joined as vocalists, after they returned to their parents' hometown in Manchester, England, in 1955. They were later joined by their friends and neighbours, Paul Frost (drums) and Kenny Horrocks (tea-chest bass). Their first public performance took place at Gaumont Cinema in December 1957, performing the Everly Brothers' "Wake Up Little Susie". Some of their influences at that time were Elvis Presley, the Everly Brothers, Tommy Steele, Buddy Holly and Paul Anka.

== Early years ==
In 1955, the Gibb brothers moved back to Manchester where they attended school, but, since Barry did not want to continue his studies, they decided to drop out and focus on music. The three brothers were influenced by rock and roll, as their older sister, Lesley, had some records by rock 'n' roll artists due to the genre's popularity in the 1950s. According to Horrocks, the name "The Rattlesnakes" was hand-painted by Barry on the side of the tea-chest bass.

During the same time, Barry set the scene for their first performance as he said: "What was happening at the Gaumont Theatre in Manchester - it was probably happening in other theatres too - where, between Laurel & Hardy and The Three Stooges and whatever, kids could get out of the audience and go on stage and mime to an Elvis Presley record, 'Blue Suede Shoes', or a Tommy Steele record and we liked this. We'd see this and look at each other and say, 'Oh we should try and do that, that's fun'. I was on my bike going down Buckingham Road in Chorlton-cum-Hardy. A boy called Paul Frost, another called Kenny Horrocks and another called Nicholas were running after me with the twins. We were joking about kids miming to records at the local theatre before the matinee started on Saturday morning. The kids used to mime to Elvis Presley records with plastic guitars. I suggested that we did this with an Everly Brothers disc. It was just nearing Christmas. We asked the cinema manager and he said okay. We decided to do it the week after Christmas".

== Rehearsals ==
Frost's mother, Sarah Salt, allowed the Rattlesnakes to practice in her cellar, where Frost kept a drum kit he had received for Christmas in 1956. He recounted the early practice sessions: "I must have been one of the few to recognize their talent when I think back." Frost's younger sister, Dorothy Wilson, occasionally minded her nephew, Paul, and heard some of their early rehearsals, although she maintains that she's a big fan of the group today.

The line-up consisted of Barry on guitar, Frost on drums, Horrocks on tea-chest bass, and Robin and Maurice on vocals and sometimes playing toy guitars. Their skiffle era tea-chest bass was also stored there. After months of faithful service, the tea-chest box was eventually left out at the side of Frost's house, where it lay for several months before it was finally thrown away in 1958. Frost remembers it, describing it as "a tea chest with a long broom handle fitted with strings." And he added "We used it as a bass, every group had a bass in those days."

After several weeks of practising, Barry proposed that they join the ranks of other kids who performed at the Gaumont, the venue where all local children spent their Saturday mornings. Nicholas Adams was also with them, when Barry made the suggestion about performing themselves, but Adams was not a member of The Rattlesnakes quintet.

== Performances in public ==
Barry said that the first song they performed was Paul Anka's "I Love You, Baby," which he remembered as a B-side of "Diana" but later in 1968, he remembered it as the Everly Brothers' "Wake Up Little Susie." Barry said: "When the great day came, all of us, including Kenny and Paul, went down to the theatre at 10 o'clock. I was clutching the record. We were going up the steps outside the cinema when I dropped the record and it smashed, We said 'What now?, no record, no miming?'".

Robin's recollections agree with Barry's up to his point and he added, "The Saturday came just before Christmas, and we were going up the stairs of the Gaumont when Barry dropped the record... Barry had a guitar, which he had taken along to help the miming, and he suggested that we go out and really sing. So we went out and sang 'Lollipop' by the Mudlarks, and it went down well. We ended up doing five more, including 'That'll Be the Day' [Buddy Holly], 'Book of Love' [the Monotones] and 'Oh Boy' [Buddy Holly], and that was how the Bee Gees began."

Barry talked about his style on playing guitar:

A serviceman who had been stationed in Hawaii lived across the road in Keppel Road in Manchester. I was a friend of his younger brother and he took me inside and started showing me chords that he'd learnt in Hawaii, playing Hawaiian guitar. So basically, I play the guitar completely wrong. I play totally unconventionally, much more in a country music sense. If you watch Dolly Parton play the guitar, it's the same as me. We bar all our chords - there's very little fingering going on, it's just all barring, which is basically steel guitar, open D or open E... A lot of country artists play the same way. So, I think when you're a kid and you live up in the mountains in America, there's no one to tell you how to tune a guitar so you do it by ear and you end up with that kind of tuning.

— Barry Gibb,

The first Saturday after Christmas, 28 December 1957, marked the group's first "real" performance. Like Barry, Frost is confused about the details of the broken record, but Horrocks is certain that the dropped record was indeed Lesley Gibb's Christmas present "Wake Up Little Susie" by the Everly Brothers, released in autumn that year. Horrocks recalls that, on Saturday mornings, the Gibbs always popped over the road to get him (Horrocks) first, before setting off to collect Frost at number 23. On the same occasion, they collected the tea-chest bass from Frost's basement before undertaking short trip to Gaumont Cinema.

The route was negotiated via a back alley to Selborne Road which joins another road called Barlow Moor and Manchester just opposite from where the Gaumont was situated. On the day of the first performance, Horrocks recalls Barry carrying his guitar, Frost and Horrocks carrying the tea-chest bass, and Robin and Maurice carrying the record and eventually dropping it. This is different from others’ recollections (both Barry and Robin’s), as Robin had never previously been linked with the incident in their recollections. Maurice may well be deserving of the credit for kick-starting their career, as he has often claimed. Their performance was in January and February 1958, and they performed was "Wake Up Little Susie." The routine was on Saturday morning kids' film starting at 10:00 AM, Approximately at 1:00 AM there was an interval, which the manager of the cinema encourage anyone to get up on the stage while the audience eating ice cream and other refreshments. Most of the performers/entertainers usually mimed to hits of the day in front of an announcer's microphone. Horrocks remembers a Brian Lewis who regularly had the first 10 min. spot and who sang Cliff Richard songs.

During the same year, Barry's guitar was accidentally broken by Frost, because the house was in darkness as Hugh was unable to pay the electricity bills at that time. Without lights to see, Frost sat down on a chair and broke Barry's guitar. Frost described it as "broken in the middle".

== Breakup ==
By early May 1958, the Gibb family moved to Northern Grove as Robin explained: "We did the Palatine [Cinema] as Wee Johnny Hayes and the Blue Cats, Barry as the Johnny Hayes." Around the same time, Frost and Horrocks left the band, as the brothers had moved, although the pair would maintain their friendships with their former neighbours. Horrocks recalls that Barry did a solo spot as Wee Johnny Hayes at a "Minor 15," a talent contest for under-fifteen held on Thursday nights at Princess Club in Chorlton. The brothers also sang their three-part harmonies at the Russell Street Club in Manchester.

At the beginning of August 1958, the family set sail for Australia. Before leaving, Barry told Horrocks, "I'm never going to work for anyone else, I want to be my own boss, I'll make it by myself, somewhere." Horrocks requested, "When you do, don't forget me," to which Barry replied, "I'll come back, I won't forget".

On 12 January 2003, Maurice died unexpectedly at the age of 53 of a cardiac arrest, while waiting to undergo surgery for a twisted intestine. On 20 May 2012, Robin died at the age of 62 from liver and kidney failure, following a battle with cancer. On 17 November 2012, Frost also died of cancer at the age of 64.

In June 2013, following Maurice's death in 2003, and Robin and Frost's deaths in 2012, Horrocks was scheduled to visit with Barry again in the studio, but on 27 June, Horrocks had to cancel the visit, and the two have not yet reunited.

== Members ==
- Barry Gibb – vocals, lead and rhythm guitar (1955–58)
- Robin Gibb – vocals, occasional toy guitar (1955–58; died 2012)
- Maurice Gibb – vocals, occasional toy guitar (1955–58; died 2003)
- Paul Frost – drums (1955–58; died 2012)
- Kenny Horrocks – tea-chest bass (1955–58)
