= Bloomfield (film) =

1971 film

- Film poster
- Directed by: Richard Harris; Uri Zohar
- Written by: Wolf Mankowitz additional material Richard Harris
- Story by: Joseph Gross
- Produced by: John Heyman; Wolf Mankowitz
- Starring: Richard Harris; Romy Schneider; Kim Burfield
- Cinematography: Otto Heller
- Edited by: Kevin Connor
- Music by: Johnny Harris; Maurice Gibb
- Production companies: Cenfilco Tel Aviv; Limbridge; World Films Company
- Distributed by: 20th Century Fox (UK); Embassy Pictures (US)
- Release dates: 9 November 1970 (world premiere): June 1971
- Running time: 97 minutes
- Countries: United Kingdom; Israel
- Languages: English; Hebrew
- Budget: £800,000

Bloomfield (released in the United States as The Hero) is a 1971 British-Israeli drama film directed by Richard Harris and Uri Zohar. It was entered into the 21st Berlin International Film Festival. The film stars Harris as an ageing footballer in Tel Aviv with his girlfriend (Romy Schneider) as he prepares for his final match.

== Plot ==
Eitan (Harris) is a forty-year-old footballer playing for Tel Aviv. His life is in disarray and his sporting career is fading as he age. He is unsure how to navigate his years-long relationship with Nira (Romy Schneider), whom he loves. As he prepared mentally for final football match, he fixates on the past and the anxiety of his future. He is offered a bribe to lose a match. But a chance meeting with a child Nimrod (Burfield), who is a fan of his, brings home the enormity of what he is about to do. Eitan decides to win the game.

== Cast ==
- Richard Harris as Eitan
- Romy Schneider as Nira
- Kim Burfield as Nimrod
- Maurice Kaufmann as Yasha
- Yossi Yadin as Weiner
- Shraga Friedman as Chairman
- Aviva Marks as Teddy
- Yossi Graber as Bank manager
- David Heyman as Eldad

== Production ==
=== Development ===
The film was originally called Knights of Bloomfield and was to be directed by Uri Zohar. At one point the film was going to be shot in Italy and was known as Viva Higgins. Another title when the film was to be shot in Italy was Arrividerci, Thompson.

Harris called the story "very autobiographical. It's a story about freedom and man's success and moments of failure." Harris made it after Cromwell.

The film was financed by the Investor's Overseas Service, a mutual fund run by Bernie Cornfeld. It was their first investment in moviemaking although Cornfeld had invested in the short lived Commonwealth United Company. There were ten individual investors along with the banks.

=== Filming ===
Filming started in October 1969 in Israel, in Tel Aviv and Jaffa. Two weeks into filming director Uri Zohar left the production. After a week Harris took over as director. Since Harris was not a member of a technical union a crew union ordered its members to stop working but they continued anyway. "No other director would take over without months of preparation," claimed Harris.

Harris was meant to be in Israel for five weeks and ended up staying five months, causing him to miss out on playing the title role in the film Scrooge (Albert Finney took the role).

After he made the film Harris said he felt like putting an ad in Variety apologizing to all the directors he had worked with. Cinematographer Otto Heller died two weeks after filming.

Location shooting took place around Tel Aviv, particularly at the Bloomfield Stadium. Interiors were shot at Twickenham Studios in London. The film's sets were designed by the art director Richard Macdonald.

Richard Burton wrote in his diaries he was told the film "was meant to be a sweet film about a small boy’s adoration for a great veteran footballer but" then Romy Schneider "raped Mr Harris and by means of the bedroom literally fucked the film up into a love story between herself and Mr Harris, the footballer."

Steven Berkoff was invited to work on a documentary about the making of the movie. He called the film "a ghastly shlock piece of sentimental junk conceived by quite a talented writer."

== Soundtrack ==
The soundtrack of the film composed and produced by Johnny Harris includes a short version of "The Loner", a song co-written by Maurice Gibb and Lulu's brother Billy Lawrie. Johnny Harris was MD for Lulu at the time this song was composed and recorded in 1969. It was released on a Pye Records single in 1972 performed by The Bloomfields when the film was finally released in Great Britain. The soundtrack also includes 3 tracks by Heads Hands & Feet.

== Reception ==
The film was to have had its world premiere on Friday, November 6th, 1970, at the Savoy cinema in Harris' hometown of Limerick. Some big names attended the premiere, including Roger Moore and Honor Blackman. But just as the show was about to start, a phone call was received saying that a bomb had been planted in the cinema and the building was hurriedly evacuated. No bomb was found but Richard Harris was understandably very angry about the incident. Screened at the 1971 Berlin Film Festival, Rex Reed who was a judge called it "an appalling piece of self indulgent garbage."

The film was not released in the US until 1972 where it was screened under the title The Hero.
