= The Bloomfields =

English rock band

- Origin: London, England
- Genres: Rock, glam rock
- Years active: 1970
- Labels: Pye, Capitol
- Past members: Maurice Gibb; Billy Lawrie; Johnny Harris

The Bloomfields were an English rock band formed in 1970 by Maurice Gibb, Billy Lawrie and Johnny Harris.

During the 1969–1970 split among the three Gibb brothers (Barry, Robin and Maurice), which temporarily broke up the Bee Gees, Maurice worked on a number of solo projects, Billy Lawrie is the brother of Scottish singer Lulu. The band recorded a new short version of "The Loner" and was released as a single originally recorded by Maurice on his first solo album The Loner, for use as the main title of a film called Bloomfield. The single's B-side was "Homing in on the Next Trade Wind"; the song was performed by the Heads, Hands and Feet (Johnny Harris was also member of that band). The Bloomfields recorded another two songs for the film included: "Men of Men" and "Ballet of Freedom" both songs recorded in Nova Sound Studios, London and was not released. They only released one single and they disbanded also in that year.
