= Jimmy Stevens (musician) =

- Also known as: Jimmy Sometime, Jimmy Summertime
- Born: 5 August 1942; Liverpool, England
- Died: 1 October 2021 (aged 79)
- Genres: Merseybeat
- Occupations: Singer-songwriter, musician
- Instruments: Vocals, piano, harpsichord
- Years active: 1966–2021
- Labels: Atlantic, RSO
- Formerly of: The Beathovens

Jimmy Stevens (5 August 1942 – 1 October 2021) was an English singer-songwriter and musician. He was the lead vocalist of the Beathovens. He worked with Maurice Gibb between 1971 and 1973.

== Biography ==
=== Early life ===
Stevens was born in Liverpool, England, to Tom and Mary Stevens. He had a brother called Tommy and a sister, Mary. The family lived in Garston and Speke. His father bought him an old pub piano, but like many of his generation he veered away from his classical training.

He studied at St. Francis Assisi School and later he went to John Almond Secondary Modern School and for two years Stevens was sent to board at Blackrock College, set in 56 acres overlooking Dublin Bay and run by the Holy Ghost Fathers. On a black wind-up gramophone in a dormitory there, he first heard Buddy Holly, who immediately became his hero. At the age of 15, he came back to Liverpool working for other people including a tailor who employed him to tighten the trousers of ordinary suits to meet the fashion for drainpipe trousers. An old wind-up gramophone for company and a collection of 78s, he developed a passion for Fats Domino and Ray Charles. In 1963 his composition Baby That's You was released by the Liverpool band The Young Ones on Decca Records. To supplement his meager income from music, he worked as a bookie's runner, a leather watch strap maker, and a coal miner. He even rejected an approach from Brian Epstein (manager of The Beatles)

=== Career ===
Stevens was the lead vocalist of the Beathovens, a Merseybeat group that appeared regularly at The Cavern Club in Liverpool. According to one source, the Daily Mirror once described Stevens as "a fat John Lennon [who] writes like a broken-down poet and sings like he chews gravel for breakfast."

In 1966, he released a solo single, I Love You, backed by Wharf 130, both songs written by Stevens. Around 1971, he was heard in Cam Studios in Moorfield by two Robert Stigwood representatives. A deal and the tour with ELP followed, which Stevens recalls with mixed emotions. 'You'd go on and find people were chanting 'ELP' when you were trying to sing.' In October 1971, he recorded his two compositions Tears (Behind My Eyes and The Band, produced by Maurice Gibb and Billy Lawrie.

In 1972, he released his album Don't Freak Me Out on Atlantic Records, produced by Maurice Gibb. In 1973 US version of the album, called Paid My Dues was released.

"Anyway," Stevens continues, "Maurice Gibb had this deal with Atlantic, so we made my album. On the tours, I was closest to Barry Gibb of the Bee Gees. But we didn't see so much of Robin. They were a very funny unit, actually. I don't think they socialised very much together as lads. They were all different. I remember us performing at the New York Philharmonic. I got a good review there. I was "delightful", said the Daily News".

Music broadcaster John Peel once described Stevens as "the excellent writer/singer Jimmy Stevens, whose Don't Freak Me Out LP on Atlantic you have almost certainly ignored—to your cost".

== Death ==
Jimmy Stevens died on 1 October 2021.

== Discography ==
=== Albums ===
Year	Album details
1972	Don't Freak Me Out: Released: 1972; Label: Atlantic Records

=== Charting singles ===
List of singles, with Australian chart positions
Year	Title	Peak chart positions
Year	Title	AUS
1973	"Tears (Behind My Eyes)"	84
