= A Breed Apart (soundtrack) =

Soundtrack album by Maurice Gibb
- Released: Unreleased
- Recorded: 1984
- Studios: Gold Star Studios, Los Angeles
- Genres: Country, instrumental
- Language: English
- Producer: Maurice Gibb

Maurice Gibb chronology
Strings and Things (1981)	A Breed Apart (1984)	The Loner: A Collection of Songs (2003)

A Breed Apart is the soundtrack album for the film A Breed Apart, composed and performed by Maurice Gibb. Majority of the record has been recorded in 1984, and the soundtrack was the last recording session at the Gold Star Studios in Los Angeles.

Jimmie Haskell said years later that he was very impressed by Maurice's demos, especially his sensitive playing of the flute parts. Jimmie mixed the synthesizer flute into the finished recordings because he liked the sound.

"Hold Her in Your Hand" was co-written with Maurice's brother Barry Gibb during the sessions for the Bee Gees' 1981 album, Living Eyes, but wasn't realized until later. Maurice ended up recording it for A Breed Apart soundtrack and released as a single in 1984. "Hold Her in Your Hand" was included on disc three of 2010 compilation album Mythology.

== Track listing ==
All the songs written and composed by Maurice Gibb except for “Hold Her in Your Hand”, which is by Maurice and Barry Gibb.

Side one
No.	Title	Length
1.	"Hold Her in Your Hand"	4:23
2.	"A Breed Apart"	2:10
3.	"Jim's Theme"	3:17
4.	"Solitude"	2:40
5.	"The Intruders"	3:46

Side two
No.	Title	Length
1.	"On Time"	3:35
2.	"Mike and the Mountain"	1:39
3.	"Adam's Dream"	4:03
4.	"A Touch Apart"	3:22
5.	"The Breed Ending"	2:30
6.	"Hold Her in Your Hand" (Instrumental)	4:23

== Personnel ==
- Jimmie Haskell — orchestral arrangement
- Maurice Gibb — synthesizer, lead vocal on "Hold Her in Your Hand" and "On Time"
- Dennis Hetzendorfer — engineer
