= Steve Kipner =

American-Australian singer-songwriter (born 1950)

- Born: Stephen Alan Kipner; 1950 (age 75–76); Cincinnati, Ohio, U.S.
- Origin: Brisbane, Queensland, Australia
- Genres: Pop; R&B
- Occupations: Singer; songwriter; record producer
- Instrument: Vocals
- Years active: 1960–present

Stephen Alan Kipner (born 1950) is an Australian songwriter and record producer. He has written a number of international hit songs such as Olivia Newton-John's "Physical", Natasha Bedingfield's "These Words", and Christina Aguilera's "Genie in a Bottle", for which he won an Ivor Novello Award for International Hit of the Year. Other hits he has writing credits on include Chicago's "Hard Habit to Break", 98 Degrees' "The Hardest Thing", Dream's "He Loves U Not", Kelly Rowland's "Stole", The Script's "Breakeven" and "The Man Who Can't Be Moved", American Idol Kris Allen's top 5 debut "Live Like We're Dying", Cheryl Cole's "Fight for This Love", Camila Cabello's "Crying in the Club" and James Arthur's "Say You Won't Let Go".

== Biography ==
=== Early life ===
Born in Cincinnati, Ohio, United States, Kipner began his music career in Brisbane, Queensland, Australia, where he grew up.

=== Steve & the Board ===
His first band, Steve & the Board achieved Australian chart success with the song "Giggle Eyed Goo", co-written by his father Nat Kipner and released on Spin Records in 1966. As a result of his father's A&R involvement in Spin Records, the members of Steve & the Board became good friends with the Bee Gees, who were also on the label. Nat Kipner, interviewed in 2001, said that Steve Kipner sang backing vocals on some songs on the Bee Gees album Spicks and Specks which was produced by Nat Kipner (Colin Petersen, the drummer of Steve & the Board, also played on some songs on that album).

=== Tin Tin and the Fut ===
Steve & the Board broke up in early 1967. Kipner then formed a duo with Steve Groves and relocated to England in 1968, where they recorded an unsuccessful LP as Steve & Stevie on Toast Records. After Kipner ran into Barry Gibb in 1969, Kipner and Groves were signed to Robert Stigwood with Maurice Gibb as their producer. Under the name Tin Tin, the group scored an international hit, "Toast and Marmalade for Tea", including an American top 20 placing in 1971. The next year Tin Tin, with additional member John Vallins, supported the Bee Gees on their American tour.

In August 1969, Kipner, Groves, Gibb, and Billy Lawrie recorded the song "Have You Heard the Word" in a Tin Tin session, with Kipner on piano and participating on the lead vocals with Groves and Gibb. Maurice Gibb's vocal impersonation of John Lennon led to the song appearing on Beatles bootleg albums as supposedly a lost Beatles recording.

=== Other bands ===
Kipner moved from London to California in 1974 and was a member of the bands "Friends" (MGM), "Skyband" (RCA), and "Think out Loud" (A&M). He then recorded the solo album Knock the Walls Down in 1979. While writing and recording for his own album, Kipner came into contact with other artists who developed an interest in his songs for their albums, and accidentally fell into a song-writing career as more and more opportunities arose.

At that time he met Australian manager Roger Davies, who in the late 1970s was working for Olivia Newton-John's manager Lee Kramer. Kipner had co-written a song with English songwriter Terry Shaddick titled "Let's Get Physical," and played the demo to Davies, imagining the song would be suited to a male singer such as Rod Stewart. Kramer overheard the song from the next room and thought it would be a way to promote another one of his clients, Mr. Universe, by having him appear with Newton-John on her album cover. Retitled "Physical", the song spent ten weeks at number 1 on the American Billboard Hot 100 chart and was a worldwide hit.

=== Songwriting career ===
"Fight for This Love" reached number 1 on the UK Singles Chart, and was the fastest-selling single of 2009 with 292,846 sales in its first week.

"Catch 22 (2 Steps Forward, 3 Steps Back)" is Track 4 on the Two of a Kind soundtrack and performed by Kipner. Two of a Kind was the second movie John Travolta and Olivia Newton-John co-starred in after Grease.

"Physical" was ranked by Billboard in 2017 as the No. 8 song among all those which charted during the 50+ year history of the Hot 100.

In 1999, Christina Aguilera released "Genie in a Bottle", written by Kipner, David Frank, and Pam Sheyne, which reached No. 1 on the Billboard Hot 100.

Over the years, Kipner has written songs for some of the music industry's biggest artists including Olly Murs, Doug Parkinson, Heart, Janet Jackson, Cher, Matsuda Seiko, Diana Ross, Neil Diamond, Laura Branigan, The Temptations, America, Cheap Trick, LFO, Westlife, Huey Lewis & the News, Joe Cocker, Al Jarreau, Rod Stewart, and American Idol's David Archuleta from Season 7. Other Billboard charting songs include "20/20" by George Benson, "Invisible Man" by 98 Degrees, "Potential New Boyfriend" by Dolly Parton, "Moonlight on Water" by Laura Branigan, "Heart Attack", "Twist of Fate" and "I Need Love" by Olivia Newton-John, and "Impulsive" by Wilson Phillips.

"Nothin' You Can Do About It" by The Manhattan Transfer (Extensions) written by David Foster, Jay Graydon, Steve Kipner (1979).

"Murphy's Law" by Al Jarreau (High Crime) written by Steve Kipner, Paul Bliss (1984).
