= Leslie Harvey =

Scottish guitarist (1944–1972)

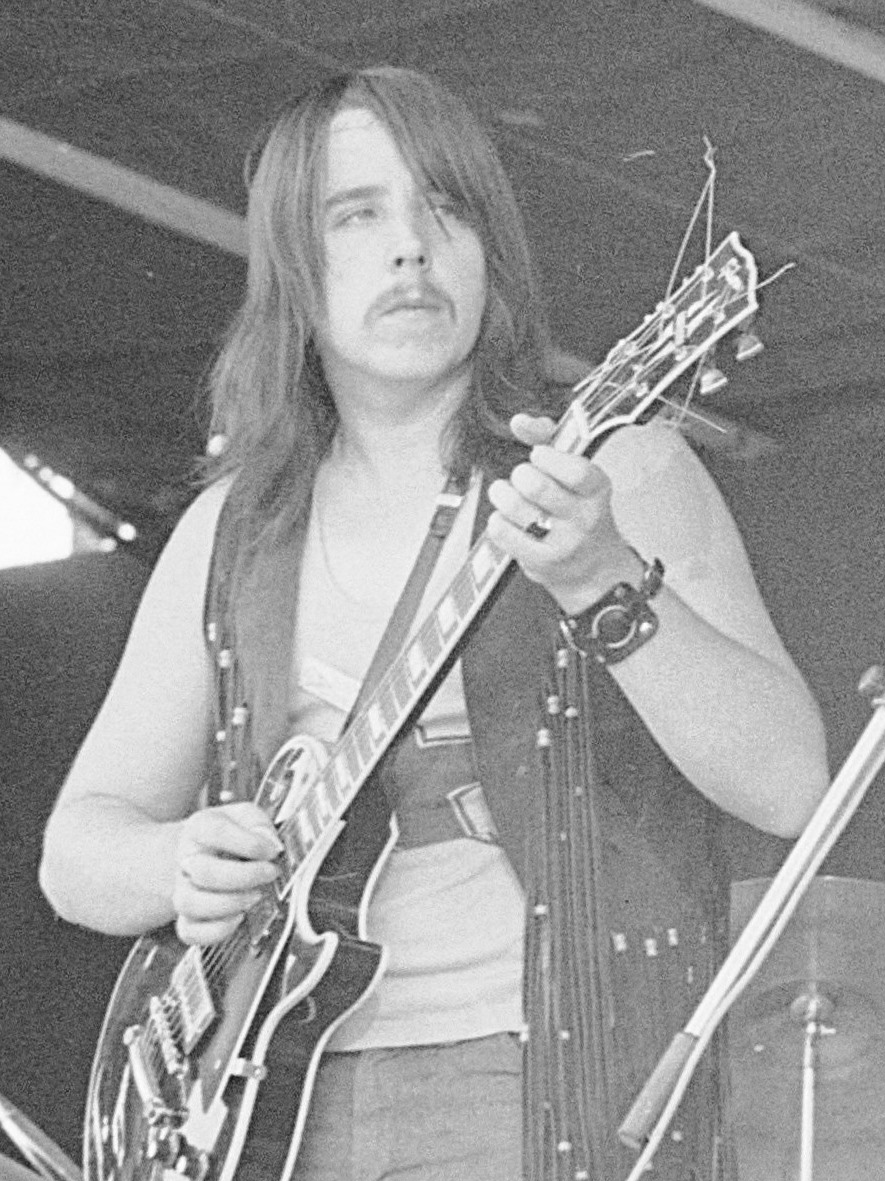
- Harvey in 1970

Background information
- Also known as: Les Harvey
- Born: Leslie Cameron Harvey; 13 September 1944; Govan, Glasgow, Scotland
- Died: 3 May 1972 (aged 27) Swansea, Wales
- Genres: Rock, soul, blues rock
- Occupation: Guitarist
- Instrument: Guitar
- Years active: 1960s–1972

Leslie Cameron Harvey (13 September 1944 – 3 May 1972) was a Scottish guitarist in several bands of the late 1960s and early 1970s, most notably Stone the Crows.

== Early life ==
Harvey grew up in Kinning Park in the south of Glasgow; his elder brother Alex was also a musician.

== Career ==
In the 1960s, Harvey was asked to join the Animals by Alan Price but chose to stay with his brother in the Alex Harvey Soul Band. He later joined the Blues Council, another Scottish band. The Blues Council made one record, Baby Don't Look Down. In March 1965, their tour van crashed, killing vocalist Fraser Calder and bassist James Giffen, and the rest of the band went their separate ways.

In 1969, Harvey joined the Scottish band Cartoone to record some tracks for their second album. He also accompanied Cartoone on their live tour of the United States supporting Led Zeppelin. They also supported the US band Spirit in 1969. John Lee Hooker, whose songs both Harvey and Cartoone used to cover on their tour of the UK, was their opening act.

In December 1969 Harvey played guitar on Bee Gees member Maurice Gibb's The Loner album, but only the single "Railroad" was released. The album remains unreleased as of 2024.

Harvey was a co-founder of Stone the Crows in late 1969. The blues rock and progressive soul band was formed by Harvey, Maggie Bell, Colin Allen, James Dewar, and John McGinnis. Harvey first met lead singer Maggie Bell through his older brother, Alex Harvey. After playing together in the Kinning Park Ramblers, their next band Power was renamed Stone the Crows (after a British exclamation of surprise or shock) by Led Zeppelin's manager, Peter Grant. The manager for Stone the Crows was Mark London, who also managed Cartoone while Harvey was in it.

Harvey's final recordings came out on Stone the Crows' fourth album, Ontinuous Performance. The album released four months after his death in 1972. The final song on the album, "Sunset Cowboy," was a tribute to Harvey.

== Personal life ==
Harvey was born in Govan, Glasgow. His older brother was Alex Harvey, a rock musician who made a name for himself as a glam rock artist in the 1970s.

== Death ==
While on stage with Stone the Crows at a Top Rank Suite in Swansea on 3 May 1972, he was electrocuted in front of a live audience when he touched a microphone that was not earthed while the fingers of his other hand were holding the strings of his guitar. A roadie attempted to unplug the guitar, but was unsuccessful. An ambulance was called but Harvey was pronounced dead on arrival from his injuries, aged 27.

It has been incorrectly stated that the incident happened "on a rainy day with puddles on the stage"; however, Swansea Top Rank was an indoor venue and therefore this was not possible.

== See also ==
- List of entertainers who died during a performance
