= Tin Tin (band) =

Australian band

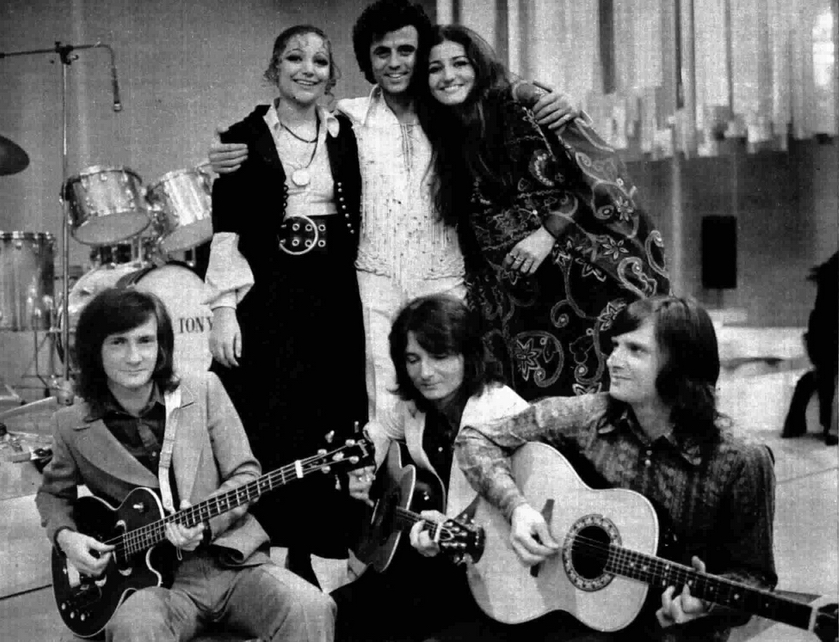
- Mia Martini, Little Tony, Vena Veroutis and Tin-Tin

Background information
- Also known as: The Kinetics, Steve and Stevie, Rombo's World
- Origin: Melbourne, Victoria, Australia
- Genres: Pop rock, blues rock, psychedelic rock, psychedelic pop, art rock
- Years active: 1966–1973
- Labels: Polydor, Atco
- Past members: Steve Kipner; Steve Groves; John Vallins; Geoff Bridgford

Tin Tin was a pop rock band which first formed in Australia as the Kinetics in 1966. They relocated to the United Kingdom in 1969 and were renamed as Tin Tin, which comprised Steve Kipner (vocals, keyboards, percussion), Steve Groves (vocals, guitar, percussion), John Vallins (bass, guitar, vocals) and Geoff Bridgford (drums). In 1970 they issued a single, "Toast and Marmalade for Tea", which was a No. 10 hit on the Go-Set National Singles Chart in June the following year. It also reached No. 20 in the United States on the Billboard Hot 100. Their next single, "Is That the Way?" (1971), peaked at No. 59 on the Billboard Hot 100.

The group disbanded in 1973 and Kipner continued as a songwriter for various acts including Chicago, George Benson and Olivia Newton-John. Groves returned to Australia and worked as a singer-songwriter. Vallins teamed up with Kipner's father, Nat, to co-write "Too Much, Too Little, Too Late" for Johnny Mathis and Deniece Williams, which was a number-one hit on the Billboard Hot 100 in March 1978.

== History ==
=== Formation and early years ===
Tin Tin was formed in 1966 in Melbourne as a beat pop group, the Kinetics, with a line-up of Steve Groves on vocals, guitar and harmonica, Ken Leroy on bass guitar, Ian Manzie on drums, piano and banjo, and John Vallins on guitar, drums and clarinet. In September they released their debut single, "Excuses", which reached #19 on the local charts, and followed up with two further singles which were unsuccessful. At the end of 1967 the group broke up and Groves joined with Steve Kipner (ex-Steve & the Board) to form Steve and Stevie as a vocal harmony duo. The duo released a single, "Remains to Be Seen", in 1968 and were then joined by Vallins to form Rombo's World.

In 1969, Groves and Kipner travelled to the United Kingdom and formed a British-influenced pop group, Tin Tin, which was named after the main character of the popular Belgian cartoon strip The Adventures of Tintin. Bee Gees member Maurice Gibb introduced the duo to Robert Stigwood and they signed a one-album contract with Polydor Records. By that time they had been joined by Geoff Bridgford on drums, and Kipner was playing bass guitar, harpsichord, mellotron, percussion, piano, electric piano, tambourine, as well as singing. Gibb produced their debut self-titled album (February 1970) and played various instruments (bass guitar, drums, harpsichord, mellotron, organ) on about half the tracks, which bore a marked resemblance to the tight harmonies of the Bee Gees. The lead single, "Only Ladies Play Croquet", was issued in May 1969 but did not chart.

=== Mainstream success ===
Tin Tin's debut album initially sold poorly, and in 1970 they issued a second single "Toast and Marmalade for Tea", written by Groves. In May 1971 Vallins joined the line-up. In June "Toast and Marmalade for Tea" became a #10 hit on the Go-Set National Top 40, and it remained on the Australian Kent Music Report Singles Chart for 15 weeks. The dreamy ballad, with lead vocals by Kipner, was belatedly released as a single in mid-1971 in the US, and it reached #20 on the Billboard Hot 100. The song featured just eight lines of nursery rhyme-like lyrics repeated over a distinctive "vibrato" piano (achieved by manipulating the recorded tape reel) and electric guitar backing. The song gradually builds in intensity adding acoustic guitar, bass guitar, drums, a string orchestra, and finally brass instruments, and is Tin Tin's best-remembered song. The album appeared on the Billboard 200. While seldom played on oldies radio today, "Toast and Marmalade for Tea" is regarded by some critics as one of the finest and most ambitious singles by a one hit wonder and a late psychedelic classic.

Tin Tin's next single, "Come on Over Again", (1970) did not chart. It was followed by "Is That the Way?" in 1971, which peaked at #59 on the Billboard Hot 100, ahead of their second album, Astral Taxi (December 1971). For the album they were joined by Carl Keats (aka Carl Groszmann) on rhythm guitar, a former bandmate from Steve & the Board. After their unexpected success, Tin Tin toured with The Bee Gees on their 1972 American tour. Non-album singles, "Talking Turkey" (1972), "I'm Afraid" and "It's a Long Way to Georgia" (both 1973) followed but did not chart. Another single, "Strange One", was released under the name Quire, also on the Polydor label, but had very little success.

=== Separate ways ===
After Tin Tin disbanded in 1973, Kipner went on to write and produce songs for Chicago ("Hard Habit to Break"), Olivia Newton-John ("Physical" and "Twist of Fate"), Christina Aguilera, 98 Degrees and Dream. In 1975, Groves returned to Australia and worked as a singer-songwriter, co-writing (with Brian Dawe) "On the Loose", which was performed by Marty Rhone to win the Australian Popular Song Contest. Groves formed his own group, Steve Groves Band, and released his version of "On the Loose (Again)" in November 1976. Vallins teamed up with Kipner's father, Nat, to co-write "Too Much, Too Little, Too Late" for Johnny Mathis and Deniece Williams, which was a number-one hit on the Billboard Hot 100 in March 1978.

== Discography ==
=== Albums ===
- Tin Tin (1970)
- Astral Taxi (1971)

=== Singles ===
- "Only Ladies Play Croquet" b/w "He Wants to Be a Star" (1969)
- "Toast and Marmalade for Tea" b/w "Manhattan Woman" (1970) – AU #10, US #20, Can #11
- "Come on Over Again" b/w "Back to Winona" (1970)
- "Shana" b/w "Rocky Mountain" (1971)
- "Is That the Way" b/w "Swans on the Canal" (1971) – US #59, AU #99
- "Talking Turkey" b/w "The Cavalry Are Coming" (1972)
- "Strange One" b/w "Halfway Up the Hill" (1972)
- "I'm Afraid" b/w "Handle Me Easy" (1973)
- "It's a Long Way to Georgia" b/w "Can't Get Over You" (1974)
