= Maurice Gibb =

British musician (1949–2003)

Maurice Gibb CBE
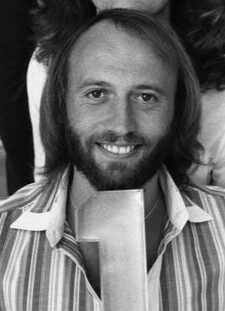
- Gibb in 1977
- Born: Maurice Ernest Gibb; 22 December 1949; Douglas, Isle of Man
- Died: 12 January 2003 (aged 53); Miami Beach, Florida, U.S.
- Occupations: Musician; singer; songwriter; record producer
- Years active: 1955–2002
- Spouses: Lulu (m. 1969; div. 1975); Yvonne Spenceley (m. 1975)
- Children: 2
- Parents: Hugh Gibb (father); Barbara Gibb (mother)
- Relatives: Barry Gibb (brother); Robin Gibb (twin brother); Andy Gibb (brother); Steve Gibb (nephew); Spencer Gibb (nephew)
- Musical career
- Origin: Douglas, Isle of Man
- Genres: Rock; pop; soul; disco
- Instruments: Vocals; bass; keyboards; guitar
- Labels: Polydor; Atco; Spin; Beacon; Pye; Capitol; RCA; Audiotrax
- Formerly of: Bee Gees; The Rattlesnakes

Maurice Ernest Gibb (/ˈmɒrɪs/; 22 December 1949 – 12 January 2003) was a British musician and songwriter. He achieved global fame as a member of the Bee Gees pop group, considered one of the most successful pop-rock groups of all time. Although his elder brother Barry Gibb and fraternal twin brother Robin Gibb were the group's main lead singers, most of their albums included at least one or two songs featuring Maurice's lead vocals, including "Lay It on Me", "Country Woman" and "On Time".

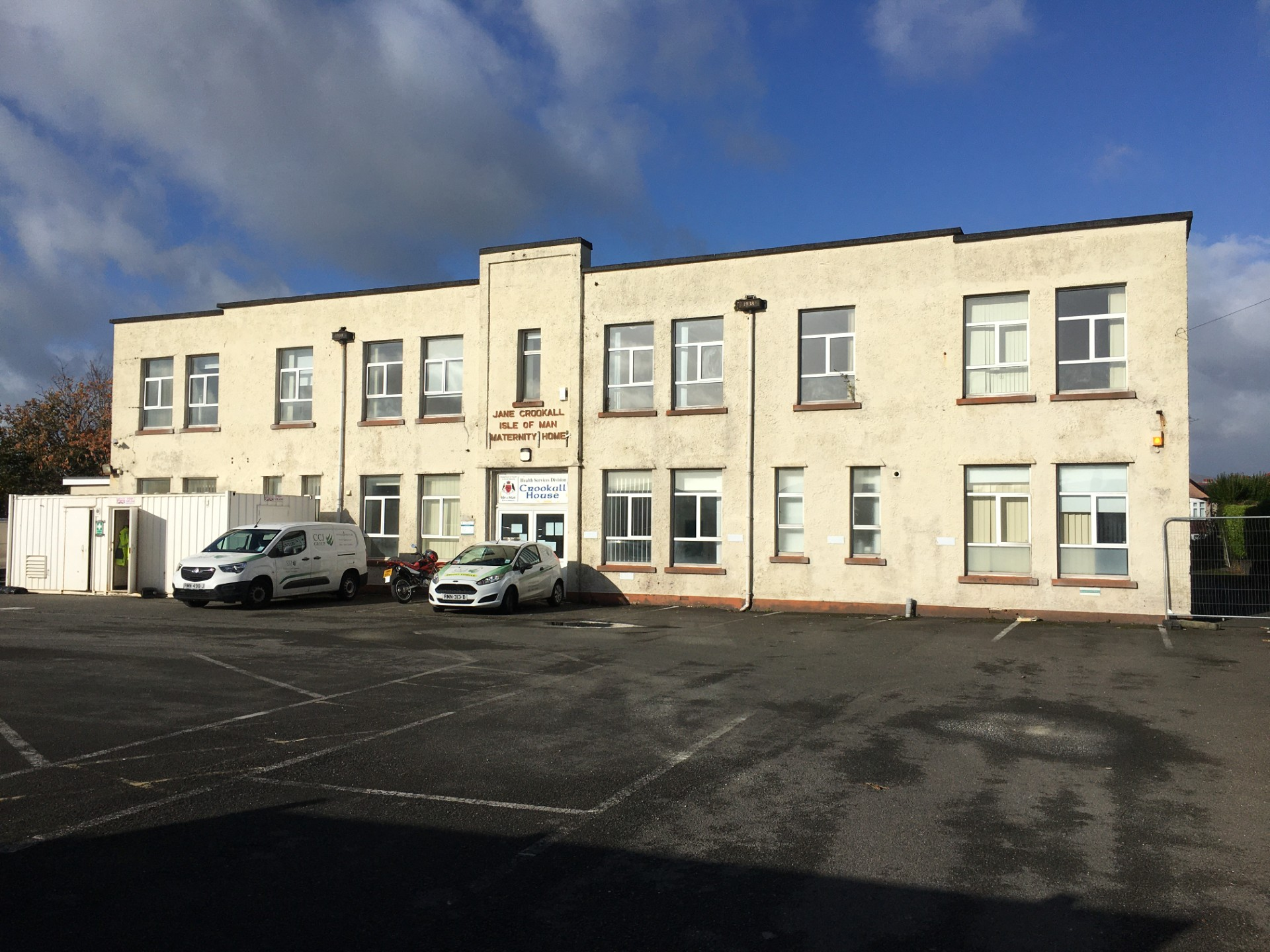
The Jane Crookall Maternity Home, Douglas Isle of Man, where Maurice and Robin Gibb were born on 22 December 1949.

Gibb started his music career in 1955 in Manchester, England at the age of five joining the skiffle-rock and roll group the Rattlesnakes, which later evolved into the Bee Gees in 1958 after spending three years in Manchester when they moved to Australia. They returned to England, where they achieved worldwide fame. In 2002, the Bee Gees were appointed as CBEs for their "contribution to music". Following Gibb's unexpected death in 2003, his son collected his award at Buckingham Palace in 2004.

Maurice Gibb's earliest musical influences included the Everly Brothers, Cliff Richard, and Paul Anka; the Mills Brothers and the Beatles were significant later influences. During the Bee Gees' temporary break-up in 1969–1970, Maurice released his first solo single, "Railroad", but his first solo album, The Loner, has never been released.

== 1949–1958: early years and the Rattlesnakes ==
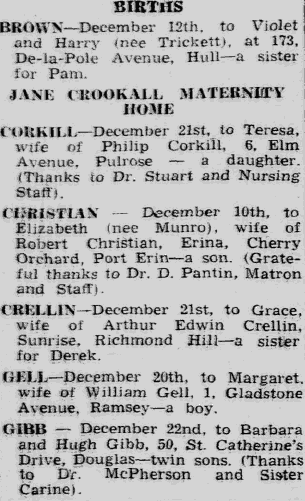
Record of the birth of Maurice & Robin Gibb (Isle of Man Examiner, 23 December 1949)

Maurice Ernest Gibb was born in Douglas, Isle of Man, on 22 December 1949, the son of Hugh Gibb, a drummer, and his wife Barbara (née Pass), 35 minutes after his fraternal twin, Robin Gibb. Aside from Robin, he had one sister, Lesley, and one additional brother, Barry (another brother, Andy, would be born in 1958).

In January 1955, the Gibb family moved back to their hometown in Manchester, England. Around that time, Gibb and his brothers were heard harmonising by their parents. Also in 1955, he started his music career when he joined the skiffle/rock-and-roll group the Rattlesnakes with his brothers and two friends, Paul Frost and Kenny Horrocks, who were their neighbours. The group's first major appearance was on 28 December 1957 when they performed at a local Gaumont cinema where children were invited to sing between films. They had planned to sing along to a 78 rpm record which Lesley had just been given as a Christmas present, but on the way Gibb dropped and broke it, so they sang live. The audience were pleased by their singing, which may have been the song "Wake Up Little Susie" by the Everly Brothers.

== 1958–2003: Bee Gees ==
=== 1958–1969: From the triplet to the quintet of the Bee Gees and disagreement about lead vocal frequency between Barry and Robin Gibb ===
When Gibb was eight years old, he emigrated to Redcliffe, in Queensland, Australia, with his family. Shortly afterward, he and his brothers formed the Bee Gees. By January 1963, the Gibbs moved to Sydney. The group's first single was "The Battle of the Blue and the Grey" but it failed to chart. Around 1963, the Gibb brothers worked with Judy Stone, Johnny Devlin and Jimmy Hannan. By 1964, Gibb made his first appearance as an instrumentalist on the beat-influenced "Claustrophobia". Also in 1964, the Gibb brothers worked with Johnny Devlin and Trevor Gordon. Around 1965, the Gibb brothers worked with Trevor Gordon, Michelle Rae and Noeleen Batley.

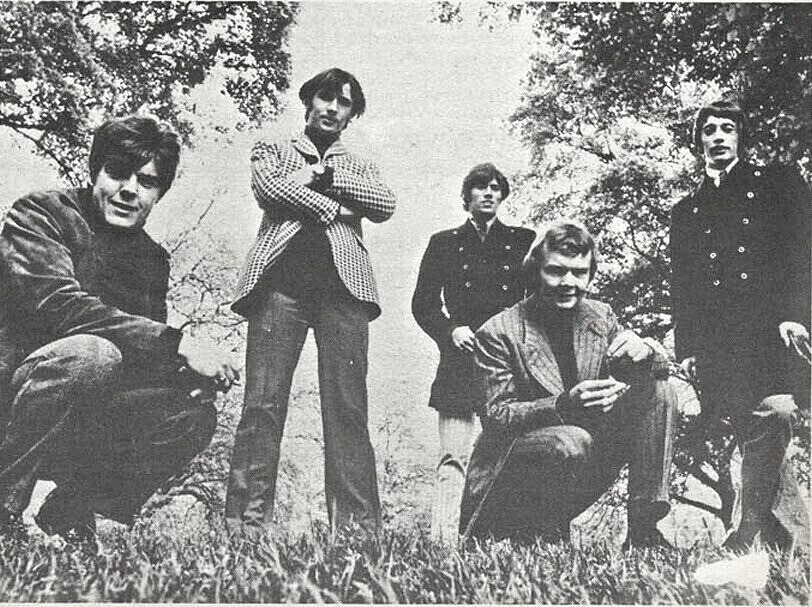
Gibb (second from left) with the Bee Gees in 1967, when the band was a quintet

In 1966, the three Gibb brothers wrote their first song, "The Storm". Also that year, Gibb began his career as the guitarist and bassist for the band; at around the same time he recorded his first solo song, "All by Myself", on which he also played guitar. Around 1966, the Gibb brothers worked with Bip Addison, Sandy Summers, Anne Shelton, Vince Melouney, April Bryon, MPD Ltd, Ray Brown and the Whispers, Ronnie Burns, Lori Balmer, Marty Rhone, Vyt, Python Lee Jackson, Dennis Knight, Barrington Davis, Jenene and Jon Blanchfield. Their second album, Spicks and Specks (1966), included "Where Are You", Gibb's first solo writing credit to be released.

"Maurice is closer to my attitudes and ideas. He has the same kind of humour as I have. We have other common interests like playing chess. He's the kind of guy who will come over and give you a hand washing the car."

— Colin Petersen, drummer for the Bee Gees on telling his band mates' personalities

In March 1967, the Gibb brothers worked with Billy J. Kramer recording "Town of Tuxley Toymaker, Part 1". Around the same time, Colin Petersen and Vince Melouney joined the Bee Gees. In the middle of 1967 Bee Gees' 1st was released. The album was praised by the critics who compared it to the Beatles' Sgt. Pepper's Lonely Hearts Club Band which was released weeks earlier. AllMusic's Bruce Eder wrote that Gibb's Mellotron on "Every Christian Lion Hearted Man Will Show You" 'was close in the spirit of the Moody Blues and was opened by a Gregorian chant.' The band's first number 1 single in the UK, "Massachusetts" was released in September 1967. In early 1968, the Horizontal was released. In August 1968, the Marbles released their first and only successful hit "Only One Woman" a song co-written by Gibb. In the middle of 1968, the band's third international LP Idea included the song "Kitty Can", which features Gibb's high harmony vocal, with Barry Gibb singing low harmony. In early 1969, they released Odessa, which features Gibb's solo vocals on "Suddenly" and "I Laugh in Your Face". On 19 March 1969, the same day that Robin Gibb announced his plans as a solo artist, Gibb and his bandmates recorded and later released "Tomorrow Tomorrow".

=== 1969–1970: Robin's departure from the Bee Gees and the duo period of the group ===
Maurice and Barry Gibb alone comprised the Bee Gees on the 1969 album Cucumber Castle during Robin Gibb's absence as a soloist. They sang the hit "Don't Forget to Remember" (which reached number two on the UK chart while Robin's first solo single, "Saved by the Bell", also reached number two) and follow up singles; "IOIO" and "Tomorrow, Tomorrow" with Barry taking lead and Maurice providing harmony vocals, but the duo version of the group enjoyed dwindling success. A supergroup in 1969 called the Fut was formed at a Tin Tin session and they recorded "Have You Heard the Word" while Gibb was still a Bee Gee, and released later as a single, the band consisting of Gibb on vocals/bass/guitar, Steve Kipner and Steve Groves on vocals with Billy Lawrie also providing background vocals. "Have You Heard the Word" features Gibb impersonating John Lennon, and Beatles fans thought that it was a lost Beatles song which had not been previously released. In 1985, Yoko Ono attempted to register the song as a Lennon composition.

On 1 December 1969, Maurice and brother Barry announced to the world that the Bee Gees had broken up.

=== 1970–1979: A break from the Bee Gees' dissolution, first solo album and initial singles and the reunion of the group ===
I suppose it was a good thing to get it out of my system, but at the same time, I never thought we would never sing together again. I started off intending to make go of it, but I soon found something was missing. I'd write songs and want desperately to play them to my brothers, but because of all the squabbles, I didn't feel I could. Then our record company unintentionally seemed to be trying to sabotage our solo careers. Distribution problems hit my solo single, ['Railroad'] Barry's first single, ['I'll Kiss Your Memory'] and Robin's second single ['One Million Years']

— Gibb, on telling his first experience as a solo artist

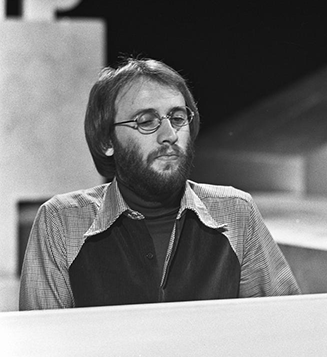
Gibb on TopPop in 1973.

In April 1970 Gibb released his first solo single, "Railroad" backed with "I've Come Back". His debut solo album, The Loner, has not yet been released. All of the songs on the album feature guitar work by Stone the Crows' Leslie Harvey. In May 1970 the album Sing a Rude Song was released in the UK with Gibb singing lead vocals on the three songs on the album. By 1976, New Blood Records issued Bee Gees Information which was credited to Gibb and features four songs from The Loner, but was only a limited edition for fan club, although the EP has no title but the picture sleeve of that has the club name ("Bee Gees Information") in large letters. In 1970, he formed a supergroup the Bloomfields with Billy Lawrie and they recorded a short version of "The Loner", which was released as a single in 1972 on Pye Records and intended for the film Bloomfield.

The Bee Gees reunited on 21 August 1970. Maurice later began taking a few lead vocals on a Bee Gees tracks in the 70s such as "Lay It on Me", "Country Woman", "On Time" and "You Know It's For You".

=== 1980–2003: Continuous solo albums and late musical contributions ===
In 1981, Gibb recorded some instrumental tracks for his unreleased instrumental album Strings and Things, including "Image of Samantha", which seems refer to his daughter Samantha.

In 1982, Gibb appeared at the San Remo Festival and performed "Wildflower", a Bee Gees song on which he provided lead vocals from Living Eyes. In 1983, Gibb re-recorded "On Time" at the same time as "Hold Her in Your Hand". By February 1984, he collaborated with arranger Jimmie Haskell for the film soundtrack of A Breed Apart, recorded at Gold Star Studios in Los Angeles. By March, he recorded "Miami, A Musical Score", this song was later used for a promotional film in Miami. His second single "Hold Her in Your Hand" was only issued in UK, Australia and South Africa. In September 1986, the Bee Gees began writing and recording songs for their upcoming album ESP. on which Maurice took lead vocal on the song "Overnight".

Gibb wrote and recorded the instrumental "The Supernaturals" in July 1985; it was later dubbed on the film of the same name, and he also appeared on the film doing a cameo appearance. On 24 April 2001, The Bee Gees released their 23rd and final studio album, This Is Where I Came In, which included his songs, "Walking on Air" and "Man in the Middle".

== Death ==
Gibb died suddenly from a cardiac arrest at the age of 53 at Mount Sinai Medical Center in Miami Beach, Florida, on 12 January 2003, following surgery for a twisted intestine.

A private funeral was attended by about 200 family and friends, including Michael Jackson and Harry Wayne Casey. After the service, his body was cremated. Journalist and family friend Jennifer Valoppi said, "It was emotional, there was humor. Everybody talked about how this was a man who really celebrated life and so this was a celebration of his life." Nat Kipner, who managed the Bee Gees early in their career in Australia in 1966, also attended the service. Barry and Robin Gibb told the BBC about Maurice's death, "The fact that they had to operate on Maurice during the shock of cardiac arrest is very questionable." Barry said, "None of the sequence of events have yet made sense to us."

Robin Gibb spoke to Mojo magazine about Maurice's death in 2003: "We were kids together, and teenagers. We spent the whole of our lives with each other because of our music. I can't accept that he's dead. I just imagine he's alive somewhere else." Barry and Robin ceased performing as a group for a time, but later decided to perform occasionally under the Bee Gees banner until Robin died at the age of 62, from liver and kidney failure due to colorectal cancer, on 20 May 2012.

== Influences ==
Gibb's influences were the Beatles, the Everly Brothers, Cliff Richard, Paul Anka and the Mills Brothers. According to Gibb, he listened to the Beatles' early records when he was a child and was later influenced by Paul McCartney's bass guitar-playing. Talking about the song "Have You Heard the Word" by the Fut, on which Gibb sang and played bass, he said that "We were just getting ready to do some tracks and we were just doing nothing and I was fartin' around on the bass. I was a big Paul freak. He was a great teacher for me." Gibb added that "I could play every bass lick he [McCartney] played", especially "Michelle", saying that its bassline was "really tasteful stuff, and way ahead, way ahead of his time".

== Musicianship ==
=== Recognition ===
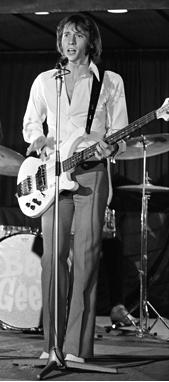
Gibb played bass on Dutch television Twien in 1968

DJ Paul Gambaccini said: "Maurice was the talented multi-instrumentalist, I mean here is a guy who played keyboards, guitar, bass and percussion."

Bruce Eder of AllMusic declared the track "Back Home" had "the loudest guitar ever heard on a Bee Gees record".

In the reunited Bee Gees from 1987 onwards, Gibb was the group's resident expert on all technical phases of recording, and co-ordinated musicians and engineers to create much of the group's sound.

=== Instrumentalist ===
Gibb contributed guitar and electronic organ on the debut Bee Gees album The Bee Gees Sing and Play 14 Barry Gibb Songs (1965). After that, he commenced his bass playing on the following album Spicks and Specks (1966) while playing guitar and keyboards. His proficiency in guitar reflected on the track "Country Woman", "Back Home", "Lay It on Me", and "Every Second, Every Minute".

He usually performed piano or electronic keyboard in both studios and live performances. Songs including "Words", "Lonely Days" and "How Can You Mend a Broken Heart" were listed in a priority of the Bee Gees concerts. Apart from that, he experimented various keyboards, such as harpsichord on "I Can't See Nobody", Mellotron on "Every Christian Lion Hearted Man Will Show You" and Moog synthesizer on "Sweet Song of Summer".

Throughout his experience as an instrumentalist, his bass playing was the most notable among all his instruments played, known for his distinctive syncopated funk bass lines for the foundation of Bee Gees' driving disco sound. Meanwhile, he often performed guitar during live performances. From 1987 onwards, he spontaneously played any instrument he knew with the Bee Gees.

He once used the guitar given by John Lennon on the song "She Keeps On Coming" (2001). In a continuity link for the song on the Top Of The Pops 2 special, in support of the album This Is Where I Came In Robin mentioned Lennon's guitar and Maurice confirmed it was his Epiphone. Some articles say it was Lennon's acoustic guitar on the song "This Is Where I Came In".

=== Vocals ===
On average, Maurice sang lead on one or two songs for each album and he was the lead vocalist on some Bee Gees tracks including "On Time", "Lay It on Me", "Closer Than Close", and his last song "Man in the Middle". His first composition is "All by Myself" recorded in 1966 but not released until 1970 on Inception/Nostalgia. On the Bee Gees' live performances of "Nights on Broadway", Maurice sang falsetto rather than Barry who originally sang falsetto on the studio recording. He also showcases his vocal talent on his unreleased LP The Loner.

His comic personality shone on stage during Bee Gees concerts when the brothers would perform an acoustic medley. Many times, Maurice would mock Robin while he was singing or pretend he was bored during the song "Holiday" (Maurice did not sing on the original record), among other things.

=== Songwriting ===
As a songwriter, Gibb contributed primarily to melody, with his brothers writing the lyrics that they would sing on the finished song (for the most part). It is difficult to identify his contributions because the songs were so shaped to the singer, but his brothers' continued writing collaboration with him on solo projects shows how much they relied on him. He was sometimes known as "the quiet one" for his less obvious contributions to the group, but privately he was a good teller of stories, who immensely enjoyed talking with fans. His reputation as a mild-mannered, stabilising influence with two very ambitious brothers continued through his life.

=== Studio collaborations ===
In 1966, Gibb became a session musician in Australia for other artists including Bip Addison, Anne Shelton, April Bryon, Barrington Davis and singer Jon. Around 1969, Gibb worked with his next-door neighbour, Beatle Ringo Starr, and the result was the track "Modulating Maurice" but it was not released. Gibb played piano on the track "Saved by the Bell" as well as bass on "Mother and Jack" both songs performed by Robin Gibb for his first solo album.

Around 1970, Gibb played piano on George Harrison's song "Isn't It a Pity" as a part of his first triple solo album, All Things Must Pass. In the recording studio he met Genesis' Phil Collins, Phil Spector, Ringo Starr, Billy Preston and Harrison. In 1971, he produced Lulu's 1971 song "Everybody Clap", which features Gibb on guitar, Leslie Harvey on guitar, former Manfred Mann and Cream member Jack Bruce on bass, and Led Zeppelin's John Bonham on drums. Bonham and his wife, Pat Philips became friends with Gibb and Lulu. Also in that year, he played bass on Billy Lawrie's 1973 song "Freedom". Future Wings and former Thunderclap Newman guitarist Jimmy McCulloch played guitar on that song, and McCulloch suggests that it was recorded at around the same time as Lulu's "Everybody Clap", with Stone the Crows' Maggie Bell providing backing vocals. On 17 January 1972, Gibb produced, with Billy Lawrie, "Baby Come on Home", released as a single also in that year. In April 1972, Gibb produced Jimmy Stevens' album Don't Freak Me Out (called Paid My Dues in US). The same year, Gibb produced Drift Away, an album released by Bob Saker and Mike Berry; it includes a cover version of "On Time". In 1973, Gibb produced and played bass on Jimmy Stevens' unreleased numbers with musicians Alan Kendall, Jimmy McCulloch, Pete Willsher, Zoot Money and singer Paul Jones. In August 1973, Gibb participated on Andy Gibb's first recording session, performing two new songs.

In 1978, Gibb produced with Steve Klein the Osmonds' album Steppin' Out, which features a cover version of the Bee Gees' "Rest Your Love on Me". Also in 1978, Gibb composed "The Love That Was Lost", with Blue Weaver on keyboard and arranged by Mike Lewis, who also arranged for the disco group KC and the Sunshine Band. In 1980, Gibb co-wrote with Tim Rice "Last Affair of the Heart", which was recorded by Elaine Paige at AIR Studios in London along with "Secrets" and "Carried Away". In 1982, Gibb took part in Barry's original demo recording of the song "Eyes That See in the Dark", a song intended for Kenny Rogers' album of the same name. In August 1982, Gibb wrote and recorded "Spirit of the Snow" and intended for the film A Christmas Carol. Gibb worked with Robin on his three albums How Old Are You? (1983), Secret Agent (1984) and Walls Have Eyes (1985). Gibb co-wrote "Shine, Shine" with his brother Barry and keyboardist George Bitzer, the song later became a Top 40 for Barry in the US. In 1985, Gibb sang background vocals on Larry Gatlin's songs "Indian Summer", available on Gatlin's album Smile with Gatlin and Roy Orbison on lead vocals; another track "Didn't We Call It (Falling in Love)" was not released. In 1986, Gibb produced Carola's album Runaway. Also in 1986, Gibb participated on the Bunbury songs "Up the Revolution", "Fight (No Matter How Long)", "Bunbury Afternoon" and "Seasons".

One of Gibb's last recordings was on the demo of "I Cannot Give You My Love" on which he played keyboards with his brother Barry taking the lead vocals. The song was intended for Cliff Richard.

== Personal life ==
Gibb met Scottish pop singer Lulu through Colin Petersen in 1967. Lulu recalls about Maurice, "I thought Maurice was cute, so I said, 'In that case, tell him to stop talking about me and take me out', He did just that, I never expected much to come from this, but in fact our relationship grew, after a fashion. Going steady is quite the wrong way to describe what was happening between us. Going unsteady might better sum up the way we fell in and out with each other". According to Lulu, she, Maurice and Robert Stigwood watched Pink Floyd at the Saville Theatre in London on 1 October 1967. Later, after his relationship with Lulu had become public knowledge, he said: "Lulu and I met on the Top of the Pops TV show three months ago, and then at the Saville Theatre in London last month".

Later in 1968, Lulu was seen in public with Davy Jones of the Monkees; Jones was also a friend of Maurice. As Gibb recalled, "Davy Jones was a good friend of mine, I broke it off with Lulu over the phone and Davy called me up and said 'I am going to ask Lu to dinner with some friends, is that all right?' I said, 'Yes, I am not going out with her anymore, have a ball' and threw the phone down. They then took so many photos of them and made it look like a six-month romance, but she had only been out with him that one night, she did not even want to go out. She phoned me the next day and she was crying, saying she was sorry". Maurice later regretted not accepting her apology. "We just grew up, that's all," Maurice admitted. "We were miserable apart and when we started going out again, it got so that I didn't want to be with anyone. I used to phone her up from Los Angeles about twice a day. Then she'd call me back. We used to make about 90-minute calls".

Gibb and Lulu married on 18 February 1969 and separated in 1973. Their careers and his heavy drinking forced them apart and they divorced, childless. The divorce was finalised on 21 August 1975. Gibb later said they both drank: "We didn't have any responsibilities, we'd just party."

In her autobiography, Barbara Windsor claimed to have had a brief affair with him.

=== Family ===
He married his second wife, Yvonne Spenceley Gibb, on 17 October 1975. They had two children, Samantha and Adam. It's also speculated that a man named Nick Endacott is Maurice's illegitimate child based on DNA evidence, but he has no claim as an heir. Their marriage lasted until his death. Maurice's alcoholic nadir came in 1991, when he pulled a gun on his wife and children after a month-long bender. They left him and immediately went to brother Barry's house, refusing to come back until he had done something about his drinking. Maurice went into rehab, calling Yvonne and telling her he was going to stay because he wanted to stop drinking. She said that that was the call she had been waiting for.

=== Substance abuse and recovery ===
Gibb said he had "battled the booze" since the 1970s. John Lennon introduced him to his favourite drink, scotch and coke: "If he had given me cyanide, I would have drunk the cyanide, I was so in awe of the man." He would go out drinking with his neighbour, Ringo Starr. According to Barry, it got to the point where he became unreliable, and he would have to feel his way along the wall prior to going onstage.

One factor in Maurice's recovery was the active intervention of his brothers, who had recently lost their youngest brother Andy. In an interview, Maurice acknowledged that his final years of alcohol abuse had been driven by his failure to reach Andy before his death, and his subsequent guilt.

After rehab, Maurice started to rediscover his family again, spending quality time with them. To celebrate this, he and Yvonne renewed their wedding vows in 1992. The ceremony was attended not only by many members of their families but many of the friends Gibb made while at the rehabilitation centre. Maurice would remain sober until his death.

== Legacy ==
Maurice Gibb was inducted into the Rock and Roll Hall of Fame in 1997 as a member of The Bee Gees.

Wyclef Jean recorded "Jive Talkin'" in 2005 and Sheryl Crow recorded "To Love Somebody" in 2005 as a tribute for him. A novel entitled Souls Stick Around: A Tale of the Black Hills and Maurice Gibb, was published in March 2012 by Bee Gees fan and author Dawnette Owens.

A recording studio at Chorlton High School, one of the schools the brothers attended, commemorates Gibb. In honouring Gibb, his brother Barry Gibb noted: "Mo was a real McCartney bass freak, as a lot of us were. He would pick up on all the things that McCartney would [do]. Maurice was very good on different instruments, you know. Good lead guitarist, good bass player, good keyboard player. He was versatile. He loved playing bass more than anything else, I think, at that time."

=== Australian Songwriters Hall of Fame ===
The Australian Songwriters Hall of Fame was established in 2004 to honour the lifetime achievements of some of Australia's greatest songwriters.

Year	Nominee / work	Award	Result
2022	Barry Gibb, Maurice Gibb and Robin Gibb	Australian Songwriters Hall of Fame	inducted

== Discography ==
Unreleased albums

Album details
The Loner
- Recorded: 1969–1970
A Breed Apart
- Recorded: 1984

Singles

Year	Single	Peak chart positions				Album
Year	Single	UK	US	Malaysia	Singapore	Album
1970	"Railroad"	—	—	6	9	The Loner
1984	"Hold Her in Your Hand"	—	—	—	—	A Breed Apart
1999	"The Bridge"	—	—	—	—	Mythology
"—" denotes releases did not chart

== Filmography ==
List of acting performances
Title	Year	Role	Notes
Cucumber Castle	1970	Prince Marmaduke, King of Jelly	Film; also writer
Sgt. Pepper's Lonely Hearts Club Band	1978	Bob Henderson	Film
The Supernaturals	1986	Union Soldier	Film (uncredited)
