= The Impressions discography =

The discography of the Impressions, an American R&B and soul group, includes 20 studio albums and 78 singles.

== Albums ==
=== Studio albums ===
Year	Album	Chart positions		Record label
Year	Album	US Pop	US R&B	Record label
1963	The Impressions	43	—	ABC-Paramount
1964	The Never Ending Impressions	52	—	ABC-Paramount
1964	Keep On Pushing	8	4	ABC-Paramount
1965	People Get Ready	23	1	ABC-Paramount
1965	One by One	104	4	ABC-Paramount
1966	Ridin' High	79	4	ABC-Paramount
1967	The Fabulous Impressions	184	16	ABC
1968	We're a Winner	35	4	ABC
1968	This Is My Country	107	5	Curtom
1969	The Versatile Impressions	—	—	ABC
1969	The Young Mods' Forgotten Story	104	21	Curtom
1970	Check Out Your Mind!	—	22	Curtom
1972	Times Have Changed	192	27	Curtom
1973	Preacher Man	204	31	Curtom
1974	Finally Got Myself Together	176	16	Curtom
1975	First Impressions	115	13	Curtom
1976	Loving Power	195	24	Curtom
1976	It's About Time	—	—	Cotillion Records
1979	Come to My Party	—	—	Chi-Sound
1981	Fan the Fire	—	—	Chi-Sound
"—" denotes the album failed to chart

=== Soundtracks ===
Year	Album	Chart positions		Record label
Year	Album	US Pop	US R&B	Record label
1974	Three the Hard Way	202	26	Curtom
"—" denotes the album failed to chart

=== Compilation albums ===
Year	Album	Chart positions		Record label
Year	Album	US Pop	US R&B	Record label
1963	For Your Precious Love	—	—	Vee-Jay Records
1965	Greatest Hits	83	2	ABC-Paramount
1968	The Best of the Impressions	172	23	ABC
1970	The Best Impressions: Curtis, Sam & Fred	—	23	Curtom
1971	16 Greatest Hits	180	23	ABC
1973	Curtis Mayfield / His Early Years with the Impressions	180	—	ABC
1977	The Vintage Years	199	—	Sire
1989	Definitive Impressions	—	—	Kent
1997	The Very Best of the Impressions	—	—	Rhino
2001	Ultimate Collection	—	—	Hip-O
"—" denotes the album failed to chart

== Singles ==
Year	Single	Chart positions			Album
Year	Single	US Pop	US R&B	UK	Album
1958	"For Your Precious Love" b/w "Sweet Was the Wine" (Non-album track) (as Jerry Butler & The Impressions)	11	3	—	For Your Precious Love
1958	"Come Back My Love" b/w "Love Me" (as The Impressions featuring Jerry Butler)	—	29	—	Non-album tracks
1958	"The Gift of Love" b/w "At the County Fair"	—	—	—	For Your Precious Love
1959	"Listen" b/w "Shorty's Got to Go"	—	—	—	Non-album tracks
1959	"Lovely One" b/w "Senorita I Love You" (from For Your Precious Love)	—	—	—	Non-album tracks
1959	"All Through the Night" b/w "Meanwhile, Back in My Heart"	—	—	—	Non-album tracks
1960	"Say That You Love Me" b/w "A New Love"	—	—	—	For Your Precious Love
1961	"Gypsy Woman" b/w "As Long as You Love Me"	20	2	—	The Impressions
1962	"Don't Leave Me" b/w "I Need Your Love" (from The Impressions)	—	—	—	Non-album track
1962	"Grow Closer Together" b/w "Can't You See" (Non-album track)	99	—	—	The Impressions
1962	"Senorita I Love You" b/w "Say That You Love Me"	—	—	—	For Your Precious Love
1962	"Little Young Lover" b/w "Never Let Me Go"	96	—	—	The Impressions
1962	"Minstrel and Queen" b/w "You've Come Home"	113	—	—	The Impressions
1963	"I'm the One Who Loves You" b/w "I Need Your Love"	73	—	—	The Impressions
1963	"I'm So Proud" b/w "Never Let Me Go" (from The Impressions)	14	—	—	The Never Ending Impressions
1963	"Sad, Sad Girl and Boy" b/w "Twist and Limbo"	84	—	—	The Impressions
1963	"It's All Right" b/w "You'll Want Me Back" (Non-album track)	4	1	—	The Impressions
1964	"Talking About My Baby" b/w "Never Too Much Love" (Non-album track)	12	2	—	Keep On Pushing
1964	"Girl You Don't Know Me" b/w "Woman Who Loves Me"; Cancelled single	—	—	—	The Never Ending Impressions
1964	"I'm So Proud" b/w "I Made a Mistake" (from Keep On Pushing)	14	2	—	The Never Ending Impressions
1964	"Keep On Pushing" b/w "I Love You (Yeah)"	10	1	—	Keep On Pushing
1964	"You Must Believe Me" b/w "See the Real Me"	15	3	—	People Get Ready
1964	"Amen" /	7	1	—	Greatest Hits
1965	"Long, Long Winter"	—	35	—	Keep On Pushing
1965	"People Get Ready" /	14	3	—	People Get Ready
1965	"I've Been Trying"	133	35	—	Keep On Pushing
1965	"Woman's Got Soul" b/w "Get Up and Move"	29	9	—	People Get Ready
1965	"Meeting over Yonder" b/w "I've Found That I Lost" (from People Get Ready)	48	12	—	Non-album tracks
1965	"I Need You" /	64	26	—	Non-album tracks
1965	"Never Could You Be"	—	35	—	Non-album tracks
1965	"Just One Kiss from You" b/w "Twilight Time"	76	—	—	One by One
1965	"You've Been Cheatin'" b/w "Man, Oh Man" (Non-album track)	33	12	—	The Best of the Impressions
1966	"Since I Lost the One I Love" b/w "Falling in Love with You" (from One by One)	90	—	—	Non-album track
1966	"Too Slow" b/w "No One Else"	91	—	—	Ridin' High
1966	"Can't Satisfy" b/w "This Must End"	65	12	—	The Best of the Impressions
1966	"Love's a Comin'" b/w "Wade in the Water" (Non-album track)	—	—	—	The Fabulous Impressions
1967	"You Always Hurt Me" b/w "Little Girl"	96	20	—	The Fabulous Impressions
1967	"You've Got Me Runnin'" b/w "It's Hard to Believe" (from People Get Ready)	—	50	—	Non-album track
1967	"I Can't Stay Away from You" b/w "You Ought to Be in Heaven"	80	34	—	The Fabulous Impressions
1967	"We're a Winner" b/w "It's All Over" (from The Fabulous Impressions)	14	1	—	We're a Winner
1968	"We're Rolling On (Part 1)" b/w "We're Rolling On (Part 2)"	59	17	—	The Best of the Impressions
1968	"Fool for You" b/w "I'm Loving Nothing"	22	3	—	This Is My Country
1968	"I Loved and I Lost" b/w "Up, Up and Away"	61	9	—	We're a Winner
1968	"This Is My Country" b/w "My Woman's Love"	25	8	—	This Is My Country
1968	"Don't Cry My Love" b/w "Sometimes I Wonder" (from People Get Ready)	71	44	—	The Versatile Impressions
1969	"My Deceiving Heart" b/w "You Want Somebody Else" (from This Is My Country)	104	23	—	The Young Mods' Forgotten Story
1969	"East of Java" b/w "Just Before Sunrise"	—	—	—	The Versatile Impressions
1969	"Seven Years" b/w "The Girl I Find"	84	15	—	The Young Mods' Forgotten Story
1969	"Choice of Colors" b/w "Mighty Mighty (Spade & Whitey)"	21	1	—	The Young Mods' Forgotten Story
1969	"Say You Love Me" b/w "You'll Always Be Mine"	58	10	—	Check Out Your Mind!
1970	"Amen (1970)" /	110	44	—	The Best Impressions...Curtis, Sam & Fred
1970	"Wherever She Leadeth Me"	128	31	—	The Young Mods' Forgotten Story
1970	"Check Out Your Mind" b/w "Can't You See"	28	3	—	Check Out Your Mind!
1970	"(Baby) Turn On to Me" b/w "Soulful Love" (from The Young Mods' Forgotten Story)	56	6	—	Check Out Your Mind!
1971	"Ain't Got Time" b/w "I'm So Proud" (from The Best Impressions...Curtis, Sam & Fred)	53	12	—	Non-album track
1971	"Love Me" b/w "Do You Wanna Win" (from Check Out Your Mind!)	94	25	—	Times Have Changed
1971	"Inner City Blues (Make Me Wanna Holler)" b/w "We Must Be in Love" (from Check Out Your Mind!)	—	—	—	Times Have Changed
1972	"This Love's for Real" b/w "Times Have Changed"	—	41	—	Times Have Changed
1973	"I Need to Belong to Someone" b/w "Love Me"	—	—	—	Times Have Changed
1973	"Preacher Man" b/w "Times Have Changed" (from Times Have Changed)	—	—	—	Preacher Man
1973	"I'm Loving You" b/w "Thin Line"	—	—	—	Preacher Man
1973	"If It's in You to Do Wrong" b/w "Times Have Changed" (from Times Have Changed)	—	26	—	Finally Got Myself Together
1974	"Finally Got Myself Together (I'm a Changed Man)" b/w "I'll Always Be Here"	17	1	—	Finally Got Myself Together
1974	"Something's Mighty, Mighty Wrong" b/w "Three the Hard Way"	—	28	—	Three the Hard Way (Soundtrack)
1975	"Sooner or Later" b/w "Miracle Woman" (Non-album track)	68	3	—	First Impressions
1975	"Same Thing It Took" b/w "I'm So Glad"	75	3	—	First Impressions
1975	"Loving Power" /	103	11	—	Loving Power
1975	"First Impressions"	—	—	16	First Impressions
1976	"Sunshine" b/w "I Wish I'd Stayed in Bed"	—	36	—	Loving Power
1976	"This Time" b/w "I'm a Fool for Love"	—	40	—	It's About Time
1976	"I Saw Mommy Kissing Santa Claus" b/w "Silent Night"	—	—	—	Funky Christmas (Various artists)
1977	"You'll Never Find" b/w "Stardust"	—	99	—	It's About Time
1977	"Can't Get Along" b/w "You're So Right for Me"	—	42	—	Non-album tracks
1979	"All I Wanna Do Is Make Love to You" b/w "Sorry"	—	—	—	Come to My Party
1980	"All I Wanna Do Is Make Love to You" b/w "Maybe I'm Mistaken"	—	—	—	Come to My Party
1981	"For Your Precious Love" (re-recorded version) b/w "You're Mine"	—	58	—	Fan the Fire
1981	"Love, Love, Love" b/w "Fan the Fire"	—	—	—	Fan the Fire
1987	"Can't Wait 'Til Tomorrow" b/w "Love Workin' on Me"	—	91	—	Non-album tracks
"—" denotes the single failed to chart

- ^{*} The figures from November 30, 1963, to January 23, 1965, are from the Cashbox, because the Billboard then did not publish an R&B singles chart.

== DVD release ==
- "Movin On Up: The Music and Message of Curtis Mayfield and The Impressions" (2008)

== See also ==
- Curtis Mayfield discography
