= Curtis Mayfield discography =

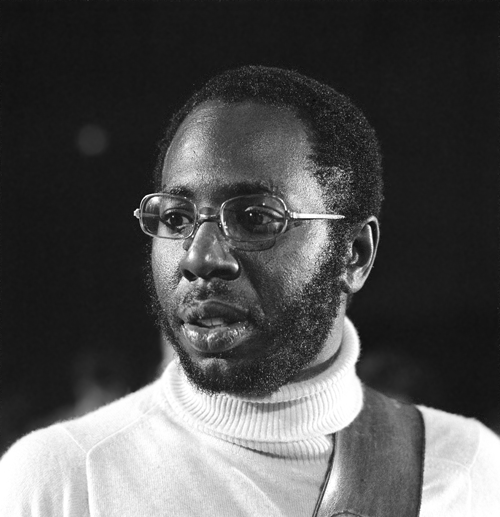

This is the discography of musician Curtis Mayfield.

== Albums ==
=== Albums with the Impressions ===
Year	Album	Chart positions		Record label
Year	Album	US	US R&B	Record label
1963	The Impressions	43	—	ABC-Paramount
1964	The Never Ending Impressions	52	—	ABC-Paramount
1964	Keep on Pushing	8	4	ABC-Paramount
1965	People Get Ready	23	1	ABC-Paramount
1965	One by One	104	4	ABC-Paramount
1966	Ridin' High	79	4	ABC-Paramount
1967	The Fabulous Impressions	184	16	ABC
1968	We're a Winner	35	4	ABC
1968	This Is My Country	107	5	Curtom
1969	The Versatile Impressions	—	—	ABC
1969	The Young Mods' Forgotten Story	104	21	Curtom
1970	Check Out Your Mind!	—	22	Curtom

=== Solo albums ===
Year	Album	Peak chart positions			Certification	Note
Year	Album	US	US R&B	UK	Certification	Note
1970	Curtis	19	1	30	US: Gold	
1971	Curtis/Live!	21	3	—		Live
1971	Roots	40	6	—		
1972	Super Fly	1	1	26	US: Gold	Soundtrack
1973	Back to the World	16	1	—	US: Gold	
1973	Curtis in Chicago	—	—	—		Live
1974	Claudine	35	1	—		Soundtrack
1974	Sweet Exorcist	39	2	—		
1974	Got to Find a Way	76	17	—		
1975	Let's Do It Again	20	1	—		Soundtrack
1975	There's No Place Like America Today	120	13	—		
1976	Give, Get, Take and Have	171	16	—		
1976	Sparkle	18	1	—		Soundtrack
1977	Never Say You Can't Survive	173	32	—		
1977	Short Eyes	—	59	—		Soundtrack
1977	A Piece of the Action	—	51	—		Soundtrack
1978	Do It All Night	—	52	—		
1978	Almighty Fire	63	12	—		Soundtrack
1979	Heartbeat	42	19	—		
1980	Something to Believe In	128	33	—		
1980	The Right Combination	180	53	—		
1981	Love Is the Place	—	39	—		
1983	Honesty	—	49	—		
1985	We Come in Peace with a Message of Love	—	84	—		
1988	Live in Europe	—	—	—		Live
1990	Take It to the Streets	—	59	—		
1990	The Return of Superfly	—	72	—		Soundtrack
1990	People Get Ready: Live at Ronnie Scott's	—	—	—		Live
1996	New World Order	137	24	44		
"—" denotes releases that did not chart or were not released in that territory.

=== Compilations ===
- The Anthology: 1961–1977 (1992)
- A Man Like Curtis – The Best of Curtis Mayfield (1992)
- People Get Ready: The Curtis Mayfield Story (1996)
- Get Down to the Funky Groove (1996) [Charly]
- The Very Best of Curtis Mayfield (1997) R&B #91
- Give It Up – The Very Best of the Curtom Years 1970–1977 (1997)
- Beautiful Brother. The Essential Curtis Mayfield (2000)
- Soul Legacy (2001)
- Greatest Hits (2006)

== Singles and charted songs ==
=== Chart hits by Mayfield ===
Year	Single	Peak chart positions			Certification	Album
Year	Single	US	US R&B	UK	Certification	Album
1970	"(Don't Worry) If There's a Hell Below, We're All Going to Go"	29	3	—		Curtis
1971	"Move On Up"	—	—	12	BPI: Platinum	Curtis
1971	"Get Down"	69	13	—		Roots
1972	"Beautiful Brother of Mine"	—	45	—		Roots
1972	"We Got to Have Peace"	—	32	—		Roots
1972	"Freddie's Dead"	4	2	—	US: Gold	Superfly
1972	"Superfly"	8	5	—	US: Gold	Superfly
1973	"Future Shock"	39	11	—		Back to the World
1973	"If I Were Only a Child Again"	71	22	—		Back to the World
1973	"Can't Say Nothin"	88	16	—		Back to the World
1974	"Mother's Son"	—	15	—		Got to Find a Way
1974	"Sweet Exorcist"	—	32	—		Sweet Exorcist
1974	"Kung Fu"	40	3	—		Sweet Exorcist
1975	"So in Love"	67	9	—		There's No Place Like America Today
1976	"Only You Babe"	—	8	—		Give, Get, Take and Have
1976	"Party Night"	—	39	—		Give, Get, Take and Have
1977	"Do Do Wap Is Strong in Here"	—	29	—		Short Eyes
1977	"Show Me Love"	—	41	—		Never Say You Can't Survive
1978	"Do It All Night"	—	96	—		Do It All Night
1978	"You Are, You Are"	—	34	—		Do It All Night
1978	"No Goodbyes"	—	—	65		Do It All Night
1979	"This Year"	—	40	—		Non-album single
1979	"You're So Good to Me"	—	46	—		Heartbeat
1980	"Love Me, Love Me Now"	—	48	—		Something to Believe In
1980	"Tripping Out"	—	46	—		Something to Believe In
1981	"She Don't Let Nobody (But Me)"	102	15	—		Love is the Place
1982	"Toot An' Toot An' Toot"	—	22	—		Love is the Place
1982	"Hey Baby"	—	68	—		Honesty
1985	"Baby It's You"	—	69	—		We Come in Peace with a Message of Love
1988	"Move On Up (Live)"	—	—	87		Live in Europe
1990	"Superfly '90"	—	—	48		The Return of Superfly
1996	"New World Order"	—	49	—		New World Order
1997	"Back to Living Again"	—	88	—		New World Order
1997	"No One Knows About a Good Thing"	—	61	—		New World Order
"—" denotes releases that did not chart or were not released in that territory.

=== Chart hits by other artists written by Mayfield ===
Mayfield was a prolific composer. In addition to writing or co-writing almost all of the hit singles he had as a member of The Impressions and as a solo artist, Mayfield also wrote (and sometimes produced) numerous hits for other artists. The following is a list of chart hits, arranged chronologically, that were written (or co-written) by Curtis Mayfield and performed by artists other than Mayfield and/or The Impressions:

Year	Title	Artist	Peak chart positions		
Year	Title	Artist	US R&B	US	UK
1960	"He Will Break Your Heart"	Jerry Butler	1	7	—
1961	"Find Another Girl"	Jerry Butler	10	27	—
1961	"I'm A-Telling You"	Jerry Butler	8	25	—
1963	"Mama Didn't Lie"	Jan Bradley	8	14	—
1963	"Mama Didn't Lie"	The Fascinations	—	108	—
1963	"The Monkey Time"	Major Lance	2	8	—
1963	"Hey Little Girl"	Major Lance	12	13	—
1963	"Rainbow"	Gene Chandler	11	47	—
1963	"Found True Love"	Billy Butler & the Four Enchanters	—	134	—
1963	"Man's Temptation"	Gene Chandler	17	71	—
1964	"Think Nothing About It"	Gene Chandler	28 (Note: Billboard magazine did not publish an R&B chart during 1964; these chart positions are from Cashbox magazine.)	107	—
1964	"Um, Um, Um, Um, Um, Um"	Major Lance	1	5	40
1964	"Just Be True"	Gene Chandler	4	19	—
1964	"Gotta Get Away"	Billy Butler & the Enchanters	38	101	—
1964	"It Ain't No Use"	Major Lance	33	68	—
1964	"Girls"	Major Lance	25	68	—
1964	"It's Too Late"	Walter Jackson	10	67	—
1964	"Nevertheless"	Billy Butler & the Chanters	—	102	—
1964	"Need to Belong"	Jerry Butler	2	31	—
1964	"Bless Our Love"	Gene Chandler	4	39	—
1964	"Rhythm"	Major Lance	3	24	—
1965	"Rainbow '65 (Part I)"	Gene Chandler	2	69	—
1965	"Sometimes I Wonder"	Major Lance	13	64	—
1965	"I Can't Work No Longer"	Billy Butler & the Chanters	6	60	—
1965	"Come See"	Major Lance	20	40	—
1965	"What Now"	Gene Chandler	18	40	—
1965	"Ain't It a Shame"	Major Lance	20	91	—
1965	"Nothing Can Stop Me"	Gene Chandler	3	18	41 (Note: Chart position is from 1968.)
1965	"(Gonna Be) Good Times"	Gene Chandler	40	92	—
1965	"(I've Got a Feeling) You're Gonna Be Sorry"	Billy Butler	—	103	—
1965	"You Can't Hurt Me No More"	Gene Chandler	40	92	—
1966	"(I'm Just a) Fool for You"	Gene Chandler	—	88	—
1966	"He Will Break Your Heart"	The Righteous Brothers	—	91	—
1966	"Say It Isn't So"	The Fascinations	47	—	—
1967	"Girls Are Out to Get You"	The Fascinations	13	92	32 (Note: Chart position is from 1971.)
1967	"I'm In Love"	The Fascinations	47	—	—
1967	"Danger! She's A Stranger"	The Five Stairsteps	16	89	—
1968	"Don't Change Your Love"	The Five Stairsteps	15	59	—
1969	"Baby Make Me Feel So Good"	The Five Stairsteps	12	101	—
1969	"We Must Be in Love"	The Five Stairsteps	17	88	—
1969	"I Thank You Baby"	June & Donnie (Donny Hathaway & June Conquest)	45	—	—
1969	"Stay Close to Me"	The Five Stairsteps	—	91	—
1970	"Gypsy Woman"	Brian Hyland	—	3	42
1970	"Stay Away from Me (I Love You Too Much)"	Major Lance	13	67	—
1970	"Must Be Love Coming Down"	Major Lance	31	119	—
1970	"I'm So Proud"	The Main Ingredient	13	49	—
1972	"I Thank You"; Reissue of 1969 recording "I Thank You Baby", with shorter title and modified artist credit.	Donny Hathaway & June Conquest	41	92	—
1972	"Give Me Your Love"	Barbara Mason	9	31	—
1974	"(It's Gonna Be) A Long, Long Winter"	Linda Clifford	75	—	—
1974	"On and On" (from Claudine)	Gladys Knight & the Pips	2	5	—
1974	"Um, Um, Um, Um, Um, Um" (New version)	Major Lance	59	—	—
1975	"Let's Do It Again"	The Staple Singers	1	1	—
1975	"He Don't Love You (Like I Love You)"	Tony Orlando & Dawn	—	1	—
1976	"New Orleans"	The Staple Singers	4	70	—
1976	"Something He Can Feel"	Aretha Franklin	1	28	—
1976	"Jump"	Aretha Franklin	17	72	—
1976	"Hooked on Your Love"	Aretha Franklin	17	—	—
1976	"Look into Your Heart"	Aretha Franklin	10	82	—
1977	"A Piece of the Action"	Mavis Staples	47	—	—
1977	"It's Too Late"; New version	Walter Jackson	75	—	—
1977	"Curious Mind (Um, Um, Um, Um, Um, Um)"	Johnny Rivers	—	41	—
1978	"More Than Just a Joy"	Aretha Franklin	51	—	—
1979	"Between You Baby and Me"	Linda Clifford	14	—	—
1983	"I'm So Proud"	Deniece Williams	28	—	—
1984	"One Love/People Get Ready"	Bob Marley and the Wailers	—	—	5
1985	"People Get Ready"	Jeff Beck & Rod Stewart	—	48	49
1992	"Giving Him Something He Can Feel"	En Vogue	1	6	16
1994	"I'm So Proud"	The Isley Brothers	64	—	—
"—" denotes releases that did not chart or were not released in that territory.
