= The Anthology: 1961–1977 =

The Anthology 1961-1977

Greatest hits album by Curtis Mayfield and The Impressions
- Released: December 8, 1992
- Recorded: 1961–1977
- Genre: Soul, funk
- Length: 132:26
- Label: Curtom
- Producer: Curtis Mayfield; Andy McKaie; Johnny Pate

The Anthology 1961-1977 is a compilation album of songs by Curtis Mayfield when he was with the Impressions and when he was solo. Of the 40 tracks, 30 are from Mayfield's time with the Impressions. The album includes liner notes written by Robert Pruter. In 2003, the album was ranked number 178 on Rolling Stone's 500 Greatest Albums of All Time, maintaining the rating in a 2012 revised list.

== Critical reception ==
Professional ratings
Review scores
Source	Rating
AllMusic	5/5 stars
Entertainment Weekly	A
Tom Hull	A+
Rolling Stone	4/5 stars

In his review for The Village Voice, music critic Robert Christgau felt The Anthology was an "A+"; in his view the selection could have used less of the early songs with the Impressions and more of Mayfield's "radically sporadic solo career", though for Christgau "a songwriter this gifted has no trouble filling two CDs, and he's his own aptest vocal interpreter." In his 2000 guide to Curtis Mayfield for Rolling Stone, Christgau gave it four-and-a-half out of five stars and said that, apart from the few "generic" Chicago R&B selections, the lesser-known songs on the album "vividly demonstrate why Mayfield is mentioned in the same breath as Smokey Robinson."

== Track listing ==
Disc one

1. "Gypsy Woman" (from The Impressions, 1963)
2. "Grow Closer Together" (from The Impressions, 1963)
3. "Never Let Me Go" (from The Impressions, 1963)
4. "Little Young Lover" (from The Impressions, 1963)
5. "Minstrel and Queen" (from The Impressions, 1963)
6. "I'm the One Who Loves You" (from The Impressions, 1963)
7. "Sad Sad Girl and Boy" (from The Impressions, 1963)
8. "It's All Right" (from The Impressions, 1963)
9. "Talking About My Baby" (from The Never Ending Impressions, 1964)
10. "I'm So Proud" (from The Never Ending Impressions, 1964)
11. "Keep On Pushing" (from Keep on Pushing, 1964)
12. "You Must Believe Me" (from People Get Ready, 1965)
13. "See the Real Me" (from People Get Ready, 1965)
14. "Amen" (from Keep on Pushing, 1964)
15. "I've Been Trying" (from Keep on Pushing, 1964)
16. "People Get Ready" (from People Get Ready, 1965)
17. "It's Hard to Believe" (from People Get Ready, 1965)
18. "Woman's Got Soul" (from People Get Ready, 1965)
19. "Meeting Over Yonder"
20. "I Need You"
21. "You've Been Cheatin'"
22. "Man Oh Man"
23. "Can't Satisfy"
24. "We're a Winner" (from We're a Winner, 1968)
25. "I Loved and I Lost" (from We're a Winner, 1968)
26. "We're Rolling On (Part One)" (from We're a Winner, 1968)

Disc two

1. "Fool for You" (from This Is My Country, 1968)
2. "This Is My Country" (from This Is My Country, 1968)
3. "Choice of Colors" (from The Young Mods' Forgotten Story, 1969)
4. "Check Out Your Mind" (from Check Out Your Mind!, 1970)
5. "Move On Up" (from Curtis, 1970)
6. "(Don't Worry) If There's a Hell Below, We're All Going to Go" (from Curtis, 1970)
7. "The Makings of You" (from Curtis, 1970)
8. "Beautiful Brother of Mine" (from Roots, 1971)
9. "Freddie's Dead" (from Super Fly, 1972)
10. "Superfly" (from Super Fly, 1972)
11. "Pusherman" (from Super Fly, 1972)
12. "So in Love" (from There's No Place Like America Today, 1975)
13. "Only You Babe" (single edit (Give, Get, Take and Have), 1976)
14. "Do Do Wap Is Strong in Here" (single edit) (from Short Eyes, 1977)
