= People Get Ready: The Curtis Mayfield Story =

Compilation album by Curtis Mayfield
- Released: February 27, 1996
- Genre: Funk/Soul
- Label: Curtom

Professional ratings
Review scores
Source	Rating
Allmusic	4.5/5 stars

People Get Ready: The Curtis Mayfield Story is a three-disc box set compilation album by Curtis Mayfield. It covers his entire career up to 1996 (New World Order, Mayfield's last album, was released in 1997), including several songs from his tenure with The Impressions (tracks 1–12 on the first disc). It was released on Curtom on February 27, 1996.

== Track listing ==
All tracks are written by Curtis Mayfield, except where noted.

Disc 1
No.	Title	Original album	Length
1.	"Gypsy Woman"	The Impressions (1963)	2:21
2.	"It's All Right"	The Impressions (1963)	2:49
3.	"I'm So Proud"	The Never Ending Impressions (1964)	2:50
4.	"Keep on Pushing"	Keep on Pushing (1964)	2:33
5.	"Amen" (Mayfield, Johnny Pate)	Keep on Pushing (1964)	3:29
6.	"People Get Ready"	People Get Ready (1965)	2:38
7.	"Woman's Got Soul"	People Get Ready (1965)	2:18
8.	"We're a Winner"	We're a Winner (1968)	2:24
9.	"I Loved and I Lost"	We're a Winner (1968)	3:16
10.	"Fool for You"	This Is My Country (1968)	2:54
11.	"This is My Country"	This Is My Country (1968)	2:49
12.	"Choice of Colors"	The Young Mods' Forgotten Story (1969)	3:18
13.	"The Makings of You"	Curtis (1970)	3:44
14.	"(Don't Worry) If There's a Hell Below, We're All Going to Go"	Curtis (1970)	7:51
15.	"Move On Up"	Curtis (1970)	8:54
16.	"We People Who are Darker than Blue"	Curtis (1970)	6:03
17.	"Check Out Your Mind"	Check Out Your Mind! (1970)	3:53
18.	"Mighty Mighty (Spade and Whitey)" (live)	Curtis/Live! (1971)	6:58
19.	"Stone Junkie" (live)	Curtis/Live! (1971)	7:47

Disc 2
No.	Title	Original album	Length
1.	"Beautiful Brother of Mine"	Roots (1971)	7:28
2.	"Get Down"	Roots (1971)	5:48
3.	"We Got To Have Peace"	Roots (1971)	4:46
4.	"Freddie's Dead"	Superfly (1972)	5:28
5.	"Superfly"	Superfly (1972)	3:55
6.	"Give Me Your Love (Love Song)"	Superfly (1972)	4:18
7.	"Pusherman"	Superfly (1972)	5:03
8.	"Future Shock" (single edit)	Back to the World (1973)	3:38
9.	"If I Were Only a Child Again"	Back to the World (1973)	2:55
10.	"Can't Say Nothin'" (single edit)	Back to the World (1973)	3:38
11.	"Kung Fu" (single edit)	Sweet Exorcist (1974)	3:51
12.	"Sweet Exorcist"	Sweet Exorcist (1974)	3:52
13.	"To Be Invisible"	Sweet Exorcist (1974)	4:11
14.	"Mother's Son"	Got to Find a Way (1974)	6:06
15.	"Billy Jack"	There's No Place Like America Today (1975)	6:08
16.	"So in Love"	There's No Place Like America Today (1975)	5:12

Disc 3
No.	Title	Original album	Length
1.	"Only You Babe"	Give, Get, Take and Have (1976)	4:22
2.	"Party Night"	Give, Get, Take and Have (1976)	3:49
3.	"Mr. Welfare Man"	Give, Get, Take and Have (1976)	5:36
4.	"Show Me Love" (single edit)	Never Say You Can't Survive (1977)	3:47
5.	"Do Do Wap is Strong in Here"	Short Eyes (1977)	5:31
6.	"You Are, You Are"	Do It All Night (1978)	3:40
7.	"Do It All Night" (Mayfield, Gil Askey; single edit)	Do It All Night (1978)	3:41
8.	"You're So Good to Me" (Mayfield, Askey; single edit)	Heartbeat (1979)	3:38
9.	"Between You Baby and Me"	Heartbeat (1979)	4:44
10.	"Love's Sweet Sensation" (Frankie Bleu)	The Right Combination with Linda Clifford (1980)	3:51
11.	"Love Me, Love Me Now" (single edit)	Something to Believe In (1980)	4:51
12.	"Tripping Out" (Bunny Sigler; single edit)	Something to Believe In (1980)	3:53
13.	"She Don't Let Nobody (But Me)" (Mayfield, Dino Fekaris)	Love Is the Place (1982)	3:56
14.	"Baby It's You"	We Come In Peace With A Message Of Love (1985)	3:34
15.	"Homeless"	Take It to the Streets (1990)	7:33
16.	"Do Be Down"	Take It to the Streets (1990)	4:09
