= Check Out Your Mind! =

The Impressions

Studio album by The Impressions
- Released: 1970
- Genre: Chicago soul
- Length: 32:16
- Label: Curtom
- Producer: Curtis Mayfield

The Impressions chronology
The Young Mods' Forgotten Story (1969)	The Impressions (1970)	Times Have Changed (1972)

Check Out Your Mind! is the twelfth album by the American soul music group The Impressions, released in 1970 on Curtom Records. This album peaked at No. 22 on the US Billboard Top Soul Albums chart.

== Critical reception ==
Professional ratings
Review scores
Source	Rating
AllMusic	4/5 stars

AllMusic's John Bush, in a 4/5-star review, remarked "Just before he departed the Impressions for a solo career, Curtis Mayfield performed on one last album with the group. Check out Your Mind! saw Mayfield departing with class, driven by big, brassy nuggets of psychedelic soul...Despite the raised consciousness of the title, Check out Your Mind! also featured quite a few fine examples of traditional sweet soul... Still, there was much more great material than average, and the trio ended with style an eight-year reign as one of the most talented, intelligent, and successful of all soul groups."

== Track listing ==
All tracks are written by Curtis Mayfield.

No.	Title	Length
1.	"Check out Your Mind"	3:31
2.	"Can't You See"	3:17
3.	"You're Really Something Sadie"	3:42
4.	"Do You Want to Win?"	3:33
5.	"You'll Always Be Mine"	2:40
6.	"Only You"	2:40
7.	"Turn on to Me"	3:11
8.	"Madame Mary"	2:38
9.	"We Must Be in Love"	3:58
10.	"Say You Love Me"	3:06

== Personnel ==
The Impressions

- Curtis Mayfield - lead vocals, guitar
- Fred Cash - backing vocals
- Sam Gooden - backing vocals
- The Funk Brothers - instrumentation
