= The Impressions' Greatest Hits =

Greatest hits album by The Impressions
- Released: 1965
- Genre: R&B
- Label: ABC-Paramount

The Impressions chronology
People Get Ready (1965)	The Impressions' Greatest Hits (1965)	One by One (1965)

The Impressions' Greatest Hits is the first compilation album by R&B vocal group The Impressions.

AllMusic noted about the album, "But as a single album venture, if you can find it, it's well worth getting."

== Track listing ==
All tracks written by Curtis Mayfield unless noted.

Side A

1. "Gypsy Woman"
2. "Talking About My Baby"
3. "I'm So Proud"
4. "Keep On Pushing"
5. "Never Let Me Go" (Joseph Scott)
6. "It's All Right"

Side B

1. "You Must Believe Me"
2. "Sad, Sad Girl and Boy"
3. "I'm the One Who Loves You"
4. "Minstrel and Queen"
5. "Grow Closer Together"
6. "Amen" (Mayfield, Johnny Pate)
