= Ridin' High (The Impressions album) =

Studio album by The Impressions
- Released: 1966
- Genre: Chicago soul
- Label: ABC-Paramount
- Producer: Johnny Pate

The Impressions chronology
One by One (1965)	Ridin' High (1966)	The Fabulous Impressions (1967)

Professional ratings
Review scores
Source	Rating
AllMusic	3/5 stars
The Encyclopedia of Popular Music	3/5 stars

Ridin' High is an album by the American soul music group the Impressions, released in 1966.

== Track listing ==
All tracks written by Curtis Mayfield unless noted. "I Need To Belong To Someone" was recorded by the group three times: first, when they backed Jerry Butler on 1963 solo single (titled "Need to Belong"); second on this LP; and third on the Times Have Changed LP in 1972 featuring LeRoy Hutson (spoken intro) and Sam Gooden (lead).

Side one

1. "Ridin’ High" 2:25
2. "No One Else" 2:37
3. "Gotta Get Away" 2:28
4. "I Need to Belong to Someone" 3:25 (Curtis and Sam lead)
5. "Right on Time" 2:43
6. "I Need a Love" 2:25

Side two

1. "Too Slow", 2:44
2. "Man’s Temptation" 4:45
3. "That’s What Mama Say" 2:34
4. "Let It Be Me" (Gilbert Bécaud, Pierre Delanoë, Mann Curtis) 3:02
5. "I’m a Telling You" 2:41

== Personnel ==
The Impressions

- Curtis Mayfield - lead vocals, guitar
- Fred Cash - backing vocals
- Sam Gooden - backing vocals
- The Funk Brothers - instrumentation

== Charts ==
Year	Chart	Peak position
1966	Black Albums	4
1966	Pop Albums	79
