= One by One (The Impressions album) =

Studio album by The Impressions
- Released: 1965
- Genre: Chicago soul
- Label: ABC-Paramount
- Producer: Johnny Pate

The Impressions chronology
The Impressions' Greatest Hits (1965)	One by One (1965)	Ridin' High (1966)

Professional ratings
Review scores
Source	Rating
AllMusic	4/5 stars
The Encyclopedia of Popular Music	2/5 stars

One by One is an album by the American soul music group the Impressions, released in 1965. It consists mostly of cover songs, with only a few originals.

== Track listing ==
1. "Twilight Time" (Artie Dunn, Al Nevins, Buck Ram, Morty Nevins) – 2:17
2. "I Wanna Be Around" (Johnny Mercer, Sadie Vimmerstadt) – 2:15
3. "Nature Boy" (eden ahbez) – 2:24
4. "Just One Kiss from You" (Curtis Mayfield) – 2:37
5. "I Want to Be with You" (Lee Adams, Charles Strouse) – 3:17
6. "Answer Me, My Love" (Fred Rauch, Carl Sigman, Gerhard Winkler) – 2:43
7. "It's Not Unusual" (Gordon Mills, Leslie Reed) – 2:20
8. "Without a Song" (Edward Eliscu, Billy Rose, Vincent Youmans) – 3:18
9. "Falling in Love with You" (Mayfield) – 2:56
10. "My Prayer" (Georges Boulanger, Jimmy Kennedy) – 2:58
11. "Mona Lisa" (Jay Livingston, Raymond Evans) – wrongly credited to Sallie M. Sefrit and Mana Zucca – 2:28
12. "Lonely Man" (Mayfield) – 2:43

== Personnel ==
The Impressions

- Curtis Mayfield – lead vocals
- Fred Cash – backing vocals
- Sam Gooden – backing vocals
- Detroit Symphony Orchestra – instrumentation

with:

- Johnny Pate – arrangements, conductor

== Charts ==
USA – Album

Year	Chart	Peak position
1965	Black Albums	4
1965	Pop Albums	104

USA – Singles

Year	Song	Chart	Peak position
1965	Just One Kiss from You	Pop Singles	76
