= People Get Ready (disambiguation) =

"People Get Ready" is a 1965 song written by Curtis Mayfield and first recorded by the Impressions.

People Get Ready may also refer to:

- People Get Ready (The Impressions album), 1965
- People Get Ready (The Chambers Brothers album), 1966
- People Get Ready: The Curtis Mayfield Story, a box set by Curtis Mayfield, 1996
- People Get Ready (The Mooney Suzuki album), 2000
- People Get Ready (PE 2.0 album), 2014
- People Get Ready – A Tribute to Curtis Mayfield, 1993 tribute album
- People Get Ready, an album by Russell Watson, 2008
- People Get Ready (band), an American rock band
