= We're a Winner =

We're a Winner may refer to:

- We're a Winner (song), a 1967 single by The Impressions
- We're a Winner (album), a 1968 album by The Impressions
