= We're a Winner (album) =

Studio album by The Impressions
- Released: 1968
- Genre: Chicago soul
- Label: ABC Records
- Producer: Johnny Pate

The Impressions chronology
The Fabulous Impressions (1967)	We're a Winner (1968)	This Is My Country (1968)

Singles from We're a Winner
- 1. "We're a Winner" Released: December 1967; 2. "I Loved and I Lost" Released: June 1968

Professional ratings
Review scores
Source	Rating
AllMusic	4.5/5 stars
The Encyclopedia of Popular Music	2/5 stars
The New Rolling Stone Record Guide	3/5 stars

We're a Winner is an album by the American soul music group the Impressions, released in 1968. It was the group's last album for ABC Records; they moved on to Curtis Mayfield's Curtom Records.

== Track listing ==
All tracks composed by Curtis Mayfield; except where indicated. "We're Rolling On" Parts 1 and 2 are bonus tracks added for the 1994 and 2007 CD reissues of this album.

1. "We're a Winner" – 2:25
2. "Moonlight Shadows" – 3:11
3. "Let Me Tell the World" – 3:16
4. "I'm Gettin Ready" (Mayfield, Phil Upchurch) – 2:31
5. "Nothing Can Stop Me" – 3:16
6. "No One to Love" – 2:31
7. "Little Brown Boy" – 2:44
8. "I Loved and I Lost" – 2:31
9. "Romancing to the Folk Song" – 2:35
10. "Up, Up and Away" (Jimmy Webb) – 3:17
11. "We're Rolling On, Part 1"
12. "We're Rolling On, Part 2"

== Personnel ==
The Impressions

- Curtis Mayfield - lead vocals, guitar
- Fred Cash - backing vocals
- Sam Gooden - backing vocals
- The Funk Brothers - instrumentation
- Johnny Pate - conductor, arranger

== Charts ==
Year	Chart	Peak position
1968	Black Albums	4
1968	Pop Albums	35
