= The Very Best of Curtis Mayfield =

Greatest hits album by Curtis Mayfield
- Released: 1997
- Genre: Funk/Soul
- Label: Curtom / Rhino (cat# R2 7284)

Professional ratings
Review scores
Source	Rating
AllMusic	4.5/5 stars

The Very Best of Curtis Mayfield is the name of a Curtis Mayfield compilation album released by (at least) four different record labels with four different durations and audio track listings.

== Release history ==
On March 10, 1996, it was released on the Castle Music label, containing 16 audio tracks with a duration of 01:16:54. On March 4, 1997, it was released on the Rhino Records label, containing 16 audio tracks with a duration of 01:14:41. On June 9, 1998, it was released on the "Curtis/Cargo" label, containing 14 audio tracks. In 1998, it was released on the Beechwood Music label, containing 14 audio tracks on two vinyl discs. On April 24, 2006, it was released on the Charly Records label, containing 34 audio tracks on two CDs, which was an identical reIssue of The Definitive Collection released in 1996 on the Charly label. On January 29, 2007, it was released on the Charly Records label, containing 18 audio tracks on one CD.

== Track listing ==
The Very Best of Curtis Mayfield 1997 Rhino Entertainment Company (R2 72584) US & Canada

1. "(Don't Worry) If There's a Hell Below, We're All Going to Go"
2. "The Makings of You"
3. "Move On Up"
4. "Get Down"
5. "We Got to Have Peace"
6. "Freddie's Dead (theme From Superfly)"
7. "Superfly"
8. "Pusherman"
9. "Future Shock"
10. "Can't Say Nothin'"
11. "Kung Fu"
12. "So In Love"
13. "Only You Babe"
14. "Do Do Wap is Strong in Here"
15. "Between You Baby and Me"
16. "Do Be Down"
