= Finally Got Myself Together (I'm a Changed Man) =

Single by The Impressions

from the album Finally Got Myself Together
- B-side: "I'll Always Be Here"
- Released: 1974
- Genre: Soul, funk
- Length: 3:05
- Label: Curtom CR 1997
- Songwriter: Ed Townsend
- Producer: Ed Townsend

The Impressions singles chronology
"If It's in You to Do Wrong" (1973)	"Finally Got Myself Together (I'm a Changed Man)" (1974)	"Something's Mighty, Mighty Wrong" (1974)

"Finally Got Myself Together (I'm a Changed Man)" is a hit song by R&B group The Impressions, written and produced by Ed Townsend. Released from the album of the same name, it spent two weeks at number one on the R&B singles chart in June 1974. It also peaked at number 17 on the Billboard Hot 100 singles chart. In Canada the song reached number 36. This song was the group's biggest hit after the departure of lead singer Curtis Mayfield.
