= Amen (gospel song) =

Traditional gospel song

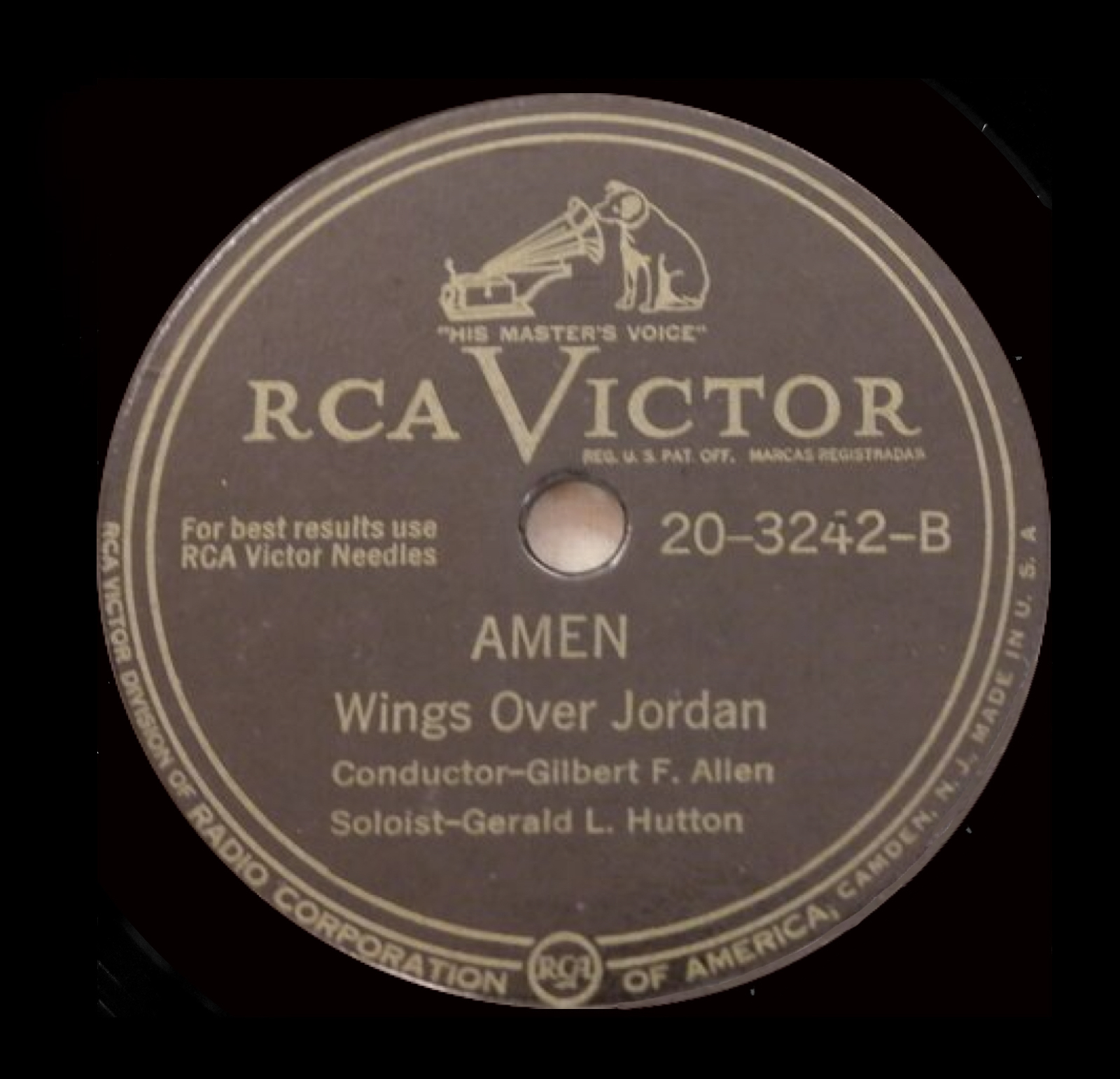

78 recording by Wings Over Jordan Choir
- Released: June 9, 1948
- Genre: Gospel
- Label: RCA Victor
- Songwriters: Hogan-Davis; Jester Hairston, arranger

"Amen"

Single by The Impressions

from the album Keep On Pushing
- B-side: "Long, Long Winter"
- Released: 1964
- Genre: Soul, R&B, Gospel
- Length: 3:32 (album version); 2:48 (single version)
- Label: ABC-Paramount
- Songwriters: Hogan-Davis; Jester Hairston, arranger (label mistakenly credits Jerry Goldsmith)
- Producer: Johnny Pate

"Amen" is a traditional gospel song written by Rev. Broadus Henry Hogan and Laura B. Davis; popularized by the Jester Hairston arrangement for the 1963 film Lilies of the Field, and the 1964 version by The Impressions on their album Keep On Pushing.

== Background ==
The song "Amen" was composed by Rev. Broadus Henry Hogan, a pastor at the North Side Baptist Church, in Indianapolis, Indiana, and Laura B. Davis. It was copyrighted by Homer A. Rodeheaver on October 1, 1935. Hogan and Davis also wrote the hymn, "On My Journey Home".

The first recording of the song was by the Wings Over Jordan Choir, who recorded it on June 9, 1948 with Gerald L. Hutton as soloist. Their next recording (1953) was on their album of the same name, Amen, which featured soloist James Pettit.; credit is attributed to "Hogan-Davis";.

In 1963, the song was arranged by Jester Hairston for the Sidney Poitier film Lilies of the Field. The Hairston arrangement is different from the Hogan-Davis song in that the verses are interpolated with the chorus and the text is a narrative of the life of Jesus Christ. It is this version that has been performed and recorded since the 1970s. Singer-songwriter for The Impressions, Curtis Mayfield, said, "I'd gone to see 'Lilies of the Field,' and the song in it, 'Amen', was very inspiring for me as was the movie . . . Of course, I'd decided to do a version of it. We put it together in the studio starting off with a musical 'swing low sweet chariot', and then we fell into that particular song with somewhat of a marching rhythm." The song was the first band's hit that Mayfield did not write. Mayfield inserted the title of the song "Keep on Pushing", which was recorded by The Impressions, in-between the lyrics of the song.

The song went to no. 1 on Cashbox Magazine's R&B chart for three weeks and reached no. 7 on the Billboard Hot 100 singles chart in 1964. The B-side, "Long, Long Winter", peaked at #35 on the Cashbox R&B chart. A new version was released by The Impressions in 1969 under the title "Amen (1970)", reaching #44 on the Billboard Best Selling Soul Singles chart in January 1970.

A dispute over copyright arose in the 1950s when the Schuman Music Corporation filed for copyright on May 2, 1957 with their Hairston version; while The Homer Rodeheaver Company renewed copyright for their Hogan, Davis, and Young version in 1963. In 1974, the Wings Over Jordan Choir listed the song in the public domain. This was also adopted by church hymnals beginning in 1970 with credit attributed to "various arrangers".

== Cover version ==
- In 1968, Otis Redding had a posthumous hit with his version of the song, reaching #15 on the R&B chart.
- Elvis Presley would often perform "Amen" as part of a medley with "I Got A Woman" in his live performances from 1971-77.
