= The Young Mods' Forgotten Story =

Studio album by The Impressions
- Released: May 1969
- Genre: Chicago soul
- Length: 25:26
- Label: Curtom
- Producer: Curtis Mayfield

The Impressions chronology
The Versatile Impressions (1969)	The Young Mods' Forgotten Story (1969)	The Best Impressions: Curtis, Sam & Fred (1970)

Singles from The Young Mod's Forgotten Story
- 1. "My Deceiving Heart" Released: February 1969; 2. "Seven Years" Released: April 1969; 3. "Choice of Colors" Released: June 1969

Professional ratings
Review scores
Source	Rating
AllMusic	4.5/5 stars
The Encyclopedia of Popular Music	4/5 stars

The Young Mods' Forgotten Story is an album by the American soul music group the Impressions. It was released in 1969 via Curtom Records.

== Production ==
Donny Hathaway worked as an arranger on the album.

== Critical reception ==
Billboard deemed The Young Mods' Forgotten Story a "smooth soul sampler of choice tunes." Colin Larkin called it "quintessential," writing that it "set the framework for [Curtis Mayfield's] solo work." The Edmonton Journal, reviewing a reissue, wrote that "the music, save for touches of wah-wah and (prescient) proto-funk on 'Mighty Mighty', was in many ways a step behind similar groups of the time."

== Track listing ==
All tracks composed by Curtis Mayfield

1. "The Young Mods' Forgotten Story" – 2:00
2. "Choice of Colors" – 3:15
3. "The Girl I Find" – 2:37
4. "Wherever You Leadeth Me" – 2:32
5. "My Deceiving Heart" – 2:49
6. "Seven Years" – 2:21
7. "Love's Miracle" – 2:24
8. "Jealous Man" – 2:34
9. "Soulful Love" – 2:30
10. "Mighty Mighty (Spade & Whitey)" – 2:21

== Personnel ==
- Curtis Mayfield – lead vocals, guitar, producer
- Fred Cash and Sam Gooden – backing vocals
- The Funk Brothers – instrumentation
- Donny Hathaway and Johnny Pate – arranger

== Charts ==
USA - Album

Year	Chart	Peak position
1969	Black Albums	21
1969	Pop Albums	104

USA - Singles

Year	Song	Chart	Peak position
1969	Choice of Colors	Black Singles	1
1969	Choice of Colors	Pop Singles	21
1969	My Deceiving Heart	Black Singles	69
1969	Seven Years	Pop Singles	84
1969	Seven Years	Black Singles	15
