= Keep On Pushing =

Studio album by the Impressions
- Released: June 1964
- Genre: Chicago soul Gospel
- Length: 31:53
- Label: ABC-Paramount
- Producer: Curtis Mayfield

The Impressions chronology
The Never Ending Impressions (1964)	Keep On Pushing (1964)	People Get Ready (1965)

Singles from Keep On Pushing
- 1. "Talking About My Baby / Never Too Much Love" Released: 1964; 2. "Keep On Pushing / I Love You (Yeah)" Released: 1964; 3. "Amen / Long, Long Winter" Released: 1964

Keep On Pushing is a studio album by the Impressions, released on ABC-Paramount in 1964. This was the group's biggest hit album ever, reaching number 8 on the Billboard 200 chart, the band's highest position on the chart, and number 4 on the Top R&B/Hip-Hop Albums chart. The title track, "Keep On Pushing," reached number 10 on the Billboard Hot 100 chart and number 1 on the Hot R&B/Hip-Hop Songs chart.

== Production ==
"Amen" was an African-American spiritual arranged and sung by Jester Hairston for the 1963 film Lilies of the Field, starring Sidney Poitier. Curtis Mayfield had been inspired by the film and the song "Amen" in particular: "Of course, I'd decided to do a version of it. We put it together in the studio starting off with a musical 'swing low sweet chariot', and then we fell into that particular song with somewhat of a marching rhythm."

The album cover has a photograph taken by Don Bronstein of the group pushing Mayfield's Jaguar E-Type.

== Critical reception ==
Professional ratings
Review scores
Source	Rating
AllMusic	4/5 stars

John Bush of AllMusic gave the album 4 stars out of 5, describing it as "an excellent introduction for pop audiences just waking up to the inspirational power of soul music's finest group." He said, "the album featured all the hallmarks of an Impressions set: impeccably smooth harmonies, the dynamic horn charts of Johnny Pate, and many more of Mayfield's irresistible songs (each with a clever spin on the usual love lyric as well as a strong sense of melody)."

Keep On Pushing was one of those displayed on the cover of Bob Dylan's 1965 album, Bringing It All Back Home. Bob Marley included "Amen" and "I Made a Mistake" as part of the regular set list of the Wailers.

In 2017, Pitchfork placed it at number 167 on the "200 Best Albums of the 1960s" list. Evan Minsker said, "Every song is crafted just as beautifully as the title track, with Pate's expert arrangements backing the trio's earworm harmonies."

== Track listing ==
All tracks are written by Curtis Mayfield, except where noted

Side one

1. "Keep On Pushing" – 2:30
2. "I've Been Trying" – 2:45
3. "I Ain't Supposed To" (Mayfield, Jerry Butler) – 2:28
4. "Dedicate My Song to You" (Mayfield, Alice Beard) – 1:52
5. "Long, Long Winter" – 2:48
6. "Somebody Help Me" – 3:15

Side two

1. "Amen" (trad.) – 3:30
2. "I Thank Heaven" – 2:30
3. "Talking About My Baby" – 2:33
4. "Don't Let It Hide" – 2:20
5. "I Love You (Yeah)" – 2:07
6. "I Made a Mistake" – 2:31

== Personnel ==
Credits adapted from liner notes.

The Impressions

- Curtis Mayfield – lead vocals, guitar, production
- Fred Cash – backing vocals
- Sam Gooden – backing vocals
- The Funk Brothers – instrumentation

Technical

- Johnny Pate – arrangements
- Don Bronstein – cover photography
- Bob Ghiraldini – liner photography
- Joe Lebow – liner design

== Charts ==
Chart	Peak position
US Billboard 200	8
US Top R&B/Hip-Hop Albums (Billboard)	4
