= The Never Ending Impressions =

Studio album by The Impressions
- Released: January 9, 1964
- Genre: Chicago soul
- Label: ABC-Paramount
- Producer: Johnny Pate

The Impressions chronology
The Impressions (1963)	The Never Ending Impressions (1964)	Keep on Pushing (1964)

Singles from Hey America
- 1. "I'm So Proud" Released: March 21, 1964

Professional ratings
Review scores
Source	Rating
AllMusic	2.5/5 stars
The Encyclopedia of Popular Music	4/5 stars

The Never Ending Impressions is an album by the American soul music group The Impressions which was released on January 9, 1964. It is the first album on which Impressions producer Johnny Pate worked with Curtis Mayfield. It pushed the idea of the trio as a supper-club act and included the ballad "I'm So Proud", a Top 20 hit on both the R&B and pop charts.

== Track listing ==
All tracks composed by Curtis Mayfield; except where indicated

1. "Sister Love"
2. "Little Boy Blue"
3. "Satin Doll" (Duke Ellington, Johnny Mercer, Billy Strayhorn)
4. "Girl You Don't Know Me"
5. "I Gotta Keep on Moving"
6. "You Always Hurt the One You Love" (Doris Fisher, Allan Roberts)
7. "That's What Love Will Do"
8. "I'm So Proud"
9. "September Song" (Maxwell Anderson, Kurt Weill)
10. "Lemon Tree" (Will Holt)
11. "Ten to One"
12. "A Woman Who Loves Me"

== Personnel ==
The Impressions

- Curtis Mayfield - lead vocals, guitar
- Sam Gooden - backing vocals
- Fred Cash - backing vocals
- The Wrecking Crew - instrumentation

== Charts ==
USA - Album

Year	Chart	Peak position
1964	Pop Albums	52

USA - Singles

Year	Song	Chart	Peak position
1964	I'm So Proud	Pop Singles	14
1964	I'm So Proud	Black Singles	14
