= Finally Got Myself Together =

Studio album by The Impressions
- Released: 1974
- Recorded: 1974
- Genre: Chicago soul
- Length: 25:26
- Label: Curtom
- Producer: Ed Townsend

The Impressions chronology
Preacher Man (1973)	Finally Got Myself Together (1974)	First Impressions (1975)

Singles from Finally Got Myself Together
- 1. "If It's in You to Do Wrong" Released: December 1973; 2. "Finally Got Myself Together (I'm a Changed Man)" Released: March 1974

Finally Got Myself Together is the fifteenth studio album by American soul music group the Impressions. The album peaked at No. 176 on the Billboard Top LPs chart and No. 16 on the Top Soul LPs chart in 1974.

== Track listing ==
1. "If It's in You to Do Wrong" – 4:43
2. "Finally Got Myself Together (I'm a Changed Man)" – 3:05
3. "I'll Always Be Here" – 2:59
4. "Miracle Woman" – 3:19
5. "We Go Back a Ways" – 3:50
6. "Guess What I've Got" – 3:51
7. "Try Me " – 5:17
8. "Don't Forget What I Told You" – 4:59

== Charts ==
Chart (1974)	Peak position
US Top LPs & Tape (Billboard)	176
US Top Soul LPs	16
