= Choice of Colors =

Single by The Impressions

from the album The Young Mods' Forgotten Story
- B-side: "Mighty Mighty Spade & Whitey"
- Released: 1969
- Genre: Soul
- Length: 3:18
- Label: Curtom CR 1943
- Songwriter: Curtis Mayfield
- Producer: Curtis Mayfield

The Impressions singles chronology
"Seven Years" (1969)	"Choice of Colors" (1969)	"Say You Love Me" (1969)

"Choice of Colors" is a 1969 pop/soul song, written by Curtis Mayfield for The Impressions. The song hit #1 on Billboard's R&B chart for one week, and went to #21 on the Billboard Hot 100.

== Chart positions ==
Chart (1969)	Peak position
U.S. Billboard Hot 100	21
U.S. Billboard Best Selling Rhythm & Blues Singles	1
