= We're a Winner (song) =

1967 single by The Impressions

Single by The Impressions

from the album We're a Winner
- B-side: "It’s All Over"
- Released: 1967
- Recorded: RCA Victor Studios, Chicago; Universal Studios, Chicago: 1967
- Genre: Soul
- Length: 2:24
- Label: ABC-Paramount 11022
- Songwriter: Curtis Mayfield
- Producer: Johnny Pate

The Impressions singles chronology
"You Ought to Be in Heaven" (1967)	"We're a Winner" (1967)	"We're Rolling On" (1967)

"We're a Winner" is a 1967 single recorded by The Impressions for the ABC-Paramount label. Written and produced by Impressions lead singer Curtis Mayfield, the song is notable as one of the most prominent popular recordings dealing with the subject of black pride. The phrase "We're a Winner" was later used as the motto of Mayfield's record label Curtom Records.

== Personnel ==
- Lead vocals and guitar by Curtis Mayfield
- Background vocals by Sam Gooden and Fred Cash
- Guitar by Phil Upchurch
- Bass guitar by Lenny Brown
- Drums by Billy Griffin
- Produced, arranged, and conducted by Johnny Pate

== Chart performance ==
The single peaked at number 14 on the Billboard Pop Chart, and was the number-one single on the Billboard R&B Chart during the week of March 9, 1968.

Chart (1967–68)	Peak position
US Billboard Hot 100	14
US Best Selling R&B Singles (Billboard)	1

== See also ==
- Civil rights movement in popular culture
