= People Get Ready (The Impressions album) =

Studio album by the Impressions
- Released: February 1965
- Genres: Chicago soul; gospel
- Length: 30:52
- Label: ABC-Paramount
- Producer: Johnny Pate

The Impressions chronology
Keep On Pushing (1964)	People Get Ready (1965)	The Impressions' Greatest Hits (1965)

Singles from People Get Ready
- 1. "You Must Believe Me" Released: 1964; 2. "People Get Ready" Released: 1965; 3. "Woman's Got Soul" Released: 1965

Professional ratings
Review scores
Source	Rating
AllMusic	4/5 stars

People Get Ready is a studio album by the Impressions, released on ABC-Paramount in 1965. It contains Curtis Mayfield's "People Get Ready", which was a successful single that had a significant impact on the civil rights movement. The album reached number 23 on the Billboard 200 chart and number 1 on the Top R&B/Hip-Hop Albums chart.

== Track listing ==
All tracks are written by Curtis Mayfield.

No.	Title	Length
1.	"Woman's Got Soul"	2:20
2.	"Emotions"	2:48
3.	"Sometimes I Wonder"	2:58
4.	"We're in Love"	2:28
5.	"Just Another Dance"	2:51
6.	"Can't Work No Longer"	2:21
7.	"People Get Ready"	2:40
8.	"I've Found Out That I've Lost"	2:51
9.	"Hard to Believe"	2:27
10.	"See the Real Me"	2:25
11.	"Get Up and Move"	2:13
12.	"You Must Believe Me"	2:30

== Personnel ==
Credits adapted from liner notes.

- Curtis Mayfield – lead vocals, guitar
- Fred Cash – backing vocals
- Sam Gooden – backing vocals
- The Funk Brothers – instrumentation
- Johnny Pate – arrangement, production

== Charts ==
Chart	Peak position
US Billboard 200	23
US Top R&B/Hip-Hop Albums (Billboard)	1

== See also ==
- List of Billboard number-one R&B albums of 1965
