= This Is My Country (The Impressions album) =

Studio album by The Impressions
- Released: November 1968
- Genre: Chicago soul
- Length: 29:13
- Label: Curtom
- Producer: Curtis Mayfield

The Impressions chronology
We're a Winner (1968)	This Is My Country (1968)	The Versatile Impressions (1969)

Professional ratings
Review scores
Source	Rating
AllMusic	4.5/5 stars
The Encyclopedia of Popular Music	3/5 stars

This Is My Country is an album by the soul group the Impressions, released in 1968. It was their first album released on Curtis Mayfield's label, Curtom Records.

== Production ==
"Gone Away" was written by Mayfield, Donny Hathaway, and Leroy Hutson. Hathaway also worked on "You Want Somebody Else".

== Critical reception ==
The A.V. Club called the album inspiring and influential, writing that "even at its most syrupy, Mayfield gives his tunes elbow room, a muscular pulse, and an emotional complexity that's vengeful and redemptive all at once." In a retrospective article, The Independent called it one of the 20 best albums of 1968, writing that "Mayfield gave notice of his own black pride on the stirring title track on which he both celebrates and condemns the country that his people populate."

== Track listing ==
All tracks composed by Curtis Mayfield; except where indicated

1. "They Don't Know" – 2:47
2. "Stay Close to Me" – 2:03
3. "I'm Loving Nothing" – 2:31
4. "Loves Happening" – 3:07
5. "Gone Away" (Donny Hathaway, Mayfield, Leroy Hutson) – 3:41
6. "You Want Somebody Else" (Billy Griffin, Donny Hathaway) – 3:12
7. "So Unusual" – 2:56
8. "My Woman's Love" – 3:02
9. "Fool for You" – 2:52
10. "This Is My Country" – 2:48

== Personnel ==
The Impressions

- Curtis Mayfield - lead vocals, guitar, production
- Fred Cash - backing vocals
- Sam Gooden - backing vocals
- The Funk Brothers - instrumentation

== Charts ==
Year	Chart	Peak position
1969	R&B & Soul Albums	5
1969	Pop Albums	107
