= The Impressions (album) =

Studio album by The Impressions
- Released: August 1963
- Recorded: July 1961–March 1962
- Genre: Chicago soul
- Label: ABC-Paramount
- Producer: Curtis Mayfield, Rory Glover, Jr.

The Impressions chronology
The Impressions (1963)	The Never Ending Impressions (1964)

Singles from The Impressions
- 1. "Gypsy Woman" Released: October 1961; 2. "It's All Right" Released: October 1963

Professional ratings
Review scores
Source	Rating
AllMusic	4.5/5 stars
The Encyclopedia of Popular Music	4/5 stars

The Impressions is the debut album by the American soul music group of the same name. It produced six chart hit singles, including their biggest hit, the Billboard top 10 pop smash "It's All Right", and the top 20 hit "Gypsy Woman".

After the departure of original Impressions lead singer Jerry Butler to a successful solo career, the other original members, brothers Arthur and Richard Brooks also left. The remaining original members, Curtis Mayfield, Sam Gooden and Fred Cash, chose not to replace them. Instead, they scaled down to a trio, and went on to become one of America's top R&B vocal groups.

== Track listing ==
All tracks composed by Curtis Mayfield; except where indicated

1. "It's All Right" - 2:49
2. "Gypsy Woman" - 2:20
3. "Grow Closer Together" - 2:12
4. "Little Young Lover" - 2:14
5. "You've Come Home" - 2:45
6. "Never Let Me Go" (Joseph Scott) - 2:30
7. "Minstrel and Queen (Queen Majesty)" - 2:22
8. "I Need Your Love" (Richard Brooks) - 2:25
9. "I'm the One Who Loves You" - 2:28
10. "Sad, Sad Girl and Boy" - 2:40
11. "As Long as You Love Me" - 2:27
12. "Twist and Limbo" - 2:29

The original pressing of the album did not include "It's Alright" and instead included "Can't You See" as track 6. This was also included as the B-side of "Grow Closer Together", and received a CD release first on the 1994 Japanese reissue of the album, and internationally on the ABC Rarities compilation in 1999.

== Personnel ==
The Impressions

- Curtis Mayfield – lead vocals, guitar
- Fred Cash – backing vocals
- Sam Gooden – backing vocals
- Arthur Brooks – backing vocals
- Richard Brooks – backing vocals
- The Wrecking Crew – instrumentation

== Charts ==
USA - Album

Year	Chart	Peak position
1964	Pop Albums	43

USA - Singles

Year	Song	Chart	Peak position
1962	"Gypsy Woman"	Pop Singles	20
1962	"Grow Closer Together"	Pop Singles	99
1962	"Little Young Lover"	Pop Singles	96
1963	"It's All Right"	Pop Singles	4
1963	"I'm the One Who Loves You"	Pop Singles	73
1963	"Sad, Sad Girl and Boy"	Pop Singles	84
