= Take It to the Streets (Curtis Mayfield album) =

Studio album by Curtis Mayfield
- Released: 1990
- Recorded: December 1989–April 1990
- Genres: Funk, soul
- Length: 37:39
- Label: Curtom
- Producer: Curtis Mayfield

Curtis Mayfield chronology
People Get Ready: Live at Ronnie Scott's (1988)	Take It to the Streets (1990)	New World Order (1996)

Take It to the Streets is an album by the American musician Curtis Mayfield, released in 1990 on Curtom Records. "He's a Fly Guy" first appeared on the soundtrack to I'm Gonna Git You Sucka. The album peaked at No. 59 on Billboard's Top R&B Albums chart.

== Critical reception ==
Professional ratings
Review scores
Source	Rating
AllMusic	3/5 stars
Chicago Tribune	3/4 stars
The Encyclopedia of Popular Music	4/5 stars
(The New) Rolling Stone Album Guide	3/5 stars

The Chicago Tribune deemed the album "a solid return from one of Chicago's most distinguished musical sons."

== Track listing ==
All tracks are written by Curtis Mayfield, except "Got to Be Real" and "Don't Push" by Michael Brown and Tony Brown.

No.	Title	Length
1.	"Homeless"	7:31
2.	"Got to Be Real"	4:44
3.	"Do Be Down"	4:07
4.	"Who Was That Lady?"	4:55
5.	"On and On"	3:41
6.	"He's a Fly Guy"	4:54
7.	"Don't Push"	4:23
8.	"I Mo Git U Sucka"	4:59

== Personnel ==
- Curtis Mayfield – guitar, keyboards, arrangements, orchestration, final mix, vocals
- Gary Thompson, Tony Brown – guitar
- Lebron Scott – bass guitar
- Michael Brown – keyboards
- Carlos Glover – drum programming
- Luis Stefanell – percussion
- The True Saints – backing vocals
- Angela King – backing vocals

Technical

- Curtis Mayfield, Nina Easton – cover concept and design
- Andrew Wilson – photography
