= We Come in Peace with a Message of Love =

Studio album by Curtis Mayfield
- Released: 1985
- Recorded: May–July 1984
- Studio: Curtom, Atlanta, Georgia
- Genre: Funk, soul
- Length: 37:51
- Producer: Curtis Mayfield, Norman Harris, Ron Tyson

Curtis Mayfield chronology
Honesty (1982)	We Come in Peace with a Message of Love (1985)	Live in Europe (1988)

Professional ratings
Review scores
Source	Rating
AllMusic	2.5/5 stars
The Encyclopedia of Popular Music	3/5 stars
(The New) Rolling Stone Album Guide	2.5/5 stars

We Come in Peace with a Message of Love is an album by the American musician Curtis Mayfield, released 1985. The first single was "Baby It's You". Mayfield recorded a new version of "We Got to Have Peace".

== Track listing ==
All songs written by Curtis Mayfield, except where noted.

No.	Title	Writer(s)	Producer(s)	Length
1.	"We Come in Peace"		^{Mayfield}	8:30
2.	"Baby It's You"	Mayfield, Benny Scott, Edward Gregory, Joseph Scott	^{Mayfield}	5:48
3.	"Bodyguard"	Norman Harris, Ron Tyson	^{Mayfield}	4:41
4.	"Breakin' in the Streets"		^{Mayfield}	5:38
5.	"Everybody Needs a Friend"		^{Mayfield}	4:51
6.	"This Love is True"		^{Mayfield}	3:25
7.	"We Got to Have Peace"		^{Mayfield}	4:40

== Personnel ==
- Curtis Mayfield - vocals, guitar, Linn drum sequencing
- Edward Gregory, Joseph "Lucky" Scott, Bobby Eli, Norman Harris - guitar
- Tracy Mayfield, Joseph "Lucky" Scott, Jimmy Williams - bass
- William Green, Carlton Kent, Eugene Curry, Buzz Amaro - keyboards
- Theodis Rodgers - piano, Prophet V synthesizer
- Earl Young, Morris Jennings - drums
- Glen "Bongo" Davis, Master Henry Gibson - congas
- Hank Ford - saxophone
- Nella Rigell-Colson - harp
