= Keep On Pushing (song) =

Single by The Impressions

from the album Keep On Pushing
- B-side: "I Love You (Yeah)"
- Released: 1964
- Recorded: 1964
- Genre: Progressive soul; gospel
- Length: 2:30
- Label: ABC-Paramount
- Songwriter: Curtis Mayfield
- Producer: Johnny Pate

The Impressions singles chronology
"I'm So Proud" (1964)	"Keep On Pushing" (1964)	"You Must Believe Me" (1964)

"Keep On Pushing" is a 1964 single by The Impressions and was the title track of the album of the same name. The song was written by Curtis Mayfield. Originally written as a gospel song, Mayfield only changed one line, substituting "I've got my strength" for "God gave me strength."

In June 2026, CBS News included the song in its list of the 250 essential American songs of the past 250 years.

== Chart history ==
The single became the group's sixth Top 40 single, peaking at number ten. It went to number one for two weeks on the Cash Box R&B chart.

Chart (1964)	Peak position
U.S. Billboard Hot 100	10

== Use in presidential campaigns ==
- Decades later, the song was used as the theme to the 2004 Democratic National Convention keynote address by then-Illinois State Senator Barack Obama, who endorsed U.S. Senator John Kerry for President.
- It was frequently played at rallies in the early days of the 2020 presidential campaign of Joe Biden.

== Samples ==
- It was sampled in the 2005 song "Pushin'" by Bun B featuring Scarface and Young Jeezy, off the album Trill.

== See also ==
- Civil rights movement in popular culture
