= It's All Right (The Impressions song) =

Single by The Impressions

from the album The Impressions
- B-side: "You'll Want Me Back"
- Released: October 1963
- Genre: Soul; pop
- Length: 2:48
- Label: ABC-Paramount
- Songwriter: Curtis Mayfield

The Impressions singles chronology
| "Sad, Sad Girl and Boy" (1963) | "It's All Right" (1963) | "Talking About My Baby" (1964) |

"It's All Right" is a 1963 song recorded by The Impressions and written by the group's lead singer, Curtis Mayfield. The single was the most successful chart entry of the group's career. "It's All Right" was one of two top-ten singles for the group on the Billboard Hot 100, and the first of six number ones on the Billboard R&B chart. It also reached No.1 on the Cash Box R&B chart.

== Chart history ==
| Chart (1963) | Peak position |
|---|---|
| New Zealand (Lever Hit Parade) | 1 |
| US Billboard Hot 100 | 4 |
| US Billboard Hot R&B Sides | 1 |

== Cover versions ==
- In 1985, Huey Lewis and the News released a live version of "It's All Right", on "The Power of Love" single. In 1993, they recorded a studio a cappella version for People Get Ready – A Tribute to Curtis Mayfield.
- In 1993, Bruce Springsteen covered it on the final eight shows of the Bruce Springsteen 1992–1993 World Tour, typically as the closing number. A version featuring Southside Johnny and Steven Van Zandt from June 24, 1993, was released as part of the Bruce Springsteen Archives.
- In 1994, Steve Winwood included "It's All Right" on A Tribute to Curtis Mayfield
- In 2006, Aaron Neville recorded it, reaching No.28 on the US Adult Contemporary chart.
- In 2020, Jon Batiste recorded two covers for the Pixar film Soul. The end credits version is also featured in the soundtrack while the second cover is a duet with Celeste which is not part of the soundtrack.
