= I'm So Proud (song) =

Single by The Impressions

from the album The Never Ending Impressions
- B-side: "I Made a Mistake"
- Released: 1964
- Recorded: 1963
- Genre: Soul
- Length: 2:48
- Label: ABC-Paramount
- Songwriter: Curtis Mayfield
- Producer: Johnny Pate

The Impressions singles chronology
"It's All Right" (1963)	"I'm So Proud" (1964)	"Keep On Pushing" (1964)

"I'm So Proud" is a song written by American singer-songwriter Curtis Mayfield and recorded by the Impressions in 1963 for the album The Never Ending Impressions. Released as a single in 1964, "I'm So Proud" peaked at number 14 on the Billboard Hot 100 Singles chart and number 16 on the Cash Box Top 100 Singles chart.

== Charts ==
Chart (1964)	Peak position
US Billboard Hot 100	14
US Cash Box Top 100	16

== Cover versions ==
R&B/Soul group, The Main Ingredient, covered "I'm So Proud" on their 1970 album, "Tasteful Soul".

Pat Kelly (musician), Jamaican rocksteady and reggae singer and sound engineer working with King Tubby, Bunny Lee and Scientist (musician),released a discomix rockers’ version of the tune “I’m So Proud,” on both the Burning Rockers and Chanan-Jah labels in 1978.

Deniece Williams covered "I'm So Proud" as the title track to her 1983 album, reaching number 28 on the Billboard Hot Black Singles chart. Phyl Garland of Stereo Review thought her version "displays Williams in a coolly assertive Sixties vein."
