= People Get Ready =

Song by The Impressions

Single by the Impressions

from the album People Get Ready
- B-side: "I've Been Trying"
- Released: 1965
- Recorded: 1964
- Studio: Universal Recording (Chicago)
- Genre: Chicago soul
- Length: 2:38
- Label: ABC-Paramount 10622
- Songwriter: Curtis Mayfield
- Producer: Johnny Pate

The Impressions singles chronology
"Amen" (1964)	"People Get Ready" (1965)	"Woman's Got Soul" (1965)

Official audio
- "People Get Ready" on YouTube

"People Get Ready" is a 1965 single by the Impressions, and the title track from the People Get Ready album. The single is the group's best-known hit, reaching number three on the Billboard R&B chart and number 14 on the Billboard Hot 100. The gospel-influenced track was a Curtis Mayfield composition that displayed the growing sense of social and political awareness in his writing.

In 2021, Rolling Stone named "People Get Ready" the 122nd greatest song of all time. The song was included in the Rock and Roll Hall of Fame's 500 Songs that Shaped Rock and Roll. "People Get Ready" was named as one of the Top 10 Best Songs of All Time by Mojo music magazine, and was inducted into the Grammy Hall of Fame in 1998. In 2015, the song was selected for preservation in the National Recording Registry due to its "cultural, historic, or artistic significance". Martin Luther King Jr. named the song the unofficial anthem of the Civil Rights Movement and often used the song to get people marching or to calm and comfort them.

Various artists have covered the song, including Bob Marley and the Wailers in 1965 and 1977, the Chambers Brothers in 1968, Bob Dylan in 1975, and Rod Stewart and Jeff Beck in 1985. Australian group Human Nature had a minor hit in Australia with their version in 1997.

== Composition ==
The gospel-influenced track was written and composed by Curtis Mayfield, who was displaying a growing sense of social and political awareness in his writing. Mayfield said,

That was taken from my church or from the upbringing of messages from the church. Like there's no hiding place and get on board, and images of that sort. I must have been in a very deep mood of that type of religious inspiration when I wrote that song.

The song is the first Impressions hit to feature Mayfield's guitar in the break.

"People Get Ready" is in a long tradition of Black American freedom songs that use train imagery, such as "Wade in the Water", "The Gospel Train", and "Swing Low, Sweet Chariot". The idea comes from the spiritualist idea that once one dies the soul goes in a journey to the afterlife.

== Reception and legacy ==
The single reached number 3 on the Billboard R&B Chart and number 14 on the Billboard Pop Chart.

Rolling Stone magazine named "People Get Ready" the 24th greatest song of all time and also placed it at number 20 on their list of the 100 Greatest Guitar Tracks. The song was included in the Rock and Roll Hall of Fame's 500 Songs that Shaped Rock and Roll. The song was inducted into the Grammy Hall of Fame in 1998, and selected as one of the ten best songs of all time by a panel of 20 songwriters, including Paul McCartney, Brian Wilson, Hal David, for Britain's Mojo music magazine in 2000.

== Cover versions ==
The song became a classic that has influenced a wide range of artists from country singers through British, American and Australian pop and rock artists to reggae star Bob Marley who recorded an interpretation of "People Get Ready" as "One Love/People Get Ready" in 1965 and again in 1977. Others who have recorded the song include the Blind Boys of Alabama, Paul Jackson Jr., Al Green, Aretha Franklin (album Lady Soul from 1968), Eva Cassidy, Everly Brothers, the Chambers Brothers, The Persuasions and the Staple Singers.

- Bob Dylan recorded it twice; first in 1967 during the sessions that later became The Basement Tapes, and again in 1989 for the soundtrack to Flashback. A live version by Dylan was included in his 1978 film Renaldo and Clara and on his 14-CD box set, Bob Dylan – The Rolling Thunder Revue: The 1975 Live Recordings.
- A cover by Jeff Beck and Rod Stewart appeared on Beck's 1985 album Flash. The song peaked in the US at number 5 on Billboard Mainstream Rock Songs, number 48 on the Hot 100 and number 23 in Australia.
- Human Nature released the song as the fifth single from their Telling Everybody album in 1997. It reached number 35 on the Australian chart.
