= Gypsy Woman (The Impressions song) =

1961 song performed by The Impressions

- Side A of the original US single

Single by The Impressions

from the album The Impressions
- B-side: "As Long as You Love Me"
- Released: October 1961
- Studio: Universal Recording (Chicago)
- Genre: Rhythm and blues; Latin soul; doo-wop
- Length: 2:20
- Label: ABC-Paramount
- Songwriter: Curtis Mayfield

The Impressions singles chronology
"For Your Precious Love" (1958)	"Gypsy Woman" (1961)	"Grow Closer Together" (1962)

"Gypsy Woman" is a 1961 rhythm and blues song written by Curtis Mayfield and recorded by his group the Impressions. The group's first single following the departure of lead singer Jerry Butler, it reached No. 2 on the US Billboard R&B chart, No. 20 on the Billboard Hot 100 and number 17 on the Cash Box chart. It also appeared on the group's 1963 eponymous debut album. Joe Bataan (1967), Brian Hyland (1970), Bobby Womack (1985), Steve Marriott (1989), and Santana (1990) covered this song.

According to a 1995 British interview, Mayfield wrote "Gypsy Woman" when he was 12 years old.

== Brian Hyland version ==
"Gypsy Woman"
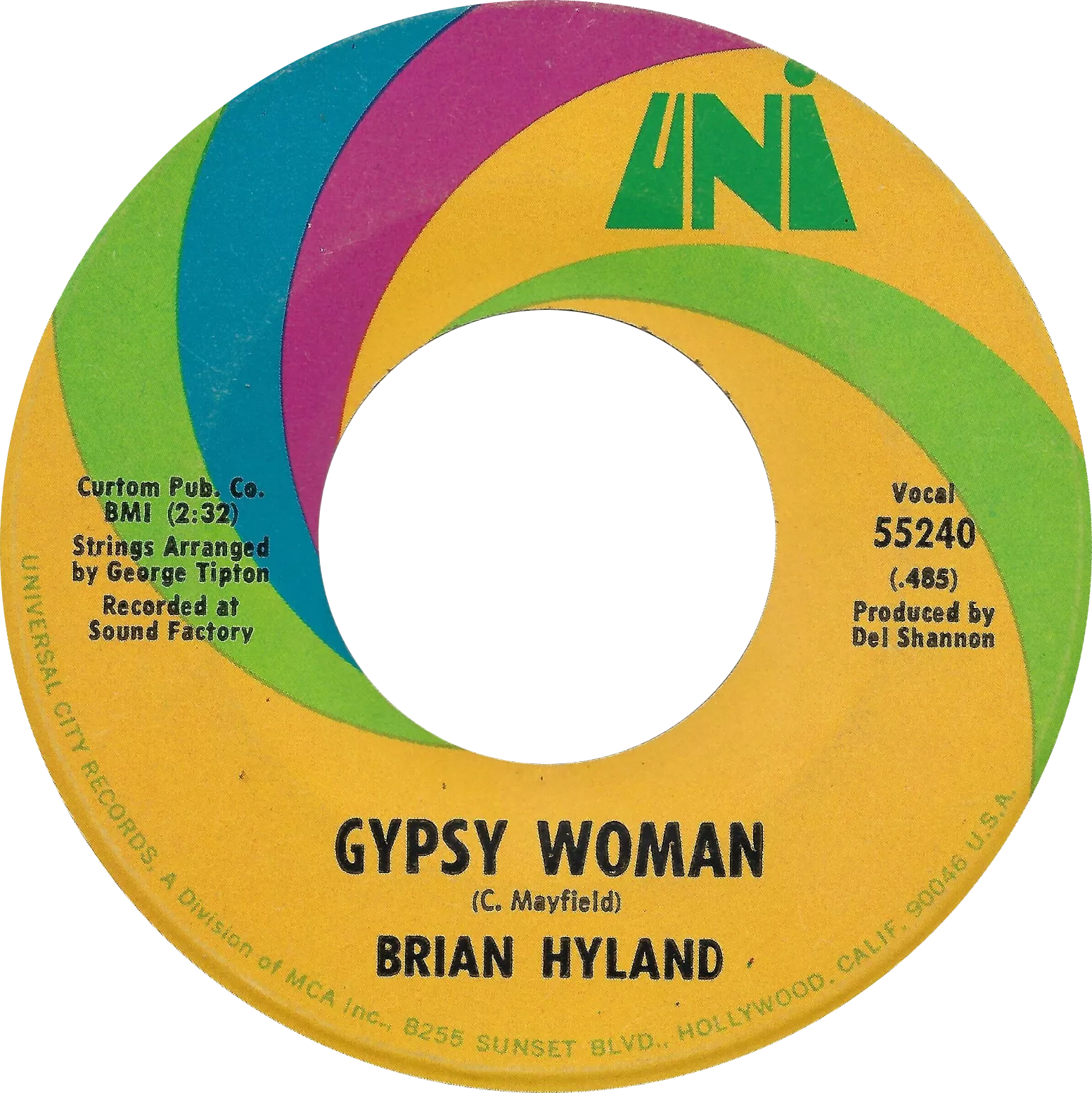
- One of side-A labels of the US single

Single by Brian Hyland

from the album Brian Hyland
- B-side: "You and Me (#2)"
- Released: June 10, 1970
- Length: 2:32
- Label: Uni
- Songwriter: Curtis Mayfield
- Producer: Del Shannon

Brian Hyland singles chronology
"Stay and Love Me All Summer" (1969)	"Gypsy Woman" (1970)	"Lonely Teardrops" (1971)

In 1970, Brian Hyland recorded his version of the song, produced by Del Shannon and featuring Max Crook on keyboards which went up to Number 3 on the U.S. Billboard Hot 100 and in Canada, and number 4 in South Africa.

Hyland's version became a gold record. In that same year 1970, Major Lance also recorded the song.

== Santana version ==
Santana covered "Gypsy Woman" in 1990, from the album Spirits Dancing in the Flesh. It was released as a single and charted on both Adult Contemporary charts of the US and Canada, at numbers 31 and 29 respectively.

== Charts ==
=== The Impressions ===
Chart (1961–1962)	Peak position
US Billboard Hot 100	20
US Billboard R&B	2
US Cash Box Top 100	17

=== Brian Hyland ===
==== Weekly charts ====
Chart (1970–1971)	Peak position
Australian Singles (Kent Music Report)	9
Belgium (Ultratop 50 Flanders)	27
Canada Top Singles (RPM)	3
Italian Singles (Musica e dischi)	61
Netherlands (Dutch Top 40)	27
Netherlands (Single Top 100)	27
South Africa (Springbok)	4
UK Singles (Official Charts)	42
US Billboard Hot 100	3
US Cash Box Top 100	3
West Germany (GfK)	34

==== Year-end charts ====
Chart (1970)	Peak position
Canada Top Singles (RPM)	46
US (Joel Whitburn's Pop Annual)	34

=== Santana ===
Chart (1990)	Peak position
Canada Top Singles (RPM)	40
Canada Adult Contemporary (RPM)	29
US Adult Contemporary (Billboard)	31
