= The Impressions =

American soul vocal group (1958–2018)

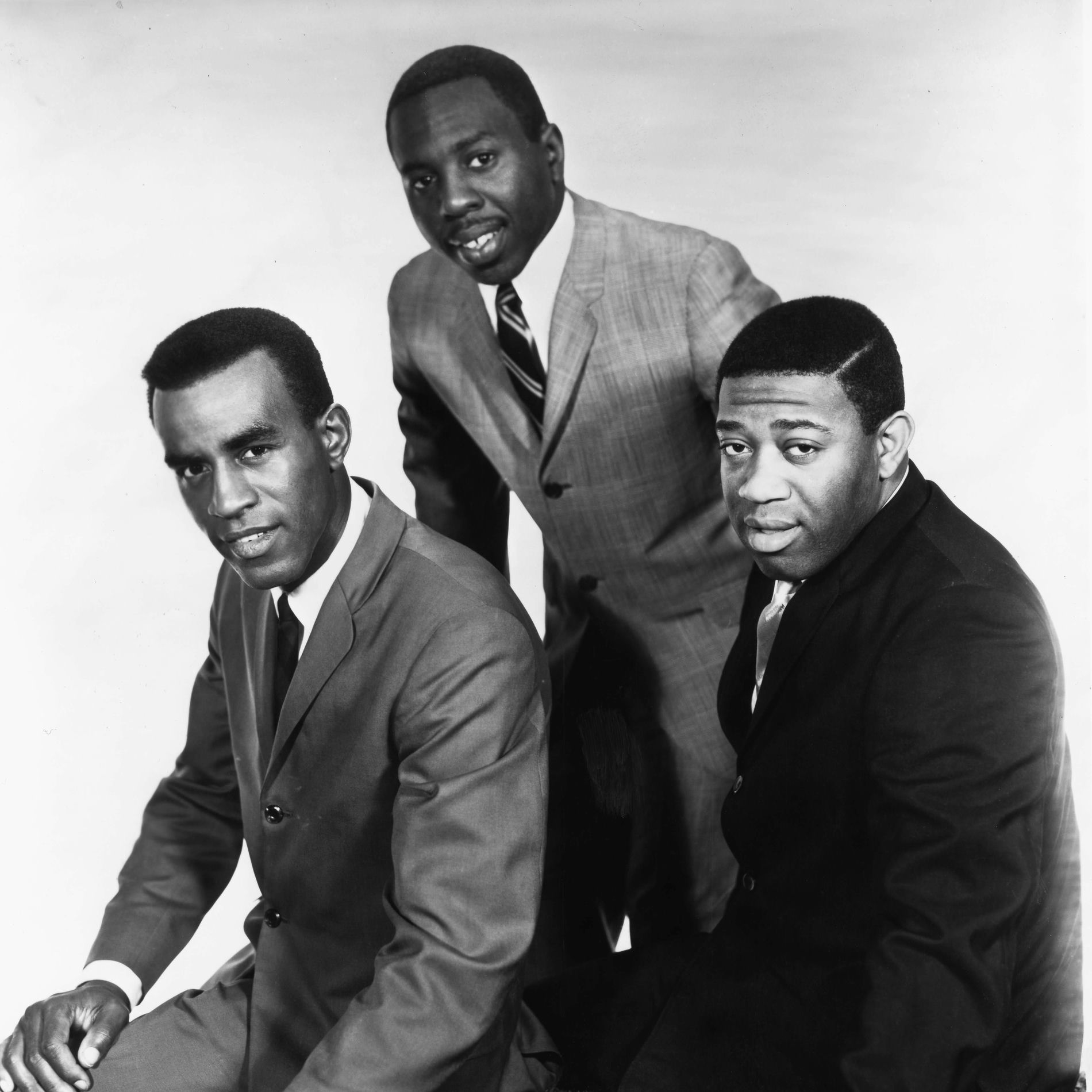
- The Impressions in 1964, from left to right: Sam Gooden, Curtis Mayfield, and Fred Cash

Background information
- Origin: Chicago, Illinois, United States
- Genres: R&B, doo-wop, Chicago soul, soul, gospel
- Works: The Impressions discography
- Years active: 1958–2018
- Labels: ABC-Paramount, His Master's Voice, Vee-Jay, Curtom, Universal, RSO
- Past members: Fred Cash; Sam Gooden; Jerry Butler; Curtis Mayfield; Nate Evans; Arthur Brooks; Richard Brooks; Leroy Hutson; Ralph Johnson; Vandy “Smokey” Hampton; Willie Kitchens; Reggie Torian; Jermaine Purifory

The Impressions were an American music group originally formed in 1958. Their repertoire includes gospel, R&B, doo-wop, and soul.

The group was founded as the Roosters by Chattanooga, Tennessee natives Sam Gooden, Richard Brooks and Arthur Brooks, who moved to Chicago and added Jerry Butler and Curtis Mayfield to their line-up to become Jerry Butler & the Impressions. By 1962, Butler and the Brookses had departed, and after switching to ABC-Paramount Records, Mayfield, Gooden, and returning original Impressions' member Fred Cash collectively became a top-selling soul act. Mayfield left the group for a solo career in 1970; Leroy Hutson, Ralph Johnson, Reggie Torian (born Reginald Torian), and Nate Evans (Twinight Records) were among the replacements who joined Gooden and Cash.

Inductees into both the Rock and Roll Hall of Fame and the Vocal Group Hall of Fame, the Impressions had a string of hits in the 1960s, many of which were heavily influenced by gospel music and served as inspirational anthems for the Civil Rights Movement. They are also 1998 Grammy Hall of Fame inductees for their hit "People Get Ready", and winners of the Rhythm and Blues Foundation's Pioneer Award (in 2000). The group's long career spanned over 60 years at the time of their retirement in 2018.

== History ==
=== Early years ===
Jerry Butler and Curtis Mayfield met while singing in the same Chicago church choir. After singing in a number of local gospel groups, the two of them joined a doo-wop group called the Roosters in 1957, whose members included Chattanooga, Tennessee natives Sam Gooden, Richard Brooks, and his brother Arthur Brooks. By 1958, the Roosters had a new manager in Eddie Thomas, a record deal with Vee-Jay Records, and a new name: Jerry Butler & the Impressions.

The group's first hit single was 1958's "For Your Precious Love", which hit No. 11 on the US pop chart and No. 3 on the R&B chart. However, soon after the release of the R&B Top 30 hit "Come Back My Love", Butler left the group to go on to a successful solo career. After briefly touring as the guitarist with the now-solo Butler, Curtis Mayfield became the group's new lead singer and songwriter, and Fred Cash, a returning original Roosters member, was appointed the new fifth member.

=== ABC-Paramount Records success ===
Mayfield wrote several of Butler's early solo hits, and used the money to get the Impressions to move to New York City. There, they got a new deal with ABC-Paramount Records in 1961, and released their first post-Butler single. That single, "Gypsy Woman", was their biggest single to date, hitting No. 2 on the R&B chart and No. 20 on the pop chart. Successive singles failed to match "Gypsy Woman"′s success, and Richard and Arthur Brooks ended up leaving the group in 1962.

The Impressions returned to Chicago as a trio, and soon aligned themselves with producer Johnny Pate, who helped to update their sound and create a more lush soul sound for the group. The result was "It's All Right", a 1963 million-selling gold single that topped the R&B chart and made it to No. 4 on the pop chart, and became one of the group's signature songs. "It's All Right" and "Gypsy Woman" were the anchors of the Impressions' first LP, 1963's The Impressions.

1964 brought the first of Mayfield's Black pride anthem compositions, "Keep on Pushing", which became a top 10 smash on both the Billboard Pop and R&B chart, peaking at No. 10 Pop. It was the title cut from the album of the same name, which also reached the top 10 on both charts. Future Mayfield compositions featured an increasingly social and political awareness, including the following year's major hit and the group's best-known song, the gospel-influenced "People Get Ready", which hit No. 3 on the R&B chart and No. 14 on the pop chart.

=== Increasing social consciousness ===
In the mid-1960s, the Impressions were compared with Motown acts such as the Temptations, the Miracles, and the Four Tops. Their 1966 single "Can't Satisfy" was deemed to share significant similarities with "This Old Heart Of Mine (Is Weak For You)" by Motown group the Isley Brothers; Motown sued and Curtis Mayfield had to share writing credits with songwriting-production team Holland-Dozier-Holland and Sylvia Moy for his song. "Can't Satisfy" was nevertheless a top 20 R&B hit for the Impressions, peaking at No. 12, and has since become a Northern Soul classic. After 1965's "Woman's Got Soul", and the No. 7 pop hit "Amen", the Impressions failed to reach the R&B top ten for three more years, finally scoring in 1968 with the No. 9 "I Loved and Lost". "We're a Winner", which hit No. 1 on the R&B chart that same year, represented a new level of social awareness in Mayfield's music. Mayfield created his own label, Curtom, and moved the Impressions to the label. Over the next two years, more Impressions message tracks followed, including the No. 1 R&B hit "Choice of Colors" (1969) and the No. 3 R&B hit "Check Out Your Mind" (1970).

The Impressions were a notable influence on The Wailers and other ska/rocksteady groups and singers in Jamaica: the Wailers modelled their singing/harmony style on them and in part borrowed their look, too. There are many covers of Impressions songs by the Wailers, including "Keep On Moving", "Long Long Winter" and "Just Another Dance". Bob Marley also sampled the lyrics of the Impressions song "People, Get Ready" for his song "One Love/People Get Ready". The Wailers had recorded it on several occasions before it was released as a single in 1984. Original recordings of the song do not credit Mayfield's song and are simply titled "One Love" (as copyright law was not enforced for Jamaican recordings at the time) but the version for their album 1977 Exodus (and 1984 single) is titled "One Love/People Get Ready" and credits Mayfield, giving co-authorship credits to both Marley and Mayfield. In addition, Pat Kelly covered "Soulful Love" and The Heptones covered "I've Been Trying" and “Choice of Color”.

=== After Mayfield's departure ===
After the release of the Check Out Your Mind LP in 1970, Mayfield left the group and began a successful solo career, the highlight of which was writing and producing the Super Fly soundtrack, followed by collaborating on the soundtracks of Claudine, Sparkle, and A Piece of the Action. He continued to write and produce for the Impressions, who remained on Curtom. Leroy Hutson was the first new lead singer for the group following Mayfield's departure, but success eluded the Impressions, and Hutson left the group in 1973. Jon French was the drummer for the touring band playing around the United States and Europe. He is also heard on the recording of "Freddie's Dead".

=== Later years, awards, and accolades ===
New members Ralph Johnson and Reggie Torian replaced Hutson, and the Impressions had three R&B top 5 singles in 1974–1975: the No. 1 "Finally Got Myself Together (I'm a Changed Man)" (which also reached the Pop top 20) and the No. 3 singles "Same Thing it Took" and "Sooner or Later". In 1975, the Impressions had their sole British hit, when "First Impressions" reached No. 16 on the UK Singles Chart. In 1976, the Impressions left Curtom and Mayfield behind for Cotillion Records and had their final major hit with "Loving Power". The same year, Ralph Johnson was replaced by Nate Evans, who remained in the group for three years, during which time the Impressions switched to 20th Century Records. Singles and albums sales continued to slip, and Evans left in 1979, reducing the group to a trio. Evans temporarily rejoined for the album Fan the Fire, released in 1981.

Reggie Torian left in 1983. Ralph Johnson rejoined that year, as well as new member Vandy Hampton. This lineup recorded with Eric Clapton on his Reptile album.

The Impressions were inducted into the Rock and Roll Hall of Fame in 1991 and into the Vocal Group Hall of Fame in 2003. The members who became Rock and Roll Hall of Fame inductees were the original Roosters/Impressions lineup: Sam Gooden, Jerry Butler, Richard Brooks, Curtis Mayfield, Arthur Brooks, and Fred Cash.

Mayfield was paralyzed from the neck down, after lighting equipment fell on him during a live performance at Wingate Field in Flatbush, Brooklyn, New York, on August 13, 1990. Despite this, he continued his career as a recording artist, releasing his final album New World Order in 1997. Mayfield won a Grammy Legend Award in 1994 and a Grammy Lifetime Achievement Award in 1995 and was a double inductee into the Rock and Roll Hall of Fame, as a member of the Impressions in 1991 and again in 1999 as a solo artist. He was also a two-time Grammy Hall of Fame inductee. He died from complications of type 2 diabetes in 1999 at the age of 57.

Johnson left in 2001 and was replaced by Willie Kitchens. This lineup was featured on the PBS specials R&B 40 and Soul and Inspiration. Hampton was released in 2003 and died in 2005. Reggie Torian later returned, replacing Kitchens. The Impressions recorded a tribute album to Curtis Mayfield in 2000, which was released by Edel America. In 2008 Universal Music & Hip O Records released Movin' On Up – the first-ever video compilation of the Impressions, featuring brand-new interviews with original Impressions members Sam Gooden and Fred Cash, along with taped interviews with the now-late Curtis Mayfield and video performances of the group's greatest hits and several of Mayfield's solo hits. The group's first million-selling hit song "For Your Precious Love", featuring original lead singer Jerry Butler on lead, is ranked No. 327, and their hit "People Get Ready" is ranked No. 24, on the Rolling Stone magazine's list of Rolling Stone's 500 Greatest Songs of All Time. Also, the Impressions' album/CD The Anthology 1961–1977 is ranked at No. 179 on Rolling Stone magazine's list of The 500 Greatest Albums of All Time.

"People Get Ready" has also been chosen as one of the Top 10 Best Songs of All Time by a panel of 20 top industry songwriters and producers, including Paul McCartney, Brian Wilson, Hal David, and others, as reported to Britain's Mojo music magazine.

=== Re-emergence ===
In 2011, the Impressions began a collaboration with German-born DJ Pari of the Soulpower organization, who managed their career until their retirement in 2018. They embarked to England for their first ever public performances at Barbican Centre in London and Bridgewater Hall in Manchester, followed by a trip to Madrid, Spain, in 2012. In July 2012, they performed at the official Curtis Mayfield 70th Birthday Tribute Concert at Avery Fisher Hall in New York City. In July 2013, the Impressions released "Rhythm!", their first single in over thirty years, on Daptone Records. The 7" record featured original members Fred Cash, Sam Gooden, and Reggie Torian and was produced by Binky Griptite, guitarist for the Dap-Kings. "Rhythm!" was originally penned by Curtis Mayfield in the mid-sixties (and recorded by Major Lance). The B-side, "Star Bright," was written by Binky Griptite.

In August 2013, former Impressions member Leroy Hutson filed a complaint against Young Jeezy and others alleging that Young Jeezy's song "Time" inappropriately incorporated the instrumental portion of the Impressions "Getting it On", which was registered with the United States Copyright Office in 1973.

In 2015, then 30-year old Jermaine Purifory, an American Idol contestant and former session-vocalist for the musical comedy-drama Glee, joined the Impressions as their new lead singer. Purifory performed with the group until their retirement in 2018.

In September 2018, the Impressions embarked on their first Japan tour, which was also their farewell tour in their 60th-anniversary year. The Impressions performed six shows at the Billboard Live venues in Tokyo and Osaka.

== Deaths ==
Curtis Mayfield died of diabetic complications on December 26, 1999, at the age of 57.

Vandy "Smokey" Hampton died in East Chicago, Indiana on February 22, 2005, at the age of 55.

Arthur Brooks died on November 22, 2015, at the age of 82.

Reggie Torian died of a heart attack on May 4, 2016, at the age of 65.

Ralph Johnson was born on October 6, 1949, in Greenville, South Carolina, and died in Piedmont, South Carolina on December 4, 2016, at the age of 67.

Sam Gooden died in Chattanooga, Tennessee, on August 4, 2022, at the age of 87.

Richard Brooks died in Chattanooga, Tennessee, on November 12, 2023, at the age of 83.

Jerry Butler, the last surviving original member, died from complications of Parkinson's disease on February 20, 2025, at the age of 85.

== Personnel ==
Members

- Jerry Butler (1958–1960; died 2025)
- Curtis Mayfield (1958–1970; died 1999)
- Sam Gooden (1958–2018; died 2022)
- Arthur Brooks (1958–1962, died 2015)
- Richard Brooks (1958–1962; died 2023)
- Fred Cash (1960–2018)
- Leroy Hutson (1970–1973)
- Ralph Johnson (1973–1976; 1983–2001; 2003; died 2016)
- Vandy "Smokey" Hampton (1983–2003, died 2005)
- Nate Evans (1976–1979)
- Reggie Torian (1973–1983, 2003-2015; died 2016)
- Willie Kitchens (2001–2003)
- Jermaine Purifory (2015–2018)

Group Lineup

1958-1960	1960-1962	1960-1970
Jerry Butler - lead/baritone; Curtis Mayfield - tenor/guitar; Sam Gooden - bass; Richard Brooks - 1st tenor; Arthur Brooks - 2nd tenor	Curtis Mayfield - lead tenor and guitar; Fred Cash - tenor/baritone; Sam Gooden - bass; Richard Brooks - 1st tenor; Arthur Brooks - 2nd tenor	Curtis Mayfield - lead tenor and guitar; Fred Cash - baritone/2nd tenor; Sam Gooden - bass
1970-1973	1973-1976	1976-1979
Leroy Huston - lead; Fred Cash - tenor/baritone; Sam Gooden - bass	Ralph Johnson - lead; Fred Cash - 1st tenor/baritone; Sam Gooden - bass; Reggie Torian - 2nd tenor	Nate Evans - lead; Fred Cash - 1st tenor/baritone; Sam Gooden - bass; Reggie Torian - 2nd tenor
1979-1983 2003-2015	1983-2001	2001-Early 2003
Reggie Torian - lead/2nd tenor; Fred Cash - baritone/1st tenor; Sam Gooden - bass	Ralph Johnson - lead tenor; Fred Cash - baritone/1st tenor; Sam Gooden - bass; Vandy “Smokey” Hampton - 2nd tenor	Willie Kitchens - lead tenor; Fred Cash - baritone/1st tenor; Sam Gooden - bass; Vandy “Smokey” Hampton - 2nd tenor
Early-Mid 2003	Mid-Late 2003	2015-2018
Willie Kitchens - lead tenor; Fred Cash - baritone/1st tenor; Sam Gooden - bass	Ralph Johnson - lead tenor; Fred Cash - baritone/1st tenor; Sam Gooden - bass	Jermaine Purifory - lead tenor; Fred Cash - baritone/1st tenor; Sam Gooden - bass

== Discography ==
- 1963: The Impressions
- 1964: The Never Ending Impressions
- 1964: Keep On Pushing
- 1965: People Get Ready
- 1965: One by One
- 1965: Big Sixteen
- 1966: Ridin' High
- 1967: The Fabulous Impressions
- 1968: We're a Winner
- 1968: This Is My Country
- 1969: The Versatile Impressions
- 1969: The Young Mods' Forgotten Story
- 1970: Check Out Your Mind!
- 1971: 16 Greatest Hits!
- 1972: Times Have Changed
- 1973: Preacher Man
- 1974: Finally Got Myself Together
- 1974: Three the Hard Way
- 1975: First Impressions
- 1976: Loving Power
- 1976: It's About Time
- 1979: Come to My Party
- 1981: Fan the Fire
