= Sam Gooden =

American soul singer (1934–2022)

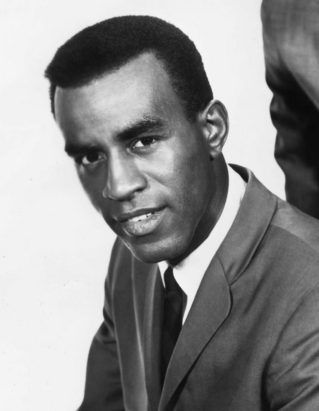
- Sam Gooden in 1964

Background information
- Born: Samuel Gooden; September 2, 1934; Chattanooga, Tennessee, U.S.
- Died: August 4, 2022 (aged 87) Chattanooga, Tennessee, U.S.
- Occupation: Singer
- Years active: 1958–2018
- Formerly of: The Impressions

Samuel Gooden (September 2, 1934 – August 4, 2022) was an American soul singer. He was best known for being an original member of the successful 1991 Rock and Roll Hall of Fame-inducted R&B group The Impressions, from its beginnings as The Roosters in the 1950s.

Though often uncredited, his smooth voice can often be heard trading lines with lead singer Curtis Mayfield (most notably on "It's All Right") or his replacement, Leroy Hutson, on quite a number of songs. Gooden also sang lead vocals on a handful of Impressions tunes, such as "Aware Of Love" and the group's cover of "I Wanna Be Around". His distinctive bass vocals can also be heard on the group's Top 20 smashes "Gypsy Woman", "Talking About My Baby", and People Get Ready, along with their chart hit, "I Been Trying", (later covered by Eric Clapton). Gooden and the group recorded and performed until his death in 2022. He was inducted with the group in 1991 into the Rock and Roll Hall of Fame.

Gooden original member and founder can be seen with Impressions members Fred Cash and Curtis Mayfield (via archive footage) in the group's first-ever extended interview in the 2008 DVD Movin On Up – The Message and The Music of Curtis Mayfield & The Impressions, which also features a special poem dedicated to the group written and performed by actor Clifton Davis.

Gooden died of a heart attack in Chattanooga, Tennessee, on August 4, 2022, at the age of 87, as was reported by his wife.
