= Chicago soul =

Music genre

- Stylistic origins: Soul; rhythm and blues; gospel; doo-wop; blues
- Cultural origins: Early 1960s, Chicago, Illinois, United States

Regional scenes
- Chicago

Other topics
- Motown - Northern soul

Chicago soul is a style of soul music that arose during the 1960s in Chicago. Along with Detroit, the home of Motown, and Memphis, with its hard-edged, gritty performers (see Memphis soul), Chicago and the Chicago soul style helped spur the album-oriented soul revolution of the early 1970s.

The sound of Chicago soul, like southern soul with its rich influence of black gospel music, also exhibited an unmistakable gospel sound, but was somewhat lighter and more delicate in its approach. Chicago vocal groups tended to feature laid-back sweet harmonies, while solo artists exhibited a highly melodic and somewhat pop approach to their songs.

Accompaniment usually featured highly orchestrated arrangements, with horns and strings, by such notable arrangers as Johnny Pate (who largely worked with horns) and Riley Hampton (who specialized in strings). This kind of soul music is sometimes called "soft soul", to distinguish it from the more harsh and gospel-like "hard soul" style.

== Notable labels ==
A variety of labels in the city during the 1960s and 1970s contributed to the Chicago soul sound, most notably Vee-Jay, Constellation Records, Chess Records, Mercury Records, OKeh, ABC-Paramount, One-derful, Brunswick and its Dakar Records subsidiary, and Curtis Mayfield's Curtom label.

=== Vee-Jay ===
Vee-Jay Records was Chicago's pioneer soul label. In 1958 it produced the first recognized soul hit in Chicago, Jerry Butler and The Impressions' "For Your Precious Love." The company, before it went bankrupt in 1966, produced under A&R director Calvin Carter, many notable soul acts in the Chicago soft soul idiom, notably Butler (best known for "He Will Break Your Heart"), Betty Everett ("The Shoop Shoop Song (It's in His Kiss)"), Dee Clark ("Raindrops"), and Gene Chandler ("Duke of Earl"). Vee Jay was also the first American record label to sign and record The Beatles in the U.S in 1962. The label released several singles but were unsuccessful in scoring a major hit. In 1964 Vee-Jay released The Beatles' first U.S. album titled Introducing... The Beatles. After having management issues at the label and a shortage of funds, the label could not promote the record and give it the push that was needed. So the label was forced to release the group.

=== Chess ===
Chess Records, under A&R director and producer Roquel Billy Davis, featured such Chicago soul style acts as the vocal harmony groups The Dells ("Stay in My Corner") and the Radiants ("Voice Your Choice"), female singers Jan Bradley ("Mama Didn't Lie"), Fontella Bass ("Rescue Me"), and Jackie Ross ("Selfish One"), and male vocalists such as Bo Diddley's protégé Billy Stewart ("I Do Love You"). Chess' biggest female soul artist, Etta James, performed both in the soft style ("At Last") and the hard style ("Tell Mama").

=== OKeh ===
OKeh Records was a subsidiary of Columbia Records, but it produced a number of hits by Chicago artists, produced by A&R director Carl Davis in the company's Chicago office. Most of the songs performed by OKeh artists came from the pen of Curtis Mayfield, and OKeh recordings best typified the distinctive sound of Chicago soul. Best known Chicago artists on OKeh were Major Lance ("The Monkey Time" ), Walter Jackson ("It's All Over"), Billy Butler ("Right Track"), and the Artistics ("Get My Hands on Some Lovin'").

=== Brunswick ===
Brunswick Records is a New York-based label, but under the aegis of producer and A&R man Carl Davis in Chicago, the company produced a large body of Chicago style soul, beginning in 1966, when Jackie Wilson started recording in Chicago. Wilson's biggest hit with Davis was "(Your Love Keeps Lifting Me) Higher and Higher." Other Brunswick artists included The Chi-Lites ("Oh Girl"), The Artistics ("I'm Gonna Miss You"), Barbara Acklin ("Love Makes A Woman"), Tyrone Davis ("Turn Back the Hands of Time"), and Gene Chandler ("The Girl Don't Care"). Brunswick was eventually acquired by Carl Davis, and the offices moved to the Record Row (South Michigan Avenue).

=== Chi-Sound ===
Another label active in Chicago in the mid-to-late 1970s was Chi-Sound Records, under the production aegis of Carl Davis. Chi-Sound, besides recording the Chi-Lites, Dells, and Gene Chandler, had a number of disco-soul acts between 1976 and 1982, including Windy City, Magnum Force, Sidney Joe Qualls (previously signed to the Brunswick Records subsidiary, Dakar, in the early 1970s), Ebony Rhythm Funk Campaign and Manchild.

=== ABC-Paramount ===
ABC-Paramount was based in New York, but it recorded a number of Chicago soul acts through its Chicago offices, most notably The Impressions, led by guitarist and songwriter Curtis Mayfield. The Impressions were best known for such hits as "Gypsy Woman" and "People Get Ready." Another Chicago soul act that recorded for ABC-Paramount was The Marvelows ("I Do").

=== Mercury ===
In Chicago, Mercury Records was formed by Irving Green, Berle Adams, Arthur Talmadge and Ray Greenberg in 1945. The label released soul, R&B, doo-wop, blues, jazz, and pop music. From the 1950s to the 1980s, Mercury released records of musicians such as Jerry Butler, Phil Philips, the Platters, Brook Benton, Ohio Players, the Bar-Kays, Con Funk Shun, Cameo, Kool and the Gang, Kurtis Blow, Heaven & Earth and the Gap Band.

=== One-derful ===
The One-derful label complex (One-derful, M-Pac, Mar-V-lus, Midas, Halo, Toddlin' Town) represented mostly the harder gospelly style of Chicago soul music. Its most notable artists were Otis Clay ("That's How It Is"), Harold Burrage ("Got to Find A Way"), McKinley Mitchell ("The Town I Live In"), and The Five Du-Tones ("Shake a Tail Feather"). The company also had dance hits with Alvin Cash and the Crawlers ("Twine Time"). The entire catalog has been purchased by Minneapolis-based Secret Stash Records.

=== Constellation ===
Constellation Records was formed in August 1963 by Ewart Abner, Bill "Bunky" Sheppard, and Art Sheridan. Abner was ousted from Vee-Jay, and took with him from Vee-Jay producer Bill "Bunky" Sheppard, and two Vee-Jay artists that were personally under contract to Abner, namely Gene Chandler and Dee Clark. Art Sheridan had run Chance Records in the early 1950s, and had been an investor in Vee-Jay. Chandler prospered at Constellation, getting huge national hits for the next three years, notably "Just Be True" and "Nothing Can Stop Me," while Dee Clark got only local hits, notably "Warm Summer Breezes" and "Heartbreak." Another Constellation artists were Lee Dorsey, Billy 'The Kid' Emerson and others.

=== Curtom ===
Curtom was owned by Curtis Mayfield, and the label began recording Chicago soul talent in 1968. The label better represents the post-soul era in Chicago black music, as it specialized in funk and disco recordings, and became a notable producer of soundtracks for black films. Mayfield became a solo artist while at Curtom, and his Super Fly soundtrack (1972), with its funk style, represents the label's biggest seller. Other Curtom artists were disco singer Linda Clifford ("Runaway Love"), the Natural Four ("Can This Be Real"), and the Staple Singers ("Let's Do It Again"). Predating Curtom, Mayfield ran the labels Windy C (Five Stairsteps, Holly Maxwell, June Conquest), and Mayfield (Fascinations, The Mayfield Singers) (which featured two future soul stars: Donny Hathaway and Leroy Hutson, and Holly Maxwell).

In 1980, Mayfield closed the Curtom office and moved to Atlanta, and not long afterwards Brunswick closed its office, which had by then moved to Chicago, as well. With these closings, and with disco and funk replacing traditional soul in popular appeal, Chicago soul music had effectively come to an end.

== Sources ==
- Pruter, Robert (1991). Chicago Soul. Urbana, IL: University of Illinois Press.
