= Fred Cash =

American soul singer (born 1940)

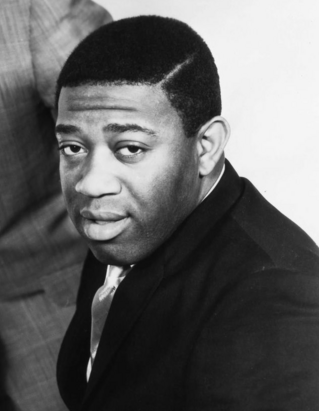
- Fred Cash in 1964

Background information
- Born: October 8, 1940 (age 85); Chattanooga, Tennessee, U.S.
- Origin: Chicago, Illinois, U.S.
- Occupation: Singer
- Instrument: Vocals
- Years active: 1958–2018
- Formerly of: The Impressions

Fred Cash (born October 8, 1940) is an American soul singer. He was a member of The Impressions, a group in which he replaced Jerry Butler in 1960. As one of the group's longest-serving members, he is also a 1991 inductee into the Rock and Roll Hall of Fame with The Impressions.

== Early life ==
Cash was born in Chattanooga, Tennessee, the third of four children. He came from a musical family; his mother played piano and his family sang at the Beulah Baptist Church in Chattanooga, where his father was a Deacon.

== Career ==
Cash sung with his neighbour, Sam Gooden, at church as a child. Cash and Gooden then sung in The Roosters, which eventually became The Impressions. Cash left the Roosters before they became the Impressions, due to his mother refusing to let him move to Chicago. After leaving the group for a time, he returned to the Impressions in 1960, replacing original member Jerry Butler.

He can be seen with original Impressions members Sam Gooden and Curtis Mayfield (via archive footage) in the group's first-ever extended interview in the 2008 DVD "Movin On Up- The Message and The Music of Curtis Mayfield & The Impressions".

In 2016 Cash along with The Impressions were inducted into the National Rhythm & Blues Hall of Fame. Cash continued to tour with the Impressions until the group was retired in 2018.

== Personal life ==
As of 2024, Cash was living in Chattanooga. With the deaths of Curtis Mayfield in 1999 and Sam Gooden in 2022, Cash is the last surviving member of the hitmaking lineup of The Impressions.
