= Curtom Records =

Defunct American record label co-founded by Curtis Mayfield

- Parent company: Warner Music Group
- Founded: 1968
- Founder: Curtis Mayfield; Eddie Thomas
- Defunct: 1980
- Distributors: Buddah; Warner Bros; RSO
- Genre: Soul music
- Country of origin: United States
- Location: Chicago

Curtom Records was a record label founded by Curtis Mayfield and Eddie Thomas in March 1968 as an independently distributed music label. It was located at 8541 South Stony Island Boulevard. The name of the label came from a hybrid of the names "Curtis" and "Thomas". Prior to Curtom, Mayfield had started two other labels: Windy C and Mayfield which both had closed down. The company's motto was "We're a Winner", taken from one the hit songs from Mayfield's group The Impressions released by ABC Records. At the inception, Mayfield was the company principal producer and A&R person. Other staff included Johnny Pate and Donny Hathaway. Pate left in 1972. Most of the artists on Curtom did not write their own music, which led to the studio’s producers such as Leroy Hutson, Lowrell Simon, Ed Townsend, Gil Askey, Marvin Yancy and Chuck Jackson writing music as well. The first release on Curtom was This Is My Country released in 1968.

Mayfield was not involved in the business aspects of the label, and instead had manager Marv Stuart focus on those matters. Stuart took over direction of the company from Eddie Thomas in 1970, and formally took charge in May 1971. Mayfield said he taught the music business to Stuart and that Stuart "through his own know-how and his own go-getting-ness, he learned. He was able to find weak spots in Curtom and he turned them around."

In June 1968, distribution of the label was assumed by the New York-based label Buddah Records. Curtom grew enough to take over RCA Studio in 1973. In 1975, Curtom moved to Warner Brothers for distribution. By 1976, the company had gross sales ranging between nine and ten million dollars, but did not survive past the end of the decade.

Robert Pruter, author of the book Chicago Soul stated that two factors led to the demise of Curtom in the late 1970s: the rise of disco and the collapse of the black film market. In 1976, the company felt prosperous enough to invest in the film Short Eyes. Pruter noted that by the late 1970s the label was "mostly releasing second-rate disco" and that the soundtrack to Short Eyes did poorly following the collapse of the black movies losing their audience. Curtom switched from Warner Brothers to RSO for distribution by 1979; at this time, the company was more of a logo and dropped most of its more famous acts. In 1980, Curtom was disbanded. At that point, the only artists attached to the label were Linda Clifford, Mayfield and Today, Tomorrow, Forever.

== See also ==
- List of record labels
