= Curtis Mayfield =

American singer-songwriter (1942–1999)

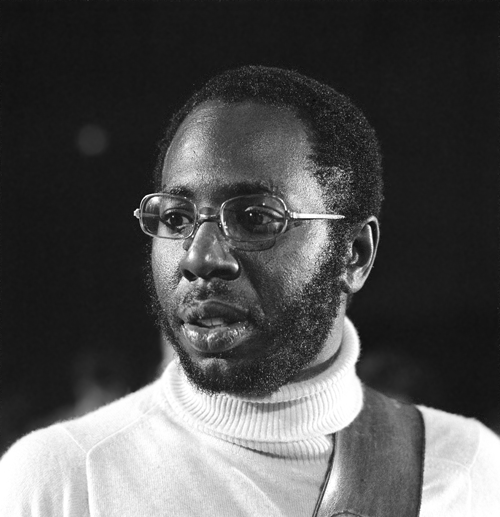
- Mayfield in 1972

Background information
- Born: Curtis Lee Mayfield; June 3, 1942; Chicago, Illinois, U.S.
- Died: December 26, 1999 (aged 57) Roswell, Georgia, U.S.
- Genres: Soul; R&B; funk; progressive soul; gospel; psychedelic soul
- Occupations: Singer-songwriter; guitarist; record producer
- Instruments: Vocals; guitar; piano; keyboards
- Works: Curtis Mayfield discography
- Years active: 1956–1999
- Labels: Curtom; Warner Bros.; Rhino
- Formerly of: The Impressions
- Website: https://www.curtismayfield.com/

Curtis Lee Mayfield (June 3, 1942 – December 26, 1999) was an American singer-songwriter, guitarist, and record producer. Dubbed the Gentle Genius, he is considered one of the most influential musicians of soul and socially conscious African-American music. Mayfield first achieved success and recognition with the vocal group the Impressions during the civil rights movement of the late 1950s and the 1960s, and later worked as a solo artist.

Mayfield started his musical career in a gospel choir. Moving to the North Side of Chicago, he met Jerry Butler in 1956 at the age of 14 and joined the Impressions. The group's lead singer and primary songwriter, Mayfield became noted as one of the first musicians to bring more prevalent themes of social awareness into soul music. In 1965, he wrote "People Get Ready" for the Impressions, which was ranked No. 24 in Rolling Stone's list of the "500 Greatest Songs of All Time" in 2004. The song received numerous other awards; it was included in the Rock and Roll Hall of Fame's "500 Songs that Shaped Rock and Roll", and was inducted into the Grammy Hall of Fame in 1998.

After leaving the Impressions in 1970 in pursuit of a solo career, Mayfield released several albums throughout the decade, including his debut Curtis (1970) and the soundtrack for the 1972 blaxploitation film Super Fly. The soundtrack was noted for its socially conscious themes, primarily addressing issues that heavily affected inner city residents and racial minorities such as crime, poverty and drug abuse. The album was ranked No. 72 in Rolling Stone's list of the "500 Greatest Albums of All Time" in 2003.

On August 13, 1990, Mayfield was paralyzed from the neck down during an accident in which lighting equipment fell on him during a live performance at Wingate Field in Flatbush, Brooklyn, New York. Despite this, he continued his career as a recording artist, releasing his final album New World Order in 1996. Mayfield won a Grammy Legend Award in 1994 and a Grammy Lifetime Achievement Award in 1995. He is a double inductee into the Rock and Roll Hall of Fame, as a member of the Impressions in 1991, and again in 1999 as a solo artist. He is also a three-time Grammy Hall of Fame inductee. He died from complications of type 2 diabetes at the age of 57 on December 26, 1999.

== Early life ==
Curtis Lee Mayfield was born on Wednesday, June 3, 1942, in Cook County Hospital in Chicago, Illinois, the son of Marion Washington and Kenneth Mayfield, one of five children. Mayfield's father left the family when Curtis was five; his mother (and maternal grandmother) moved the family into several Chicago public housing projects before settling in Cabrini–Green during his teen years. Mayfield attended Wells High School before dropping out his second year. His mother taught him piano and, along with his grandmother, encouraged him to enjoy gospel music. At the age of seven he sang publicly at his aunt's church with the Northern Jubilee Gospel Singers.

Mayfield received his first guitar when he was ten, later recalling that he loved his guitar so much he used to sleep with it. He was a self-taught musician, and he grew up admiring blues singer Muddy Waters and Spanish guitarist Andres Segovia.

When he was 14 years old, he formed the Alphatones when the Northern Jubilee Gospel Singers decided to try their luck in downtown Chicago and Mayfield stayed behind. Fellow group member Sam Gooden was quoted "It would have been nice to have him there with us, but of course, your parents have the first say."

Later in 1956, he joined his high school friend Jerry Butler's group The Roosters with brothers Arthur and Richard Brooks. He wrote and composed songs for this group who would become The Impressions two years later. He was also notably a childhood friend of fellow musician Terry Callier.

== Career ==
=== The Impressions ===
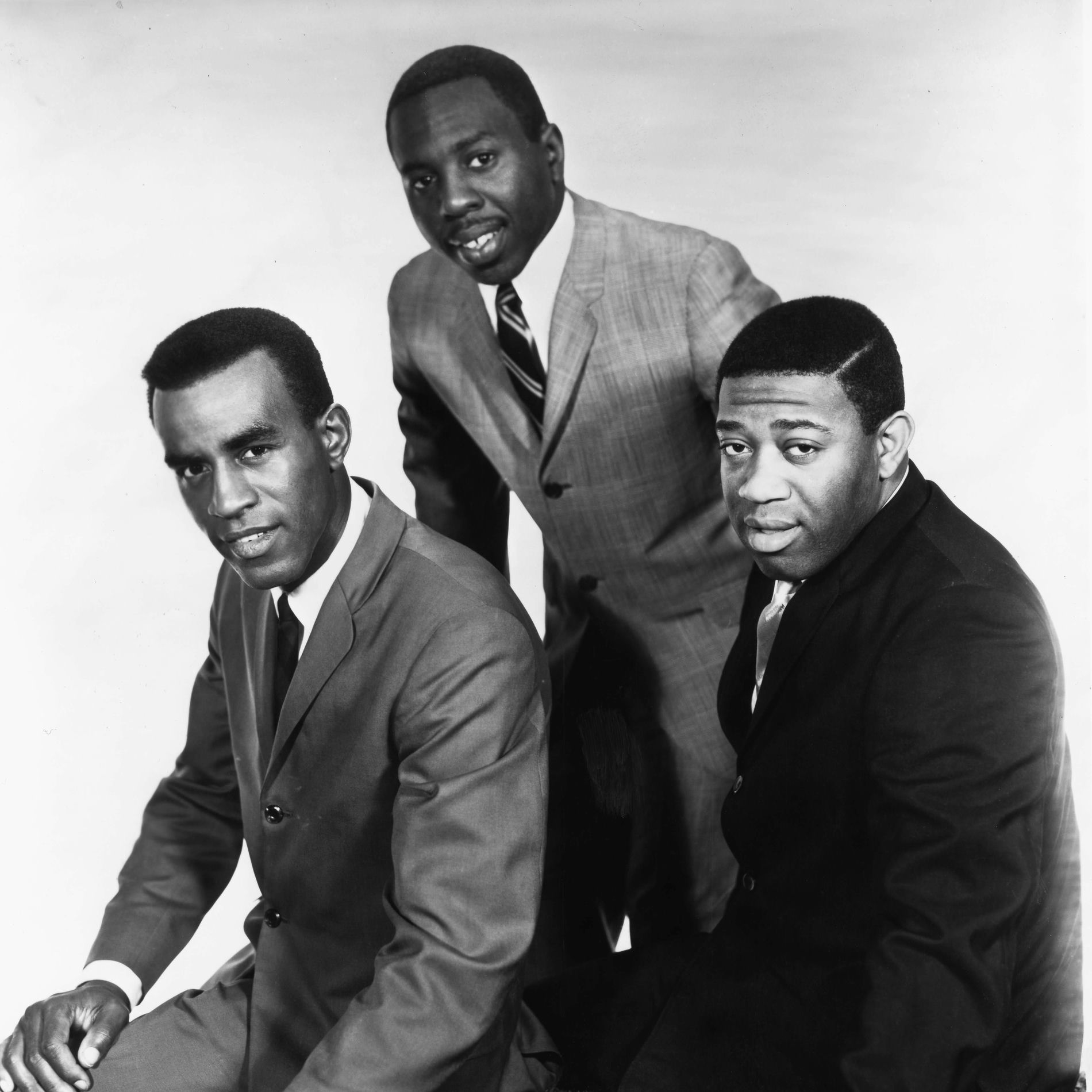
The Impressions in 1964, from left to right: Sam Gooden, Curtis Mayfield, and Fred Cash

Mayfield's career began in 1956 when he joined the Roosters with Arthur and Richard Brooks and Jerry Butler. Two years later the Roosters, now including Sam Gooden, became the Impressions. The band had two hit singles with Butler, "For Your Precious Love" and "Come Back My Love", then Butler left. Mayfield temporarily went with him, co-writing and performing on Butler's next hit, "He Will Break Your Heart", before returning to the Impressions with the group signing for ABC Records and working with the label's Chicago-based producer/A&R manager, Johnny Pate.

Butler was replaced by Fred Cash, a returning original Roosters member, and Mayfield became lead singer, frequently composing for the band, starting with "Gypsy Woman", a Top 20 Pop hit. Their hit "Amen" (Top 10), an updated version of an old gospel tune, was included in the soundtrack of the 1963 United Artists film Lilies of the Field, which starred Sidney Poitier. The Impressions reached the height of their popularity in the mid-to-late-'60s with a string of Mayfield compositions that included "Keep On Pushing", "People Get Ready", "It's All Right" (Top 10), the up-tempo "Talking about My Baby"(Top 20) and "Woman's Got Soul".

He formed his own label, Curtom Records, in Chicago in 1968 and the Impressions joined him to continue their run of hits including "Fool For You", "This is My Country", "Choice Of Colors" and "Check Out Your Mind". Mayfield had written much of the soundtrack of the Civil Rights Movement in the early 1960s, but by the end of the decade, he was a pioneering voice in the black pride movement along with James Brown and Sly Stone. Mayfield's "We're a Winner" was their last major hit for ABC. Reaching number 14 on Billboard's pop chart and number one on the R&B chart, it became an anthem of the black power and black pride movements when it was released in late 1967, much as his earlier "Keep on Pushing" (whose title is quoted in the lyrics of "We're a Winner" and also in "Move On Up") had been an anthem for Martin Luther King Jr. and the Civil Rights Movement.

Mayfield was a prolific songwriter in Chicago even outside his work for the Impressions, writing and producing scores of hits for many other artists. He also owned the Mayfield and Windy C labels which were distributed by Cameo-Parkway, and was a partner in the Curtom (first independent, then distributed by Buddah then Warner Bros and finally RSO) and Thomas labels (first independent, then distributed by Atlantic, then independent again and finally Buddah).

Among Mayfield's greatest songwriting successes were three hits that he wrote for Jerry Butler on Vee Jay ("He Will Break Your Heart", "Find Another Girl" and "I'm A-Tellin' You"). His harmony vocals are very prominent. He also had great success writing and arranging Jan Bradley's "Mama Didn't Lie". Starting in 1963, he was heavily involved in writing and arranging for OKeh Records (with Carl Davis producing), which included hits by Major Lance such as "Um, Um, Um, Um, Um, Um" and "The Monkey Time", as well as Walter Jackson, Billy Butler and the Artistics. This arrangement ran through 1965.

=== Solo career ===
In 1970, Mayfield left the Impressions and began a solo career. Curtom released many of Mayfield's 1970s records, as well as records by the Impressions, Leroy Hutson, the Five Stairsteps, the Staples Singers, Mavis Staples, Linda Clifford, The Natural Four, The Notations and Baby Huey and the Babysitters. Gene Chandler and Major Lance, who had worked with Mayfield during the 1960s, also signed for short stays at Curtom. Many of the label's recordings were produced by Mayfield.

Mayfield's first solo album, Curtis, was released in 1970, and hit the top 20, as well as being a critical success. It pre-dated Marvin Gaye's album, What's Going On, to which it has been compared in addressing social change. The commercial and critical peak of his solo career came with Super Fly, the soundtrack to the blaxploitation Super Fly film, which topped the Billboard Top LPs chart and sold more than 12 million copies. Unlike the soundtracks to other blaxploitation films (most notably Isaac Hayes' score for Shaft), which glorified the ghetto excesses of the characters, Mayfield's lyrics consisted of hard-hitting commentary on the state of affairs in black, urban ghettos at the time, as well as direct criticisms of several characters in the film. Bob Donat wrote in Rolling Stone magazine in 1972 that while the film's message "was diluted by schizoid cross-purposes" because it "glamorizes machismo-cocaine consciousness... the anti-drug message on [Mayfield's soundtrack] is far stronger and more definite than in the film." Because of the tendency of these blaxploitation films to glorify the criminal life of dealers and pimps to target a mostly black lower class audience, Mayfield's album set this movie apart. With songs like "Freddie's Dead", a song that focuses on the demise of Freddie, a junkie that was forced into "pushin' dope for the man" because of a debt that he owed to his dealer, and "Pusherman", a song that reveals how many people in the ghetto fell victim to drug abuse, and therefore became dependent upon their dealers, Mayfield illuminated a darker side of life in the ghetto that these blaxploitation films often failed to criticize. However, although Mayfield's soundtrack criticized the glorification of dealers and pimps, he in no way denied that this glorification was occurring. When asked about the subject matter of these films he was quoted stating "I don't see why people are complaining about the subject of these films", and "The way you clean up the films is by cleaning up the streets."

Along with What's Going On and Stevie Wonder's Innervisions, this album ushered in a new socially conscious, funky style of popular soul music. The single releases "Freddie's Dead" and "Super Fly" each sold more than one million copies, and were awarded gold discs by the R.I.A.A.

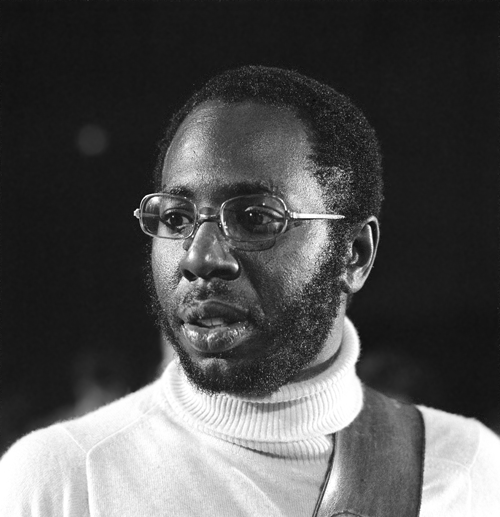
Mayfield performing for Dutch television in 1972

Super Fly brought success that resulted in Mayfield being tapped for additional soundtracks, some of which he wrote and produced while having others perform the vocals. Gladys Knight & the Pips recorded Mayfield's soundtrack for Claudine in 1974, while Aretha Franklin recorded the soundtrack for Sparkle in 1976. Mayfield also worked with The Staples Singers on the soundtrack for the 1975 film Let's Do It Again, and teamed up with Mavis Staples exclusively on the 1977 film soundtrack A Piece of the Action (both movies were part of a trilogy of films that featured the acting and comedic exploits of Bill Cosby and Sidney Poitier and were directed by Poitier).

In 1973, Mayfield released the anti-war album Back to the World, a concept album that dealt with the social aftermath of the Vietnam War and criticized the United States' involvement in wars across the planet. One of Mayfield's most successful funk-disco meldings was the 1977 hit "Do Do Wap is Strong in Here" from his soundtrack to the Robert M. Young film of Miguel Piñero's play Short Eyes. In his 2003 biography of Curtis Mayfield, People Never Give Up, author Peter Burns noted that Mayfield has 140 songs in the Curtom vaults. Burns indicated that the songs were maybe already completed or in the stages of completion, so that they could then be released commercially. These recordings include "The Great Escape", "In The News", "Turn up the Radio", "What's The Situation?" and one recording labelled "Curtis at Montreux Jazz Festival 87". Two other albums featuring Curtis Mayfield present in the Curtom vaults and as yet unissued are a 1982/83 live recording titled "25th Silver Anniversary" (which features performances by Mayfield, the Impressions, and Jerry Butler) and a live performance, recorded in September 1966 by the Impressions titled Live at the Club Chicago.

In 1982, Mayfield decided to move to Atlanta with his family, closing down his recording operation in Chicago. The label had gradually reduced in size in its final two years or so with releases on the main RSO imprint and Curtom credited as the production company. Mayfield continued to record occasionally, keeping the Curtom name alive for a few more years, and to tour worldwide. Mayfield's song "(Don't Worry) If There's a Hell Below, We're All Going to Go" has been included as an entrance song on every episode of the drama series The Deuce. The Deuce tells of the germination of the sex-trade industry in the heart of New York's Times Square in the 1970s. Mayfield's career began to slow down during the 1980s.

In later years, Mayfield's music was included in the movies I'm Gonna Git You Sucka, Hollywood Shuffle, Friday (though not on the soundtrack album), Bend It Like Beckham, The Hangover Part II and Short Eyes, where he had a cameo role as a prisoner.

== Social activism ==
"His most affecting songs carried the optimism and conviction of the Rev. Martin Luther King Jr.'s most celebrated sermons. His music was a major influence on many of today's most influential rap and hip-hop stars, from Lauryn Hill to Public Enemy."

— Los Angeles Times Pop Music Critic Robert Hilburn (1999)

Mayfield sang openly about civil rights and black pride, and was known for introducing social consciousness into African-American music. Having been raised in the Cabrini-Green projects of Chicago, he witnessed many of the tragedies of the urban ghetto first hand, and was quoted saying "With everything I saw on the streets as a young black kid, it wasn't hard during the later fifties and sixties for me to write my heartfelt way of how I visualized things, how I thought things ought to be."

Following the passing of the Civil Rights Act of 1964, his group the Impressions produced music that became the soundtrack to a summer of revolution. It is even said that "Keep On Pushing" became the number one sing along during the Freedom Rides. Black students sang their songs as they marched to jail or protested outside their universities, while King often used "Keep On Pushing", "People Get Ready" and "We're A Winner" because of their ability to motivate and inspire marchers. Mayfield had quickly become a civil rights hero with his ability to inspire hope and courage.

Mayfield was unique in his ability to fuse relevant social commentary with melodies and lyrics that instilled a hopefulness for a better future in his listeners. He wrote and recorded the soundtrack to the 1972 blaxploitation film Super Fly with the help of producer Johnny Pate. The soundtrack for Super Fly is regarded as a body of work that captured the essence of life in the ghetto while criticizing the tendency of young people to glorify the "glamorous" lifestyles of drug dealers and pimps, and illuminating the dark realities of drugs, addiction, and exploitation.

Mayfield, along with several other soul and funk musicians, spread messages of hope in the face of oppression, pride in being a member of the black race and gave courage to a generation of people who were demanding their human rights. He has been compared to Martin Luther King Jr. for making a lasting impact in the civil rights struggle with his inspirational music. By the end of the decade Mayfield was a pioneering voice in the black pride movement, along with James Brown and Sly Stone. Paving the way for a future generation of rebel thinkers, Mayfield paid the price, artistically and commercially, for his politically charged music. Mayfield's "Keep On Pushing" was actually banned from several radio stations, including WLS in his hometown of Chicago. Regardless of the persistent radio bans and loss of revenue, he continued his quest for equality right until his death.

Mayfield was also a descriptive social commentator. As the influx of drugs ravaged through black America in the late 1960s and 1970s his bittersweet descriptions of the ghetto would serve as warnings to the impressionable. "Freddie's Dead" is a graphic tale of street life, while "Pusherman" revealed the role of drug dealers in the urban ghettos.

== Personal life ==
Mayfield was married twice and had 10 children from three different relationships: two from his first marriage to Helen Mayfield, two with a woman named Diane, and six with his second wife, Altheida Mayfield, whom he was married to until his death.

=== Accident ===
On August 13, 1990, Mayfield became paralyzed from the neck down after stage lighting equipment fell on him while he was being introduced at an outdoor concert at Wingate Field in Flatbush, Brooklyn, New York. Two years after the accident, he sang the second verse of a remake of "Let's Do It Again" being produced by Gary Katz by the Repercussions for All Men Are Brothers: A Tribute to Curtis Mayfield, while lying on his back in the recording studio. Although he was unable to play the guitar, he continued to compose and sing, which he found he could do by lying down and letting gravity pull down on his chest and lungs. The 1996 album New World Order was recorded in this way, with vocals sometimes recorded in single lines at a time.

=== Final years and death ===
Mayfield received the Grammy Lifetime Achievement Award in 1994. In February 1998, he had to have his right leg amputated due to diabetes. He was inducted into the Rock & Roll Hall of Fame on March 15, 1999. Health reasons prevented him from attending the ceremony, which included fellow inductees Paul McCartney, Billy Joel, Bruce Springsteen, Dusty Springfield, George Martin, and 1970s Curtom signees and labelmates the Staple Singers.

Mayfield's last appearance on a record was with the group Bran Van 3000 on the song "Astounded" for their album Discosis, recorded just before his death and released in 2001. However, his health had steadily declined following his paralysis, so his vocals were not new but were instead lifted from archive recordings, including "Move On Up".

Mayfield died from complications of type 2 diabetes at 7:20 EST (12:20 GMT) on December 26, 1999, at the North Fulton Regional Hospital in Roswell, Georgia. He was survived by his wife, Altheida Mayfield; his mother, Mariam Jackson; 10 children; two sisters, Carolyn Falls and Judy Mayfield; a brother, Kenneth Mayfield; and seven grandchildren.

== Musical legacy ==
=== Influence ===
Mayfield was among the first of a new wave of mainstream black R&B performing artists and composers injecting social commentary into their work. This "message music" proved immensely popular during the 1960s and 1970s.

Mayfield taught himself how to play guitar, tuning it to the black keys of the piano, giving the guitar an open F-sharp tuning that he used throughout his career. He primarily sang in falsetto register. His guitar playing, singing, and socially aware song-writing influenced a range of artists, including Jimi Hendrix, Bob Marley, Tracy Chapman, Sly Stone, Marvin Gaye, Stevie Wonder and Sinéad O'Connor.

In 2017, it was reported that Lionel Richie had secured the rights to produce a biographical film about Mayfield. Richie said, "I'm so grateful to be working closely with [Mayfield's widow] Altheida Mayfield, [son] Cheaa Mayfield and the Curtis Mayfield Estate and couldn't be happier to be moving forward on this amazing project about a one-of-a-kind music genius."

=== Accolades ===
- The Impressions' 1965 hit song "People Get Ready", composed by Mayfield, has been chosen as one of the Top 10 Best Songs Of All Time by a panel of 20 top industry songwriters and producers, including Paul McCartney, Brian Wilson, Hal David, and others, as reported to Britain's Mojo music magazine.
- In 2019, Super Fly was selected by the Library of Congress for preservation in the National Recording Registry for being "culturally, historically, or aesthetically significant".

==== Rolling Stone rankings ====
- The Impressions hits, "People Get Ready" and "For Your Precious Love" are both ranked on Rolling Stone′s list of the 500 Greatest Songs of All Time, as No. 24 and No. 327 respectively.
- Mayfield is ranked No. 34 on Rolling Stone′s list of the 100 Greatest Guitarists of All Time.
- Mayfield is ranked no. 38 on Rolling Stone′s list of the 200 Greatest Singers of All Time.
- Mayfield is ranked No. 40 on Rolling Stone′s list of the 100 Greatest Singers of All Time.
- Mayfield is ranked No. 48 on Rolling Stone's list of the 250 Greatest Guitarists of All Time.
- Mayfield's album Super Fly is ranked No. 72 on Rolling Stone's list of the 500 Greatest Albums of All Time.
- Mayfield is ranked No. 78 on Rolling Stone′s list of the 100 Greatest Songwriters of All Time.
- In 2004, Rolling Stone ranked Mayfield No. 98 on their list of the 100 Greatest Artists of All Time.
- The Impressions' album/CD The Anthology 1961–1977 is ranked at No. 179 on Rolling Stone magazine's 500 Greatest Albums of All Time.
- Mayfield's eponymous album Curtis is ranked No. 275 on Rolling Stone's list of the 500 Greatest Albums of All Time.

== Awards and nominations ==
In 1972, the French Academy of Jazz awarded Mayfield's debut solo album Curtis the Prix Otis Redding for best R&B record.

=== Hall of Fame ===
- 1991: Along with his group the Impressions, he was inducted into the Rock and Roll Hall of Fame.
- 1999: Mayfield was inducted into The Rock and Roll Hall of Fame as a solo artist making him one of the few artists to become double inductees.
- 1999: Mayfield was inducted into the Songwriters Hall of Fame just prior to his death.
- 2003: As a member of the Impressions, he was posthumously inducted into the Vocal Group Hall of Fame.

=== Grammy Awards ===
Mayfield was nominated for eight Grammy Awards during his career. He is a winner of the prestigious Grammy Legend Award and Grammy Lifetime Achievement Award.

Year	Nominee / work	Award	Result
1964	"Keep On Pushing"	Best R&B Performance	Nominated
1972	"Freddie's Dead"	Best R&B Vocal Performance, Male	Nominated
1972	"Freddie's Dead"	Best R&B Song	Nominated
1972	"Junkie Chase"	Best R&B Instrumental Performance	Nominated
1972	Super Fly	Best Score Written for Motion Picture or Television Special	Nominated
1994	Himself	Legend Award	Won
1995	Himself	Lifetime Achievement Award	Won
1996	New World Order	Best R&B Vocal Performance, Male	Nominated
1997	"New World Order"	Best R&B Song	Nominated
1997	"Back to Living Again"	Best R&B Vocal Performance, Male	Nominated

==== Grammy Hall of Fame ====
Year	Nominee / work	Award	Result
1998	"People Get Ready" (with the Impressions)	Hall of Fame (Single)	Inducted
1998	Super Fly	Hall of Fame (Album)	Inducted
2019	"Move On Up"	Hall of Fame (Single)	Inducted

== Discography ==
- Curtis (1970)
- Roots (1971)
- Super Fly (1972)
- Back to the World (1973)
- Claudine (with Gladys Knight & the Pips) (1974)
- Sweet Exorcist (1974)
- Got to Find a Way (1974)
- Let's Do It Again (1975)
- There's No Place Like America Today (1975)
- Give, Get, Take and Have (1976)
- Sparkle (with Aretha Franklin) (1976)
- Never Say You Can't Survive (1977)
- Short Eyes (1977)
- Do It All Night (1978)
- Heartbeat (1979)
- Something to Believe In (1980)
- The Right Combination (with Linda Clifford) (1980)
- Love Is the Place (1982)
- Honesty (1983)
- We Come in Peace with a Message of Love (1985)
- Take It to the Streets (1990)
- New World Order (1996)

== Filmography ==
- Super Fly (1972) as himself
- Save the Children (1973) as himself
- Short Eyes (1977) as Pappy
- Sgt. Pepper's Lonely Hearts Club Band (1978) as Guest
