= Superfly (song) =

Single by Curtis Mayfield

from the album Superfly
- B-side: "Love to Keep You in My Mind"
- Released: October 1972
- Genre: Funk; psychedelic soul; cinematic soul; smooth soul
- Length: 3:08 (single edit); 3:53 (album version)
- Label: Curtom; Buddah
- Songwriter: Curtis Mayfield
- Producer: Curtis Mayfield

Curtis Mayfield singles chronology
"Freddie's Dead (Theme from Superfly)" (1972)	"Superfly" (1972)	"Future Shock" (1973)

"Superfly" is a song by American soul musician Curtis Mayfield, the title track from his 1972 soundtrack album for the film of the same name. It was the second single released from the album, following "Freddie's Dead (Theme from Superfly)", and reached No. 8 on the Billboard Hot 100 and No. 5 on the Best Selling Soul Singles chart. The lyrics celebrate the craftiness and determination of the film's main character. The song plays over the film's closing credits.

The bassline and the rototom percussion break from the song's introduction (performed by Joseph "Lucky" Scott and "Master" Henry Gibson, respectively) have repeatedly been sampled in songs including Beastie Boys' "Egg Man" from the 1989 album Paul's Boutique, The Notorious B.I.G.'s "Intro" from the 1994 album Ready to Die, Nelly's "Tilt Ya Head Back" featuring Christina Aguilera from the 2004 album Sweat and Goldie Lookin Chain's "Pusherman" from the 2016 album Pill Communication. Mayfield himself sampled the original song in "Superfly 1990", a duet he recorded with rapper Ice-T for the soundtrack of the 1990 film The Return of Superfly.

== Chart history ==
=== Weekly charts ===
Chart (1972–1973)	Peak position
U.S. Billboard Hot 100	8
U.S. Billboard Best Selling Soul Singles	5
U.S. Cash Box Top 100	6
U.S. Record World	6

=== Year-end charts ===
Chart (1973)	Rank
U.S. Billboard R&B	58
U.S. Billboard Hot 100	65
U.S. Cash Box	70

== Certifications ==
Certifications for "Super fly"
Region	Certification	Certified units/sales
United States (RIAA)	Gold	1,000,000^{^}
^{^} Shipments figures based on certification alone.

== Later uses ==
"Superfly" was sampled at the end of the 1973 John & Ernest break-in record "Super Fly Meets Shaft" (US #31).

The song appeared in the 1994 film Crooklyn, the 2009 film Madea Goes to Jail, the 2012 film Dark Shadows and the 2019 supernatural horror film The Curse of La Llorona.

The song was sampled by hip-hop group Outkast on their 1998 album Aquemini on the track "Return of the 'G'".

The song was covered by Canadian soul and R&B band jacksoul on their 2006 album mySOUL.
