= Super Fly (soundtrack) =

1972 soundtrack album by Curtis Mayfield

Soundtrack album studio album by Curtis Mayfield
- Released: July 11, 1972
- Recorded: December 1971 – May 1972
- Studios: Curtom (Chicago); Bell Sound (New York City)
- Genres: Psychedelic soul; funk; progressive soul; cinematic soul
- Length: 36:58
- Label: Curtom
- Producer: Curtis Mayfield

Curtis Mayfield chronology
Roots (1971)	Super Fly (1972)	Back to the World (1973)

Alternative cover
- Deluxe 25th anniversary edition cover

Singles from Super Fly
- 1. "Freddie's Dead" Released: July 1972; 2. "Superfly" Released: October 1972

Super Fly is the third studio album by American soul musician Curtis Mayfield, released on July 11, 1972, by Curtom Records as the soundtrack for the blaxploitation film of the same name. The album was Mayfield's first full soundtrack, and his third solo effort since leaving the Impressions. Super Fly was a commercial success, peaking at number 1 on the Billboard Top 200 and selling over 500,000 copies in the United States, with an estimated 1.5 million sold in total. Super Fly outsold the film it accompanied, with performance bolstered by Hot 100 top 10 singles "Freddie's Dead" and title track "Superfly".

The critical and commercial success of Super Fly led to its nomination for Best Score Soundtrack for Visual Media at the 15th Annual Grammy Awards, losing to Nino Rota's The Godfather (1971). Super Fly remains one of only three blaxploitation soundtracks to be nominated for a Grammy, alongside Isaac Hayes Jr.'s Shaft (1971) and the Norman Whitfield/Rose Royce collaboration Car Wash (1977). Due to the soundtrack's success, Mayfield was tapped to produce several film soundtracks over the course of the decade in collaboration with high-profile soul artists such as Gladys Knight & The Pips, (Note: Claudine (1974)) The Staples Singers, (Note: Let's Do It Again (1975)) and Aretha Franklin. (Note: Sparkle (1976))

Super Fly was one of the first soul concept albums. It was noted for its stark lyrics about poverty and drug abuse, which were informed both by Mayfield's disagreements with the film's neutral treatment of drugs and drug dealers and his personal experiences growing up around the dangers of both. The album is frequently sampled and interpolated by modern artists, and represents "one of the high watermarks of arguably the most fertile and creative era in soul music’s history". For its lyrical messaging and influence on both contemporary soul and the nascent genres of hip-hop and rap, the album is often cited as one of the best albums of all time.

== Background ==
Mayfield had previously contributed two songs to Krakatoa, East of Java, which marked his first foray into soundtrack work. Following his departure from The Impressions in 1970 and his first solo releases Curtis (1970) and Roots (1971), Mayfield's next soundtrack project began with a suggestion from Gordon Parks Jr. Parks – son of Shaft director Gordon Parks – was working on Super Fly as his directorial debut and asked Mayfield and his backing band to cameo in a scene as a nightclub act in the background. Parks wanted a full song to play in the scene, which led to the beginning of soundtrack sessions.

== Production and release ==
The recording session for the song "Pusherman" took place at Bell Sound Studios in New York, followed by a months-long hiatus while Mayfield focused on other projects (writing The Impressions' Times Have Changed and working on his own album, Back to the World). The instrumentals for the remaining songs were produced in a three-day session at a former RCA studio in Chicago, which involved an in-studio band of as many as 40 performers. Regarding the recording environment, Guitarist Craig McMullen states, "The advantage of it is, if you have a full orchestra, when you place your licks, you don't have to worry about your licks bumping. You can hear everything that's going to go down."

The album was primarily written by Mayfield from a basement apartment in Chicago while undergoing a trial separation from his wife and children. Mayfield drew on his own experience to relate to the film and so inform his songwriting, telling Rolling Stone "I didn't have to leave my neighborhood to understand what Super Fly was about." Mayfield was at odds with how the pitfalls of drug use were addressed by the film - per his second wife, Altheida Mayfield, "Curtis thought ‘Super Fly’ was a commercial to sell cocaine and he wanted to turn that around. That was his main purpose there, to say ‘This is nothing pretty.’". This informed the album's lyrics, which were centered on the ills of a culture that the film depicted on more ambiguous terms.

Super Fly was originally released in 1972 on Curtom Records in both LP and eight-track formats, three weeks prior to the release of the accompanying film, with additional distribution handled throughout Europe and Asia by Buddah Records.The release was complicated by a dispute with arranger Johnny Pate over songwriting credit on the song "Think", which would mark the end of Mayfield and Pate's working relationship. On November 11, 1997, Rhino Records released a 25th Anniversary collection of the album with a bonus disc of demo versions of songs, radio spots, and interviews with Mayfield discussing his writing process, and a 1999 reissue of the album included new mixes of "Freddie's Dead" and "Superfly" as bonus tracks.

== Sales and reception ==
Professional ratings
Review scores
Source	Rating
AllMusic	5/5 stars
Christgau's Record Guide	A−
Los Angeles Times	4/4 stars
Pitchfork	9.1/10
Q	5/5 stars
The Rolling Stone Album Guide (2004)	5/5 stars
The Virgin Encyclopedia of Popular Music (2002)	5/5 stars

Super Fly was RIAA certified Gold within three months of release for reaching 500,000 in album sales in the U.S., with some outlets reporting global sales of 1.5 million. The album released to universal acclaim, with Rolling Stone's Bob Donat calling it "not only a superior, imaginative soundtrack, but fine funky music as well and the best of Curtis Mayfield's four albums made since he left the Impressions". Rock critic Robert Christgau of The Village Voice gave the album an A− and lauded Mayfield's songwriting, writing that "these songs speak for (and to) the ghetto's victims rather than its achievers (cf. 'The Other Side of Town', on Curtis), transmitting bleak lyrics through uncompromisingly vivacious music." Robin Katz of Disc praised the album stating to not mistake it as a "big bad blaring instrumental LP. This is Curtis Mayfield combining a fine musical message with gentle vocals but powerful lyrics" and "[N]ine tracks on the album and what never fails to amaze me is how Mayfield balances his instrumental work and lyrics without overdoing either. It is a touchy situation, but Mayfield handles it brilliantly."The album itself as well as songs "Freddie's Dead" and "Junkie Chase" received nominations at the 15th Annual Grammy Awards, with the former also performed at the ceremony.

In the Virgin Encyclopedia of Popular Music (2002), writer Colin Larkin gave the album a five-star rating. A 2002 review of the 1997 re-release from BBC Music praised the soundtrack for its wealth of "acutely observed, incisively written, and gently phrased observations on black life in the early 1970s." In a 2004 review of the album, Rolling Stone gave Super Fly five out of five stars and cited it as Mayfield's "creative breakthrough". Charles Taylor of The Boston Phoenix deems "Superfly," "Pusherman" and "Freddie's Dead" to "remain [Mayfield's] paramount achievement, as hard and pitiless as any music ever to make the charts." John Bush of AllMusic praised the album's lyrical substance and sound, calling it a "melange of deep, dark grooves, trademarked wah-wah guitar, and stinging brass". On its significance, Bush concluded by stating "Super Fly ignited an entire genre of music, the blaxploitation soundtrack, and influenced everyone from soul singers to television-music composers for decades to come. It stands alongside Saturday Night Fever and Never Mind the Bollocks Here's the Sex Pistols as one of the most vivid touchstones of '70s pop music.".

In a positive retrospective review for Pitchfork, Mychal Smith notes the political relevance of Super Fly's messages to early 70's U.S. politics, in particular the issues facing the black population:"[...]Super Fly perfectly encapsulates the post-Civil Rights/early Black Power feel of black America struggling to survive the social and political consequences of the nation's conservative backlash. [...]The lyrics were as much [Mayfield's] personal reflection on ghetto life as they were based on the characters of the film."

== Legacy ==
The album is ranked number 986 in All-Time Top 1000 Albums (3rd edition, 2000). In 2003, VH1 named Super Fly the 63rd greatest album of all time. The title track was selected by the Rock and Roll Hall of Fame as one of the "500 Songs that Shaped Rock and Roll". In 2003, the album was ranked number 69 on Rolling Stone magazine's list of the 500 greatest albums of all time, 72 in a 2012 revised list, and 76 in a 2020 revised list. In 2011, NME ranked Super Fly as the 13th best film soundtrack of all time. In 2019, the album was selected by the Library of Congress for preservation in the National Recording Registry for being "culturally, historically, or aesthetically significant". In June 2026, CBS News included Pusherman in its list of the 250 essential American songs of the past 250 years.

Super Fly was a formative work in the development of the hip hop and rap genres, and has been cited as an influence and sampled by the likes of Beastie Boys, The Notorious B.I.G., Erykah Badu, Snoop Dogg, Eminem, Chance the Rapper, and Beyoncé. The singer Bilal names it among his 25 favorite albums, explaining that, "I just think that's one of the best movie soundtrack albums ever...[J]ust listen to the soundtrack and you already know the whole movie. It's just killer the way he did that." Mychal Smith notes the impact Super Fly had on the genre of blaxploitation soundtracks in particular, noting Mayfield had "inspired imitations [...] such as Bobby Womack’s "Across 110th Street", James Brown’s Black Caesar, and Willie Hutch’s The Mack."

== Track listing ==
=== Original LP ===
All songs are written by Curtis Mayfield.

Side one
No.	Title	Length
1.	"Little Child Runnin' Wild"	5:23
2.	"Pusherman"	5:04
3.	"Freddie's Dead"	5:27
4.	"Junkie Chase" (instrumental)	1:36

Side two
No.	Title	Length
5.	"Give Me Your Love (Love Song)"	4:20
6.	"Eddie You Should Know Better"	2:16
7.	"No Thing on Me (Cocaine Song)"	4:53
8.	"Think" (instrumental)	3:43
9.	"Superfly"	3:55

=== Reissues ===
1997 Rhino Deluxe 25th Anniversary Collection (Disc one) / 1999 Rhino reissue
No.	Title	Length
10.	"Freddie's Dead (Theme from Superfly)" (single mix)	3:20
11.	"Superfly" (single mix)	3:08

1997 Rhino Deluxe 25th Anniversary Collection (Disc two)
No.	Title	Length
1.	"Ghetto Child" (demo version of "Little Child Runnin' Wild")	3:18
2.	"Pusherman" (alternate mix)	6:10
3.	"Freddie's Dead" (instrumental version)	4:48
4.	"Junkie Chase (Instrumental)" (full-length version)	4:18
5.	"No Thing on Me (Cocaine Song)" (instrumental version)	4:36
6.	"Militant March"	0:54
7.	"Eddie You Should Know Better" (instrumental version)	2:17
8.	"Radio Spot #1"	0:28
9.	"The Underground" (demo)	3:13
10.	"Check Out Your Mind" (instrumental version)	4:06
11.	"Radio Spot #2"	0:28
12.	"Curtis Mayfield interview on Superfly film and songwriting"	7:02

== Personnel ==
- Curtis Mayfield – vocals, guitar, producer
- Phil Upchurch – guitar
- Joseph Lucky Scott – bass (all tracks)
- Master Henry Gibson – percussion (all tracks)
- Tyrone McCullen – drums ("Pusherman")
- Morris Jennings – drums (all tracks except "Pusherman")
- Craig McMullen – guitar (all tracks)
- Roger Anfinsen – engineer
- Johnny Pate – orchestrator, arranger
- Glen Christensen – art direction
- Milton Sincoff – packaging
- Harry "Slip" Lepp – trombone

== Charts ==
All charts are from Billboard.

=== Album ===
Year	Chart	Peak position
1972	Top 100 Albums	1
1972	Top Soul Albums	1
1973	Top Jazz Albums	2
1988	Top R&B/Hip-Hop Albums	88

=== Singles ===
Year	Single	Chart	Peak position
1972	"Freddie's Dead"	Hot 100	4
1972	"Freddie's Dead"	Top Soul Singles	2
1973	"Superfly"	Hot 100	8
1973	"Superfly"	Top Soul Singles	5

== See also ==
- List of number-one albums of 1972 (U.S.)
- List of number-one R&B albums of 1972 (U.S.)
