= Live in Europe (Curtis Mayfield album) =

Live album by Curtis Mayfield
- Released: 1988
- Recorded: July 1987
- Genre: Funk; soul
- Label: Curtom
- Producer: Curtis Mayfield

Curtis Mayfield chronology
| We Come in Peace with a Message of Love (1985) | Live in Europe (1988) | People Get Ready: Live at Ronnie Scott's (1988) |

Alternative cover
- Live in Europe alternative cover.

Professional ratings
Review scores
| Source | Rating |
|---|---|
| Allmusic | link |

Live in Europe is a live Curtis Mayfield album released in 1988.

== Track listing ==
All tracks composed by Curtis Mayfield; except where indicated

1. Introduction – 00:35
2. "Ice 9" – 03:44
3. "Back to the World" – 05:45
4. "It's Alright"/"Amen" – 03:57
5. "Gypsy Woman" – 04:17
6. "Freddie's Dead" – 06:15
7. "Pusherman" – 06:52
8. "We've Gotta Have Peace" – 04:03
9. "We've Only Just Begun" (Paul Williams, Roger Nichols) – 03:53
10. "People Get Ready" – 03:41
11. "Move On Up" – 08:25
12. "(Don't Worry) If There's a Hell Below, We're All Going to Go" – 05:10
13. "When Seasons Change" – 05:17

== Personnel ==
- Curtis Mayfield – vocals, guitar, "music coloring"
- Joseph Scott, Lebron Scott – bass
- Buzz Amato – keyboards
- Lee Goodness – drums
- Master Henry Gibson – percussion

Technical

- Carlos Glover – engineer
