= Sleepless (Jacksoul album) =

Studio album by jacksoul
- Released: April 4, 2000
- Genre: R&B, soul
- Length: 46:00
- Label: ViK. Recordings
- Producer: Jon "Rabbi" Levine

Jacksoul chronology
Absolute (1996)	Sleepless (2000)	Resurrected (2004)

Sleepless is the second album by Canadian R&B/soul band jacksoul, released in 2000. The album featured the singles "Can't Stop", "Somedays" and "I Know What You Want".

The album won the Juno Award for R&B/Soul Recording of the Year at the Juno Awards of 2001.

== Track listing ==
All tracks produced by Jon "Rabbi" Levine, except where noted.

No.	Title	Writer(s)	Producer(s)	Length
1.	"Sleepless Intro"	Haydain Neale, Brent Setterington		0:45
2.	"I Know What You Want"	Levine, Neale, Robert Walton		3:48
3.	"Can't Stop"	Levine		3:59
4.	"Let Me Call You Baby"	Neale, Setterington		3:34
5.	"I Miss You"	Levine		3:15
6.	"Somedays"	Levine		4:36
7.	"Never Say Goodbye"	James McCollum, Neale		4:32
8.	"She's Gone"	Daryl Hall, John Oates	Levine, Jelleestone	3:11
9.	"Never Give Your Love Away"	McCollum, Neale	Walton	4:35
10.	"Baby I Adore You"	Neale	Walton	4:34
11.	"I Remember"	Neale, Setterington		4:08
12.	"Don't Tell Me"	Neale, Setterington		4:32
13.	"Sleepless"	Neale, Setterington		4:30

== Personnel ==
Adapted credits from the liner notes of Sleepless.

Vocals

- Lead vocals – Haydain Neale
- Background vocals – Jully Black, Marcie English, Haydain Neale, Lorraine Scott, Liberty Silver

Instruments

- Acoustic guitar – James McCollum
- Bass – Colin Barret, J.K., Haydain Neale
- Cello – Akiko Kojima
- Keyboards – Jon "Rabbi" Levine, Brent Setterington
- Piano – Brent Setterington ("Don't Tell Me")
- Shaker – Davide DiRenzo
- Violins – Sonja Jung, Alex McMaster

Production

- Engineering – Brad Haehnel, Tom Heron, Peter Hudson, Ed Kroutner
- Engineering assistant – Chris Stringer, Stu Young
- Mastering – Herb Powers
- Mixing – Brad Haehnel
- Mixing assistant – Joel Kazmi, Robert "Taj" Walton ("Baby I Adore You")

Imagery

- Art direction and design – Beehive
- Hair – Brian and Rhonda (World Salon, Toronto)
- Makeup – Jody Daye
- Photography – Margaret Malandruccolo
- Styling – Alina Karaman
