= Super Fly Meets Shaft =

Single by John & Ernest
- B-side: "Part Two"; also, "Problems"
- Released: April 1973
- Genre: Novelty/R&B
- Length: 2:25
- Label: Rainy Wednesday
- Songwriters: Dickie Goodman, Sal Passantino
- Producers: Dickie Goodman, Sal Passantino

John & Ernest singles chronology
"Super Fly Meets Shaft" (1973)	"Soul President Number One" (1973)

"Super Fly Meets Shaft" is a break-in record co-written by Dickie Goodman and recorded by John & Ernest. It consists of lines from popular R&B/soul songs of the day, which tell a story about the main characters from the films Super Fly (1972) and Shaft (1971).

"Super Fly Meets Shaft" became an American hit in the spring of 1973, reaching #31 on the Billboard Hot 100.

== Background ==
Among the songs sampled in the record is Billy Paul's "Me and Mrs. Jones", with three excerpts. Others include:

- "S.O.S. (Stop Her On Sight)" - Winfield Parker
- "I Gotcha" - Joe Tex
- "Papa Was a Rollin' Stone" - The Temptations
- "Keeper of the Castle" - Four Tops
- "I'll Be Around" - The Spinners
- "I Got Ants in My Pants" - James Brown
- "Theme from Shaft" - Isaac Hayes
- "Back Stabbers" - The O'Jays
- "Could It Be I'm Falling in Love" - The Spinners
- "Love Train" - The O'Jays
- "Freddie's Dead" - Curtis Mayfield
- "Daddy's Home" - Jermaine Jackson
- "Superfly" - Curtis Mayfield

== Chart history ==
Chart (1973)	Peak position
U.S. Billboard Hot 100	31
U.S. Cash Box Top 100	43
U.S. Record World	38
