= Can't Stop (Jacksoul song) =

2000 single by jacksoul

Single by jacksoul

from the album Sleepless
- Released: February 2000
- Genre: R&B/soul
- Length: 4:48; 3:46 (Radio edit)
- Label: Sony Music Entertainment
- Songwriter(s): Jason Brett Levine, Jonathan David Levine

"Can't Stop" is a song by Canadian soul and R&B music group jacksoul. It was released in February 2000 as the lead single from their second studio album, Sleepless. The song was a hit in Canada, reaching #8 on Canada's singles chart. The song was nominated for "Best Single" at the 2001 Juno Awards. Also in 2001 the song was named by SOCAN as one of Canada's most performed pop songs.

== Track listing ==
1. Can't Stop (radio edit)
2. Can't Stop (original album version)
3. Sleepless

== Music video ==
The music video for "Can't Stop" features lead singer Haydain Neale walking around various parts of Los Angeles. The video reached the #2 spot on MuchMusic Countdown for two consecutive weeks.

== Charts ==
Chart (2000)	Peak position
Canada Top Singles (RPM)	8
