= Live at Ronnie Scott's (Curtis Mayfield album) =

People Get Ready: Live at Ronnie Scott's

Live album by Curtis Mayfield
- Released: 1988
- Recorded: 31 July 1988
- Genre: Funk; soul
- Label: Curtom
- Producer: Roger Lemkin, Stephen Cleary

Curtis Mayfield chronology
Live in Europe (1988)	People Get Ready: Live at Ronnie Scott's (1988)	Take It to the Streets (1990)

Professional ratings
Review scores
Source	Rating
Allmusic	3.5/5 stars

People Get Ready: Live at Ronnie Scott's is an album by Curtis Mayfield recorded at Ronnie Scott's Jazz Club.

== Track listing ==
1. "Little Child Runnin' Wild" – 05:54
2. "It's Allright" – 04:00
3. "People Get Ready" – 03:24
4. "Pusherman" – 07:31
5. "Freddie's Dead" – 06:29
6. "I'm So Proud" – 03:57
7. "Billy Jack" – 06:57
8. "We Got to Have Peace" – 04:26
9. "Move on Up" – 07:40
10. "To Be Invisible" – 04:17

== Personnel ==
- Curtis Mayfield – guitar, vocals
- Benny Scott – bass
- Buzz Amato – keyboards
- Lee Goodness – drums
- Luis Stefanell – percussion
