= Got to Find a Way =

Studio album by Curtis Mayfield
- Released: November 1974
- Studios: Curtom, Chicago, Illinois
- Genres: Funk, soul
- Length: 33:51
- Label: Curtom
- Producer: Curtis Mayfield

Curtis Mayfield chronology
Sweet Exorcist (1974)	Got to Find a Way (1974)	There's No Place Like America Today (1975)

Singles from Got to Find a Way
- 1. "Mother's Son / Love Me (Right in the Pocket)" Released: 1974

Professional ratings
Review scores
Source	Rating
AllMusic	3/5 stars

Got to Find a Way is the sixth studio album by Curtis Mayfield, released in 1974 under Curtom Records. It peaked at number 76 on the Billboard 200 chart, as well as number 17 on the Top R&B/Hip-Hop Albums chart.

== Track listing ==
All tracks are written by Curtis Mayfield.

No.	Title	Length
1.	"Love Me (Right in the Pocket)"	7:20
2.	"So You Don't Love Me"	5:50
3.	"A Prayer"	4:06
4.	"Mother's Son"	6:04
5.	"Cannot Find a Way"	7:04
6.	"Ain't No Love Lost"	3:27
Total length:		33:51

Reissue edition bonus track
No.	Title	Length
7.	"Mother's Son" (Single Edit)	3:31

== Personnel ==
Credits adapted from liner notes.

- Joseph "Lucky" Scott – bass
- Rich Tufo – keyboards, arrangements
- Floyd Morris - Organ
- Quentin Joseph – drums
- Henry Gibson – congas
- Curtis Mayfield – all vocals, second guitar, production
- Gary Ray Thompson – lead guitar & solos

Technical

- Curtis Mayfield - producer
- Roger Anfinsen – engineering
- Milton Sincoff – creative packaging design
- William S. Harvey – cover design, painting

== Charts ==
Chart	Peak position
US Billboard 200	76
US Top R&B/Hip-Hop Albums (Billboard)	17
