= Curtis/Live! =

Live album by Curtis Mayfield
- Released: May 1971
- Recorded: January 1971
- Venue: Paul Colby's The Bitter End, New York City
- Genre: Funk, soul
- Length: 68:05 (original); 75:17 (2000 reissue/Rhino)
- Label: Curtom
- Producer: Curtis Mayfield

Curtis Mayfield chronology
Curtis (1970)	Curtis/Live! (1971)	Roots (1971)

Curtis/Live! is Curtis Mayfield’s first live album, after leaving the Impressions. Originally released in May 1971 as a double LP on Mayfield's Curtom label (distributed through Neil Bogart's Buddah Records), the album's 16 tracks — along with Mayfield's interstitial raps on the politics of the day — were recorded at Paul Colby's 230 seater Bitter End nightclub in New York City. According to John Abbey, who at the beginning of the 1970s was editor of the UK magazine Blues & Soul, Mayfield and his band's first set at a Bitter End date in January 1971 comprised the bulk of the music presented here. Mixed primarily with Eddie Kramer at Electric Lady Studios, the album features "Master" Henry Gibson playing percussion, Craig McMullen on rhythm guitar, Joseph "Lucky" Scott on bass, and Tyrone McCullen on drums.

== Release ==
Curtis/Live! was released in May 1971.

== Reception ==
Professional ratings
Review scores
Source	Rating
Tom Hull – on the Web	B+

The album was poorly received by Jon Landau when first released; in a contemporary review for Rolling Stone, Landau felt that Mayfield was "confusing his strengths with his weaknesses", and was writing pretentious and embarrassing lyrics, and that his high voice didn't work well when singing solo. Retrospective reviews have been more enthusiastic: Bruce Eder for AllMusic asserting it is "one of the greatest concert albums ever cut on a soul artist, and one of the legendary live albums of all time".

== Influence ==
Paul Weller, a long-standing fan of Mayfield's work, named the album as "one of his ten all-time favorites" in a 1992 interview with Record Collector. The rappers Jay-Z and Kanye West sampled the live version of "The Makings of You" on the deluxe track "The Joy" from their 2011 collaboration album, Watch the Throne.

== Track listing ==
All songs written by Curtis Mayfield except where noted.

Side one

1. "Mighty Mighty (Spade and Whitey)" – 6:56 (from the Impressions The Young Mods' Forgotten Story - 1969)
2. Rap – 0:26
3. "I Plan to Stay a Believer" – 3:16 (first release)
4. "We're a Winner" – 4:47 (from the Impressions We're a Winner - 1968)

Side two

1. Rap – 0:51
2. "We've Only Just Begun" (Paul Williams, Roger Nichols) – 3:44 (first release by Curtis Mayfield)
3. "People Get Ready" – 3:47 (from the Impressions People Get Ready - 1965)
4. Rap – 0:34
5. "Stare and Stare" – 6:12 (first release)

Side three

1. "Check Out Your Mind" – 3:53 (from the Impressions Check Out Your Mind! - 1970)
2. "Gypsy Woman" – 3:48 (from the Impressions The Impressions - 1963)
3. "The Makings of You" – 3:28 (from Curtis Mayfield Curtis - 1970)
4. Rap – 2:01
5. "We the People Who are Darker Than Blue" – 6:46 (from Curtis Mayfield Curtis - 1970)* A later live recording is incorrectly used in both the Spotify and Apple Music versions of the album.

Side four

1. "(Don't Worry) If There's a Hell Below, We're All Going to Go" – 9:27 (from Curtis Mayfield Curtis - 1970)
2. "Stone Junkie" – 8:05 (first release)

2000 Rhino reissue bonus tracks

1. "Superfly" – 3:56
2. "Mighty Mighty (Spade and Whitey)" (Single Version) – 3:16

== Personnel ==
- Curtis Mayfield - guitar, vocals
- Craig McMullen - guitar
- Joseph "Lucky" Scott - bass
- Tyrone McCullen - drums
- Henry Gibson - percussion, congas, bongos

== Chart positions ==
Billboard Music Charts (North America) - album

Year	Chart	Chart position
1971	Pop Albums	21
1971	Black Albums	3
1971	Jazz Albums	9
