= Sweet Exorcist =

Sweet Exorcist may refer to:

- Sweet Exorcist (album), sixth studio album by Curtis Mayfield, released in 1974
- Sweet Exorcist (band), a British band project by Richard H. Kirk and Richard Barratt
