= MySoul =

mySOUL

Studio album by jacksoul
- Released: June 20, 2006
- Recorded: at Metalworks Studios in Mississauga, Ontario
- Genre: R&B/soul

Jacksoul chronology
| Resurrected (2004) | ''mySOUL'' (2006) | SOULmate (2009) |

mySOUL is the fourth album by Canadian R&B/soul band jacksoul, released in 2006. The album comprises mainly covers of rock, pop and soul songs, although it also includes one original song by jacksoul singer and songwriter Haydain Neale.

MySoul debuted at #32 on the Canadian Albums Chart. The album won the Juno Award for R&B/Soul Recording of the Year at the Juno Awards of 2007, the band's second win of that award.

== Track listing ==
1. "oneSONG" (Neale)
2. "My Ever Changing Moods" (Weller)
3. "Superfly" (Mayfield)
4. "Love T.K.O." (Noble/Womack/Womack)
5. "Ashes to Ashes" (Bowie)
6. "Try" (Keelor/Cuddy)
7. "These Eyes" (Cummings/Bachman)
8. "Been Caught Stealing" (Navarro/Avery/Farrell/Perkins)
9. "High and Dry" (Greenwood/O'Brien/Greenwood/Selway/Yorke)
10. "Pieces of Me" (Simpson/Shanks/DioGuardi)
11. "It's Over" (Gould/King/Badarou)
12. "Knock on Wood" (Floyd/Cropper)
13. "1979" (Corgan)
14. "A Change Is Gonna Come" (Cooke)
