= Sig Shore =

American film producer

- Born: May 13, 1919; East Harlem
- Died: August 17, 2006 (aged 87); Stamford
- Alma mater: George Washington University
- Occupation: Film director, film producer, producer

Sig Shore (May 13, 1919 – August 17, 2006) was an American film director and producer. His 1972 film Super Fly is considered one of the first blaxploitation films.

== Biography ==
Shore was born in East Harlem, New York and grew up in The Bronx. He attended George Washington University on a basketball scholarship, but left school during World War II to serve in the United States Army Air Force, rising to the rank of first lieutenant.

After the war he worked as an advertising director for Dance magazine. Shore got his start in the film industry importing dubbed foreign films. One of these films, Ilya Muromets (retitled The Sword and the Dragon), was mocked in a 1994 episode of Mystery Science Theater 3000. Other foreign titles that Shore imported include Black Jesus, The 400 Blows, and Hiroshima Mon Amour..

Shore's biggest hit was 1972's Super Fly, directed by Gordon Parks Jr. Filmed on a budget of only US$300,000, it later made over US$30,000,000, and helped spawn the blaxploitation craze of the 1970s. Shore directed as well as produced the less-successful 1990 sequel, The Return of Superfly.

Another well-known film by Shore was That's the Way of the World (1975) about the music business, featuring Harvey Keitel and also R&B/funk group Earth, Wind and Fire, appearing as a fictionalized version of themselves.

Shore spent his last years in Stamford, Connecticut. He died from pulmonary complications and respiratory failure due to chronic pneumonia. At the time of his death he was in negotiations with Warner Bros. to produce a remake of Super Fly.

== Personal life ==
Shore was married to Barbara Shore for 59 years. She died of a stroke on December 6, 2006.
