= Greased Lightning (1977 film) =

1977 US biographical film by Michael Schultz

- VHS cover
- Directed by: Michael Schultz
- Written by: Leon Capetanos; Lawrence DuKore; Melvin Van Peebles; Kenneth Vose
- Produced by: Hannah Weinstein
- Starring: Richard Pryor; Beau Bridges; Pam Grier; Cleavon Little; Vincent Gardenia; Richie Havens
- Cinematography: George Bouillet
- Edited by: Randy Roberts; Bob Wyman
- Music by: Fred Karlin
- Production company: Third World Cinema
- Distributed by: Warner Bros. Pictures
- Release date: July 1, 1977
- Running time: 96 minutes
- Country: United States
- Language: English

Greased Lightning is a 1977 American biographical film starring Richard Pryor, Beau Bridges, and Pam Grier, and directed by Michael Schultz. The film is based loosely on the true life story of Wendell Scott, the first Black NASCAR race winner and later a 2015 NASCAR Hall of Fame inductee.

== Plot ==
In 1930s Danville, Virginia, a young African-American boy named Wendell Scott impresses local white boys with his bike-riding skills. Fifteen years later, after serving in World War II, Wendell returns home to a warm family welcome and quickly falls for Mary Jones. Though expected to work at the cotton mill, Wendell dreams of independence—buying a taxi, opening a garage, and, ultimately, becoming a champion racecar driver. While dating Mary, he reveals his passion for racing, though her family doubts him. Wendell proposes at an abandoned racetrack, and the couple soon marries, but financial struggles strain their new life.

Seeking income, Wendell turns to bootlegging, working for Slack alongside his best friend, Peewee, while evading Sheriff Cotton. Mary disapproves, but Wendell insists it is the only way to achieve his dream of owning a garage. Five years later, Slack is arrested, and Wendell is caught in a setup. The local racetrack owner, Billy Joe Byrnes, offers a deal: if Wendell competes in a stock car race, most charges will be dropped. Promoted as the first black driver, Wendell endures aggressive sabotage from white racers but crosses the finish line, winning his freedom and discovering his calling.

Determined to race, Wendell repairs his car with help from Woodrow, a skilled mechanic he meets at a junkyard. Mary is opposed to his new path, but Wendell presses on despite widespread racial barriers. In his early races, he earns fourth place and prizes like steak dinners at whites-only restaurants, where a sympathetic white driver, Hutch, befriends him. When Hutch's car fails during a later race, he joins Wendell's team as a mechanic.

In 1955, Wendell competes against rival Beau Welles at Middle Virginia Speedway, winning a close race but being denied the trophy due to a scoring error. Though officials quietly admit the mistake, Wendell's frustration grows as systemic prejudice blocks his recognition. Encouraging Hutch to join bigger teams for financial stability, Wendell continues his climb through regional circuits.

Wendell eventually reaches NASCAR's Grand National division, competing at premier tracks across the country, including Daytona and Talladega. By 1965, he becomes a local celebrity, with Sheriff Cotton—now running for mayor—seeking Wendell's support. A serious crash at Talladega leads Mary to beg him to retire, but Wendell remains undeterred. Preparing for a major upcoming race, he reunites with old friends, including Hutch, who leaves Beau Welles’ garage to rejoin Wendell's crew, inspired by his persistence.

Back in Danville, Cotton, now mayor, works to secure sponsorships so Wendell can compete with the top teams. On race day, Wendell fears Mary will not attend, but she arrives just before the start. In a tense final showdown against Welles, Wendell makes a pit stop but rushes his crew, leaving with only three lug nuts secured on one tire. Over the last 20 laps, he races aggressively despite the wobbling wheel. On the final lap, Wendell overtakes Welles, claiming his first NASCAR victory. Surrounded by his cheering family and friends, Wendell celebrates the culmination of his lifelong dream.

== Cast ==
- Richard Pryor as Wendell Scott
- Beau Bridges as Hutch
- Pam Grier as Mary
- Cleavon Little as "Peewee"
- Vincent Gardenia as Sheriff Cotton
- Richie Havens as Woodrow
- Julian Bond as Russell
- Earl Hindman as Beau Welles
- Minnie Gentry as Wendell's Mother
- Lucy Saroyan as Hutch's Wife
- Bill Cobbs as Mr. Jones
- Noble Willingham as Billy Joe Byrnes

== Production ==
Greased Lightning was filmed partially in Winder, Georgia; Athens, Georgia at the former Athens Speedway; Madison, Georgia; and Middle Georgia Raceway in Byron, Georgia. Richie Havens provided the soundtrack.

Pryor and co-star Cleavon Little had previously worked on Mel Brooks' Blazing Saddles in 1974, with Pryor co-writing the screenplay and Little playing the starring role of Sheriff Bart, a role that Brooks had initially wanted to cast Pryor in before 20th Century Fox refused to approve Pryor's casting (reportedly citing his history of drug-related arrests).

In actuality, Scott's one victory in a NASCAR Grand National Series race occurred in 1963 when it was found hours after the race was over that Scott had finished first while lapping the field (2nd place Buck Baker had been believed to be the winner). Scott did not get the trophy but received the money.

== Reception ==
Frederick I. Douglass of the Baltimore Afro American gave the picture a good review, writing Pryor and Grier demonstrated "considerable abilities" in their performances.

== See also ==
- Stock car racing
