= Aaron Loves Angela =

1975 film

- Directed by: Gordon Parks Jr.
- Written by: Gerald Sanford
- Produced by: Robert Anderson; Morton J. Mitosky; Lloyd S. Gilmour Jr.
- Starring: Moses Gunn; Kevin Hooks; Irene Cara
- Music by: José Feliciano
- Distributed by: Columbia Pictures
- Release date: December 25, 1975
- Running time: 100 minutes
- Country: United States
- Language: English

Aaron Loves Angela is a 1975 American comedy-drama film written by Gerald Sanford and directed by Gordon Parks Jr. It stars Moses Gunn, Kevin Hooks and Irene Cara.

== Plot ==
A modern adaptation of William Shakespeare's Romeo and Juliet, the film deals with the struggles of living in Harlem and intercultural divides in the 1970s. Two teenagers living in the slums of New York City are deeply in love with each other. Angela is a Puerto Rican girl who lives in Spanish Harlem with her mother. She falls in love with Aaron, a young Black basketball player. Their intercultural relationship is not approved by either of their parents, and they soon find out that the same prejudice is shared by their friends and neighbors. They rebel by meeting in secret, yet soon find themselves in danger.

== Cast ==
- Moses Gunn as Ike
- Kevin Hooks as Aaron
- Irene Cara as Angela
- Robert Hooks as Beau
- Ernestine Jackson as Cleo
- Leon Pinkney as Willie
- Wanda Velez as Carmen
- Lou Quinones as Mike
- Charles McGregor as Duke
- José Feliciano (cameo appearance)
- Walt Frazier (cameo appearance)
- Andre La Corbiere as Ricardo
- Norman Evans as Security Cop
- Alex Stevens as Gino
- William Graeff Jr. as Tony

== Soundtrack ==
Angela

Soundtrack album by José Feliciano
- Released: March 30, 1976
- Recorded: November, 1975
- Genres: Pop; jazz
- Length: 33:52
- Label: Private Stock
- Producer: José Feliciano

José Feliciano chronology
| Just Wanna Rock'n'Roll (1975) | Angela (1976) | Sweet Soul Music (1977) |

The soundtrack, composed by José Feliciano and Janna Marlyn Feliciano, was released as the José Feliciano album Angela for Private Stock Records. Forty years after being recorded, in 2016, the soundtrack was re-released for the first time for digital stores.

Track listing

| No. | Title | Performer(s) | Length |
|---|---|---|---|
| 1. | "Angela" | José Feliciano | 6:22 |
| 2. | "Sweet Street" | José Feliciano | 2:43 |
| 3. | "I've Got Feeling" | José Feliciano | 4:10 |
| 4. | "Nirvana Part 1 & Part 2" | José Feliciano | 7:31 |
| 5. | "Why?" | José Feliciano | 3:24 |
| 6. | "Michaelangelo" | José Feliciano | 3:36 |
| 7. | "Salsa Negra" | José Feliciano | 5:17 |
| 8. | "As Long as I Have You" | José Feliciano | 6:31 |

Notes

- Not included on the album but in the movie were: "What I Wanna Do" (performed by José Feliciano) and "Wilfull Strut". Both these songs were used as B-sides of the singles "Angela" and "Why".
- In Latin countries, the single "Angela" included the same song sung in Spanish on the B-side, same version in Spanish was also part of the LP in those Latin countries like first song of b-side

== See also ==
- List of American films of 1975
