= There's No Place Like America Today =

Studio album by Curtis Mayfield
- Released: May 1975
- Studios: Curtom, Chicago, Illinois
- Genres: Soul; funk
- Length: 35:23
- Label: Curtom
- Producer: Curtis Mayfield

Curtis Mayfield chronology
Got to Find a Way (1974)	There's No Place Like America Today (1975)	Let's Do It Again (with the Staple Singers) (1975)

Singles from There's No Place Like America Today
- 1. "So in Love / Hard Times" Released: 1975; 2. "Love to the People / Only You Babe" Released: 1975

There's No Place Like America Today is the seventh studio album by American soul musician Curtis Mayfield, released in 1975 on Curtom Records. It peaked at number 120 on the Billboard 200 chart, as well as number 13 on the Soul LPs chart.

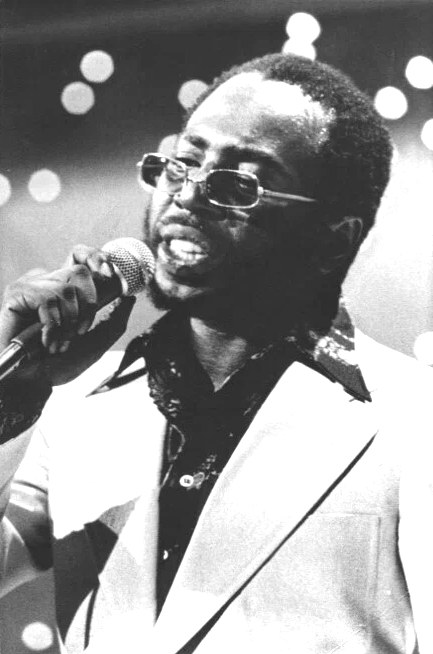
Mayfield in 1973

== Album cover ==
The album cover was based on a 1937 monochrome photograph by Margaret Bourke-White, titled At the Time of the Louisville Flood, on which the advertising slogan was "There's No Way Like the American Way". The original photograph was published in the February 15, 1937, issue of Life.

== Critical reception ==
Professional ratings
Review scores
Source	Rating
AllMusic	4/5 stars
Christgau's Record Guide	D+
Paste	10/10

The album was featured in 1001 Albums You Must Hear Before You Die. In 2013, NME placed it at number 373 on the "500 Greatest Albums of All Time" list.

== Track listing ==
All tracks are written by Curtis Mayfield.

No.	Title	Length
1.	"Billy Jack"	6:10
2.	"When Seasons Change"	5:28
3.	"So in Love"	5:15
4.	"Jesus"	6:13
5.	"Blue Monday People"	4:50
6.	"Hard Times"	3:45
7.	"Love to the People"	4:07
Total length:		35:23

Reissue edition bonus track
No.	Title	Length
8.	"Hard Times" (Long Version)	3:57

== Personnel ==
Credits adapted from liner notes.

- Curtis Mayfield – vocals, guitar, keyboards, production
- Rich Tufo – keyboards, arrangement
- Gary Thompson – guitar
- Phil Upchurch – guitar
- Joseph "Lucky" Scott – bass guitar
- Quinton Joseph – drums
- Henry Gibson – percussion
- Harold Dessent – woodwinds
- Roger Anfinsen – engineering
- Ed Thrasher – art direction
- Peter Palombi – illustration
- Lockart – design

== Charts ==
Chart	Peak position
US Billboard 200	120
US Top R&B/Hip-Hop Albums (Billboard)	13
