= On and On (Gladys Knight & the Pips song) =

Single by Gladys Knight & the Pips

from the album Claudine
- B-side: "The Makings of You"
- Released: April 1974
- Genre: Soul
- Length: 3:20
- Label: Buddah
- Songwriter: Curtis Mayfield
- Producer: Curtis Mayfield

Gladys Knight & the Pips singles chronology
"Best Thing That Ever Happened to Me" (1974)	"On and On" (1974)	"Between Her Goodbye and My Hello" (1974)

"On and On" is a song written by Curtis Mayfield and made famous by Gladys Knight & the Pips for the film Claudine. This song was first recorded by the Impressions in 1972 as "Our Love Goes On and On". However, Mayfield changed some of the lyrics and re-recorded it with Gladys Knight & the Pips in 1974.

Gladys Knight & the Pips' version reached #2 on the U.S. R&B chart, #5 on the U.S. pop chart, and #13 on the Canadian pop chart in 1974. It was featured on their 1974 soundtrack album Claudine.

The song was arranged by Richard Tufo and produced by Curtis Mayfield.

The song was nominated for the Golden Globe Award for Best Original Song in 1974, but lost to "I Feel Love" by Charlie Rich.

The song ranked #69 on Billboard magazine's Top 100 singles of 1974.

== Other versions ==
- Mayfield released a version of the song as the B-side to his 1990 single "Got to Be Real".
