= A Tribute to Curtis Mayfield =

Compilation album by Various artists
- Released: February 22, 1994
- Recorded: November 1992 – September 1993
- Genres: Rock, R&B, soul
- Length: 1:15:39
- Label: Warner Bros.
- Producers: Ron Weisner (exec.), Marv Heiman (exec.) Attala Zane Giles, Gladys Knight, Steve Winwood, Daniel Wyatt, Gary Katz, Genji Siraisi, Lenny Kravitz, Narada Michael Walden, Louis Biancaniello, Bruce Springsteen, Tommy Sims, Nile Rodgers, Angela Winbush, Branford Marsalis, Arif Mardin, Stewart Levine, Patrick Leonard, Phil Collins, Stevie Wonder, L.A. Reid, Tony Rich

Professional ratings
Review scores
Source	Rating
Allmusic	3/5 stars

A Tribute to Curtis Mayfield is a compilation album of various artists, celebrating the music of Curtis Mayfield. While many tribute albums are recorded after an artist has passed, this album was completed five years before Mayfield's death.

== Track listing ==
All songs written by Curtis Mayfield except "Amen", by Mayfield and John W. Pate Sr.

1. "Choice of Colors" – Gladys Knight – (3:52)
2. "It's All Right" – Steve Winwood – (4:21)
3. "Let's Do It Again" – Repercussions and Curtis Mayfield – (4:55)
4. "Billy Jack" – Lenny Kravitz – (6:18)
5. "Look Into Your Heart" – Whitney Houston – (3:54)
6. "Gypsy Woman" – Bruce Springsteen – (3:34)
7. "You Must Believe Me" – Eric Clapton – (4:28)
8. "I'm So Proud" – The Isley Brothers – (4:57)
9. "Fool for You" – Branford Marsalis and The Impressions – (3:45)
10. "Keep On Pushin'" – Tevin Campbell – (3:21)
11. "The Makings of You" – Aretha Franklin – (4:26)
12. "Woman's Got Soul" – B.B. King – (3:49)
13. "People Get Ready" – Rod Stewart – (5:01)
14. "(Don't Worry) If There's a Hell Below, We're All Going to Go" – Narada Michael Walden – (5:09)
15. "I've Been Trying" – Phil Collins – (5:01)
16. "I'm the One Who Loves You" – Stevie Wonder – (3:58)
17. "Amen" – Elton John and Sounds of Blackness – (4:41)

== Personnel ==
1. "Choice of Colors"

- Gladys Knight – lead vocals
- Voncille Faggotte, Jackie Simley Kee and Reggie Burrell – backing vocals

2. "It's All Right!"

- Steve Winwood – lead vocals, piano, organ, bass, guitar
- Jim Capaldi – drums, backing vocals

3. "Let's Do It Again"

Repercussions:

- Nicole "Bubba Diva" Willis – lead and backing vocals
- Gordon "Nappy G." Clay – timbales, bongos, percussion
- Andy Faranda – guitar
- Jonathan Maron – bass guitar
- Genji Siraisi – drums
- Daniel "Chief Abbott D." Wyatt – congas

With:

- Curtis Mayfield – lead and backing vocals
- Paul Griffin – piano, organ, clavinet
- Scott Barkham – Fender Rhodes
- Dave Bargeron – trombone
- Randy Brecker – trumpet
- Lou Soloff – trumpet
- Lou Marini – tenor and alto saxophone, flute

4. "Billy Jack"

- Lenny Kravitz – drums, bass guitar, acoustic and electric guitars
- Craig Ross – electric guitar
- Henry Hirsch – mellotron strings

5. "Look Into Your Heart"

- Whitney Houston – lead vocals
- Louis "Kingpin" Biancaniello – keyboards, drum programming, Moog bass
- Narada Michael Walden – magic tambourine
- Claytoven Richardson, Sandy Griffith and Annie Stocking – backing vocals

6. "Gypsy Woman"

- Bruce Springsteen – acoustic guitar, vocals
- Tommy Sims – keyboards, Hammond B-3, bass guitar, percussion
- Jerry McPherson – guitar
- Dann Huff – guitar
- Danny Duncan – MIDI programming

7. "You Must Believe Me"

- Eric Clapton – guitar, lead vocals
- Nile Rodgers – guitar
- Sterling Campbell – drums
- Barry Campbell – bass guitar
- Richard Hilton – keyboards
- John Powe, Shawn Powe, Demetrius Peete and John Clay – backing vocals

8. "I'm So Proud"

- Ronald Isley – vocals
- Ernie Isley – guitar
- Angela Winbush-Isley – synthesizers, keyboards, drum programming

9. "Fool for You"

- Branford Marsalis – tenor and soprano saxophones
- Kenny Kirkland – piano
- Tony Maiden – guitar
- Matt Finders – trombone
- Sal Marquez – trumpet

10. "Keep On Pushin'"

- Tevin Campbell – lead vocals
- Narada Michael Walden – drums
- Frank "Killer Bee" Martin – keyboards
- Vernon "Ice" Black – wah-wah guitar
- Stef Burns – guitar
- Myron Dove – bass guitar
- Clayoven Richardson, Skyler Jett, Tony Lindsay and Dooney Jones – backing vocals

Horn section:

- Wayne Wallace – trombone
- Robbie Kwock – trumpet
- Melecio Magdaluyo – saxophone
- Ron Stallings – saxophone
- Martin Wehner – trombone
- Louis Fasman – trumpet

11. "The Makings of You"

- Aretha Franklin – lead vocals
- Robbie Kondor – keyboards
- David Spinoza – guitar
- Will Lee – bass guitar
- Anton Fig – drums
- Joe Mardin – percussion, synthesizers
- Andy Snitzer – alto saxophone

12. "Woman's Got Soul"

- B.B. King – lead guitar, vocals
- Joe Sample – piano
- Neal Larsen – organ
- Arthur Adams – guitar
- Freddie Washington – bass guitar
- Alvino Bennett – drums
- Kevin Ricard – percussion
- Arnold McCuller, Sweet Pea Atkinson and Sir Harry Browns – backing vocals

Tower of Power Horn Section:

- Doc Kupka – baritone saxophone
- Emilio Castillo – tenor saxophone
- David Mann – tenor saxophone
- Greg Adams – trumpet
- Lee Thornburg – trumpet

13. "People Get Ready"

- Rod Stewart – vocals, banjo
- Ronnie Wood – guitar
- Carmine Rojas – bass guitar
- Jeff Golub – guitar
- Charles Kentiss III – piano, organ
- Kevin Savigar – piano, organ, accordion
- Jim Cregan – guitar
- Don Teschner – guitar, violin, mandolin
- Phil Parapiano – accordion, mandolin
- Dorian Holly, Darryl Phinessee and Fred White – backing vocals

14. "(Don't Worry) If There's a Hell Below, We're All Going to Go"

- Narada Michael Walden – vocals, drums
- Louis "Kingpin" Biancaniello – synth strings
- Mike "$" Mani – keyboards
- Vernon "Ice" Black – lead guitar
- Stef Burns – rhythm guitar
- Myron Dove – bass guitar
- Michael Carabello – percussion

Horn section:

- Wayne Wallace – trombone
- Robbie Kwock – trumpet
- Melecio Magdaluyo – saxophone
- Ron Stallings – saxophone
- Martin Wehner – trombone
- Louis Fasman – trumpet

15. "I've Been Trying"

- Phil Collins – vocals, all instruments

16. "I'm the One Who Loves You"

- Stevie Wonder – lead vocals, all instruments
- Terence Trent D'Arby, Johnny Gill, Kenny Greene, Clinton "Buddy" Wike, and Jeff Sanders – backing vocals

17. "Amen"

- Elton John – lead vocals
- Sounds of Blackness – backing vocals
- "L.A." Reid – drums, percussion
- Tony Rich – keyboards
- Kayo – bass guitar
- Riko Marable – organ

== Charts ==
=== Weekly charts ===
Chart (1994)	Peak position
US Billboard 200	56
US Top R&B/Hip-Hop Albums (Billboard)	17

=== Year-end charts ===
Chart (1994)	Position
US Top R&B/Hip-Hop Albums (Billboard)	83
