= Roots (Curtis Mayfield album) =

Studio album by Curtis Mayfield
- Released: October 1971
- Recorded: RCA, Chicago, Illinois
- Genres: Progressive soul; deep funk
- Length: 39:15
- Label: Curtom
- Producer: Curtis Mayfield

Curtis Mayfield chronology
Curtis/Live! (1971)	Roots (1971)	Super Fly (1972)

Professional ratings
Review scores
Source	Rating
AllMusic	4.5/5 stars
Christgau's Record Guide	B−
The New Rolling Stone Album Guide	4/5 stars
Rolling Stone (1971)	(unfavorable)
Rolling Stone (1999)	(favorable)
Tom Hull – on the Web	A−

Roots is the second studio album by American soul musician Curtis Mayfield, released in October 1971. Having received critical praise from a variety of publications, the album is regarded as not just one of Mayfield's best works but also as a classic release of the '70s soul era, with AllMusic critic Bruce Eder stating that "the album soars on some of the sweetest and most eloquent... soul sounds heard up to that time". The album peaked at No. 6 on Billboard's Top R&B Albums chart.

== Track listing ==
=== Original release ===
All songs written and composed by Curtis Mayfield, except as noted.

1. "Get Down" – 5:45
2. "Keep On Keeping On" – 5:08
3. "Underground" – 5:15
4. "We Got to Have Peace" – 4:44
5. "Beautiful Brother of Mine" – 7:23
6. "Now You're Gone" (Mayfield, Joseph Scott) – 6:50
7. "Love to Keep You in My Mind" – 3:48

=== Bonus tracks ===
In 1999, Rhino Records re-released the album with four bonus tracks including a demo version of "Underground" and single edits for "Get Down", "We Got to Have Peace", and "Beautiful Brother of Mine".

1. "Underground" (demo version) – 3:17
2. "Get Down" (single edit) – 3:55
3. "We Got to Have Peace" (single edit) – 3:39
4. "Beautiful Brother of Mine" (single edit) – 3:09

== Personnel ==
- Curtis Mayfield - vocals, guitar
- Craig McMullen - guitar
- Joseph "Lucky" Scott - bass
- Tyrone McCullen - drums
- Henry Gibson - percussion
- Leroy Hutson, Michael Hawkins - background vocals
- Johnny Pate, Riley Hampton - arrangements

== Chart positions ==
Chart (1971)	Peak position
US Billboard Top LPs	40
US Billboard Top Soul LPs	6
