= Look Into Your Heart =

1976 single by Aretha Franklin

Single by Aretha Franklin

from the album Music from the Warner Bros. Picture "Sparkle"
- B-side: "Rock with Me"
- Released: 1977
- Recorded: April 1976
- Studio: Curtom (Chicago, Illinois)
- Genre: Soul
- Length: 4:04
- Label: Atlantic
- Songwriter: Curtis Mayfield
- Producer: Curtis Mayfield

Aretha Franklin singles chronology
"Jump" (1976)	"Look Into Your Heart" (1977)	"Break It to Me Gently" (1977)

"Look Into Your Heart" is a song composed by American singer-songwriter, guitarist, and record producer Curtis Mayfield for the 1976 motion picture Sparkle. The song was first recorded by American singer Aretha Franklin, who released it as a single in early 1977 as the third official single from the soundtrack. Upon release, the mid-tempo soul song was a moderate hit for Franklin, peaking at number 82 on the Billboard Hot 100 and number 10 on the Hot R&B/Hip-Hop Songs chart. It was later covered in 1994 by American singer Whitney Houston for the Curtis Mayfield tribute album, A Tribute to Curtis Mayfield, and charted on several Billboard charts, including the Radio Songs and Adult R&B Songs charts.

== Aretha Franklin version ==
In the original 1976 film version of Sparkle, the song is first performed as a duet between Irene Cara and Philip Michael Thomas and later as a solo performance by Cara near the end of the film. The version featured in the soundtrack album replaces Cara and Thomas' vocals with that of Franklin and the Kitty Haywood Singers, while the instrumentation remained the same from the film.

The song becomes a solo breakthrough for Cara's character, Sparkle, as she ventured on a solo career following the death of her eldest sister, breaking up the sibling group, Sister & the Sisters, a 1960s Motown-esque girl group. Franklin's rendition was the third single release from the soundtrack after "Something He Can Feel" and "Jump" and became a top ten hit on Billboard's Hot Soul Singles chart and was a moderate hit on the Billboard Hot 100, peaking at number 82 on the chart, while reaching number 77 on the Canadian Singles chart.

It would be Franklin's penultimate top ten single on the R&B charts while still with Atlantic as after her next single, "Break It to Me Gently", peaked at number one, Franklin wouldn't reach the top ten again until "United Together" peaked at number three in 1980 on her first Arista Records release, Aretha.

=== Charts ===
Chart (1977)	Peak position
Canada (RPM Top 100)	77
US Billboard Hot 100	82
US Hot Soul Singles (Billboard)	10

== Whitney Houston version ==
"Look Into Your Heart"

Single by Whitney Houston

from the album A Tribute to Curtis Mayfield
- Released: 1994
- Recorded: 1993
- Studio: Tarpan Studios (San Rafael, CA)
- Genre: R&B; soul
- Length: 3:54
- Label: Warner Bros.
- Songwriter: Curtis Mayfield
- Producer: Narada Michael Walden

Whitney Houston singles chronology
"Something in Common" (1993)	"Look Into Your Heart" (1994)	"Exhale (Shoop Shoop)" (1995)

In 1994, American singer Whitney Houston covered the tune as tribute to Curtis Mayfield, who had become paralyzed from the neck down after stage lighting equipment fell on him while he was being introduced at an outdoor concert at Wingate Field in Flatbush in Brooklyn, New York on August 13, 1990.

A tribute album began to be worked on in late 1992 and recording would carry through 1993. Houston would record her rendition of "Look Into Your Heart" as her pick to pay tribute to Mayfield. It was notable as being the last collaboration Houston would have with longtime producer Narada Michael Walden, who produced the session.

Growing up, Houston was a fan of the original Sparkle film and of the accompanying soundtrack by Franklin. Later in 2011, Houston would begin serving as both a leading star and executive producer of a revived version of the 1976 film, that would be released after Houston's passing in 2012. Houston's rendition was a radio-only single in the US and managed to reach the Billboard charts, peaking at number 68 on the Radio Songs chart in March 1994, staying on the charts for two weeks. Its success was larger on Billboard's R&B radio charts, reaching number 50 on the Hot R&B/Hip-Hop Airplay chart where it stayed for 21 cumulative weeks. It reached its biggest peak on the Adult R&B Songs, where it peaked at number 36, staying on the chart for 3 cumulative weeks, becoming her second top 40 entry on that chart. Because it was only issued as a radio single, the song was ineligible from entering either the Billboard Hot 100 or the Hot R&B/Hip-Hop Songs charts. The song was ranked the 18th greatest Whitney Houston song by The Guardian in 2022, writing how despite the fact that Franklin had recorded the song, admitting "there's big shoes to fill" that Houston "does it with aplomb".

=== Charts ===
Chart (1994)	Peak position
US Adult R&B Songs (Billboard)	36
US R&B/Hip-Hop Airplay (Billboard)	50
US Radio Songs (Billboard)	68
