= Let's Do It Again (soundtrack) =

Soundtrack album by Curtis Mayfield and The Staple Singers
- Released: 1975
- Genre: Funk; Soul
- Label: Curtom
- Producer: Curtis Mayfield

Curtis Mayfield chronology
There's No Place Like America Today (1975)	Let's Do It Again (1975)	Sparkle (1976)

Singles from Let's Do It Again
- 1. "Let's Do It Again" Released: October 13, 1975

Professional ratings
Review scores
Source	Rating
AllMusic	3/5 stars
Christgau's Record Guide	D

Let's Do It Again is the Curtis Mayfield-penned and Staple Singers-performed soundtrack to the highly successful 1975 comedy film starring Sidney Poitier, Bill Cosby and Jimmie Walker. The title track hit number one on both the R&B and pop charts in the US. Gil Askey and Rich Tufo were responsible for the arrangements.

== Track listing ==
All tracks composed by Curtis Mayfield, except where indicated.

1. "Let's Do It Again"
2. "Funky Love"
3. "A Whole Lot of Love"
4. "New Orleans"
5. "I Want to Thank You"
6. "Big Mac"
7. "After Sex"
8. "Chase" (Quinton Joseph, Philip Upchurch, Gary Thompson, Floyd Morris, Joseph Scott, Mayfield)

== Personnel ==
- Floyd Morris, Rich Tufo - keyboards
- Curtis Mayfield, Gary Thompson, Phil Upchurch - guitars
- Quintin Joseph - drums
- Henry Gibson - congas, bongos
- Lucky Scott - bass

== See also ==
- List of number-one R&B albums of 1975 (U.S.)
