= Junius Griffin =

African American civil rights activist

Junius Griffin (January 13, 1929 – June 1, 2005) was an African American Civil Rights activist working as the President of the Beverly-Hills Hollywood chapter of the NAACP, who is best known for his work alongside Martin Luther King Jr. as well as for coining the term “Blaxploitation” in regard to the African American film industry of the 1970s.

== Early life ==
Junius Griffin was born in Stonega, Virginia, on January 13, 1929. Not much is known about Griffin's childhood, however by age 16 it is recorded that he decided to leave Stonega and go to Bluefield College in Virginia. After a short time there he found it not to be a good fit and decided to enlist in the United States Marine Corps. Though little is known of his social life during his 12 years in the Marines, there is a later record of his parents being happily involved in his later life.

== Career ==
When Griffin enlisted in the United States Marines, he worked as a journalist and became well known for his writing, working as the Taiwan Bureau Chief for the Stars and Stripes. Griffin's writing quickly became in high demand as he was one of the first black reporters for not only the Stars and Stripes, but also The Associated Press and The New York Times. Griffin served in the military for a total of 12 years.

During his time working for The New York Times, Griffin reported on the "Blood Brothers" gang as well as managed an interview with an unnamed member as many black journalists at the time were able to get closer to gang disputes than their white counterparts, however there is some dispute on the validity of these reports. Griffin alongside Caldwell and colleagues like Gerald Fraser, Austin Scott, Lester Carson, Ted Jones, Wallace Terry, Ted Poston, and Claude Lewis were all reporters who reported on situations from the front lines and often worked together comparing and sharing information to get the stories. Griffin worked as the Administrative Assistant Director of Public Relations, Minority Division of the Republican National Committee for 6 months when he was 38.

In 1966 Griffin, who had already been working closely with Martin Luther King Jr. as part of the Southern Christian Leadership Conference, gained the attention of Motown. He was hired initially for Motown Records of Detroit as an administrative assistant to President Berry Gordy and Vice president Esther Edwards, before later becoming the Director of Publicity at International Talent Management Inc. for Motown's commitment to public services, which primarily focused on black causes.

Later in 1970 Griffin assisted Coretta Scott King when establishing the Martin Luther King Jr. Center for Nonviolent Social Change. He also assisted in Scott King's endorsement of George McGovern during the Democratic National Convention held in 1972 by providing a Rolls-Royce Limousine.

Griffin was confirmed to have returned as President of the Beverly-Hills Hollywood Chapter of the NAACP in October 1972 after a brief hiatus in September.

After his time working at Motown, Griffin, alongside Ewart Abner, and George Schiffer, created and became the heads of a new label, known as “Black Forum Records” and shaped its political orientation, declaring it “A Medium for the presentation of ideas and voices of the worldwide struggle of Black people to create a new era." Also stating that it was meant to document and provide historical materials of Black history for use in both academics and home study, Black Forum Records strived to record civil-right era on vinyl.

One of the most well known additions to Black Forum's catalogue was the recording of Martin Luther King Jr.’s 1967 speech “Why I oppose the Vietnam War,” recorded then released in 1970 by Griffin. The label fell through in 1973 after its final album "Elaine Brown" as it was a spoken word catalogue and therefore did not move copies as fast as its music focused counterpart Motown. However the label was revived in 2021, and is now headed by Jamila Thomas of Blackout Tuesday.

== Controversy ==
Griffin is most well known for his renaming black power movies by coining the derogatory label blaxploitation, in his explanation of his distaste for the genre of movies prevailing from 1965 through to the 1980s (that Griffin believed 'ripped off' Blacks), and were "gnawing away at the moral fiber of our [the Black] community."

Black Power Movies were a genre of film made by African Americans, for African Americans, about African Americans, focusing on urban life and struggles, with popular entries including Sweet Sweetback's Baadasssss Song (1971), Super Fly (1972), Blacula (1972), Blackenstein (1973), and Detroit 9000 (1973) with which this movie specifically Griffin himself was the executive producer. The hypocrisy of this is noted by JET journalist William E. Berry, in JET's September 20, 1973 issue.

Griffin was a long-standing opposer labeling these films Blaxploitation as he believed they were a sign of abandonment of hope. Griffin went on record to say that the popularity and approval of Black power media was instead of entertainment was escapism. By allowing people to become copacetic to their situations they would stop trying to fight the broken systems, "This is counter-revolutionary because our leaders have always emphasized the importance of dealing with reality." He went on record declaring Black Producers as "Front men to white society," believing they perpetuated what 'White Society' wanted to see.

His label of Blaxploitation media was not accepted by opposing forces of "Made by Blacks, for Blacks, about Blacks," who showed depictions of Black heroes over-coming white adversary, and societal solidarity, and the insistence on morality pushed by the NAACP and CORE, believing movies like SuperFly and Sweet Sweetback's Baadasssss Song perpetuate harmful stereotypes that destroy the communities it was meant to represent. The battle was never fully decided, as movie audiences moved on and the label Blaxploitation movies became a niche even though black power movies were never called blaxploitation by the black community until the genre was renamed years later.

Griffin, despite his work with King, held a separatist view in a similar vein as Malcolm X. In 1967 while he still worked for the Republican National Committee Griffin spoke to Tennessee College professors about how African Americans would need to 'form a coalition' becoming separatist. Their views differ as Griffin believed they shouldn't become isolationist but stand independent as to then hold true representation in politics.

== Awards and recognition ==
Griffin received several awards throughout his career, including being nominated for a Pulitzer Prize for coverage of the civil rights struggle of 1963, and his work called “The Deepening Crisis” which is currently housed in the Appalachian Archives.

Griffin also won a Grammy for his role as recording producer of the vinyl recordings of Martin Luther King Jr.’s famous 1967 speech “Why I oppose the Vietnam War,” at the Ebenezer Baptist Church, Atlanta. with copies being released in 1970. Griffin accepted the award for “Best Spoken Word” at the 13th annual Grammy Awards ceremony; this would be Motown's second Grammy awarded and "Why I oppose the Vietnam War," was Black Forum's initial debut album in 1971.

In 1971 Griffin was recorded by JET Magazine driving an American Motors, 140-mph AMX-Javelin, which was considered a Hollywood staple elite car.

Griffin received a special citation from Coretta Scott King for his assistance in bringing the Jackson Five to Atlanta for the inaugurate annual memorial concert to honor her then late husband Martin Luther King Jr. His parents were in attendance as part of a celebration on Scott King's part for Griffin's birthday.

In 2008 he was of the inaugural inductees to the Southwest Virginia Walk of Fame at the Southwest Virginia Museum Historical State Park.

== Personal life ==
Not much is currently known about Griffin's early home life before the age of 16 when he enrolled in college, and predictably there is little record of his social life oversees, however, later in life when Junius was working as the executive of Motown, he met and married Ebony and JET Editor Ragni Lantz. They initially met through their connections to Martin Luther King Jr. where she was covering King's speeches and Griffin was the producer in charge of the recording of King's speech.

Griffin had reportedly 2 daughters with Lantz, one named Zenzi Griffin, who in 1993 graduated from Michigan State University with honors and a degree focused on cognitive psychology.

Griffin's second daughter is named Pamela Elizabeth, born October 29, 1972. Her birthday is significant because by sheer coincidence she shared a birthday with Diana Ross's daughter Tracee Joy as reported on by JET.

Later again in life Griffin and Lantz divorced for unknown reasons, separating in 1967 and being fully divorced in 1982 after a custody case over their daughters Zenzi (age 11) and Pamela (age 9). Griffin was represented by Attorney Melvin Belli and argued that their daughters had been raised black and would suffer from culture shock if forced to move to Sweden. After the divorce Lantz returned to Sweden to become the director of the Swedish Baptist Women's Union.

Griffin's parents were confirmed to be alive and involved in his life when attending his birthday in 1972.

== Death ==
Junius Griffin died June 1, 2005, in Beaufort County, South Carolina. He was buried in the Beaufort National Cemetery.

== Bibliography ==
Griffin, Junius. “Hollywood and the Black Community.” The Crisis: A Record of the Darker Races 80, no. 5, May 1973
