= (Don't Worry) If There's a Hell Below, We're All Going to Go =

Single by Curtis Mayfield

from the album Curtis
- B-side: "The Makings of You"
- Released: November 1970
- Recorded: 1970
- Genre: Psychedelic soul; acid funk; funk
- Length: 3:26 (single version); 7:50 (album version)
- Label: Curtom CR-1955
- Songwriter: Curtis Mayfield
- Producer: Curtis Mayfield

Curtis Mayfield singles chronology
| "(Don't Worry) If There's a Hell Below, We're All Going to Go" (1970) | "Move On Up" (1971) |

"(Don't Worry) If There's a Hell Below, We're All Going to Go" is a funk/soul song originally recorded by Curtis Mayfield for his album Curtis (1970). The song was meant to serve as a warning regarding the state of race relations and the tempest growing in America's inner cities.

== Summary ==
The song begins with a woman proclaiming the virtues of the Bible's "Book of Revelation" over an introduction of fuzz-bass guitar and conga drums. Mayfield then shouts out to the audience with a large echo overdub, saying "Don't worry, If there's a Hell below, we're all gonna go!" followed by a scream. The song then breaks out with a heavy fuzz bass, Latin percussion, wah-wah guitar and strings.

== Albums ==
The song is performed live on the album Curtis/Live! (1971) and Live in Europe (1987). Studio out-takes of the song have been added to the CD re-issue of the album.

== Charts ==
| Chart (1970–1971) | Peak position |
|---|---|
| U.S. Billboard Hot 100 | 29 |
| U.S. Billboard Hot Soul Singles | 3 |

== Covers and use ==
Punk rock band Antiseen have covered the song on their EP Hell. Narada Michael Walden performs this song on A Tribute To Curtis Mayfield.

The Afghan Whigs covered this song on their 1998 live EP Live at Howlin' Wolf.

D12 samples this song on "That's How" from their album Devil's Night. Kanye West samples the introduction to this song on "Jesus Walks", from his album The College Dropout. N.W.A also interpolates the introduction to this song on "Niggaz 4 Life" from their album Efil4zaggin.

The track was featured in the 1997 Girl Skateboards video Mouse.

The instrumental beginning was featured in season 2 episode 20 of Fresh Off the Boat entitled "Hi, My Name Is...".

The song was also featured in the 1995 film Dead Presidents.

In 2017, the song was used as the opening credits theme song for the first season of the HBO drama The Deuce.

The Detroit rapper and producer Black Milk released a 2014 album with the referential name If There's a Hell Below. He samples the song on "What It's Worth" from that album.
