= Curtis (Curtis Mayfield album) =

Studio album by Curtis Mayfield
- Released: September 1970
- Recorded: May–July 1970
- Studios: RCA, Chicago
- Genres: Progressive soul; psychedelic soul
- Length: 40:28
- Label: Curtom
- Producer: Curtis Mayfield

Curtis Mayfield chronology
Curtis (1970)	Curtis/Live! (1971)

Singles from Curtis
- 1. "(Don't Worry) If There's a Hell Below, We're All Going to Go" Released: November 1970; 2. "Move On Up" Released: June 1971

Curtis is the debut studio album by American soul musician Curtis Mayfield, released in September 1970. Produced by Mayfield, it was released on his own label Curtom Records. The musical styles of Curtis moved further away from the pop-soul sounds of Mayfield's previous group The Impressions and featured more of a funk and psychedelic-influenced sound. The album's subject matter incorporates political and social concerns of the time.

Curtis sold well at the time charting at number one on the Billboard Black albums (for five nonconsecutive weeks) and number nineteen on the Billboard Pop albums charts. Only the single "(Don't Worry) If There's a Hell Below, We're All Going to Go" charted in the United States; however, an edited version of "Move On Up" would spend 10 weeks in the top 50 of the UK Singles Chart.

In 2020, the album was ranked at number 275 on Rolling Stone's 500 greatest albums of all time list.

== Background ==
Mayfield began work on his own self-titled album in 1970. Although he never intended to leave the Impressions permanently, he would officially leave them in 1971, under recommendation from his business manager Marv Stuart and given the trend for both R&B and rock artists to go solo.

== Recording and production ==
Like with some of his later Impressions work, Mayfield's lyrics reflected the social and political concern rising in black America at the time. Mayfield was one of the earliest artists to speak openly about African-American pride and community struggle. Mayfield reflected upon this time as a "happening era...when people stopped wearing tuxedos...people were getting down a little more."

The album had a more hard edged sound than the Impressions had before. On this new sound Mayfield claimed it was something he "long wanted to do...but were out of category of what was expected of me and the Impressions. What I got off in the Curtis album allowed me to be more personal for myself.". The two singles off the album "(Don't Worry) If There's a Hell Below, We're All Going to Go" and "Move On Up" showcased Mayfield's new funk musical style, while the rest of the tracks were much softer soul based songs. Not having any traditional music lessons, Mayfield claimed his backing band would occasionally comment "gosh, this is a terribly strange key to play in", but still played it accordingly as written. According to Joseph L. Tirabassi of Tiny Mix Tapes, "We the People Who Are Darker Than Blue" exemplified the "gliding soul" and "hard-hitting funk" the rest of the album veered between.

== Critical reception ==
Professional ratings
Review scores
Source	Rating
AllMusic	5/5 stars
Christgau's Record Guide	B+
The Encyclopedia of Popular Music	3/5 stars
Q	5/5 stars
Rolling Stone	4/5 stars
The Rolling Stone Album Guide	3.5/5 stars
Tom Hull – on the Web	A−
The Village Voice	B

In a contemporary review for Rolling Stone, John Wendell was disappointed by Curtis, finding much of Mayfield's music more rhythmic than melodic, "fragmentary, garbled and frustrating to listen to"; he called the lyrics haphazardly written and mealy-mouthed. "He tries to deal with some pretty serious and complex subjects by stringing together phrases that end with the same sound—whether they make sense together or not", Wendell critiqued. "Sure, it's all subjective, but I can't myself see that what we need is 'Respect for the steeple/power to the people.'" The Village Voice critic Robert Christgau was also somewhat unmoved by the album's "essentially middle-class guides to black pride" but qualified his judgment as reflecting a certain degree of cultural relativism on his part, making note of African-American audiences having embraced the record. In the British publication Blues & Soul, John Abbey described the reception of the album in the United States as being "the most exciting project since Isaac Hayes' Hot Buttered Soul" and that it was "certainly one of the most creative and personal albums that I've heard in a long time." Finding it "more progressive musically than anything that Curtis ever did with the Impressions." Abbey commented that "In the States, Curtis is sometimes misunderstood and even considered by some to be a racialist. In truth, he is the complete opposite because every one of his political songs pleads and cries for togetherness as opposed to segregation."

Christgau revisited Curtis in Christgau's Record Guide: Rock Albums of the Seventies (1981) and found it far less middlebrow on further listens; later in Rolling Stone, he said the album is song-for-song "stronger than Superfly". Bruce Eder from AllMusic said Mayfield had "embraced the most progressive soul sounds of the era" on an album that was "practically the Sgt. Pepper's album of '70s soul". While regarding Mayfield's first four albums as forming a timeless, "politically conscious, progressive-soul tetralogy", PopMatters critic Charles Donovan said Curtis has "eight lengthy, politically conscious, progressive soul songs, some easy to connect with, others more challenging and requiring multiple listens", while noting its frequent presence in critics' best album lists. In The Rolling Stone Album Guide (2004), Geoffrey Himes wrote that the songs remained irresistibly catchy, even though sometimes Mayfield's messages were oversimplified and the production sounded excessively "ornate". Treblezine names it among the 10 essential albums of psychedelic soul.

== Awards ==
In 1972, Mayfield won the Prix Otis Redding (best R&B album) from the Académie du Jazz for Curtis.

== Cover ==
The song "We People Who Are Darker Than Blue" has been covered by the British rock band Babe Ruth on their third album Babe Ruth.

== Track listing ==
All tracks are written by Curtis Mayfield.

Side one
No.	Title	Length
1.	"(Don't Worry) If There's a Hell Below, We're All Going to Go"	7:50
2.	"The Other Side of Town"	4:01
3.	"The Makings of You"	3:43
4.	"We the People Who Are Darker Than Blue"	6:05

Side two
No.	Title	Length
1.	"Move On Up"	8:45
2.	"Miss Black America"	2:53
3.	"Wild and Free"	3:16
4.	"Give It Up"	3:49
Total length:		40:28

All songs written and composed by Curtis Mayfield except where noted.

2000 Remaster bonus material
No.	Title	Writer(s)	Length
9.	"Power to the People" (demo version)		2:47
10.	"Underground" (demo version)		3:11
11.	"Ghetto Child" (demo version)		5:10
12.	"Readings in Astrology" (demo version)		3:31
13.	"Suffer" (demo version)	Donny Hathaway, Mayfield	2:31
14.	"Miss Black America" (demo version)		2:22
15.	"The Makings of You" (backing tracks, take 32)		4:35
16.	"(Don't Worry) If There's a Hell Below, We're All Going to Go" (backing tracks, takes 1 & 2)		9:34
17.	"(Don't Worry) If There's a Hell Below, We're All Going to Go" (radio edit)		3:26
Total length:			77:53

== Charts ==
Chart (1970)	Peak position
US Billboard Top Pop LPs	19
US Billboard Top Soul LPs	1

Singles

Year	Title	Peak position		
Year	Title	US Pop	US R&B	UK
1970	"(Don't Worry) If There's a Hell Below, We're All Going to Go"	29	3	—
1971	"Move On Up"	—	—	12

== Personnel ==
- Musicians – Leonard Druss, John Howell, Harold Lepp, Loren Binford, Clifford Davis, Patrick Ferreri, Richard Single, Rudolph Stauber, Donald Simmons, Robert Lewis, Harold Dessent, Ronald Kolber, Harold Klatz, John Ross, Sol Bobrob, Sam Heiman, Elliot Golub, Henry Gibson, Robert Sims, Gary Slabo, Philip Upchurch

Technical personnel

- Riley Hampton and Gary Slabo – producer, mixer
- R.J. Anfinson and Tom Flye – recording engineer
- Curtis Mayfield – producer

== See also ==
- List of number-one R&B albums of 1971 (U.S.)

== Notes ==
=== Sources ===
- Abbey, John (September 1970). "Curtis Mayfield: Curtis; The Impressions: Check Out Your Mind". Blues & Soul – via Rock's Backpages.
