= Claudine (film) =

1974 film by John Berry

- Original theatrical poster.
- Directed by: John Berry
- Written by: Lester Pine; Tina Pine
- Produced by: Hannah Weinstein
- Starring: Diahann Carroll; James Earl Jones
- Cinematography: Gayne Rescher
- Edited by: Louis San Andres
- Music by: Curtis Mayfield
- Production company: Third World Cinema Corporation
- Distributed by: 20th Century Fox
- Release date: April 22, 1974
- Running time: 92 minutes
- Country: United States
- Language: English
- Budget: $1.1 million
- Box office: $6 million

Claudine is a 1974 American romantic comedy-drama film, directed by John Berry. Claudine was written by Lester Pine and Tina Pine, produced by Third World Cinema, and distributed by 20th Century Fox, starring James Earl Jones, Diahann Carroll, and Lawrence Hilton-Jacobs. The film was released on April 22, 1974, grossing about $6 million, a modest hit for the times. It was praised for showing a new dimension in black cinema during the height of blaxploitation.

== Plot ==
The film tells the story of Claudine Price, a single black Harlem mother, living on welfare with six children, who finds love with a garbage collector, Rupert "Roop" Marshall. The pair's relationship is complicated by their poverty, the restrictions of the welfare system and the hostility of her children, particularly eldest son Charles, who believes that Roop will leave their mother just like her previous husbands had. When Rupert is invited inside Claudine's shabby apartment, the children are rude and vulgar towards him.

Throughout the film, Miss Kabak, a social worker, visits Claudine at her home and asks her if she is employed and if she is dating anyone. Claudine always claims to be unemployed and single, to make sure to get the maximum amount of benefits, which she desperately needs. If Claudine has a job or dates anyone and receives gifts from her boyfriend, the social worker has to deduct any money or gifts from her benefits, forcing Claudine to lie. Having a husband would be even worse, and cause her to lose her benefits altogether. Claudine does have a job as a housekeeper, but her meager wages will not support the family without the welfare benefits. Adding to Claudine's stress and financial woes, her teenage daughter Charlene gets pregnant by a young man with no prospects for taking care of her or a baby.

Despite these problems, Claudine and Roop's relationship continues and the children warm up to him. Just before he is to announce his engagement to Claudine to the kids, Rupert is served papers for a court order relating to underpayment of child support of his own children; his work wages are garnished to pay the difference. Rupert is so upset that he disappears for a couple of days and loses contact with everyone. He moves out of his apartment, does not show up to work, and does not show up to the Father's Day celebration the children had prepared for him. Charles eventually finds Roop drunk at a bar and confronts him. Charles is angry at Rupert because he left his mother without any explanation and the two get into a scuffle at the bar. Later, Rupert shows up outside of Claudine's apartment, explains his absence and they reconcile.

After several hardships and debating the financial issues relating to welfare, the couple decide to marry. In the middle of the wedding, Charles runs inside the apartment with the police chasing after him for his activities at a political demonstration. The couple and the rest of the children run after Charles, leaving the ceremony, and board the police wagon. The film ends on a cheery note with the entire family, along with Rupert, walking happily hand in hand through the neighborhood.

== Cast ==
- Diahann Carroll as Claudine Price
- James Earl Jones as Rupert "Roop" B. Marshall
- Lawrence Hilton-Jacobs as Charles Price (as Lawrence Hilton-Jacques)
- Tamu Blackwell as Charlene Price
- David Kruger as Paul Price
- Yvette Curtis as Patrice Price
- Eric Jones as Francis Price
- Socorro Stephens as Lurlene Price
- Adam Wade as Owen
- Elisa Loti as Miss Kabak
- Roxie Roker as Mrs. Winston

== Main characters ==
- Claudine Price is played by Diahann Carroll. Claudine is a loving, 36-year-old single mother of six children. She cannot raise her children without the help of the welfare program. Her children are Charles, Charlene, Paul, Patrice, Francis, and Lurlene. Claudine had been married and abandoned twice and dated two men before she meets Rupert. She lives in a small, run-down apartment in Harlem, New York. Claudine works as a housekeeper for a wealthy, older, white woman who does not seem to like Claudine very much and pays her very poorly. Claudine eventually dates Rupert, and toward the end of the movie, they get married.
- Rupert B. Marshall is played by James Earl Jones. Rupert is a cheery garbage collector who lives alone in his apartment. He meets Claudine when he stops at the house where Claudine works to pick up the garbage. He has several children from two previous marriages. He never gets to see his children but he does provide them with as much financial support as his low-paying job allows. With time, he gains the respect and attention of Claudine's children and they finally decide to accept him into their family.
- Charles Price is Claudine's oldest son and is played by Lawrence Hilton-Jacobs. Charles is a member of a black activist group that fights for positive social change for the black community. Charles disapproves of his mother's relationship with Rupert because he thinks that Rupert will get Claudine pregnant and simply leave her, as his own father and others have done. Charles does not even consider the younger children his siblings because he hates the fact that Claudine had several children with different men. Therefore, one day, he confesses to his horrified mother that he has had a vasectomy because he does not want to procreate and be stuck in a situation similar to his mother's.
- Charlene Price is Claudine's older daughter and is played by Tamu Blackwell. Claudine erupts with violence when she discovers her daughter is concealing her pregnancy, beating her with her fists and a hairbrush. Claudine is crushed that Charlene has fallen into the same trap of early pregnancy that has diminished her own life. But her disappointment is soon replaced by compassion and determination to do what is best for her daughter.

== Themes ==
=== Welfare and employment ===
In the film, Claudine receives financial aid from state welfare. She receives barely enough money to provide basic necessities for herself and her six children, living in a slum-like neighborhood in Harlem. Claudine works as a housekeeper for an upper-middle class white woman but conceals this so that her benefits will not be reduced. The constant struggle of a family living in poverty is a major theme throughout the movie.

=== Marriage and family life ===
Claudine is forced to choose between the benefits her family desperately needs and her desire to form a new family with Roop. She chooses to be a single mother because of the rules of the government's financial aid programs such as the Aid to Families with Dependent Children (AFDC). Marriage will bring love and stability to herself and her family, but also will mean that her current income will be reduced below what they need. This is a major theme in the movie, which shows that, despite the stereotypes of a "Welfare Queen", this mother is neither lazy nor promiscuous but rather navigating a difficult situation.

=== Systemic economic inequality ===
The third theme that occurs in the film is welfare and the black community as a whole. The welfare system, sometimes handled comically, sometimes seriously, is a constant topic of conversation in the movie. Even Claudine's younger children are aware of what welfare is and ask Rupert if he receives assistance. The one person, other than Rupert, who clearly opposes the welfare system is Charles, Claudine's oldest son. Charles is a member of an activist group promoting social justice for black people. Even though he understands that women like his mother face a severe struggle to break free from poverty and dependency, Charles opposes the welfare system because he believes it encourages passivity and discourages self-reliance. Charles believes in the creation of more job opportunities for black people so that they can earn money and leave the welfare system.

== Production ==
=== Filming ===
Production for the film began in August 1973. The location of this film was in the Harlem area Sugar Hill; Claudine's apartment was located near Edgecombe Avenue and 142nd street. The final shot of Claudine and her family walking together with Rupert was filmed several weeks after principal photography ended. Actor Ivan Dixon of Hogan's Heroes and Car Wash fame can be seen toward the end of the film in the crowd that follows Claudine as she hops into the police truck. He is wearing a red shirt. Dixon was a long time friend of Diahann Carroll and James Earl Jones.

=== Casting ===
Actress Diana Sands was originally cast as Claudine, but after only a week of filming, Sands fell ill and was not able to continue. Just before her death, Sands called Carroll and insisted that she take the role in her place. Cicely Tyson also turned down the role of Claudine.

=== Soundtrack ===
Curtis Mayfield wrote and produced the film's score and soundtrack, the vocals for which are performed by Gladys Knight & the Pips. The soundtrack for Claudine was released on Buddah Records, the group's record label, and "On & On", the film's theme song, was a #5 hit for Knight and the Pips on the Billboard Pop Singles Chart in 1974.

== Reception ==
=== Box office ===
The film earned $3 million in North America.

=== Critical response ===
On Rotten Tomatoes it has a 67% rating, based on 9 reviews. Vincent Canby of The New York Times wrote that while "not very far removed from a typical TV sitcom ... 'Claudine' is a first-rate American comedy that gives stature to a popular form. The difference between it and dozens of television comedies is the difference between interests, to say nothing of talents. It is also the first major film about black life to consider the hopes, struggles, defeats and frustrations of blacks who aren't either supercops, supermusicians, superstuds, superpimps or superpushers." Gene Siskel of the Chicago Tribune gave the film 3 stars out of 4 and wrote, "Carroll and Jones are accomplished players and provide the story with life and believability. Theirs is a funny and tender encounter; there's no way you can help but want them to stay together." Charles Champlin of the Los Angeles Times called it "an engrossing and effective movie which is somehow able to exist simultaneously as a high-spirited romantic comedy and as a fictionalized documentary grim and angering in its implications." Penelope Gilliatt of The New Yorker declared it "a sweet-spirited film, saddened and rollicking, full of courage." Gary Arnold of The Washington Post praised Jones for "a playful, winning performance" but found the film "a mishmash of situation and romantic comedy, domestic and romantic melodrama, and rather grand standing social commentary, with the action interrupted in order to permit one character or another to get a position paper off the writers' chests." Tom Milne of The Monthly Film Bulletin criticized the film for what he called "its patronising blacks-are-really-just-like-us attitude," stating, "Substitute white actors for the black cast, tone down the fashionably outspoken situations a little, and it would be just like one of those perennial Disney movies about happy families and the difficulty of living and loving in this problematic world."

=== Accolades ===
Award	Category	Nominee(s)	Result
Academy Awards	Best Actress	Diahann Carroll	Nominated
Golden Globe Awards	Best Actor in a Motion Picture – Musical or Comedy	James Earl Jones	Nominated
Golden Globe Awards	Best Actress in a Motion Picture – Musical or Comedy	Diahann Carroll	Nominated
Golden Globe Awards	Best Original Song – Motion Picture	"On and On"; Music and Lyrics by Curtis Mayfield	Nominated
NAACP Image Awards	Outstanding Actor in a Motion Picture	James Earl Jones	Won
NAACP Image Awards	Outstanding Actress in a Motion Picture	Diahann Carroll	Won
Writers Guild of America Awards	Best Comedy – Written Directly for the Screen	Lester Pine and Tina Pine	Nominated

== Home media ==
Claudine was released on DVD on January 14, 2003. On October 13, 2020, The Criterion Collection released the film on Blu-ray and DVD, touting a new 4K restoration of the film.

== See also ==
- List of American films of 1974
- Claudine - soundtrack album with songs performed by Gladys Knight & the Pips, written and produced by Curtis Mayfield
