= Sparkle (1976 soundtrack) =

1976 soundtrack album by Aretha Franklin

Music from the Warner Bros. Picture "Sparkle"

Soundtrack album by Aretha Franklin
- Released: June 1, 1976
- Recorded: April–May 1976
- Studios: Curtom Studios (Chicago, Illinois)
- Genres: R&B; soul
- Length: 33:07
- Label: Atlantic
- Producer: Curtis Mayfield

Aretha Franklin chronology
You (1975)	Music from the Warner Bros. Picture "Sparkle" (1976)	Sweet Passion (1977)

Curtis Mayfield chronology
Let's Do It Again (1975)	Sparkle (1976)	Give, Get, Take and Have (1976)

Music from the Warner Bros. Picture "Sparkle" is a soundtrack album and twenty-fourth studio album by American singer Aretha Franklin, written and produced by Curtis Mayfield. Released on June 1, 1976, the disc is the soundtrack album for the 1976 Warner Bros. motion picture Sparkle, starring Irene Cara. The songs on the soundtrack feature the instrumental tracks and backing vocals from the film versions, with Franklin's voice taking the place of the original lead vocalists.

This album returned Franklin to Gold status after two low-selling albums With Everything I Feel in Me (1974) and You (1975). The first single release, "Something He Can Feel", was a No. 1 R&B hit for her and reached No. 28 on the Billboard Hot 100. However, it was Aretha's only pop Top 40 hit during the second half of the 1970s. "Something He Can Feel" was nominated for the Grammy Award for Best R&B Vocal Performance, Female at the 19th Annual Grammy Awards in 1977. The album itself reached the Top 20 of the Billboard 200 album chart and was certified Gold for US sales of over 500,000 copies. In 2009, it was reissued on Rhino Records' budget Flashback Records label. The songs "Something He Can Feel" and "Hooked on Your Love" were covered by En Vogue on their 1992 multi-platinum hit album Funky Divas while "Look Into Your Heart" was covered in 1994 by Whitney Houston, who later co-starred in a 2012 revival of the original film.

Professional ratings
Review scores
Source	Rating
Allmusic	4/5 stars
Christgau's Record Guide	B
Rolling Stone	(not rated)

== Original LP release ==
All tracks are written by Curtis Mayfield.

Side one
No.	Title	Length
1.	"Sparkle"	4:13
2.	"Something He Can Feel"	6:21
3.	"Hooked on Your Love"	5:00
4.	"Look Into Your Heart"	4:04

Side two
No.	Title	Length
5.	"I Get High"	4:11
6.	"Jump"	2:19
7.	"Loving You Baby"	3:48
8.	"Rock with Me"	3:11

== Charts ==
Chart (1976)	Peak position
U.S. Billboard 200	18
U.S. Billboard Top R&B Albums	1

Singles

Year	Single	Chart	Position
1976	"Something He Can Feel"	Billboard Hot 100	28
1976	"Something He Can Feel"	Hot Soul Singles	1
1976	"Jump"	Billboard Hot 100	72
1976	"Jump"	Hot Soul Singles	17
1977	"Look Into Your Heart"	Billboard Hot 100	82
1977	"Look Into Your Heart"	Hot Soul Singles	10

- Curtis Mayfield, Phil Upchurch, Gary Thompson - guitars
- Rich Tufo, Floyd Morris - keyboards
- Donnell Hagan - drums
- Henry Gibson - congas, cowbell
- Lucky Scott - bass

== See also ==
- List of number-one R&B albums of 1976 (U.S.)
