= Three the Hard Way (film) =

1974 film by Gordon Parks, Jr.

- Original poster
- Directed by: Gordon Parks Jr.
- Written by: Eric Bercovici; Jerry Ludwig
- Produced by: Harry Bernsen
- Starring: Jim Brown; Fred Williamson; Jim Kelly; Sheila Frazier; Charles McGregor; Alex Rocco
- Cinematography: Lucien Ballard
- Edited by: Robert Swink
- Music by: Richard Tufo
- Production company: Allied Artists Pictures Corporation
- Distributed by: Allied Artists Pictures Corporation
- Release date: June 26, 1974
- Running time: 97 minutes
- Country: United States
- Language: English

Three the Hard Way is a 1974 blaxploitation action film directed by Gordon Parks Jr., written by Eric Bercovici and Jerrold L. Ludwig, and starring Fred Williamson, Jim Brown, and Jim Kelly.

== Plot ==
Jimmy Lait (Brown) and his girlfriend, Wendy, come across Jimmy's friend, House, wounded and dying. Lait learns from House that he had escaped from a secret medical experimentation facility. Later in the hospital, a delirious House tells Lait that there is someone who aims to "kill us all" and that they have a way of doing it. However, Lait has to return to the studio to supervise a recording session with a group he is producing, The Impressions. He leaves Wendy in the hospital.

While Wendy talks to Jimmy on the phone outside of the room, two men climb through the window, murder House and kidnap Wendy. After finding out about her kidnapping, Jimmy begins a quest to find the whereabouts of his girlfriend, but a group of attackers ambush him. Lait survives with the help of his friend, Jagger Daniels (Williamson). Lait and Daniels join up with Mister Keyes (Kelly, named "Mister" by his mother so people would be forced to show him respect) after he wins a fist fight with several police officers attempting to plant drugs in his car.

Lait is shot as they capture a member of the mysterious gang, but are unable to force him to give up his secrets. Jagger calls three dominatrixes: The Countess (Pamela Serpe), The Empress (Irene Tsu), and The Princess (Marie O'Henry). The eager women ask Jagger if they can go all the way, meaning, torturing the captured man to death. Jagger tells them, only after the prisoner gives him the information he seeks. They agree and proceed to go upstairs to torture the tied up man.

The three women at first excite their captive by baring their breasts, but that's because they work up quite a sweat as they torture him. After some time the women emerge, and say the captive is ready to talk. He informs them (before dying from his torture) that there is a secret plot of black genocide concocted by the nefarious Monroe Feather (Jay Robinson), the leader of a secret Neo-Nazi, white supremacist organization. Their chief scientist, Dr. Fortrero (Richard Angarola), has developed a lethal poison that only affects African Americans. They plan to deploy the serum into the water systems of Washington, D.C., Detroit, and Los Angeles, in order to wipe out their black populations.

The three heroes reunite as Lait is leaving the hospital, and decide to stop the poisoning of the water supplies. "Three the hard way, three cities, the three of us."

Lait returns to Los Angeles. Mister Keyes stops the poisoning in Washington, D.C., as Jagger does in Detroit. They reunite again to stop Feather and arm themselves to the teeth. They raid Feather's compound and rescue Wendy after a huge shootout, leaving Dr. Fortrero burned alive, and Feather and many white supremacists dead.

== Cast ==
- Jim Brown as Jimmy Lait, Record Producer
- Fred Williamson as Jagger Daniels, Chicago Businessman
- Jim Kelly as Mr. Keyes, Martial Artist
- Sheila Frazier as Wendy Kane, Kidnapped Girlfriend of Jimmy Lait
- Jay Robinson as Monroe Feather, Head of White Supremacist Group
- Charles McGregor as Charlie
- Howard Platt as "Keep"
- Richard Angarola as Dr. Fortero
- David Chow as "Link"
- Marian Collier as Eva
- Jean Bell as Polly
- Junero Jennings as "House"
- Alex Rocco as Lieutenant Di Nisco
- Corbin Bernsen as Boy
- Renie Radich as Girl
- Janice Carrol as Nurse
- Irene Tsu as The Empress

== Reception ==
On the review aggregator website Rotten Tomatoes, 44% of 9 critics' reviews are positive.

== Effects on popular culture ==
The plot of Three The Hard Way has been copied and parodied. I'm Gonna Git You Sucka (1988) includes a gag where Jim Brown, in a supporting role, never reloads his gun, same as the characters he and Williamson play in Three the Hard Way. In Undercover Brother (2002), Eddie Griffin portrays a soulful crime-fighting vigilante who must stop the white-run "Man" before he destroys the black population of the United States through an ingested toxin. Also, the Man's second in command (Chris Kattan) is named Mr. Feathers after Monroe Feather from Three The Hard Way.

The Beastie Boys reference the title of this film in the song 3 The Hard Way on their 2004 album To the 5 Boroughs, where they sample LL Cool J's "El Shabazz" from 1985's Radio. 3rd Bass also reference the title of this film in the chorus of their song Wordz Of Wizdom from their 1989 album The Cactus Album.

== Soundtrack ==
Performed by Curtis Mayfield's former group The Impressions, the soundtrack featured the songs "That's What Love Can Do" and "Three the Hard Way" plus "Make a Resolution".

== See also ==
- List of American films of 1974
