= Third World Cinema =

American film company

The Third World Cinema Corporation was a company formed to promote film roles for actors of color.

== History ==
Seeking independence from the constraints of Hollywood, Ossie Davis started the company in 1972, and soon produced two successful films: Greased Lightning, starring Richard Pryor, and Claudine (1974), with Diahann Carroll in the lead actress role for which she received her Academy Award for Best Actress nomination.

== Criteria ==
Third World Cinema had two main objectives: to provide training for actors of color to find roles in film and television and to help create films produced and directed from minority perspectives. Most of the initial funding came from Federal grants, including $200,000 and $400,000 grants from the U. S. Manpower and Career Development Administration and the Model Cities program respectively. Third World went on to train many of the technicians who would go on to work on other films made by actors of color since the 1980s.

== See also ==
- L.A. Rebellion-alternative African-American cinema in the 1970s
- Working class culture
- 1970s in film
