= Curtis in Chicago =

Live album by Curtis Mayfield
- Released: 25 September 1973
- Genre: Funk, soul
- Label: Curtom
- Producer: Rich Tufo, Roger Anfinsen

Curtis Mayfield chronology
Back to the World (1973)	Curtis in Chicago (1973)	Claudine (1974)

Professional ratings
Review scores
Source	Rating
Allmusic	4.5/5 stars

Curtis in Chicago is a 1973 live album by Curtis Mayfield and others. Mayfield is joined by The Impressions, Jerry Butler, Gene Chandler and others in a review of Mayfield's then-fifteen years as a recording artist.

== Track listing ==
All tracks written and composed by Curtis Mayfield unless otherwise noted.

1. "Superfly" - Curtis Mayfield
2. "For Your Precious Love" (Arthur Brooks, Richard Brooks, Jerry Butler) - Curtis Mayfield, Jerry Butler and The Impressions
3. "I'm So Proud" - The Impressions
4. "For Once in My Life" (Orlando Murden, Ronald Miller) - The Impressions
5. "Preacher Man" - The Impressions
6. "If I Were Only a Child Again" - Curtis Mayfield
7. "Duke of Earl" (Gene Chandler, Earl Edwards, Bernice Williams) - Gene Chandler
8. "Love Oh Love" (Janice Hutson, Leroy Hutson, Michael Hawkins) - Leroy Hutson
9. "Amen" (Mayfield, Johnny Pate) - Curtis Mayfield, Gene Chandler, Leroy Hutson and The Impressions
