= Freddie's Dead =

1972 song by Curtis Mayfield

"Freddie's Dead (Theme From Superfly)"

Single by Curtis Mayfield

from the album Super Fly
- B-side: "Underground"
- Released: July 1972
- Recorded: 1972
- Genre: Funk; soul
- Length: 3:17 (single edit); 5:27 (album version)
- Label: Curtom/Buddah; CR-1975
- Songwriter: Curtis Mayfield
- Producer: Curtis Mayfield

Curtis Mayfield singles chronology
"We Got to Have Peace" (1972)	"Freddie's Dead (Theme From Superfly)" (1972)	"Superfly" (1972)

"Freddie's Dead" is a song by Curtis Mayfield. It was the first single from his 1972 soundtrack album for the film Super Fly. The single was released before the Super Fly album, and before the film was in theaters. The song peaked at #4 on the U.S. Billboard Hot 100 and #2 on the R&B chart. Billboard ranked it as the No. 82 song for 1972.

The song laments the death of Fat Freddie (Charles McGregor), a character in the film who is run over by a car. Like most of the music from the Super Fly album, "Freddie's Dead" appears in the film only in an instrumental arrangement, without any lyrics. The song's music is featured prominently in the film's opening sequence and also recurs at several other points. Because of this usage the song was subtitled "Theme from Superfly" on its single release (but not on the album). It is not to be confused with "Superfly", a different song and the second single released from the Super Fly album. The arrangement is driven by a strong bass line, wah wah guitars and a melancholy string orchestration.

The song was nominated for a Grammy Award in the category Grammy Award for Best Rhythm & Blues Song at the 15th Annual Grammy Awards but lost to "Papa Was a Rollin' Stone" by The Temptations. "Freddie's Dead" was ruled ineligible for the Academy Award for Best Original Song at the 45th Academy Awards because its lyrics are not sung in the film Super Fly.

== Chart history ==
=== Weekly charts ===
Chart (1972)	Peak position
Canada RPM Top Singles	14
U.S. Billboard Hot 100	4
U.S. Billboard R&B	2
U.S. Cash Box Top 100	6

=== Year-end charts ===
Chart (1972)	Rank
U.S. Billboard Hot 100	82

== Covers and parodies ==
- MFSB's 1973 self-titled album features an instrumental cover of the song.
- "Freddie's Dead" was sampled in the 1973 John & Ernest break-in record, "Super Fly Meets Shaft" (US #31).
- The 1988 Fishbone album Truth and Soul features a cover of the song.
- The title of the 1991 horror film Freddy's Dead: The Final Nightmare is a reference to the song.
- Master P recorded "Kenny's Dead", a parody of Mayfield's song for the television show South Park, featuring the character Kenny McCormick (Matt Stone), for Chef Aid: The South Park Album.

== See also ==
- 1972 in music
