= You (Aretha Franklin album) =

1975 studio album by Aretha Franklin

Studio album by Aretha Franklin
- Released: October 16, 1975
- Recorded: June–September, 1975
- Studio: Whitney Studios, (Glendale, California)
- Genre: R&B; disco; pop
- Length: 43:36
- Label: Atlantic
- Producer: Jerry Wexler; Aretha Franklin

Aretha Franklin chronology
With Everything I Feel in Me (1974)	You (1975)	Sparkle (1976)

Singles from You
- 1. "Mr D.J. (5 for the D.J.)" Released: June 10, 1975; 2. "You" Released: October 20, 1975; 3. "It Only Happens (When I Look at You)" Released: January 1976

Professional ratings
Review scores
Source	Rating
AllMusic	2/5 stars
Christgau's Record Guide	B−
The Encyclopedia of Popular Music	2/5 stars
Rolling Stone	negative
The Rolling Stone Album Guide	1/5 stars

You is the twenty-second studio album by American singer Aretha Franklin, released on October 16, 1975, by Atlantic Records.

== Background ==
It was a commercial disappointment, stalling at number 83 on Billboard's album chart. The album's only pop chart single, "Mr. D.J.", peaked at number 53 on Billboard's Hot 100, while climbing to only number 13 R&B. The title track, issued as the follow-up, reached number 15 R&B. The album brought an end to Aretha's collaboration with Atlantic producer Jerry Wexler, who signed her to the label in late 1966, and headed up production on all but one of her albums from 1967-1975.

== Critical reception ==
The Guardian named "Mr. D.J. (5 for the D.J.)" one of Franklin's "30 Greatest Songs", and called it "a horn and call-and-response vocal-laden strut that defies anyone in earshot not to dance."

Rolling Stone called the album "supper-club soul." While praising Franklin's genius as undiminished, it felt the songs were about "mush, not hurt, not pain, not joy or ecstasy or even the mystical wonderment that seemed somehow wrenched from Aretha's soul," and considered the melodies "undistinguished."

== Track listing ==
1. "Mr. D.J. (5 for the D.J.)" (Aretha Franklin) - 4:25
2. "It Only Happens (When I Look at You)" (Ken Gold, Michael Denne) - 4:23
3. "I'm Not Strong Enough To Love You Again" (Frank Johnson) - 4:16
4. "Walk Softly" (Van McCoy) - 4:48
5. "You Make My Life" (Bettye Crutcher, Frederick Knight) - 4:15
6. "Without You" (Randy Stewart, Mack Rice) - 5:13
7. "The Sha-La Bandit" (Jerry Ferguson, Wade Davis) - 4:00
8. "You" (Jerry Butler, Marvin Yancy, Randy Stewart) - 4:40
9. "You Got All The Aces" (Ronnie Shannon) - 3:52
10. "As Long As You Are There" (Carolyn Franklin) - 3:44

== Personnel ==
=== Performance ===
- Aretha Franklin – lead vocals
- Clarence McDonald, Sylvester Rivers – keyboards
- Jay Graydon, Ray Parker Jr., Lee Ritenour, David T. Walker – guitar
- Scott Edwards, Tony Newton – bass guitar
- Ed Greene – drums
- Gary Coleman – percussion
- Bobbye Hall – congas
- Jim Horn – flute (2)
- Bud Brisbois – trumpet (2)
- Tom Scott – saxophone (6)
- Ernie Watts – saxophone (7)
- Gene Page – arrangements
- Harry Bluestone – concertmaster of string section
- Margaret Branch – backing vocals
- Brenda Bryant – backing vocals
- Cissy Houston – backing vocals
- Pam Vincent – backing vocals

=== Production ===
- Producers – Aretha Franklin and Jerry Wexler
- Engineer – Frank Kejmar
- Assistant Engineer – Steve Hall
- Mixing – Aretha Franklin and Dave Hassinger
- Mix Assistant – Jim Nipar
- Copyist – George Annis
- Cover Photo – Norman Dugger
