= Back to the World (Curtis Mayfield album) =

Studio album by Curtis Mayfield
- Released: May 1973
- Studio: Curtom, Chicago, Illinois
- Genre: Progressive soul
- Length: 36:11
- Label: Curtom
- Producer: Curtis Mayfield

Curtis Mayfield chronology
Super Fly (1972)	Back to the World (1973)	Curtis in Chicago (1973)

Singles from Back to the World
- 1. "Future Shock / The Other Side of Town" Released: 1973; 2. "If I Were Only a Child Again / Think (Instrumental)" Released: 1973; 3. "Can't Say Nothin' / Future Song (Love a Good Woman, Love a Good Man)" Released: 1973; 4. "Kung Fu / Right On for the Darkness" Released: 1974

Professional ratings
Review scores
Source	Rating
AllMusic	3/5 stars
Christgau's Record Guide	C
Rolling Stone	favorable

Back to the World is the fourth studio album by Curtis Mayfield, released in 1973 under Curtom Records. It peaked at number 16 on the Billboard 200 chart, as well as number 1 on the Top R&B Albums chart.

== Track listing ==
All tracks are written by Curtis Mayfield.

No.	Title	Length
1.	"Back to the World"	6:48
2.	"Future Shock"	5:24
3.	"Right On for the Darkness"	7:30
4.	"If I Were Only a Child Again"	2:53
5.	"Can't Say Nothin'"	5:20
6.	"Keep on Trippin'"	3:16
7.	"Future Song (Love a Good Woman, Love a Good Man)"	5:00
Total length:		36:11

Reissue edition bonus track
No.	Title	Length
8.	"Can't Say Nothin'" (Single Edit)	3:35

== Personnel ==
- Curtis Mayfield – guitar, vocals
- Phil Upchurch – guitar
- Joseph "Lucky" Scott – bass
- Rich Tufo – keyboards, organ, arrangements
- Henry Gibson – congas, percussion
- Quinton Joseph – drums

Credits adapted from liner notes.

- Curtis Mayfield – production
- Roger Anfinsen – engineering
- Glen Christensen – art direction
- Gary Wolkowitz – illustration
- Milton Sincoff – packaging

== Charts ==
=== Weekly charts ===
Chart (1973)	Peak position
US Billboard 200	16
US Top R&B/Hip-Hop Albums (Billboard)	1

=== Year-end charts ===
Chart (1973)	Position
US Billboard 200	88
US Top R&B/Hip-Hop Albums (Billboard)	20

== See also ==
- List of Billboard number-one R&B albums of 1973
