= Soulmate (album) =

Studio album by Jacksoul
- Released: December 1, 2009
- Genre: R&B/soul
- Length: 35:56
- Label: Sony Music Canada
- Producer: Haydain Neale, Ron Lopata

Jacksoul chronology
mySOUL (2006)	Soulmate (2009)

Soulmate is the fifth and final album by Canadian R&B/soul band Jacksoul, released in 2009. It was released shortly after the death of Haydain Neale. All proceeds from the sales of the album go to the Haydain Neale Family Trust. The song "Lonesome Highway" won R&B/Soul Recording of the Year at the Juno Awards of 2010.

== Track listing ==
1. "Lonesome Highway"
2. "How We Do"
3. "All You Need"
4. "Lion Heart"
5. "This Is Heaven"
6. "911"
7. "I Surrender"
8. "It's You"
9. "Do It to Me"
10. "You're Beautiful"
