= Charles McGregor =

American actor

- Born: September 1, 1922; New York City, New York, United States
- Died: August 11, 1996 (aged 73); Santa Clara, California, United States
- Occupation: Actor
- Years active: 1971–1977
- Spouse: Carolyn Pryor (1980–1996)

Charles McGregor (September 1, 1922 – August 11, 1996) was an American actor, best known for his role as Fat Freddie in Super Fly. McGregor served twenty-eight years in a number of state prisons for two murders. During the 1970s, he became an actor and played supporting roles in several blaxploitation films. After his film career, he toured the United States and went to junior high schools and high schools, counseling children on the dangers of crime, drugs and prison. In 1980, he married Carolyn Pryor. He wrote his autobiography, called Up From the Walking Dead: The Charles McGregor Story with Sharon Sopher.

== Filmography ==
Year	Title	Role	Notes
1971	The French Connection	'Baldy'	Uncredited
1971	Born to Win	Lethal Messenger	
1972	The Ringer	Advertising Executive	
1972	Come Back Charleston Blue	'Fatback', The Bartender	
1972	Super Fly	Freddie 'Fat Freddie'	
1972	Across 110th Street	'Chink'	
1973	Gordon's War	Jim, Drug Dealer On Subway Station Platform	Uncredited
1973	Hell Up in Harlem	Himself	
1974	Blazing Saddles	Charlie	
1974	Three the Hard Way	Charley	
1975	That's the Way of the World	Mantan	
1975	Take a Hard Ride	Cloyd	
1975	Aaron Loves Angela	'Duke'	
1977	The Baron	The Cokeman	
1977	Andy Warhol's Bad	Detective Hughes	(final film role)
