= Jacksoul =

Canadian music group

- Origin: Toronto, Ontario, Canada
- Genres: Soul, R&B
- Years active: 1992–2009
- Label: Sony
- Past members: Haydain Neale; Davide Direnzo; John Kanakis; Justin Abedin; Ron Lopata; Dave Murray; Brent Setterington; Adam Leo; Roger Travassos; Alistair Robertson
- Website: jacksoul.com

Jacksoul, sometimes stylized as jackSOUL, was a Canadian soul and R&B music group formed in 1992 in Toronto. The band was fronted by singer Haydain Neale and was a multi-recipient of the Juno Award.

== Biography ==
In 1994, jacksoul independently released their debut album, Twilight. The album featured the single "Unconditional". The music video for "Unconditional" was nominated for a MuchMusic Video Award for Best R&B/Soul Music Video. In 1996, jacksoul released their next album, Absolute. The album featured the singles "(Do You) Like It Like That" and "Eastbound".

The band became best known for their hits "Can't Stop", "Still Believe in Love", and "Somedays".

Each of the band's albums were nominated for a Juno Award, and the group won the award for R&B/Soul Recording of the Year in 2001, 2007 and 2010. The band won a Canadian Urban Music Award in 2004.

Neale was involved in a traffic accident on the evening of August 3, 2007, and was sent to hospital. On August 18, 2007, it was reported that Neale had been in a coma since the accident occurred.

On October 1, 2007, jacksoul's official site announced that Neale had been making a very promising recovery to date, although he continued to be in the hospital. On January 30, 2008, a spokesperson for the family reported that Neale had continued to improve since the last official statement.

Following his recovery, Neale completed work on the album he had started to work on prior to the accident. On October 26, 2009, the band announced that the album, entitled SOULmate and to contain 10 new songs written before singer Neale's accident, would be released on December 1, 2009. All profits from the album go to the Haydain Neale Family Trust.

The first single, "Lonesome Highway", was made available on November 3, 2009.

On November 22, 2009, Neale died of lung cancer at Toronto's Mount Sinai Hospital.

In 2014, the band released a greatest hits compilation, which featured the previously unreleased songs "Got to Have It", "Whole Day" and "Spiralling". The song "Got to Have It" garnered a Juno Award nomination for R&B/Soul Recording of the Year at the Juno Awards of 2015.

== Discography ==
=== Studio albums ===
- Absolute (August 14, 1996)
- Sleepless (April 4, 2000)
- Resurrected (March 23, 2004) - #34 CAN (Nielsen SoundScan)
- mySoul (June 20, 2006) - #32 CAN (Nielsen SoundScan)
- Soulmate (December 1, 2009) - #47 CAN (Nielsen SoundScan)

=== Singles ===
- "(Do You) Like It Like That"
- "Eastbound"
- "Unconditional"
- "Can't Stop" - #8 CAN (RPM 100)
- "Somedays" - #39 CAN (RPM 100)
- "I Know What You Want"
- "Still Believe in Love" - #14 CAN (BDS)
- "Shady Day"
- "Lonesome Highway"
- "All You Need"
- "Got to Have It"

== See also ==
- List of bands from Canada
