= Move On Up =

Single by Curtis Mayfield

from the album Curtis
- B-side: "Beautiful Brother Of Mine"; "Give It Up"
- Released: June 25, 1971
- Studio: RCA Studios, Chicago
- Genre: Progressive soul; psychedelic soul; funk-soul
- Length: 8:49 (album version); 2:53 (single)
- Label: Curtom
- Songwriter: Curtis Mayfield
- Producer: Curtis Mayfield

Curtis Mayfield singles chronology
"(Don't Worry) If There's a Hell Below, We're All Going to Go" (1970)	"Move On Up" (1971)	"Get Down" (1971)

Official audio
- "Move On Up" on YouTube

"Move On Up" is a song by Curtis Mayfield from his 1970 debut album, Curtis. Nearly nine minutes long on the album version, including a false ending, it was released as a single in the United States, but failed to chart. An edited version of the song spent 10 weeks in the top 50 of the UK Singles Chart in 1971, peaking at number 12, and it has become a soul classic over the years. In 2021, it was listed at No. 474 on Rolling Stone's "The 500 Greatest Songs of All Time". The song was influential on the emerging genre of progressive soul and is notable for its prominent, fast-paced percussion, featuring Henry Gibson on congas.

== Certifications ==
Region	Certification	Certified units/sales
New Zealand (RMNZ)	Platinum	30,000^{‡}
United Kingdom (BPI)	Platinum	600,000^{‡}
^{‡} Sales+streaming figures based on certification alone.

== Other cover versions and sampling ==
In 1979, disco trio Destination recorded a medley, incorporating "Keep On Pushing", a 1964 hit by the Impressions, also written by Mayfield. Along with the tracks "Up Up Up" and "Destination's Theme", "Move On Up" hit number one on the disco chart for four weeks. It peaked at number 68 on the soul singles chart.

The Jam, an English rock band active in the late 1970s to the early 1980s led by Paul Weller, released a version of the song on an extended play record in 1982, as did Weller's The Style Council in 1985.

Kentucky-based jam-band My Morning Jacket frequently covers the song in their live shows.

Just Blaze heavily sampled the song for Kanye West's 2006 single "Touch the Sky", using a slowed-down version of the horns.

Argentine ska and rock band Los Fabulosos Cadillacs covered "Move On Up" in their 16th album, El Arte de la Elegancia de LFC (The Art of Elegance of LFC), released in 2009. The song was retitled as "Vamos Ya! (Move on Up)"; "¡Vamos ya!" means "Let's Go Now!" in Castilian Spanish.

Berklee-born funk outfit Lettuce recorded "Move On Up" for their 2008 album Rage!

The song was also used in the credits for the 2024 film Lift.

== In popular culture ==
English football club Arsenal adopted the song as a popular post-game anthem at their Emirates Stadium.

The song appears in “Here to Stay,” Season 1, Episode 6 of The Bernie Mac Show.

The song appears on the soundtrack of the 2002 British film Bend It Like Beckham.

The song appears in “Margin of Error,” Season 4, Episode 6 of The Wire.

The song can also be heard on the radio in the 2014 video game Watch Dogs.

The song was used by Joe Biden following the end of his speeches during his 2020 presidential campaign.

The song is used on the soundtrack of the Ken Shapiro comedy movie The Groove Tube.

It is the walkout song of UFC Heavyweight Champion Tom Aspinall.
