= Joseph "Lucky" Scott =

American singer

- Born: Joseph H. Scott Jr; June 28, 1949; Chattanooga, Tennessee, U.S.
- Died: August 27, 1996 (age 47)
- Genres: Soul, funk, R&B
- Occupation: Musician
- Instrument: Bass
- Years active: 1968–1996

Joseph "Lucky" Scott was an American bassist, and musical director. He is most recognized for his work with Curtis Mayfield, in particular the Super Fly album. While Lucky was predominantly the bassist and musical director for Curtis Mayfield, his credits also include The Impressions, Aretha Franklin, Natalie Cole, The Staple Singers, Leroy Hutson, Gladys Knight, and more. He played a Fender Jazz bass with flat wound strings and had an aggressive right-hand plucking technique that was very percussive.

Born in Chattanooga, Tennessee, Lucky began performing in the local music scene at a very young age. He was the nephew of The Impressions singer Sam Gooden. In 1968, The Impressions lost their road band in a tragic car accident on Interstate 85. Eager to continue working they assembled a new band that included Lucky. Despite not being able to read music Lucky went on to become the band leader for The Impressions for a number of years during a critical time in their careers. They were starting to perform at such staples as the Fillmore West and Dick Clark's American Bandstand. Not too long after this period in 1970 Curtis Mayfield left the band to pursue a solo career and took Lucky with him.

Lucky went on to work extensively with Curtis Mayfield as his musical director and bassist. Oftentimes when working on new music Curtis and Lucky would sit down and write together which is likely why Curtis' music was so bass driven.

Joseph "Lucky" Scott has recorded at least 15 albums with Curtis Mayfield alone and has many more credits with other artists. Rolling Stone listed Super Fly as number 72 in the list of 500 Greatest Albums of All Time. In 2003, the bass driven album was also named the 63rd greatest album of all time by VH1. The title track was selected by the Rock and Roll Hall of Fame as one of the "500 Songs that Shaped Rock and Roll" making Lucky Scott a behind-the-scenes hero of music.

In August 1996, Joseph "Lucky" Scott died from a blood clot to his lungs. He was 47 years old.

== Discography ==
With Curtis Mayfield

- Curtis/Live! (Curtom, 1971)
- Roots (Curtom, 1971)
- Super Fly (Curtom, 1972)
- Back to the World (Curtom, 1973)
- Curtis in Chicago (Curtom, 1973)
- Sweet Exorcist (Curtom, 1974)
- Got To Find A Way (Curtom, 1974)
- There's No Place Like America Today (Curtom, 1975)
- Let's Do It Again (Curtom, 1975)
- Give, Get, Take, and Have (Curtom, 1976)
- Short Eyes (Curtom, 1977)
- Never Say You Can't Survive (Curtom, 1977)
- Honesty (Boardwalk Label, 1983)
- We Come in Peace with a Message of Love (Curtom, 1985)
- Live in Europe (Curtom, 1988)

With others

- This Is My Country (Curtom, 1968) by The Impressions
- The Young Mods' Forgotten Story (Curtom, 1969) by The Impressions
- Check Out Your Mind! (Curtom, 1970) by The Impressions
- Times Have Changed (Buddah Records, 1972) by The Impressions
- The Man! (Curtom, 1974) by Leroy Hutson
- Claudine (Buddah Records, 1974) by Gladys Knight & the Pips
- Natalie (Capitol, 1976) by Natalie Cole
- Pass It On (Warner Bros. Records, 1976) by The Staples
- Almighty Fire (Atlantic, 1978) by Aretha Franklin
