= That's the Way of the World (film) =

1975 film by Sig Shore

- Original 1975 theatrical poster
- Directed by: Sig Shore
- Written by: Robert Lipsyte
- Produced by: Sig Shore
- Starring: Harvey Keitel; Ed Nelson; Earth, Wind & Fire
- Cinematography: Alan Metzger
- Edited by: Bruce Wittkin
- Music by: Maurice White
- Production company: Sig Shore Productions
- Distributed by: United Artists
- Release date: June 20, 1975
- Running time: 100 minutes
- Country: United States
- Language: English

That's the Way of the World is a 1975 film produced and directed by Sig Shore and starring Harvey Keitel. It features the music of R&B/Funk group Earth, Wind & Fire (who also appear in the picture as a fictionalized version of themselves). The film depicts the music business and the life of record executives. A soundtrack by Earth, Wind & Fire released in the same year eventually became one of the group's landmark albums.

== Plot ==
Coleman Buckmaster, also known as "the Golden Ear", is a producer extraordinaire for A-Chord Records. In the midst of working slavishly to complete the debut album of "the Group", Buckmaster is forced to put their project on the back-burner in favor of a new signing to A-Chord, "the Pages," Velour, Gary and Franklin. According to label head Carlton James, the Pages represent good, old-fashioned, wholesome family values. According to Buckmaster, they represent everything wrong with the music business: a soulless pastiche of cheese-on-white-bread, and he wants nothing to do with them. However, due to his contract, he is forced to turn the flat song of their demo, "Joy, Joy, Joy" into a workable hit. In the meantime, he ends up in a relationship with Velour, seemingly also against his will, but he is able to use the relationship to his and the Group's advantage, then to break the news of a makeshift marriage to Velour, updated her part of the music contract, the Pages. A twist where everybody wins.

== Cast ==
- Harvey Keitel as Coleman Buckmaster
- Earth, Wind & Fire as the Group
- John Szymanski as Russell

== See also ==
- List of American films of 1975
