= John & Ernest =

American novelty song ensemble

John & Ernest were an American novelty song ensemble, composed of Jéan Free and Ernest Smith. They scored a hit single in 1973 with the record "Super Fly Meets Shaft", which hit #31 on the Top 40. The record consisted of lines from popular songs of the day, which tell a story about the main characters from the movies Super Fly and Shaft. The record is done in the style of Dickie Goodman, who produced the hit. John & Ernest also released a second 45 rpm, called "Soul President Number One", which did not chart, as well as two other songs entitled "Crossover" and "Problems".
