= Claudine (soundtrack) =

1974 soundtrack album by Gladys Knight & the Pips

Soundtrack album by Gladys Knight & the Pips
- Released: March 1974
- Recorded: Curtom (Chicago, Illinois)
- Genre: Soul
- Length: 30:18
- Label: Buddah
- Producer: Curtis Mayfield

Gladys Knight & the Pips chronology
Imagination (1973)	Claudine (1974)	I Feel a Song (1974)

Curtis Mayfield chronology
Curtis in Chicago (1973)	Claudine (1974)	Sweet Exorcist (1974)

Professional ratings
Review scores
Source	Rating
AllMusic	3/5 stars
Christgau's Record Guide	A−
Rolling Stone	(not rated)
The Rolling Stone Album Guide	3/5 stars

Claudine is a Gladys Knight & the Pips album, written and produced by Curtis Mayfield. The disc is the soundtrack album for the 1974 20th Century Fox motion picture Claudine, starring James Earl Jones and Diahann Carroll. The album was released in March 1974 on the Buddah label.

The first single release, "On and On", reached number 2 on the R&B chart and number5 on the Billboard Hot 100 chart. A second single, "Make Yours a Happy Home", was released two years later in 1976 and was a moderate hit, peaking at number 13 R&B and number 35 on the UK Singles Chart. The album also included one instrumental, "Claudine Theme". The album was also their third of five R&B albums chart-toppers. Also included is a cover of Mayfield's "The Makings of You".

== Track listing ==
All tracks are written by Curtis Mayfield.

Side one
No.	Title	Length
1.	"Mr. Welfare Man"	5:30
2.	"To Be Invisible"	3:45
3.	"On and On"	3:44
4.	"The Makings of You"	2:24

Side two
No.	Title	Length
1.	"Claudine Theme" (Instrumental)	4:30
2.	"Hold On"	5:17
3.	"Make Yours a Happy Home"	4:35

== Personnel ==
- Rich Tufo – arranger
- Roger Anfinsen – engineer
- Milton Sincoff – creative packaging director
- Joseph "Lucky" Scott – bass
- Curtis Mayfield, Phil Upchurch – guitars
- Quentin Joseph – drums
- Henry Gibson – congas
- Rich Tufo – keyboards, organ

== Charts ==
Chart (1974)	Peak
U.S. Billboard Top LPs	35
U.S. Billboard Top Soul LPs	1

Singles

Year	Single	Chart positions		
Year	Single	US	US R&B	UK
1974	"On and On"	5	2	—
1976	"Make Yours a Happy Home"	—	13	35

== See also ==
- List of number-one R&B albums of 1974 (U.S.)
