= Super Fly (1972 film) =

1972 film by Gordon Parks Jr.

- Theatrical release poster by Tom Jung
- Directed by: Gordon Parks Jr.
- Written by: Phillip Fenty
- Produced by: Sig Shore
- Starring: Ron O'Neal; Carl Lee; Julius W. Harris; Sheila Frazier; Charles McGregor
- Cinematography: James Signorelli
- Edited by: Bob Brady
- Music by: Curtis Mayfield
- Production company: Superfly Ltd.
- Distributed by: Warner Bros.
- Release date: August 4, 1972
- Running time: 91 minutes
- Country: United States
- Language: English
- Budget: <$500,000 or $150,000
- Box office: >$30 million or $18.6 million (US)

Super Fly is a 1972 American blaxploitation crime drama film directed by Gordon Parks Jr. and starring Ron O'Neal as Youngblood Priest, an African American cocaine dealer who is trying to quit the underworld drug business. The film is well known for its soundtrack, written and produced by soul musician Curtis Mayfield. It was released by Warner Bros. on August 4, 1972.

O'Neal reprised his role as Youngblood Priest in the 1973 film Super Fly T.N.T., which he also directed. Producer Sig Shore directed a second sequel, The Return of Superfly, released in 1990, with Nathan Purdee as Priest. A remake was released in 2018.

In 2022, the film was selected for preservation in the United States National Film Registry by the Library of Congress as being "culturally, historically, or aesthetically significant."

== Plot ==
Youngblood Priest, an African-American cocaine dealer, enjoys a luxurious lifestyle in Harlem. He yearns to go straight, despite the fortune he makes. One day, Priest confronts Fat Freddie, one of his dealers, about money that Freddie owes and threatens to force Freddie's wife into prostitution unless he robs a competitor. Although the timid Freddie abhors violence, he agrees and accompanies another member of Priest's "family" of lower-level dealers to commit the robbery.

Priest discusses his plan to buy thirty kilos of high-quality cocaine with the $300,000 he and his partner Eddie have, which they can sell for $1,000,000 within four months. With such a big score, they can retire comfortably. Eddie argues that crime is the only option left to them by "The Man." That night, Eddie and Priest approach Scatter, a retired dealer who started Priest in the business. Scatter initially refuses to help Priest. Eddie threatens Scatter, demanding that he reveal his source if he will not supply them, but Scatter holds him at gunpoint. Priest defuses the situation and persuades Scatter to help them, although Scatter warns that it will be the last time.

Priest and Eddie are joined by Freddie, who turns over the money he stole. The next day, Freddie is picked up for fighting, and when he is beaten by the police, he reveals when and where Priest and Eddie are to pick up the first kilo of cocaine from Scatter. Freddie attempts to escape and is killed when he runs in front of a car.

That night, after picking up the kilo from Scatter, Priest and Eddie are apprehended by several policemen. The lieutenant reveals that he is Scatter's supplier and that they can have as much "weight," as they want, and will be extended both credit and protection. Eddie is elated by the new situation, claiming that they are set for life, although Priest is still determined to quit after selling the thirty kilos. Soon after, the drugs are sold by Priest and Eddie's "family."

Priest's white mistress, Cynthia, is dismayed to learn that Priest does not return her love and is planning on quitting the business. Their argument is interrupted by the sudden arrival of Scatter who reveals that the real head of the operation is Deputy Commissioner Reardon, who is trying to kill him for quitting. Scatter gives Priest a packet of information on Reardon and his family. Scatter is captured by the corrupt policemen, who give him a fatal overdose of drugs.

Both enraged and scared, Priest gives the information on Reardon and an envelope of cash to two mafia men and takes out a $100,000 contract on "the Man's" life. Priest demands his half of their profits from Eddie. After Priest leaves with the cash, Eddie betrays him by phoning the lieutenant. Priest has anticipated Eddie's duplicity, however, and gives the briefcase carrying the money to a disguised Georgia in exchange for one full of rags. Priest is then picked up by the lieutenant and taken to the waterfront, where he is confronted by Reardon.

Reardon threatens Priest that he must continue selling drugs as long as he is ordered to, but when Priest refuses, the policemen begin to beat him. Priest overcomes his foes using karate, then reveals that he knows exactly who Reardon is. Priest explains that he hired contract killers to murder Reardon and his entire family should anything happen to him. The powerless Reardon then watches as Priest walks away free, giving the policemen one final glare before driving off to join Georgia.

== Cast ==
- Ron O'Neal as "Youngblood" Priest
- Carl Lee as Eddie
- Julius W. Harris as "Scatter"
- Sheila Frazier as Georgia
- Charles McGregor as Freddie "Fat Freddie"
- Sig Shore (credited as Mike Richards) as Deputy Commissioner Reardon
- Polly Niles as Cynthia
- Yvonne Delaine as Freddie's Wife
- K.C. as Pimp
- Chris Arnett as Coke Buyer
- E. Preston Reddick as Karate Instructor
- Curtis Mayfield as Himself (The Curtis Mayfield Experience)
- Master Henry Gibson as Himself (The Curtis Mayfield Experience)
- Lucky Scott as Himself (The Curtis Mayfield Experience)
- Craig McMullen as Himself (The Curtis Mayfield Experience)
- Tyrone McCullough as Himself (The Curtis Mayfield Experience)

== Production ==
Filming took place from January to mid-April 1972 in New York City. The film was financed by two directors: Gordon Parks, who had directed the 1971 film Shaft, and Sig Shore, who produced Super Fly and played Deputy Commissioner Riordan, or "The Man" in the film. Large companies produced many of the blaxploitation films, and Super Fly is no exception. The film was acquired and distributed by Warner Bros. and had a white producer (Shore). African-Americans were a part of the process as well, with Gordon Parks Jr. as director and Phillip Fenty as screenwriter.

Nate Adams coordinated the fashion and wardrobe for the film. He had done several fashion shows prior to Super Fly. He still owns many of the suits, shoes and fedora hats.

Charles McGregor, who plays Fat Freddie, was released from prison before the film's production. The film was shot by director of photography James Signorelli, who later became the film segment director for Saturday Night Live.

Carl Lee, who played Eddie, enjoyed television fame until he abused drugs – in particular, heroin. He died in 1986 of an overdose. The film's soundtrack by Curtis Mayfield was well enough received that he was sought for other soundtracks. The songs "Freddie's Dead" and the title song both shot up the Pop Top Ten chart in late 1972, with each single selling over a million copies.

The movie generated roughly $4 million in profits. Shore received the bulk of the profits since he put up the most money, 40 percent, while the actors, directors, and scriptwriters split the remaining profits. The soundtrack alone generated about $5 million in profits – one of the first film soundtracks to earn such a sizable return – primarily from the biggest singles "Super Fly" and "Freddie's Dead." As the soundtrack's composer, Mayfield was the only other person in the production who earned revenue approaching Shore's.

Despite the controversy surrounding Super Fly's' drug use, the production of the film made significant advances for African-Americans. The Harlem community backed Super Fly financially, and a number of black businesses helped with the production costs. Another quality that distinguishes Super Fly from other blaxploitation films was the technical crew, the majority of which was non-white, constituting the largest non-white technical crew in its time. Altogether, such an independently financed film ultimately had unusually large financial backing.

== Reception ==
=== Critical reception and box-office ===
Review aggregator website Rotten Tomatoes reports that 93% of 28 professional film critics gave the film a positive review, with an average rating of 7.3/10. On Metacritic, the film holds a weighted average score of 67 out of 100 based on eight reviews, indicating "generally favorable reviews."

After an initial gross of $24.8 million, the film was re-released in 1973 and earned $2 million in US and Canada rentals. It was the highest-grossing blaxploitation film at the time.

=== Social analysis ===
At the time Super Fly was released, there were many African-Americans displeased with the images of black culture portrayed in films such as Super Fly, Sweet Sweetback’s Baadassssss Song, and Shaft. Junius Griffin, the head of the Hollywood branch of the NAACP stated, "we must insist that our children are not exposed to a steady diet of so-called black movies that glorify black males as pimps, dope pushers, gangsters, and super males." The Congress for Racial Equality, the National Association for the Advancement of Colored People and other organizations attempted to block the film's distribution, and pushed for more African-American involvement in Hollywood's creative process. The Student National Coordinating Committee protested the film as a tool of white oppression. The filmmakers maintained it was their desire to show the negative and empty aspects of the drug subculture. This is evident in the movie from the beginning, as Priest communicates his desire to leave the business. However, nearly every character in the film, with the notable exception of his "main squeeze," tries to dissuade Priest from quitting, with their chief argument being that dealing and drug use are the best he ever could achieve in life.

Super Fly resonated with many of the post-Civil Rights Movement generation of African Americans, who saw Youngblood as a new example of how to rise in the American class system. Several California organized crime veterans, including drug trafficker "Freeway" Rick Ross, have cited the film as an influence upon their personal decision to take up drug dealing and gang violence.

Film scholar Manthiahas Diawara suggested the film's glorification of drug dealers served to subtly critique the civil rights movement's failure to provide better economic opportunities for black America, and that the portrayal of a black community controlled by drug dealers serves to highlight that the initiatives of the civil rights movement were far from fully accomplished.

== DVD release ==
A standard definition DVD was released by Warner Home Video on January 14, 2004—the day its star, Ron O'Neal, died after battling cancer. The original blue and orange Warner logo is replaced by the updated AOL/Warner logo used at the time of DVD release. The end credits on the original film release and video cassette differ from the DVD. On the original release and videocassette, the film end credits roll with a shot of the top of the Empire State Building and the title track ("Superfly") plays.

After "The End" is displayed, the film fades to black, but Mayfield's "Superfly" continues to play for a few minutes until the track ends. In the DVD release, Warner Bros. decided to fade out the track midway right as "The End" is shown, and again brings up the AOL/Warner logo.

In June 2018, the Warner Archive Collection released Super Fly on Blu-ray, and has received mostly praise for its video & audio restoration.

== Remake ==
Superfly was remade by Director X and released in June 2018 with a cast that included Trevor Jackson and Jason Mitchell.

== See also ==
- List of American films of 1972
- List of blaxploitation films
- List of cult films
