= The Return of Superfly =

1991 crime film

- Theatrical release poster
- Directed by: Sig Shore
- Screenplay by: Anthony Wisdom
- Produced by: Sig Shore; Anthony Wisdom
- Starring: Nathan Purdee; Margaret Avery
- Cinematography: Anghel Decca
- Edited by: John Mullen
- Music by: Curtis Mayfield
- Production companies: Crash Pictures; Littoral Productions
- Distributed by: Triton Pictures
- Release date: November 9, 1990
- Running time: 95 minutes
- Country: United States
- Language: English
- Box office: $610,402

The Return of Superfly is a 1990 American crime drama film directed by Sig Shore. The film is a sequel to the 1973 film Super Fly T.N.T.. It stars Nathan Purdee as Youngblood Priest (replacing Ron O'Neal from the two previous films) and Margaret Avery.

In the film, Priest returns to New York from Paris to find who is responsible for his friend's murder. With a couple of new friends, he attempts to bring the killers to justice while trying not to get into criminal activity like he did years ago.

== Plot ==
Joey Maxwell, Manuel, and Reynaldo invade a New York City drug den in Harlem, killing three dealers. One escapes long enough to telephone his boss, Eddie Baker, but Eddie is having sex. The killers break in and murder Eddie and his girl. Reformed drug dealer Youngblood Priest, who has been living in Paris, France, for the past decade, returns to New York City for Eddie's funeral. Arrested by customs officers at JFK Airport, Priest is sent to a detention center. He telephones Tom Perkins, his former lawyer, who arranges a meeting with New York City Police Department Inspector Wolinski. Perkins tells Wolinski that the statute of limitations has expired on Priest's crimes, but Wolinski informs him that there is no statute of limitations on perjury.

Wolinski introduces Priest to a Drug Enforcement Agency (DEA) agent who offers a bargain: Priest can return to his old gang if he works as an informant. However, Priest claims his gang no longer exists. Besides, he has changed since the old days and now has a legitimate business in Paris. Inspector Wolinski turns Priest loose for a week to think it over. Meanwhile, Tom Perkins informs local crime boss Hector Estrada that Priest is being "squeezed" by the "Feds," and Estrada tells Joey Maxwell to get rid of the problem. Youngblood Priest goes to the penthouse apartment of his old friend, Armando, and finds a beautiful woman, Irene, taking a shower. She explains that Armando gave her a key, and that Armando's Chevrolet Corvette is in the basement if Priest needs a car. Priest visits the home of Nate Cabot, one of his old drug partners. Nate laments that most of their friends are dead or in prison, but Joey Maxwell, one of Priest's former employees, has become the henchman for drug kingpin Hector Estrada. Nate and his wife make crack cocaine in their kitchen for Estrada's operation. Priest tells Nate he has money to spend and wants to meet Maxwell or Estrada. Nate promises to check around, but tells Priest not to trust him with the task. Returning to Tom Perkins's office, Priest meets another of the lawyer's clients, a club owner named Francine. Perkins reminds Priest that the DEA is still waiting to hear whether he is going to cooperate.

As Priest gives Francine a ride to her club, she explains that she knew Eddie for a long time, but there was nothing romantic between them. She gives Priest her business card. Noticing that two white policemen, Mike and Ike, are following him, Priest drives into the garage of an apartment building, parks, and tries to elude them on foot, but the officers stop him in an alley and beat him. However, a white plainclothes cop, Louis, breaks it up and lets Priest go. Meanwhile, when Tom Perkins alerts Hector Estrada that Priest will be a problem, Estrada declares Priest to be "as good as dead." Priest stops at Francine's bar, recognizes nobody, and talks to the bartender. Elsewhere, Irene returns to the penthouse and finds Joey Maxwell, Manuel, and Reynaldo waiting. Irene pulls a gun and shoots Renaldo in the leg, but Manuel kills her. As the three leave, Priest arrives and finds Irene dead. Moments later, three uniformed policemen enter the penthouse and arrest him. He is taken to a police station, but the DEA intervenes and gets him released. Louis, the white plainclothes policeman who saved him from Mike and Ike, alerts Priest that the killers went to the penthouse to kill him, not Irene. Meanwhile, Hector Estrada orders Joey Maxwell to find Priest and kill him.

When Priest goes to Francine's club, she warns him that people are looking for him and slips him out the back door. Meanwhile, Nate gets a phone call from Joey about the whereabouts of Priest and tells him he is coming to his house. Getting into a taxi, Priest tells the Jamaican driver to evade the car behind them. Meanwhile, Joey Maxwell, Mike, and Ike visit Nate and tell him that since his friend Priest is a traitor, Nate is probably one as well. When Nate cannot tell them where Priest is, Maxwell orders Ike and Mike to kill him. Joey points a gun in Nate's mouth and Mike shoots Nate, supposedly killing him. After Priest and Francine have sex at her place, she sends him to see Willy Green, Eddie Baker's eccentric best friend. Dressed in camouflage clothes, Willy greets Priest with a shotgun, but recognizes his name from stories Eddie told him. Priest knows who killed Eddie, but needs Willy's help to avenge his death. Willy is a Viet Nam war veteran whose specialty was demolition with nitroglycerin. He also has an arsenal of rifles, pistols, and automatic weapons, from which Priest selects a pistol. He returns to Francine's office to ask her about a girl Willy mentioned as being Joey Maxwell's girl friend. Francine reveals her name to be Jasmine Jackson. After Priest leaves, one of the white uniformed policemen enters the bar asking for Francine, the bartender silently signals her office, but as Francine slips out the back, the other cop is waiting.

Mike and Ike handcuff Francine and drive her to a park where Joey Maxwell waits. She insists she has no idea where Priest is, so Maxwell gives her to Ike and Mike for further persuasion and leaves. Later, as Maxwell arrives at his apartment with Jasmine Jackson, Priest accosts him with a gun. When Maxwell struggles, Priest knocks him unconscious, empties his wallet, gives all the money to Jasmine, and tells her to take a vacation. He takes the bound-and-gagged gangster to Willy's house. Willy straps a nitroglycerin bomb around Joey Maxwell's neck, and Priest warns him that the wrong move could blow his head off. Maxwell confesses that Ike, Mike, and Hector killed Irene and Nate. Priest makes Maxwell telephone Mike and Ike and order them to drive to a remote location. The cops park, and a boy on a bicycle distracts them while Willy Green crawls under their cruiser and plants explosives.

As Willy hurries away, the car blows up. Joey Maxwell reveals where he keeps his cocaine, and Priest and Willy go to a warehouse. While Willy distracts the security guard, Priest climbs a fire escape, breaks into Maxwell's office, and mixes something into a large, plastic container of crack cocaine. Meanwhile, at a club, Hector orders Manuel and Reynaldo to get the latest batch of crack cocaine on the street. Manuel and Reynaldo hurry to the warehouse, where they bag and weigh packets of the contaminated drug, and deliver it to dealers. However, because of Priest's added ingredient, addicts get sick and demand their money back. One angry young black man chases a dealer off a roof. At Willy Green's house, Priest coerces Maxwell into divulging the addresses of his crack houses.

Meanwhile, Hector makes telephone inquiries from his office to find out who adulterated his drugs. Priest sends Willy to blow up several of the gang's storefronts. The next morning, Tom Perkins advises Hector Estrada to "lay low" until the violence subsides, because the DEA is investigating. Manuel speculates that the explosions at the gang's storefronts must be the work of Willy Green, the only bomb expert in Eddie Baker's gang. Manuel and Reynaldo break into Willy's house, shoot him, and free Joey Maxwell, who revives his spirits by inhaling drugs, not realizing they are contaminated. Suddenly, with his last breath, Willy shoots Reynaldo.

Returning to the house, Priest hears gunshots. He blows open the door with nitroglycerine and kills Manuel in the subsequent shootout. Both Priest and Joey Maxwell are wounded as they run, shooting from the house, but Maxwell stops to vomit. As angry neighborhood people surround Maxwell, police arrive to arrest him. Tom Perkins and Hector Estrada are offered deals in return for their cooperation to inform on the entire "Colombian set-up." Youngblood Priest returns to Paris with Francine.

== Cast ==
- Nathan Purdee as "Youngblood" Priest
- Margaret Avery as Francine
- Leonard L. Thomas as Joey Maxwell
- Christopher Curry as Tom Perkins
- Carlos Carrasco as Hector Estrada
- Samuel L. Jackson as Nate Cabot
- David Groh as Inspector Wolinski
- John Gabriel as Sergeant Joyner
- Tico Wells as Willy Green
- Patrice Ablack as Irene Gates
- Arnie Mazer as Marty Ryan
- Ruthanna Graver as Jasmine Jackson
- Luis Antonio Ramos as Manuel
- Kirk Taylor as Renaldo
- David E.Weinberg as DEA Agent
- John Hayden as Officer Ike
- Joe Spataro as Officer Mike
- Bill Corsair as Lieutenant Kinsella
- John Canada Terrell as Detective Loomey
- Sonya Hensley as Martha Nixon
- Lisa Andoh as Eddie's Girlfriend
- Maxine Harrison as Marla Cabot
- Antone Pagan as Officer Perez
- Rony Clanton as Eddie Baker (uncredited)
- Tone Loc as (uncredited)

== Reception ==
The movie had a mostly negative reaction.

== Soundtrack ==
A soundtrack containing hip hop music and songs by Curtis Mayfield was released on August 13, 1990, by Capitol Records. It peaked #72 on the Top R&B/Hip-Hop Albums.
