= Sweet Exorcist (album) =

Studio album by Curtis Mayfield
- Released: May 1974
- Studios: Curtom, Chicago, Illinois
- Genre: Progressive soul
- Length: 32:30
- Label: Curtom
- Producer: Curtis Mayfield

Curtis Mayfield chronology
Claudine (1974)	Sweet Exorcist (1974)	Got to Find a Way (1974)

Singles from Sweet Exorcist
- 1. "Kung Fu" Released: June 1974; 2. "Sweet Exorcist" Released: October 1974

Professional ratings
Review scores
Source	Rating
AllMusic	3/5 stars
Christgau's Record Guide	C
Rolling Stone	unfavorable

Sweet Exorcist is the fifth studio album by Curtis Mayfield, released in May 1974. It peaked at number 39 on the Billboard 200 chart, as well as number 2 on the Top R&B/Hip-Hop Albums chart.

== Background ==
Art Kass, co-founder of Buddah Records, announced Sweet Exorcist in the April 13, 1974, issue of Cashbox. "As a poet and spokesman, as well as a musician, Curtis Mayfield has helped bring black music to its place in the center of American popular music. Sweet Exorcist is a deeply lyrical album and, at the same time, its rhythms and themes capture our times as only Curtis could do," Art Kass said at a press conference.

== Cover art ==
The original vinyl release cover, designed by Bill Ronalds, shows men like Greek gods holding planets in the middle of a sea of human skeletons. The title of the album Sweet Exorcist is prominently displayed in capital letters. Below is the first verse of "To Be Invisible".

== Track listing ==
All tracks are written by Curtis Mayfield, except "Suffer" by Mayfield and Donny Hathaway.

No.	Title	Length
1.	"Ain't Got Time"	5:11
2.	"Sweet Exorcist"	3:53
3.	"To Be Invisible"	4:13
4.	"Power to the People"	3:29
5.	"Kung Fu"	6:12
6.	"Suffer"	4:04
7.	"Make Me Believe in You"	5:28
Total length:		32:30

Reissue edition bonus track
No.	Title	Length
8.	"Kung Fu" (Single Edit)	3:49

== Personnel ==
Credits adapted from liner notes.

- Curtis Mayfield – production, guitar
- Phil Upchurch – guitar
- Rich Tufo – arrangement (except "Power to the People", "Kung Fu", and "Suffer"), keyboards
- Floyd Morris - Organ
- Quinton Joseph – drums
- Gil Askey – arrangement (on "Power to the People", "Kung Fu", and "Suffer")
- R. Anfinsen – engineering
- J. Janus – engineering
- Milton Sincoff – creative packaging design
- Bill Ronalds – illustration

== Charts ==
Chart	Peak position
US Billboard 200	39
US Top R&B/Hip-Hop Albums (Billboard)	2
