= Gordon Parks Jr. =

American film director (1934–1979)

- Born: Gordon Roger Parks Jr. December 7, 1934; Minneapolis, Minnesota, U.S.
- Died: April 3, 1979 (aged 44); Nairobi, Kenya
- Occupation: Film director
- Parent: Gordon Parks (father)

Gordon Roger Parks Jr. (December 7, 1934 – April 3, 1979) was an American film director, best known for the 1972 film Super Fly.

== Life and career ==
Parks was born to Sally Alvis and photographer and director Gordon Parks in Minneapolis in 1934. The younger Parks followed in his father's footsteps after his father had success with the blaxploitation hit Shaft (1971).

== Death ==
Parks died on April 3, 1979 along with three others when their small airplane crashed after takeoff near Nairobi, Kenya, where they had gone to make a film. He was 44 years old.

== Filmography ==
- Super Fly (1972)
- Three the Hard Way (1974)
- Thomasine & Bushrod (1974)
- Aaron Loves Angela (1975)
- The Bushtrackers (1980) (started filming 1979 as Revenge; Gary Strieker finished)
