= Haydain Neale =

Canadian singer-songwriter (1970–2009)

Background information
- Born: September 3, 1970
- Origin: Hamilton, Ontario
- Died: November 22, 2009 (aged 39) Toronto, Ontario
- Genres: Soul, R&B
- Occupation: Singer-songwriter
- Years active: 1990–2009

Haydain Neale (September 3, 1970 – November 22, 2009) was a Canadian singer-songwriter from Hamilton, Ontario. He was best known as the lead singer of the band jacksoul. Neale also served on the faculty of the Humber College Summer Songwriting Workshop and as president of the Songwriters Association of Canada.

He starred in the commissioned jazz opera Québécité by George Elliot Clarke, which debuted at the Guelph Jazz Festival in 2003. Neale played Ovide Rimbaud, a Haitian-Québécois architect.

== Traffic accident ==
Neale was involved in a traffic accident on Kennedy Road in Toronto on August 3, 2007, and was sent to hospital, when a Honda Civic collided with his Vespa scooter. He was shortly thereafter reported to be in critical condition. On August 18, 2007, it was reported that Neale had been in a coma since the accident occurred. The 20-year-old driver of the car was charged with making an unsafe turn and appeared in court on October 25. On October 1, jacksoul's official webpage announced that Neale was recovering and remained in hospital. Another posting on January 8, 2008 confirmed that his condition had continued to improve.

== Death ==
On October 26, 2009, Jacksoul's official website announced that the group would be releasing their first album in over three years. The album, SOULmate, was scheduled to be released on December 1, 2009. It contains 10 new songs written before Neale's accident. The first single, "Lonesome Highway", was made available on November 3, 2009.

On November 22, 2009, aged 39, Neale, a non-smoker, died of lung cancer at Toronto's Mount Sinai Hospital. He had been diagnosed seven months earlier. In a released statement, Neale's wife Michaela said: "Through all these challenges, Haydain's sense of humour and love of music were ever-present. He constantly brightened the room with his singing and his smile. His joyful presence and beautiful voice will be missed by us all." All profits from SOULmate were directed to the Haydain Neale Family Trust.
