= Ayiko Bia =

Compilation album by Osibisa
- Released: 1992
- Recorded: 19 July 1977, Royal Festival Hall, London
- Length: 45:22
- Label: Soundwings Records

Osibisa chronology
The Warrior (1992)	Ayiko Bia (1992)	Jambo (1992)

Ayiko Bia is a compilation album by British Afro rock band Osibisa released in 1992 by Soundwings Records (MC-102.1078-2) and distributed by Serenade S.A., Barcelona, Spain.

== Track listing ==
No.	Title	Writer(s)	Length
1.	"Introduction"	Osibisa	1:39
2.	"Welcome Home"	Osei, Tontoh, Amarfio	4:15
3.	"Ayiko Bia"	Osei	1:27
4.	"Spirit Up Above"	Roland Kirk	7:40
5.	"Fire"	Osei, Tontoh, Amarfio, Ayivor, Mandengue	6:54
6.	"Music for Gong Gong"	Osei, Tontoh	7:37
7.	"Beautiful Seven – Y Sharp"	Osei, Tontoh, Amarfio	8:06
8.	"Sunshine Day"	Osei, Tontoh, Amarfio	6:57
9.	"Encore"	Osei, Tontoh, Amarfio	0:47
Total length:			45:22

=== Sources ===
- Taken from Black Magic Night: Live at the Royal Festival Hall (1977)

== Personnel ==
- Teddy Osei – saxophone
- Sol Amarfio – drums
- Mac Tontoh – trumpet
- Spartacus R – bass
- Robert Bailey – keyboards
- Wendel Richardson – lead guitar
- Lasisi Amao – percussion, tenor saxophone
- Kiki Djan – percussion
- Darko Adams Potato – percussion
