= Africa We Go Go =

Compilation album by Osibisa
- Released: 1992
- Recorded: 1981, 1990
- Length: 47:39
- Label: Soundwings Records

Osibisa chronology
Movements (1989)	Africa We Go Go (1992)	Uhuru (1992)

Africa We Go Go is a compilation album by British Afro rock band Osibisa released in 1992 by Soundwings Records (MC-102.1075-2) and distributed by Serenade S.A., Barcelona, Spain.

== Track listing ==
All songs written by Teddy Osei, Mac Tontoh and Sol Amarfio, except Woyaya written by Sol Amarfio.

No.	Title	Length
1.	"Time is Right"	5:30
2.	"Get Up"	5:22
3.	"Gumbe"	4:44
4.	"Soldier"	3:28
5.	"Jumbo"	1:34
6.	"Abele"	3:55
7.	"Kyrie Eleison"	6:20
8.	"Africa We Go Go"	4:15
9.	"Lost Fisherman"	2:33
10.	"Sakura"	3:51
11.	"Woyaya"	6:07
Total length:		47:39

=== Sources ===
- Tracks 1–5, 8, 10 from African Flight (1981)
- Tracks 6–7, 9, 11 from African Criss Cross (1990)

== Personnel ==
- Teddy Osei – Saxophone
- Sol Amarfio – Drums
- Mac Tontoh – Trumpet
- Spartacus R – Bass
- Robert Bailey – Keyboards
- Wendel Richardson – Lead Guitar
- Loughty Lasisi Amao – Percussion, Tenor Saxophone
- Kiki Djan – Percussion
- Daku 'Potato' Adams – Percussion
