= Osee Yee =

Studio album by Osibisa
- Released: 2009
- Recorded: 2009
- Length: 60:51
- Label: Golden Stool Records
- Producer: Kwame Yeboah

Osibisa chronology
Sunshine Day: The Hits (2008)	Osee Yee (2009)	The Very Best of Osibisa (2009)

Osee Yee is a studio album by Ghanaian Afro rock band Osibisa released in 2009 by Golden Stool Records – GSTOCD 002. It includes a rendition of George Harrison's song "My Sweet Lord" that's given an Osibisa funk spin. The back cover calls this an Osibisa Fourth Generation album.

== Track listing ==
No.	Title	Writer(s)	Length
1.	"Osuno"	Osei, Yeboah	1:26
2.	"Watusi"	Osei	6:03
3.	"Ayioko"	Amarfio, Osei, Tontoh	3:50
4.	"Life Time"	Osei, Tontoh	6:45
5.	"Osee Yee"	Osei, Yeboah	4:32
6.	"Yen Ara Ghana"	Osei, Yeboah	4:07
7.	"Higher and Higher"	Mensah, Jo, Osei, Yeboah	5:04
8.	"It’s OK"	Brown, Osei, Yeboah	4:41
9.	"My Sweet Lord"	George Harrison	4:36
10.	"Boyengya"	Traditional - Arranged by Adu, Osei and Yeboah	4:00
11.	"One Life"	Osei, Yeboah	4:56
12.	"Mystical"	Brown, Osei, Rentzos, Yeboah	4:49
13.	"Too Much Going On"	Osei, Tontoh	3:55
14.	"Saworowa"	Traditional - Arranged by Adu and Osei	2:49
Total length:			60:51

== Personnel ==
- Teddy Osei – tenor and soprano saxophones, flute, African drums, vocals
- Mac Tontoh – trumpet, flugelhorn
- Kwame Yeboah – congas, drums, acoustic guitar, keyboards
- Kofi Ayivor – congas, percussion
- Emmanuel Rentzos – organ, vocals
- Colin Graham – trumpet
- Alfred Kari Bannerman – lead guitar
- Phil Dawson – guitars
- Alex Kwaku-Boateng – keyboards, drums
- José Joyette – drums
- Emmanuel Afram – bass guitar
- Idris Rokhman – tenor saxophone
- Gregg Kofi Brown – vocals
- Nana Yaa – vocals

== Credits ==
- Producer – Kwame Yeboah
- Osibisa logo – Roger Dean
- Cover painting – Freyja Dean
