= Monsore =

Studio album by Osibisa
- Released: Dec 1997
- Recorded: 1995
- Length: 57:00
- Label: Red Steel Music
- Producer: Teddy Osei

Osibisa chronology
The Very Best of Osibisa (1994)	Monsore (1997)	Hot Flashback Volume 1 (1997)

Monsore is an album by British Afro rock band Osibisa released in 1997 by Red Steel Music/Flying Elephant. A version was licensed to AIM for the Australian market. Their particular sound incorporated new world-fusion elements on this studio recording. The album was recorded in London in 1995 thru 1996.

== Track listing ==
No.	Title	Writer(s)	Length
1.	"Monsore"	Inkansah, Osei	4:41
2.	"Djankoso"	Osei	4:31
3.	"Hold On"	Brown, Osei, Tontoh	4:05
4.	"Kofi Kofi"	Osei	4:05
5.	"Jambo Africa"	Osei	4:42
6.	"Morning Sun"	Brown, Osei, Owusu	6:05
7.	"Jungle Call"	Osei, Tontoh	4:23
8.	"Wo Anko Bia"	Osei	5:29
9.	"Feel Good"	Kofi, Osei	5:17
10.	"Monsore (flute version)"	Osei	3:01
11.	"Hold On (original mix)"	Brown, Osei, Tontoh	4:18
12.	"Feel Good (re-mix)"	Kofi, Osei	4:04
13.	"Aflao"	Osei	2:13
Total length:			57:00

== Personnel ==
- Teddy Osei: saxophone, vocals, flute, drums, lead and backing vocals
- Kari Bannerman, Roger Bebou, Winston Delandro, Smart Inkansah: guitars
- Jean-Karl Dikoto Mandengue, Herman Asafo-Adyei, Michael Bailey: bass guitars
- Kofi Ayivor, Gaspar Lawal, Joe Osei, Dinesh Pandit, Daku Potato, Amadu Saho: drums
- Raimi Rasheed: trombone
- Kenny Wellington, Claude Deppa: trumpets
- Errol Reid, Bessa Simon: keyboards
- Bosie: African xylophone
- Gregg Kofi Brown: lead vocals
- T-Bone, Kathy, Pam, Sherry: backing vocals

== Credits ==
- Recorded at Monroe Studios, London, England in 1995
- Producer, arranger, mixing: Teddy Osei and Robert M Corich
- Engineer, remixing: Roger Benou
- Executive producer: Robert M. Corich
- Art direction: Frank McPartland
