= Woyaya =

Studio album by Osibisa
- Released: 1971
- Recorded: 1971
- Studios: Air Studios, London
- Length: 40:44
- Label: MCA
- Producer: Tony Visconti

Osibisa chronology
Osibisa (1971)	Woyaya (1971)	Heads (1972)

Professional ratings
Review scores
Source	Rating
Christgau's Record Guide	B−

Woyaya is the second album by Ghanaian Afro-rock band Osibisa released in 1971 by MCA. It was reissued in 2004 in a two-CD pack together with the self-titled album Osibisa by BGO Records.

== Album title ==
Although conventionally spelled Woyaya the album's title is actually Wɔyaya (with an open-o), which comes from the Ghanaian Ga language of the Ga-Dangme people and translates as "We are going".

The title song was covered in 1973 by Art Garfunkel on his debut solo album Angel Clare and by the group The 5th Dimension on their 1973 album Living Together, Growing Together. "Woyaya" was also used as the signature tune for the popular Ghanaian television drama series Osofo Dadzie, which was broadcast between 1972 and 1981.

== Track listing ==
No.	Title	Writer(s)	Length
1.	"Beautiful Seven"	Osei, Tontoh	6:42
2.	"Y Sharp"	Osibisa	6:20
3.	"Spirits Up Above"	Roland Kirk	7:18
4.	"Survival"	Tontoh, Osei	6:07
5.	"Move On"	Richardson	4:42
6.	"Rabiatu"	Amao	5:07
7.	"Woyaya"	Amarfio	4:28
Total length:			40:44

== Personnel ==
Osibisa

- Teddy Osei – tenor saxophone, flute, African drums, percussion, vocals
- Sol Amarfio – drums, fontomfrom, bongos, African drums, cowbells, percussion, vocals
- Mac Tontoh – trumpet, flugelhorn, cowhorn, kabasa, percussion, vocals
- Spartacus R (Roy Bedeau) – bass guitar, prempensua, assorted percussion
- Wendell Richardson – lead guitar, vocals
- Robert Bailey – organ, piano, timbales, percussion, vocals
- Loughty Lasisi Amao – tenor saxophone, baritone saxophone, flute, congas, fontomfrom
- Osibisa choir – friends and lovers

== Production ==
- Producer – Tony Visconti
- Engineer – John Punter
- Recorded at Air Studios, London, England
- Cover illustration (and Osibisa logo) – Roger Dean
- Cover design – Roughedge

== Charts ==
Chart (1971–1972)	Peak position
Australian Albums (Kent Music Report)	15
Canada Top Albums/CDs (RPM)	61
Finnish Albums (The Official Finnish Charts)	12
German Albums (Offizielle Top 100)	46
Norwegian Albums (VG-lista)	9
UK Albums (Official Charts)	11
US Billboard 200	66
