= Heads (Osibisa album) =

1972 studio album by Osibisa

Studio album by Osibisa
- Released: 1972
- Recorded: July–August 1972
- Studios: Air Studios, London
- Length: 41:16
- Label: MCA
- Producers: Osibisa, John Punter

Osibisa chronology
Woyaya (1971)	Heads (1972)	Super Fly T.N.T. (1973)

Professional ratings
Review scores
Source	Rating
Christgau's Record Guide	B−

Heads is the third album by British Afro rock band Osibisa released in 1972.

== Track listing ==
No.	Title	Writer(s)	Length
1.	"Kokorokoo"	Osei, Tontoh	4:55
2.	"Wango Wango"	Richardson	4:31
3.	"So So Mi La So"	Osibisa	3:13
4.	"Sweet America"	Amao	4:22
5.	"Ye Tie Wo"	Bedeau	4:12
6.	"Che Che Kule"	Amarfio	6:32
7.	"Mentumi"	Amarfio, Osei, Richardson	3:40
8.	"Sweet Sound"	Richardson	5:06
9.	"Do You Know"	Bailey	4:45
Total length:			41:16

== Personnel ==
- Teddy Osei – tenor saxophone, flute, African drums, vocals
- Sol Amarfio – African drums, bells, bongos, cowbells, drums, percussion, vocals
- Mac Tontoh – trumpet, flugelhorn, cornet, kabasa, percussion, vocals
- Spartacus R (Roy Bedeau) – bass guitar, percussion
- Wendell Richardson – lead guitar, acoustic guitar, lead vocals
- Robert Bailey – congas, flute, acoustic guitar, Moog bass, organ, piano, electric piano, clavinet, timbales, percussion, vocals
- Loughty Lasisi Amao – tenor saxophone, baritone saxophone, flute, congas
- Robert Bailey, Jr. – bass, acoustic guitar, Moog synthesizer, organ, piano, electric piano, timbales, vocals

== Production ==
- Producer – Osibisa and John Punter
- Engineer – John Punter
- Cover painting – Abdul Mati Klarwein
- Cover design – David Howells
- Osibisa logo – Roger Dean
- Photography – Shepard Sherbell
- Remastering – Andrew Thompson
- Liner notes – Alan Robinson

== Charts ==
Chart (1972–1973)	Peak position
Australian Albums (Kent Music Report)	19
Canada Top Albums/CDs (RPM)	86
US Billboard 200	125

== Exyternal Links ==
- Heads at Discogs (list of releases)
