= Live at the Marquee (Osibisa album) =

Live album by Osibisa
- Released: 1984
- Recorded: April 5, 1983
- Length: 53:48
- Label: Premier
- Producer: Phillip Goodhand-Tait, Maurice Bacon, Kate & Derek Burbidge

Osibisa chronology
Unleashed (1983)	Live at the Marquee (1984)	Movements (1989)

Original VHS cover

Original DVD cover
- Cover of the 2003 DVD release.

Live at the Marquee is an album by British Afro rock band Osibisa recorded live at The Marquee Club, London, April 5, 1983, and released in 1984 by Premier Records under catalog #1035. The concert has been issued as VHS in 1990 by Media 7 under the title Warrior and as DVD in 2003 by Umbrella Music under the title The Marquee 25th Anniversary presents Osibisa in Concert.

== Track listing ==
No.	Title	Writer(s)	Length
1.	"Fire"	Osei, Tontoh, Amarfio, Ayivor, Mandengue
2.	"Life"	Osei, Tontoh
3.	"Ayioko"	Amarfio, Osei, Tontoh
4.	"Who's Got the Paper"	Osei, Tontoh, Amarfio, Ayivor, Mandengue, Gyan, Golly
5.	"Woyaya"	Amarfio
6.	"Music for Gong Gong"	Osei, Tontoh
7.	"Too Much Going On"	Osei, Tontoh
8.	"Happy Children"	Osei, Amarfio, Tontoh, Ayivor, Mandengue, Roussel
9.	"The Warrior"	Bertha Egnos, Gail Valery Lakier
10.	"Sunshine Day"	Osei, Tontoh, Amarfio

== DVD track listing ==
The same tracks of the show but with some different titles

1. Fire
2. Life
3. Ayioko
4. Paper/Match
5. Woyaya
6. Gong Gong
7. Too Much
8. Happy Children
9. Warrior
10. Sunshine Day

== Personnel ==
- Sol Amarfio: drums
- Kari Bannerman: guitar
- Gregg Brown: bass, vocals
- Tony Etoria: guitar
- Teddy Osei: saxophone, flute, percussion, vocals
- Daku "Potato" Adams: congas
- Errol Reid: keyboards
- Frank Tontoh: drums
- Mac Tontoh: trumpet

== Production ==
- Recorded live at The Marquee Club, London, April 5, 1983
- Production (Original): Phillip Goodhand-Tait, Maurice Bacon, Kate & Derek Burbidge
- Production (DVD): Jeff Harrison, Gil Matthews
- Direction: Don Coutts
- Cameras: Dave Swan, Barrie Dodd, Kevan Debonnaire, Badger
- Vision Mixer: Pam Hicks
- Unit Manager: Dick Allott
- Production Manager: Lucy Ogilvie
- Video Editor: Alan Goddard
- Production Assistant: Heather Staines
- Recording: Doug Bennett
- Mixing: Smudger
- Lighting: Entec Ltd.
- Thanks: Jack Barrie, Nigel Hutchins, Harold & Barbara Pendleton
- DVD Studio: Eskimo Productions
- Graphic Designer: Tim Webster
- A Zoetrope Ltd., Trilion Pictures Ltd. and Marque Entertainment Production 1983
- Released in 2004 by Umbrella Music
- Length: 53:48 min
- Resolution: 640 x 480 pixels
