= Happy Children (album) =

Studio album by Osibisa
- Released: 1973
- Recorded: September 1973
- Studio: Lansdowne Studios, Holland Park, London
- Length: 37:22
- Label: Warner Bros.
- Producer: Peter Gallen

Osibisa chronology
Superfly T.N.T. Soundtrack (1973)	Happy Children (1973)	Osibirock (1974)

Happy Children is the fifth studio album by Ghanaian Afro rock band Osibisa released in 1973 by Warner Bros. Records WB 2732. Released on CD format 2000 by One Way Records 35164 and COE Records COE 111.

== Track listing ==
No.	Title	Writer(s)	Length
1.	"Happy Children"	Osibisa	6:32
2.	"We Want to Know (Mo)"	Osibisa	5:59
3.	"Kotoku"	Osibisa	2:39
4.	"Take Your Trouble... Go"	Osibisa	4:04
5.	"Adwoa"	Osibisa	4:16
6.	"Bassa-Bassa"	Osibisa	4:57
7.	"Somaja"	Osibisa	3:35
8.	"Fire"	Osibisa	5:20
Total length:			37:22

== Track listing CD COE Records ==
1. "Happy Children"
2. "Fire"
3. "Adwoa"
4. "Take Your Trouble... Go"
5. "Bassa-Bassa"
6. "Somaja"
7. "Kotoku"
8. "We Want to Know"

== Personnel ==
- Teddy Osei – tenor saxophone, flute, percussion, vocals
- Sol Amarfio – bongos, drums
- Mac Tontoh – trumpet, flugelhorn
- Kofi Ayivor – congas, percussion
- Jean-Karl Dikoto Mandengue – bass
- Jean-Alain Roussel – keyboards

== Production ==
- Producer – Peter Gallen
- Engineer – Ashley Howe
- Cover illustration – Jeff Schrier
- Art direction – Ed Thrasher
- Photography – Fin Costello

== Charts ==
Chart (1973–1974)	Peak position
Australian Albums (Kent Music Report)	46
