= Osibirock =

Studio album by Osibisa
- Released: 1974
- Recorded: Summer 1974
- Studio: Chipping Norton Recording Studios, Chipping Norton, Oxfordshire; Lansdowne Studios, Holland Park, London
- Length: 37:29
- Label: Warner Bros.
- Producer: Peter Gallen

Osibisa chronology
Happy Children (1973)	Osibirock (1974)	Welcome Home (1975)

Osibirock is the sixth studio album by British Afro rock band Osibisa released in 1974 by Warner Bros. Records K56048 and WEA International WE 835. Issued in 2000 CD format by One Way Records 35165. The cover depicted Henri Rousseau's "Negro Attacked By a Jaguar".

== Track listing ==
All songs arranged, performed and composed by Osibisa.

No.	Title	Length
1.	"Who’s Got the Paper"	2:24
2.	"Why"	5:37
3.	"Osibirock"	2:58
4.	"Kelele"	5:15
5.	"Atinga Bells"	0:34
6.	"African Jive"	3:59
7.	"We Belong"	4:18
8.	"Komfo (High Priest)"	4:42
9.	"Kangaroo"	2:46
10.	"Home Affairs"	4:56
Total length:		37:29

== Personnel ==
Osibisa

- Teddy Osei – tenor and soprano saxophones, flute, percussion, vocals
- Mac Tontoh – trumpet, flugelhorn, percussion
- Sol Amarfio – drums, percussion
- Kofi Ayivor – congas, percussion
- Jean-Karl Dikoto Mandengue – bass guitar, percussion
- Kiki Djan – keyboards, percussion
- Paul Golly – guitar

== Production ==
- Producer – Peter Gallen
- Engineer – Ashley Howe
- Art direction – Ed Thrasher
- Cover co-ordinator – Gail Clark
- Cover concept – Peter Gallen
- Cover painting – “Negro Attacked by a Jaguar” by Henri Rousseau.
- Photography – Graham Hughes

== Charts ==
Chart (1974–1975)	Peak position
Australian Albums (Kent Music Report)	67
US Billboard 200	175
