= Ojah Awake =

Studio album by Osibisa
- Released: 1976
- Recorded: 1976
- Genre: Afro-pop
- Length: 40:47
- Label: Bronze Records (UK); Island Records (U.S.)
- Producer: Gerry Bron

Osibisa chronology
Welcome Home (1975)	Ojah Awake (1976)	Black Magic Night (1977)

Alternative cover
- 1992 CD issue: The Warrior

Ojah Awake is an album by Ghanaian Afro rock band Osibisa released in 1976 by Island Records ILPS 9411. Issued in 1995 CD format by AIM Records (AIM 1056 CD) in 1997 remastered with bonus tracks on Red Steel Music (RMCCD9209) and in 1992 by Soundwings under the title The Warrior, plus one bonus track.

== Track listing ==
No.	Title	Writer(s)	Length
1.	"The Coffee Song"	Bob Hilliard, Richard Miles	3:16
2.	"The Warrior"	Bertha Egnos, Gail Lakier	3:45
3.	"Flying Bird (Anoma)"	Sol Amarfio, Kiki Gyan, Teddy Osei, Wendell Richardson, Mac Tontoh	4:50
4.	"Cherryfield"	Amarfio, Osei, Tontoh	4:29
5.	"Dance the Body Music"	Amarfio, Gyan, Osei, Tontoh	3:56
6.	"Ojah Awake"	Amarfio, Gyan, Osei, Tontoh	4:56
7.	"Keep on Trying"	Amarfio, Kofi Ayivor, Gyan, Osei, Tontoh	5:28
8.	"Hamattan"	Amarfio, Osei, Tontoh	6:06
9.	"Sakabo"	Amarfio, Ayivor, Gyan, Mike Odumosu, Osei, Tontoh	4:01
Total length:			40:47

Bonus track on The Warrior, 1992 Soundwings CD release
No.	Title	Writer(s)	Length
10.	"Ke le le"	Osei, Tontoh, Amarfio	6:56

== Personnel ==
- Teddy Osei – tenor and soprano saxophones, flute, African drums, vocals
- Mac Tontoh – trumpet, flugelhorn, cabasa, bells, rattle, timbales
- Sol Amarfio – drums, percussion, cowbells, bongos
- Kofi Ayivor – congas, percussion
- Kiki Gyan – organ, piano, clavinet, Moog synthesizer, vocals
- Mike Odumosu – bass guitar, vocals
- Wendell Richardson – guitar, vocals
- Jake Solo – guitar on The Coffee Song and The Warrior
- Graham Smith – violin on Cherryfield

== Credits ==
- Producer – Gerry Bron
- Assistant – Teddy Osei
- Engineer – Ashley Howe
- Assistants – John Gallen, Mark Deamley, Peter Gallen, Trevor Hallesy
- Recorded at the Roundhouse Recording Studios London, 1976
- Photography and artwork concept – Graham Hughes
- Remastering – Mike Brown & Robert M Corich
