= Mystic Energy =

Studio album by Osibisa
- Released: 1980
- Recorded: 1980
- Genre: R&B; dance-pop; disco
- Length: 40:37
- Label: Calibre
- Producer: Teddy Osei, Mac Tontoh

Osibisa chronology
Black Magic Night (1977)	Mystic Energy (1980)	African Flight (1981)

Professional ratings
Review scores
Source	Rating
The Encyclopedia of Popular Music	2/5 stars

Mystic Energy is an album by the British band Osibisa. It was released in 1980 by Calibre Records. It continued their shift towards R&B and away from the world music style they had debuted with. The elephant on the cover echoes the artwork of their earlier albums.

== Critical reception ==
Newsday, reviewing a reissue, wrote: "The highlife elements in many of Osibisa's arrangements often gave the band's sound a manic, frantic density that overwhelmed the melodies. And yet the live version of Rahsaan Roland Kirk's 'Spirit Up Above' (on Mystic Energy) is a clear reminder that Osibisa's brand of Afro-jazz was right in line with albums like Miles Davis' Bitches Brew, as well as the Africa-inspired tracks on Stevie Wonder's Songs in the Key of Life."

== Track listing ==
No.	Title	Length
1.	"Meeting Point"	5:15
2.	"Celebration"	4:44
3.	"Africa We Gogo"	4:14
4.	"Oreba (Magic People)"	5:16
5.	"Moving On"	5:37
6.	"Mama (I Will Be Back)"	4:02
7.	"(I Feel) Pata Pata"	4:38
8.	"Fatima/Obinkabimame"	6:51
Total length:		40:37
