= Osibisa (album) =

Studio album by Osibisa
- Released: June 1971
- Recorded: 1971
- Studios: Advision Studios, London
- Length: 41:36
- Labels: MCA, Decca
- Producer: Tony Visconti

Osibisa chronology
Osibisa (1971)	Woyaya (1971)

Professional ratings
Review scores
Source	Rating
AllMusic	4.5/5 stars
Christgau's Record Guide	B

Osibisa is the self-titled debut album by British afro rock band Osibisa, released in June 1971 by MCA. It was reissued in 2004 as a two-CD pack together with Woyaya by BGO Records.

== Track listing ==
No.	Title	Writer(s)	Length
1.	"The Dawn"	Osei, Amarfio	7:24
2.	"Music for Gong Gong"	Osei, Tontoh	5:27
3.	"Ayiko Bia"	Osei	7:52
4.	"Akwaaba"	Osei, Tontoh	4:19
5.	"Oranges"	Osei	4:43
6.	"Phallus C"	Bedeau	7:15
7.	"Think About the People"	Osibisa	4:36
Total length:			41:36

== Personnel ==
Osibisa

- Teddy Osei – tenor saxophone, flute, African drums, percussion, lead vocals on "The Dawn", "Music for Gong Gong" and "Ayiko Bia"
- Sol Amarfio – drums, percussion, vocals
- Mac Tontoh – trumpet, flugelhorn, kabasa, percussion, vocals
- Spartacus R (Roy Bedeau) – bass guitar, assorted percussion
- Wendell Richardson – lead guitar, lead vocals on "Think About the People"
- Robert Bailey – organ, piano, timbales, percussion, vocals
- Loughty Lasisi Amao – tenor saxophone, baritone saxophone, congas, percussion

== Production ==
- Tony Visconti - producer
- Roy Baker - engineer
- John Punter - engineer
- Martin Rushent - assistant engineer
- Roger Dean - cover illustration, Osibisa logo
- Roughedge - cover design

== Charts ==
=== Weekly charts ===
Weekly chart performance for Osibisa
Chart (1971)	Peak position
Australian Albums (Kent Music Report)	13
Canada Top Albums/CDs (RPM)	47
Dutch Albums (Album Top 100)	8
Norwegian Albums (VG-lista)	21
UK Albums (Official Charts)	11
US Billboard 200	55

=== Year-end charts ===
Year-end chart performance for Osibisa
Chart (1971)	Position
Dutch Albums (Album Top 100)	64
