= Welcome Home (Osibisa album) =

Studio album by Osibisa
- Released: 1975
- Recorded: 1975
- Length: 40:50
- Label: Bronze Records (UK); Island Records (U.S.)
- Producer: Gerry Bron

Osibisa chronology
Osibirock (1974)	Welcome Home (1975)	Ojah Awake (1976)

Full front cover
- Original vinyl full cover

Alternative cover
- 1992 Uhuru CD cover

Welcome Home is the seventh studio album by British Afro rock band Osibisa released in 1975 by Island Records ILPS 9355. Issued on CD in 1992 under the title Uhuru by Soundwings and in 1997 by Red Steel Music Ltd. RMC 0208.

== Track listing ==
No.	Title	Writer(s)	Length
1.	"Sunshine Day"	Sol Amarfio, Teddy Osei, Mac Tontoh	4:59
2.	"Welcome Home"	Amarfio, Osei, Tontoh	4:19
3.	"Densu"	Traditional	5:23
4.	"Choboi (Heave Ho!)"	Amarfio, Osei, Tontoh	5:08
5.	"Do It (Like It Is)"	Amarfio, Osei, Tontoh	4:24
6.	"Right Now"	Amarfio, Osei, Tontoh	3:11
7.	"Seaside - Meditation"	Amarfio, Kiki Gyan, Osei, Tontoh	5:16
8.	"Uhuru"	Amarfio, Osei, Tontoh	3:28
9.	"Kolomashie"	Traditional	4:39
Total length:			40:50

Bonus track on Uhuru, 1992 Soundwings CD release
No.	Title	Writer(s)	Length
10.	"The Dawn"	Osei, Amarfio	6:25

Bonus tracks on 1997 Red Steel Music Ltd. CD release
No.	Title	Writer(s)	Length
10.	"Bum to Bum"	Amarfio, Kofi Ayivor, Gyan, Osei, Tontoh	5:42
11.	"Agoro"		4:01
12.	"Sunshine Day (single edit)"	Amarfio, Osei, Tontoh	3:13

== Personnel ==
- Teddy Osei – African drums, flute, percussion, tenor and soprano saxophones, vocals
- Mac Tontoh – trumpet, flugelhorn, percussion, didjeridu, prensa
- Sol Amarfio – drums, percussion, bells, bongos, congas
- Kofi Ayivor – congas, percussion
- Kiki Gyan – clavinet, keyboards, organ, piano, vocals
- Mike Odumusu – bass guitar, vocals
- Wendell Richardson – guitar, acoustic guitar, lead vocals
- Ray Allen – vibraphone
- Robert Bailey – vibraphone
- Barbara Thompson – vibraphone
- Jean-Karl Dikoto Mandengue – bass guitar on "Uhuru"
- Paul Golly – rhythm guitars on "Uhuru"
- Producer – Gerry Bron
- Engineer – Ashley Howe
- Recorded at the Roundhouse Recording Studios, London
- Cover painting – Ian Emes
- Remastering – Mike Brown & Robert M Corich

== Charts ==
Chart (1975–1976)	Peak position
Australian Albums (Kent Music Report)	75
US Billboard 200	200
