= BLO =

BLO or Blo may refer to:

- Barbie Liberation Organization, doll jammers
- Beltran-Leyva Organization or Beltrán-Leyva Cartel, Mexican criminal organization
- Boiled linseed oil
- Boston Lyric Opera, United States, an opera company
- Blaydon railway station, Blaydon-on-Tyne, England, National Rail station code
- Blo (band), a Nigerian psychedelic funk ensemble
- Blonduos Airport, IATA code
- British Liaison Officers, liaison officers sent by the British Special Operations Executive into Nazi-occupied Europe to contact resistance groups
