= Super Fly T.N.T. =

1973 film by Ron O'Neal

- Film poster by John Solie
- Directed by: Ron O'Neal
- Screenplay by: Alex Haley
- Story by: Ron O'Neal; Sig Shore
- Produced by: Sig Shore
- Starring: Ron O'Neal; Roscoe Lee Browne; Sheila Frazier; Robert Guillaume; Jacques Sernas; William Berger
- Cinematography: Robert Gaffney; James Signorelli
- Edited by: Bob Brady
- Music by: Osibisa
- Production company: Superfly Ltd.
- Distributed by: Paramount Pictures
- Release date: June 15, 1973
- Running time: 87 minutes
- Country: United States
- Budget: $1.5 million

Super Fly T.N.T. is a 1973 American blaxploitation crime drama film directed by and starring Ron O'Neal. O'Neal reprises his role of Youngblood Priest from the 1972 film Super Fly. The film was both a critical and commercial failure.

The film was released on VHS in 1993 and on Blu-ray in 2025. The film was shot in Rome, Italy and other locations such as Senegal. A sequel, The Return of Superfly, was released in 1990, with Nathan Purdee as Priest.

== Plot ==
Youngblood Priest and Georgia are now living in Rome, having relocated from New York City. Priest drops Georgia off and when she goes to the place, she meets a black American man named Jordan who recognizes her from New York City. Priest meanwhile has been feeling bored in Rome, so he plays poker games with Italian businessmen every day to entertain himself. In one of the games, Priest has a run-in with Dr. Lamine Sonko, whose country of Umbria was destroyed by battle tanks and who came here to talk to Priest, however he ignores him.

Priest then has a dinner engagement with Georgia, Jordan and his girlfriend, Lisa and after they talk, Jordan starts singing, much to the dismay of Priest.

Georgia tells Priest that she wants children and to start a family, but Priest refuses. He then meets Jordan the next morning and they talk about their previous lives in New York City, with Priest mentioning a little bit about him being a drug dealer. After he has a horse riding lesson, Priest meets Dr. Sonko, however they’re attacked by an assassin, but Dr. Sonko manages to subdue him in time.

Priest and the doctor go to Priest’s place, where they talk about Umbria, Priest refuses to help dr. Sonko however and he leaves. Priest then realizes that dr. Sonko was right about Umbria and tells Georgia that he’s going there, which makes her angry. The next morning, Priest arrives in Umbria, and then back in Rome, decides to help Dr. Sonko. In one of his casino games, he talks to one of the businessmen, Matty Smith, to help him with the weapons.

Matty agrees and the next morning, Priest says goodbye to Georgia and Dr. Sonko before he boards the plane. After landing however, he is betrayed by the people and detained by soldiers in the airport, who bring them to their commander and beat him up before keeping him in a jail cell.

The commander then calls Dr. Sonko, and Priest overhears how the poor doctor has to accept defeat from the soldiers. The commander then leaves, and one of his henchmen goes to check on Priest, but is electrocuted by him. The other henchman also goes to check, but he is also killed, being beaten to death by Priest.

Priest then leaves the cell into the daylight and finds himself in the middle of a circle of Africans. Priest then returns from Umbria, and reunites with Georgia.

== Cast ==
- Ron O'Neal as "Youngblood" Priest
- Roscoe Lee Browne Dr. Lamine Sonko
- Sheila Frazier as Georgia
- Robert Guillaume as Jordan Gaines
- Jacques Sernas as Matty Smith
- William Berger as Lefebre
- Silvio Noto as George, Restaurant Proprietor
- Olga Bisera as Lisa
- Federico Boido as Rik, Mercenary
- Dominic Barto as Rand
- Minister Dem as General
- Jeannie McNeil as Riding Instructress
- Luigi Orso as Crew Chief

== Soundtrack ==
Super Fly T.N.T.

Soundtrack album by Osibisa
- Released: September 24, 1973
- Recorded: April 1973
- Length: 45:57
- Label: Buddah Records
- Producer: Peter Gallen

Osibisa chronology
Heads (1972)	Super Fly T.N.T. (1973)	Happy Children (1973)

Professional ratings
Review scores
Source	Rating
Allmusic	link

The soundtrack was done by English/African/Caribbean band Osibisa and charted at #159 on the Billboard charts and #41 on R&B albums. It has been re-issued on CD by Red Steel Music with bonus tracks in 1995.

=== Track listing ===
All songs arranged, performed and composed by Osibisa.

No.	Title	Length
1.	"T.N.T."	6:51
2.	"Superfly Man"	3:56
3.	"Prophets"	5:25
4.	"The Vicarage"	3:32
5.	"Oye Mama"	3:26
6.	"Brotherhood"	4:12
7.	"Come Closer (If You're A Man)"	5:23
8.	"Kelele"	5:37
9.	"La Ila La La"	7:35
Total length:		45:57

=== Musicians ===
Teddy Osei, from Ghana; - tenor sax, flute, African drums & vocals
Sol Amarfio, from Ghana; - drums
Mac Tontoh, from Ghana; - trumpet, flugel horn, kabasa
Jean Mandengue, from the French Cameroons; – bass guitar, percussion, vocals
Gordon Hunte, from Guyana; - lead guitar & vocals
Robert Bailey, from Trinidad; - organ, piano, timbales
Kofi Ayivor, from Ghana; - congas, African drums, percussion, vocals

Additional brass arrangements by Mike Gibbs

== Release ==
The film was to be released by Warner Bros. but they dropped the film a month before it was due to be released due to concerns about unfavourable reaction from certain groups, similar to that received by the original.

The film premiered in New York City on June 15, 1973, which was boycotted by members of the Congress of Racial Equality.

== In popular culture ==
- In the 1994 film Pulp Fiction, Jules Winnfield, portrayed by Samuel L. Jackson (who acts in The Return of Superfly), says to John Travolta's Vincent Vega, "Every time my fingers touch brain, I'm Super Fly T.N.T. I'm the Guns of the Navarone [sic]."
