= Black Magic Night =

Live album by Osibisa
- Released: 1977
- Recorded: 19 July 1977
- Venue: Royal Festival Hall (London)
- Length: 1:24:43
- Label: Bronze Records
- Producer: Gerry Bron

Osibisa chronology
Ojah Awake (1976)	Black Magic Night (1977)	Mystic Energy (1980)

Black Magic Night (Live at the Royal Festival Hall) is a live double album by British Afro rock band Osibisa recorded at the Royal Festival Hall on 19 July 1977 with live versions of songs from their previous albums. Released in 1977 by Bronze Records (BRON 506) and reissued as 2-CD set in 1993 on CD format by Castle Communications (CBC 8046).

== Track listing ==
CD 1
No.	Title	Writer(s)	Length
1.	"The Dawn"	Osei, Amarfio	8:19
2.	"Welcome Home"	Osei, Tontoh, Amarfio	4:30
3.	"Ayiko Bia"	Osei	7:33
4.	"Living Loving Feeling"	Osei, Tontoh, Amarfio	5:58
5.	"Woyaya"	Amarfio	6:46
6.	"Spirits Up Above"	Roland Kirk	7:50
Total length:			40:56

CD 2
No.	Title	Writer(s)	Length
1.	"Kelele"	Osei, Tontoh, Amarfio, Ayivor, Mandengue	7:49
2.	"Fire"	Osei, Tontoh, Amarfio, Ayivor, Mandengue	7:01
3.	"Music for Gong Gong"	Osei, Tontoh	8:01
4.	"Beautiful Seven – Y Sharp"	Osei, Tontoh, Amarfio, Richardson, Bedeau, Bailey, Amao	8:32
5.	"Sunshine Day"	Osei, Tontoh, Amarfio	7:16
6.	"Encore – Survival"	Osei, Tontoh	5:08
Total length:			43:47

== Personnel ==
- Teddy Osei – tenor and soprano saxophones, flute, African drums, lead vocals
- Mac Tontoh – trumpet, flugelhorn, kabassa, bells, rattles, African xylophone, vocals
- Sol (Rhythm Man) Amarfio – drums, cowbells, congas, vocals
- Wendell Richardson – guitars, Dondo drum, lead vocals
- Mike Odumosu – bass guitar, bells, vocals
- Robert Bailey – keyboards
- Daku (Potato) Adams – congas, percussion
- Sonia Lekhela – backing vocals
- Ntobi Mdudu – backing vocals
- Tiny Conco – backing vocals
- Linda Conco – backing vocals

== Production ==
- Recorded at the Royal Festival Hall, London on 19 July 1977 with the Rolling Stones Mobile Studio
- Mixed at the Roundhouse Recording Studio, London
- Produced by Gerry Bron
- Engineered by Ashley Howe
- P.A. Mix by Tony Meape
- Photography by Steve Lewis
- Art Direction by Paul Bevoir
- Cover by David Shortt
- Artwork by Leaderline Artists
- Compilation Remastering by Robert M. Corich and John Dawson Reed
