= Laolu Akins =

Nigerian music producer

Olaolu Akintobi, popularly known as Laolu Akins (born November 1946) is a Nigerian music producer. He has worked with artists such as Shina Peters, Onyeka Onwenu, Adewale Ayuba, Mike Okri and Christy Essien-Igbokwe. He has produced Shina Peters albums Ace (1989), Shinamania (1990), Dancing Time (1991), and Experience (1992), and Adewale Ayuba's Bubble (1991), Play For Me (1992), and several other albums. He was supervising producer for the maiden recording of hip-hop duo P-Square, titled "Where Were You Last Night".

== Biography ==
=== Early career ===
Laolu Akins learned to play the drums at a Lagos City Youth Sports & Social Centre, financed by the then Federal Ministry Of Youth and Sports in Yaba, Lagos. Later, he played regularly with friends from high school, in groups like Oscars, Clusters, the Akinrele Brothers, and Seinde Sapara Ade Jolaoso before teaming with Berkley "Ike" Jones and Mike "Gbenga" Odumosu. The trio were influenced by British and American rock groups and soul music, and soon combined with the Lijadu Sisters to start a group called Afro-Collection, with Tee Mac Iseli. When Ginger Baker moved to Nigeria in 1971, he organized a band called Salt, with Laolu Akins as drummer. Salt played in Lagos clubs, and later toured Europe and America with Ginger Baker.

=== Blo ===
Upon their return, Laolu co-founded a group called Blo (standing for 'Berkeley, Laolu & Odumosu'). The band recorded afro-rock songs such as "Preacher Man" and "Native Doctor". Blo recorded their first album, Chapter One, a psychedelic rock record under the EMI label. Sales of the album did not meet EMI's expectations, and the band eventually left EMI to record their next album with Decca on their Afrodisia label. Between 1974 and 1976 the band released three more records, Phase II, Step Three and Phase IV. Odumosu left to join OsibiIn after their recording of the Phase II album. In the summer of 1976, Blo moved to the United Kingdom under the management of Cliff Cooper and Velvet Music, and was based there till late 1982 when they returned to Nigeria. On return to Nigeria, Blo, now with Lemmy Out Jackson as the new 'O' of BLO, recorded "Back In Time" as a maxi single. After disappointing sales, Akins travelled to England and learned music production at the Orange Production Centre.

=== Later life ===
Akins founded BLO Productions, to produce records for a number of successful artists such as Christy Essien Igbokwe, Kris Okotie and Onyeka Onwenu. Between 1989 and 1998, Akins worked as an A&R controller with Sony Music Entertainment. He owns a music studio in Ikeja with the name G & A Studio, which he now uses to mentor upcoming artists and train young producers.
