= Jambo (album) =

Compilation album by Osibisa
- Released: 1992
- Recorded: 1989
- Length: 47:07
- Label: Soundwings Records

Osibisa chronology
Ayiko Bia (1992)	Jambo (1992)	Gold (1992)

Jambo is a compilation album by British Afro rock band Osibisa released in 1992 by Soundwings Records (MC-102.1079-2) and distributed by Serenade S.A., Barcelona, Spain. This album is a re-release of 1989 vinyl album Movement issued by German label in-akustik, in-akustik under 89021 LP catalog number.

The title comes from "Jambo!" a greeting in the Swahili language.

== Track listing ==
No.	Title	Writer(s)	Length
1.	"Ko Ko Rio Ko"	Osei, Tontoh, Masekele, Kabaka	3:53
2.	"Pata Pata"	Makeba, Ragovoy, Osei	5:47
3.	"The Lion’s Walk"	Osei, Tontoh	4:59
4.	"Inkosi Sikeleli Africa"	Osei, Tontoh	4:35
5.	"Mouvements"	Tontoh, Brikett	4:38
6.	"Drums 2001 Carnival"	Osei, Tontoh, Amarfio, Adams	3:33
7.	"Jambo"	Osei	4:03
8.	"Life"	Osei, Tontoh	3:41
9.	"Happy Feeling Rhymes"	Osei, Tontoh, Amarfio, Adams	2:31
10.	"Living, Loving Feeling"	Osei, Amarfio, Tontoh	5:25
11.	"Survival"	Osei, Tontoh	4:02
Total length:			47:07

== Original release ==
Original 1989 LP release by in-akustik, in-akustik

Side A:

1. Ko Ko Rio Ko
2. Pata Pata
3. The Lion’s Walk
4. Inkosi Sikeleli Africa

Side B:

1. Movements
2. Drums 2001 Carnival
3. Jambo
4. Life
5. Happy Feeling Rhymes
