= Original Gangstas =

1996 film directed by Larry Cohen

- Theatrical release poster
- Directed by: Larry Cohen
- Written by: Aubrey K. Rattan
- Produced by: Wolf Schmidt; Fred Williamson
- Starring: Fred Williamson; Jim Brown; Pam Grier; Paul Winfield; Isabel Sanford; Ron O'Neal; Richard Roundtree
- Cinematography: Carlos González
- Edited by: Peter B. Ellis; David Kern
- Music by: Vladimir Horunzhy
- Production company: Po' Boy Productions
- Distributed by: Orion Pictures
- Release date: May 10, 1996
- Running time: 99 minutes
- Country: United States
- Language: English
- Budget: $3.6 million
- Box office: $4,000,000 (US)

Original Gangstas is a 1996 action-gangster film filmed and set in urban Gary, Indiana starring Blaxploitation film stars such as Fred Williamson, Pam Grier, Jim Brown, Richard Roundtree, and Ron O'Neal. It is the final film directed by Larry Cohen before his death in 2019, though he continued to write screenplays through 2010.

The film details the deteriorating state of an impoverished Gary neighborhood terrorized by a street gang called the Rebels. When the gang murders a local boy, it prompts the emergence of several individuals who grew up in the neighborhood: the original members of the Rebels.

== Plot ==
The movie opens to a narration (by Ron O'Neal) detailing the poor economic state of a gang-ridden Gary, Indiana. The narrator explains to the audience of how the city came into such a state. After the opening narrative, the scene switches to the base of operations for the Rebels, a local street gang, and a one-on-one basketball game between a Rebels gang member and a local boy named Kenny Thompson. Kenny humiliates the Rebel by winning and taking the gambled winnings as his own. After he leaves, Spyro, the current co-leader of the Rebels (opposite Damien) is under the impression that Kenny's skills are something more than "something he picked up." He instructs his lieutenant, Kayo, to exact retribution on Kenny for being hustled.

While Kenny and his friend Marcus are relaxing at a diner, Kenny decides to call his girlfriend. He enters a phone booth to make the call but is subsequently shot and killed by Kayo in a drive-by shooting. The owners of the grocery store, Marvin Bookman and Gracie Bookman, two members of the community well-respected by both the Rebels and local citizens, feel that justice should be brought to Kenny's murderer and discloses the license plate number of the shooter's vehicle.

When the Rebels discover this, Spyro orders Kayo to dispose of the vehicle. Kayo and the Rebels then proceed to confront Marvin about his assistance to the investigators of Kenny's death. Marvin argues that Kenny was a good person and did not deserve to be shot. The co-leaders of the Rebels describe how they respected the Bookmans' store and, while others around it were robbed and ransacked, their store was left alone. The fact that Marvin would "sell them out" expresses a high amount of disrespect to the Rebels, who immediately seek revenge on Marvin. Eventually, Kayo and initiate Bobby, with a group of fellow Rebels, attack the grocery store, resulting in the near-fatal shooting of Marvin by Bobby.

The attack on Marvin's life prompts his son, pro football coach and ex-Rebel John Bookman, to return to the impoverished Gary neighborhood to find Bobby. After seeing his father, John goes to save his father's shop and kicks all the Rebels members out of there. Then he goes to a local barbershop, where Kayo eventually turns up. Trouble immediately brews, and John and the gang members fight. John has the upper hand but is overpowered. Jake Trevor, another original Rebel, enters the fray and saves John. After the fight, the two converse, and it is revealed that Jake is here to bury Kenny, who was his illegitimate son. Jake goes to visit "Slick", who reveals to Jake that his son was killed because he hustled the Rebels. Jake is astounded and enraged that his son was killed over money.

The next day, John and Jake attend Kenny's funeral, where a distraught Laurie Thompson is reunited with her ex-husband. While talking, Laurie implores Jake to reconsider seeking vengeance upon his son's murderers, expressing her disdain by stating that he always wishes to resolve such issues by fighting, which "only makes things worse". John tells Jake that he has a meeting with the Rebels at the church that makes Jake and Laurie disappointed at him. Jake confronts Spyro at the basketball court about Kenny Thompson. After failed treaty negotiations at the church and the rising of neighborhood gang violence, the other gangs (Diablos and Rangers) have a meeting with Spyro, Damien and the Rebels about Kenny and about their wrongful actions in the neighborhood. At the party for the Rebels, John and Jake drive Spyro and Damien's car into Diablo territory and shoot at them to set up a broken truce. Spyro and Damien kill Rafael and Dink in retaliation for joining John, the Rebels light the community houses on fire with Molotov cocktails. John and Jake receive help from their former gang mates in Laurie, Slick and Bubba, while Kenny's friend Marcus also joins them in their fight. They devise a plan to "lose" a trunk of weapons to the Rebels. When the gang tries to use said weapons, the guns malfunction and explode in their faces, stunning the gang. In another area, the Rebels are attempting to escape the battle, but they are stopped by a group of community members, armed with bats and other improvised weapons. Eventually, Spyro and Damien fear they may lose the fight, and escape to the old steel mill, with Jake and John set on catching them. In their absence, Laurie successfully guns down Kayo, killing him, and finally avenging Kenny's death. Eventually, Jake and John reach the steel mill, each taking on Spyro and Damien separately as Diablo members watch on. After an intense hand-to-hand fight between Jake and Spyro, Spyro causes Jake to hesitate as he tells him he also didn't know his father, and that he's basically Jake's son; that Jake created him and now he wants to kill him. Jake then kills Spyro. After Spyro is taken down by Jake, Blood, the leader of the Diablos and a few cohorts shoot a battered Damien, destroying the Rebel leadership. After refusing to forge a truce with the Diablos, Jake and John walk off as officers pour into the scene.

== Cast ==
- Fred Williamson as John Bookman
- Jim Brown as Jake Trevor
- Pam Grier as Laurie Thompson
- Paul Winfield as Reverend Dorsey
- Isabel Sanford as Gracie Bookman
- Oscar Brown Jr. as Marvin Bookman
- Richard Roundtree as "Slick"
- Ron O'Neal as Bubba
- Christopher B. Duncan as "Spyro"
- Eddie Bo Smith Jr. as Damien
- Dru Down as "Kayo"
- Kevin Watson as Bobby
- Shyheim Franklin as "Dink"
- Robert Forster as Detective Slatten
- Charles Napier as The Mayor
- Wings Hauser as Michael Casey
- Frank Pesce as Detective Watts
- Godfrey Danchimah as Marcus
- Seraiah Carol as Thelma Jones
- Dawn Stern as "Princess"
- Timothy Lewis as Kenny Thompson
- Linda Marie Bright as Lisa Bookman

== Reception ==
The film had mixed reviews. The film holds a 53% rating on Rotten Tomatoes based on 15 reviews.

=== Box office ===
The movie debuted at the US box office at No.9.

Because Orion Pictures ultimately went bankrupt, Williamson, who was also one of the producers, was not able to realize any profits and many expenses came out of his pocket.

== Soundtrack ==
A soundtrack containing hip hop and R&B music was released on April 30, 1996, by Noo Trybe/Virgin/EMI. It peaked at #41 on the Billboard 200 and #8 on the Top R&B/Hip-Hop Albums.

== Television airings ==
The movie was a very popular staple, either on Showtime, Encore, or Starz, Encore's sister network. For broadcast television (both station and network), the movie, especially in the late 1990s, was constantly aired on UPN, which was at the height of its popularity from 1995 to 2002, and constantly beating The WB in the ratings. It also aired on its stations, though in New York, it aired on WNYW in 1998, although it could have aired on WWOR too, at later dates. On cable TV, it also was a big hit on BET. Unlike the usual promoters, HBO, and even moreso Cinemax, this movie's first behind-the-scene promotional featurette was either on Showtime, Encore, or Starz.

== Note ==
In later years, in the late 2000s, the movie was rereleased on home entertainment media (Blu-ray and DVD) by Warner Home Video, making this movie a Warner Bros. movie to some degree. Orion was originally a Warner Bros. company and its movies were similar to Warner Bros. movies throughout the 1980s.
