= The Sophisticated Gents =

- Genre: Drama
- Based on: The Junior Bachelor Society by John A. Williams
- Screenplay by: Melvin Van Peebles
- Story by: Phyllis Minoff
- Directed by: Harry Falk
- Starring: Sonny Jim Gaines; Bernie Casey; Rosey Grier; Robert Hooks; Ron O'Neal; Thalmus Rasulala; Raymond St. Jacques; Melvin Van Peebles; Dick Anthony Williams; Paul Winfield
- Country of origin: United States
- Original language: English

Production
- Executive producer: Daniel Wilson
- Producers: Linda Feitelson; Fran Sears; Melvin Van Peebles
- Cinematography: Terry K. Meade
- Editor: Betsy Blankett Milicevic
- Running time: 200 minutes

Original release
- Network: NBC
- Release: September 29 – October 1, 1981

The Sophisticated Gents is a TV miniseries that aired on three consecutive nights from September 29 to October 1, 1981, on NBC. Its ensemble cast featured a number of African-American stage and film actors, many of whom were customarily seen in blaxploitation films in the 1970s. The miniseries is based upon the 1976 novel The Junior Bachelor Society by John A. Williams. Although production of the project ended in 1979, NBC did not air the miniseries until almost two years later.

== Cast ==
- Sonny Jim Gaines - Coach Charles "Chappie" Davis
- Bernie Casey - Shurley Walker
- Rosey Grier - Cudjo Evers
- Robert Hooks - Ezra "Chops" Jackson
- Ron O'Neal - Clarence "Claire" Henderson
- Thalmus Rasulala - Kenneth "Snake" Dobson
- Raymond St. Jacques - D'Artagnan "Dart" Parks
- Melvin Van Peebles - Walter "Moon" Porter
- Dick Anthony Williams - Ralph Joplin
- Paul Winfield - Richard "Bubbles" Wiggins
- Albert Hall - Det. Swoop Ferguson
- Lynn Benisch - Renee Marcus
- Rosalind Cash - Christine Jackson
- Ja'net Dubois - Onetha Wiggins
- Alfre Woodard - Evelyn Evers
- Joanna Miles - Sandra Dobson
- Janet MacLachlan - Diane Walker
- Bibi Besch - Simone Parks
- Denise Nicholas - Pat Henderson
- Marlene Warfield - Lil Joplin
- Beah Richards - Mae Porter
- Stymie Beard - Mickey Mouse
- Mario Van Peebles - Nicholas Dobson
- René LeVant - Himself

== Plot summary ==
In the mid-1940s, Coach Charles "Chappie" Davis (Gaines) founded a sports club for African-American boys in the local community, dubbing them "The Sophisticated Gents". The young men became athletic heroes, and formed a lifetime bond with each other and their coach. Twenty-five years later, those members of the Gents remaining in town decide to hold a testimonial dinner for Chappie, who is now 70 years old. The dinner turns into an impromptu reunion, with nine Gents eventually arriving to honor Chappie. However, the legal troubles of one of the Gents could spell danger for all of them and their wives.

== Video releases ==
On June 3, 1992, the miniseries was released on VHS.
