= Babá Ken Okulolo =

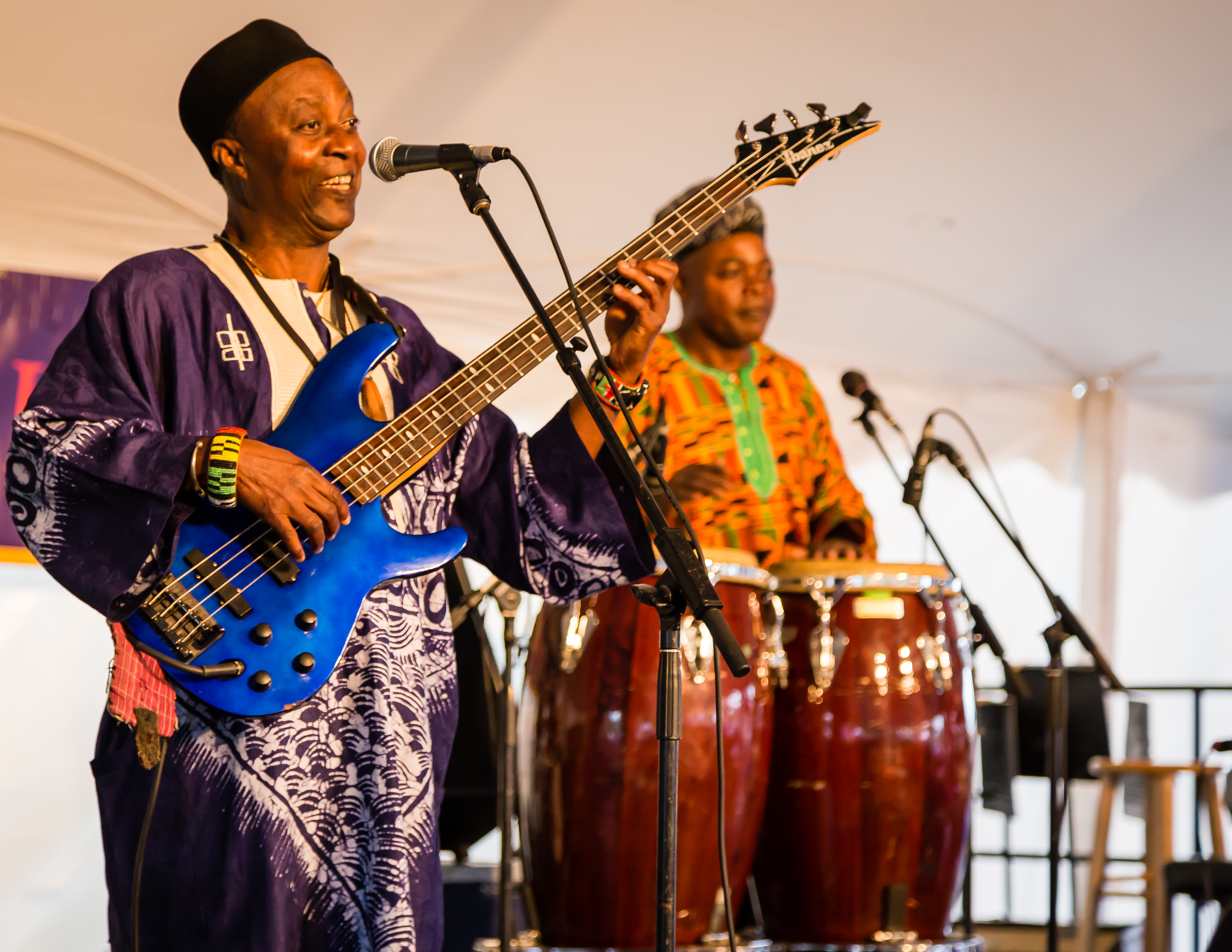
- The West African Highlife Band 2014 by Mobilus In Mobili

Background information
- Born: September 12, 1950; Aladja, Delta State, Nigeria
- Genres: traditional, Afrobeat, Afrorock, highlife
- Occupations: Musician, instructor
- Instruments: Bass guitar, drums, vocals
- Label: Inner Spirit Records
- Website: babaken.com

Babá Ken Okulolo (born September 12, 1950) is a Nigerian bassist and bandleader who was first seen in the U.S. in 1985 with King Sunny Ade's world-touring band. He has played with renowned Afrobeat creator Fela Anikulapo Kuti, highlife master Victor Olaiya, and was a founder of the Afro-rock group MonoMono in the 1970s. Now based in the San Francisco Bay Area, he leads four bands that represent his various musical specialties: Kotoja (an international Afro-funk band); the Nigerian Brothers (traditional folk music); the West African Highlife Band (highlife hits of yesteryear); and the Afro-Beat Connexion (modern Afrobeat collaboration with other African and American musicians). Babá Ken has also headlined such venues as Lincoln Center, The Fillmore, The Warfield, LACMA, the Oakland Coliseum, Yoshi's, The Greek Theater, and the Great American Music Hall.

== Discography ==
=== Albums ===
- 1976 – Ken Okulolo Talkin' Bass Experience (E.M.I Nigeria Ltd)
- 1990 – Babá Ken and Kotoja Freedom Is What Every Body Needs (Inner Spirit Records)
- 1991 – Babá Ken and Kotoja Freedom Is What Every Body Needs (Mesa/Blue Moon Recordings (Re-Issued))
- 1992 – Kotoja "Sawale" (Mesa/Blue Moon Recordings Inc.)
- 1994 – Kotoja "Super Sawale" (Putumayo World Music)
- 1998 – West African Highlife Band Salute To Highlife Pioneers (Inner Spirit Recordings)
- 2001 – Babá Ken Okulolo & The Nigerian Brothers Songs From The Village (Inner Spirit Recordings)
- 2008 – Babá Ken Okulolo and the Afro Groove Connexion "Deep Down Beat" (Inner Spirit Recordings)
- 2009 – Babá Ken Okulolo "We Are All From Africa" (Inner Spirit Recordings)
- 2012 – Babá Ken Okulolo "African Drum Songs" (Inner Spirit Recordings)

=== Contributions ===
- 1971 – Monomono – Adele (E.M.I Nigeria Ltd)
- 1972 – Monomono – Give a Beggar a Chance (E.M.I Nigeria Ltd)
- 1973 – Monomono – Dawn of Awareness (E.M.I Nigeria Ltd)
- 1978 – Emma Dorgu We Need Freedom (E.M.I Nigeria Ltd)
- 1979 – Tee Mac Collections Wake Up (E.M.I Nigeria Ltd)
- 1983 – Orlando Julius Ekemode Dance Afro-Beat (Afrobeat Recordings Inc.)
- 1995 – King Sunny Ade E Dide/Get Up (Mesa/Blue Moon Recordings)
- 1996 – Bata Ketu Bata Ketu (Bembé Records)
- 1998 – Chalo Eduardo "Samba Nova" (Carnaval Records)
- 1998 – King Sunny Ade Odu (Atlantic/Mesa Recordings)
- 2003 – Kelly Takunda Orphan "Give It to the People" (All of One Records)
- 2016 - Santana IV "Freedom in Your Mind" (Santana IV Records)
