= Kiki Gyan =

Musical artist (7June 1957–6 June 2004)

- Also known as: Kiki Djan
- Born: Kofi Kwarko Gyan; 7 June 1957; Takoradi, Ghana
- Died: 6 June 2004 (aged 46)
- Genres: Disco, funk, reggae
- Occupations: Musician, songwriter, multi-instrumentalist, records producer
- Instruments: keyboards, others
- Years active: 1970–1985
- Labels: P.V.P. Records, Boom Records, Top Records

Kiki Gyan (7 June 1957 – 6 June 2004), also known as Kiki Djan, was a Ghanaian musician. He was the keyboardist of the band Osibisa which was popular in the 1970s. He also recorded and produced a series of disco records.

== Early life ==
Born into a middle-class family in Takoradi, Ghana, Gyan started playing the piano when he was five years old and went professional at the age of 12. He dropped out of secondary school at 14 and after a tour of London with a local Ghanaian band called Pagadija; he joined the UK-based Afro-rock group Osibisa after his talent was recognized by the brother of the band's founder. He was only 15 years old when he started playing with Osibisa in 1972, replacing the keyboardist who had just left, and he travelled internationally with the band during the 1970s, playing to large audiences around the world.

== Height of his career ==
By the age of 18, Gyan had made more than a million dollars, "had hung out with Elton John and Mick Jagger, played for Britain's Queen and cruised on champagne-drenched luxury ocean-liners to island-hop in the Caribbean". In 1977, he met Marvin Gaye, Peter Tosh, Stevie Wonder, and Third World during the FESTAC event in Nigeria. He left Osibisa to go solo in 1979 and recorded the single "24 Hours in a Disco", which hit the charts in the United States and the UK.

He was briefly married to Fela Kuti's first daughter, before divorcing to marry a Ghanaian woman. He has a daughter named Vanessa Gyan who now lives in Ghana with her son, Aaron.

== Later life and death ==
Gyan became addicted to hard drugs for some 21 years, to the detriment of his career. Kiki Gyan died alone and impoverished in a church bathroom in Ghana, the cause of death being AIDS and drug-related complications.

== Discography ==
=== With Osibisa ===
- Osibirock (1974)
- Welcome Home (1975)
- Ojah Awake (1976)

=== Solo ===
- Afro Reggae (1977)
- Feeling So Good (1979)
- Feelin' Alright (1983)

=== With KG Brothers ===
- Pretty Pretty Girls (1979) (as The Twins)
- Disco Train (1979) (as KG Band)
- You (1982)

=== Compilations ===
- 24 Hours In A Disco 1978–82 (2012)
