= Paul Winfield =

American actor (1939–2004)

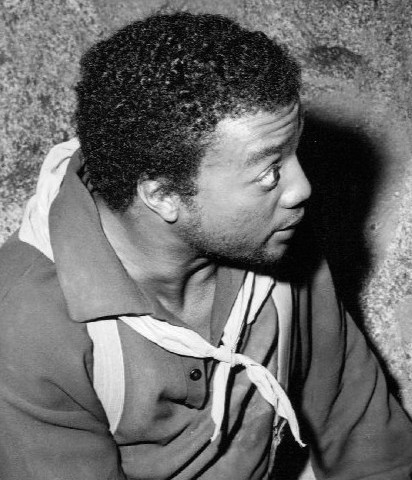
- Winfield in The High Chaparral (1969)
- Born: Paul Edward Winfield; May 22, 1939; Dallas, Texas, U.S.
- Died: March 7, 2004 (aged 64); Los Angeles, California, U.S.
- Resting place: Forest Lawn Memorial Park, Hollywood Hills, California, U.S.
- Other name: Paul E. Winfield
- Occupation: Actor
- Years active: 1965–2004
- Partner: Charles Gillan Jr. (1972–2002; Gillan's death)

Paul Edward Winfield (May 22, 1939 – March 7, 2004) was an American actor. He was known for his portrayal of a Louisiana sharecropper who struggles to support his family during the Great Depression in the landmark film Sounder (1972), which earned him an Academy Award for Best Actor nomination, making him the first openly gay nominee. Winfield portrayed Martin Luther King Jr. in the 1978 television miniseries King, for which he was nominated for an Emmy Award. Winfield was also known for his roles in Star Trek: The Next Generation, Star Trek II: The Wrath of Khan, The Terminator, L.A. Law,, the Magic Mirror in The Charmings, and Julian c. Barlow in the final season of 227. Winfield received four Emmy nominations overall, winning in 1995 for his 1994 guest role in Picket Fences.

== Early years ==
Winfield was the son of Lois Beatrice Edwards, a single mother who was a union organizer in the garment industry. Although published obituaries stated he was born on May 22, 1941 in Los Angeles, some sources indicate that Winfield was born on May 22, 1939 in Dallas, Texas. (Note: His grave marker at Forest Lawn Memorial Park (Hollywood Hills) gives his birth year as 1939, and the Social Security Index gives his place and date of birth as Dallas, Texas, on May 22, 1939.) His stepfather from the age of eight was Clarence Winfield, a city trash collector and construction worker. Winfield graduated from Manual Arts High School in Los Angeles. From there, he attended the University of Portland, 1957–59; Stanford University, 1959; Los Angeles City College, 1959–63; University of California, Los Angeles, 1962–64; University of Hawaiʻi, 1965 and the University of California, Santa Barbara, 1970–71, but did not earn a degree from any of them.

== Career ==
A lifetime member of The Actors Studio, Winfield carved out a diverse career in film, television, theater, and voiceovers by taking groundbreaking roles at a time when black actors were rarely even cast. He first appeared in the 1965 Perry Mason episode "The Case of the Runaway Racer" as Mitch, a race car mechanic. Winfield's first major feature film role was in the 1969 film The Lost Man starring Sidney Poitier. He became well known to TV audiences after appearing in several seasons of the groundbreaking television series Julia opposite Diahann Carroll. The show, filmed during a high point of racial tension in the U.S., was unique in featuring a black female as the central character. Winfield also starred as Martin Luther King Jr. in the 1978 miniseries King.

In 1973, Winfield was nominated for the Academy Award for Best Actor for the 1972 film Sounder; his co-star, Cicely Tyson, was nominated for Best Actress. Prior to their nominations and Diana Ross's for Lady Sings the Blues the same year, only three other black Americans – Dorothy Dandridge, Sidney Poitier and James Earl Jones – had ever been nominated for a leading role. Winfield also appeared in a different role in the 2003 Disney-produced TV remake of Sounder directed by Kevin Hooks, his co-star from the original. Winfield played "Jim the Slave" in Huckleberry Finn (1974), a musical based on the Mark Twain novel. He would recall later in his career, that as a young actor, he had played one of the leads in a local repertory production of Of Mice and Men in whiteface. At the time, a black actor playing the role would have been unthinkable. Winfield also starred in several miniseries, including Scarlett, and two based on the works of novelist Alex Haley: Roots: The Next Generations and Queen: The Story of an American Family.

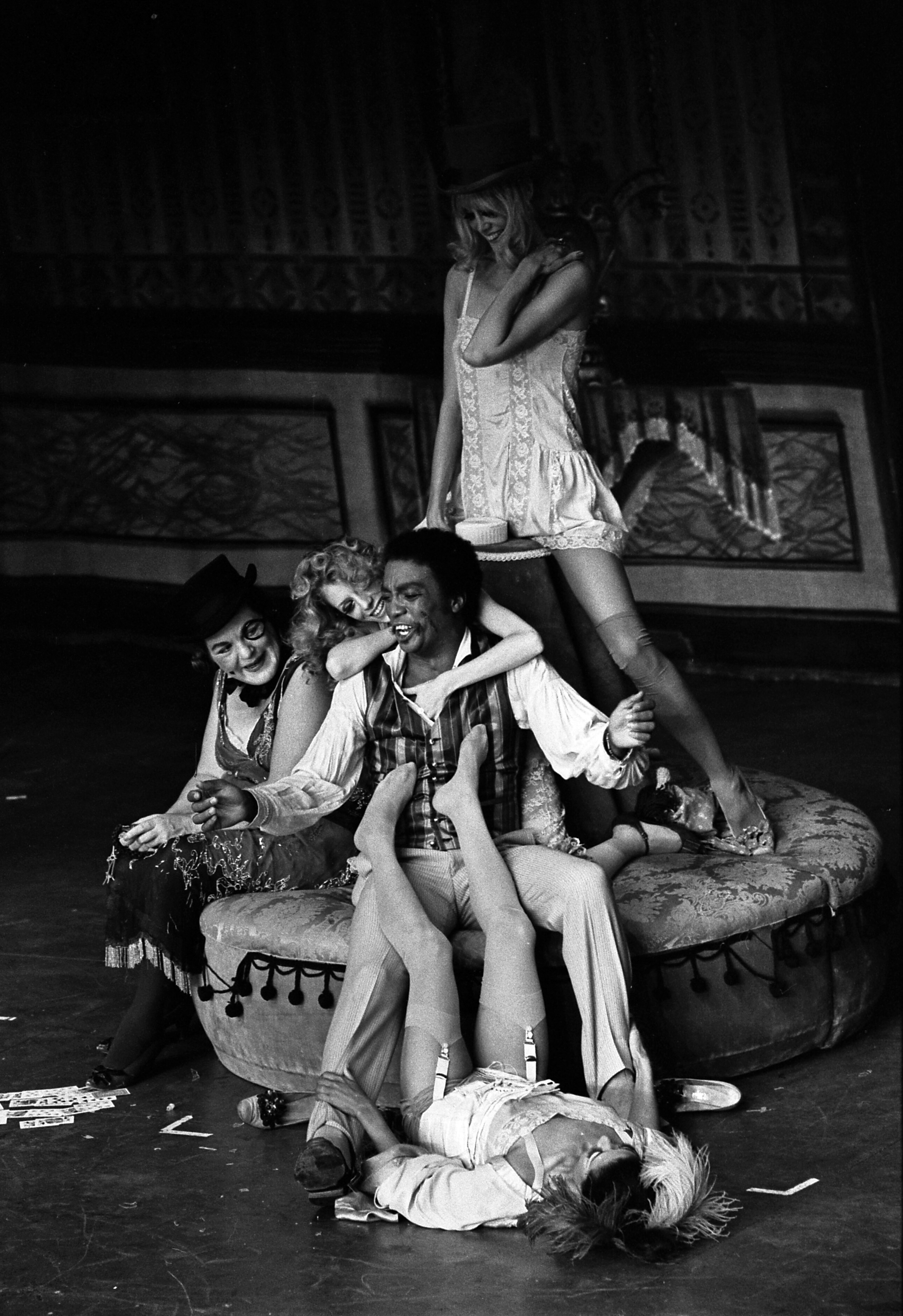
Winfield in a 1972 production of The Threepenny Opera

Winfield gained a new segment of fans for his brief but memorable roles in several science fiction television series and films. Winfield portrayed Starfleet starship Captain Terrell, an unwilling minion of the villain Khan, in Star Trek II: The Wrath of Khan, and Lieutenant Ed Traxler, a friendly but crusty cop partnered with Lance Henriksen in The Terminator. In 1996, he was in the 'name' ensemble cast in Tim Burton's comic homage to 1950s science fiction Mars Attacks!, playing the complacently self-satisfied Lt. General Casey. On the small screen, Winfield appeared in the Star Trek: The Next Generation episode "Darmok" as Dathon, an alien captain who communicates in allegories. He appeared in the second season Babylon 5 episode "Gropos" as General Richard Franklin, the father of regular character Dr. Stephen Franklin, and on the fairy tale sitcom The Charmings as the Evil Queen's wisecracking Magic Mirror. Winfield guest-starred as Deacon Malcolm Fisk in "The Sing-Off" episode of 227 and later joined the main cast in the final season as the snide and wealthy landlord Julian c. Barlow who stated that the "c" in his middle name was lower-cased by his mother who wanted to make it sound humble.

Winfield also took on roles as homosexual characters in the films Mike's Murder in 1984, and the 1998 film Relax...It's Just Sex. He found success off-camera due to his unique voice. Winfield provided voices for Spider-Man as Black Marvel, The Magic School Bus, Happily Ever After: Fairy Tales for Every Child, Gargoyles, Batman: The Animated Series, Batman Beyond, K10C, and The Simpsons as the Don King parody Lucius Sweet. In his voiceover career, Winfield is perhaps best known as narrator of the A&E true crime series City Confidential from 1998 until his death in 2004.

Throughout his career, Winfield frequently managed to perform in the theater. Checkmates (1988), his only Broadway production, co-starred Ruby Dee and was also the Broadway debut of Denzel Washington. Winfield appeared in productions at the Mark Taper Forum in Los Angeles and The Shakespeare Theatre in Washington, D.C. He was nominated for an Emmy Award for King and Roots: The Next Generations. In 1995, Winfield won an Emmy Award for Outstanding Guest Actor in a Drama Series for his appearance as Judge Harold Nance in the CBS drama Picket Fences.

== Personal life and death ==
Winfield was gay, but remained discreet about it in the public eye. Prior to coming out with his sexuality, Winfield lived with his Sounder co-star Cicely Tyson, for about 18 months in the early 1970s. She offered him a place to stay after he revealed that he was gay on set. Due to their living together, it was speculated that they were in a relationship. They never corrected the misconception. His partner of 30 years, architect Charles Gillan Jr., died of bone cancer on March 5, 2002.

Winfield long battled obesity and diabetes. On March 7, 2004, he died of a heart attack at Queen of Angels – Hollywood Presbyterian Medical Center in Los Angeles. Winfield and Gillan are interred together at Forest Lawn Memorial Park in Los Angeles.

== Filmography ==
Film
Year	Title	Role	Notes
1967	The Perils of Pauline	African Servant	Uncredited
1967	Who's Minding the Mint?	Garbage man	Uncredited
1969	The Lost Man	Orville Turner	
1970	R. P. M.	Steve Dempsey	
1971	Brother John	Henry Birkart	
1972	Sounder	Nathan Lee Morgan	
1972	Trouble Man	Chalky Price	
1973	Gordon's War	Gordon Hudson	
1974	Conrack	Mad Billy	
1974	Huckleberry Finn	Jim	
1975	Hustle	Sergeant Louis Belgrave	
1976	High Velocity	Watson	
1977	Twilight's Last Gleaming	Willis Powell	
1977	The Greatest	Lawyer	
1977	Damnation Alley	Keegan	
1978	A Hero Ain't Nothin' but a Sandwich	Butler	
1981	Carbon Copy	Bob Garvey	
1982	Star Trek II: The Wrath of Khan	Captain Clark Terrell	
1982	White Dog	Keys	
1983	On the Run	Harry	
1984	Mike's Murder	Philip Green	
1984	The Terminator	Lt. Ed Traxler	
1986	Blue City	Luther Reynolds	
1987	Death Before Dishonor	Ambassador	
1987	Big Shots	Johnnie Red	
1988	The Serpent and the Rainbow	Lucien Celine	
1990	Presumed Innocent	Judge Larren Lyttle	
1993	Cliffhanger	Walter Wright	
1993	Dennis the Menace	Chief of Police	
1994	The Killing Jar	Judge	Alternative title: Trapped
1995	In the Kingdom of the Blind, the Man with One Eye Is King	Papa Joe	
1995	In the Flesh	William Stone	
1996	Original Gangstas	Reverend Dorsey	Alternative title: Hot City
1996	Mars Attacks!	Lt. General Casey	
1996	Dead of Night	Vernon	
1996	The Legend of Gator Face	Bob	
1997	Strategic Command	Rowan	
1998	Relax...It's Just Sex	Auntie Mahalia	
1998	Assignment Berlin	Al Spector	
1999	Catfish in Black Bean Sauce	Harold Williams	
2000	Knockout	Ron Regent	
2001	Vegas, City of Dreams	Edgar Jones	
2002	Second to Die	Detective Grady	
Television
Year	Title	Role	Notes
1965	Perry Mason	Mitch	Episode: "The Case of the Runaway Racer"
1966	The Man from U.N.C.L.E.	Military M.P.	Episode: "The Minus x Affair"
1966	Daktari	Roy Kimba	2 episodes
1967	Cowboy in Africa	Kabutu	1 episode
1968	Death Valley Days	Bart	Episode: Bbread on the Desert"
1968	Mission: Impossible	Klaus	Episode: "Trial by Fury"
1968–1972	Ironside	Robert Phillips / Luther Benson	2 episodes
1969	Mannix	Walter Lucas	Episode: "Odds Against Donald Jordan"
1969	The High Chaparral	Graham Jessup	Episode: "Sea of Enemies"
1969	Room 222	Jim Williams	Episode: "Arizona State Loves You"
1969–1970	Julia	Paul Cameron	4 episodes
1970	The Young Rebels	Pompey	Episode: "Unbroken Chains"
1973	The Horror at 37,000 Feet	Dr. Enkalla	Television film
1974	It's Good to Be Alive	Roy Campanella	Television film
1977	Green Eyes	Lloyd Dubeck	Television film
1978	King	Martin Luther King Jr.	Miniseries
1979	Backstairs at the White House	Emmett Rogers Sr.	Miniseries
1979	Roots: The Next Generations	Dr. Horace Huguley	Episode #1.5
1980	Angel City	Cy	Television film
1981	The Sophisticated Gents	Richard "Bubbles" Wiggins	Television film
1982	Dreams Don't Die	Officer Charles "Charlie" Banks	Television film
1982	The Blue and the Gray	Jonathan Henry	Miniseries
1983	For Us the Living: The Medgar Evers Story	Sampson	Television film
1984	The Fall Guy	Bert Perkins	Episode: "Old Heroes Never Die"
1985	Go Tell It on the Mountain	Gabriel Grimes	Television film
1985	Murder, She Wrote	Det. Lieutenant Starkey	Episode: "Tough Guys Don't Die"
1986	Under Siege	Andrew Simon	Television film
1987	Mighty Pawns	Mr. Wright	Television film
1987–1988	The Charmings	The Magic Mirror	Main role
1988	227	Deacon Malcolm Fisk	Episode: "The Sing-Off"
1989–1990	227	Julian c. Barlow	Main role (season 5)
1989	The Women of Brewster Place	Sam Michael	Miniseries
1989	Wiseguy	Isaac Twine	6 episodes
1990	L.A. Law	Derron Holloway	4 episodes
1991	Family Matters	Jimmy Baines	Episode: "Finding the Words"
1991	Star Trek: The Next Generation	Captain Dathon	Episode: "Darmok"
1991	The Wish That Changed Christmas	Mr. Smith	Voice, Television film
1993	Batman: The Animated Series	Earl Cooper	Voice, episode: "The Mechanic"
1993	Irresistible Force	Commander Toole	Television film
1994	Scarlett	Big Sam	Miniseries
1994	Picket Fences	Judge Harold Nance	2 episodes
1994	Baseball	W. E. B. Du Bois / Satchel Paige	Voice, 2 episodes
1995	Babylon 5	General Richard Franklin	Episode: "GROPOS"
1995	Tyson	Don King	Television film
1995	Happily Ever After: Fairy Tales for Every Child	Father	Voice, episode: "Beauty and the Beast"
1995	White Dwarf	Dr. Akada	Television film
1995–1996	Gargoyles	Jeffrey Robbins	Voice, 3 episodes
1995–2003	Touched by an Angel	Sam	12 episodes
1996	Second Noah	Ramses	Episode: "Ghost Story"
1996–1997	The Magic School Bus	Mr. Ruhle	Voice, 4 episodes
1996–1998	The Simpsons	Lucius Sweet	Voice, 2 episodes
1997	Spider-Man: The Animated Series	Omar Mosely / Black Marvel	Voice, 3 episodes
1998	Walker, Texas Ranger	Pastor Roscoe Jones	Episode: "The Soul of Winter"
1999–2000	Batman Beyond	Sam Young	Voice, 3 episodes
1999–2004	City Confidential	Narrator	94 episodes
1999	Strange Justice	Thurgood Marshall	Television film
2002	Crossing Jordan	Dr. Phillip Sanders	Episode: "Four Fathers"
2003	Sounder	The Teacher	Television film

== Awards and nominations ==
Year	Awards	Category	Nominated work	Result	Ref.
1973	Academy Awards	Best Actor in a Leading Role	Sounder	Nominated	
1978	Primetime Emmy Awards	Outstanding Lead Actor in a Limited Series or a Special	King	Nominated	
1979	Primetime Emmy Awards	Outstanding Supporting Actor in a Limited Series or Special	Roots: The Next Generations (For "Episode V")	Nominated	
1982	NAACP Image Awards	Best Performance by an Actor in a Dramatic Series or Miniseries or Television Movie	The Sophisticated Gents	Won	
1995	Primetime Emmy Awards	Outstanding Guest Actor in a Drama Series	Picket Fences: Season 3	Won	
1997	Daytime Emmy Award	Outstanding Performer in a Children's Special	The Legend of Gator Face	Nominated	
1999	St. Louis International Film Festival	Lifetime Achievement Award	—	Won	
2004	Black Reel Awards	Outstanding Supporting Actor, TV Movie or Limited Series	Sounder	Nominated	
