= Osibisa =

Ghanaian-Nigerian-British band

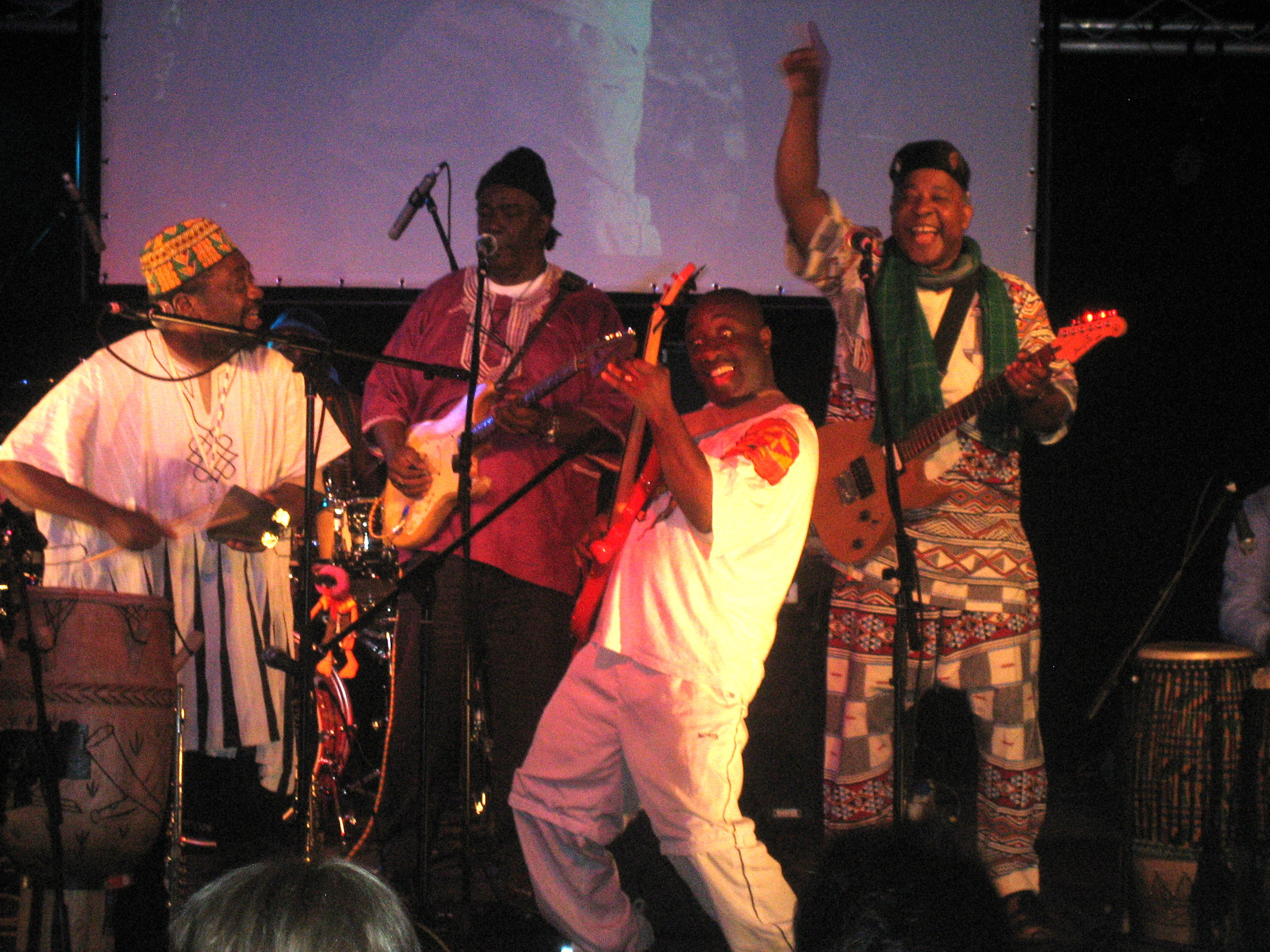
- Osibisa performing in 2008

Background information
- Also known as: O-S-I-B-I-S-A, Osi Bisa, Osibisi, Osibissa, オシビサ
- Origin: Accra, Ghana and London, England
- Genres: Afro rock; progressive rock; highlife
- Years active: 1969–present
- Labels: MCA Records, Bronze, Island, Decca (US), Warner Bros., Red Steel, Flying Elephant, BGO
- Website: Official website

Osibisa is a Ghanaian-Caribbean Afro rock band founded in London in the late 1960s by four expatriate West African and three London-based Caribbean musicians.

Osibisa was one of the most successful and longest lived of the African-heritage bands in London, alongside such contemporaries as Assagai, Dudu Pukwana, Chris McGregor's Brotherhood of Breath, Demon Fuzz, The Funkees, Cymande, Black Velvet, and Noir, and was largely responsible for the establishment of world music and Afro-rock as a marketable genre.

The original band that featured on the first three studio albums was universally known as the "Beautiful Seven", also a song on their album Woyaya.

== History ==
In Ghana in the 1950s, Teddy Osei (saxophone), Sol Amarfio (drums), Mamon Shareef, and Farhan Freere (flute) played in a highlife band called The Star Gazers. They left to form the Comets, with Osei's brother Mac Tontoh on trumpet, and scored a hit in West Africa with their 1958 song "(I Feel) Pata Pata". In 1962, Osei moved to London to study music on a scholarship from the Ghanaian government. In 1964 he formed Cat's Paw, an early "world music" band that combined highlife, rock, and soul. In 1969, Osei persuaded Amarfio and Tontoh to join him in London, and Osibisa was born. The name Osibisa was described in lyrics, album notes and interviews as meaning "criss-cross rhythms that explode with happiness" but it actually comes from "osibisaba" the Fante word for highlife.

Joining the three Ghanaians in the first incarnation were Antiguan Wendell (Dell) Richardson (lead guitar and lead vocalist), Nigerian Lasisi Amao (percussionist and tenor saxophone), Grenadian Roger Bedeau, also known as Spartacus R (bass), and Trinidadian Robert Bailey (keyboards). Nigerians Fred Coker and Mike Odumosu (bass guitar) were later replacements.

The band spent much of the 1970s touring the world, playing to large audiences in Japan, Australasia, India, and Africa. During this time Paul Golly (guitar) and Ghanaians Daku Adams "Potato" and Kiki Gyan were also members of the band. In 1971, Osibisa contributed African percussion to the title track of Uriah Heep’s progressive rock heavy rock album, Look at Yourself , an album which came to be viewed as a high point in Uriah Heep’s career, regarded by many fans and critics as one of Uriah Heep's finest albums. Billboard described the music as "a mirror… a driving, psychedelic flow that's sufficiently hypnotic, controlled and groovy to reflect the tastes of many youthful rockers." AllMusic's Donald A. Guarisco described the Uriah Heep track Osibisa contributed to as “a powerful rocker,” praising its “tribal-sounding drum jam,” deeming the composition to be “a high point of 1970s heavy metal”.

In January 1976, their single, "Sunshine Day", reached number 17 on the UK Singles Chart. Their next single release, "Dance the Body Music", peaked at number 31 in the same listing. In 1980, Osibisa performed at a special Zimbabwean independence celebration, and in 1983 were filmed onstage at the Marquee Club in London but by this time were a distant version of the original band.

Osibisa had an important series of gigs in India in 1981, culminating in the release of the Unleashed – Live in India album. The band engaged in a return to India, performing at the November Fest 2010 on 28 November 2010, at the Corporation Kalaiarangam in Coimbatore, Tamil Nadu.

Changes in the music industry meant declining sales for the band, and a series of label changes resulted. Some of the band returned to Ghana to set up a recording studio and theatre complex to help younger highlife musicians.

In the 1990s, their music was anthologised in many CD collections, with some of them allegedly unauthorised and paying no royalties to the band. However, this has been disputed by Osei, who, along with Amarfio and Tontoh, ran the band from the 1980s onwards.

In the early 1990s, Osei regrouped the band, and many of their past recordings released legally on CD. This included a remaster series with bonus material and hitherto unreleased material and live concerts on the Red Steel / Flying Elephant label collaboration.

Osei regrouped a version of the band in 1994 after commencing work with two UK labels: Castle Communications (who had the licensing rights to the Buddah catalogue and some of the Bronze Records catalogue) and Red Steel Music, who specialised in remastering and reissuing albums on CD. With a new producer and label behind him, Osei progressed to record new material, culminating in the 1995 release of Monsore, the band's first album of new material since the late 1980s Movements album.

The revitalised band with Osei at the helm commenced touring and recording, until Osei's stroke some fifteen years later. Osei cut back his touring schedule due to the effects of his illness but still continued to record until 2018.

Various new recording and release projects were carried out from the mid-1990s onwards with remastered, remixed and re-recorded projects seeing the light of day. This included previously unreleased material from the African Flight period, the incomplete follow-up which had a working title of African Dawn, live projects including Live at Cropredy (the bands first live album in fifteen years) followed by the semi acoustic live offering recorded at London's famous Jazz Cafe, Aka Ka Kra.

Work commenced on more studio material that remains unissued to this day. A new studio album, Osee Yee, was released in 2009.

After the removal of personnel by Osei in 2014/15, a new recording project with Osei at the helm commenced in late 2015, shortly after the successful placement of material that was chosen for Richard Linklater's film Boyhood. However, apart from one track included on the band's 2020 Sunshine Day: The Boyhood Sessions album, the recordings featuring Osei remain unreleased. Recent announcements from the Osei’s management and the band indicate these tracks will make an appearance in 2025 along with an album of previously unreleased material from earlier years that Osei had started work on in 2016.

Ace Ghanaian hip-hop music producer Hammer of The Last Two stated that his debut production, Obrafour's Pae Mu Ka album, which is the highest selling hiplife album to date, was inspired by Osibisa's song "Welcome Home." He also had the chance to work with Kiki Gyan a few days before his death.

On 13 December 2022, drummer and founding member Sol Amarfio died at the age of 84.

In June 2023, long-time Osibisa bass player, sometimes keyboard player and producer Victor Mensah died at the age of 66, after a protracted illness.

Founding member Teddy Osei, singer, saxophonist and drummer, died on 14 January 2025 in London. He was 87.

== Artistry ==
=== Music ===
Osibisa has been credited with introducing African music to European and North American audiences with their fusion of African and Western music styles. The band's style encompasses elements of rock, progressive rock, acid rock, Latin, jazz, afro-funk, jazz fusion, soul, highlife, reggae, calypso and pop. This style has been classified as afro rock, progressive rock, Afro-pop, and highlife. Mystic Energy saw the band shifting away from their trademark sound, in favor of R&B, dance-pop and disco.

=== Album covers ===
Their first two albums featured artwork by the progressive rock artist Roger Dean (before he became widely known for his artwork), depicting the flying elephants which became the symbol for the band. The third album, Heads, features a cover by Mati Klarwein, known for his covers of Santana’s Abraxas and Miles Davis' Bitches Brew. Osibirock, the band's sixth studio release featured "Negro Attacked by a Jaguar" (1910) by Henri Rousseau. Playing on the original flying elephants theme, the Ultimate Collection set features elephants with tank turrets for heads, an early Roger Dean idea reborn for the project. In 2009, their Osee Yee album featured the flying elephants once more, this time painted by Freyja Dean (Dean's daughter). Roger Dean's logo for the band continues to be used on many of the releases comprising classic material. Artwork for many of the reissues and 1990s material onwards was put together by Frank McPartland, Andrew Buckle and the Grammy Award winning designer Rachel Gutek and her Guppy Art company.

== Musicians - original band ==
- Teddy Osei (born Francis Osei, 1937–2025) – lead vocals, saxophone, flutes, percussion
- Mac Tontoh (born Kweku Adabanka Tonto, 1940–2010) – trumpet, horns, percussion
- Sol Amarfio (1938–2022) – drums, percussion
- Robert Bailey - keyboards, percussion
- Wendell (Dell) Richardson – guitars, lead vocals, percussion
- Abdul Loughty Lasisi Amao (1936–1988) – flute, vocals, percussion
- Spartacus R. (1948–2010) - bass, percussion, vocals

== Discography ==
=== Studio albums ===
- 1971 – Osibisa – (Billboard Hot 200 No. 55 – UK No. 11 – Can No. 47, AUS No. 13)
- 1971 – Woyaya – (Billboard No. 66 – UK No. 11 – Can No. 61, AUS No. 15) - Although conventionally spelled Woyaya, the title is actually Wɔyaya (with an open-o), which comes from the Ghanaian Ga language.
- 1972 – Heads – (Billboard No. 125 – Can No. 86, AUS No. 19)
- 1973 – Superfly T.N.T. Soundtrack (Billboard No. 159)
- 1973 – Happy Children (Billboard No. 202, AUS No. 46)
- 1974 – Osibirock (Billboard No. 175, AUS No. 67)
- 1975 – Welcome Home (Billboard No. 200, AUS No. 75) (aka Uhuru)
- 1976 – Ojah Awake (aka The Warrior)
- 1979 – Mystic Energy
- 1980 – Celebration
- 1981 – African Flight
- 1983 – African Dawn (unreleased)
- 1989 – Movements
- 1995 – Monsore
- 1998 – Urban Village (unreleased)
- 2003 – African Dawn, African Flight
- 2009 – Osee Yee
- 2021 – New Dawn
- TBA – Osibioddities

=== Live albums ===
- 1977 – Black Magic Night (Live at the Royal Festival Hall)
- 1982 – Unleashed - Live in India 1981
- 1984 – Live at The Marquee
- 1998 – Live at Cropredy
- 2001 – Aka Ka Kra - Acoustic
- 2005 – Blue Black Night

=== Compilations ===
- 1972 – Spirits Up Above
- 1973 – Best of Osibisa (AUS No. 88)
- 1981 – Osibisa Likes (India only)
- 1990 – African Criss Cross
- 1992 – Africa We Go Go
- 1992 – Ayiko Bia
- 1992 – Jambo
- 1992 – Gold
- 1992 – Celebration: The Best of Osibisa
- 1992 – Criss Cross Rhythms
- 1994 – The Very Best of Osibisa
- 1997 – Hot Flashback Volume 1
- 1997 – Sunshine Day: The Very Best of Osibisa
- 1997 – The Ultimate Collection (2 CDs)
- 1999 – The Best of Osibisa
- 2001 – Best of Vol.1
- 2001 – The Very Best of Osibisa (3 CDs)
- 2002 – Millennium Collection
- 2002 – Best of Osibisa
- 2004 – Wango Wango
- 2008 – Selected Works
- 2008 – Sunshine Day: The Hits
- 2009 – The Very Best of Osibisa
- 2015 – Singles As, Bs & 12 Inches Box Set (4 CDs)
- 2020 – Sunshine Day: The Boyhood Sessions (50th Anniversary Edition)

=== Singles ===
- 1971 – "Music for Gong Gong"
- 1972 – "Wango Wango"
- 1972 – "Ana Bo 1"
- 1972 – "Magnifico 7” EP
- 1972 - “Survival”
- 1973 – "Prophets"
- 1973 – "Happy Children"
- 1974 – "Adwoa"
- 1974 – "Who's Got The Paper"
- 1975 – "Sunshine Day" (UK No. 17)
- 1976 – "Black Ant"
- 1975 – "The Warrior"
- 1976 – "Dance the Body Music" (UK No. 31)
- 1976 – "The Coffee Song"
- 1977 – "The Warrior"
- 1977 – "Black Out"
- 1978 – "Living Loving Feeling"
- 1980 – "Jumbo"
- 1980 – "Celebration"
- 1980 – "Oreba"
- 1980 – "I Feel Pata Pata"
- 1982 – "Move Your Body"
- 1985 – "Wooly Bully"
- 1987 - “Getting Hot” EP
- 1995 – "Sunshine Day (radio edit)"
- 1996 – "Sunshine Day (Hot Summer Mix)” EP
- 1997 – "Dance The Body Music” video single (unreleased)
- 1998 – "Sunshine Day (Dancemaster Techno Mix)” (white label vinyl only)
- 1998 – "Dance The Body Music (The Edge Mix)" (white label vinyl only)
- 1998 – "Sunshine Day/Dance The Body Music (The Edge & Dancemaster EP)" Vinyl only
- 1999 – "Survival"
- 2019 – "Hold On"
- 2020 – "Feel Good(Boyhood Mix)"
- 2020 – "Nkosi Sikele Afrika / Woyaya"
- 2021 – "Douala”
- 2021 – "Adjuwa Aye (Go With the Flow)”
- 2022 - “Sunshine Day (Boyhood Summer mix)”
- 2022 – "Yo Luv Is Betta (Louie Vega Remix)”

== Videography ==
- 1983 – Warrior (VHS) (recorded 5 April 1983 at the Marquee Club, London)
- 2003 – Osibisa – Live (DVD Plus) (same show as above)
- 2012 – Live from the Marquee Club (same show as above)
- 2022 - Sunshine Day (Boyhood) (official video)

== Literature ==
- Lloyd Bradley, Sounds Like London: 100 Years of Black Music in the Capital, 2013. (Contributors)
- Charles Aniagolu: Osibisa – Living In The State Of Happy Vibes And Criss Cross Rhythms. Victoria (CDN): Trafford Publishing, 2004, ISBN 1-4120-2106-5.
- Brigitte Tast, Hans-Jürgen Tast be bop – Die Wilhelmshöhe rockt. Disco und Konzerte in der Hölle, Verlag Gebrüder Gerstenberg GmbH & Co. KG, Hildesheim, ISBN 978-3-8067-8589-0.
