= Ron O'Neal =

American actor (1937–2004)

- Ron O'Neal as Youngblood Priest in Super Fly (1972)
- Born: September 1, 1937; Utica, New York, U.S.
- Died: January 14, 2004 (aged 66); Los Angeles, California, U.S.
- Education: Ohio State University
- Occupations: Actor; director; writer
- Years active: 1969–2002
- Spouses: Carol T. Banks (m. 1973–1980) Audrey Pool (m. 1993–2004)

Ron O'Neal (September 1, 1937 – January 14, 2004) was an American actor, director and screenwriter, who rose to fame in his role as Youngblood Priest, a New York City cocaine dealer, in the blaxploitation film Super Fly (1972) and its sequel Super Fly T.N.T. (1973). O'Neal was also a director and writer for the sequel, and for the film Up Against the Wall.

== Early life ==
Ron O'Neal grew up in a working-class neighborhood of Cleveland, Ohio, to parents Eunice and Ernest O'Neal, a former jazz musician who earned his living as a factory worker. Ernest died when Ron was 16 years old. Six months later his brother, who worked as a truck driver, was killed in an accident. Following these tragedies his mother found a job in a hospital to sustain the family. Ron graduated from Glenville High School and attended Ohio State University, where he became interested in acting after seeing the play Finian's Rainbow. He joined the Karamu House company in Cleveland, Ohio, working with the oldest African-American theatre company in the United States from 1957 until 1964, during which period he appeared in plays such as Kiss Me, Kate, A Streetcar Named Desire and A Raisin in the Sun, while working as a housepainter to earn his living. In 1964, he went to New York, teaching acting classes at the Harlem Youth Arts Program and appearing in Off-Broadway plays.

== Career ==
In 1969, he appeared in the Broadway play Ceremonies in Dark Old Men.

That same year, he acted in Charles Gordone's Pulitzer Prize-winning play No Place to Be Somebody, he garnered even more attention, co-winning an Obie Award with Nathan George, along with several other prizes.

From there, he moved on to cinema with two minor roles in Move (1970) and The Organization (1971), after which he was contacted by a friend from Cleveland, screenwriter Phillip Fenty, who suggested he star in an all-black film about a drug dealer. Although shot on a meager budget, the film, Super Fly (1972), went on to become a major hit at the box office.

The success of that film led to a sequel, Super Fly T.N.T. (1973), which O'Neal himself directed, and in which he reprised his role as Youngblood Priest. Nevertheless, the movie was a box office failure. Afterward, he was frequently typecast as a pimp or drug dealer.

In 1975, he acted in on Broadway, replacing another actor, in All Over Town under the direction of Dustin Hoffman. He also appeared in Shakespeare plays during the 1970s, including Othello, Macbeth and The Taming of the Shrew.

During those years, film roles that went beyond stock characters were few and far between, notable exceptions being his roles in Brothers (1977), the television movie Brave New World (1980), and the miniseries The Sophisticated Gents (1981). He had a number of television guest appearances, frequently playing detective roles. He played a recurring role as police detective, Isadore Smalls, in the TV series The Equalizer, which ran for three seasons in the mid-1980s and starred British actor, Edward Woodward. He played the primary antagonist, the Cuban Colonel Ernesto Bella, in 1984's Red Dawn. In 1988, O'Neal had a recurring role as Mercer Gilbert on the popular NBC television sitcom A Different World, playing the wealthy father of the spoiled southern belle Whitley Gilbert (Jasmine Guy). His appearances lasted through 1992. In 1996, he appeared in the blaxploitation reunion film Original Gangstas.

== Personal life ==
O'Neal was first married to actress Carol Tillery Banks, from November 1973 until 1980 (divorced), and then to Audrey Pool, from 1993 until his death in 2004.

On November 17, 1984, O'Neal was stabbed at a restaurant in West Hollywood, California, following an argument.

== Death ==
O'Neal died in Los Angeles on January 14, 2004, after a four-year battle with pancreatic cancer, on the same day Super Fly was released on DVD in the United States.

The Wu-Tang Clan's 2014 album A Better Tomorrow includes a song titled "Ron O'Neal".

== Filmography ==
=== Film ===
- 1970: Move – Peter
- 1971: The Organization – Joe Peralez
- 1972: Super Fly – "Youngblood" Priest
- 1973: Super Fly T.N.T. – "Youngblood" Priest (also Writer/Director)
- 1975: The Master Gunfighter – Paulo
- 1977: Brothers – Walter Nance
- 1979: The Hitter – Otis
- 1979: A Force of One – Rollins
- 1979: When a Stranger Calls – Lieutenant Charlie Garber
- 1980: The Final Countdown – Commander Dan Thurman
- 1981: St. Helens – Otis Kaylor
- 1984: Red Dawn – Colonel Ernesto Bella
- 1988: Mercenary Fighters – Cliff Taylor
- 1988: Hero and the Terror – The Mayor
- 1988: Zombie Death House – Tom Boyle
- 1989: Hyper Space – Samuel "Tubbs" Tubarian
- 1989: Trained to Kill – George "Cotton" Shorter
- 1991: Up Against the Wall – George Wilkes (also Writer)
- 1994: Puppet Master 5: The Final Chapter – Detective
- 1996: Original Gangstas – Bubba
- 2001: The Rage Within – Captain Lang
- 2002: On the Edge – Frank Harris (final film role)

=== Television ===
Ron O'Neal television credits
Year	Title	Role	Notes	Ref.
1979	Freedom Road	Francis Cardoza	TV movie	
1980	Brave New World	Mustapha Mond	TV movie	
1980	Guyana Tragedy: The Story of Jim Jones	Colonel Robles	TV movie	
1981	The Sophisticated Gents	Clarence "Claire" Henderson	TV miniseries	
1982–1983	Bring 'Em Back Alive	H.H., His Royal Highness, The Sultan of Johore	17 episodes	
1985	Knight Rider	Charles Zurich	Episode: "Sky Knight" (S4.E4)	
1985-1986	Hill Street Blues	Stan Williams/Pete	3 episodes	
1986	The Equalizer	Lt. Isadore Smalls	7 episodes "Wash-Up" (S1.E16) "Torn" (S1.E17) "Unnatural Causes" (S1.E18) "Pretenders" (S1.E22) "Nocturne" (S2.E2) "Joyride" (S2.E4) "Nightscape" (S2.E6)	
1986	As Summers Die	Daniel Backus	TV movie	
1987	Frank's Place	Ozell Dryer	Episode: "Frank Joins the Club"	
1987	Beauty and the Beast	Isaac Stubbs	Episode: "Once Upon a Time in the City of New York"	
1988	Murder, She Wrote	Sgt. Joe Santiago	Episode: "J.B.. as in Jailbird"	
1988	Mathnet	Sgt. Bill Dietrich	2 episodes	
1988	Werewolf	Delaney	Episode: "To Dream of Wolves: Part 2"	
1989	1st & Ten	Mr. Byron	Episode: "Mind Games"	
1990-1992	A Different World	Mercer Gilbert	4 episodes	
1993	The Sinbad Show	Superfly	Episode: "David's Van"	
1997	Sparks	Arthur Fairchild	Episode: "Roots III"	
1997	Living Single	Clinton James	2 episodes	
1999	The Wayans Bros.	Sergeant Scully	Episode: "Saving Private Marlon"	
