= Crackdust =

Band

- Genres: Death metal
- Years active: 2006–present
- Members: Roth; S'Bond; Lee; Dlax

Crackdust is a death metal band from Botswana. Crackdust plays an aggressive style of death metal. Their themes are the undead, hatred and violence.

== History ==
Crackdust was founded at the beginning of 2006 by Roth (vocals, electric guitar), S'Bond (bass) and Dlax (drums). The band released the first single Deranged Psychopath the same year. Their debut album, Dented Reality, was published in December 2007. Mid-2008, Lee came as the new bassist for the band. The previous bassist S'Bond became the second guitarist of the band.

In early September 2008, Crackdust was the opening band of the Botswana Woodstock. In 2011, they released a second single Return of the Gods.

They are referenced by Lance in season two of Detectorists on BBC.

== Style ==
Crackdust is known for the slower tempos of their songs. Stylistically, the songs resemble a mixture of Bolt Thrower and Dan Swanö's slower works. The music of Crackdust has been compared to the works of Cannibal Corpse.

== Discography ==
Singles

- Deranged Psychopath (2006)
- Return of the Gods (2011)

Albums

- Dented Reality (2008, Core Riodic)
