= Blo (band) =

Nigerian psychedelic funk ensemble

- Origin: Lagos, Nigeria
- Genres: Psychedelic funk; afro-rock; psychedelic rock; disco
- Years active: 1972–1982
- Labels: EMI Nigeria, Afrodisia, Strut
- Past members: Laolu "Akins" Akintobi; Berkely "Ike" Jones; Mike "Gbenga" Odumosu

Blo was a Nigerian psychedelic funk ensemble formed in Lagos and active between 1972 and 1982. The main trio consisted of Laolu "Akins" Akintobi (drums), Berkely "Ike" Jones (guitar), and Mike "Gbenga" Odumosu (bass). The group fused the Afrobeat rhythms of Nigeria with funk and psychedelia derived from '60s Western rock music.

== History ==
The roots of Blo lay in the successful mid-60s highlife group the Clusters, who also performed as a backing band for the Sierra Leonean pop star Geraldo Pino. In 1970, the trio of Akintobi, Jones, and Odumosu left the group to form Afrocollection with sisters Kehinde and Taiwo Lijadu, exploring a more Afro-rock approach. They collaborated on the jazz-rock project Salt with British drummer Ginger Baker of Cream in 1971.

In late 1972, Akintobi, Jones, Odumosu formed Blo (standing for their names Berkeley, Laolu & Odumosu) and toured prior to recording their debut album Chapter One for the EMI Nigeria label. The album drew equally on the Afrobeat of Fela Kuti and Tony Allen as well as psychedelic rock from America. For their second album, the group signed to Afrodisia and moved further into funk and R&B territory. Commercial pressure forced the group to move toward more popular styles such as disco on their later recordings. They disbanded in 1982.

In 2009, the label Strut reissued many of their recordings on the retrospective Phases 1972–1982.

== Legacy ==
OkayAfrica stated that the group is "considered by many to be the first psych-rock band to emerge from the continent" and credited them with developing "a pioneering fusion in afro-psychedelic funk." FT called the group's debut "Nigeria's first psychedelic rock record," describing it as "a hypnotic brew of Hendrix-esque guitar noodling, Funkadelic-style rhythms and African-accented rock-outs." AllMusic credited the band with developing "a wholly original sound embracing the full spectrum of black music."

== Discography ==
- Chapter One (1973)
- Phase II (1974)
- Step Three (1975)
- Phase IV (1977)
- Bulky Backside (1979)
