= Clayrocksu =

Nigerian musician

- Also known as: Clay
- Born: Bianca Okorocha
- Genre: Alternative rock/Afro rock
- Years active: 2011-present

Bianca Okorocha, known professionally as Clayrocksu or Clay, is a Nigerian Alternative rock/Afro rock artist.

== Career ==
Clayrocksu fuses Igbo language and local pidgin folk elements with punk rock.

Her debut single "Ogadisinma" was nominated for a Nigeria Music Video Award in the Best Alternative category. Her single "Amin" won the Best Rock category at the 2022 All Africa Music Awards. She won the Top Naija Music Award for the Best Record of the Year for Dancing in the Sun, featuring Vector Tha Viper.

Clay has performed at Rocktoberfest and Ake Festival.

In May 2024, Clay released her second EP, Hate It Here. The work earned her a 2025 Grammy consideration.

According to Clay in an interview with The British Blacklist, "Hate It Here is a reflection on the harsh realities of growing up too fast and the crushing disappointment of discovering that adulthood is not the dream we earlier imagined. It’s an emotional journey through a world stamped by hatred, pain, conflict, deception, and heartbreak."

Clay is currently with the Afro Rockstars Collective, a community of rock music performers.

== Discography ==
Studio albums

- Road Less Travelled (2017)
- Hate It Here (2024)

Singles

- "Dancing in the Sun", featuring Vector Tha Viper. (2012)
- "The One", featuring Johnny Drille (2018)
- "Destiny (Remix)", featuring Kel (2020)

== Awards ==
Year	Award	Category	Work	Result
2011	Nigeria Music Video Awards	Best Alternative	Ogadisinma	Nominated
2012	Top Nigerian Music Award	Best Record of the Year	Dancing in the Sun	Won
2022	All Africa Music Awards	Best Rock category	Amin	Won
