= MonoMono =

Nigerian afro rock band

MonoMono were an afro-rock band formed in Lagos in 1971. The band, whose name means lightning in the Yoruba language, was composed of vocalist Joni Haastrup, bassist Babá Ken Okulolo, guitarist Danjuma "Jimi Lee" Adamu, Friday Jumbo and Candido Obajimi. They produced several singles and three full-length LPs. Their music was delivered in a jam format and is a blend of afropop, soul, and British rock.

== Career ==
Shortly after forming in 1971, Monomono released a 45 single with "A Dele" on side A and an instrumental "Kenimania" on side B.

In 1973, their debut record, Give The Beggar A Chance, was issued in Nigeria on vinyl by His Master's Voice label (owned by EMI). It was also released in Zambia and Peru that same year. It had the tagline The Lightning Power of Awareness on the cover. The cover was designed by Remi Olowookere, who would do the artwork for Fela Kuti’s album, Expensive Shit two years later. Side A had the songs "Give The Beggar A Chance", "Ema Kowa Lasa Ile Wa", and "The World Might Fall Over". Side B had the songs "Eje'A Mura Sise", "Find Out", "Lida Lou", "Kenimania".

That same year, their a self-titled album was issued on vinyl by EMI. Side A included "Ijo Ibile Wa", "Awareness" and "Unfinished Music". Side B included "Make Dem Realise", "Tire Loma Da Nighehin", and "Laipo Laipo Laiye Nyi". Monomono also released a single for EMI in 1973 called ""Gari Pass Water"".

In 1974, Monomono released their final vinyl album, The Dawn of Awareness, on Capitol/EMI in Nigeria. In the album they thanked Fela Kuti "for the little hint that did a good job". Side A included "Plain Fighting (Your Life Is What You Make Of It)", "Ipade Aladun (Yoruba)" and "Get Yourself Together". Side B included "Awareness Is Wot You Need", ‘Make Them (You) Realise (Everybody's Gotta Be Free)", and "Tire Loma Da Nighehin (Yoruba)". Monomono also released a single for EMI, "Wake Up The Dead Onez" that same year. Monomono's sound became popular among Nigeria's middle class youth. The band split apart in 1975 or 1976.

Soundway Records reissued the first two MonoMono records in 2011: 1972's Give the Beggar a Chance (EMI) and 1974's The Dawn of Awareness (Capitol).

Haastrup died on Tuesday 3 September 2024.
