= Sol Amarfio =

- Also known as: "The Rhythm Man"
- Born: Solomon Amarki Amarfio; 22 September 1938; Accra, Ghana
- Died: 13 December 2022 (aged 84)
- Occupations: drummer, songwriter

Solomon Amarki "Sol" Amarfio (22 September 1938 – 13 December 2022) was a Ghanaian drummer and songwriter. He was the drummer of Osibisa and also wrote songs for the band. With the band he scored a worldwide hit with The Coffee Song (1976), Sunshine Day (1976) and Pata Pata (1980).

== Biography ==
Amaerfio was born on 22 September 1938 in Asere in Accra. He started drumming at the age of 14, which he learned himself. and received as a teenager the nickname "The Rhythm Man". After playing in several bands in Ghana, in around 1960 he moved to London, where he played with other Ghanaian artists, including the brothers Teddy Osei (saxophone) and Mac Tontoh (trumpet). Together with other African and Caribbean musicians, he founded the group Osibisa in 1969. They played a mixture of Western and African music. Amarfio wrote several of the band's songs and they scored several hits, including in the Netherlands (Dutch Top 40) and the United Kingdom. Amarfio left the group in the early 1990s and moved back later to Accra where he was considered a musical hero. On 22 September 2018, several musicians performed at a concert specially organized to celebrate his 80th birthday.

Amarfio died on 13 December 2022, at the age of 84.
