= Afro rock =

Musical genre

Afro rock is a rock music genre that fuses Western rock instrumentation with traditional African musical elements, which emerged in the late 1960s and early 1970s.

== Influences ==
Afro rock draws heavily from traditional African music styles and genres, including Afrobeat, Highlife, Jùjú, and Soukous. It is also influenced by Western musical styles such as psychedelic rock, funk, and blues. Prominent Western artists and bands like The Beatles, Led Zeppelin, Santana, Jimi Hendrix, and La Fayette contributed to the development of Afro rock through their avant-garde approaches to rock music. In the late 1960s, bands including the Super Eagles and Psychedelic Aliens made important developments to the genre.

Fela Kuti, a Nigerian musician and activist, played an important role in the genesis of Afro rock through his influence on the development of Afrobeat, a genre incorporating elements from both traditional African music with jazz and funk.

The lyrical content of the genre commonly addresses themes of social justice, economic inequality, freedom and cultural identity, relevant to the political and social movements in post-colonial African societies during the mid-20th century. Lyrics are typically delivered in a combination of local African languages and Pidgin English or French.

== Characteristics ==
The instrumentation in Afro rock typically includes electric guitars, bass guitars, drum kits, keyboards, and synthesizers, alongside traditional African instruments such as the talking drum, mbira, balafon, and kora. The electric guitar often functions as the lead instrument. Guitarists commonly employ techniques such as riffing, improvisation, and the use of effects, particularly wah-wah and fuzz pedals, to modify tonal characteristics and create a distinctive sound profile.

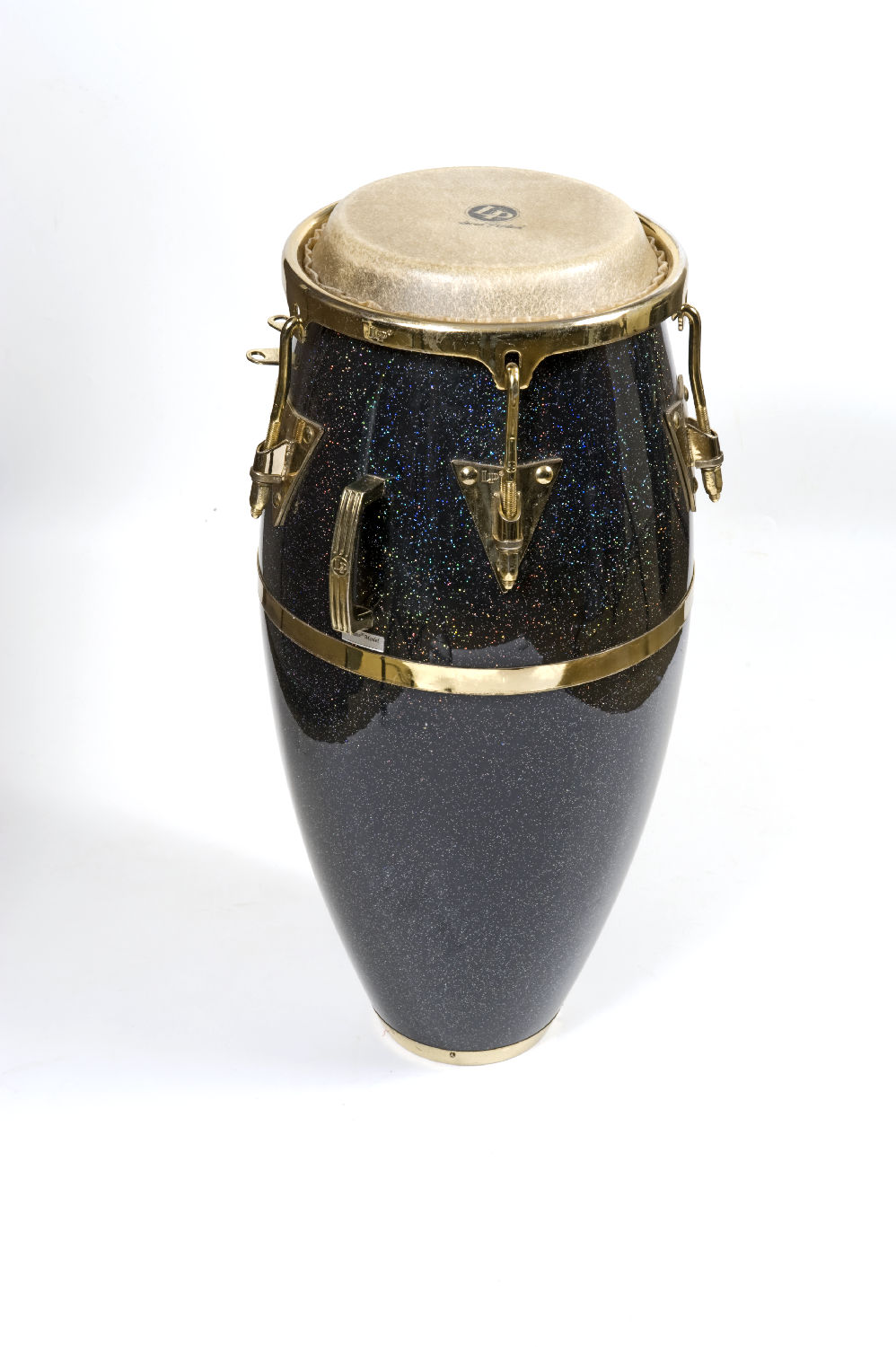
A conga drum

Percussion is also an essential component in Afro rock which combines standard Western drum kits with a variety of African and Afro-Caribbean percussion instruments, including congas, djembes, and shekeres. Rhythmically, the genre frequently uses complex devices including polyrhythms, syncopation, and irregular time signatures, taking from contemporary African genres such as Highlife, Soukous and Jùjú. Horn sections, often comprising saxophones, trumpets, and trombones, are also used in some Afro rock ensembles.

Performance in the genre is often defined by features such as extended instrumental passages and interactions between performing musicians. Live performances may include jam sessions and spontaneously rearranged compositions different from studio recordings. Vocal delivery ranges from melodic singing to call-and-response, inspired from both Western and African performance styles.

== Notable Afro rock musicians in Nigeria ==
Afro rock emerged in Nigeria during the late 1960s and early 1970s, during periods of political unrest in the duration and the aftermath of the Nigerian Civil War.

The Hykkers, formed in the early 1960s by Nigerian students, initially performed covers of British rock songs. By the late 1960s, they began integrating Nigerian rhythms and melodies with Western instrumentation, which contributed to the development of Afro rock. Their music gained prominence with the support of Fela Kuti, then a well-known figure in the Nigerian music scene. During the Nigerian Civil War, the band was reportedly captured by the Nigerian army, and their music was repurposed to boost morale and celebrate military victories. Notable tracks by The Hykkers include I Wanna Break Thru.

Formed in the early 1970s, Wrinkar Experience was a Nigerian Afro rock band that gained popularity with their single Fuel for Love, which became one of the highest-selling Nigerian singles of its time. The band, comprising members from Nigeria, Cameroon, and Ghana, was known for their lively performances and mix of Afrobeat rhythms with rock elements. After extensive touring across West Africa, the group disbanded in 1977. Wrinklar Experience also produced the track Ballad of a Sad Young Woman.

Ofege was a band formed by high school students in the early 1970s. Drawing inspiration from guitarists such as Jimi Hendrix and Carlos Santana, Ofege used Afrobeat rhythms with elements of psychedelic rock, disco and funk. Their debut album, Try and Love (1973), received critical acclaim for its creative approach and musical maturity, despite the young age of its members. Subsequent albums like The Last of the Origins (1976), Higher Plane Breeze (1977) and How Do You Feel (1978) also influenced the development of Afro rock.

Taiwo and Kehinde Lijadu, known as the Lijadu Sisters, were twin sisters who gained recognition in the late 1960s and 1970s for their music in the style of Afrobeat, reggae, funk and psychedelic rock. Influenced by artists such as Miriam Makeba, Aretha Franklin, and their cousin Fela Kuti, the duo were known for their use of synthesizers and traditional rhythmic patterns in their music. Their albums, including Danger (1976), Horizon Unlimited (1979) and Mother Africa (1977), often carried political messages and addressed social issues of the time. The duo toured Nigeria, Western Europe, and the United States, collaborating with well-known musicians such as Ginger Baker.

Formed in 1970 by guitarist and organist Bob Miga, The Strangers were an Afro rock band that emerged in the period following the Nigerian Civil War. They released three singles and a full album before disbanding. Their music featured funk-rock tunes using fuzz guitar and organ riffs. Osayomore Joseph was a Nigerian musician and political activist known for using both psychedelic rock with Highlife characteristics in his songs. His work often addressed themes relating to the socio-political climate of Nigeria in the 1970s.

Blo was a Nigerian psychedelic funk ensemble formed in Lagos in 1972. The band consisted of Laolu "Akins" Akintobi (drums), Berkely "Ike" Jones (guitar) and Mike "Gbenga" Odumosu (bass). Their debut album, Chapter One (1973), drew inspiration from Fela Kuti's Afrobeat and American psychedelic rock. The group later signed with Afrodisia and included more funk and R&B elements into their music. They disbanded in 1982.

MonoMono, meaning "lightning" in Yoruba, was a band formed in Lagos in 1971, led by vocalist Joni Haastrup, using features of Afropop, soul and British rock and delivered in a jam format. Their debut album, Give the Beggar a Chance (1972), was a critical and commercial success, praised for its use of both traditional Nigerian music with Western rock and soul influences.

== Notable Afro rock musicians in Zambia (Zamrock) ==
In Zambia, Afro rock developed into a distinctive subgenre known as Zamrock, or Zambian Rock, created in the late 1960s and early 1970s, which combined traditional Zambian melodies and Western rock music, including psychedelic rock, garage rock, blues, and funk. Zamrock's growth to international fame was precipitated by the introduction of a nationalist policy implemented by Zambia's first president, Kenneth Kaunda. In June 1975, Kaunda mandated that 95% of the music played on Zambian radio must be of local origin, which increased the production and promotion of the country's music industry.

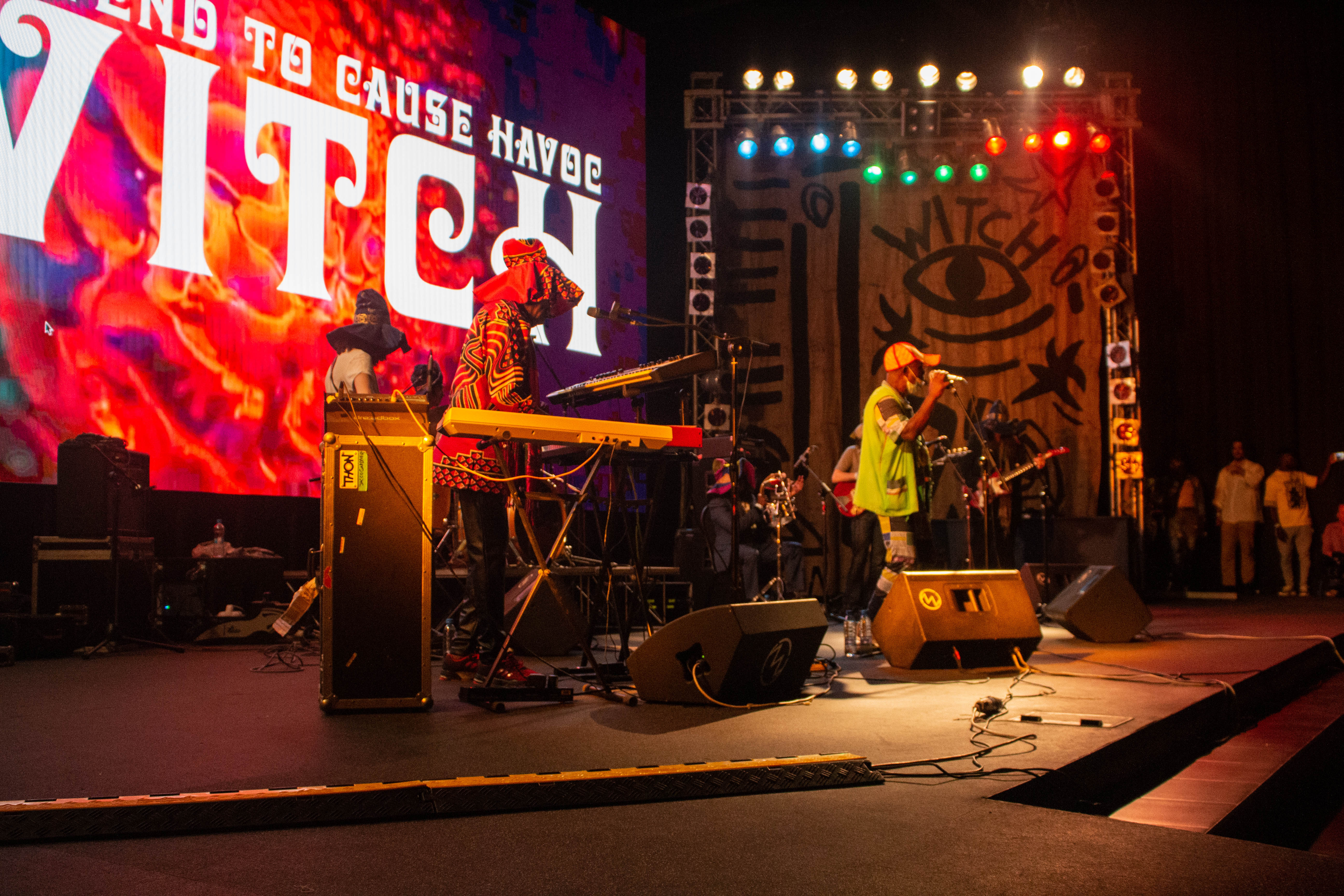
The Witch in 2021

Formed in the early 1970s in Kitwe, Witch (a backronym for "We Intend to Cause Havoc") became one of the most iconic Zamrock bands, known for their albums such as Introduction (1973) and In the Past (1974). After disbanding in the 1980s, the group saw a resurgence in popularity in the 2010s, with reissues of their music and new releases like Zango (2023) and Sogolo (2025).

Amanaz (an acronym of "Ask Me About Nice Artists in Zambia") was a five-piece band, led by Isaac Mpofu, from Kitwe that released their only album, Africa, in 1975. The album is well-known for its music inspired by heavy rock, folk-pop, and funk and distinctive for its blues-like grooves and thick layers of fuzz guitar. Despite its initial limited commercial success, Africa has since gained recognition as a classic of the Zamrock genre.

Led by Paul Ngozi, The Ngozi Family was known for their energetic performances and their culturally significant tracks such as Hi Babe and Day of Judgement (1976).

== Notable Afro rock musicians in Ghana ==
Afro rock in Ghana was created during the 1960s and 1970s, as a fusion genre of Highlife music and elements of funk, rock, and Afrobeat.

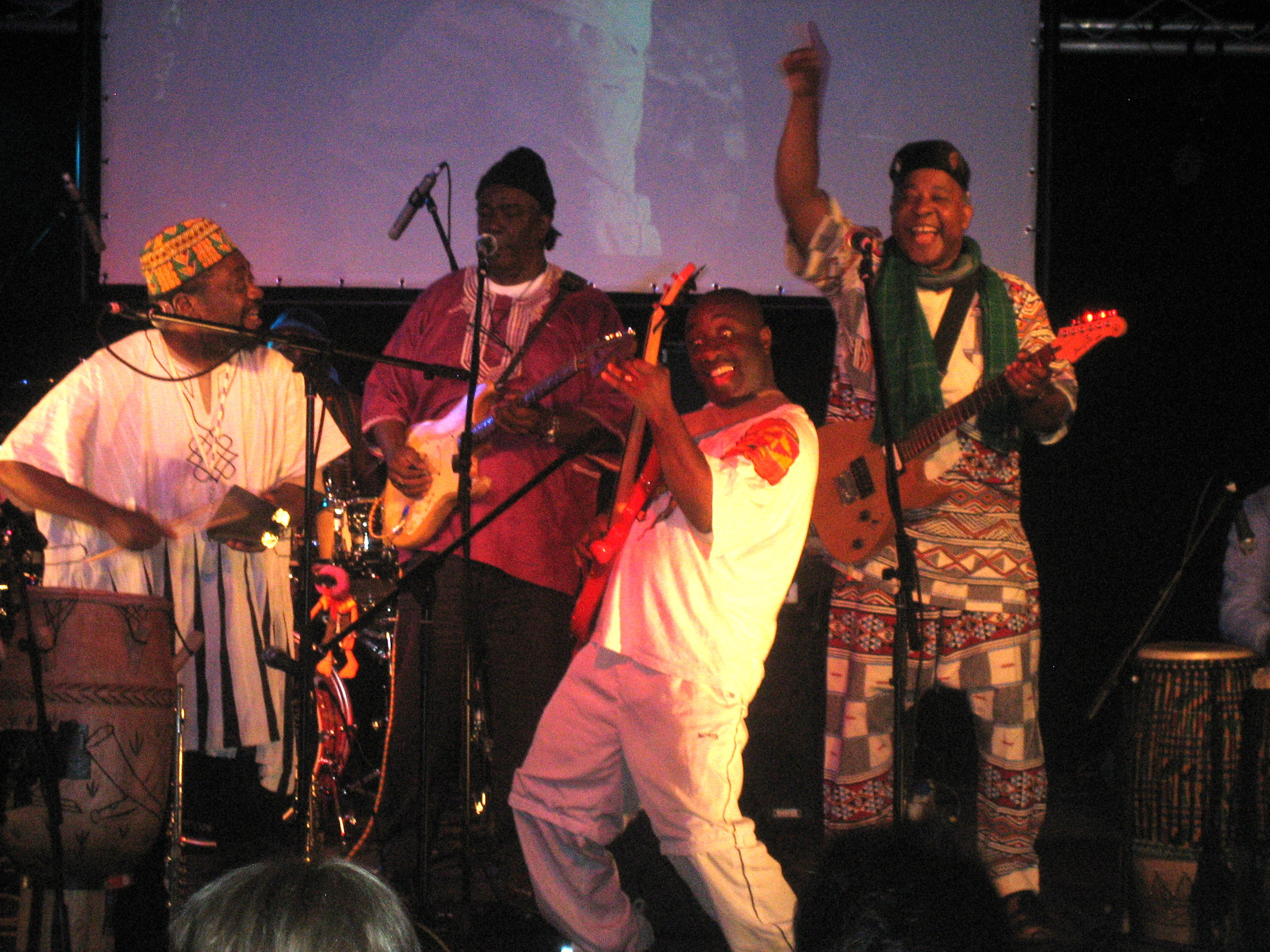
Osibisa in 2008

Osibisa, formed in London in 1969 by Ghanaian musicians Teddy Osei, Sol Amarfio, and Mac Tontoh, alongside other Caribbean and Nigerian members, is one of the most well-known Afro rock bands. The band's self-titled debut album, released in 1971, includes tracks such as Music for Gong Gong and Sunshine Day.

Ebo Taylor, a Ghanaian guitarist, composer, and bandleader active since the late 1950s, is an important figure in Ghanaian music during the 1960s and 1970s. He collaborated with several bands and worked as a producer and arranger for Essiebons Records.

The Psychedelic Aliens, also known as The Magic Aliens, were an experimental Ghanaian Afro rock group. Led by guitarist and vocalist Ade "Witch" Rocha, the band was known for hits such as We're Laughing and Extraordinary Woman.

== Contemporary Afro rock ==
In recent years, Afro Rock has seen a decline in popularity. However, the genre is still adopted by various artists, including laureates of the "Best Artist, Duo or Group" prize in the African Rock Category of the annual All Africa Music Awards (AFRIMA) such as the Zimbabwean Dear Zim (2014), the Angolan M'vula (2015, 2016), the Kenyan Gilad (2017), the Egyptian Maryam Saleh (2018), the Kenyan Rash (2021) and the Nigerian Clayrocksu (2022). The 2022 laureate, Clayrocksu, has gained international acclaim with features in the New York Times, BBC News and Reuters for her innovative Afro Rock music, which references Pidgin folk and Igbo cultural elements and uses a punk rock style. The Canadian magazine Toronto Star defines her as "magnetic" for "her ability to fuse rock music with Afropop, the predominant contemporary sound in Lagos, Nigeria".

Another prominent contemporary West African rock band is Dark Suburb from Ghana, which takes inspiration from Alkebulanian masquerade culture and skeletal imagery. Another distinguished African rock band is Tinariwen, a collective of Tuareg musicians from the Sahara region of northern Mali, known for their desert blues music, which combines traditional Tuareg and African music with Western rock. They have released nine albums since their formation and have toured internationally. The group has been nominated for the Grammy Awards three times, and their 2012 album Tassili won the award for Best World Music Album in 2012. The group has been described by American media organization NPR as "music's true rebels" and "rock 'n' roll rebels whose rebellion, for once, wasn't just metaphorical" by American online magazine Slate, and their music has been claimed by AllMusic "a grassroots voice of rebellion".

== List of Afro rock musicians ==
- Miriam Makeba
- Osibisa
- Teddy Osei
- Sol Amarfio
- Assagai
- Tinariwen
- Demon Fuzz
- Ofege
- Lijadu Sisters
- Arka'n Asrafokor
- Skinflint
- Crackdust
- Blo
- MATATA
- Ofo & The Black Company
- Clayrocksu
- MonoMono
- Remi Kabaka, drummer
- Nova Twins
- Witch
- Amanaz
- Paul Ngozi
- Ebo Taylor
- Manu Dibango
- Fela Kuti
- Alhaji K. Frimpong

== See also ==
- Afrobeat
- Highlife
