= Teddy Osei =

Ghanaian saxophonist and musician (1935–2025)

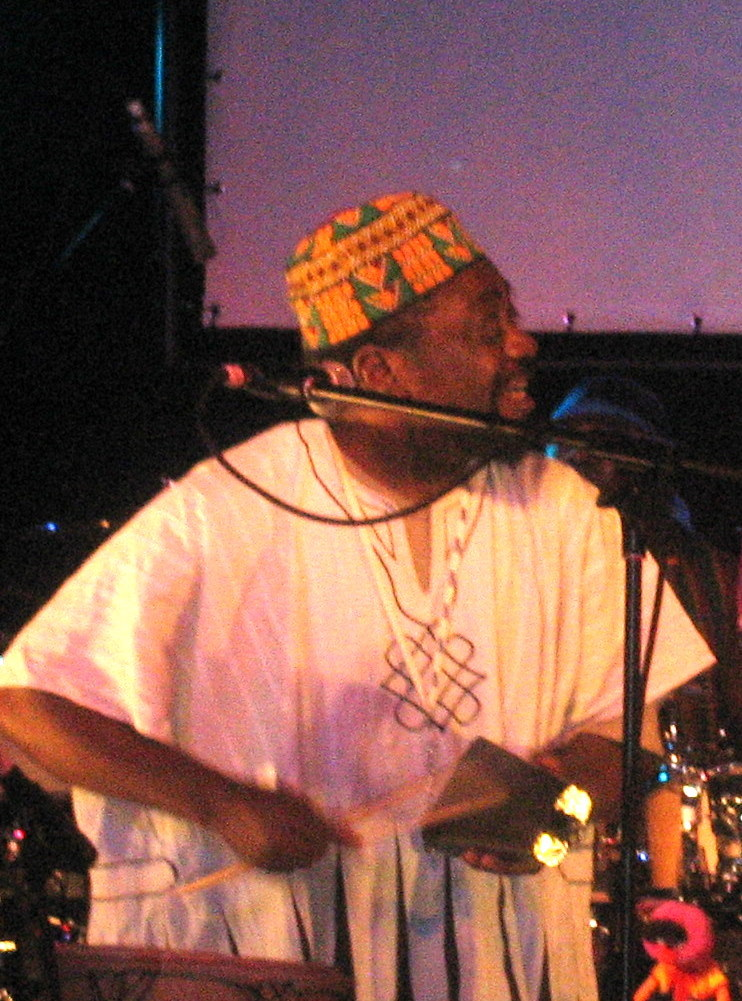
- Osei performing with Osibisa in 2008

Background information
- Born: Francis Osei; 17 December 1935; Kumasi, Ashanti, Gold Coast (now Ghana)
- Died: 14 January 2025 (aged 89) London, England
- Genre: Afro-pop
- Occupation: Musician
- Instruments: Saxophone, flute, drums, vocals
- Years active: 1969–2025
- Formerly of: Osibisa
- Website: osibisa.co.uk

Francis Osei (17 December 1935 – 14 January 2025), known as Teddy Osei, was a Ghanaian musician who was a saxophone player, drummer and vocalist, and best known as the leader of the Afro-pop band Osibisa, founded in 1969. Born in Kumasi, Osei was introduced to musical instruments while still a child. He began to play the saxophone while attempting to create a band with his college friends in the coastal city of Sekondi. After graduating from college, he worked as a building inspector for a year before creating a band called "The Comets." The Comets enjoyed brief popularity before Osei travelled to London in 1962. He received a grant from the Ghanaian government to study at a private music and drama school for three years, before being forced to leave by a regime change in Ghana. In 1969, he founded Osibisa along with several other musicians. The band remained popular through the 1970s, before experiencing a decline, although it continues to perform today.

== Background ==
Osei was born in Kumasi, the capital of the Ashanti region of the Gold Coast (now Ghana). At birth, he was christened "Francis" by his parents, who were Roman Catholics. He was the second of seven children in the family. His date of birth is unknown due to the absence of record keeping in Ghana at the time; his mother later estimated that he was born in December 1935. In keeping with his family's tradition, each child was given a different last name. Teddy Osei was named after the Ashanti king Asantehene Osei Tutu. Osei's father was an amateur musician who played the horn in the local church band, thus exposing Osei to music while he was still young. He was introduced to traditional musical instruments by his school teacher, and played the bass drum in the school band. He also frequented the Ashanti palace, where he occasionally learned folk songs from visiting musicians. After completing pre-school, Osei was enrolled at a Catholic mission school, where he experienced harsh discipline. He later stated that he had been more afraid of the teachers there than any others in his life. He became a popular athlete at the school, as well as an altar boy.

Following his graduation, Osei worked as an office boy for a year, before moving to Sekondi to study draftsmanship at a college. Sekondi was an important commercial and cultural hub, and he encountered a number of modern musicians and genres there. During this time he was influenced by Kwame Nkrumah, and supported his political party and its campaign against British colonialism. After completing his degree, Osei returned to Kumasi and worked as a building inspector for a brief while, before choosing to become a professional musician. Teddy has three daughters Agnes, Matilda and Shanta Osei.

Teddy Osei died on 14 January 2025, at the age of 89.

== Early musical career ==
While at college, he attempted to put together a band along with some of his friends. According to Osei, he only began to play the saxophone because the person who had volunteered for that instrument did not attend the practices. He continued to teach himself the saxophone, listening to records of jazz musicians and playing along with the music. After beginning work as an inspector, he created a semi-professional band along with his brother and some friends. The band was known as the "Comets," and became successful in Ghana, recording with Philips West Africa and playing for a radio show. Their music was inspired by "Highlife," a genre derived from a fusion of European and African influences.

In 1962, Osei travelled to London, leaving the Comets behind. Having spent his money on travel, he lived with some friends in London, and worked as a dish-washer for a year. He then applied for and received a grant from the Ghanaian government, which allowed him to attend a private music and drama school for three years. However, his grant was terminated after Kwame Nkrumah was overthrown in the 1966 Ghanaian coup d'état. Osei teamed up with several other students who had also lost their positions and began to play soul music at various venues across Europe. The group acquired a following in Switzerland, and named themselves "Cat's Paw". At this stage its members included Sol Amarfio and Osei's brother Mac Tontoh, both future members of Osibisa. However, the group eventually returned to the UK, looking for a more permanent financial situation.

== Osibisa ==
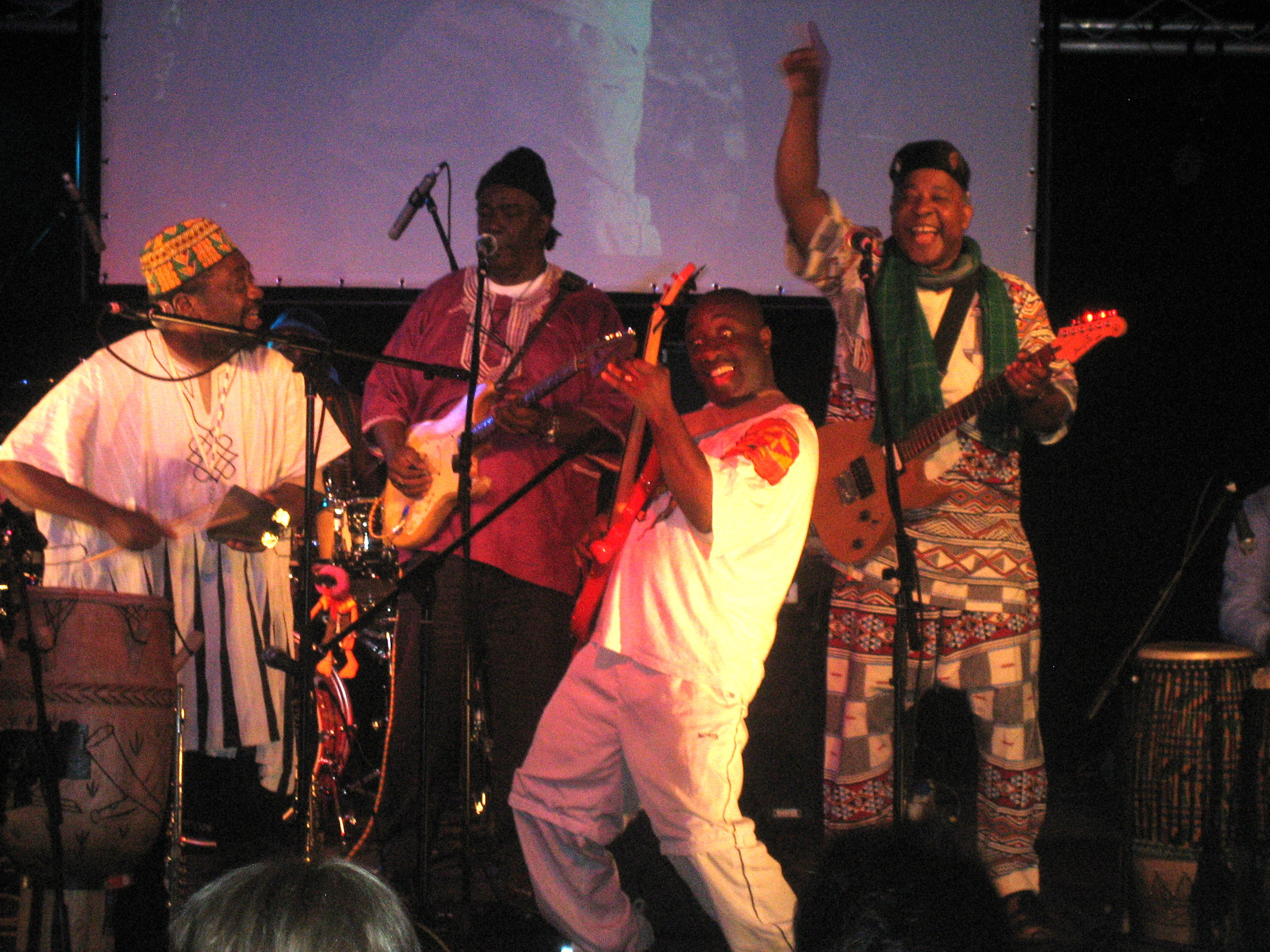
Osibisa at a concert

In 1969, Osei, Amarfio, and Mac Tontoh came together with other London based musicians that they had been previously acquainted with to form Osibisa.

The new band derived its name from osibisaaba, the name given to the style of music that was a fusion of "palm-wine" music and traditional Fante fisherman's traditional music. In its early stages Osibisa had neither an agent nor a manager. The band played at psychedelic venues around London while it tried to find financial and managerial support, eventually being picked up by Gerry Bron and Lillian Bron of Bronze Records Bronze Music Management. During this period Osei played flute and African drums as well as saxophone.The Bron’s managed to secure a deal with MCA Records with help from an encouraging Stevie Wonder who was an early fan of the band.

Signing with MCA for a multi album worldwide deal that included a young Tony Visconti in the producers chair for the first two albums, the band became an instant success, later producing several songs that reached the British top-ten. They were even more popular when playing live. During the late 1970s they played on several international tours to India, Japan, Australia, New Zealand and several African countries.

In 1971, Osei, with Osibisa contributed African percussion to the title track of Uriah Heep’s progressive rock heavy rock album, Look at Yourself, an album which came to be viewed as a high point in Uriah Heep’s career, regarded by many fans and critics as one of Uriah Heep's finest albums. Billboard described the music as "a mirror… a driving, psychedelic flow that's sufficiently hypnotic, controlled and groovy to reflect the tastes of many youthful rockers."AllMusic's Donald A. Guarisco described the Uriah Heep track he contributed to as “a powerful rocker,” praising its “tribal-sounding drum jam,” deeming the composition to be “a high point of 1970s heavy metal”.

In 1980, the band played at a concert celebrating the independence of Zimbabwe. However, by the mid 1980s, it had begun to lose some popularity but remained popular in India and other territories. Member change was common within the band, although Osei always continued to perform. Despite their decline in popularity, Osibisa continue to perform and record today.
