= RSO Records discography =

The following is a list of albums released by the now defunct record label RSO Records.

== 1970s ==
=== 1973 ===
- Bee Gees - Life in a Tin Can
- Blue - Blue
- Eric Clapton - Eric Clapton's Rainbow Concert

=== 1974 ===
- Bee Gees - Mr. Natural
- Jack Bruce - Out of the Storm
- Eric Clapton - 461 Ocean Boulevard
- Freddie King - Burglar
- Love - Reel to Reel
- John, Paul, George, Ringo... and Bert - Cast album featuring Barbara Dickson

=== 1975 ===
- Bee Gees - Main Course
- Eric Clapton - E. C. Was Here
- Eric Clapton - There's One in Every Crowd
- Yvonne Elliman - Rising Sun
- Freddie King - Larger Than Life
- Revelation - Revelation
- Various artists - Peter and the Wolf

=== 1976 ===
- Bee Gees - Bee Gees Gold
- Bee Gees - Children of the World
- Eric Clapton - No Reason to Cry
- The Impressions - Loving Power
- Freddie King - Freddie King (1934-1976)
- Lady Flash - Beauties in the Night
- Barbara Dickson - Answer Me

=== 1977 ===
- Bee Gees - Here at Last... Bee Gees... Live
- Gene Clark - Two Sides to Every Story
- Eric Clapton - Slowhand
- Rick Dees & His Cast of Idiots - The Original Disco Duck
- Barbara Dickson - Morning Comes Quickly
- Yvonne Elliman - Love Me
- Andy Gibb - Flowing Rivers
- Paul Nicholas - Paul Nicholas
- Player - Player
- John Stewart - Fire in the Wind
- Various artists - Saturday Night Fever

=== 1978 ===
- Bee Gees - 20 Greatest Hits
- Jim Capaldi - Daughter of the Night
- Eric Clapton - Backless
- Yvonne Elliman - Night Flight
- Andy Gibb - Shadow Dancing
- Player - Danger Zone
- Various artists - Grease: The Original Soundtrack from the Motion Picture
- Various artists - Sgt. Pepper's Lonely Hearts Club Band

=== 1979 ===
- AKB - Rhythmic Feet
- Bee Gees - Bee Gees Greatest
- Bee Gees - Spirits Having Flown
- Jim Capaldi - Electric Nights
- Linda Clifford - Here's My Love
- Linda Clifford - Let Me Be Your Woman
- East Coast - East Coast
- Yvonne Elliman - Yvonne
- Festival - Evita
- Gavin Christopher - Gavin Christopher
- The Headboys - The Headboys
- Highway - Highway 1
- Leroy Hutson - Unforgettable
- Alvin Lee - Ride On
- Curtis Mayfield - Heartbeat (Curtom)
- Mistress - Mistress
- Suzi Quatro - Suzi ... and Other Four Letter Words
- John Stewart - Bombs Away Dream Babies
- Various artists - The Original Soundtrack From The Motion Picture Meatballs
- Various artists - Moment by Moment: The Original Soundtrack from the Motion Picture

== 1980s ==
=== 1980 ===
- Ron Carter - Empire Jazz
- Linda Clifford - I'm Yours
- Linda Clifford and Curtis Mayfield - The Right Combination (Curtom)
- Eric Clapton - Just One Night
- Andy Gibb - After Dark
- Andy Gibb - Andy Gibb's Greatest Hits
- The Kingbees - The Kingbees
- Curtis Mayfield - Something to Believe In (Curtom)
- Meco - Christmas in the Stars: Star Wars Christmas Album
- Johnny Rivers - Borrowed Time
- The Rockets - No Ballads
- Jimmy Ruffin - Sunrise
- John Stewart - Dream Babies Go Hollywood
- Various artists - Star Wars: The Empire Strikes Back (Original Motion Picture Soundtrack)
- Various artists - Fame: The Original Soundtrack from the Motion Picture
- Various artists - Times Square: The Original Motion Picture Soundtrack

=== 1981 ===
- Bee Gees - Living Eyes
- Eric Clapton - Another Ticket
- The Kingbees - The Big Rock
- Shot in the Dark - Shot in the Dark

=== 1982 ===
- Eric Clapton - Timepieces: The Best of Eric Clapton
- Various artists - Grease 2: Original Soundtrack Recording

=== 1983 ===
- Various artists - Star Wars: Return of the Jedi (Original Motion Picture Soundtrack)
- Various artists - Staying Alive: The Original Motion Picture Soundtrack
