= Henry Gibson (percussionist) =

American drummer

"Master" Henry Gibson
- Born: August 9, 1942; United States
- Died: December 18, 2002 (aged 60) Stockholm, Sweden
- Genres: Jazz, Soul, Funk
- Occupation: Percussionist
- Instruments: Bongo drums, Conga drums
- Years active: 1960s–2002
- Formerly of: Phil Cohran's Artistic Heritage Ensemble, Odell Brown and the Organizers

"Master" Henry Gibson (August 9, 1942 – December 18, 2002) was an American percussionist with an extensive career and discography spanning four decades, best known for his work with Curtis Mayfield.

== Career ==
Growing up in Chicago, Gibson was constantly tapping out rhythms on his desk at school. At age ten he acquired a set of bongos, which he used to perform on the streets and in laundrettes in his neighborhood. In the late 1950s, Gibson began playing with and toured for more than a year with calypso singer Mighty Panther before returning to Chicago.

In the 1960s, Gibson performed with Rev. Jesse Jackson's Operation Push. He worked in Chicago recording studios as a session musician, recording with Stan Getz, Ramsey Lewis, Jackie Wilson, Oscar Peterson, The Impressions, and Aretha Franklin. Later, he became a member of Phil Cohran's Artistic Heritage Ensemble, and played and recorded with the jazz ensemble Odell Brown and the Organ-izers. In the late 1960s he recorded with Brunswick Records artists, including the Chi-Lites, Kenny Burrell, Oscar Brown Jr., and Gene Chandler. He played and toured with Donny Hathaway, including playing percussion on Hathaway's breakthrough single, "The Ghetto", and began playing and touring with Curtis Mayfield, a role that would define Gibson's career for a decade.

In the mid-1970s and 1980s, Gibson performed on the Hawaiian Islands and lived on the island of Oahu. He teamed with musician, songwriter, and producer Kirk Thompson to record the iconic Lemuria album and collaborated with many of the top local Waikiki musicians of that era, including vocalist Azure McCall and pianist Tennyson Stevens. Gibson was integral to Kirk Thompson's 'Super Session' with Michael 'Papabax' Baxter on keyboards, John Gallarde on bass, and Ron Felix on drums.

While performing at a Hard Rock Cafe in Stockholm, Sweden, he met and married his wife Anne. Gibson continued touring in the 1990s, playing with Gipsy Kings, Chaka Khan, and others.

His distinctive style can be heard among other recordings on Curtis Mayfield's "Pusherman." An unsung Soul artist, Gibson felt he had more than paid his dues. In his later years, he was less and less content with being a sideman and began asserting himself as the main attraction, placing his percussion at the forefront of shows. He was known for getting upset with audiences in noisy venues — after demanding their silence and full attention, he would instantly regain his focus and proceed to put on spellbinding performances on the bongos.

He died in Stockholm of a heart attack at age 60. His last concert appearance was with Khaled Habib and Zak Keith at the Lydmar Hotel in Stockholm. Months after his death in 2002, friends and musicians got together to organize a tribute concert at the Fasching Jazz Club in Stockholm.

== Film ==
Henry appeared on several blaxploitation movies such as Super Fly.

== Recordings ==
- Sonny Stitt with Bennie Green: My Main Man - 1964
- Odell Brown & the Organ-izers: Ducky - 1967 ("No More Water in the Well", "Tough Tip", "She's Coming My Way")
- Ahmad Jamal: Ahmad Jamal at the Top: Poinciana Revisited - 1969 ("Poinciana")
- Donny Hathaway: Everything Is Everything - 1970
- Curtis Mayfield: Curtis/Live! - 1971
- Kool & The Gang: Live at PJ's - 1971 ("Dujii")
- Rotary Connection: Hey, Love - 1971 ("If I Sing My Song", "Sea & She", "I Am the Black Gold of the Sun")
- Eddie Harris: Instant Death - 1971
- Roy Ayers: The Boogie Back - 1974
- Ahmad Jamal: Ahmad - 1975 ("Superstition")
- Leroy Hutson: Hutson - 1975
- Leroy Hutson: Hutson II - 1976 ("Love the Feeling", "Situations", "I Do, I Do", "All Because of You", "I Bless the Day", "It's Different", "Paradise")
- Natalie Cole: Natalie - 1976
- Ben Sidran: Free in America - 1976
- The Staple Singers: Pass It On - 1976 ("Real Thing Inside of Me/Party", "Take Your Own Time, Sweeter ...")
- Curtis Mayfield: Super Fly - 1972
- Curtis Mayfield: Short Eyes - 1977
- Curtis Mayfield: Never Say You Can't Survive - 1977
- Loleatta Holloway: Loleatta - 1977 ("Hit And Run", "Is It Just A Man's Way?", "We're Getting Stronger")
- Curtis Mayfield: Do It All Night - 1978
- Leroy Hutson: Closer to the Source - 1978 ("Where Did Love Go?", "Closer to the Source")
- Lemuria (Lemuria 1978)
- Aretha Franklin Almighty Fire - 1978 ("Almighty Fire (Woman of the Future)", "Lady, Lady", "More Than...")
- Walter Jackson: Good to See You - 1978
- Minnie Riperton: Minnie - 1979 ("Memory Lane", "Lover and Friend", "Return to Forever", "All Of It", "Lonely Girl", "Happy New Love")
- Paulette McWilliams: Never Been Here Before - 1979 ("Don't Let Love Go", "I'll Never Make You Cry", "Main Squeeze")
- Curtis Mayfield: Live in Europe - 1987 ("Introduction", "Ice 9 Instrumental", "Back to the World")
- Zak Keith: Sessions - 1989 ("Shaw 'Nuff")
- Nohelani Cypriano: Around Again - 1995 ("Livin' Without You", "Moon Of Monakoora", "South Sea Island Magic")
- Tyrone Davis: Best Of - 1996 ("Let's Be Closer Together", "In The Mood", "Heart Failure", "Close to You")
- Bob DeVos: Breaking the Ice - 1999 ("Breaking The Ice", "Walk On By", "You Don't Know What Love Is")
- Curtis Mayfield & Linda Clifford: Curtis Mayfield & Linda Clifford - 2000 ("Rock You to Your Socks", "Right Combination", "I'm So Proud")
- Gball da Godfather: ""G" Street Remix" - 2000
- Stanley B: All For Love - 2002 ("This Is 'B'", "Do You?", "All For Love")
- Charles Earland
- Phil Upchurch
- Kenny Burrell
- Earth Wind & Fire
- Red Rodney: "Shaw 'Nuff"
