= Bridge over Troubled Water (song) =

1970 song recorded by Simon & Garfunkel

- Front cover of the US and some overseas vinyl releases (back cover shows Garfunkel)

Single by Simon & Garfunkel

from the album Bridge over Troubled Water
- B-side: "Keep the Customer Satisfied"
- Released: January 20, 1970
- Recorded: August 1969; November 9, 1969
- Genre: Pop rock; soft rock; gospel
- Length: 4:55
- Label: Columbia
- Songwriter: Paul Simon
- Producers: Roy Halee; Paul Simon; Art Garfunkel

Simon & Garfunkel singles chronology
"The Boxer" (1969)	"Bridge over Troubled Water" (1970)	"Cecilia" (1970)

Official audio
- "Bridge over Troubled Water" on YouTube

Audio sample
- file; help

"Bridge over Troubled Water" is a song by the American folk rock duo Simon & Garfunkel, released in January 1970 as the second single from their fifth and final studio album, Bridge over Troubled Water (1970). It was written by Paul Simon and produced by Simon, Art Garfunkel and Roy Halee.

"Bridge over Troubled Water" features lead vocals by Art Garfunkel and a piano accompaniment influenced by gospel music, with a "Wall of Sound"-style production. It was the last song recorded for the album, but the first completed. The instrumentation, provided by the Wrecking Crew, was recorded in California, while Simon and Garfunkel's vocals were recorded in New York. Simon felt Garfunkel should sing solo, an invitation Garfunkel initially declined. Session musician Larry Knechtel performs piano, with Joe Osborn playing bass guitar and Hal Blaine on drums.

The song won five awards at the 13th Annual Grammy Awards in 1971, including Grammy Award for Record of the Year and Song of the Year. It is Simon & Garfunkel's most successful single, topping the US Billboard Hot 100 singles chart for six consecutive weeks, and was the No. 1 song on the Billboard Year-End Hot 100 singles of 1970. It also hit number one in the United Kingdom, Canada, France and New Zealand. It reached the top five in eight other countries, eventually selling over six million copies worldwide. It became one of the most performed songs of the 20th century, covered by over 50 artists, including Elvis Presley, Aretha Franklin and Johnny Cash. It is ranked number 66 on Rolling Stone's 500 Greatest Songs of All Time. American politician George McGovern used it as the theme song for his 1972 presidential campaign.

== Background ==
"Bridge over Troubled Water" was written by Paul Simon in early 1969; the song came to him very quickly, so much so that he asked himself: "Where did that come from? It doesn't seem like me." The title concept was inspired by Claude Jeter's line "I'll be your bridge over deep water if you trust in my name", which Jeter sang with his group, the Swan Silvertones, in the 1959 song "Mary Don't You Weep". According to gospel producer and historian Anthony Heilbut, Simon acknowledged his debt to Jeter in person, and handed Jeter a check. Simon named Johann Sebastian Bach's "O Sacred Head, Now Wounded" as inspiration for parts of the melody. Simon wrote the song initially on guitar but used the piano to reflect the gospel influence and suit Garfunkel's voice.

Simon told his partner, Art Garfunkel, that Garfunkel should sing it alone, the "white choirboy way", though Simon adds harmony on the final verse. Garfunkel felt it was not right for him; he liked Simon's falsetto on the demo and suggested that Simon sing. At the suggestion of Garfunkel and producer Roy Halee, Simon wrote an extra verse and a "bigger" ending, though he felt it was less cohesive with the earlier verses. The final verse was written about Simon's then-wife Peggy Harper, who had noticed her first gray hairs ("Sail on, silvergirl"). It does not refer to a drug abuser's hypodermic needle, as is sometimes claimed. The verse was Garfunkel's idea, but Simon reportedly did not like it.

"Bridge over Troubled Water" was the final track recorded for the album but the first completed, with an additional two weeks of post-production. Simon initially wrote the song in G major, but arranger and composer Jimmie Haskell transposed the song to E-flat major to suit Garfunkel's voice. The song's instrumental parts were recorded in August 1969 in California, to make it easier for Garfunkel to go to Mexico to film Catch-22. Simon wanted a gospel piano sound, and hired session musician Larry Knechtel. Joe Osborn played two separate bass tracks, one high and the other low. A string section entering in the third verse completed the arrangement. The drums were played by Hal Blaine in an echo chamber to achieve a hall effect and Los Angeles session percussionist Gary Coleman played the Vibraphone. Haskell misheard the demo's chorus, writing "Like a Pitcher of Water" on the title page of his sheet music: Simon later framed it.

Simon and Garfunkel returned to New York in November 1969 to record the vocals. The vocal style in "Bridge over Troubled Water" was inspired by Phil Spector's technique in "Old Man River" by The Righteous Brothers. Simon said it sounded like the Beatles' "Let It Be", stating in a Rolling Stone interview: "They are very similar songs, certainly in instrumentation."

As their relations frayed preceding their 1970 breakup, Simon began to experience regret for allowing Garfunkel to sing it solo:

He felt I should have done it, and many times on a stage, though, when I'd be sitting off to the side and Larry Knechtel would be playing the piano and Artie would be singing "Bridge", people would stomp and cheer when it was over, and I would think, "That's my song, man..."

== Personnel ==
- Art Garfunkel – lead vocals
- Paul Simon – backing vocals
- Larry Knechtel – piano
- Joe Osborn – bass guitar
- Hal Blaine – drums and percussion
- Jimmie Haskell, Ernie Freeman – string arrangements

== Critical reception ==
Billboard called it a "beautiful, almost religious-oriented ballad" whose "performance and arrangement are perfect". Cash Box said that "set in parable, this love ballad carries a two-level interpretation" and praised "Garfunkel's magnificent vocal performance and the material." Record World predicted that the song would "equal [the duo's] 'Boxer' success".

The song has also been lauded as one of the greatest by Simon & Garfunkel. In 2017, The Guardian called the song one of the best by the duo, describing it as "heart-stirring". The Independent similarly lauded the song in 2020, calling it "a transcendent experience" and ranking it as the best song by the group. In June 2026, CBS News included the song in its list of the 250 essential American songs of the past 250 years.

== Commercial performance ==
Despite the song's five-minute length, Columbia decided to release "Bridge over Troubled Water" for play on pop radio. AM radio had previously played Bob Dylan's "Like a Rolling Stone" in 1965, despite its running over the conventional three-minute playtime limit. This figured in Columbia's decision to release the five-minute version of "Bridge over Troubled Water" as a single. It reached number one on the Billboard Hot 100 chart on February 28, 1970, and stayed at the top of the chart for six weeks. "Bridge over Troubled Water" also topped the adult contemporary chart in the US for six weeks. Billboard ranked it as the No. 1 song for 1970. In Canada it was number one for four weeks and was in the top 10 for seven weeks.

The song was certified Gold for over one million copies in the US by the Recording Industry Association of America, and sold over six million copies worldwide.

== Awards ==
The single won the Grammy Award for Record of the Year, Song of the Year, Best Contemporary Song, and Best Arrangement, Instrumental and Vocals in the Grammy Awards of 1971, with its album also winning Album of the Year.

== Charts and certifications ==
=== Weekly charts ===
Weekly chart performance for "Bridge over Troubled Water"
Chart (1970)	Peak position
Australia (ARIA)	2
Austria (Ö3 Austria Top 40)	4
Belgium (Ultratop 50 Flanders)	23
Canada Adult Contemporary (RPM)	1
Canada Top Singles (RPM)	1
Finland (Suomen virallinen lista)	8
France (SNEP)	1
Indonesia (Aktuil)	1
Ireland (IRMA)	2
Netherlands (Dutch Top 40)	5
Netherlands (Single Top 100)	5
New Zealand (Recorded Music NZ)	1
Norway (VG-lista)	7
South Africa (Springbok Radio)	4
Spain (Promusicae)	2
Switzerland (Schweizer Hitparade)	5
UK Singles (Official Charts)	1
US Adult Contemporary (Billboard)	1
US Billboard Hot 100	1
West Germany (GfK)	3

=== Year-end charts ===
Year-end chart performance for "Bridge over Troubled Water"
Chart (1970)	Position
Australia	5
Canada Top Singles (RPM)	1
Netherlands (Dutch Top 40)	29
Netherlands (Single Top 100)	30
UK Singles (OCC)	5
US Billboard Hot 100	1

=== Certifications ===
Region	Certification	Certified units/sales
New Zealand (RMNZ)	Platinum	30,000^{‡}
United Kingdom (BPI)	Platinum	600,000^{‡}
United States (RIAA)	Gold	1,000,000^{^}
^{^} Shipments figures based on certification alone.^{‡} Sales+streaming figures based on certification alone.

=== US chart performance ===
"Bridge over Troubled Water" entered the Billboard Hot 100 top 40 at no.13 on February 9, 1970. It jumped to no.3 the following week before climbing to no.1. During a six-week run at the top – the most for any single that year – Simon and Garfunkel held off strong competition from Creedence Clearwater Revival ("Travelin' Band") and The Jaggerz ("The Rapper"). Then, on April 11, the song fell to no.5 – replaced by The Beatles' "Let It Be". "Bridge over Troubled Water" concluded a 13-week run in the US top 40 on 9 May as their follow-up hit "Cecilia" began its rise to no.4.

=== UK chart performance ===
As in the US, "Bridge over Troubled Water" made its UK top 40 bow at no.13, on February 28, 1970. The song climbed steadily over the next four weeks before claiming no.1 on March 28. During a three-week stay at the top, it held off strong competition from Mary Hopkin with "Knock, Knock Who's There?" and "Can't Help Falling in Love" by Andy Williams. Then, on April 18, the song fell to no.2 – replaced by "All Kinds of Everything" by Dana. In total, "Bridge over Troubled Water" spent seventeen weeks in the UK top 40 (concluding on June 27).

== Covers ==
"Bridge over Troubled Water" has been covered by over 50 artists, including Elvis Presley and Willie Nelson. Merry Clayton recorded a version in gospel style on her 1970 album Gimme Shelter. A cover was included on The Supremes' 1970 release New Ways But Love Stays with vocals by Jean Terrell, Mary Wilson, and Cindy Birdsong. Roberta Flack covered the song on her 1971 album Quiet Fire. A cover recorded by Johnny Cash and Fiona Apple for Cash's American IV: The Man Comes Around album was nominated for the Grammy Award for Best Country Collaboration with Vocals in 2003.

=== Aretha Franklin version ===
"Bridge over Troubled Water"

Single by Aretha Franklin

from the album Aretha's Greatest Hits
- B-side: "Brand New Me"
- Released: 1971
- Recorded: August 13, 1970
- Studio: Atlantic (New York City)
- Genre: Gospel; R&B
- Length: 5:31 (album version); 3:18 (single version)
- Label: Atlantic
- Producers: Jerry Wexler; Arif Mardin; Tom Dowd

Aretha Franklin singles chronology
"You're All I Need to Get By" (1971)	"Bridge over Troubled Water" (1971)	"Spanish Harlem" (1971)

Aretha Franklin's gospel-infused cover version was recorded in the summer of 1970, during the sessions for what would become her 1972 album Young, Gifted and Black. Franklin's rendition is recorded in the key of B major, and contains a brief interpolation of the Four Tops' 1970 hit "Still Water (Love)". Franklin debuted her version on March 5, 1971, during her landmark three-night stint at San Francisco's Fillmore West, which was later released as Aretha Live at Fillmore West. Eleven days later, she performed the song on television for the first time at the 13th Annual Grammy Awards, at which an already-disbanded Simon & Garfunkel won five Grammy Awards for the song. Franklin's Grammy performance was released decades later on the 1994 compilation Grammy's Greatest Moments Volume III. Paul Simon identified it as his favorite cover of a song he wrote. Franklin's rendition was included in CBS News's list of the 250 essential American songs of the past 250 years, one of five Franklin songs to make the list.

=== Elvis Presley ===
"Bridge over Troubled Water"

Song by Elvis Presley

from the album That's the Way It Is
- Released: 1970
- Recorded: 1970
- Genre: Country; soft rock
- Length: 4:35
- Label: RCA
- Producer: Felton Jarvis

In 1970, Elvis Presley covered the song for his album That's the Way It Is. He went on to include the song in many concerts until his death in 1977. Paul Simon commented on the cover by Presley, describing it as dramatic and unbelievable. Later in his life however, Simon described the cover as unoriginal and criticized Presley's version of the song.

=== Chet Atkins and Jerry Reed ===
Chet Atkins and Jerry Reed recorded an instrumental version of the song and released it on their 1970 album Me & Jerry. The song appears as the second song on the album's first side and features both Reed and Atkins playing guitar trading lines back and forth with each other. The album and their rendition of the song received generally positive reviews with the former going on to win the 1971 Grammy Award for Best Country Instrumental Performance.

=== Linda Clifford ===
"Bridge over Troubled Water"

Single by Linda Clifford

from the album Let Me Be Your Woman
- B-side: "Hold Me Close"
- Released: 1979
- Recorded: 1978
- Studio: Curtom Studios (Chicago, IL)
- Genre: Disco
- Length: 10:20 (album version); 4:08 (7-inch version)
- Label: RSO; Curtom
- Songwriter: Paul Simon
- Producer: Gil Askey

Linda Clifford singles chronology
"Gypsy Lady" (1978)	"Bridge over Troubled Water" (1979)	"Don't Give It Up" (1979)

Linda Clifford, Curtis Mayfield's protégée signed on his Curtom label, released an up-tempo disco version of "Bridge over Troubled Water" on her album Let Me Be Your Woman in March 1979. This epic version (10:20 in length) was produced by Gil Askey (jazz trumpet player and musical director for many Motown acts) and mixed by Jimmy Simpson, brother of Valerie Simpson from Ashford and Simpson. The song has two originalities, the first one being a 132 bpm tempo (considered the ideal tempo for disco dancing) when the Simon and Garfunkel original is 82 bpm and Aretha Franklin's cover is 76 bpm. It was the first time that this song was covered with a fast tempo. It also has a highly original "Brazilian cuica on a disco beat" break. It became a US disco number 11, pop number 41, R&B number 49 and UK number 28.

=== P.J.B. featuring Hannah and Her Sisters version ===
"Bridge over Troubled Water"

Single by P.J.B. featuring Hannah and Her Sisters
- Released: 1991
- Genre: Dance; house
- Length: 3:45
- Label: CBS; Columbia; Dance Pool
- Songwriter: Paul Simon
- Producer: Pete Bellotte

In 1991, P.J.B. featuring Hannah and Her Sisters, a UK group assembled by British songwriter, record producer and author Pete Bellotte and fronted by British singer Hannah Jones, released a dance cover of "Bridge over Troubled Water" which reached number 21 on the UK Singles Chart. The group appeared on Top of the Pops as the opening act on the 26 September 1991 episode.

==== Charts ====
Chart performance for "Bridge over Troubled Water"
Chart (1991)	Peak position
Europe (Eurochart Hot 100)	61
Europe (European Dance Radio)	24
Ireland (IRMA)	23
UK Singles (OCC)	21
UK Airplay (Music Week)	17
UK Dance (Music Week)	8
UK Club Chart (Record Mirror)	18

=== Clay Aiken version ===
In 2003, American Idol season two runner-up Clay Aiken performed "Bridge over Troubled Water" during the competition. After the final results were announced, RCA Records released the song as a double A-side single with "This Is the Night" in Canada and New Zealand; in the US, "This Is the Night" was credited as a solo release since it received a higher cumulative airplay audience. The double A-side charted at number one in both Canada and New Zealand, earning a sextuple-platinum sales certification in the former country and a platinum disc in the latter. On New Zealand's year-end chart for 2003, the single was ranked at number 38.

==== Charts ====
Chart performance for "Bridge over Troubled Water"
Chart (2003)	Peak position
Canada (Nielsen SoundScan)	1
New Zealand (Recorded Music NZ)	1
US Adult Contemporary (Billboard)	29

=== Cantonese version ===
A rewriting of the song with Cantonese lyrics ("Many hearts prevail" – zh:滔滔千里心) was collectively sung by many Hong Kong singers for public shows in Hong Kong to raise funds after the Eastern China flood of 1991. In 2009 it was also used in the Artistes 88 Fund Raising Campaign for the victims of Typhoon Morakot.

=== Dami Im version ===
Dami Im covered this song during the Family Heroes-themed sixth live show of the fifth season of Australian X Factor on September 29, 2013. Im's performance of the song debuted at number 15 on the Australian Singles Chart. Im later released a version of the song on her self-titled album, which debuted at number 1 in Australia, and was certified Platinum.

=== Artists for Grenfell Tower charity single ===
"Bridge over Troubled Water"

Single by Artists for Grenfell
- Released: June 21, 2017
- Recorded: June 2017
- Studio: Sarm Studios (London, England)
- Genre: Pop
- Length: 3:53
- Label: Syco
- Songwriter: Paul Simon
- Producers: Graham Stack; Tokio Myers; Trevor Horn

Music video
- "Bridge over Troubled Water" on YouTube

To raise money for the families of the victims of the Grenfell Tower fire in June 2017 and for The London Community Foundation, Simon Cowell arranged the recording and release of a charity single on June 21, 2017. London-born grime artist Stormzy featured prominently, having written a fresh 16-line intro to the song which specifically referenced the tragedy. The recording reached number one on the UK Singles Chart on June 23, 2017 after just two days of availability, and was certified gold by the BPI on January 31, 2020. The artists were awarded with the Power of Music Award at the 2017 MTV Europe Music Awards.

==== Artists ====
The song was performed by the following artists (in order of appearance):

==== Instruments ====
- Brian May (of Queen) – guitar
- Nile Rodgers – guitar
- Tokio Myers – piano
- Pete Townshend (of the Who) – guitar

==== Vocals ====
- Stormzy
- Robbie Williams
- James Blunt
- Rita Ora
- Craig David
- Dan Smith (of Bastille)
- Liam Payne
- Emeli Sandé
- Kelly Jones (of Stereophonics)
- Paloma Faith
- Louis Tomlinson
- Labrinth
- Jorja Smith
- WSTRN
- Leona Lewis
- Jessie J
- James Arthur
- Roger Daltrey (of the Who)
- Ella Eyre
- Anne-Marie
- Ella Henderson
- Louisa Johnson
- 5 After Midnight
- Angel
- Carl Barât (of the Libertines)
- Deno
- Donae'o
- Dua Lipa
- Fleur East
- Gareth Malone and The Choir for Grenfell
- Geri Halliwell (of Spice Girls)
- Gregory Porter
- Jessie Ware
- John Newman
- Jon McClure (of Reverend and the Makers)
- London Community Gospel Choir
- Matt Goss
- Matt Terry
- Mr Eazi
- Nathan Sykes
- Omar
- Pixie Lott
- Ray BLK
- Raye
- Shakka
- Shane Filan (of Westlife)
- Tom Grennan
- Tony Hadley (of Spandau Ballet)
- Tulisa

==== Charts ====
Chart performance for "Bridge over Troubled Water"
Chart (2017)	Peak position
Australia (ARIA)	53
Austria (Ö3 Austria Top 40)	32
Belgium (Ultratip Bubbling Under Flanders)	26
Finland Download (Latauslista)	23
France (SNEP)	111
Hungary (Single Top 40)	31
Ireland (IRMA)	25
New Zealand Heatseekers (RMNZ)	4
Scottish Singles Sales (Official Charts)	1
Switzerland (Schweizer Hitparade)	28
UK Singles (Official Charts)	1

==== Certifications ====
Region	Certification	Certified units/sales
United Kingdom (BPI)	Gold	400,000^{‡}
^{‡} Sales+streaming figures based on certification alone.

=== Other covers ===
Willie Nelson covered the song in the closing ceremony of the 2002 Winter Olympics in Salt Lake City.

Mary J. Blige, David Foster, and Andrea Bocelli performed the song on January 31, 2010, during the 52nd Grammy Awards ceremony, in the context of raising awareness for the victims of the Haiti earthquake. This version reached number 75 on the US Billboard Hot 100.

For BBC Children in Need in 2012, over 2,500 children sang the song in unison from 15 towns across the UK. The performance started in the studio before cutting between the choirs as they sang giving each choir around 15 seconds on air, this was all done in real time. However 5 of the choirs were not included in the link up shown on the night and were instead shown later on the highlights show. They were led by Aled Jones who conducted the choir in the London studio. The Choirs sang from: London at BBC Television Centre the studio where the main telethon was held, Aberdeen at The Beach Ballroom, Northumberland at The Alnwick Garden, Swindon at Steam: Museum of the Great Western Railway, Birmingham at The Mailbox, Belfast at The Broadcasting House, East Sussex at Glyndebourne, Cardiff at The BBC Hoddinott Hall, Scunthorpe at Baths Hall and Winchester at Intech. The choirs not included were: Cambridge at West Road Concert Hall, Exeter at The Forum Library, Exeter University, Leicestershire at Conkers Discovery Centre, Rotherham at Magna Science Adventure Centre and Salford at The BBC Philharmonic Studio at MediaCityUK.

On December 9, 2013, Tessanne Chin covered the song on season 5 of NBC's singing competition The Voice for the semifinal round. The song went to the number one spot on iTunes within 12 hours, with her becoming the first contestant to achieve the top chart position at the end of an applicable voting window that season.

"A Bridge over You", a charity single recorded and released independently by the Lewisham and Greenwich NHS Choir, the choir of the Lewisham and Greenwich NHS Trust located in south-east London, was a mashup of "Bridge over Troubled Water" and Coldplay's 2005 single "Fix You", with additional arrangement by the choir's conductor, Peter Mitchell. It reached number one on the UK Singles Chart at Christmas 2015.

In August 2019, Kodi Lee covered the song on America's Got Talent in the quarter-finals of the competition. Simon Cowell revealed that Paul Simon personally signed off to allow Lee to sing the song within thirty minutes of the show's producers asking for permission.

Irish musician Hozier performed the song for the RTÉ fundraising special RTÉ Does Comic Relief in Croke Park. The performance was dedicated to those who died during the COVID-19 pandemic.

Matt Bellamy from Muse released a cover on September 8, 2020, stating it is one of his "favorite songs of all time...We should all reach out and be there for our friends right now!"

At the 2022 Beijing Winter Olympics, the gold medalists in pair skating, Sui Wenjing & Han Cong, adapted the mixed cover of this song, by Linda Eder and John Legend, in their free skating programme with a score of 155.47 points.

Jacob Collier released an a capella rendition of the song featuring John Legend, Tori Kelly, and uncredited vocals from Yebba as part of his album Djesse Vol. 4 on February 22, 2024, as the last single. His rendition won a Grammy Award for Best Arrangement, Instrumental or A Cappella at the 67th Annual Grammy Awards.

Noah Kahan performed the song during the "In Memoriam" segment of the 78th Primetime Emmy Awards in 2026.
