= Do It All Night (album) =

Studio album by Curtis Mayfield
- Released: August 1978
- Recorded: Wally Heider, Los Angeles; Las Vegas Recording Center, Las Vegas; Curtom, Chicago
- Genres: Soul, disco
- Length: 35:31
- Label: Curtom
- Producer: Curtis Mayfield

Curtis Mayfield chronology
Never Say You Can't Survive (1977)	Do It All Night (1978)	Heartbeat (1979)

Do It All Night is an album by the American musician Curtis Mayfield, released in 1978. "No Goodbyes" was released as a single. "You Are, You Are" was written by Mayfield for Linda Clifford; it appears on her 1978 LP, If My Friends Could See Me Now. The album peaked at No. 52 on Billboard's Top Black Albums chart.

== Critical reception ==
Professional ratings
Review scores
Source	Rating
AllMusic	3/5 stars
The Virgin Encyclopedia of R&B and Soul	3/5 stars

The Globe and Mail noted that "two ballads, 'Keep Me Loving You' and 'In Love, In Love, In Love', add meat to the good side and keep Mayfield's reputation intact as the silkiest of black high tenors." The Bay State Banner, in 1978, deemed the album Mayfield's worst, writing: "Imagine this superb poet making music so dumb, so uninspired in its rhythms you didn't miss the libretto that wasn't there." Rolling Stone opined that "Mayfield sounds distracted or simply confused, as if he'd started a song with something in mind, forgotten what it was, but kept going anyway."

== Track listing ==
1. "Do It All Night" (Gil Askey, Curtis Mayfield) – 8:17
2. "No Goodbyes" (Askey, Mayfield) – 7:40
3. "Party, Party" (Askey, Mayfield) – 7:54
4. "Keeps Me Loving You" (Mayfield) – 3:24
5. "In Love, in Love, in Love" (Mayfield) – 4:20
6. "You Are, You Are" (Mayfield) – 3:38

== Personnel ==
- Curtis Mayfield - lead vocals, guitar
- Keni Burke - bass
- Donelle Hagan - drums
- Henry Gibson - bongos, congas
- Gary Thompson - rhythm guitar
- Joseph "Lucky" Scott - bass
- Floyd Morris, Rich Tufo - keyboards
- The Jones Girls, Kitty Haywood and the Haywood Singers - backing vocals
- Gil Askey - arrangements

Technical

- Jim Burgess - mixing
- Ed Thrasher, John Cabalka - art direction
- Brad Kanawyer - design
- Claude Mougin - photography
