= The Right Combination (Linda Clifford and Curtis Mayfield album) =

Studio album by Linda Clifford and Curtis Mayfield
- Released: September 1980
- Genre: Funk, soul
- Length: 32:09
- Label: RSO/Curtom
- Producer: Curtis Mayfield, Gil Askey, Norman Harris, Bruce Gray

Linda Clifford chronology
Here's My Love (1979)	The Right Combination (1980)	I'm Yours (1980)

Curtis Mayfield chronology
Something to Believe In (1980)	The Right Combination (1980)	Love is the Place (1982)

Professional ratings
Review scores
Source	Rating
AllMusic	2/5 stars
Smash Hits	4/10

The Right Combination is a 1980 duet album by Linda Clifford and Curtis Mayfield.

== History ==
Originally released on Curtom, it was recorded in Chicago except "It's Lovin' Time (Your Baby's Home)" recorded in Philadelphia. The album was produced by Curtis Mayfield and Gil Askey except “Ain't No Love Lost” solely by Mayfield and “It's Lovin' Time (Your Baby's Home)” by Curtis Mayfield, Norman Harris and Bruce Gray. Gil Askey arranged the album except “It's Lovin' Time (Your Baby's Home)” which was arranged by Norman Harris. Linda Clifford has collaborated with Gil Askey and Curtis Mayfield on her previous four albums for Curtom and with Norman Harris on an album released just before (Here's My Love). In 1980 she would sing "Red light" for the Fame soundtrack and collaborate with Isaac Hayes for her next album. The album was reissued on CD in 1999 in Britain with 11 bonus tracks (8 by Clifford, 3 by Mayfield) and a bonus 1972 radio interview of Mayfield on an additional CD.

== Track listing ==
Side one
No.	Title	Writer(s)	Length
1.	"Rock You to Your Socks"	Joey Carbone, Louis Lambert	4:34
2.	"The Right Combination"	Keith Echols, Alice Sanderson, Anthony Miller	4:43
3.	"I'm So Proud"	Curtis Mayfield	3:36
4.	"Ain't No Love Lost"	Mayfield	4:25

Side two
No.	Title	Writer(s)	Length
5.	"It's Lovin' Time (Your Baby's Home)"	Bruce Gray	6:21
6.	"Love's Sweet Sensation"	Frankie Blue	3:49
7.	"Between You Baby and Me"	Mayfield	4:40

== Personnel ==
- Lucky Scott, Keni Burke – bass
- Sonny Seals – saxophone
- Bruce Gaitsch, Ross Traut, Tom Ferrone, Curtis Mayfield – guitars
- Lonnie Reaves, Tim Tobias – keyboards
- Wendell Stewart – drums
- Alejo, Tony Carpenter, Henry Gibson – percussion, toys
- Curtom String and Horn Players – horns, strings
- Sol Bobrov – strings contractor
- Lenard Druss, Arthur Hoyle – horns contractor
- Henry Hicks, Jr., Alphonzo Surrett, Ricky Linton – background vocals on "Ain't No Love Lost", "Rock You to Your Socks", and "The Right Combination"
