= Zak Keith =

British musician

Zak Keith is a British multi-genred guitarist based in Switzerland. He has performed as a featured artist at the Montreux Jazz Festival and at venues such as the Nordic Business Forum. He has been photographed performing onstage in Nashville and with the Van Morrison band and members of Steve Winwood at the Montreux Jazz Festival. In recent years he has been performing with his band ″Zak & Frenz″ (comprising in-demand Jazz musicians) in prestigious venues in Bangkok, Thailand. From the early 1990s until 2001, he was the band leader for Bob Manning's Soul Enterprise. Active internationally, he has performed with artists such as Tommy Emmanuel, Angélique Kidjo, Julius E. Green of The Platters, Pete York of Spencer Davis Group, Jon Lord (of Deep Purple), the late "Master" Henry Gibson, the late Malando Gassama, Bernard Purdie and Eric Bibb. He has performed as part of an opening act for, or held various stage-management positions on assignment for, major international various artists, including Leif Garrett, John Farnham, Wilson Pickett, Isaac Hayes, Stevie Wonder and Michael Jackson. He has also appeared on television (in Sweden, Singapore, Turkey and Kurdish exile TV) as a solo artist, with Soul Enterprise, and as a sideman with artists such as Khaled Habib and Zakaria. He was also a notable contributor to the jam sessions at Stampen in 2001.

Zak Keith is also the author of several books, including an autobiographical work titled, My Life as a Squint-Eyed Chink.

== Discography ==
He landed a contract with Warner at age 17, to record with a rock band. He has worked as a sessionist for radio programs and various studios in Australia, the Far East and in Europe, appearing on the albums of various artists.

- Khaled Habib Live — Khaled Habib, 2003
- Nostalgia – Khaled Habib, 2004
- Two in Love — Brad Vee Johnson, 2007
- Shine On You — Dance Beat, EMI Dancebeat Records, 1996
- Love — Annika Ljungberg, Mother Earth Records, 1994
- Gotta Be Loved — Nevada, Warner, 1994
- You Want My Money — Mark Tysper, 1991
- Ice Breakers — Mona Lindberg, 2004
- 94-04: 10 År Med Klubb Rock — Compilation album, 2005
