= Short Eyes =

Short Eyes may refer to:

- Short Eyes (play), by Miguel Piñero
- Short Eyes (film), adaptation directed by Robert M. Young
- Short Eyes (album), by Curtis Mayfield
