= Linda (Linda Clifford album) =

Studio album by Linda Clifford
- Released: 1977
- Recorded: Curtom Studios (Chicago, Illinois)
- Genre: Soul, disco
- Label: Curtom
- Producer: Gil Askey, Leroy Hutson

Linda Clifford chronology
Linda (1977)	If My Friends Could See Me Now (1978)

Professional ratings
Review scores
Source	Rating
AllMusic	3/5 stars

Linda is the debut studio album recorded by American singer Linda Clifford, released in 1977 on the Curtom Records label.

== History ==
The album features the single "From Now On", which peaked at No. 94 on the Billboard Hot Soul Singles chart. The song also reached No. 28 on Hot Dance Club Play chart along with the song "You Can Do It".

== Track listing ==
Side one
No.	Title	Writer(s)	Length
1.	"From Now On"	Bunny Sigler	5:10
2.	"Be Tender with My Love"	Barry Gibb, Robin Gibb, Maurice Gibb	3:52
3.	"You Can Do It"	Evie Sands, Richard Germinaro, Ben Weisman	4:11
4.	"You Gotta Tell Her"	Van McCoy	3:37
5.	"One Thing on My Mind"	Evie Sands, Richard Germinaro	3:50

Side two
No.	Title	Writer(s)	Length
6.	"Tonight's the Night"	Rod Stewart	4:07
7.	"Only Fooling Myself"	Jerline Shelton, Maurice Commander	3:57
8.	"Still in Love with You"	Al Green, Al Jackson Jr., Willie Mitchell	3:29
9.	"If It's Magic"	Stevie Wonder	4:53

== Charts ==
Singles

Year	Single	Peak positions	
Year	Single	US R&B	US Dan
1977	"From Now On"	94	28
1977	"You Can Do It"	—	28
