= Unforgettable (Leroy Hutson album) =

Studio album by Leroy Hutson
- Released: 1979
- Genre: Funk/Soul; Chicago soul/R&B; Disco
- Length: 34:01
- Label: Curtom/RSO
- Producer: Leroy Hutson, Gil Askey

Leroy Hutson chronology
Closer to the Source (1978)	Unforgettable (1979)	Paradise (1982)

Professional ratings
Review scores
Source	Rating
AllMusic	1.5/5 stars

Unforgettable is the seventh solo album by Leroy Hutson.

== Track listing ==
All tracks composed by Alton Littles, Jr.; except where indicated

1. "Unforgettable" (Irving Gordon)
2. "(You Put the) Funk in My Life"
3. "Right or Wrong" (Leroy Hutson, Nate Hutson)
4. "So Nice"
5. "Lonely Without You" (Leroy Hutson, Nate Hutson)
6. "More Where That Came From"

== Personnel ==
- Leroy Hutson - vocals
- David Wolter, Joe Daniels, Ross Traut - guitar
- Keni Burke, Tony Brown - bass
- Calvin Bridges, Eric Hackett, Lonnie Reaves - keyboards
- Eric Hackett, Tim Tobias - synthesizer
- Chester Thompson, Wayne Stewart - drums
- Gil Askey, Tyrone "Rock" Deadrick - percussion
- Jerry Wilson (tracks: 5), Kenny Soderblom (tracks: 3, 4) - saxophone
- Alfonso Surrett, Alton Littles, Jr., Calvin Bridges, "Day" Askey Burke, Martin Dumas, Myrna Postel, Nate Hutson, Roz Thompson - background vocals
- Gil Askey - arrangements
- Elliot Gordon - photography

== Chart positions ==
Chart (1979)	Peak position
Top Black Albums (Billboard)	69

=== Singles ===
Year	Single	Chart	Chart position
1979	"Right or Wrong"	Billboard Hot Black Singles	47
