= Let Me Be Your Woman =

Studio album by Linda Clifford
- Released: 1979
- Recorded: Curtom Studios (Chicago, Illinois)
- Genre: Soul, disco
- Label: RSO/Curtom
- Producer: Gil Askey

Linda Clifford chronology
If My Friends Could See Me Now (1978)	Let Me Be Your Woman (1979)	Here's My Love (1979)

Singles from Diana
- 1. "Bridge over Troubled Water" Released: March 11, 1979; 2. "Don't Give It Up" Released: May 19, 1979; 3. "Sweet Melodies" Released: July 24, 1979

Professional ratings
Review scores
Source	Rating
AllMusic	3/5 stars

Let Me Be Your Woman is the third studio album recorded by American singer Linda Clifford, released in 1979 on the RSO/Curtom label.

== Chart performance ==
The album peaked at No. 19 on the R&B albums chart. It also reached No. 26 on the Billboard 200. The album features a disco-styled cover version of "Bridge over Troubled Water", which peaked at No. 49 on the Hot Soul Singles chart and No. 41 on the Billboard Hot 100. A second single, "Don't Give It Up", also charted at No. 15 on the Hot Soul Singles chart.

== Track listing ==
Side one
No.	Title	Writer(s)	Length
1.	"Hold Me Close"	Curtis Mayfield	4:48
2.	"Let Me Be Your Woman"	Ed Fournier	3:12
3.	"Don't Give It Up"	Gil Askey, Linda Clifford	9:26

Side two
No.	Title	Writer(s)	Length
4.	"I Can't Let This Good Thing Get Away"	Gil Askey	4:13
5.	"Don't Let Me Have Another Bad Dream"	Linda Clifford, Nicholas Coconato	3:54
6.	"Sweet Melodies"	James Mendell	7:55

Side three
No.	Title	Writer(s)	Length
7.	"One of Those Songs"	Will Holt, Gérard Calvi	11:46

Side four
No.	Title	Writer(s)	Length
8.	"Bridge over Troubled Water"	Paul Simon	10:20

== Charts ==
Chart (1979)	Peak
Australia Kent Music Report	90
U.S. Billboard Top LPs	26
U.S. Billboard Top Soul LPs	19

Singles

Year	Single	Peaks		
Year	Single	US	US R&B	US Dan
1979	"Bridge over Troubled Water"	41	49	11
1979	"Don't Give It Up"	—	15	11
