= Closer to the Source =

Closer to the Source may refer to:

- Closer to the Source (Leroy Hutson album)
- Closer to the Source (Dizzy Gillespie album)
