= If My Friends Could See Me Now (Linda Clifford album) =

Studio album by Linda Clifford
- Released: 1978
- Recorded: Curtom Studios (Chicago, Illinois)
- Genre: Soul, disco
- Length: 39:17
- Label: Curtom
- Producer: Gil Askey, Curtis Mayfield

Linda Clifford chronology
| Linda (1977) | If My Friends Could See Me Now (1978) | Let Me Be Your Woman (1979) |

Singles from If My Friends Could See Me Now
- 1. "Runaway Love" Released: April 1978; 2. "If My Friends Could See Me Now" Released: July 1978; 3. "Gypsy Lady" Released: November 1978

If My Friends Could See Me Now is the second studio album by American singer Linda Clifford, released in 1978 on the Curtom label.

== Chart performance ==
The album peaked at No. 9 on the R&B albums chart. It also reached No. 22 on the Billboard 200. The album features a disco-styled cover version of the title track, which peaked at No. 68 on the Hot Soul Singles chart and No. 54 on the Billboard Hot 100. Another single, "Runaway Love", also charted at No. 3 on the Hot Soul Singles chart and No. 76 on the Billboard Hot 100. Both tracks, along with the track "Gypsy Lady" peaked at No. 1 on the Hot Dance/Disco chart.

== Critical reception ==
Professional ratings
Review scores
| Source | Rating |
|---|---|
| AllMusic | 4/5 stars |

The Bay State Banner noted that "Clifford isn't really a disco singer—she lacks the idiom's prankish, frivolous attitude—but rather a torch chanteuse who simply lacks the bodily bulk to bring the red-hot mamma role off."

== Track listing ==
Side one
| No. | Title | Writer(s) | Length |
|---|---|---|---|
| 1. | "If My Friends Could See Me Now" | Cy Coleman, Dorothy Fields | 7:53 |
| 2. | "You Are, You Are" | Curtis Mayfield | 5:16 |
| 3. | "Runaway Love" | Gil Askey | 7:04 |

Side two
| No. | Title | Writer(s) | Length |
|---|---|---|---|
| 4. | "Broadway Gypsy Lady" | Curtis Mayfield | 3:41 |
| 5. | "I Feel Like Falling in Love Again" | Carl Wurzbach | 5:04 |
| 6. | "Please Darling, Don't Say Goodbye" | Gil Askey, Linda Clifford | 4:36 |
| 7. | "Gypsy Lady" | Curtis Mayfield, Gil Askey | 5:42 |

== Personnel ==
- Keni Burke – bass guitar
- Calvin Bridges, Rich Tufo, Eric Hackett – keyboards
- Eric Hackett – synthesizer
- Donnell Hagan – drums
- Curtis Mayfield, Ronnie Vann, William Ross Traut – guitars
- The Jones Girls – background vocals
- Sol Bobrov – horns and strings contractor

== Charts ==
=== Weekly charts ===
| Chart (1978) | Peak position |
|---|---|
| Australia Albums (Kent Music Report) | 86 |
| US Billboard 200 | 22 |
| US Top R&B/Hip-Hop Albums (Billboard) | 9 |

=== Year-end charts ===
| Chart (1978) | Position |
|---|---|
| US Top R&B/Hip-Hop Albums (Billboard) | 47 |

=== Singles ===
| Year | Single | Peaks | | |
| Year | Single | US | US R&B | US Dan |
|---|---|---|---|---|
| 1978 | "Runaway Love" | 76 | 3 | 1 |
| 1978 | "If My Friends Could See Me Now" | 54 | 68 | 1 |
| 1978 | "Gypsy Lady" | — | — | 1 |
