= Closer to the Source (Leroy Hutson album) =

Closer To The Source

Studio album by Leroy Hutson
- Released: 1978
- Recorded: 1977–1978
- Studio: Curtom, Chicago, Illinois
- Genre: Chicago soul, R&B
- Label: Curtom
- Producer: Leroy Hutson, Gil Askey, Bob Monaco

Leroy Hutson chronology
Hutson II (1976)	Closer To The Source (1978)	Unforgettable (1979)

Closer to the Source is an album by the American musician Leroy Hutson. It was released in 1978 on Curtom Records.

== Critical reception ==
Professional ratings
Review scores
Source	Rating
AllMusic	3/5 stars
The Virgin Encyclopedia of R&B and Soul	2/5 stars

The Morning Call praised the "excellent vocals buttressed by tight arrangements."

== Track listing ==
1. "In the Mood" (James Mendell) – 6:24
2. "Where Did Love Go?" (Leroy Hutson, Gil Askey) – 4:01
3. "They've Got Love" (Connie Davis, James Mendell) – 4:04
4. "Get to This (You'll Get to Me)" (Michael Hawkins, Leroy Hutson, Lonnie Reaves) – 3:40
5. "Closer to the Source" (Leroy Hutson, Lonnie Reaves, Alfonso Surrett) – 6:08
6. "Heaven Right Here (On Earth)" (Leroy Hutson, Lonnie Reaves) – 5:31
7. "Everybody's a Masterpiece" (George Clinton, Richard Reicheg) – 3:02
8. "You're a Winner" (Leroy Hutson) – 4:31

== Personnel ==
- Phil Upchurch, Ross Traut, Stephen Harris, Tom Ferrone - Guitar
- Al Radford, Bernard Reed, Larry Williams, Louis Satterfield - Bass
- Floyd Morris, James Mendell, Lonnie Reaves, Tom Washington - Keyboards
- Andre Fischer, Donnell Hagan - Drums
- Billy Howell, Donald Myrick, Elmer Brown, George Patterson, Jerry Wilson, Louis Satterfield, Michael Harris, Willie Henderson - Horns
- Earl DeRouen, Henry Gibson - Percussion
- Bobby Christian - Vibraphone
- The Curtom Strings - Strings
- Alfonso Surrett, Charles Beadle, Hank Ricks, Jackie Johnson, Jerline Brandy, Linda Clifford, Marie Marsh, Rickie Linton, Sherline Shelton - Backing Vocals

== Charts ==
=== Singles ===
Year	Single	US R&B
1978	"In the Mood"	56
1978	Where Did Love Go?"	45
