= Hutson (album) =

Studio album by Leroy Hutson
- Released: July 1975
- Recorded: 1975 at Curtom Studios, Chicago, Illinois
- Genre: Soul, Chicago soul, R&B
- Length: 28:28
- Label: Curtom
- Producer: Leroy Hutson

Leroy Hutson chronology
The Man! (1974)	Hutson (1975)	Feel The Spirit (1976)

Professional ratings
Review scores
Source	Rating
AllMusic	4/5 stars

Hutson is the third album recorded by R&B singer Leroy Hutson on Curtis Mayfield's Curtom record label. The album was to become the start of a creative peak for Hutson, and together with Feel The Spirit and Hutson II, marked him as one of Soul music's most talented and engaging artists.

== Track listing ==
All tracks composed by Leroy Hutson; except where indicated

1. "All Because of You" 7:03
2. "I Bless the Day" 4:03
3. "It's Different" 4:43
4. "Cool Out" (Leroy Hutson, Michael Hawkins) 3:00
5. "Lucky Fellow" (Leroy Hutson, Charles Boyd, Gerald Dickerson) 5:03
6. "Can't Stay Away" (Leroy Hutson, Michael Hawkins) 5:35
7. "So Much Love" 3:22

== Personnel ==
- Leroy Hutson - arranger, Fender Rhodes, piano, synthesizer, lead vocals
- Janice Hutson - spiritual advisor
- Roger Anfinsen - engineer
- Sol Bobrov - string conductor
- Ronald Coleman - keyboards
- Victor Chandler - bass
- Richard Fegley - album cover, photography
- Master Henry Gibson - congas
- Donnell Hagan - Clavinet, drums, percussion
- Michael Harris - trumpet
- Stephen Harris - guitar
- Kitty Haywood Singers - backing vocals
- John Janus - engineer
- Bill McFarland - trombone
- Beverly McLin - backing vocals
- Craig McMullen - guitar
- Jim Schubert - art director
- Joseph Scott - bass
- Rich Tuto - arranger
- Phil Upchurch - acoustic and electric guitars
- Jerry Wilson - tenor and alto saxophone

== Charts ==
Chart (1975)	Peak position
Top Soul LPs (Billboard)	46

=== Singles ===
Year	Single	Chart positions
Year	Single	US R&B
1975	"All Because of You"	36
1975	"Can't Stay Away"	46
