= Runaway Love (Linda Clifford song) =

Single by Linda Clifford

from the album If My Friends Could See Me Now
- B-side: "Broadway Gypsy Lady"
- Released: 1978
- Recorded: 1978
- Genre: Disco
- Length: 3:28 (7" version); 9:44 (12" version); 7:04 (Album version)
- Label: Curtom
- Songwriter: Gil Askey
- Producer: Gil Askey

Linda Clifford singles chronology
"You Can Do It" (1977)	"Runaway Love" (1978)	"If My Friends Could See Me Now" (1978)

"Runaway Love" is a 1978 disco single written and produced by Gil Askey, and performed by Linda Clifford. The Jones Girls performed the background vocals.

== Background and chart performance ==
The single was from Clifford's album, If My Friends Could See Me Now, and along with the tracks "If My Friends Could See Me Now" and "Gypsy Lady" reached number one on the US dance chart for five weeks. and peaked at No. 3 on the Hot Soul Singles chart. The single also peaked at No. 76 on the Billboard Hot 100

Chart (1978)	Peak position
US Billboard Hot 100	76
US Billboard Disco Top 80	1
US Billboard Hot Soul Singles	3

== See also ==
- List of number-one dance singles of 1978 (U.S.)
