= The Man! =

Studio album by Leroy Hutson
- Released: 1974
- Recorded: Fall 1973–1974
- Studio: Curtom Studios, Chicago, Illinois
- Genre: Soul, Chicago soul, R&B
- Length: 31:11
- Label: Curtom
- Producer: Leroy Hutson

Leroy Hutson chronology
Love Oh Love (1973)	The Man! (1974)	Hutson (1975)

The Man! is the second solo album by Leroy Hutson. The photography was by Joel Brodsky. The album expands on the lush arrangements of Love Oh Love.

Professional ratings
Review scores
Source	Rating
Allmusic	2/5 stars

== Track listing ==
1. "Can't Say Enough About Mom" (Leroy Hutson, Michael Hawkins) 6:14
2. "Gotta Move - Gotta Groove" (Daniel Reed, Quinton Joseph, Tony Green) 3:38
3. "Ella Weez" (Leroy Hutson, Michael Hawkins) 3:01
4. "Give This Love a Try" (Eugene Dixon, James Thompson) 3:35
5. "The Ghetto '74" (Donny Hathaway, Leroy Hutson) 4:34
6. "After The Fight" (Daniel Reed, Quinton Joseph, Tony Green) 3:17
7. "Could This Be Love" (Leroy Hutson, Michael Hawkins) 3:08
8. "Dudley Do-Right" (Daniel Reed, Quinton Joseph, Leroy Hutson) 3:44

== Personnel ==
- Leroy Hutson - clavinet, ARP synthesizer, electric piano, lead vocals
- Phil Upchurch - guitar, sitar
- Quinton Joseph - drums
- Michael Hawkins - electric piano
- Joseph "Lucky" Scott - bass
- Fred Walker (Derf Reklaw) - bongos, congas, tabla
- Jerry Wilson - tenor and alto saxophone
- Janice Hutson, The Natural Four, Galaxy, Eulaulah Hathaway - backing vocals
- Jerry Long - arrangements

== Charts ==
Year	Album	Chart positions	
Year	Album	US	US R&B
1974	The Man!	—	36

=== Singles ===
Year	Single	Chart positions		
Year	Single	US	US R&B	US Dance
1974	"Ella Weez"	—	81	—
