= Äntligen (song) =

2000 song by Marie Fredriksson

Single by Marie Fredriksson

from the album Äntligen – Marie Fredrikssons bästa 1984–2000
- B-side: "Solen gick ner över stan"
- Released: 20 March 2000
- Recorded: January–February 2000
- Studio: Studio Vinden, Djursholm
- Genre: Pop rock
- Length: 4:02
- Label: EMI Svenska AB
- Songwriters: Marie Fredriksson; Mikael Bolyos
- Producers: Fredriksson; Bolyos

Marie Fredriksson singles chronology
"Ber bara en gång" (1997)	"Äntligen" (2000)	"Det som var nu" (2000)

"Äntligen" (English: "Finally") is a pop rock song by Swedish singer-songwriter Marie Fredriksson, released on 20 March 2000 by EMI as the lead single from her first greatest hits compilation album, Äntligen – Marie Fredrikssons bästa 1984–2000. The track was written and produced by Fredriksson alongside her husband Mikael Bolyos, and recorded at the couple's home studio in Djursholm. The song was a minor hit in her home country upon release, peaking at number 34 and spending eight weeks on the Swedish Singles Chart. A remixed version of the song, titled "Solen gick ner över stan" ("The Sun Went Down over the City"), appeared as the b-side; an edited version of this remix also appeared as a bonus track on the parent compilation.

== Track listing ==
- CD single (EMI 7243 8 88456–2 5)
1. "Äntligen" (Album Version) – 4:02
2. "Solen gick ner över stan" (Klubbmix) (Original Version) – 5:13
- Promotional CD (EMI 7243 8 888252–2 1)
1. "Äntligen" (Radio Edit) – 3:33
2. "Solen gick ner över stan" (Klubbmix) (Radio Edit) – 3:33

== Credits and personnel ==
Credits adapted from the liner notes of the CD single.

Musicians

- Marie Fredriksson – lead and background vocals and production
- Mikael Bolyos – keyboards, programming, musical arrangement, engineering, production and mixing
- Ove Andersson – bass guitar
- Anders Garstedt – trumpet and flugelhorn
- Karin Hammar – trombone
- Christer Jansson – drums and percussion
- Magnus Lindgren – arrangement, tenor and baritone saxophones
- Mattias Torell – acoustic and electric guitars

Technical

- Kjell Andersson – sleeve design
- Mattias Edwall – photography
- Roger Krieg – mixing
- Pär Wickholm – sleeve design

== Charts ==
Chart (2000)	Peak position
Sweden (Sverigetopplistan)	34
