= Heaven Right Here on Earth =

Heaven Right Here On Earth

Studio album by The Natural Four
- Released: 1975
- Recorded: 1975
- Studio: Curtom Studios, Chicago, Illinois
- Genre: Soul, funk
- Length: 29:48
- Label: Curtom Records
- Producer: Leroy Hutson, Joseph Scott, Quinton Joseph, Rich Tufo

The Natural Four chronology
The Natural Four (1974)	Heaven Right Here On Earth (1975)	Nightchaser (1976)

Professional ratings
Review scores
Source	Rating
Allmusic	3/5 stars

Heaven Right Here on Earth is the third album by the Oakland, California group The Natural Four. It was released in 1975 on Curtom Records.

== Track listing ==
1. "Heaven Right Here on Earth" - (Joe Reaves, Leroy Hutson) 4:15
2. "Love's So Wonderful" - (Hutson) 3:25
3. "Count On Me" - (Lowrell Simon, Rich Tufo, Tommy Green) 4:05
4. "Baby Come On" - (Joseph Scott) 3:40
5. "What Do You Do" - (Daniel Reed, Othie Wright, Quinton Joseph, Tufo, Green) 2:53
6. "Give This Love a Try" - (Eugene Dixon, James Thompson) 3:43
7. "What's Happening Here" - (Wright, Joseph, Tufo, Green) 4:32
8. "While You're Away" - (Hutson, Michael Hawkins) 3:15

== Charts ==
Chart (1975)	Peak position
Billboard Pop Albums	182
Billboard Top Soul Albums	49

=== Singles ===
Year	Single	Chart positions
Year	Single	US R&B
1975	"Heaven Right Here On Earth"	68
1975	"Love's So Wonderful"	87
