= Something to Believe In (Curtis Mayfield album) =

Studio album by Curtis Mayfield
- Released: 1980
- Length: 35:41
- Label: Curtom
- Producers: Curtis Mayfield, Gil Askey, Keni Burke

Curtis Mayfield chronology
Heartbeat (1979)	Something to Believe In (1980)	The Right Combination (with Linda Clifford) (1980)

Something to Believe In is a studio album by the American musician Curtis Mayfield, released in 1980. It peaked at No. 128 on the Billboard 200. The cover art is by Ernie Barnes.

== Critical reception ==
Professional ratings
Review scores
Source	Rating
AllMusic	3.5/5 stars
The Virgin Encyclopedia of R&B and Soul	2/5 stars

In 2015, The Guardian wrote: "The choicest track off the 1980 set, 'Tripping Out' was a dreamy love song that swapped Mayfield’s typical syncopated grooves for a solid 4/4 stomp, wreathed in his trademark strings, a bassline thick and sturdy enough to rest a pint on, and Mayfield’s gleeful, thankful love cries."

== Track listing ==
All tracks composed by Curtis Mayfield, except where noted.

No.	Title	Writer(s)	Producer(s)	Length
1.	"Love Me, Love Me Now"		Mayfield	7:58
2.	"Never Let Me Go"	Joseph Scott	Mayfield	3:07
3.	"Tripping Out"	Bunny Sigler	Mayfield	7:02
4.	"People Never Give Up"		Mayfield	5:52
5.	"It's All Right"		Mayfield	3:56
6.	"Something to Believe In"		Mayfield	4:47
7.	"Never Stop Loving Me"	Mayfield, Keni Burke, Deidra Burke	Mayfield	3:34

== Personnel ==
- Curtis Mayfield – vocals, guitar
- Keni Burke, Joseph "Lucky" Scott – bass
- Wendell Stewart – drums
- Ross Traut, Tom Ferrone – guitar
- Arthur Hoyle, Bill Porter, Dale Clevenger, Gil Askey, Lenard Druss, Paul Howard, Robert Lustrea, Sonny Seals – horns
- Rich Tufo, Tim Tobias – keyboards
- Alejo, Tony Carpenter – percussion
- Adrian Gola, Arnie Roth, Elizabeth Cifani, Frank Borgognone, Fred Spector, Harold D. Klatz, John Frigo, Karl Fruh, Leonard Chausow, Roger Moulton, Sol Bobrov, William Schoen – strings

Technical

- Fred Breitberg, Roger Anfinsen – engineer
- Ernie Barnes – cover painting
