= Heartbeat (Curtis Mayfield album) =

Studio album by Curtis Mayfield
- Released: 1979
- Genre: Disco, soul
- Length: 44:52
- Label: Curtom
- Producer: Norman Harris, Ronald Tyson, Bunny Sigler, Curtis Mayfield

Curtis Mayfield chronology
Do It All Night (1978)	Heartbeat (1979)	Something to Believe In (1980)

Heartbeat is a studio album by the American musician Curtis Mayfield, released in 1979. It peaked at No. 42 on the Billboard 200.

== Production ==
The album was produced by Norman Harris, Ronald Tyson, Bunny Sigler, and Mayfield. "Between You Baby and Me" is a duet with Linda Clifford.

== Critical reception ==
Professional ratings
Review scores
Source	Rating
MusicHound Rock: The Essential Album Guide	4/5 stars
The Virgin Encyclopedia of R&B and Soul	3/5 stars

The Baltimore Sun wrote that "the more extroverted demands of disco music have made Mr. Mayfield reveal a more dynamic approach to his music." The Jersey Journal said that Mayfield "brings his cool falsetto to some rather pedestrian disco." The Bristol Evening Post called Heartbeat "a typical album of work, intelligent, lyrical and richly satisfying." The Ottawa Citizen concluded that "songs like 'Victory' and 'Over the Hump' show that the ideas are still flowing and that they make their best points when Mayfield stays closest to his soul, rhythm and blues roots."

== Track listing ==
No.	Title	Writer(s)	Producer(s)	Length
1.	"Tell Me, Tell Me (How Ya Like to Be Loved)"	Mayfield	Mayfield	6:24
2.	"What Is My Woman For?"	Bunny Sigler	Mayfield	7:17
3.	"Between You Baby and Me"	Mayfield	Mayfield	4:43
4.	"Victory"	Mayfield	Mayfield	3:18
5.	"Over the Hump"	Sigler	Mayfield	5:15
6.	"You Better Stop"	Sigler	Mayfield	6:51
7.	"You're So Good to Me"	Mayfield, Gil Askey, Keni Burke (bassline)	Mayfield	6:54
8.	"Heartbeat"	Mayfield, Askey	Mayfield	4:23
9.	"Tomorrow Night for Sure" (bonus track on CD)	Mayfield	Mayfield	4:35
