= The Natural Four (album) =

Studio album by The Natural Four
- Released: 1974
- Recorded: 1974
- Studio: Curtom Studios, Chicago, Illinois
- Genre: Soul, funk
- Label: Curtom
- Producer: Leroy Hutson, Lowrell Simon, Joseph Scott

The Natural Four chronology
| Good Vibes (1970) | The Natural Four (1974) | Heaven Right Here On Earth (1975) |

Professional ratings
Review scores
| Source | Rating |
|---|---|
| Allmusic | 3/5 stars |

The Natural Four is the second album by the Oakland, California group The Natural Four, released in 1974 on Curtom Records.

== Track listing ==
1. "Can This Be Real" (Janice Hutson, Leroy Hutson, Michael Hawkins) - 3:28
2. "You Bring Out the Best in Me" (Leroy Hutson, Michael Hawkins) - 4:37
3. "Try Love Again" (Joe Reaves, Leroy Hutson, Michael Hawkins) - 4:28
4. "You Can't Keep Running Away" (Leroy Hutson, Michael Hawkins) - 3:28
5. "This Is What's Happening Now" (A.J. Tribble, George Davis) - 4:08
6. "Love That Really Counts" (Janice Hutson, Leroy Hutson, Michael Hawkins, Joe Reaves) - 4:20
7. "Try to Smile" (Larry Brownlee, Lowrell Simon) - 2:58
8. "Love's Society" (Leroy Hutson, Joseph Scott, Roger Anfinsen) - 3:20
9. "Things Will Be Better Tomorrow" (Rich Tufo) - 3:30

== Personnel ==
The Natural Four

- Darryl Cannady
- Delmos Whitley
- Ollan Christopher James
- Steve Striplin

== Charts ==
| Chart (1974) | Peak position |
|---|---|
| Billboard Top Soul Albums | 36 |

=== Singles ===
| Year | Single | Chart positions | |
| Year | Single | US Hot 100 | US R&B |
|---|---|---|---|
| 1974 | "Can This Be Real" | 31 | 10 |
| 1974 | "Love That Really Counts" | 98 | 23 |
| 1974 | "You Bring Out the Best in Me" | — | 20 |
