= If My Friends Could See Me Now =

Song from the 1966 musical "Sweet Charity"

"If My Friends Could See Me Now", with music by Cy Coleman and lyrics by Dorothy Fields, is a song from the 1966 Broadway musical Sweet Charity. In the musical the character of Charity, played in the original New York cast by Gwen Verdon, reflects on her marvellous luck as she spends time with Vittorio. In the 1969 film adaptation of Sweet Charity, "If My Friends Could See Me Now" is performed by Shirley MacLaine.

== Recorded versions ==
=== As a show tune ===
Gwen Verdon's rendition of "If My Friends Could See Me Now" is featured on the cast recording for the original 1966 Broadway production of Sweet Charity: the song also appears on the cast recordings for the 1986 and 2005 Broadway revivals of Sweet Charity being performed by respectively Debbie Allen and Christina Applegate.

The Gwen Verdon recording of "If My Friends Could See Me Now" was utilized as the theme song for the pilot episode of the CBS-TV sitcom The Nanny although an original song entitled "The Nanny Named Fran" served as the theme song for the series' subsequent episodes: airings of The Nanny's pilot episode in syndication utilize "The Nanny Named Fran" as that episode's theme song rather than "If My Friends Could See Me Now".

The original cast recording for the 1967 West End production of Sweet Charity features "If My Friends Could See Me Now" performed by Juliet Prowse. Bonnie Langford, who headlined the 1998 West End revival of Sweet Charity, included "If My Friends Could See Me Now" in a medley of songs from Sweet Charity featured on her 1999 album Now.

A 1995 studio recording of the score of Sweet Charity features Jacqueline Dankworth performing "If My Friends Could See Me Now".

Shirley Maclaine's performance of the song is featured on the 1969 movie soundtrack for Sweet Charity; in addition Maclaine recorded the song for her 1976 Live at the Palace album.

=== Linda Clifford version ===
"If My Friends Could See Me Now"

Single by Linda Clifford

from the album If My Friends Could See Me Now
- B-side: "Please Darling, Don't Say Goodbye"
- Released: 1978
- Genre: Disco
- Length: 3:48 (7" version); 10:12 (12" version); 7:53 (Album version)
- Label: Curtom
- Songwriters: Cy Coleman, Dorothy Fields
- Producer: Gil Askey

Linda Clifford singles chronology
"Runaway Love" (1978)	"If My Friends Could See Me Now" (1978)	"Gypsy Lady" (1978)

In 1978, Linda Clifford released an album entitled If My Friends Could See Me Now featuring a disco version of the Sweet Charity song of that name. Clifford, who had been an extra in the filming of Sweet Charity, originally responded negatively to the suggestion – made by a secretary at Curtom Records – that she record a dance version of "If My Friends Could See Me Now" "because I thought it would be sacrilegious. I've always been a theatre buff, so this [would be] a no-no. Then they recorded [the backing track] anyway and brought it to me, and I said, 'Ooh, I like that.' Once I heard the music I was like, 'It’s different but it’s the same.'" Clifford would recall how subsequent to her success with "If My Friends Could See Me Now" Cy Coleman would "[call] in to a radio station that I was being interviewed on and thanked me over the air for doing his song and bringing it to the masses."

"If My Friends Could See Me Now" in tandem with two other album tracks: "Gypsy Lady" and "Runaway Love", hit #1 on the Billboard disco chart dated April 29, 1978 remaining at #1 for a total of five weeks. Released as a 7" single in August 1978 – "Runaway Love" having been the lead 7" single from the If My Friends... album - "If My Friends Could See Me Now" reached #54 on the Billboard Hot 100 with an R&B chart peak of #68. In the UK "If My Friends Could See Me Now" was issued as the A-side of a 7" single - with "Runaway Love" as the B-side - in May 1978 failing to become a major UK hit with a peak of #50 on the UK chart dated June 24, 1978.

=== Other versions ===
- Lady Gaga recorded a version of the song for Harlequin (2024), her companion album to the American musical thriller film Joker: Folie à Deux (2024).
- Kathie Lee Gifford sang a modified version for Carnival Cruise Line commercials in the 1980s and early 1990s.
