= Never Say You Can't Survive =

Never Say You Can’t Survive

Studio album by Curtis Mayfield
- Released: 1977
- Genres: Funk; soul
- Length: 33:45
- Label: Curtom
- Producer: Curtis Mayfield

Curtis Mayfield chronology
Short Eyes (1977)	Never Say You Can’t Survive (1977)	Do It All Night (1978)

Never Say You Can't Survive is an album by the American musician Curtis Mayfield, released in 1977. It peaked at No. 173 on the Billboard 200. "Show Me Love" was released as a single.

== Critical reception ==
Professional ratings
Review scores
Source	Rating
AllMusic	2.5/5 stars
The Virgin Encyclopedia of R&B and Soul	2/5 stars

Rolling Stone noted that Mayfield's "voice, which grows thinner and more strained with each album, fails to command the focus of the big, multisectioned arrangements."

== Track listing ==
All tracks are written by Curtis Mayfield.

No.	Title	Length
1.	"Show Me Love"	5:16
2.	"Just Want to Be with You"	3:14
3.	"When We're Alone"	5:27
4.	"Never Say You Can't Survive"	3:22
5.	"I'm Gonna Win Your Love"	4:43
6.	"All Night Long"	4:15
7.	"When You Used to Be Mine"	3:41
8.	"Sparkle"	4:02

- Note that track 8, "Sparkle", is also on the Mayfield-written-and-produced soundtrack to the 1976 film Sparkle.

== Personnel ==
- Curtis Mayfield – vocals, lead guitar
- Gary Thompson – rhythm guitar
- Joseph Scott – bass
- Floyd Morris, Rich Tufo – keyboards
- Donnell Hagan – drums
- Henry Gibson – bongos, congas
- Cliff Davis, Sonny Seals – tenor saxophone
- Kitty and the Haywoods – backing vocals
- James Mack, Rich Tufo – arrangements
