= Paradise (Leroy Hutson album) =

Studio album by Leroy Hutson
- Released: 1982
- Genre: Funk/Soul; Chicago soul/R&B; Disco
- Length: 38:05
- Label: Elektra
- Producer: Leroy Hutson

Leroy Hutson chronology
Unforgettable (1979)	Paradise (1982)	Soothe You, Groove You (2009)

Professional ratings
Review scores
Source	Rating
AllMusic	2.5/5 stars

Paradise is the eighth solo album by Leroy Hutson, the first (and only) album to be released for Elektra Records, after his contract with Curtom Records ended.

== Track listing ==
1. "Classy Lady" 5:30
2. "Nice and Easy" 4:30
3. "You Make it Happen" 4:57
4. "Paradise" 5:40
5. "She's Got It" 7:57
6. "Nobody But You" 4:44
7. "Stay At It" 5:36

== Personnel ==
- Leroy Hutson - lead & background vocals, drums, horn arrangements, keyboards, percussion, rhythm arrangements, synthesizer bass, vocal arrangements
- Dina Andrews - direction
- Jerry Butler, Stephen Harris, Nicholas Caldwell - composers
- Ken Cooper - trumpet
- Nicholas Caldwell - mouth organ, producer, rhythm arrangements, vocal arrangements
- Melvin Coleman, Reggie Gillerson - bass
- Steve Barri Cohen, David Egerton, Ann Fry, Larry Miles. Jeffrey Norman, Rick Sanchez - engineers
- Charles Waring - liner notes
- Ron Slenzak - photography
- Norman Ung - art direction
- David Nathan - tape research
- Orville McFarland - trombone
- Giovanni Scatola - mastering
- Rick Sanchez - mixing
- Bill Englot - remastering
- Tom Ferrone, Stephen Harris, Larry Michael White, Rick Sanchez, Larry Andrew Williams - guitars
- Pat Leonard, Lonnie Reaves, Tim Tobias, Grady Wilkins, Jerry Wilson - keyboards
- Eric Hackett, Tim Tobias - synthesizer
- Chester Thompson, Wayne Stewart - drums
- Stephen Harris, Kenneth Nash, Lonnie Reaves - percussion
- Rick Conrad - reissuing series
- Jerry Wilson - saxophone
- Alfonso Surrett, Alton Littles Jr., Calvin Bridges, "Day" Askey Burke, Martin Dumas, Myrna Postel, Nate Hutson, Roz Thompson - background vocals
