= Soul Enterprise =

The Soul Enterprise is often described as more of a fraternity than a band per se. It was founded in 1990, by vocalist Bob Manning from the US, with other American musicians based in Sweden, such as Jair-Rohm Parker Wells and Bill Bryant. It featured the sounds of old-school Soul music, with a blend of jazz improvisation.

In the beginning years, the group's founding members were busy freelancing for other acts besides the Soul Enterprise, such as Dr. Alban and Jennifer Brown. A period of instability followed, with many different substitute musicians playing in the band. The group went through major reforms and a complete change of members followed under the leadership of guitarist Zak Keith in 1992. The new line-up of first-call musicians included some of Stockholm's best, many considered to be world-class musicians, such as Morgan Ågren (drums), Anders Johnsson (bass), Micke Wennergrund (drums), Lasse Pollack (keyboards), Magnus Lindgren (Saxophone), Micke Sörensen (trumpet), Mia Gejrot, Anna Sandberg-Häll and Tonja Hedtjärn (voc). Magnus Lindgren went on to play with Herbie Hancock at age 18; Micke Sörensen went on to work with former Supremes member Mary Wilson. Lasse Pollack toured with Glenn Hughes in Japan.

The Soul Enterprise was voted best Soul band of Scandinavia by Fasching Jazz Club in 1998. Dagens Nyheter (a major Swedish newspaper) credited Bob Manning and the Soul Enterprise as a major influence in keeping Soul music alive in Scandinavia. Its musicians work as sessionists and have appeared on numerous records, together and individually.

== Discography ==
- Dance Beat, Shine On You, EMI Dancebeat Records, 1996
- Scrappy G, Mobbin Trow da City, MCA Music Entertainment, 1996
- André De Lange, A Friend, BIEM/NCB/GEMA, 1996
- Jazz On The Corner, Various Artists, Arietta Disks Musikprod. AB, 1995
- Chicago Express, Permanently Blue, Amigo Musik, 1995
- Totally Wired, Sweden, Soul Sister, Acid Jazz, 1994
- Blue Connection, Live at Clipper Club, Dragon Records Sweden, 1993
- All That Blues, From Sweden, Jefferson Rec, 1993
- En Blå Timme, That's Entertainment, TER Records 1993
