= Here's My Love =

Studio album by Linda Clifford
- Released: 1979
- Recorded: Rusk Studios (Los Angeles, California); Sigma Sound Studios (Philadelphia, Pennsylvania); PS Studios (Chicago, Illinois); Curtom Studios (Chicago, Illinois)
- Genre: Soul; disco
- Label: RSO; Curtom
- Producer: Juergen Koppers; Norman Harris; Ron Tyson; Curtis Mayfield

Linda Clifford chronology
Let Me Be Your Woman (1979)	Here's My Love (1979)	The Right Combination (with Curtis Mayfield) (1980)

Professional ratings
Review scores
Source	Rating
AllMusic	2.5/5 stars

Here's My Love is the fourth studio album recorded by American singer Linda Clifford, released in 1979 on the RSO/Curtom label.

== Chart performance ==
The album peaked at No. 47 on the R&B albums chart. It also reached No. 117 on the Billboard 200. The album features the single "I Just Wanna Wanna", which peaked at No. 36 on the Hot Soul Singles chart. In addition, all the cuts of the album peaked at No. 73 on the Hot Dance/Disco chart.

== Track listing ==
Side one
No.	Title	Writer(s)	Length
1.	"King for a Night"	Norman Harris, Ron Tyson	3:10
2.	"Here's My Love"	Keith Echols, Anthony Miller	5:15
3.	"I Just Wanna Wanna"	Russell Stone, Thor Baldursson	5:06
4.	"Bailin' Out"	Norman Harris, Ron Tyson	4:24

Side two
No.	Title	Writer(s)	Length
5.	"Never Gonna Stop"	J.P. Pennington	4:39
6.	"Lonely Night"	Leroy Gómez	7:12
7.	"Repossessed"	Norman Harris, Ron Tyson	5:36

== Charts ==
Chart (1979)	Peak
U.S. Billboard Top LPs	117
U.S. Billboard Top Soul LPs	47

Singles

Year	Single	Peaks	
Year	Single	US R&B	US Dan
1979	"I Just Wanna Wanna"	36	73
