= Love Oh Love =

1973 debut colo album by Leroy Hutson

Studio album by Leroy Hutson
- Released: 1973
- Recorded: 1973
- Studio: Curtom Studios, Chicago, Illinois
- Genre: Soul, Chicago soul, R&B
- Length: 28:28
- Label: Curtom
- Producer: Leroy Hutson

Leroy Hutson chronology
Love Oh Love (1973)	The Man! (1974)

Professional ratings
Review scores
Source	Rating
Allmusic	4.5/5 stars

Love Oh Love is the 1973 debut solo album by Leroy Hutson, who had been the lead singer of The Impressions after he replaced former lead singer Curtis Mayfield, who left the group to embark on his own solo recording career in 1970. The photography was by Joel Brodsky. The album was the first release by Hutson on Mayfield's Curtom record label.

== Track listing ==
All tracks composed by Leroy Hutson; except where indicated

1. "So In Love With You" (Leroy Hutson, Michael Hawkins) 2:57
2. "Love, Oh Love" (Janice Hutson, Leroy Hutson, Michael Hawkins) 3:52
3. "When You Smile" (Joe Reaves, Leroy Hutson, Maurice Commander) 4:18
4. "Getting it On" (Instrumental - Theme from The Jay Johnson Affair) 3:55
5. "Time Brings On A Change" 4:39
6. "I'll Be There, I'll Still Care" (Leroy Hutson, Michael Hawkins) 3:06
7. "I'm In Love With You, Girl" 2:40
8. "As Long As There's Love Around" 3:11

== Personnel ==
- Leroy Hutson - lead vocals, arrangements, percussion, synthesizer (ARP), electric piano
- Morris Beeks - organ
- Sol Bobrov - strings leader
- Joel Brandon - flute
- Victor Chandler - bass
- Aaron Dodd - tuba
- Michael Harris - trumpet
- Scotty Harris - drums
- Stephen Harris - lead guitar
- Billy Howell - trombone
- The Imaginations, The Identicals, Janice Hutson - background vocals
- Bill McFarland - trombone
- Miller Pertum - vibraphone
- Joe Reaves - percussion
- Sonny Seals - tenor saxophone
- Norman Shobey - congas
- Rich Tufo - string arrangements
- Tom Washington - arranger
- Jerry Wilson - alto saxophone

== Charts ==
=== Singles ===
Year	Single	Chart positions
Year	Single	US R&B
1973	"When You Smile"	81
