= Good Vibes (The Natural Four album) =

Studio album by The Natural Four
- Released: 1970
- Recorded: 1969–1970
- Studio: Sierra Sound Laboratories, Berkeley, California
- Genre: Soul; Funk
- Label: ABC
- Producer: Willie Hoskins

The Natural Four chronology
Good Vibes (1970)	The Natural Four (1974)

Professional ratings
Review scores
Source	Rating
Allmusic	4/5 stars

Good Vibes is the debut album by the Oakland, California group The Natural Four. Released in 1970 on ABC Records, this would be their only release with the label before moving on to Curtis Mayfield's Curtom Records imprint.

== Track listing ==
1. "Why Should We Stop Now" (Ricky Jones) - 3:17
2. "I Thought You Were Mine" (Lonnie Cook) - 2:35
3. "The Situation Needs No Explanation" (Earl Randle) - 2:41
4. "Same Thing in Mind" (Ricky Jones) - 3:19
5. "Stepping On Up" (Al Bowden, Lloyd Gregory, Ollan Christopher James) - 2:44
6. "Hurt" (Marvin Holmes) - 3:10
7. "Going in Circles" (Anita Poree, Jerry Peters) - 3:21
8. "All God's Children Got Soul" (Booker T. Jones, William Bell) - 3:09
9. "Blue Velvet" (Bernie Wayne, Lee Morris) - 5:53
10. "Message from a Black Man" (Norman Whitfield, Barrett Strong) - 3:27

== Charts ==
=== Singles ===
Year	Single	Chart positions
Year	Single	US R&B
1969	"Why Should We Stop Now"	31
