= Magnus Lindgren Fyra =

Fyra is a 2012 album by Swedish jazz musician Magnus Lindgren. In 2012 he performed concerts with Nils Landgren, Bohuslän Big Band, and Wermland Operas Orchestra in the project "Folk Notes, Tunes and Jazz", for which Lindgren arranged the music, conducted both orchestras, and performed as a soloist. Sweden's Orchestra Journal called the concert "Sweden's answer to Quincy Jones".

== Track listing ==
1. Park Avenue (Lindgren)
2. Fyra (Lindgren)
3. Visa från Rättvik (trad. arr: Magnus Lindgren)
4. Chinatown Run (Lindgren)
5. Raval (Lindgren)
6. Monday Afternoon (Lindgren)
7. Istanbul (Lindgren)
8. Soho Blues (Lindgren)
9. I Just Can't Stop Loving You (Michael Jackson)

== Personnel ==
- Magnus Lindgren – tenor sax, clarinet, flute
- Anke Helfrich – piano
- Daniel Karlsson – piano
- Palle Danielsson – bass
- Jonas Holgersson – drums
