= Feel the Spirit =

Feel The Spirit

Studio album by Leroy Hutson featuring The Free Spirit Symphony
- Released: February 1976; 49 years ago
- Recorded: 1975–1976 at Curtom Studios, Chicago, Illinois, U.S.
- Genre: Funk/Soul; Chicago soul/>R&B
- Length: 32:22
- Label: Curtom
- Producer: Leroy Hutson

Leroy Hutson featuring The Free Spirit Symphony chronology
Hutson (1975)	Feel The Spirit (1976)	Hutson II (1976)

Professional ratings
Review scores
Source	Rating
Allmusic	3/5 stars

Feel The Spirit is the fourth solo album by Leroy Hutson. It was released February 1976 on Curtom Records. Feel The Spirit was the second album released during Hutson's creative peak, and widely considered to be his best.

== Track listing ==
1. "It's The Music" (Leroy Hutson, Stephan Harris) 4:50
2. "Let's Be Lonely Together" (Leroy Hutson, Donnell Hagan, Michael Hawkins) 3:32
3. "Never Know What You Can Do (Give It a Try)" (Leroy Hutson, Michael Hawkins) 3:57
4. "Lover's Holiday" (Leroy Hutson, Michael Hawkins) 3:47
5. "Feel The Spirit ('76)" (Leroy Hutson) 5:54
6. "Don't Let It Get Next to You" (Leroy Hutson, Michael Hawkins) 3:39
7. "Butterfat" (Steve Khan) 7:16

== Personnel ==
- Leroy Hutson - Lead Vocals, Clavinet, Synthesizer (Arp), Piano (Bass)
- Craig McMullen, Phil Upchurch, Stephan Harris - Guitar
- Donnell Hagan - Drums, Percussion, Backing Vocals
- Benny Scott, Richard Evans - Bass
- Alfonso Surrett - Backing Vocals, Keyboards
- Aaron Jamal, Michael Hawkins - Keyboards
- Cordell Carter - Drums
- Tony Carpenter- Congas
- Bill McFarland - Trombone
- Michael Harris, Steve Hawkins - Trumpet
- Jerry Wilson - Alto Saxophone, Tenor Saxophone
- Arnold Blair, Eulaulah Hathaway, Janice Hutson, Joe D. Reaves, Kitty Heywood Singers - Backing Vocals
- Richard Fegley - photography

== Charts ==
Year	Album	Chart positions	
Year	Album	US	US R&B
1976	Feel The Spirit	170	21

=== Singles ===
Year	Single	Chart positions		
Year	Single	US	US R&B	US Dance
1976	"Feel the Spirit (In '76)"	—	25	5
1976	"Lover's Holiday"	—	66	—
