= Don't Come Crying to Me =

Single by Linda Clifford

from the album I'll Keep on Loving You
- B-side: "I'll Keep on Loving You"
- Released: 1982
- Genre: Pop, post-disco
- Length: 3:30 (7" version); 6:38 (12" version); 6:00 (Album version)
- Label: Capitol
- Songwriter(s): Michael Gore, Dean Pitchford
- Producer(s): Michael Gore

Linda Clifford singles chronology
"Let It Ride" (1982)	"Don't Come Crying to Me" (1982)	"A Night with the Boys" (1984)

"Don't Come Crying to Me" is a song written by Michael Gore and Dean Pitchford and performed by Linda Clifford. It was released in 1982 as a single from the album I'll Keep on Loving You. Along with the track "Let It Ride", "Don't Come Crying to Me" spent three weeks at number one on the US Dance chart. The track would be Clifford's final number one on the dance charts, and unlike her previous entries to the top spot, "Don't Come Crying to Me" did not cross over to any other chart.
