= Short Eyes (album) =

Soundtrack album by Curtis Mayfield
- Released: 1977
- Genres: Funk, soul
- Length: 35:17
- Label: Curtom
- Producer: Curtis Mayfield

Curtis Mayfield chronology
A Piece of the Action (with Mavis Staples) (1977)	Short Eyes (1977)	Never Say You Can't Survive (1977)

Short Eyes is a studio album released under Curtom Records and the soundtrack to Robert M. Young's 1977 film based upon the play of the same name by Miguel Piñero. The album contains one of Mayfield's last funk hits, "Do Do Wap is Strong in Here".

== Track listing ==
1. “Do Do Wap is Strong in Here” - 5:28
2. “Back Against the Wall” - 6:34
3. “Need Someone to Love” - 3:11
4. “A Heavy Dude” - 4:07
5. “Short Eyes/Freak, Freak, Free, Free, Free” - 5:40
6. “Break It Down” (H.P. Denenberg, Martin Hirch) - 4:17
7. “Another Fool in Love” - 3:20
8. “Father Confessor" (Instrumental) - 2:40

== Personnel ==
- Curtis Mayfield - vocals, lead guitar
- Gary Thompson - rhythm guitar
- Floyd Morris - keyboards
- Rich Tufo - keyboards, arranger
- Henry Gibson - bongos, congas
- Joseph Scott - bass
- Donnell Hagan - drums
- LeRoy Hutson, Alfonso Surrett, Ricki Linton, and Mystique - background vocals

Inner sleeve of album.

== Later samples ==
- "Short Eyes"
  - "Turn It Up" by Ashanti featuring Ja Rule from the album Concrete Rose (2004).
  - "American Gangster" by Jay-Z from the album American Gangster (2007)
  - "Brown Eyes" by Paris from the album Pistol Politics (2015)
- "Do Do Wap Is Strong in Here"
  - "Real Hip Hop" by Jadakiss featuring Sheek Louch from Kiss of Death (2004)
