= Bob Manning (soul singer) =

- Born: June 1945 (age 80)
- Origin: United States
- Genres: Soul
- Occupation: Singer

Bob Manning (born June 1945) is a vocalist now living in Minnesota, United States.

Bob began singing gospel music as a child in Virginia, U.S., and followed a stage career to New York City where he worked with among others: Gladys Knight, James Brown, Bo Diddley, Dick Clark, The Coasters and later The Four Tops.

Living in Stockholm, Sweden from 1983 to 1998, Bob had a number of bands and worked with top-notch Swedish artists such as Ann-Christine Hedmark, Roger Pontare and Coste Apetrea; and was responsible for the first single recording of "Soul Sister" with Zemya Hamilton (Sonet Recording Studio).

From 1991 to 1998, he worked mainly with The Soul Enterprise, and toured throughout Scandinavia, appearing at venues such as Fasching, Stampen, the Stockholm Jazz & Blues Festival, the Stockholm Water Festival, etc., and opened for or shared the stage with Soul giants such as Isaac Hayes, Al Green and Wilson Pickett.

== Discography ==
- Dance Beat, Shine On You, EMI Dancebeat Records, 1996
- Scrappy G, Mobbin Trow da City, MCA Music Entertainment, 1996
- André De Lange, A Friend, BIEM/NCB/GEMA, 1996
- Jazz On The Corner, Various Artists, Arietta Disks Musikprod. AB, 1995
- Chicago Express, Permanently Blue, Amigo Musik, 1995
- Totally Wired, Sweden, Soul Sister, Acid Jazz, 1994
- Blue Connection, Live at Clipper Club, Dragon Records Sweden, 1993
- All That Blues, From Sweden, Jefferson Rec, 1993
- En Blå Timme, That's Entertainment, TER Records 1993
