= Magnus Lindgren =

Swedish jazz musician (born 1974)

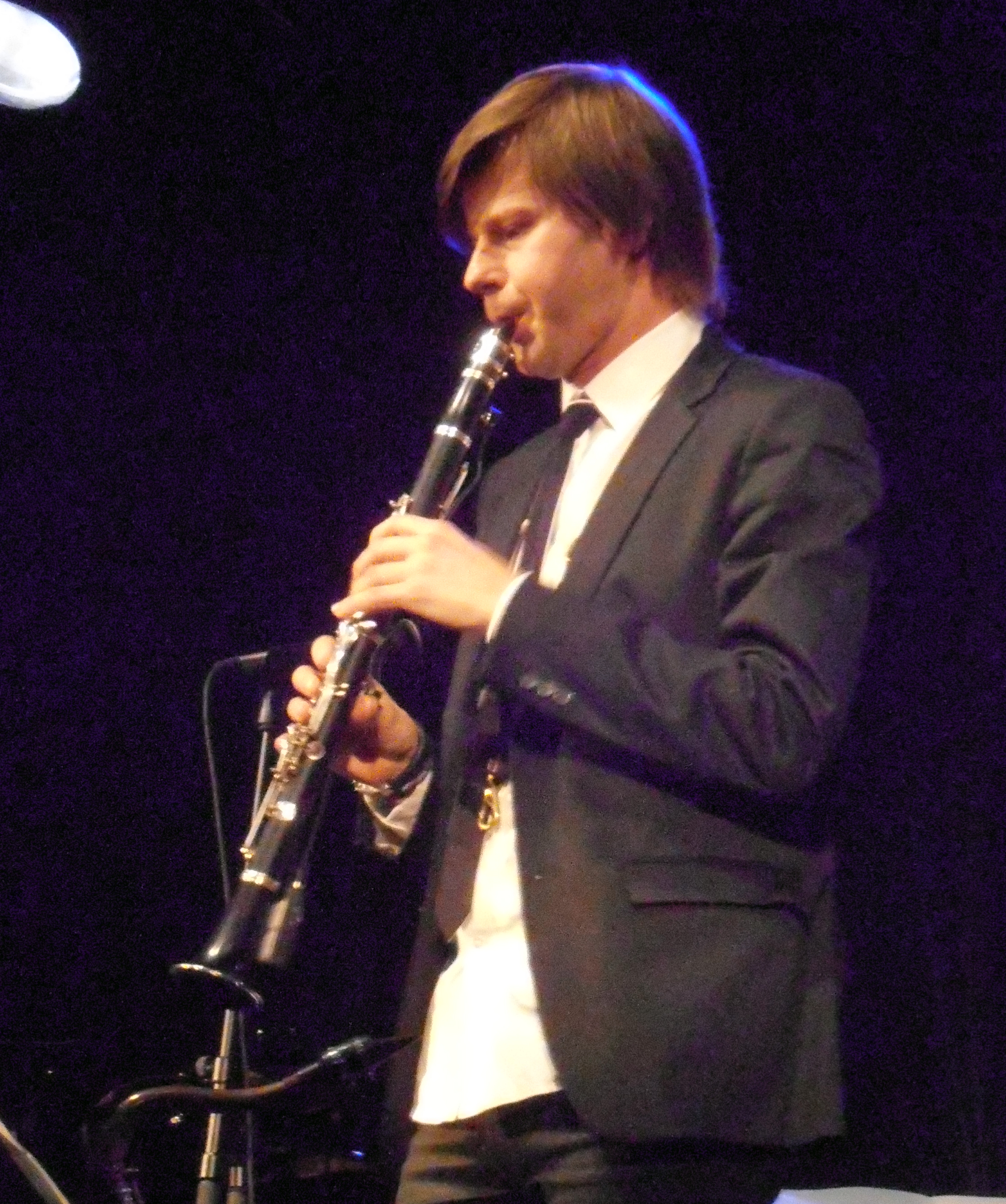

Background information
- Born: 13 August 1974 (age 52); Västerås, Sweden
- Genre: Jazz
- Occupations: Musician, composer, arranger
- Instruments: Saxophone, flute, clarinet
- Years active: 1993–present
- Website: magnuslindgren.com

Magnus Lindgren (born 13 August 1974 in Västerås, Sweden) is a Swedish jazz musician. He studied at the Västerås Music College. He then attended the Royal Swedish Academy of Music in Stockholm, Sweden, and began working with the Soul Enterprise. He began playing with Herbie Hancock aged 18, and formed his quartet in 1997. He has also worked with James Ingram, Koop, Barbara Hendricks, Gregory Porter, Till Brönner, Nicola Conte, Marie Fredriksson, Ivan Lins and David Foster. In 2001, Lindgren was voted the best Swedish jazz artist of the year by the Fasching jazz club in Stockholm. He has received a number of awards, including a Grammis award in 2001, and the Arne Domnérus Prize.

Lindgren's main instruments are the saxophone, clarinet and flute, and he also works as a composer and arranger. He was commissioned to write music for the Nobel Banquet in 2003, and in 2016 he performed at the Nobel banquet together with Martin Fröst, the Swedish Chamber Orchestra and the Adolf Fredriks Girls Choir.

== Biography ==
Magnus Lindgren was born in 1974 in Västerås, Sweden, and began to play guitar and sing in 1982. He has played the saxophone since the age of 13, in 1987. The following year, he began to play as a substitute in his father's band, on the saxophone, drums, guitar and bass. When he was 17, he was accepted to the Royal College of Music in Stockholm.

== Career ==
As a young musician, Lindgren performed with Herbie Hancock in 1993; he joined the Stockholm Jazz Orchestra in 1995, where he played with Bob Mintzer, Maria Schneider, and Jim McNeely. He started a jazz septet in 1994, and a quartet in 1997.

As he developed his career, he expanded his sphere of influence beyond Sweden. He played at Carnegie Hall in New York City in 2000. He also began a collaboration with opera singer Barbara Hendricks in 2002, and worked with James Ingram in Los Angeles in 2004. He performed at the Montreux jazz festival with his quartet in 2006. In 2009, he traveled to Rio de Janeiro, Brasil, to record with Brazilian musicians, and later performed with Brazilian composer and singer Ivan Lins.

Lindgren and his band, "Batucada Jazz," toured the world in 2010. He released an album, also titled Batucada Jazz, in the spring of 2009. It features Kiko Continentino on piano, Leonardo Amuedo on guitar, Armando Marcal and Pirulito on percussion with a guest spot by Nils Landgren. The album was nominated for a Grammis.

Lindgren has collaborated with Nils Landgren several times. During the spring of 2012 the two performed nine concerts together with Bohuslän Big Band and the Wermland Opera Orchestra in the project “Folk Notes, Tunes and Jazz”, for which Lindgren arranged the music, conducted both orchestras, and performed as a soloist. Lindgren also arranged music to the Berliner Philharmoniker and their celebration of the Chamber Music Hall, in October 2012.

Magnus Lindgrens' album Fyra was released in September 2012 and nominated for a Grammis. His next album, Souls, was released in 2013, with guest performances by Gregory Porter, Rigmor Gustafsson, Marie Fredriksson, and Mark Reilly.

== Awards and honours ==
Lindgren received the "Jazz In Sweden" award in 1999. He was nominated for a Grammis award in 2000, and in 2001 he won the Grammis for his big band album "Paradise Open." That year, he also won the Golden Disc for best jazz album of the year, and the Swedish Radio poll for best jazz album of the year. In 2003, he was chosen to compose music for and perform at the Nobel Prize Banquet. He worked with Nils Landgren once more and Quincy Jones.

In 2015, Lindgren was elected a member of the Royal Swedish Academy of Music. In 2016, he received the Litteris et Artibus medal.

== Discography ==
=== Albums ===
- 2013: Souls
- 2012: Fyra
- 2009: Batucada Jazz
- 2007: Brasil Big Bom
- 2005: Music for the Neighbours
- 2003: The Game
- 2001: Paradise Open
- 2000: Getxo Jazz
- 1999: Way Out
- 1998 Unexpected call from the Duke
