= Short Eyes (play) =

Play written by Miguel Piñero

- Written by: Miguel Piñero
- Original language: English
- Subject: Convicts in a prison
- Genre: Drama
- Setting: A dayroom in a detention centre

Premiere
- Date premiered: February 28, 1974
- Place premiered: Joseph Papp Public Theater; New York City

Short Eyes is a 1974 drama written by playwright Miguel Piñero. The play premiered at the Theater of the Riverside Church, was then produced off-Broadway at the Joseph Papp Public Theater on February 28, 1974, and transferred after 54 performances to the Vivian Beaumont Theater on Broadway on May 23, 1974. Short Eyes, prison slang for a child molester, was written for a prisoners' writing workshop during Piñero's incarceration for armed robbery.

== Characters ==
- Clark Davis: a middle-class white man in his mid-twenties accused of raping a young girl. While it is never explicitly stated whether he committed the crime he is accused of, it is made clear that he is a pedophile who has molested several other children.
- Juan Otero: A Puerto Rican man in his early thirties. He is liked and respected by his fellow prisoners and the guards alike.
- Cupcakes: A Puerto Rican "pretty boy" of 21 who is coveted by many of the House's convicts.
- Paco: A Puerto Rican drug addict with predatory designs on Cupcakes.
- Longshoe: A tough, hip Irishman in his mid-thirties, and the only white prisoner whom the black and Hispanic prisoners respect. He despises Davis.
- Ice: A tough, angry African-American man in his late twenties.
- El Raheem: A Black Muslim who preaches the word of Allah to his fellow prisoners.
- Omar: An African-American amateur boxer in his mid-twenties.
- Mr. Nett: An old-line prison guard who takes an immediate dislike to Davis.
- Captain Allard: Nett's superior officer. Imposing and macho, he has little patience for the prisoners.

== Plot summary ==
The play is set in an unnamed House of Detention in New York City, the inmates of which are predominantly black or Latino. One day, a new prisoner is brought in: Clark Davis, a young, middle-class white man accused of raping a young girl. His fellow prisoners immediately turn on him — child molesters are considered the lowest form of prison life — except for Juan, one of the institution's older prisoners, who treats him with dignity. While Davis insists he doesn't remember raping the girl, he admits that he has molested several other children.

It is eventually revealed that the police's case against Davis is weak, and he will likely be released. This puts Juan in a difficult position: on one hand, he feels a grudging pity for Davis, and "snitching" on another prisoner, even one as despised as Davis, could get him killed; on the other, there is no doubt in his mind that Davis will "scar up some more little girls' minds" if released. Before he can decide what to do, however, Davis is attacked and killed by the other prisoners.

The play also revolves around other features of prison life, such as the day-to-day attempts to accumulate privileges from the guards and "rap sessions" in which prisoners joke, flirt, and threaten each other.

== Reception ==
In 1974, the play was presented at Riverside Church in Manhattan. Theater impresario Joseph Papp saw the play and was so impressed that he moved the production to Broadway. The play was nominated for six Tony Awards. It won the New York Critics Circle Award and an Obie Award for the "best play of the year". The play was also a success in Europe, and catapulted Piñero to literary fame. Short Eyes was revived to acclaim by The Zoo Theatre Company, at The American Theater for Actors in 1988. It was Directed by Dusko Petkovich. Short Eyes was published in book form by the editorial house Hill & Yang.

Walter Kerr of The New York Times said the play was "promising" but "not yet freed from its initial debt to life."

== Film adaptation ==
In 1977, the play was adapted for a film, directed by Robert M. Young from a script by Piñero.

The film starred Bruce Davison as Davis, Piñero as Go-Go and Luis Guzmán. Curtis Mayfield appeared in the film and composed and performed the soundtrack.

== Awards and nominations ==
Awards

- 1974 New York Drama Critics' Circle Award for Best American Play
- 1974 Obie Award Best American Play

Nominations

- 1975 Tony Award for Best Play
