= The Natural Four =

American r&b group

- Origin: Oakland, California, U.S.
- Genres: Rhythm and blues, soul, funk, doo-wop, rock and roll
- Years active: 1967–1976
- Labels: Boola Boola, Chess Records, ABC Records, Curtom, Sequel
- Past members: Al Bowden; Chris James; Allen Richardson; Darryl Cannady; Delmos Whitley; John January; Steve Striplin

The Natural Four was an American R&B group from Oakland, California that played from 1967 to 1976.

== History ==
Formed in 1967, the Natural Four approached Fred Ivey about becoming their manager. Ivey owned a local record store called Tape Town and eventually made a deal with a local Oakland label, Boola Boola Records. Their first release, "I Thought You Were Mine" sold 30,000 copies locally, after being regularly played on San Francisco soul/R&B radio station KSOL and on Oakland's KDIA where it rose to #7 on the chart.

ABC Records saw the group's potential and picked them up. Their second release on Boola Boola, "Why Should We Stop Now" was re-released and, ABC then released "The Same Thing in Mind", a remake of their first hit "I Thought You Were Mine", and a cover of The Temptations' "Message From a Black Man", but none repeated the success of their initial recording.

Chess Records released the single, "Give a Little Love" in 1971 without success and, following this, Chris James replaced the rest of the band. The new group, with Delmos Whitley generally taking lead, signed with Curtis Mayfield's label, Curtom Records, in 1972 and proceeded to release a string of US R&B hits, including one Top 40 breakthrough, 1973's "Can This Be Real". Their three Curtom LPs were mainly produced by Leroy Hutson, formerly of The Impressions, but after their third album failed to chart, the group called it quits.

The Curtom releases were re-issued in 1999 as a two-CD package by Sequel.

== Members ==
1967–1972

- Chris James
- Allen Richardson
- John January
- Al Bowden

1972–1976

- Chris James
- Darryl Cannady
- Steve Striplin
- Delmos Whitley

== Discography ==
- Good Vibes (ABC Records, 1970)
- The Natural Four (Curtom Records, 1974) US Black Albums #36
- Heaven Right Here On Earth (Curtom, 1974) US #182, US Black Albums #49
- Nightchaser (Curtom, 1976)
- Can This Be Real? (re-release of the three Curtom LPs on 2 CD, Sequel Records, 1999)

== Singles ==
Year	Title	Chart Positions	
Year	Title	US Pop Singles	US Black Singles
1969	"Why Should We Stop Now"	-	31
1971	"Hanging on to a Lie"		
1974	"Can This Be Real"	31	10
1974	"Love That Really Counts"	98	23
1974	"You Bring Out the Best in Me"	-	20
1975	"Heaven Right Here on Earth"	-	68
1975	"Love's So Wonderful"	-	87
1976	"Free"	-	71
1976	"It's the Music"	-	82
