= Mighty Panther =

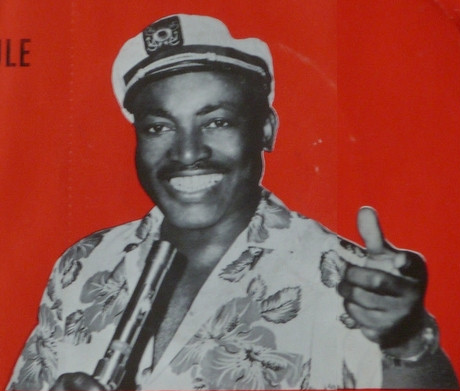

Background information
- Also known as: Mighty Panta
- Born: Vernon Joseph Roberts; 24 November 1921; Trinidad
- Died: 29 July 2002 (aged 80) The Bronx, New York City, United States
- Genres: Calypso
- Occupations: Singer, songwriter

Vernon Joseph Roberts (24 November 1921 – 29 July 2002), known as Mighty Panther or Mighty Panta, was a Trinidadian calypsonian, based in the United States for much of his career.

Born in Trinidad, he began recording in Trinidad in the early 1950s. In 1956, he was one of six calypso singers chosen to perform at the Governor's House for Princess Margaret.

He left the island around 1958 for the United States, and performed there in clubs in Chicago, Fort Lauderdale, Lake Tahoe, Las Vegas, and San Diego, where he also made television appearances. He settled in Hollywood in 1962, continuing to make club appearances in Los Angeles and San Diego, and in 1966 recorded the album Songs of Dynamite issued on the Drum Boy label, a subsidiary of Jay Jay Records. He opened his own club in San Diego in 1967, with a show called "The Mighty Panther and the Jungle Cats" featuring other calypsonians and limbo dancers, but it was not successful and closed the following year.

He then sang regularly on cruise ships, returning to Trinidad in 1969 to sing at the Original Young Brigade Tent. After returning to the United States he lived in New York City, where he became active in the West Indian community and involved in social work. He also recorded the album Mighty Panta's Going to the Moon, released in 1971. He was several times the master of ceremonies at the annual Labor Day Carnival in Brooklyn, and in March 2001 joined with fellow calypso performer King Wellington to perform at the People's Poetry Gathering in Greenwich Village.

He died in The Bronx in 2002, aged 80.
