= Hutson II =

Studio album by Leroy Hutson
- Released: November 1976
- Recorded: 1976 at Curtom Studios, Chicago, Illinois
- Genre: Funk/Soul; Chicago soul/R&B
- Length: 30:58
- Label: Curtom
- Producer: Leroy Hutson

Leroy Hutson chronology
Feel The Spirit (1976)	Hutson II (1976)	Closer To The Source (1978)

Professional ratings
Review scores
Source	Rating
Allmusic	3/5 stars

Hutson II is the fifth solo album by Leroy Hutson. It was released November 1976 on Curtom Records. This album bookended Hutson's trilogy of classic albums he released between 1975 and 1977. It is considered to be one of his greatest albums.

== Track listing ==
All tracks composed by Leroy Hutson

1. "Love The Feeling" 3:53
2. "Situations" (Instrumental) 1:09
3. "I Do, I Do (Want To Make Love To You)" 3:57
4. "I Think I'm Falling In Love" 3:28
5. "Love To Hold You Close" 3:10
6. "Flying High" 3:49
7. "Blackberry Jam" 4:50
8. "Sofunkstication" 4:45
9. "Don't It Make You Feel Good" 3:04

== Personnel ==
- Leroy Hutson - Lead Vocals, Clavinet, Keyboards, Ensemble, Strings, Synthesizer, Piano, Arrangements
- Joel Brandon - Flute, Whistle
- Fred Bredberg - Engineer
- Mattie Butler, Brenda Ford, Denise Herd, Joe D. Reaves, Valerie Sams, Alfonso Surrett - Background Vocals
- Reggie Gillerson, Benny "Porky" Scott - Bass Guitar
- Stephen Harris, Phil Upchurch - Guitar
- Aaron Jamal, Margie Stroud, James L. Hersen - keyboards
- Tony Carpenter - Bongos
- Cordell Carter, Donzell Davis, Donnell Hagan - Drums
- Master Henry Gibson - Congas
- Bill McFarland - Trombone
- Michael Harris - Trumpet
- Stephen Harris, Rich Tufo - Composers
- Jerry Wilson - Tenor Saxophone
- James Mack, Rich Tufo - string and horn arrangements

== Charts ==
Year	Album	Chart positions	
Year	Album	US	US R&B
1976	Hutson II	-	46

=== Singles ===
Year	Single	Chart positions		
Year	Single	US	US R&B	US Dance
1977	"I Do, I Do (Want To Make Love To You)"	—	55	—
1977	"Blackberry Jam"	—	82	—
