= Khaled Habib =

Algerian musical artist

Khaled Habib El Kebich
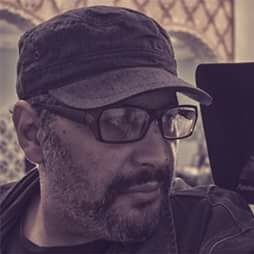

Background information
- Also known as: Khaled Habib
- Born: Khaled Habib El Kebich; 24 January 1970 (age 56); Tiaret, Algeria
- Genres: World Music, Algerian Music, Rock, Jazz, Blues
- Occupations: Film Director, Singer, Songwriter, Composer, Actor
- Instruments: Guitar, Bass, Piano
- Years active: 1990-present
- Website: Sultan Music

Khaled Habib El-Kebich (born 24 January 1970 in Tiaret, Algeria) is an Algerian film director, composer, singer-songwriter and actor.

== Musical Style ==
He composes and performs a genre of music which is both traditional and modern. He has developed a personal musical mix in which he blends different musical styles as well as music from all over the world. His music could be described as having influences of funk, jazz, reggae, blues, soul, Latin rhythms as well as folk music from various corners of the world. The same applies to the mix of instruments with everything ranging from traditional drums to electronic sounds-capes.

== Career ==
Khaled El Kebich artistic field extends into the domains of composing music for films and theatre plays, such as La Celestina set up at the Royal Dramatic Theatre under the direction of Robert Lepage (1998), and the film Nattbok by Carl Henrik Svenstedt, "Vingar av glas" and "Cappricciosa" directed by Reza Bagher,"Huvudrollen" by Leyla Assaf-Tangroth. Foursan Al Hoggar directed by Kamal Laham produced by Samira Hadjdjilani/EPTV Algerian Television and the feature film "El Hanachia" by Boualem Aissaoui produced by CADC (Centre Algerian du development du cinema).

From wild brash orchestral sounds to subliminal moody underscore and shimmering textures, Khaled El Kebich film-music and scoring is contemporary with emotional sounds-capes that enhance a film work whilst adhering to a consistent musical personality.

The fact that his style has its roots in Algerian music mixed with a variety of different musical directions partly because he has written and performed with a number of bands of different ethnic background, such as Down By Law from Italy, New Phases from South Africa, Aquarius from France, Hada Raïna from Sweden, and others.

He has also participated at major European festivals such as: Falun Folkmusik Festival, Roskilde Festival, ArtGenda Festival, Stockholm Water Festival, Re:Orient Festival, Folk o Folk Festival, Verlden i Norden Festival, 550 Fatih Istanbul Festival and many others.

== Discography ==
- Slaves of Freedom, ( Hada Raina) 1998
- Celestina, 2000
- Khaled Habib Live, 2003
- The painted voice, Film-music 2004
- Nostalgia, 2004
- La Casbah De Brel ( Live) 2006
- Ultima Jam, 2007

== Filmography ==
- Knights of the Fantasia (2017)Documentary film
- The Rug (2018)Art-movie
