= Leroy Hutson =

American soul and R&B singer (born 1945)

- Born: June 4, 1945 (age 81); Newark, New Jersey, U.S.
- Genres: Funk, R&B, soul, Chicago soul, smooth soul, jazz
- Occupations: Songwriter, musician, arranger, producer
- Instruments: Vocals, piano, keyboards, clavinet, saxophone
- Years active: 1970s–1990s
- Labels: Curtom; Warner Bros. Elektra; Triumph, Kapp; Acid Jazz Records
- Website: Official website

Leroy Hutson (born June 4, 1945) is an American soul and R&B singer, songwriter, arranger, producer and instrumentalist, best known as former lead singer of R&B vocal group The Impressions.

His music concerns 1970s soul, as noted in the June 29, 2006 issue of Rolling Stone magazine. He is the father of producer JR Hutson.

== Biography ==
=== Early years ===
As a teenager, Hutson formed the Nu-Tones, a four-man vocal group based in New Jersey. They won several talent shows during his high school years. The other members of the Nu-Tones were Ronald King, Bernard Ransom, Ed Davis, and Irving Jenkins.

In 1968, as part of the duo Sugar & Spice, Lee Hutson and Deborah Rollins recorded for Kapp Records. They recorded several singles with some success. Their single "In Love Forever" ranked the "Best New Record Of The Week" in the local newspaper column "Soul Sauce". Two other singles recorded were "Ah Ha Yeah" and "Dreams".

=== College years ===
Initially attending Howard University in Washington D.C. to study dentistry, Hutson was room-mates with Donny Hathaway who left college early in order to be Curtis Mayfield's musical director, Hutson then chose to switch his college major to music theory and composition. It is through Hathaway that Hutson then came to replace Curtis in The Impressions.

At Howard University, Hutson joined The Mayfield Singers, a group put together on Howard's campus by musician Curtis Mayfield that performed at New York's famed Apollo Theater and Philadelphia's Uptown Theater. The group released one single for Mayfield in 1967.

There, Hutson collaborated with Donny Hathaway on "The Ghetto", giving the late recording star his first hit record in early 1970.

=== Years with the Impressions ===
In 1971, three months out of college, Hutson was asked to replace Curtis Mayfield as the lead singer of The Impressions. He stayed with them for two-and-a-half years and recorded two albums with the group, before amicably leaving to pursue his own career as a writer, producer, arranger, and musician.

The first Impressions single to feature Hutson as lead vocalist was entitled "Love Me", released on Curtom Records in North America in June 1971.

On August 27, 2013, Hutson, filed a complaint against Young Jeezy and others alleging that Young Jeezy's song "Time" inappropriately incorporated the instrumental portion of The Impressions "Getting it On," which was registered with the United States Copyright Office in 1973.

=== Solo career ===
In 1973 Hutson wrote, produced, arranged and recorded his first solo album, Love Oh Love, featuring the single "So In Love With You". It was released on Curtom Records.

Between the period of 1973 until 1992 Hutson recorded eight albums and charted with thirteen singles in the U.S. Because of this he has developed a cult following on the soul scene. After Love Oh Love, Hutson went on to release The Man!, Hutson, Feel the Spirit, Hutson II, Closer to the Source and Unforgettable. Hutson's last 12", the Share Your Love EP, was released via the UK's Expansion Records.

In 2008, Hutson returned to recording under the name Lee Hutson, issuing an album Soothe You Groove You on his own Triumph label and via download. Two years later, in August 2010, Hutson made his comeback to European stages, performing at Suncebeat Festival in Zadar, Croatia, at Vintage at Goodwood Festival and at Indigo2 in London. He was backed by the British group The Third Degree.

In 2017, Hutson entered a five year licensing agreement for his work to be managed by British independent record label Acid Jazz Records, who released an Anthology LP featuring his bigger hits such as "I Think I'm Falling In Love", "Lucky Fellow" and "Don't It Make You Feel Good" as well as previously unreleased track "Positive Forces", which featured an instrumental of "All Because of You" on the B side. They then went on to release another unreleased single, "Now That I Found You".

In February 2018 they re-issued both Hutson and Hutson II and are currently in the process of releasing a four-part online documentary entitled Leroy Hutson: The Man!, which features contributions from long-time fans of Hutson's such as actor and radio DJ Craig Charles and Acid Jazz founder and managing director Eddie Piller. Piller is said to have based his own music production style on that of Hutson's, and uses the instrumental track "Cool Out" as the opening track for his current radio show, Eddie Piller's Eclectic Soul Show.

As of June 2025 Hutson's work is licensed with British independent record label, Home of The Good Groove Records, owned by Rod Bartlett. Included in the full catalogue are several previously unreleased recordings that were "misplaced" in the vaults and rediscovered in 2020. Many of these previously unreleased recordings, are featured on 7-inch vinyl records as part of the "Hutson Sevens" series.

=== Work with other artists ===
Consistently touring through the late 1970s and 1980s, Hutson also lent his musicality to production work with fellow Curtom artists Linda Clifford, Arnold Blair, and The Natural Four.

As a writer/producer, he has worked for Roberta Flack ("Tryin' Times", "Gone Away"), The Natural Four ("You Bring Out the Best in Me", "Can This Be Real"), Linda Clifford, Voices of East Harlem ("Giving Love"), Arnold Blair ("Trying to Get Next to You"), and Next Movement ("Let's Work It Out"), while more recently one of his own cult singles "Lucky Fellow" was covered by Snowboy on Acid Jazz records.

== Television ==
- The Midnight Special (Episode 20 aired 8 June 1973) - LeRoy Hutson performed "Love Oh Love", guest hosted by Curtis Mayfield
- Soul Train (Episode 32 aired 18 May 1974) – The Spinners / The Independents / LeRoy Hutson
- Soul Train (Episode 37 aired 7 June 1975) – Curtis Mayfield / LeRoy Hutson / Natural Four

== Discography ==
=== Albums ===
- Love Oh Love (1973)
- The Man! (Spring 1974)
- Hutson (July 1975)
- Feel the Spirit (February 1976)
- Hutson II (November 1976)
- Closer to the Source (February 1978)
- Unforgettable (October 1979)
- Paradise (1982)
- Soothe You Groove You (2009)

=== Compilations ===
- There's More Where This Came From (1992)
- The Very Best of LeRoy Hutson (02/25/1997)
- The Best of LeRoy Hutson (UK) (1997)
- More Where That Came From: The Best of LeRoy Hutson, Vol. 2 (03/10/1998)
- Lucky Fellow: The Curtom Anthology 1972-79 (11/14/2000)
- The Best of LeRoy Hutson, Volume 1 (2006)
- Anthology 1972 - 1984 (2017)

== Chart history – LeRoy Hutson ==
Billboard Music Charts (North America) - singles

Year	Single	Chart	Chart position
1973	"Love Oh Love"	Black Singles	75
1973	"When You Smile"	Black Singles	81
1974	"Ella Weez"	Black Singles	81
1975	"All Because of You"	Black Singles	31
1975	"Can't Stay Away"	Black Singles	66
1976	"Feel the Spirit"	Disco Singles	5
1976	"Feel the Spirit"	Black Singles	25
1976	"Lover's Holiday"	Black Singles	68
1977	"Blackberry Jam"	Black Singles	82
1977	"I Do, I Do (Want to Make Love to You)"	Black Singles	55
1978	"In the Mood"	Black Singles	56
1978	"Where Did Love Go"	Black Singles	45
1979	"Right or Wrong"	Black Singles	47

Billboard Music Charts (North America) - album

Year	Album	Chart	Chart position
1974	The Man!	Black Albums	36
1975	Hutson	Black Albums	46
1976	Feel the Spirit	Black Albums	21
1976	Feel the Spirit	Pop Albums	170
1977	Hutson II	Black Albums	26
1979	Unforgettable	Black Albums	69

== Chart history – The Natural Four ==
- "Can This Be Real" (b/w "Try Love Again") (#10 R&B, #31 Pop, late 1973)
- "Love That Really Counts" (#23 R&B, #98 Pop, Spring 1974)
- "You Bring Out the Best in Me" (#20 R&B, Summer 1974)
