= RSO Records =

American record label

- Founded: 1973
- Founder: Robert Stigwood; Al Coury
- Defunct: 1983
- Status: Absorbed into Polydor
- Distributors: Universal Music Group (Capitol for the Bee Gees; Polydor for all other artists; Island as US distributor of non-Bee Gees reissues)
- Genre: Various
- Country of origin: United Kingdom
- Location: London, England

RSO Records was a record label formed by rock and roll and musical theatre impresario Robert Stigwood and record executive Al Coury in 1973. The letters "RSO" stood for the Robert Stigwood Organisation.

RSO managed the careers of several major acts, the Bee Gees, Yvonne Elliman, Cream, Eric Clapton, and Andy Gibb. The release of the soundtracks of Saturday Night Fever (over 50 million copies sold worldwide) and Grease (over 30 million copies sold worldwide), which were two of the best selling albums ever, made RSO one of the most financially successful labels of the 1970s. Additionally, the record label released the soundtracks to Fame, Sparkle, Meatballs, The Empire Strikes Back, Return of the Jedi, Times Square and Grease 2.

At one point in 1978, the label boasted an unprecedented six consecutive number-one singles on the Billboard (US) pop charts, holding the top spot for 21 consecutive weeks. With singles releases from the Grease soundtrack album ("You're the One That I Want", and the title track) and another Andy Gibb hit ("Shadow Dancing"), RSO logged a further 10 weeks at the number 1 position, giving the label a record nine in one calendar year. This feat remains unduplicated by any record label to date.

The company's main headquarters were at 67 Brook Street, in London's Mayfair. RSO Records underwent four distribution stages: by Atlantic Records from March 1973 to December 1975, by Polydor Records from January 1976 to December 1977, as an independent label under the PolyGram Group umbrella from January 1978 to around October 1981, and finally by PolyGram Records from around November 1981 until the label's end in 1983.

As well as the label was operating in 1978, the disastrous commercial and critical failure of the Sgt. Pepper's Lonely Hearts Club Band soundtrack album crippled the company. The woes of this failure were somewhat offset by the middle of 1979, as the Bee Gees album Spirits Having Flown went on to eventually sell over 30 million copies (with the album producing three further number one singles that each sold more than one million copies in their own right).

In 1980, the label's most famous act, the Bee Gees, filed a $200 million lawsuit against both RSO and Stigwood, claiming mismanagement, which was met with Stigwood's own $310 million countersuit alleging libel, defamation of character and extortion. It is still considered to be the largest successful lawsuit against a record company by an artist or group. The lawsuit was subsequently settled for an undisclosed amount, and after a public reconciliation, the band remained with the label until its dissolution.

By 1981, Stigwood had ended his involvement with the label, which was absorbed into PolyGram a few years later. All previous RSO releases were later re-released under the Polydor label, which is now owned by Universal Music Group. Reissues from Polydor are distributed in the U.S. by sister label Island Records.

The Star Wars soundtracks passed through several hands before ending up with Sony Classical in the 1990s, and finally, Walt Disney Records after Disney's purchase of Lucasfilm Ltd. The Bee Gees catalog reverted to the Gibb family, who set up a new distribution arrangement with Warner Music's Reprise Records, which reissued their albums and the Saturday Night Fever soundtrack until 2016, when the Bee Gees signed a new deal with Universal's Capitol Records.

== Company logo ==
Stigwood explained the inspiration for RSO Records's akabeko logo in a 2001 interview for Billboard:

I was in Japan with The Who and decided to set up RSO as an independent label. I had designers working on a logo, but I didn't like any of them. Some Japanese friends gave me a papier-mâché cow, which is a symbol of good health and good fortune. It was on the mantelpiece in my office, and I thought, 'Good health and good fortune, that's appropriate. Just write RSO on it.'

In the 1978 movie Sgt. Pepper's Lonely Hearts Club Band, a similar logo of a pig, rather than a cow, was used as a logo of the fictional Big Deal Records label depicted in the film.

== Label variations ==
During its existence, the styling of the RSO circular label changed as it changed its distribution partner.

- Atlantic - distributed label: Peach label with small logo
- Polydor - distributed label: Tan label with large logo, Polydor logo at bottom perimeter of label
- Independently distributed label: Tan label with larger logo
- PolyGram - distributed label: Silver label with large logo
- RSO Top Line - reissue label: White label with gold or silver star, very small logo at top of label between TOP and LINE

== See also ==
- List of record labels
- RSO Records discography, list of albums released
