= Linda Clifford =

American singer (born 1948)

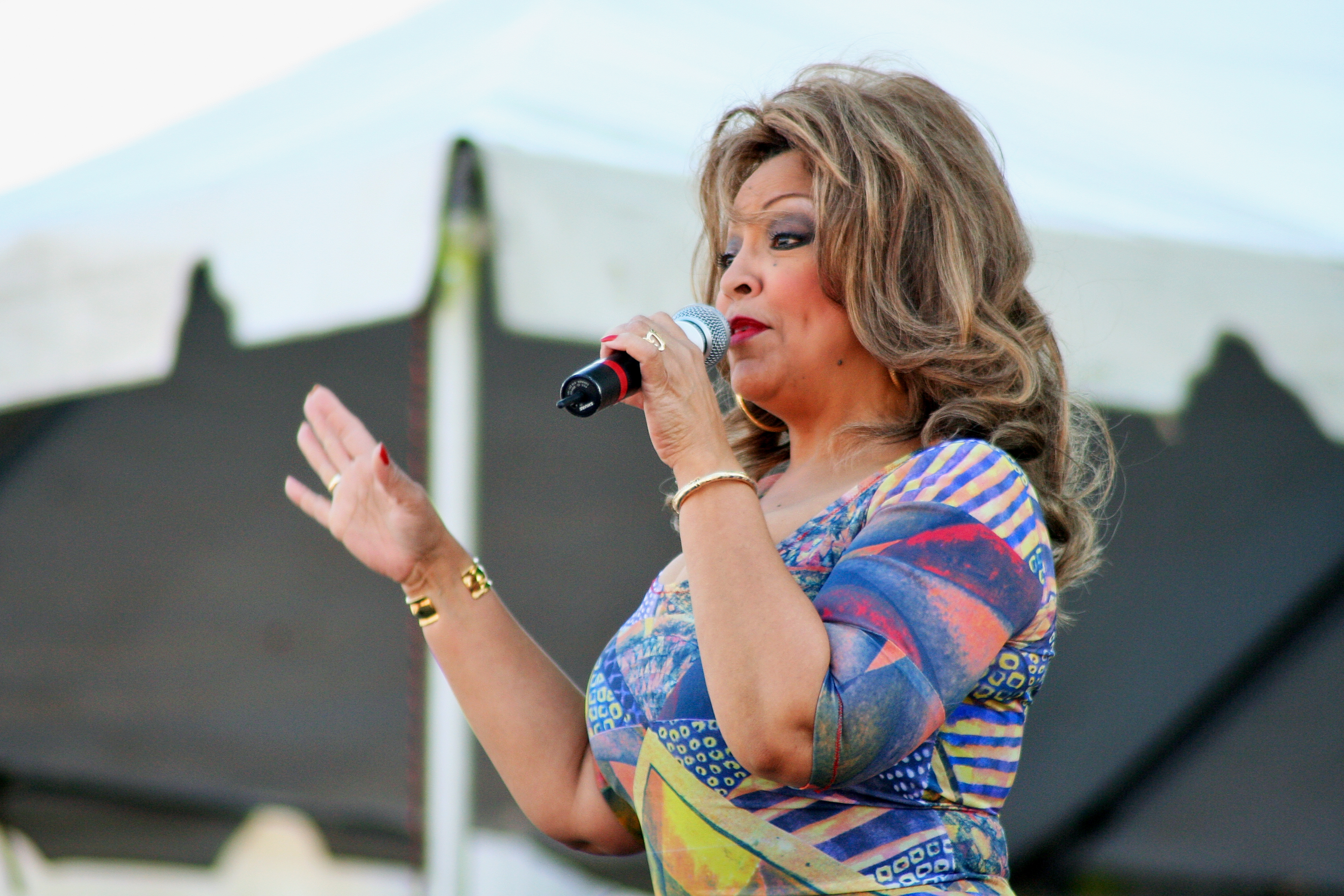
- Clifford in 2007

Background information
- Born: Linda Cumbo; June 14, 1948 (age 78); New York City, U.S.
- Genres: Disco; R&B; house
- Occupation: Singer
- Years active: 1972–present
- Labels: Paramount, Curtom, RSO, Capitol, Red Label
- Website: thelindaclifford.com

Linda Clifford (born June 14, 1948) is an American R&B, disco and house music singer who scored hits from the 1970s to the 1980s, most notably "If My Friends Could See Me Now", "Bridge over Troubled Water", "Runaway Love" and "Red Light".

== Career ==
Clifford is a former Miss New York State, and fronted a jazz music trio before switching to R&B. After winning her title, Clifford worked as an actress, playing minor roles in films such as The Boston Strangler with Tony Curtis and Henry Fonda, Coogan's Bluff with Clint Eastwood and Sweet Charity with Shirley MacLaine. Unsatisfied with her roles, Clifford decided to concentrate on her singing career, performing for a year in Miami-area night clubs with the Jericho Jazz Singers, before forming her own group Linda & the Trade Winds.

In 1973, she was signed to Paramount Records and her first single, "(It's Gonna Be) A Long Long Winter", was a minor hit on the U.S. Billboard R&B chart in the winter of 1974. She moved to Curtis Mayfield's Curtom Records label in the mid 1970s. In 1977, she released her first album, Linda, and in 1978, her dance cover of "If My Friends Could See Me Now" was a hit in clubs and on the Billboard Hot 100. It was her first number one on Billboard Dance chart. Her album of the same name became her most successful and included also "Runaway Love", a mid-tempo R&B track that proved to be one of her most recognizable tunes. In 1979, she released her disco version of "Bridge over Troubled Water" from the album Let Me Be Your Woman. Latter that year, she released another album: Here's My Love.

In 1980, she released a duet album with Curtis Mayfield, The Right Combination, and recorded a song "Red Light" for the Fame soundtrack in 1980. It peaked at number one on the American dance chart. "Shoot Your Best Shot" (1980) and "Don't Come Crying to Me" (1982) were the third and fourth of her four number one dance hits in the US. She released six albums while under contract on the Curtom label, all supervised by Curtis Mayfield, generally produced by Gil Askey (jazz trumpet player and musical director for many Motown acts) with many mixes by Jim Burgess or Jimmy Simpson, brother of Valerie Simpson from Ashford and Simpson. The sixth, I'm Yours, was produced by Isaac Hayes with the exception of "Red Light" (written by Pitchford and Gore). Curtom Records was distributed by Warner Bros. (1977–1978), by RSO (1979–1980) and by the end of 1980 by Capitol.

Her contract switched entirely to Capitol for her seventh album, I'll Keep on Loving You (1982). It included collaboration by Luther Vandross and the original version of "All the Man That I Need", another song written by Pitchford and Gore; they wrote this particular song with Clifford and her husband in mind. A year later it was covered by Sister Sledge, in 1990 by Whitney Houston and in 1994 by Luther Vandross, under the name "All the Woman That I Need". On his album Songs, Vandross even credited Houston for being the "artist who did the original version of the song", forgetting that it was originally Clifford's song and that he was a background vocalist and the vocal arranger of her version.

Her 1984 offering, Sneakin' Out did relatively well on the American R&B chart. Clifford's last studio album to date remains 1985's My Heart's on Fire, supported by the single "The Heat in Me". In 2001, she secured her fourth UK Singles Chart entry with "Ride the Storm", billed as Akabu featuring Linda Clifford. Her most recent single, "Baby I'm Yours", was released in 2011.

In 1982, she sang the opening theme to the NBC crime drama "Chicago Story".

In 2012, her minor hit from 1979, "I Just Wanna Wanna", resurfaced as the love theme in the Lee Daniels film, The Paperboy.

In 2015, Clifford collaborated with disco and house vocalists Martha Wash and Evelyn "Champagne" King on the download-only single "Show Some Love", which reached number #6 on the Billboard Dance chart the same year, and released on Martha Wash's own label Purple Rose Records. Their collaboration was credited as a group as First Ladies of Disco. A video was released to promote the single along with an alternate video featuring a remix by John LePage and Brian Cua.

== Discography ==
=== Studio albums ===
Year	Title	Peak chart positions				Record label
Year	Title	US	US R&B	AUS	CAN	Record label
1977	Linda	—	—	—	—	Curtom
1978	If My Friends Could See Me Now	22	9	86	28	Curtom
1979	Let Me Be Your Woman	26	19	90	39	Curtom/RSO
1979	Here's My Love	117	47	—	—	Curtom/RSO
1980	The Right Combination (with Curtis Mayfield)	180	53	—	—	Curtom/RSO
1980	I'm Yours	160	47	—	—	Curtom/RSO
1982	I'll Keep on Loving You	—	—	—	—	Capitol/EMI
1984	Sneakin' Out	—	49	—	—	Red Label
1985	My Heart's on Fire	—	—	—	—	Red Label
"—" denotes a recording that did not chart or was not released in that territory.

=== Compilation albums ===
- Greatest Hits (1989, Curtom)
- Runaway Love and Other Hits (1999, Rhino)
- Runaway Love: The Curtom Anthology (2000, Sequel)

=== Singles ===
Year	Single	Peak chart positions						Album
Year	Single	US	US R&B	US Dan	AUS	CAN	UK	Album
1972	"Love Is Not the Question"	—	—	—	—	—	—	Non-album single
1974	"(It's Gonna Be) A Long Long Winter"	—	75	—	—	—	—	Non-album single
1974	"After Loving You"	—	—	—	—	—	—	Non-album single
1974	"Turn the Key Softly"	—	—	—	—	—	—	Non-album single
1977	"From Now On"	—	94	28	—	—	—	Linda
1977	"You Can Do It"	—	—	28	—	—	—	Linda
1978	"Runaway Love"	76	3	1	—	61	95	If My Friends Could See Me Now
1978	"If My Friends Could See Me Now"	54	68	1	—	—	50	If My Friends Could See Me Now
1978	"Gypsy Lady"	—	—	1	—	—	—	If My Friends Could See Me Now
1979	"Bridge over Troubled Water"	41	49	11	86	70	28	Let Me Be Your Woman
1979	"Don't Give It Up"	—	15	11	—	—	—	Let Me Be Your Woman
1979	"Sweet Melodies"	—	—	11	—	—	—	Let Me Be Your Woman
1979	"Between You Baby and Me" (with Curtis Mayfield)	—	14	87	—	—	—	The Right Combination
1979	"I Just Wanna Wanna"	—	36	73	—	—	—	Here's My Love
1980	"Love's Sweet Sensation" (with Curtis Mayfield)	—	34	87	—	—	—	The Right Combination
1980	"Red Light"	41	40	1	—	—	—	I'm Yours
1980	"Shoot Your Best Shot"	—	43	1	—	—	—	I'm Yours
1980	"It Don't Hurt No More"	—	—	1	—	—	—	I'm Yours
1980	"I Had a Talk with My Man"	—	53	—	—	—	—	I'm Yours
1982	"Let It Ride"	—	—	1	—	—	—	I'll Keep on Loving You
1982	"Don't Come Crying to Me"	—	—	1	—	—	—	I'll Keep on Loving You
1984	"A Night with the Boys"	—	76	—	—	—	—	Sneakin' Out
1984	"Sneakin' Out"	—	62	—	—	—	—	Sneakin' Out
1985	"You're Mine"	—	—	—	—	—	—	Sneakin' Out
1985	"The Heat in Me"	—	—	17	—	—	—	My Heart's on Fire
1995	"Whatcha Gonna Do"	—	—	—	—	—	—	Non-album single
1999	"Wanna Give It Up" (with Ralphi Rosario)	—	—	16	—	—	—	Non-album single
2001	"Changin'"	—	—	17	—	—	—	Non-album single
2001	"Ride the Storm" (with Akabu)	—	—	—	—	—	69	Non-album single
2001	"Philly Groove" (with Romain & Danny Krivit)	—	—	29	—	—	—	Non-album single
2002	"Back to My Roots 2002"	—	—	—	—	—	85	Non-album single
2002	"Sunshine"	—	—	—	—	—	99	Non-album single
2003	"Spinnin" (with Prospect Park)	—	—	—	—	—	93	Non-album single
2008	"How Long"	—	—	—	—	—	—	Non-album single
2011	"Baby I'm Yours"	—	—	—	—	—	—	Non-album single
"—" denotes a recording that did not chart or was not released in that territory.

== See also ==
- List of number-one dance hits (United States)
- List of artists who reached number one on the US Dance chart
