= Gil Askey =

American jazz musician

Gilbert Askey (March 9, 1925 – April 9, 2014) was an American jazz trumpeter, composer, producer and musical director who was born in Austin, Texas, and emigrated to Australia in 1988.

== Early and personal life ==
Askey was born in Austin, Texas, on March 9, 1925. He is the son of Ada Simond, a Texan public health activist and historian. He left home at the age of 17. He completed two years of university on a medical scholarship.

In 1980, he married an Australian woman whom he had first met in 1973 and the couple moved to Melbourne, Australia in 1988.

== Career ==
Askey was considered to be "one of the architects of the legendary motown sound". Berry Gordy often called Askey "The glue that kept everything together".

Askey studied music at the Boston Conservatory of Music and the Harnett School of Music in New York.

He performed with jazz musicians including Dizzy Gillespie, Miles Davis, Duke Ellington and Count Basie, and even did a duet with Billie Holiday. He worked as a musical director for many acts such as Diana Ross, both with and without the Supremes, the Four Tops, the Temptations, Stevie Wonder, the Jackson 5, Gladys Knight, Keni Burke and Linda Clifford.

Askey played as a jazz trumpeter for almost 25 years before arriving at Motown Records to work as a musical director, producer, songwriter and musical arranger for such artists as Billy Eckstine, Gladys Knight, the Temptations, the Supremes, Martha and the Vandellas, Marvin Gaye and Stevie Wonder, the Jackson 5 and the Funk Brothers. Askey was also part of Motown's Artists Development crew that included Maxine Powell, Maurice King, Cholly Atkins and Harvey Fuqua.

When Diana Ross became a solo performer, she hired Askey to be her musical director. He worked with her for 10 years and wrote the score for her first motion picture Lady Sings the Blues that earned him an Academy Awards nomination in 1972. In the mid and late 1970s, Askey worked with Curtis Mayfield, writing and arranging for his Curtom Record Company on recordings by Linda Clifford, The Jones Girls and Mayfield himself. When things got out hand during a show in Antwerp, Belgium, that starred the Four Tops, Askey went on the stage and played trumpet. Askey was the arranger and conductor for The Supremes during their successful runs at the Copa nightclub in New York.

After moving to Australia in 1988, Askey returned to performing in 1993, and continued to perform until his death from lymphoma in Melbourne on April 9, 2014.

In Melbourne, Askey taught and mentored young aspiring musicians. He also toured and played many regular gigs and jazz spots around the country until his death.

In 2025, Askey was inducted into the National Rhythm & Blues Hall of Fame.

== Discography ==
- Arranger, trumpet - Freddie McCoy Lonely Avenue - 1965
- Arranger, Band Leader, Conductor - The Supremes at the Copa - 1965
- Arranger - Diana Ross & the Supremes Sing and Perform "Funny Girl" - 1968
- Arranger, Conductor, Musical Direction - Diana Ross and the Supremes "Farewell" - 1970
- Conductor - Diana Ross "Lady Sings the Blues Soundtrack" - 1972
