= List of top 40 songs from films =

This is a partial list of songs that originated in movies that charted (Top 40) in either the United States or the United Kingdom, though frequently the version that charted is not the one found in the film.

Songs are all sourced from, and,.

For information concerning music from James Bond films see

== 1942 ==
Date (in US)	Movie title	Song title	Artist	Writer	US charts	UK charts	Miscellaneous
October 2	Holiday Inn	"White Christmas"	Bing Crosby	Irving Berlin	5	3	won Academy Award for Best Original Song in 1942; Crosby version also charted in 1943, 1944, 1945, 1946, 1947, 1948, 1949, 1950, 1951, 1954, 1955, 1957, 1960, 1961, and 1962; charted (US, #8) for Frank Sinatra in 1944.

== 1944 ==
Date (in US)	Movie title	Song title	Artist	Writer	US charts	UK charts	Miscellaneous
November 16	Adios Argentina (1934)	"Don't Fence Me In"	music by Cole Porter, lyrics by Robert Fletcher and Cole Porter	Bing Crosby and the Andrews Sisters	1		charted in US by Kate Smith (1945, #8), Horace Heidt (1945, #10), and Sammy Kaye (1945, #4), the Western Writers of America chose it as one of the Top 100 Western songs of all time.

== 1945 ==
Date (in US)	Movie title	Song title	Artist	Writer	US charts	UK charts	Miscellaneous
September 20	The Harvey Girls	“On the Atchison, Topeka and the Santa Fe”	Judy Garland	music by Harry Warren, lyrics by Johnny Mercer	10		

== 1950 ==
Date (in US)	Movie title	Song title	Artist	Writer	US charts	UK charts	Miscellaneous
February 10	The Third Man	"The Third Man Theme" (also known as "The Harry Lime Theme")	Anton Karas	Anton Karas	1		

== 1952 ==
Date (in US)	Movie title	Song title	Artist	Writer	US charts	UK charts	Miscellaneous
July 4, 1952	High Noon	"The Ballad of High Noon" (aka "Do Not Forsake Me, O My Darlin’")	Frankie Laine	music by Dimitri Tiomkin, lyrics by Ned Washington	5	7	awarded the 1952 Academy Award for Best Original Song

== 1953 ==
Date (in US)	Movie title	Song title	Artist	Writer	US charts	UK charts	Miscellaneous
March 28	Moulin Rouge	"The Song from Moulin Rouge" (also known as "Where Is Your Heart")	Georges Auric, original French lyrics by Jacques Larue, English lyrics by William Engvick	Percy Faith, vocals by Felicia Sanders	1	1	UK hit by Mantovani and His Orchestra

== 1954 ==
Date (in US)	Movie title	Song title	Artist	Writer	US charts	UK charts	Miscellaneous
July 21	The High and the Mighty	“The High and the Mighty”	LeRoy Holmes	music by Dimitri Tiomkin, lyrics by Ned Washington	9	20	also charted in the US in 1954 by Victor Young, # 8, Les Baxter #6 and Johnny Desmond # 28

== 1955 ==
Date (in US)	Movie title	Song title	Artist	Writer	US charts	UK charts	Miscellaneous
February 16	Davy Crockett, King of the Wild Frontier	"The Ballad of Davy Crockett"	Bill Hayes	music by George Bruns and lyrics by Thomas W. Blackburn	1	2	also Fess Parker US #5 and Tennessee Ernie Ford US #6/UK #3
April 9	Unchained	“Unchained Melody”	music by Alex North, lyrics by Hy Zaret	Les Baxter	1	10	also Roy Hamilton US #6, Jimmy Young UK #1, Al Hibbler US #3/UK #2, and in 1965 by The Righteous Brothers US #4/UK #14
August 27	Love Is a Many-Splendored Thing	"Love Is a Many-Splendored Thing"	The Four Aces	music by Sammy Fain, lyrics by Paul Francis Webster	1	2	won the Academy Award for Best Original Song in 1955
December 17	The Tender Trap	“(Love Is) The Tender Trap”	Frank Sinatra	music by Jimmy Van Heusen, lyrics by Sammy Cahn	7	2	

== 1956 ==
Date (in US)	Movie title	Song title	Artist	Writer	US charts	UK charts	Miscellaneous
February 13	The Man With the Golden Arm	"The Man With the Golden Arm"	Richard Maltby	Elmer Bernstein	14		also charted by Elmer Bernstein US# 16, Dick Jacobs US#22, The McGuire Sisters (as “Delilah Jones", lyrics by Sylvia Fine) US#37 #24UK, Billy May UK #9, Jet Harris 1962 #12UK
May 15	Picnic	“Theme from Picnic”	The McGuire Sisters	music by George Duning, lyrics by Steve Allen	13		the song also charted as a medley with the song Moonglow
July 7	The Man Who Knew Too Much	"Que Sera, Sera (Whatever Will Be, Will Be)"	Doris Day	music by Jay Livingston, lyrics by Ray Evans	2	1	won 1956 Academy Award for Best Original Song.
August 4	The Proud Ones	“Theme From The Proud Ones”	Nelson Riddle	Lionel Newman	39		
September 22	Friendly Persuasion	"Friendly Persuasion (Thee I Love)"	Pat Boone	music by Dimitri Tiomkin, lyrics by Paul Francis Webster	5	3	
October 6	High Society	“True Love”	Bing Crosby and Grace Kelly	Cole Porter	3	4	charted in US and UK by Terry Lightfoot's New Orleans Jazzmen, Richard Chamberlain, Jane Powell, Shakin' Stevens, Elton John &Kiki Dee
October 20	Love Me Tender	“Love Me Tender”	Elvis Presley	Ken Darby, Elvis Presley	1	11	

== 1957 ==
Date (in US)	Movie title	Song title	Artist	Writer	US charts	UK charts	Miscellaneous
July 22	Around the World in 80 Days	“Around the World”	Mantovani	music by Victor Young, lyrics by Harold Adamson	12	20	also Victor Young US #13 and Bing Crosby US #25, UK #5
October 14	Jailhouse Rock	“Jailhouse Rock”	Elvis Presley	Leiber, Stoller	1	1	
December 17	Tammy and the Bachelor	"Tammy"	Debbie Reynolds	Jay Livingston and Ray Evans	1	2	The Ames Brothers version reached US#5 the same week Reynold’s topped the chart

== 1958 ==
Date (in US)	Movie title	Song title	Artist	Writer	US charts	UK charts	Miscellaneous
June 30	King Creole	“Hard Headed Woman”	Elvis Presley	Claude DeMetrius	1	2	
July 14	King Creole	"Don't Ask Me Why"	Elvis Presley	lyrics by Fred Wise, music by Ben Weisman	25		
October 4	King Creole	"King Creole"	Elvis Presley	Leiber, Stoller		2	

== 1960 ==
Date (in US)	Movie title	Song title	Artist	Writer	US charts	UK charts	Miscellaneous
January 25	A Summer Place	"Theme from A Summer Place"	Percy Faith	Mack Discant and Max Steiner	1	2	won Grammy Award for Record of the Year in 1961, also US #16 for The Lettermen
July 4	Circus of Horrors	"Look for a Star"	Garry Mills	Franz Reizenstein, Muir Mathieson	26	7	
August 8	The Apartment	"Theme from The Apartment"	Ferrante & Teicher	Adolph Deutsch	10	44	
August 8	The Wizard of Oz	“Over the Rainbow“	The Demensions	music by Harold Arlen, lyrics by Yip Harburg	16		won the Academy Award for Best Original Song in 1939
November 28	Exodus	"Theme from Exodus"	Ferrante & Teicher	Ernest Gold	2	6	

== 1961 ==
Date (in US)	Movie title	Song title	Artist	Writer	US charts	UK charts	Miscellaneous
March 13	Wild in the Country	“Lonely Man”	Elvis Presley	Bennie Benjamin, Sol Marcus	32		recorded for the film, but not used
April 24	Flaming Star	“Flaming Star”	Elvis Presley	Sid Wayne, Sherman Edwards	14		
May 13	The Frightened City	"The Frightened City"	The Shadows	Norrie Paramor		3	
June 19	Wild in the Country	“Wild in the Country”	Elvis Presley	Hugo Peretti, Luigi Creatore, George Weiss	26	4	
July 3	Never on Sunday	“Never on Sunday”	Manos Hadjidakis	The Chordettes	13		won 1960 Academy Award for Best Original Song; also Don Costa US #19, UK #27
September 18	The Parent Trap	"Let's Get Together"	Hayley Mills	Robert and Richard Sherman	8	17	
April 17	One-Eyed Jacks	"(Love Theme From) One Eyed Jacks"	Ferrante & Teicher	Hugo Friedhofer	37		
October 16	West Side Story	"Tonight"	Ferrante & Teicher	music by Leonard Bernstein, lyrics by Stephen Sondheim	8		also Shirley Bassey UK #21
November 13	Breakfast at Tiffany's	"Moon River"	Henry Mancini	music by Henry Mancini, lyrics by Johnny Mercer	11	44	won 1961 Academy Award for Best Original Song, also 1962 Grammy Awards for Record of the Year and Song of the Year.
December 18	Town Without Pity	“Town Without Pity”	Gene Pitney	music by Dimitri Tiomkin, lyrics by Ned Washington	13	32	

== 1962 ==
Date (in US)	Movie title	Song title	Artist	Writer	US charts	UK charts	Miscellaneous
May 19	Follow That Dream	“Follow That Dream”	Elvis Presley	music Fred Wise lyrics by Ben Weisman	15	34	UK charting as an EP
May 19	The Man Who Shot Liberty Valance	"(The Man Who Shot) Liberty Valance"	Gene Pitney	Music by Burt Bacharach, lyrics by Hal David	4		ranked No. 36 in the Western Writers of America's list of the top 100 Western songs of all time, as compiled from a survey of its members; not included in movie.
October 6	Kid Galahad	"King of the Whole Wide World"	Elvis Presley	Bob Roberts, Ruth Bachelor	30		released as an EP
October 27	Girls! Girls! Girls!	"Return to Sender"	Elvis Presley	Winfield Scott, Otis Blackwell	2	1	

== 1963 ==
Date (in US)	Movie title	Song title	Artist	Writer	US charts	UK charts	Miscellaneous
January 26	Days of Wine and Roses	"Days of Wine and Roses"	Henry Mancini	music by Henry Mancini, lyrics by Johnny Mercer	33		won 1962 Academy Award for Best Original Song; also Andy Williams US #26
February 23	It Happened at the World's Fair	"One Broken Heart for Sale"	Elvis Presley	Winfield Scott, Otis Blackwell	2	1	
July 6	Mondo Cane	“More”	Kai Winding	Riz Ortolani, Nino Oliviero	8		instrumental version; the vocal version by Vic Dana peaked at US #42
November 2	Fun in Acapulco	“Bossa Nova Baby“	Elvis Presley	Leiber, Stoller	8	13	

== 1964 ==
Date (in US)	Movie title	Song title	Artist	Writer	US charts	UK charts	Miscellaneous
January 25	Charade	"Charade"	Henry Mancini	music by Henry Mancini, lyrics by Johnny Mercer	36		nominated for 1964 Academy Award for Best Original Song
March 7	Kissin' Cousins	“Kissin' Cousins“	Elvis Presley	Fred Wise, Randy Starr	12	10	
April 18	The Pink Panther	"The Pink Panther Theme"	Henry Mancini	Henry Mancini	31	14	UK charting for EP "The Pink Panther"; Saxophone by Plas Johnson
May 30	Viva Las Vegas	“Viva Las Vegas“	Elvis Presley	Doc Pomus, Mort Shuman	29	17	
July 18	A Hard Day's Night	“A Hard Day's Night”	The Beatles	Lennon–McCartney	1	1	
December 19	Dear Heart	"Dear Heart"	Andy Williams	Henry Mancini, Ray Evans, Jay Livingston	24		

== 1965 ==
Date (in US)	Movie title	Song title	Artist	Writer	US charts	UK charts	Miscellaneous
March 13	Girl Happy	“Do the Clam“	Elvis Presley	Sid Wayne, Ben Weisman, and Dolores Fuller	21	19	
July 3	Tickle Me	"(Such an) Easy Question"	Elvis Presley	Otis Blackwell, Winfield Scott	11	19	
July 3	What's New Pussycat?	“What's New Pussycat?”	Tom Jones	music by Burt Bacharach lyrics by Hal David	3	11	
August 14	Help	“Help!"	The Beatles	Lennon–McCartney	1	1	
September 4	Catch Us If You Can (aka Having a Wild Weekend in US)	“Catch Us If You Can”	The Dave Clark Five	Dave Clark, Lenny Davidson	4	5	
December 4	Girl Happy	“Puppet on a String”	Elvis Presley	Roy C. Bennett, Sid Tepper	14		

== 1966 ==
Date (in US)	Movie title	Song title	Artist	Writer	US charts	UK charts	Miscellaneous
April 17	Baby the Rain Must Fall	"Baby the Rain Must Fall"	Glenn Yarbrough	Elmer Bernstein, Ernie Sheldon	12		
May 28	A Man Could Get Killed	"Strangers in the Night"	Frank Sinatra	music by Bert Kaempfert, English lyrics by Charles Singleton and Eddie Snyder	1	1	won 1966 Grammy Award for Best Male Pop Vocal Performance and Grammy Award for Record of the Year, as well as 1967 Grammy Award for Best Arrangement Accompanying a Vocalist or Instrumentalist for Ernie Freeman
July 9	Doctor Zhivago	"Lara's Theme" aka "Somewhere My Love"	Ray Conniff Singers	music by Maurice Jarre, lyrics by Paul Francis Webster	9		
August 20	Alfie	“Alfie”	Cher	music by Burt Bacharach, lyrics by Hal David	32		also Dionne Warwick US #15, Cilla Black UK #9
October 15	Born Free	“Born Free”	Roger Williams	music by John Barry, lyrics by Don Black	7		also The Hesitations US #38
November 5	Spinout	“Spinout”	Elvis Presley	Ben Weisman, Dolores Fuller, Sid Wayne	40		
November 27	The War Lord	"The War Lord"	The Shadows	Jerome Moross		18	

== 1967 ==
Date (in US)	Movie title	Song title	Artist	Writer	US charts	UK charts	Miscellaneous
February 25	You're a Big Boy Now	"Darling Be Home Soon"	The Lovin' Spoonful	John Sebastian	15	44	
April 15	The Happening	“The Happening”	The Supremes	Holland–Dozier–Holland and Frank De Vol	1	6	
May 6	Double Trouble	“Long Legged Girl (with the Short Dress On)”	Elvis Presley	John Leslie McFarland, Winfield Scott	63	49	
May 13	Easy Come, Easy Go	“You Gotta Stop/Love Machine”	Elvis Presley	Bernie Baum, Bill Giant, Florence Kaye/Chuck Taylor, Fred Burch, Gerald Nelson		38	released as an EP Easy Come, Easy Go

== 1968 ==
Date (in US)	Movie title	Song title	Artist	Writer	US charts	UK charts	Miscellaneous
May 4	The Graduate	“Mrs. Robinson”	Simon & Garfunkel	Paul Simon	1	4	It became the first rock song to win Record of the Year, and it also was awarded the Grammy for Best Contemporary-Pop Performance – Vocal Duo or Group.

== 1969 ==
Date (in US)	Movie title	Song title	Artist	Writer	US charts	UK charts	Miscellaneous
November 29	Midnight Cowboy	"Midnight Cowboy"	Ferrante & Teicher	John Barry	10		
August 2	The Trouble with Girls	"Clean Up Your Own Backyard"	Elvis Presley	Mac Davis, Billy Strange	35	21	
August 16	Midnight Cowboy	"Everybody's Talkin'"	Nilsson	Fred Neil	6	23	won 1970 Grammy Award for Best Male Pop Vocal Performance
August 23	True Grit	“True Grit”	Glen Campbell	lyrics by Don Black, music by Elmer Bernstein	35		
November 1	Butch Cassidy and the Sundance Kid	"Raindrops Keep Fallin' on My Head"	B. J. Thomas	Burt Bacharach	1	38	won 1970 Academy Award for Best Original Song
December 20	The Sterile Cuckoo	"Come Saturday Morning"	The Sandpipers	music by Fred Karlin, lyrics by Dory Previn	17		nominated for 1970 Academy Award for Best Original Song

== 1970 ==
Date (in US)	Movie title	Song title	Artist	Writer	US charts	UK charts	Miscellaneous

== 1971 ==
Date (in US)	Movie title	Song title	Artist	Writer	US charts	UK charts	Miscellaneous
February 27	Love Story	"(Where Do I Begin?) Love Story"	Andy Williams	music by Francis Lai, lyrics by Carl Sigman	3	4	also Henry Mancini US #13, Francois Lai US #31
October 23	Shaft	"Theme from Shaft"	Isaac Hayes	Isaac Hayes	1	4	won the 1972 Academy Award for Best Original Song,
November 20	Summer of '42	“The Summer Knows” (aka "Theme From Summer of ’42")	Peter Nero	Michel Legrand	21		

== 1972 ==
Date (in US)	Movie title	Song title	Artist	Writer	US charts	UK charts	Miscellaneous
May 20	The Godfather	"Speak Softly, Love", also known as "Love Theme from The Godfather"	Andy Williams	music by Nino Rota, lyrics by Larry Kusik	34	42	
July 12	Ben	"Ben"	Michael Jackson	Don Black and Walter Scharf	1	7	Nominated for the Academy Award for Best Original Song in 1973
September 23	Super Fly	“Freddie's Dead“	Curtis Mayfield	Curtis Mayfield	4		
November 25	Super Fly	"Super Fly"	Curtis Mayfield	Curtis Mayfield	8		
December 12	The Poseidon Adventure	"The Morning After"	Maureen McGovern	Joel Hirschhorn and Al Kasha	1		Won the Academy Award for Best Original Song in 1973

== 1973 ==
Date (in US)	Movie title	Song title	Artist	Writer	US charts	UK charts	Miscellaneous
June 1	Live and Let Die	"Live and Let Die"	Paul McCartney and Wings	Paul McCartney and Linda McCartney	2	9	Later covered by Guns N' Roses US #33/UK #5, Nominated for the Academy Award for Best Original Song in 1974
August 25	Cleopatra Jones	“Theme from Cleopatra Jones”	Joe Simon	Joe Simon	18		
September 29	Pat Garrett and Billy the Kid	"Knockin' on Heaven's Door"	Bob Dylan	Bob Dylan	12	14	also Eric Clapton UK #38, Guns N' Roses US #18/UK #2, Dunblane tribute UK #1
December 22	The Way We Were	“The Way We Were”	Barbra Streisand	Alan Bergman, Marilyn Bergman, Marvin Hamlisch	1	31	won the Academy Award for Best Original Song in 1974

== 1975 ==
Date (in US)	Movie title	Song title	Artist	Writer	US charts	UK charts	Miscellaneous
May	Nashville	"I'm Easy"	Keith Carradine	Keith Carradine	17		Won the Academy Award for Best Original Song in 1976
September 13	Jaws	“Theme from Jaws”	John Williams	John Williams	34	42	
September 24	Mahogany	"Theme from Mahogany (Do You Know Where You're Going To)"	Diana Ross	Michael Masser and Gerald Goffin	1	5	Nominated for the Academy Award for Best Original Song

== 1976 ==
Date (in US)	Movie title	Song title	Artist	Writer	US charts	UK charts	Miscellaneous
December 11	Car Wash	“Car Wash”	Rose Royce	Norman Whitfield	1	9	
December 22	A Star Is Born	“Evergreen (Love Theme from A Star Is Born)”	Barbra Streisand	Barbra Streisand, Paul Williams	1	3	Streisand and Williams earned an Academy Award for Best Original Song, the first woman to be honored as a composer. Streisand also earned a Grammy Award for Song of the Year

== 1977 ==
Date (in US)	Movie title	Song title	Artist	Writer	US charts	UK charts	Miscellaneous
March 19	Car Wash	“I Wanna Get Next to You”	Rose Royce	Norman Whitfield	10	14	
May 7	Rocky	“Gonna Fly Now", also known as "Theme from Rocky”	Bill Conti	music by Bill Conti, lyrics by Carol Connors and Ayn Robbins	1		
August 13	Star Wars	“Star Wars (Main Title)"	John Williams	John Williams	10		
September 17	You Light Up My Life	"You Light Up My Life"	Debby Boone	Joe Brooks	1	48	Won the Oscar for Best Original Song, and spent 10 weeks at number one, becoming the longest running number one song, and the biggest hit of the 1970s
October 8	Saturday Night Fever	"How Deep Is Your Love"	Bee Gees	Barry Gibb, Robin Gibb and Maurice Gibb	1	3	
December 24	Saturday Night Fever	"Stayin' Alive"	Bee Gees	Barry Gibb, Robin Gibb and Maurice Gibb	1	4	

== 1978 ==
Date (in US)	Movie title	Song title	Artist	Writer	US charts	UK charts	Miscellaneous
January 21	Close Encounters of the Third Kind	“Theme from Close Encounters of the Third Kind”	John Williams	John Williams	13		won a Grammy Award
February 11	Saturday Night Fever	"Night Fever"	Bee Gees	Barry Gibb, Robin Gibb and Maurice Gibb	1	1	
February 25	Thank God It's Friday	"Thank God It's Friday"	Love & Kisses	Alec R. Costandinos	22		
February 25	Saturday Night Fever	"If I Can't Have You"	Yvonne Elliman	Barry Gibb, Robin Gibb and Maurice Gibb	1	4	
March 25	Saturday Night Fever	"Boogie Shoes"	KC and the Sunshine Band	Harry Wayne Casey and Richard Finch	35		
April 8	Grease	"You're the One That I Want"	John Travolta and Olivia Newton-John	John Farrar	1	1	Nominated for a Golden Globe for Best Original Song
June 3	Thank God It's Friday	"Last Dance"	Donna Summer	Paul Jabara	3	70	won Academy, Golden Globe Award for Best Original Song, and Grammy Award for Best Female R&B Vocal Performance
June 17	Grease	"Grease"	Frankie Valli	Barry Gibb	1	3	
July 1	FM	"FM (No Static at All)"	Steely Dan	Walter Becker and Donald Fagen	22	49	
July 22	Grease	"Hopelessly Devoted to You"	Olivia Newton-John	John Farrar	3	2	Nominated for an Academy Award and a Golden Globe for Best Original Song
August 5	Sgt. Pepper's Lonely Hearts Club Band	"Got to Get You Into My Life"	Earth, Wind & Fire	John Lennon and Paul McCartney	9	33	Cover of the song originally by The Beatles
August 19	Grease	"Summer Nights"	John Travolta and Olivia Newton-John	Jim Jacobs and Warren Casey	5	1	
August 19	Sgt. Pepper's Lonely Hearts Club Band	"Oh! Darling"	Robin Gibb	John Lennon and Paul McCartney	15		
September 2	Sgt. Pepper's Lonely Hearts Club Band	"Come Together"	Aerosmith	John Lennon and Paul McCartney	23		
October 7	Grease	"Sandy"	John Travolta	Louis St. Louis and Screamin' Scott Simon		2	European release
October 7	Foul Play	"Ready to Take a Chance Again"	Barry Manilow	Charles Fox and Norman Gimbel	11		Nominated for an Academy Award for Best Original Song
December 10	Grease	"Greased Lightnin'"	John Travolta	Jim Jacobs and Warren Casey	47	11	
December 22	Eyes of Laura Mars	“Prisoner” (aka “Love Theme from Eyes of Laura Mars”)	Barbra Streisand	Karen Lawrence, John DeSautels	21		

== 1979 ==
Date (in US)	Movie title	Song title	Artist	Writer	US charts	UK charts	Miscellaneous
May 19	The Walking Stick	“The Theme from The Deer Hunter” (aka "Cavatina” or "He Was Beautiful")	John Williams	music John Williams, lyrics Cleo Laine		15	also Iris Williams UK #18 and The Shadows UK #9
October 20	The Muppet Movie	"Rainbow Connection"	Jim Henson as Kermit the Frog	Paul Williams and Kenneth Ascher	25		Nominated for an Oscar for Best Original Song

== 1980 ==
Date (in US)	Movie title	Song title	Artist	Writer	US charts	UK charts	Miscellaneous
March 1	The Rose	"When a Man Loves a Woman"	Bette Midler	Calvin Lewis and Andrew Wright	35		
March 8	American Gigolo	"Call Me"	Blondie	Debbie Harry and Giorgio Moroder	1	1	
April 26	American Gigolo	"The Seduction (Love Theme)"	The James Last Band	Giorgio Moroder	28		
April 26	The Rose	"The Rose"	Bette Midler	Amanda McBroom	3		
May 31	New York, New York	“Theme from New York, New York"	Frank Sinatra	music John Kander, lyrics Fred Ebb	32	59	UK #4 when rereleased in 1984
June 14	Urban Cowboy	"All Night Long"	Joe Walsh	Joe Walsh	19		
June 14	Xanadu	"Magic"	Olivia Newton-John	John Farrar	1	32	
June 14	Xanadu	"I'm Alive"	Electric Light Orchestra	Jeff Lynne	16	20	
June 21	The Blues Brothers	"Gimme Some Lovin'"	The Blues Brothers	Steve Winwood, Spencer Davis and Muff Winwood	18		
June 28	Urban Cowboy	"Stand By Me"	Mickey Gilley	Ben E. King, Jerry Leiber and Mike Stoller	22		
June 28	Urban Cowboy	"Love the World Away"	Kenny Rogers	Bob Morrison and Johnny Wilson	14		
July 26	Fame	"Fame"	Irene Cara	Michael Gore and Dean Pitchford	4		Won the Oscar for Best Original Song, UK #1 when rereleased in 1982
August 2	Urban Cowboy	"Lookin' For Love"	Johnny Lee	Wanda Mallette, Bob Morrison and Patti Ryan	5		
August 16	Xanadu	"All Over the World"	Electric Light Orchestra	Jeff Lynne	13	11	
August 16	Can't Stop the Music	"Can't Stop the Music"	Village People	Jacques Morali		11	
August 23	Caddyshack	“I'm Alright”	Kenny Loggins	Kenny Loggins	7		
August 30	Xanadu	"Xanadu"	Olivia-Newton John and Electric Light Orchestra	Jeff Lynne	8	1	
September 6	Urban Cowboy	"Look What You've Done to Me"	Boz Scaggs	Boz Scaggs and David Foster	14		
September 27	Fame	"Out Here On My Own"	Irene Cara	Lesley Gore and Michael Gore	19	58	Nominated for an Oscar for Best Original Song
September 27	Honeysuckle Rose	"On the Road Again"	Willie Nelson	Willie Nelson	20		Nominated for an Oscar for Best Original Song and won a Grammy Award for Best Country Song
October 18	Urban Cowboy	"Could I Have This Dance"	Anne Murray	Wayland Holyfield and Bob House	33		
November 1	The Jazz Singer	"Love on the Rocks"	Neil Diamond	Neil Diamond and Gilbert Bécaud	2	17	
November 22	Xanadu	"Suddenly"	Olivia Newton-John and Cliff Richard	John Farrar	20	15	
November 22	Xanadu	"Don't Walk Away"	Electric Light Orchestra	Jeff Lynne		21	
December 20	9 to 5	"9 to 5"	Dolly Parton	Dolly Parton	1	47	Nominated for an Oscar for Best Original Song and won two Grammy Awards for Best Country Song and Best Female Country Performance

== 1981 ==
Date (in US)	Movie title	Song title	Artist	Writer	US charts	UK charts	Miscellaneous
January 31	The Jazz Singer	"Hello Again"	Neil Diamond	Neil Diamond and Alan Lindgren	6	51	
May 2	The Jazz Singer	"America"	Neil Diamond	Neil Diamond	8		
July 18	Endless Love	"Endless Love”	Lionel Richie and Diana Ross	Lionel Richie	1	7	Nominated for an Oscar for Best Original Song
August 22	For Your Eyes Only	"For Your Eyes Only"	Sheena Easton	Bill Conti and Mick Leeson	4	8	Nominated for an Oscar for Best Original Song
August 29	Arthur	"Arthur's Theme (Best That You Can Do)"	Christopher Cross	Christopher Cross, Burt Bacharach, Carole Bayer Sager and Peter Allen	1	7	Won the Oscar and the Golden Globe for Best Original Song

== 1982 ==
Date (in US)	Movie title	Song title	Artist	Writer	US charts	UK charts	Miscellaneous
February 20	Chariots of Fire	"Chariots of Fire"	Vangelis	Vangelis	1	12	
April 17	Cat People	"Cat People (Putting Out Fire)"	David Bowie	Giorgio Moroder	67	26	
June 26	Rocky III	"Eye of the Tiger"	Survivor	Frankie Sullivan and Jim Peterik	1	1	Nominated for the Academy Award for Best Original Song
August 21	Fast Times at Ridgemont High	“Somebody's Baby”	Jackson Browne	Jackson Browne, Danny Kortchmar	7		
October 2	An Officer and a Gentleman	“Up Where We Belong”	Joe Cocker and Jennifer Warnes	Jack Nitzsche, Buffy Sainte-Marie, Will Jennings	1	7	won both the Academy Award and Golden Globe Award for Best Original Song

== 1983 ==
Date (in US)	Movie title	Song title	Artist	Writer	US charts	UK charts	Miscellaneous
April 2	Tootsie	"It Might Be You"	Stephen Bishop	Dave Grusin, Alan Bergman and Marilyn Bergman	25	99	Nominated for an Oscar for Best Original Song
April 16	Flashdance	"Flashdance... What a Feeling"	Irene Cara	Giorgio Moroder and Keith Forsey	1	2	Won an Oscar, a Golden Globe for Best Original Song, and a Grammy Award
May 28	Staying Alive	"The Woman In You"	Bee Gees	Barry Gibb, Robin Gibb and Maurice Gibb	24	81	
July 2	Flashdance	"Maniac"	Michael Sembello	Dennis Matkosky and Michael Sembello	1	43	Nominated for an Oscar and a Golden Globe for Best Original Song
August 20	Staying Alive	"Far From Over"	Frank Stallone	Frank Stallone and Vince DiCola	10	68	Nominated for a Golden Globe for Best Original Song
December 10	Yentl	"The Way He Makes Me Feel"	Barbra Streisand	Alan Bergman, Marilyn Bergman and Michel Legrand	40		Nominated for an Oscar for Best Original Song

== 1984 ==
Date (in US)	Movie title	Song title	Artist	Writer	US charts	UK charts	Miscellaneous
February 11	Footloose	“Footloose”	Kenny Loggins	Kenny Loggins and Dean Pitchford	1	6	Nominated for an Oscar for Best Original Song
March 10	Against All Odds	"Against All Odds (Take a Look at Me Now)"	Phil Collins	Phil Collins	1	2	Nominated for an Academy Award and a Golden Globe Award for Best Original Song and won a Grammy Award for Best Male Pop Vocal Performance
March 17	Hard to Hold	"Love Somebody"	Rick Springfield	Rick Springfield	5	95	
April 7	Footloose	"Holding Out For a Hero"	Bonnie Tyler	Jim Steinman and Dean Pitchford	34	99	UK #2 when re-released in 1985
April 14	Footloose	"Let's Hear It For the Boy"	Deniece Williams	Tom Snow and Dean Pitchford	1	2	Nominated for an Academy Award for Best Original Sog
April 14	Footloose	"Dancing in the Sheets"	Shalamar	Bill Wolfer and Dean Pitchford	17	41	
May 19	Footloose	"Almost Paradise... Love Theme from Footloose"	Mike Reno and Ann Wilson	Eric Carmen and Dean Pitchford	7		
June 2	Streets of Fire	"I Can Dream About You"	Dan Hartman	Dan Hartman	6	12	
June 9	Hard to Hold	"Don't Walk Away"	Rick Springfield	Rick Springfield	26		
June 9	Purple Rain	"When Doves Cry"	Prince	Prince	1	4	
June 16	Breakin'	"Breakin'... There's No Stopping Us"	Ollie & Jerry	Ollie Brown and Jerry Knight	9	5	
June 23	Footloose	"I'm Free (Heaven Helps the Man)"	Kenny Loggins	Kenny Loggins and Dean Pitchford	22		
June 30	Ghostbusters	"Ghostbusters"	Ray Parker Jr.	Ray Parker Jr.	1	2	Nominated for an Academy Award for Best Original Song
August 11	Purple Rain	"Let's Go Crazy"	Prince and the Revolution	Prince	1	7	
September 1	The Woman In Red	"I Just Called to Say I Love You"	Stevie Wonder	Stevie Wonder	1	1	Won an Oscar and a Golden Globe for Best Original Song and nominated for three Grammy Awards
September 8	Hard to Hold	"Bop 'Til You Drop"	Rick Springfield	Rick Springfield	20		
September 15	Eddie and the Cruisers	"On the Dark Side"	John Cafferty and the Beaver Brown Band	John Cafferty	7		Originally peaked at number 64 on its original release in 1983, the song was re-released in 1984 from renewed interest in the film from its successful screenings on HBO and from home video
October 6	Purple Rain	"Purple Rain"	Prince and the Revolution	Prince	2	6	
November 17	Nineteen Eighty-Four	"Sexcrime (Nineteen Eighty-Four)"	Eurythmics	Annie Lennox and Dave Stewart	81	4	
December 8	Eddie and the Cruisers	"Tender Lover"	John Cafferty and the Beaver Brown Band	John Cafferty	31		Originally peaked at number 78 earlier that year
December 15	The Woman In Red	"Love Light in Flight"	Stevie Wonder	Stevie Wonder	17	44	
December 22	Purple Rain	"I Would Die 4 U"	Prince and the Revolution	Prince	8	58	

== 1985 ==
Date (in US)	Movie title	Song title	Artist	Writer	US charts	UK charts	Miscellaneous
January 19	Beverly Hills Cop	"The Heat Is On"	Glenn Frey	Harold Faltermeyer and Keith Forsey	2	12	
February 2	Vision Quest	"Only the Young"	Journey	Jonathan Cain, Steve Perry and Neal Schon	9		
March 2	Purple Rain	"Take Me With U"	Prince and the Revolution	Prince	25	7	
March 9	The Last Dragon	"Rhythm of the Night"	DeBarge	Diane Warren	3	4	
March 16	Vision Quest	"Crazy For You"	Madonna	John Bettis and Jon Lind	1	2	
March 23	The Breakfast Club	"Don't You (Forget About Me)"	Simple Minds	Keith Forsey and Steve Schiff	1	7	
April 6	Beverly Hills Cop	"New Attitude"	Patti LaBelle	Sharon Robinson, Jon Gilutin, and Bunny Hull	17		
April 13	Beverly Hills Cop	"Axel F"	Harold Faltermeyer	Harold Faltermeyer	3	2	
April 27	A Night in Heaven	"Heaven"	Bryan Adams	Bryan Adams and Jim Vallance	1	38	Originally released in 1983, re-released as a single two years later as part of his album, Reckless
May 24	A View to a Kill	"A View to a Kill"	Duran Duran	Duran Duran and John Barry	1	2	
June 1	The Goonies	"The Goonies 'R' Good Enough"	Cyndi Lauper	Cyndi Lauper, Stephen Broughton Lunt and Arthur Stead	10		
July 6	Back to the Future	"The Power of Love"	Huey Lewis and the News	Huey Lewis, Chris Hayes and Johnny Colla	1	9	Nominated for an Academy Award for Best Original Song
July 20	St. Elmo's Fire	"St. Elmo's Fire (Man In Motion)"	John Parr	David Foster and John Parr	1	6	
July 20	Mad Max Beyond Thunderdome	"We Don't Need Another Hero (Thunderdome)"	Tina Turner	Graham Lyle and Terry Britten	2	3	Nominated for a Golden Globe for Best Original Song
July 27	The Legend of Billie Jean	"Invincible"	Pat Benatar	Simon Climie and Holly Knight	10	53	
September 7	Body Rock	"Body Rock"	Maria Vidal	Sylvester Levay and John Bettis	48	11	Originally released in 1984, became a top 40 hit in the UK a year later
October 5	St. Elmo's Fire	"Love Theme from St. Elmo's Fire"	David Foster	David Foester	15		
October 12	Mad Max Beyond Thunderdome	"One of the Living"	Tina Turner	Holly Knight	15	55	
October 12	Vision Quest	"Gambler"	Madonna	Madonna		4	Released only in Europe
October 12	White Nights	"Separate Lives"	Phil Collins and Marilyn Martin	Stephen Bishop	1	4	Nominated for an Academy Award and a Golden Globe for Best Original Song
November 9	White Nights	"Say You, Say Me"	Lionel Richie	Lionel Richie	1	8	Won an Academy Award for Best Original Song and a Golden Globe Award for Best Original Song
November 23	Rocky IV	"Burning Heart"	Survivor	Jim Peterik and Frankie Sullivan	2	5	
December 14	Spies Like Us	"Spies Like Us"	Paul McCartney	Paul McCartney	7	13	

== 1986 ==
Date (in US)	Movie title	Song title	Artist	Writer	US charts	UK charts	Miscellaneous
January 11	Rocky IV	"Living In America"	James Brown	Dan Hartman and Charlie Midnight	4	5	
March 1	Rocky IV	"No Easy Way Out"	Robert Tepper	Robert Tepper	22		
March 8	Under the Cherry Moon	"Kiss"	Prince and the Revolution	Prince	1	9	
March 29	Highlander	"A Kind of Magic"	Queen	Roger Taylor	42	3	
April 5	9½ Weeks	"I Do What I Do..."	John Taylor	John Taylor, Jonathan Elias and Michael Des Barres	23	42	
April 19	At Close Range	"Live to Tell"	Madonna	Madonna and Patrick Leonard	1	2	
May 17	Short Circuit	"Who's Johnny"	El DeBarge	Peter Wolf and Ina Wolf	3		
May 25	Maximum Overdrive	"Who Made Who"	AC/DC	Angus Young, Malcolm Young and Brian Johnson		16	Charted at number 23 in the US on the Mainstream Rock chart
June 7	Top Gun	"Danger Zone"	Kenny Loggins	music by Giorgio Moroder, lyrics by Tom Whitlock	8	45	The band Toto was originally intended to perform the track, but legal conflicts between the producers of Top Gun and the band's lawyers prevented this.
June 14	Under the Cherry Moon	"Mountains"	Prince and the Revolution	Prince, Lisa Coleman and Wendy Melvoin	23	45	
June 14	Legal Eagles	"Love Touch"	Rod Stewart	Michael Chapman and Holly Knight	6	27	
June 21	Labyrinth	"Underground"	David Bowie	David Bowie		21	Although the song didn't chart on the Hot 100 in the US, it charted at number 18 on the Mainstream Rock charts
June 21	Ruthless People	"Modern Woman"	Billy Joel	Billy Joel	10		
June 21	The Karate Kid Part II	"Glory of Love"	Peter Cetera	Peter Cetera, Diane Nini and David Foster	1	3	Nominated for an Academy Award for Best Original Song
July 12	Running Scared	"Sweet Freedom"	Michael McDonald	Rod Temperton	7	4	
July 19	Top Gun	"Take My Breath Away"	Berlin	music by Giorgio Moroder, lyrics by Tom Whitlock	1	1	Won the Oscar and the Golden Globe for Best Original Song
August 2	Running Scared	"Man Size Love"	Klymaxx	Rod Temperton	15		
August 16	Under the Cherry Moon	"Girls & Boys"	Prince and the Revolution	Prince		11	Single not released in the US, but later released as a B-side to "Anotherloverholenyohead".
August 23	Top Gun	"Heaven In Your Eyes"	Loverboy	Paul Dean, John Dexter, Mae Moore, Mike Reno	12		
September 27	Highlander	"Who Wants to Live Forever"	Queen	Brian May		24	
November 1	Under the Cherry Moon	"Anotherloverholenyohead"	Prince and the Revolution	Prince	63	36	

== 1987 ==
Date (in US)	Movie title	Song title	Artist	Writer	US charts	UK charts	Miscellaneous
January 24	An American Tail	“Somewhere Out There”	Linda Ronstadt and James Ingram	James Horner, Barry Mann, Cynthia Weil	2	8	at the 30th Grammy Awards, the song won two awards, one for Song of the Year and the other for Best Song Written Specifically for a Motion Picture or Television
February 14	Mannequin	"Nothing's Gonna Stop Us Now"	Starship	Diane Warren and Albert Hammond	1	1	Nominated for an Academy Award for Best Original Song
March 21	Light of Day	"Light of Day"	The Barbusters (Joan Jett and the Blackhearts)	Bruce Springsteen	33		
April 25	Over the Top	“Meet Me Half Way”	Kenny Loggins	Kenny Loggins, Michael Towers	11		
May 30	Beverly Hills Cop II	"Shakedown"	Bob Seger	Harold Faltermeyer and Keith Forsey	1	88	
June 20	Beverly Hills Cop II	"I Want Your Sex"	George Michael	George Michael	2	3	
June 27	Beverly Hills Cop II	"Cross My Broken Heart"	The Jets	Stephen Bray and Tony Pierce	7		
July 18	Who's That Girl	"Who's That Girl"	Madonna	Madonna and Patrick Leonard	1	1	
July 18	La Bamba	"La Bamba"	Los Lobos	Ritchie Valens	1	1	
July 25	Innerspace	"Hypnotize Me"	Wang Chung	Nick Feldman and Jack Hues	36		
August 15	Disorderlies	"I Heard a Rumour"	Bananarama		4	14	
September 19	Who's That Girl	"Causing a Commotion"	Madonna		2	4	
October 10	Dirty Dancing	“(I've Had) The Time of My Life”	Bill Medley and Jennifer Warnes	John DeNicola, Donald Markowitz, Franke Previte	2	8	won Academy Award for "Best Original Song", Golden Globe Award for "Best Original Song", and Grammy Award for Best Pop Performance by a Duo or Group with Vocals.
October 17	La Bamba	"Come On, Let's Go"	Los Lobos	Ritchie Valens	21	18	
December 5	Less Than Zero	"Hazy Shade of Winter"	The Bangles	Paul Simon	2	11	
December 12	Dirty Dancing	"Hungry Eyes"	Eric Carmen		4	82	

== 1988 ==
Date (in US)	Movie title	Song title	Artist	Writer	US charts	UK charts	Miscellaneous
January 16	Dirty Dancing	"She's Like the Wind"	Patrick Swayze featuring Wendy Fraser	Patrick Swayze, Stacy Widelitz	3	17	
February 20	Hiding Out	"Live My Life"	Boy George	Allee Willis, Danny Sembello	40		
March 26	Less Than Zero	"Going Back to Cali"	LL Cool J	Rick Rubin, James Todd Smith	31		
April 16	Bright Lights, Big City	"Kiss and Tell"	Bryan Ferry	Bryan Ferry	31	41	
May 14	School Daze	"Da Butt"	E.U.	Marcus Miller, Mark Stevens	35	87	
July 2	Dirty Dancing	"Do You Love Me"	The Contours	Berry Gordy Jr.	11	76	Originally peaked at #3 in 1962, re-released as a single from the Dirty Dancing companion album, More Dirty Dancing
July 30	Caddyshack II	"Nobody's Fool"	Kenny Loggins	Kenny Loggins, Michael Towers	8		
August 13	Cocktail	"Don't Worry, Be Happy"	Bobby McFerrin	Bobby McFerrin	1	2	
September 17	Buster	"A Groovy Kind of Love"	Phil Collins	Carole Bayer Sager, Toni Wine	1	1	
September 24	Cocktail	"Kokomo"	The Beach Boys	John Phillips, Scott McKenzie, Mike Love, and Terry Melcher	1	25	
November 26	Buster	"Two Hearts"	Phil Collins	Phil Collins and Lamont Dozier	1	6	Nominated for an Academy Award for Best Original Song, and won a Golden Globe for Best Original Song
December 3	Scrooged	"Put a Little Love in Your Heart"	Annie Lennox and Al Green	Jackie DeShannon, Jimmy Holiday, Randy Myers	9	28	

== 1989 ==
Date (in US)	Movie title	Song title	Artist	Writer	US charts	UK charts	Miscellaneous
January 21	Tequila Sunrise	"Surrender to Me"	Ann Wilson and Robin Zander	Ross Vannelli, Richard Marx	6		
April 1	Chances Are	"After All"	Cher and Peter Cetera	Dean Pitchford, Tom Snow	6	84	
April 1	Rain Man	"Iko Iko"	The Belle Stars	Barbara Hawkins, Rosa Hawkins, Joan Johnson	14	98	Original peaked at #35 in the UK, re-released as a single from the soundtrack
April 8	Dream a Little Dream	"Rock On"	Michael Damian	David Essex	1		
April 15	Beaches	"Wind Beneath My Wings"	Bette Midler	Larry Henley, Jeff Silbar	1	5	
April 15	Sing	"Birthday Suit"	Johnny Kemp	Dean Pitchford, Rhett Lawrence	36		
July 1	Batman	"Batdance"	Prince	Prince	1	2	
July 1	Ghostbusters II	"On Our Own"	Bobby Brown	L.A. Reid, Babyface, Daryl Simmons	2	4	
September 2	Batman	"Partyman"	Prince	Prince	18	14	
December 2	Batman	"The Arms of Orion"	Prince and Sheena Easton	Sheena Easton	36	27	

== 1990 ==
Date (in US)	Movie title	Song title	Artist	Writer	US charts	UK charts	Miscellaneous
February 24	True Love	"Whole Wide World"	A'me Lorain	A. Roman, E. Wolff	9		
March 31	Pretty Woman	"Wild Women Do"	Natalie Cole	Greg Prestopino, Sam Lorber, Matthew Wilder	34	16	
April 21	Pretty Woman	"It Must Have Been Love"	Roxette	Per Gessle	1	3	
May 12	Teenage Mutant Ninja Turtles	"Turtle Power!"	Partners in Kryme	James Alpern, Richard Usher	13	1	
June 2	The Adventures of Ford Fairlane	"Cradle of Love"	Billy Idol	Billy Idol, David Werner	2	34	
June 23	Pretty Woman	"King of Wishful Thinking"	Go West	Peter Cox, Richard Drummie and Martin Page	8	18	
June 30	Dick Tracy	"Hanky Panky"	Madonna	Madonna, Patrick Leonard	10	2	
July 28	Young Guns II	"Blaze of Glory"	Jon Bon Jovi	Jon Bon Jovi	1	13	Nominated for an Academy Award for Best Original Song, won the Golden Globe Award for Best Original Song
August 11	Graffiti Bridge	"Thieves in the Temple"	Prince	Prince	6	7	
September 8	Ghost	"Unchained Melody" (original recording)	The Righteous Brothers	Alex North, Hy Zaret	13	1	Originally peaked at #4 in 1965, was re-released as a single after the song appeared on the soundtrack to Ghost. A re-recording of the song was also released and became a big hit in Europe
November 3	Young Guns II	"Miracle"	Jon Bon Jovi	Jon Bon Jovi	12	29	

== 1991 ==
Date (in US)	Movie title	Song title	Artist	Writer	US charts	UK charts	Miscellaneous
February 9	Graffiti Bridge	"Round and Round"	Tevin Campbell	Prince	12		
April 27	New Jack City	"I Wanna Sex You Up"	Color Me Badd	Elliot Straite, Color Me Badd	2	1	
July 6	Robin Hood: Prince of Thieves	"(Everything I Do) I Do It For You"	Bryan Adams	Bryan Adams, Michael Kamen, Robert "Mutt" Lange	1	1	Nominated for an Academy Award for Best Original Song
July 6	The Five Heartbeats	"Nights Like This"	After 7	Jesse Johnson, Keith Lewis	24		
July 20	Terminator 2: Judgment Day	"You Could Be Mine"	Guns N' Roses	Axl Rose, Izzy Stradlin	29	3	
September 7	Doc Hollywood	"The One and Only"	Chesney Hawkes	Nik Kershaw	10	1	Also appears on the soundtrack to the British film, Buddy's Song
December 14	The Addams Family	"Addams Groove"	MC Hammer	Stanley Kirk Burrell, Felton Pilate, Vic Mizzy	7	4	

== 1992 ==
Date (in US)	Movie title	Song title	Artist	Writer	US charts	UK charts	Miscellaneous
February 15	Rush	"Tears in Heaven"	Eric Clapton	Eric Clapton, Will Jennings	2	5	
February 22	Beauty and the Beast	"Beauty and the Beast"	Celine Dion and Peabo Bryson	Alan Menken (music), Howard Ashman (lyrics)	9	9	Won the Academy Award for Best Original Song and won the Golden Globe Award for Best Original Song
February 22	Fried Green Tomatoes	"What Becomes of the Brokenhearted"	Paul Young	William Weatherspoon, Paul Riser, and James Dean	22		
April 4	Wayne's World	"Bohemian Rhapsody"	Queen	Freddie Mercury	2	1	Originally peaked at #9 in the US and #1 in the UK when released in 1975, was re-released as a single after Freddie Mercury's death, and its inclusion in the soundtrack to Wayne's World
July 4	A League of Their Own	"This Used to Be My Playground"	Madonna	Madonna, Shep Pettibone	1	3	
July 25	Boomerang	"End of the Road"	Boyz II Men	Kenneth "Babyface" Edmonds, Antonio "L.A." Reid, Daryl Simmons	1	1	
August 1	Strictly Business	"You Remind Me"	Mary J. Blige	Eric Milteer	29	48	
August 1	Deep Cover	"Mr. Loverman"	Shabba Ranks and Chevelle Franklyn	Shabba Ranks, Mikey Bennett, Hopeton Lindo	40	23	
August 22	Class Act	"I Wanna Love You"	Jade	Vassal Benford, Ronald Spearman	16	13	
August 22	Boomerang	"Give U My Heart"	Babyface featuring Toni Braxton	Babyface, L.A. Reid, Daryl Simmons, Boaz Watson	29		
September 26	Boomerang	"I'd Die Without You"	P.M. Dawn	Attrell Cordes	3	30	
November 14	The Bodyguard	"I Will Always Love You"	Whitney Houston	Dolly Parton	1	1	
