= Grease (soundtrack) =

Grease: The Original Soundtrack from the Motion Picture

Soundtrack album by various artists
- Released: April 14, 1978
- Recorded: 1977–1978
- Studios: Filmways/Wally Heider Recording Studios, Los Angeles, California; United Western Studios, Los Angeles, California; Hollywood Sound Recorders, Los Angeles, California; Criteria Studios, Miami, Florida
- Genres: Rock and roll; doo-wop; pop; disco
- Length: 63:14
- Label: RSO
- Producers: Louis St. Louis; John Farrar; Barry Gibb; Albhy Galuten; Karl Richardson

Olivia Newton-John albums chronology
Olivia Newton-John's Greatest Hits (1977)	Grease: The Original Soundtrack from the Motion Picture (1978)	Totally Hot (1978)

Singles from Grease: The Original Soundtrack from the Motion Picture
- 1. "You're the One That I Want" Released: March 1978; 2. "Grease" Released: May 1978; 3. "Hopelessly Devoted to You" Released: June 1978; 4. "Summer Nights" Released: July 1978; 5. "Greased Lightnin'" Released: September 1978 (US); 6. "Sandy" Released: September 1978 (UK)

Grease: The Original Soundtrack from the Motion Picture is the original motion picture soundtrack for the 1978 film Grease. It was originally released by RSO Records and subsequently re-issued by Polydor Records between 1984 and 1991. It has sold over 30 million copies worldwide, making it one of the best-selling albums of all time, also ranking amongst the biggest selling soundtrack albums of all time. The song "You're the One That I Want" was a U.S. and UK No. 1 for stars John Travolta and Olivia Newton-John.

Besides performers John Travolta and Olivia Newton-John, the album also featured songs by rock and roll revival group Sha Na Na as well as the hit song "Grease", a tune written by Barry Gibb (of the Bee Gees) and sung by Frankie Valli (of The Four Seasons) that was an additional U.S. No. 1.

== Background ==
The soundtrack was released on April 14, 1978, two months ahead of the film's release. As with most musicals of the period, the vocal takes recorded for the album release–and in some cases the instrumental background as well–do not lock to picture but were recorded during entirely different soundtrack sessions often months prior or subsequent to the performances used for lip sync in the film.

The cover gives credit to, and prominently features, the two stars of the film—John Travolta and Olivia Newton-John—although they only appear on seven of the 24 tracks. Sha Na Na performed many of the 1950s numbers in the film, the recordings of which also appear on the soundtrack. Stockard Channing sings lead on two of the tracks; the two tracks remain her only significant contribution to recorded popular music to date. The title track is featured twice on the soundtrack and performed by Frankie Valli, who had no other connection with the film.

The entirety of the score written by Jim Jacobs and Warren Casey for the Broadway musical was included on the soundtrack and/or in the film, with the exception of two songs: "Shakin' at the High School Hop" (originally composed to open Act II of the musical) and "All Choked Up" (the song originally written into the spot where the film used "You're the One that I Want") were both left out of both the film and the soundtrack. Not all of the songs were included in the film; songs cut from the film were performed on the soundtrack by Louis St. Louis and Cidny (then Cindy) Bullens or converted to instrumentals. Songs in the musical that were not performed by Rizzo, Danny, Sandy, the Teen Angel, or Johnny Casino & the Gamblers were given to those characters or to St. Louis and Bullens; these included Sandy's original feature number "It's Raining on Prom Night" (given to Bullens and used as a jukebox background song), Marty's "Freddy, My Love" (given to Bullens), Doody's "Those Magic Changes" (given to Johnny Casino & the Gamblers), Kenickie's "Greased Lightnin'" (given to Danny), and both of the songs originally attributed to a character named Roger that was written out of the film, "Mooning" and "Rock'n'Roll Party Queen" (both given to St. Louis; "Mooning" was replaced in function in the film by the 1930s standard "Blue Moon," performed by the Gamblers). Rizzo's 11 o'clock number "There Are Worse Things I Could Do" was only kept in the film at Channing's fervent insistence, as she felt the song (and the storyline behind it) was necessary to prevent Rizzo from becoming a one-dimensional caricature.

The most successful songs from the soundtrack were written specifically for the film. They included the Billboard number-one hits "Grease", "You're the One That I Want" and the Academy Award-nominated "Hopelessly Devoted to You". In the UK, the album proved even more successful where "You're the One That I Want" and "Summer Nights" (a song carried over from the original musical) reached No.1 for nine and seven weeks respectively, while "Grease", "Hopelessly Devoted to You" and "Sandy" all became top three hits. The soundtrack album hit the top of the charts in the US during the summer of 1978, replacing The Rolling Stones' Some Girls. In the UK, it remained at the top of the charts for 13 consecutive weeks. As of 2011, "You're the One That I Want" and "Summer Nights" are still among the 20 best-selling singles of all time in the UK (at Nos. 6 and 19 respectively). "Greased Lightnin'," another carryover from the stage version, was also released as a single, reaching the top 20 in the UK but narrowly missing the top 40 in the U.S. in part because of the lyrical content not being permitted on U.S. radio.

Two of the bass players who recorded on the Grease soundtrack were members of Toto. One of these, David Hungate, also performed on Newton-John's album Totally Hot with Toto guitarist Steve Lukather. Other musicians on the soundtrack had previously worked with Elton John, Steely Dan, Bee Gees and others. The Grease album, as well as the soundtrack for the film, were recorded and mixed by David J. Holman.

The album has sold over 6.1 million copies in the U.S. in the SoundScan era (beginning 1991) in addition to the 8 million shipped in the years 1978–1984.

== Reception ==
Professional ratings
Review scores
Source	Rating
AllMusic	4.5/5 stars
Christgau's Record Guide	C+

In their review, Billboard stated that "RSO follows its record breaking Saturday Night Fever soundtrack with another apparent smash film track. The double pocket set contains 24 cuts of original Broadway material as well as new material written specifically for this contemporized version. Olivia Newton-John and John Travolta shine with their best vocal efforts, especially Newton-John on the rapidly rising single 'You're The One That I Want.'"

Cashbox noted that "the former Broadway hit sounds like a winner on vinyl, too. With great vocals from stars Olivia Newton-John and John Travolta and help from Sha-Na-Na, Frankie Valli and Peter Frampton, this 2- LP set should slide to the top of the pop chart. One hit single is already out, and more will follow."

Stephen Thomas Erlewine of AllMusic retrospectively rated the soundtrack four-and-a-half stars. He stated that "the originals hold up better than the '50s tunes" due in large part to Sha Na Na's workmanlike performances of the latter. Erlewine added however that the original songs "are so giddily enjoyable that everything works". He also said that "the sleek pop production the movie's soundtrack boasts and the cast's enthusiastic performances go a long way in making this Grease the definitive Grease." The album was nominated for Album of the Year at the 21st Annual Grammy Awards.

== Track listing ==
All tracks written by Jim Jacobs and Warren Casey, except where noted.

=== Original 1978 release ===
Side One
No.	Title	Writer(s)	Vocals	Length
1.	"Grease"	Barry Gibb	Frankie Valli	3:24
2.	"Summer Nights"		John Travolta; Olivia Newton-John	3:35
3.	"Hopelessly Devoted to You"	John Farrar	Olivia Newton-John	3:04
4.	"You're the One That I Want"	John Farrar	John Travolta; Olivia Newton-John	2:48
5.	"Sandy"	Louis St. Louis; Scott Simon	John Travolta	2:31
Total length:				15:22

Side Two
No.	Title	Writer(s)	Vocals	Length
6.	"Beauty School Dropout"		Frankie Avalon	3:59
7.	"Look at Me, I'm Sandra Dee"		Stockard Channing; Didi Conn; Dinah Manoff; Jamie Donnelly	1:40
8.	"Greased Lightnin'"		John Travolta; Jeff Conaway	3:13
9.	"It's Raining on Prom Night"		Cindy Bullens	2:51
10.	"Alone at a Drive-In Movie"		Instrumental	2:24
11.	"Blue Moon"	Richard Rodgers; Lorenz Hart	Sha-Na-Na	2:18
Total length:				16:25

Side Three
No.	Title	Writer(s)	Vocals	Length
12.	"Rock n' Roll Is Here to Stay"	David White	Sha-Na-Na	2:03
13.	"Those Magic Changes"		Sha-Na-Na	2:18
14.	"Hound Dog"	Jerry Leiber · Mike Stoller	Sha-Na-Na	1:24
15.	"Born to Hand Jive"		Sha-Na-Na	4:37
16.	"Tears on My Pillow"	Sylvester Bradford; Al Lewis	Sha-Na-Na	2:02
17.	"Mooning"		Louis St. Louis; Cindy Bullens	2:15
Total length:				14:39

Side Four
No.	Title	Writer(s)	Vocals	Length
18.	"Freddy, My Love"		Cindy Bullens	2:48
19.	"Rock n' Roll Party Queen"		Louis St. Louis	2:11
20.	"There Are Worse Things I Could Do"		Stockard Channing	2:22
21.	"Look at Me, I'm Sandra Dee" (reprise)		Olivia Newton-John	1:40
22.	"We Go Together"		John Travolta; Olivia Newton-John	3:00
23.	"Love Is a Many Splendored Thing (Instrumental)"	Sammy Fain; Paul Francis Webster	Orchestral	1:23
24.	"Grease" (reprise)	Barry Gibb	Frankie Valli	3:24
Total length:				16:38

=== CD release ===
The CD of the soundtrack has been released twice in the US. In April 1991 it was released through Polydor Records as a single disc replicating the sequence of the original 1978 RSO LP. In September 2003 it was released by PolyGram as a 2-CD digitally-remastered "Deluxe Edition" containing additional tracks. As with the LP and single-disc CD, the songs are not presented in the order replicating their appearances in the movie.

Deluxe edition bonus disc
No.	Title	Writer(s)	Vocals	Length
1.	"Grease" (Instrumental version)	Barry Gibb	Gary Brown, saxophone	3:23
2.	"Summer Nights" (Sing-a-long version)			3:34
3.	"Hopelessly Devoted to You" (Sing-a-long version)	John Farrar		3:03
4.	"You're the One That I Want" (Sing-a-long version)	John Farrar		2:32
5.	"Sandy" (Sing-a-long version)	Louis St. Louis and Scott Simon		2:30
6.	"Greased Lightnin'" (Single version)		John Travolta	3:20
7.	"Rydell Fight Song" (Previously unreleased instrumental)			0:20
8.	"Greased Up and Ready to Go" (Previously unreleased instrumental)			4:49
9.	"Grease Megamix" ("You're the One That I Want"/"Greased Lightnin'"/"Summer Nights")	John Farrar; Jim Jacobs and Warren Casey	John Travolta and Olivia Newton-John	4:49
10.	"Grease The Dream Mix" ("Grease"/"Sandy"/"Hopelessly Devoted to You")	Barry Gibb; Louis St. Louis and Scott Simon; John Farrar	Frankie Valli, John Travolta, Olivia Newton-John	3:59
11.	"Summer Nights" (Martian remix)		John Travolta and Olivia Newton-John	3:37
12.	"You're the One That I Want" (Martian remix)	John Farrar	John Travolta and Olivia Newton-John	3:25

=== 40th anniversary vinyl reissue ===
In August 2018, Polydor reissued the vinyl album to celebrate its original release in 1978. Released on 180g vinyl and mastered in half speed, it was the first time since its original release that it had used the original RSO record label in the artwork. No information was provided on who or where the record was half speed mastered.

== Performers ==
=== Vocalists ===
- Olivia Newton-John – vocals
- John Travolta – vocals
- Stockard Channing – vocals ("Look At Me, I'm Sandra Dee", "There Are Worse Things I Could Do")
- Jeff Conaway – vocals
- Barry Pearl – vocals ("Summer Nights")
- Michael Tucci – vocals ("Summer Nights")
- Kelly Ward – vocals ("Summer Nights")
- Didi Conn – vocals ("Summer Nights", "Look At Me, I'm Sandra Dee")
- Jamie Donnelly – vocals ("Summer Nights", "Look At Me, I'm Sandra Dee")
- Dinah Manoff – vocals ("Summer Nights", "Look At Me, I'm Sandra Dee")

=== Additional vocalists and musicians ===
- Frankie Valli – vocals ("Grease")
- Barry Gibb – backing vocals ("Grease")
- Frankie Avalon – vocals ("Beauty School Drop Out")
- Sha Na Na – vocals ("Blue Moon", "Rock 'n' Roll Is Here to Stay", "Those Magic Changes", "Hound Dog", "Born to Hand Jive", "Tears on My Pillow")
- Cidny Bullens – vocals ("It's Raining on Prom Night", "Mooning", "Freddy, My Love"), backing vocals
- Louis St. Louis – vocals ("Mooning", "Rock 'n' Roll Party Queen"), keyboards, arrangements
- Curt Becher, Paulette K. Brown, Beau Charles, Carol Chase, Kerry Chater, Loren Farber, John Farrar, Venetta Fields, Gerald Garrett, Jim Gilstrap, Mitch Gordon, Jim Haas, Patty Henderson, Ron Hicklin, Diana Lee, John Lehman, Maxayn Lewis, Melissa MacKay, Myrna Matthews, Marti McCall, Gene Merlino, Gene Morford, Lisa Roberts, James Gilstrap, Sally Stevens, Zedrick Turnbough, Jackie Ward, M. Ann White, Jerry Whitman – backing vocals
- The Sweet Inspirations – backing vocals ("Grease")
- John Farrar – backing vocals, guitar, arrangements
- Peter Frampton – lead guitar ("Grease")
- Dennis Budimir – guitar
- Tommy Tedesco – guitar
- Joey Murcia – guitar ("Grease")
- George Terry – guitar ("Grease") (uncertain?)
- Tim May – guitar ("Born to Hand Jive")
- Jay Graydon – guitar
- Lee Ritenour – guitar
- Dan Sawyer – guitar
- Bob Rose – guitar
- Cliff Morris – guitar
- Mike Porcaro – bass
- David Hungate – bass
- Max Bennett – bass
- Harold Cowart – bass ("Grease") (uncertain?)
- David Allen Ryan – bass
- "Wm. J. Bodine" – bass
- Dean Cortez – bass
- George Bitzer – keyboards ("Grease") (uncertain?)
- Greg Mathieson – keyboards
- Michael Lang – keyboards
- Lincoln Mayorga – keyboards
- Thomas Garvin – keyboards
- Ben Lanzarone – keyboards
- Ollie E. Brown – drums
- Cubby O'Brien – drums
- Carlos Vega – drums
- Ron Zeigler – drums ("Grease") (uncertain?)
- Ray Pizzi – saxophone ("Greased Lightnin'" and "We Go Together")
- Ernie Watts – saxophone ("Alone at a Drive-In Movie" and "There Are Worse Things I Could Do")
- Jerome Richardson – saxophone
- John Kelson, Jr. – saxophone
- Gary Brown – saxophone ("Grease (Instrumental Version)") (B-side to "Grease" single and bonus track on 2003 25th Anniversary Deluxe Edition)
- Eddie "Bongo" Brown – percussion
- Larry Bunker – percussion
- Victor Feldman – percussion
- Antoine Dearborn – percussion
- Lloyd Ulgate – trombone
- Albert Aarons – trumpet
- Robert Bryant – trumpet
- Dorothy Remsen – harp
- Gayle Levant – harp
- James Getzoff – concertmaster
- Michael Gibson – arrangements
- Ben Lanzarone – string arrangements ("Summer Nights")
- Michael Melvoin – horn and string arrangements ("Greased Lightnin'" and "Born to Hand Jive")
- Carl Fortina – session contractor
- Bob Borenstein – copyist

=== Production ===
- All selections except "Grease" arranged by: John Farrar, Michael Gibson, Louis St. Louis
- Strings on "Summer Nights" arranged by Ben Lanzarone
- Horns and Strings on "Greased Lightnin'" and "Born to Hand Jive" arranged by Michael Melvoin
- Karl Richardson – engineer ("Grease")
- Recorded at: Filmways/Wally Heider Recording Studios, Hollywood
  United Western Studios, Hollywood
  Hollywood Sound Recorders, Hollywood
- Engineered by: David J. Holman, Jay Lewis, EirBilly Joel Wangberg, Michael Carneval, Karl Richardson ("Grease")
- All selections mixed and re-mixed by David J. Holman at Filmways/Wally Heider Recording Studios, Hollywood (Except "Grease")
- Produced by: Louis St. Louis and John Farrar; Barry Gibb, Albhy Galuten and Karl Richardson ("Grease")
- Album mastered at A&M Records by Bernie Grundman
- Art direction: Glenn Ross
- Album design: Tim Bryant/George Corsillo
- Photography: Alan Pappe/Lee Gross Assoc., Inc.
- Background photos: Ron Slenzak

== Charts ==
=== Weekly charts ===
Chart (1978–79)	Peak position
Australian Albums (Kent Music Report)	1
Austrian Albums (Ö3 Austria)	1
Canada Top Albums/CDs (RPM)	1
Dutch Albums (Album Top 100)	1
French Albums (IFOP)	1
German Albums (Offizielle Top 100)	1
Italian Albums (Musica e dischi)	1
Japanese Albums (Oricon)	1
New Zealand Albums (RMNZ)	1
Norwegian Albums (VG-lista)	1
Portuguese Albums (Musica & Som)	3
Swedish Albums (Sverigetopplistan)	1
UK Albums (Official Charts)	1
US Billboard 200	1
US Cash Box Top Albums	1
Chart (1991–99)	Peak position
Australian Albums (ARIA)	1
Austrian Albums (Ö3 Austria)	10
Belgian Albums (Ultratop Flanders)	3
Belgian Albums (Ultratop Wallonia)	6
Dutch Albums (Album Top 100)	1
European Albums (Music & Media)	3
French Albums (SNEP)	3
German Albums (Offizielle Top 100)	20
Hungarian Albums (MAHASZ)	39
New Zealand Albums (RMNZ)	3
Norwegian Albums (VG-lista)	1
Swedish Albums (Sverigetopplistan)	26
UK Compilation Albums (OCC)	2
US Top Catalog Albums (Billboard)	1
Chart (2002–2022)	Peak position
Belgian Albums (Ultratop Flanders)	186
Belgian Albums (Ultratop Wallonia)	137
Danish Albums (Hitlisten)	12
Dutch Albums (Album Top 100)	73
French Albums (SNEP)	183
Norwegian Albums (VG-lista)	27
Spanish Albums (Promusicae)	29
Swiss Albums (Schweizer Hitparade)	48
UK Compilation Albums (OCC)	2
US Soundtrack Albums (Billboard)	3

=== Year-end charts ===
Chart (1978)	Position
Austrian Albums (Ö3 Austria)	5
Canada Top Albums/CDs (RPM)	4
Dutch Albums (Album Top 100)	2
German Albums (Offizielle Top 100)	12
New Zealand Albums (RMNZ)	2
Chart (1979)	Position
Austrian Albums (Ö3 Austria)	11
German Albums (Offizielle Top 100)	27
US Billboard 200	20
Chart (1991)	Position
Australian Albums (ARIA)	9
Dutch Albums (Album Top 100)	3
Chart (1998)	Position
Australian Albums (ARIA)	25
Belgian Albums (Ultratop Flanders)	57
Belgian Albums (Ultratop Wallonia)	57
French Albums (SNEP)	68

== Sales and certifications ==
Region	Certification	Certified units/sales
Australia (ARIA)	14× Platinum	1,010,000
Austria	—	70,000
Belgium (BRMA)	Gold	40,000
Brazil (Pro-Música Brasil)	Gold	100,000^{*}
Canada (Music Canada)	Diamond	1,115,000
Denmark (IFPI Danmark)	7× Platinum	140,000^{‡}
Finland	—	40,000
France (SNEP)	Platinum	1,300,000
Germany (BVMI)	5× Gold	1,750,000
Hong Kong (IFPI Hong Kong)	Platinum	20,000^{*}
Italy (FIMI) sales since 2009	Platinum	50,000^{‡}
Japan	—	442,410
Netherlands	—	1,000,000
New Zealand (RMNZ)	6× Platinum	250,000
Norway (IFPI Norway)	Platinum	250,000
Singapore	—	9,000
Singapore (RIAS) reissue	Gold	8,000
Spain (Promusicae)	3× Platinum	400,000
Sweden	—	150,000
Switzerland (IFPI Switzerland)	Gold	25,000^{^}
United Kingdom (BPI)	9× Platinum	2,700,000^{‡}
United States (RIAA)	13× Platinum	16,999,000
Summaries
Southeast Asia	—	80,000
Worldwide	—	30,000,000
^{*} Sales figures based on certification alone.^{^} Shipments figures based on certification alone.^{‡} Sales+streaming figures based on certification alone.

== See also ==
- List of best-selling albums
- List of best-selling albums by country
- List of best-selling albums in Australia
- List of best-selling albums in France
- List of best-selling albums in Germany
- List of best-selling albums in the Netherlands
- List of best-selling albums in the United Kingdom
- List of best-selling albums in the United States
- List of diamond-certified albums in Canada
