= Grease: The Dream Mix =

1990 single by John Travolta and Olivia Newton-John

Single by Frankie Valli, John Travolta and Olivia Newton-John
- B-side: "We Go Together"
- Released: March 1991
- Recorded: 1978
- Length: 3:44
- Label: Polydor
- Songwriters: Barry Gibb; John Farrar; Louis St. Louis; Scott Simon

John Travolta singles chronology
"The Grease Megamix" (1990)	"Grease: The Dream Mix" (1991)	"Two Sleepy People" (1997)

Olivia Newton-John singles chronology
"The Grease Megamix" (1990)	"Grease: The Dream Mix" (1991)	"I Need Love" (1992)

"Grease: The Dream Mix" is a song released in March 1991 to commemorate the video release of Grease. It followed the success of "The Grease Megamix" (1990). The single was credited to Frankie Valli, John Travolta and Olivia Newton-John and is a megamix of the tracks "Grease", "Sandy" and "Hopelessly Devoted to You".

The peaked inside the top 50 of the charts of Belgium, the Netherlands and the United Kingdom.

== Track listings ==
- 7-inch and cassette single
1. "Grease: The Dream Mix" (7-inch version) – 3:44
2. "We Go Together" – 3:50
3. "We Go Together" – 3:50
- CD single
1. "Grease: The Dream Mix" (7-inch version) – 3:44
2. "Grease: The Dream Mix" (12-inch version) – 7:35
3. "We Go Together" – 3:50
4. "Grease: The Dream Mix" (7-inch Original Groove) – 5:10

== Charts ==
Chart performance for "Grease: The Dream Mix"
Chart (1991)	Peak position
Belgium (Ultratop 50 Flanders)	28
Netherlands (Dutch Top 40)	14
Netherlands (Single Top 100)	11
UK Singles (OCC)	47
UK Airplay (Music Week)	38
