= The Grease Megamix =

1990 single by John Travolta and Olivia Newton-John

Single by John Travolta and Olivia Newton-John
- B-side: "Alone at the Drive-in-Movie"; "Love Is a Many Splendored Thing"
- Released: 1990
- Length: 4:52 (7-inch version); 5:52 (12-inch version); 3:57 (U.S. radio edit)
- Label: Polydor
- Songwriters: John Farrar; Jim Jacobs; Warren Casey
- Producers: Phil Harding; Ian Curnow

John Travolta and Olivia Newton-John singles chronology
"Take a Chance" (1983)	"The Grease Megamix" (1990)	"Grease: The Dream Mix" (1992)

"The Grease Megamix" is a megamix released in 1990 to commemorate the video release of Grease. The single was credited to John Travolta and Olivia Newton-John and released via Polydor Records. It was created by Phil Harding and Ian Curnow for PWL by the request of Polydor Records, who supplied copies of the original multi-track recordings. The megamix topped the charts of Australia and Spain and became a top-five hit in Denmark, Ireland, the Netherlands, Norway, and the United Kingdom.

== Reception ==
The megamix featured the three biggest hits from the Grease soundtrack: "You're the One That I Want", "Greased Lightnin'" and "Summer Nights". The song peaked at number one in Australia and remained there for five weeks in May 1991. It was the third-highest-selling single there in 1991.

== Re-release ==
"The Grease Megamix" was re-released on the 1996 compilation CD Pure Disco. To promote the compilation, Polydor issued promotional CD singles of the Megamix to US radio stations, which propelled it to number 12 in airplay. The single was not released commercially in the US, which made it ineligible to chart on the Billboard Hot 100; it did reach the top 40 on three of Billboard's radio format airplay charts.

The megamix re-emerged for the 20th Anniversary celebrations of the Grease movie in 1998. The Grease (The Remix EP) featured the megamix, a remix of "You're the One That I Want", a remix of "Summer Nights'", and the original versions of both songs.

== Track listings ==
- 7-inch and cassette single
1. "The Grease Megamix"
2. "Alone at the Drive-in-Movie" (instrumental)
- 12-inch single

A1. "The Grease Megamix"
B1. "Alone at the Drive-in-Movie" (instrumental)
B2. "Love Is a Many Splendored Thing" (instrumental)

- CD single
1. "The Grease Megamix" (7-inch version)
2. "The Grease Megamix" (12-inch version)
3. "Alone at the Drive-in-Movie" (instrumental)

== Charts ==
=== Weekly charts ===
Chart (1990–1991)	Peak position
Australia (ARIA)	1
Austria (Ö3 Austria Top 40)	26
Belgium (Ultratop 50 Flanders)	8
Denmark (IFPI)	2
Europe (Eurochart Hot 100)	10
Europe (European Hit Radio)	25
France (SNEP)	14
Germany (GfK)	42
Ireland (IRMA)	4
Israel (Israeli Singles Chart)	2
Luxembourg (Radio Luxembourg)	4
Netherlands (Dutch Top 40)	3
Netherlands (Single Top 100)	3
New Zealand (Recorded Music NZ)	7
Norway (VG-lista)	5
Portugal (AFP)	10
Spain (AFYVE)	1
Sweden (Sverigetopplistan)	35
UK Singles (Official Charts)	3
UK Airplay (Music Week)	10

Chart (1996–1997)	Peak position
Canada Top Singles (RPM)	50
Canada Adult Contemporary (RPM)	38
US Radio Songs (Billboard)	25
US Adult Pop Airplay (Billboard)	23
US Pop Airplay (Billboard)	12

=== Year-end charts ===
Chart (1991)	Position
Australia (ARIA)	3
Belgium (Ultratop)	49
Europe (Eurochart Hot 100)	30
Netherlands (Dutch Top 40)	15
Netherlands (Single Top 100)	27

Chart (1997)	Position
US Top 40/Mainstream (Billboard)	69

== Certifications ==
Region	Certification	Certified units/sales
Australia (ARIA)	Platinum	70,000^{^}
^{^} Shipments figures based on certification alone.
