= Pure Disco =

Compilation album series

Pure Disco is the name of a series of compilation CDs of disco, dance, and funk music released by the Universal Music Group under the UTV Records label.

== Albums ==
=== Pure Disco ===
1. Village People - "Y.M.C.A." (3:44)
2. Kool & the Gang - "Celebration" (3:39)
3. ABBA – "Dancing Queen" (3:46)
4. Donna Summer - "Hot Stuff" (3:48)
5. Gloria Gaynor – "I Will Survive" (3:16)
6. Barry White – "You're the First, the Last, My Everything" (3:23)
7. Teena Marie – "I Need Your Lovin'" (3:34)
8. Amii Stewart - "Knock on Wood" (3:42)
9. Alicia Bridges – "I Love the Nightlife" (3:06)
10. Imagination – "Flashback" (3:41)
11. KC and the Sunshine Band – "That's the Way (I Like It)" (3:02)
12. The Ritchie Family – "Best Disco in Town" (3:12)
13. Yvonne Elliman – "If I Can't Have You" (2:54)
14. The Gap Band – "Oops Upside Your Head (I Don't Believe You Want to Get Up and Dance)" (3:24)
15. Diana Ross – "Love Hangover" (3:45)
16. Gibson Brothers – "Cuba" (3:40)
17. Lipps Inc. – "Funkytown" (3:55)
18. Marvin Gaye – "Got to Give It Up, Pt. 1" (4:07)
19. Thelma Houston – "Don't Leave Me This Way" (3:35)
20. Donna Summer – "I Feel Love" (Rollo & Sister Bliss Monster Mix) (3:54)
21. Olivia Newton-John and John Travolta – "The Grease Megamix: You're the One That I Want/Greased Lighting/Summer Nights" (4:50)

=== Pure Disco 2 ===
1. Gloria Gaynor – "I Will Survive" Remix (4:00)
2. KC & the Sunshine Band – "(Shake, Shake, Shake) Shake Your Booty" (3:08)
3. Vicki Sue Robinson – "Turn the Beat Around" (3:26)
4. Village People – "Macho Man" (3:27)
5. Sister Sledge – "We Are Family" (3:36)
6. Irene Cara – "Flashdance...What a Feeling" (3:57)
7. Andy Gibb – "I Just Want to Be Your Everything" (3:46)
8. Carl Carlton – "Everlasting Love" (2:37)
9. Barry White – "Can't Get Enough of Your Love, Babe" (3:55)
10. The Hues Corporation – "Rock the Boat" (3:09)
11. Ohio Players – "Love Rollercoaster" (2:54)
12. Diana Ross – "Upside Down" (4:07)
13. Wild Cherry – "Play That Funky Music" (3:17)
14. Van McCoy – "The Hustle" (3:29)
15. The Love Unlimited Orchestra – "Love's Theme" (4:10)
16. ABBA – "Gimme! Gimme! Gimme! (A Man After Midnight)" (4:50)
17. Silver Convention – "Fly, Robin, Fly" (5:02)
18. Anita Ward – "Ring My Bell" (3:33)
19. The Weather Girls – "It's Raining Men" (3:33)
20. Donna Summer – "Last Dance" (3:19)
21. Diva Megamix: "Reach Out I'll Be There/Hot Stuff/I Feel Love/Love and Kisses/I Found Love (Now That)" (3:05)

=== Pure Disco 3 ===
1. Sister Sledge – “He's the Greatest Dancer” (3:38)
2. Chic – “Le Freak” (4:17)
3. Village People – “In the Navy” (3:42)
4. The Trammps – “Disco Inferno” (3:33)
5. Peaches & Herb – “Shake Your Groove Thing” (3:24)
6. Kool & the Gang – “Ladies’ Night” (3:28)
7. Gloria Gaynor – “Never Can Say Goodbye” (2:56)
8. A Taste of Honey – “Boogie Oogie Oogie” (3:37)
9. Donna Summer – “Could It Be Magic” (3:54)
10. The Miracles – “Love Machine” (2:54)
11. Silver Convention – “Get Up & Boogie” (3:58)
12. The Three Degrees – “When Will I See You Again” (2:58)
13. France Joli – “Come to Me” (4:12)
14. Patrice Rushen – “Forget Me Nots” (4:06)
15. ABBA – Lay All Your Love on Me” (4:32)
16. Sylvester – “You Make Me Feel (Mighty Real)” (3:34)
17. The Spinners – “Then Came You” (3:55)
18. Andy Gibb – “Shadow Dancing” (4:32)
19. Blondie – “Heart of Glass” (3:22)
20. The Four Seasons – “December, 1963 (Oh, What a Night)” (3:33)
21. Olivia Newton-John and John Travolta – "You're the One That I Want" Martian Remix (3:24)

== Chart performance and certifications ==
Year	Album	Chart	Peak position	RIAA certification
1996	Pure Disco	Billboard 200	83	Platinum
1997	Pure Disco 2	Billboard 200	71	Gold
1998	Pure Disco 3	Billboard 200	150	–
