= Look for a Star (song) =

Single by Garry Miles
- B-side: "Afraid of Love"
- Released: June 1960
- Genre: Pop
- Length: 2:13
- Label: Liberty
- Songwriter(s): Mark Anthony
- Producer(s): Snuff Garrett

Garry Miles singles chronology
"Keep the Hall Light Burning" (1960)	"Look for a Star" (1960)	"Dream Girl" (1960)

"Look for a Star" is a song written by Tony Hatch (published under the pseudonym of "Mark Anthony") and performed by Garry Mills for the 1960 UK horror movie Circus of Horrors. It reached No. 7 on the UK chart, No. 5 in New Zealand and No. 26 on the US chart. When the movie was released in the U.S. there were several versions of the song quickly recorded, the main one being by Buzz Cason under the pseudonym, Garry Miles (in order to capitalize on the success of Mills' UK original). Snuff Garrett produced the song and came up with the pseudonym. The strategy worked and the Garry Miles version reached No. 16 on the U.S. pop chart in 1960.

== Other charting versions ==
- Billy Vaughn and His Orchestra released an instrumental version of the song in 1960 which reached No. 13 on the Cashbox chart and No. 19 on the U.S. pop chart.
- Deane Hawley released a version of the song in 1960 which reached No. 29 on the U.S. pop chart.
- Jericho Brown (Robert Hensley) reached the No. 18 spot on the British Melody Maker chart in 1960.

== Other versions ==
- The Brook Brothers released a version of the song on their 1962 EP The Brook Brothers.
- Werner Müller and His Orchestra released an instrumental version of the song as a single in 1961, but it did not chart.
- Heinz released a version of the song on his 1964 album Tribute to Eddie.
- The Marketts released an instrumental version of the song as a single in 1964, but it did not chart.
- Tony Hatch & His Orchestra released an instrumental version of the song on their 1998 album Hatchback.
