= Garry Mills =

British singer

Garry Mills (also Gary Mills) (born 13 October 1941) is a British former pop singer.

Mills was born in West Wickham, Kent, England, the nephew of the British jazz musician and bandleader Nat Gonella. In common with a number of late 1950s singers, Mills started performing in the 2i's Coffee Bar in London, and was subsequently signed by Dick Rowe. Mills had three hits on the UK Singles Chart in the early 1960s. Released on Top Rank Records in 1960, these were "Look for a Star" (charted at No 7) and "Top Teen Baby" (No. 24). "I'll Step Down", released on Decca in 1961, charted at No. 39. In the United States, "Look for a Star" reached No. 26 on the Billboard Hot 100 in its original version.

"Look for a Star" also made the Hot 100 in versions by Deane Hawley, Billy Vaughn and Garry Miles, the latter a pseudonym for Buzz Cason. The song, composed by Mark Anthony (a pseudonym for Tony Hatch), appeared in the soundtrack to the horror film, Circus of Horrors (1960).

When performing in concert, Mills was backed by fellow Top Rank musicians the Flee-Rekkers. He also had small roles in two low profile films of the era, London Nights and Treasure Island W.C. 2.
