= Greased Lightnin' (song) =

Song from the musical Grease

- US single picture sleeve

Single by John Travolta

from the album Grease: The Original Soundtrack from the Motion Picture
- B-side: "Razzamatazz"; "Sandy"
- Released: September 1978
- Recorded: 1977
- Genre: Rock and roll
- Length: 3:13
- Label: RSO
- Songwriters: Jim Jacobs; Warren Casey
- Producer: Louis St. Louis

John Travolta singles chronology
"Sandy" (1978)	"Greased Lightnin'" (1978)	"Never Gonna Fall in Love Again" (1980)

"Greased Lightnin'" is a song from the 1971 musical Grease which was also adapted into the 1978 film of the same name. A soundtrack recording from the film version, with John Travolta on lead vocals, peaked at No. 47 on the Billboard Hot 100 in 1978.

Though the song was performed by the character Kenickie in the original stage production, John Travolta used his influence to have himself perform the song as the character Danny in the film version. Jeff Conaway, who played Kenickie in the film and Danny on Broadway, was reportedly upset with the decision.

== Synopsis ==
Kenickie, a member of the greaser gang at the center of the musical, has purchased a used car with the savings from his summer job, giving it the nickname "Greased Lightnin'". While the other greasers are skeptical of the car because it is in such poor shape, he is able to win them over with a rousing rock and roll number describing the modifications needed to transform it into a hot rod capable of arousing the ladies.

Record World said that "the beat is 50s perfect."

== Charts ==
=== Weekly charts ===
Chart (1978)	Peak position
Australia (Kent Music Report)	40
Belgium (Ultratop 50 Flanders)	5
Ireland (IRMA)	8
Netherlands (Dutch Top 40)	6
Netherlands (Single Top 100)	4
New Zealand (Recorded Music NZ)	40
UK Singles (Official Charts)	11
US Billboard Hot 100	47
US Cash Box Top 100	45

=== Year-end charts ===
Chart (1978)	Position
Belgium (Ultratop Flanders)	75
Netherlands (Dutch Top 40)	65
Netherlands (Single Top 100)	55

== Critical reception ==
STL Today described the song as "a number saluting a hot rod and all the joy it promises".
