= Screamin' Scott Simon =

American pianist (1948–2024)

Scott Simon
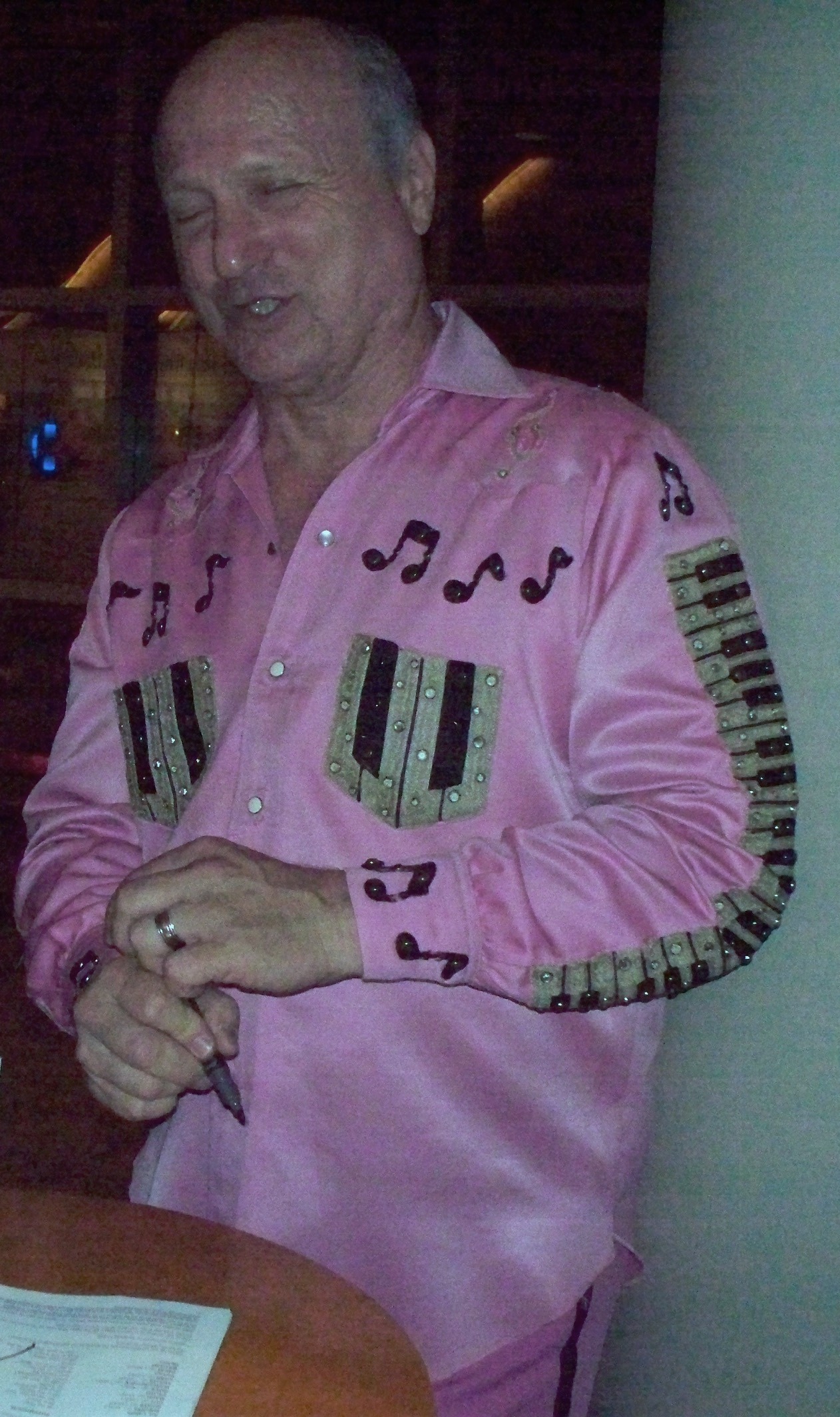
- Simon in 2009

Background information
- Also known as: Screamin' Scott Simon
- Born: Scott Simon; December 9, 1948; Kansas City, Missouri, U.S.
- Died: September 5, 2024 (aged 75) Ojai, California, U.S.
- Genres: Rock and roll
- Occupation: Pianist
- Years active: 1969–2022
- Label: Kama Sutra Records
- Formerly of: Sha Na Na (1970–2022)

Scott Jared Simon (December 9, 1948 – September 5, 2024), also known as Screamin' Scott Simon, was an American pianist known for playing in Sha Na Na from April 1970 until the band's disbandment in December 2022.

== Early life and education ==
Simon was born in Kansas City, Missouri on December 9, 1948. He graduated from Southwest High School in Kansas City, in 1966, and graduated from Columbia University with a B.A. in 1970. In college, he played piano and sang with the Royal Pythons, a band that included Chris Donald on guitar (who went on to join him in Sha Na Na in 1970), Jack Hartford on drums, and Richard Yospin on bass.

== Sha Na Na ==
Simon joined Sha Na Na in April 1970, under the name "Screamin' Scott Simon". He wrote numerous songs that have been recorded by the band and others over the years.

Sha Na Na, who are known for covering 1950s rock and roll and doo-wop, appeared as a 1950s version of themselves in the 1978 film version of Grease. In the film, he and Louis St. Louis collaborated on the song "Sandy", performed by John Travolta.

Simon continued to tour with Sha Na Na, along with founding member Jocko Marcellino, until December 5, 2022, when it was announced that Sha Na Na would no longer be touring. During his time in Sha Na Na, he played on every album, with the exception of their first album, which was released in 1969.

== Personal life and death ==
Simon and his first wife, Sarina Beges, were married from 1971 until divorcing in 1988; they had two daughters. In 2000, he married Deborah Richetta.

Simon died of sinus cancer in Ojai, California, on September 5, 2024, at the age of 75.

== Discography ==
- Sha Na Na (1971)
- The Night Is Still Young (1972)
- The Golden Age of Rock ’n’ Roll (1973)
- From the Streets of New York (live) (1973)
- Hot Sox (1974)
- Sha Na Now (1975)
- Rock 'n Roll Graffiti – Live in Japan (1975)
- Rockin' in the 1980s (1980)
- Silly Songs (1981)
- 34th & Vine (1990)
- Live in Concert (1996)
- Rock 'n Roll Dance Party (1996)
- Then He Kissed Me (1999)
- Live in Japan (2000)
- Rockin' Christmas (2002)
- One More Saturday Night (2006)
