= Jamie Donnelly =

American actress

- Occupations: Actress, singer
- Years active: 1974–present
- Spouse: Stephen Foreman
- Children: 2

Jamie Donnelly is an American actress and singer known for her portrayal of Jan in the musical, and later film, Grease, along with Magenta in The Rocky Horror Show during its run in the Roxy Theatre in Los Angeles.

== Career ==
Donnelly is best known as Jan, one of the Pink Ladies from the musical and film Grease. While her film co-stars John Travolta and Jeff Conaway had appeared in the stage version of Grease as different characters, and Frankie Avalon reprised his film character on stage, Donnelly was the only person to reprise her stage character on film; she was 31 years old by the time the film was released and had to dye her graying hair to continue to fit the part.

In the early 1970s, she was in the United States premiere of The Rocky Horror Show starring as Magenta and the Usherette. She appeared on stage at the Roxy Theatre in Los Angeles with Tim Curry and Meat Loaf in 1974, when the show opened. She is featured on the original Roxy cast recording in her role, singing the opening song "Science Fiction/Double Feature". She went with most of the Roxy cast to reprise her roles on Broadway in 1975, but did not reprise the role in the film adaptation, as the British production's original Magenta, Patricia Quinn, reprised the role instead. Several years later, she was called to read for Grease.

During her stage career, she appeared in a musical version of Tarzan.

In 2017, she appeared as herself on the TV game show revival of To Tell The Truth. One of the 3 contestants was the real "pinkest lady in the world." After the real person was revealed, Jamie revealed herself to instead be one of the Pink Ladies in Grease.

== Personal life ==
Donnelly is an acting coach who lives in La Cañada Flintridge, California, with her husband Stephen Foreman, a novelist. She has two adult children.

== Filmography ==
Year	Title	Role	Notes
1974	The Six Million Dollar Man	Linda	Episode: "The Pal-Mir Escort"
1974	Police Woman	Monica	Episode: "Smack"
1975	The Dream Makers	Sally	TV movie
1976	Barnaby Jones	Monica Gideon	Episode: "Silent Vendetta"
1976	Police Woman	Jan	Episode: "Tender Soldier"
1978	Grease	Jan	
1998	Slappy and the Stinkers	Aquarium Information Woman	
1998	Can't Hardly Wait	Teacher	
2002	Family Affair	Mrs. McWhirter	4 episodes
2006	The Legend of Lucy Keyes	Gretchen Caswell	
2008	The Naked Brothers Band	Mrs. Claus	Episode: "Pole Bears: Part 1"
2009	Monk	Judge Santa Croce	Episode: "Mr. Monk Takes the Stand"
2009	Pet Peeves	Dot	Short film
2010	Cyrus	Pastor	
2010	Salvation Insurance	Heavenly Voice (voice)	Short film
2014	Ray Donovan	Peggy Shaugnessy	3 episodes
2015	Black Mass	Mrs. Cody	
2015	Guns for Hire	Waitress	
2015–16	All Downhill from Here	Dr. Kildare	3 episodes
2016	The Waitress	Mrs. Decker	Short film
2017	Cargo	Violet	
