= Circus of Horrors =

1960 film by Sidney Hayers

- Theatrical release poster
- Directed by: Sidney Hayers
- Screenplay by: George Baxt
- Produced by: Leslie Parkyn; Julian Wintle
- Starring: Anton Diffring; Erika Remberg; Yvonne Monlaur
- Cinematography: Douglas Slocombe
- Edited by: Reginald Mills
- Music by: Franz Reizenstein; Muir Mathieson
- Production company: Lynx Films Limited
- Distributed by: Anglo-Amalgamated
- Release date: 8 April 1960 (London)
- Running time: 87 minutes
- Country: United Kingdom
- Language: English

Circus of Horrors is a 1960 British horror film directed by Sidney Hayers and starring Anton Diffring, Yvonne Monlaur, Erika Remberg, Kenneth Griffith, Jane Hylton, Conrad Phillips, Yvonne Romain, and Donald Pleasence. It follows a deranged plastic surgeon who changes his identity after botching an operation, and later comes to gain control of a circus that he uses as a front for his surgical exploits. The original screenplay was written by American screenwriter George Baxt. It was released in the United Kingdom on 8 April 1960 and in the United States on 11 May 1960 by American International Pictures as a double feature with the Roger Corman film A Bucket of Blood. In some areas in 1960, Circus was shown on a double bill with The Angry Red Planet (1960)..

== Plot ==
In 1947 England, plastic surgeon Dr. Rossiter is wanted by police after performing a botched operation on socialite Evelyn Morley. However, believing himself to have brilliant abilities as a surgeon, he and his assistants, Martin and Angela, evade capture and escape to France. To avoid capture, Rossiter changes his name to Dr. Schüler. Schüler sees a girl scarred in the recent war, Nicole, and befriends her father, a circus owner named Vanet. Schüler performs a surgical procedure on Nicole to restore her face. Schüler then suggests to Vanet that they become partners; Vanet will sign the circus over to Schüler, who will pay all the bills, but they will have a private document to show it still belongs to Vanet. Vanet realises that the doctor is on the run from something or someone, and wants a place to hide out in, but is glad to repay him in any way he can, and also hopes to save his circus. Drunk from his celebration, Vanet tries to dance with the bear that is part of his act, but drops a bottle which injures the animal, who starts to maul him. He screams instructions to the surgeon about how to control the bear; at first Schüler runs to help, then realises his opportunity, and leaves Vanet to die. With the assistance of Martin and Angela, Schüler begins to recruit performers, seeking out lowly and disfigured criminals whom he offers to transform with surgery should they join him. In Paris, he encounters prostitute Elissa Caro robbing and killing a man in an alleyway. Schüler offers to transform Elissa's face – which is marked by a large scar – and provide her a new identity as a performer in his circus. She reluctantly agrees.

A decade later, Schüler's circus is a prominent act throughout Europe, touted for its aesthetically beautiful performers. When its members choose to leave, however, they meet a series of mysterious accidents. One performer, Magda von Meck, informs Schüler she wants to leave. During her farewell performance in Berlin, Magda is killed during a knife-throwing act, deliberately orchestrated by Schüler. Magda's death motivates a jealous Elissa to regain top-billing in the circus act. Later, Schüler is approached by Melina, a woman whose face has been disfigured by acid, and agrees to perform surgery on her with the intent of turning her into his new star performer. He soon falls in love with her, and intends to marry her.

Nicole, still performing in the circus, is met by Inspector Arthur Ames, posing as a journalist investigating the deaths that have occurred within the troupe. When he gains Nicole's trust, she confesses that, during her childhood, she underwent an operation from Schüler, whom she believes to be her uncle. Meanwhile, Elissa deduces that Schüler's real name is Rossiter, and attempts to blackmail him with this knowledge into restoring her top-billing in the circus. In retaliation, Schüler sets a python loose in Elissa's caravan, but she remains unwavering. Shortly after, Schüler has Elissa killed during a rope-swinging act, causing her to fall to her death.

When Schüler is attacked by one of his gorillas, he instructs Angela and Martin to perform his own procedures on him. Later, Evelyn Morley, now married to Edward Finsbury, visits the circus. When she meets Schüler, whose face is half-bandaged, she faints. Angela and Martin insist they go into hiding, believing that Evelyn has recognized Schüler, but he insists the show must go on. During a lion taming act, Melina is mauled to death, traumatizing Schüler. As the guests flee in the melee, Evelyn insists to Nicole and Inspector Ames that Schüler and Rossiter are in fact the same man. Meanwhile, a deranged Schüler attacks Angela and Martin in their caravan, stabbing Angela to death. Martin eludes him, and sets a gorilla loose to attack Schüler. Police arrive, and Martin recounts the murders Schüler has committed. Meanwhile, Schüler escapes the gorilla, and attacks Inspector Ames and Nicole, before leading police on a chase through the circus grounds. He is stopped by Evelyn, who deliberately strikes him with her car. As he lay dying, Schüler's last word is "Melina."

== Cast ==
- Anton Diffring as Dr. Bernard Schüler/Rossiter
- Erika Remberg as Elissa Caro
- Yvonne Monlaur as Nicole Vanet
  - Carla Challoner as Young Nicole Vanet
- Donald Pleasence as Vanet
- Jane Hylton as Angela
- Kenneth Griffith as Martin
- Conrad Phillips as Inspector Arthur Ames
- Jack Gwillim as Superintendent Andrews
- Vanda Hudson as Magda von Meck
- Yvonne Romain as Melina
- Colette Wilde as Evelyn Morley Finsbury
- William Mervyn as Doctor Morley
- John Merivale as Edward Finsbury
- Peter Swanwick as German Police Inspector Knopf
- Walter Gotell as Baron Von Gruber (unaccredited)

== Production ==
=== Development ===
After the success of Horrors of the Black Museum (1959), Anglo-Amalgamated and AIP tried to duplicate its success with this film.

They wanted to do a horror film set in a circus. Writer George Baxt came up with the idea of a circus run by a plastic surgeon who turns criminals into beautiful people. Baxt says he had to do several drafts of the script before AIP were satisfied.

=== Filming ===
The film was shot at Beaconsfield Film Studios, with location filming on Clapham Common in London and in Old Amersham, Buckinghamshire. Billy Smart's Circus provided the big top and some of its performers appeared as extras.

=== Soundtrack ===
The score was provided between Franz Reizenstein and Muir Mathieson. Douglas Slocombe was the cinematographer.

The song "Look for a Star", written by Tony Hatch as "Mark Anthony", originated in this movie. In the United States, there were four versions issued at the same time that charted:

- Garry Mills (the original film version) (Imperial 5674) reached #26
- Garry Miles (a pseudonym used by Buzz Cason and chosen due to its similarity to Garry Mills' name)
- Deane Hawley (Dore 554) reached #29
- Billy Vaughn (the sole instrumental version) (Dot 16106) reached #19

In the UK Garry Mills recorded a studio version of the song (Top Rank JAR-336) that made No. 7 in the British chart.

== Release ==
The film opened theatrically in London on 8 April 1960.

In the United States, the film was distributed by American International Pictures as a double feature with A Bucket of Blood (1959), opening in Los Angeles in May 1960.

== Reception ==
=== Critical ===
The Monthly Film Bulletin wrote: "A plot that only a very simple-minded sadist would take seriously sustains an anthology of gory killings and maimings – by lion, bear and gorilla, careless surgery, bombing, stabbing, motor accident and falling from a height. Bandages are torn from unhealed wounds, whips slashed at snarling beasts, the bare thighs of the mad doctor's lovely victims spreadeagled across the screen. Occasional humour comes from Kenneth Griffiths' ultra-sinister manner, and there are a few genuine circus high-wire shots that seem considerably more thrilling than the monotonous massacre below, but the film's main concern is with satisfying those who find imaginary mutilation entertaining."

Variety wrote: "No artistic gem, Circus is the type of picture that lends itself to saturation campaigns and bookings. With proper selling, there's no reason why this entry can't mop up in the secondary market – especially drive-ins. For horror and sex are parlayed, and they're a proven b.o combo. ... Sidney Hayers' direction at times overdoes the macabre touch."

The Radio Times Guide to Films gave the film 3/5 stars, writing: "Definitely a film to make your flesh creep, this nifty British horror is more in keeping with the gimmicky style of Roger Corman or William Castle than your average Hammer. Anton Diffring is perfectly cast as an incompetent plastic surgeon who takes refuge under Donald Pleasence's big top after the knife slips once too often. Director Sidney Hayers makes superb use of the circus locale, dreaming up wonderfully grotesque ways of bumping off the outcasts that Diffring has remodelled when they try to escape his barbarous regime."

Leslie Halliwell said: "Stark horror comic; quite professionally made, but content-wise a crude concoction of sex and sadism."

=== Box office ===
Kine Weekly called it the most popular horror film at the British box office in 1960. The film became a surprise hit in the United States.

== Home media ==
Anchor Bay Entertainment released Circus of Horrors on DVD in January 2002. In September 2019, Scream Factory released a Blu-ray edition of the film.

== Legacy ==
In his book A Heritage of Horror (1971, the film critic David Pirie considered Circus of Horrors to be the third entry in what he calls Anglo-Amalgamated's "Sadian trilogy" – the previous films in this conceptual trilogy being Horrors of the Black Museum and Peeping Tom – : three films that focus on sadism, cruelty and violence (with sexual undertones) as opposed to the supernatural horror of the Hammer films in the same era.

The movie has become a cult favorite.

== Sources ==
- Cason, Buzz (2004). Living the Rock 'n Roll Dream: The Adventures of Buzz Cason. Milwaukee, Wisconsin: Hal Leonard Corporation. ISBN 978-0-634-06672-6.
- Hamilton, John (2012). X-Cert: The British Independent Horror Film 1951–70. Bristol, England: Hemlock Books. ISBN 978-0-955-77745-5.
- Smith, Gary A. (2009). The American International Pictures Video Guide. Jefferson, North Carolina: McFarland. ISBN 978-0-786-43309-4.
- Valley, Richard (1992). "Three Ring Circus". Scarlet Street. Vol. 1, no. 6. pp. 30–32.
