= Summer Nights (Grease song) =

Song from the musical Grease

- Side-A label of 1978 Australian vinyl single

Single by John Travolta and Olivia Newton-John

from the album Grease: The Original Soundtrack from the Motion Picture
- B-side: "Rock and Roll Party Queen" (performed by Louis St. Louis)
- Released: July 1978 (US); August 25, 1978 (UK)
- Genre: Pop; musical theatre
- Length: 3:35
- Label: RSO
- Songwriters: Jim Jacobs; Warren Casey
- Producer: Louis St. Louis

Olivia Newton-John single singles chronology
"Hopelessly Devoted to You" (1978)	"Summer Nights" (1978)	"A Little More Love" (1978)

John Travolta singles chronology
"You're the One That I Want" (1978)	"Summer Nights" (1978)	"Sandy" (1978)

"Summer Nights" is a popular song from the musical Grease. Written by Jim Jacobs and Warren Casey, its best-known version was recorded by American actor and singer John Travolta and Anglo-Australian singer, songwriter and actress Olivia Newton-John for the 1978 big-screen adaptation of the musical, and released as a single that same year. It was released in August 1978 as the fourth single from the movie's soundtrack album and became a massive hit worldwide during the summer of 1978. Parts of the song were introduced to a new audience when it was re-released in the 1990s as part of a megamix of several songs from the movie version.

== Background ==
In the movie version of Grease, Travolta and Newton-John played the lead roles of Danny Zuko and Sandy Olsson.

The song's genesis stems from a summertime love affair between Danny and Sandy, which had ended upon Sandy's revelation that she was moving back to Australia with her family; however, Sandy soon learns that her family is staying in the United States and subsequently enrolls at Rydell High School, where Danny is also a student. In the original stage version, Sandy Dumbrowski, who like many other characters in the play is a Catholic of Polish descent, originally attends parochial school. On the other hand, Danny lied to her and claimed to attend Lake Forest Academy, a prestigious real-life private school in Chicago. Sandy's parents' decision to pull her out of Catholic school and put her in public Rydell High exposes Danny's subterfuge.

Separately and unknown to each other, both Danny and Sandy meet with their respective group of friends and share their perspectives of their summertime fling. Danny, the leader of a greaser gang known as "The T-Birds" (the "Burger Palace Boys" in the stage show), brags about the physical aspects of the relationship; Sandy remarks to the schoolgirl clique "The Pink Ladies" about her emotional attachment to Danny. The resulting conversations are played out through the song.

Of the cast members, only Travolta and Newton-John provided vocals for the previous single from the soundtrack, "You're The One That I Want", but other members of the cast contributed backing and cameo lead vocals to "Summer Nights". The only vocal contributions on the soundtrack from Kelly Ward (Putzie) and Michael Tucci (Sonny) are their single questions in this song (Sonny also had no solo lines in the musical; the two songs from the musical by Putzie's stage counterpart were cut from the film).

"Summer Nights" was originally written for the stage show's transition to Broadway. The original Chicago version of the musical (staged only once since the 1970s) had a different song, "Foster Beach," at that point.

Record World said "The effect is era-perfect and its unique sound should drive it up summer playlists."

== Chart performance ==
"Summer Nights" reached No. 5 on the US Billboard Hot 100, and spent two weeks at No. 3 on Cash Box Top 100. The song was an even bigger hit in the UK, spending seven weeks at No. 1. Combined with an earlier nine-week run with "You're the One That I Want," the Travolta-Newton-John duet team spent 16 weeks at No. 1 during 1978 in the UK.

In 2004, the song finished at #70 in AFI's 100 Years...100 Songs survey of top tunes in American cinema.

In 2010, Billboard ranked it No. 9 on their "Best Summer Songs of All Time" list.

== Charts ==
=== Weekly charts ===
Chart (1978)	Peak position
Australia (Kent Music Report)	6
Canada Top Singles (RPM)	3
Canada Adult Contemporary (RPM)	3
Finland (Suomen virallinen lista)	14
Ireland (IRMA)	1
Israel (Israeli Singles Chart)	1
Italy (Musica e dischi)	4
New Zealand (RIANZ)	3
South Africa (Springbok Radio)	9
UK Singles (OCC)	1
US Billboard Hot 100	5
US Adult Contemporary (Billboard)	21
US Cash Box Top 100	3
West Germany (GfK)	4
Switzerland (Schweizer Hitparade)	7
Austria (Ö3 Austria Top 40)	1
Netherlands (Single Top 100)	1
Belgium (Ultratop 50 Flanders)	1
Sweden (Sverigetopplistan)	3
Norway (VG-lista)	2
Quebec (ADISQ)	4

Chart (2022)	Peak position
U.S. Digital Song Sales (Billboard)	46
UK Singles Downloads (Official Charts)	54

=== Year-end charts ===
Chart (1978)	Rank
Australia (Kent Music Report)	62
Canada (RPM)	42
New Zealand (RIANZ)	47
UK Singles (OCC)	3
US Billboard Hot 100	69
US Cash Box Top 100	41

=== Decade-end charts ===
Chart (1970–79)	Rank
UK Singles (OCC)	7

== Sales and certifications ==
Region	Certification	Certified units/sales
Canada (Music Canada)	Gold	75,000^{^}
Denmark (IFPI Danmark)	Gold	45,000^{‡}
France (SNEP)	Gold	500,000^{*}
New Zealand (RMNZ)	Platinum	30,000^{‡}
United Kingdom (BPI)	Platinum	1,640,000
United States (RIAA)	Gold	1,000,000^{^}
^{*} Sales figures based on certification alone.^{^} Shipments figures based on certification alone.^{‡} Sales+streaming figures based on certification alone.

== Cover versions ==
- Angélica María and Raúl Vale recorded a Spanish-language cover titled "Noches de verano", which reached #1 in Mexico in 1979.
- A version of the song appeared in "Say Yes to the Dress", episode 7 of Season 3 of the Netflix Original series Fuller House, sung by DJ Tanner (Candace Cameron-Bure) and Steve Hale (Scott Weinger) with Fernando Guerrero (Juan Pablo Di Pace), Jimmy Gibbler (Adam Hagenbuch), Stephanie Tanner (Jodie Sweetin), Kimmy Gibbler (Andrea Barber) and Romona Gibbler (Soni Nicole Bringas) singing background vocals.
- A version of the song appeared in "Yes/No", episode 10 of Season 3 of the television series Glee, sung by Sam Evans (Chord Overstreet) and Mercedes Jones (Amber Riley), with various New Directions singing background vocals and solos from Finn (Cory Monteith), Rory (Damian McGinty), Puck (Mark Salling), Kurt (Chris Colfer), Sugar (Vanessa Lengies), Tina (Jenna Ushkowitz) and Santana (Naya Rivera).
- Punk band The Vandals parodied the song on their 1990 album Fear of a Punk Planet, featuring Moon Zappa for female vocals.
