= Hopelessly Devoted to You =

1978 single by Olivia Newton-John

- Artwork for UK vinyl single

Single by Olivia Newton-John

from the album Grease: The Original Soundtrack from the Motion Picture
- B-side: "Love Is a Many-Splendored Thing"
- Released: June 1978
- Recorded: 1977
- Studio: United/Western Studio
- Genre: Country pop
- Length: 3:05
- Label: RSO
- Songwriter: John Farrar
- Producer: John Farrar

Olivia Newton-John singles chronology
"You're the One That I Want" (1978)	"Hopelessly Devoted to You" (1978)	"Summer Nights" (1978)

Film clip
- "Hopelessly Devoted to You" by Olivia Newton-John from Grease (1978) on YouTube

Audio
- "Hopelessly Devoted to You" by Olivia Newton-John on YouTube

Australian release
- Side A of the Australian single

"Hopelessly Devoted to You" is a torch song recorded by British-Australian singer, songwriter and actress Olivia Newton-John for Grease: The Original Soundtrack from the Motion Picture (1978). It was written and produced by John Farrar and originally performed by Newton-John in the film version of the musical Grease (1978). The song reached number three on the US Billboard Hot 100 and number seven on the Adult Contemporary chart. On the country chart, "Hopelessly Devoted to You" peaked at number 20 and was her first top 20 country hit in two years. The song was released in Australia in August 1978 and peaked at number two. Newton-John performed the song at the 21st Grammy Awards in 1979.

The song received an Oscar nomination as Best Original Song, losing to "Last Dance" from Thank God It's Friday at the 51st Academy Awards. Lyrically, the song is about Olivia's character in the film, Australian newcomer Sandy Olsson, singing about how she keeps loving John Travolta's character Danny Zuko, leader of a gang of greaser boys, despite him brushing her off in favor of his friends.

The song was not part of the original musical production (and was replaced with the 1950s standard "Since I Don't Have You" for the 1994 revival), but it was added to the score for the 2007 revival and was included in the 2016 Grease: Live performance, sung by Julianne Hough.

== Background ==
Halfway through shooting Grease, Newton-John's contractually-entitled vocal solo had yet to be written. John Farrar, Newton-John's personal producer, wrote the song and submitted it to the film's production team. They were reluctant, but eventually approved it; shooting and recording took place after the rest of the film had been completed.

In June 2004, Farrar recalled writing the song: "I spent the longest period writing the lyrics of any song I've ever written. Every thesaurus and every rhyming dictionary I had, just trying to really make it work properly".

== Critical reception ==
Upon its release, Record World named it "a '50s-inspired love ballad with the production sound of the '70s." Billboard commented that "Newton-John's vocal shines on this pretty ballad taken from the Grease soundtrack. The production is string laden, romantic and catchy." A reviewer from Cash Box said that the single "has a wide-ranging appeal. Serenading pedal steel and rhythm guitars, easy beat, strings and Olivia's bright and emotional singing make this gentle track well-suited to Top 40, MOR and country formats."

== Charts ==
=== Weekly charts ===
Chart (1978)	Peak position
Australia (Kent Music Report)	2
Belgium (Ultratop 50 Flanders)	1
Canada Top Singles (RPM)	1
Canada Adult Contemporary (RPM)	2
Canada Country Singles (RPM)	14
Finland (Suomen virallinen lista)	16
Ireland (IRMA)	1
Israel (Israeli Singles Chart)	28
Netherlands (Dutch Top 40)	1
Netherlands (Single Top 100)	1
New Zealand (Recorded Music NZ)	6
UK Singles (Official Charts)	2
US Billboard Hot 100	3
US Adult Contemporary (Billboard)	7
US Hot Country Songs (Billboard)	20
US Cash Box Top 100	3
Quebec (ADISQ)	2

Chart (2022)	Peak position
Canada Digital Song Sales (Billboard)	20
Australia (ARIA)	52
US Digital Song Sales (Billboard)	5
UK Singles Downloads (Official Charts)	16

=== Year-end charts ===
Chart (1978)	Rank
Australia (Kent Music Report)	36
Canada Top Singles (RPM)	12
New Zealand (RIANZ)	33
UK Singles (OCC)	34
US Billboard Hot 100	35

== Certifications ==
Region	Certification	Certified units/sales
Canada (Music Canada)	Gold	75,000^{^}
Denmark (IFPI Danmark)	Gold	45,000^{‡}
United States (RIAA)	Platinum	1,000,000^{‡}
New Zealand (RMNZ)	Platinum	30,000^{‡}
^{^} Shipments figures based on certification alone.^{‡} Sales+streaming figures based on certification alone.

== Sonia version ==
"Hopelessly Devoted to You"

Single by Sonia
- B-side: "The Anthem Medley"
- Released: 18 July 1994
- Length: 2:58
- Label: Cockney; BMG
- Songwriter: John Farrar
- Producer: Mark Cyrus

Sonia singles chronology
"Better the Devil You Know" (1993)	"Hopelessly Devoted to You" (1994)	"Wake Up Everybody" (1995)

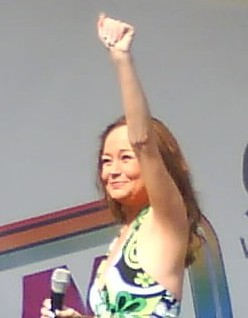
Sonia (pictured in 2008) covered the song in 1994.

In 1994, English singer Sonia took over the role of Sandy in a West End production of Grease, replacing Debbie Gibson. In conjunction, she released a cover version of the song. The single was released in July 1994 by labels Cockney and BMG as a non-album single. It has a double A-side released as a B-side "The Anthem Medley". On the 12-inch single, "The Anthem Medley" was released as the A-side and "Hopelessly Devoted to You" as the B-side. The music video for Sonia's version of "Hopelessly Devoted to You" features Sonia walking through an old city and singing. The music video for "The Anthem Medley" features Sonia dancing and singing in a nightclub. The single become her first not to reach top forty in the United Kingdom, where it peaked at number sixty-one.

=== Critical reception ===
Alan Jones from Music Week gave Sonia's version of "Hopelessly Devoted to You" three out of five, naming it "a straightforward reading".

=== Formats and track listings ===
- CD single
1. "Hopelessly Devoted to You" – 2:58
2. "The Anthem Medley" – 4:24
3. "The Anthem Medley" (club mix) – 7:04
4. "The Anthem Medley" (extended mix) – 6:24
- 7-inch single
1. "Hopelessly Devoted to You" – 2:58
2. "The Anthem Medley" – 4:24
- 12-inch single
1. "The Anthem Medley" (club mix) – 7:04
2. "The Anthem Medley" (extended mix) – 6:24
3. "Hopelessly Devoted to You" – 2:58

=== Charts ===
Chart (1994)	Peak position
UK Singles (OCC)	61
