= Sandy (Grease song) =

Song from the 1978 film Grease

Single by John Travolta

from the album Grease: The Original Soundtrack from the Motion Picture
- Released: September 29, 1978
- Length: 2:31
- Label: Midsong International/Polydor
- Songwriters: Louis St. Louis; Scott Simon
- Producer: John Farrar

John Travolta singles chronology
| "Summer Nights" (1978) | "Sandy" (1978) | "Greased Lightnin'" (1978) |

"Sandy" is a song from the 1978 film Grease, written by Louis St. Louis and Screamin' Scott Simon (of Sha Na Na), and performed by John Travolta, in character as Danny Zuko. It was released as a single in several countries, giving Travolta a no. 2 hit in the UK.

== Synopsis ==
"Sandy" was one of the songs written specifically for the film that was not in the original musical, which instead had a song named "Alone at a Drive-In Movie" at that point in the story. (Beginning with the 2003 stage production, some productions of the musical now use "Sandy" as it was in the film.) The song is a lament from Danny, a member of the T-Birds gang, who has been abandoned at the drive-in movie after making sexual advances towards his girlfriend, Sandy, in his car. He wishes to see her at their school, but the pressure of being a member of the T-Birds has apparently made it impossible to maintain their relationship. He holds out hope that some day, after high school, the two can eventually reunite without those pressures. It was described by Variety as "Danny's lovesick ode to his wholesome chick".

The song, being St. Louis's and Simon's only direct songwriting contribution to the film, uses a somewhat anachronistic style, and is performed in the manner of a late 1970s ballad with a rhythm section, string and piano accompaniment. Sha Na Na had declined an approach to perform in an off-Broadway production of Grease, but were again approached when the film was being made, and agreed. Olivia Newton-John had brought songs to the film written by her writing producer John Farrar, prompting Travolta to request a song of his own, so St. Louis and Simon wrote "Sandy" as a result, only a week before the scene in which it was performed was filmed.

== Single ==
"Sandy" was released as a single in the United Kingdom in 1978 by Midsong International/Polydor (the record label to which Travolta had been signed as a solo artist, as opposed to RSO Records, who released the Grease soundtrack album). In the UK, the single reached number 2 on the UK Singles Chart, spending 15 weeks on the chart. It was kept off the top spot by another single from the Grease soundtrack, "Summer Nights".

The B-side of the UK single was "Can't Let You Go" on some UK releases, and "Rainbows" on others. It was also released as a single in many other European countries, Australia, Japan, and Peru, with several different B-sides, including "All Strung Out On You", "Can't Let You Go", and in the US as the B-side to "Greased Lightnin'".

== Charts ==
Chart performance for "Sandy"
| Chart (1978–1979) | Peak position |
|---|---|
| Austria (Ö3 Austria Top 40) | 24 |
| Belgium (Ultratop 50 Flanders) | 7 |
| Germany (GfK) | 26 |
| Ireland (IRMA) | 1 |
| Netherlands (Dutch Top 40) | 6 |
| Netherlands (Single Top 100) | 5 |
| UK Singles (Official Charts) | 2 |
