= Louis St. Louis =

American musical artist (1942–2021)

- Born: May 26, 1942; Detroit, Michigan, United States
- Died: March 26, 2021 (aged 78) Englewood, New Jersey, United States
- Genres: Film and Broadway
- Occupations: Songwriter; singer; music arranger; conductor

Louis St. Louis (May 26, 1942 – March 26, 2021) was an American songwriter, music arranger and singer, famous for songs written for Grease, particularly the song "Sandy" (co-written with Screamin' Scott Simon), which was a hit in the United Kingdom, peaking at number 2 on the UK Singles chart, and for John Travolta and performing "Rock 'n' Roll Party Queen" and "Mooning" (songs originally from the musical, where they were sung by a character named Roger that was cut from the film) with Cidny (then Cindy) Bullens on the soundtrack.

St. Louis was born in Detroit, Michigan, on May 26, 1942. He died March 26, 2021, at the Actors Fund Home in Englewood, New Jersey.

== Works ==
- Soon (1971) – vocal arrangements/music director
- Over Here! (1974) – vocal and dance arrangements/music director
- The Wild Party (1975) – additional music for Nadine's dance
- Truckload (1975) – composer
- Grease (1978) – creative music consultant and music adapter
  - Composer "Sandy"
  - Performer: "Mooning" and "Rock 'n' Roll Party Queen"
- The Fan (1981) – additional show songs
- Grease 2 (1982) – composer
- All the Right Moves (1983) – composer (song "Hold Me Close To You")
- Ironweed (1987) – as Piano Man
- Smokey Joe's Cafe (1995) – composer, arranged songs, conductor
- Jesus Christ Superstar (2008 production) – arranger
- Joker's Game (2011 China production) – composer, music director
