= Grease (film) =

1978 musical romantic comedy film by Randal Kleiser

- Theatrical release poster
- Directed by: Randal Kleiser
- Screenplay by: Bronté Woodard
- Adaptation by: Allan Carr
- Based on: Grease by: Jim Jacobs; Warren Casey
- Produced by: Robert Stigwood; Allan Carr
- Starring: John Travolta; Olivia Newton-John; Stockard Channing; Jeff Conaway; Eve Arden; Frankie Avalon; Joan Blondell; Edd Byrnes; Sid Caesar; Alice Ghostley; Dody Goodman; Sha Na Na
- Cinematography: Bill Butler
- Edited by: John F. Burnett
- Music by: Michael Gibson
- Production companies: Allan Carr Enterprises; Stigwood Group
- Distributed by: Paramount Pictures
- Release date: June 16, 1978
- Running time: 110 minutes
- Country: United States
- Language: English
- Budget: $6 million
- Box office: $396.3 million

Grease is a 1978 American musical romantic comedy film directed by Randal Kleiser (in his feature directorial debut) from a screenplay by Bronté Woodard and an adaptation by co-producer Allan Carr. The movie is based on the 1971 stage musical of the same name by Jim Jacobs and Warren Casey. The plot follows a greaser, Danny Zuko (John Travolta), and Sandy Olsson (Olivia Newton-John), an Australian transfer student, through their summer romance and its aftermath.

Grease was released in the United States on June 16, 1978, by Paramount Pictures and Geocorographed by the legendary Paul Sutherland with all his dancing ability on show throughout. The film was successful both critically and commercially, becoming the highest-grossing film of 1978 and the highest-grossing musical film at the time. Its soundtrack album ended 1978 as the second-best-selling album of the year in the United States, only behind the soundtrack of the 1977 film Saturday Night Fever, which also starred Travolta. In addition, the song from the Grease soundtrack, "Hopelessly Devoted to You" was nominated for an Academy Award for Best Original Song at the 51st Academy Awards. The film also received five nominations at the 36th Golden Globe Awards, including for Best Motion Picture – Musical or Comedy and two for Best Original Song, for "Grease" and "You're the One that I Want". In 2020, Grease was selected for preservation in the United States National Film Registry by the Library of Congress as being "culturally, historically, or aesthetically significant".

A sequel, Grease 2, was released on June 11, 1982, starring Maxwell Caulfield and Michelle Pfeiffer as a newer class of greasers. Few of the original cast members reprised their roles, and the film was critically panned. In 2023, a short-lived prequel television series, Grease: Rise of the Pink Ladies, debuted on Paramount+, lasting for only one season.

== Plot ==
During the summer of 1958, greaser Danny Zuko and straitlaced Australian girl Sandy Olsson fall in love at the beach. As Sandy prepares to return home, she worries that she will never see Danny again, but he comforts her by saying that the summer is "only the beginning" for them.

On the first day of his senior year at Rydell High School, Danny reconnects with the members of his greaser gang the T-Birds: Sonny, Putzie, Doody, and his best friend Kenickie. Sandy arrives at Rydell and is introduced to girls' gang The Pink Ladies—Marty, Jan and leader Betty Rizzo—by mutual friend Frenchy. At lunch, Danny and Sandy each separately describe their summer, unaware of the other's presence until Sandy mentions Danny's name, which the Pink Ladies recognize.

At a pep rally, Sandy, now a cheerleader, flirts with Tom, a football player. Kenickie arrives in "Greased Lightnin'", a heavily used car he plans on restoring in order to drag race it at Thunder Road. Rizzo and the Pink Ladies surprise Sandy by reuniting her with a shocked Danny. Sandy is thrilled, but Danny makes fun of her to maintain his tough image, upsetting her. Frenchy invites her to a sleepover with the other Pink Ladies that night to make her feel better.

At the sleepover, Rizzo makes fun of Sandy's good-girl image, and Frenchy announces she is dropping out of Rydell to go to beauty school. The T-Birds crash the party, and Rizzo leaves with Kenickie to have sex in Greased Lightnin' at a nearby make-out spot. While the couple is there, rival greasers Leo and Cha-Cha interrupt them.

Danny motivates the T-Birds to work on the car by saying it will win them both girls and races. Later, he sees Sandy on a date with Tom and tries to apologize for his attitude at the pep rally, but she is unconvinced. Danny tries several sports in order to impress Sandy, eventually succeeding at track and field. Sandy, bored with Tom, agrees to be Danny's date to an upcoming dance at which the television show National Bandstand will do a live broadcast from the Rydell gym. Rizzo and Kenickie break up after a fight. After a disastrous beauty class, Frenchy reluctantly decides to return to Rydell to complete her high school education.

At the dance, Rizzo and Kenickie bring Leo and Cha-Cha as their respective dates out of spite. In a ribald dance contest that ends with the T-Birds mooning the cameras, Danny begins the contest with Sandy before Sonny pushes Sandy off the floor and Cha-Cha cuts in. Danny and Cha-Cha win as Sandy storms off.

To make it up to her, Danny takes Sandy to a drive-in movie and asks her to wear his ring. She accepts, but when he tries to make out with her, she flees the drive-in, leaving Danny hurt. Meanwhile, Rizzo fears that she may be pregnant, and tells Marty. When word reaches Kenickie, he offers to help, but she denies that he is the father.

At Thunder Road, Kenickie is injured when his head collides with his own car door, leaving him concussed. Danny takes his place behind the wheel and beats Leo in the race. Sandy decides to change her image and asks Frenchy for help.

At Rydell's graduation carnival, Rizzo discovers that she is not pregnant, and she and Kenickie get back together. Danny shocks the T-Birds by becoming a letterman, and Sandy shocks everyone with a new leather, "greaser"-style outfit. She and Danny reconcile and the whole gang vows to "always be together". Danny and Sandy drive off into the sky while their friends wave goodbye.

== Cast ==
=== Principal cast ===
Protagonists

- John Travolta as Danny Zuko
- Olivia Newton-John as Sandy Olsson

T-Birds

- Jeff Conaway as Kenickie
- Barry Pearl as Doody
- Michael Tucci as Sonny LaTierri
- Kelly Ward as Putzie

Pink Ladies

- Stockard Channing as Betty Rizzo
- Didi Conn as Frenchy
- Jamie Donnelly as Jan
- Dinah Manoff as Marty Maraschino

=== Secondary cast ===
Students

- Eddie Deezen as Eugene Felsnic
- Susan Buckner as Patty Simcox
- Lorenzo Lamas as Tom Chisum
- Dennis Cleveland Stewart as Balmudo
- Annette Charles as "Cha-Cha" DiGregorio

School staff

- Eve Arden as Principal McGee
- Dody Goodman as Blanche Hodel
- Sid Caesar as Coach Calhoun
- Alice Ghostley as Mrs. Murdock
- Darrell Zwerling as Mr. Lynch
- Dick Patterson as Mr. Rudie
- Fannie Flagg as Nurse Wilkins

Others

- Joan Blondell as Vi
- Frankie Avalon as Teen Angel
- Edd Byrnes as Vince Fontaine
- Sha Na Na as Johnny Casino & The Gamblers
- Ellen Travolta as a Frosty Palace waitress

== Production ==
The film rights to the musical Grease were originally acquired by producer Steve Krantz in 1974, who planned to make it into an animated feature to be directed by Robert Taylor. Krantz commented, "[A]s a spoof of the 1950's which doesn't take itself too seriously, it is, I'm convinced, a property that lends itself best to the cartoon film form." However, Krantz's option expired after two years, after which producers Robert Stigwood and Allan Carr purchased the rights in order to make the musical into a live-action film.

The director, Randal Kleiser, took numerous liberties with the original source material, most notably moving the setting from an urban Chicago setting (based on William Howard Taft High School), as the original musical had been, to a more suburban locale, reflecting his own teenage years at Radnor High School in the suburbs of Philadelphia. The writer Warren Casey was said to have based the high school on Gorton High School in Yonkers, New York. He had little control over the musical aspects of the film; his choice of theme song, a composition by Charles Fox and Paul Williams, was overruled when Robert Stigwood and Allan Carr commissioned a song from Stigwood's client Barry Gibb at the last minute.

=== Casting ===
John Travolta had previously worked with Stigwood on Saturday Night Fever, recorded the top-10 hit "Let Her In" in 1976, and appeared as Doody in a touring production of the stage version of Grease. As part of a three-picture deal with Stigwood, Travolta was given the lead role after Henry Winkler (then starring as Arthur "Fonzie" Fonzarelli in Paramount's TV series Happy Days) turned down the role for fear of becoming typecast as a greaser character. (Winkler would later regret the decision.) Director Randal Kleiser had never directed a theatrical feature before this but had directed Travolta in the 1976 telefilm The Boy in the Plastic Bubble; Kleiser helped Travolta maintain focus as he grieved the death of Diana Hyland (his girlfriend at the time and his on-screen mother in Bubble).

Before Newton-John was hired, Allan Carr was considering numerous names such as Carrie Fisher, Ann-Margret, Deborah Raffin, Susan Dey and Marie Osmond for the lead role. Fisher, who had recently finished Star Wars, was ultimately rejected because neither Stigwood nor Carr knew if she could sing. Osmond almost took the role before she realized the extent to which the character transformed into a rebel; she turned it down to instead star in Goin' Coconuts. Carr eventually chose Newton-John after a chance encounter at a soireé hosted by Helen Reddy. Newton-John had done little acting; before this film she had only two film credits, both of which predated her singing breakthrough (1965's Funny Things Happen Down Under and the little-seen 1970 film Toomorrow), and she requested a screen test prior to accepting the role. She thought that she was not going to be cast, for she was 28 years old. She agreed to a reduced asking price in exchange for star billing and the ability to rewrite the script, which included changing her character's origin to an Australian immigrant (to avoid having to simulate an American accent) and making her less passive. In a case of life imitating art, Newton-John's own musical career would undergo a transformation similar to that of the Sandy Olsson character; her next album after Grease, the provocatively titled Totally Hot, featured a much more sexual and pop-oriented approach, with Newton-John appearing on the album cover in all-leather attire and teased hair similar to those her character affects late in Grease.

Lorna Luft (who would later be cast in Grease 2) and Lucie Arnaz both auditioned for the part of Rizzo, but a talent client of Carr, Stockard Channing, was cast, several years after her last major film role and debut in The Fortune. At 33 she was the oldest cast member to play a high school student, and Kleiser made her and the other actors playing students take a "crow's feet test" to see whether they could pass for younger in close-ups. Softer focus was used on some of the older actors' faces. Channing lobbied heavily to keep the climactic song "There Are Worse Things I Could Do" in the score over Carr's objections.

Elvis Presley was considered for the role of The Teen Angel but died before production. Marie Osmond's brother and duet partner Donny Osmond was another potential Teen Angel before Avalon was cast, as was Frankie Valli, who had been given the choice of either singing the theme or appearing as the Teen Angel (he chose the former, believing the theme to be a better song and more likely hit). Fabian was noted as the inspiration for the role in the musical's script notes, but he and Allan Carr had fallen out after Carr's brief attempt at managing Fabian's stage act in 1974, as Carr determined Fabian's talent was limited to headlining a lounge act. Fabian stated in 2025 that he had been offered the role but had to decline it because he was overseas when the scene was to be filmed. The role would revive Avalon's career on the nostalgia circuit, with Valli noting that both Frankies benefited from their appearances despite "Beauty School Dropout" not being released as a single.

Jeff Conaway, like Travolta, had previously appeared in the stage version of Grease; he had played Danny Zuko during the show's run on Broadway. He did not get to perform Kenickie's featured number "Greased Lightnin'" due to Travolta's influence and desire to have that song for himself. Jamie Donnelly reprised her role as Jan from the Broadway show, the only cast member to do so; as her hair had begun to gray by this point, she had to dye her hair to resemble her stage character.

Lorenzo Lamas was a last-minute replacement for Steven Ford, who developed stage fright shortly before filming and backed out, and Mark Fidrych, who ran into conflicts with his full-time career as a baseball player. His role contained no spoken dialogue and required Lamas to bleach his hair to avoid looking like one of the T-Birds.

The adult film star Harry Reems was originally signed to play Coach Calhoun; however, executives at Paramount rejected the idea, concerned that his reputation as a porn star would hinder box office returns in the Southern United States, and producers cast Sid Caesar instead. Caesar was one of several veterans of 1950s television (Eve Arden, Frankie Avalon, Joan Blondell, Edd Byrnes, Alice Ghostley, Dody Goodman) to be cast in supporting roles; Paul Lynde was considered for the role Arden ultimately filled, with a scene conceived for Lynde that would have had him in a Carmen Miranda outfit. Coincidentally, Frankie Avalon and Randal Kleiser had both appeared in 1966's Fireball 500, the latter as an extra.

=== Filming locations ===
The opening beach scene was shot at Malibu's Leo Carrillo State Beach, making explicit reference to From Here to Eternity. The exterior Rydell scenes, including the front parking lot scenes, the auto shop, the "Summer Nights" bleachers number, Rizzo's "There Are Worse Things I Can Do" number, the basketball, baseball, and track segments, and the interior of the gymnastics gym, were shot at Venice High School in Venice, California, during the summer of 1977. The Rydell interiors, including the high school dance, were filmed at Huntington Park High School. The sleepover was shot at a private house in East Hollywood. The Paramount Pictures studio lot was the location of the scenes that involve Frosty Palace and the musical numbers "Greased Lightnin'" and "Beauty School Dropout." The drive-in movie scenes were shot at the Burbank Pickwick Drive-In (it was closed and torn down in 1989 and a shopping center took its place). The race was filmed at the Los Angeles River, between the First and Seventh Street Bridges, where many other films have been shot. The final scene where the carnival took place used John Marshall High School in Los Feliz. Furthermore, owing to budget cuts, a short scene was filmed at Hazard Park in Los Angeles.

=== Post-production ===
Scenes inside the Frosty Palace contain obvious blurring of various Coca-Cola signs. Prior to the film's release, the producer, Allan Carr, had made a product placement deal with Coca-Cola's main competitor Pepsi (for example, a Pepsi logo can be seen in the animated opening sequence, created by John David Wilson at Fine Arts Films). When Carr saw the footage of the scene with Coca-Cola products and signage, he ordered director Randal Kleiser to either reshoot the scene with Pepsi products or remove the Coca-Cola logos from the scene. As reshoots were deemed too expensive and time-consuming, optical mattes were used to cover up or blur out the Coca-Cola references. The 'blurring' covered up trademarked menu signage and a large wall poster, but a red cooler with the logo could not be sufficiently altered so was left unchanged. According to Kleiser, "We just had to hope that Pepsi wouldn't complain. They didn't."

Because of an editing error, a closing scene in which Danny and Sandy kiss was removed from the finished print and lost before its theatrical release. The scene was preserved only in black-and-white; Kleiser attempted to have the existing footage colorized and restored to the film for the film's re-release in 1998 but was dissatisfied with the results. The scene is included as an extra on the 40th anniversary home video release, and Kleiser hopes to make another attempt at colorizing the footage that is effective enough for the footage to be inserted into the film as he originally intended by the time the film's 50th anniversary comes in 2028.

== Soundtrack ==
The soundtrack album ended 1978 as the second-best-selling album of the year in the United States, exceeded only by another soundtrack album, from the film Saturday Night Fever, which also starred Travolta. The song "Hopelessly Devoted to You" was nominated for an Academy Award for Best Music – Original Song. The song "You're the One That I Want" was released as a single prior to the film's release and became an immediate chart-topper, despite not being in the stage show or having been seen in the film at that time. Additionally, the dance number to "You're the One That I Want" was nominated for TV Land's award for "Movie Dance Sequence You Reenacted in Your Living Room" in 2008. In the United Kingdom, the two Travolta/Newton-John duets, "You're the One That I Want" and "Summer Nights", were both number one hits and as of 2018 were still among the 30 best-selling singles of all time (at Nos. 5 and 28, respectively). The film's title song was also a number-one hit single for Frankie Valli.

The song "Look at Me, I'm Sandra Dee" refers to Sal Mineo in the original stage version. Mineo was stabbed to death a year before filming, so the line was changed to refer to Elvis Presley instead. The references to Troy Donahue, Doris Day, Rock Hudson and Annette Funicello are from the original stage version. Coincidentally, this scene as well as the scene before and the scene after it were filmed on August 16, 1977, the date of Presley's death.

Some of the songs were not present in the film; songs that appear in the film but not in the soundtrack are "La Bamba" by Ritchie Valens, "Whole Lotta Shakin' Goin' On" by Jerry Lee Lewis, "Alma Mater," "Alma Mater Parody," and "Rydell Fight Song." "Alone at a Drive-in Movie (Instrumental)," "Mooning," and "Freddy My Love" are not present in the film, although all three are listed in the end credits in addition to being on the soundtrack. (Both "Mooning" and "Rock'n'Roll Party Queen," the latter of which was played in the film as background music, were written in the musical for a character named Roger who was written out of the film, replaced by the non-singing Putzie. In general, the songs in the stage musical that were performed by characters other than Danny, Rizzo, Sandy, Johnny Casino, or the Teen Angel were either taken out of the film or given to other characters, including Marty Maraschino's number "Freddy My Love", Kenickie's "Greased Lightnin'", and Doody's "Those Magic Changes".) Two songs from the musical, "Shakin' at the High School Hop" and "All Choked Up", were left off both the film and the soundtrack.

The songs appear in the film in the following order:

1. "Love Is a Many-Splendored Thing"
2. "Grease"
3. "Alma Mater"
4. "Summer Nights" – Danny, Sandy, Pink Ladies and T-Birds
5. "Rydell Fight Song" – Rydell Marching Band
6. "Look at Me, I'm Sandra Dee" – Rizzo and Pink Ladies
7. "Hopelessly Devoted to You" – Sandy
8. "Greased Lightnin'" – Danny and T-Birds
9. "La Bamba"
10. "It's Raining on Prom Night"
11. "Whole Lotta Shakin' Goin' On"
12. "Beauty School Dropout" – Teen Angel and Female Angels
13. "Rock n' Roll Party Queen"
14. "Rock and Roll Is Here to Stay"
15. "Those Magic Changes" – Johnny Casino and the Gamblers; Danny sings along onscreen
16. "Tears on My Pillow" – Johnny Casino and the Gamblers
17. "Hound Dog" – Johnny Casino and the Gamblers
18. "Born to Hand Jive" – Johnny Casino and the Gamblers
19. "Blue Moon" – Johnny Casino and the Gamblers
20. "Sandy" – Danny
21. "There Are Worse Things I Could Do" – Rizzo
22. "Look at Me, I'm Sandra Dee" (Reprise) – Sandy
23. "Alma Mater Parody" (Instrumental)
24. "You're the One That I Want" – Danny, Sandy, Pink Ladies, and T-Birds
25. "We Go Together" – Cast
26. "Grease" (Reprise)

== Release ==
Grease was originally released in the United States on June 16, 1978, and was an immediate box-office success. In its opening weekend, the film grossed $8,941,717 in 862 theaters in the United States and Canada, ranking at number 2 (behind Jaws 2) at the box office for the weekend and with the all-time opening weekend records. Despite losing the opening weekend, it topped the box office the following weekend with a gross of $7,867,000 and set a record gross in its first 19 days, with $40,272,000. After 66 days, it had grossed $100 million to become Paramount's second-highest-grossing film, behind The Godfather, and ended its initial run with a gross of $132,472,560, which made it the highest-grossing film in 1978.

In the United States and globally, it became the highest-grossing musical ever at the time, eclipsing the 13-year-old record held by The Sound of Music, with a worldwide gross of $341 million.

In the United Kingdom, it opened with a record $2.2 million in its first eight days. It went on to become the highest-grossing film in the UK, with a gross of £14.7 million.

It was re-released May 18, 1979, in 1,248 theatres in the United States and Canada (except for the New York City area, where it opened a week later), Paramount's biggest ever saturation release at the time, grossing $4.5 million in its opening weekend. The film played for four weeks and was then paired with the PG-rated version of Saturday Night Fever in late June. During the reissue, it overtook The Godfather as Paramount Pictures' highest-grossing film. It was re-released in March 1998 for its 20th anniversary, where it grossed a further $28 million in the United States and Canada.

It remained the highest-grossing live-action musical until 2012 when it was overtaken by Les Misérables, and it remained the US champion until 2017 when it was surpassed by Beauty and the Beast, and again in 2024 with Wicked, the first installment of that musical's two-part adaptation. Discounting inflation, Grease is now the seventh-highest-grossing live-action musical worldwide.

A further re-issue for its 40th anniversary in 2018 grossed $1 million. To date, Grease has grossed $189,969,103 domestically and $206.2 million internationally, totaling $396 million worldwide. Another re-issue took place in select AMC Theatres locations in August 2022 to honor Olivia Newton-John following her death earlier that month, with $1 per sold ticket and the proceeds going to breast cancer research, through a donation by AMC Cares. Similarly, in the UK, selected Merlin Cinemas venues also reissued the film during August, but partnered with Macmillan Cancer Support, with a contribution of £1 per ticket sold.

== Reception ==
Grease is considered by many as one of the best films of 1978. Metacritic, which uses a weighted average, assigned the film a score of 70 out of 100, based on 15 critics, indicating "generally favorable" reviews. On Rotten Tomatoes, the film holds a 65% approval rating based on 158 reviews. The website's critical consensus reads, "Word is, Grease stars an electrifying John Travolta while serving up some '50s kitsch in a frenetic adaptation that isn't always the one that we want."

First reviews were mixed. The New York Times' Vincent Canby called the film "terrific fun", describing it as a "contemporary fantasy about a 1950s teen-age musical—a larger, funnier, wittier and more imaginative-than-Hollywood movie with a life that is all its own". Canby compared Grease to Don't Knock the Rock (1956) and Beach Party (1963), calling it a "multimillion-dollar evocation" of these "B-picture quickies". Gene Siskel gave the film three stars out of four, calling it "exciting only when John Travolta is on the screen" but still recommending it to viewers, adding, "Four of its musical numbers are genuine showstoppers that should bring applause." Variety praised the "zesty choreography and very excellent new plus revived music", and thought Travolta and Newton-John "play together quite well."

Charles Champlin of the Los Angeles Times was negative, writing, "I didn't see Grease onstage, but on the testimony of this strident, cluttered, uninvolving and unattractive movie, it is the '50s—maybe the last innocent decade allowed to us—played back through a grotesquely distorting '70s consciousness." Gary Arnold of The Washington Post also panned the film, writing, "Despite the obvious attempts to recall bits from Stanley Donen musicals or Elvis Presley musicals or Frankie-and-Annette musicals, the spirit is closer to the New Tastelessness exemplified by Ken Russell, minus Russell's slick visual style [...] I've never seen an uglier large-scale musical." David Ansen of Newsweek wrote, "Too often, Grease is simply mediocre, full of broad high-school humor, flat dramatic scenes and lethargic pacing. Fortunately, there's nothing flat about John Travolta [;...] when he's on screen you can't watch anyone else."

In a 1998 retrospective review, Roger Ebert gave the film 3 out of 4 stars, calling it "an average musical, pleasant and upbeat and plastic." He found John Travolta's Elvis Presley–inspired performance to be the highlight, but felt that Grease "sees the material as silly camp." In 2018, Peter Bradshaw from The Guardian gave it 5 out of 5 stars, saying "It's still a sugar-rush of a film." Grease was voted the best musical ever on Channel 4's 100 greatest musicals in 2004. The film was ranked number 21 on Entertainment Weekly's list of the 50 Best High School Movies.

In recent years, the film has been reassessed for what some critics have deemed as discriminatory and problematic content. Bryn Gelbart from Business Insider wrote that the film had not aged well, describing it as preaching an "unfortunate message" with aspects that could be "considered regressive by today's standards". Kristen Baldwin of Entertainment Weekly wrote that the ending of the film was "decidedly un-feminist". Katy Hall of The Sydney Morning Herald said that the film was "deeply problematic" but also "ahead of its time." Joe Hildebrand of News.com.au defended the film, saying that it "isn't horribly sexist and offensive, it's just that its characters say and do horrible, sexist and offensive things [...] In short, they're a lot like, well, people." A 2020 showing of film on the BBC drew complaints from viewers and renewed criticism. Olivia Newton-John responded to the criticism, calling the comments "silly" and saying that the film isn't meant "to be taken so seriously."

=== Awards and nominations ===
Award	Category	Nominee(s)	Result	Ref.
Academy Awards	Best Original Song	"Hopelessly Devoted to You"; Music and Lyrics by John Farrar	Nominated	
Golden Globe Awards	Best Motion Picture – Musical or Comedy		Nominated	
Golden Globe Awards	Best Actor in a Motion Picture – Musical or Comedy	John Travolta	Nominated	
Golden Globe Awards	Best Actress in a Motion Picture – Musical or Comedy	Olivia Newton-John	Nominated	
Golden Globe Awards	Best Original Song – Motion Picture	"Grease"; Music and Lyrics by Barry Gibb	Nominated	
Golden Globe Awards	Best Original Song – Motion Picture	"You're the One That I Want"; Music and Lyrics by John Farrar	Nominated	
Golden Screen Awards			Won	
Jupiter Awards	Best International Actor	John Travolta	Nominated	
Jupiter Awards	Best International Actress	Olivia Newton-John	Nominated	
National Film Preservation Board	National Film Registry		Inducted	
People's Choice Awards	Favorite Overall Motion Picture		Won	
People's Choice Awards	Favorite Musical Motion Picture		Won	
People's Choice Awards	Favorite Male Musical Performer	John Travolta	Nominated	
People's Choice Awards	Favorite Female Musical Performer	Olivia Newton-John	Won	
People's Choice Awards	Favorite Motion Picture Supporting Actress	Stockard Channing	Won	
Satellite Awards	Best Classic DVD		Nominated	
TV Land Awards	Movie Dance Sequence You Reenacted in Your Living Room	"You're the One That I Want"	Nominated	

=== American Film Institute recognition ===
- AFI's 100 Years...100 Passions—No. 97
- AFI's 100 Years...100 Songs—No. 70 for "Summer Nights"
- AFI's Greatest Movie Musicals—No. 20

== Home media ==
Grease was released in the US on VHS by Paramount Home Video in 1979, 1982, 1989, 1992 and 1994; the last VHS release was on June 23, 1998, and was titled the 20th Anniversary Edition following a theatrical re-release that March. This one was THX certified and consisted of widescreen and pan and scan fullscreen versions.

On September 24, 2002, it was released on DVD for the first time. On September 19, 2006, it was re-released on DVD as the Rockin' Rydell Edition, which came with a black Rydell High T-Bird jacket cover, a white Rydell "R" letterman's sweater cover, or the Target-exclusive Pink Ladies cover. It was released on Blu-ray Disc on May 5, 2009.

On March 12, 2013, Grease and Grease 2 were packaged together in a double feature DVD set from Warner Home Video.

In connection with the film's 40th anniversary, Paramount released Grease on 4K Ultra HD Blu-ray, Blu-ray and DVD on April 24, 2018.

== Sing-along version ==
On July 8, 2010, a sing-along version of Grease was released to selected theaters around the U.S. The film was shown for two weekends only; additional cities lobbied by fans from the Paramount official website started a week later and screened for one weekend. CBS aired this version of the film on June 7, 2020.

== Legacy ==
=== Sequel ===
Grease 2 (1982) stars Maxwell Caulfield and Michelle Pfeiffer. While several of the Rydell High staff characters reprise their roles, the sequel focused on the latest class of graduating seniors, hence most of the principals from Grease did not appear. Patricia Birch, the original film's choreographer, directed the sequel. The original musical's cocreator Jim Jacobs, who was not involved in the making of Grease 2, has disowned the film.

=== Prequel ===
In March 2019, it was announced that a prequel, called Summer Lovin', was in development from Paramount Players. The project would be a joint-production collaboration with Temple Hill Productions and Picturestart. John August signed on to serve as screenwriter. As of August 2024, there has been no further word on the project.

=== Television ===
On August 17, 2009, a television series inspired by the film premiered in Venezuela. The series was produced and directed by Vladimir Perez. The show explores and expands on the characters and story from the film.

On January 31, 2016, Fox aired a live television-adapted special of the musical, using components from both the 1978 film and the original Broadway show. Starring Julianne Hough, Aaron Tveit, and Vanessa Hudgens, the adaptation received positive reviews, especially for Hudgens, and ten Emmy nominations.

On October 15, 2019, it was announced that a musical television series based on Grease, titled Grease: Rydell High, was given a straight-to-series order by HBO Max. Annabel Oakes is set to write the pilot episode and act as executive producer for the series. In 2020, the series' title was changed to Grease: Rise of the Pink Ladies. It premiered on Paramount+ April 6, 2023. Filming began in January 2022, and the series' cast was announced at the end of the month. Rise of the Pink Ladies released ten episodes in spring 2023 before the series was cancelled and withdrawn from public availability in June.
