= Show tune =

Genre of music

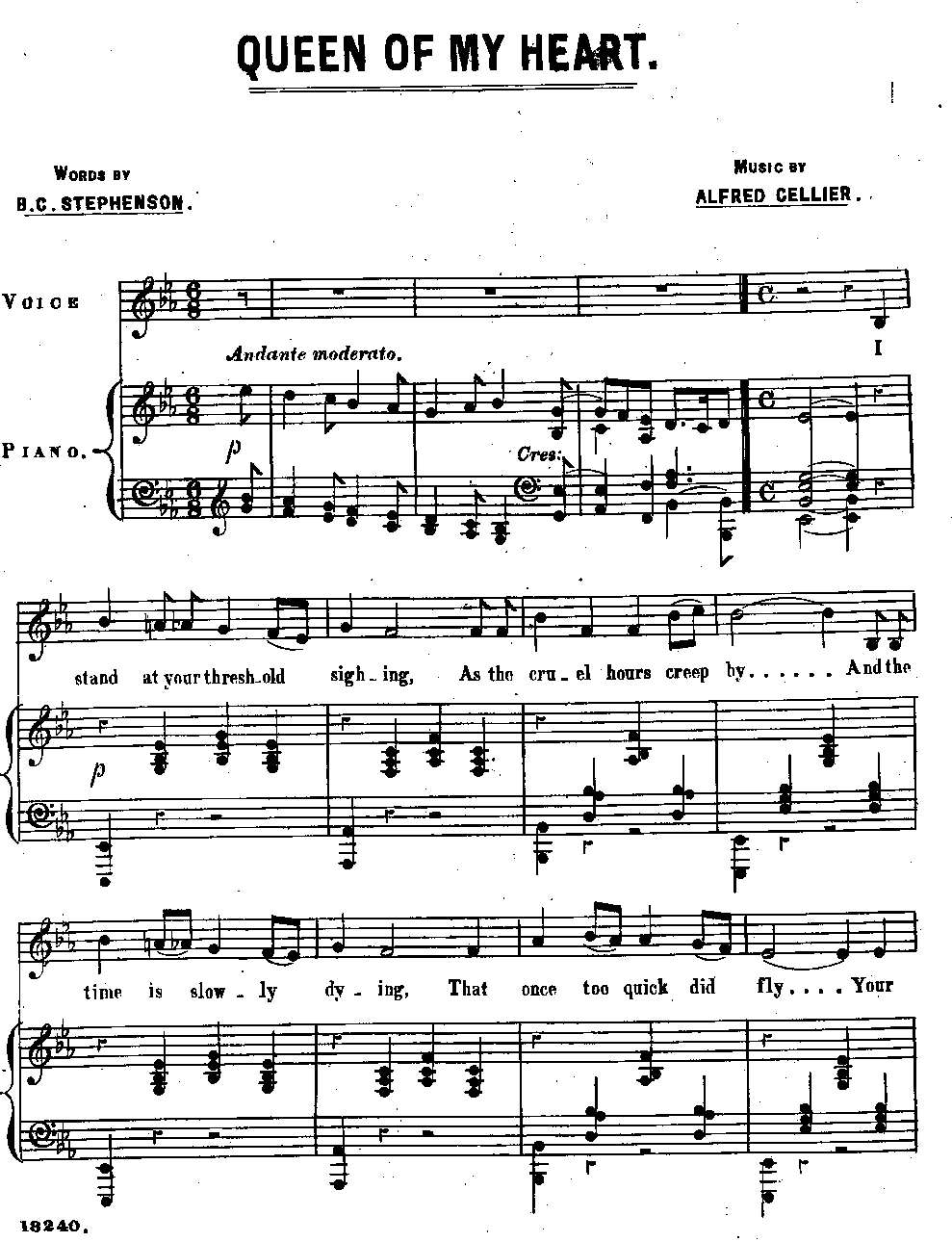
"Queen of my Heart", the hit song of Dorothy, was very popular as a parlour ballad.

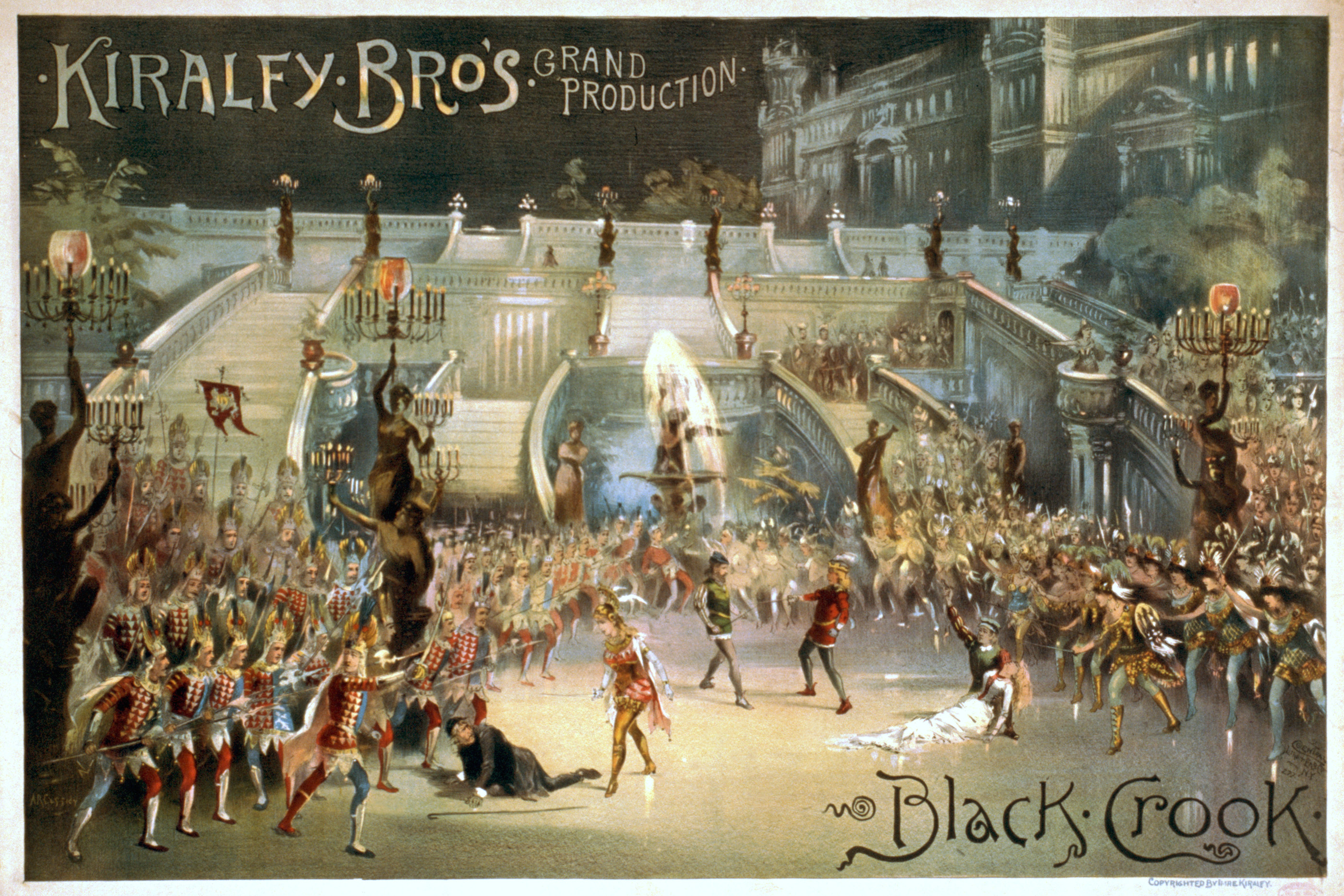
The Black Crook (1866), considered by some historians to be the first musical

A show tune is a song originally written as part of the score of a work of musical theatre or musical film, especially if the piece in question has become a standard, more or less detached in most people's minds from the original context.

Though show tunes vary in style, they do tend to share common characteristics—they usually fit the context of a story being told in the original musical, they are useful in enhancing and heightening choice moments. A particularly common form of show tune is the "I Want" song, which composer Stephen Schwartz noted as being particularly likely to have a lifespan outside the show that spawned it.

Show tunes were a major venue for popular music before the rock and roll and television era; most of the hits of such songwriters as Jerome Kern, Cole Porter, and George Gershwin came from their shows. (Even into the television and rock era, a few stage musicals managed to turn their show tunes into major pop music hits, sometimes aided by film adaptations and exposure through variety shows.) Although show tunes no longer have such a major role in popular music as they did in their heyday, they remain somewhat popular, especially among niche audiences (such as theatre kids). Show tunes make up a disproportionate part of the songs in most variations of the Great American Songbook.

The reverse phenomenon, when already popular songs are used to form the basis of a stage production, is known as a jukebox musical.

== Examples ==
Particular musicals that have yielded popular “show tunes” include:

- Richard Rodgers and Oscar Hammerstein's Oklahoma!, Carousel, South Pacific, The King and I, Flower Drum Song, The Sound of Music
- Jerome Kern and Hammerstein's Show Boat
- Rudolf Friml, Herbert Stothart, Otto Harbach and Hammerstein's Rose-Marie
- Rodgers and Lorenz Hart's Pal Joey and Babes in Arms
- Irving Berlin's Annie Get Your Gun, As Thousands Cheer, Call Me Madam
- Cole Porter's Anything Goes, Kiss Me, Kate, Can-Can
- George and Ira Gershwin's Girl Crazy, Oh, Kay!
- Jerry Bock and Sheldon Harnick's Fiddler on the Roof
- Alan Jay Lerner and Frederick Loewe's Brigadoon, Paint Your Wagon, My Fair Lady, Gigi, Camelot
- Meredith Willson's The Music Man
- Frank Loesser's Guys and Dolls, How to Succeed in Business Without Really Trying
- Leonard Bernstein and Stephen Sondheim's West Side Story
- Jule Styne's Gypsy, Funny Girl, Gentleman Prefer Blondes
- Leslie Bricusse and Anthony Newley's Stop the World – I Want to Get Off, The Roar of the Greasepaint – The Smell of the Crowd
- Lin-Manuel Miranda's Hamilton
- Bricusse, Frank Wildhorn and Steve Cuden's Jekyll & Hyde
- Jerry Herman's Milk and Honey, Hello, Dolly!, Mame, Dear World, Mack and Mabel, La Cage aux Folles
- Stephen Sondheim's A Funny Thing Happened on the Way to the Forum, Company, Follies, Sunday in the Park with George, Sweeney Todd, A Little Night Music and Into the Woods
- John Kander and Fred Ebb's Cabaret, and Chicago
- Andrew Lloyd Webber's Evita, Jesus Christ Superstar, Cats, The Phantom of the Opera, Starlight Express, Sunset Boulevard, Joseph and the Amazing Technicolor Dreamcoat
- Stephen Schwartz's Pippin, Godspell, and Wicked
- Jonathan Larson's Rent
- Claude-Michel Schönberg's Les Misérables, Miss Saigon
- Charles Strouse's Bye Bye Birdie (with Lee Adams) and Annie (with Martin Charnin)
- Jim Jacobs and Warren Casey's Grease

== Bibliography ==
- Green, Stanley. Encyclopedia of the Musical Theatre. New York: Dodd, Mead, 1976
