= Save Me, Save Me =

"Save Me, Save Me" is a song written by Barry Gibb and Albhy Galuten in 1977. It was recorded by the group Network from New York City. The flipside was "Not Love at All". This song is the first track credited to Gibb and Galuten. George Bitzer was hired to play synthesizers and keyboards and he later worked with Barry and Andy Gibb. It was recorded in Criteria Studios, Miami, around April 1977, same session as Samantha Sang recorded her well-known hit "Emotion". The song was issued in Netherlands and the B-side was "Holly".

== Cover versions ==
- Frankie Valli recorded this song as a follow-up to "Grease", also written by Barry. It appeared on his album Frankie Valli... Is the Word (1978). According to Billboard, Valli's vocal performance generates similar enthusiasm as his performance of "Grease". Record World said that "It has a bit of Bee Gees' flavor with Valli's vocals set off perfectly by Bob Gaudio's production." Valli's version briefly charted on Billboard's Easy Listening chart, reaching number 48.
- Teri DeSario covered this track and released it on the album Pleasure Train (1978), along with "Ain't Nothing Gonna Keep Me From You", also written by Barry
- Dusty Springfield covered "Save Me, Save Me" for her album Living Without Your Love (1979).
