= Grease (song) =

1978 song by Frankie Valli

- Italian vinyl single picture sleeve

Single by Frankie Valli

from the album Grease: The Original Soundtrack from the Motion Picture and Frankie Valli... Is the Word
- B-side: "Grease" (Instrumental)
- Released: May 1978
- Recorded: 1977–78
- Studio: Criteria (Miami)
- Genre: Funk; disco; pop
- Length: 3:21
- Label: RSO; Warner Bros.
- Songwriter: Barry Gibb
- Producer: Gibb-Galuten-Richardson

Frankie Valli singles chronology
| "Rainstorm" (1977) | "Grease" (1978) | "Save Me, Save Me" (1978) |

"Grease" is a song written by Barry Gibb and recorded by Frankie Valli: it was released as a single in May 1978. It is the title song for the musical motion picture Grease of that year, which was in turn based on the 1971 stage play Grease. The song celebrates the greaser lifestyle. It sold over seven million copies worldwide and appeared twice on the film's soundtrack, first as the opening track and again as the closing track. "Grease" is one of four songs written specifically for the film that had not been in the stage production.

== Background ==
Jim Jacobs and Warren Casey had written a different title track for Grease for its original Chicago production, but the song was discarded when the show was picked up on Broadway. Barry Gibb was commissioned to compose a new title song for Robert Stigwood's film of the stage musical.

== Production ==
The song was recorded separately from, and later than, the rest of those in the film. Shortly after the filming of the 1978 musical Sgt. Pepper's Lonely Hearts Club Band, Gibb invited castmate Peter Frampton to play guitar on the Grease session, while also providing backing vocals himself. The other musicians were some of those from the Andy Gibb album that was being made around the same time. Frankie Valli was approached to provide the vocals, due to his vocal range being similar to that of Barry Gibb, his being under the management of Allan Carr at the time, and his status as a popular singer from the pre-British Invasion era that Grease represented. Gibb had a long-standing respect for Valli as "one of the hallmark voices of our generation". Valli accepted, despite suffering from severe otosclerosis and loss of hearing at the time. When Valli recorded "Grease", he did not have a recording contract, having been contracted to Private Stock Records which had folded earlier in 1978. After the single was released on the RSO label, which also issued the soundtrack, Valli quickly landed a deal with Warner Bros., which had Valli's group the Four Seasons under contract at the time. Valli did not want to record a full album for RSO because he felt that Robert Stigwood had too much control over the Bee Gees' career and had too much of a conflict of interest in his numerous job titles.

"Grease" was one of four songs in the film that had not been part of the original musical, and it was the only one not performed by the cast. Valli had been offered the part of the Teen Angel but chose to sing the theme song instead, stating that although that character's song ("Beauty School Dropout") did not chart as a hit, both Valli and Frankie Avalon profited mightily from their respective appearances through album royalties, and thus the choice worked out. The film's director, Randal Kleiser, did not like the added songs because they did not fit the late 1950s/early 1960s style either musically or lyrically, and Kleiser had planned on a different composition by Charles Fox and Paul Williams (Fox having written the theme from Happy Days) before being overruled by the producers. The anachronism was especially true of "Grease", which used disco instrumentation and a contemporary 1970s beat but was, nonetheless, left in.

The film's opening title sequence animation, with "Grease" being played, was created by animator John David Wilson's Fine Arts Films studio.

== Reception ==
"Grease" became a number-one single in the United States in 1978 and also reached number forty on the R&B charts in the same year. Later in 1978, Valli released a follow-up album, the title of which, Frankie Valli... Is the Word, echoes the "grease is the word" lyric contained in the chorus of "Grease". To date, "Grease" is Valli's most recent Top 40 hit as a solo artist.

Record World said that it has "a hot, seventies dance beat that is far from the fifties" and that "Valli sings it well."

As of 2019, "Grease" ranked 220th in airplay among songs played on classic hits stations in the United States. By 2024, it had fallen out of the top 500 most-played songs in the format, a casualty of the format's shift toward 1990s music.

The Bee Gees never recorded a studio version of this song; however, they later performed the song in their One Night Only tour from 1997 until 1999 and included a performance (as a virtual duet with Valli's original 1978 studio vocal) on their live album One Night Only (1998).

== Personnel ==
- Frankie Valli – lead vocals
- Barry Gibb – backing vocals
- The Sweet Inspirations – backing vocals
- Peter Frampton – lead guitar
- Joey Murcia, George Terry – guitar
- Harold Cowart – bass
- Ron Ziegler – drums
- Gary Brown – saxophone
- Karl Richardson – engineer, producer

== Charts ==
=== Weekly charts ===
| Chart (1978) | Peak position |
|---|---|
| Australia (Kent Music Report) | 2 |
| Belgium (Ultratop 50 Flanders) | 4 |
| Canada Top Singles (RPM) | 1 |
| France (IFOP) | 4 |
| Ireland (IRMA) | 3 |
| Netherlands (Dutch Top 40) | 1 |
| Netherlands (Single Top 100) | 3 |
| New Zealand (Recorded Music NZ) | 2 |
| Norway (VG-lista) | 4 |
| South Africa (Springbok Radio) | 14 |
| Spain (AFYVE) | 13 |
| Sweden (Sverigetopplistan) | 6 |
| Switzerland (Schweizer Hitparade) | 7 |
| UK Singles (Official Charts) | 3 |
| US Billboard Hot 100 | 1 |
| US Adult Contemporary (Billboard) | 13 |
| US Cash Box Top 100 | 1 |
| West Germany (GfK) | 24 |

=== Year-end charts ===
| Chart (1978) | Position |
|---|---|
| Australia (Kent Music Report) | 18 |
| Belgium (Ultratop Flanders) | 27 |
| Canada Top Singles (RPM) | 6 |
| Netherlands (Dutch Top 40) | 11 |
| Netherlands (Single Top 100) | 30 |
| New Zealand (RMNZ) | 12 |
| UK (British Market Research Bureau) | 29 |
| US Billboard Hot 100 | 11 |
| US Cash Box Top 100 | 11 |

== Certifications ==
| Region | Certification | Certified units/sales |
|---|---|---|
| Canada (Music Canada) | Platinum | 150,000^{^} |
| New Zealand (RMNZ) | Platinum | 30,000^{‡} |
| United Kingdom (BPI) | Gold | 500,000^{^} |
| United States (RIAA) | Platinum | 2,000,000^{^} |
^{^} Shipments figures based on certification alone.^{‡} Sales+streaming figures based on certification alone.

== Cover versions ==
- Craig McLachlan covered the song in 1993. This version reached number 44 in the UK.
- Gareth Gates covered the song in 2003 as part of ITV's Greasemania.
