= Frankie Valli... Is the Word =

Frankie Valli...Is the Word

Studio album by Frankie Valli
- Released: August 1978
- Genres: Rock; funk; soul; pop; pop rock; disco
- Length: 36:47
- Label: Warner Bros.
- Producers: Gibb-Galuten-Richardson (track 1), Bob Gaudio (other tracks)

Frankie Valli chronology
Lady Put the Light Out (1977)	Frankie Valli...Is the Word (1978)	Heaven Above Me (1980)

Frankie Valli...Is the Word is an album by Frankie Valli, released in 1978 on the Warner Bros. Records label.

== Background, composition, and recording ==
The Four Seasons, the band Valli had fronted since 1960, had broken up in 1977 to pursue other projects, and though Valli had released Lady Put the Light Out that year, he was left without a record label when Private Stock Records ceased operations in early 1978. Shortly thereafter, while recovering from surgery to restore his hearing, he received an offer from RSO Records to participate in the movie adaptation of the Broadway musical Grease. He was given the choice of either the theme song or "Beauty School Dropout" and, believing that the theme would be the bigger hit (despite the fact that he would not be able to act or appear on-screen in the film, a longstanding wish of his), chose the theme song. The single went to number one and was certified platinum.

Valli was unwilling to sign with RSO due to Robert Stigwood's control over his clients' careers (Valli and Bob Gaudio had a policy of retaining and licensing the rights to their music) and instead approached Warner Bros. Records, which had released the two previous Four Seasons albums. This album was released as a follow-up of the success of this song, its title echoing the chorus of the hit, "Grease is the word". The "Grease" theme, which had been on the Grease soundtrack, was also included as the lead-off track on this album.

== Reception ==
In a retrospective review, William Ruhlmann of AllMusic recalled that the album's release "served to demonstrate that 'Grease' was more of a phenomenon related to the movie and the Bee Gees than to Valli himself." In his November 1978 review for Stereo Review magazine, Peter Reilly remarked that:

Even though he's beginning to look a lot like the late Katina Paxinou (a shade less rugged, perhaps), the current Frankie Valli still sounds deadeningly like the early Frankie Valli. The film Grease breathed some new life into his career, but his latest album demonstrates that Frankie firmly intends to prolong his adolescence, Fifties style, into recording eternity. No matter what he sings here [...] he still comes on like that same old grossly unrequited teenage lover nervously baying outside the corner candy store. I'm sure that there are middle-aged matrons around who still get the hiccups when Frankie starts up, just as I'm sure also that he'll still be the rage among certain citizens of Sun Cities in the 1990s. But by that time I hope to be quite deaf.

Bruce Westbrook, writing in August 1978, was perhaps more damning. He described the album as 'a listless, trivial boring recording', the only worthwhile elements being the leadoff track, 'Grease' and two other songs: 'You Better Go' by Fred W. Webb and Lenny Lee Goldsmith and 'Save Me, Save Me', which was written by Barry Gibb and Albhy Galuten. 'Elsewhere,' Westbrook wrote, 'the album is strictly background music - undistinguished, unobtrusive and uninspiring.'

== Track listing ==
1. "Grease" (Barry Gibb) – 3:27
2. "Needing You" (Frankie Valli, Kevin Tighe, Lee Shapiro) – 3:24
3. "Sometimes Love Songs Make Me Cry" (Bill LaBounty, Jay Senter, Milo Adamo) – 4:26
4. "Without Your Love" (Kevin Tighe, Lenny Lee Goldsmith) – 4:10
5. "Over Me" (Bob Gaudio, Judy Parker) – 3:32
6. "Save Me, Save Me" (Albhy Galuten, Barry Gibb) – 3:26
7. "You Can Do It" (Ben Weisman, Evie Sands, Richard Germinaro) – 3:27
8. "A Tear Can Tell" (Bill LaBounty) – 3:55
9. "You Better Go" (Fred Webb, Lenny Lee Goldsmith) – 3:42
10. "No Love at All" (Frankie Valli, Kevin Tighe, Lee Shapiro) – 3:18
