= Pleasure Train (album) =

Studio album by Teri DeSario
- Released: October 1978
- Recorded: 1978
- Studio: Criteria (Miami, Florida); Muscle Shoals Sound (Muscle Shoals, Alabama)
- Genre: Disco
- Label: Casablanca
- Producer: Ron Albert & Howard Albert; Denny Randall; Gibb-Galuten-Richardson

Teri DeSario chronology
Pleasure Train (1978)	Moonlight Madness (1979)

Pleasure Train is the debut studio album by American singer-songwriter, producer, and composer Teri DeSario, released in October 1978 by Casablanca (NBLP 7115).

The album includes the disco hit "Ain't Nothing Gonna Keep Me from You", which was written and co-produced by Barry Gibb. The version featured on this album is different from the 12" version. Also included was "You're the Stuff Dreams Are Made Of", which peaked at number forty-one on the disco chart.

== CD release ==
Gold Legion released Pleasure Train on CD in early June 2012 as an expanded edition. The track listing included the extended 12" versions of "Ain't Nothing Gonna Keep Me from You" and "The Stuff Dreams Are Made Of".

== Track listing ==
Side one

1. "The Stuff Dreams Are Made Of" (Joey Carbone, Lenny Lambert) – 3:25
2. "Back in Your Arms Again" (Denny Randell, Sandy Linzer) – 3:15
3. "Pleasure Train" (Bill Purse, Teri DeSario) – 4:24
4. "It Takes a Man and a Woman" (Denny Randell, Letty Jo Randell) – 3:52
5. "Save Me, Save Me" (Barry Gibb, Albhy Galuten) – 3:30

Side two

6. "Ain't Nothing Gonna Keep Me from You" (Barry Gibb) – 3:52
7. "Just Another Song and Dance Man" (Denny Randell, Sandy Linzer) – 3:01
8. "Someone Kind of Thing" (Betty Wright, Clay Cropper, Elise Kratish) – 2:44
9. "Baby, I Don't Want Your Love" (Bill Purse, Teri DeSario) – 3:08
10. "Loving You the First Time" (Bill Purse, Teri DeSario) – 3:45

== Personnel ==
- Produced by Ron Albert, Howard Albert and Denny Randall, except on "Sometime Kind of Thing" by Ron and Howard Albert, and on "Ain't Nothing Gonna Keep Me from You" by Barry Gibb, Albhy Galuten and Karl Richardson
- Engineered by Bill Fair and David Yates
- Teri DeSario: lead and backing vocals
- Ken Bell: guitar
- Mickey Buckins: percussion
- Paul Harris: keyboards
- Roger Hawkins: drums
- David Hood: bass guitar
- Jimmy Johnson: guitar
- Randy McCormick: keyboards
- Bill Purse: horn and string arrangements (on "Baby I Don't Want Your Love" and "The Stuff Dreams Are Made Of"), keyboards
- George Terry: guitar (overdubs)
- Laura Taylor: backing vocals
- Bobby Caldwell: backing vocals
- BRANDEY (Donna Davis, Cynthia Douglas, Pam Vincent): backing vocals
- Mike Lewis: horn and string arrangements
- Bill Fair: recording engineer (at Muscle Shoals Sound Studios)
- David Yates: recording engineer (at Muscle Shoals Sound Studios)
- Bruce Hensel: recording engineer (at Criteria Studios)
- Jerry Masters: recording engineer (at Criteria Studios)
- Don Gehman: recording engineer (at Criteria Studios)

On "Ain't Nothing Gonna Keep Me from You":

- Teri DeSario: lead and backing vocals
- Barry Gibb: backing vocals
- Albhy Galuten: synthesizer
- Joey Murcia: guitar
- George Terry: guitar
- George Bitzer: keyboards
- Paul Harris: keyboards
- George Perry: bass guitar
- Stan Kipper: drums
- Butch Polvermo: percussion

The Boneroo Horns:

- Peter Graves
- Whit Sidener
- Ken Faulk
- Neil Bonsanti
- Vinnie Tianno
- Chris Colclesser
- Mike Lewis
- Karl Richardson: recording engineer
