= Candice Earley =

American actress and singer (1950–2019)

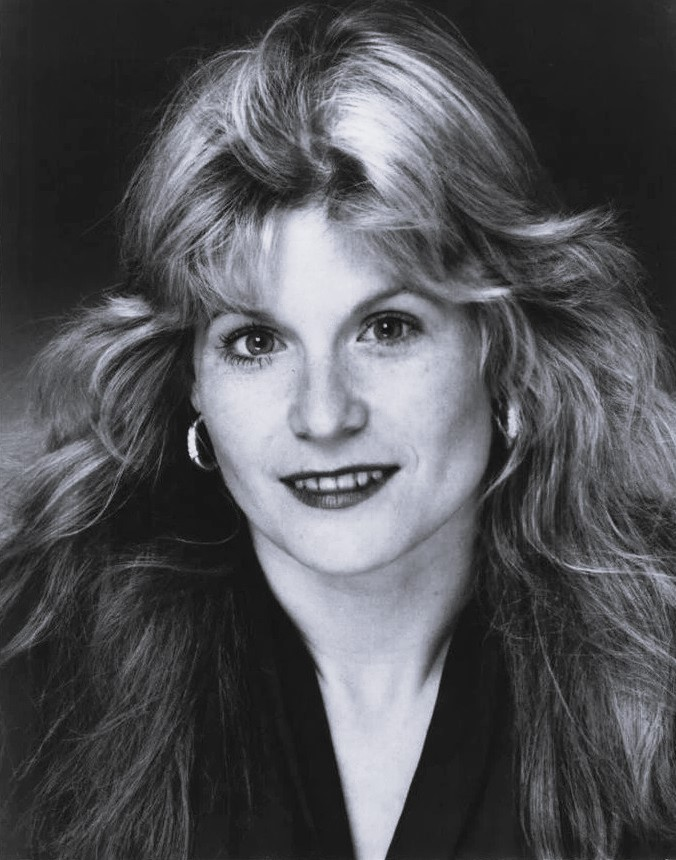
- Earley in 1982
- Born: Candice Jean Earley; August 18, 1950; Lawton, Oklahoma, US
- Died: January 31, 2019 (aged 68); El Dorado, Arkansas, US
- Occupations: Actress, singer
- Spouse: Robert Nolan (m. 1992)

Candice Jean Earley (August 18, 1950 – January 31, 2019) was an American actress and singer born in Oklahoma.

== Early years ==
Earley was born in Lawton, Oklahoma, to Harold and Jean (née Daily) Earley. She won the Miss Lawton title. She had 14 years of training as a classical singer and attended Trinity University, where she studied drama.

== Career ==
Earley had Broadway roles in Hair, Grease, and Jesus Christ Superstar. She also portrayed Sheila with a touring company of Hair and sang in the chorus of a touring company of Jesus Christ, Superstar. A lyric soprano, Earley also performed in cabarets. She starred as Sandy Dumbrowski in Grease in 1974.

Earley is most famous for her role as Donna Beck Tyler Cortlandt Sago Tyler on the soap opera All My Children, a role she played from February 19th 1976 to 1992. Donna was originally a troubled youth from an abusive home, who was a runaway and a prostitute. In her first appearance on All My Children, Donna is found in a hospital bed and in a coma after being kidnapped, beaten and raped by her pimp, Tyrone. However, the actress playing the part of Donna was not Candice Earley, but a different actress originally hired to play the part. The producers were unsatisfied with the acting ability of this actress, and Earley was hired to play the part, which was slated to be a short-term role.

Earley's portrayal proved popular with viewers, and won an award for Most Exciting New Actress in the first annual Soapies held in 1977 (these awards are now known as the Soap Opera Digest Awards). Over time, the character of Donna grew into a mature woman with a gift for singing who opened and ran a successful hair salon. Earley was written out of the show in 1992 after she got married.

== Death ==
Earley died on January 31, 2019, after an eight-year battle with multiple system atrophy (MSA).
