= Laurie Graff =

American author, playwright, and actress (born 1956)

- Born: May 25, 1956 (age 70); New York
- Occupations: Author, playwright, publicist
- Notable work: You Have to Kiss a Lot of Frogs; Looking for Mr. Goodfrog; The Shiksa Syndrome
- Website: www.lauriegraff.com

Laurie Graff (born in New York, May 25, 1956) is an American author, playwright, actress, and publicist. Her written works include You Have to Kiss a Lot of Frogs, Looking for Mr. Goodfrog, and The Shiksa Syndrome.

== Career ==
As an actress, Graff appeared as Frenchy in Grease on Broadway and a national tour. She also performed in a national tour of Laughter on the 23rd Floor, and an off-Broadway production of In the Boom Boom Room, in addition to other stage productions during her acting career. She also appears as herself in a documentary about dating in New York City, titled Mr. Right.

Her first novel You Have to Kiss a Lot of Frogs was published in 2004 and became a bestseller. It was reviewed by Publishers Weekly.

In 2005, she published a holiday-themed romance novella in the collection Scenes From a Holiday. In 2006, she published her second novel, Looking for Mr. Goodfrog, which continues the story from You Have to Kiss a Lot of Frogs. A review by Publishers Weekly states, "While Graff doesn't break any new ground, she offers a fun tour of New York, and readers will welcome the return of her smart narrator."

The Shiksa Syndrome was published in 2008 and described as a novel about "a thirty something single Jewish woman who, wanting to find "a nice Jewish boy," attempts to pass for a shiksa (non-Jewish woman)" in a Library Journal review of the audiobook. A review by Publishers Weekly states, "Graff's prose crackles with winning wit, making her potentially annoying conceit go down like a chocolate-covered macaroon." In a review for Booklist, Patty Engelmann writes, "Graff's latest is by turns funny and poignant as she explores religious identity and modern relationships and finds that sometimes Mr. Wrong may be more right than Mr. Right."

Her work as a playwright is included in the anthologies New Monologues for Women by Women and Best Men's Stage Monologues of 1999. One-act plays All My Problems, Telephone Call for Francine Stein, Love in the Time of Recession, and Charlie & Flo (at PS NBC) have been produced at WorkShop Theater Company where she is a member.

== Selected works ==
- You Have to Kiss a Lot of Frogs (Red Dress Ink, 2004)
- Scenes From a Holiday (Red Dress Ink, 2005)
- Looking for Mr. Goodfrog (Red Dress Ink, 2006)
- The Shiksa Syndrome (Broadway Books, 2008)
- Charlie & Flo (one-act play) (WorkShop Theater Company and PSNBC, 2008)
- Preface author in Marjorie Hillis, Live Alone and Like It: The Classic Guide for the Single Woman (5 Spot, 2008)
