= Ain't Nothing Gonna Keep Me from You =

"Ain't Nothing Gonna Keep Me From You"

Single by Teri DeSario

from the album Pleasure Train
- B-side: "Someone Kind of Thing"
- Released: July 1978
- Recorded: February 1978
- Studio: Criteria (Miami)
- Genre: Disco
- Length: 3:58 (7"/LP); 6:33 (12")
- Label: Casablanca
- Songwriter(s): Barry Gibb
- Producer(s): Gibb-Galuten-Richardson

Teri DeSario singles chronology
"Ain't Nothing Gonna Keep Me From You" (1978)	"The Stuff Dreams Are Made Of" (1978)

"Ain't Nothing Gonna Keep Me From You" is a song written by Barry Gibb in 1977. It was recorded by Teri DeSario and was her debut single and was included on her debut album Pleasure Train (1978). It entered the US charts on 22 July 1978, the same week that the number-one single was Andy Gibb's "Shadow Dancing", which was co-written by Barry and co-produced by Albhy Galuten. The musicians who played on this song also played on "Shadow Dancing". The single peaked at #43 on the Billboard Hot 100.

Her next single "The Stuff Dreams Are Made Of" was released in the same year, this song was chosen as the B-side. In 1992, Unidisc released this song as the B-side and the A-side was Alicia Bridges' "I Love the Nightlife". The song also reached #52 in the United Kingdom.

== Background and recording ==
Co-producer Albhy Galuten heard DeSario in a club, and Gibb was involved in recording a song for her and Barry sang background vocals in a falsetto style on this song and provided lead vocal on the line: No nothing.

The musicians who played on this song also participated on Andy Gibb's album Shadow Dancing, Joey Murcia and George Terry on guitar, George Bitzer and Paul Harris on keyboards, George Perry on bass and Ron Ziegler on drums and The Boneroo Horns consisted of Peter Graves, Whit Sidener, Ken Faulk, Bill Purse, Neil Bonsanti and Stan Webb, the orchestra was arranged by Albhy Galuten, engineered by Karl Richardson, produced by Barry Gibb, Galuten and Richardson.

George Bitzer from the group Network participated on this track and horn player Bill Purse was married to Teri DeSario. It was recorded around February 1978 same month as Barry recorded "Grease" performed by Frankie Valli with Peter Frampton on guitar. The 22 July 1978 US charts when this song was charted, "Grease" was at number 6.

A 2005 version of the song also with DeSario on vocals was released in the Philippines as a promotion to her concert with Joe Pizzulo that version was arranged by Frederick Garcia.

== Personnel ==
- Teri DeSario - lead vocals
- Barry Gibb - background vocals
- Joey Murcia - guitar
- George Terry - guitar
- George Bitzer - keyboards
- Paul Harris - keyboards
- George Perry - bass
- Ron Ziegler - drums
- Peter Graves - horns
- Whit Sidener - horns
- Ken Faulk - horns
- Bill Purse - horns
- Neil Bonsanti - horns
- Stan Webb - horns
- Albhy Galuten - orchestral arrangement
- Karl Richardson - engineer
