= Timothy Meyers =

- Born: Timothy Francis Meyers; August 31, 1945; New Orleans, Louisiana
- Died: March 14, 1989 (aged 43); New York City
- Occupation: Actor
- Years active: 1970–1989

Timothy Meyers (August 31, 1945 – March 14, 1989) was an American actor famous for originating the role of Kenickie in Grease and was a 1972 nominee for Tony Award Best Featured Actor in a Musical. His first stage role was in 1970 as Crookfinger Jake in Kurt Weill and Bertolt Brecht's The Threepenny Opera. His other stage roles include the 1980s musical Sidewalkin (Oscar), HotGrog (Blackbeard), The Foursome (Tim), No Place to be Somebody (Shanty), Rock Island (Wally), The Sugar Bowl (Pinky), Romeo and Jeanette (Lucien), Jack the Ripper (Lusk), Wait Until Dark (Harry Roat), Cabaret (Ernst Ludwig), The Fantasticks (Henry), Terra Nova (Bowers), The Dresser (Geoffrey Thornton), True West (Saul Kimmer), Curse of the Starving Class (Weston), One Flew Over the Cuckoo's Nest (Scanlon), Lady of the Diamond (Sportscaster), Write Me a Murder (Charles Sturrock), She Stoops to Conquer (Stingo), Ah, Wilderness! (David McComber), Loot (Meadows), Tartuffe (Damis), The Caretaker (Mick), Steambath (Morty), Comedians (Phil Murray), King Lear (Oswald), A Midsummer Night's Dream (Puck), Measure for Measure (Pompey), and The Greeks (Odysseus).

His film appearances include The Taking of Pelham One Two Three, Night of the Juggler, I, the Jury, and To Smithereens. His television credit is the Kojak episode "Kojak's Days (1)". He also produced a play at the Lincoln Center Library in 1980 entitled Little Tips.

He was also a drama coach at the University of Pittsburgh.

On March 14, 1989, he died from complications of AIDS.

== Partial filmography ==
- The Taking of Pelham One Two Three (1974) – Plumber
- Night of the Juggler (1980) – Anderson
- I, the Jury (1982) – Blake (final film role)
