= Caught (album) =

Studio album by Teri DeSario
- Released: 1980
- Studio: Sunset Sound (Los Angeles); Davlen (Hollywood)
- Genre: Disco
- Length: 34:33
- Label: Casablanca
- Producer: Bill Purse, Exec. H.W. Casey

Teri DeSario chronology
Moonlight Madness (1979)	Caught (1980)	A Call to Us All (1983)

Caught is the third album by singer, songwriter, producer and composer Teri DeSario, released in 1980 by Casablanca Records and Filmworks Inc. (NBLP-7231).

The 1980 album contains the songs "All I Wanna Do" and "Time After Time".

== Background ==
After achieving some moderate success with her previous album Moonlight Madness, DeSario's label suggested to her that she make a rock album with the cream of Los Angeles session musicians to rival rising stars like Pat Benatar and Kim Carnes. Since the label was willing to let her keyboardist/songwriter/producer husband handle the project, she readily agreed, and decided to call the album Caught, after the first track on it.

Caught saw low sales, and would not receive the radio airplay of DeSario's previous two efforts. Kerrang! journalist Paul Suter later included the title track on the 'Striktly for Konnoisseurs' compilation he put together a few years later.

== Track listing ==
=== Side one ===
1. "Caught" – 4:12
2. "Time After Time" – 3:44
3. "I'm with You Now" – 3:48
4. "Standin' on the Edge" – 5:00

=== Side two ===
5. "Hittin' Below the Belt" – 3:40
6. "I've Got a Secret" – 3:34
7. "All I Wanna Do" – 3:19
8. "I Hate You" – 3:56
9. "I Should Have Known Better" – 3:20

== Personnel ==
- Producer – Bill Purse
- Executive producer – H.W. Casey
- Engineering – Humberto Gatica
- Assistants – Jeff Borgeson, Ernie Sheesley, Peggie McCreary and Steven McNanus
- Mastering – Bernie Grundman at A&M Studios, Los Angeles, CA.
- Guitars – Steve Lukather, Richie Zito, Michael Landau, Mitch Holder
- Drums – Mike Baird, Carlos Vega
- Keyboards – Bill Purse, James Newton Howard, Steve Porcaro, David Foster, Michael Boddicker
- Background vocals – Joey Carbone, Bill Purse, Teri DeSario, John Joyce, Jim Haas, Bruce Hornsby
- Percussion – Paulinho DaCosta

== Additional album credits ==
=== Side one ===
1. Teri DeSario, Joey Carbone
2. Teri DeSario, Joey Carbone, Richie Zito, Bill Purse
3. Desmond Child
4. Richie Zito

=== Side two ===
1. Mark Aguilar, Bill Purse
2. Bill Purse
3. Teri DeSario, Joey Carbone
4. Tom Keanne, Mike Himelstein
5. Paul McCartney, John Lennon
