= Ken Waissman =

American theatre producer

- Born: Kenneth Jay Waissman; January 24, 1940 (age 85); Baltimore, MD
- Occupation: theatre producer

Kenneth Waissman (born January 1940) is an American theatre producer.

Waissman's first Broadway credit was the 1971 Paul Zindel play And Miss Reardon Drinks a Little with Estelle Parsons and Julie Harris. The following year, while he and partner Maxine Fox were in Chicago, they attended Grease, a popular local play about high school life in the 1950s being performed at the Kingston Mines Theater in the Old Town section of the city. The two thought it would work better as a musical and encouraged its writers, Jim Jacobs and Warren Casey, to relocate to New York City and embellish it with a score. The result was Grease, which Waissman and Fox mounted off-Broadway before transferring it uptown. It garnered him his first Tony nomination. He was nominated again for Over Here!; the third time proved to be the charm when he won not only a Tony but a Drama Desk Award as well for Torch Song Trilogy.

== Other Broadway credits ==
- Agnes of God (1982)
- The Octette Bridge Club (1985)
- Asinamali! (1987)
- Carrie - The Musical (1988)
- Street Corner Symphony (1997)
