= Moonlight Madness (Teri DeSario album) =

Studio album by Teri DeSario
- Released: 1979
- Studio: Westlake Audio, Los Angeles and Devonshire Studios, Los Angeles
- Genre: Disco
- Length: 41:40
- Label: Casablanca, Filmworks
- Producer: Harry Wayne Casey

Teri DeSario chronology
Pleasure Train (1978)	Moonlight Madness (1979)	Caught (1980)

Moonlight Madness is the second studio album by singer Teri DeSario, released in 1979 by Casablanca Records and Filmworks (NBLP-7178). It includes the hit single "Yes, I'm Ready", a duet with K.C. of KC and the Sunshine Band.

The album contains mostly disco music, including "Dancin' in the Streets" and "I'm Ready".

== Track listing ==
Side one
No.	Title	Length
1.	"Moonlight Madness"	4:59
2.	"Heart of Stone"	3:25
3.	"With Your Love"	4:26
4.	"Hold On"	4:54
5.	"Dancin' in the Streets" (Duet with K.C.)	3:10

Side two
No.	Title	Length
1.	"Sell My Soul for You"	5:39
2.	"Goin Thru Emotions"	3:28
3.	"Fallin'"	3:00
4.	"Yes I'm Ready" (Duet with K.C.)	3:18
5.	"You Got What It Takes"	5:16

== Personnel ==
- Recorded at Westlake Audio, Los Angeles and Devonshire Studios, Los Angeles

Musicians

- Teri DeSario – main artist, vocals (lead and backing)
- Sid Sharp – concertmaster
- Al Ciner, Mitch Holder, Snuffy Walden – guitars
- Dennis Belfield – bass guitar
- Michael Boddicker, Harry Wayne Casey, Tom Hensley, Michael Lang, Bill Purse – keyboards
- Carlos Vega – drums
- Paulinho Da Costa and Alan Estes – percussion
- Vincent DeRosa – French horn
- Joey Carbone, H.W. Casey, Patricia Henderson, and Julia and Maxine Waters – backing vocals
- Gary Herbig, Jim Horn, and Kim Hutchcroft – saxophone
- Michael Boddicker – synthesizer
- Dick Hyde – trombone
- Jerry Hey, Steve Madaio and Dalton Smith – trumpet

Production

- H.W. Casey – production and management
- Erick Zobler – audio engineering
- Mixed at Devonshire Studios by Humberto Gatica and Mike Mancini (assistant)
- SNB – mastering
- Don Foster – management
- Shaun Harris – contractor
- Harry Langdon – photography
- Edward Beckett and Gribbitt! – design
- Alice Gellis – wardrobe
- Armando Cosio – hair and make-up

== Additional album credits ==
Strings and rhythm sections arranged by Bill Purse, horns section arranged by Jerry Hey.

=== Side 1 ===
1. Teri Desario-Bill Purse. Blitfistly Music (BMI)
2. Joey Carbone Resurrection Music Inc.
3. Joey Carbone-Karen Tobin Resurrection Music/Sixty-Ninth Street Music (BMI)
4. Frannie Golde, Albert Hammond Albert Hammond Music (ASCAP) Braintree Music/Goldie's Gold (BMI)
5. William Stevenson, Marvin Gaye, Ivy Hunter Jobete Music Company Inc.

=== Side 2 ===
1. Lionel Azulay Carbet Music/Harrick music Inc.
2. Joey Carbone, Richie Zito, Larry McNally Resurrection Music/Sixty-Ninth Street Music (BMI)/McNally Music Publishing (ASCAP)
3. Words by Carol Bayer Sager Music by Marvin Hamlisch Chappel Music/Red Buller Music/Begonia Melodies (BMI)
4. Barbara Mason Dandelion Music Co. (BMI)
5. H.W. Casey, Bill Purse, Teri Desario Harrick Music/Sherlyn Music/Blitfistly Music (BMI)
