= Dave Konig =

American comedian and actor

- Years active: 1972–present
- Children: 4
- Website: http://davekonig.com

Dave Konig is an American comedian and actor. He has made appearances on Marvelous Mrs. Maisel, Crashing (U.S. TV series), The Blacklist, and The Enemy Within. He is also the author of a novel, Good Luck Mr. Gorsky.

He has hosted or co-hosted several TV shows, and appeared in films. He won three New York Emmy Awards as the co-host of the comedy series Subway Q&A and hosted the HBO late-night comedy series Hardcore TV. In 2015, he guest-starred in the second episode of season five of Louie.

As a comedic character actor, Dave Konig has appeared in such films as Final Rinse with Joey Ramone, Home Sweet Hoboken with Ben Gazzara, and Mambo Café with Danny Aiello. On TV he has appeared in season two of HBO’s Boardwalk Empire, and on NBC’s Law & Order: Criminal Intent. He made 11 appearances as the featured guest comedian on the talk/variety show Late Night with Joey Reynolds on NBC Nonstop.

Dave Konig has appeared in comedy clubs and cruise ships throughout his career. In 2010 and 2011, he toured the U.S. in the stand-up comedy revue Pastrami On Rye With Mayo with Tom Cotter, Cory Kahaney, and Ross Bennett. Dave Konig debuted on Broadway as Vince Fontaine in the Tommy Tune revival of Grease. In 2010, he starred Off Broadway in his own solo show Hebrew School Dropout at the Actors Temple Theater in New York City. The New York Times called the show “lightning fast, charming, insightful, and very, very funny”. In 2013, he debuted his second Off Broadway solo show Addicted to Show Business at the St. Luke's Theatre in New York City, which received positive “Reader’s Reviews” in the New York Times Theater section Other theater credits include regional productions of Sugar and The Odd Couple.
