= A Call to Us All =

Studio album by Teri DeSario
- Released: 1983
- Recorded: Mama Jo's, North Hollywood
- Genre: Contemporary Christian music
- Length: 43:16
- Label: Dayspring
- Producer: Bill Purse

Teri DeSario chronology
Caught (1980)	A Call to Us All (1983)	Voices In The Wind (1985)

Professional ratings
Review scores
Source	Rating
Billboard	(not rated)

A Call to Us All - Album Reverse

A Call to Us All is the fourth album from singer, songwriter, producer and composer Teri DeSario. It was recorded and mixed at Mama Jo's and mastered by Bernie Grundman at A&M Records. According to AllMusic, A Call to Us All peaked at 32 on Billboards Top Contemporary Christian music chart in 1984.

== Track listing ==
All tracks are written by Teri Purse & Bill Purse, except where noted.

Side One
No.	Title	Length
1.	"Thank You"	3:30
2.	"Battleline" (Purse, Don Cason, Purse)	3:40
3.	"I Dedicate All My Love to You"	4:57
4.	"Dig A Little Deeper"	4:00
5.	"Clouds Without Water"	5:30

Side Two
No.	Title	Length
1.	"All I Need"	4:30
2.	"Jesus Call Your Lambs"	4:10
3.	"I'll Carry On"	4:54
4.	"A Call to Us All"	7:25

== Personnel ==
- Produced and arranged by – Bill Purse
- Engineered and mixed by – Kevin Clark
  - assisted by – Steve Ford
- Additional engineering by – Steve Ford, Ed Cherney and Eddie King
- Recorded and mixed at Mama Jo's, N. Hollywood
- Strings Recorded at – Baby-O Recorders, Hollywood, CA
- Mastered by – Bernie Grundman / A&M Records
- Photography by – Harry Langdon
- Art Direction and Design by – Paul "Sport" Gross
- Inner Sleeve Design – Steve Elowe
- Makeup by – Victoria Jackson
- Underwater Sequences by – Scotty Scuba
- Label – Dayspring, A Division of Word Inc., Waco, Texas

== Dedication ==
The album was dedicated to her husband and best friend Bill Purse.
