= Teri DeSario =

American singer (born 1951)

- Born: Teri Lynn DeSario; November 27, 1951 (age 74)
- Origin: Miami, Florida
- Genres: Disco, funk, CCM
- Occupation: Singer-songwriter
- Years active: 1970–present
- Labels: Casablanca, Dayspring
- Formerly of: Early Music Consort

Teri Lynn DeSario (born November 27, 1951) is an American singer-songwriter from Miami, Florida.

== Career ==
=== Early career ===
DeSario worked within several music genres out of high school. She was a vocalist and played both recorder and harp from 1970–1977 with a medieval and Renaissance music group named the Early Music Consort. The group was headed by scholar and Pro Musica member Arnold Grayson. She began her career as a singer/songwriter in the folk genre and later expanded her love of folk music with her passion for jazz. After marrying horn player, arranger, and composer Bill Purse, they founded a pop-folk-jazz collaborative called Abacus. One night, a long-haired man walked into the club where she was performing and claimed to be the producer of the Bee Gees; to their surprise, he was. Barry Gibb had heard her demo of original music and was so inspired by DeSario's vocals that he wrote a song for her called "Ain't Nothing Gonna Keep Me from You" and helped her obtain a recording contract.

"Ain't Nothing Gonna Keep Me from You" from 1978 was DeSario's first hit single, written by Barry Gibb from her first album Pleasure Train, also released in 1978. Even though the first single from her debut, Pleasure Train, made #43 on the U.S. pop charts, she hadn't really enjoyed the recording experience and wanted a new direction. It was then that she bumped into an old school mate she knew as a teen, Harry Wayne Casey (KC) of KC and the Sunshine Band.

In the U.S., DeSario is mainly known for her duet with KC, lead singer of the R&B and funk group KC and the Sunshine Band of the Barbara Mason cover, "Yes, I'm Ready" from 1980 (#2 on the Billboard Hot 100 and certified gold, Adult Contemporary #1 for 2 weeks) from her second album Moonlight Madness, released in 1979. Follow-up singles (album title track) "Moonlight Madness" and a remake of "Dancin' in the Streets" charted but didn't make the Billboard Top 40.

By the end of 1980, her hit "Yes, I'm Ready" granted her one-hit wonder status, with the disco-era making an exit, even though her duet with KC was a pop-fused remake of a slow-dancing ballad. She went on to record two more albums for Casablanca, Caught, an album which reflected her situation with the record company, and Relationships, which was shelved when the company itself changed directions.

In the late 1970s/early 1980s, DeSario made TV appearances including American Bandstand with Captain & Tennille and KC (December 29, 1979), The Midnight Special with Tom Jones (February 8, 1980) and on Solid Gold hosted by the Pointer Sisters (January 17, 1981).

=== Christian music and other ventures ===
In the mid-1980s, she recorded two contemporary Christian albums in quick succession for Word Records, A Call to Us All and Voices in the Wind, which were co-written with and produced by Bill Purse. Between these two albums, she released a post-disco/dance-pop-flavored album with Joey Carbone and Richie Zito entitled Overnight Success (jp:オーバーナイト・サクセス) exclusively in Japan. The title track was released as a single but made minimal commercial impact.

In 1986, she was nominated for a Grammy in the gospel category for Best Female Performance for her album Voices in the Wind. She also wrote for and appeared on various artists' albums. During the same period, her music was popular in Japan and the Philippines. DeSario's music became more introspective and increasingly challenged conservative Christianity. In 1986, she requested that she be released from her contract at Word Records. In 1989, DeSario also performed/recorded a version of "Lifeline" with The Maranatha! Singers on a compilation CD for Maranatha! Music.

DeSario took her talents to production for Emergence on 1993's Laughing Medusa Theme Series, Vol. 1 release. DeSario was credited as executive producer, producer and vocalist and husband Bill Purse took on the roles of synthesizer, piano, arranger, keyboards, vocals, producer, engineer, editing, executive producer and mixing. DeSario would also provide vocals on Mark Snow's 1996 album, The Truth and the Light: Music from the X-Files

In 2012, Gold Legion.com digitally remastered Pleasure Train and released it on CD. Though it does not contain bonus tracks of the 12-inch dance versions, it comes with a 12-page booklet with liner notes that detail the story of the original album as told by its producers.

DeSario has since lived between Germany and Miami and sings from time to time with The Marschfellows in Germany. She is also part of Christian music groups and performs with them.

== Personal life ==
DeSario converted to Catholicism in the early 1980s. She is married to Bill Purse.

== Discography ==
- Pleasure Train (1978)
- Moonlight Madness (1979)
- Caught (1980)
- Time After Time: The Best of Teri DeSario (compilation from Casablanca) (Japan Only) / 1984 / 25SA-273
- A Call to Us All (1983)
- Overnight Success (Japan only) (Epic) (1984)
  - "Overnight Success" - 3:32
  - "Ocean of Love" - 4:07
  - "Dance of Love" - 4:45
  - "All of My Love" - 3:16
  - "Let's Dance" - 4:47
  - "Straight to the Heart" - 3:55
  - "Reach for the Top" - 4:05
  - "Just Loving You" - 4:07
- Voices in the Wind (DaySpring, U.S.) / 1985 / 701413101
  - "Celebrate" - 4:58
  - "Tapestry" - 3:56
  - "Attitude of Gratitude" - 4:25
  - "Voices in the Wind" - 4:53
  - "I Don't Wanna Be a Soldier" - 4:50
  - "Truth" - 4:43
  - "Ain't Givin' Up No Way" - 4:00
  - "All Day Thursday" - 5:29
- Teri DeSario - Gloria Jean's coffee sampler (2005)
  - "Fallin'" (from Moonlight Madness, 1979)
  - "It Takes a Man and a Woman"
  - "Ain't Nothing Gonna Keep Me from You"
  - "I'm Ready"
  - "I Will Always Love You"
