= Warren Casey =

American dramatist (1935–1988)

- Born: April 20, 1935; Yonkers, New York, US
- Died: November 8, 1988 (aged 53); Chicago, Illinois, US
- Occupations: Composer; Librettist; Lyricist; Actor
- Notable work: Grease

Warren Casey (April 20, 1935 – November 8, 1988) was an American theater composer, lyricist, writer, and actor. He was the writer and composer, with Jim Jacobs, of the stage musical Grease.

== Career ==
Warren Casey was born on April 20, 1935, in Yonkers, New York to Peter L. Casey, a steamfitter, and Signe (née Ginman) Casey, a nurse. He graduated from Gorton High School in 1952. Casey received his Fine Arts Degree from the Syracuse University School of Visual and Performing Arts in 1957.

=== Grease ===
In the mid-1960s, Casey met Jim Jacobs while acting with the Chicago Stage Guild. In the late 1960s, Jacobs was at a party dismayed at the rock music he was listening to and began reminiscing about 1950s rock and roll. He eventually inquired about writing a rock and roll musical with Casey, who (unlike Jacobs) had not been a greaser in high school but shared a love of the music of the era, particularly doo-wop. The two began collaborating on a play with music about high-school life during the golden age of rock 'n' roll in the 1950s. Entitled Grease, it premiered in 1971 at the Kingston Mines Theater, one of the pioneering companies of Chicago's off-Loop theater movement, in the Lincoln Park section of Chicago.

Producers Ken Waissman and Maxine Fox saw the show and suggested to the playwrights that it might work better as a musical, and told them if the creative partners were willing to rework it and they liked the result, they would produce it off-Broadway. Casey quit his day job as a department store lingerie buyer and the team headed to New York City to collaborate on what would become Grease, which opened at the Eden Theatre in downtown Manhattan, moved to Broadway, and earned him a Tony Award nomination for Best Book of a Musical.

The show went on to become a West End hit, a hugely successful film, and a staple of regional theatre, summer stock, community theatre, and high school drama groups.

=== Later career ===
Casey's acting credits include the original production of David Mamet's Sexual Perversity in Chicago in 1974 at the Organic Theater Company. Under Stuart Gordon's direction, Casey created the role of foul-mouthed self-styled makeout artist Bernie Litko, delivering a comically outrageous performance tinged with pathos. In the same year he fronted $1,000 to help start Victory Gardens Theater in Chicago. In 1976, he wrote Mudgett. He wrote (with Jim Jacobs) Island of Lost Coeds, a two-act musical, produced at Columbia College Chicago under the direction of Sheldon Patinkin. He also contributed incidental music to Twelfth Night in 1976 and new lyrics to June Moon in 1977.

In addition, Casey worked in the musical Cats.

== Personal life ==
Casey died of AIDS-related complications in Chicago at the age of 53. At the time of his death he was writing a musical with the Brazilian performer Valucha deCastro.
