= Grease (musical) =

1972 musical

- Original Broadway cast recording
- Music: Jim Jacobs; Warren Casey
- Lyrics: Jim Jacobs; Warren Casey
- Book: Jim Jacobs; Warren Casey
- Productions: 1971 Chicago; 1972 Broadway; 1973 West End; 1979 West End revival 1993 West End revival 1994 Broadway revival 1994 US tour 2001 West End revival 2002 West End revival 2007 West End revival 2007 Broadway revival 2008 US tour 2017 UK tour 2022 West End revival 2023 West End revival

Grease is a 1971 musical with music, lyrics, and a book by Jim Jacobs and Warren Casey. Named after the 1950s United States working-class youth subculture known as greasers and set in 1959 at the fictional Rydell High School in Northwest Chicago (based on Taft High School in Chicago, Illinois, and named after the rock singer Bobby Rydell), the musical follows ten working-class teenagers as they navigate the complexities of peer pressure, politics, personal core values, and love.

The score borrows heavily from the sounds of early rock and roll. In its original production in Chicago, Grease was a raunchy, raw, aggressive, vulgar show. Subsequent productions toned down the more risqué content. The show mentions social issues such as teenage pregnancy, peer pressure, and gang violence; its themes include love, friendship, teenage rebellion, and sexual exploration during adolescence. Jacobs described the show's basic plot as a subversion of common tropes of 1950s cinema, since the female lead, who in many 1950s films transformed the alpha male into a more sensitive and sympathetic character, is instead drawn into the man's influence and transforms into his wild, roguish fantasy.

Since it was first performed on February 5, 1971, at Kingston Mines nightclub in Chicago, Grease has been successful on both stage and screen, but the content has been diluted and its teenage characters have become less Chicago habitués (the characters' Polish-American backgrounds in particular are ignored with last names often changed, although two Italian-American characters are left identifiably ethnic) and more generic. The first Broadway production opened on June 7, 1972; when it closed in 1980, Grease's 3,388-performance run was the longest yet in Broadway history, although it was surpassed by A Chorus Line on September 29, 1983. It went on to become a West End hit, a successful feature film, two popular Broadway revivals in 1994 and 2007, and a staple of regional theatre, summer stock, community theatre, and high school and middle school drama groups. It remains Broadway's 18th longest-running show.

Grease was adapted in 1978 as a feature film, which starred John Travolta (who himself had been in stage productions in a different role) and British-Australian singer and actress Olivia Newton-John, removed the musical's Chicago urban setting, and introduced changes to the storyline, characters, and songs, while adding new songs and expanding some plot elements only alluded to in the musical. Some of these revisions have been incorporated into revivals of the musical. A 2016 live TV musical used elements from both the original stage version and the film. A 1982 film sequel, Grease 2, included only a few supporting characters from the film and musical and had no involvement from Jacobs or Casey; Jacobs has gone on record to voice his disapproval of Grease 2.

== Production history ==
=== Original productions and Broadway ===
The show's original production was directed by Guy Barile, choreographed by Ronna Kaye and produced by the Kingston Mines Theatre Company founded by June Pyskacek on Chicago's Lincoln Avenue. The script was based on Jim Jacobs' experience at William Taft High School, Chicago. Warren Casey collaborated with Jim and together they wrote the music and lyrics. It ran for eight months. The cast: Doug Stevenson (Danny), Leslie Goto (Sandy), Sue Williams (Rizzo), Polly Pen (Patty), Gary Houston (Roger), Marilu Henner (Marty), James Canning (Doody), Hedda Lubin (Frenchy), Bruce Hickey (Kenickie), Sheila Ray Ceaser (Jan), Bill Cervetti (Miller), Jerry Bolnick (Sonny), Judy Brubaker (Miss Lynch), Mike O'Connor (Vince Fontaine), Steve Munro (Eugene), Barbara Munro (Cha Cha), Mac Hamilton (Teen Angel) and George Lopez (Bum). In addition to the "R-rated" profanity and deliberate use of shock value, the Chicago version of Grease included a substantially different songbook, which was shorter and included multiple references to real Chicago landmarks.

Producers Ken Waissman and Maxine Fox saw the show and made a deal to produce it Off-Broadway. The team headed to New York City to collaborate on the New York production of Grease. It was after test runs of the original Chicago production had drawn extremely poor reviews that the production team transformed Grease into its familiar form. The new production, directed by Tom Moore and choreographed by Patricia Birch (who later choreographed the film adaptation, and directed the ill-fated sequel), opened Off-Broadway at the Eden Theatre in lower Manhattan on February 14, 1972. Though Grease opened geographically off-Broadway, it did so under first-class Broadway contracts. The show was deemed eligible for the 1972 Tony Awards, receiving seven Tony Award nominations.

On June 7, 1972, the production moved to the Broadhurst Theatre on Broadway, and on November 21, it moved to the Royale Theatre there, where it ran until January 27, 1980. For the five final weeks of the run, the show moved to the larger Majestic Theatre. By the time it closed on April 13, 1980, it had run 3,388 performances.

The original Broadway cast included Barry Bostwick as Danny, Carole Demas as Sandy, Adrienne Barbeau as Rizzo, and Timothy Meyers as Kenickie, with Alan Paul, Walter Bobbie and Marya Small in supporting roles. Replacements later in the run included Jeff Conaway as Danny, Candice Earley as Sandy, Peter Gallagher as Danny, Richard Gere as Sonny, Ilene Graff as Sandy, Randee Heller as Rizzo, Marilu Henner as Marty, Judy Kaye as Rizzo, Marcia Mitzman Gaven as Rizzo, Patrick Swayze as Danny, John Travolta as Doody, Treat Williams as Danny, Laurie Graff as Frenchy, and Jerry Zaks as Kenickie.

=== 1973 London run and 1979 return engagement ===
After an out-of-town tryout in Coventry, Grease made its London debut at the New London Theatre on June 26, 1973, with a cast that included Richard Gere as Danny, Stacey Gregg as Sandy, and Jacquie-Ann Carr as Rizzo. Later Paul Nicholas and Elaine Paige took over the leads. The production closed on February 14, 1974.

The show was revived at the Astoria Theatre from June 7 to September 22, 1979, with Michael Howe as Danny, Jacqueline Reddin as Sandy, and Hilary Labow as Rizzo. The company also included Tracey Ullman as Frenchy and Su Pollard as Cha-Cha.

=== 1993 London revival ===
The revival opened at the Dominion Theatre before transferring to the Cambridge Theatre in October 1996, where it ran until September 11, 1999. Directed by David Gilmore and produced by Robert Stigwood (who had also produced the film), the opening cast included Craig McLachlan (Danny); Debbie Gibson (Sandy — Sonia, then Samantha Janus later replaced Gibson as Sandy); Mike Doyle (Vince Fontaine); Tamzin Outhwaite (Patty); Shane Richie (Kenickie) and Sally Ann Triplett (Rizzo). (Variety, Review Abroad Grease, August 2–August 8, 1993) McLachlan was succeeded by Shane Richie, Luke Goss, Ian Kelsey and Darren Day. The production's success led to the first British national tour which featured Shane Richie as Danny, Helen Way as Sandy, Toby Hinson as Vince Fontaine/Teen Angel, Ben Richards/Alex Bourne as Kenickie and Michele Hooper as Rizzo. The score included four songs written for the film adaptation: "Hopelessly Devoted to You", "Sandy", "You're the One That I Want", and the title number. As in the film, the Burger Palace Boys were renamed the T-Birds for this revival.

=== 1994 Broadway revival and U.S. tour ===
After 20 previews, a Broadway revival directed and choreographed by Jeff Calhoun premiered on May 11, 1994, at the Eugene O'Neill Theatre, where it ran for 1,505 performances. The opening cast included Ricky Paull Goldin (Danny), Susan Wood (Sandy), Rosie O'Donnell (Rizzo), Sam Harris (Doody), Hunter Foster (Roger), Megan Mullally (Marty), and Billy Porter (Teen Angel). The production set a new standard for star replacements, casting celebrities from different entertainment sectors for limited engagements. Some of these notable performers were Linda Blair, Debby Boone, Chubby Checker, Dominique Dawes, Micky Dolenz, Sheena Easton, Debbie Gibson, Jasmine Guy, Jennifer Holliday, Al Jarreau, Lucy Lawless, Darlene Love, Maureen McCormick, Joe Piscopo, Mackenzie Phillips, Jon Secada, and Brooke Shields. Shields proved so popular in the role of Rizzo that the cast album was re-released with her voice substituting for O'Donnell's.

A U.S. national tour of the 1994 production started in September 1994 in New Haven, Connecticut, and ran for several years. The opening tour cast included Sally Struthers (Miss Lynch), who stayed with the tour for several years, Angela Pupello (Rizzo), Rex Smith (Danny), Trisha M. Gorman (Sandy), and Davy Jones (Vince Fontaine). Brooke Shields (Rizzo) started on the tour in November 1994 before joining the Broadway cast.

=== 1996 U.S. tour ===
This tour, produced by the Troika Organization, was a non-union bus & truck playing mostly one-nighters and split week engagements primarily in smaller markets. The production, which ran for two years, was directed by Ray DeMatteis with choreography by Tony Parise and music direction by Helen Gregory. The original cast featured Randy Bobish (Danny Zuko), Nicole Greenwood (Sandy Dumbrowski), Gary Martin (Kenickie), Christine Hudman (Betty Rizzo), Timothy Quinlan (Roger), Kimberly Wharton (Jan), Bruce Smith (Doody), Kathleen Connolly (Frenchy), Jeffrey Shubart (Sonny LaTierri) James Keith Posey (Sonny LaTierri), Laura Hornberger (Marty), Debbie Damp (Patty Simcox), Michael Giambrone (Eugene Florczyk), Juan Betancourt (Johnny Casino), Jamie Patterson (Teen Angel), Holly Ann Kling (Cha-Cha DiGregorio) and Steven Sackman (Vince Fontaine). Frankie Avalon starred as the Teen Angel for a one-week engagement at the Jackie Gleason Theater in Miami Beach (December 10–15, 1996).

=== 2003 U.S. tour ===
This tour was directed by Ray DeMattis and featured choreography by Christopher Gattelli. The cast starred Frankie Avalon as the Angel, with Jamey Isenor (Danny Zuko) and Hanna-Liina Võsa (Sandy Dumbrowski), Jason Harper (Roger), Danny Smith (Sonny LaTierri), John Ashley (Kenickie), Sarah Hubbard (Frenchy), Craig McEldowney (Doody), Kirsten Allyn Michaels (Marty), Jacqueline Colmer (Betty Rizzo), Cortney Harper (Jan) and Arthur J. Callahan (Vince Fontaine).

=== 2007 Broadway and London revivals and UK tours ===
A second Broadway revival, directed and choreographed by Kathleen Marshall, began previews at the Brooks Atkinson Theatre on July 24, 2007, and opened on August 19, 2007. Max Crumm and Laura Osnes were selected to portray Danny and Sandy via viewer votes cast during the run of the NBC reality series Grease: You're the One that I Want!. The original score includes four songs written for the film adaptation: "Hopelessly Devoted to You", "Sandy", "You're the One That I Want", and the title number. The Burger Palace Boys' name is the T-Birds in this revival. The production ended on January 4, 2009, after 31 previews and 554 performances. At the announcement of its closure, the producers revealed that the production recouped its entire investment during its 52nd playing week.

A West End revival opened at the Piccadilly Theatre, London on August 8, 2007, and ran for nearly four years (the longest running show in the Piccadilly Theatre's history). The leads were similarly cast via ITV's Grease Is the Word, with Danny Bayne and Susan McFadden playing Danny and Sandy. The production closed on April 30, 2011, after over 1,300 performances with a U.K. tour to begin on May 6, 2011, in Edinburgh.

The UK tour features Danny Bayne as Danny, Carina Gillespie as Sandy, Ricky Rojas as Kenickie, Kate Somerset How as Rizzo, Derek Andrews as Roger, Laura Wilson as Jan, Richard Vincent as Doody, Lauren Stroud as Frenchy, Josh Dever as Sonny, Lois Urwin as Marty, Darren John as Eugene, Sammy Kelly as Patty, Jason Capewell as Teen Angel/Vince Fontaine, Nancy Hill as Miss Lynch, and Sophie Zucchini as Cha Cha.

In 2017, Grease started touring the UK again, this time starring the Wanted's Tom Parker as Danny Zuko, BBC Over the Rainbow winner Danielle Hope as Sandy and Strictly Come Dancing's Louisa Lytton.

A further UK and Ireland tour of Grease was scheduled to commence from Curve, Leicester, on 30 July 2021. This production will star Peter Andre as Teen Angel and Vince Fontaine. The production will be directed by Nikolai Foster and choreographed by Arlene Phillips. It is unknown if this tour went to production or not, as it was repeatedly rescheduled from earlier 2021 dates as well as its originally scheduled tour in 2020, owing to the COVID-19 pandemic.

=== 2008 U.S. tour ===
A U.S. national tour began on December 2, 2008, in Providence, Rhode Island, and closed on May 23, 2010, at the Palace Theatre in Cleveland, Ohio. Taylor Hicks reprised his role as the Teen Angel after playing the part on Broadway, with Eric Schneider as Danny and Emily Padgett as Sandy. Lauren Ashley Zakrin replaced Emily Padgett as Sandy in October and Ace Young joined the tour as Danny on December 1, 2009.

=== 2011 Chicago revival - The Original Grease ===
In 2011, a revival of the original Kingston Mines production was run in Chicago. It was titled The Original Grease and carried the tagline "Restored. Revised. R-Rated. Returned to Chicago". It featured songs and scenes from drafts of both the original Chicago and Broadway productions. Unlike the school version, this version reinstated the raunchiness of the original show and references to Chicago locations. The sixth Burger Palace Boy was restored and named Miller. The Chicago production of The Original Grease opened on May 2 and closed on August 21. This version was presented once more in Australia in 2016 from April 6 to May 7. In Chicago, Adrian Aguilar played Danny and Kelly Davis Wilson played Sandy.

=== 2019 UK and Ireland tour and 2022/2023 London runs ===
A new production of Grease ran from 17 May to 29 October 2022 at the Dominion Theatre in London's West End, following a UK and Ireland tour in 2019–2021. This revival was directed by Nikolai Foster (artistic director of the Curve) and choreographed by Arlene Phillips, with scenic and costume design by Colin Richmond, orchestrations and musical supervision by Sarah Travis, lighting by Ben Cracknell, projections by Douglas O'Connell, sound design by Tom Marshall and Richard Brooker, and casting by David Grindrod. The production played a return engagement at the Dominion Theatre from 2 June to 28 October 2023.

=== International productions ===
There have been professional productions of Grease in Argentina (with Florencia Peña and Gustavo Monje), Austria (with Pia Douwes) and Canada (a 1998 French spoken/English sung version incorporating songs from the movie starring Marina Orsini as Rizzo and Serge Postigo as Danny).

In 1984, the Mexican [then pre-teen] pop band Timbiriche starred in the musical, with Sasha Sokol and Benny Ibarra in the leading roles, which was an overwhelming success. The band also released an album (Vaselina) featuring themes from the musical. The cast included other members of Timbiriche (Diego Schoening, Mariana Garza, Alix Bauer, Paulina Rubio and Erik Rubin), along with other child singers and actors such as Eduardo Capetillo, Stephanie Salas, Thalía, Edith Márquez, Lolita Cortés, Hector Suarez Gomis, Usi Velasco and Angélica Ruvalcaba. The musical was produced by the Mexican actress and producer Julissa.

In 1994, the musical was revived at the Hidalgo Theater in Mexico City, by producers Alejandro Ibarra and Julissa. The revival cast included Alejandro Ibarra, Juan Carlos Casasola, and Arturo G. Alvarez.

A Spanish revival ran successfully at Teatre Victòria, Barcelona, from October 3, 2006, to January 6, 2008. After a short national tour, the production was transferred to Teatro Nuevo Alcalá, Madrid, where it ran from October 14, 2008, to January 31, 2010, and then continued touring Spain until it finally closed on August 1, 2010, becoming one of Spain's all-time longest running musical productions, with 1,090 performances. Directed by Ricard Reguant, the original cast included Carlos Solano (later alternating the role with Tony Bernetti) as Danny Zuko, María Adamuz as Sandy (later replaced by Edurne and Gisela), and Elena Gadel as Betty Rizzo,

A New Zealand production, ran at the Civic Theatre in Auckland during August 2010. The production featured the South African cast, with Jonathan Roxmouth as Danny, Bethany Dickson as Sandy and Genna Galloway as Rizzo.

A second Spanish revival directed and choreographed by Coco Comín ran at Cúpula Las Arenas, Barcelona, from November 15, 2011, to January 22, 2012, and then was transferred to Teatro Coliseum, Madrid from March 6, 2012, to May 6, 2012, before starting a national tour. Edurne reprised the role of Sandy. During the Madrid run, the singer Julio Iglesias Jr. guest starred as Teen Angel in some performances.

In France, the first production of Grease opened in November 1999 at Palais des Sports in Paris. The production moved to the Dôme Disney Village in Chessy in 2005. The show was revived in 2008 at the Comédia in Paris with Cécilia Cara as Sandy. This new production won a Globe de Cristal Awards in 2009 and moved to Palais des congrès in 2009 and to Le Palace in 2012, after a break in 2011. A third revival opened on September 28, 2017 at Théâtre Mogador in Paris. It is the first production completely in French, the previous ones were in French with English songs. Despite originally being billed as a limited engagement, it was extended to July 8, 2018 following its success.

An Australian revival opened at Brisbane's Lyric Theatre on August 27, 2013, before heading on tour across the country. The cast included Rob Mills as Danny, Gretel Scarlett as Sandy, Anthony Callea as Johnny Casino, Stephen Mahy as Kenickie, Lucy Maunder as Rizzo, Todd McKenney as Teen Angel, and Bert Newton as Vince Fontaine.

In 2016 a 90-minute version of the show premiered on Royal Caribbeans Harmony of the Seas in May and Independence of the Seas in July.

A June 2022 Australian production, directed by Drew Anthony and choreographed by Jamie and Susie Rolton, was staged at Perth's Royale Theatre, with John Berry as Danny, Elaina O'Connor as Sandy, Peter Cumins as Teen Angel, Blake Williams as Vince Fontaine and Lucy Williamson as Miss Lynch.

A 2023-24 Australian tour production, directed by Luke Joslin and choreographed by Eric Giancola was announced in May 2023. The principal cast was later revealed in June 2023 with Patti Newton as Miss Lynch, Marcia Hines as Teen Angel, Jay Laga’aia as Vince Fontaine, Annelise Hall as Sandy and Joseph Spanti as Danny Zuko.

== Adaptations ==
=== Film ===
The Robert Stigwood Organization adapted Grease into a 1978 feature film, directed by Randal Kleiser. John Travolta, who had played Doody on Broadway and the national tour, performed as lead Danny Zuko, while Olivia Newton-John, an English Australian country-pop singer, was cast as Sandy; to accommodate the casting move, the character was rewritten as Australian immigrant Sandy Olsson (named after the maiden name of Ann-Margret, who was briefly considered for the role in the film), and parts of the score were replaced. Substantial portions of the script — which included replaced or reduced supporting character roles and added on-screen roles for characters unseen in the stage version — were written in by Bronte Woodard.

Grease was a major success both for Stigwood and for Paramount Pictures, the latter of which re-released the film several times; the film soundtrack made international hits out of several of the songs. Paramount also produced a sequel Grease 2 in 1982, which featured a younger class of students at Rydell High School led by Maxwell Caulfield and Michelle Pfeiffer. Grease 2 was both a financial disappointment and a critical failure that Jim Jacobs disowned after its release. In the 2010s, work began on expanding the Grease brand into a full-fledged media franchise, with two prequels in production, Summer Lovin' (a film focusing on Danny and Sandy's summer before the events of the original Grease) and Rise of the Pink Ladies (a television series documenting the ascent of the Pink Ladies clique).

=== Television production ===
On January 31, 2016, in the wake of similar productions that NBC had performed for other musicals, Fox broadcast a live production of Grease, known as Grease: Live, as a television special starring Julianne Hough, Aaron Tveit, Vanessa Hudgens and Jordan Fisher.

=== Grease: The Immersive Movie Musical ===
An immersive theatrical experience based on the film opened at Evolution London in Battersea Park in the summer of 2025, and returned to the same venue in July 2026.

== Synopsis ==
Because of changes to the musical that have been made since the 1978 film adaptation, several variants exist. In the event two songs are listed at any given point, the first is from the 1972 Off-Broadway version, and the second is from revivals that use the film music, such as the 2007 version.

=== Act I ===
At revivals that use the 1978 song "Grease", it is typically inserted at or near the beginning of the show.

At the Rydell High Class of 1959 reunion ("Alma Mater"), old maid English teacher Miss Lynch introduces former cheerleader/yearbook-editor Patty Simcox Honeywell and class valedictorian Eugene Florczyk. Eugene gives a rousing speech, mentioning that the alumni who are missing from the reunion are surely present in spirit. The scene segues to bring in the greaser gang known as the Burger Palace Boys (known in later versions as the "T-Birds") and their auxiliary, the "Pink Ladies", as they sing a cruder version of the Rydell alma mater ("Alma Mater (Parody)").

Flashing back to the first day of high school in fall 1958, the Pink Ladies sit in the lunchroom, and the Burger Palace Boys sit at the entrance to the school. One of the Pink Ladies, Frenchy, introduces her new neighbor Sandy Dumbrowski, who had been unjustly rejected from a Catholic school, to the others (Marty, Jan and Rizzo), as well as Patty. Sandy tells of how she had a brief love affair the summer before, which ended with unresolved love. Meanwhile, womanizing greaser Danny Zuko is telling the Burger Palace Boys (Kenickie, Roger, Doody and Sonny) the story of his own summer fling ("Summer Nights"). The Pink Ladies soon after realize that Sandy's summer fling was the same Danny Zuko who attends Rydell High and arrange for the two to bump into each other at school; the resulting meeting is tense and awkward, as Danny had previously told Sandy that he attended Lake Forest Academy and does not want to admit to the Burger Palace Boys that she was the woman he was talking about. As the Burger Palace Boys leave, Sandy is hurt and angry, but the Pink Ladies cheer her up, by inviting her over to Marty's pajama party.

Shortly afterwards, the teenagers gather in the hall as Doody shows off his new guitar and performs a song ("Those Magic Changes").

At Marty's pajama party, the girls experiment with wine, cigarettes, pierce their ears and talk about boys. The sheltered Sandy goes into shock and falls ill from seeing blood when the Pink Ladies try to pierce her ears, leading them to mock her when she is not in the room (in some revivals, the song "Look at Me, I'm Sandra Dee" is placed here, mirroring the film). Marty tells about her long-distance courtship with a Marine named Freddy and it is implied that she maintains it only because of the lavish gifts he sends her from Japan ("Freddy, My Love").

That same night, the Burger Palace Boys are busy stealing hubcaps, unaware that the hubcaps are on Kenickie's car, Greased Lightnin'. Unfazed by the others' skepticism, Kenickie sings of the upgrades needed to make the car a racing-worthy chick magnet ("Greased Lightnin'").

Danny sees Sandy again at her cheerleader practice, and tries to apologize for his behavior. Patty interrupts and flirts with Danny. She informs Danny that track try-outs are nearing, and Danny tells Sandy that he will join the track team to prove himself; he leaves as Patty and Sandy practice cheering ("Rydell Fight Song").

As the Burger Palace Boys and Pink Ladies gather at the park, Danny reveals to the rest of the greasers that he has joined the track team, much to their dismay and skepticism. After Roger and Jan bicker about food, drink, and religion, Jan asks him how he earned the nickname Rump; he explains that, as "King of the Mooners", he has a hobby of baring his backside to unsuspecting victims, and in the process, both reveal their affections for each other ("Mooning"). Rizzo teases Danny for falling for a girl who resembles the excessively proper teenage ingénue, Sandra Dee, and the other greasers join in as she makes fun of Sandy, who has not arrived at the picnic yet ("Look at Me, I'm Sandra Dee").

Sandy, working on a biology assignment with Eugene, comes in just as the greasers finish making fun of her. She attacks Rizzo in a fit of rage and erroneously assumes Danny is the one behind the mockery. Furious, she tells Danny that she wishes she never met him and storms out of the picnic. Danny shrugs off Sandy's negative response, and the greasers pair off for the upcoming sock hop. Danny teases Marty for not having a date (recommending Eugene), and the greasers all laugh ("We Go Together").

For revivals that use "Hopelessly Devoted to You", the exact placement varies. It sometimes replaces the first rendition of "We Go Together" and in other examples, such as the 2007 revival, it is placed early in Act II.

=== Act II ===
The night of the sock hop arrives ("Shakin' At the High School Hop"). Sandy is at home by herself, listening to the radio and crying over how much she misses Danny ("It's Raining on Prom Night").

Meanwhile, Kenickie comes into the dance with his date, Cha-Cha DiGregorio, a girl from Saint Bernadette's Academy. Patty tries to pair up with Danny, trash-talking Sandy's cheerleading skills in the process, but is unable to get out of her promise to dance with Eugene despite Rizzo trying to seduce Eugene as a distraction. Kenickie ends up paired off with Rizzo, and Danny with Cha-Cha. The MC Vince Fontaine, a radio disc jockey, begins the hand jive dance contest, and everyone eagerly participates as he tags the contestants out ("Born to Hand Jive"). In the end, Danny and Cha-Cha are the winners. Amongst the awards given to the couple, Danny receives two free drive-in movie tickets.

Sometime later outside of the Burger Palace hangout, Kenickie, Doody, and Sonny run into Frenchy. The boys are armed with an "arsenal" of household items and reveal that, to their surprise, Cha-Cha was the girlfriend of someone in the boys' rival gang, the Flaming Dukes; the Dukes, hearing of Cha-Cha's dancing with the Burger Palace Boys, challenged the boys to a rumble. Danny sprints into the scene wearing his track suit, to the disbelief of the other boys. Danny tells the boys he cannot partake in the rumble because of a track meet and sprints off.

The three remaining boys go into the Burger Palace for a snack before the fight, and Frenchy laments at what to do with her life, having dropped out of beauty school in frustration at failing all of her classes. The heavenly Teen Angel appears with a chorus of back-up singing angels and tells her to return to high school ("Beauty School Dropout").

The three boys exit the Burger Palace, bemoaning Danny's betrayal while only halfheartedly noticing Roger is unaccounted for. They wait for the Flaming Dukes, but the rival gang never turns up. Roger finally turns up with only a broken antenna as a weapon; in response, the other three proceed to strip Roger of his pants and shoes.

At the drive-in, Danny tries to make up for his behavior and offers Sandy his class ring. She initially is thrilled, but pulls back and exits the car when he tries to move beyond a kiss. Danny laments his loneliness ("Alone at a Drive-In Movie" or "Sandy").

Several days later, Sandy and the greasers — without Danny — are gathered in Jan's basement ("Rock 'N' Roll Party Queen"). Rizzo, who missed her period, fears she is pregnant and tells Marty (who herself laments that Vince tried to spike her drink at the dance) that the father is a stranger who had sex with her with a cheap, broken condom; word gets back to everyone else. The boys offer support as they leave; Rizzo rejects it, leading Sandy to ask her why and presume that Kenickie is the father. Rizzo responds by saying that she is a better person than others make her out to be and that showing weakness is the worst thing she knows ("There Are Worse Things I Could Do"). Rizzo leaves, and Sandy decides what she needs to do to fit in with the greasers ("Look at Me, I'm Sandra Dee" (Reprise)).

The next day, the boys are hanging out at the Burger Palace. A dejected Patty reveals Danny, who follows her in, has reverted to his old ways and quit the track team. Sandy comes in alongside the Pink Ladies, having transformed herself from an innocent schoolgirl into a greaser's fantasy, punching out a dismayed Patty. Danny is delighted at this change and the couple express their mutual feelings for each other ("All Choked Up" or "You're the One That I Want").

Afterwards, the greasers prepare to head to Roger's to watch The Mickey Mouse Club, inviting Patty along. Frenchy takes a job as a makeup saleswoman at Woolworth's, Rizzo reveals that she is not pregnant, and she and Kenickie reunite. All ends happily, and the Burger Palace Boys, the Pink Ladies, Sandy, and Patty sing about how they will always be friends to the end ("We Go Together" (Reprise)).

=== Revival changes ===
Because of the popularity of the 1978 film adaptation, which made several changes to the musical's songs and themes (many to accommodate its casting choice of the singer Olivia Newton-John as Sandy), the subsequent revivals adopted several of the changes made in the film, particularly the replacement of several songs, Sandy's portrayal with blonde hair instead of the original brunette, and the renaming of the Burger Palace Boys to their film name, the T-Birds. However, in the revival, the role of Sandy Dumbrowski is not changed from the original Broadway production.

=== School version ===
In order to make the original musical suitable for young performers and audiences, Jim Jacobs decided to write a "school version" of the musical. This edition eliminates all of the references to cigarettes and alcohol, and also any swearing or bad language. Most of the songs have also undergone changes as well; the numbers are all shortened greatly and edited for content/language. Some plot lines are missing from the school version, such as Rizzo's pregnancy and her song "There Are Worse Things I Could Do." This section is entirely cut from the script and score. The beginning of the pajama party in Marty's bedroom is also cut. (In this version, the Pink Ladies do not offer Sandy cigarettes or wine. Instead it begins directly with piercing her ears.) Overall, this version is considered to be G-rated.

In addition to the removal of "There Are Worse Things I Could Do", the following songs of the School Version have undergone lyric changes:

- "Alma Mater Parody"
- "Summer Nights"
- "Freddy, My Love"
- "Greased Lightnin'"
- "Look at Me, I'm Sandra Dee"
- "Beauty School Dropout"

The remainder of the songs have been greatly edited for time, deleting several verses from the original songs.

A version of the play is available that keeps some of the adult references and innuendo but excises some of the more explicit lyrics.

== Cast and characters ==
- Danny Zuko: A smooth greaser from Chicago and successful womanizer, the de facto leader of the Burger Palace Boys has his life upended when he falls for a straitlaced square during his summer vacation leading into senior year. Danny was based upon Tom Meyer, Jacobs's cousin.
- Sandra "Sandy" Dumbrowski: An ingénue when she moves into the neighborhood, she experiences severe culture shock as she learns her summer boyfriend's true nature but eventually transforms into Danny's fantasy dame after she is unable to resist her continued attraction to him. Renamed with surname "Olsson" for the film and "Young" for the 2016 TV production. Sandy was based upon Meyer's high school girlfriend, Jeanie Kozemczak. Jacobs noted that Meyer and Kozemczak broke up after high school and that Meyer never fully got over her, while Kozemczak eventually married another man.
- Betty Rizzo: Described by Jim Jacobs as a "tough little Italian", Rizzo is the cynical leader of the Pink Ladies and a strong alpha female who embraces the low culture and refuses to show her feelings. While she is condescending toward almost everyone, she and Danny have a particularly longstanding hostility toward each other, and she openly mocks Sandy in song.
- Kenickie: A hard-nosed tough guy, Kenickie has great pride in his investment, a used car he has named Greased Lightnin'. He has a tempestuous on-again, off-again relationship with Rizzo and is often at odds with Roger. Kenickie is given a larger role in the film as Danny's best friend. He was named Miller in the original Chicago production.
- Doody: A member of the Burger Palace Boys, Doody has some childlike mannerisms and is shown to have great difficulty when approaching his crush, Frenchy, or handling tense situations. He fantasizes about being a great rock-and-roll guitarist. Doody was one of two characters based upon Jacobs himself, representing his more innocent side.
- Roger "Rump": A sardonic yet very self-confident Burger Palace Boy who is easily able to win over Jan and willing to go into a rumble with only a whip antenna as a weapon. He is frequently seen eating fast food and earned his nickname because he was a proficient mooner. He is stated to be a Roman Catholic. Roger is the other character Jacobs based upon himself, representing his more confident side. Rump does not appear in the film or television versions. Putzie, a non-singing character, appears in Rump's stead (though ostensibly sharing the legal first name Roger), and his songs are included on the film's soundtrack, performed by Louis St. Louis.
- Dominic "Sonny" LaTierri: The only member of the Burger Palace Boys without a musical number, Sonny is a character who imagines himself a Casanova, but most high-school girls find him repulsive. He is also quite cowardly, wilting in the face of any criticism.
- Miller: The sixth member of the Burger Palace Boys, he appeared in the original 1971 production but was cut before the show opened on Broadway. He was named Kenickie in the original Chicago production. Though he did not appear in any subsequent productions, he appeared in The Original Grease.
- Frenchy: A member of the Pink Ladies, Frenchy is the first person (other than Danny) to meet Sandy, and the two quickly become friends. She claims to have earned her nickname from being able to "French inhale" a cigarette. She is a very poor student with aspirations of becoming a beautician, but she is equally inept when she drops out to attend beauty school.
- Marty: Given the surname "Maraschino" in the film, Marty is a seasoned member of the Pink Ladies, with much experience in wine, men and cigarettes, and is bigoted against the Japanese and Polish. In Act One, she is said to be engaged to an overseas Marine, mainly because of the expensive gifts she receives by maintaining the relationship. In Act Two, she has a brief fling with DJ Vince Fontaine, and by the end she succumbs to Sonny's advances.
- Jan: A member of the Pink Ladies, Jan is a quirky Lutheran who has a voracious appetite and has moments of extreme bluntness. Jamie Donnelly, who played Jan in the film, described her as not being as cool as the other Pink Ladies. She and Roger develop a relationship over the course of the musical, but the two frequently bicker.
- Miss Lynch: A spinster English teacher and stereotypical disciplinarian. Her character role would be rewritten as Principal McGee for screen adaptions.
- Eugene Florczyk: The class valedictorian is usually portrayed as an awkward nerd. He goes on to become a marketing executive after high school. Renamed Felsnick for the film.
- Patricia "Patty" Simcox: A high-achieving cheerleader who befriends Sandy early in the show. Patty holds her own attractions to Danny and is especially drawn to him when he tries to change to please Sandy. Other than Rizzo (who at first treats her with contempt), the greasers are amicable with her, while acknowledging their different social cliques. At the beginning of the play, it is noted that she has since gone on to marry a Mr. Honeywell and have a successful career.
- Charlene "Cha-Cha" DiGregorio: she appears at the school dance as Kenickie's date, later ends up dancing with Danny, and is ultimately revealed as the girlfriend of a rival greaser gang member.
- Vince Fontaine: the smooth-talking 19-year-old disc jockey and Rydell High alumnus whose voice-overs serve as continuity for the musical. He appears on-stage during the school dance and serves as an on-air host at WAXX, the local top-40 radio station.
- Johnny Casino and the Gamblers: a low-rent rock and roll band that plays at the school dance.
- Teen Angel: Frenchy's guardian angel who has blunt advice for his charge.

A number of characters in the musical are not seen: Freddy Strulka, Marty's boyfriend and a member of the United States Marine Corps who showers Marty with lavish gifts from Japan; the coach of the track team; the Flaming Dukes, an adversary of the Burger Palace Boys who never show up to a threatened rumble; and Mr. Drucker, a perverted economics teacher who has made passes at the Pink Ladies. In the film, the Flaming Dukes are renamed the Scorpions and have an on-screen role, as does the track coach (who is surnamed Calhoun and is portrayed by Sid Caesar).

=== Notable cast members ===
Role	Chicago	Broadway	West End	West End Revival	Broadway Revival		West End Revival		
Role	1971	1972	1973	1993	1994	2007	2007	2022	2023
Danny	Doug Stevenson	Barry Bostwick	Richard Gere	Craig McLachlan	Ricky Paull Goldin	Max Crumm	Danny Bayne	Dan Partridge	Dan Partridge
Sandy	Leslie Goto	Carole Demas	Stacey Gregg	Debbie Gibson	Susan Wood	Laura Osnes	Susan McFadden	Olivia Moore	Olivia Moore
Rizzo	Susan Williams	Adrienne Barbeau	Jacquie-Ann Carr	Sally Ann Triplett	Rosie O'Donnell	Jenny Powers	Jayde Westaby	Jocasta Almgill	Jocasta Almgill
Kenickie	Bruce Hickey	Timothy Meyers	Peter Armitage	Shane Richie	Jason Opsahl	Matthew Saldivar	Sean Mulligan	Paul French	Solomon Davy
Doody	James Canning	James Canning	Derek James	John Combe	Sam Harris	Ryan Patrick Binder	Lee Martin	Jake Reynolds	Jake Reynolds
Roger	Gary Houston	Walter Bobbie	Stephen Bent	Drew Jaymson	Hunter Foster	Daniel Everidge	Richard Hardwick	Noah Harrison	Callum Henderson
Sonny	Gerald Bolnick	Jim Borrelli	Doug Fisher	Richard Calkin	Carlos Lopez	José Restrepo	Bennett Andrews	Damon Gould	George Michaelides
Frenchy	Hedda Lubin	Marya Small	Felicity Harrison	Jo Bingham	Jessica Stone	Kirsten Wyatt	Alana Phillips	Eloise Davies	Olivia Foster-Browne
Marty	Marilu Henner	Katie Hanley	Hilary Labow	Charlotte Avery	Megan Mullally	Robyn Hurder	Charlie Cameron	Lizzy-Rose Esin-Kelly	Ellie Kingdon
Jan	Sheila Ray Ceaser	Garn Stephens	Colette Kelly	Liz Ewing	Heather Stokes	Lindsay Mendez	Laurie Scarth	Mary Moore	Katie Brace
Miss Lynch	Judy Brubaker	Dorothy Leon	Ann Way	Myra Sands	Marcia Lewis	Susan Blommaert	Marie Daly	Corinna Powlesland	Rachel Stanley
Eugene	Steve Munro	Tom Harris	Stephen Marsh	Aidan Treays	Paul Castree	Jamison Scott	Tim Newman	Darnell Mathew-James	Jayd’n Tyrone
Patty	Polly Pen	Ilene Kristen	Claire Faulcon Bridge	Tamzin Outhwaite	Michelle Blakely	Allison Fischer	Siobhan Dillon	Jessica Croll	Chloe Saunders
Cha-Cha	Barbara Munro	Kathi Moss	Olwen Hughes	Heather Robbins	Sandra Purpuro	Natalie Hill	Olivia Kate Ward	Katie Lee	Katie Ella Dunsden
Vince Fontaine	Mike O'Connor	Don Billett	Roy Desmond	Gary Martin	Brian Bradley	Jeb Brown	Jason Capewell	Peter Andre	Peter Andre; Darren Bennett
Johnny Casino	Bob Santelli	Alan Paul	Steve Alder	Glenn Carter	n/a	n/a	n/a	Ronan James Burns	Liam McHugh
Teen Angel	Mac Hamilton	Alan Paul	Steve Alder	Andrew Kennedy	Billy Porter	Stephen R. Buntrock	Jason Capewell	Peter Andre; Jason Donovan	Peter Andre; Jason Donovan; Louise Redknapp

=== Notable cast replacements ===
==== Broadway (1972–1980) ====
- Danny Zuko: Jeff Conaway, Treat Williams, Greg Evigan, Patrick Swayze, Adrian Zmed, Peter Gallagher, Michael Tucci (u/s), Richard Gere (u/s), Philip Casnoff (u/s), Ted Wass (u/s), Rex Smith (u/s), Tom Wiggin (u/s)
- Sandy Dumbrowski: Candice Earley, Ilene Graff, Randy Graff (u/s)
- Betty Rizzo: Joy Garrett, Randee Heller, Judy Kaye, Marcia Mitzman Gaven, Randy Graff (u/s)
- Kenickie: Jerry Zaks, Michael Tucci, Paul Regina, Tom Wiggin, Jeff Conaway (u/s), Richard Gere (u/s), Philip Casnoff (u/s), Ted Wass (u/s), Greg Evigan (u/s)
- Doody: John Travolta, Scott Ellis, Jeff Conaway (u/s), Michael Tucci (u/s), Philip Casnoff (u/s), Ted Wass (u/s), Greg Evigan (u/s)
- Roger: Michael Tucci, Jeff Conaway (u/s), Richard Gere (u/s), Philip Casnoff (u/s), Ted Wass (u/s), Greg Evigan (u/s)
- Sonny Latierri: Richard Gere, David Paymer, Jeff Conaway (u/s), Michael Tucci (u/s), Philip Casnoff (u/s), Ted Wass (u/s), Greg Evigan (u/s)
- Frenchy: Garn Stephens, Laurie Graff, Randy Graff (u/s)
- Marty: Meg Bennett, Marilu Henner, Char Fontane, Randy Graff (u/s)
- Jan: Jamie Donnelly, Randee Heller, Mimi Kennedy, Cynthia Darlow, Randy Graff (u/s)
- Miss Lynch: Sudie Bond, Randy Graff (u/s)
- Eugene Florczyk: Jeff Conaway (u/s), Michael Tucci (u/s), Richard Gere (u/s), Philip Casnoff (u/s), Ted Wass (u/s), Greg Evigan (u/s)
- Patty Simcox: Randy Graff (u/s)
- Cha-Cha Di Gregorio: Randy Graff (u/s)
- Vince Fontaine: Walter Charles, Nick Wyman, Jeff Conaway (u/s), Michael Tucci (u/s), Richard Gere (u/s), Philip Casnoff (u/s), Ted Wass (u/s), Greg Evigan (u/s)
- Johnny Casino: Philip Casnoff, Jeff Conaway (u/s), Michael Tucci (u/s), Richard Gere (u/s), Ted Wass (u/s), Greg Evigan (u/s)
- Teen Angel: Michael Tucci, Philip Casnoff, Jeff Conaway (u/s), Richard Gere (u/s), Ted Wass (u/s), Greg Evigan (u/s)

==== West End (1973–1974) ====
- Danny Zuko: Paul Nicholas
- Sandy Dumbrowski: Elaine Paige

==== West End Revival (1993–1994) ====
- Danny Zuko: Luke Goss, Ian Kelsey, Darren Day, Glenn Carter
- Sandy Dumbrowski: Samantha Janus
- Betty Rizzo: Anna-Jane Casey, Linzi Hateley
- Kenickie: Ben Richards
- Jan: Anna-Jane Casey
- Johnny Casino: Ben Richards

==== Broadway Revival (1994–1998) ====
- Danny Zuko: Adrian Zmed, Jeff Trachta, Jon Secada, Joseph Barbara, Hunter Foster (u/s)
- Sandy Dumbrowski: Sutton Foster
- Betty Rizzo: Maureen McCormick, Brooke Shields, Debby Boone, Jody Watley, Sheena Easton, Linda Blair, Mackenzie Phillips, Lucy Lawless, Jasmine Guy, Tracy Nelson, Joely Fisher, Debbie Gibson, Sandra Purpuro (u/s), Megan Mullally (u/s)
- Kenickie: Hunter Foster (u/s)
- Doody: Ty Taylor, Brad Kane
- Sonny Latierri: Brad Kane
- Frenchy: Monica Lee Gradischek, Jennifer Cody (u/s)
- Marty: Sherie Rene Scott, Amanda Watkins
- Jan: Marissa Jaret Winokur, Farah Alvin (u/s)
- Miss Lynch: Dody Goodman, Mimi Hines, Marilyn Cooper, Jo Anne Worley, Sally Struthers, Farah Alvin (u/s)
- Patty Simcox: Dominique Dawes
- Cha-Cha Di Gregorio: Jennifer Cody
- Vince Fontaine: Bruce Morrow, Micky Dolenz, Jeff Conaway, Joe Piscopo, Dave Konig
- Teen Angel: Al Jarreau, Chubby Checker, Mary Bond Davis, Darlene Love, Jennifer Holliday, Hunter Foster (u/s)

==== West End Revival (2007–2011) ====
- Sandy Dumbrowski: Siobhan Dillon, Lauren Samuels, Michelle Visage
- Marty: Siobhan Dillon (u/s), Chrissie Hynde (u/s)

==== Broadway Revival (2007–2009) ====
- Sandy Dumbrowski: Ashley Spencer, Emily Padgett (u/s), Christina Rose (u/s)
- Betty Rizzo: Janine DiVita
- Kenickie: Ace Young
- Marty: Heléne Yorke, Christina Rose (u/s)
- Patty Simcox: Emily Padgett (u/s), Christina Rose (u/s)
- Teen Angel: Taylor Hicks

== Musical numbers ==
=== Original Chicago production ===
Act I

- "Alma Mater" – Miss Lynch, Dr. Devlin, Eugene and Alumni
- "Alma Mater (Reprise)" – Company
- "Foster Beach" – Danny, Sandy, Burger Palace Boys and Pink Ladies
- "Yeeughh!" – Patty
- "Freddy, My Love" – Marty and Pink Ladies
- "Greased Lightnin'" – Miller and Burger Palace Boys
- "Mooning" – Roger and Jan
- "Look at Me, I'm Sandra Dee" – Rizzo
- "We Go Together" – Company

Act II

- "Grease"* – Company
- "It's Raining on Prom Night" – Sandy
- "Shakin' at the High School Hop" – Johnny Casino and The Gamblers
- "Boogie Man Boogie" – Johnny Casino and The Gamblers
- "Beauty School Dropout" – Teen Angel and Heavenly Choir
- "Rock Progression" – Doody
- "There Are Worse Things I Could Do" – Rizzo
- "In My Day" – Miss Lynch
- "Kiss It" – Sandy and Pink Ladies
- "Grease (Reprise)" – Company

* Not to be confused with Frankie Valli's song of the same name.

=== Original Broadway production ===
Act I

- "Alma Mater" – Miss Lynch, Patty, Eugene and Company
- "Alma Mater (Parody)" – Pink Ladies and Burger Palace Boys
- "Summer Nights" – Sandy, Danny, Pink Ladies and Burger Palace Boys
- "Those Magic Changes" – Doody, Pink Ladies and Burger Palace Boys
- "Freddy, My Love" – Marty and Pink Ladies
- "Greased Lightnin'" – Kenickie and Burger Palace Boys
- "Rydell Fight Song" – Sandy and Patty
- "Mooning" – Roger and Jan
- "Look at Me, I'm Sandra Dee" – Pink Ladies and Rizzo
- "We Go Together" – Company

Act II

- "Shakin' at the High School Hop" – Company
- "It's Raining on Prom Night" – Sandy and Radio Singer
- "Shakin' at the High School Hop (Reprise)" – Company
- "Born to Hand Jive" – Johnny Casino and Company
- "Beauty School Dropout" – Teen Angel, Frenchy and Choir
- "Alone at a Drive-in Movie" – Danny and Burger Palace Boys
- "Rock 'N' Roll Party Queen" – Doody and Roger
- "There Are Worse Things I Could Do" – Rizzo
- "Look at Me, I'm Sandra Dee (Reprise)" – Sandy
- "All Choked Up" – Sandy, Danny, Pink Ladies and Burger Palace Boys
- "We Go Together (Reprise)" – Company

* The 1972 version is the standard version licensed to professionals and amateurs through Samuel French, Inc. in the US and Theatrical Rights Worldwide Ltd in the UK/IE/Europe

=== 1993 West End revival ===
Act I

- "Sandy" – Danny and Sandy
- "Grease" – Company
- "Summer Nights" – Sandy, Danny, Pink Ladies, T-Birds
- "Those Magic Changes" – Doody and T-Birds
- "Freddy, My Love" – Marty and Pink Ladies
- "Look at Me, I'm Sandra Dee" – Rizzo
- "Greased Lightnin'" – Kenickie and T-Birds
- "Rydell Fight Song" – Sandy, Patty and Girls
- "Mooning" – Roger and Jan
- "We Go Together" – Pink Ladies and T-Birds

Act II

- "Shakin' at the High School Hop" – The Company
- "It's Raining on Prom Night" – Sandy and Donna Sue
- "Born to Hand Jive" – Johnny Casino and Company
- "Hopelessly Devoted to You"* – Sandy
- "Beauty School Dropout" – Teen Angel and Female Angels
- "Sandy"* – Danny
- "Rock 'N' Roll Party Queen" – Doody and Roger
- "There Are Worse Things I Could Do" – Rizzo
- "Look at Me, I'm Sandra Dee (Reprise)" – Sandy
- "You're the One That I Want"* – Danny, Sandy, Pink Ladies, and T-Birds
- "Finale" – The Company

=== 1994 Broadway revival ===
Act I

- "Alma Mater (We Go Together)" – Company
- "We Go Together" – Kids, Pink Ladies and Burger Palace Boys
- "Summer Nights" – Sandy, Danny, Pink Ladies, Burger Palace Boys, Eugene and Patty
- "Those Magic Changes" – Doody and Burger Palace Boys
- "Freddy, My Love" – Marty and Pink Ladies
- "Greased Lightnin'" – Kenickie and Burger Palace Boys
- "Greased Lightnin' (Reprise)" – Rizzo and Burger Palace Boys
- "Rydell Fight Song" – Sandy and Patty
- "Mooning" – Roger and Jan
- "Look at Me, I'm Sandra Dee" – Rizzo
- "Since I Don't Have You" – Sandy
- "We Go Together" – Pink Ladies and Burger Palace Boys

Act II

- "Shakin' at the High School Hop" – The Company
- "It's Raining on Prom Night" – Sandy, Jan and Radio Singers
- "Shakin' at the High School Hop (Reprise)" – Orchestra and Kids
- "Born to Hand Jive" – Johnny Casino and Company
- "Beauty School Dropout" – Teen Angel and Female Angels
- "Alone at a Drive-in Movie" – Danny and Burger Palace Boys
- "Rock 'N' Roll Party Queen" – Doody and Kenickie
- "There Are Worse Things I Could Do" – Rizzo
- "Look at Me, I'm Sandra Dee (Reprise)" – Sandy and Rizzo
- "Finale Medley" (includes "All Choked Up") – Cast

=== 2007 Broadway revival ===
Act I

- "Prologue" – Instrumental
- "Grease"* – Company
- "Summer Nights" – Sandy, Danny, T-Birds, Pink Ladies, Company
- "Those Magic Changes" – Doody, T-Birds, Ensemble
- "Freddy, My Love" – Marty and Pink Ladies
- "Greased Lightnin'" – Kenickie, Danny, T-Birds, Boys
- "Rydell Fight Song" – Sandy and Patty
- "Mooning" – Roger and Jan
- "Look at Me, I'm Sandra Dee" – Rizzo
- "We Go Together" – Company

Act II

- "Shakin' at the High School Hop" – The Company
- "It's Raining on Prom Night" – Sandy and Jan
- "Born to Hand Jive" – Vince Fontaine and Company
- "Hopelessly Devoted to You"* – Sandy
- "Beauty School Dropout" – Teen Angel and Female Angels
- "Sandy"* – Danny
- "Rock 'N' Roll Party Queen" – Doody and Roger
- "There Are Worse Things I Could Do" – Rizzo
- "Look at Me, I'm Sandra Dee (Reprise)" – Sandy
- "You're the One That I Want"* – Danny, Sandy, Company
- "We Go Together (Reprise)" – Full Company
- "Grease Medley" – Full Company

Note*: "Grease Medley" is sung during the final curtain call.

* The 2007 revival incorporates some changes from the popular film version. Some numbers were eliminated, and others were added to the score: "Grease" was written by Barry Gibb, "Hopelessly Devoted to You" and "You're the One That I Want" are written by John Farrar, and "Sandy" is by Louis St. Louis and Scott Simon. These additional songs require a separate license from the Robert Stigwood Organisation.

=== 2022 West End Revival ===
Act I

- "Prologue" - Danny and Sandy
- "Grease"* – Company
- "Summer Nights" – Danny, Sandy, Burger Palace Boys, Pink Ladies
- "Freddy, My Love" – Marty and Pink Ladies
- "Greased Lightnin'" – Kenickie and Burger Palace Boys
- "Greased Lightnin' (Reprise)" – Rizzo
- “Tattoo Song” — Danny and Burger Palace Boys
- "Rydell Fight Song" – Sandy and Patty
- “How Big I’m Gonna Be” — Danny
- "Mooning" – Roger and Jan
- "Look at Me, I'm Sandra Dee" – Rizzo
- "We Go Together" – Company

Act II

- "Grease"** - Company
- "Shakin' at the High School Hop" – Johnny Casino and Company
- "It's Raining on Prom Night" (Instrumental)
- "Born to Hand-Jive" – Vince Fontaine and Company
- "Hopelessly Devoted to You" - Sandy
- "Beauty School Dropout" – Teen Angel and Angels
- "Sandy" - Danny
- "Rock 'N' Roll Party Queen" – Burger Palace Boys
- "Those Magic Changes" - Doody
- "There Are Worse Things I Could Do" – Rizzo
- "Look at Me, I'm Sandra Dee (Reprise)" – Sandy
- "You're The One That I Want" – Danny, Sandy, Company
- "We Go Together (Reprise)" – Company
- "Megamix" - Company

* "Grease", written by Barry Gibb. Not to be confused with the song by Jim Jacobs and Warren Casey, also featured in this production.
** "Grease", written by Jim Jacobs and Warren Casey. Not to be confused with the song of the same name, also featured in the production.

== Orchestration and chorus ==
=== Original ===
The original score calls for a piano, 2 saxophones, 2 guitars, bass guitar, and drums, while the original backup chorus calls for 8 singers: 4 males and 4 females. This is the version licensed for performance by amateur groups. The piano and the first keyboard is usually played by the band's conductor. The two guitarists double on acoustic and electric.

=== 1994 revival ===
The 1994 revival is scored for 2 keyboards, 2 guitars, bass guitar, drums, percussion, 2 violins, viola, cello, 2 trumpets, trombone, and 2 saxophones. The 1994 revival chorus calls for 5 males and 5 females.

=== 2007 revival ===
The 2007 revival is scored for 2 keyboards, 2 violins, viola, cello, 2 trumpets, trombone, 2 saxophones, 2 guitars, bass guitar, and drums and percussion. The first keyboard is played by the conductor. The two guitarists double on acoustic and electric. One guitarist plays lead while the other plays rhythm. The first woodwind doubles on tenor and alto saxophone and flute while the second one doubles on tenor, alto and baritone saxophone, flute and soprano saxophone. The 12-piece backup chorus calls for 6 males and 6 females.

== Awards and honors ==
=== Original Broadway production ===
Year	Award Ceremony	Category	Nominee	Result
1972	Drama Desk Award	Outstanding Choreography	Patricia Birch	Won
1972	Drama Desk Award	Outstanding Costume Design	Carrie Robbins	Won
1972	Theatre World Award		Adrienne Barbeau	Won
1972	Tony Award	Best Musical		Nominated
1972	Tony Award	Best Book of a Musical	Jim Jacobs and Warren Casey	Nominated
1972	Tony Award	Best Performance by a Leading Actor in a Musical	Barry Bostwick	Nominated
1972	Tony Award	Best Performance by a Featured Actor in a Musical	Timothy Meyers	Nominated
1972	Tony Award	Best Performance by a Featured Actress in a Musical	Adrienne Barbeau	Nominated
1972	Tony Award	Best Choreography	Patricia Birch	Nominated
1972	Tony Award	Best Costume Design	Carrie Robbins	Nominated

=== 1993 West End revival ===
Year	Award Ceremony	Category	Nominee	Result
1993	Olivier Award	Best Musical Revival		Nominated
1993	Olivier Award	Best Theater Choreography	Arlene Philips	Nominated

=== 1994 Broadway revival ===
Year	Award Ceremony	Category	Nominee	Result
1994	Drama Desk Award	Outstanding Featured Actor in a Musical	Sam Harris	Nominated
1994	Drama Desk Award	Outstanding Choreography	Jeff Calhoun	Nominated
1994	Theatre World Award		Brooke Shields	Won
1994	Tony Award	Best Revival of a Musical		Nominated
1994	Tony Award	Best Performance by a Featured Actress in a Musical	Marcia Lewis	Nominated
1994	Tony Award	Best Choreography	Jeff Calhoun	Nominated

=== 2007 Broadway revival ===
Year	Award Ceremony	Category	Nominee	Result
2007	Tony Award	Best Revival of a Musical		Nominated

== See also ==
- Grease: You're the One That I Want!
- Grease: The School Musical

== Footnotes ==
Preceded by Fiddler on the Roof	Longest-running Broadway show 1979–1983	Succeeded by A Chorus Line
