= Jim Jacobs =

American dramatist

- Born: October 7, 1942 (age 83); Chicago, Illinois, U.S.
- Occupations: Composer; librettist; lyricist; guitarist; actor
- Notable work: Grease
- Partner(s): Diane Rita Gomez (1965-1974); Denise Nettleton (1978-); Karyn Kobayashi
- Children: 4

Jim Jacobs (born October 7, 1942) is an American actor, composer, lyricist, and writer for the theatre, long associated with the Chicago theater scene.

Jacobs is best known for creating the book, storyline, characters, and lyrics for the 1971 musical Grease with Warren Casey. Grease was adapted into the film Grease in 1978, which would become one of the most successful film adaptations of a musical in history in terms of gross revenue adjusted for inflation.

== Biography ==
=== Career ===
Jacobs was born on October 7, 1942, in Chicago, Illinois, to Harold, a factory foreman, and Norma (Mathison) Jacobs. Jacobs attended Taft High School, during which time he played guitar and sang with a band called DDT & the Dynamiters. When he was 11, his idol was Bill Haley, but when he was fourteen it was Elvis Presley. He also cites Buddy Holly, Little Richard, and Jerry Lee Lewis as influences, while noting he despised later rock bands such as The Grateful Dead and Led Zeppelin.

When he was a teenager, he would imitate playing a guitar with a broomstick. He eventually convinced his parents to pay for guitar lessons. After four lessons, he quit and decided to buy a guitar book and teach himself. From this, he found a simple chord structure: C, A minor, F, G7—this would later be used in "Those Magic Changes" featured in Grease. While continuing to learn guitar he also was in a band, with guitarist Terry Kath in his late teenage years. As a teenager, he found himself surrounded by Polish-American and Italian-American gangs, though Tom Meyer, the inspiration for Danny Zuko, noted that Jacobs was not involved in most of the illegal activity that those gangs committed. When he was 19, his parents convinced him that he shouldn't go to college, and instead ended up working at a factory packing ink. After a year working at the factory, he decided to quit.

In 1963, he became involved with a local theatre group that included Warren Casey, The Chicago Playwrights Center (at that time it was called Hull House Playwrights Center) run by artistic director Robert Sickinger.

For the next five years he appeared in more than fifty theatrical productions in the Chicago area, working with such people as The Second City founder Paul Sills, while earning a living as an advertising copywriter. He also landed a small role in the 1969 film Medium Cool.

Jacobs' Broadway acting debut was in a 1970 revival of the play No Place to be Somebody, followed by the national tour.

=== Grease ===
In the second half of the 1960s, Jacobs found himself at a party surrounded by stoners, disgusted by the state of rock music at the time and longing for the sounds of 1950s rock and roll, and was inspired to write a production based upon life in the early rock and roll era. He began working with Warren Casey on the musical; entitled Grease, it was based largely on Jacobs's high school experiences and even used the names of some of Jacobs's acquaintances, with Jacobs inserting himself into the musical as two of the characters, the innocent Doody and the more confident Roger. In its original form, it premiered in 1971 at the Kingston Mines Theater in the Old Town section of Chicago. Compared to the version that later became famous, many of the songs were more Chicago-centred, and there was extensive use of profanity. Jacobs remembered: "When we went to New York... we were told it was necessary to make the characters lovable, instead of scaring everybody. The show went from about three-quarters book and one-quarter music to one-quarter book and three-quarters music."

Producers Ken Waissman and Maxine Fox saw the show and suggested to the playwrights that it might work better as a musical, and told them if the creative partners were willing to rework it and they liked the result, they would produce it off-Broadway. The team headed to New York City to collaborate on what would become Grease, which opened at the Eden Theatre in lower Manhattan. The Best Plays of 1971-72 notes that "Though Grease opened geographically off Broadway, it did so under first class Broadway contracts." The show was deemed eligible for the 1972 Tony Awards, receiving seven Tony Award nominations. In June 1972 the production moved to the Broadhurst Theatre in the heart of Manhattan's Broadway Theater District. Six months later it moved to the Royale Theatre where it played until January 1980. For five final weeks, the run of the show moved to the much larger Majestic Theatre (Broadway). Casey earned a Tony Award nomination for Best Book of a Musical. The show went on to become a West End hit and a hugely successful film.

=== Later career ===
Grease would be the only musical from Jacobs and Casey to make it to Broadway or achieve widespread success. The two would collaborate on one other show, Island of Lost Coeds: a spoof on 1940s and 1950s B movies: a captain and crew crash on a deserted island inhabited by beautiful women with ratted hair, tiger-skin swimsuits and rubber spears. In 1980, he appeared in the film Love in a Taxi, directed by Robert Sickinger.

Jacobs served as a judge on the NBC reality series Grease: You're the One that I Want! in 2006, designed to cast the lead roles in an August 2007 Broadway revival of Grease via viewer votes. Jacobs stated that he agreed to take part in the show only after NBC offered him too much money for him to refuse.

As of May 2022, Jacobs resides in Los Angeles.

=== Awards ===
- 1969 – Joseph Jefferson Award nomination for best actor in Jimmy Shine
- 1972 – Tony Award nomination for best book of a musical Grease
- 1972 – Grammy Award nomination for best score from an original cast show album Grease
- 1973 – Cue Magazine Award
- 1979 – ASCAP award for longest-running show in Broadway history
- 2011 – Joseph Jefferson Award for Best Production – Musical – Midsize for The Original Grease
