= Randy Stumpf =

American film, stage and television actor

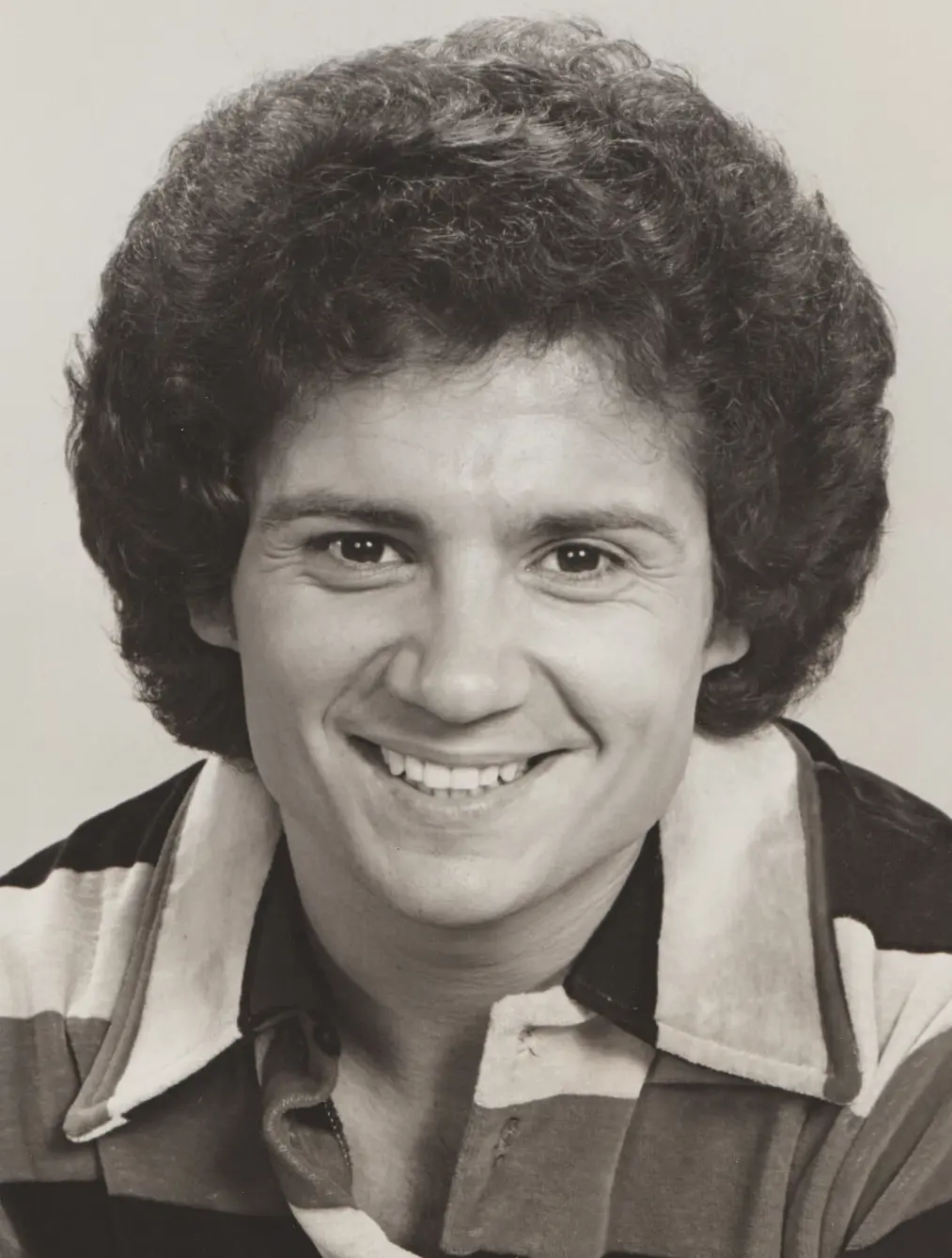
- Stumpf in 1978
- Born: Randall Stumpf; September 9, 1956 (age 70); Belleville, Illinois, U.S.
- Occupations: Film, stage and television actor

Randall Stumpf (born September 9, 1956) is an American film, stage and television actor. He is best known for playing Ron Garvey in the American soap opera television series Days of Our Lives.

== Life and career ==
Stumpf was born in Belleville, Illinois, the son of Barbara Stumpf. He attended and graduated from Gibault High School. After graduating, he served in the United States Army at Fort Campbell in Kentucky for two years, which after he enlisted in the Army, he denied a theatrical scholarship from the Western Illinois University. During his military service, he appeared in numerous stage plays, and was a choreographer. He began his screen career in 1977, playing Ron Garvey in the NBC soap opera television series Days of Our Lives. In 1978, he appeared in the television film Are You in the House Alone?.

Later in his career, in 1979, Stumpf starred as Joey Dee in the CBS sitcom television series Flatbush, starring along with Joseph Cali, Adrian Zmed, Vincent Bufano and Sandy Helberg. He guest-starred in television programs including Police Woman, Too Close for Comfort, M*A*S*H, CHiPs, Happy Days and The Jeffersons. In 1980, he appeared in the film Those Lips, Those Eyes.

Stumpf retired from acting in 1984, last appearing in the film Silent Night, Deadly Night.
