= Grease 2 (soundtrack) =

Soundtrack album to the film Grease 2
- Released: June 11, 1982
- Recorded: 1981
- Studios: Evergreen Recording Studios, Burbank, California
- Genre: Rock and roll
- Length: 32:28
- Labels: RSO (Original issue); Polydor (Re-issue)
- Producer: Louis St. Louis

Professional ratings
Review scores
Source	Rating
Allmusic	link

Grease 2: Original Soundtrack Recording is the original motion picture soundtrack for the 1982 film Grease 2 starring Maxwell Caulfield and Michelle Pfeiffer. It was originally released by RSO Records in 1982, with Polydor Records re-issuing it in 1996.

Like the film, the soundtrack failed to match the commercial success of its predecessor. The album peaked at #71 on the Billboard album chart. The lead single, "Back to School Again" by the Four Tops, peaked at #71 on the Billboard Hot 100 in the U.S. and at #62 on the UK Singles Chart.

== Reception ==
Billboard magazine listed the album among its "Top Album Picks", meaning that the album was predicted to reach the top half of the album chart. Comparing the soundtrack to that of the first film, the Billboard reviewer wrote, "The soundtrack is a similar mix of peppy party tunes ('Who's That Guy' recalls 'Summer Nights') and pretty ballads ('We'll Be Together' has some of the AC appeal of 'Hopelessly Devoted to You')." However, the reviewer also commented, "Don't hold your breath waiting for 'Grease 3.'"

== Track listing ==
Side A
No.	Title	Writer(s)	Performer	Length
1.	"Back to School Again"	Louis St. Louis, Howard Greenfield	The Four Tops	3:29
2.	"Cool Rider"	Dennis Linde	Michelle Pfeiffer	3:31
3.	"Score Tonight"	St. Louis, Dominic Bugatti, Frank Musker	The T-Birds, The Pink Ladies	2:54
4.	"Girl for All Seasons"	Bugatti, Musker	Maureen Teefy, Lorna Luft, Alison Price, Pfeiffer	3:30
5.	"Do It for Our Country"	Rob Hegel	Peter Frechette	2:39
6.	"Who's That Guy?"	St. Louis, Greenfield	The Cast	5:09

Side B
No.	Title	Writer(s)	Performer	Length
1.	"Prowlin'"	Bugatti, Musker, Christopher Famous	The T-Birds	3:04
2.	"Reproduction"	Linde	Tab Hunter, The Cast	4:07
3.	"Charades"	St. Louis, Michael Gibson	Maxwell Caulfield	4:02
4.	"(Love Will) Turn Back the Hands of Time"	St. Louis, Greenfield	Caufield, Pfeiffer	3:38
5.	"Rock-a-Hula-Luau (Summer Is Coming)"	Bugatti, Musker	The Cast	3:25
6.	"We'll Be Together"	Bob Morrison, Johnny MacRae	Caulfield, Pfeiffer, Adrian Zmed, Luft, Peter Frechette, Maureen Teefy, The Cast	3:39

== Charts ==
Chart (1982)	Peak position
Australia (Kent Music Report)	44
United States (Billboard 200)	71

== Personnel ==
- Tim May: Guitars
- Andy Muson: Bass
- Denny Seiwell: Drums
- Louis St. Louis: Keyboards
- Michael Gibson: Orchestrations

== Certifications ==
Region	Certification	Certified units/sales
Hong Kong (IFPI Hong Kong)	Platinum	20,000^{*}
United Kingdom (BPI)	Silver	60,000^{^}
^{*} Sales figures based on certification alone.^{^} Shipments figures based on certification alone.
