= Cool Rider =

2014 musical

- Music: Various
- Lyrics: Various
- Basis: Grease 2 by Ken Finkleman; Patricia Birch; Grease by Jim Jacobs; Warren Casey
- Productions: 2014 West End

Cool Rider (originally titled Cool Rider Live) is a 2014 musical that was first presented as a single performance on 27 January 2014, at the Lyric Theatre, London. It was staged again for one week only, 15 April – 19 April 2014, at the Duchess Theatre, in London. The musical was adapted from the 1982 film Grease 2.

== Synopsis ==
Stephanie Zinone, leader of the Pink Ladies, has a romantic fling with English transfer student Michael Carrington. The only way she'll stay with him, however, is by him becoming a T-Bird.

== Cast and characters ==
Five actors appeared in all performances as their character.

Lyric Theatre, London, 27 January 2014

The T-Birds

- Aaron Sidwell as Michael Carrington
- Niall Sheehy as Johnny Nogerelli
- Joshua Dowen as Louis DiMucci
- Kane Oliver Parry as Goose McKenzie
- Ben Stott as Davey Jaworski

The Pink Ladies

- Ashleigh Gray as Stephanie Zinone
- Hannah Levane as Paulette Rebchuck
- Bronté Barbé as Sharon Cooper
- Evelyn Hoskins as Rhonda Ritter
- Dolores Rebchuck character does not appear

also

- Reece Shearsmith as Mr Stewart
- Nadine Cox as Ms Mason

Duchess Theatre, 15–19 April 2014

The T-Birds

- Aaron Sidwell as Michael Carrington
- Stewart Clarke as Johnny Nogerelli
- Joshua Dowen as Louis DiMucci
- Luke Fetherston as Goose McKenzie
- Harry Francis as Davey Jaworski

The Pink Ladies

- Ashleigh Gray as Stephanie Zinone
- Hannah Levane as Paulette Rebchuck
- Bronté Barbé as Sharon Cooper
- Lucinda Lawrence as Rhonda Ritter
- Dolores Rebchuck character does not appear

also

- Mark Benton as Mr Stewart
- Niki Evans as Ms Mason

=== Notable cast members ===
Role		Grease 2 (1982)	Lyric (Jan. 2014)	Duchess (Apr. 2014)
T-Birds	Michael Carrington	Maxwell Caulfield	Aaron Sidwell	Aaron Sidwell
T-Birds	Johnny Nogerelli	Adrian Zmed	Niall Sheehy	Stewart Clarke
T-Birds	Louis DiMucci	Peter Frechette	Joshua Dowen	Joshua Dowen
T-Birds	Goose McKenzie	Christopher McDonald	Kane Oliver Parry	Luke Fetherston
T-Birds	Davey Jaworski	Leif Green	Ben Stott	Harry Francis
Pink Ladies	Stephanie Zinone	Michelle Pfeiffer	Ashleigh Gray	Ashleigh Gray
Pink Ladies	Paulette Rebchuck	Lorna Luft	Hannah Levane	Hannah Levane
Pink Ladies	Sharon Cooper	Maureen Teefy	Bronté Barbé	Bronté Barbé
Pink Ladies	Rhonda Ritter	Alison Price	Evelyn Hoskins	Lucinda Lawrence
Pink Ladies	Dolores Rebchuck	Pamela Segall	—	—
	Mr Stewart	Tab Hunter	Reece Shearsmith	Mark Benton
	Ms Mason	Connie Stevens	Nadine Cox	Niki Evans

Character relationships
T-Birds	×	Pink Ladies
Michael Carrington	×	Stephanie Zinone
Johnny Nogerelli	×	Paulette Rebchuck
Louis DiMucci	×	Sharon Cooper
Goose McKenzie	×	Rhonda Ritter
Davey Jaworski	×	Dolores Rebchuck

== Musical numbers ==
Original Studio Cast Recording

(Released 29 June 2015)

1. "Overture" – Cool Rider Band
2. "Back to School" – Cast
3. "Who's That Girl?" – Aaron Sidwell
4. "Score Tonight" – Niall Sheehy & Cast
5. "Mr Sandman" – Felipe Bejarano, Jack Feureisen, Rhys Owen, Rick Woska
6. "Cool Rider" – Ashleigh Gray
7. "Who's That Guy?" – Cast
8. "Reproduction" – Reece Shearsmith & Company
9. "Do It for Our Country" – Joshua Dowen, Bronté Barbé
10. "Charades" – Aaron Sidwell
11. "Prowlin'" – Niall Sheehy, Joshua Dowen, Mark Anderson, Daniel Buckley
12. "Brad" – Jennifer Harding, Laura Hyde
13. "Girl for All Seasons" – Ashleigh Gray, Hannah Levane, Bronté Barbé, Lucinda Lawrence
14. "(Love Will) Turn Back the Hands of Time" – Ashleigh Gray, Aaron Sidwell
15. "Rock-a-Hula-Luau (Summer Is Coming)" – Niki Evans & Cast
16. "We'll Be Together" – Cast
