= Maxwell Caulfield =

British actor (born 1959)

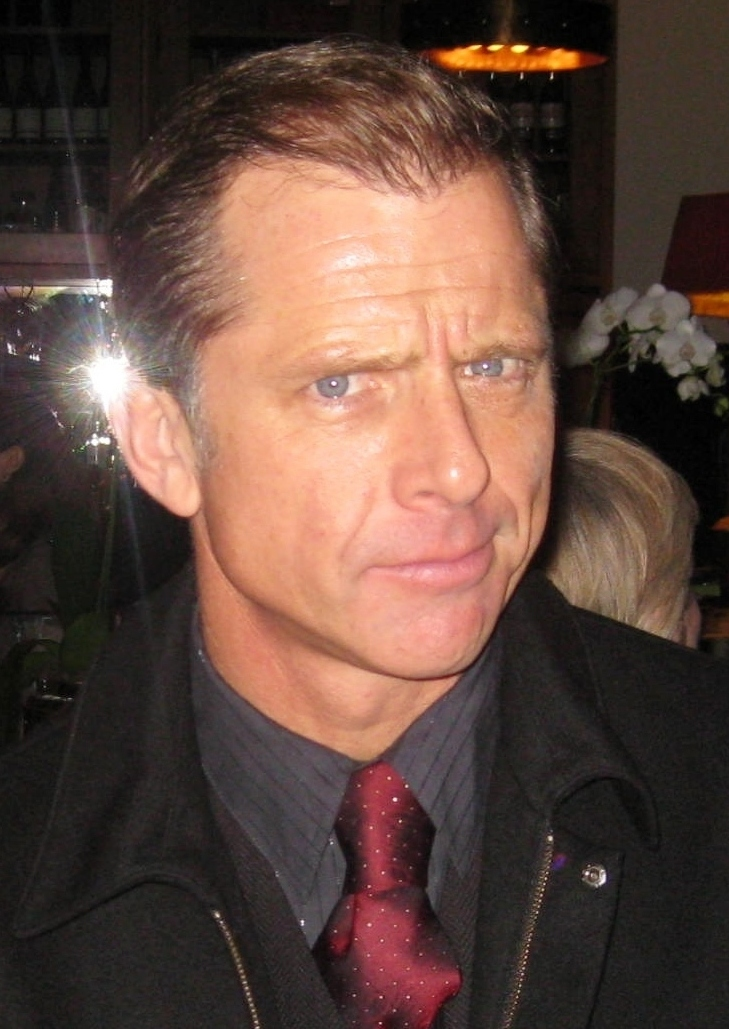
- Caulfield in 2010
- Born: Maxwell P.J. Newby; 23 November 1959 (age 66); Belper, Derbyshire, England
- Other name: Maxwell Findlater
- Occupation: Actor
- Years active: 1967–present
- Spouse: Juliet Mills (m. 1980)
- Relatives: Mary Hayley Bell (Mother-in-Law); Sir John Mills (Father-In-Law); Hayley Mills (Sister-in-Law); Crispian Mills (Nephew)

Maxwell Caulfield (born Maxwell P.J. Newby; 23 November 1959) is a British and American actor. He has appeared in Grease 2 (1982), Electric Dreams (1984), The Boys Next Door (1985), The Supernaturals (1986), Sundown: The Vampire in Retreat (1989), Waxwork 2 (1992), Gettysburg (1993), Empire Records (1995), The Real Blonde (1997), The Man Who Knew Too Little (1997), and in A Prince for Christmas (2015). In 2015, Caulfield toured Australia with his wife Juliet Mills and sister-in-law Hayley Mills in the comedy Legends! by Pulitzer Prize winner James Kirkwood. He voiced James Bond in the video game James Bond 007: Nightfire (2002). He most recently stars in the Netflix movie The Merry Gentlemen (2024).

He is best remembered internationally for his starring role as Miles Colby during the 1980s on the American TV series Dynasty and its spinoff The Colbys.

== Early life and family ==
Maxwell P.J. Newby was born on 23 November 1959 in Belper, Derbyshire, (Note: Although some sources reports he was born in Scotland, Caulfield has verified it is erroneous, although his maternal grandfather was Scottish.) the elder son of Peter Newby and Oriole Rosalind Findlater. His younger brother, Marcus, is also an actor. By 1965, his parents had divorced, and his mother legally abandoned the surname Newby in favour of her maiden name.

== Career ==
=== Theatre ===
His stage debut in London was dancing in a "nude show" to music by Led Zeppelin and Pink Floyd. Being an exotic dancer at London's Windmill Theatre led to him obtaining an Equity card, enabling him to work as an actor. After obtaining a green card, relocated from the UK to the US at age 18, making his New York City debut in a gay farce, Hot Rock Hotel (1978). The following year, in Class Enemy (1979) (which eventually went Off-Broadway), he played the lead role and won a Theatre World Award for his performance. He made his Los Angeles debut in Hitting Town (1980) and appeared in The Elephant Man (1980) that same year, during which he met his future wife, actress Juliet Mills.

In the early 1980s, Caulfield was an active member of the Mirror Repertory Company, part of The Mirror Theater Ltd, performing in numerous repertory productions including Paradise Lost, Rain, Inheritors and The Hasty Heart. He made his debut Off-Broadway in 1981 as the title character, a homicidal drifter, in Joe Orton's Entertaining Mr. Sloane (alongside Joseph Maher and Barbara Bryne). His performance was widely praised; one critic wrote:

Maxwell Caulfield is the ideal spider in the web...as disarming of himself as he is of others — which gives this revival that tragic tinge of great comedy.

Caulfield made his Broadway debut in J. B. Priestley's An Inspector Calls opposite Siân Phillips. He performed opposite Stacy Keach in Sleuth in Los Angeles in 1988. He appeared with Jessica Tandy and Elizabeth Wilson in Salonika at the Public Theater in New York, appearing fully nude for much of the play, and in Joe Orton's black comedy Loot at the Mark Taper Forum in Los Angeles. In 2006, Caulfield drew attention over his bare-chested scene in the Off-Broadway two-hander Tryst, opposite Amelia Campbell. In 2007, he performed in the Charles Busch play Our Leading Lady with Kate Mulgrew.

In 2007, Caulfield made his West End debut as Billy Flynn in the long-running London production of Chicago; he then resumed the role of Flynn for the Broadway production in November 2007. In 2011, he appeared in an Off-Broadway production of the comedy Cactus Flower.

On 14 April 2024, Caulfield appeared in the 10th Anniversary Concert of Cool Rider (the Greasiest Sequel) at the London Palladium, playing the role Mr. Stuart and performing the song "Reproduction".

=== Television ===
Caulfield has appeared on Dynasty (1985–1986), The Colbys (1985–1987), Murder, She Wrote (1988–1991), Beverly Hills, 90210 (1990), The Rockford Files: Godfather Knows Best (1996), Spider-Man (1995–1998), Casualty (2003–2004), Emmerdale (2009–2010) and NCIS (2013). He guest-starred on Modern Family (Season 4, Episode 16, "Bad Hair Day") playing Claire's ex-boyfriend and college professor.

On May 29, 2026, Caulfield appeared as Apollo, a New York City art gallery owner, on General Hospital.

=== Feature films ===
Caulfield is especially known for his role in Grease 2 (1982). Some of his other films include The Real Blonde with Matthew Modine and Daryl Hannah (1997; opened the Sundance Film Festival) Gettysburg (1993), and The Man Who Knew Too Little (1997). Another memorable role is in Empire Records (1995).

Although he did not work regularly as a child actor, at the age of seven he played Ted in the 1967 film Accident and was billed as Maxwell Findlater.

== Personal life ==
Caulfield has been married since 1980 to actress Juliet Mills, daughter of actor Sir John Mills and writer Lady Mills (née Mary Hayley Bell), and is a brother-in-law of Jonathan Mills and actress Hayley Mills.

He became a naturalized United States citizen on 5 September 1991.

== Stage credits ==
Year	Title	Role	Theatre
1978	Hot Rock Hotel	Demetrius	Truck and Warehouse Theatre, New York City
1979	Class Enemy	Iron (Herron)	Off-Broadway: Players' Theatre, West Village, New York City
1980	The Elephant Man	John Merrick	Florida tour
1980	Hitting Town	Ralph	Zephyr Theatre, Los Angeles
1980	Crimes and Dreams	Frazer	Off-Broadway: Theater Four, New York City
1981–1982	Entertaining Mr Sloane	Sloane	Off-Broadway: Cherry Lane Theatre, New York City
1982	Journey's End	Captain Stanhope	Cast Theatre, Los Angeles
1983	1984	Winston Smith	Cast Theatre, Los Angeles
1983	Paradise Lost	Ben Gordon	Theatre at St. Peter's Church, New York City
1983	Inheritors	Horace	Theatre at St. Peter's Church, New York City
1985	Salonika	Peter	Off-Broadway: The Public Theater, New York City
1987	Loot	Dennis	Mark Taper Forum, Los Angeles
1987	Entertaining Mr Sloane	Sloane	Mark Taper Forum, Los Angeles
1988	Sleuth	Milo Tindle	US National Tour
1991	Never the Sinner	Richard Loeb	Citadel Theatre, Edmonton (Canada)
1995	An Inspector Calls	Gerald Croft	Broadway: Royale Theatre, New York City
1995	Sweet Bird of Youth	Chance Wayne	Williamstown Theatre Festival, Williamstown, Massachusetts
1997	My Night with Reg	John	Off-Broadway: INTAR Theatre, New York City
1998	Dial M for Murder		Cape Cod Playhouse, Dennis, Massachusetts
2002	He Hunts	Duchotel	Geffen Playhouse, Los Angeles
2006	Tryst	George Love	Off-Broadway: Promenade Theatre, New York City
2006	My Deah	Gator Hedgepeth	Off-Broadway: June Havoc Theatre, New York City
2007	Our Leading Lady	Harry Hawk	Off-Broadway: New York City Center - Stage II, New York City
2007	La Cage aux Folles	Georges	Ogunquit Playhouse, Ogunquit, Maine
2007	Chicago	Billy Flynn	West End: Cambridge Theatre, London
2007	Chicago	Billy Flynn	Broadway: Ambassador Theatre, New York City
2008	A Little Night Music	Count Carl-Magnus Malcolm	Center Stage, Baltimore
2010	Bedroom Farce	Nick	UK national tour
2010	The Rocky Horror Show	The Narrator	UK national tour
2011	Cactus Flower	Dr. Julian Winston	Off-Broadway: Westside Theatre, New York City
2013–2014	Singin' in the Rain	R.F. Simpson	UK national tour
2015	The Odd Couple	Felix Ungar	Laguna Playhouse, Laguna Beach, California
2015	Legends!	Klemmer	Australian tour
2015	My Fair Lady	Henry Higgins	Atwood Concert Hall, Anchorage, Alaska
2016	Guys and Dolls	Nathan Detroit	UK national tour
2018	Hangmen	Albert	Off-Broadway: Linda Gross Theater, New York City
2019	The Lady Vanishes	Dr. Hartz	UK national tour
2024	Cool Rider	Mr Stuart	London Palladium

== Filmography ==
=== Film ===
Year	Title	Role	Notes
1967	Accident	Ted	Credited as Maxwell Findlater
1982	Grease 2	Michael Carrington	
1984	Electric Dreams	Bill	
1985	The Boys Next Door	Roy Tomas Alston	
1986	The Supernaturals	Pvt. Ray Ellis	
1989	Sundown: The Vampire in Retreat	Shane	
1989	Mind Games	Eric Garrison	
1990	Fatal Sky	George Abbott	
1992	Exiled in America	Joe Moore	
1992	Animal Instincts	David Cole	
1992	Dance with Death	Shaughnessy	
1992	Waxwork 2	Mickey	
1993	No Escape No Return	William Robert Sloan	
1993	Gettysburg	Col. Strong Vincent	
1993	Calendar Girl	Man in Bathrobe	
1993	Midnight Witness	Garland	
1993	Alien Intruder	Nick Mancuzo	
1995	Empire Records	Rex Manning	
1996	Prey of the Jaguar	Derek Leigh / The Jaguar	
1996	Oblivion 2: Backlash	Sweeney	
1997	Divine Lovers	Jeff Thompson	
1997	The Man Who Knew Too Little	British Agent	
1997	The Real Blonde	Bob	
1999	More to Love	Barry Gordon	
1999	Smut		Unfinished
1999	Dazzle	Tom	
2000	Submerged	Jim Carpenter	
2000	The Perfect Tenant	Daniel Summer	
2000	Overnight Sensation	Mark Connor	
2001	The Hit	Keith	
2001	Facing the Enemy	Harlan Moss	
2004	Dragon Storm	Silas	
2006	Dog Lover's Symphony	Tom	
2007	Nightmare City 2035	Alex McDowell	
2007	Cry of the Winged Serpent	Griffin	
2009	Dire Wolf	Sheriff Parker	
2013	The Right Regrets	Chris Wickham	Short film
2015	Those Who Wander	Rex	
2016	The Tormentors	Rob Turner	
2020	Axcellerator	Ray Moritz	
2022	Butlers in Love	Mr. Willoughby	
2022	Love Accidentally	Craig	
2023	7000 Miles	Bert	
2023	Craft Me a Romance	Alfred	
2024	The Merry Gentlemen	Danny	

=== Television ===
Year	Title	Role	Notes
1980	Ryan's Hope	Punk	4 episodes
1983	Journey's End	Captain Stanhope	TV movie
1983	The Powers of Matthew Star	Scotty Ferguson	Episode: "Starr Knight"
1984	The Parade	Jeff	TV movie
1985–1986	Dynasty	Miles Colby	9 episodes
1985–1987	The Colbys	Miles Colby	49 episodes
1987	Hotel	Alex Morrison	Episode: "Pitfalls"
1988–1991	Murder, She Wrote	Derek Padley/Roger Travis	2 episodes
1989	Judith Krantz's Till We Meet Again	Alain Marais	TV miniseries
1990	Counterstrike	Van Gelder	Episode: "Regal Connection"
1990	Monsters	Timothy Danforth	Episode: "Cellmates"
1990	Beverly Hills, 90210	Jason Croft	Episode: "Class of Beverly Hills"
1990	Blue Bayou	Phil Serulla	TV movie
1991	Dynasty: The Reunion	Miles Colby	Miniseries
1994	Sirens	Maxwell Caulfield	Episode: "Crossing the Line"
1994	Dr. Quinn, Medicine Woman	Andrew Strauss / David Lewis	2 episodes
1995–1998	Spider-Man: The Animated Series	Alistair Smythe / Ultimate Spider Slayer (voice)	19 episodes
1996	The Rockford Files: Godfather Knows Best	Ian Levin	TV movie
1996	The Lazarus Man	General Custer	Episode: "The Boy General"
1996–1997	All My Children	Pierce Riley	
1998	Love Boat: The Next Wave	Armand	Episode: "True Course"
1998	Mike Hammer, Private Eye	Tony Berelli	Episode: "The Maya Connection"
1998	Veronica's Closet	Brian	Episode: "Veronica's Bridal Shower"
1999	The Nanny	Rodney Pembroke	Episode: "The Fran in the Mirror"
2000	Son of the Beach	Stevens	Episode: "A Star is Boned"
2000	La Femme Nikita	Helmut Volker	2 episodes
2000	Missing Pieces	Stuart	TV movie
2000–2001	Strip Mall	Rafe Barrett	22 episodes
2003–2004	Casualty	Jim Brodie	58 episodes
2004	Holby City	Jim Brodie	Episode: "Casualty @ Holby City: Part 2"
2006	The Great San Francisco Earthquake	Mayor Schmitz	TV movie
2009–10	Emmerdale	Mark Wylde	169 episodes
2013	NCIS	Dr. Madison Fielding	Episode: "Revenge"
2013	Modern Family	Professor Cooke	Episode: "Bad Hair Day"
2013	DeVanity	Richard DeVanity	2 episodes
2015	A Prince for Christmas	King of Balemont	TV movie
2015	I'm Not Ready for Christmas	Greydon DuPois	TV movie
2015	Castle	Sir Ian Rasher	Episode: "The Wrong Stuff"
2021	Lost & Found in Rome	Howard Thorndyke	TV movie
2021	American Horror Story: Double Feature	Dwight's Friend #1	Episode: "Take Me to Your Leader"
2022	Pam & Tommy	Bob Guccione	Episode 5: "Uncle Jim and Aunt Susie In Duluth"
2023	The Bay	Sir Thomas Kenway	7 episodes
2024	Landman	Governor of Texas	Episode: "Clumsy, This Life"
2026	General Hospital	Apollo	1 episode

== Audiobook narrations ==
- Anonymous Rex by Eric Garcia (2000)
- The Lion of Cormarre and Other Stories: The Collected Stories of Arthur C. Clarke (1937–1949) (2001)
- Mimus by Lilli Thal (2007)
- Spud by John van de Ruit (2008)
- Sebastian Darke: Prince of Fools by Philip Caveney (2008)
- Spud: The Madness Continues by John van de Ruit (2009)
- The War of the Worlds by H. G. Wells (2012)

== Video games ==
- James Bond 007: Nightfire (2002) as James Bond
- Eragon (2006) as Brom

== Discography ==
- 1982: "Charades" on the Grease 2 soundtrack (as Michael Carrington)
- 1982: "(Love Will) Turn Back the Hands of Time" with Michelle Pfeiffer on the Grease 2 soundtrack
- 1982: "Who's That Guy?" with Cast on the Grease 2 soundtrack
- 1982: "Reproduction" with Cast on the Grease 2 soundtrack
- 1982: "Rock-A-Hula-Luau (Summer Is Coming)" with Cast on the Grease 2 soundtrack
- 1982: "We'll Be Together" with Cast on the Grease 2 soundtrack
- 1995: "Say No More (Mon Amore)" in Alan Moyle's Empire Records (as Rex Manning)

== Awards and nominations ==
- Theater World Award (1979) for his performance in Class Enemy (Players' Theatre, West Village, New York City).
