= The Boys Next Door (1985 film) =

1985 American film directed by Penelope Spheeris

- Film poster
- Directed by: Penelope Spheeris
- Written by: Glen Morgan; James Wong
- Produced by: Sandy Howard; Keith Rubinstein
- Starring: Maxwell Caulfield; Charlie Sheen
- Cinematography: Arthur Albert
- Edited by: Andy Horvitch
- Music by: George S. Clinton
- Production company: Republic Entertainment International
- Distributed by: New World Pictures
- Release dates: October 1985 (Chicago); November 1, 1985 (U.S.)
- Running time: 91 minutes
- Country: United States
- Language: English
- Budget: $2.5 million

The Boys Next Door (released as No Apparent Motive in Australia) is a 1985 American neo-noir crime drama film directed by Penelope Spheeris, from a screenplay by Glen Morgan and James Wong. It stars Maxwell Caulfield and Charlie Sheen as two sociopathic teenagers who leave their small town home on the day of their high school graduation and embark on a crime and murder spree.

The film was Spheeris' second narrative feature following Suburbia (1984), and was released by New World Pictures on November 1, 1985.

== Plot ==
Roy Alston and Bo Richards are two outcasts of their high school community. Bo receives $200 as a graduation gift from his grandparents. Facing a lifetime of working blue collar factory jobs in their dead-end hometown, the boys spontaneously decide to use the money to go on a vacation to Los Angeles.

During the drive to L.A., Bo and Roy rob a gas station and beat the attendant with a tire iron. The next day, the boys go to the Venice Beach Boardwalk, where Roy throws an empty beer bottle and it hits an elderly woman on the forehead. Three young women see this, and they chase Bo and Roy to a parking lot. The women yell at the boys and damage their car. Enraged, Roy starts the car and drives around in circles in the parking lot with the women still on the hood. After several loops, Roy throws the car into reverse, throwing one of the women from the hood of the car. After the incident, one of the women finds Bo and Roy's dog, Boner the Barbarian, and reads its ID tag, which leads to speculation of where Bo and Roy are from.

During a visit to La Brea Tar Pits, Bo expresses his wish that the world could just "go caveman" for one day, abandoning all rules and order. Roy agrees, and they spend their evening on the streets of Los Angeles.

Several additional encounters lead to more deaths, including a gay man they meet at a bar, Chris, a young couple, and an older woman Angie Baker whom Roy kills while she is having sex with Bo.

Eventually the duo are tracked and found by the LAPD and chased into a shopping mall. After unsuccessfully trying to steal some guns, Bo tries to talk some sense into Roy about surrendering. Roy refuses, and he orders Bo to give him the gun so he can go out in a "blaze of glory". Bo refuses and shoots Roy when he tries to take the gun away. The police surround Bo and ask him why he killed his friend. Bo replies, "Because I had to." Bo is then arrested and led away while reporters snap photos of him.

== Cast ==
- Maxwell Caulfield as Roy Alston
- Charlie Sheen as Bo Richards
- Patti D'Arbanville as Angie Baker
- Christopher McDonald as Detective Mark Woods
- Hank Garrett as Detective Ed Hanley
- Paul C. Dancer as Chris
- Richard Pachorek and Lesa Lee as The Couple
- Kenneth Cortland as Dwayne
- Moon Unit Zappa as Nancy
- Dawn Schneider as Bonnie Roberts
- Kurt Christian as Shakir
- Don Draper as Mr. Heaton
- Blackie Dammett as Bartender
- Phil Rubenstein as Gutfield
- James Carrington as Ross
- Grant Heslov as Joe Gonzales
- Michael Lewis as Kanter
- Vance Colvig as Old Man
- Carlos Guitarlos as Patient
- Carmen Filpi as Bum
- John Davey as Watkins

== Production ==
=== Casting ===
Penelope Spheeris' first choice to play the lead role of Roy Alston was Nicolas Cage, but the actor turned the project down.

Maxwell Caulfield nearly turned the film down due to its violent content, but was convinced to take the part by his wife Juliet Mills. At the time, he was frustrated over the lack of work following his starring part in Grease 2, and channeled many of his frustrations into his performance. He said in a 2001 interview:

I couldn't get arrested for a year and a half, then Penelope Spheeris went totally with a gut instinct on that and I am forever indebted to her for that. Unfortunately, it never really got released because New World Pictures were going under just as we finished. Working with Charlie Sheen was one of the reasons I held up my end of the picture. He is a spunky little character, man, and it was fun riding around with him. And Patti D'Arbanville was a doll.

Before Charlie Sheen was cast, Crispin Glover auditioned for the part of Bo and did a screen test with Caulfield. According to the audio commentary for the film, Spheeris said Glover's performance was "too psychotic".

=== Filming ===
Principal photography began on August 13, 1984 on a $5 million budget on location in Los Angeles. Shooting took place at Reseda Charter High School, the Venice Beach Boardwalk, Westwood, the La Brea Tar Pits, the Hollywood Hills, and Santa Monica Boulevard.

=== Editing ===
According to director Penelope Spheeris' DVD commentary, The Boys Next Door had to be cut and submitted to the MPAA ten times to get an R rating. Scenes that were cut or changed include:

- The scene where a gas attendant is beaten was shortened to lessen the intensity and sound effects were toned down.
- A scene depicting the murder of Chris was cut down (mostly sound effects were heavily toned down).
- A scene in which Roy shakes and kills Angie Baker (by breaking her neck) was heavily cut down, with various shots removed to lessen the intensity.

== Soundtrack ==
The film score was composed by George S. Clinton, under the alias 'Geo'. The soundtrack features various punk, New Wave, and hard rock songs by acts like Great White, Iggy Pop, The Cramps, Chequered Past, and Tex & the Horseheads.

== Release ==
The premiere of The Boys Next Door took place at the Chicago International Film Festival, on October 1, 1985, with a limited theatrical release by New World Pictures on November 1, 1985. It was then released in New York on March 14, 1986.

=== Home media ===
The Boys Next Door was released on VHS in 1986 by New World Video. The DVD was released on May 15, 2001, by Anchor Bay Entertainment. The DVD includes commentary by director Spheeris and co-star Caulfield, a trailer and talent bios. The film was later released on Blu-ray in the United States by Severin Films in 2019, and the United Kingdom in 2023. Special features include audio Commentary with Spheeris and Caulfield, and interviews with Caulfield and Christopher McDonald.

== Reception ==
=== Critical response ===
Time Out London called The Boys Next Door superior to Spheeris' previous work Suburbia (1984) in that it didn't try to sympathize with the two lead characters while still letting in a "glimmer of understanding into the murderers' feelings."

Vincent Canby, comparing the film to Over the Edge (1979) for its negative picture of a California teenager and to Badlands (1973) for its "lean and unsentimental" atmosphere, described it as a "very well made, disorienting movie about inarticulated despair and utter hopelessness." He praised the performances of Caulfield, Sheen, and D'Arbanville in the film.

Anton Bitel for Little White Lies called the film "a messy, dispiriting portrait of two rebels without a cause who go off the rails as they come of age, leaving only suffering and death in their wake.
