= Lori Lieberman =

American singer-songwriter (born 1951)

- Born: November 15, 1951 (age 75); Los Angeles, California, United States
- Genres: Pop; soft rock; folk rock
- Occupation: Singer-songwriter
- Instruments: Piano; vocals; guitar
- Years active: 1972–1978, mid-1990s–present
- Labels: Capitol; Millennium; Pope; Drive On; V2
- Website: www.lorilieberman.com

Lori Lieberman (born November 15, 1951) is an American singer-songwriter who accompanies herself on guitar and piano. She co-wrote "Killing Me Softly" and recorded the first version of the song, which became a hit single for Roberta Flack in 1973, and again in 1996 with a new arrangement by the Fugees. Lieberman's writing partners and management team of Charles Fox and Norman Gimbel did not assign her credit for helping to write the song, so she did not receive millions of dollars' worth of royalties.

Lieberman released four studio albums through Capitol Records in the 1970s, in the style of soft rock and folk. After a retreat in 1978, she resumed her recording career in 1995.

== Biography ==
=== Early life ===
Lieberman was born in Los Angeles in 1951 to a Jewish family. Her father, Kenneth Lieberman, was a chemical engineer who invented popcorn ceiling treatment. The middle of three sisters, she spent her childhood and adolescence traveling between California and Switzerland, where she attended the International School of Geneva. She returned to the US and attended Pine Manor College in Massachusetts.

Lieberman began singing and composing at a young age, simultaneously acquiring a taste for French singers such as Sylvie Vartan as well as American rock and pop music. The latter passion was fed by an older sister who listened to albums by Joni Mitchell, Judy Collins, Leonard Cohen and Jefferson Airplane.

=== First recording career ===
Shortly after she returned to America to study in her late teens, Lieberman was signed to a five-year production, recording, and publishing deal struck between Capitol Records and songwriters Charles Fox and Norman Gimbel. Lieberman's contributions to the process were occasionally credited during this period of her career, most notably on "My Lover Do You Know", which appeared on her first album, Lori Lieberman (1972), and which was singled out for praise by Billboard magazine. Lieberman recalled later that her management team was "very, very controlling... I felt victimized for most of my early career."

In the gap between her first and second albums, a song from Lieberman's debut, "Killing Me Softly with His Song", was recorded by Roberta Flack, becoming a US No. 1 and international hit and rapidly overshadowing Lieberman's own, more understated original. In March 1973, Lieberman recorded two songs for the film The Harrad Experiment, introduced in May that year. The songs, "I Hope I'll Have Your Love" and "Go Gently", were written by Fox and Gimbel. Her second album, Becoming (August 1973), became her first to reach the Billboard Top 200.

Two more Lieberman albums, A Piece of Time (1974) and Straw Colored Girl (1975), appeared on Capitol Records. In the wake of her departure from Capitol, material from her first four albums was compiled on a European release, The Best of Lori Lieberman. In 1977, the song "Great American Melting Pot", written by Lynn Ahrens for the television show Schoolhouse Rock, had vocals provided by Lieberman. She sang a song in the 1980s television show Fame.

In 1976, Lieberman freed herself from the onerous management of Gimbel and Fox, and left Capitol Records. She returned with Letting Go (Millennium Records, 1978, distributed by Casablanca Records/RCA Records), recorded in New York with producer Paul Leka. Lieberman's compositions were fully credited on the album. The song "Jingle" spoke to Lieberman's growing dissatisfaction with the music industry. Soon after the release of Letting Go, Lieberman abandoned her career.

=== Hiatus and second career ===
By the early 1990s, Lieberman was a mother of three who had settled in California and built a life out of the spotlight. When a neighbor, Joseph Cali (who had played Joey in Saturday Night Fever and was to become Lieberman's third husband) prompted her to return to music, she was initially reluctant but put aside these misgivings and recorded the album A Thousand Dreams which was largely made up of her own songs, appearing on the independent Pope Records label, and engineered by Mark Levinson. The album and its follow-up, 1996's Home of Whispers, were recorded live and marketed towards the audiophile community. A third release, Gone Is The Girl, a studio album with overdubs, came out in 1998 prior to the demise of the Pope label. This collection combined new Lieberman songs with some revisited material from her past. In 2003, Lieberman released another album of original material, Monterey, which came out via her own company, Drive On Records.

From 2009 onwards, Lieberman enjoyed increased visibility. Following the release of Gun Metal Sky (Drive On Records) in 2009, she became a major label recording artist for the first time since the 1970s when V2 Records (originally a subsidiary of Virgin Records and now part of the Universal Music Group) took up the option of remastering, repackaging and distributing Gun Metal Sky in territories outside America. For its European incarnation, the revised album appeared in 2010 under the new title Takes Courage. With funding and promotional support behind her, Lieberman started to tour Europe, drawing audiences sufficient in number to fill concert halls. 2011's swiftly released follow-up Bend Like Steel (Drive On/V2) consolidated her new-found success and led to her first forays into promotional videos. In 2012, Lieberman's most overtly political single, "Rise", a response to the global economic crisis and the inequitable division of wealth, was released worldwide with an accompanying video. "Rise" was included on Lieberman's 2013 album, Bricks Against The Glass (Drive On/Rough Trade Benelux).

== "Killing Me Softly" controversy ==
Since the mid-1990s as Lieberman's profile has grown, Gimbel and Fox have publicly denied the original working method they were reported to have established with Lieberman at the outset of her career, namely that Lieberman's own writing was the essential material from which their songs grew. This dispute has specifically focused on "Killing Me Softly with His Song", which had hitherto been said to have sprung from a poem written by Lieberman following her attendance at a Don McLean concert.

Despite previous claims to the contrary, both Gimbel and Fox asserted in print that Lieberman in fact had no involvement in the creation of the song. In contrast, Don McLean supported Lieberman both on his website and from the stage of a concert he invited her to attend in 2010. However, the matter reached an unequivocal conclusion only when contemporaneous articles from the early 1970s were exhumed, all of them vindicating Lieberman. On April 5, 1973, Gimbel had informed the Daily News, "She [Lori Lieberman] told us about this strong experience she had listening to McLean... I had a notion this might make a good song so the three of us discussed it. We talked it over several times, just as we did for the rest of the numbers we wrote for this album and we all felt it had possibilities.". Lieberman, Gimbel and Fox were described in a Billboard magazine article in 1973 as a songwriting team.

== Personal life ==
Lieberman's songwriting colleague Norman Gimbel carried on an extramarital affair with Lieberman after she began working with Gimbel and Fox as artist managers. Gimbel was married and 44 years old, and she was 20. The two kept the affair secret for years.

In 1979, Lieberman married film director Neal Israel. They divorced a year later.

In the 1980s, Lieberman had three children with her second husband, film and television composer Gary Scott, raising them in the hills above Malibu, California, along with horses and dogs.

In 1995, her neighbor, actor Joseph Cali, best-known for playing "Joey" in Saturday Night Fever, encouraged her to begin recording her songs again. After her second divorce, Lieberman married Cali.

== Discography ==
- Lori Lieberman (Capitol, 1972)
- Becoming (Capitol, 1973) US No. 192
- A Piece of Time (Capitol, 1974)
- Straw Colored Girl (Capitol, Bovema, EMI, 1975)
- The Best of Lori Lieberman (Capitol, Bovema, EMI, 1976)
- Letting Go (Millennium, Casablanca, RCA, 1978)
- Baby Songs: Christmas(Bill Elliott Music, ASCAP, 1991)
- A Thousand Dreams (Pope Music, 1995)
- Home of Whispers (Pope Music, 1996)
- Gone is the Girl (Pope Music, 1998)
- Monterey (Drive On Records, 2003)
- Gun Metal Sky (Drive On, 2009)
- Takes Courage (V2, 2010)
- Bend Like Steel (Drive On/V2, 2011)
- Bricks Against the Glass (Drive On/Rough Trade Benelux, 2013)
- Ready for the Storm (Butler Records, 2015)
- The Girl and the Cat (Butler, 2019)
- Truly (Drive On, 2022)
