= Today's FBI =

American television series 1981-1982

- Logo of Today's FBI
- Also known as: Today's F.B.I.
- Genre: Crime drama
- Written by: Rogers Turrentine
- Directed by: Harvey S. Laidman; Stan Jolley; Virgil W. Vogel
- Starring: Mike Connors; Carol Potter; Johnny Seven; Rick Hill; Harold Sylvester; Joseph Cali
- Opening theme: Elmer Bernstein
- Composers: Elmer Bernstein; John Cacavas; Charles R. Casey
- Country of origin: United States
- Original language: English
- No. of seasons: 1
- No. of episodes: 18, plus 1 TV-movie

Production
- Executive producer: David Gerber
- Editor: Herbert H. Dow
- Running time: 60 min.
- Production companies: David Gerber Productions; Columbia Pictures Television

Original release
- Network: ABC
- Release: October 25, 1981 – April 26, 1982

Related
- The F.B.I. (1965–1974)

Today's FBI is an American crime drama television series, an updated and revamped version of the earlier series The F.B.I.

Like the original program, this series is based on actual cases from the files of the Federal Bureau of Investigation, and the F.B.I. was involved in the making of the show. Unlike the original series, which ran for nine seasons, this show ran for only 18 episodes (following a TV-movie pilot) on ABC, during the 1981–82 season.

== Cast ==
- Mike Connors as Ben Slater, a veteran "G-Man" who is the chief and mentor of an elite unit of agents
- Joseph Cali as Nick Frazier, the one "ethnic" member of the team, a young and determined agent
- Carol Potter as Maggie Clinton, the one female member
- Rick Hill as Al Gordean, a "country boy" and strongman of the group, is often partnered with Nick
- Harold Sylvester as Dwayne Thompson, the one African American on the show; he often acts as the member who keeps the others focused

== Episodes ==
No.	Title	Original release date
0	"The Bureau"	October 25, 1981
TV-movie pilot; 2 hours. Mike Connors plays Ben Slater, a veteran G-man who heads an elite unit of agents. Slater and his team move to New York to investigate corruption on the waterfront. The target is Joey D'Amico, national vice president of the Stevedores Association of America, a man with a bad habit of exterminating dissenters. The key informant is Pete Kositchek, the owner of a company on the docks. Nick gets a job as the union leader's chauffeur. Joey becomes fond of the undercover agent, looking upon him as a younger version of himself.
1	"Hostage"	November 1, 1981
A religious leader (David Carradine) takes hostages in a Federal building, demanding that five inmates convicted of murdering members of his family and church be turned over to him — for execution.
2	"The Charleston Case"	November 8, 1981
Ben sets up a "sting" to break a distribution network for child pornography.
3	"Terror"	November 22, 1981
A paramilitary faction of the KKK terrorizes the black leaders of a Southern town.
4	"The Fugitive"	November 29, 1981
When three convicts escape from prison, Al learns that one of them is an old friend. Al decides to join the hunt; he starts by talking to his family to find out what went wrong.
5	"Career Move"	December 6, 1981
Small-time hoods luck into an $8 million heist, attracting the interest of both the FBI and the mob.
6	"The El Paso Murders"	December 13, 1981
Nick tries to nail a border guard suspected of the rape-murder of an illegal alien.
7	"Skyjack"	December 27, 1981
A mentally unstable skyjacker demands $3 million and safe passage to Libya.
8	"Spy"	January 10, 1982
A spy ring is selling American laser technology to the highest bidder.
9	"A Woman's Story"	January 17, 1982
An agent's marital woes may jeopardize an operation aimed at stopping a truck-hijacking ring.
10	"Hit List"	January 31, 1982
Mideast expatriates are being assassinated by a mercenary hired by their homeland.
11	"Deep Cover"	February 8, 1982
Ben fears an undercover agent is so involved that he may have forgotten which side he's on.
12	"Serpent in the Garden"	February 14, 1982
A medical lab is suspected of falsifying Medicare claims.
13	"Blue Collar"	February 21, 1982
The collapse of a building at a federally funded housing project prompts an investigation.
14	"Surfacing"	February 28, 1982
After 10 years underground, anarchists surface to kill a judge.
15	"Bank Job"	March 7, 1982
With the FBI hot on the trail, a team of bank robbers decides to pull one last job.
16	"Gulf Coast Murders"	March 14, 1982
An ex-cop attempts to steal cocaine from the police evidence storeroom.
17	"Kidnap"	April 19, 1982
Ben and his crew investigate the kidnapping of a Houston banker's son.
18	"Tapper"	April 26, 1982
A refinery whose output of gasoline is four times its intake of feedstock is targeted for investigation.

== Reception ==
The series suffered from low ratings as a result of direct competition from CBS's Top 20 hits Archie Bunker's Place and One Day at a Time and was cancelled after only 18 episodes.

According to Michele Malach of Fort Lewis College, the series attempted a more positive portrayal of the FBI by using diverse characters and a "fallacious assumption that its audience still viewed special agents as 'us' rather than 'them'," in contrast to federal agents with "a rigid, dogmatic, inhumane bureaucracy" depicted in later media, like Point Break, Betrayed, and The X-Files. Viewers "did not buy either the image or [the series]," prompting a cancellation. Richard Gib Powers called it "pointless and a cover-up [of] the FBI villainy[.]"
