= Legends! =

Legends! is a comedic play written by James Kirkwood, Jr. It toured the United States with Mary Martin and Carol Channing in 1986, but never had a production on Broadway. The play concerns two aging rival film stars. Kirkwood wrote about the tour's adventures in his memoir Diary of a Mad Playwright.

== Production history ==
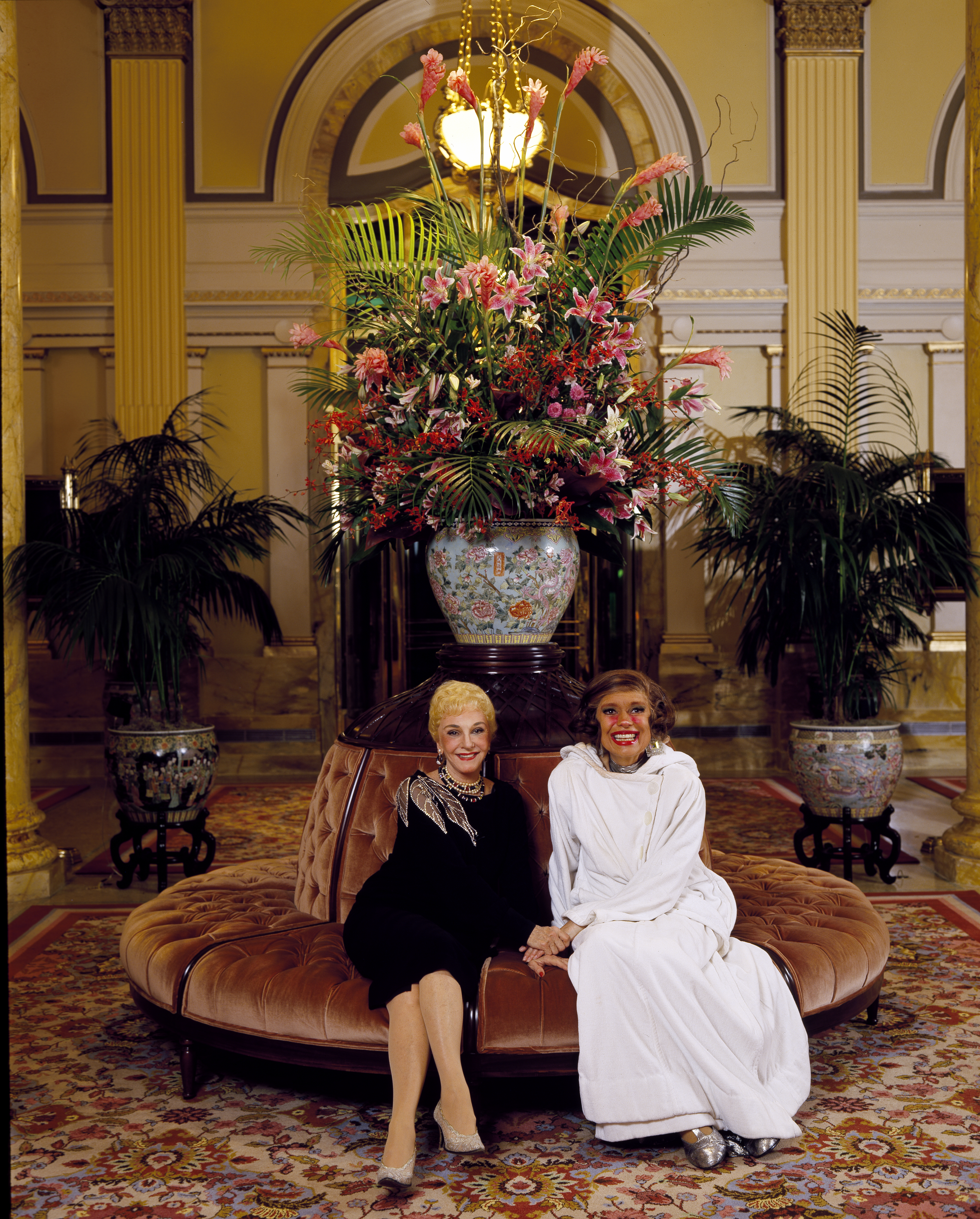
Mary Martin and Carol Channing, about 1986, in the lobby of the Willard Hotel

- Mary Martin and Carol Channing U.S. tour: Martin and Channing started the US tour in January 1986 in a Center Theatre Group world premiere production at the Ahmanson Theatre in Los Angeles, California and ended in Miami, Florida in January 1987, having played more than 300 performances. Although the producers of the show had hoped that it would open on Broadway, that did not happen. Martin left the production when her second-act speech about breast cancer was cut.
- Joan Collins and Linda Evans tour: Joan Collins toured North America with former Dynasty co-star Linda Evans. The tour started in September 2006 in Toronto and concluded in New Haven, Connecticut in May 2007 after a 30-week, multi-city tour.
- Lypsinka in New York: John Epperson, better known as Lypsinka has adapted the play for two men in drag, and presented a staged reading on March 23, 2009 in New York City. The reading, which featured Charles Busch, was a benefit for Friends in Deed - The Crisis Center for Life-Threatening Illness. In June 2010, Epperson brought the show to the Studio Theatre in Washington, DC, where he co-starred with James Lecesne.
- Hayley and Juliet Mills Australian tour: Legends! made its Australian premiere in 2015 with Hayley Mills and Juliet Mills: The production, which featured Juliet Mills' husband Maxwell Caulfield, debuted at the QPAC (Brisbane) with a 2–14 June run having previewed from 28 May, subsequently playing a second and final 18 June-5 July engagement at the Theatre Royal (Sydney).
