= Flatbush (TV series) =

- Genre: Sitcom
- Created by: David Epstein
- Directed by: William Asher; Mel Ferber; Harvey S. Laidman; Tony Mordente
- Starring: Joseph Cali; Adrian Zmed; Vincent Bufano; Randy Stumpf; Sandy Helberg
- Opening theme: "Stabilize"
- Composers: Dennis Lambert; Brian Potter; Mark Snow
- Country of origin: United States
- Original language: English
- No. of seasons: 1
- No. of episodes: 6 (3 unaired)

Production
- Executive producers: Philip Capice; Gary Adelson
- Producer: Norman S. Powell
- Running time: 30 minutes
- Production company: Lorimar Productions

Original release
- Network: CBS
- Release: February 26 – March 12, 1979

Flatbush is an American sitcom that aired on CBS for three weeks from February 26, 1979, to March 12, 1979. The original working title was The Flatbush Fungoes.

== Plot ==
The series followed five recent high school graduates living in the Flatbush section of Brooklyn: Presto, a cab driver; Socks, who worked in a clothing store; Figgy, a supermarket deliveryman; Joey, a plumber; and Turtle, who worked in his family's restaurant. Together they called themselves "The Fungos" as they roamed their neighborhood in search of innocent fun and excitement.

== Cast ==
- Joseph Cali as Presto Prestopopolos
- Adrian Zmed as Socks Palermo
- Vincent Bufano as Turtle Romero
- Randy Stumpf as Joey Dee
- Sandy Helberg as Figgy Figueroa
- Antony Ponzini as Esposito
- Helen Verbit as Mrs. Fortunato

== Episodes ==
A total of six episodes were produced, with three remaining unaired – "The Littlest Fungo", "The Wedding" and "Vooo Dooo" – because the ethnic stereotypes in the series so offended the real-life Brooklyn Borough President Howard Golden that he publicly demanded to CBS that it be canceled; it was taken off the air after only three telecasts.

No.	Title	Directed by	Written by	Original release date
1	"Kar Kannibals"	Unknown	Dennis Palumbo	February 26, 1979
The Fungos are involved in a wild car chase when their cherished auto, the Fungomobile, is stolen by a gang of car thieves.
2	"Moving Out"	William Asher	Dennis Palumbo	March 5, 1979
The Fungos' hearts go out to cantankerous old Mrs. Fortunato when they discover that she is being priced out of her apartment.
3	"The Heist"	Unknown	David Epstein	March 12, 1979
Presto becomes the innocent dupe of a hoodlum named Clean Otto who uses his taxi as the getaway car in a bank robbery.
4	"The Littlest Fungo"	N/A	N/A	Unaired
5	"The Wedding"	N/A	N/A	Unaired
6	"Vooo Dooo"	N/A	N/A	Unaired
