= There Must Be a Pony =

- Genre: Drama
- Based on: There Must Be a Pony by James Kirkwood Jr.
- Written by: James Kirkwood Jr.
- Screenplay by: Mart Crowley
- Directed by: Joseph Sargent
- Starring: Elizabeth Taylor; Robert Wagner; James Coco; William Windom; Chad Lowe
- Composer: Billy Goldenberg
- Country of origin: United States
- Original language: English

Production
- Executive producer: Robert Wagner
- Producer: Howard Jeffrey
- Cinematography: Gayne Rescher
- Editor: Jack Harnish
- Running time: 95 minutes
- Production companies: R.J. Productions; Columbia Pictures Television

Original release
- Network: ABC
- Release: October 5, 1986

There Must Be a Pony is a 1986 American made-for-television drama film directed by Joseph Sargent. It is based on the novel of the same name by James Kirkwood Jr., and the title refers to a common anecdote about optimism in the midst of adversity.

== Premise ==
Marguerite Sydney is a celebrated Hollywood star attempting a comeback after a stay in a mental hospital, as well as trying to re-establish a relationship with her teenage son Josh, and risking a romance with Ben Nichols, a mysterious new suitor.

== Cast ==
- Elizabeth Taylor as Marguerite Sydney
- Robert Wagner as Ben Nichols
- James Coco as Mervin Trellis
- William Windom as Lee Hertzig
- Edward Winter as David Hollis
- Ken Olin as Jay Savage
- Dick O'Neill as Chief Investigator Roy Clymer
- Chad Lowe as Josh Sydney

== Reception ==
"Miss Taylor and Mr. Lowe are worth the effort of watching but, in the end, the movie illustrates one of Marguerite's pearls of wisdom: 'Talk about grinding it out. TV brings new meaning to the words chopped liver," said The New York Times. People advised, "Think of this as a one-woman show, Elizabeth Taylor’s show, and you’ll be in for some moments to remember... If you own a VCR, tape this show, then speed through it, stopping only to savor Liz’s scenes. Then erase the tape."

== Awards ==
The film was nominated for the Primetime Emmy Award for Outstanding Art Direction for a Miniseries or Movie at the 39th Primetime Emmy Awards in 1987.
