= Sandy Helberg =

German-American actor

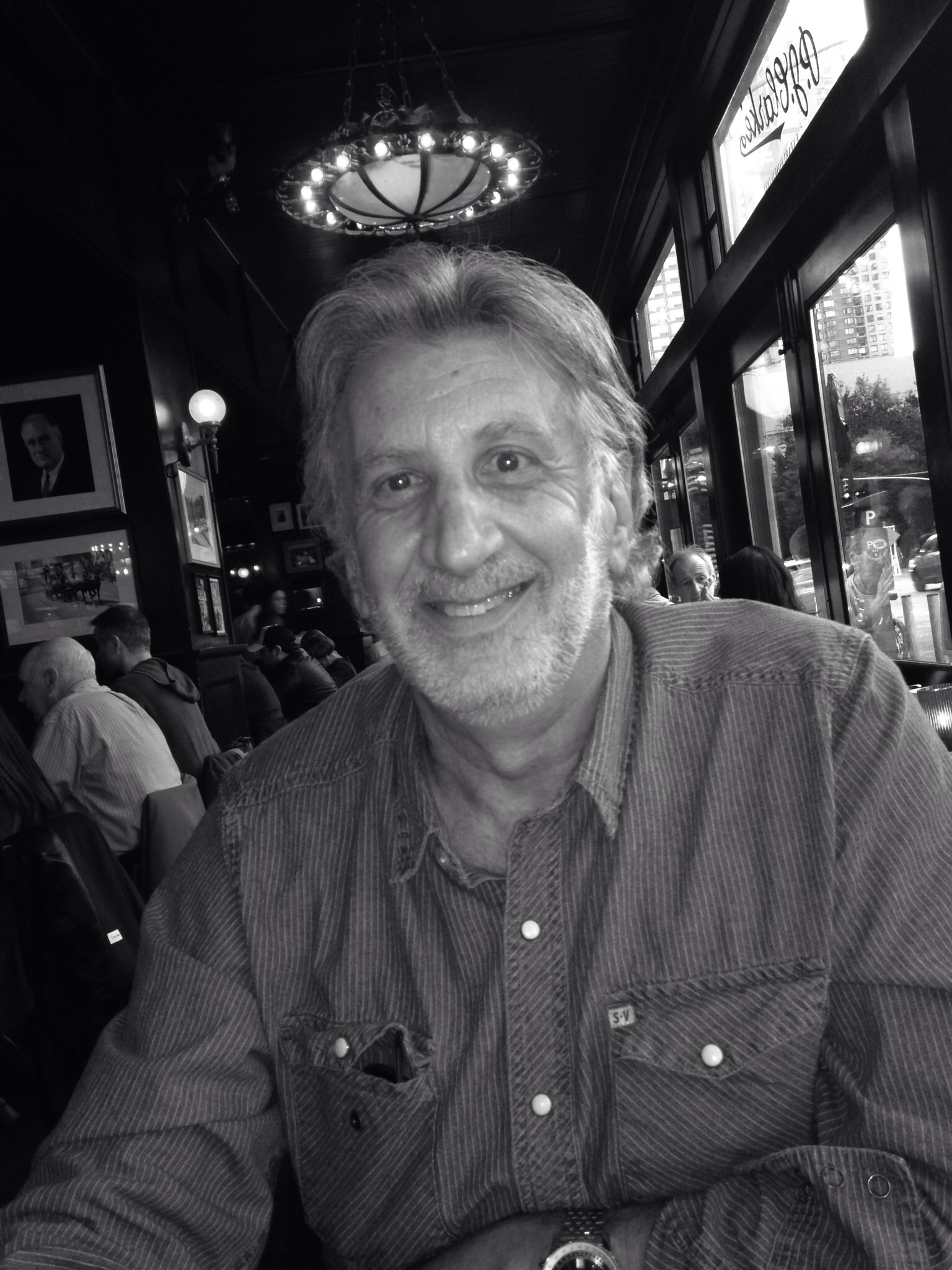
- Helberg in 2014
- Born: May 28, 1949 (age 77); Frankfurt, West Germany
- Occupation: Actor
- Years active: 1972–2012
- Spouse: Harriet Birnbaum (m. 1975)
- Children: 2, including Simon Helberg

Sandy Helberg (born May 28, 1949) is a German-born American actor.

== Early life ==
Helberg was born in Frankfurt, Germany, the son of Tonia (née Altman) and Sam Helberg. His parents were both Holocaust survivors from German-occupied Poland, who met in a concentration camp. They emigrated to the United States in 1950, where his father, originally a barber, eventually became a real estate developer in Toledo, Ohio, where Sandy and his brothers Ted and Tom were raised.

== Career ==
Helberg relocated to New York City and studied acting with Sanford Meisner at the Neighborhood Playhouse. He performed stand-up comedy and was part of an improv group that appeared in clubs in Greenwich Village. He later moved to Los Angeles, becoming an original member of the Los Angeles improv group, The Groundlings. Acting in several comedy films, in particular three Mel Brooks films High Anxiety, History of the World, Part I, and Spaceballs, he starred in the comedy films The Hollywood Knights and Up the Creek.

Helberg wrote and starred in the short-lived 1977 syndicated TV series The Lorenzo and Henrietta Music Show and the 1979 CBS TV series Flatbush. He has made numerous guest appearances on TV shows, including Trapper John, M.D., Remington Steele, Newhart, The Jeffersons, M*A*S*H, Married... with Children, The Wonder Years, Night Court, Fernwood 2 Night, Knight Rider, Too Close for Comfort, Get a Life, House Calls, Cybill, and Days of Our Lives among others.

Helberg co-starred in the NBC miniseries, 79 Park Avenue, and a CBS movie of the week, More Wild Wild West. He played Yeoman Purser Burl "Gopher" Smith in The Love Boat pilot; however, when it became an ABC television series, Fred Grandy took over the role.

Helberg and his wife Harriet wrote episodes for such television series as The Golden Girls, Perfect Strangers, Dear John, and Harry and the Hendersons. He also co-produced USO Salute to the Troops for HBO/TBS.

== Personal life ==
Helberg has been married to Harriet Birnbaum, a casting director, since 1975 and has two sons, Mason and Simon, the latter also an actor.

== Filmography ==
| Year | Title | Role | Notes |
|---|---|---|---|
| 1973 | Terror in the Wax Museum | Newsboy | Uncredited |
| 1975 | Sheila Levine Is Dead and Living in New York | Artist | |
| 1976 | A Star Is Born | Kevin | Uncredited |
| 1977 | High Anxiety | Airport Attendant | |
| 1977 | Prime Time a.k.a. American Raspberry | Mailman | |
| 1978 | Loose Shoes | Biker Eulogist | |
| 1980 | The Hollywood Knights | Officer Clark | |
| 1980 | The Jazz Singer | Sound Engineer | |
| 1981 | History of the World, Part I | Disciple | |
| 1981 | Modern Problems | Pete | |
| 1984 | This Is Spinal Tap | Angelo DiMentibelio | |
| 1984 | Up the Creek | Irwin | |
| 1987 | Spaceballs | Dr. Schlotkin | |
| 1994 | I'll Do Anything | Theater Critic | Uncredited |
| 1995 | The Granny | Albert | |
| 1995 | Mortal Kombat | Director | |
| 1997 | Meet Wally Sparks | Commercial Director | |
| 2006 | School for Scoundrels | Rabbi | |
