= James Kirkwood Jr. =

American playwright and actor (1924–1989)

James Kirkwood
- Kirkwood in 1975
- Born: James Kirkwood Jr. 22 August 1924; Los Angeles, California, U.S.
- Died: 21 April 1989 (aged 64); New York City, U.S.
- Parents: James Kirkwood Sr.; Lila Lee
- Writing career
- Notable work: P.S. Your Cat Is Dead
- Notable awards: Pulitzer Prize for Drama (1976)

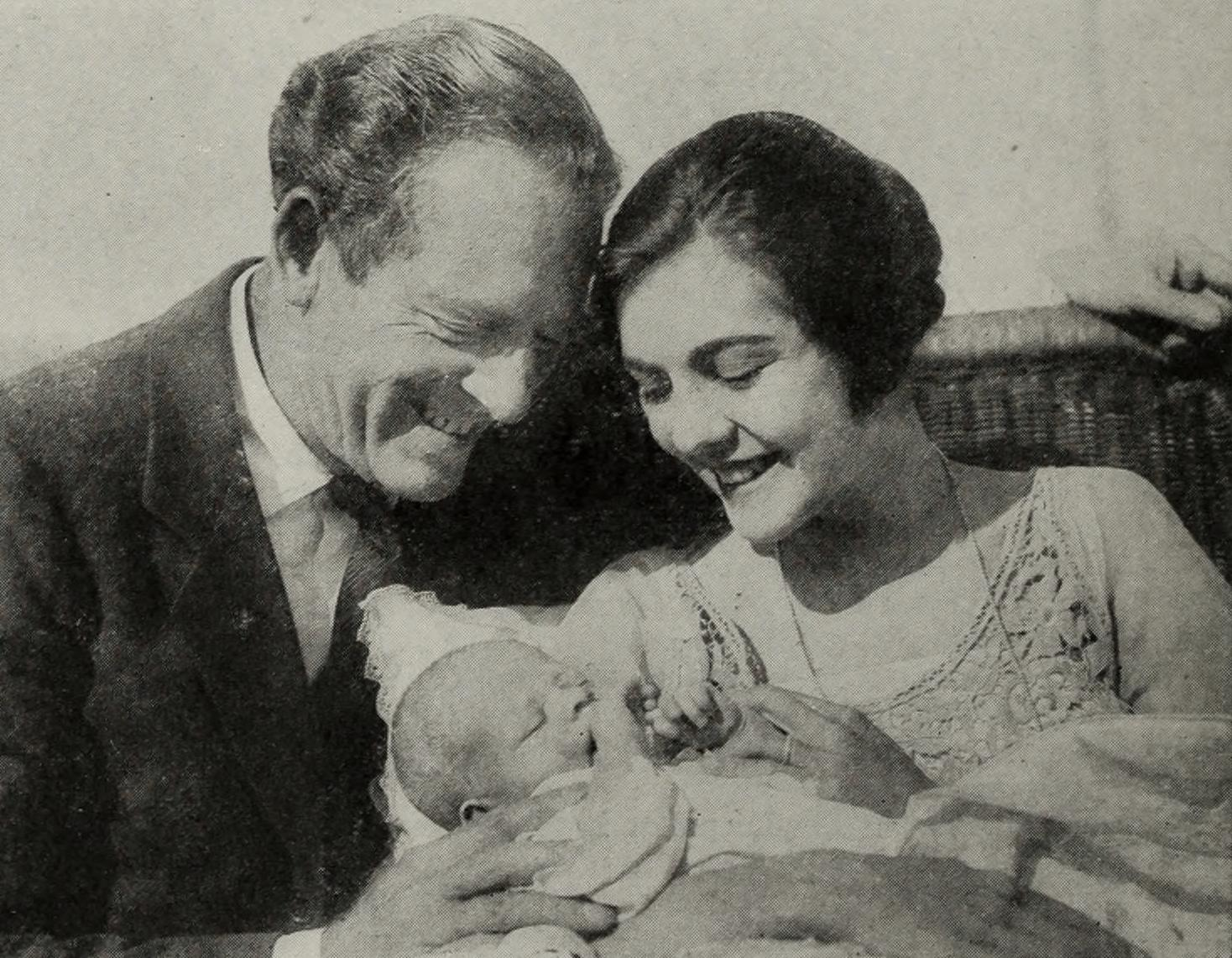
James Kirkwood Jr. as a baby with his parents James Kirkwood Sr. and Lila Lee in 1924.

James Kirkwood Jr. (August 22, 1924 – April 21, 1989) was an American playwright, author and actor. In 1976 he received the Tony Award, the Drama Desk Award for Outstanding Book of a Musical, and the Pulitzer Prize for Drama for the Broadway hit A Chorus Line.

== Biography ==
Kirkwood was born in Los Angeles. His father James Kirkwood Sr. was an actor and director in silent films, and his mother was actress Lila Lee. He had a half sister Joan Mary Kirkwood Thompson. After their divorce, he spent much of his time with his mother's family in Elyria, Ohio, where he graduated from high school.

=== Career ===
From 1953 to 1957, he played Mickey Emerson on the soap opera Valiant Lady. Kirkwood wrote the semi-autobiographical novel There Must Be a Pony!, made into a television film starring Elizabeth Taylor and Robert Wagner. Other novels include P.S. Your Cat Is Dead (adapted into a play of the same name, which was, in turn, adapted into a film by Steve Guttenberg), Good Times/Bad Times, Some Kind of Hero, and Hit Me with a Rainbow.

In 1959, Kirkwood appeared on Perry Mason as Johnny Baylor, son of Sen. Harriman Baylor, in "The Case of the Foot-Loose Doll."

In 1970, Simon & Schuster published Kirkwood's American Grotesque about the trial of Clay Shaw. Shaw, a New Orleans businessman, was tried by New Orleans District Attorney Jim Garrison on charges that he was involved in a conspiracy to assassinate United States President John F. Kennedy and later acquitted. Kirkus Reviews wrote that "Kirkwood's portrait of Shaw as St. Sebastian is overdone to the point of self defeat" and that "the book does clinch the impression that legal grounds for the conspiracy charges were insufficient."

Kirkwood won the 1976 Tony Award for Best Book of a Musical, the Drama Desk Award for Outstanding Book of a Musical, the New York Drama Critics' Circle Award, and the Pulitzer Prize for Drama with collaborator Nicholas Dante for A Chorus Line.

Kirkwood also wrote the comedic play Legends! which toured the United States with Mary Martin and Carol Channing in 1987. The plot concerns a producer with a sure-fire commercial script, but no credibility, who lures two out-of-work but long-time feuding actresses "of a certain age" to star in his putative Broadway production. Legends! was the most financially successful road production of that season, but at some point during the tour, the actress declared she would complete her contractual obligation for the tour but would not open the play on Broadway, and the show closed on the road. There were apparently multiple reasons for Martin's decision, including her disappointment that a scene including a monologue about breast cancer by her character was cut from the script, as well as the fact that Martin was having trouble remembering her lines, and tensions and conflicts with her co-star had developed during the tour. Kirkwood wrote a book about the production of Legends! titled Diary of a Mad Playwright: Perilous Adventures on the Road with Mary Martin and Carol Channing.

A revival of Legends! was mounted with Joan Collins and Linda Evans of Dynasty fame. It toured more than 30 cities in the United States and Canada beginning in autumn 2006, but did not appear on Broadway as had been planned.

=== Personal life ===
In 1968, Kirkwood signed the "Writers and Editors War Tax Protest" pledge, vowing to refuse tax payments in protest against the Vietnam War (his novel Some Kind of Hero is centered on a prisoner of war in, and back home from, Vietnam).

Kirkwood died in his Manhattan apartment of AIDS-related complications in 1989.

=== Literary prize ===
In Kirkwood's memory, his friends and admirers established the James Kirkwood Literary Prize to honor new generations of fiction writers for their literary achievements. The competition is hosted by the UCLA Extension Writers' Program, and the winner is determined by Andrew Morse, the prize's benefactor.

== Works ==
=== Novels ===
- There Must Be a Pony!
- Good Times/Bad Times
- Hit Me with a Rainbow
- Some Kind of Hero (adapted by Kirkwood into the film of the same name)
- P.S. Your Cat Is Dead
- I Teach Flying (unfinished)

=== Plays ===
- U.T.B.U. (Unhealthy To Be Unpleasant)
- Legends!
- A Chorus Line (book – co-authored with Nicholas Dante)
- Stage Stuck (co-authored with Jim Piazza)

=== Nonfiction ===
- American Grotesque: An Account of the Clay Shaw-Jim Garrison Affair in the City of New Orleans (Simon and Schuster, 1970)
- Diary of a Mad Playwright: Perilous Adventures on the Road with Mary Martin and Carol Channing, about production of the play Legends! (Dutton, 1989)

== Filmography ==
Year	Title	Role	Notes
1958	Alfred Hitchcock Presents	Dave	Season 4 Episode 3: "The Jokester"
1980	Oh, God! Book II	Psychiatrist 2	
1981	Mommie Dearest	Master of Ceremonies	
1986	The Supernaturals	Captain	(final film role)
