= Joseph Cali =

American actor (born 1950)

- Born: March 30, 1950 (age 76); New York City, New York, U.S.
- Occupations: Actor, music producer
- Years active: 1977–present

Joseph Cali (born March 30, 1950) is an American actor known for playing the role of Joey in the 1977 film Saturday Night Fever. Post Saturday Night Fever, he appeared on television and in films such as 1979's Voices, The Competition, and Suicide Kings.

== Biography ==
Cali is a graduate of Siena College in Loudonville, New York. He currently owns and operates a home theater business in Los Angeles, Joseph Cali Systems Design Inc.. He is married to recording artist Lori Lieberman.

== Filmography ==
Film and Television
Year	Title	Role	Notes
1977	Saturday Night Fever	Joey	Feature film
1979	Flatbush	Presto Prestopopolos	Main cast (6 episodes)
1979	Voices	Pinky	Feature film
1980	The Competition	Jerry DiSalvo	Feature film
1981	Trapper John, M.D.	Officer Joey Santori	Episode: "Straight and Narrow"
1981–1982	Today's FBI	Nick Frazier	Main cast (17 episodes)
1983	The Lonely Lady	Vincent Dacosta	Feature film
1984	Too Close for Comfort	Mike Lassiter	Episode: "High and Inside"
1985	Hunter	Tony Boy	Episode: "The Snow Queen" Parts 1 & 2
1985	Murder, She Wrote	Vic LaRosa	Episode: "Murder at the Oasis"
1986	Blacke's Magic	Michael Angels	Episode: "Breathing Room"
1986	9 to 5	Minelli	Episode: "The Naked City"
1988	Ohara	Agent Kirk	Episode: "What's in a Name"
1988	Something Is Out There	Roger	TV miniseries
1988	Sonny Spoon	Nick	Episode: "Ratman Can"
1989	Almost Grown	Groomsman	Episode: "The Hat The Fell from Space"
1989	Freddy's Nightmares	Joe	Episodes: "Memory Overload" and "Monkey Dreams"
1989	Alien Nation	Lee Smith	Episode: "Gimme, Gimme"
1989–1990	Santa Barbara	Jack Dante	Main cast (16 episodes)
1990	Murder, She Wrote	Priest	Episode: "The Sicilian Encounter"
1992	Murder Without Motive: The Edmund Perry Story	Louie Bottone	TV film
1992	Jake and the Fatman	Priest	Episode: "Pennies from Heaven"
1992	Silk Stalkings	Vinnie LoCerno / Joey V	Episode: "Working Girl"
1992–1993	Renegade	Swenson's Henchman #1 / Sonny Caruso	2 episodes
1994	Murder, She Wrote	Paul Grimaldi	Episode: "Crimson Harvest"
1995	The Commish	Doug Duncan	Episode: "Letting Go"
1995	Charlie Grace	Robert Castelli	Episode: "Designer Knock-Off"
1996	Silk Stalkings	Martin Greenwald	Episode: "Black and Blue"
1997	L.A. Heat	Ray Bernard	Episode: "Silicon Sting"
1997	Melrose Place	George	2 episodes
1997	Suicide Kings	Nick the Nose	Feature film
1997	Baywatch	Bar Owner	Episode: "Homecoming"
1998	Port Charles	Robert "Bobby" Mancusi	Unknown episodes
2000	18 Wheels of Justice	Ray Natale	Episode: "A Prize Possession"
