= Grease 2 =

1982 musical romantic comedy film by Patricia Birch

- Theatrical release poster
- Directed by: Patricia Birch
- Written by: Ken Finkleman
- Based on: Characters by: Jim Jacobs; Warren Casey
- Produced by: Robert Stigwood
- Starring: Maxwell Caulfield; Michelle Pfeiffer; Adrian Zmed; Lorna Luft; Didi Conn; Eve Arden; Sid Caesar; Dody Goodman; Tab Hunter; Connie Stevens
- Cinematography: Frank Stanley
- Edited by: John F. Burnett
- Music by: Louis St. Louis
- Production companies: Paramount Pictures; Allan Carr Enterprises; Stigwood Group
- Distributed by: Paramount Pictures
- Release date: June 11, 1982
- Running time: 114 minutes
- Country: United States
- Language: English
- Budget: $11.2 million
- Box office: $15.2 million

Grease 2 is a 1982 American musical romantic comedy film and a standalone sequel to the 1978 film Grease, adapted from the 1971 musical of the same name by Jim Jacobs and Warren Casey. Originally titled More Grease, the film was produced by Allan Carr and Robert Stigwood, and directed and choreographed by Patricia Birch, who choreographed the original stage production and prior film. The plot returns to Rydell High School two years after the original film's graduation, with a largely new cast, led by Maxwell Caulfield and Michelle Pfeiffer in her first starring role.

The film was released in United States theaters on June 11, 1982 by Paramount Pictures, and grossed $15 million against a production budget of $11 million, a far cry from its predecessor's $132 million domestic box office. Despite breakthrough roles for Pfeiffer, Adrian Zmed, and Christopher McDonald, the film received mostly mixed to negative reviews from critics; however, Grease 2 maintains a devoted fan base decades after its release. The film is now regarded as a cult classic.

== Plot ==
In September 1961, two years after the events of the prior film ("Alma Mater" from the original stage musical), Principal McGee and her secretary Blanche react in horror as students arrive at Rydell High to start a new academic year ("Back to School Again"). Among them are the trendy "bad-girl" Pink Ladies and the laid-back, motorcycle-riding ruffian T-Birds. Stephanie Zinone, the new leader of the Pink Ladies, feels she has "outgrown" her relationship with ex-boyfriend Johnny Nogerelli, the arrogant, chauvinistic and rather immature bully leader of the T-Birds.

Clean-cut British student Michael Carrington (a cousin of Sandy Olsson from the previous film) is introduced to the atmosphere by former Pink Lady Frenchy, who offers to orient him. She has returned to Rydell to obtain her diploma so she can start her own cosmetics company (as preluded with "Beauty School Dropout" in the previous film). Michael eventually meets Stephanie, and quickly becomes smitten with her.

At the local bowling alley, a game between both cliques ("Score Tonight") turns hostile between Johnny and Stephanie, culminating in him kissing her friend Paulette Rebchuck. In retaliation, Stephanie kisses the next man who walks in the door, who happens to be Michael. Bemused by the unexpected kiss, Michael asks her out the next day at an audition for the upcoming school talent show, but learns she has standards for her ideal suitor ("Cool Rider"). Attempting to appropriately attain her affection, Michael starts covertly selling completed homework assignments and term papers to the academically-challenged T-Birds to save enough money for a motorcycle. Meanwhile, substitute teacher Mr. Stuart leads a rousing biology lesson ("Reproduction").

Rival motorcycle gang the Cycle Lords, led by Leo "Craterface" Balmudo, surprises the T-Birds at the bowling alley. Before a fight ensues, a lone, mysterious "Cool Rider" arrives, defeats the enemy gang, and disappears into the night ("Who's That Guy?"), astounding Stephanie. Meanwhile, T-Bird Louis DiMucci attempts to trick his sweetheart, Pink Lady Sharon Cooper, into losing her virginity to him by taking her to a fallout shelter and faking a nuclear attack ("Let's Do It for Our Country").

While Stephanie is working at her after-school job as an automobile mechanic at her family's gas station/auto garage, the Cool Rider surprises her with a romantic twilight motorcycle ride to a hilltop. Before he can reveal his identity, the T-Birds and Pink Ladies interrupt them, and he vows to reunite with her at the talent show. Johnny, enraged by Stephanie's new romance, threatens physical violence towards the Cool Rider if her new relationship continues. The Pink Ladies depart haughtily, ignoring the T-Birds' self-confidence ("Prowlin'").

At school, Stephanie's dismal grades in English lead her to accept Michael's offer of help. Johnny, having witnessed their encounter, demands that Stephanie denounce her association with the Pink Ladies to preserve his honor. Although she is still enchanted by the mysterious Cool Rider, her romantic interactions with Michael pressure him into questioning his facade ("Charades").

Stephanie and the Cool Rider reunite at the talent show but the T-Birds abruptly ambush them and pursue him to a closed-off construction site on their respective motorcycles, with the Pink Ladies following in a car. The site conceals a deadly drop, and the biker's absence suggests that he has gone over the edge and perished, devastating Stephanie. Prior to "Prowlin'", the T-Birds sabotage the competing Preptones by tying them to a shower pole in the boys' locker room. During the Pink Ladies' performance ("Girl for All Seasons"), an emotional Stephanie obliviously enters a dreamlike, fantasy world, where she reunites with her mystery biker ("(Love Will) Turn Back the Hands of Time"). She is named winner of the contest, and she and Johnny crowned Queen and King of the upcoming graduation luau.

The Cycle Lords gatecrash the luau the following day ("Rock-a-Hula Luau (Summer Is Coming)"), but the Cool Rider reappears, overpowers them, and reveals himself as Michael. Initially shocked, Johnny subsequently presents him with a T-Birds jacket, officially welcoming him into the gang, and Michael and an overjoyed Stephanie cement their relationship with a passionate kiss. All the couples pair-off happily, and after the senior class graduates ("We'll Be Together"), the credits roll in yearbook-style, as in the original film ("Back to School Again").

== Cast ==
=== Principal cast ===
==== Lead roles ====
- Maxwell Caulfield as Michael Carrington
- Michelle Pfeiffer as Stephanie Zinone

==== The T-Birds ====
- Adrian Zmed as Johnny Nogerelli
- Christopher McDonald as Goose McKenzie
- Peter Frechette as Louis DiMucci
- Leif Green as Davey Jaworski

==== The Pink Ladies ====
- Maureen Teefy as Sharon Cooper
- Lorna Luft as Paulette Rebchuck
- Alison Price as Rhonda Ritter
- Pamela Segall as Dolores Rebchuck

=== Reprising roles from Grease ===
- Didi Conn as Frenchy
- Eve Arden as Principal McGee
- Sid Caesar as Coach Calhoun
- Dody Goodman as Blanche Hodel
- Eddie Deezen as Eugene Felsnick
- Dennis Stewart as Balmudo

=== Playing different roles from Grease ===
- Dick Patterson as Mr. Spears

=== Supporting cast ===
- Tab Hunter as Mr. Stuart
- Connie Stevens as Miss Mason
- Jean and Liz Sagal as the Sorority / Cheerleader Twins
- Matt Lattanzi as Brad
- Donna King as Girl Greaser (lead dancer)
- Lucinda Dickey as Girl Greaser
- Ivy Austin as Girl Greaser 'Francine'
- Andy Tennant as Boy Greaser 'Artie' (Arnold in Grease)
- Tom Villard as Boy Greaser 'Willie' (performs "Cry" at the talent show)
- Vernon Scott as Henry Dickey, one of the Prep-Tones
- Tom Willett as bowling alley manager (uncredited)
- Janet Jones as the girl who missed her last two periods (uncredited)

== Production ==
=== Development ===
Grease co-producer Allan Carr had a deal with Paramount Pictures to be paid $5 million to produce a sequel, with production beginning within three years of the original film. Carr decided to hire Patricia Birch as director for the sequel, as she had previously served as the choreographer for the stage and film versions of Grease. Birch was initially hesitant to accept after learning that neither composers Jim Jacobs and Warren Casey nor John Travolta and Olivia Newton-John would be involved in the film. Bronte Woodard, the writer who adapted the original stage material for the original film, had died in 1980, and Canadian comic Ken Finkleman (who was also writing and directing Airplane II at the same time) was tasked with penning a new script mostly from scratch. The total budget for the production was $11.2 million, almost double the budget of the original. Birch's approach to the material was to hew closer to the original, grittier stage productions from which Grease came; she had resisted changes made to the original film (largely made at Newton-John's behest) but was overruled.

Grease 2 was intended to be the second film (and first sequel) in a proposed Grease franchise of four films and a television series. (The third and fourth films were to take place in the 1960s and during the counterculture era.) However, the projects were scrapped due to the underwhelming box office performance of Grease 2. Maxwell Caulfield was unhappy with the film's "drab" title, and unsuccessfully lobbied to change it to Son of Grease.

=== Casting ===
Birch proposed an idea to feature Travolta and Newton-John reprising their characters as a now married couple running a gas station near the end of the film, with Travolta to sing a new number "Gas Pump Jockey;" this did not come to fruition. Newton-John rejected the offer to return, as she was more interested in doing Xanadu. Paramount tried to get Jeff Conaway and Stockard Channing from the first film to do cameos but this did not happen (Channing, by then 37 years old, had left Hollywood for a time in the early 1980s to focus on her stage career). Early plans for Grease 2 had Conaway and Channing's characters, Kenickie and Rizzo, as main characters while they attended summer school, which would have culminated in the two getting married.

Andy Gibb was screen tested to play the male lead but this proved unsatisfactory. At one stage Timothy Hutton was announced as the male lead, and Carr later claimed after Grease 2 was released "Hutton came, sang, and danced in my living room. He had done Guys and Dolls in college, and that’s who I wanted and preferred. But they didn’t consider him sexy enough.”

Maxwell Caulfield was cast after impressing producers off-Broadway in Entertaining Mr. Sloane. Having seen his performances, Allan Carr offered Caulfield the role of Michael over thousands of applicants.

“They were all in love with Maxwell,” said Patricia Birch. “Robert and Allan saw him onstage without his clothes."

Unlike co-star Pfeiffer, Caulfield's career following Grease 2 was damaged by the film's failure. He has been quoted as saying: "Before Grease 2 came out, I was being hailed as the next Richard Gere or John Travolta. However, when Grease 2 flopped, nobody would touch me. It felt like a bucket of cold water had been thrown in my face. It took me 10 years to get over Grease 2."

With only a few television roles and small film appearances, Michelle Pfeiffer, then aged 23, was a relatively unknown actress when she attended the casting call audition for the role of Stephanie. Other actresses considered for the part included Lisa Hartman, Kristy McNichol, Andrea McArdle, and singer Pat Benatar. Pfeiffer was a wild card choice, but according to Birch, she won the part because she "has a quirky quality you don't expect." She later commented on being cast:

That was really weird for me. I'd been taking singing lessons and I had taken dance, because I loved to dance, but I had never considered myself a professional at all. I went on this audition as a fluke, and somehow, through the process of going back and dancing, and then going back and singing, I ended up getting the part. I went crazy with that movie. I came to New York and the paparazzi were waiting at the hotel. I know the producers put them up to it. I am basically very private, and I'm really nervous about doing publicity. Every time I set up an interview, I say, "That's it, this is my last one. I'll do this because I committed to doing it, but I'm never doing another one." It was insane.

Lorna Luft was the last star cast. The part played by Connie Stevens was originally meant for Annette Funicello but she was unable to appear because her schedule as Skippy peanut butter spokeswoman did not allow her time to film the scene.

Adrian Zmed had previously played the role of Danny Zuko in the stage version of Grease, a role he would later reprise in the 1990s.

=== Filming ===
Scenes at Rydell High School were filmed at Excelsior High School, a recently closed high school in Norwalk, California. Filming took place throughout a 58-day shooting schedule during the autumn of 1981. According to director Birch, the script was still incomplete when filming commenced. Sequences that were filmed but cut during post-production include scenes in which Frenchy helps Michael become a motorcycle rider, and a sequence at the end of the film showing Michael and Stephanie flying off into the sky on a motorcycle.

In the film, after Stephanie wins the contest, it goes on to show the luau in the final scene. Originally, there were a few minutes dedicated to a scene in which Michael (believed to be dead in his alter ego, by Stephanie) comes out on stage as Stephanie is exiting the stage, unbeknownst to her that he is the cool rider and he is alive. He attempts to ask her what's wrong and she storms past him and runs off crying, then it cuts to the luau. There was a scene within the "Who's that Guy?" number in which Goose accidentally smashes Rhonda's nose at the Bowl-A-Rama door. None of these scenes have been shown since the film's release.

== Music ==
Grease 2

Soundtrack album
- Released: 1982
- Recorded: 1981
- Length: 32:28
- Labels: RSO (Original issue); Polydor (Re-issue)

Professional ratings
Review scores
Source	Rating
AllMusic	link

1. "Back to School Again" – Cast and The Four Tops (verses by the Pink Ladies are absent from the soundtrack)
2. "Score Tonight" – T-Birds, Pink Ladies, Cast
3. "Brad" – Sorority / Cheerleader Twins
4. "Cool Rider" – Stephanie
5. "Reproduction" – Mr. Stuart and Students
6. "Who's That Guy?" – Michael, T-Birds, Pink Ladies, Cycle Lords, and Cast
7. "Do It for Our Country" – Louis and Sharon (Sharon's part is absent from the soundtrack)
8. "Prowlin'" – Johnny and T-Birds
9. "Charades" – Michael
10. "Girl for All Seasons" – Sharon, Paulette, Rhonda, and Stephanie
11. "(Love Will) Turn Back the Hands of Time" – Stephanie and Michael
12. "Rock-a-Hula Luau (Summer Is Coming)" – Cast
13. "We'll Be Together" – Michael, Stephanie, Johnny, Paulette, and Cast

Featured as background music at Rydell Sport Field:

1. "Moon River" (The Spirit of Troy- University of Southern California Marching Band)

Featured as background music at the bowling alley:

1. "Our Day Will Come" – Ruby & The Romantics (Grease 2 takes place in 1961–62 and "Our Day Will Come" did not come out until 1963)
2. "Rebel Walk" – Duane Eddy (this was the B-side of his biggest hit "Because They're Young")

Featured at the beginning:

1. "Alma Mater" – Instrumental (this song was played at the beginning when Principal McGee and Blanche put up the 1961 Rydell flag)

== Release ==
=== Box office ===
The sequel took in just over $15 million after coming at fifth on opening weekend behind E.T.: The Extra-Terrestrial, Star Trek II: The Wrath of Khan, Rocky III, and Poltergeist.

Caulfield explained the film's contemporaneous commercial underperformance: "Basically we just got blown off the map by that little movie by Spielberg..., what was it called?, something like E.T. or something."

=== Critical response ===
On Rotten Tomatoes, the film had an approval rating of 22% based on 89 reviews. The site's consensus reads, "Grease 2 is undeniably stocked with solid songs and well-choreographed dance sequences, but there's no getting around the fact that it's a blatant retread of its far more entertaining predecessor." As of August 2025, on Metacritic it had a score of 52% based on reviews from 11 critics, indicating "mixed or average" reviews.

Janet Maslin of The New York Times condemned the film as "dizzy and slight, with an even more negligible plot than its predecessor had. This time the story can't even masquerade as an excuse for stringing the songs together. Songs? What songs? The numbers in Grease 2 are so hopelessly insubstantial that the cast is forced to burst into melody about pastimes like bowling."

Variety commended the staging of the musical numbers, writing that Patricia Birch has come up with some unusual settings (a bowling alley, a bomb shelter) for some of the scenes, and employs some sharp montage to give most of the songs and dances a fair amount of punch."

Roger Ebert of the Chicago Sun-Times gave the film 2 stars out of 4, saying: "This movie just recycles Grease, without the stars, without the energy, without the freshness and without the grease."

Pfeiffer received positive notices for her first major role. The New York Times review cited her performance as the "one improvement" on the original film: "Miss Pfeiffer is as gorgeous as any cover girl, and she has a sullen quality that's more fitting to a Grease character than Miss Newton-John's sunniness was." Variety wrote that she was "all anyone could ask for in the looks department, and she fills Olivia Newton-John's shoes and tight pants very well." Pfeiffer told the Los Angeles Times three years later:

That film was a good experience for me. It taught me a valuable lesson. Before it even came out the hype had started. Maxwell and I were being thrust down the public's throat in huge full page advertisements. There was no way we could live up to any of that and we didn't. So the crash was very loud. But it did teach me not to have expectations.

Barry Diller of Paramount said that the film "on no level is as good as the first. The quality isn't there."

Jim Jacobs described it at the time as "awful ... the pits." In an interview 27 years later, Jacobs noted that Grease 2 "still brings a brief frown to his face."

During an appearance for Rotten Tomatoes to promote the film Tick, Tick... Boom!, actor Andrew Garfield cited the film as one of his five favorite musicals, calling it "great".

=== Accolades ===
Pfeiffer was nominated for a 1982 Young Artist Award in the category of Best Young Motion Picture Actress. Grease 2 was nominated for a 1982 Young Artist Award in the category for Best Family Feature: Animated, Musical or Fantasy.

The film was nominated for a Stinkers Bad Movie Awards for Worst Picture. Later on, the Stinkers would unveil their picks for the 100 worst films of the 20th century with their "100 Years, 100 Stinkers" list. Grease 2 ranked in the listed bottom 20 at #13.

The film was given a special screening at the 2021 online TCM Festival.

== Home media ==
Grease 2 was released in the US on VHS and Betamax by Paramount Home Video on November 3, 1982 (with original film poster artwork on the cover), 1990 (Double Box Set of Grease and Grease 2) with modified VHS cover for Grease 2, December 7, 1992, 1993, the last VHS release was on June 23, 1998 (with modified VHS cover upclose view of Maxwell Caulfield and Michelle Pfeiffer, similar to Grease posters and home releases with John Travolta and Olivia Newton-John) the same day Grease had its 20th Anniversary Edition released.

The film was released also on RCA Capacitance Electronic Disc (CED) in 1983 by Paramount Home Video and Laserdisc Extended Play by Paramount Home Video.

On September 17, 2002 it was released on DVD for the first time. June 10, 2003 (Widescreen Collection) it was re-released on DVD in Widescreen Letterbox format for the first time, 2004, November 6, 2006, August 5, 2008 (I Love the 80's Edition with changed artwork for Maxwell Caulfield and Michelle Pfeiffer on the cover), January 1, 2023, by Paramount Home Media Distribution. On March 12, 2013, Grease and Grease 2 were packaged together in a double feature DVD set from Warner Home Video.

In 2018 Grease 2 was released on Blu-ray for the first time. In connection with the film's 40th anniversary of Grease, Paramount released Grease on 4K Ultra HD Blu-ray, Blu-ray and DVD on April 24, 2018. along with Grease 2 and Grease Live! in Collectors Steelbox Edition.

On June 7, 2022 in connection with the film's 40th anniversary of Grease 2, Paramount released Grease 2 in Steelbox Edition by Paramount Home Entertainment.

The Steelbox Edition has artistic, stylized renders of Michael Carrington (Maxwell Caulfield) and Stephanie Zinone (Michelle Pfeiffer) against a glossy light-blue background for the front cover. The back cover features a dramatic, white lightning streak design, incorporating a small image of "The Cool Rider" on his motorcycle (from "Who's That Guy?" scene). Similar to the artistic, stylized renders of Danny Zuko (John Travolta) and Sandy Olsson (Olivia Newton-John) that was used for the 40th anniversary 4K Ultra HD+Blu-Ray+Digital version of Grease four years earlier.

== Remake ==
The film's screenplay was adapted into the Indian feature film Premaloka, starring Ravichandran and Juhi Chawla, released in 1987, which went on to become a blockbuster.

== Plans for a third film ==
In 2003, Olivia Newton-John confirmed that a second sequel was being developed. "They're writing it, and we'll see what happens. If the script looks good, I'll do it. But I haven't seen the script, and it has to be cleverly done." Newton-John died in 2022.

In 2008, it was reported that Paramount was planning a new sequel to Grease that would debut straight to DVD. However, the project never came to fruition.

In 2019, it was announced that a prequel to the original film entitled Summer Lovin' with John August attached to write the screenplay was in the works at Paramount.

== Stage musical ==
The film was later adapted into a musical, Cool Rider, with the script re-written and modified for the stage.
