= Adrian Zmed =

American actor (born 1954)

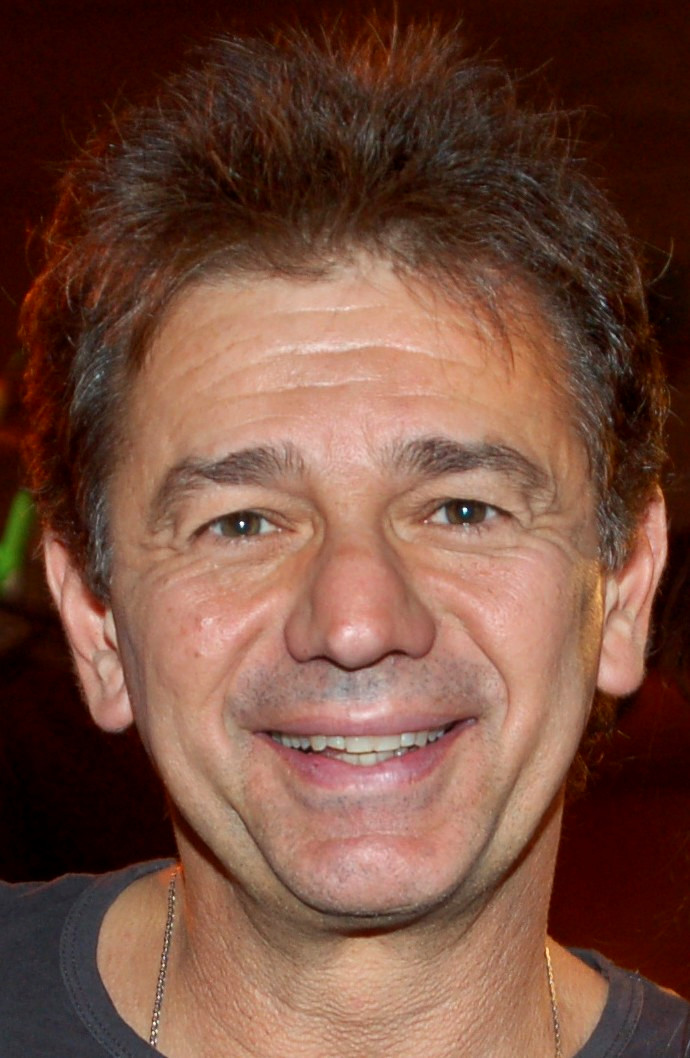
- Zmed in October 2008
- Born: Adrian George Zmed; March 14, 1954 (age 72); Chicago, Illinois, U.S.
- Occupations: Actor, singer and television personality
- Years active: 1978–present
- Spouses: Barbara Fitzner (m. 1976): Susan Wood (1995–?); Lynne Baker (m. 2012)
- Children: 2

Adrian George Zmed (born March 14, 1954) is an American actor, singer and television personality, noted for the roles of Johnny Nogerelli in Grease 2 and Officer Vince Romano in the T. J. Hooker television series. His Broadway credits include the starring roles of Danny Zuko in Grease and Marvin in Falsettos.

== Early life ==
Zmed was born in Chicago, Illinois, the youngest of three sons of George Zmed, later known as George Zmed-Smith (1916–2010), a Romanian Orthodox priest, who served from 1952 until his retirement in 1983, and his wife, Persida (née Golub) Zmed, later known as Sadie Smith (1923–2015). His father George was a Romanian American born in Chicago to Nicolae and Paraschiva (née Bălan), who had emigrated from Nagykomlós, Temes County, Hungary (now Comloșu Mare, Timiș County, Romania) in the early 20th century. At the age of five, George and his family went to Romania, where he was educated, and returned to the United States in November 1952. His mother Persida was born in Romania. George and Persida were married October 15, 1942, in Timișoara. The couple had three sons, in the following order: Cornel, Walter, and Adrian.

Adrian graduated from Lane Tech High School in Chicago. He began playing football for the school's team until, when playing in 1968, he broke his leg which in turn punctured a major artery. He quit sports and began acting, appearing in his high school's production of Guys and Dolls. After being featured on a local TV show as one of Chicago's top high school performers, Zmed transferred to the Goodman School of Drama and began studying voice at the Chicago Conservatory of Music. He graduated with a Bachelor of Fine Arts from the Goodman School of Drama.

== Career ==
Zmed's first major acting gig was the role of Johnny in the national touring company production of Grease. He later appeared in the Broadway musical three times, twice in the role of Danny. At 40, Zmed revived the role of Danny in the 1995 Broadway revival.

=== Television ===
In 1978, Zmed made his television debut, appearing as Marty Decker in an episode of Starsky & Hutch. From there, he won the role of Socks Palermo in the short-lived television series Flatbush (1979). Following the show's cancellation, he was cast as Frankie Millardo in Goodtime Girls, which lasted one season (1980). He had guest roles on such series as Angie, I'm a Big Girl Now and Bosom Buddies, and made a guest appearance on An Evening at the Improv in 1982.

Zmed reached celebrity status as Officer Romano in ABC's T. J. Hooker. He played Fred Feliciano in Victims for Victims: The Theresa Saldana Story (1984) and made guest appearances on a number of television shows throughout the 1980s and 1990s, including Hotel, Empty Nest, Murder, She Wrote and Caroline in the City. After T.J. Hooker was cancelled by ABC in 1985, he was offered the job of host of Dance Fever for its final two seasons, replacing Deney Terrio. This left him unable to return to T.J. Hooker when it was later picked up by CBS.

He has appeared as himself on VH1's I Love the '80s, Saturday Night Live and The Bozo Show. He appeared as Basil (the "floating head") on the soap opera Passions and participated in VH1's Confessions of a Teen Idol.

=== Features ===
Following the huge success of John Travolta and Olivia Newton-John in the movie version of Grease, Paramount Pictures quickly secured the rights to a sequel. Zmed was chosen to play one of the lead roles in Grease 2, Johnny Nogerelli, the new leader of the T-Birds gang. His performance led to other movie roles, including The Final Terror (1983) and Bachelor Party (1984). He appears in the film The Craving Heart (2006).

=== Return to theatre ===
Zmed returned to stage work in the 1990s. In 1990, he appeared as the title role in Jesus Christ Superstar at the Birmingham Theatre and as Seymour in Little Shop of Horrors at The Muny. He appeared as Nick Arnstein in the 1991 production of Funny Girl at the Long Beach Civic Light Opera. In 1992, he appeared Off-Broadway in the musical version of Eating Raoul as the title role. He headlined the musical Children of Eden at the Paper Mill Playhouse as Adam/Noah. He starred in three shows on Broadway: Falsettos (as Marvin), Blood Brothers (as the Narrator), and Grease (as Danny). He later appeared as Noah in the musical The Ark in New York City. Zmed played Billy Flynn in the 1999 US tour of Chicago. He played Nick in the short-lived play Surf the Musical at Planet Hollywood in Las Vegas in 2012. He returned to Grease as Teen Angel in regional productions in 2006 and 2013. From January to August 2017, he starred as Georges in a UK tour of La Cage aux Folles.

== Other work ==
Zmed provided the voiceover for Toth in the 2002 video game Star Wars Jedi Starfighter. He was also under contract from June 2008 to April 2009 with Princess Cruise Lines to perform Adrian Zmed, in Concert... aboard the Coral Princess and the Island Princess.

In 2006, he filmed a 30-second public service announcement for the non-profit organization Dogs Deserve Better.

== Personal life ==
Zmed has been married three times. He married his high school sweetheart, Barbara Fitzner, in 1976. Their two sons, Zachary and Dylan, are rock musicians who have been members of the rock band The Janks and the Bird Dogs, an Everly Brothers tribute band.

Zmed was briefly engaged to Tracee Grossman but their vast age difference led to their breakup. Soon after, Zmed married Broadway actress/singer Susan Wood in 1995; that marriage also ended in divorce.

He married Lyssa Lynne Baker on October 5, 2012. They held another (smaller) wedding in Thailand on November 23, 2012.

Zmed remains friends with his co-star and childhood television hero William Shatner. He spoke in a 2016 interview with Las Vegas Magazine about Shatner:

I learned so much just watching him...it's a very different energy on camera than onstage. Instead of reaching the last person 50 rows away from you, you're reaching someone three feet in front of you, which is really daunting...His camera technique was just incredible. He was so relaxed and all. I learned so much in term of the moment, on how you readjust your energy, how you get efficient with camera technique. And just the stories. When he directed, he would mentor me. I do consider Bill a mentor, no question about it...Oh yeah. He was very helpful in saying, "Be smart with the money that you're making during T.J. Hooker and be smart with the decisions you're making in terms of your career"...I did heed his advice on making good choices.

== Filmography ==
=== Film ===
Year	Title	Role	Notes
1982	Grease 2	Johnny Nogerelli	
1983	The Final Terror	Marco Cerone	alternate title: Campsite Massacre
1984	Bachelor Party	Jay O'Neill	
1989	Eyewitness to Murder	Tyler	
1993	The Other Woman	Greg Mathews	direct-to-video movie
1994	Improper Conduct	Doug	
1999	Unconditional Love	Mario	
2000	Running from the Shadows	Sasch	
2000	Little Insects	Sir Sneekleberry (voice)	
2002	Until Morning	Kyle	
2004	The Drone Virus	Frank Schmidt	
2005	Shira: The Vampire Samurai	Kristof	direct-to-video movie
2005	Sex Sells: The Making of Touché	Lance Long	
2006	The Craving Heart	Phil Jorgenson	
2009	Spring Break '83	Billy's father	

=== Television ===
Year	Title	Role	Notes
1978	Starsky & Hutch	Marty Decker	Episode: "Discomania"
1979	Flatbush	Socks Palermo	6 episodes
1979–80	Angie	Maxie	Episodes: "The First Separation", "The Thief", "Marie Moves Out"
1980	Goodtime Girls	Frankie Millardo	13 episodes
1980	For the Love of It	Fernando	TV movie
1981	I'm a Big Girl Now	Mechanic	Episode: "There's No Business Like Joe Business"
1981	Riker	Bobby	Episode: "Gun Run"
1981	Bosom Buddies	Joseph "Joey Midnight" Raybonz	Episode: "Best Friends"
1982–85	T. J. Hooker	Officer Vincent "Vince" Romano	72 episodes
1984	Glitter	Tom	Episode: "Pilot"
1984	Victims for Victims: The Theresa Saldana Story	Fred Feliciano	TV movie
1985–87	Dance Fever	Himself (host)	60 episodes
1986	Hotel	Bob	Episode: "Shadows of Doubt: Part 1"
1986	The Love Boat	Eddy Conrad	Episode: "Spain Cruise: Love's Labors Found" (Parts 1 & 2)
1987	Alfred Hitchcock Presents	Edgar Kraft	Episode: "When This Man Dies"
1987	You Are the Jury	Stanley Manning	Episode: "The State of Oregon vs. Stanley Manning"
1987	Hotel	Scott Osborne	Episode: "Dark Horses"
1988	Empty Nest	Gary	Episode: "Your Check Isn't in the Mail"
1989	Murder, She Wrote	Bert Firman	Episode: "From Russia...with Blood"
1994	Silk Stalkings	Calvin	Episode: "Judas Kiss"
1998	The Steve Harvey Show	Derrick Love	Episode: "White Men Can Funk"
1998	Storm Chasers: Revenge of the Twister	Smitty	TV movie
1998	Caroline in the City	Jonathan	Episode: "Caroline and the Rotten Plum"
1999	Diagnosis: Murder	Himself	Episode: "Trash TV: Part 2"
2000	Honey, I Shrunk the Kids: The TV Show	Hook	Episode: "Hook, Whodunit?"
2007	Passions	Basil	13 episodes
2007	Larry the Cable Guy's Christmas Spectacular	Dirty Caroler Dad	TV movie
2013	Outside the Box	Jack Torrence	Episode: "The Shining"
2016	Lady Dynamite	Himself	Episodes: "A Vaginismus Miracle", "Knife Feelings"
2016	Sharknado: The 4th Awakens	Himself	TV movie
2018	Mickey Mouse Mixed-Up Adventures	Randy Riff-Raff (voice)	Episode: "The Roadsterettes/Oh Happy Day"

=== Video games ===
Year	Title	Role	Notes
2002	Star Wars: Jedi Starfighter	Toth (voice)	
