= John Travolta filmography =

List of films featuring John Travolta

John Travolta is an American actor, producer, and singer.

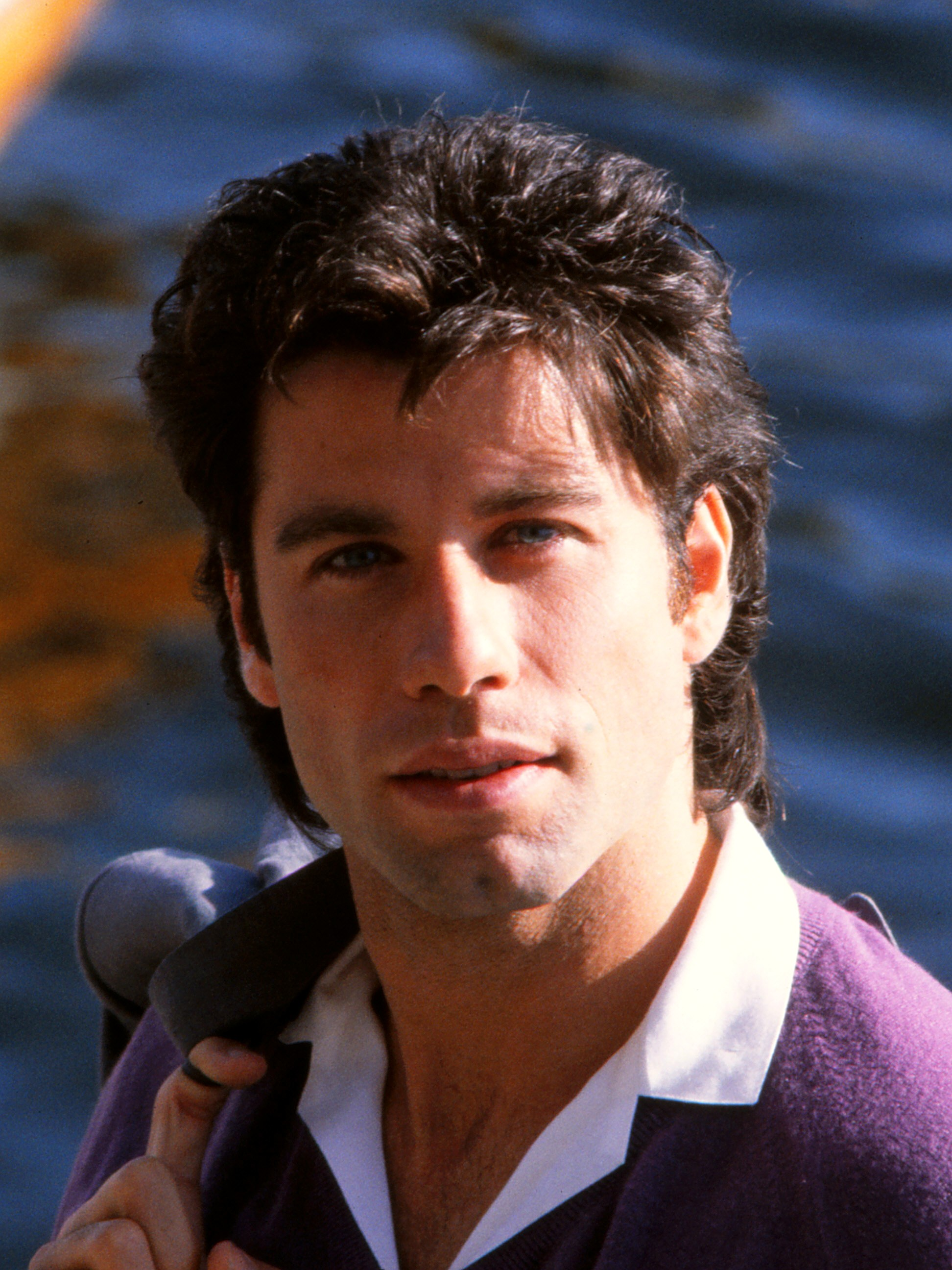
Travolta in 1983

He first became well known in the 1970s, after appearing on the television series Welcome Back, Kotter (1975–1979) and starring in the box office successes Saturday Night Fever and Grease. His acting career declined throughout the 1980s, but enjoyed a resurgence in the 1990s with his role in Pulp Fiction, and he has since starred in films such as Face/Off, Swordfish, Wild Hogs, Hairspray, and I Am Wrath.

== Filmography ==
=== Film ===
Year	Title	Role	Notes
1975	The Devil's Rain	Danny	
1976	Carrie	Billy Nolan	
1977	Saturday Night Fever	Anthony "Tony" Manero	
1978	Grease	Daniel "Danny" Zuko	
1978	Moment by Moment	Strip Harrison	
1980	Urban Cowboy	Buford "Bud" Uan Davis	
1981	Blow Out	Jack Terry	
1983	Staying Alive	Anthony "Tony" Manero	
1983	Two of a Kind	Zack Melon	
1985	Perfect	Adam Lawrence	
1989	The Experts	Travis	
1989	Look Who's Talking	James Ubriacco	
1990	Look Who's Talking Too	James Ubriacco	
1991	Shout	Jack Cabe	
1991	Eyes of an Angel	Bobby	
1993	Look Who's Talking Now	James Ubriacco	
1994	Pulp Fiction	Vincent Vega	
1995	Get Shorty	Chili Palmer	
1995	White Man's Burden	Louis Pinnock	
1996	Broken Arrow	Maj. Vic "Deak" Deakins	
1996	Phenomenon	George Malley	
1996	Michael	Michael	
1997	Off the Menu: The Last Days of Chasen's	Himself	Documentary film
1997	Face/Off	Sean Archer / Castor Troy	
1997	She's So Lovely	Joey Giamonti	Also executive producer
1997	Mad City	Sam Baily	
1998	Primary Colors	Governor Jack Stanton	
1998	Junket Whore	Himself	Documentary film
1998	The Thin Red Line	Brigadier General Quintard	
1998	A Civil Action	Jan Schlichtmann	
1999	The General's Daughter	Warr. Officer Paul Brenner	
1999	Our Friend, Martin	Mr. Langon	Voice; Direct-to-video
2000	Battlefield Earth	Terl	Also producer
2000	Lucky Numbers	Russ Richards	
2000	Welcome to Hollywood	Himself	Cameo; Mockumentary
2001	Swordfish	Gabriel Shear	
2001	Domestic Disturbance	Frank Morrison	
2002	Austin Powers in Goldmember	Himself as "Austinpussy" Goldmember	Cameo
2003	Basic	Tom Hardy	
2004	Ladder 49	Captain Mike Kennedy	
2004	A Love Song for Bobby Long	Bobby Long	
2004	The Punisher	Howard Saint	
2005	Magnificent Desolation: Walking on the Moon 3D	James Benson "Jim" Irwin	Voice; Documentary film
2005	Be Cool	Chili Palmer	
2006	Lonely Hearts	Elmer C. Robinson	
2007	Wild Hogs	Woody Stevens	
2007	Hairspray	Edna Turnblad	
2008	Bolt	Bolt	Voice
2009	The Taking of Pelham 123	Dennis "Ryder" Ford	
2009	Old Dogs	Charlie Reed	
2010	Quantum Quest: A Cassini Space Odyssey	Dave	Voice
2010	From Paris with Love	Charlie Wax	
2012	Savages	Dennis Cain	
2012	Casting By	Himself	Documentary film
2013	Killing Season	Emil Kovac	
2014	The Forger	Ray Cutter	
2015	Life on the Line	Beau Ginner	Direct-to-video
2015	Criminal Activities	Eddie	Also executive producer
2016	In a Valley of Violence	Marshal Clyde Martin	
2016	I Am Wrath	Stanley Hill	Direct-to-video
2018	Gotti	John Gotti	Also executive producer
2018	Speed Kills	Ben Aronoff	Direct-to-video
2019	Trading Paint	Sam Munroe	Direct-to-video
2019	The Poison Rose	Carson Phillips	Direct-to-video
2019	The Fanatic	Moose	
2022	Paradise City	Arlene Buckley	Direct-to-video
2023	Mob Land	Bodie Davis	Direct-to-video
2023	The Shepherd	Johnny Kavanagh	Short film
2024	Cash Out	Mason Goddard	Direct-to-video
2025	High Rollers	Mason Goddard	Direct-to-video
2026	Propeller One-Way Night Coach	Older Jeff/Narrator	Also director, writer, and producer
2026	The Gentleman Thief	Mason Goddard	Direct-to-video
2026	November 1963 †	John Roselli	
TBA	That's Amore! †	Nick Venere	
TBA	Black Tides †	Bill Pierce	Filming

Key
†	Denotes films that have not yet been released

=== Television ===
Year	Title	Role	Notes
1972	Emergency!	Chuck Benson	Episode: "Kids"
1972	Owen Marshall, Counselor at Law		Episode: "A Piece of God"
1973	The Rookies	Eddie Halley	Episode: " Frozen Smoke"
1974	Medical Center	Danny	Episode: "Saturday's Child"
1975	The Tenth Level	John	Television film
1975–1979	Welcome Back, Kotter	Vincent "Vinnie" Barbarino	79 episodes
1976	Mr. T and Tina	Vinnie Barbarino	Episode: "Pilot"
1976	The Boy in the Plastic Bubble	Tod Lubitch	Television film
1987	Basements: The Dumb Waiter	Ben	Television film
1987	The Grand Knockout Tournament	Himself	Participant; Television special
1991	Chains of Gold	Scott Barnes	Television film; also writer
1992	Boris and Natasha: The Movie	Himself	Cameo; Television film
1994	Saturday Night Live	Himself	Host; Episode: "John Travolta/Seal"
2005	Fat Actress	Himself	Episode: "Big Butts"
2014	Kirstie	Mickey	Episode: "Mickey & Maddie"
2016	The People v. O. J. Simpson: American Crime Story	Robert Shapiro	10 episodes; also producer
2020	Die Hart	Ron Wilcox	10 episodes
2024	Sanremo Music Festival 2024	Himself	Guest; Annual music festival

=== Music videos ===
Year	Title	Artist(s)	Role	Notes	Ref.
1989	"Liberian Girl"	Michael Jackson	—N/a		
2019	"3 to Tango"	Pitbull	—N/a		
2024	"Little Bird"	Ella Bleu	Himself	Archive footage	

=== Commercials ===
Year	Title	Role	Notes
2020	Capital One	Santa Claus	
2023	Capital One	Santa Claus	
2025	Capital One	Santa Claus	

== Discography ==
=== Albums ===
Year	Album	US
1974	Over Here! (musical)	—
1976	John Travolta	39
1977	Can't Let You Go	66
1978	Travolta Fever	161
1978	Grease (soundtrack)	1
1983	Two of a Kind (soundtrack)	26
1986	The Road to Freedom (collaboration)	—
1996	Let Her In: The Best of John Travolta	—
2003	The Collection	—
2007	Hairspray (soundtrack)	—
2012	This Christmas (with Olivia Newton-John)	81

=== Singles ===
Year	Title	US Billboard	US Cash Box	US Record World	US AC	CAN	CAN AC	UK
1974	"Dream Drummin'"							
1975	"Easy Evil"							
1975	"Can't Let You Go"							
1976	"You Set My Dreams to Music"							
1976	"Goodnight Mr. Moon"							
1976	"Rainbows"							
1976	"Settle Down"							
1976	"Moonlight Lady"							
1976	"Right Time of the Night"							
1976	"Big Trouble"							
1976	"What Would They Say"							
1976	"Back Doors Crying"							
1976	"Let Her In"	10	5		16	7	12	
1976	"Whenever I'm Away from You"	38	62			61		
1976	"Slow Dancin'"							
1976	"It Had to Be You"							
1976	"I Don't Know What I Like About You Baby"							
1977	"All Strung Out on You"	34	28			30		
1977	"Baby, I Could Be So Good at Lovin' You"							
1977	"Razzamatazz"							
1978	"You're the One That I Want" (with Olivia Newton-John)	1	3			2		1
1978	"Summer Nights" (with Olivia Newton-John)	5	3			3		1
1978	"Sandy"	—	—	—	—		—	2
1978	"Greased Lightnin'"	47	45					11
1980	"Never Gonna Fall in Love Again"				—	—	—	—
1983	"Take a Chance" (with Olivia Newton-John)			—	3	—	1	—
1997	"Two Sleepy People" (with Carly Simon)			—		—	—	—
2008	"I Thought I Lost You" (with Miley Cyrus)			—				

== See also ==
- List of oldest and youngest Academy Award winners and nominees – Youngest Nominees for Best Actor
