= The Carol Douglas Album =

Studio album by Carol Douglas
- Released: 1975
- Genres: Soul, Disco
- Length: 32:25
- Label: Midland International Records
- Producer: Ed O'Loughlin

Carol Douglas chronology
The Carol Douglas Album (1975)	Midnight Love Affair (1976)

The Carol Douglas Album is the debut studio album by American singer Carol Douglas, released in 1975 by Midland International Records and distributed by RCA Records. The album was released following the success of Douglas's 1974 single "Doctor's Orders", which became a major hit in the United States and internationally.

== Critical reception ==
Upon release, Record World described the album as likely to benefit from the momentum of "Doctor's Orders", while Cashbox praised Douglas's vocal range and the record's combination of R&B characteristics, string arrangements, drum syncopation and guitar.

== Track listing ==
No.	Title	Length
1.	"Doctor's Orders"	4:30
2.	"A Friend in Need"	4:08
3.	"Baby, Don't Let This Good Love Die"	3:24
4.	"Take Me (Make Me Lose Control)"	3:42
5.	"A Hurricane Is Coming Tonite"	4:01
6.	"I Fell in Love With Love"	2:53
7.	"All Night Long"	3:34
8.	"Will We Make It Tonight"	3:35
9.	"Boy, You Know Just What I'm After"	2:38
Total length:		32:25

== Charts ==
Chart (1975)	Peak position
Swedish Albums (Sverigetopplistan)	49
US Billboard 200	177
US Billboard Top Soul LPs	37
