= Carol Douglas =

American singer

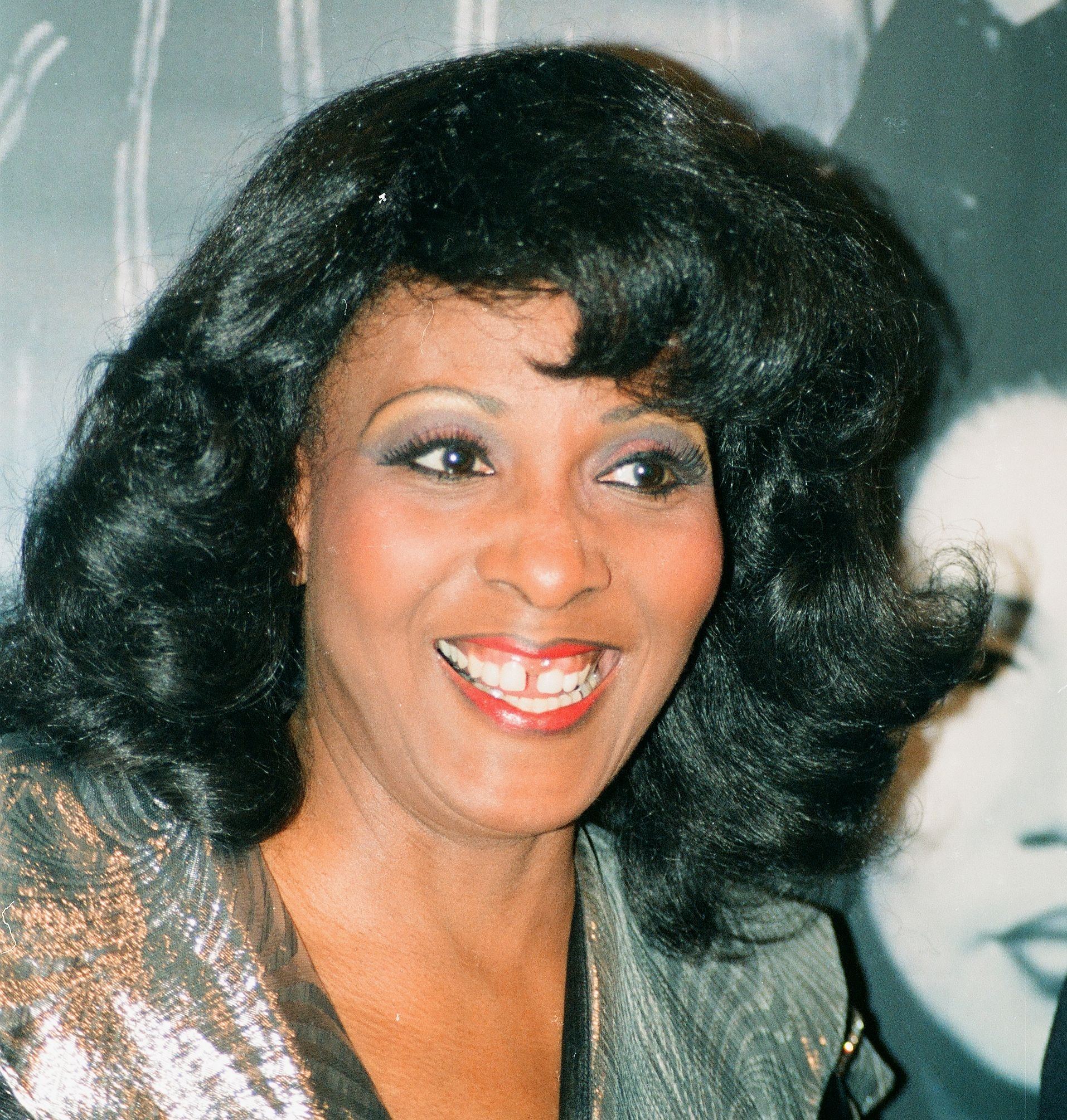
- Douglas in 1996

Background information
- Born: Carolyn Strickland; April 7, 1948 (age 78); Bedford–Stuyvesant, Brooklyn, New York, U.S.
- Genres: R&B, soul, disco
- Occupations: Singer, actress
- Years active: 1970s–present
- Labels: Midland Int'l, Midsong Int'l, Next Plateau

Carol Douglas (born April 7, 1948) is an American singer whose hit "Doctor's Orders" (1974) was a pioneering track in the disco genre.

== Early life and acting career ==
Carol Douglas was born in Bedford–Stuyvesant, Brooklyn, New York City, United States. She is the daughter of Minnie Newsome, a jazz performer who has been cited as the inspiration for the Cab Calloway classic "Minnie the Moocher"; her father was a mortician. Sam Cooke was her cousin. At 10, Douglas was a contestant and winner on the game show Name That Tune and says "Ebony followed my career for the next three years."

She attended the Willard May School for professional children and afterwards the Quintanos High School for young professionals alongside Gregory Hines, Bernadette Peters, Carol Lynley, and Patty Duke. While in high school Douglas sang in a female trio named April May & June, who were signed as a management client by Little Anthony and the Imperials. She made a one-off recording in 1965 for RCA Victor, cutting the single "I Don't Mind (Being Your Fool)" under the name Carolyn Cooke: becoming pregnant with her first son at age 15 ended RCA's interest in promoting her.

Douglas also cut several jingles for TV commercials – "[I] used to do voiceovers for Ideal Toys and General Mills with Bernadette Peters" – but recalls: "I never thought I would be a singer," and for most of the 1960s Douglas pursued an acting career, appearing in an episode of The Patty Duke Show but mostly acting in theatrical productions beginning with One Tuesday Morning starring Clarice Taylor. Later Douglas understudied Jonelle Allen in the off-Broadway production of The Life of Mary McLeod Bethune and co-starred with James Earl Jones and Cicely Tyson in the play Moon on a Rainbow Shawl.

She married "high school sweetheart" Ken Douglas in the mid-1960s and resumed her musical career in the early 1970s, touring nationally on the oldies circuit in a line-up of the Chantels, featuring original frontwoman Arlene Smith: with these Chantels, Douglas cut the single "Some Tears Fall Dry" for Capitol.

== Music career ==
In 1974, Douglas was recruited by Midland International Records via an ad in Showbiz magazine: label vice president/record producer Eddie O'Loughlin had heard the UK hit single "Doctor's Orders" by Sunny and was seeking a female vocalist to cut the track for the U.S. market. Douglas's audition led to a five-year contract and her version of "Doctor's Orders" became a hit, reaching No. 2 on the Billboard disco chart, No. 9 R&B, and No. 11 on the Hot 100; the single also reached No. 4 in France.

Although O'Loughlin was credited as "Doctor's Orders" producer, the production had been by Meco Monardo, who was also responsible for Gloria Gaynor's "Never Can Say Goodbye" which had ascended the pop chart at around the same time as "Doctor's Orders"; claims have been made for each single to be the hit that broke disco into the top 40. She made her album debut in 1975 with The Carol Douglas Album, followed in 1976 by Midnight Love Affair and in 1977 by Full Bloom. Monardo's special expertise was missing in the production of her post-"Doctor's Orders" tracks which maintained her as a popular club presence with negligible mainstream popularity; the follow-up single to "Doctor's Orders", "A Hurricane Is Coming Tonite", became her only other Hot 100 entry, peaking at No. 81 in April 1975. Douglas hit No. 1 on the disco chart with "Midnight Love Affair"; the song did appear on the top 100 chart in Cash Box magazine, but only via a cover by Tony Orlando and Dawn, which reached No. 94. (In France, Douglas's version reached No. 82.)

Douglas's other recordings included "Headline News", written by "Doctor's Orders" co-writer Roger Greenaway and remade by the latter track's originator Sunny – and in the tradition of "Doctor's Orders" Douglas cut discofied covers of several songs which were current or recent hits in the UK including ABBA's "Dancing Queen", "I Wanna Stay with You" by Gallagher and Lyle, and "So You Win Again" by Hot Chocolate. In 1977 she recorded the single "You Make Me Feel the Music" for the soundtrack to the film Haunted.

"So You Win Again" was arranged by Michael Zager whose presence on her 1978 album release Burnin' resulted in a critical (if not commercial) upswing. Burnin' also featured Douglas's version of the Bee Gees' "Night Fever" – not a Zager arrangement – which became Douglas's only entry in the UK Singles Chart at #66.

Douglas's 1979 album Come into My Life was an obvious bid to recharge her club popularity; it was only six tracks long with production by Greg Carmichael who had enjoyed several disco hits with studio groups, but the single "I Got the Answer" was a mild club success. Although she did not appear in the disco-themed movie Saturday Night Fever, she was enough of a disco star that her name appears on the marquee of the disco featured in the movie. (A snippet of "Midnight Love Affair" can be heard playing when Tony Manero, played by John Travolta and his friends are at the club).

In 1981, her cover of the Three Degrees' "My Simple Heart" was released on 20th Century Records as by then the Midland International (aka Midsong) was defunct. "My Simple Heart" was also her debut on Carrere Records based in Paris where she lived for a time: in the early 1980s Carrère handled her European releases while in the US she was signed to O'Loughlin's Next Plateau label. Her last album to date 'I Got Your Body', renamed 'Love Zone' in the US and Canada, was released in 1983 and included her last four 12" singles from 1981 to 1983: "My Simple Heart", "You're Not So Hot", "I Got Your Body", and "Got Ya Where I Want Ya"; "You're Not So Hot" reached #71 in France (1982).

== Career resurgence ==
The retro-boom of the 1990s put Douglas back on the road touring and making personal appearances at a number of special events including the Martin Luther King Concert Series, Beatstock '97, Saturday Night Fever 20th Anniversary Reunion, and the Dance Music Hall of Fame ceremony. In 2003, she returned to the recording studio when she was invited to sing backing vocals on Wanda Dee's Goddess Is Here! CD. During this period, she also re-recorded a number of her hits.

Douglas is not to be confused with (and is not related to) Carl Douglas, a fellow pop one-hit wonder whose famous No. 1 single, "Kung Fu Fighting", was in the Billboard Hot 100 at about the same time as "Doctor's Orders".

== The People's Court ==
Douglas made an appearance on The People's Court (with Judge Marilyn Milian) in 2003 as the plaintiff in a case involving herself and fellow disco diva Sharon Brown. After the ruling, Brown stated that Douglas's decision to take her to court was a publicity stunt, to get some free TV air time. In addition to awarding Douglas some (not all) of the money she was requesting, Milian had Douglas sing a brief snippet of "Doctor's Orders", as well as having Brown sing a snippet of her 1982 song "I Specialize in Love".

== Discography ==
=== Studio albums ===
Year	Title	Peak chart positions				Record label
Year	Title	US	US R&B	AUS	SWE	Record label
1975	The Carol Douglas Album	177	37	—	49	Midland Int'l
1976	Midnight Love Affair	188	—	71	—	Midland Int'l
1977	Full Bloom	139	—	99	—	Midsong Int'l
1978	Burnin'	—	—	—	—	Midsong Int'l
1979	Come into My Life	—	—	—	—	Midsong Int'l
1983	Love Zone	—	—	—	—	Next Plateau
"—" denotes a recording that did not chart or was not released in that territory.

=== Compilation albums ===
- The Best of Carol Douglas (1980, Midsong Int'l)
- Satin and Smoke: The Best of Carol Douglas (1981, Stack-O-Hits)
- Greatest Hits (1989, Unidisc)
- Doctor's Orders: The Best of Carol Douglas (1995, Hot Productions)
- Disco Queen - Carol Douglas: Greatest Hits (1999, Classic World Productions)
- Hits Anthology (2011, Essential Media Group)

=== Singles ===
Year	Single	Peak chart positions									Album
Year	Single	US	US R&B	US Dan	AUS	BEL	CAN	GER	NZ	UK	Album
1974	"Doctor's Orders"	11	9	2	31	10	1	37	6	—	The Carol Douglas Album
1975	"A Hurricane Is Coming Tonite"	81	—	—	—	—	79	—	—	—	The Carol Douglas Album
1975	"Will We Make It Tonight"	—	—	—	—	—	—	—	—	—	The Carol Douglas Album
1975	"Headline News"	—	—	—	—	—	—	—	—	—	Midnight Love Affair
1976	"Midnight Love Affair"	102	—	1	—	—	93	—	—	—	Midnight Love Affair
1976	"Crime Don't Pay"	—	—	1	—	—	—	—	—	—	Midnight Love Affair
1977	"Dancing Queen"	110	—	35	—	—	—	—	—	—	Full Bloom
1977	"I Want to Stay with You"	—	—	28	—	—	—	—	—	—	Full Bloom
1977	"Light My Fire"	—	—	28	—	—	—	—	—	—	Full Bloom
1977	"We Do It"	108	—	—	—	—	—	—	—	—	Full Bloom
1978	"Night Fever"	106	—	15	—	—	—	—	—	66	Burnin'
1978	"So You Win Again"	—	—	—	—	—	—	—	—	—	Burnin'
1978	"Burnin'"	—	—	11	—	—	—	—	—	—	Burnin'
1979	"I Got the Answer"	—	—	51	—	—	—	—	—	—	Come into My Life
1979	"Love Sick"	—	—	51	—	—	—	—	—	—	Come into My Life
1981	"My Simple Heart"	—	—	42	—	—	—	—	—	—	Love Zone
"—" denotes a recording that did not chart or was not released in that territory.

== See also ==
- List of Billboard number-one dance club songs
- List of artists who reached number one on the U.S. Dance Club Songs chart
