= Midnight Love Affair =

Single by Carol Douglas

from the album Midnight Love Affair
- B-side: "Midnight Love Affair" (Long version)
- Released: 1976
- Recorded: 1976
- Studio: Sigma Sound, Philadelphia, Pennsylvania
- Genre: Disco
- Length: 3:55 (7" version); 6:20 (Album version)
- Label: Midland International
- Songwriters: Estelle Levitt, Pierre Groscolas, Michel Jourdan
- Producer: Eddie O'Loughlin

Carol Douglas singles chronology
"A Hurricane Is Coming Tonite" (1975)	"Midnight Love Affair" (1976)	"Dancing Queen" (1977)

"Midnight Love Affair" is a 1976 song by Carol Douglas from the album of the same name, originally released as a single in 1975 by Tony Orlando and Dawn. Along with the track "Crime Don't Pay", the song went to number one for one week on the Billboard disco/dance chart. The single failed to chart on either the Billboard Hot 100 or the R&B chart.

"Midnight Love Affair" was written in French by Pierre Groscolas and Michel Jourdan ("Ma jeunesse au fond de l'eau"), adapted in English by Estelle Levitt and produced by Eddie O'Loughlin.
