= Midland International =

Midland International can refer to:

- Midland International Airport, an airport in Texas
- Midland International Records, a record label

== See also ==
- British Midland International (BMI), an airline
