= Travolta Fever =

Compilation album by John Travolta
- Released: 1978
- Genre: Pop
- Label: Midsong International Records
- Producer: Bob Reno

John Travolta chronology
Can't Let You Go (1977)	Travolta Fever (1978)	Grease (1978)

Travolta Fever is a 1978 compilation album featuring songs by John Travolta and was released on the Midsong International label. This 2-record set reached No. 161 on the U.S. albums chart in the same year that the soundtrack for Grease reached No. 1.

== Track listing ==
Side 1

1. "Let Her In"
2. "Never Gonna Fall in Love Again"
3. "Rainbows"
4. "A Girl Like You"
5. "Razzamatazz"

Side 2

1. "I Don't Know What I Like About You Baby"
2. "Baby, I Could Be So Good At Lovin' You"
3. "Big Trouble"
4. "It Had to Be You"
5. "Good Night, Mr. Moon"

Side 3

1. "Slow Dancing"
2. "You Set My Dreams To Music"
3. "Whenever I'm Away from You"
4. "Settle Down"
5. "Back Doors Crying"

Side 4

1. "Moonlight Lady"
2. "All Strung Out On You"
3. "Can't Let You Go"
4. "Easy Evil"
5. "What Would They Say"
6. "Right Time of the Night"

== Album charts ==
Chart performance for Travolta Fever
Chart	Peak position
US Billboard 200	161
