= List of awards and nominations received by John Travolta =

John Travolta awards and nominations
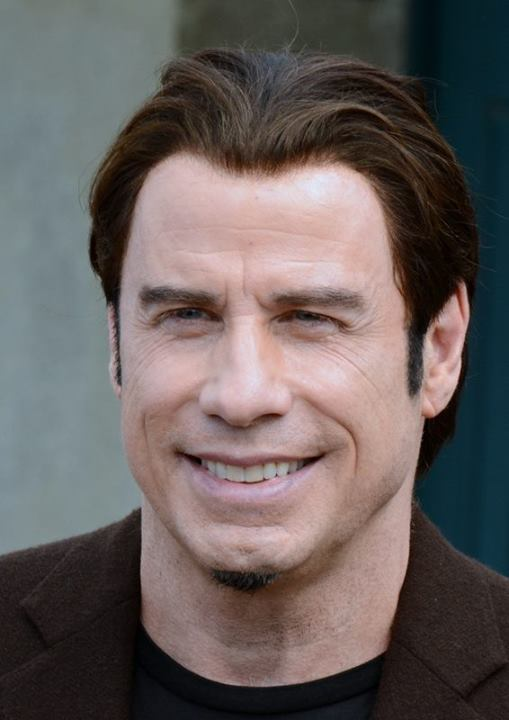
- Travolta at the 2013 Deauville American Film Festival
Awards and nominations
Award	Wins	Nominations
Academy Awards	0	2
British Academy Film Awards	0	1
Golden Globe Awards	3	9
Grammy Awards	0	1
Primetime Emmy Awards	1	3
Screen Actors Guild Awards	0	3

Totals (Note: Certain award groups do not simply award one winner. They acknowledge several different recipients, have runners-up, and have third place. Since this is a specific recognition and is different from losing an award, runner-up mentions are considered wins in this award tally. For simplification and to avoid errors, each award in this list has been presumed to have had a prior nomination.)
- Wins: 44
- Nominations: 90

This article is a list of awards and nominations received by John Travolta.

John Travolta is an American actor who is known for his roles in film and television. Over his career he has received three Golden Globe Awards and a Primetime Emmy Award as well as nominations for two Academy Awards, a BAFTA Award, a Critics' Choice Award, a Grammy Award, and three Screen Actors Guild Awards. He received the Cannes Film Festival's Honorary Palme d'Or in 2026.

Travolta had a career breakthrough playing young Italian-American Tony Manero living in Brooklyn in Saturday Night Fever (1977), receiving his first nomination for the Academy Award for Best Actor. The following year, he had another successful film thanks to the role of Danny Zuko in the 1978 musical Grease, earning nominations for a Golden Globe Award and the Grammy Award for Album of the Year for the film's accompanying soundtrack.

After a career downturn in the early 1990s decade, Travolta made a comeback when he played against type as Vincent Vega in Quentin Tarantino's hit Pulp Fiction (1994), for which he received nominations for his second Academy Award, a BAFTA Award and a Screen Actors Guild Award. He won his first Golden Globe Award for Best Actor for the 1995 gangster comedy film Get Shorty and returned to the musical genre with the 2007 remake of Hairspray, winning the Critics' Choice Movie Award for Best Acting Ensemble.

Travolta portrayed lawyer Robert Shapiro in the television series The People v. O. J. Simpson: American Crime Story (2016), receiving nominations for the Golden Globe Award and the Primetime Emmy Award for Outstanding Supporting Actor in a Limited Series, while also winning the Primetime Emmy Award for Outstanding Limited Series as an executive producer of the show.

== Major associations ==
=== Academy Awards ===
Year	Category	Nominated work	Result	Ref.
1977	Best Actor	Saturday Night Fever	Nominated	
1994	Best Actor	Pulp Fiction	Nominated	

=== Actor Awards ===
Year	Category	Nominated work	Result	Ref.
1994	Outstanding Actor in a Leading Role	Pulp Fiction	Nominated	
1995	Outstanding Cast in a Motion Picture (Note: Shared with the cast.)	Get Shorty	Nominated	
2007	Outstanding Cast in a Motion Picture	Hairspray	Nominated	

=== BAFTA Awards ===
Year	Category	Nominated work	Result	Ref.
British Academy Film Awards
1994	Best Actor in a Leading Role	Pulp Fiction	Nominated	
Britannia Awards
1998	Excellence in Film	—N/a	Honored	

=== Critics' Choice Awards ===
Year	Category	Nominated work	Result	Ref.
Critics' Choice Movie Awards
2007	Best Acting Ensemble	Hairspray	Won	
Critics' Choice Television Awards
2016	Best Supporting Actor in a Movie/Miniseries	The People v. O. J. Simpson: American Crime Story	Nominated	

=== Emmy Awards ===
Year	Category	Nominated work	Result	Ref.
Primetime Emmy Awards
2016	Outstanding Limited Series (Note: As a producer.)	The People v. O. J. Simpson: American Crime Story	Won	
2016	Outstanding Supporting Actor in a Limited Series or Movie	The People v. O. J. Simpson: American Crime Story	Nominated	
2021	Outstanding Actor in a Short Form Series	Die Hart	Nominated	

=== Golden Globes ===
Year	Category	Nominated work	Result	Ref.
1977	Best Actor in a Motion Picture – Musical or Comedy	Saturday Night Fever	Nominated	
1978	Best Actor in a Motion Picture – Musical or Comedy	Grease	Nominated	
1978	World Film Favorites – Male	—N/a	Won	
1994	Best Actor in a Motion Picture – Drama	Pulp Fiction	Nominated	
1995	Best Actor in a Motion Picture – Musical or Comedy	Get Shorty	Won	
1998	Best Actor in a Motion Picture – Musical or Comedy	Primary Colors	Nominated	
2007	Best Supporting Actor – Motion Picture	Hairspray	Nominated	
2016	Best Limited or Anthology Series or Television Film	The People v. O. J. Simpson: American Crime Story	Won	
2016	Best Supporting Actor – Television	The People v. O. J. Simpson: American Crime Story	Nominated	

=== Grammy Awards ===
Year	Category	Nominated work	Result	Ref.
1979	Album of the Year (Note: As a featured artist.)	Grease: The Original Motion Picture Soundtrack	Nominated	

== Miscellaneous associations ==
Organizations	Year	Category	Work	Result	Ref.
AARP Movies for Grownups Awards	2008	Best Grownup Love Story (shared with Christopher Walken)	Hairspray	Won	
AARP Movies for Grownups Awards	2010	Best Supporting Actor	The Taking of Pelham 123	Nominated	
American Comedy Awards	1995	Funniest Actor in a Motion Picture – Leading Role	Pulp Fiction	Nominated	
American Comedy Awards	1996	Funniest Actor in a Motion Picture – Leading Role	Get Shorty	Won	
Black Reel Awards	2017	Outstanding Television Movie or Limited Series	The People v. O. J. Simpson: American Crime Story	Won	
Blockbuster Entertainment Awards	1997	Favorite Actor – Drama	Phenomenon	Won	
Blockbuster Entertainment Awards	1998	Favorite Actor – Action/Adventure	Face/Off	Nominated	
Blockbuster Entertainment Awards	1999	Favorite Actor – Drama	A Civil Action	Nominated	
Blockbuster Entertainment Awards	1999	World Artist Award	—N/a	Honored	
Blockbuster Entertainment Awards	2000	Favorite Actor – Suspense	The General's Daughter	Nominated	
David di Donatello Awards	1995	Best Foreign Actor	Pulp Fiction	Won	
Golden Apple Awards	1978	Male Star of the Year	—N/a	Won	
Golden Apple Awards	1998	Male Star of the Year	—N/a	Won	
Golden Camera Awards	2011	Best International Actor	—N/a	Won	
Golden Raspberry Awards	1984	Worst Actor	Staying Alive / Two of a Kind	Nominated	
Golden Raspberry Awards	1986	Worst Actor	Perfect	Nominated	
Golden Raspberry Awards	1990	Worst Actor of the Decade	The Experts / Perfect / Staying Alive / Two of a Kind	Nominated	
Golden Raspberry Awards	1992	Worst Supporting Actor	Shout	Nominated	
Golden Raspberry Awards	2001	Worst Actor	Battlefield Earth and Lucky Numbers	Won	
Golden Raspberry Awards	2001	Worst Screen Couple (Note: Credited as "John Travolta and anyone sharing the screen with him".)	Battlefield Earth	Won	
Golden Raspberry Awards	2002	Worst Actor	Domestic Disturbance / Swordfish	Nominated	
Golden Raspberry Awards	2010	Worst Actor	Old Dogs	Nominated	
Golden Raspberry Awards	2010	Worst Actor of the Decade	Battlefield Earth / Domestic Disturbance; Lucky Numbers / Old Dogs / Swordfish	Nominated	
Golden Raspberry Awards	2019	Worst Actor	Gotti	Nominated	
Golden Raspberry Awards	2019	Worst Screen Combo (shared with Kelly Preston)	Gotti	Nominated	
Golden Raspberry Awards	2020	Worst Actor	The Fanatic and Trading Paint	Won	
Golden Raspberry Awards	2020	Worst Screen Combo (Note: Credited as "John Travolta and any screenplay he accepts".)	—N/a	Nominated	
Hasty Pudding Theatricals Awards	1981	Man of the Year	—N/a	Won	
Hollywood Film Awards	2004	Lifetime Achievement Award	—N/a	Honored	
Hollywood Film Awards	2007	Supporting Actor of the Year	Hairspray	Won	
Hollywood Film Awards	2007	Ensemble of the Year	Hairspray	Won	
MTV Movie & TV Awards	1995	Best Male Performance	Pulp Fiction	Nominated	
MTV Movie & TV Awards	1995	Best On-Screen Duo (shared with Samuel L. Jackson)	Pulp Fiction	Nominated	
MTV Movie & TV Awards	1995	Best Dance Sequence (shared with Uma Thurman)	Pulp Fiction	Won	
MTV Movie & TV Awards	1996	Best Villain	Broken Arrow	Nominated	
MTV Movie & TV Awards	1996	Best Fight (shared with Christian Slater)	Broken Arrow	Nominated	
MTV Movie & TV Awards	1997	Best Male Performance	Phenomenon	Nominated	
MTV Movie & TV Awards	1997	Best Kiss (shared with Kyra Sedgwick)	Phenomenon	Nominated	
MTV Movie & TV Awards	1998	Best Male Performance	Face/Off	Nominated	
MTV Movie & TV Awards	1998	Best Villain (shared with Nicolas Cage)	Face/Off	Nominated	
MTV Movie & TV Awards	1998	Best On-Screen Duo (shared with Nicolas Cage)	Face/Off	Won	
Palm Springs International Film Festival	2008	Ensemble Cast Award	Hairspray	Won	
Producers Guild of America Awards	2017	Outstanding Producer of Long-Form Television	The People v. O. J. Simpson: American Crime Story	Won	
Satellite Awards	1999	Best Cast – Motion Picture	The Thin Red Line	Won	
Saturn Awards	1999	Best Actor	Face/Off	Nominated	
ShoWest Awards	1996	Male Star of the Year	—N/a	Won	
Stinkers Bad Movie Awards	1978	Worst Actor	Moment by Moment	Nominated	
Stinkers Bad Movie Awards	1978	Worst On-Screen Couple (shared with Lily Tomlin)	Moment by Moment	Won	
Stinkers Bad Movie Awards	1997	Worst Actor	Mad City	Nominated	
Stinkers Bad Movie Awards	2000	Worst Actor	Battlefield Earth	Won	
Stinkers Bad Movie Awards	2000	Worst On-Screen Couple (Note: Credited as "John Travolta and anyone in the entire galaxy!".)	Battlefield Earth	Won	
Stinkers Bad Movie Awards	2000	Worst On-Screen Hairstyle (shared with Forest Whitaker)	Battlefield Earth	Won	
Stinkers Bad Movie Awards	2003	Most Annoying Fake Accent (Male)	Basic	Nominated	
Stockholm International Film Festival	1994	Best Actor	Pulp Fiction	Won	

== Critics associations ==
Year	Association	Category	Nominated work	Result	Ref.
1977	National Board of Review	Best Actor	Saturday Night Fever	Won	
1977	National Society of Film Critics	Best Actor	Saturday Night Fever	Nominated	
1977	New York Film Critics Circle	Best Actor	Saturday Night Fever	Nominated	
1994	Los Angeles Film Critics Association	Best Actor	Pulp Fiction	Won	
1995	London Film Critics' Circle	Actor of the Year	Pulp Fiction	Won	
1995	National Society of Film Critics	Best Actor	Pulp Fiction	Nominated	
1995	New York Film Critics Circle	Best Actor	Get Shorty	Nominated	

== Honorary awards ==
Organizations	Year	Notes	Result	Ref.
Chicago International Film Festival	1998	Lifetime Achievement Award	Honored	
Palm Springs International Film Festival	1999	Desert Palm Achievement Award	Honored	
Santa Barbara International Film Festival	2008	Kirk Douglas Award for Excellence in Film	Honored	
San Sebastián International Film Festival	2012	Donostia Award	Honored	
Zurich Film Festival	2012	Golden Eye for Lifetime Achievement	Honored	
Karlovy Vary International Film Festival	2013	Crystal Globe for Outstanding Artistic Contribution to World Cinema	Honored	
International Indian Film Academy Awards	2014	Outstanding Achievement in International Cinema	Honored	
Cannes Film Festival	2026	Honorary Palme d'Or	Honored	
