= John Travolta =

American actor (born 1954)

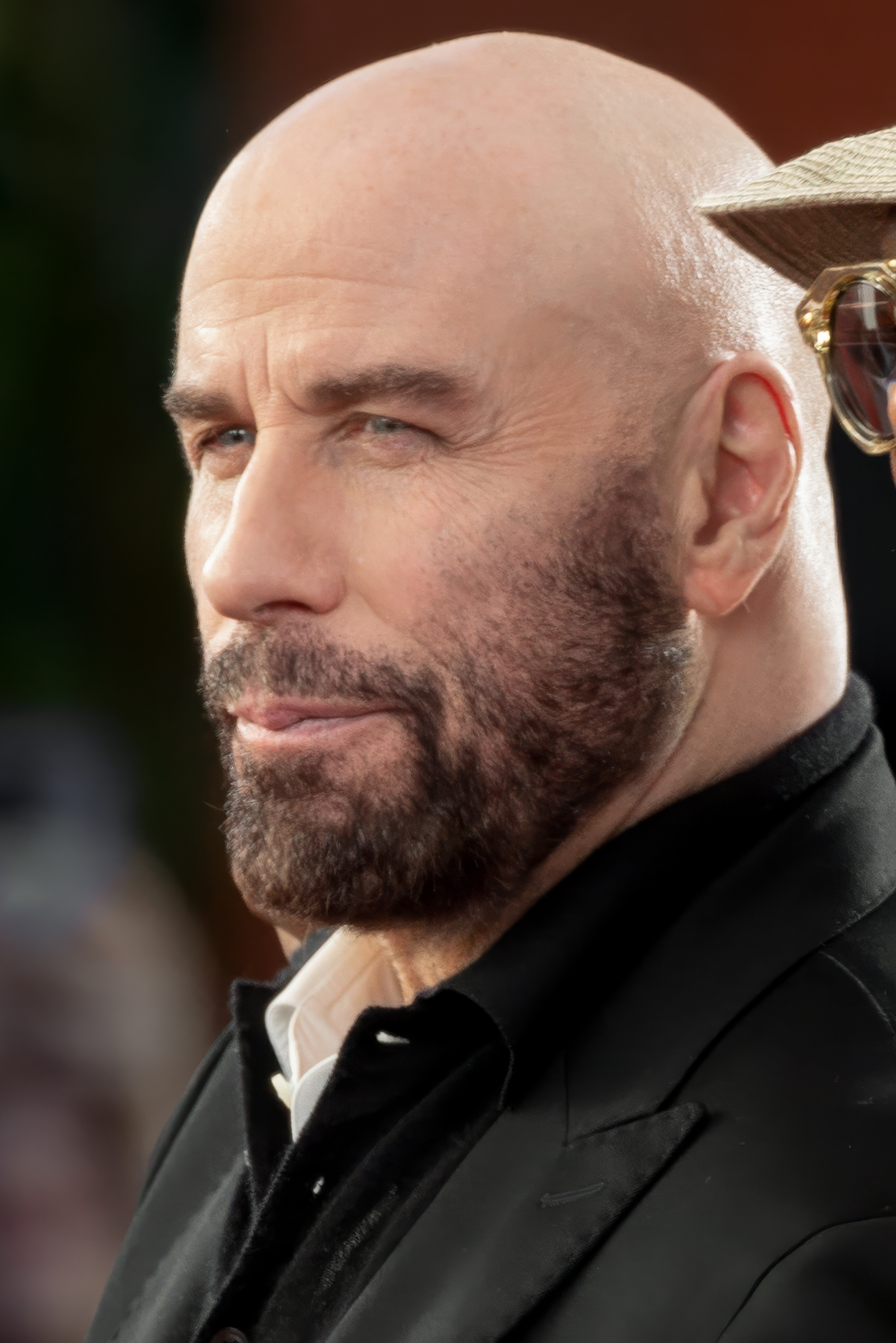
- Travolta in 2024
- Born: John Joseph Travolta; February 18, 1954 (age 72); Englewood, New Jersey, U.S.
- Occupations: Actor; singer; producer
- Years active: 1972–present
- Works: Filmography
- Spouse: Kelly Preston (m. 1991; died 2020)
- Children: 3
- Relatives: Ellen Travolta (sister); Margaret Travolta (sister); Joey Travolta (brother)
- Awards: Full list
- Website: travolta.com

John Joseph Travolta (born February 18, 1954) is an American actor. He began acting in television before transitioning into a leading man in films. His accolades include a Primetime Emmy Award, three Golden Globes and an Honorary Palme d'Or, in addition to nominations for two Academy Awards, a British Academy Film Award, and three Actor Awards.

Travolta came to prominence starring in the sitcom Welcome Back, Kotter (1975–1979), followed by a supporting performance in Carrie (1976) and then leading roles in Grease (1978), Urban Cowboy (1980), and Blow Out (1981). He earned nominations for the Academy Award for Best Actor for his roles in Saturday Night Fever (1977) and Pulp Fiction (1994). His other notable films include Get Shorty (1995), Broken Arrow (1996), Michael (1996), Face/Off (1997), A Civil Action (1998), Primary Colors (1998), The General's Daughter (1999), The Punisher (2004), Wild Hogs (2007), Hairspray (2007), Bolt (2008), and Savages (2012).

Travolta returned to television portraying lawyer Robert Shapiro in the series The People v. O. J. Simpson: American Crime Story. He received an Emmy Award as a producer as well as nominations for a Primetime Emmy Award for Outstanding Supporting Actor in a Limited Series or Movie. He was also Emmy-nominated for his role in the action-comedy web series Die Hart (2021).

Outside of acting, Travolta has released nine albums, including four singles that have charted on the Billboard Hot 100's Top 40. His albums have typically accompanied films he has starred in, such as Grease: The Original Soundtrack from the Motion Picture (1978), which topped the Billboard 200. Travolta is also a private pilot.

== Early life ==
John Joseph Travolta was born on February 18, 1954, in Englewood, New Jersey, an inner-ring suburb of New York City. He is the youngest of six children.

His father, Salvatore "Sam" Travolta, was a semiprofessional American football player turned tire salesman and partner in a tire company, Travolta Tire Exchange. His mother, Helen Cecilia (née Burke), was an actress and singer who had appeared in The Sunshine Sisters, a radio vocal group, and acted and directed before becoming a high school drama and English teacher. His siblings Joey, Ellen, Ann, Margaret, and Sam Travolta were all inspired by their mother's love of theater and drama and became actors. His father was a second-generation Italian American with roots in Godrano, Sicily, and his mother was Irish American.

He grew up in an Irish-American neighborhood and said that his household was predominantly Irish in culture. He was raised Catholic, but later converted to Scientology in 1975 at age 21. He converted after being given the book Dianetics from former actress Joan Prather. Travolta attended Dwight Morrow High School, but dropped out as a junior at age 17 in 1971.

== Career ==
=== 1970s: Early career and mainstream success ===
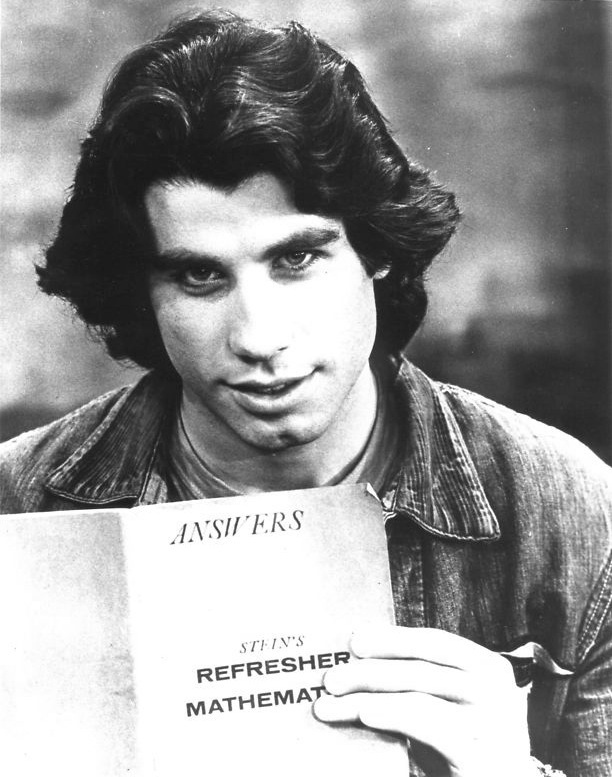
Travolta as Vinnie Barbarino in the ABC comedy Welcome Back, Kotter, c. 1976

After dropping out of school, Travolta moved across the Hudson River to New York City and landed a role in the touring company of the musical Grease as Doody and on Broadway in Over Here!, singing the Sherman Brothers' song "Dream Drummin'". He then moved to Los Angeles for professional reasons. Travolta's first screen role in California was as a fall victim in Emergency! in September 1972, but his first significant movie role was as Billy Nolan, a bully who was goaded into playing a prank on Sissy Spacek's character in the horror film Carrie (1976), directed by Brian de Palma. Around that time, he landed his star-making role as Vinnie Barbarino in the ABC television sitcom Welcome Back, Kotter (1975–1979), in which his sister, Ellen, also occasionally appeared (as Arnold Horshack's mother).

Travolta had a hit single titled "Let Her In", peaking at number 10 on the Billboard Hot 100 chart in July 1976. In the next few years, he starred in the television movie The Boy in the Plastic Bubble and two of his most noted screen roles: Tony Manero in the dance drama Saturday Night Fever (1977) and Danny Zuko in the musical Grease (1978). The films were among the most commercially successful pictures of the decade and catapulted Travolta to international stardom. Saturday Night Fever earned him a nomination for the Academy Award for Best Actor, making him, at age 24, one of the youngest performers ever nominated for the Best Actor Oscar. His mother and his sister Ann appeared very briefly in Saturday Night Fever and his sister Ellen played a waitress in Grease. Travolta performed on the Grease soundtrack album. After the failure of the romance Moment by Moment (1978), in which he starred with Lily Tomlin, Travolta rebounded in 1980, riding a nationwide country music craze that followed on the heels of his hit film Urban Cowboy, in which he starred with Debra Winger.

=== 1980s: Urban Cowboy, Blow Out, and career decline ===
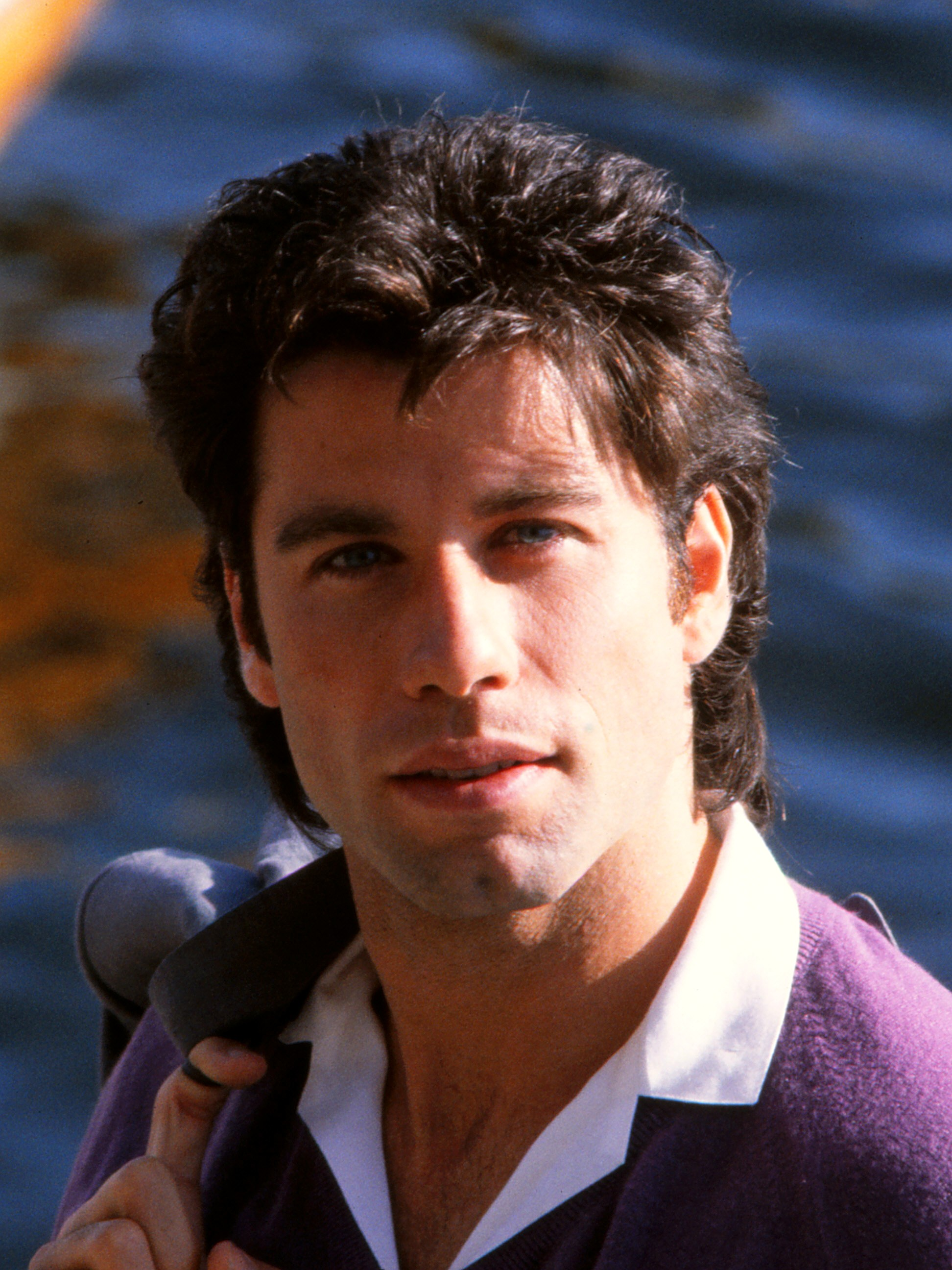
Travolta in 1983

Travolta followed up Urban Cowboy with a starring role in Brian de Palma's 1981 film Blow Out, which was critically lauded but a box-office disappointment, likely due to its bleak ending. After Blow Out came a series of commercial and critical failures which sidelined Travolta's acting career. These included Two of a Kind (1983), a romantic comedy reuniting him with Olivia Newton-John, and Perfect (1985), co-starring Jamie Lee Curtis. He also starred in Staying Alive, the 1983 sequel to Saturday Night Fever, for which he trained rigorously to portray a professional dancer and lost 20 pounds (9.1 kg); the film was a financial success, grossing over $65 million, though it, too, was scorned by critics.

During that time, Travolta was offered, but declined, lead roles in what would become box-office hits, including American Gigolo and An Officer and a Gentleman, both of which went to Richard Gere, as well as Splash, which went to Tom Hanks. In 1989, Travolta starred with Kirstie Alley in Look Who's Talking, which grossed $297 million, making it his most successful film since Grease.

=== 1990s: Career revival ===
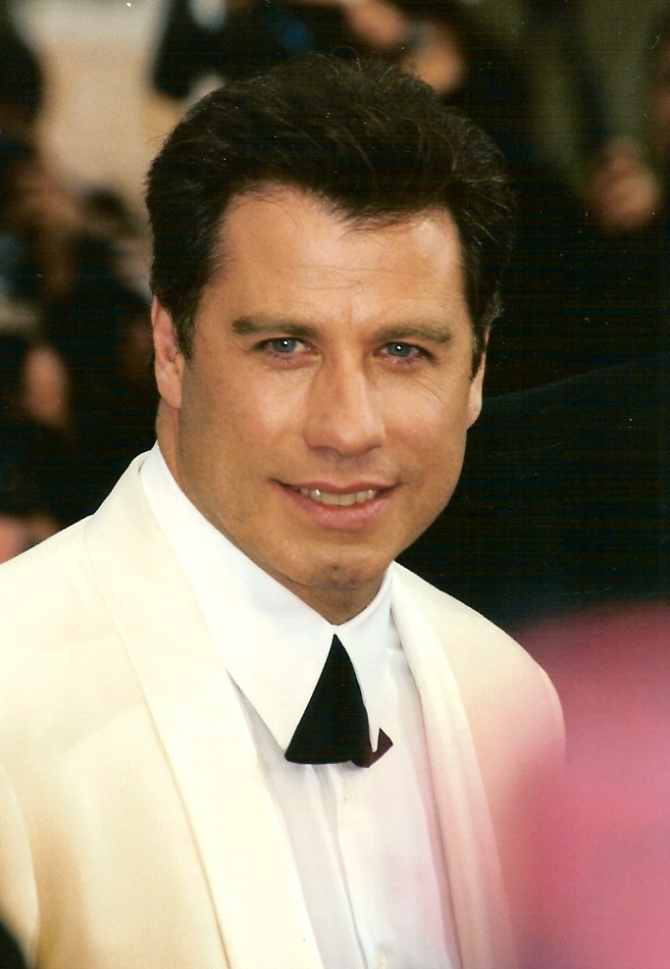
Travolta in 1997

Travolta subsequently starred in Look Who's Talking Too (1990) and Look Who's Talking Now (1993), but it was not until he played Vincent Vega in Quentin Tarantino's hit Pulp Fiction (1994), with Samuel L. Jackson, for which he received an Academy Award nomination, that his career was revived. It was Travolta's third film alongside Bruce Willis. The movie shifted him back onto the A-list and notable roles that followed include a movie-buff loan shark in Get Shorty (1995), a factory worker in White Man's Burden (1995), a corrupt U.S. Air Force pilot in Broken Arrow (1996), an everyman with extraordinary powers in Phenomenon (1996), an archangel in Michael (1996), an FBI agent and terrorist in Face/Off (1997), a Bill Clinton–esque presidential candidate in Primary Colors (1998), a desperate attorney in A Civil Action (1998), and a military investigator in The General's Daughter (1999).

=== 2000s: Continuation in Hollywood films ===
In 2000, Travolta starred in and co-produced the science fiction film Battlefield Earth, based on the novel of the same name by L. Ron Hubbard, in which he played the villainous leading role as a leader of a group of aliens that enslaves humanity on a bleak future Earth. The film was a dream project for Travolta since the book's release in 1982, when Hubbard wrote to him to try to help make a film adaptation. The film received almost universally negative reviews and did very poorly at the box office. Travolta's performance in Battlefield Earth also earned him two Razzie Awards.

Throughout the 2000s, Travolta remained busy as an actor, starring in Lucky Numbers (2000); Swordfish (2001); Domestic Disturbance (2001); Ladder 49 (2004); Be Cool (2005); Lonely Hearts (2006); Wild Hogs (2007); the Disney animated film Bolt (2008), in which Travolta voiced the title character; The Taking of Pelham 123; and Old Dogs (both 2009).

In 2007, Travolta played Edna Turnblad in the remake of Hairspray, his first musical since Grease.

=== 2010s–2020s: Shift to direct-to-video and streaming ===
Since 2010, Travolta has starred mostly in action films and thrillers, such as From Paris with Love (2010) and Savages (2012). In 2014, Travolta made headlines for mispronouncing the name of Idina Menzel by calling her "Adele Dazeem" during the live broadcast of the 86th Academy Awards; he subsequently apologized and expressed embarrassment for the error. The mispronunciation evolved into a popular internet meme which ultimately boosted Menzel's popularity, causing Menzel to remark that Travolta's error "was one of the best things that happened" in her career. In 2016, he returned to television in the first season of the anthology series American Crime Story, titled The People v. O. J. Simpson, in which he played lawyer Robert Shapiro. For his performance he received a nomination for the Primetime Emmy Award for Outstanding Supporting Actor in a Limited or Anthology Series or Movie. In 2020, he costarred in the Quibi action-comedy web series Die Hart, and received another Primetime Emmy Award nomination.

Following the death of his wife Kelly Preston in July 2020, Travolta hinted on his Instagram account that he would be putting his career on hold, stating, "I will be taking some time to be there for my children who have lost their mother, so forgive me in advance if you don't hear from us for a while".

Travolta's directorial debut, Propeller One-Way Night Coach, premiered at the 2026 Cannes Film Festival where he also received an Honorary Palme d'Or. The film was released on the streaming service Apple TV on May 29, 2026.

== Other ventures ==
=== Aviation ===
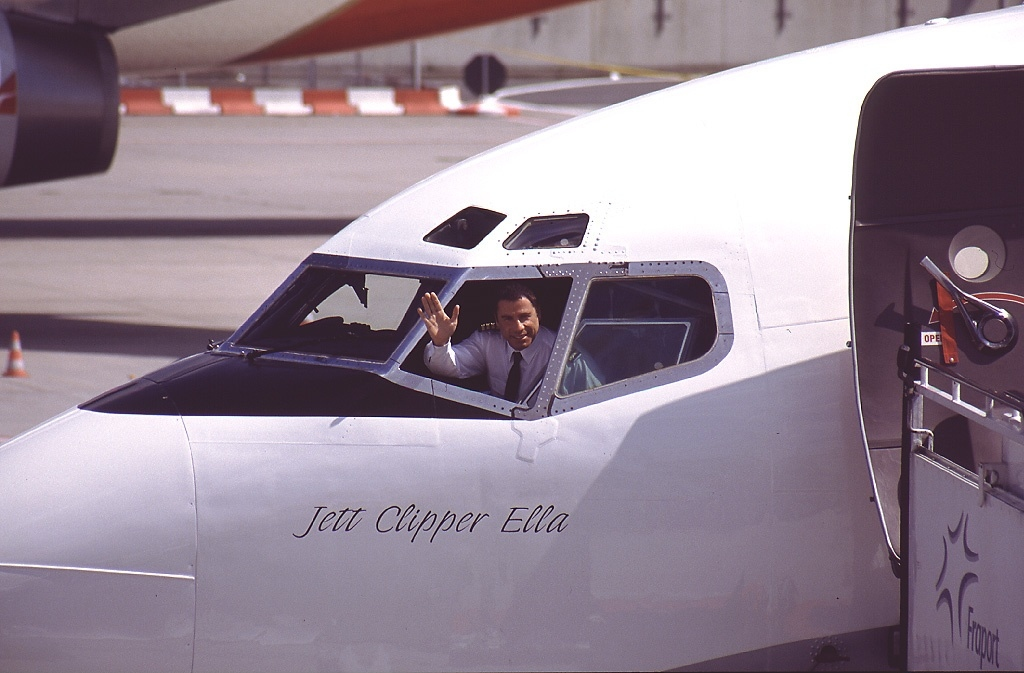
Travolta in the cockpit of his Boeing 707 in 2002

Travolta is a pilot and rated to fly Boeing 707 and 747 planes. (Note: FAA Airmen Certification Database of September 1, 2014, lists Travolta as ID A1927078, with private pilot licence ratings P/ASEL (Private Airplane Single Engine Land), P/AMEL (Private Airplane Multi-Engine Land), P/INSTA (Private Instrument Airplane), and eight aircraft: P/B-707 (Boeing 707), P/B-720 (Boeing 720), P/CE-500 (Cessna 500), P/CL-600 (Bombardier Challenger 600), P/EA-500S (Eclipse 500), P/G-1159 (Gulfstream II), P/HS-125 (British Aerospace 125), P/LR-JET (Learjet).) He owns four aircraft. Travolta owned an ex-Qantas Boeing 707-138B (Ex-VH-EBM) which bears an old livery of Qantas, and Travolta acted as an official goodwill ambassador for the airline wherever he flew. Travolta named his 707 "Jett Clipper Ella", in honor of his children. The "Clipper" in the name refers to the use of that word by Pan Am as the company's call sign as well as in the names of their aircraft. In 2017, Travolta donated the Boeing 707 to the Historical Aircraft Restoration Society (HARS) near Wollongong, Australia. This was expected to be flown to Australia in November 2019, but was later delayed to sometime in 2020 due to condition of the aircraft. Travolta planned to be on board when the aircraft was to be flown to Illawarra Regional Airport, where HARS is based, but was not allowed to fly it, because it was to be registered as an Australian aircraft.

On November 24, 1992, Travolta was piloting his Gulfstream N728T at night above a solid undercast when he experienced a total electrical system failure while flying under instrument flight rules into Washington National Airport. During the emergency landing, he almost had a mid-air collision with a USAir Boeing 727, an event attributed to a risky decision by an air traffic controller.

In 1984, Travolta was inducted into the American Academy of Achievement and presented with the Golden Plate Award by Awards Council member General Chuck Yeager, USAF. Travolta was inducted into the Living Legends of Aviation in 2007 and acts as the award show's official ambassador.

On September 13, 2010, during the first episode of the final season of her talk show, Oprah Winfrey announced that she would be taking her entire studio audience on an eight-day, all-expenses-paid trip to Australia, with Travolta serving as pilot for the trip. He had helped Winfrey plan the trip for more than a year.

He is the author of the book Propeller One-Way Night Coach, the story of a young boy's first flight. He adapted the book into the 2026 film of the same name.

His estate in Ocala, Florida, is situated at Jumbolair Airport with its own runway and taxiway right to his house, with two outbuildings for covered access to planes.

=== Philanthropy ===
After the 2010 Haiti earthquake, joining other celebrities in helping with the relief efforts, Travolta reportedly flew his Boeing 707 full of supplies, doctors, and Scientologist Volunteer Ministers into the disaster area.

== Personal life ==
=== Relationships and family ===
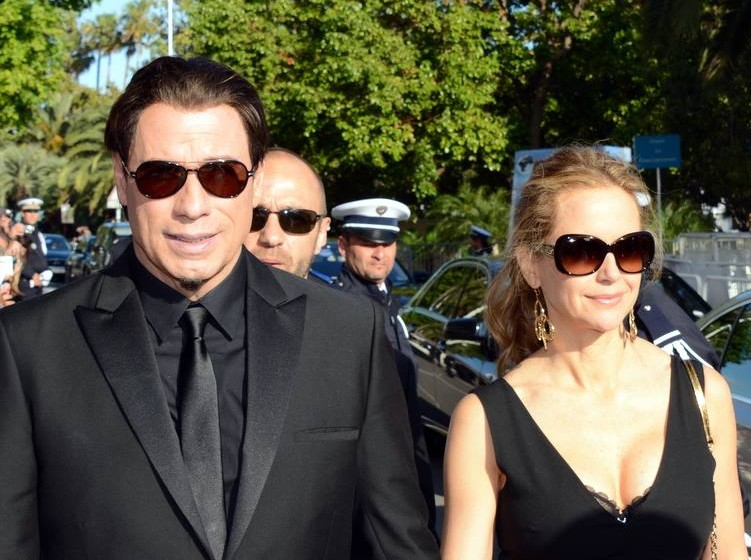
Travolta with wife Kelly Preston at the 2014 Cannes Film Festival

Travolta was in a relationship with actress Diana Hyland, whom he met while filming The Boy in the Plastic Bubble (1976). They remained together until Hyland's death from breast cancer on March 27, 1977. In 1980, Travolta dated French actress Catherine Deneuve. Travolta also had an on-again/off-again relationship with actress Marilu Henner, which ended permanently in 1985. In 1988 while filming The Experts, Travolta met actress Kelly Preston, whom he married in Paris in 1991. They had three children: Jett (1992–2009), Ella Bleu (born 2000), and Benjamin (born 2010). They regularly attended marriage counseling and Travolta has stated that therapy helped the marriage. They lived near Ocala, Florida.

On January 2, 2009, Jett died at age sixteen while on a Christmas vacation in The Bahamas. A Bahamian death certificate was issued, attributing the cause of death to a seizure. Jett, who had a history of seizures, reportedly had Kawasaki disease since the age of two. Travolta testified at the trial of two defendants (a paramedic and a former Bahamas senator) accused of attempting to extort $25 million from him using private documents tied to his son's death. On the stand, he publicly confirmed for the first time that Jett was autistic and had suffered regular seizures. After a mistrial, Travolta dropped the charges and has credited his immediate family and Scientology with helping him to cope with Jett's death and move forward with his career. In memory of Jett, Travolta created the Jett Travolta Foundation, a nonprofit organization to help children with special needs. It has contributed to organizations such as the Oprah Winfrey Leadership Academy, Institutes for the Achievement of Human Potential, and Simon Wiesenthal Center.

On July 12, 2020, Travolta's wife, Kelly Preston, died at the age of 57, at their home in Clearwater, Florida, two years after she was diagnosed with breast cancer. Preston had undergone treatment at different hospitals, and at the time of her death, was receiving treatment at the MD Anderson Cancer Center in Houston, Texas.

Travolta is "good friend[s]" with American rapper Pitbull. The two collaborated on Travolta's 2018 film Gotti, for which Pitbull scored and wrote the song "Amore". In 2019, Travolta debuted a new shaved head look after receiving advice from Pitbull to do so. Later that year, Travolta appeared in the music video for Pitbull's single "3 to Tango".

=== Legal issues ===
In May 2012, an anonymous masseur filed a lawsuit against Travolta, citing claims of sexual assault and battery. The lawsuit also alleged that Travolta had said that "Hollywood is controlled by homosexual Jewish men" and that his career and success were the product of sexual favours Travolta had given to them. A lawyer for Travolta said that the allegations were "complete fiction and fabrication". Travolta's counsel also stated that his client would be able to prove that he was not in California on the day in question and asserted that Travolta would "sue the attorney and Plaintiff for malicious prosecution" after getting the case thrown out. A second masseur later joined the lawsuit, making similar claims. Both lawsuits were subsequently dropped by the complainants and dismissed without prejudice.

On September 27, 2012, Los Angeles Superior Court Judge Malcolm Mackey dismissed a defamation lawsuit against Travolta and his attorney Marty Singer by writer Robert Randolph because he found that a letter, written by Singer in response to allegations in a book by Randolph, was protected by free speech.

In July 2014, a California court allowed Travolta's former private pilot, Douglas Gotterba, to proceed with a lawsuit challenging the confidentiality and non-disclosure provisions of the termination agreement signed between Gotterba and Travolta years earlier. Travolta's lawyers served Gotterba with a cease and desist letter in 2012 after learning through a tip that Gotterba was planning to release a book about his time working for Travolta between 1981 and 1987, during which period Gotterba claims to have had a homosexual extramarital affair with Travolta. Travolta strongly denied the allegations.

== Discography ==
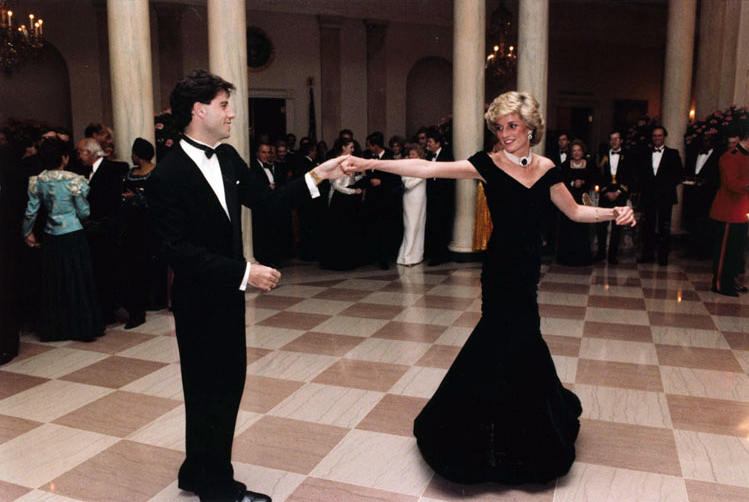
Travolta dancing with Diana, Princess of Wales, at the White House in 1985. The dress she wore came to be known as the "Travolta dress".

=== Studio albums ===
| Title | Album details | Peak chart positions |
| Title | Album details | US |
|---|---|---|
| John Travolta | Released: 1976; Label: Midland International; Formats: CD, cassette | 39 |
| Can't Let You Go | Released: 1977; Label: Midland International; Formats: CD, cassette | 69 |

=== Compilations ===
| Title | Album details | Peak chart positions |
| Title | Album details | US |
|---|---|---|
| Travolta Fever | Released: 1978; Label: Midland International; Formats: LP, CD, cassette, digital download, streaming | 161 |
| Let Her In: The Best of John Travolta | Released: 1996; Label: Milan Records; Formats: LP, CD, cassette | — |
| The Collection | Released: April 29, 2003; Label: Madacy; Formats: LP, CD, cassette | — |

=== Soundtracks ===
| Title | Album details | Peak chart positions | | | | | | | | | | Certifications |
| Title | Album details | US | AUS | CAN | FRA | GER | JPN | NL | NOR | SWE | UK | Certifications |
|---|---|---|---|---|---|---|---|---|---|---|---|---|
| Grease (with Olivia Newton-John) | Release: April 14, 1978; Format: LP, CD, cassette, 8-track, digital download, streaming; Label: RSO, Polydor | 1 | 1 | 1 | 3 | 1 | 1 | 1 | 1 | 1 | 1 | RIAA: 13× Platinum; ARIA: 14× Platinum; BPI: 9× Platinum; BVMI: 5× Gold; MC: Diamond; SNEP: Platinum |
| Two of a Kind (with Olivia Newton-John) | Release: December 16, 1983; Format: LP, CD, cassette, 8-track, digital download, streaming; Label: MCA | 26 | 35 | 32 | — | 39 | 29 | — | — | — | — | RIAA: Platinum |
| Hairspray | Release: July 10, 2007; Format: LP, CD; Label: New Line | 2 | 5 | 2 | 34 | — | — | — | — | — | — | RIAA: Platinum; ARIA: Platinum; BPI: Gold; MC: Platinum |

=== Holiday albums ===
| Title | Album details | Peak chart positions | |
| Title | Album details | US | AUS |
|---|---|---|---|
| This Christmas (with Olivia Newton-John) | Release: November 9, 2012; Format: CD, digital download; Label: Universal | 81 | 33 |

=== Singles ===
| Year | Title | Peak chart positions | | | | | | | | Certifications | Album |
| Year | Title | US | US Cash Box | US Record World | US AC | AUS | CAN | CAN AC | UK | Certifications | Album |
|---|---|---|---|---|---|---|---|---|---|---|---|
| 1974 | "Dream Drummin'" | — | — | — | — | — | — | — | — | | Over Here! |
| 1975 | "Easy Evil" | — | — | — | — | — | — | — | — | | Can't Let You Go |
| 1975 | "Can't Let You Go" | — | — | — | — | — | — | — | — | | Can't Let You Go |
| 1976 | "You Set My Dreams to Music" | — | — | — | — | — | — | — | — | | Can't Let You Go |
| 1976 | "Goodnight Mr. Moon" | — | — | — | — | — | — | — | — | | John Travolta |
| 1976 | "Rainbows" | — | — | — | — | — | — | — | — | | John Travolta |
| 1976 | "Settle Down" | — | — | — | — | — | — | — | — | | Can't Let You Go |
| 1976 | "Moonlight Lady" | — | — | — | — | — | — | — | — | | Can't Let You Go |
| 1976 | "Right Time of the Night" | — | — | — | — | — | — | — | — | | Travolta Fever |
| 1976 | "Big Trouble" | — | — | — | — | — | — | — | — | | John Travolta |
| 1976 | "What Would They Say" | — | — | — | — | — | — | — | — | | Can't Let You Go |
| 1976 | "Back Doors Crying" | — | — | — | — | — | — | — | — | | Can't Let You Go |
| 1976 | "Let Her In" | 10 | 5 | 12 | 16 | 74 | 7 | 12 | — | | John Travolta |
| 1976 | "Whenever I'm Away from You" | 38 | 62 | 64 | 26 | — | 61 | 29 | — | | Can't Let You Go |
| 1976 | "Slow Dancing" | — | — | — | — | — | — | — | — | | Can't Let You Go |
| 1976 | "It Had to Be You" | — | — | — | — | — | — | — | — | | John Travolta |
| 1976 | "I Don't Know What I Like About You Baby" | — | — | — | — | — | — | — | — | | John Travolta |
| 1977 | "All Strung Out on You" | 34 | 28 | 48 | 35 | — | 30 | | | | Can't Let You Go |
| 1977 | "(Feels So Good) Slow Dancin" | 106 | — | 127 | — | — | — | — | — | | Can't Let You Go |
| 1977 | "Baby, I Could Be So Good at Lovin' You" | — | — | — | — | — | — | — | — | | John Travolta |
| 1977 | "Razzamatazz" | — | — | — | — | — | — | — | — | | John Travolta |
| 1978 | "You're the One That I Want" (with Olivia Newton-John) | 1 | 3 | 1 | 23 | 1 | 2 | — | 1 | RIAA: Platinum; BPI: Platinum; BVMI: Gold; RMNZ: 2× Platinum; SNEP: Gold | Grease |
| 1978 | "Summer Nights" (with Olivia Newton-John) | 5 | 3 | 4 | 21 | 6 | 3 | — | 1 | RIAA: Gold; BPI: Silver; MC: Gold; RMNZ: Platinum; SNEP: Gold | Grease |
| 1978 | "Sandy" | — | — | — | — | — | — | — | 2 | BPI: Gold | Grease |
| 1978 | "Greased Lightnin'" | 47 | 45 | 51 | — | 40 | — | — | 11 | BPI: Silver; RMNZ: Gold | Grease |
| 1980 | "Never Gonna Fall in Love Again" | — | — | — | — | — | — | — | — | | John Travolta |
| 1983 | "Take a Chance" (with Olivia Newton-John) | — | — | — | 3 | — | — | | — | | Two of a Kind |
| 1990 | "The Grease Megamix" (with Olivia Newton-John) | — | — | — | — | 1 | — | — | 3 | | non-album singles |
| 1991 | "Grease: The Dream Mix" (with Frankie Valli & Olivia Newton-John) | — | — | — | — | — | — | — | 47 | | non-album singles |
| 1997 | "Two Sleepy People" (with Carly Simon) | — | — | — | — | — | — | — | — | | non-album singles |
| 2008 | "I Thought I Lost You" (with Miley Cyrus) | — | — | — | — | — | — | — | — | | Bolt |

=== Other certified songs ===
| Year | Title | Certifications | Album |
|---|---|---|---|
| 1974 | "We Go Together" (with Olivia Newton-John) | BPI: Silver | Grease |

== Awards and nominations ==
Travolta was nominated for the Academy Award for Best Actor for his performances in Saturday Night Fever and Pulp Fiction. He won a Golden Globe Award for Best Actor in a Motion Picture – Musical or Comedy for his performance in Get Shorty and has received a total of six nominations, the most recent being in 2011. In 2014, he received the IIFA Award for Outstanding Achievement in International Cinema.

== See also ==
- List of oldest and youngest Academy Award winners and nominees – Youngest nominees for Best Lead Actor
- List of actors with Academy Award nominations
- List of actors with more than one Academy Award nomination in the acting categories
- List of Golden Globe winners
- List of Primetime Emmy Award winners
