= Propeller One-Way Night Coach =

2026 film by John Travolta

- Release poster
- Directed by: John Travolta
- Screenplay by: John Travolta
- Based on: Propeller One-Way Night Coach by John Travolta
- Produced by: John Travolta; Jason Berger; Amy Laslett
- Starring: Clark Shotwell; Kelly Eviston-Quinnett; Ella Bleu Travolta; Olga Hoffmann
- Narrated by: John Travolta
- Cinematography: Paul de Lumen
- Edited by: Mark J Marraccini; Adam Varney
- Music by: Tim Aarons; Alec Puro; Eric Meyers
- Production companies: JTP Productions; Kids at Play
- Distributed by: Apple TV
- Release dates: May 15, 2026 (Cannes); May 29, 2026 (United States)
- Running time: 60 minutes
- Country: United States
- Language: English

Propeller One-Way Night Coach is a 2026 American family adventure film written, co-produced, and directed by John Travolta (in his directorial debut), based on his own 1997 children's novel of the same name. The cast includes Clark Shotwell, Kelly Eviston-Quinnett, Travolta's daughter Ella Bleu, Olga Hoffmann, and Travolta himself.

The film extensively features a Lockheed L-1049 Super Constellation aircraft.

The film had its world premiere at the Cannes Premiere section of the 2026 Cannes Film Festival on May 15. It was released globally by Apple TV on May 29, and received mixed reviews from critics.

== Plot ==
Jeff, a middle-aged man, recalls how, on the night of December 28, 1962, he was an 8-year-old boy being dropped off with his 49-year-old mother Helen at New York’s Idlewild Airport for his first flight, a prospect that excited him given that he was an aviation enthusiast. As the plane began taking off, Jeff recalled how the purpose of their trip was to travel to Los Angeles so Helen could try her hand at acting in Hollywood.

Some time after the plane was in the air, a middle-aged man named Harry flirtatiously approached Jeff and Helen and asked to sit next to them. Helen managed to distract Jeff for a while but when he later confronted Harry about his marital status, the man left. After a short stop in Pittsburgh due to poor weather, Jeff and Helen were back in the air. During this portion of the trip, Helen and flight attendant Liz conversed about the latter’s experiences as an escapee of Nazi concentration camps, bringing the women closer. When the plane reached Chicago, Jeff and Helen had to change planes and learned that Liz would not be able to continue with them on their journey. However, she had arranged for them complimentary first class tickets on a jet to Kansas City and Denver.

During the flight, Jeff flagged down a flight attendant. As she approached him, he immediately became infatuated. He pestered her with questions, learning that her name was Doris, she was 21 years of age, had recently broken up with her boyfriend, enjoyed flying in a Boeing 707 most, and that her mother was the broadcaster he had heard announce his flight at Idlewild Airport. Stopping in Kansas City, Jeff bought a replica of the propeller plane but accidentally broke it. Dejected, Doris consoled him with the fact that even real airplanes could break, an idea that would become revelatory to Jeff for the rest of his life.

In Denver to change flights, Jeff was surprised to learn that Liz had also arranged for them to fly in a Boeing 707 to Los Angeles. Though elated from an aviation perspective, he was saddened by the prospect of never meeting Doris again. On the Boeing, Jeff met Skipper, another young boy interested in aviation, and the two became fast friends. He also met Skipper’s unmarried father, Henry, and introduced him to Helen. To top it off, Doris surprised Jeff with her appearance, explaining that she had changed her schedule to see him one last time.

At LAX, Jeff noticed a crew of reporters from Life waiting outside of the plane. They were there for the pilot, who had just flown his last flight and was to retire imminently. Hearing from Doris how much Jeff loved aviation, the pilot offered Jeff the opportunity to walk the jetway with him. In front of the reporters, the pilot took off the wings clipped to his uniform and placed them on Jeff because he believed that he had “flying in his blood.”

In the present, a 39-year-old Jeff explains that the retiring pilot’s gesture inspired him to become a pilot. He also married Doris and the 2 are living happily as an aviation couple; Doris replaced her mother as the broadcaster at Idlewild and Jeff became in charge of the route from New York City to Los Angeles. Helen and Henry dated for some time but then parted ways, though the former now works happily as an acting instructor at Pasadena Playhouse, with Liz as her long-time favorite student. Jeff considers his life to have been wonderful.

== Cast ==
- Clark Shotwell as Jeff
- Kelly Eviston-Quinnett as Helen, Jeff's mother
- Ellen Travolta as Grandma
- Ella Bleu Travolta as Doris
- Olga Hoffmann as Liz
- Margaret Travolta as Barbara
- Charlie Berger as Skipper
- Jay Curtis as Henry, Skipper's bachelor father
- John Travolta as Retiring Captain / Older Jeff (Narrator)
- Joey Travolta as News Reporter

== Production ==
In October 1997, actor John Travolta released his children's novel titled Propeller One-Way Night Coach. In November 2025, it was revealed that he had adapted his own novel into his directorial debut with Clark Shotwell cast in the lead role as Jeff. In April 2026, it was revealed that Kelly Eviston-Quinnett, Ella Bleu Travolta, and Olga Hoffmann had also joined the cast.

== Release ==
Propeller One-Way Night Coach had its world premiere at the 2026 Cannes Film Festival, in a non-competitive section on May 15. It was released on Apple TV on May 29.

== Reception ==
On review aggregator website Rotten Tomatoes, the film holds an approval rating of 50% based on 44 reviews, with an average rating of 4.9/10; the site's critical consensus states, "For all its rough edges and occasionally awkward execution, Propeller One-Way Night Coach conveys a genuine sense of wonder and affection for its characters even when its idiosyncratic vision proves more compelling than its filmmaking." On Metacritic, which uses a weighted average, the film has a score of 49 out of 100 based on 15 critics, indicating "mixed or average" reviews.

Robbie Collin of The Telegraph rated the film 1 out of 5 stars, describing the viewing experience as "like watching a toddler walk into a lamp post".
