= Doctor's Orders (song) =

1974 single by both Sunny and Carol Douglas

"Doctor's Orders" is a song written by Roger Cook, Roger Greenaway and Geoff Stephens which, in 1974, was a hit in the United Kingdom for Sunny of Sue and Sunny; in the United States the song was a hit for Carol Douglas.

== Sunny version ==
"Doctor's Orders"

Single by Sunny

from the album Doctor's Orders
- B-side: "It's Only When You're Feeling Lonely"
- Released: January 1974
- Recorded: November 1973
- Genre: R&B, soul
- Length: 2:48
- Label: CBS
- Songwriter(s): Roger Cook, Roger Greenaway, Geoff Stephens
- Producer(s): Roger Greenaway

Sunny singles chronology
"Doctor's Orders"	"A Warm and Tender Romance"

In 1969, Roger Greenaway along with Sue and Sunny were recruited by Tony Hiller for the group Brotherhood of Man; Greenaway and Roger Cook — who had been writing songs together since 1965 as well as recording as David and Jonathan — were both house writers for Hiller's production company.

By 1973, the Brotherhood of Man's original members had opted out of the group and although Sue and Sunny had generally recorded as a team Sunny recalls that at this time "Sue decided she wanted to spend some time having babies, so I was just left to get on with things by myself. Roger Cook knew that I was going solo and rang me up to say that he had a song for me. Anyway, I went round to see him, heard the song and thought it might do something."

Sunny cut the track in November 1973 with Roger Greenaway producing while Chris Gunning provided the arrangement and conducted.

Shopped to CBS for a January 1974 release, "Doctor's Orders" gained momentum through club play but met resistance from BBC Radio, unsavoury undertones being read into the storyline of a woman consulting a doctor over intimate concerns. "Doctor's Orders" finally broke into the UK Singles Chart dated 30 March 1974 at number 42, to rise to a peak of number 7 on 4 May that year. The single was also a hit in Ireland (number 4) and, in the summer of 1974, in Argentina (number 14) and South Africa (number 16).

Doctor's Orders was also the title of Sunny's album released in January 1974 which, besides "Doctor's Orders", featured the Cook/Greenaway/Stephens compositions "Couldn't I Change Your Mind" and "Never Say Never", plus "Oh My Joe" (Cook/Greenaway/Tony Macaulay), "A Warm and Tender Romance" (Greenaway/Macaulay) and "Somebody Warm Like Me" (Macaulay). The album also featured the Brotherhood of Man track "Maybe the Morning", plus Sunny's renditions of the Drifters' hit "Like Sister and Brother" (Cook/Stephens) and White Plains' hit "My Baby Loves Lovin'" (Cook/Greenaway). The other tracks were "It's Only When You're Feeling Lonely" (the B-side of "Doctor's Orders"), "Don't Come Back" (S. Leslie) and "Lean on Me".

"A Warm and Tender Romance" backed with "Don't Come Back" was released as a follow-up single to "Doctor's Orders" but failed to chart.

=== Chart performance ===
==== Weekly charts ====
National chart w/ peak position (1974)
Argentina	14
Australia	46
South Africa	16
Ireland	4
UK	7

==== Year-end charts ====
Chart (1974)	Rank
UK	88

== Carol Douglas version ==
=== Background ===
"Doctor's Orders"

Single by Carol Douglas

from the album The Carol Douglas Album
- B-side: "Baby Don't Let This Good Love Die"
- Released: November 1974
- Genre: R&B, soul, disco
- Length: 2:58 (Single Version), 4:30 (Album Version)
- Label: Midland International
- Songwriter(s): Roger Cook, Roger Greenaway, Geoff Stephens
- Producer(s): Ed O'Loughlin

Carol Douglas singles chronology
"I Don't Mind" (as Carolyn Cooke)" (1965)	"Doctor's Orders" (1974)	"A Hurricane is Coming Tonite" (1975)

The American version of "Doctor's Orders" was recorded for Midland International who ran an ad in Showbiz magazine specifically to recruit a singer to cover Sunny's UK hit for the US market: the successful applicant, Carol Douglas, was a veteran performer who had remained an unknown recording artist.

Douglas recalled when she first auditioned she was told "I sounded great, but too black. [The track's] producers wanted to capture my more melodic pop/commercial tones which undeniably made me sound white on the radio." Although Douglas admitted to reservations about the song itself, "I really [would have] wanted a more soulful song", she also recalled, "I felt the minute I heard the music that it was going to be something, and after hearing my voice on the track it was even more amazing ... [It] did throw me off when they played me the [Sunny] version. So I had to approach [singing the song] in my own way."

Douglas' version, recorded at Groove Sound Studio in New York City, was produced by Meco Monardo but because of contractual complications the production credit was assigned to Midland International vice-president Ed O'Loughlin. One of the players on the session was guitarist Jerry Friedman who, according to Monardo, invented the "bubble guitar" effect of "playing on a single muffled note" which became a trademark of disco music, as did the "gallop" effect provided by Carlos Martin pounding the conga with his fists.

In late 1974, Midland International issued test pressings of Douglas' "Doctor's Orders" to New York City discos where the positive response led to the track's rush release that November, with 100,000 units being sold the first week — mostly in the New York City area — and sales of 200,000 reported by 30 November 1974, the date of the Billboard Hot 100 chart on which Douglas' single debuted at number 79 to appear on the Top 40 that December, on its way to a number 11 peak (number 9 US Billboard R&B chart) in February 1975. "Doctor's Orders" also reached number 2 on the disco chart which Billboard had recently launched. The eventual U.S. sales tally for "Doctor's Orders" was cited as 900,000 units — 300,000 in the New York City area.

Also in February 1975, Douglas' "Doctor's Orders" hit number 1 on Canada's RPM chart and number 4 in France. The UK success of the Sunny original did not preclude a January 1975 UK release of Douglas' version: although this was not a success. Nevertheless, "Doctor's Orders" afforded Douglas a top ten hit in Belgium (number 10 in Flanders), Italy (number 8), New Zealand (number 6) and Spain (number 2), with her version also charting in Australia (number 31) and Germany (number 37). In June 1975, Midland International reported that global sales of the Carol Douglas single "Doctor's Orders" totaled one million units. Bytes of the song were used by CBS during their NBA telecasts.

=== Chart performance ===
==== Weekly charts ====
National chart (1974 &/or 1975) w/ peak position
Australia	31	Spain	2
Canadian RPM Top Singles	1	US Billboard Hot 100	11
US Cashbox Top 100	10		
Germany	37	US Billboard Disco	2
Italy	8	US Billboard Hot Soul Singles	9
New Zealand (RIANZ)	3	US Billboard Easy Listening	42
Regional chart (1975) w/ peak position
Belgium/ Flemish Region			10

==== Year-end charts ====
Chart (1975)	Rank
Canada	15
New Zealand	39
US Billboard Hot 100	64
US Cash Box Top 100	91

== Other versions ==
- Patsy Gallant had a Canadian single release concurrent with the Carol Douglas version of "Doctor's Orders": Gallant's version reached number 83 on the Canadian chart.
- Giti Pashaei, Persian singer, covered the song with Persian lyrics called "Owje Parvaz" (meaning: Flying as high as possible) in 1975.
- Québécois singer Anne Renée had an April 1975 single release of the French rendering "Le docteur m'a dit": Rene Angelil – then married to the singer – produced the disc and spoke the "Allo" heard in its intro.
- Sheila recorded the French rendering fr:C'est le cœur (Les ordres du docteur) in 1975: like the Carol Douglas version "C'est le coeur..." peaked at number 4 in France.
- The song was rendered in Finnish by Lea Laven as "Viittiks Tulla Takas" on the 1975 album Lea.
- Reggae singer Pluto Shervington covered "Doctor's Orders" on his 1975 album, Pluto, released by Wild Flower, a subsidiary of Federal Records, Jamaica.
- Van McCoy recorded a version of the song which was featured on his 1975 album Disco Baby.
- "Doctor's Orders" was a 1988 UK single release for Lisa Carter, reaching 78 in the UK.
- Sabrina remade the song for her 1988 album Super Sabrina.
- In September 2005 Girl Talk—comprising Barb Jungr, Claire Martin and Mari Wilson—recorded "Doctor's Orders" for their eponymous 2006 album release.
- In 2008, Jane McDonald recorded "Doctor's Orders" for her Jane album from which it was issued as a single.
