= Let Her In =

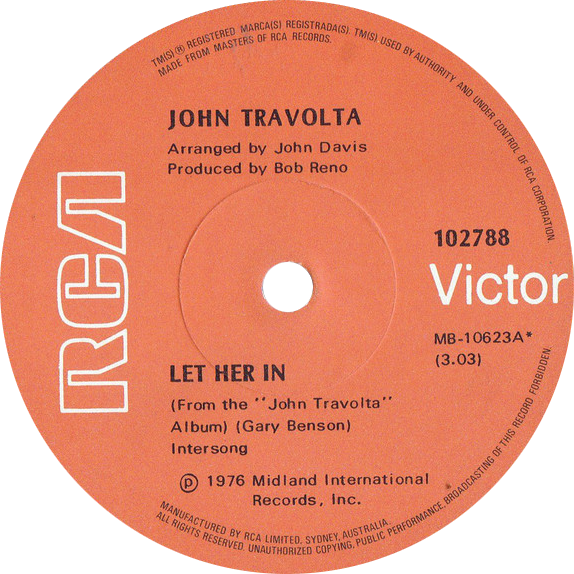
- Side A of the Australian single

Single by John Travolta

from the album John Travolta
- B-side: "Big Trouble"
- Released: April 1976
- Studio: Sigma Sound, Philadelphia, Pennsylvania
- Genre: Soft rock; bubblegum pop
- Length: 3:03
- Label: Midland Intl.
- Songwriter: Gary Benson
- Producer: Bob Reno

John Travolta singles chronology
"Back Doors Crying" (1976)	"Let Her In" (1976)	"Whenever I'm Away from You" (1976)

"Let Her In" is a song written and recorded by English singer-songwriter Gary Benson, and released as a single in 1973. It was covered by John Travolta in 1976, and was released as the first single from Travolta's self-titled second album. Travolta's version was a hit, spending five months on the U.S. Billboard Hot 100, and peaking at number 10. It also reached number 16 on the Adult Contemporary chart. On the Cash Box chart, the song peaked at number five. In Canada, "Let Her In" reached number seven on the RPM Top Singles chart.

"Let Her In" was released at the end of the first year of the four-year run of Welcome Back, Kotter, in which Travolta starred.

This song was his first and only top-ten hit as a solo artist in the United States, and the biggest hit of his in any country not to be tied to the film Grease. It was included on his 1978 double album compilation, Travolta Fever.

== Chart performance ==
=== Weekly charts ===
Chart (1976)	Peak position
Canadian RPM Top Singles	7
Canadian RPM Adult Contemporary	12
U.S. Billboard Hot 100	10
U.S. Billboard Easy Listening	16
U.S. Cashbox Top 100	5

Chart (1978)	Peak position
Australia (Kent Music Report)	74

=== Year-end charts ===
Chart (1976)	Rank
Canada	87
U.S. Billboard Hot 100	75
U.S. Cash Box	84

== Reception ==
Tom Breihan criticized Travolta's performance of "a moony and generic song" in his December 2019 Stereogum article and later called it "truly wretched" in his January 2020 A.V. Club article. Paul Grein of Billboard in August 2022 called the ballad "mopey".
