= Midland International Records =

American record label

Midland International Records (later Midsong International Records) was a US record label founded in 1974 by Eddie O'Loughlin and Bob Reno.

The label was best known for the hit records "Doctor's Orders" by Carol Douglas, "Fly, Robin, Fly" and "Get Up and Boogie" by Silver Convention, and "Let Her In" by John Travolta.

== History ==
Releases on the label were manufactured and distributed in the United States by RCA Records from 1974 to 1978. In 1977, legal action by Midland Radio which markets electronics using the Midland International name forced the record label to change its name to Midsong International. Midsong was also the name of the label's music publishing unit. Distribution shifted briefly in 1978 to MCA Records before switching to independent distribution later that year.

The label went out of business in 1980, a casualty of the backlash against disco music. Co-founder O'Loughlin then founded what is now Next Plateau Entertainment. The catalog was later taken over by Hot Productions, run by music industry veteran Henry Stone. Essential Media Group, based in Hallandale, Florida, now manages the catalog.

== See also ==
- List of record labels
