= Grease (franchise) =

American media franchise

- Official franchise logo, as released in 1978.
- Created by: Jim Jacobs & Warren Casey
- Original work: Grease
- Owners: Paramount Pictures (Skydance)
- Years: 1971–present

Films and television
- Films: Grease (1978); Grease 2 (1982); Premaloka (1987)
- Television series: Grease: You're the One That I Want! (2007); Grease Is the Word (2007); Grease: The School Musical (2023); Grease: Rise of the Pink Ladies (2023)

Theatrical presentations
- Musicals: Grease (1971); Cool Rider (2014)

Games
- Video game(s): Grease (2010); Grease Dance (2011)

The Grease franchise consists of American films and television productions, based on the 1971 musical. The stage production was first adapted for film with Grease (1978), followed by Grease 2 (1982). A prequel titled Summer Lovin' entered development beginning in 2019.

The franchise centers around the students of Rydell High, with each individual entry depicting the love story of a couple at opposite ends of the popularity spectrum: one, a popular and unruly student while the other is a shy immigrant and new student who is well behaved. The pair ultimately help each other step out of their comfort zone, balance each other out, and realize their ideal selves. The musical explores the themes of classic rock and roll overcoming differences (including opposing gangs), as the students experience high school and make memories together.

Revered as a cult classic, the original film was met with critical and financial success, and quickly became highest-grossing musical film ever (circa 1978), while its soundtrack album ended 1978 as the second-best-selling album of the year in the United States. The film earned an Oscar nomination at the 51st Academy Awards. In 2020, the film was selected for preservation in the National Film Registry by the Library of Congress as being "culturally, historically, or aesthetically significant". The sequel however, did not fare well at the box office nor with critics and was nominated for a Stinkers Bad Movie Awards for Worst Picture. Later on, it was awarded No. 13 in the 100 worst films of the 20th century, in Stinkers' "100 Years, 100 Stinkers" list.

The film series expanded into a franchise with the release of a Broadway musical adaptation, various reality television programs centered around the Broadway production, as well as releases in various other mediums. It will continue with the release of a streaming television series titled Grease: Rise of the Pink Ladies, an exclusive on Paramount+. Additionally, a prequel film titled Summer Lovin', which will depict the summer prior to the events of Grease, is in early development.

== Origin ==
Grease is a 1971 stage musical, originally written by Jim Jacobs and Warren Casey, that originated from the Chicago theater scene. It moved to Off-Broadway and then to Broadway in 1972, where it ran until 1980. The original musical was set in urban Chicago and was based on Jacobs's own teenage years, with several of the characters having identifiably Polish-American and Italian-American ethnicities. The Chicago production was more profane and had less musical elements, while the writers partially sanitized the production for Broadway audiences. The musical functioned as an ensemble comedy, while the subplots involving supporting characters were given greater development. The stage production ends with a definitive decision in Danny's favor, as he reverts to his old ways while Sandy transforms into the wild Pink Lady to fit in.

== Film ==
Film	U.S. release date	Director	Screenwriter	Story by	Producer(s)
Grease	June 16, 1978	Randal Kleiser	Bronté Woodard	Allan Carr	Allan Carr & Robert Stigwood
Grease 2	June 11, 1982	Patricia Birch	Ken Finkleman	Ken Finkleman	Allan Carr & Robert Stigwood

=== Grease (1978) ===
In fall 1958 following their summer romance, wholesome Australian immigrant Sandra "Sandy" Olsson and popular greaser Daniel "Danny" Zuko find themselves classmates, when Sandy enrolls at Rydell High School (in a generic setting based on suburban Philadelphia) instead of moving back home. At Rydell, Danny has long been the de facto leader of the T-Birds, a crew of fellow greasers; the T-Birds' female counterparts are the Pink Ladies, a tight-knit clique helmed by queen bee Betty Rizzo. As Danny attempts to maintain his reputation in the T-Birds as the coolest guy at the school among his peers, he struggles with keeping his relationship with Sandy alive. Sandy stands by her morals and education, being torn between the upright preppies of Rydell High (typified by cheerleader Patty Simcox) and the cruder Pink Ladies, to whose influences she eventually succumbs to keep Danny. Along the way the couple and their friends, experience adolescence among 1950s rock and roll culture: sex, substance abuse, and music.

==== Re-releases ====
Grease was re-released in May 1979 in 1,248 theatres in the United States and Canada, Paramount's biggest ever saturation release at the time, and grossed $4.5 million in its opening weekend. During the reissue, it overtook The Godfather and became Paramount Pictures' highest-grossing film of all-time. It was re-released in March 1998 for its 20th anniversary where it grossed a further $28 million in North America. An additional re-release in 2018, for its 40th anniversary grossed $1 million.

=== Grease 2 (1982) ===
In 1961, Stephanie Zinone has succeeded to the leadership of the Pink Ladies following Rizzo's graduation in the first film. Tired of the recurring drama, Stephanie breaks up with her boyfriend Johnny Nogerelli. She receives the admiration of Michael Carrington, a mild-mannered bookish new exchange student and Sandy's cousin. Michael seeks to overcome his nerdy ways while earning her affections by learning to ride a motorcycle, and taking on a secret identity that his peers call the "Cool Rider". Johnny grows jealous of Michelle's romantic pursuits, and as the leader of the T-Birds attempts to use his popularity to win her back.

=== Plans for future films ===
In 2003, Olivia Newton-John confirmed that a second sequel was being developed. "They're writing it, and we'll see what happens. If the script looks good, I'll do it. But I haven't seen the script, and it has to be cleverly done." Newton-John died in 2022 before any such script was completed.

In 2008, it was reported that Paramount was planning a new sequel to Grease that would debut straight to DVD.

In April 2019, Paramount Pictures announced a prequel movie titled Summer Lovin' was in development, with John August serving as screenwriter. The project will be a joint-venture production from Paramount Pictures, Paramount Players, Temple Hill Productions, and Picturestart. Receiving its title from the song, the plot will center around the summer in which Danny and Sandy met and fell in love. By July 2020, Brett Haley was hired to serve as director with the most recent draft of the script being written by Leah McKendrick.

== Television ==
=== Reality television ===
==== Grease: You're the One That I Want! (2007) ====
A reality television series of a talent competition of singing and dancing. From the producers of Dancing With the Stars, the series was patterned after a format designed and created by Andrew Lloyd Webber for the BBC series How Do You Solve a Problem Like Maria?. Hosted by Billy Bush and Denise van Outen, the series featured celebrity judges Kathleen Marshall and David Ian alongside co-creator Jim Jacobs, who helped narrow the search for the Broadway leads among the contestants.

The program generated so much interest in the upcoming Broadway revival that, ticket sales had topped $9 million. Despite this the series was declared a "ratings loser".

==== Grease Is the Word (2007) ====
The United Kingdom version of NBC's Grease: You're the One That I Want!, which aired in 2007. The series was a production of Syco TV for ITV, with Simon Cowell serving as producer. The winning couple, Susan McFadden & Danny Bayne, became the stars of the West End revival production of the stage musical at the Piccadilly Theatre.

The judges were David Ian, David Gest, Sinitta, and Brian Friedman. The series was hosted by Zoe Ball. The after-show titled Greased Lightnin' shared unseen auditions, behind-the-scenes videos, and interviews; was hosted by Holly Willoughby and aired on ITV2.

=== Television production ===
Grease Live! is a television special that was originally broadcast by Fox on January 31, 2016. It was a live, televised remake of the 1978 film Grease, executive produced by Marc Platt, directed by Thomas Kail, and starring Julianne Hough, Aaron Tveit, Vanessa Hudgens and Carlos PenaVega. Patterned on similar live television musicals that had recently been produced by NBC, the production incorporated elements and songs from both the original stage musical and the 1978 film version of Grease, as well as additional songs and a few elements (such as changing Sandy's last name to Young to reflect Hough's own background) that were not present in either. In an effort to emulate the "energy" of a theatrical setting, live audiences were incorporated into the production's stagings. Grease Live! was broadcast from Warner Bros. Studios, using two soundstages and the studio's outdoor backlot—the usage of the latter was notably affected by rain in the Los Angeles area on the day of the broadcast.

=== Series ===
In September 2019, a musical television series was announced to be in development titled, Grease: Rydell High. The show was ordered straight-to-series, and was to release exclusively on HBO Max. The project was a joint-production between Paramount Television, Picturestart, and Temple Hill Entertainment. Erik Feig served as producer for the show. The series was a prequel to the original film with returning and new characters, as well as new and old songs. By April 2020, Annabel Oakes was hired as writer and executive producer for the series. In May of the same year, the project was retitled as Grease: Rise of the Pink Ladies. In October 2020, it was announced that the series would be moving to Paramount+. Paramount+ released the ten episodes of the series over the course of spring 2023 before abruptly removing the series from public view that June.

== Main cast ==
Character	Films		Television
Character	Grease	Grease 2	Grease: Rise of the Pink Ladies
Principal McGee	Eve Arden	Eve Arden	Jackie Hoffman
Fran "Frenchy" Facciano	Didi Conn	Didi Conn	Madison Elizabeth Lagares
Betty Rizzo	Stockard Channing		Emma Shannon
Danny Zuko	John Travolta		
Sandra "Sandy" Olsson	Olivia Newton-John		
Coach Vince Calhoun	Sid Caesar	Sid Caesar	
Secretary Blanche Hodel	Dody Goodman	Dody Goodman	
Eugene Felsnick	Eddie Deezen	Eddie Deezen	
Leo Balmudo (Craterface)	Dennis C. Stewart	Dennis C. Stewart	
Mr. Rudie Spears	Dick Patterson	Dick Patterson	
Kenickie Murdoch	Jeff Conaway		
Doody	Barry Pearl		
Sonny Lantieri	Michael Tucci		
Putzie	Kelly Ward		
Marty Maraschino	Dinah Manoff		
Jan	Jamie Donnelly		
Michael Carrington		Maxwell Caulfield	
Stephanie Zinone		Michelle Pfeiffer	
Johnny Nogerelli		Adrian Zmed	
Goose McKenzie		Christopher McDonald	
Louis DiMucci		Peter Frechette	
Davey Jaworski		Leif Green	
Johnny Nogerelli		Adrian Zmed	
Sharon Cooper		Maureen Teefy	
Paulette Rebchuck		Lorna Luft	
Rhonda Ritter		Alison Price	
Dolores Rebchuck		Pamela Segall	
Jane Facciano			Marisa Davila
Olivia Valdovinos			Cheyenne Isabel Wells
Cynthia Zdunowski			Ari Notartomaso
Nancy Nakagawa			Tricia Fukuhara
Hazel Robertson			Shanel Bailey
Susan St. Clair			Madison Thompson
Richie Valdovinos			Johnathan Nieves
Buddy Aldridge			Jason Schmidt
Gil Rizzo			Nicholas McDonough

== Additional crew and production details ==
Title	Crew/Detail					
Title	Composer	Cinematographer	Editor(s)	Production companies	Distributing company	Running time
Grease	Michael Gibson	Bill Butler	John F. Burnett & Robert Pergament	Polydor Records, Paramount Pictures, Allan Car Production, Robert Stigwood Organization	Paramount Pictures	1 hr 50 mins
Grease 2	Louis St. Louis	Frank Stanley	John F. Burnett	Polydor Records, Paramount Pictures	Paramount Pictures	1 hr 54 mins
Grease: Rise of the Pink Ladies	TBA	TBA	TBA	Paramount Television Studios, Disappearing Ink, Temple Hill Productions, Picturestart Productions	Paramount+	TBA

== Reception ==
=== Box office and financial performance ===
Film	Box office gross			Box office ranking		Home video sales gross	Worldwide Total income	Budget	Ref.
Film	North America	Other territories	Worldwide	All time North America	All time worldwide	North America	Worldwide Total income	Budget	Ref.
Grease	$159,978,870	$206,200,000	$366,178,870	223	290	$26,247,660	$392,426,530	$6,000,000	
Grease 2	$14,297,083	$874,393	$15,171,476	4,283	5,735	—N/a	$15,171,476	$11,200,000	
Total	$174,275,953	$207,074,939	$381,350,346	x̄ #2,253	x̄ #3,012.5	$26,247,660	$407,598,006	$11,206,000	

=== Critical and public response ===
Title	Rotten Tomatoes	Metacritic
Grease	65% (158 reviews)	70/100 (15 reviews)
Grease 2	22% (89 reviews)	52/100 (11 reviews)
Grease: Rise of the Pink Ladies	63% (38 reviews)	59/100 (14 reviews)

== Accolades ==
Award	Grease
Academy Award for Best Original Song	Nominated

== Stage productions ==
Following the film's success, stage adaptations were revived. Despite this, the new productions were adjusted to align closer with the film release.

- Grease: Due to the popularity of the film adaptation and the involvement of film producer Robert Stigwood in the West End revival in 1993, the subsequent revivals adopted several of the changes made in the film. One notable change includes renaming the Burger Palace Boys to their film name of T-Birds. However, in the revival the role of Sandy Dumbrowski maintains the original character name from the original stage production. John Farrar, who wrote two of the new songs is credited alongside Jacobs and Casey for the music in these productions. The revival was met with mixed critical reception.
- Cool Rider: Grease 2 was later adapted into a musical, albeit with an alternate title, with the script re-written and modified for the stage on Broadway and the West End. The Broadway production received positive critic reviews, favorably calling it superior over the film.

== Video games ==
A music party video game titled Grease was released for the Wii and Nintendo DS video game consoles in 2010.

Grease Dance, a rhythm dance game was released in 2011 for the PlayStation 3 and Xbox 360.

== See also ==
- Sha Na Na, syndicated television variety show first broadcast from 1977 to 1981
