= 1997 in animation =

1997 in animation is an overview of notable events, including notable awards, list of films released, television show debuts and endings, and notable deaths.

== Events ==
=== January ===
- January 7: The U.S. animation studio Frederator Studios is founded.
- January 12: The first episode of King of the Hill is broadcast.

=== February ===
- February 8: The final episode of the Sailor Moon, anime airs.
- February 9: The Simpsons episode "The Itchy & Scratchy & Poochie Show" is first broadcast, with the series breaking the record of The Flintstones as the longest-running U.S. primetime animated TV series.

=== March ===
- March 3: Daria, a spin-off series of Beavis and Butt-Head airs its first episode.
- March 15: Neon Genesis Evangelion: Death & Rebirth premieres, the first film in the Neon Genesis Evangelion series.
- March 24: 69th Academy Awards: Quest by Tyron Montgomery and Thomas Stellmach wins the Academy Award for Best Animated Short Film.
- March 26: Mark Dindal's Cats Don't Dance premieres.

=== April ===
- April 1:
  - As an April Fools' Day joke, Cartoon Network reruns Tex Avery's Screwy Squirrel cartoon Happy-Go-Nutty for 12 hours straight.
  - The Pokémon anime first airs in Japan.
- April 2: The first episode of Hikarian is broadcast.
- April 7: The first episode of The Kindaichi Case Files airs.
- April 17: The first episode of Blake and Mortimer, based on the eponymous comics series Blake and Mortimer by Edgar P. Jacobs, is broadcast.
- April 19: The first episode of The Angry Beavers airs.
- April 21: Matt Groening founded the animation production company The Curiosity Company, which would later produce Futurama.

=== May ===
- May 11: King of the Hill concludes its first season on Fox with the episode "Plastic White Female". The season's finale reeled in a total of over 13.2 million viewers that night.
- May 16: Todd McFarlane's Spawn, based on the comic series Spawn, is first broadcast.
- May 18: The Simpsons concludes its eighth season on Fox with the episode "The Secret War of Lisa Simpson".

=== June ===
- June 5: The Japanese animation studio Bee Train is founded.
- June 14: The first episode of The Adventures of Paddington Bear is broadcast, based on the eponymous children's book series.
- June 15: The Walt Disney Company releases Hercules, directed by Ron Clements and John Musker.

=== July ===
- July 12: Hayao Miyazaki's Princess Mononoke premieres. Now-former Miramax chairman Harvey Weinstein responded with the infamous "no-cuts" policy by Toshio Suzuki as Weinstein nearly gave up wanting to distribute the film for the United States release. He instead hired Neil Gaiman to work on the English dub for the film.
- July 14: The first episode of Johnny Bravo airs. Because of its infamy for frequent suggestive humor, it became an adult interest.
- July 15: The first episode of Cow and Chicken is broadcast. One of Cartoon Network's earliest queer coded animated programs.
- July 19: Hideaki Anno and Kazuya Tsurumaki's The End of Evangelion premieres.
- July 22: The first episode of I Am Weasel is broadcast.
- July 26: A Chinese Ghost Story: The Tsui Hark Animation premieres.

=== August ===
- August 5: The Peanuts special It Was My Best Birthday Ever, Charlie Brown released exclusively for VHS & VCD.
- August 13: The first episode of South Park premieres on Comedy Central. It marks the debut of Stan Marsh, Kyle Broflovski, his baby brother Ike, Eric Cartman, Kenny McCormick, Mr. Garrison, Wendy Testaburger, Butters Stotch, Bebe Stevens, Token Black, Liane Cartman, Officer Barbrady and Chef.
- August 24: The first episode of Franklin airs.
- August 31: The first episode of Space Goofs is broadcast.

=== September ===
- September 1: The first episode of 101 Dalmatians: The Series, produced by the Walt Disney Company, is broadcast.
- September 3: DIC Entertainment's The Wacky World of Tex Avery airs. It was brutally panned by critics, who declared it an "insult" to Tex Avery's legacy.
- September 5: The first episode of Kipper airs.
- September 8: Bill Plympton's I Married a Strange Person! premieres.
- September 13:
  - The first episode of Pepper Ann is broadcast.
  - The first episode of Recess, produced by the Walt Disney Company, is broadcast.
  - The first episode of Science Court (later renamed Squiggle Vision) is broadcast.
- September 15: The first episode of Caillou is broadcast in Canada. It was televised in the United States three years later. This cartoon received intense criticism for the titular character's negative behavior. It was described as "the world's most universally reviled children's program.", despite some positive reviews.
- September 21:
  - Season 9 of The Simpsons begins on Fox with the premiere of the episode "The City of New York vs. Homer Simpson". This episode was pulled off from syndication & streaming services years later due to it featuring the World Trade Center, which would end up being destroyed 4 years later.
  - Season 2 of King of the Hill begins on Fox with the premiere of the episode "How to Fire a Rifle Without Really Trying".
- September 28: The Simpsons episode "The Principal and the Pauper" is first broadcast, where Principal Skinner is revealed to be an impostor, an episode which will prove to be controversial among long-time fans. Many fans believed that this episode is when the show jumped the shark.
- September 29: The first episode of Noah's Island airs.

=== October ===
- October 13: The first episode of Fennec is broadcast.
- October 17:
  - Teletoon is launched in Canada.
  - The first episode of Ned's Newt is broadcast on Teletoon. The show would eventually air on Fox Kids in the United States in 1998.
- October 23: Milan Blažeković' Lapitch the Little Shoemaker premieres. This is Blažeković's third film produced from Croatia Film and the second to perceive the United States release.
- October 24: The first episode of Freaky Stories airs.
- October 26: The Simpsons' "Treehouse of Horror VIII" premieres on Fox.

=== November ===
- November 14: Don Bluth and Gary Goldman's Anastasia premieres. This marks Bluth's first well-regarded film since All Dogs Go to Heaven in 1989 and the only film to be at its best from Fox Animation Studios overall.
- November 18: Motion Painting No. 1 and Tulips Shall Grow are added to the National Film Registry.
- November 19: The final episode of Dragon Ball GT, airs ending an 11-year run of shows based on the Dragon Ball franchise until the premiere of Dragon Ball Super in 2015.
- November 22: Rugrats concludes its fourth season on Nickelodeon with the premiere of the episodes "Angelica Nose Best/The Pirate Light".
- November 28: The final episode of Beavis and Butt-Head is broadcast on MTV.

=== December ===
- December 2: Anime producer Yoshinobu Nishizaki is arrested for drug possession with 50g of stimulants, 7g of morphine, 9g of marijuana. While on bail he goes to the Philippines on his English-registered cruiser the Ocean Nine; returning to smuggle in an M16 with M203 grenade launcher, a Glock 17, and a large amount of ammunition.
- December 6: The final episode of Aaahh!!! Real Monsters airs.
- December 16: The airing of the Pokémon episode "Dennō Senshi Porygon" causes photosensitive epileptic seizures among more than 600 viewers in Japan, prompting the series to have a four-month hiatus.
- December 17: The South Park episode "Mr. Hankey, the Christmas Poo" first airs, in which Mr. Hankey, Mr. Mackey and Father Maxi make their debut.
- December 25: Adarna: The Mythical Bird premieres in the Philippines, becoming the first feature-length animated Filipino film.

=== Specific date unknown ===
- Hanna-Barbera closed its studio doors in Hollywood, California, one year after Time Warner purchased Turner Broadcasting System.
- Ray Nowland's Go to Hell!! premieres, an animated feature animated completely by one person.

== Awards ==
- Mainichi Film Award for Best Film: Princess Mononoke
- Japan Academy Prize for Picture of the Year: Princess Mononoke

== Films released ==
- January 10 - Deep Sea Fleet: Submarine 707 (Japan)
- January 24:
  - Alien from the Darkness (Japan)
  - The Quest for the Key to Heaven (Sweden)
- February 4 - VeggieTales: Very Silly Songs! (United States)
- February 11:
  - Droids: The Pirates and the Prince (United States and Canada)
  - Ewoks: The Haunted Village (United States and Canada)
  - Hercules (United States)
- February 18 - Underground Adventure (United States and Canada)
- March 6 - The Little Bastard (Germany)
- March 8:
  - Doraemon: Nobita and the Spiral City (Japan)
  - Jigoku Sensei Nūbē: Gozen 0 toki Nūbē Shisu (Japan)
- March 11 - Journey Beneath the Sea (United States and Canada)
- March 15:
  - The Dog of Flanders: The Movie (Japan)
  - Evangelion: Death and Rebirth (Japan)
- March 26:
  - Cats Don't Dance (United States)
  - Dragon Ball GT: A Hero's Legacy (Japan)
- March 28:
  - Mondo Plympton (United States)
  - Spy of Darkness (Japan)
- March 29 - Kikansha Sensei (Japan)
- April 8 - Mighty Ducks the Movie: The First Face-Off (United States)
- April 12 - Hermes – Winds of Love (Japan)
- April 19:
  - Case Closed: The Time-Bombed Skyscraper (Japan)
  - Crayon Shin-chan: Pursuit of the Balls of Darkness (Japan)
  - Tiny Heroes (Hungary, Germany, and United States)
- April 22 - VeggieTales: Larry-Boy! and the Fib from Outer Space! (United States)
- April 25 - City Hunter: The Motion Picture (Japan)
- May - Tom and Fluffy (Estonia)
- May 11 - Jiang de Kailaban jue (China and Germany)
- May 15 - The Count of Monte Cristo (Canada and United States)
- May 20:
  - Anastasia (United States and Japan)
  - The Brave Little Toaster to the Rescue (United States)
- May 21 - Psycho Diver: Soul Siren (Japan)
- June 23 - Lapitch the Little Shoemaker (Croatia and Germany)
- June 27 - Hercules (United States)
- July 5 - Elmer's Adventure: My Father's Dragon (Japan)
- July 10 - Dibu: The Movie (Argentina)
- July 12 - Princess Mononoke (Japan)
- July 13 - Beauty and the Beast (United States)
- July 18 - The Swan Princess: Escape from Castle Mountain (United States)
- July 19 - The End of Evangelion (Japan)
- July 22:
  - The Day the Earth Moved (Japan)
  - Fujimi Orchestra (Japan)
- July 26 - A Chinese Ghost Story: The Tsui Hark Animation (Hong Kong)
- July 28 - Soreike! Anpanman Niji no Piramiddo (Japan)
- August 1:
  - Jungle Emperor Leo (Japan)
  - Lupin III: Island of Assassins (Japan)
- August 2:
  - Slayers Great (Japan)
  - Tenchi the Movie 2: The Daughter of Darkness (Japan)
- August 5:
  - Perfect Blue (Japan)
  - Pooh's Grand Adventure: The Search for Christopher Robin (United States)
- August 22 - Pippi Longstocking (Sweden, Germany, and Canada)
- September 8 - I Married a Strange Person! (United States)
- September 12 - Licca-chan to Yamaneko Hoshi no Tabi (Japan)
- September 13:
  - Spur to Glory: The Igaya Chiharu Story (Japan)
  - The Ugly Duckling (United Kingdom)
- September 20 - Spacibo at the End of the Edo Period (Japan)
- October 2 - The Fearless Four (Germany, United States, and United Kingdom)
- October 4 - The Batman/Superman Movie: World's Finest (United States)
- October 11 - A Christmas Carol (United States)
- October 14 - Babes in Toyland (United States)
- October 21 - Annabelle's Wish (United States)
- October 25 - Kigyō Senshi Yamazaki: Long Distance Call (Japan)
- November 11:
  - Beauty and the Beast: The Enchanted Christmas (United States and Canada)
  - Twilight of the Dark Master (Japan)
- November 18 - VeggieTales: Josh and the Big Wall! (United States)
- November 21 - Anastasia (United States)
- December 4 - Benjamin Bluemchen (Germany and Luxembourg)
- December 9 - The Land Before Time V: The Mysterious Island (United States)
- December 25:
  - Adarna: The Mythical Bird (Philippines)
  - The Secret of Anastasia (United States)
- Specific date unknown:
  - Go to Hell!! (Australia)
  - Home of Acorns (Japan)
  - Hua Mulan (Italy)
  - Katharina & Witt, Fiction and Reality (Germany)
  - Megasónicos (Spain)
  - Merry Christmas Little Moonky! (Belgium and France)
  - Neznayka on the Moon (Russia)
  - The Perfume of the Invisible One (France and Italy)
  - Pocahontas and the Spider Woman (Italy)

== Television series debuts ==
Date	Title	Channel	Year
January 12	King of the Hill	Fox	1997–2010
March 3	Daria	MTV	1997–2002
April 19	Nightmare Ned	ABC	1997
April 19	The Angry Beavers	Nickelodeon	1997–2001
May 16	Todd McFarlane's Spawn	HBO	1997–1999
July 11	Spicy City	HBO	1997
July 14	Johnny Bravo	Cartoon Network	1997–2004
July 15	Cow and Chicken	Cartoon Network	1997–1999
July 15	I Am Weasel	Cartoon Network	1997–2000
August 13	South Park	Comedy Central	1997–present
August 31	Recess	ABC	1997–2001
September 1	101 Dalmatians: The Series	ABC, Syndication	1997–1998
September 1	Extreme Dinosaurs	Syndication	1997
September 1	Extreme Ghostbusters	Syndication	1997
September 3	The Wacky World of Tex Avery	Syndication	1997
September 6	Space Goofs	France 3	1997–2006
September 13	Pepper Ann	ABC, UPN	1997–2000
September 13	Science Court	ABC	1997–2000
September 13	The Legend of Calamity Jane	Kids' WB	1997
September 13	The New Batman Adventures	Kids' WB	1997–1999
September 13	The New Batman/Superman Adventures	Kids' WB	1997–2000
September 15	Mummies Alive!	Syndication	1997
September 20	The New Adventures of Zorro (1997)	Syndication	1997–1998
September 20	Van-Pires	Syndication	1997–1998
October 4	The Adventures of Sam & Max: Freelance Police	Fox Kids	1997–1998
October 11	Men in Black: The Series	Kids' WB	1997–2001
October 17	Ned's Newt	Teletoon Fox Kids	1997– 2000
October 20	Channel Umptee-3	Kids' WB	1997– 1998
November 4	Cartoon Sushi	MTV	1997–1998

== Television series endings ==
Date	Title	Channel	Year	Notes
January 17	Mighty Ducks: The Animated Series	ABC, Syndication	1996–1997	Cancelled
February 15	Gargoyles	Syndication, ABC	1994–1997	Cancelled
February 22	C Bear and Jamal	Fox Kids	1996–1997	Cancelled
February 22	Road Rovers	Kids' WB	1996–1997	Cancelled
April 4	Dragon Flyz	Syndication	1996–1997	Cancelled
April 16	The Real Adventures of Jonny Quest	Cartoon Network	1996–1997	Cancelled
May 17	Waynehead	Kids' WB	1996–1997	Cancelled
June 1	Freakazoid!	Kids' WB	1995–1997	Cancelled
August 1	Eek! The Cat	Fox Kids	1992–1997	Ended
August 9	Nightmare Ned	ABC	1997	Cancelled
August 22	Spicy City	HBO	1997	Cancelled
August 30	The Mask: Animated Series	CBS	1995–1997	Cancelled
September 6	Duckman	USA Network	1994–1997	Cancelled
September 8	Mr. Men and Little Miss	CITV	1995–1997	Ended
September 20	X-Men	Fox Kids	1992–1997	Ended
September 27	The Legend of Calamity Jane	Kids' WB	1997	Cancelled; remaining eps continued to air on Latin America and Europe countries until 1998.
November 16	Aaahh!!! Real Monsters	Nickelodeon	1994–1997	Cancelled
November 23	The Incredible Hulk (1996)	UPN	Cancelled	Cancelled
November 25	Mummies Alive!	Syndication	1997	Cancelled
November 28	Beavis and Butt-Head	MTV	1993–1997; 2011	Ended, but was revived in 2011.
November 28	What a Cartoon!	Cartoon Network	1995–1997	Cancelled
December 2	The Wacky World of Tex Avery	Syndication	1997	Cancelled
December 4	Extreme Ghostbusters	Syndication	1997	Cancelled
December 24	Extreme Dinosaurs	Syndication	1997	Cancelled

== Television season premieres ==
Date	Title	Season	Channel
January 26	Beavis and Butt-Head	7	MTV
July 16	Dexter's Laboratory	2	Cartoon Network
August 24	Aaahh!!! Real Monsters	4	Nickelodeon
September 6	Pinky and the Brain	3	Kids' WB (The WB)
September 8	Animaniacs	5	Kids' WB (The WB)
September 13	Doug	6	ABC
September 13	The Sylvester & Tweety Mysteries	3	Kids' WB (The WB)
September 21	King of the Hill	2	Fox
September 21	The Simpsons	9	Fox
September 22	Hey Arnold!	2	Nickelodeon

== Television season finales ==
Date	Title	Season	Channel
January 1	Dexter's Laboratory	1	Cartoon Network
February 12	Hey Arnold!	1	Nickelodeon
February 22	The Sylvester & Tweety Mysteries	2	Kids' WB (The WB)
March 8	Doug	5	ABC
May 11	King of the Hill	1	Fox
May 17	Pinky and the Brain	2	Kids' WB (The WB)
May 18	The Simpsons	8	Fox
September 28	The Angry Beavers	1	Nickelodeon
November 22	Doug	6	ABC
November 22	Rugrats	4	Nickelodeon
November 28	Beavis and Butt-Head	7 (Note: Was originally the final season of the show before it was revived for 8th season 14 years later.)	MTV
December 1	Hey Arnold!	2	Nickelodeon
December 15	Johnny Bravo	1	Cartoon Network

== Births ==
=== January ===
- January 7: Kyle Stanger, British actor (voice of Lumpy the Heffalump in the Winnie the Pooh franchise).
- January 21: Jeremy Shada, American actor, musician and singer (voice of Finn in the Adventure Time franchise, Jean Francois in Team America: World Police, young Robin in Batman: The Brave and the Bold, Pug in ParaNorman, Cody Maverick in Surf's Up 2: WaveMania, Lance in Voltron: Legendary Defender, Tom Kullersen in Dragons: The Nine Realms, Porridge in the Chowder episode "My Big Fat Stinky Wedding").
- January 24: Jonah Bobo, American actor (voice of Austin in The Backyardigans, Tod in The Fox and the Hound 2).

=== February ===
- February 10: Chloë Grace Moretz, American actress and model (voice of Darby in My Friends Tigger & Pooh, young Penny in Bolt, Snow White in Red Shoes and the Seven Dwarfs, Wednesday Addams in The Addams Family and The Addams Family 2, the title character in Nimona, Furi in The Emperor's New School episode "Kuzcogarten", Honey in the American Dad! episode "Steve & Snot's Test-Tubular Adventure", Boodles in the Mickey Mouse Clubhouse episode "Mickey's Monster Musical").
- February 11: Jenny Yokobori, American voice actress (voice of Dashi in Octonauts and the Caves of Sac Acturn and Octonauts and the Great Barrier Reef, Kuromi in Hello Kitty and Friends: Supercute Adventures, Jade Hunter and Ainsley Slater in Rainbow High, Laser Baby in The Boys Presents: Diabolical episode "Laser Baby's Day Out", Japanese Girl in the Central Park episode "Rival Busker", continued voice of Kumiko Albertson in The Simpsons).

=== March ===
- March 3: Nissae Isen, Canadian voice actress (voice of George in Miss BG, Ivy in Miss Spider's Sunny Patch Friends, Thor in Captain Flamingo, Jade in My Friend Rabbit, Yuri in My Big Big Friend, Trollee in Mike the Knight, Ayla Elephant in Babar and the Adventures of Badou, Juanita in the Atomic Betty episode "Takes One to Know One", adult D.W. Read in the Arthur episode "All Grown Up").
- March 18:
  - Ciara Bravo, American actress, singer, and comedian (voice of Giselita in Open Season).
  - Cary and Michael Huang (Jacknjellify), American twin online animators and YouTubers (Creators of Battle for Dream Island)
- March 30: Gideon Adlon, American actress (voice of Hayley Travis in Pacific Rim: The Black, ZaZa Royale in Battle Kitty, Dawn Marie in Slippin' Jimmy, Circle in Shape Island, Phantom Girl in Legion of Super-Heroes, Lydia in the Solar Opposites episode "The Matter Transfer Array").

=== April ===
- April 15: Maisie Williams, English actress (voice of Goona in Early Man, Cammie MacCloud in Gen:Lock).
- April 24: Marisa Davila, American actress (voice of Alex Rose in Super Giant Robot Brothers).

=== May ===
- May 11: Lana Condor, American actress, producer, and singer (voice of Kaoru in Rilakkuma and Kaoru, Casey McGarry in BoJack Horseman, Ruby Gillman in Ruby Gillman, Teenage Kraken).
- May 12: Odeya Rush, Israeli actress and model (voice of Samara in Pantheon).

=== July ===
- July 30: Finneas O'Connell, American singer, songwriter (Turning Red), record producer and actor (voice of Jesse in Turning Red, himself in The Simpsons short "When Billie Met Lisa").

=== August ===
- August 5: Olivia Holt, American actress (voice of Amber in Penn Zero: Part-Time Hero, Dagger in Spider-Man, Morgan in Tinker Bell and the Legend of the NeverBeast, Spider-Girl in the Ultimate Spider-Man episode "The Spider-Verse").
- August 16: Piper Curda, American actress (voice of Debby Kang in Randy Cunningham: 9th Grade Ninja, Mabel Tanaka in Hoppers).
- August 19: Marcello Hernández, American actor and comedian (voice of Fergus in Shrek 5).
- August 22: Jacob Dudman, English actor, writer and filmmaker (voice of Charles Darwin in the Primal episode "The Primal Theory", Eldred in the Unicorn: Warriors Eternal episode "The Awakening").
- August 23: Lil Yachty, American rapper (voice of Green Lantern in Teen Titans Go! To the Movies).
- August 25: Bryana Salaz, American actress and singer (voice of Anga in The Lion Guard, Teenage Meteora Butterfly in the Star vs. the Forces of Evil episode "Gone Baby Gone").

=== September ===
- September 27: Jaiden Animations (Jaiden Dittfach), American online animator, cartoonist and YouTuber.

=== October ===
- October 6: Michael J. Woodard, American singer and actor (voice of Arlo Beauregard in Arlo the Alligator Boy and I Heart Arlo).
- October 7: Kira Kosarin, American actress and singer (voice of Shannon in Lucky).
- October 10: Grace Rolek, American actress (voice of Connie Maheswaran in the Steven Universe franchise, Louise in Lou and Lou: Safety Patrol, Molly in the Special Agent Oso episode "Gold Flower").
- October 23: Zach Callison, American actor (voice of the title character in the Steven Universe franchise, Prince James in Sofia the First, Zuzz in Cleopatra in Space, King Tut in Mr. Peabody & Sherman, Billy Batson in Superman/Shazam!: The Return of Black Adam, Justice League: War, Lego DC Batman: Family Matters and Lego DC Shazam! Magic and Monsters).
- October 26: Rhenzy Feliz, American actor (voice of Camilo Madrigal in Encanto).

=== November ===
- November 1: Max Burkholder, American actor (voice of various characters in Family Guy, Blue Teammate #6 in The Ant Bully, Timmy Tibble in Arthur's Missing Pal, Roo in My Friends Tigger & Pooh, Kid Doctor and Little Boy in American Dad!, Mom's Maggot in Fly Me to the Moon, Chomper in The Land Before Time, Billy in Astro Boy, Kid, Harry Potter, Justin Bieber and Pudgy Kid in The Cleveland Show, the title character in the Random! Cartoons episode "Samsquatch", Billy Connors in The Spectacular Spider-Man episode "Natural Selection", World in the Foster's Home for Imaginary Friends episode "Destination: Imagination").

=== December ===
- December 15: Maude Apatow, American actress (voice of Justine in Pantheon).
- December 16: Spence Moore II, American actor (voice of George The Tiger in My Father's Dragon).

== Deaths ==
=== January ===
- January 1: Al Eugster, American animator (Fleischer Studios, Ub Iwerks, Walt Disney Productions, Famous Studios), dies at age 87.
- January 8: Normand Hudon, Canadian animator and comics artist (Au P'tit Café), dies at age 67.
- January 10: Sheldon Leonard, American actor (voice of Dodsworth in Kiddin' the Kitten and A Peck o' Trouble, Kid Banty in Sock-a-Doodle-Do, the title character in Linus the Lionhearted), dies at age 89.
- January 11: Ed DeMattia, American animator (Hanna-Barbera, Captain America, Here Comes the Grump, The Pink Panther Show, The Phantom Tollbooth, Filmation, Alvin and the Chipmunks, The Simpsons, Tiny Toon Adventures, James Bond Jr.), dies at an unknown age.
- January 18: Adriana Caselotti, American actress and singer (voice of the title character in Snow White and the Seven Dwarfs), dies at age 80.

=== February ===
- February 6: Ernie Anderson, American radio and television personality, horror host, and announcer (narrated Jayce and the Wheeled Warriors, The Adventures of Super Mario Bros. 3, 2 episodes of Animaniacs, The Powerpuff Girls shorts for The What A Cartoon Show!), dies at age 73.
- February 8: Robert Ridgely, American voice actor (voice of the Purple Pie Man in Strawberry Shortcake, the title character in Thundarr the Barbarian, Mr. Kelp in Snorks, Rex Charger in Centurions, Al Vermin in Bonkers, and the Commander in Dexter's Laboratory), dies at 65.
- February 26:
  - David Doyle, American actor (voice of Sheriff Gomer Cleghorn in the TaleSpin episode "Citizen Khan", Professor Hubert in the Road Rovers episode "A Hair of the Dog That Bit You", Sam Delaney in the Mighty Ducks: The Animated Series episode "The Human Factor", first voice of Lou Pickles in Rugrats), dies at age 67.
  - Andy Houts, American actor (voice of McGrew, Bucky, Oodles, Wuggles in Rugrats, Snill and Butch in AAAHH!!! Real Monsters), animator (Aaahh!!! Real Monsters, Duckman), and writer (Rugrats), dies at 31.
- February 27: Harry Love, American animator and production coordinator (Charles Mintz, Warner Bros. Cartoons, DePatie-Freleng, The Nine Lives of Fritz the Cat), dies at age 85.

=== March ===
- March 22: Les Kline, American animator (worked for Walter Lantz on many Woody Woodpecker, Chilly Willy, and Oswald the Lucky Rabbit cartoons, and was Lantzʼs longest serving employee, working from 1929 to 1971, with a small gap in the early 50s), dies at age 90.
- March 31: Jon Stone, American writer, producer, and director (Sesame Street), dies at age 65.

=== April ===
- April 16: Roland Topor, French novelist, illustrator, cartoonist, comics artist, film script writer, TV script writer, animator and playwright (Les Escargots, Fantastic Planet), dies at age 59.
- April 20: Stamatis L. Polenakis, Greek comic artist and animated film director (O Ntoútse afigeítai, translated as The Duce Narrates), dies at age 88 or 89.

=== May ===
- May 4: Alvy Moore, American actor (voice of Grandpa Little in The Littles), dies at age 75.
- May 18: Phyllis Craig, American animator (Walt Disney Animation Studios, Hanna-Barbera) and ink and paint supervisor (Film Roman), dies at age 68.
- May 25: Peter Rangmar, Swedish comedian and actor (dub voice of Timon in The Lion King), dies at age 40.
- May 29: George Fenneman, American announcer (voice of the narrator in The Simpsons episode "Marge on the Lam"), dies from emphysema at age 77.

=== June ===
- June 24: Brian Keith, American actor (voice of Uncle Ben in Spider-Man, Duckman's Father in the Duckman episode "Kidney, Popsicle, and Nuts"), commits suicide at age 75.
- June 29: William Hickey, American actor (voice of Dr. Finklestein in The Nightmare Before Christmas), dies at age 69.

=== July ===
- July 2: James Stewart, American actor (voice of Wylie Burp in An American Tail: Fievel Goes West), dies at age 89.

=== August ===
- August 27: Dick N. Lucas, American animator (Walt Disney Company), dies at age 77.

=== September ===
- September 6: Bianca Majolie, Italian-American story artist, animator, concept artist and writer (Walt Disney Company), dies at age 96.
- September 9: Burgess Meredith, American actor (voice of Puff the Magic Dragon in a series of TV specials, Golobulus in G.I. Joe: The Movie), dies at age 89.

=== October ===
- October 7: Wan Laiming, Chinese animator and film director (founder of the Shanghai Animation Film Studio, Shuzhendong Chinese Typewriter, Uproar in the Studio, The Camel's Dance, Princess Iron Fan, Havoc in Heaven, Why is the Crow Black-Coated), dies at age 97.
- October 18: Milt Neil, American comics artist and animator (The Walt Disney Company, Walter Lantz), dies at age 83.
- October 22:
  - Per Lygum, Danish animator and comics artist (worked for the animation department of Marten Toonder, directed 1980s Christmas TV commercial for Tuborg Beer), dies at age 64.
  - Leonid Amalrik, Russian animator (Black and White, The Grey Neck, Thumbelina), dies at age 92.
- October 24: Don Messick, American voice actor (voice of Boo-Boo Bear and Ranger Smith in Yogi Bear, Benton Quest in Jonny Quest, Bamm-Bamm Rubble in The Flintstones, Astro in The Jetsons, Muttley in Wacky Races and Dastardly and Muttley in Their Flying Machines, the title character in the Scooby-Doo franchise, Dr. Vernon Danger in the Freakazoid! episode Toby Danger in Doomsday Bet), dies at age 71.
- October 25: Tina Lattanzi, Italian voice actress (provided the Italian voices of the Evil Queen in Snow White and the Seven Dwarfs, Lady Tremaine in Cinderella, the Queen of Hearts in Alice in Wonderland, and Maleficent in Sleeping Beauty), dies at age 99.

=== November ===
- November 12: Chang Yu-sheng, Taiwanese musician, actor, and comedian (dub voice of teenage Hercules in Hercules), dies at age 31.

=== December ===
- December 6: Eliot Daniel, American songwriter (Walt Disney Company), dies at age 89.
- December 16: Lillian Disney, American ink artist (Walt Disney Animation Studios), and widow of Walt Disney, dies at age 98.

=== Specific date unknown ===
- Frank Little, American animator and comics artist (Terrytoons), dies at age 90.

== See also ==
- 1997 in anime
