= Penny Dreadful: City of Angels =

2020 American historical dark fantasy television series

- Genre: Dark fantasy; Historical fantasy; Gothic horror; Thriller; Drama
- Created by: John Logan
- Written by: John Logan; Colin Liddle; José Rivera; Tatiana Suarez-Pico; Vinnie Wilhelm
- Directed by: Paco Cabezas; Roxann Dawson; Sheree Folkson; Sergio Mimica-Gezzan; Dan Attias; Richard J. Lewis
- Starring: Natalie Dormer; Daniel Zovatto; Kerry Bishé; Adriana Barraza; Jessica Garza; Michael Gladis; Johnathan Nieves; Rory Kinnear; Nathan Lane
- Composer: John Paesano
- Country of origin: United States
- Original language: English
- No. of seasons: 1
- No. of episodes: 10

Production
- Executive producers: Michael Aguilar; Pippa Harris; Sam Mendes; John Logan
- Producer: Paco Cabezas
- Production locations: Los Angeles, California
- Cinematography: John Conroy; Pedro Luque
- Editors: Tad Dennis; Iain Erskine; Victor Du Bois; Benjamin Howdeshell
- Camera setup: Single-camera
- Running time: 53–68 minutes
- Production companies: Desert Wolf Productions; Neal Street Productions
- Budget: $98 million

Original release
- Network: Showtime
- Release: April 26 – June 28, 2020

Related
- Penny Dreadful

Penny Dreadful: City of Angels is an American historical dark fantasy television series created by John Logan that premiered on Showtime on April 26, 2020. The series stars Natalie Dormer, Daniel Zovatto, Kerry Bishé, Adriana Barraza, Jessica Garza, Michael Gladis, Johnathan Nieves, Rory Kinnear, and Nathan Lane. The series follows two detectives (Zovatto and Lane) as they investigate a murder in Los Angeles. A spin-off of the series Penny Dreadful, City of Angels was ordered in November 2018 and is set in Los Angeles, California, in 1938.

The first season concluded on June 28, 2020; the series was canceled in August 2020. Dormer was nominated for Best Actress in a Horror Series at the 1st Critics' Choice Super Awards for her performance.

== Premise ==
Penny Dreadful: City of Angels is set nearly 50 years after the original series, during the Golden Age of Hollywood in the 1930s. It takes place in 1938 Los Angeles, a time and place "deeply infused with Mexican-American folklore and social tension". The characters are connected in a conflict between the Mexican folklore deity, Santa Muerte, the caretaker of the dead and guide to the great beyond, and her spiritual sister, the demoness Magda, who believes mankind is inherently evil and aims to prove her point. Detective Tiago Vega and his partner, veteran Detective Lewis Michener, are tasked with a gruesome murder case and soon become embroiled in Los Angeles's history as well as its present, while racial tensions, the looming threat of war, and Nazi conspiracies threaten to derail them at every turn.

== Cast ==
=== Main ===
- Natalie Dormer as Magda, a demon who can take various forms. Magda's personas include:
  - Alex Malone (born Mahler), City Councilman Townsend's political aide with an alleged secret past as a German Jew who pushes him to collaborate with the Nazis.
  - Elsa Branson, a German housewife who seduces Peter Craft. Her son Frank is also one of Magda's personas.
  - Rio, an influential member of the pachuco gang in Los Angeles who begins a polyamorous relationship with Fly Rico and Mateo.
- Daniel Zovatto as Tiago Vega, the first Mexican-American detective of the Los Angeles Police Department (LAPD). Guest actor Evan Whitten portrays Tiago as a child.
- Kerry Bishé as Molly Finnister, a charismatic radio evangelist who is known as "Sister Molly"
- Adriana Barraza as Maria Vega, the matriarch of the Vega family
- Jessica Garza as Josefina Vega, the youngest child of the Vega family
- Michael Gladis as Charlton Townsend, a councilman and head of the Los Angeles City Council's Transportation Committee
- Johnathan Nieves as Mateo Vega, Tiago's younger brother
- Rory Kinnear as Peter Craft (born Krupp), a German pediatrician and the head of the local German-American Bund. Craft's true background is the German family Krupp, famous for their production of weapons.
- Nathan Lane as Lewis Michener, a veteran LAPD officer and Vega's partner

=== Recurring ===
- Santino Barnard as Frank Branson, Elsa's son who is also one of Magda's personas
- Sebastian Chacon as Fly Rico, a dashing pachuco and a friend of Mateo's
- Christine Estabrook as Beverly Beck, a member of the Los Angeles City Council who despises Townsend
- Julian Hilliard as Tom Craft, Peter's son
- Lorenza Izzo as Santa Muerte, a deity associated with healing, protection, and safe delivery to the afterlife by her devotees
- Rod McLachlan as Jimmy Reilly, a racist, sadistic LAPD officer who routinely assaults Mexican-American citizens
- Ethan Peck as Hermann Ackermann, second-in-command of the German-American Bund
- Piper Perabo as Linda Craft, Peter's wife
- Adan Rocha as Diego Lopez, a pachuco
- Adam Rodriguez as Raul Vega, Tiago's older brother
- Dominic Sherwood as Kurt, Richard Goss's chauffeur who starts dating Townsend on Goss's orders
- Brent Spiner as Ned Vanderhoff, an LAPD captain and Vega and Michener's boss
- Hudson West as Trevor Craft, Peter's son
- Thomas Kretschmann as Richard Goss, a German architect and an operative of the Third Reich
- Stephanie Arcila as Bernadette Romero, a pachuco
- Scott Beehner as Frank Murphy, a detective
- Kyle McArthur as Brian Koenig, an intelligent student working for the Nazis to design a better V2 rocket engine
- Lin Shaye as Dottie Minter, a friend to Michener
- Amy Madigan as Adelaide Finnister, Molly's mother and manager
- Brad Garrett as Benny Berman, a Jewish mobster from New York City who works with Meyer Lansky

=== Guest ===
- Holger Moncada Jr. as Jose Vega, Tiago's father
- Richard Kind as Sam Bloom, a friend of Lewis's
- Bill Smitrovich as Anton Chevic, a friend of Lewis's
- Patti LuPone as a vocalist, singing at a secret gay club
- Brian Dennehy as Jerome Townsend, Charlton's father

== Episodes ==
No.	Title	Directed by	Written by	Original release date	U.S. viewers (millions)
1	"Santa Muerte"	Paco Cabezas	John Logan	April 26, 2020 (Note: "Santa Muerte" was first released online and on demand by Showtime on April 23, 2020, ahead of its broadcast on television.)	0.448
Tiago Vega is the LAPD's first Chicano detective. With his partner, Jewish veteran cop Lewis Michener, they investigate a grisly murder that seems to implicate Mexicans. Tiago's activist brother Raul battles ambitious Councilman Charlton Townsend over the construction of California's first freeway. Meanwhile, physician Peter Craft becomes more disillusioned with American life and devotes himself to his activities as the head of the local German American Bund. Tiago and Raul find themselves on opposite sides of a protest for Belvedere Heights which turns deadly thanks to Magda's machinations.
2	"Dead People Lie Down"	Paco Cabezas	John Logan	May 3, 2020	0.318
Vega and Michener deal with the fallout of the expressway riot and continue their investigation into the deaths of the Hazlett family. Magda continues to spin her web, convincing Townsend to use the death of a young police officer as a political tool to advance his agenda, and also manipulating Craft in her Elsa form. Vega and Michener attempt to gain information about James Hazlett and the Joyful Voices Ministry he worked for, but are stonewalled by Adelaide Finnister, the mother of the church's primary attraction. Michener and his friends Dottie, Sam, and Anton trail the Nazis, with deadly consequences. Mateo receives an invitation to join a pachuco gang, while Maria's prayers to Santa Muerte produce eerie results.
3	"Wicked Old World"	Sergio Mimica-Gezzan	John Logan	May 10, 2020	0.352
Michener begins an investigation into Sam and Anton's deaths. Raul wakes in the hospital, and confesses he has no recollection of the riot. Councilman Townsend has wrenches thrown into his plan to build the expressway, which culminates in a disastrous meeting with the Germans. Michener interrogates the young boy seen dining with the Nazis, while Tiago and Molly talk and strike up a romance at Santa Monica Pier. Craft begins an affair with Elsa, inviting her to join his circle of German friends. Mateo goes to the Crimson Cat and meets up with Rico and Rio, another of Magda's personalities. The police crash the dance due to a racially-restrictive curfew, and Mateo witnesses Rico and Rio arguing about how best to fight back. Tiago meets Michener at a bar, where he learns that Hazlett had sex with Molly. Tiago does not believe Michener, who instructs him to take his case files and look at them himself. Townsend later has a sexual encounter with a man, and Mateo gets his pachuco tattoo.
4	"Josefina and the Holy Spirit"	Sergio Mimica-Gezzan	John Logan	May 17, 2020	0.308
Santa Muerte witnesses a gang hit in Mexico. In Los Angeles, Tiago catches Reilly beating Diego at the precinct and intervenes, before being stopped by Vanderhoff and sent back to work on the Hazlett case. Councilwoman Beck keeps complicating Townsend's freeway plans. Elsa and Peter continue their affair while Frank causes disquiet among the children. Tiago goes to Hazlett's beach home, and has a confrontation with a conflicted Molly. Michener tries to convince Jewish mobster Benny Berman to join his cause, to no avail. Mateo and Josefina are hassled by a gang of cops, and Reilly sexually assaults Josefina. Mateo's family discover his pachuco tattoo. Josefina seeks solace at Joyful Voices and witnesses a changed Molly. Berman kidnaps Michener and reveals that the attack in Mexico was committed by someone from his gang, who hijacked weapons intended for Zionist rebels and sold them to the Nazis Michener is hunting. Berman kills the turncoat when Michener refuses. Mateo and the pachucos confront Reilly, whom Mateo brutally murders. They dump Reilly's body outside the police station. Tiago visits Molly late at night in the Joyful Voices kitchen, and she quietly hands him a plate.
5	"Children of the Royal Sun"	Roxann Dawson	José Rivera	May 24, 2020	0.369
Elsa, Mateo, and Tiago each have their own sexual encounters. Tiago returns to a suspicious Lewis and a city on the brink of race war. Josefina meets with Molly, who reveals her own experience with sexual assault, and Molly realizes that Josefina is Tiago's sister. While investigating Reilly's death, Tiago gets increasingly combative when he suspects Mateo of the killing. Dottie meets with the young rocket scientist, while a familiar face watches nearby. Michener meets Santa Muerte. Elsa murders a man she kidnapped, calling on Craft to dispose of the body. Townsend has a date. Michener and Tiago pursue the pachucos, but only corral Diego. Tiago corners Mateo in an alley where he confesses to Reilly's murder, before being told to run by Tiago.
6	"How It Is with Brothers"	Roxann Dawson	Vinnie Wilhelm	May 31, 2020	0.348
Michener and Vega bring Diego into the station house, and battle Reilly's goons for the right to question him first. Sister Molly has a confrontation with her mother that comes to a head on stage that night. Tiago grows more testy towards Diego when he hints that Mateo performed the killing. Townsend and Kurt discuss their backgrounds and their feelings about Los Angeles, while Peter has his wife committed to a sanitarium. Maria visits the pachuco safehouse, where she is rebuffed by Mateo. After Diego tells a story that hints at a complicit brother, Tiago snaps and threatens him with his gun. Michener realizes that Mateo killed Reilly, and convinces Diego to confess to that killing as well as the Hazlett case, saying that he will be a community hero and a legend in San Quentin, rather than a rat. The department then toasts to an unamused Vega and Michener.
7	"Maria and the Beast"	Sheree Folkson	Colin S. Liddle	June 7, 2020	0.360
Diego has confessed to the Hazlett murders and Reilly's killing. Molly and Tiago continue their romance. Elsa and Frank move into the Craft household, to the Craft boys' dismay. Michener crashes Brian's meeting with Dottie and places him in hiding because he lies about his Nazi meetings. Josefina becomes enthusiastic about her new faith, brushing off Mateo and alienating Maria in the process. Councilwoman Beck launches a recall campaign against Townsend. Michener enlists Tiago in his Nazi-hunting as a way of quid pro quo for convincing Diego to confess in place of Mateo, where they discover that Townsend and Molly's mother are in league with the Nazis. Maria summons Santa Muerte and confronts her about Magda's interference. Magda herself arrives and berates her sister, before trying to convince a stalwart Maria to swear fealty to her.
8	"Hide and Seek"	Sheree Folkson	Tatiana Suarez-Pico	June 14, 2020	0.289
Trevor buries his hamster, insisting that Frank killed him. Townsend confronts Beck, who hints that she is aware of his homosexuality. Josefina reveals to Maria that she is planning to move into the dormitory at Joyful Voices. Craft visits his wife in the sanitarium, where she vows to divorce him and tear his life apart. Mateo tries to return to his family, but is stopped by Rio. Tiago visits Adelaide to inquire about her connection to Goss, and discovers his sister's relationship with Molly. Kurt and Townsend go dancing at a secret club, and Townsend implores him to kill Beck, but he refuses. Maria has an unsettling conversation with Frank, while Craft takes a stance against hardliners within the Bund. Molly visits Tiago, where they have a confrontation about her guidance for Josefina, before making up. Craft reveals his true identity. Maria has a troubling vision, and Frank hurts himself in order to get Maria fired. Elsa insists that Peter dismiss Maria, but Craft defies her and promises Maria a raise. Michener and Tiago plan to break into the Via Hermosa offices, but an unseen gunman opens fire on them.
9	"Sing, Sing, Sing"	Dan Attias	John Logan	June 21, 2020	0.380
Vega and Michener deduce the Nazis were responsible for shooting them. Craft and Elsa make plans to make their children happy, while Townsend grows despondent over Beck's successes. Michener confronts Goss at a racially-restricted club, daring Goss to kill him. Townsend appeals to his influential father for support, but he refuses to support the motorway because of his investments in air travel infrastructure. Michener seeks Benny Berman's help again, who helps foil Kurt's plan to kill Dottie and kidnap Brian. The Vega family, Sister Molly, and the pachucos have a tense encounter in the Crimson Cat. Elsewhere, Reilly's cronies lynch Diego while a helpless Michener watches. Notes: This episode is dedicated to the memory of Brian Dennehy. This is the only episode to feature an additional warning that some of the content may be disturbing to some viewers.
10	"Day of the Dead"	Richard J. Lewis	John Logan	June 28, 2020	0.307
Santa Muerte appears in the Crimson Cat as Lewis arrives to warn Tiago of Diego's lynching. Fly Rico attempts to keep the peace, while Rio advocates violence. Frank causes Peter to accidentally hit a passing Chicano with his car, which sparks a violent riot between Chicanos and local sailors. Rio stabs Fly Rico and passes leadership of the gang to Mateo. Tiago and Molly question their relationship while Townsend celebrates the passage of martial law. Elsa implores Peter to become a true Nazi. Tiago reacts negatively to Berman hiding Brian at his family's house, while Adelaide reveals that she had the Hazlett family killed for fear of derailing Molly's career. Brian divulges that he has begun work on an atom bomb, and is killed by Michener. Molly has a vision of Santa Muerte before slitting her wrists in the ministry pool. Craft dons an Iron Cross medal and tearfully gives a Nazi salute. The Vega family celebrates Dia de Muertos before the demolition of Belvedere Heights. Michener and Vega vow to take revenge on Townsend, Goss, Adelaide, and Kurt.

== Production ==
Filming began in August 2019 in Los Angeles. Paco Cabezas directed the first and second episodes after previously directing four episodes, including the series finale, of Penny Dreadful. On January 13, 2020, it was announced that the series would premiere on April 26, 2020. On August 21, 2020, Showtime canceled the series after one season.

== Reception ==
=== Critical response ===
On Rotten Tomatoes, the series has an approval rating of 74% based on 35 reviews, with an average rating of 6.7/10. The website's critical consensus is, "Though City of Angels' host of interesting characters would be better served if there were fewer of them, twisty plotting and superb performances are bound to satisfy Penny Dreadful devotees." On Metacritic, it has a weighted average score of 60 out of 100, based on 16 critics, indicating "mixed or average reviews".

Danette Chavez of The A.V. Club gave the season a mixed review, writing that the show was ineffective across the genres it tried to portray. "Specificity," wrote Chavez, "along with cohesion, was missing all season. The maps that inspired City of Angels offered [producer John Logan] a way in, but not a clear path through this hodgepodge of genres and topics."

=== Ratings ===
Viewership and ratings per episode of Penny Dreadful: City of Angels
No.	Title	Air date	Rating (18–49)	Viewers (millions)	DVR viewers (millions)	Total viewers (millions)
1	"Santa Muerte"	April 26, 2020	0.04	0.448	0.359	0.807
2	"Dead People Lie Down"	May 3, 2020	0.04	0.318	—N/a	—N/a
3	"Wicked Old World"	May 10, 2020	0.04	0.352	0.345	0.697
4	"Josephina and the Holy Spirit"	May 17, 2020	0.04	0.308	0.392	0.700
5	"Children of the Royal Sun"	May 24, 2020	0.03	0.369	0.405	0.774
6	"How It Is with Brothers"	May 31, 2020	0.01	0.348	0.324	0.672
7	"Maria and the Beast"	June 7, 2020	0.03	0.360	0.404	0.764
8	"Hide and Seek"	June 14, 2020	0.02	0.289	0.322	0.611
9	"Sing, Sing, Sing"	June 21, 2020	0.04	0.380	0.386	0.766
10	"Day of the Dead"	June 28, 2020	0.02	0.307	0.352	0.659
