= Johnathan Nieves =

American actor (born 1997)

- Born: June 1, 1997 (age 28); Chicago, Illinois, U.S.
- Occupation: Actor
- Years active: 2015–present

Johnathan Nieves (born June 1, 1997) is an American actor. He is best known for playing Mateo Vega in Penny Dreadful: City of Angels (2020), and Richie Valdovinos in the musical TV series Grease: Rise of the Pink Ladies in 2023.

== Early life ==
Nieves was born and raised in Chicago, Illinois, U.S. He studied improv at The Second City Conservatory and the Chicago Actors Studio.

== Career ==
=== Film and television ===
In 2015, Nieves made his screen debut in an episode of Chicago Fire, followed in 2016 with an appearance in an episode of Shameless. In 2018, he guest-starred as Javier Pagan in New Amsterdam, and as David in season 4 of Better Call Saul, alongside Bob Odenkirk and Jonathan Banks. In 2019, he starred as Eduardo in the Stefon Bristol directed sci-fi film See You Yesterday, in a cast which included Michael J. Fox and the rapper Astro. The same year he played Hunter Martinez in an episode of the medical series Grey's Anatomy.

In 2020, he secured a main role, playing Mateo Vega in the American historical dark fantasy television series Penny Dreadful: City of Angels, working alongside Natalie Dormer and Rory Kinnear.

In 2023, Nieves played the main role of Richie Valdovinos brother of Olivia, and leader of the gang ‘T-Birds’, in the Paramount+ American musical romantic comedy television series Grease: Rise of the Pink Ladies, which is a prequel to the 1978 film Grease.

In 2025, he was part of the military show "Boots".

=== Theatre ===
Theatrical performances include:

- Sycamore (Raven Theatre, Chicago)
- How We Got On (Haven Theatre),
- Compass (Steppenwolf Theatre Company),
- Jesus Hopped the 'A' Train (Eclipse Theatre)
- I <3 Juliet (Q Brothers/Sketchbook Festival),
- Yellow Eyes (Visión Latino Theatre Company);
- My Mañana Comes (Teatro Vista, Chicago)
- Balm in Gilead (Griffin Theatre),
- The Taming of the Shrew (Oak Park Festival Theatre),
- In The Heights, (The Center Theatre),
- Fame (Steppenwolf theatre)
- Dark Play or Short Stories (Steppenwolf theatre)
- She Like Girls (Steppenwolf theatre)
- Pride & Prejudice (Steppenwolf theatre)
- Macbeth (Steppenwolf theatre)
- Cabaret (Actors Training Center)

== Filmography ==
=== Television and film ===
| Year | Title | Role | Notes /ref, |
|---|---|---|---|
| 2015 | Chicago Fire | Bloody Nose | TV Series |
| 2016 | Shameless | Miguel | 1 episode |
| 2017 | Portrait of a Young Woman | Oscar | Short film |
| 2017 | Neighborhood Food Drive | Cyclist | Film |
| 2018 | New Amsterdam | Javier Pagan | 1 episode |
| 2018 | Better Call Saul | David | 1 episode |
| 2019 | See You Yesterday | Eduardo | Film |
| 2019 | Grey's Anatomy | Hunter Martinez | 1 episode |
| 2020 | Penny Dreadful: City of Angels | Mateo Vega | Main role - 10 episodes |
| 2023 | Grease: Rise of the Pink Ladies | Richie Valdovinos | Main role - 8 episodes |
| 2025 | Boots | Eduardo Ochoa | Recurring role - 5 episodes |
