= 1997 in anime =

The events of 1997 in anime.

== Accolades ==
- Animation Film Award: Princess Mononoke

== Releases ==
English name	Japanese name	Type	Demographic	Regions
Agent Aika	アイカ (AIKa)	OVA		Japan
Alien from the Darkness	淫獣エイリアン (Injū Alien)	OVA		
Anime Ganbare Goemon	アニメがんばれゴエモン	TV		Japan
Armitage III: Poly-Matrix	アミテージ POLY-MATRIX (Amitēji Pori Matorikkusu)	Movie		
Battle Athletes	バトルアスリーテス大運動会 (Batoru Asurītesu Daiundōkai)	OVA		
Battle Athletes Victory	バトルアスリーテス大運動会 (Batoru Asurītesu Daiundōkai)	TV		
Berserk	剣風伝奇ベルセルク (Kenpū Denki Beruseruku)	TV		
Case Closed: The Time-Bombed Skyscraper	名探偵コナン 時計じかけの摩天楼 (Meitantei Konan: Tokei Jikake no Matenrō)	Movie		
City Hunter: The Motion Picture	シティーハンタースペシャル グッド・バイ・マイ・スイート・ハート	TV		
Clamp School Detectives	CLAMP学園探偵団 (Kuranpu Gakuen Tanteidan)	TV		
The Crayon Kingdom of Dreams	夢のクレヨン王国 (Yume no Kureyon Ōkoku)	TV		
Crayon Shin-chan: Pursuit of the Balls of Darkness	クレヨンしんちゃん 暗黒タマタマ大追跡 (Kureyon Shinchan: Ankoku Tamatama Daitsuiseki)	Movie		
Cutie Honey Flash	キューティーハニー フラッシュ (Kyūtī Hanī Furasshu)	TV		
The Day the Earth Moved	地球が動いた日 (Chikyū ga Ugoita Hi)	Movie		
Deep Sea Fleet: Submarine 707	深海の艦隊 サブマリン707 (Sinkai no Kantai Sabumarin Nana Maru Nana)	OVA		
Detatoko Princess	でたとこプリンセス (Detatoko Purinsesu)	OVA		
Doraemon: Nobita and the Spiral City	ドラえもん のび太のねじ巻き都市冒険記 (Doraemon: Nobita no Neji maki Shitī Bôkenki)	Movie		Japan
Doctor Slump	Dr.スランプ (Dokutā Suranpu)	TV		
Dragon Ball GT: A Hero's Legacy	ドラゴンボールGT 悟空外伝! 勇気の証しは四星球 (Doragon Bōru Jī Tī: Gokū Gaiden! Yūki no Akashi wa Sūshinchū)	TV		
Eat-Man	イートマン (EAT-MAN)	TV		
Elmer's Adventure: My Father's Dragon	エルマーの冒険 MY FATHER'S DRAGON (Erumā no Bōken Mai Fāzāsu Doragon)	Movie		
The End of Evangelion	新世紀エヴァンゲリオン劇場版 Air/まごころを、君に (Shin Seiki Evangerion Gekijō-ban: Ea/Magokoro o, Kimi ni)	Movie		
The File of Young Kindaichi	金田一少年の事件簿 (Kindaichi Shōnen no Jikenbo)	TV		
Flame of Recca	烈火の炎 (Rekka no Honō)	TV		
Fujimi Orchestra	富士見二丁目交響楽団 (Fujimi Nichōme Kōkyō Gakudan)	OVA		
Hakugei: Legend of the Moby Dick	白鯨伝説 (Hakugei Densetsu)	TV		
Hermes – Winds of Love	ヘルメス－愛は風の如く (Hermes – Ai Wa Kaze No Gotoku)	OVA		
Home of Acorns	どんぐりの家 (Donguri no Ie)	Movie		Japan
Hyper Police	はいぱーぽりす (Haipā Porisu)	TV		
In the Beginning: The Bible Stories	手塚治虫の旧約聖書物語 (Tezuka Osamu no Kyūyaku Seisho Monogatari)	TV		
Jigoku Sensei Nūbē: Gozen 0 toki Nūbē Shisu	地獄先生ぬ～べ～ 午前0時ぬ～べ～死す (Hell Teacher Nūbē: 0 a.m. Nube Dead)	Movie		
Jungle de Ikou!	ジャングルDEいこう! (Janguru de Ikō!)	OVA		
Jungle Emperor Leo	劇場版 ジャングル大帝 (Gekijōban Janguru Taitei)	Movie		
Kigyō Senshi Yamazaki: Long Distance Call	企業戦士YAMAZAKI ~LONG DISTANCE CALL~ (Corporate Warrior Yamazaki: Long Distance Call)	OVA		
Knights of Ramune	VS騎士ラムネ&40FRESH (Bāsasu Naito Ramune ando Fōtī Furesshu)	OVA		
Let's & Go!! The Movie: Tamiya	爆走兄弟レッツ&ゴー!!WGP 暴走ミニ四駆大追跡! (Bakusō Kyōdai Let's & Go!! WGP Bōsō Miniyonku Dai Tsuiseki!)	Movie		
Let's Go! Anpanman: The Pyramid of the Rainbow	それいけ! アンパンマン 虹のピラミッド (Soreike! Anpanman: Niji no Piramiddo)	Movie		
Locomotive Teacher	機関車先生 (Kikansha Sensei)	Movie		Japan
Licca-chan to Yamaneko Hoshi no Tabi	リカちゃんとヤマネコ 星の旅 (Licca-chan and the Wildcat: Star Trip)	OVA		
Lupin III: Island of Assassins	ルパン三世『ワルサーP38』 (Rupan Sansei: Walusa P38)	TV		
Neon Genesis Evangelion: Death & Rebirth	新世紀エヴァンゲリオン劇場版 シト新生 (Shin Seiki Evangerion Gekijō-ban: Shi to Shinsei)	Movie		
Night Warriors: Darkstalkers' Revenge	ヴァンパイアハンター THE ANIMATED SERIES	OVA		
Perfect Blue	パーフェクトブルー (Pāfekuto Burū)	Movie		
Pokémon	ポケットモンスター (Poketto Monsutā)	TV		
Princess Mononoke	もののけ姫 (Mononoke-hime)	Movie		
Psycho Diver: Soul Siren	サイコダイバー 魔性菩薩 (Psycho Diver: Mashō Bosatsu)	OVA		
Revolutionary Girl Utena	少女革命ウテナ (Shōjo Kakumei Utena)	TV		
Sakura Diaries	桜通信 (Sakura Tsūshin)	OVA		
Sakura Wars: The Gorgeous Blooming Cherry Blossoms	サクラ大戦 ～桜華絢爛～ (Sakura Taisen: Ōka Kenran)	OVA series		
Slayers Great	スレイヤーズ ぐれいと (Sureiyāzu Gurēto)	Movie		
Slayers Try	スレイヤーズTRY (Sureiyāzu Torai)	TV		
Spacibo at the End of the Edo Period	幕末のスパシーボ (Bakumatsu no Spasibo)	Movie		
Spur to Glory: The Igaya Chiharu Story	栄光へのシュプール 猪谷千春物語 (Eikō e no Spur: Igaya Chiharu Monogatari)	Movie		Japan
Spy of Darkness	淫獣VS女スパイ (Injū vs. Onna Spy)	OVA		
Starship Girl Yamamoto Yohko II	それゆけ!宇宙戦艦ヤマモト・ヨーコ II (Soreyuke! Uchū Senkan Yamamoto Yōko II)	OVA		
Tenchi the Movie 2: The Daughter of Darkness	天地無用!真夏のイヴ (Tenchi Muyō! Manatsu no Ibu)	Movie		
The Dog of Flanders: The Movie	劇場版 フランダースの犬 (Gekijôban Furandāsu no Inu)	Movie		
The King of Braves GaoGaiGar	勇者王ガオガイガー (Yūsha Ō Gaogaigā)	TV		
Those Who Hunt Elves 2	エルフを狩るモノたち II (Erufu wo Karu Mono-tachi II)	TV		
Twilight of the Dark Master	支配者の黄昏 (Shihaisha no Tasogare)	OVA		
Vampire Princess Miyu	吸血姫 美夕 (Vanpaia Miyu)	TV		
Violin in the Starry Sky	星空のバイオリン (Hoshizora no Violin)	Movie		

== See also ==
- 1997 in animation
