= Go to Hell!! =

1997 Australian adult animated comedy film

- Directed by: Ray Nowland
- Written by: Ray Nowland
- Produced by: Ray Nowland
- Starring: Keith Scott; Helen Knight
- Production company: Energee Entertainment
- Release date: 1997
- Running time: 73 minutes
- Country: Australia
- Language: English

Go to Hell!! is a 1997 Australian adult animated comedy film directed, written, produced, and animated entirely by Ray Nowland, making it one of the only feature-length films animated by a single person. The film re-imagines history in a world where God is actually an alien called "G.D.", who wiped out the dinosaurs and replaced them with apes from his own planet (which eventually evolve into humans), with the Devil being G.D.'s son (called "Little Red"), who appears throughout history in an attempt to thwart G.D.'s plans.

== Reception ==
Go to Hell!! has received very limited distribution, despite having been aired on the national television station SBS in Australia.

Despite this, the film has received positive critical reception. In AllMovie, Robert Firsching awarded the film 3½ out of 5 stars, describing it as "an impressive attempt to completely rewrite the history of the universe in less time than it takes to train a Pokémon." Steven Puchalski in Shock Cinema also praised Go to Hell!!, stating that it "crams a wealth of imagination into only 73 minutes." It described the film as follows: "ultra-crude animated feature from Australia might not look like much at first glance, but give it a chance, because it's actually a raunchy-'n'-subversive sci-fi/allegory/comedy that harkens back to the earliest, most caustic days of Ralph Bakshi."

Underground Animation recommended the film to "anyone that’s into weird fucked up animation, adult fans of ‘Blinky Bill’ or anyone interested in the history of underground, solo or Australian animation." Screen Australia described the film as "hilariously shocking". A review in The Curb wrote that it was "one of the most unique and fascinating Australian films out there."
