= Super Giant Robot Brothers =

- Genre: Action; Adventure; Comedy
- Created by: Víctor Maldonado; Alfredo Torres
- Directed by: Mark Andrews
- Voices of: Marisa Davila; Chris Diamantopoulos; Delbert Hunt; Eric Lopez
- Theme music composer: Cash Callaway (main theme); Paula Winger (main theme); Doug Rockwell (end theme); Tova Litvin (end theme)
- Composer: Alex Mandel
- Countries of origin: United States; India
- Original language: English
- No. of seasons: 1
- No. of episodes: 10

Production
- Executive producers: Mark Andrews; Tommy Blacha; Jared Mass; Steve O'Brien; Víctor Maldonado; Alfredo Torres
- Producers: Paul Flescher; Emmanual Laurent; Adam Maier
- Cinematography: Enrico Targetti
- Editor: Rob Zeigler
- Production companies: Reel FX Creative Studios; Assemblage Entertainment; Netflix Animation Studios

Original release
- Network: Netflix
- Release: August 4, 2022

Super Giant Robot Brothers is an animated adventure television series created by Victor Maldonado and Alfredo Torres for Netflix which was released on August 4, 2022.

== Premise ==
In the future, two giant robot brothers must defend the Earth from an evil intergalactic empire that is sending kaijus to destroy the world.

== Cast ==
- Marisa Davila as Alexandra "Alex" Rose
  - Eva Ariel Binder as Baby Alex
- Chris Diamantopoulos as Thunder
- Delbert Hunt as Creed
- Eric Lopez as Shiny
- Tommy Bello Rivas as Overlord Master and Dr. Arcturo Rose
- Ren Hanami as Magita Rose

Additional voices provided by Jared Ward, Gina Ravera, Anouar Smaine, Murphy Patrick Martin, David Errigo Jr., Jeanine Meyers, Delbert Hunt and Chris Jai Alex

== Episodes ==
=== Season 1 (2022) ===
No.	Title	Directed by	Written by	Original release date
1	"Gone and Back Again"	Mark Andrews	Tommy Blacha	August 4, 2022
2	"Welcome to G.R.I.T.S."	Mark Andrews	Tommy Blacha	August 4, 2022
3	"Put Me in, Coach"	Mark Andrews	Yael Galena	August 4, 2022
4	"Upgrades"	Mark Andrews	Tommy Blacha	August 4, 2022
5	"Inner Space"	Mark Andrews	Marcelina Chavira	August 4, 2022
6	"Road Trip"	Mark Andrews	Yael Galena	August 4, 2022
7	"Boybotfriend"	Mark Andrews	Marcelina Chavira	August 4, 2022
8	"Whack-a-bot"	Mark Andrews	Rachel Burger	August 4, 2022
9	"Defying Gravity, Bro"	Mark Andrews	Tommy Blacha	August 4, 2022
10	"The Hand of Fate"	Mark Andrews	Marcelina Chavira & Yael Galena	August 4, 2022
This episode ends the series on a cliffhanger.

== Production ==
The series was announced in June 2021. The show is notable for its use of virtual production techniques including motion capture and virtual camera for blocking of characters and actions inside Unreal Engine. This motion capture data was used as a reference for animators before final key frame animation was sent back to Unreal where the whole show was rendered in real-time, making the series one of the first to be rendered entirely in a real-time engine. Main animation services were provided by Reel FX's facilities in Montreal with additional animation carried out at the Mumbai-based studio Assemblage Entertainment.

== Tributes to other media ==
The series makes tribute to other media.

- In Episode 1, "Gone and Back Again", Alex Rose shouts "What's the frequency, Kenneth?" to another character, who is never referred to or seen again. This is a tribute to R.E.M.'s song "What's the frequency, Kenneth?"
- In Episode 5, "Inner Space", a random character is sneezed on and yells "This is supposed to be my day off" which is in tribute to Kevin Smith's film Clerks.
