= Neighborhood Food Drive =

- Directed by: Jerzy Rose
- Written by: Jerzy Rose
- Produced by: Halle Butler; Jerzy Rose
- Starring: Lyra Hill; Bruce Bundy; Marcos Barnes; Ruby McCollister; Ted Tremper
- Cinematography: Robert Cauble
- Music by: Tyson Thurston
- Production company: Tarwathie Films
- Release date: 20 January 2017 (Slamdance Film Festival)
- Running time: 85 minutes
- Country: United States
- Language: English

Neighborhood Food Drive is a 2017 American comedy film directed by Jerzy Rose, starring Lyra Hill, Bruce Bundy, Marcos Barnes, Ruby McCollister and Ted Tremper.

== Cast ==
- Lyra Hill as Madeline Bruhnhauer
- Bruce Bundy as Naomi Florida
- Marcos Barnes as Steven Highes
- Ruby McCollister as Bianca Pentecost
- Ted Tremper as David Bike
- Rhoda Griffis as Dean Manlowe
- Chris Sullivan as Naomi's Dad

== Release ==
The film premiered at the Slamdance Film Festival on 20 January 2017.

== Reception ==
Nick Perry of Boston Hassle called the film a "pertinent social commentary full of genuine hilarity and frank shock".

Ernesto Zelaya Miñano of ScreenAnarchy wrote that Rose "fully commits to his absurdist, black comedy tone" which "works wonders", and called the film a "refreshing change of pace from mainstream comedies and their seemingly mandatory gooey, feel-good moments."

J. R. Jones of the Chicago Reader wrote that under Rose's direction "any laughs inherent in the premise are smothered by the defensively smug tone".
