= Grease (video game) =

2010 video game

- Developers: Zoë Mode (Wii); Big Head Games (NDS)
- Publishers: 505 Games; Paramount Digital Entertainment
- Platforms: Nintendo DS, Wii
- Release: NA: August 24, 2010; EU: August 27, 2010; AU: September 16, 2010
- Genres: Music, party
- Modes: Single-player, multiplayer

Grease is a 2010 music party video game for the Wii and Nintendo DS video game consoles based on the 1978 film of the same name, itself based on the eponymous 1971 musical. 505 Games published the game along with Paramount Digital Entertainment as a part of a partnership. It was later followed in 2011 by the release of the video game Grease Dance for the PlayStation 3 and Xbox 360 Kinect.

== Gameplay ==
The game involves following the moves shown by the characters on the screen to a song from the film.

== Development ==
505 Games have announced that Zoë Mode and Big Head Games are signed on to develop the game. Zoe Mode are best known for developing such games as the SingStar series and the EyeToy: Play games. Big Head Games is a small video game publisher/developer responsible for a few iPhone/iPod Touch games including one based on The Terminator movie.

== Reception ==
Reception

Aggregate score
Aggregator	Score
Metacritic	(Wii) 55/100

Review score
Publication	Score
Hardcore Gamer	(Wii) 3/5

Metacritic, which uses a weighted average, assigned the Wii version a score of 55 out of 100, based on 6 critics, indicating "Mixed or Average".

gamesblip rated Grease for the Wii 7/10, explaining that while the gameplay is rather simple, Grease movie fans would enjoy it. Conversely, Empire gave the game a 1/5, criticizing is censorship of song lyrics, messy game design, stiff animation, and re-recorded music that sounds worse than the film's versions.
