= Grease: Rise of the Pink Ladies =

2023 American musical romantic comedy television series

- Genre: Comedy-drama; Musical; Romantic drama
- Created by: Annabel Oakes
- Based on: Grease by: Jim Jacobs; Warren Casey
- Starring: Marisa Davila; Cheyenne Isabel Wells; Ari Notartomaso; Tricia Fukuhara; Shanel Bailey; Madison Thompson; Johnathan Nieves; Jason Schmidt; Maxwell Whittington-Cooper; Jackie Hoffman
- Music by: Zachary Dawes; Nick Sena
- Country of origin: United States
- Original language: English
- No. of seasons: 1
- No. of episodes: 10

Production
- Executive producers: Annabel Oakes; Alethea Jones; Marty Bowen; Wyck Godfrey; Erik Feig; Samie Kim Falvey; Adam Fishback
- Producer: Grace Gilroy
- Production locations: Vancouver, British Columbia
- Running time: 48–59 minutes
- Production companies: Annabel Oakes & Friends; Picturestart; Temple Hill Entertainment; Paramount Television Studios

Original release
- Network: Paramount+
- Release: April 6 – June 1, 2023

Grease: Rise of the Pink Ladies is an American musical romantic comedy drama television series that was created by Annabel Oakes for Paramount+. The series is a prequel to the film Grease (1978), based on the stage musical of the same name by Jim Jacobs and Warren Casey. It aired from April 6, 2023 to June 1, 2023 on Paramount+. The series was canceled later that month and removed from Paramount+.

== Premise ==
The series takes place in 1954, six years before the events of Grease, and follows four fed-up and misfit students who band together to bring out the moral panic that will change Rydell High forever and become the founding mothers of the first female high school gang, known as the "Pink Ladies".

== Cast and characters ==
=== Main ===
- Marisa Davila as Jane Facciano, a student of Rydell High School, founding member of the Pink Ladies, the first female student to run for class president, and older sister of Fran "Frenchy" Facciano.
- Cheyenne Isabel Wells as Olivia Valdovinos, a student of Rydell High School, founding member of the Pink Ladies, and younger sister of T-Bird member, Richie, with a reputation based on rumors which she does not care about.
- Ari Notartomaso as Cynthia Zdunowski, a tomboyish student of Rydell High School who wanted to be a T-Bird before becoming a founding member of the Pink Ladies.
- Tricia Fukuhara as Nancy Nakagawa, a student of Rydell High School, aspiring fashion designer, and founding member of the Pink Ladies.
- Shanel Bailey as Hazel Robertson, a shy student of Rydell High School student who ends up taking on the lead female role in Romeo and Juliet.
- Madison Thompson as Susan St. Clair, a student of Rydell High School, member of Rydell High's Dance Committee, and Buddy's ex-girlfriend.
- Johnathan Nieves as Richie Valdovinos, a student of Rydell High School, member of the T-Birds, one of Jane's two love interests, and Olivia's older brother.
- Jason Schmidt as Buddy Aldridge, a student of Rydell High School from a prominent family and one of Jane's two love interests.
- Maxwell Whittington-Cooper as Wally Winslow, a student at Rydell High School who has a crush on Hazel.
- Jackie Hoffman as Asst. Principal McGee, the assistant Principal of Rydell High School who eventually goes on to become the principal as of Grease.

=== Recurring ===
- Chris McNally as Mr. Leonard Daniels, an English teacher at Rydell High School and the head of the school newspaper who pursued a fling with Olivia until they got caught.
- Josette Halpert as Dorothy "Dot", a Rydell High School student, friend of Susan, and member of the Dance Committee.
- Maximo Weber Salas as Edward "Shy Guy", a student of Rydell High School, member of the T-Birds and a boxer, the last of which he does not enjoy.
- Alexis Sides as "Potato", a student of Rydell High School and member of the T-Birds who is also known as "Pedrito".
- Nicholas McDonough as Gil Rizzo, a student of Rydell High School, member of the T-Birds, and older brother of Betty.
- Niamh Wilson as Lydia, a student of Rydell High School and member of the thespians.
- Madison Elizabeth Lagares as Fran "Frenchy" Facciano, the younger sister of Jane Facciano who eventually goes on to become a Pink Lady as of Grease.
- Emma Shannon as Betty Rizzo, the younger sister of Gil Rizzo who eventually goes on to become the leader of the Pink Ladies as of Grease.
- Charlotte Kavanagh as Rosemary, a Rydell High School student and cheerleader.

== Production ==
=== Development ===
The series was given a straight-to-series order by WarnerMedia in October 2019 under the title Grease: Rydell High, set to air on their streaming service HBO Max. In April 2020, Annabel Oakes was hired to write the pilot episode and act as executive producer for the series. In May 2020, the title of the series was changed to Grease: Rise of the Pink Ladies, and it was announced that the series is set to premiere in 2021.

In October 2020, it was announced that the series would instead premiere on Paramount+ after Chief Content Officer for HBO and HBO Max Casey Bloys decided to not move forward with the series at HBO Max. Along with the change of network, Annabel Oakes was announced to serve as creator of the series. In July 2021, the series was given a ten-episode series order officially by Paramount+. Marty Bowen and Erik Feig joined the series as executive producers. Alethea Jones was announced as a producer in October 2021 and also directs the first episode.

=== Casting ===
On January 31, 2022, it was reported that Marisa Davila, Cheyenne Isabel Wells, Ari Notartomaso, Tricia Fukuhara, Shanel Bailey, (as the Pink Ladies) Madison Thompson, Johnathan Nieves, Jason Schmidt, Maxwell Whittington-Cooper, and Jackie Hoffman were cast in starring roles. In February 2022, it was announced Chris McNally, Charlotte Kavanagh, Josette Halpert, Nicholas McDonough, Maximo Weber Salas, and Alexis Sides joined the cast in recurring capacities.

=== Filming ===
The series was initially scheduled to be filmed in California after receiving a tax credit to shoot in the state. On January 31, 2022, it was reported that production had begun in Vancouver, British Columbia.

== Episodes ==
No.	Title	Directed by	Teleplay by	Original release date
1	"We're Gonna Rule the School"	Alethea Jones	Annabel Oakes	April 6, 2023
2	"Too Pure to Be Pink"	Alethea Jones	Mackenzie Dohr	April 6, 2023
3	"So This Is Rydell"	Diego Velasco	Auriel Rudnick & Kay Rich	April 13, 2023
4	"If You Can't Be an Athlete, Be an Athletic Supporter"	Marie Jamora	Christina Nieves	April 20, 2023
5	"You Can't Just Walk Out of a Drive-In"	Jennifer Morrison	Robert Sudduth	April 27, 2023
6	"Sloppy Seconds Ain't My Style"	Jamal Sims	Laura Pollak	May 4, 2023
7	"Cruisin' for a Bruisin"	Alethea Jones	Mackenzie Dohr & Raul Martin Romero	May 11, 2023
8	"Or at the High School Dance"	Annabel Oakes	Alison Wong	May 18, 2023
9	"You're Dropping Out of Rydell"	Ruben Garcia	Phylicia Pearl Mpasi	May 25, 2023
10	"Racing for Pinks"	Benny Boom	Gabe Liedman & Samantha Cordero	June 1, 2023

== Music ==
Around 30 new songs were written for the series by American songwriter Justin Tranter, some co-written with others, with each intending to add a contemporary take on but still capture 1950s-style nostalgia and harmonies. They are the executive music producer for the series. Tranter recognized the music would be remembered as a snapshot of this present time, and purposely crafted the music to be in line with the story and characters.

== Release ==
The premiere of Grease: Rise of the Pink Ladies was first earmarked for early 2023 in a story in Entertainment Weekly in December 2022. On January 9, 2023, the series was announced at a Television Critics Association panel to premiere on April 6, 2023. The show's first season concluded on June 1, 2023. The series was removed from Paramount+ in June 2023.

The series was released on digital on July 24, 2023, and was followed by a physical DVD release on November 7, 2023.

== Reception ==
Review aggregator website Rotten Tomatoes reported a 63% approval rating, with an average rating of 6.7/10, based on 38 critic reviews. The website's critics consensus reads, "Rise of the Pink Ladies isn't quite automatic, systematic, or hydromatic with its catalogue of merely passable songs, but the core cast is plucky enough that nostalgic viewers will want it to tell them more, tell them more." Metacritic, which uses a weighted average, assigned a score of 59 out of 100 based on 14 critics, indicating "mixed or average reviews".
