= Grease Dance =

2011 video game

- North American PlayStation 3 cover art. The final version features French (so that the game may be sold in Canada)
- Developer: Zoë Mode
- Publisher: 505 Games
- Platforms: PlayStation 3 Xbox 360
- Release: NA: October 25, 2011; AU: November 3, 2011; EU: November 4, 2011
- Genres: Music, Rhythm
- Modes: Single-player, multiplayer

Grease Dance is a 2011 rhythm dance game developed by Zoë Mode and published by 505 Games for the PlayStation 3 and Xbox 360. Based on the 1978 film Grease (which itself is based on the 1971 musical of the same name), the game requires either PlayStation Move or Xbox Kinect. The game also includes 20 songs, 15 of which are from the original movie. It is the second game to be based on Grease, following 2010's Grease, which was partially created by the same developer.

== Gameplay ==
The title's standard mode is "Dance" which has players mimicking motions that appear on the screen to music using either a PlayStation Move or Kinect (depending on the console). Only 15 of the game's 20 songs are available to dance to. In multiplayer, players may complete head to head or perform a coop dance routine. One competitive mode exclusive to multiplayer is "Challenge", which has players performing a dance routine while also completing small tasks throughout the song, such as freezing in place for a set number of time. Also available is Karaoke, which allows players to use a USB microphone or the built in mics on the PlayStation Eye or Kinect to sing the song as it plays. Up to eight players may play at once using "Party mode", in which two teams consisting of two singers and two dancers face off against each other. In all modes, players can earn a score multiplier by completing five or more pages with an "Ok" or higher rating, which increases the number of points earned for a move.

Players can also unlock film clips and mini-games based on movie scenes to play, most of which do not involve the core aspect of dancing or singing. For example, the "Thunder Road Race" mini-game is a race course in which players use hand gestures to boost and steer their car in a head to head race with the computer.

== Development ==
The game was shown by publisher 505 Games at the 2011 Electronic Entertainment Expo as part of their Kinect exhibit, which also included games such as Blackwater and Michael Phelps: Push the Limit. The PlayStation 3 version uses LiveMove 2 technology. Grease Dance was released on disc on October 25, 2011 in North America, with and Australian and European release coming on November 3 and November 4, respectively. The game was released as a download title on the PlayStation Store and Xbox Live Arcade in the three regions on June 26, 2012.

== Track list ==
† indicates song was not from the movie.

1. "Grease"
2. "You're the One That I Want"
3. "Look at Me, I'm Sandra Dee"
4. "Hound Dog"
5. "Summer Nights"
6. "Greased Lightnin'"
7. "Sandy"
8. "It's Raining on Prom Night"
9. "Beauty School Dropout"
10. "Long Tall Sally"†
11. "Rock Around the Clock"†
12. "Tutti Frutti"†
13. "Those Magic Changes"
14. "Jailhouse Rock"†
15. "Yakety Yak"†
16. "Rock n' Roll Party Queen"
17. "Born to Hand Jive"
18. "We Go Together"
19. "There Are Worse Things I Could Do"
20. "Hopelessly Devoted to You"

== Reception ==
Grease Dance received mixed to negative reviews upon release. Official Xbox Magazine awarded the Xbox 360 version a 6/10, with the UK version of the magazine giving the game a 7/10. Push Square reviewed the PlayStation 3 version, giving it a 5/10.
