= Marisa Davila =

American actress (born 1997)

- Born: April 24, 1997 (age 29); Murfreesboro, Tennessee, U.S.
- Occupation: Actress
- Years active: 2015–present

Marisa Davila (born 1997) is an American actress, notable for her main roles in Super Giant Robot Brothers (2022) and Grease: Rise of the Pink Ladies in 2023.

== Early life ==
Davila was born 1997, and raised in Murfreesboro, Tennessee, (near Nashville). Her parents were both involved in the music industry: her mother Julie Davila as a drummer, percussion teacher, clinician of marching percussion, and PAS board director; and her father Lalo Davila, who is first generation Mexican American, as an author, professor of music, and percussion director at Middle Tennessee State University.

Davila has experienced music rehearsals and band practice since the age of six, along with her older sister, Danielle. She has participated in theatre and acting and dance classes, and has had regular voice-over parts. Aged from 10 onwards, she has participated in many theatrical productions, and has performed with the Nashville Symphony. In 2014, at the age of 17, Davila sought to expand her acting career, by moving to Los Angeles, California, with her mother, while at the same time, after much private tuition, earned herself an online diploma. Davila completed a course in the Lyndon Technique, she is a member of SAG-AFTRA, and currently (2023) resides in Valley Village, California.

== Career ==
As a child, Davila was singing the voice of Jasmine on the Disney Junior stage adaptation of Aladdin. In 2015, Davila made her screen debut as Jane in the Jing Shao directed short film Text History of Jane about the dangers of texting while driving. The short film went on to win the National ADDY Award of the American Advertising Federation in 2016.

In 2016, Marisa Davila appeared in a single episode of "Crazy Ex-Girlfriend, and in an episode of Liv and Maddie as a member of the Porcu-Piper school choir. In 2017, she appeared in Speechless, working alongside Minnie Driver. and the same year in Atypical where she plays mean girl Maddison Gold.

In 2016, Davila featured on Crazy Ex-Girlfriend: Season 1 (Original Soundtrack) Commentary Album. In 2019, she released her first single Too Busy.

In 2019, she secured a guest role in the sit-com Carol's Second Act, and appeared in 2 episodes of Schooled, In 2020, she Mercedes Callahan in the Netflix series I Am Not Okay with This, and had a small part in the rom-com movie Holidate.

In 2022, she had a lead voice role for season one of the Netflix action-comedy animated series Super Giant Robot Brothers.

In 2023, Marisa Davila plays the main role of Jane Facciano, the leader of the group of four girls in the upcoming Paramount+ American musical romantic comedy television series Grease: Rise of the Pink Ladies which is a prequel to the 1978 film Grease. During the series, Davila gets to sing, along with her cast members, many new songs written by American songwriter Justin Tranter, each having a 50's style harmony with a modern twist.

== Filmography ==
Year	Title	Role	Notes
2015	Text History of Jane	Jane	Short film
2016	Crazy Ex-Girlfriend	Chloe	Episode: "I'm Back at Camp with Josh!"
2016	Liv and Maddie	Choir Member #1	1 episode
2017	The Raking	Kelly	Film
2017	Speechless	Mary	1 episode
2017	Atypical	Madison Gold	1 episode
2018	Don't Go	Prima	Short film
2018	Ocean	Brooke	Short film
2018	Willie Jones: Runs in Our Blood	Party girl	Music Video
2018	Cloak & Dagger	Choir Member #3	1 episode
2018	Tournament	Kate	Film
2018	We're Not Friends	Charlie	1 episode
2019	Second Thoughts	Sabrina	Short film
2019	Carol's Second Act	Harper	1 episode
2019	Beyond the Cracks	Jessica	Short
2020	Holidate	Princess Leia	Film
2019–2020	Schooled	Gina Rivera	2 episodes
2020	I Am Not Okay with This	Mercedes Callahan	2 episodes
2021	Love and Baseball	Eva	Film
2021	My Big Fat Blonde Musical	Megan	7 episodes
2021	The Artful Escape	Lucy Punter 1 Softserve Child 2 (voice)	Video Game
2022	Super Giant Robot Brothers	Alex Rose (voice)	Main role - 10 episodes
2023	Grease: Rise of the Pink Ladies	Jane Facciano	Main role - 10 episodes

== Awards and nominations ==
Year	Award	Category	Work	Result	Ref
2016	Zed Fest Film Festival	Outstanding Group Ensemble (shared)	The Raking	Won	
2018	Independent Shorts Awards	Bronze award for best actress	Beyond the Cracks	Won	
