= Jeff Buckley discography =

- Studio albums: 1
- Extended plays: 3
- Live albums: 8
- Compilation albums: 10
- Box sets: 1

This is a discography for the American singer-songwriter and guitarist Jeff Buckley.

== Albums ==
=== Studio album ===
Title	Details	Peak chart positions										Certifications (sales thresholds)
Title	Details	US	US Heat.	AUS	BEL	CAN	FRA	IRL	NLD	NOR	UK	Certifications (sales thresholds)
Grace	Released: August 15, 1994; Label: Columbia Records	82	5	9	39	67	47	14	84	38	31	RIAA: Platinum; ARIA: 8× Platinum; BPI: 3× Platinum; MC: Gold; IFPI: Platinum; SNEP: Platinum

=== Compilation albums ===
Title	Details	Peak chart positions										Certifications (sales thresholds)
Title	Details	US	AUS	BEL	FRA	GER	IRL	NLD	NOR	NZL	UK	Certifications (sales thresholds)
Sketches for My Sweetheart the Drunk	Released: May 11, 1998; Label: Columbia	64	1	13	6	93	—	62	10	7	7	ARIA: 2× Platinum; BPI: Gold
Songs to No One 1991–1992	Released: October 15, 2002; Label: Circus Records, Knitting Factory	—	—	—	34	—	—	—	—	—	191	
So Real: Songs from Jeff Buckley	Released: May 25, 2007; Label: Columbia	—	26	29	14	—	1	52	—	25	16	ARIA: Gold; BPI: Gold; IRMA: Gold; SNEP: Gold
Grace + EPs 1996–1997	Released: June 10, 2009; Label: Sony Music	—	—	—	—	—	—	—	—	—	—	
The Jeff Buckley Collection	Released: May 16, 2010; Label: Sony Music	—	—	—	—	—	—	—	—	—	—	
Original Album Classics	Released: September 10, 2010; Label: Sony Music	—	—	—	—	—	—	—	—	—	—	
Jeff Buckley: Music & Photos	Released: February 26, 2013; Label: Sony Music	—	—	—	—	—	—	—	—	—	—	
Playlist: The Very Best of Jeff Buckley	Released: May 21, 2013; Label: Sony Music	—	—	—	—	—	—	—	—	—	—	
You and I	Released: March 11, 2016; Label: Sony Music	58	2	16	17	85	22	12	—	15	16	
In Transition	Released: April 13, 2019; Label: Sony Music	—	—	—	—	—	—	—	—	—	—	

=== Live albums ===
Title	Details	Peak chart positions										Certifications (sales thresholds)
Title	Details	US	AUS	BEL	FRA	GER	IRL	ITA	NLD	SWI	UK	Certifications (sales thresholds)
Mystery White Boy	Released: May 9, 2000; Label: Columbia	133	5	5	3	87	13	14	88	95	8	ARIA: Gold; BPI: Silver
Live À L'Olympia	Released: July 3, 2001; Label: Sony International	190	26	—	22	—	—	37	—	—	100	
Live at Sin-é (Legacy Edition)	Released: December 1993; Re-issued: August 27, 2003; Label: Columbia Records	—	—	—	65	—	58	66	—	—	101	
Grace Around the World	Released: June 2, 2009; Label: Columbia	125	—	83	187	—	—	41	—	—	—	
Live from King Theater, Seattle, WA, May 7, 1995	Released: June 2, 2009 (digital download); Label: Columbia	—	—	—	—	—	—	—	—	—	—	
Live at Cabaret Metro, Chicago, IL, May 13, 1995	Released: August 23, 2019 (digital download); Label: Columbia	—	—	—	—	—	—	—	—	—	—	
Live at Wetlands, New York, NY, August 16, 1994	Released: August 23, 2019 (digital download); Label: Columbia	—	—	—	—	—	—	—	—	—	—	
Live at Columbia Records Radio Hour, New York, NY, June 4, 1995	Released: August 23, 2019 (digital download); Label: Columbia	—	—	—	—	—	—	—	—	—	—	

=== Box sets ===
Title	Details	Peak chart positions
Title	Details	UK
The Grace EPs	Released: November 26, 2002; Label: Columbia	194

== EPs ==
Title	Details	Peak chart positions
Title	Details	AUS
Live at Sin-é	Released: November 23, 1993; Label: Columbia, Big Cat	53
Live from the Bataclan	Released: April 1, 1996; Label: Columbia	—

== Singles ==
Title	Year	Peak chart positions										Certifications	Album
Title	Year	US Bub.	US Alt.	AUS	AUT	IRL	NLD	NOR	NZL	SWE	UK	Certifications	Album
"Grace"	1994	—	—	91	—	—	—	—	—	—	—	BPI: Silver	Grace
"Last Goodbye"	1994	—	19	88	—	—	—	—	—	—	54	BPI: Silver; RMNZ: Gold	Grace
"So Real"	1995	—	—	—	—	—	—	—	—	—	—		Grace
"Eternal Life"	1995	—	—	44	—	—	—	—	—	—	—		Grace
"Everybody Here Wants You"	1998	—	—	35	—	—	—	—	—	—	43	RMNZ: Gold	Sketches for My; Sweetheart the Drunk
"Forget Her"	2004	—	—	—	—	—	—	—	—	—	—		Grace (Legacy Edition)
"Hallelujah"	2007	7	—	70	38	8	3	7	22	5	2	RIAA: 2× Platinum; ARIA: 2× Platinum; BPI: Platinum; MC: 2× Platinum; RMNZ: 2× Platinum	Grace
"—" denotes a recording that did not chart or was not released in that territory.

=== Promotional singles ===
Title	Year	Peak chart positions				Certifications	Album
Title	Year	US	CAN	IRL	UK	Certifications	Album
"She Is Free"	2002	—	—	—	—		Songs to No One 1991–1992
"Everyday People"	2015	—	—	—	—		You and I
"The Boy with the Thorn in His Side"	2016	—	—	—	—	BPI: Silver	You and I
"Lover, You Should've Come Over"	2018	84	80	56	61	BPI: Platinum; RMNZ: 2× Platinum	Grace
"Sky Blue Skin"	2019	—	—	—	—		—N/a

=== Other appearances ===
- "We All Fall in Love Sometimes" (2009) – cover of Elton John song used in the film My Sister's Keeper.

== Video ==
Year	Title	Release date	Certification
2000	Live in Chicago	May 9, 2000	ARIA: 5× Platinum
2000	Jeff Buckley: Goodbye and Hello	October 12, 2000	
2002	Everybody Here Wants You	2002	
2009	Grace Around the World	June 2, 2009	ARIA: Platinum
2009	Amazing Grace: Jeff Buckley	June 2, 2009	

=== Music videos ===
- "Grace" (1994)
- "Last Goodbye" (1994)
- "So Real" (1995)
- "Everybody Here Wants You" (1997)
- "Forget Her" (2004)
- "Hallelujah" (2007)
- "I Know It's Over" (2016)
- "Everyday People" (2016)
- "Just Like a Woman" (2016)
- "Sky Blue Skin" (2019)

== Guest appearances and collaborations ==
Buckley was immersed in music and, when not working on his own material or with his band, he contributed numerous times to projects with his friends and musical peers. John Zorn regularly held collaborations at the Knitting Factory, and Buckley performed vocals on the tracks "Taipan" and "D.Popylepis" that appeared on 1992 album John Zorn's Cobra: Live at the Knitting Factory. Buckley contributed vocals on "Jolly Street" from The Jazz Passengers' 1994 album In Love, and he played six string bass and drums on tracks from his ex-girlfriend Rebecca Moore's album Admiral Charcoal's Song. Buckley also performed backup vocals and guitar on Brenda Kahn's "Faith Salons" which was released on her 1996 album Destination Anywhere. On Patti Smith's 1996 album Gone Again, Buckley provided vocals on "Beneath the Southern Cross" and played esraj on "Fireflies". He co-wrote "Despite the Tears" with Chris Dowd, then lead singer of The Seedy Arkhestra, for the album Puzzle, co-produced by Dan Siegler and also contributed vocals and guitar on two more tracks, "A Thousand Tears" and "Flog Your Dead Horse". Buckley's drummer Matt Johnson played on the album as well, along with Joan Wasser and Joseph "Amp" Fiddler. Dowd had previously co-written "What Will You Say" with Buckley and Carla Azar, which appeared on Mystery White Boy.

Buckley also collaborated with other musicians on different projects. He appeared on the soundtrack of First Love, Last Rites, performing vocals on "I Want Someone Badly" backed by the group Shudder to Think. This song later appeared on Grace (Legacy Edition). He performed two tributes to writers he admired: he read Edgar Allan Poe's poem "Ulalume" for the album Closed on Account of Rabies, and on Kerouac: Kicks Joy Darkness, a tribute to beat poet Jack Kerouac, Buckley performed "Angel Mine" with Inger Lorre. In Los Angeles, Buckley co-wrote and recorded the song "Hollywould" with Sandy Bell, which she released in 2000.

== Unreleased recordings ==
Since Jeff Buckley only completed one album, many posthumous releases, as well as bootlegged unreleased live recordings, have proved popular with fans. These recordings come from all periods of his career; in particular, Buckley made many soundboard recordings of the concerts from his 1995–1996 tours. Mary Guibert, his mother and head of his estate, expressed an interest in releasing these live concerts as a special subscription series, leaving the recordings uncut: "warts and all". However, this project has yet to come to fruition.

A number of Buckley's 4 track demos for My Sweetheart the Drunk have been leaked over the internet but the majority of the demos from this period have remained out of the public domain. Michael Tighe has made reference in particular to one track, "Sky Blue Skin", that he personally feels is a very important song of Buckley's (the track was finally released in 2019). Other names of unreleased songs from the demos have circulated amongst fans including: "The Morning After", "Open Up and Bleed", "Dendrils of Death", "Don't Listen to Anyone But Me", and "Pleasure Seeker". A version of "Dendrils of Death" has been recorded by Buckley's old bassist, Mick Grondahl, and his band Tongue.

Certain live performances by Buckley have specifically been held in high regard. "Dido's Lament", an aria from Dido and Æneas by Henry Purcell, was performed live at the Meltdown festival in 1995, directed by Elvis Costello. The falsetto operatic piece is unusual in Buckley's catalogue, having similarities only with Buckley's version of "Corpus Christi Carol" featured on Grace. Although unreleased, an excerpt of this version of "Dido's Lament" has appeared on the soundtrack of BBC documentary Everybody Here Wants You. "Edna Frau" was written with Mick Grondahl, Buckley's bassist and was performed live on at least one occasion on The Hard Luck Tour. Grondahl also sings on this song and it was the only occasion he did so during the time he was a member of Buckley's band. Other popular recordings are a performance of "We All Fall in Love Sometimes" by Elton John and Bernie Taupin recorded on October 11, 1992, for WFMU's "The Music Faucet" and "Three is The Magic Number", by Schoolhouse Rock, from Buckley's Mercury Lounge 1996 New Year's Eve concert.

Michael Tighe also mentioned Buckley's collaboration with Elizabeth Fraser of Cocteau Twins, describing "All Flowers in Time Bend Towards the Sun" as a beautiful piece worthy of release. Buckley contributed to a piece of music about alien abduction called "Ozark Melody". The song was recorded in the middle of 1996, with lyrics written by Joe Tripician while the music was composed by Buckley and Frederick Reed. This song is available to download on the internet with permission from the Estate of Jeff Buckley, but has not had an official release.
