= So Real: Songs from Jeff Buckley =

Compilation album by Jeff Buckley
- Released: May 25, 2007
- Genre: Alternative; folk rock
- Length: 72:31
- Label: Columbia

Jeff Buckley chronology
The Grace EPs (2002)	So Real: Songs from Jeff Buckley (2007)	Grace Around the World (2009)

Professional ratings
Review scores
Source	Rating
AllMusic	3.5/5 stars
NME	4/5 stars
Pitchfork	5.0/10

So Real: Songs from Jeff Buckley is a 'best of' compilation album of Jeff Buckley material, released on May 25, 2007.

It reached number one on the Irish Albums Chart and number 26 in Australia. The album also peaked at number 16 in the UK, becoming Buckley's third consecutive top 20 album; its sales increased there in early 2009 after "Hallelujah" reached the top three on the UK Singles Chart.

== Track listing ==
1. "Last Goodbye" (Grace) – 4:36
2. "Lover, You Should've Come Over" (Grace) – 6:42
3. "Forget Her" (Grace Legacy Edition) – 5:10
4. "Eternal Life" (Road Version) (Grace Legacy Edition) – 4:47
5. "Dream Brother" (Alternate Take) (Grace Legacy Edition) – 4:54
6. "The Sky Is a Landfill" (Sketches) – 5:05
7. "Everybody Here Wants You" (Sketches) – 4:45
8. "So Real" (acoustic in Japan)^{1} – 4:22
9. "Mojo Pin" (Live at Sin-é) – 5:19
10. "Vancouver" (Sketches) – 3:10
11. "Je n'en connais pas la fin" (Live at Sin-é) – 4:57
12. "Grace" (Grace) – 5:22
13. "Hallelujah" (Grace) – 6:55
14. "I Know It's Over" (live)^{2} – 6:28
15. "Lilac Wine" (live)^{3} – 5:31 (iTunes exclusive bonus track)
16. "Lover, You Should've Come Over" (live)^{4} – 6:53 (AmazonMP3 exclusive bonus track)

^{1} Non-album version and previously available only as promotional single
^{2} Previously unavailable. A live rendition of "I Know It's Over" from The Smiths' 1986 album The Queen Is Dead, recorded at Sony Studios in New York City, April, 1995.
^{3} Available with full album download only.
^{4} AmazonMP3 lists this track as "previously unreleased".

== Charts ==
Chart performance for So Real: Songs from Jeff Buckley
Chart (2007–2008)	Peak position
Australian Albums (ARIA)	26
Belgian Albums (Ultratop Flanders)	29
Danish Albums (Hitlisten)	17
Dutch Albums (Album Top 100)	52
French Albums (SNEP)	14
Irish Albums (IRMA)	1
Italian Albums (FIMI)	78
New Zealand Albums (RMNZ)	25
UK Albums (OCC)	16

== Certifications ==
Certifications for So Real: Songs from Jeff Buckley
Region	Certification	Certified units/sales
Australia (ARIA)	Gold	35,000^{^}
New Zealand (RMNZ)	Gold	7,500^{‡}
^{^} Shipments figures based on certification alone.^{‡} Sales+streaming figures based on certification alone.
