= Amazing Grace: Jeff Buckley =

- Theatrical release poster
- Directed by: Nyla Bialek Adams; Laurie Trombley
- Produced by: Nyla Bialek Adams; Laurie Trombley
- Edited by: Nyla Bialek Adams; John Neely
- Release date: October 15, 2004
- Running time: 62 minutes
- Country: United States
- Language: English

Amazing Grace: Jeff Buckley is a 2004 documentary film about American singer-songwriter Jeff Buckley. It was shot, directed, and produced by first-time filmmakers Nyla Bialek Adams & Laurie Trombley. The film officially premiered at the Woodstock International Film Festival on October 15, 2004 and in 2009 was released as a bonus DVD for the extended edition of the album Grace Around the World.

The documentary was screened in various film festivals internationally between the years of 2004-2006, winning 4 awards during this run including the CMJ Signature Award at the 2004 CMJ FilmFest, Best Music Documentary at the 2005 San Francisco World Film Festival, and Best Film and Best Documentary at the D.I.Y. Film Festival.

== Synopsis ==
The documentary focuses on the life, career, and legacy of American musician Jeff Buckley. The film features footage taken from his performances as well as footage from interviews he held during his lifetime, up until his death in 1997. Performances and outtakes have been culled from the warehouse archives of Columbia Records.

The film opens with archival footage of Buckley detailing his musical influences, which he describes as "love, anger, depression, joy and dreams... and Zeppelin", and a performance of "Hallelujah". Filmmakers Adams and Trombley sought to explore Buckley's the impact of Buckley's legacy, comparing his fame and recognition in Europe to the "mysterious footnote" he became in America. The film follows Buckley's career from aspiring musician performing in small venues in New York City, most notably Sin-é where his first live EP was recorded, to landing a record deal with Columbia Records, who hoped he would rise to the musical icon statuses of Bob Dylan and Bruce Springsteen.

The documentary details his run performing at Sin-é in the early 1990s, releasing his live EP Live at Sin-é, the process of recording and releasing his first and only full-length studio album Grace, and his tour through North America, Europe, Japan, and Australia to promote said album. The film uses a mixture of Buckley's interviews and performances, interviews with friends, collaborators, fans, and artists who were inspired by Buckley to showcase his career and lasting impact in the industry after his tragic death. On May 29, 1997 while working on his second studio album, My Sweetheart the Drunk, Buckley went for a swim in Memphis' Wolf River Harbor and never returned. He was declared missing, which the documentary briefly focuses on, and his body was later found on June 4, 1997. His death was ruled an accidental drowning.

Directors Adams and Trombley conducted interviews with various artists of different mediums who were inspired by Buckley's music, such as with Soundgarden frontman Chris Cornell, Skid Row frontman and actor Sebastian Bach, classical composer Maria Castro, author and journalist David Browne, painter Gary Bernard, dancer and choreographer Ingeborg Liptay, and musician Duncan Sheik. To further showcase Buckley's impact on these artists, the documentary includes paintings from Bernard, a dance performance by Liptay and her collaborators from Compagnie Ici et Maintenant, an original song by Sheik, and a composition created by Castro and performed by the Bacchus String Quartet, all inspired by Buckley's life and music. The film also includes a clip of Sebastian Bach performing a cover of "Eternal Life" at the Whisky a Go Go.

According to the filmmakers, the goal of the documentary was to explore "the unusual, if not extraordinary, phenomenon of Jeff Buckley" and find the source of his long-lasting, inspirational legacy, which was attributed to his loyal fanbase.

== Contributors ==
The documentary features contributions via archival footage, recorded interviews, and art performances from the following:

- Jeff Buckley (archival footage)
- Mary Guilbert, mother
- David Fricke, journalist
- Michael Tighe, guitarist
- Chris Cornell, musician and friend
- Susan McKeown, musician and friend
- Sebastian Bach, singer and actor
- Shane Doyle, owner of Sin-é
- Hal Willner, producer and friend
- Jimi Zhivago, producer and friend
- Krissy Teegerstrom, producer
- Maria Castro, classical composer
- Kristin Mills, Bacchus String Quartet
- Sarah Elizabeth Newman, Bacchus String Quartet
- Luisa Nicholson, Bacchus String Quartet
- Elizabeth Wheeler, Bacchus String Quartet
- David Browne, author
- Richard Kingsmill, music director
- Matt Johnson, drummer
- Mick Grondahl, bassist
- Sandy Bell, musician and friend
- Gary Bernard, painter
- Ingeborg Liptay, dancer and choreographer
- Agnes de Lagausie, Compagnie Ici et Maintenant
- Barbara Gaultier, Compagnie Ici et Maintenant
- Hamlett Dobbins, fan
- Parker Kindred, drummer
- Foti, friend
- Duncan Sheik, musician

== Production ==
The documentary marked the directorial debut of both Nyla Bialek Adams and Laurie Trombley, who also served as its producers and camera operators. Adams additionally served as editor alongside John Neely, with additional editing by Michelle Cabalu.

The directors came up with the idea for the documentary in 1998 while working together at A&E Television Networks, choosing to focus on the impact of Buckley's music in the industry because of their shared loved for the singer and Trombley's previous work experience managing Buckley's fan relations at DE-EL Entertainment. They began the project by sending Buckley's mother, Mary Guilbert, a letter asking for her permission to create the film, which led to a meeting where Guilbert gave the two directors her blessing to go forward with the project. According to the directors, Guilbert originally disapproved of the project but was fully on board after the meeting since an independent, non-profit film focusing on his legacy rather than his life was something she thought Buckley would approve of.

After receiving Guilbert's blessing, the directors set out on a six year journey to shoot the film. They began by searching for artists who were inspired by Buckley's music, compiling a list of potential candidates, acquiring samples of their art, and selecting those that they thought would best translate to film. Then, with the support of Buckley's former tour and management team, the filmmakers reached out to Buckley's friends, fans, and most frequented spots to gather interviews and archival footage for the film. Shooting for the film began toward the end of 1999, 2 years after Buckley's death. Adams and Trombley personally conducted interviews with Buckley's mother, friends, collaborators, and fans that they located through the singer's official website.

As this was the filmmakers' first project, much of the more technical aspects of production were learned on the job with advice from their connections at A&E Entertainment. After collecting over sixty hours of footage, Adams and fellow editor John Neely embarked on the task to edit the film. With no post-production budget and working on off-hours from their full-time jobs, the film was completed in 2004 after a "triumphant, though arduous" editing process.

Profits from the film's distribution went to charities associated with the Estate of Jeff Buckley.

== Music ==
The documentary includes various songs from Buckley's debut studio album Grace such as: "Hallelujah", "Grace", "Eternal Life", "Mojo Pin", "Last Goodbye", "So Real" and "Lover, You Should've Come Over". The film also includes Buckley's cover of Led Zeppelin's "Night Flight" from his live EP Live at Sin-é, "I Woke up in a Strange Place" from the posthumous live album Mystery White Boy, "Dream Brother (Nag Champa Mix)" which was released posthumously in Grace: Legacy Edition, and a number of songs from Buckley's posthumous compilation album Sketches for My Sweetheart the Drunk such as: "New Year's Prayer", "The Sky Is a Landfill", "Nightmares by the Sea", "I Know We Could Be So Happy Baby (If We Wanted to Be)", and his cover of Joe "Red" Hayes and Jack Rhodes' song "A Satisfied Mind".

== Release ==
=== Festival screenings ===
Amazing Grace: Jeff Buckley premiered on August 15, 2004 at the Don't Knock The Rock Music and Film Festival in a secret screening. The documentary had its official East Coast premiere at the Woodstock Film Festival on October 15, 2004 and at the CMJ New Music Marathon Film Festival on October 16, 2004, both in New York. It had its international premiere at the Leeds International Film Festival on October 30, 2004 in Leeds, United Kingdom.

The film had its West Coast premiere at the Cinequest Film & Creativity Festival on March 9, 2005. It had additional 2005 festival screenings at the Buenos Aires Independent Film Festival, Belfast Film Festival, FEST - Festival de Cinema e Video Jovem, Independent Film Festival of Boston, Seattle International Film Festival, MusicFest NW, Athens International Film Festival, In-Edit Film Festival, Sound Unseen, Popcorn Film Festival, and San Francisco World Film Festival.

The documentary continued screening in additional festivals in 2006 such as the Reel Music Film Festival, DIY Film Festival, Big Smash: Music-On-Film Festival, Noise Pop Festival, Memphis International Film Festival, Copenhagen: The Music In The Dark Festival, Alamo Drafthouse: Music Mondays Series, and the Memphis Brooks Museum of Art before ending its festival run at the Revelation Perth International Film Festival.

=== Home media ===
The documentary was later released as a bonus DVD for the deluxe version of the album Grace Around the World, issued by Sony Legacy in 2009.

== Reception ==
=== Critical response ===
Critical reception for Amazing Grace: Jeff Buckley has been mostly positive. Paste magazine reviewed the film, noting that "This reverent, powerful film doesn’t answer any questions about Buckley’s death, but it assures that his greatest gifts are still with us." Denis Harvey of Variety was more critical, writing that "Electrifying performance footage in 'Amazing Grace' underlines the sense that a great talent was lost. But this less-than-definitive docu portrait works overtime abetting his tragic-hero mythology, worshipping the artist but omitting insight into the man."

The film holds a score of 7.2/10 on IMDb and a 82% freshness rating on Rotten Tomatoes as of April 2024.

=== Accolades ===
Award	Category	Recipients and nominees	Outcome
CMJ New Music Marathon Film Festival	CMJ Signature Award	Amazing Grace: Jeff Buckley	Winner
DIY Film Festival	Best Film	Amazing Grace: Jeff Buckley	Winner
DIY Film Festival	Best Documentary	Amazing Grace: Jeff Buckley	Winner
San Francisco World Film Festival	Best Music Documentary	Amazing Grace: Jeff Buckley	Winner
