= Grace Around the World =

Video by Jeff Buckley
- Released: June 2, 2009
- Recorded: December 2, 1994 – July 9, 1995; London, England; Frankfurt, Germany; Tokyo, Japan; New Orleans, Louisiana, United States; Chicago, Illinois, USA; Belfort, France; New York City
- Genre: Rock
- Label: Columbia
- Producer: Mary Guibert (executive); Tony Faske

Jeff Buckley chronology
So Real: Songs from Jeff Buckley (2007)	Grace Around the World (2009)	You and I (2016)

Grace Around the World is a DVD and CD by Jeff Buckley compiling live, international performances from the tour promoting his album, Grace. It was released in two packages. The Standard Edition includes a live DVD and an accompanying CD counterpart. The Deluxe Edition (limited edition) includes a bonus DVD of the documentary, Amazing Grace: Jeff Buckley.

== Track listing ==
- Disc One DVD: Grace Around the World
1. "Grace" (BBC Late Show, London, 1/17/95)
2. "So Real" (Live aus dem Südbahnhof, Frankfurt, 2/24/95)
3. "Mojo Pin" (Live aus dem Südbahnhof, Frankfurt, 2/24/95)
4. "What Will You Say" (Live aus dem Südbahnhof, Frankfurt, 2/24/95)
5. "Hallelujah" (MTV Japan, Tokyo, 1/31/95)
6. "Dream Brother" (Howlin' Wolf, New Orleans, 12/2/94)
7. "Eternal Life" (MTV's Most Wanted, London, 3/3/95)
8. "Last Goodbye" (MTV's Most Wanted, London, 3/3/95)
9. "Lover, You Should've Come Over" (JBTV, Chicago, 11/8/94)
10. "Lilac Wine" (MTV Europe, Eurockéennes Festival, Belfort, 7/9/95)

== Bonus features ==
1. "Grace" (MTV, 120 Minutes, New York City, 1/15/95)
2. "So Real" (MTV, 120 Minutes, New York, 1/15/95)
3. "Last Goodbye" (MTV, 120 Minutes, New York, 1/15/95)
4. "Vancouver" (MTV's Most Wanted, London, 3/3/95)
5. "Hallelujah" (music video)
6. "Star Tours" (VH1, Naked Café Behind The Scenes Piece, 1/9/95)
7. "Merri Cyr Bus Interview" (spring 1995)
- Disc Two CD: Grace Around the World (Same performances as Disc One but audio only)
- Disc Three DVD: Amazing Grace: Jeff Buckley (Deluxe Edition only)

== Charts ==
Chart (2009)	Peak position
Belgian Albums (Ultratop Flanders)	83
Belgian Albums (Ultratop Wallonia)	98
French Albums (SNEP)	187
Italian Albums (FIMI)	41
US Billboard 200	125
US Top Rock Albums (Billboard)	48

== Certifications ==
Region	Certification	Certified units/sales
Australia (ARIA) video	Platinum	15,000^{^}
^{^} Shipments figures based on certification alone.

== Personnel ==
- Jeff Buckley – vocals, guitar
- Michael Tighe – guitar
- Mick Grondahl – bass guitar
- Matt Johnson – drums
