= Mystery White Boy =

Live album by Jeff Buckley
- Released: May 9, 2000
- Recorded: February 22, 1995 – February 28, 1996
- Genre: Alternative rock; folk rock
- Length: 78:29
- Label: Columbia
- Producer: Mary Guibert; Michael Tighe

Jeff Buckley chronology
Live in Chicago (2000)	Mystery White Boy (2000)	Live À L'Olympia (2001)

Professional ratings
Review scores
Source	Rating
AllMusic	3/5 stars
The A.V. Club	(Favourable)
Pitchfork Media	(7.5/10)
Slant Magazine	2.5/5 stars

Mystery White Boy (alternatively released as Mystery White Boy: Live '95–'96) is a live album by American singer-songwriter Jeff Buckley released in 2000, three years after Buckley's death. The album, compiled by Buckley's mother Mary Guibert, is a compilation of live DAT recordings taken from the supporting tour for Buckley's album Grace between 1995 and 1996. Despite a mixed critical reception, the album was a commercial success in the United States, hitting #12 on the Top Internet Albums chart released by Billboard.

== Track listing ==
No.	Title	Writer(s)	Recording venue and date	Length
1.	"Dream Brother"	Jeff Buckley, Mick Grøndahl and Matt Johnson	Club Logo, on February 22, 1995	8:48
2.	"I Woke Up in a Strange Place"	Jeff Buckley	Palais Theatre, on February 28, 1996	5:05
3.	"Mojo Pin"	Jeff Buckley and Gary Lucas	Theatre de Fourvière, on July 4, 1995	6:06
4.	"Lilac Wine"	James Shelton	Palais Theatre, on February 28, 1996	5:19
5.	"What Will You Say"	Carla Azar, Jeff Buckley and Chris Dowd	Theatre de Fourvière, on July 4, 1995	7:34
6.	"Last Goodbye"	Jeff Buckley	Olympia, on July 7, 1995	4:58
7.	"Eternal Life"	Jeff Buckley	Palais Theatre, on February 28, 1996	5:57
8.	"Grace"	Jeff Buckley and Gary Lucas	Palais Theatre, on February 28, 1996	5:39
9.	"Moodswing Whiskey"	Jeff Buckley and Michael Tighe	Palais Theatre, on February 28, 1996	5:37
10.	"The Man that Got Away"	Harold Arlen and Ira Gershwin	Great American Music Hall, on May 4, 1995	3:46
11.	"Kanga-Roo"	Alex Chilton	The Phoenician Theatre, on September 6, 1995	10:23
12.	"Hallelujah/I Know It's Over (medley)"	Leonard Cohen/Johnny Marr and Morrissey	King Theatre, on May 7, 1995	9:18

Bonus disc for Europe and Australia
No.	Title	Writer(s)	Recording venue and date	Length
1.	"That's All I Ask"	Horace Ott	Prince Patrick Hotel, on September 2, 1995	5:26
2.	"Lover, You Should've Come Over"	Jeff Buckley	Olympia on July 7, 1995	7:32
3.	"So Real"	Jeff Buckley and Michael Tighe	Nighttown Hall, on February 25, 1995	5:17

Bonus disc for Japan
No.	Title	Writer(s)	Recording venue and date	Length
1.	"So Real"	Jeff Buckley and Michael Tighe	On Air Azabu Studios, on January 28, 1995	4:25
2.	"Last Goodbye"	Jeff Buckley	On Air Azabu Studios, on January 28, 1995	4:38
3.	"Lover, You Should've Come Over"	Jeff Buckley	On Air Azabu Studios, on January 28, 1995	7:21

== Charts ==
Chart	Peak position
US	133
Australia	5
Belgium	5
France	3
Italy	14
Netherlands	88
Switzerland	95
UK	8

== Certifications ==
Region	Certification	Certified units/sales
Australia (ARIA)	Gold	35,000^{^}
^{^} Shipments figures based on certification alone.
