= Live in Chicago (Jeff Buckley video) =

Video by Jeff Buckley
- Released: May 9, 2000
- Recorded: May 13, 1995
- Venue: Cabaret Metro (Chicago, Illinois)
- Genre: Rock
- Length: 108 min.
- Language: English
- Label: Columbia
- Producer: Gary Fisher

Jeff Buckley chronology
Sketches for My Sweetheart the Drunk (1998)	Live in Chicago (2000)	Mystery White Boy (2000)

Live in Chicago is a live DVD by Jeff Buckley, recorded on May 13, 1995 at Cabaret Metro during the Mystery White Boy tour. Soul Coughing co-headlined the show, and only audio of their set was recorded. Originally broadcast on Chicago music video program JBTV, it was released on DVD and VHS on May 9, 2000. In 2007 it was re-released with a different cover to accompany the release of So Real: Songs from Jeff Buckley.

== Track listing ==
=== Live at Cabaret Metro, Chicago ===
1. "Dream Brother" (Jeff Buckley, Mick Grondahl, Matt Johnson)
2. "Lover, You Should've Come Over" (Jeff Buckley)
3. "Mojo Pin" (Jeff Buckley, Gary Lucas)
4. "So Real" (Jeff Buckley, Michael Tighe)
5. "Last Goodbye" (Jeff Buckley)
6. "Eternal Life (Jeff Buckley)
7. "Kick Out the Jams" (MC5)
8. "Lilac Wine" (James Shelton)
9. "What Will You Say" (Jeff Buckley, Carla Azar, Chris Dowd)
10. "Grace" (Jeff Buckley, Gary Lucas)
11. "Vancouver" (instrumental) (Jeff Buckley, Mick Grondahl, Michael Tighe)
12. "Kanga Roo" (Big Star)
13. "Hallelujah" (Leonard Cohen)

=== Bonus material ===
- "So Real" (acoustic) (Recorded November 19, 1994)
- "Last Goodbye" (acoustic) (Recorded November 19, 1994)
- Previously unreleased electronic press kit (EPK)
- Discography

== Personnel ==
- Jeff Buckley – vocals, guitar
- Michael Tighe – guitar
- Mick Grondahl – bass guitar
- Matt Johnson – drums

== Certifications ==
Region	Certification	Certified units/sales
Australia (ARIA) video	5× Platinum	75,000^{^}
^{^} Shipments figures based on certification alone.
