= The Grace EPs =

Compilation album by Jeff Buckley
- Released: November 26, 2002
- Recorded: February 11, 1995 – February 28, 1996
- Genre: Alternative
- Length: 2:32:32
- Label: Columbia
- Producer: Steve Berkowitz; Jeff Buckley; Frans Hagenaars; Clif Norrell; Andy Wallace

Jeff Buckley chronology
Songs to No One 1991–1992 (2002)	The Grace EPs (2002)	So Real: Songs from Jeff Buckley (2007)

Professional ratings
Review scores
Source	Rating
AllMusic	3.5/5 stars
Pitchfork	6.3/10

The Grace EPs is a boxset of Jeff Buckley recordings released in 2002. It contained five EPs, two of which, Peyote Radio Theatre and So Real, had previously been promotional only releases. Live from the Bataclan was released prior to this collection.

== Track listing ==
- Disc One (Peyote Radio Theatre)
1. "Mojo Pin"
2. "Dream Brother" (Nag Champa Mix)
3. "Kanga-Roo"
- Disc Two (So Real a.k.a. Live at Nighttown)
1. "So Real" (Live)
2. "Grace" (Live)
3. "Dream Brother" (Live)
- Disc Three (Live from the Bataclan)
1. "Dream Brother" (Live)
2. "The Way Young Lovers Do" (Live)
  - Also includes a short improv of "Ivo" by the Cocteau Twins at about 9:10
3. "Je n'en connais pas la fin/Hymne à l'amour" (Live)
4. "Hallelujah" (Live)
- Disc Four (The Grace EP)
1. "Grace"
2. "Grace" (Live)
3. "Mojo Pin" (Live)
4. "Hallelujah" (Live)
5. "Tongue"
- Disc Five (Last Goodbye)
1. "Last Goodbye" (Edit)
2. "Mojo Pin" (Live)
3. "Kanga-Roo"
4. "Lost Highway" (Live)

== Charts ==
Weekly chart performance for The Grace EPs
Chart (2025)	Peak position
Croatian International Albums (HDU)	26

Year-end chart performance for The Grace EPs
Chart (2024)	Peak position
Croatian International Albums (HDU)	36
