= Jeff Buckley Live À L'Olympia =

Live À L'Olympia

Live album by Jeff Buckley
- Released: July 3, 2001
- Recorded: July 6–7, 1995
- Venue: Paris Olympia, Paris, France
- Genre: Alternative; folk rock
- Length: 66:27
- Label: Sony International
- Producer: Mary Guibert; Michael Tighe; Michael J. Clouse

Jeff Buckley chronology
Mystery White Boy (2000)	Live À L'Olympia (2001)	Songs to No One 1991–1992 (2002)

Professional ratings
Review scores
Source	Rating
AllMusic	4/5 stars
Pitchfork	8.3/10

Live À L'Olympia is a live album by Jeff Buckley, released in 2001 (see 2001 in music). It is the second posthumous live album released since his death in 1997. The CD consists of performances taken from two separate concerts Buckley and his band played on July 6/7, 1995 at Paris Olympia. The French crowd were very receptive as he was well regarded there, as shown when he was awarded France's prestigious "Grand Prix International du Disque" earlier that year. Buckley paused midway in some of the songs to address the crowd and "Hallelujah" features ad-libbed lyrics in response to their enthusiasm. The album also features a version of a song from Nina Simone's repertoire, "That's All I Ask". It is one of two versions of the song officially released, the other appearing on a three-track bonus disc issued with Australian copies of Buckley's Mystery White Boy live album. Buckley played the song at various concerts on his 1995 European tour.

In addition to the Olympia concert material, the CD features a unique recorded version of "What Will You Say", performed as a duet with Azerbaijani Mugham singer Alim Qasimov. This recording is from the 1995 "Festival of Sacred Music" held in France (July 18, 1995 in Saint-Florent-Le-Vieil, Maine-et-Loire) and features just Buckley on guitar, Qasimov on daf drum and the two taking turns in singing in a competitive vocal performance, which is one aspect of traditional Qawwali.

== Track listing ==
1. "Lover, You Should've Come Over" (Jeff Buckley) – 7:47
2. "Dream Brother" (Jeff Buckley, Mick Grøndahl, Matt Johnson) – 8:00
3. "Eternal Life" (Jeff Buckley) – 5:06
4. "Kick Out the Jams" (Michael Davis, Wayne Kramer, Fred "Sonic" Smith, Dennis Thompson, Rob Tyner) – 3:06
5. "Lilac Wine" (James Shelton) – 5:39
6. "Grace" (Jeff Buckley, Gary Lucas) – 6:08
7. "That's All I Ask" (Horace Ott) – 5:18
8. "Kashmir" (John Bonham, Jimmy Page, Robert Plant) – 1:34
9. "Je n'en connais pas la fin" (Raymond Asso, Marguerite Monnot) – 6:25
10. "Hallelujah" (Leonard Cohen) – 9:35
11. "What Will You Say" (featuring Alim Qasimov) (Carla Azar, Chris Dowd) – 7:49 (Festival of Sacred Music)

== Charts ==
Chart (2001)	Peak position
Australian Albums (ARIA)	26
French Albums (SNEP)	22
Italian Albums (FIMI)	37

Chart (2026)	Peak position
Greek Albums (IFPI)	5
Scottish Albums (OCC)	20
UK Albums (OCC)	100
US Billboard 200	190
US Americana/Folk Albums (Billboard)	11
US Top Rock & Alternative Albums (Billboard)	48
