= Telos (Zedd album) =

Studio album by Zedd
- Released: 30 August 2024
- Length: 37:44
- Label: Interscope
- Producers: Zedd; Ellis; Grey; Mesto

Zedd chronology
Stay + (2017)	Telos (2024)

Singles from Telos
- 1. "Out of Time" Released: 21 June 2024; 2. "Lucky" Released: 9 August 2024; 3. "1685" Released: 4 October 2024; 4. "Automatic Yes" Released: 11 October 2024; 5. "Descensus" Released: 18 October 2024; 6. "Dream Brother" Released: 25 October 2024; 7. "Sona" Released: 8 November 2024; 8. "No Gravity" Released: 15 November 2024; 9. "Shanti" Released: 22 November 2024; 10. "Tangerine Rays" Released: 29 November 2024

Music video
- "Zedd – Telos (Minimix)" on YouTube

Professional ratings
Review scores
Source	Rating
RIFF Magazine	8/10
Rolling Stone	3/5 stars

Telos is the third studio album by electronic music producer Zedd, released on 30 August 2024 through Interscope Records. It features collaborations and guest appearances from Bava, Bea Miller, Ellis, Grey, the Olllam, Remi Wolf, the late Jeff Buckley, Mesto, Dora Jar, John Mayer, and Muse. Production was handled by Zedd himself alongside Ellis, Grey, and Mesto. Preceded by the singles "Out of Time" and "Lucky", it marks Zedd's first album in nine years since True Colors (2015). The album was nominated for Best Dance/Electronic Album at the 67th Grammy Awards, Zedd's 6th nomination, and first in that category.

== Background and promotion ==
In a 2023 recap video uploaded to Instagram, Zedd announced that he was working on a new album, calling the project "the most genuine and deeply personal album I've ever made". In May 2024, during a performance at the EDC Las Vegas music festival, Zedd announced the album's release date using skywriting. The album title and cover art were revealed in an Instagram post uploaded shortly after EDC.

On 21 June 2024, the album's lead single "Out of Time" was released, featuring vocals from Bea Miller. Two weeks later, Zedd announced a partnership with 5 Gum to produce an exclusive one-off show in an undisclosed New York City bodega. The show would include previously unheard songs from Telos. Fans were invited to compete for the event's free tickets by participating in a scavenger hunt, with clues posted by Zedd and 5 Gum's social media accounts every day until the scheduled event on 22 August. Only the first 25 people to visit the bodega ahead of the show would receive free tickets.

The album's second single, "Lucky" (with Remi Wolf), was released on 9 August 2024.

All tracks from the album were released as singles weekly starting in October, with Zedd publishing both the instrumental versions (without vocals) and the a cappella versions (vocals only, without background beats) of the songs.

== Track listing ==
Telos track listing
No.	Title	Writer(s)	Producer(s)	Length
1.	"Out of Time" (featuring Bea Miller)	Anton Zaslavski; Beatrice Miller; Ava Brignol; Gayathri Menon	Zedd	3:42
2.	"Tangerine Rays" (with Ellis featuring Bea Miller)	Zaslavski; Miller; Menon; Ellis Lawrie; Georgia Ku	Zedd; Ellis	4:12
3.	"Shanti" (with Grey)	Zaslavski; Kyle Trewartha; Michael Trewartha; Priyadarshini Shyamsunder	Zedd; Grey; Priya Darshini^{[b]}	3:25
4.	"No Gravity" (featuring Bava)	Zaslavski; Brignol; Chloe Gasparini; Jake Davis; Micah Premnath; Rick Markowitz; Salem Davern	Zedd	3:31
5.	"Sona" (with the Olllam)	Zaslavski; John McSherry; Tyler Duncan; Michael Shimmin; Ross Ainslie	Zedd • the Olllam	3:08
6.	"Lucky" (featuring Remi Wolf)	Zaslavski; Remi Wolf; Lawrie; Ilya Kozich; David Wilson	Zedd; Ellis; Dwilly^{[a]}	2:07
7.	"Dream Brother" (featuring Jeff Buckley)	Jeff Buckley; Matt Johnson; Mick Grøndahl	Zedd	4:58
8.	"Descensus" (with Mesto featuring Dora Jar)	Zaslavski; Lawrie; Emily Joy Green; Melle Kiet	Zedd; Mesto	3:05
9.	"Automatic Yes" (featuring John Mayer)	Zaslavski; John Mayer; Benjamin Giørtz; Ariowa Irosogie	Zedd; Giørtz^{[a]}	3:25
10.	"1685" (featuring Muse)	Zaslavski; Matt Bellamy; Johann Sebastian Bach	Zedd	6:11
Total length:				37:44

Notes

- ^{^[a]} signifies a co-producer
- ^{^[b]} signifies an additional producer

Sample credits

- "Dream Brother" is a remix of the song of the same name as performed by Jeff Buckley, and written by Buckley, Mick Grøndahl, and Matt Johnson.
- "1685" interpolates Johann Sebastian Bach's Prelude and Fugue in C major, BWV 846.

== Personnel ==
Musicians

- Zedd – programming (all tracks), background vocals (tracks 1, 2, 4, 9), vocals (1)
- Jeremy Kittel – viola, violin (all tracks); conductor (track 10)
- Nathaniel Smith – cello (tracks 1–3, 5, 7, 8)
- Bea Miller – vocals (tracks 1, 2)
- Mark Dover – clarinet (track 1)
- Ellis – bass guitar (tracks 2, 6), guitar (6)
- Jacob Collier – background vocals (track 2)
- B. C. Manjunath – percussion (track 3)
- Grey – programming (track 3)
- Michelle Packman – strings (track 3)
- Kyle Trewartha – vocals (track 3)
- Priya Darshini – vocals (track 3)
- Adita Prabhudesai – choir (track 3)
- Arohi Mhatre – choir (track 3)
- Darshana Menon – choir (track 3)
- Janardan Dhatrak – choir (track 3)
- Latesh Puujari – choir (track 3)
- Madhura Paranjape – choir (track 3)
- Savni Bhatt – choir (track 3)
- Sharmishtha Bhatkar – choir (track 3)
- Shrikant Krishna – choir (track 3)
- Shripad Lele – choir (track 3)
- Sudhir Yaduvanshi – choir (track 3)
- Swapna Gothiwrekar – choir (track 3)
- Umesh Joshi – choir (track 3)
- Vijay Dhuri – choir (track 3)
- Vivek Naik – choir (track 3)
- Yashika Sikka – choir (track 3)
- Bava – vocals (track 4)
- The Olllam – low whistle, uilleann pipes (track 5)
- Celina Sharma – background vocals (track 6)
- Charles Redick – background vocals (track 6)
- Chenee Campbell – background vocals (track 6)
- Katrice "Binki" Walker – background vocals (track 6)
- Remi Wolf – vocals (track 6)
- Jeff Buckley – vocals, dulcimer, guitar, harmonium, organ, tabla (track 7)
- Matt Bellamy – guitar (track 8), vocals (10)
- Emmi – background vocals (track 8)
- Mesto – programming (track 8)
- Dora Jar – vocals (track 8)
- John Mayer – vocals, guitar (track 9)
- Chris Wolstenholme – bass guitar (track 10)
- Jacob Warren – double bass (track 10)
- Dominic Howard – drums (track 10)

Technical

- Zedd – mixing
- Mike Marsh – mastering
- Ryan Shanahan – engineering, mixing assistance
- Dónal O'Connor – engineering (track 5)
- Ellis – vocal engineering (track 8)
- Jeremy Kittel – string arrangements
- Ben Kane – additional mixing (track 3)

Creative Direction

- Roseanna Lane – creative direction, art direction, artist

== Charts ==
Chart performance for Telos
Chart (2024)	Peak position
Japanese Digital Albums (Oricon)	18
Japanese Hot Albums (Billboard Japan)	49
UK Dance Albums (Official Charts)	14
US Top Dance Albums (Billboard)	8
