= Forget Her =

Single by Jeff Buckley

from the album Grace: Legacy Edition
- Released: August 23, 2004
- Recorded: Fall 1993
- Studio: Bearsville (Woodstock, New York)
- Genre: Alternative rock
- Length: 5:12
- Label: Columbia
- Songwriter: Jeff Buckley
- Producers: Andy Wallace; Jeff Buckley

Jeff Buckley singles chronology
"Everybody Here Wants You" (1998)	"Forget Her" (2004)	"Hallelujah" (2007)

Official video
- "Forget Her" on YouTube

"Forget Her" is a song by Jeff Buckley. The song was recorded during sessions for Buckley's only completed studio album Grace, but remained officially unreleased until it was featured as the opening track on the bonus disc of Grace: Legacy Edition, a 2004 remastered reissue of the album. The song was subsequently included as a bonus track on several European editions of the standard album. "Forget Her" was subject to much controversy because Buckley specifically chose not to use it for the final release of his debut Grace, opting instead for "So Real". A music video was created for the song, compiled from previously unreleased footage, and was included on the bonus DVD with Grace: Legacy Edition.

In Australia, the song was ranked number 36 on Triple J's Hottest 100 songs of 2004.

== Track listing ==
The song was released as a promotional-only CD single in the United States and Europe to coincide with the release of Grace: Legacy Edition. "Forget Her" was also pressed on blue-colored 7" vinyl and issued with the 2004 vinyl LP reissue of Grace.

All songs written by Jeff Buckley.

U.S. promo CD (no catalog number)

1. "Forget Her" (radio edit) – 4:32
2. "Forget Her" (album version) – 5:12

U.S. 7" vinyl (CS7 54805)

1. "Forget Her" – 5:12
2. "Strawberry Street" – 5:26

== Personnel ==
Credits taken from Forget Her's liner notes.

- Jeff Buckley – vocals, guitars, organ
- Mick Grøndahl – bass
- Matt Johnson – drums
