= Everybody Here Wants You =

Single by Jeff Buckley

from the album Sketches for My Sweetheart the Drunk
- Released: May 18, 1998
- Recorded: 1996
- Genre: Soul; R&B
- Length: 4:47
- Label: Columbia
- Songwriter: Jeff Buckley
- Producers: Jeff Buckley; Tom Verlaine

Jeff Buckley singles chronology
"Eternal Life" (1995)	"Everybody Here Wants You" (1998)	"Forget Her" (2004)

"Everybody Here Wants You" is a song by American musician Jeff Buckley, released as the lead single from the posthumous album Sketches for My Sweetheart the Drunk. In October 2011, NME placed it at number 88 on its list "150 Best Tracks of the Past 15 Years". Kylie Auldist recorded a cover version with The Bamboos for the album Just Say (TRUCD159), as did the French band MIG (vocalist: Djazia Satour) on their 2004 album, Dhikrayat and Lewis Taylor on his 2000 album, Lewis II. The single was nominated for Best Male Rock Vocal Performance at 41st Annual Grammy Awards in 1999.

== Track listing ==
1. "Everybody Here Wants You"
2. "Thousand Fold"
3. "Eternal Life" (Road Version)
4. "Hallelujah" (live from the Bataclan)
5. "Last Goodbye" (live from Sydney)

The Australian version includes an interactive component (the same as that featured on other countries' versions of Sketches for My Sweetheart the Drunk).

== Charts ==
Chart performance for "Everybody Here Wants You"
Chart (1998)	Peak position
Australia (ARIA)	35
UK Singles (OCC)	43

== Certifications ==
Region	Certification	Certified units/sales
New Zealand (RMNZ)	Gold	15,000^{‡}
^{‡} Sales+streaming figures based on certification alone.

== Bibliography ==
- Browne, David. Dream Brother: The Lives and Music of Jeff and Tim Buckley. HarperEntertainment. 2001, 2002.
