= The Sky Is a Landfill =

Song by Jeff Buckley

from the album Sketches for My Sweetheart the Drunk
- Released: May 26th, 1998
- Recorded: 1996, 1997
- Genre: Alternative rock
- Length: 5:09
- Label: Sony Music/Columbia
- Songwriters: Jeff Buckley; Michael Tighe
- Producer: Tom Verlaine

"The Sky Is a Landfill" is the first track on the posthumous Sketches for My Sweetheart the Drunk album release by Jeff Buckley. It was written by Buckley together with bandmate Michael Tighe, whom he had worked with on "So Real". Heavy, rocky and discordant, the track has a different tone from many of Buckley's songs from his debut album Grace. Two live recordings, from performances at the New York's The Knitting Factory and Arlene's Grocery in 1997, can be found online and feature different lyrics.

The song is based on journalist Al Giordano's essay "The Medium Is the Middleman", which Buckley, a friend of Giordano's, adapted: "He applied my critique of the media industry to the music industry, and we had the exact same conclusions," says Giordano. "The concept of the song was that the media turned the airwaves into a garbage dump."

Performance artist Penny Arcade, a friend of Buckley's, had called the song his "magnum opus". The A.V. Club says that the song "seethes with his inimitable flair for epic drama." Pitchfork Media says "it's clear that Buckley was beginning to explore a more discordant and subversive approach", and Rolling Stone notes the "explosive garage-rock theater" in the album generally, referencing the "barking vocal rage and twisted-metal guitars" of the song.

== Personnel ==
Personnel taken from Sketches for My Sweetheart the Drunk CD booklet.

- Jeff Buckley – vocals, guitar
- Michael Tighe – guitar
- Mick Grondahl – bass
- Eric Eidel – drums

Production

- Tom Verlaine - producer
- Andy Wallace – mixing
- Emily Lazar – mastering
