= Bataclan =

Bataclan may refer to:

- Ba-ta-clan, a 1855 operetta by Jacques Offenbach
- Bataclan (theatre), a theatre in Paris named after the operetta
  - Bataclan theatre massacre, November 2015 Paris attacks

== Music ==
- Bataclan 1989, by Maxime Le Forestier
- Live from the Bataclan, a 1996 EP by Jeff Buckley
- Bataclan, a 1998 album by Malavoi
- Le Bataclan, a 2004 unofficial single by Prince
- Le Bataclan '72, a 2004 album by members of The Velvet Underground
- Live au Bataclan, a 2006 album by Jane Birkin
- "Bataclan", a 2016 song by the Cat Empire from Rising with the Sun

== People with the surname ==
- Emilio Bataclan (1940–2026), Filipino Roman Catholic bishop
