= Chicago Metro =

Chicago Metro can refer to:

- Chicago metropolitan area
- Chicago "L", the rapid transit system in Chicago
- Metro Chicago, a music venue
