= Goodbye 20th Century =

Goodbye 20th Century may refer to:

- Goodbye 20th Century: A Biography of Sonic Youth, a 2009 book by David Browne
- Goodbye, 20th Century!, a 1998 Macedonian film
- SYR4: Goodbye 20th Century, a 1999 album by Sonic Youth
