= Live from the Bataclan =

EP (live) by Jeff Buckley
- Released: April 1, 1996
- Recorded: February 11, 1995
- Venue: Bataclan, Paris
- Genre: Alternative; folk rock
- Length: 34:43
- Label: Columbia
- Producer: Steve Berkowitz

Jeff Buckley chronology
Grace (1995)	Live from the Bataclan (1996)	Sketches for My Sweetheart the Drunk (1998)

Professional ratings
Review scores
Source	Rating
AllMusic	4/5 stars

Live from the Bataclan is a live EP by singer-songwriter Jeff Buckley, released in April 1996. It was recorded at the Bataclan in Paris, France, in early 1995.

== Track listing ==
1. "Dream Brother" (Jeff Buckley, Mick Grøndahl, Matt Johnson) – 7:26
2. "The Way Young Lovers Do" (Van Morrison) – 12:12
  - Also includes a short improv of "Ivo" (Cocteau Twins) at about 9:10
3. "Medley" – 5:40
  - "Je n'en connais pas la fin" (Raymond Asso, Marguerite Monnot)
  - "Hymne à l'amour" (Monnot, Édith Piaf)
4. "Hallelujah" (Leonard Cohen) – 9:25

== Personnel ==
Personnel taken from Live from the Bataclan liner notes.

- Jeff Buckley – vocals, guitar
- Michael Tighe – guitar
- Mick Grøndahl – bass
- Matt Johnson – drums

Technical personnel

- Jean Phillipe Thomas – recording
- Vlado Meller – mastering at Sony Music Studios, NYC
- Steve Berkowitz – production
- Merri Cyr – photography
