= My Favourite Album =

2006 Australian television series

My Favourite Album was a nationwide poll conducted by the Australian Broadcasting Corporation to discover Australia's most popular album. Voting was by phone, SMS or over the ABC's website between 20 September 2006 to midnight on 18 October 2006. Much of the poll's promotion was through the ABC's music trivia program Spicks and Specks and ABC's youth radio station Triple J. The result, as voted by more than 100,000 viewers, had Pink Floyd's The Dark Side of the Moon voted Australia's favourite album. The highest Australian artist on the list is Midnight Oil with 10, 9, 8, 7, 6, 5, 4, 3, 2, 1 at #23.

The "Top Ten" results of the voting was aired at 7.30pm on Sunday 3 December 2006, on ABC TV, before a studio audience and reviewed by a panel consisting of comedian Judith Lucy, Australian Idol judge Ian Dickson, Spiderbait vocalist Mark "Kram" Maher, singer Renée Geyer, and comedian Chas Licciardello. Between segments of the show, comedian Alan Brough discussed unusual trivia arising from the poll. The show was hosted by Triple J presenter Myf Warhurst. The 90-minute show was rescreened at 3pm on 7 January 2007.

== Top 10 ==
The top 10 albums voted are:

1. The Dark Side of the Moon – Pink Floyd
2. Grace – Jeff Buckley
3. OK Computer – Radiohead
4. Abbey Road – The Beatles
5. Sgt. Pepper's Lonely Hearts Club Band – The Beatles
6. Nevermind – Nirvana
7. Led Zeppelin IV – Led Zeppelin
8. Blood Sugar Sex Magik – Red Hot Chili Peppers
9. Bat Out of Hell – Meat Loaf
10. The Joshua Tree – U2

== See also ==
- My Favourite Book
- My Favourite Film
- My Favourite Australian
