= My Favourite Film =

My Favourite Film was a television special broadcast on the ABC on 4 December 2005. After public voting took place on the show's website, the special listed the top ten most popular films as chosen by voters, and these films were discussed and their rankings debated by a panel hosted by Margaret Pomeranz, a long-time ABC film critic, which included Judith Lucy, Stuart MacGill, Sigrid Thornton, Chris Taylor, and Richard Roxburgh.

== The Top Ten Films ==
1. The Lord of the Rings
2. Amélie
3. Blade Runner
4. The Shawshank Redemption
5. Donnie Darko
6. Star Wars
7. Pulp Fiction
8. The Princess Bride
9. Gone with the Wind
10. Fight Club

== See also ==
- My Favourite Album
- My Favourite Australian
- My Favourite Book
