= Michelle Sy =

American film producer

- Occupation: Film producer

Michelle Sy is an American film producer and executive producer. She started her career as a production assistant, working on films such as Good Will Hunting and The Mighty. Later on in her career she moved into producing films herself. Her most successful film to date is Finding Neverland; a J. M. Barrie biographical film made in 2004. Other works include 2007 film Fan-Demanium and 2004's My Name Is Modesty: A Modesty Blaise Adventure. In addition, 2002 release Stolen Summer, which Sy produced, was the first independent film stemming from Project Greenlight, a film competition made as a TV series with Ben Affleck and Matt Damon. Sy appeared in the series, reflecting its "behind the scenes" nature. Sy is producing a biopic about late musician Jeff Buckley with the singer's mother, Mary Guibert, which as of May 2008 is in the scripting stage.

== Producer credits ==
- Fan-Demanium (2007) (producer)
- My Name Is Modesty: A Modesty Blaise Adventure (2004) (executive producer)
- Finding Neverland (2004) (executive producer)
- Stolen Summer (2002) (executive producer)
