= All Flowers in Time Bend Towards the Sun =

Unreleased duet by Jeff Buckley and Elizabeth Fraser

Song by Jeff Buckley and Elizabeth Fraser
- Released: Unreleased (demo)
- Recorded: c. 1994–1995

"All Flowers in Time Bend Towards the Sun" is an unreleased duet by American singer Jeff Buckley and Scottish singer Elizabeth Fraser of Cocteau Twins. A rough demo, recorded during the pair's mid-1990s relationship, has circulated online but has never been officially issued. In 2009, Fraser called the recording "unfinished" and said she did not want it to be heard, but then added, "Maybe I won't always think that".

== Background and recording ==
Buckley and Fraser recorded the song around 1994–1995, during their romantic relationship. Buckley's biographer Jeff Apter described the recording as "a lovely, languid ballad". The singers alternate verses, and faint laughter from Fraser can be heard before she sings.

== Leak and circulation ==
Following Buckley's death in 1997, the duet leaked and circulated among fans and later video-sharing sites. Subsequent reporting has treated it as an unofficial but persistent item in Buckley's posthumous circulation.

== Reception and legacy ==
Despite its unofficial status, the track has drawn critical attention. Dazed listed the duet among Buckley's "most underrated deep cuts".

The song was incorporated into The Last Goodbye, a 2013 stage adaptation of Romeo and Juliet built around Buckley's music, in place of the canonical balcony scene.

An art exhibition at Almine Rech in 2025 took its title from the song, citing the phrase's resonance and imagery.

== Credits ==
- Jeff Buckley – vocal (demo)
- Elizabeth Fraser – vocal (demo)
