= Metro Chicago =

Music venue in Chicago, Illinois, US

Coordinates: 41°56′59″N 87°39′32″W

Metro
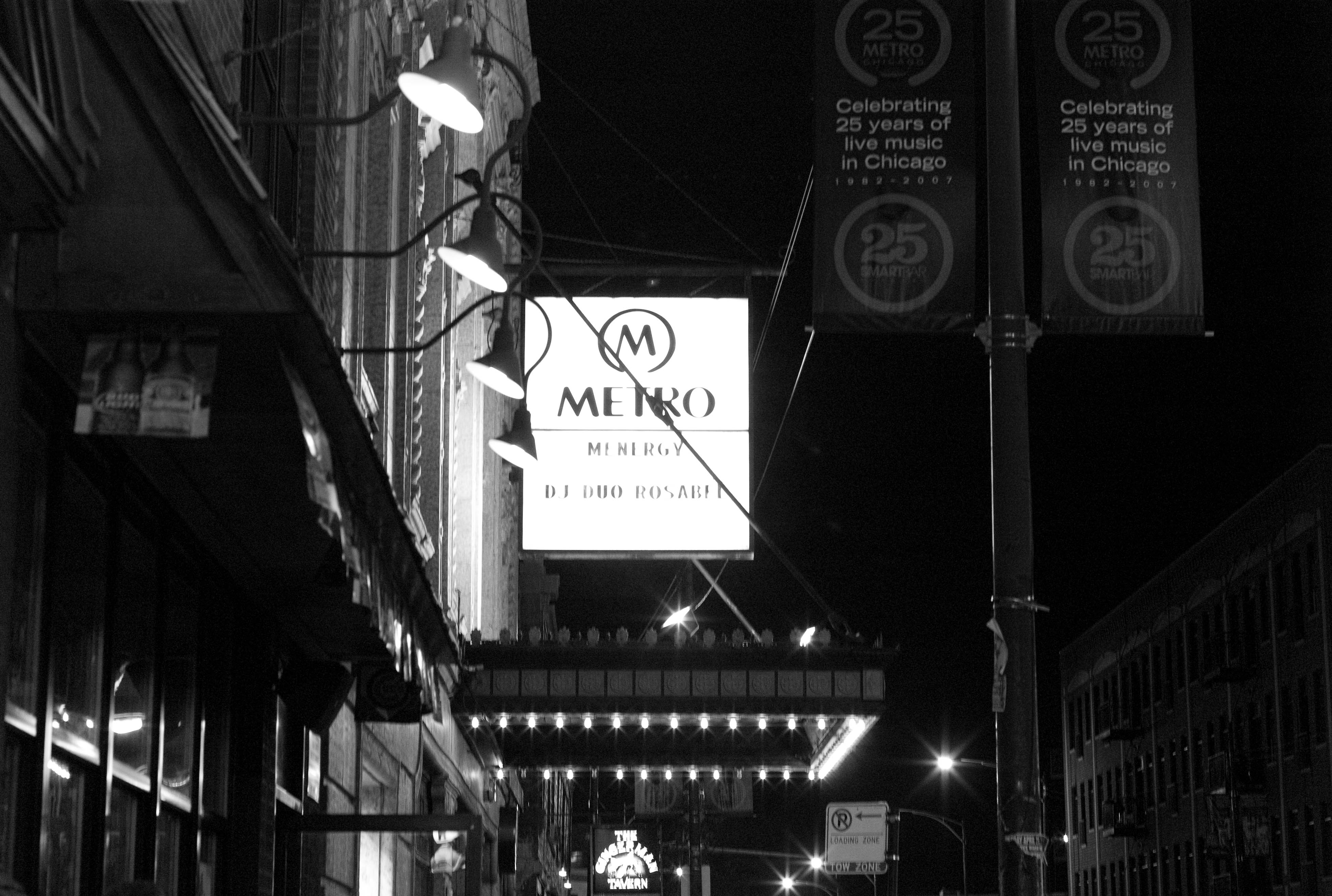
- Signage of venue (c. 2008)
- Interactive map of Metro
- Former names: Stages Music Hall (1979–82); Cabaret Metro (1982–92)
- Address: 3730 N Clark St; Chicago, Illinois 60613-3810
- Location: Wrigleyville
- Owner: Joe Shanahan
- Capacity: 1,100; 400 (Smart Bar)

Construction
- Built: 1927 (99 years ago)
- Opened: 1979 (47 years ago)

Website
- metrochicago.com

Metro (formerly the Stages Music Hall and Cabaret Metro) is a concert hall in Chicago, Illinois, United States, that plays host to a variety of local, regional and national emerging bands and musicians. The Metro was first opened in 1982. The capacity is 1,100, divided between the main floor and the balcony. The building housing Metro also houses Smart Bar underneath the main venue.

== History ==
In the late 1970s, Joe Shanahan, having experienced the art, music and dance culture in New York City, created a club to host creative acts in Chicago. Shanahan was directed to the Northside Auditorium Building. The building was originally built in 1927 as a Swedish Community Center. When Shanahan came across it, it was home to a jazz/folk club, Stages.

Shanahan opened "Smart Bar" in July 1982 as a dance club, mixing a variety of the new genres of the time. Smart Bar was on the fourth floor of the building, which now houses the offices of the Metro staff. DJ Frankie Knuckles performed regularly, while DJ Joe Smooth "Promised Land" played Thursday and Saturday evenings primetime until 1985. Ministry and similar bands performed their new industrial music by playing tapes of newly recorded songs. In late July 1982, Shanahan, through his production company Latest Creations, booked and promoted a concert for R.E.M. The July 25 show was a success, and Shanahan began booking the club's weekend slots, gradually taking over the main floor of Stages. He then moved Smart Bar from the fourth floor to the basement of the building. Metro, then called "Stages Music Hall", was re-opened as a live music venue in its current space.

At first, the Metro primarily hosted local bands, like Naked Raygun and Big Black, but it quickly began to book national acts, including New York's Sonic Youth, Samhain and the Ramones, California's X, Metallica and The Bangles, Minneapolis' The Replacements, Hüsker Dü and Soul Asylum, R.E.M., Guadalcanal Diary, and Pylon, and Texas' Butthole Surfers. During the Metro's first year of business, it hosted New Order, Depeche Mode, Killing Joke, Billy Idol and Orchestral Manoeuvres in the Dark.

Metro booked many early industrial music bands, including Cabaret Voltaire, KMFDM, and Einstürzende Neubauten.

During this time, Metro began a long-standing relationship with Chicago's Jam Productions.

In the 1990s the club booked grunge and alternative music. Material Issue, Smashing Pumpkins, Urge Overkill, Liz Phair and Veruca Salt began their careers in Metro. Seattle bands included Nirvana, Soundgarden and Mudhoney, and Los Angeles bands included Jane's Addiction, Perry Farrell and Hole. Seattle-based Pearl Jam recorded a live album at Metro on March 28, 1992. Bands from Britain, such as Oasis and the Manic Street Preachers, played their early US gigs at the Metro. The original lineup of the Smashing Pumpkins played their first and last gigs at the Metro. The Metro also hosted one of the last Blind Melon shows with Shannon Hoon on September 27, 1995, which was filmed and released in 2005 under the title Live at the Metro: September 27, 1995. Hoon died of a drug overdose less than a month later. Additionally, Jeff Buckley filmed Live in Chicago at the Metro, his only concert DVD before dying. In addition, before originally calling it quits in 1999, Braid recorded one of their farewell shows at Metro in August 1999, released in 2000 as “Killing a Camera”. Alkaline Trio opened the show. The live album from the Metro that night was released as “Lucky To be Alive”.

Other artists and bands that performed at the venue included Metallica, James Brown, Iggy Pop, George Clinton, Joe Strummer, Prince, The White Stripes, Alkaline Trio, The Killers, No Doubt, They Might Be Giants, Phish, Disturbed, Chevelle, Travis, Jimmy Eat World, Interpol, The Strokes, The Frames, Jack Johnson, Kanye West, Pearl Jam, Atmosphere, Aesop Rock, Moby, The Faint, Fatboy Slim, Arctic Monkeys, Yeah Yeah Yeahs, Plain White T's, The Brian Jonestown Massacre, The Academy Is..., Chance the Rapper, Green Day, Fall Out Boy, Catch 22 and Kill Hannah. Local bands can get booked at Metro through the same method used in the club's earliest days, sending a demo. Bob Dylan performed two shows at Metro to celebrate the club's 15th anniversary. Chicago band Alkaline Trio played 30 sold out shows at the venue.

On July 22, 2007, Metro celebrated its 25th anniversary, with a free public concert at Millennium Park's Jay Pritzker Pavilion with the Decemberists backed by the Grant Park Orchestra. On July 21, 2007, Metro held an employee reunion and public party to count down the hours to the official anniversary at midnight on July 22, 2007.

On October 11, 2007, Metro's owner Joe Shanahan was awarded a Recording Academy Honors from the Chicago Chapter of the Recording Academy in recognition of Metro's 25 years.
