= Dream Brother: The Lives and Music of Jeff and Tim Buckley =

2001 book by David Browne

- Author: David Browne
- Language: English
- Genre: Biography
- Publisher: HarperCollins
- Publication date: February 1, 2001
- Publication place: United States
- Media type: Print (paperback)
- ISBN: 1-85702-989-5 (2001 edition)

Dream Brother: The Lives and Music of Jeff and Tim Buckley is a biography by the American author, journalist, and former Entertainment Weekly critic David Browne. First published on February 1, 2001, the book is a dual biography of Tim Buckley and his son Jeff Buckley, both American singer-songwriters. The book outlines the lives and deaths of the musicians in chapters which alternate between father and son. As part of his research, Browne interviewed over 100 friends, colleagues, and family members. Kirkus Reviews gave the book an indifferent review, saying it would please fans, but would hold little interest for others.
