= Closed on Account of Rabies =

Closed On Account of Rabies

Compilation album by Various Artists
- Released: 1997
- Genre: Spoken word
- Length: 2:22:29
- Label: Mercury / Universal
- Producer: Hal Willner

Professional ratings
Review scores
Source	Rating
AllMusic	3/5 stars

Closed On Account of Rabies (1997) is a double-CD with poems and tales of Edgar Allan Poe performed by various artists, and produced by Hal Willner. It is one of numerous multi-artist tribute albums that Willner has produced, as well as one of the many spoken word albums he has produced.

== CD 1 "Burglars Singing in the Cellar" ==
1. "Alone" Read by Marianne Faithfull - 1:30
2. "The Raven" Read by Christopher Walken - 8:30
3. "The Tell-Tale Heart" Read by Iggy Pop - 14:26
4. "The Conqueror Worm" Read by Ken Nordine - 3:00
5. "The Black Cat" Read by Diamanda Galás - 36:58
6. "For Annie" Read by Gavin Friday - 5:21
7. "To Helen" Sung by Ed Sanders - 2:29

== CD 2 "The Devil's Brew" ==
1. "The Haunted Palace" Sung by Ed Sanders - 5:42
2. "Ulalume" Read by Jeff Buckley - 6:13
3. "Berenice" Read by Dr. John - 27:42
4. "The City in the Sea" Performed by Deborah Harry and the Jazz Passengers - 8:04
5. "Annabel Lee" Read by Marianne Faithfull - 2:24
6. "The Masque of the Red Death" Read by Gabriel Byrne - 18:13
7. "The Raven" Read by Abel Ferrara - 1:57

The album is produced by Hal Willner and Michael Minzer is the executive producer. Cover art by Ralph Steadman. It is dedicated to Jeff Buckley and Allen Ginsberg, both of whom died shortly before the CD went to press.

Catalog No.: 536480 | UPC: 731453648029
