= Goodbye 20th Century: A Biography of Sonic Youth =

2009 biography on the American alternative rock band Sonic Youth

- Author: David Browne
- Language: English
- Subject: Sonic Youth
- Genre: Biography
- Published: June 2, 2009
- Publisher: Da Capo Press

Goodbye 20th Century: A Biography of Sonic Youth is a 2009 biography on the American alternative rock band Sonic Youth, written by David Browne. It was published by Da Capo Press.
