= Eternal Life (song) =

Single by Jeff Buckley

from the album Grace
- Released: August 1995
- Recorded: 1993
- Studio: Bearsville (Woodstock, New York)
- Genre: Hard rock; grunge
- Length: 4:52
- Label: Columbia
- Songwriter: Jeff Buckley
- Producer: Andy Wallace

Jeff Buckley singles chronology
"So Real" (1995)	"Eternal Life" (1995)	"Everybody Here Wants You" (1998)

"Eternal Life" is a song composed by Jeff Buckley, released as the fourth and final single from his album Grace. It is believed to have been influenced by a long-time love for Led Zeppelin's music and a wish to emulate them in this song. The track is something of an exception on the album, featuring aggressive, overdriven guitar and bass riffs that contrast with the more intimate, melodic format that otherwise characterizes the album. "Eternal Life" can also be found on his 1993 EP Live at Sin-é.

Captured on the Live at Sin-é release, is an explanation as to the meaning of this song:

This is a song about... it's an angry song. Life's too short and too complicated for people behind desks and people behind masks to be ruining other people's lives, initiating force against other people's lives, on the basis of their income, their color, their class, their religious beliefs, their whatever...

In Buckley's own words, "Eternal Life" was inspired by anger over "the man that shot Martin Luther King, World War II, slaughter in Guyana and the Manson murders."

== Track listing ==
All songs written by Jeff Buckley.

1. "Eternal Life"
2. "Eternal Life" (road version)
3. "Last Goodbye" (live and acoustic in Japan)
4. "Lover, You Should've Come Over" (live and acoustic in Japan)

== Personnel ==
Credits taken from Eternal Life and Grace CD booklets.

- Jeff Buckley – vocals, guitars
- Mick Grøndahl – bass
- Matt Johnson – drums
- Karl Berger – string arrangements
