= David Browne (journalist) =

American journalist and author

- Born: May 19
- Occupations: Music journalist; biographer
- Writing career
- Period: 1982–present

David Browne (born May 19) is an American journalist and author. He is currently a senior writer at Rolling Stone, where he has been a contributor since 2008. He was the resident music critic at Entertainment Weekly between 1990 and 2006. He was an editor at Music & Sound Output magazine and a music critic at the New York Daily News before EW. He has written articles for a variety of publications, including The New York Times, Spin, The New Republic and Time, as well as stories for NPR.

Browne is the author of seven books: Dream Brother: The Lives and Music of Jeff and Tim Buckley (HarperCollins, 2001), a dual father/son biography of musicians Jeff Buckley and Tim Buckley; Amped: How Big Air, Big Dollars and a New Generation Took Sports to the Extreme (Bloomsbury, 2004), a history of extreme sports; Goodbye 20th Century: A Biography of Sonic Youth (Da Capo, 2008); Fire and Rain: The Beatles, Simon & Garfunkel, James Taylor, CSNY and the Lost Story of 1970 (Da Capo, 2011); So Many Roads: The Life and Times of the Grateful Dead (Da Capo, 2015); Crosby, Stills, Nash & Young: The Wild, Definitive Saga of Rock's Greatest Supergroup (Da Capo, 2019), and Talkin' Greenwich Village: The Heady Rise and Slow Fall of America’s Bohemian Music Capital. Crosby, Stills, Nash & Young received a starred review in Kirkus and was included in the Summer Reading issue of The New York Times in May 2019.

Browne was born and raised in New Jersey and attended New York University, where he received a bachelor's degree in journalism, with a minor in music. He lives in Manhattan.
