= Dream Brother =

Song by Jeff Buckley

from the album Grace
- Released: August 23, 1994
- Studio: Bearsville Studios (Woodstock, New York)
- Genre: Alternative rock; post-rock; psychedelic rock
- Length: 5:26
- Label: Columbia
- Songwriters: Jeff Buckley; Mick Grøndahl; Matt Johnson
- Producer: Andy Wallace

"Dream Brother" is a song by American musician Jeff Buckley, featured on his only studio album Grace. Written by Buckley, bassist Mick Grøndahl and drummer Matt Johnson, it was written as an urge for a friend of his, Chris Dowd of Fishbone fame, not to walk out on his pregnant girlfriend in a similar way to Buckley's own father, Tim Buckley, as evidenced in the chorus, "Don't be like the one who made me so old/Don't be like the one who left behind his name/'Cause they're waiting for you like I waited for mine/And nobody ever came".

Jeff Buckley notes:

It's a song about a friend of mine, who's led a rather excessive life... He is in trouble. This song is for him. I know what self-destruction can lead to, and I have tried to warn him. But I am one big hypocrite because when I called him up and told him about the song I'd written, that same night I took an overdose of hash and woke up the next day feeling terrible. It is very hard not to give in to one's negative feelings. Life is total chaos.

The title was also used for a biography of Jeff and Tim Buckley, written posthumously by journalist David Browne, as well as an album featuring covers of some of their most famous by several artists including The Magic Numbers and Sufjan Stevens.

== Covers ==
The song was covered by English progressive metal band TesseracT on their Perspective EP. The song has been performed by jazz pianist Brad Mehldau in various arrangements over the years. A version appears on is 10 Years Solo Live record. In October 2024, the song was remixed by Russian-German electronic music producer Zedd on Telos.
