= Sketches for My Sweetheart the Drunk =

Compilation album by Jeff Buckley
- Released: May 11, 1998
- Recorded: 1996–1997
- Studio: New York; Memphis
- Genre: Alternative rock; experimental rock
- Length: 91:44
- Label: Columbia
- Producer: Tom Verlaine; Nicholas Hill

Jeff Buckley chronology
| Live from the Bataclan (1995) | Sketches for My Sweetheart the Drunk (1998) | Live in Chicago (2000) |

Singles from Sketches for My Sweetheart the Drunk
- 1. "Everybody Here Wants You" Released: May 18, 1998

Sketches for My Sweetheart the Drunk is a compilation album by the American singer-songwriter Jeff Buckley, released by Columbia Records on May 11, 1998, a year after his death. It comprises recordings Buckley made while working on his second album, My Sweetheart the Drunk, with the producer Tom Verlaine in 1996 and 1997. It was released after negotiation with Buckley's mother, the owner of his estate, who feared that Sony was trying to exploit his legacy. It received positive reviews.

== Recording and release ==
Buckley released his debut album, Grace, in 1994. He began recording his second album with the working title My Sweetheart the Drunk in late 1996 with the producer Tom Verlaine. Unsatisfied with the results, Buckley discarded the recordings and went to Memphis with his band to start anew. On the evening of May 29, 1997, Buckley went swimming in the Mississippi River and drowned.

As Buckley left no will, his estate transferred to his mother, Mary Guibert. Soon after Buckley's memorial ceremonies, Guibert learned that Sony was in the process of mixing and mastering the Verlaine recordings for release. This angered Guibert and Buckley's band, as Buckley had not wanted to release them. Through her lawyer, Guibert sent a cease-and-desist letter to Sony.

Sony had not made back its investment on its record deal with Buckley and was eager to release a new album. However, Guibert would allow them to release only material that was "worth using". They compromised on a double album, with the Verlaine recordings on one disc and Buckley's later demos on the other. Guibert did not allow Sony to alter the demos, saying: "If this was his body here and we were preparing it for his funeral, we would not put him in a suit. We would put him in a flower shirt and some black jeans and his Doc Martens and leave his hair all mussed up."

== Reception ==
Professional ratings
Review scores
| Source | Rating |
|---|---|
| AllMusic | 4/5 stars |
| Entertainment Weekly | A− |
| The Guardian | 4/5 stars |
| Los Angeles Times | 4/4 stars |
| NME | 8/10 |
| Pitchfork | 8.0/10 |
| Rolling Stone | 4/5 stars |
| Slant Magazine | 4/5 stars |
| Spin | 4/10 |
| USA Today | 3.5/4 stars |

My Sweetheart the Drunk received positive reviews. Biographers and critics wrote that Buckley had been "reaching fruitfully in multiple directions". The biographers Dave Lory and Jim Irvin identified influences from Siouxsie and the Banshees on "Nightmares by the Sea" and "Witches Rave". The Los Angeles Times cited John Lennon and Nusrat Fateh Ali Khan as references. The reviewer Steve Hochman likened the track "Everybody Here Wants You" to a "70s-ish soul experiment worthy of Marvin Gaye or Al Green", and linked "New Year's Prayer" to Led Zeppelin's "Kashmir".

The second disc includes a cover of "Back in NYC" by Genesis. In 2011, the Genesis keyboardist, Tony Banks, said: "I was very surprised that he did the whole thing including the funny bits. If I'd been him I would have just stuck to the main thing. But it was fun and quite sweet really, it was kind of 'why not?'."

== Track listing ==
All tracks composed by Jeff Buckley, except where noted.

Disc one
| No. | Title | Writer(s) | Length |
|---|---|---|---|
| 1. | "The Sky Is a Landfill" | Buckley, Michael Tighe | 5:09 |
| 2. | "Everybody Here Wants You" | | 4:46 |
| 3. | "Opened Once" | | 3:30 |
| 4. | "Nightmares by the Sea" | | 3:53 |
| 5. | "Yard of Blonde Girls" | Audrey Clark, Lori Kramer, Inger Lorre | 4:07 |
| 6. | "Witches' Rave" | | 4:40 |
| 7. | "New Year's Prayer" | | 4:40 |
| 8. | "Morning Theft" | | 3:39 |
| 9. | "Vancouver" | Buckley, Mick Grøndahl, Tighe | 3:12 |
| 10. | "You & I" | | 5:37 |
| Total length: | | | 43:13 |

Disc two
| No. | Title | Writer(s) | Length |
|---|---|---|---|
| 1. | "Nightmares by the Sea" (original mix) | | 3:50 |
| 2. | "New Year's Prayer" (original mix) | | 4:10 |
| 3. | "Haven't You Heard" | | 4:07 |
| 4. | "I Know We Could Be So Happy Baby (If We Wanted to Be)" | | 4:27 |
| 5. | "Murder Suicide Meteor Slave" | | 5:55 |
| 6. | "Back in N.Y.C." | Tony Banks, Phil Collins, Peter Gabriel, Steve Hackett, Mike Rutherford | 7:36 |
| 7. | "Demon John" | Jeff Buckley, Michael Tighe | 5:13 |
| 8. | "Your Flesh Is So Nice" | | 3:37 |
| 9. | "Jewel Box" | | 3:37 |
| 10. | "Satisfied Mind" (recorded 1992.10.11 WFMU) | Red Hayes, Jack Rhodes | 5:59 |
| Total length: | | | 48:31 |

International (non-US) editions of disc two include the track "Gunshot Glitter" (Jeff Buckley) as track 7, moving tracks 7–10 of the US edition down a place for a total of 21 tracks.

== Personnel ==
- Jeff Buckley – vocals, guitar
- Michael Tighe – guitar
- Mick Grøndahl – bass
- Parker Kindred – drums
- Eric Eidel – drums on "The Sky Is A Landfill", "Morning Theft", and "Vancouver"

Technical

- Tom Verlaine – producer
- Nicholas Hill – producer on "Satisfied Mind"
- Jeff Buckley, Michael J. Clouse, Ray Martin, Irene Trudel – engineer
- Jim Caruana, Joe Lizzi, David Seitz – assistant engineer
- Tom Cadley, Michael J. Clouse, Mary Guibert, Tom Verlaine, Andy Wallace – mixing
- Steve Sisco – mixing assistant
- Nicky Lindeman, Gail Marowitz – art direction, design
- Merri Cyr – photography
- Bill Flanagan, Mary Guibert – liner notes

== Charts ==
=== Weekly charts ===
1998 weekly chart performance for Sketches for My Sweetheart the Drunk
| Chart (1998) | Peak position |
|---|---|
| Australian Albums (ARIA) | 1 |
| Belgian Albums (Ultratop Flanders) | 13 |
| Dutch Albums (Album Top 100) | 62 |
| European Albums (Eurotipsheet) | 13 |
| French Albums (SNEP) | 6 |
| German Albums (Offizielle Top 100) | 93 |
| Irish Albums (IFPI) | 3 |
| New Zealand Albums (RMNZ) | 7 |
| Norwegian Albums (VG-lista) | 10 |
| Swedish Albums (Sverigetopplistan) | 29 |
| UK Albums (OCC) | 7 |
| US Billboard 200 | 64 |

2025–2026 weekly chart performance for Sketches for My Sweetheart the Drunk
| Chart (2025–2026) | Peak position |
|---|---|
| Greek Albums (IFPI) | 38 |

=== Year-end charts ===
1998 year-end chart performance for Sketches for My Sweetheart the Drunk
| Chart (1998) | Position |
|---|---|
| Australian Albums (ARIA) | 52 |
| Belgian Albums (Ultratop Flanders) | 96 |

== Certifications ==
Certifications for Sketches for My Sweetheart the Drunk
| Region | Certification | Certified units/sales |
|---|---|---|
| Australia (ARIA) | 2× Platinum | 140,000^{^} |
^{^} Shipments figures based on certification alone.
