= Grace (Jeff Buckley album) =

1994 studio album

Studio album by Jeff Buckley
- Released: August 15, 1994
- Studios: Bearsville (Woodstock, New York); Quantum Sound (Hackensack, New Jersey); Soundtrack (New York City)
- Genres: Alternative rock; folk rock; jazz rock
- Length: 51:48
- Label: Columbia
- Producers: Andy Wallace; Jeff Buckley

Jeff Buckley chronology
Live at Sin-é (1993)	Grace (1994)	Live from the Bataclan (1995)

Singles from Grace
- 1. "Grace" Released: August 1994; 2. "Last Goodbye" Released: May 8, 1995; 3. "So Real" Released: June 1995 (Aus); 4. "Eternal Life" Released: August 1995

Grace is the only studio album by the American singer-songwriter Jeff Buckley, released in the UK and Europe on August 15, 1994 and in the US on August 23, 1994 by Columbia Records. It was produced by Buckley and Andy Wallace.

After moving from Los Angeles to New York City in 1991, Buckley amassed a following through his performances at Sin-é, a cafe in the East Village, and signed to Columbia in 1993. He recorded Grace primarily in Bearsville Studios in Woodstock, New York, with musicians including Gary Lucas, Mick Grondahl, Michael Tighe and Matt Johnson. It includes cover versions of the jazz standard "Lilac Wine", the hymn "Corpus Christi Carol", and the 1984 Leonard Cohen song "Hallelujah".

Grace reached number 149 on the US Billboard 200, below Columbia's expectations, and initially received mixed reviews. After Buckley's death in 1997, its critical standing grew and it was praised by musicians including Jimmy Page, Robert Plant, Bob Dylan and David Bowie. By 2011, it had sold two million copies worldwide, and in 2016 it was certified platinum in the US.

In 2008, "Hallelujah" became Buckley's first number one on Billboard's Hot Digital Songs and reached number two in the UK singles chart. In 2014, "Hallelujah" was inducted into the American Library of Congress' National Recording Registry. In 2026, "Lover, You Should've Come Over" reached number 84 on the Billboard Hot 100 after it became popular on the social media service TikTok. Rolling Stone included Grace in its lists of the 500 greatest albums and named "Grace" and Buckley's version of "Hallelujah" in its lists of the 500 greatest songs.

== Background ==
Buckley moved from Los Angeles to New York City in 1991, where he met the guitarist Gary Lucas and wrote the songs "Grace" and "Mojo Pin" with him. He performed both songs during his brief time as a member of Lucas's band Gods and Monsters.

After leaving the band, Buckley performed regularly at Sin-é, a cafe in the East Village, Manhattan. He built a following and attracted attention from major record labels. In October 1992, Buckley signed a record contract with Columbia Records. His debut EP, Live at Sin-é, was released in 1993. According to Rolling Stone, the EP was designed to "shrewdly market a hot new performer's street cred".

Buckley assembled a band and delayed recording his debut album until he felt he had found the right musicians. He met the bassist Mick Grondahl at a concert at Columbia University, and recruited him following a jam session at Buckley's apartment. Buckley's girlfriend, Rebecca Moore, introduced him to the drummer Matt Johnson, and Buckley invited him to audition at a rehearsal, where they created the structure for "Dream Brother". The band began recording Grace soon after. Johnson said it was "really scary" to go from meeting someone to recording so quickly.

== Recording ==
Grace was produced, engineered and mixed by Andy Wallace and recorded in Bearsville Studios in Woodstock, New York. Buckley experimented extensively with arrangements and recording techniques. He found the recording process contrary to his improvisational performance style, and said later: "It's not like a live show where you play it and it just disappears into the air like smoke. It's like painting, sound painting. It's in a crystalized form, so it's very nerve-wracking: which brain cell do I put down here forever and ever?" Karl Berger, a longtime Woodstock resident, wrote the string arrangements with Buckley and conducted the orchestra for recording sessions.

Wallace recalled Buckley as among the most talented musicians he had met, with an abundance of ideas. However, he was "very scattered", had difficulty focusing and required direction. Recording was disrupted by a negative review of Live at Sin-é in Newsday, which likened his voice to Michael Bolton and wrote that he was derivative of "black idioms ... awkwardly reach[ing] for a balance of emotion and technique, eventually relying on sheer voice of will, oversinging, flaking out". Wallace said Buckley was "almost apoplectic" about the criticism and stopped work for two days.

Lucas contributed guitar to the songs he co-wrote, "Grace" and "Mojo Pin". As Buckley had not completed enough original songs for an album, he recorded three covers: the jazz standard "Lilac Wine", originally by James Shelton; the hymn "Corpus Christi Carol", based on an arrangement by Benjamin Britten; and the 1984 Leonard Cohen song "Hallelujah", based on the cover by John Cale. Buckley recorded more than 20 takes of "Hallelujah", with the final version edited together from several recordings.

Near the end of the sessions, Buckley presented another song, "Forget Her", and the band quickly recorded it. Columbia felt the song had commercial potential, but Buckley and the band were unsure. In early 1994, when Grace was almost complete, Buckley enlisted another guitarist, Moore's childhood friend Michael Tighe. During one rehearsal, Tighe played a descending chord progression that Buckley developed into "So Real". While recording B-sides for the Grace singles, the band quickly recorded "So Real" and Buckley used it to replace "Forget Her". Tighe recalled: "He got really excited and was like, 'Oh, my record is saved because I have this song 'So Real' now ... He felt that it tipped the balance of that record to the favorable side of the spectrum, aesthetically." The decision concerned the executives, but Buckley insisted. Buckley recorded overdubs at studios in Manhattan and New Jersey. Grace took around six months to complete.

== Cover ==
The cover photograph was taken by Buckley's friend Merri Cyr. It depicts Buckley with his eyes closed, holding a microphone and wearing a women's sequinned jacket he purchased from a thrift store. Buckley was listening to a playback of "Dream Brother" when the photo was taken. The Columbia executives felt it sent the wrong message; some felt he looked like the new wave singer Adam Ant, while the Sony head, Don Ienner, said he looked like a lounge singer. Buckley rejected Columbia's suggested alternatives, saying he liked the peaceful expression on his face listening to music. Cyr said the photo captured Buckley's "split personality" and the conflict he felt seeking media exposure on a major label while "wanting to act like he was on an indie label".

== Music ==
Entertainment Weekly described Grace as a blend of "choirboy cabaret" and Led Zeppelin guitar, with vocals that "spiral into spasms of romantic despair". Uncut said it combined "androgynous vocals, '70s rock, power chords and heroic drumming". The lyrics for "Grace" were inspired by Buckley's separation from his ex-girlfriend at the airport before moving to New York City. "Lover, You Should've Come Over" is an acoustic ballad in which Buckley longs for his lover to forgive him.

== Release ==
"Grace" was released as a single in August 1994, followed by "Last Goodbye" on May 8, "So Real" and "Eternal Life". Buckley toured internationally for 18 months to promote Grace. According to the Mojo critic Jim Irvin, the performances "veered between delicate acoustic sets and full-scale sonic onslaughts", with Buckley "becoming increasingly interested in the harder end of the sound and the power of a band".

Grace sold 500,000 copies worldwide in its first year. It did not meet Columbia's sales expectations and did not achieve wide popularity in Buckley's lifetime. It received little radio airplay. It spent seven weeks on the US Billboard 200, reaching number 149. It was more successful in Australia, where it was released in early 1995 and reached number 9 on the ARIA charts. By the time of Buckley's death in 1997, Grace had sold 175,000 copies in the US.

== Critical reception ==
Professional ratings
Review scores
Source	Rating
AllMusic	5/5 stars
Chicago Tribune	3.5/4 stars
Entertainment Weekly	A+
The Guardian	5/5 stars
NME	9/10
Pitchfork	9.0/10
Q	4/5 stars
Rolling Stone	3/5 stars
Select	4/5
The Village Voice	C

Grace initially received mixed reviews. According to Pitchfork, its jazz and classical influences disappointed critics expecting "the next great alt-rock savior". In Rolling Stone, Stephanie Zacharek wrote that Buckley "sounds like a man who doesn't yet know what he wants to be", and that the "meticulous arrangements sound too orchestrated, too ornate". She felt his cover of "Hallelujah" was not "battered or desperate enough", but praised "Lilac Wine", writing: "His voice seems weighted down with tears that just won't come out the normal way." In The Village Voice, Robert Christgau panned the album, writing that Buckley was "beholden to Zeppelin and Nina Simone and Chris Whitley and the Cocteau Twins." He ultimately concluded, "Let us pray the force of hype blows him all the way to Uranus."

Dimitri Ehlrich of Entertainment Weekly wrote that Grace was "dreamy and stunningly original", describing Buckley's vocals as "an angel and devil wrapped in one". Another Entertainment Weekly writer, David Browne, named it the sixth-best album of the year. He felt that though Buckley encompassed "every cliché of the tortured bohemian artist", he was "aiming for a higher plane, musically and spiritually, than any other singer-songwriter right now, and he succeeds enough to matter". The Guardian critic Caroline Sullivan wrote that Grace was a "stunningly accomplished debut". In the Chicago Tribune, Greg Kot wrote that Buckley's voice had "a soulful intensity that sends chills", matched by the "rolling-and-tumbling dynamic" of the music. The Sydney Morning Herald said it was "a romantic masterpiece" and a "pivotal, defining work".

== Legacy ==
In February 1997, Buckley moved to Memphis, Tennessee, while working on his second album, My Sweetheart the Drunk. On May 29, he drowned while swimming in the Wolf River, a tributary of the Mississippi. Sales of Grace increased after his death, and it became popular among millennial and Generation Z listeners with the growth of the internet and social media in the 21st century. In The Guardian, Ben Beaumont-Thomas wrote that it became "a touchstone for college students and hopeless romantics".

In December 2008, Buckley's cover of "Hallelujah" reached number two on the UK singles chart, behind a version by Alexandra Burke. By 2011, Grace had achieved worldwide sales of two million. In February 2016, it was certified platinum in the US for sales of one million. In February 2026, "Lover, You Should've Come Over" reached number 84 on the Billboard Hot 100 after it became popular on the social media service TikTok. It was Buckley's first song to enter the Hot 100.

An expanded edition of Grace was released in 2004, with an additional CD of bonus tracks and a DVD making-of documentary. Reviewing the reissue, Pitchfork wrote that "Grace remains one of the most engaging, inspired records ever made, and its 10 original songs serve as the best possible portrait of Buckley as a diva, songwriter and artist".

Q readers voted Grace the 75th-greatest album of all time in 1998 and the 13th-greatest in 2005. The British critic Colin Larkin included it at number 99 in the third edition of his book All Time Top 1000 Albums (2000), writing that it "achieved a perfection that was staggering for a debut album". Rolling Stone ranked it number 303 on its 2003 list of the 500 greatest albums, number 304 in its 2009 list and 147 on its 2020 list. Rolling Stone included Buckley's cover of "Hallelujah" at number 259 on its 2003 list of the 500 greatest songs, and included "Grace" at number 394 on its updated 2021 list. On April 2, 2013, it was announced that Buckley's cover of "Hallelujah" would be inducted into the Library of Congress's National Recording Registry.

In 2006, Mojo named Grace the number-one "modern rock classic", and it was voted Australia's second-favorite album on the television special My Favourite Album. In 2011, VH1 named Grace the 73rd-greatest rock and roll album. In a worldwide poll of 40,000 people organized by British Hit Singles & Albums and NME in 2006, Grace was voted the 23rd-greatest album. In 2014, Guitar World placed Grace at number 26 in its list of "iconic albums that defined 1994".

The Led Zeppelin guitarist, Jimmy Page, said Grace was "close to being my favorite album of the decade". The singer, Robert Plant, was also complimentary. Bob Dylan named Buckley one of the decade's great songwriters, and David Bowie considered Grace the best album ever made. In 2010, the Smiths singer Morrissey, one of Buckley's influences, named Grace one of his favorite albums. The Muse singer and guitarist, Matt Bellamy, said Grace convinced him that his falsetto was suitable for rock music. In 2020, Bellamy purchased the Fender Telecaster Buckley used on Grace and used it in recordings with Muse and others.

=== Accolades ===
Publication	Country	Accolade	Year	Rank
Entertainment Weekly	United States	Best 10 Albums of the Year	1994	6
Eye Weekly	Canada	Best 30 Albums of the Year	1994	4
Juice	Australia	100 Greatest Albums of the 90s	1999	10
Les Inrockuptibles	France	Best 25 Albums of the Year	1994	14
Melody Maker	United Kingdom	Best 50 Albums of the Year	1994	9
Mojo	United Kingdom	Best 25 Albums of the Year	1994	1
NME	United Kingdom	Best 50 Albums of the Year	1994	21
The Wire	United Kingdom	50 Records of the Year (1994)	1995	32
Pitchfork	United States	Top 100 Albums of the 90s	2003	69
Platendraaier	The Netherlands	Top 30 Albums of the 90s	2015	7
Q	United Kingdom	Best Albums of the Year	1994	*
Q	United Kingdom	Reissues of the Year	2004	*
Rock Sound	United Kingdom	Best 50 Albums of the Year	1994	2
Rolling Stone	United States	The 500 Greatest Albums of All Time	2003	303
Rolling Stone	United States	The 500 Greatest Albums of All Time	2012	304
Rolling Stone	United States	The 500 Greatest Albums of All Time	2020	147
Rolling Stone	United States	The 500 Greatest Albums of All Time	2023	147
Rolling Stone	United States	The Essential Alternative Recordings of the 90s	—	*
Select	United Kingdom	Best 50 Albums of the Year	1994	41
Slant Magazine	United States	50 Essential Pop Albums	2003	*
Technikart	France	Best 5 Albums of the Year	1994	2
The Face	United Kingdom	Best 30 Albums of the Year	1994	18
The Guardian	United Kingdom	Alternative Top 100 Albums Ever	1999	15
The Guardian	United Kingdom	1000 Albums to Hear Before You Die	2007	*
1001 Albums You Must Hear Before You Die	United States	1001 Albums You Must Hear Before You Die	2010	*

* denotes an unranked list

== Track listing ==
Original track listing
No.	Title	Writer(s)	Length
1.	"Mojo Pin"	Jeff Buckley; Gary Lucas	5:42
2.	"Grace"	Buckley; Lucas	5:22
3.	"Last Goodbye"	Buckley	4:35
4.	"Lilac Wine"	James Shelton	4:32
5.	"So Real"	Buckley; Michael Tighe	4:43
6.	"Hallelujah"	Leonard Cohen	6:53
7.	"Lover, You Should've Come Over"	Buckley	6:43
8.	"Corpus Christi Carol"	Traditional, arranged by Benjamin Britten	2:56
9.	"Eternal Life"	Buckley	4:52
10.	"Dream Brother"	Buckley; Mick Grøndahl; Matt Johnson	5:26
Total length:			51:48

== Personnel ==
Credits adapted from Grace's liner notes.

Musicians

- Jeff Buckley – vocals, guitars, harmonium, organ, dulcimer, additional tabla on "Dream Brother"
- Mick Grøndahl – bass
- Matt Johnson – drums, percussion, vibraphone on "Dream Brother"
- Michael Tighe – guitar on "So Real"
- Gary Lucas – "Magicalguitarness" on "Mojo Pin" & "Grace"
- Loris Holland – organ on "Lover, You Should've Come Over"
- Misha Masud – tabla on "Dream Brother"
- Karl Berger – string arrangements

Production

- Andy Wallace – production, engineering, mixing
- Jeff Buckley – production on "So Real"
- Howie Weinberg – mastering
- Steve Berkowitz – executive producer
- Clif Norrell – engineering on "So Real", additional engineering "Corpus Christi Carol" & "Dream Brother"
- Chris Laidlaw – assistant engineer (Bearsville)
- Steve Sisco – assistant engineer (Quantum Sound)
- Bryant W. Jackson – assistant engineer (Soundtrack)
- Reggie Griffith – assistant engineer (Soundtrack)

Design

- Nicky Lindeman – art direction, design
- Christopher Austopchuk – art direction, design
- Jennifer Cohen – design assistant
- Merri Cyr – photography
- David Gahr – photography

== Charts ==
=== Weekly charts ===
Chart (1994–2026)	Peak position
Australian Albums (ARIA)	9
Belgian Albums (Ultratop Flanders)	25
Belgian Albums (Ultratop Wallonia)	132
Dutch Albums (Album Top 100)	84
French Albums (SNEP)	47
Greek Albums (IFPI)	3
Hungarian Physical Albums (MAHASZ)	35
Irish Albums (IRMA)	14
Italian Albums (FIMI)	40
Norwegian Albums (VG-lista)	38
Portuguese Albums (AFP)	15
Scottish Albums (Official Charts)	12
UK Albums (OCC)	31
US Billboard 200	82
US Catalog Albums (Billboard)	10

=== Year-end charts ===
Chart (1995)	Position
Australian Albums (ARIA)	94

Chart (2003)	Position
Belgian Albums (Ultratop Flanders)	93

Chart (2024)	Position
Australian Vinyl Albums (ARIA)	14
Belgian Albums (Ultratop Flanders)	188

Chart (2025)	Position
Australian Albums (ARIA)	84
Belgian Albums (Ultratop Flanders)	97
Icelandic Albums (Tónlistinn)	86

== Certifications ==
Region	Certification	Certified units/sales
Australia (ARIA)	8× Platinum	560,000^{‡}
Canada (Music Canada)	Gold	50,000^{‡}
Denmark (IFPI Danmark)	Platinum	20,000^{‡}
France (SNEP)	2× Gold	200,000^{*}
Italy (FIMI)	2× Platinum	100,000^{‡}
New Zealand (RMNZ)	Platinum	15,000^{‡}
Portugal (AFP)	Gold	3,500^{‡}
United Kingdom (BPI)	3× Platinum	900,000^{‡}
United States (RIAA)	Platinum	1,000,000^{‡}
Summaries
Europe (IFPI)	Platinum	1,000,000^{*}
^{*} Sales figures based on certification alone.^{‡} Sales+streaming figures based on certification alone.

== Release history ==
Region	Release date	Format	Label
United Kingdom; Europe	August 15, 1994	CD; LP	Columbia Records (Sony)
United States	August 23, 1994	CD	Columbia Records (Sony)
United States	August 23, 1994	Compact cassette	Columbia Records (Sony)
United States	August 23, 1994	Vinyl	Columbia Records (Sony)
United States	August 23, 1994	MiniDisc	Columbia Records (Sony)
United States	August 23, 1994	Promo cassette	Columbia Records (Sony)
Japan	September 1, 1994	CD	Columbia Records (Sony)
Australia	September 19, 1994	CD	Columbia Records (Sony)
Worldwide	August 23, 2004	Legacy Edition (2×CD+DVD)	Columbia Records (Sony)
