= Mojo Pin =

Song by Jeff Buckley

from the album Grace
- Released: August 23, 1994
- Recorded: 1993
- Studio: Bearsville Studios (Woodstock, New York)
- Genre: Alternative rock; hard rock
- Length: 5:42
- Label: Columbia
- Songwriters: Jeff Buckley; Gary Lucas
- Producer: Andy Wallace

"Mojo Pin" is a song by American musician Jeff Buckley. Featured on his only studio album Grace, it was written by Buckley and Gary Lucas, and was first introduced on his EP, Live at Sin-é before it was later used as the first track on Grace. Buckley stated that the song was about a dream of a Black woman. Through a wash of bizarre images, the lyrics convey a feeling of addiction, either to drugs or a person.

The song mixes a psychedelic feel, along with a more hard rock tone at intervals throughout the song. The original music for both "Grace" ("Rise Up to Be") and "Mojo Pin" ("And You Will") without Jeff's vocals can be found on Gary Lucas's CD, Level the Playing Field. The song is also featured on the Gary Lucas & Gods and Monster's CD, Coming Clean, with vocals by Michael Schoen.

Live versions of the song featured a long introduction entitled "Chocolate" in which Jeff imitated the vocal style of Nusrat Fateh Ali Khan.
