= Lover, You Should've Come Over =

1994 song by Jeff Buckley

Song by Jeff Buckley

from the album Grace
- Released: August 23, 1994
- Studio: Bearsville Studios (Woodstock, New York)
- Genre: Folk pop; soul
- Length: 6:43
- Label: Columbia
- Songwriter: Jeff Buckley
- Producer: Andy Wallace

Official audio
- "Lover, You Should've Come Over" on YouTube

"Lover, You Should've Come Over" is a song by the American singer-songwriter Jeff Buckley. It is the seventh track on his only studio album Grace, which was released on August 23, 1994, by Columbia Records.

== Music and lyrics ==
Musically, "Lover, You Should've Come Over" is a folk-pop and soul ballad. The song has a length of 6:43, and is composed in 6/8 time and the key of D major. It moves at a tempo of 120 beats per minute, and Buckley's vocal range spans more than two octaves, from B_{3} to D_{6}. The song begins with a harmonium passage. The song also includes organ performed by Loris Holland.

Inspired by the ending of the relationship between Buckley and Rebecca Moore, the lyrics concern the despondency of a young man growing older, finding that his actions represent a perspective he feels that he should have outgrown. Biographer and critic David Browne describes the lyrics as "confused and confusing" and the music as "a languid beauty".

== Release ==
On August 23, 2019–the 25th anniversary of the release of Grace–Columbia/Legacy Recordings published unreleased footage of Buckley performing the song on February 19, 1994, at Middle East in Cambridge, Massachusetts.

=== Cover versions ===
The song was covered by the English jazz pianist songwriter Jamie Cullum on his 2003 album Twentysomething. It has also been covered live by Australian singer-songwriter Matt Corby, English rock band Nothing But Thieves, and American singer-songwriter John Mayer, who named it the best song of all time in a 2003 interview with Rolling Stone's Austin Scaggs. The song was also featured in the third episode of the ABC series FlashForward titled "137 Sekunden". The song was covered by Natalie Maines on her 2013 solo album Mother, with NPR's Ann Powers calling it "the sort of careening soul-metal epic that few vocalists even dare to attempt". American singer Nikka Costa included a version of the song on her 2017 album Underneath and in Between. In 2021, Joey Landreth (of The Bros. Landreth) released his cover version.

== Reception ==
=== Legacy ===
In 2019, Paste's Steven Edelstone ranked "Lover, You Should've Come Over" as number one on his list of "The 10 Best Jeff Buckley Songs". Edelstone deemed the song "lyrical perfection" and its bridge an "all-timer": "It's never over, my kingdom for a kiss upon her shoulder / It's never over, all my riches for her smiles when I slept so soft against her / It's never over, all my blood for the sweetness of her laughter / It's never over, she's the tear that hangs inside my soul forever." Jacob Nierenberg of Consequence of Sound wrote that the song served as a "[reminder] that Buckley was making some of the most unique and unabashedly beautiful music of the 90s."

In the mid-2020s, the song experienced a surge in popularity through its use as background music in videos posted to the short-form video platform TikTok. In January 2024, it appeared on the TikTok Billboard Top 50, and reappeared there at number 19 in September 2024. In April 2025, it appeared on Billboard's Hot Rock & Alternative Songs chart for the first time, debuting at number 22. In late January 2026, it debuted at number 97 on the main Billboard Hot 100 chart, peaking at number 84 the following week.

== Charts ==
=== Weekly charts ===
Weekly chart performance for "Lover, You Should've Come Over"
Chart (2025–2026)	Peak position
Canada Hot 100 (Billboard)	80
Ireland (IRMA)	56
UK Singles (Official Charts)	61
US Billboard Hot 100	84
US Hot Rock & Alternative Songs (Billboard)	10

=== Year-end charts ===
Year-end chart performance for "Lover, You Should've Come Over"
Chart (2025)	Position
US Hot Rock & Alternative Songs (Billboard)	69

== Certifications ==
Certifications for "Lover, You Should've Come Over"
Region	Certification	Certified units/sales
New Zealand (RMNZ)	2× Platinum	60,000^{‡}
United Kingdom (BPI)	Platinum	600,000^{‡}
^{‡} Sales+streaming figures based on certification alone.
