= Jeff Buckley =

American musician (1966–1997)

- Buckley in 1994
- Born: Jeffrey Scott Buckley; November 17, 1966; Anaheim, California, U.S.
- Died: May 29, 1997 (aged 30); Memphis, Tennessee, U.S.
- Other name: Scott "Scottie" Moorhead
- Occupation: Singer-songwriter
- Years active: 1990–1997
- Relatives: Tim Buckley (father)
- Musical career
- Genres: Alternative rock; folk rock; blues
- Instruments: Vocals; guitar
- Label: Columbia
- Website: jeffbuckley.com
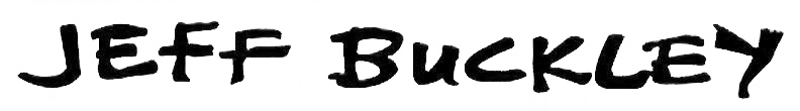

Jeffrey Scott Buckley (raised as Scott Moorhead; November 17, 1966 – May 29, 1997) was an American musician. After a decade as a session guitarist in Los Angeles, he attracted a following in the early 1990s performing at venues in the East Village, Manhattan. He signed with Columbia and released his only studio album, Grace, in 1994. Buckley toured extensively to promote Grace, with concerts in the U.S., Europe, Japan, and Australia.

In 1996, Buckley worked on his second album with the working title My Sweetheart the Drunk in New York City with Tom Verlaine as the producer. In February 1997, he resumed work after moving to Memphis, Tennessee. On May 29, while awaiting the arrival of his band from New York, Buckley drowned while swimming in the Wolf River, a tributary of the Mississippi. Posthumous releases include a collection of four-track demos and studio recordings for My Sweetheart the Drunk, and reissues of Grace and the Live at Sin-é EP.

After Buckley's death, his critical standing grew, and he has been cited as an influence by numerous musicians. Rolling Stone included Grace in three of its lists of the 500 greatest albums and named Buckley's version of the Leonard Cohen song "Hallelujah" one of the 500 greatest songs. In 2014, Buckley's version of "Hallelujah" was inducted into the American Library of Congress' National Recording Registry. In 2026, Buckley was nominated for the Rock and Roll Hall of Fame.

== Early life ==
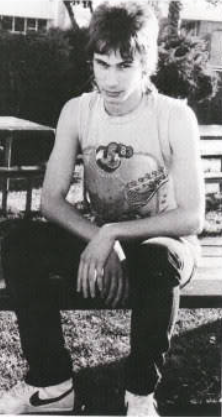
Buckley in his 1984 school yearbook

Born in Anaheim, California, Buckley was the only son of Mary (née Guibert) and the singer-songwriter Tim Buckley. His mother is a Zonian of Greek, English, French and Panamanian descent, while his father was the son of an Irish American father and an Italian American mother. Buckley was raised by his mother and stepfather, Ron Moorhead, in Southern California, and had a half-brother, Corey Moorhead. Buckley moved many times in and around Orange County while growing up, an upbringing he called "rootless trailer trash". As a child, Buckley was known as Scott "Scottie" Moorhead, based on his middle name and his stepfather's surname.

Buckley's biological father, Tim Buckley, released a series of folk and jazz albums in the late 1960s and early 1970s. Jeff said they met only once, when he was eight. After Tim died of a drug overdose in 1975, Jeff chose to go by Buckley and his given name, Jeff, which he found on his birth certificate. To members of his family he remained "Scottie".

Buckley was brought up around music; his mother was a classically trained pianist and cellist, and his stepfather introduced him to Led Zeppelin, Queen, Jimi Hendrix, the Who, and Pink Floyd at an early age. Led Zeppelin's Physical Graffiti was the first album he owned, and he said the hard rock band Kiss was an early favorite. He grew up singing around the house and in harmony with his mother, and said all his family sang. He began playing guitar at the age of five after discovering an acoustic guitar in his grandmother's closet. At age 12, he decided to become a musician and received his first electric guitar, a black Memphis Les Paul copy, at age 13. He attended Loara High School and played in the school jazz band; during this time, he developed an affinity for progressive rock bands Rush, Genesis, and Yes, and the jazz fusion guitarist Al Di Meola. He was a fan of Joni Mitchell, the Smiths and Siouxsie and the Banshees.

After graduating from high school, Buckley moved to Hollywood to attend the Musicians Institute, completing a one-year course at age 19. Buckley later said the school was "the biggest waste of time", but said in another interview that he had appreciated studying music theory: "I was attracted to really interesting harmonies, stuff that I would hear in Ravel, Ellington, Bartók."

== Career ==
In Los Angeles, Buckley spent six years working in a hotel and playing guitar in various bands, playing in styles from jazz, reggae, and roots rock to heavy metal. He toured with the dancehall reggae artist Shinehead and played occasional funk and R&B studio sessions, collaborating with the fledgling producer Michael J. Clouse to form X-Factor Productions. From 1988 to 1989, Buckley played in a band, the Wild Blue Yonder, that included John Humphrey and future Tool member Danny Carey. Buckley limited his singing to backing vocals.

Buckley moved to New York City in February 1990 but found few opportunities to work as a musician. He was introduced to Qawwali, the Sufi devotional music of Pakistan, and Nusrat Fateh Ali Khan, one of its best-known singers. Buckley was an impassioned fan of Khan, and during what he called his "café days", he often covered Khan's songs - he considered Khan his "Elvis". In January 1996, he interviewed Khan for Interview and wrote liner notes for Khan's Supreme Collection, Vol. 1 compilation. He also became interested in the blues musician Robert Johnson and the hardcore punk band Bad Brains during this time.

Buckley moved back to Los Angeles in September when his father's former manager, Herb Cohen, offered to help him record his first demo of original songs. Buckley completed Babylon Dungeon Sessions, a four-song cassette that included the songs "Eternal Life", "Last Goodbye", "Strawberry Street" and punk screamer "Radio". Cohen and Buckley hoped to attract industry attention with the demo tape.

Buckley flew back to New York City early in 1991 to make his public singing debut at a tribute concert for his father, Greetings from Tim Buckley. The event, produced by Hal Willner, was held at St. Ann's Church in Brooklyn on April 26, 1991. Accompanied by the experimental rock guitarist Gary Lucas, Buckley performed "I Never Asked To Be Your Mountain", a song Tim Buckley wrote about the infant Jeff and his mother. He returned to play "Sefronia – The King's Chain", "Phantasmagoria in Two", and concluded with "Once I Was" performed acoustically with an impromptu a cappella ending, due to a snapped guitar string. Willner, the show's organizer, recalled that Buckley made a strong impression.

Buckley's performance was counter to his desire to distance himself musically from his father; he later said: "It wasn't my work, it wasn't my life. But it bothered me that I hadn't been to his funeral, that I'd never been able to tell him anything. I used that show to pay my last respects." The concert was Buckley's first step into the music industry that had eluded him for years. Buckley rejected the suggestion he had performed at the concert to launch his career, instead citing personal reasons for performing.

On subsequent trips to New York in mid-1991, Buckley began co-writing with Gary Lucas, resulting in the songs "Grace" and "Mojo Pin". In late 1991, he began performing with Lucas's band Gods and Monsters in New York City. After being offered a development deal as a member of Gods and Monsters at Imago Records, Buckley moved to the Lower East Side, Manhattan, at the end of 1991. The day after Gods and Monsters officially debuted in March 1992, he decided to leave the band.

Buckley began performing at several clubs and cafés around Lower Manhattan, and Sin-é became his main venue. He first appeared at Sin-é in April 1992 and quickly earned a regular Monday night slot. His repertoire consisted of a diverse range of folk, rock, R&B, blues, and jazz cover songs, much of which he had newly learned. During this period, he discovered singers such as Nina Simone, Billie Holiday, Van Morrison, and Judy Garland. Buckley performed an eclectic selection of covers by artists including Led Zeppelin ("Night Flight"), Nusrat Fateh Ali Khan ("Ye Jo Halka Halka Suroor Hae"), Bob Dylan ("Mama, You've Been On My Mind"), Édith Piaf ("Je n'en connais pas la fin"), the Smiths ("I Know It's Over"), Bad Brains ("I Against I"), and Siouxsie Sioux ("Killing Time"). Original songs from the Babylon Dungeon Sessions and the songs he had written with Lucas were also included in his set lists. He performed solo, accompanying himself on a Fender Telecaster he borrowed from his friend Janine Nichols. Buckley said he learned how to perform onstage by playing to small audiences.

Over the next few months, Buckley attracted admiring crowds and attention from record label executives, including Clive Davis. By mid-1992, limos from executives eager to sign him lined the street outside Sin-é. Buckley signed with Columbia Records, home of Bob Dylan and Bruce Springsteen, for a three-album deal for nearly $1 million in October 1992. He spent three days in February 1993 in a studio with the engineer Steve Addabbo and the Columbia A&R representative Steve Berkowitz recording much of his solo repertoire. Buckley sang a cappella and accompanied himself on acoustic and electric guitars, Wurlitzer electric piano, and harmonium. The tapes were released on the posthumous compilation album You and I, and some of the material appeared on Buckley's debut album, Grace. Recording dates were set for July and August 1993 for what would become Buckley's recording debut, an EP of four songs, including a cover of Van Morrison's "The Way Young Lovers Do". The live EP Live at Sin-é was released on November 23, 1993.

=== Grace ===
In mid-1993, Buckley began working on his first album, Grace, with the producer Andy Wallace. Buckley assembled a band, composed of the bassist Mick Grøndahl and the drummer Matt Johnson, and spent several weeks rehearsing. In September, the trio headed to Bearsville Studios in Woodstock, New York, to spend six weeks recording basic tracks. Buckley invited ex-bandmate Lucas to play guitar on the songs "Grace" and "Mojo Pin", and the Woodstock-based jazz musician Karl Berger wrote and conducted string arrangements with Buckley assisting at times. Buckley returned home for overdubbing at studios in Manhattan and New Jersey, where he performed take after take to capture the perfect vocals and experimented with ideas for additional instruments and added textures to the songs.

In January 1994, Buckley departed on his first solo North American tour in support of Live at Sin-é, followed by a 10-day European tour in March. Buckley played clubs and coffeehouses and made in-store appearances. After returning, Buckley invited guitarist Michael Tighe to join the band and a collaboration between the two resulted in "So Real", a song recorded with producer/engineer Clif Norrell as a late addition to the album. In June, Buckley began his first full band tour, called the "Peyote Radio Theatre Tour", which lasted into August. The Pretenders' Chrissie Hynde, Soundgarden's Chris Cornell, and the Edge from U2 were among the attendees of these early shows.

Grace was released on August 23, 1994. In addition to seven original songs, the album included three covers: "Lilac Wine", based on the version by Nina Simone and made famous by Elkie Brooks; "Corpus Christi Carol", from Benjamin Britten's A Boy was Born, Op.3, a composition that Buckley was introduced to in high school, based on a 15th-century hymn; and "Hallelujah" by Leonard Cohen, based on John Cale's recording from the Cohen tribute album I'm Your Fan. His rendition of "Hallelujah" has been called "Buckley's best" and "one of the great songs" by Time, and is included on Happy Mag's list of "The 10 Best Covers Of All Time", and Rolling Stone's list of "The 500 Greatest Songs of All Time".

Sales of Grace were slow, and it garnered little radio airplay despite critical acclaim. The Sydney Morning Herald proclaimed it "a romantic masterpiece" and a "pivotal, defining work". Despite slow initial sales, the album went gold in France and Australia over the next two years, achieved gold status in the U.S. in 2002, and sold over six times platinum in Australia in 2006.

Grace won appreciation from a number of revered musicians and artists, including members of Buckley's biggest influence, Led Zeppelin. Jimmy Page considered Grace close to being his "favorite album of the decade". Robert Plant was also complimentary, as was Brad Pitt, saying of Buckley's work, "There's an undercurrent to his music, there's something you can't pinpoint. Like the best of films, or the best of art, there's something going on underneath, and there's a truth there. And I find his stuff absolutely haunting. It just ... it's under my skin." Others who had influenced Buckley's music lauded him: Bob Dylan named Buckley "one of the great songwriters of this decade", and, in an interview with The Village Voice, David Bowie named Grace one of 10 albums he would bring with him to a desert island. In 2010, the Smiths singer Morrissey, one of Buckley's influences, named Grace one of his favorite albums.

=== Concert tours ===
Buckley spent much of the next year and a half touring internationally to promote Grace. Following Buckley's Peyote Radio Theater tour, the band began a European tour on August 23, 1994, starting with performances in the UK and Ireland. The tour continued in Scandinavia and, throughout September, numerous concerts in Germany were played. The tour ended on September 22 with a concert in Paris. A gig on September 24 in New York dovetailed with the end of the European tour and Buckley and band spent the next month relaxing and rehearsing.

A tour of Canada and the U.S. began on October 19, 1994, at CBGB, New York City. The tour was far reaching with concerts held on both East and West Coasts of the U.S. and a number of performances in central and southern states. The tour ended two months later on December 18 at Maxwell's in Hoboken, New Jersey. After another month of rest and rehearsal, the band commenced a second European tour, this time mainly for promotion purposes. The band began the tour in Dublin. The short tour largely consisted of promotional work in London and Paris.

In late January, the band did their first tour of Japan, playing concerts and appearing for promotion of the album and newly released Japanese single "Last Goodbye". The band returned to Europe on February 6. He toured various Western European countries before returning to the U.S. on March 6. Among the gigs performed during this period, Buckley and his band performed at a 19th-century-built French venue, the Bataclan, and material from the concert was recorded and later released in October of that year as a four track EP, Live from the Bataclan. Songs from a performance on February 25, at the venue Nighttown in Rotterdam, were released as a promotional-only CD, So Real.

Touring recommenced in April with dates across the U.S. and Canada. During this period, Buckley and the band played Metro in Chicago, which was recorded on video and later released as Live in Chicago on VHS and later on DVD. In addition, on June 4 they played at Sony Music Studios for the Sony Music radio hour. Following this was a month-long European tour between June 20 and July 18 in which they played many summer music festivals, including the Glastonbury Festival and the 1995 Meltdown Festival (at which Buckley sang Henry Purcell's "Dido's Lament" at the invitation of Elvis Costello). During the tour, Buckley played two concerts at the Paris Olympia, a venue made famous by the French vocalist Édith Piaf. Although he had failed to fill out smaller American venues at that point of his career, both nights at the large Paris Olympia venue were sold out. Shortly after this Buckley attended the Festival de la Musique Sacrée (Festival of Sacred Music), also held in France, and performed "What Will You Say" as a duet with Alim Qasimov, an Azerbaijani mugham singer. Sony BMG has since released a live album, 2001's Live à L'Olympia, which has a selection of songs from both Olympia performances and the collaboration with Qasimov.

Buckley's Mystery White Boy tour, playing concerts in both Sydney and Melbourne, Australia, lasted between August 28 and September 6 and recordings of these performances were compiled and released on the live album Mystery White Boy. Buckley was so well received during these concerts that his album Grace went gold in Australia, selling over 35,000 copies, and taking this into account he decided a longer tour was needed and returned for a tour of New Zealand and Australia in February the following year.

Between the two Oceanian tours, Buckley and the band took a break from touring. Buckley played solo in the meantime with concerts at Sin-é and a New Year's Eve concert at Mercury Lounge in New York. After the break, the band spent the majority of February on the Hard Luck Tour in Australia and New Zealand, but tensions had risen between the group and drummer Matt Johnson. The concert on March 1, 1996, was the last gig he played with Buckley and his band.

Much of the material from the tours of 1995 and 1996 was recorded and released on either promotional EPs, such as the Grace EP, or posthumously on albums, such as Mystery White Boy (a reference to Buckley not using his real name) and Live à L'Olympia. Many of the other concerts Buckley played during this period have surfaced on bootleg recordings.

Following Johnson's departure, the band, now without a drummer, was put on hold and did not perform live again until February 12, 1997. Due to the pressure from extensive touring, Buckley spent the majority of the year away from the stage. However, from May 2 to 5, he played a short stint as bass guitarist with Mind Science of the Mind, with friend Nathan Larson, then guitarist of Shudder to Think. Buckley returned to playing live concerts when he went on his "phantom solo tour" of cafés in the northeast U.S. in December 1996, appearing under a series of aliases: the Crackrobats, Possessed by Elves, Father Demo, Smackrobiotic, the Halfspeeds, Crit-Club, Topless America, Martha & the Nicotines, and A Puppet Show Named Julio. By way of justification, Buckley posted a note stating he missed the anonymity of playing in cafés and local bars:

There was a time in my life not too long ago when I could show up in a café and simply do what I do, make music, learn from performing my music, explore what it means to me, i.e., have fun while I irritate and/or entertain an audience who don't know me or what I am about. In this situation I have that precious and irreplaceable luxury of failure, of risk, of surrender. I worked very hard to get this kind of thing together, this work forum. I loved it and then I missed it when it disappeared. All I am doing is reclaiming it.

=== My Sweetheart the Drunk ===
In 1996, Buckley started writing a new album with the working title My Sweetheart the Drunk. While working with Patti Smith on her 1996 album Gone Again, he met Tom Verlaine, lead singer of the punk-new wave band Television. Buckley asked Verlaine to be producer on the new album and he agreed. In mid-1996, Buckley and his band began recording sessions in Manhattan with Verlaine, recording "Sky Is a Landfill", "Vancouver", "Morning Theft", and "You and I". Eric Eidel played the drums through these sessions as a stop-gap after Matt Johnson's departure, before Parker Kindred joined as full-time drummer. Around this time, Buckley met Inger Lorre of the Nymphs in an East Village bar and struck up a fast and close friendship. Together, they contributed a track to Kerouac: Kicks Joy Darkness, a Jack Kerouac tribute album. After Lorre's backup guitarist for an upcoming album quit the project, Buckley offered to fill in. He became attached to one of the songs from the album, "Yard of Blonde Girls" and recorded a cover. Another recording session in Manhattan followed in early 1997, but Buckley and the band were unsatisfied with the material.

On February 4, 1997, Buckley played a short set at the Knitting Factory's tenth anniversary concert featuring a selection of his new songs: "Jewel Box", "Morning Theft", "Everybody Here Wants You", "The Sky is a Landfill" and "Yard of Blonde Girls". Lou Reed was in attendance and expressed interest in working with Buckley. The band played their first gig with Parker Kindred, their new drummer, at Arlene's Grocery in New York on February 9. The set featured much of Buckley's new material that would appear on Sketches for My Sweetheart the Drunk and a recording has become one of Buckley's most widely distributed bootlegs. Later that month, Buckley recorded a spoken word reading of the Edgar Allan Poe poem "Ulalume" for the album Closed on Account of Rabies. It was his last recording in New York; shortly after, he moved to Memphis, Tennessee.

Buckley became interested in recording at Easley McCain Recording in Memphis, at the suggestion of friend Dave Shouse from the Grifters. He rented a shotgun house there, of which he was so fond he contacted the owner about purchasing it. From February 12 to May 26, 1997, Buckley played at Barristers', a bar located in downtown Memphis, underneath a parking garage. He played there numerous times in order to work through the new material in a live atmosphere, at first with the band, then solo as part of a Monday night residency. In early February, Buckley and the band did a third recording session with Verlaine in Memphis, where they recorded "Everybody Here Wants You", "Nightmares by the Sea", "Witches' Rave" and "Opened Once", but Buckley expressed his dissatisfaction with the sessions and contacted Grace producer Andy Wallace to step in as Verlaine's replacement. Buckley started recording demos on his own 4-track recorder in preparation for a forthcoming session with Wallace; some of the demos were sent to his band in New York, who listened to them enthusiastically and were excited to resume work on the album. However, Buckley was not entirely happy with the results and sent his band back to New York while he stayed behind to work on the songs. The band was scheduled to return to Memphis for rehearsals and recording on May 29. After Buckley's death, the Verlaine-produced recordings and Buckley's demos were released as Sketches for My Sweetheart the Drunk in May 1998.

== Musical style ==
Buckley possessed a tenor vocal range. He cited singers including Joni Mitchell, Nina Simone, Billie Holiday, Patti Smith and Siouxsie Sioux as influences. He said: "Siouxsie, I have much of her influence in my voice". Buckley made full use of this range in his performances, particularly in the songs from Grace, and reached peaks of high G in the tenor range at the culmination of "Grace". "Corpus Christi Carol" was sung nearly entirely in a high falsetto. The pitch and volume of his singing was also highly variable, showcased in songs "Mojo Pin" and "Dream Brother", which began with mid-range quieter vocals, before reaching louder, higher peaks near the ending of the songs.

Buckley played guitar in a variety of styles, ranging from the distorted rock of "Sky Is a Landfill", the jazz of "Strange Fruit", the country styling of "Lost Highway", and the guitar fingerpicking style in "Hallelujah". He occasionally used a slide guitar in live performances as a solo act, as well as for the introduction of "Last Goodbye", when playing with a full band. His songs were written in various guitar tunings which, apart from the EADGBE standard tuning, included drop D tuning and an open G tuning. His guitar playing style varied from highly melodic songs, such as "The Twelfth of Never", to more percussive ones, such as "New Year's Prayer".

=== Equipment ===
Buckley mainly played a blonde 1983 Fender Telecaster, which he had re-fretted and modded with a Seymour Duncan Hot Lead Stack in the bridge and a mirror pick guard. In 2020, the Muse guitarist Matt Bellamy purchased Buckley's Telecaster. According to Bellamy, its pickups are out of phase, creating a "super-glassy" tone and clarity audible on Grace.

Buckley also played guitars including a Rickenbacker 360/12, a black Gibson Les Paul Custom and a 1967 Guild F-50 acoustic. When on tour with his band, he used Fender amplifiers for a clean sound and Mesa Boogie amps for overdriven tones. While he was primarily a singer and guitarist, he also played other instruments on various studio recordings and sessions, including bass, dobro, mandolin, harmonium (heard on the intro to "Lover, You Should've Come Over"), organ, dulcimer ("Dream Brother" intro), tabla, esraj, and harmonica.

== Personal life ==
Buckley was roommates with actress Brooke Smith from 1990 to 1991. During a tribute concert to his father, Tim Buckley, in April 1991, Buckley met artist Rebecca Moore, and the pair dated until 1993. This relationship became the inspiration for his record Grace and provoked his permanent move to New York. From 1994 to 1995, Buckley had an intense relationship with Elizabeth Fraser of Cocteau Twins. They wrote and recorded a duet together, "All Flowers in Time Bend Towards the Sun", which has never been released commercially. In 1994, Buckley began a relationship with musician Joan Wasser, known professionally as Joan as Police Woman. He reportedly proposed marriage to her shortly before his death.

== Death ==
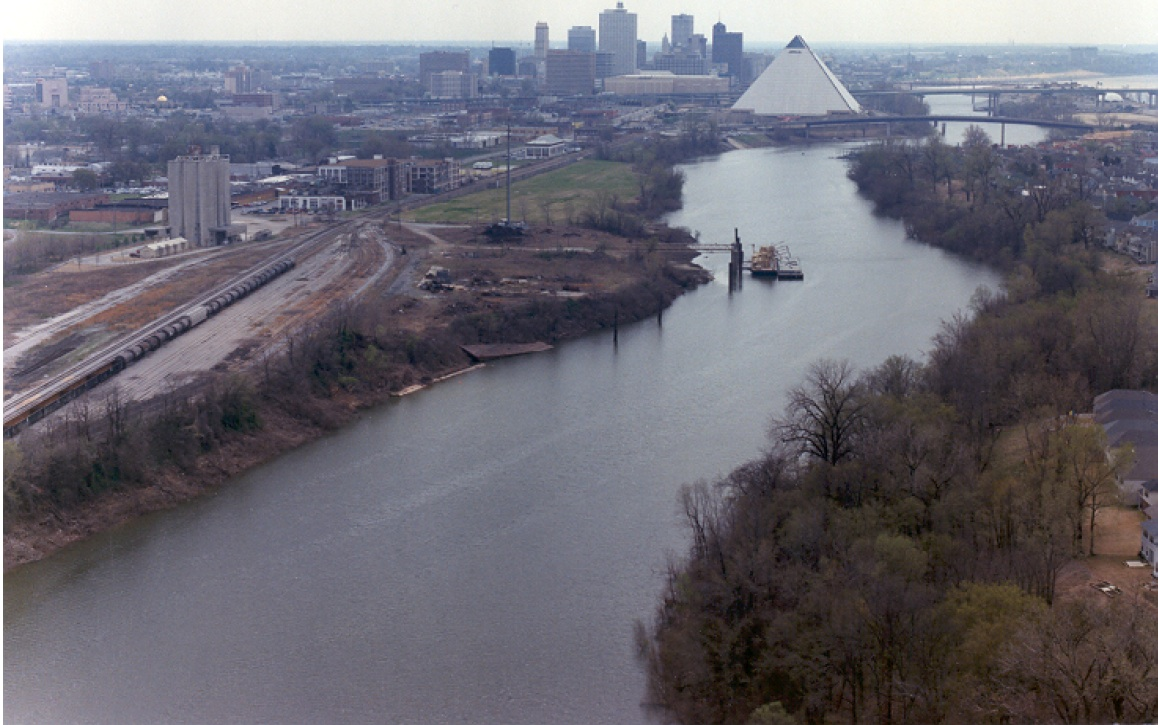
Wolf River Harbor, with Memphis, Tennessee, in background

On the evening of May 29, 1997, Buckley's band flew to Memphis to join him in his studio to work on his new material. Later that evening, Buckley spontaneously went swimming fully dressed in the Wolf River Harbor, a slack water channel of the Mississippi River, singing the chorus of Led Zeppelin's "Whole Lotta Love" under the Memphis Suspension Railway.

Keith Foti, a roadie in Buckley's band, remained on shore. After moving a radio and guitar out of reach from the wake from a passing tugboat, Foti looked up to see Buckley had vanished; the wake of the tugboat had swept him away from shore and under water. A rescue effort that night and the next morning by scuba teams and police was unsuccessful. On June 4, passengers on the American Queen riverboat spotted Buckley's body in the Wolf River, caught in branches.

Buckley's autopsy showed no signs of drugs or alcohol, and the death was ruled an accidental drowning. His official website published a statement saying his death was neither mysterious nor a suicide.

== Legacy ==
After Buckley's death, a collection of demo recordings and a full-length album he had been reworking for his second album were released as a compilation album, Sketches for My Sweetheart the Drunk. It was overseen by his mother, Mary Guibert, band members and his friend Michael J. Clouse, as well as Chris Cornell. It was certified gold in Australia in 1998. Three other albums composed of live recordings have also been released, along with a live DVD of a performance in Chicago. A previously unreleased 1992 recording of "I Shall Be Released", sung by Buckley over the phone on live radio, was released on the album For New Orleans.

An hour-long documentary, Amazing Grace: Jeff Buckley, was shown at film festivals to acclaim. It was released worldwide in 2009 by Sony BMG Legacy as part of the Grace Around The World Deluxe Edition. In early 2009, it was revealed that Ryan Jaffe, best known for scripting the movie The Rocker, had replaced Brian Jun as screenwriter for the upcoming film Mystery White Boy. Orion Williams is also set to co-produce the film with Michelle Sy. A separate project involving the book Dream Brother was allegedly cancelled.

In May and June 2007, Buckley's life and music were celebrated with tributes in Australia, Canada, UK, France, Iceland, Israel, Ireland, Macedonia, Portugal, and the U.S. Many of Buckley's family members attended various tribute concerts across the globe, some of which they helped organize. There are three annual Jeff Buckley tribute events: the Chicago-based Uncommon Ground, featuring a three-day concert schedule (Uncommon Ground hosted their 25th anniversary tribute in November 2022); An Evening with Jeff Buckley, an annual New York City tribute; and the Australia-based Fall In Light. The latter event is run by the Fall In Light Foundation, which in addition to the concerts, runs a "Guitars for Schools" program.

On April 2, 2013, it was announced that Buckley's version of "Hallelujah" would be inducted into the Library of Congress's National Recording Registry. In 2015, tapes of a 1993 recording session for Columbia Records were discovered by Sony executives doing research for the 20th anniversary of Grace. The recordings were released on the album You and I in March 2016, featuring mostly covers of songs.

In 2012, Greetings from Tim Buckley premiered at the Toronto International Film Festival. The film explores Jeff Buckley's relationship with his father. At a tribute concert for the deceased Foo Fighters drummer Taylor Hawkins in 2022, Foo Fighters singer, Dave Grohl, and his daughter, Violet, performed "Last Goodbye" and "Grace", with Alain Johannes, Greg Kurstin, Chris Chaney, and Jason Falkner. In 2026, Buckley was nominated for the Rock and Roll Hall of Fame.

=== Resurgence ===
On March 7, 2008, Buckley's version of "Hallelujah" reached number one on the iTunes chart, selling 178,000 downloads for the week, after being performed by Jason Castro on the seventh season of American Idol. The song also debuted at number one on Billboard's Hot Digital Songs chart, giving Buckley his first number one hit on any Billboard chart.

The 2008 UK X Factor winner Alexandra Burke released a cover of "Hallelujah", with the intent to top the UK Singles Chart as the Christmas number one single. Buckley fans countered this, launching a campaign with the aim of propelling Buckley's version to the number one spot; despite this, Burke's version eventually reached the Christmas number one position on the UK charts in December 2008. Buckley's version of the song entered the UK charts at number 49 on November 30, and by December 21, it had reached number 2, even though it had not been rereleased in a physical format.

In February 2026, "Lover, You Should've Come Over" reached number 84 on the Billboard Hot 100 after it became popular on the social media service TikTok. It was Buckley's first song to enter the Hot 100. In The Guardian, Ben Beaumont-Thomas wrote that a new generation had discovered Buckley’s "spirited, romantic songwriting".

=== Influence ===
Radiohead recorded their 1995 song "Fake Plastic Trees" after being inspired by Buckley's performance at the Garage, London. The bassist, Colin Greenwood, said, "He just had a Telecaster and a pint of Guinness. And it was just fucking amazing, really inspirational." The singer, Thom Yorke, said Buckley gave him the confidence to sing in falsetto. The Muse singer and guitarist, Matt Bellamy, said he did not believe his singing would be suitable for rock music until he heard Grace, which made him confident that "a high-pitched, softer voice can work very well". The Coldplay singer, Chris Martin, described the 2000 Coldplay single "Shiver" as a Buckley "ripoff". Other musicians influenced by Buckley include Adele, Bat for Lashes, Lana Del Rey, Anna Calvi, Kiesza, Ben Folds, Jonny Lang, Eddie Vedder, Fran Healy, Chris Cornell, Sombr, and Nelly Furtado.

=== Biographical films ===
According to Variety, a biographical film, Everybody Here Wants You, starring Reeve Carney as Buckley, was set to begin filming in late 2021. It was to be Orian Williams's directorial debut and released by Culmination Productions. It was to be co-produced by Buckley's mother, Mary Guibert, and access to his music was approved by Alison Raykovich, manager of Buckley's estate. Buckley's mother said "this will be the only official dramatisation of Jeff's story".

It's Never Over, Jeff Buckley is a 2025 American documentary film, directed and produced by Amy Berg. It had its world premiere at the Sundance Film Festival on January 24, 2025, and was released on August 8, 2025, by Magnolia Pictures. HBO added it on their roster in December.

== Awards and nominations ==
- The Académie Charles Cros awarded Buckley the "Grand Prix International Du Disque" on April 13, 1995, in honor of his debut album Grace.
- MTV Video Music Award nomination for Best New Artist in a Video for "Last Goodbye", 1995
- Rolling Stone magazine nomination for Best New Artist, 1995
- Triple J Hottest 100 awarded number 14 best song for that year in the world's largest voting competition for "Last Goodbye", 1995
- Grammy Award nomination for Best Male Rock Vocal Performance for "Everybody Here Wants You", 1998
- Grace was ranked number 303 of the 500 Greatest Albums by Rolling Stone in 2003.
- Buckley's cover of "Hallelujah" was ranked number 259 of the 500 Greatest Songs by Rolling Stone in 2004.
- MOJO Awards nomination for Catalogue Release of the Year for Grace, 2005
- In 2006, Mojo named Grace the number one Modern Rock Classic of all Time. It was also rated as Australia's second favorite album on My Favourite Album, a television special aired by the Australian Broadcasting Corporation, on December 3, 2006.
- Rolling Stone ranked Buckley number 39 in its 2008 list, The 100 Greatest Singers of All Time.
- On the Triple J Hottest 100 of All Time, 2009, Buckley's version of "Hallelujah" was voted third place; "Last Goodbye" was seventh, "Lover, You Should've Come Over" was 56th, and "Grace" 69th.

== Discography ==
- Grace (1994)

== See also ==
- List of solved missing person cases: 1990s
