= Mick Grøndahl =

Danish-American bass guitarist

Mick Grondahl
- Born: Michael Grøndahl; Copenhagen, Denmark
- Origin: New York, U.S.
- Genres: Alternative rock; folk-rock; blues
- Occupations: Musician; singer; songwriter
- Instruments: Vocals; bass guitar
- Works: Jeff Buckley discography
- Years active: 1993-present
- Label: Columbia

Michael Christian Grøndahl (often spelled Grondahl) is an Danish-American bass guitarist. He played bass guitar in Jeff Buckley's band.

== Early life ==
Grøndahl was born in Copenhagen, Denmark. At a young age, Grøndahl moved to and was raised in Manhattan, New York with his mother and grandmother, Vava. Grøndahl attended Skidmore College where he graduated with a bachelor's degree in Art History and English. He then moved to New York City where he played with several bands. He met Jeff Buckley after seeing him perform at Columbia University's Postcrypt Cafe.

== Career ==
Grøndahl began playing in local bands, playing the local bar scene on Saratoga's Broadway strip. Grøndahl was asked to play in bass Jeff Buckley's band in 1993. Before and after Buckley's death, he played in several bands including Elysian Fields, Beth Orton and the Greenlandic singer Angu. Grøndahl also briefly worked with American songwriter Elliott Smith during recording for Smith’s album XO, however did not contribute studio work. As of 2020 he is living in Denmark with his daughter, recording and performing with his group.

== Musicianship and equipment ==
Grøndahl also toured with a black Jazz Bass as a backup on the Mystery White Boy tour. Grøndahl played through a Mesa/Boogie 400+ bass amp paired with a Mesa/Boogie RoadReady powerhouse cabinet.

== Discography ==
=== With Jeff Buckley ===
- Grace (1994)
- Sketches for My Sweetheart the Drunk (1998)
- Fall in Light (1999)
- Mystery White Boy (2000)
- Live in Chicago (2000)

=== As Mick Grondahl ===
- Memphis Twilight (2023)
