= Last Goodbye (Jeff Buckley song) =

1995 single by Jeff Buckley

Single by Jeff Buckley

from the album Grace
- Released: May 8, 1995
- Recorded: Late 1993
- Studio: Bearsville Studios (Woodstock, New York)
- Genre: Alternative rock; folk rock
- Length: 4:35
- Label: Columbia
- Songwriter: Jeff Buckley
- Producer: Andy Wallace

Jeff Buckley singles chronology
"Grace" (1994)	"Last Goodbye" (1995)	"So Real" (1995)

Official video
- "Last Goodbye" on YouTube

"Last Goodbye" is a song by American singer-songwriter Jeff Buckley, from his 1994 studio album Grace. It was the second single released from the album, after the title song. It was Buckley's most commercially successful song in the US during his lifetime, earning him a belated alternative hit in early 1995, peaking at No. 19 on the U.S. Billboard Modern Rock Tracks chart. In Australia, the single peaked at No. 88 on the ARIA Singles Chart.

"Last Goodbye" was originally titled "Unforgiven", and had a more straightforward rock feel and instrumentation; it was first recorded at a demo session in 1990. A live version of the song, still titled "Unforgiven", was recorded in 1993 and released on the posthumous 2003 album Live at Sin-é (Legacy Edition).

== Music video ==
A music video was created for "Last Goodbye", which showed Buckley and the rest of the band playing the song on a stage while video was projected onto them and the wall behind them.

== Track listing ==
UK CD 1 (6620422)

1. "Last Goodbye (Edit)"
2. "Last Goodbye (Full Version)"
3. "Last Goodbye (Live and Acoustic in Japan)"

UK CD 2 (6620425)

1. "Last Goodbye (Full Version)"
2. "Dream Brother (Live in Hamburg)"
3. "So Real (Live and Acoustic in Japan)"

Japanese EP (SRCS-7592)

1. "Last Goodbye (Edit)"
2. "Mojo Pin (Live at Wetlands)"
3. "Kanga-Roo"
4. "Lost Highway"

== Soundtrack appearances and covers ==
The song is included in the soundtrack of the 2001 film Vanilla Sky. The song is also present in episode 7 of season 4 of Sex Education.

A cover of the song by actress Scarlett Johansson, done with only voice and piano, appeared on the soundtrack of the 2009 film He's Just Not That Into You.

The song was sung by Andy Mientus in the 2013 episode "The Producers" of the television show Smash.

== Other appearances ==
On January 12, 2005, the famed Washington, D.C./Baltimore, MD alternative radio station WHFS played "Last Goodbye" as their final track before going under new management as a modern Latin music station. It has also been used by other alternative stations as their last song, including WRXP in New York City (before switching to a simulcast of WFAN), WBRU in Providence, and KRBZ in Kansas City.

The song appeared on an episode of Hindsight.

== Charts ==
Chart (1994)	Peak position
Australia (ARIA)	88
UK Singles (Official Charts)	54
US Alternative Airplay (Billboard)	19

== Certifications ==
Region	Certification	Certified units/sales
New Zealand (RMNZ)	Gold	15,000^{‡}
United Kingdom (BPI)	Silver	200,000^{‡}
^{‡} Sales+streaming figures based on certification alone.
