= So Real (Jeff Buckley song) =

Single by Jeff Buckley

from the album Grace
- Released: June 1995 (Aus)
- Recorded: 1993
- Studio: Bearsville Studios (Woodstock, New York)
- Genre: Alternative rock; psychedelic rock; post-rock
- Length: 4:43
- Label: Columbia
- Songwriters: Michael Tighe; Jeff Buckley
- Producers: Jeff Buckley; Andy Wallace

Jeff Buckley singles chronology
"Last Goodbye" (1994)	"So Real" (1995)	"Eternal Life" (1995)

Official video
- "So Real" on YouTube

"So Real" is the third single from Jeff Buckley's 1994 album Grace, and also had an accompanying video. A commercial CD-single was only released in Australia.

== Background ==
Michael Tighe, a guitarist who joined Buckley late in the recording of Grace, brought with him what was to become the main riff on "So Real" that is played during the verses.

"Forget Her" was originally on the album track list, but Buckley subsequently replaced it with "So Real". The former, while not appearing on the album, was subsequently released on the second disc of the 10th anniversary Legacy Edition of Grace and is also on the official Jeff Buckley site, with a recent video made of existing footage of Buckley while alive. This video is also found on the DVD that comes with the aforementioned Legacy Edition.

"I love "So Real" because it's the actual quartet that you see in that picture right there that you have on the wall, on the album. And that one I produced live all one moment, the vocal is the first take, all one take. It was three o'clock in the morning."

== Music video ==
A music video for "So Real" was directed by English filmmaker Sophie Muller, and filmed in New York City. The video depicts Jeff Buckley riding a bicycle through the streets of New York City to a diner. After finding a seat at the diner and interacting with other customers, he notices his bicycle being stolen by a group of gorillas. Pursuing the gorillas, Buckley begins to undress himself while in the evening sunlight. Alongside the video's main narrative, surreal footage of Buckley and his band performing the song is featured throughout.

During the winter of 1994, Muller met with Buckley to discuss ideas for the video. Muller would later describe the video's production as "weird and dreamy and nightmarish". The night before filming, the budget was cut in half. The video received little play on television following its release. In 1997, It was screened at Buckley's funeral.
