= Matt Johnson (drummer) =

American drummer (born 1970)

Matt Johnson (born 6 November 1970 in Houston, Texas) is an American drummer who played in the band of Jeff Buckley, appearing and co-writing one song on his album Grace in 1994, as well as on subsequent live releases and EPs. Although he stopped playing with Buckley before recording began on what was to become the singer's final original album (released posthumously as Sketches for My Sweetheart the Drunk), Johnson shares writing credits for one of its tracks.

Matt Johnson has also performed and recorded with Duncan Sheik, Elysian Fields, Rufus Wainwright, Martha Wainwright, Gabriel Kahane, Dean Wareham, Britta Phillips, Beth Orton, David Poe, Theo Eastwind and Jade Bird. Johnson toured with American indie musician St. Vincent from 2011 to 2019.

Johnson has released two solo albums: Cagefighter and Law of the Land.

He has also played with the Australian singer-songwriter duo Angus & Julia Stone and with singer/producer Eric J Dubowsky (also known as Eric J) in the NYC band Essex.
