= Songs to No One 1991–1992 =

Songs To No One 1991–1992

Compilation album by Jeff Buckley and Gary Lucas
- Released: October 15, 2002
- Recorded: August 17, 1991 – April 23, 1992; New York City
- Genre: Alternative
- Length: 60:45
- Labels: Circus Records; Knitting Factory Records
- Producers: Jeff Buckley; Gary Lucas; Nicholas Hill
- Compiler: Hal Willner

Jeff Buckley chronology
| Live À L'Olympia (2001) | Songs To No One 1991–1992 (2002) | The Grace EPs (2002) |

Professional ratings
Review scores
| Source | Rating |
|---|---|
| Allmusic | 1.5/5 stars |
| Pitchfork | 7.8/10 |
| Rolling Stone | 3/5 stars |

Songs to No One 1991–1992 is an album of material from studio sessions, home tapes, and club performances recorded during the collaboration between Jeff Buckley and Gary Lucas.

The album is the result of an eight-month musical partnership between the duo, beginning in August 1991 and ending in April 1992. It serves as a musical archive of both artists’ aesthetic developments, before Buckley's solo career began after his 1994 debut release, Grace.

== Background ==
=== Gods and Monsters ===
Originating in New York City after leaving Captain Beefheart, the first instalment of Lucas's first self-directed band arose with a performance debut at the Welcome Back to Brooklyn Festival in Prospect Park, June, 1989.

Named after Lucas's favourite quote from the 1935 horror film Bride of Frankenstein, "To a new world of gods and monsters!", the then all instrumental congregation of musicians developed into a psychedelic, avant-garde rock band, Gods and Monsters.

After the inclusion of the group's first vocalist, Julia Heyward, the band expanded to 7-piece art-pop group, taking to the gigging scene of underground New York before being signed to Columbia Records in October 1989.

However, this instalment of the Gods and Monsters ensemble proved to be problematic. Whilst having a female lead vocalist made for a tactical development in a commercial sense, the pair had mismatched intentions for what the band could be. Lucas referred to Heyward as a "constant adversarial headache", whose musical agenda was one of politics rather than poetry.

These differing artistic directions lead Lucas and Heyward into conflict early on in their collaboration, resulting in having zero tracks committed to tape in over a year signed with Columbia . Reflecting on this partnership, Lucas stated in his book Touched by Grace that he "was pretty fed up with my musical partner and secretly dreamed of finding a male vocalist… a beautiful boy who could flat-out rock and not write peachy didactic lyrics".

It was at this point, early spring of 1991, that New York producer Hal Willner contacted Lucas to invite the pair to perform at a Tim Buckley tribute concert, which took place later that year. Willner pushed Lucas to work on a rendition of 'Sefronia — The King's Chain', a piece that would later see Lucas work with Jeff Buckley for the first time.

=== Greetings from Tim Buckley ===
Greetings From Tim Buckley was a tribute concert for the cult followers of folk come experimental jazz and blues practitioner, Tim Buckley, who died of a drug overdose in 1975.

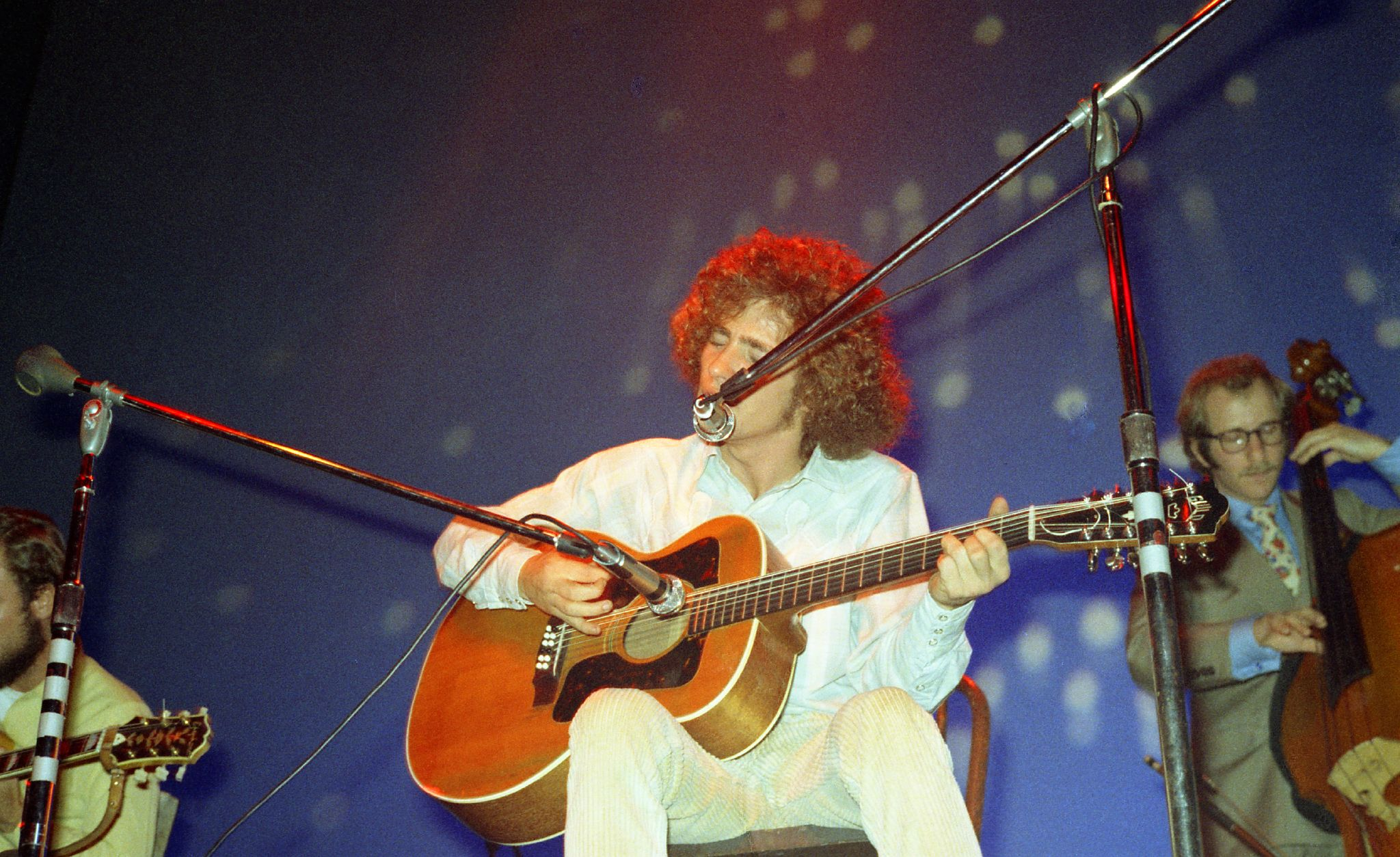
Tim Buckley performing on October 19, 1968

The tribute came about initially as a failed LP project paired with an hour screening on the network television show, 'Night Music'. The idea envisaged initially by Willner was adopted by St Ann's artistic director, Janine Nichols.

On the possibility of Greetings From Tim Buckley as part of Arts at St Ann's, Willner stated: "For some reason… I thought that Buckley’s music, in this type of multi-artist situation, would work better live than on LP. I agreed to it thinking it would never happen. It happened".

St Ann's, a church in Brooklyn, has been home to an array of concerts existing under the 'Arts at St Ann's' committee, founded by Susan Feldman in 1979. Paired with Nichols on producing the 1991 season talent, the adoption of Willner's idea quickly became an exciting event to direct. The three organisers already fans of Tim Buckley's musical legacy, set to work on saluting the 1960s folk musician by firstly tracking down a publicity photo for the concert program.

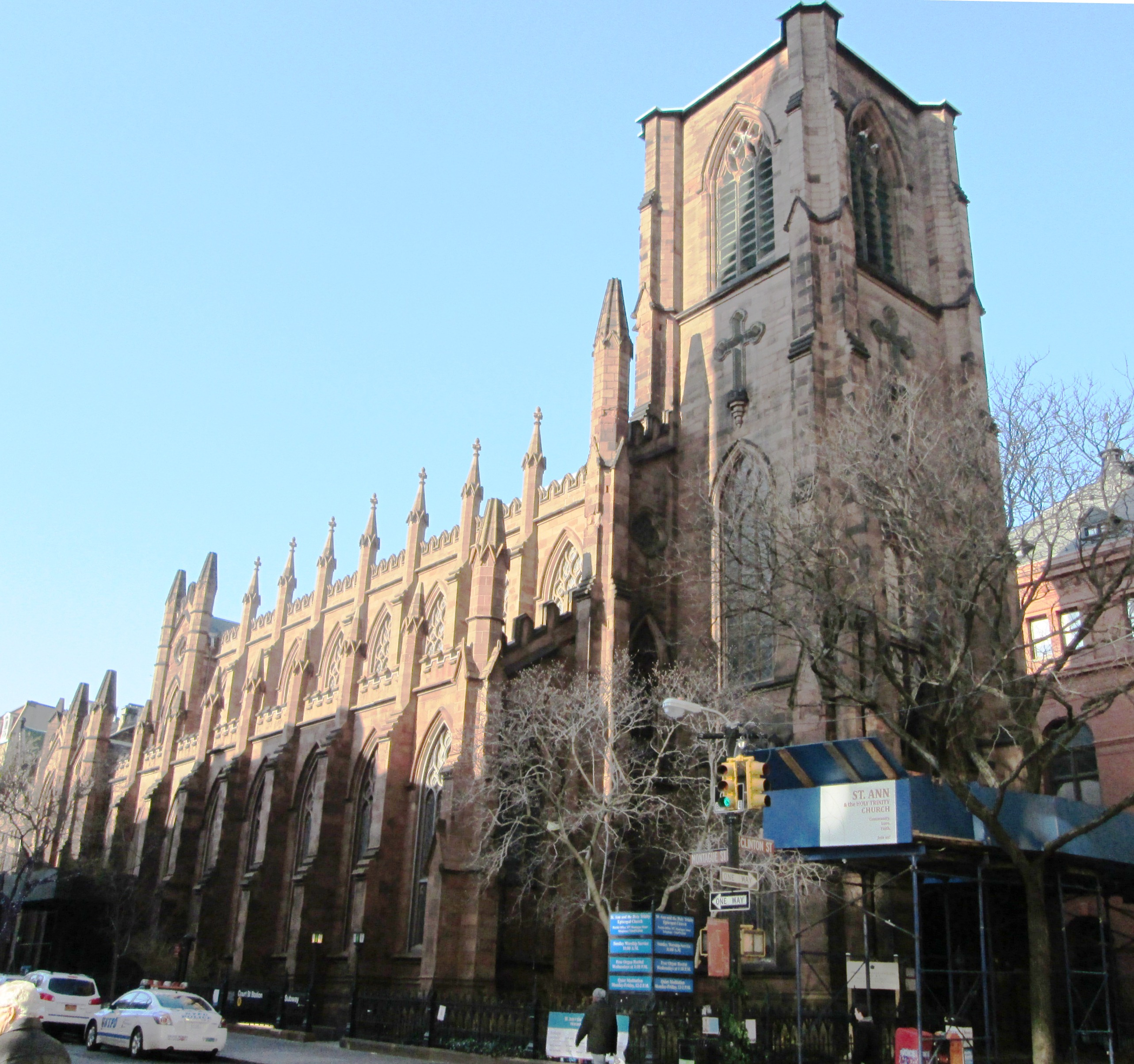
St Ann's Church in Brooklyn; the Greetings From Tim Buckley venue

A task given to Nichols, who contacted Buckley's original manager Herb Cohen, was subsequently provided details on the musician's son, Jeff Buckley, and his own musical endeavours. This was new information to all concerned, and the contact was approached with hesitancy; "the least [we] could do was invite him to the concert as a courtesy" Nichols stated.

A month before the concert which took place on April 26, 1991, Nichols followed up correspondence with Jeff Buckley. The previously unsure and small voice she had heard, turned into a more determined and positive acceptance of her original invitation. What came of the agreement was the cover of his $338 airfare from Los Angeles, and the chance to perform.

Arriving 6 days before the concert took place, Jeff Buckley sat in on a night of rehearsals, his presence described by Lucas as "the very image of the young Tim Buckley… same sensual, red-lipped mouth, same sensitive, haunted, blazing eyes".

After watching Lucas rehearse and proclaiming his long-lived adoration of Lucas’ guitar style and the Captain Beefheart discography, Jeff Buckley eagerly asked to work on an arrangement for 'The King's Chain', a track on Tim's Sefronia album of 1973.

The duo's musical relationship began the following day, on April 21, 1991, when Buckley went to Lucas’ West Village apartment to rehearse. Accompanied by Lucas’ 1946 Gibson J-45 acoustic guitar, the pair jammed to an experimental, looped acoustic backdrop. Recalling the first time hearing Jeff sing, Lucas stated "he closed his eyes and honey poured forth".

The pair also jammed to a "back-porch blues lick", with Buckley improvising lyrics overtop, their first original collaboration was born; 'Bluebird Blues'. In a memoir recounting the relationship between the pair, Lucas alludes to this afternoon as the turning point in his aspirations for Gods and Monsters, specifically the longing of replacing Julia Heyward as the group's leading vocalist and collaborator.

Upon the conclusion of their private rehearsal, Buckley agreed to joining Lucas professionally; "I love the name Gods and Monsters… and I’d love to sing with you".

== Music ==
The chronology of tracks established on the Songs To No One 1991—1992 album ultimately began with two guitar instrumentals written by Gary Lucas in early June 1991, both of which were composed on Lucas’ 1964 black Stratocaster, in drop D tuning. Finalised in ten days, Lucas posted the two tapes to Buckley, who at that point, had returned to Los Angeles, and suggested that he write some lyrics.

=== "Mojo Pin" ===
The first of these tracks was entitled 'And You Will', which would later form the musical template for 'Mojo Pin'. The piece began as a finger-style improvisation. Lucas describes the first phrasing of the song as "a questioning motif based on a diminished chord to a definitive answering motif in A-minor". Lucas refers to the structure of this instrumental as "four stop-and-start cluster-bursts of 16th-note chords that ascend skyward, then dip down back into minor key hell, and finally resolve in a grand, fermata’d D-major chord, bringing sweet relief".

As a keeper of journals, Buckley's lyrics stemmed long before his collaboration with Lucas. According to collection of diary entries and notes released by Buckley's estate in the book 'His Own Voice', the lyrics which partnered with the 'And You Will' instrumental, date back to November 22, 1989.

=== "Grace" ===
Directly after completing the bones of 'Mojo Pin', Lucas maintained the drop-d tuning, revisited an incomplete instrumental and 'Rise Up To Be' was finished. Again, with the lyrical input of Buckley, this track was renamed 'Grace'. In the same way as the 'Mojo Pin' template was formed, 'Grace' began as finger style progression, albeit in 6/8. Lucas attributes the term "funeral waltz" to the intro, which follows an F-minor 7th to a G-minor 7th before resolving on an E-minor.

=== "Hymne à l'amour" ===
Credited on the album as a piece belonging to Edith Piaf and Marguerite Monnot, the underlying instrumental was written by Lucas. Akin to later developed musical styles of both Buckley and Lucas, the track is performed in drop d tuning. Recorded on January 22, 1992, on a DAT recorder, this version arose out of a d-modal improvisation in Lucas’ apartment. The single take was then edited down to 11 minutes and 35 seconds by Hal Willner.

=== "She Is Free" ===
Another home recording from the Lucas residence, the version of 'She Is Free' that appears on Songs to No One 1991—1992 was also edited by Willner. Under the instruction of Mary Guibert, the track contains overdubs from Bill Frisell and Sex Mob. In the CD liner notes, Guibert notes that "their subtle contributions to Satisfied Mind and She Is Free’ add a particularly enjoyable dimension otherwise absent from the original recordings.

=== "How Long Will It Take" ===
Inspiration for the inclusion of Pat Kelly's 'How Long Will It Take' on Songs to No One 1991—1992 came from Lucas' solo guitar tour of the UK in early 1992. Lucas' tour manager, an avid reggae fan, introduced Lucas to 'How Long Will It Take' while on the road in between shows. "Jeff would be great singing this … this is the perfect song for us to cover!" Lucas wrote in Touched by Grace.

"How Long Will It Take" became a staple performance for the duo; its CBGB version is what appears on Songs to No One 1991—1992.

== Recording and production ==
The recording and production of Songs To No One 1991—1992 began August 14, 1991. Upon Buckley's return to New York, the pair ran through both instrumentals. On this day 'And You Will' became 'Mojo Pin', and 'Rise Up To Be' became 'Grace' formally, both of which exist as unreleased home demo tapes, and later appeared on Buckley's solo debut album of the same name.

Lucas contacted Gods and Monsters bassist Jared Nickerson and drummer Tony Lewis in the hopes of organising a full band rehearsal, which took place on August 16, 1991, at Countdown Studios in the West Village. Once the newly formed band had an agreed arrangement, and Buckley had finalised his lyrics, Lucas booked a session at Krypton Studios in Soho, to record the next day.

=== Krypton Studios ===
Krypton Studios was an underground basement studio at 150 Mercer Street in New York, run by Lovenotes Music production owner, Murray Weinstock.

On August 17, 1991, at 1pm, Lucas, Nickerson and Lewis arrived at Krypton Studios to lay down a backing for both 'Grace' and 'Mojo Pin'. Buckley arrived at the studio later that afternoon at 5pm to cut vocal takes. With the aim of producing two demos worthy of a record deal, this sessions proved successful in granting the pair with a $10,000 experimental partnership with Imago records.

However, only the 'Grace' demo from this session was included on the final Songs To No One 1991—1992 album.

=== Home recordings ===
Whilst the majority of tracks on this album were first home tapes at the point of their inception, tracks 1, 4, 8 and 9, are the only rehearsal demos recorded at the Lucas residence that were included in the final compilation.

=== CBGB ===
The last show Gods and Monsters played with Buckley was a midnight slot at CBGB on April 23, 1992. From the bootleg recording of this concert, the cover track 'How Long Will It Take' was incorporated into Songs To No One 1991—1992, making it the last recorded song on the album.

=== Club Roulette ===
A bonus live track of 'Grace' appears on Songs To No One 1991—1992, recorded at Club Roulette in New York, April 5, 1992.

=== Knitting Factory ===
The remainder of tracks on Songs To No One 1991–1992, are live recordings from shows at the Knitting Factory between March and April 1992.

== Track listing ==
All songs were written by Jeff Buckley and Gary Lucas, except where noted.

1. "Hymne à l'amour" (Edith Piaf, Marguerite Monnot) (Duet*; Rehearsal Tape; recorded at Lucas Residence, NY City; 2/92) – 11:30
2. "How Long Will It Take" (Pat Kelly) (Duet*; Soundboard tape; recorded at CBGB, NY City; 4/23/92) – 5:17
3. "Mojo Pin" (Duet*; Soundboard Tape; recorded at the Knitting Factory, NY City; 4/18/92) – 5:44
4. "Song to No One" (Duet*; Rehearsal Tape; recorded at Lucas Residence, NY City; 10/91) – 3:41
5. "Grace" (Band**; Studio Demo, recorded at Krypton Studios, NY City; 8/17/91) – 4:15
6. "Satisfied Mind" (Red Hayes, Jack Rhodes) (Solo****; Live broadcast from the Knitting Factory on Nicholas Hill's Music Faucet, WFMU; 3/22/92) – 3:24
7. "Cruel" (Band***; Live broadcast from the Knitting Factory on Nicholas Hill's Music Faucet, WFMU; 3/22/92) – 5:29
8. "She Is Free" (Duet*****; Rehearsal Tape; recorded at Lucas Residence, NY City; 1/92) – 4:30
9. "Harem Man" (Duet*; Rehearsal Tape; recorded at Lucas Residence, NY City; 1/92) – 5:45
10. "Malign Fiesta (No Soul)" (Band***; Live broadcast from the Knitting Factory on Nicholas Hill's Music Faucet, WFMU; 3/22/92) – 4:21
11. "Grace" (Live) (Duet*; Soundboard tape; recorded at club Roulette, NY City; 4/5/92) – 6:27

"*" = Jeff Buckley (vocals) / Gary Lucas (guitars)
"**" = Jeff Buckley (vocals, harmonica) / Gary Lucas (guitar) / Jared Nickerson (bass) / Tony Lewis (drums)
"***" = Jeff Buckley (vocal, guitar) / Gary Lucas (guitar) / Tony Maimone (bass) / Anton Fier (drums)
"****" = Jeff Buckley (vocal, guitar) / Bill Frisell (guitars)
"*****" = Jeff Buckley (vocal, guitar) / Gary Lucas (guitar) / With Sex Mob
(Steven Berstein: trumpet; Briggan Krauss: baritone sax; Tony Scherr: bass; Kenny Wollesen: drums; Brian Mitchell: organ)

== Personnel ==
=== Gary Lucas ===
The chronological plan for these recordings were to ultimately form the basis of a debut album for Gods and Monsters. However, due to the breakdown of the collaboration in 1992, these tracks remained archived until 2002.

Instead, these tapes became the backbone of a posthumous project. Songs To No One 1991—1992 was an idea originally pitched by Gary Lucas, with the aim of documenting the pair's musical collaboration during this time.

=== Mary Guibert ===
The compilation lay under the direction of Buckley's mother, Mary Guibert — who holds jurisdiction over Buckley's estate. The production choices made by Guibert, specifically to rework tracks with newer musical contributions, led to Lucas’ lack of artistic control and overall negative response to its release, stating that "it did not quite turn out like I envisioned, to say the least".

=== Hal Willner ===
Hal Willner, who remained friends of both Buckley and Lucas after meeting at St Ann's in 1991, was responsible for both the track listing on Songs To No One 1991—1992, as well as producing the additional overdubs and reworked songs that were also included on the album.

In the CD liner notes, Willner further explained his role in the compiling of this work:

"These tracks were originally recorded for demo purposes and never intended for release. I am usually suspicious of this kind of thing, but I decided to take it on because I knew that this project or a similar one would be done eventually whether it was authorised or not, so I told myself that Jeff would have wanted me to do it."

=== Jack Vartoogian ===
In February 1992, Buckley and Lucas visited photographer Jack Vartoogian’s home studio in New York to take publicity photos for the then upcoming March Gods and Monsters show back at St Ann's. The photos taken not only appeared in advertisements for the show, but used as the front and back covers of both Lucas’ book, Touched by Grace, and Songs To No One 1991—1992.

== Reception ==
Songs To No One 1991—1992 is the third posthumous release under Jeff Buckley's name. Although audiences had high hopes of getting an insight into the musician at the beginning of his solo career, its response was mixed.

=== Charts ===
Songs To No One 1991–1992
| Organisation | Rating/Peak Position |
|---|---|
| Pitchfork | 7.8/10 |
| Rolling Stone | 3/5 |
| Billboard (Independent Album Charts) | #21 |

The album fell short for a lot of Buckley fans who had already had access to two previous posthumous releases, Mystery White Boy and Live At L’Olympia, both of which were unanimously agreed as being worthwhile releases. Songs To No One 1991—1992 however divided fans between articulating the album as a historical archive, and those who found it an irrelevant addition to both artist's discographies. A reviewer on Amazon wrote "Songs To No One is hard to stomach, why listen to crappy versions of 'Grace' and 'Mojo Pin' when you could just listen to them on Grace?".

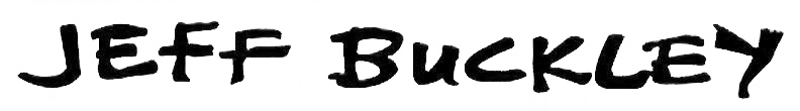
Handwritten Jeff Buckley logo that would later appear on Buckley's solo concert advertisements and merchandise

Although fans' responses were divided, its professional reception was exponentially more positive. Bringing attention to the opening track 'Hymne à l’Amour', the Edith Piaf cover was praised for its experimental loops and Qawwali vocal influence. Pitchfork journalist Dominique Leone described this track as able to transform "a quaint melody into an alluring raga".

Both Rolling Stone and Pitchfork journalists determined that the album was a snapshot of Buckley's and Lucas’ brief musical encounter, arguing that it is "less a conventional album than an imperfect premonition of greatness".
