= Gods and Monsters =

Gods and Monsters may refer to:

== Film ==
- Gods and Monsters (film), a 1998 film about film director James Whale
- Justice League: Gods and Monsters, a 2015 direct-to-video animated superhero film
- "Chapter One: Gods and Monsters", the first chapter of the DC Universe

== Television ==
- "Gods and Monsters" (Moon Knight), an episode of television series Moon Knight
- "Gods and Monsters" (The Vampire Diaries), an episode of TV series The Vampire Diaries

== Music ==
- Gods and Monsters (band), a New York rock band

=== Albums ===
- Gods and Monsters (I Am Kloot album)
- Gods and Monsters (Juno Reactor album)
- Gods and Monsters (Gary Lucas album)

=== Songs ===
- "Gods & Monsters" (song), a song by Lana Del Rey from her EP Paradise
- "Gods and Monsters", a song by John 5 from the album Songs For Sanity

== Other ==
- Gods and Monsters (audio drama), based on Doctor Who
- Immortals Fenyx Rising, a 2020 video game by Ubisoft previously titled Gods and Monsters
