= Jann Klose =

German musical artist

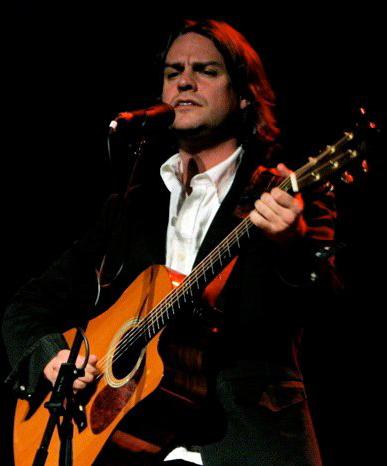

Background information
- Origin: Mannheim, Germany
- Genres: Singer Songwriter, Rock, Pop, Alternative Pop, Folk, chamber pop, blues
- Occupations: Singer-songwriter, musician
- Instruments: Vocals, guitar, piano, bass
- Label: Gallo Record Company
- Website: www.jannklose.com

Jann Klose is a German pop singer-songwriter, who has released eight albums and two EPs. Based in New York City, Klose was raised in Kenya, South Africa, Germany, and northeast Ohio. His original songs have charted on Top 40 radio in the United States and South Africa. He is the singing voice of Tim Buckley in the movie Greetings from Tim Buckley, starring Penn Badgley and Imogen Poots, released by Focus Features and Tribeca Film. In an interview with Entertainment Tonight, Jann talks about guitarist and collaborator Gary Lucas recommending him to director Dan Algrant to sing in the movie. He has performed as an actor and singer in touring companies of Broadway musicals, including Jesus Christ Superstar, Jekyll & Hyde, and The Who's Tommy as well as made for TV movies, voice overs and commercials. In 2005, the off-Broadway production Moonlight Interior, a musical based on Klose's music and directed by Yoel Cassell, premiered in New York City.

He has periodically collaborated with members of classical rock group Renaissance, most recently recording a version of Peter Gabriel's classic hit song "Don't Give Up" with Annie Haslam. Jann tours regularly in the U.S., Europe, Africa and Asia. He has worked with a wide range of artistcs including Pat Benatar, John Oates of Hall and Oates, Suzanne Vega, Paula Cole, Rachel Flowers, Brett Dennen, Ann Hampton Callaway, Liz Callaway, Marcella Detroit, Karen Zoid, RJ Benjamin, Rusted Root, Vonda Shepard, Gary Hoey, Jeffrey Gaines, Bret Michaels, Willy Porter, The Strawbs, Rosanne Cash, The Byrds' Roger McGuinn, Marty Stuart, The Yardbirds' Jim McCarty, Elliott Murphy, Pete Seeger and Les Paul.

== Early life ==
Klose was born in Mannheim, Germany and raised in Nairobi, Kenya and Johannesburg, South Africa where he attended grade school. He moved to Hamburg, Germany as a teenager and first came to the United States as an exchange student, attending an American Field Service (AFS) program in the suburbs of Cleveland, Ohio. At this time he began teaching himself the keyboard and subsequently guitar as well as singing and dancing in the high school show choir. He returned to Hamburg, Germany to finish Gymnasium (high school) and started playing out, first in subway stations, the high school's band and then local clubs in Hamburg's Reeperbahn red-light district.

== Music career ==
Between 1998 and 2000, Klose studied voice with composer/conductor and Emmy Award winner David Gooding who had Klose join various ensembles, including the choirs at Fairmount Temple, St. Peter's church in Lakewood, Ohio and the Cleveland Opera Chorus with whom he performed in operas Carmen, La Traviata, Lucia di Lammermoor, Romeo et Juliet and HMS Pinafore. In 2000 Jann relocated to New York City and started auditioning for musical theatre jobs. After three months in the City he was cast as the Pinball Wizard in NJPAC's production of The Who's Tommy and then went on to tour with Broadway's Jekyll & Hyde and in 2001 the European tour of Jesus Christ Superstar.

Black Box EP (2003)

In 2002, Klose met Grammy Award-winning producer/guitarist Marlon J. Graves and recorded Black Box EP which he self-released in 2003. Jann and upright bassist Chris Marolf then started touring vigorously in the Northeast and Midwest U.S., developing a loyal following. Black Box EP received adult album alternative and college radio airplay and the title track was placed in the Warner Bros. film, Dead Broke which starred Paul Sorvino and also featured music from David Byrne. The track also received a placement on MTV Cribs. His song "It's Not The Way" off the EP was included on the sampler album, Prambors Hits 3, in Indonesia and led to heavy rotation airplay on Top 40 station Prambors FM in Jakarta, Indonesia.

Moonlight Interior (2005)

Moonlight Interior, an Off-Broadway production, directed and choreographed by Yo-el Cassell, had a sold-out run in April 2005 at the Sande Shurin Theatre. The show centered around Klose's songs which he performed live with Chris Marolf (upright bass) and new band members Patrick Carmichael (drums) and Roberta Piket (keys). The show also included music by Beethoven and soundscapes by Pavel Zustiak. Lars Potteiger (keys, accordion) replaced Roberta Piket and the group, in various formations, increased touring to over 75 shows per year.

Reverie (2007)

In 2007, Jann began work on his third album Reverie, Stewart Lerman and the guidance of Rob Grenoble at Water Music Recorders in Hoboken, New Jersey. The album featured over 15 musicians and singers, including new bandmates Leah Potteiger (violin) and Megan Marolf (oboe) as well as guest musicians Ryan Scott, Doug Hinrichs, Roosevelt Credit, Pedro da Silva, Dan Brantigan and Peter Sachon. The album was mastered by Dominick Maita (Airshow Mastering).

Partially fan-funded, Reverie gained substantial airplay on Adult album alternative, college, talk, Top 40, Internet and Satellite Radio stations, including SiriusXM and the BBC in the UK. Klose continued to tour, now averaging 100 shows per year and stepping into new markets including California, the United Kingdom, Ireland, Germany and France. Klose's song "Give in to This Life" off Reverie is included on the Grammy-nominated double album, Healthy Food For Thought: Good Enough To Eat (East Coast Recording Co.) alongside works by Julian Lennon, Moby, Russell Simmons, Tom Chapin, Uncle Floyd and cover art by Peter Max.

Doing Time Music Video and Sacrifice EP (2010)

In 2010, Klose collaborated with students at the New York Film Academy for a music video for his song "Doing Time." Directed by Addison Neville the video was shot in stop motion. Together with the video he released Sacrifice EP, his 5th release and 2nd EP.

Mosaic (2013)

Jann Klose's album Mosaic (release date 25 June 2013) was produced by David Bendeth and Grammy winner James Frazee. The album features nine originals and one cover Tim Buckley's Song to the Siren and was mastered by double Grammy winner Warren Russell-Smith. Carrie Newcomer is a guest vocalist and Florian Opahle (Ian Anderson, Greg Lake) and David Bendeth are guest guitarists. MOSAIC entered the Roots Radio charts above Bruce Springsteen, Sheryl Crow and Wilco at No. 22. The album ended up on first round ballots for the 2014 Grammy Awards for Album of the Year and Pop Vocal Album and is the recipient of three 2014 Independent Music Awards. A "Special Edition" of MOSAIC was released on 2 December 2014 and features a total of six bonus tracks, including the unreleased song "Anything".

Stereopticon (2016)

8 January 2016, saw the release of an acoustic pop/urban Americana collaboration with guitarist Gary Lucas, STEREOPTICON on Cosmic Trigger Records, called "exciting" by DC Rocks and receiving a 4 STAR rating from Mojo (magazine). Songs "Secret Wings," "Fairweather," "Julia," and "Let No One Come Between Us" continue to receive airplay on AAA radio in the U.S. and Europe

In Tandem (2018/2019)

During a BMI writers camp in September 2016 in Cape Town, Klose met several well-known South African songwriters including Karen Zoid, RJ Benjamin, Tamara Dey, James Stewart, Jonathan "Ziyon" Hamilton and Shekhinah. Held during the annual Music Exchange conference in Cape Town, South Africa he was introduced to Nick Matsukis who invited Klose to record an album at the Academy of Sound Engineering in Johannesburg. RJ Benjamin agreed to produce the album and recording commenced over a 6 week period in April and May 2017. During the same time Klose attended a TutuDesk handover event in Limpopo Province. Final recording and mixing by Rici Martins were completed in September 2017. Significant buzz was created during the production of the album and both Sony Music SA and Gallo Record Company approached Jann to license the album. In February 2018 Gallo signed Jann and the IN TANDEM album with an option for a 2nd album. The first single "Take Me 2 Forever" was released on 13 April 2018 with the album made available on 25 May 2018. Album release parties in Johannesburg, South Africa, Hamburg, Germany and New York City followed.

IN TANDEM received significant attention including spiking on Apple Music in July 2018. This spike of over 50,000 streams lead to the attention of Big Management in New York City who (after attending the New York City album release show at The Cutting Room) signed Jann to a management deal in November 2018 and secured a distribution deal for several singles off IN TANDEM via The Orchard/SONY. The singles "Don't Give Up" (featuring Annie Haslam of Renaissance, written by Peter Gabriel,) "Love High," "Take Me 2 Forever" and "Pour the Champagne" (featuring Karen Zoid) received over half a million streams on Spotify and YouTube between April and September 2019. "Pour the Champagne" charted on several South African radio stations including Jacaranda FM Top 20 in June 2019.

Surrender (2023)

In September 2017 while still finishing work on the IN TANDEM album, Jann attended a 2nd Broadcast Music Inc writers camp in Cape Town. Additional writers included Amanda Black, Christian Wright (of Abbey Road Studios), Alicia Madison and Tony Grund. Klose wrote "Love You the Most" with Alicia and Tony on day one of the camp. The song caught the attention of "Married Young" film producer Morey Levovitz who used the track to promote the movie. Released on 3 September 2019 with a music video released on 6 September 2019. Produced by David Schoenwetter and Jann Klose, the duet with Alicia Madison became Klose's most viewed and streamed track to date passing 3 million views and streams on YouTube and Spotify alone. A Spanish version of the song entitled "Te Amaré Más" was released together with a music video again featuring scenes from "Married Young" on 11 December 2020. The music video exceeded 1.1 million views on YouTube by February 2021. In the Spring and Summer of 2021 the original English version of the song started gaining airplay on Top 40 radio in the U.S., peaking at position #49 on the Mediabase chart.

Klose continued to release singles, each finding radio airplay, and charting on Top 40 radio in the US and South Africa. "Pilot Light" was the first, a dedication to his late manager Gary Salzman, who died from COVID-19 early in the pandemic. The following single "Sugar My". peaked at #36 on the Mediabase Top 40 radio charts and was quickly followed with the release of the single "Flesh and Blood" which once again featured dancers from the Lee Lund School of Dance in Connecticut. Klose continued his collaboration with music video director Alex Vishno and signed a licensing deal for the "Surrender" album with Honey Rose Records.

=== Touring ===
Klose has opened for or shared the stage with a wide variety of musicians, including John Oates of Hall and Oates, Pat Benatar, Suzanne Vega, Brett Dennen, Paula Cole, The Yardbirds, Pete Seeger, Willy Porter, The Strawbs, Rusted Root and the group's lead singer Michael Glabicki, Rebecca Loebe, Gary Hoey, Jeffrey Gaines, Antigone Rising, Melissa Ferrick, Marshall Crenshaw, Jonathan Edwards, Jorma Kaukonen, Dan Hicks and multi-track recording inventor/performer Les Paul.

Klose received invitations to collaborate with Renaissance's Annie Haslam and keyboardist John Tout for a sold-out show at the Sellersville Theater, in Sellersville, Pennsylvania. Annie had heard Klose perform at the CD release party for Serenity House (East Coast Recording Co.) which also included works by Ian Anderson (Jethro Tull), Pat DiNizio (The Smithereens), Robert Hazard and Kathy Sledge (Sister Sledge). In 2009 he opened for Renaissance on their 40th anniversary reunion tour at performing arts centers and theaters in the Northeast U.S., including The Concert Hall, The Keswick Theatre and The Trump Taj Mahal in Atlantic City.

Jann performed at Martin Guitar's 175th Anniversary concert with Marty Stuart, Roger McGuinn, and Rosanne Cash and has toured extensively with rock troubadour Elliott Murphy, whose band The Normandy All Stars backed him at a show in Le Havre, France in 2009. Rock and Roll Hall of Fame inductee Joey Reynolds regularly featured Klose on his syndicated radio show. WGN Chicago's overnight radio team Steve and Johnnie (Steve King and Johnnie Putman) presented Jann in concert to a full house at the Skokie Theatre. Klose has performed at the annual Jeff Buckley Tribute at Uncommon Ground in Chicago three times (2008–2010) and at Gary Lucas' Buckley Tribute at the Knitting Factory in Brooklyn, NY, March 2011. In October 2011, Jann performed dates in Ontario, with The Yardbirds' and Renaissance co-founder Jim McCarty and former Strawbs/Renaissance keyboardist John Hawken for a Chamber Pop Summit.

=== Podcasting ===
In 2020 Klose launched the podcast "Making Sound with Jann Klose" which features conversations with friends and colleagues from the music, film, theatre and tech industries. The show has featured over 140 episodes and guests such as Howard Jones, Simon Kirke (Bad Company), Mark Farner (Grand Funk Railroad), Christine Ohlman (Saturday Night Live band), John Mahon (Elton John Band), Bakithi Kumalo (Paul Simon), Everett Bradley (Bon Jovi, Seal, Bruce Springsteen), Marcella Detroit (Eric Clapton, Shakespears Sister).

=== Style ===
Critics have compared Klose to a range of modern-day and old school artists including Paul McCartney, Kevin Gilbert, XTC, Elliott Smith, Francis Dunnery, Seal, Paul Simon, Nick Drake, Eric Matthews, Sting, Jacques Brel, Kurt Weill, Elliott Smith, and a less risque Serge Gainsbourg.

== Discography ==
Solo albums

- Enough Said
- The Strangest Thing
- Black Box EP
- Reverie
- Sacrifice EP
- Mosaic
- Mosaic (Special Edition)
- In Tandem
- Surrender
- The Future Trap

Collaborations

- Stereopticon with Gary Lucas
- Don't Give Up (Single) with Annie Haslam
- Pour the Champagne (Single, Music Video) with Karen Zoid
- Love You the Most (Single, Music Video) with Alicia Madison
- Te Amaré Más (Single, Music Video) with Alicia Madison
- Walking in the Air - Theme from The Snowman (Album Track) with Liz Callaway
- You & I (Single) with Tamara Dey
- The Lost Kingdom (Single) with Rachel Flowers
- Hurting Nobody (Single) with Marcella Detroit

Musicals

- The Who's Tommy – actor/singer
- Jekyll & Hyde – actor/singer
- Jesus Christ Superstar – actor/singer
- Moonlight Interior – actor/singer/writer/guitarist

Compilations

- Healthy Food For Thought – 2011 Grammy Award Nomination
- Action Moves People – 2013
- Action Moves People United – 2016
- Christmas Passion – 2018

TV

- MTV Cribs – Featured Song Black Box
- Jägermeister – Voiceover tag line at end of "Be the Meister" Ad Campaign

Film

- Married Young (Amazon) – Featured Song Love You the Most
- One Little Finger – Featured Song Let Me Be Brave
- Katie Fforde: Mein Sohn und seine Väter (ZDF Television, Germany) – Actor, Kenneth Holland
- The Beauty of Disaster (Glimmer Girl) – Film Score, Featured Songs Hold Me Down, Beautiful Dream
- A Venue For The End Of The World (Devil Blue Films, BrinkVision) – Featured Songs Clouds, The Beginning
- Greetings from Tim Buckley (Focus World/Tribeca/Universal) – Singing Voice of Tim Buckley and Guitar
- Dead Broke (Warner Bros) – Featured Song Black Box
