= A Hundred Pounds of Clay =

Single by Gene McDaniels

from the album 100 Lbs. Of Clay!
- B-side: "Come On Take a Chance"
- Released: February 1961
- Genre: Soul
- Length: 2:22
- Label: Liberty Records 55308
- Songwriters: Kay Rogers, Luther Dixon, Bob Elgin
- Producer: Snuff Garrett

Gene McDaniels singles chronology
"A Hundred Pounds of Clay" (1961)	"A Tear" (1961)

"A Hundred Pounds of Clay" is a song written by Kay Rogers, Luther Dixon, and Bob Elgin and performed by Gene McDaniels. The song was produced by Snuff Garrett. Earl Palmer played drums on the song. The song appeared on McDaniels' 1961 album 100 Lbs. Of Clay!

== Chart performance ==
The song reached No. 3 on the Billboard Hot 100 pop chart and No. 11 on the R&B chart in 1961. The song peaked at No.3 in New Zealand and peaked at No.2 in Australia.

== Other versions ==
- Craig Douglas's cover version went to #9 on the UK Singles Chart in 1961. (See "song controversy" below.)
- Dalida released a French version of the song in 1961 entitled "Avec Une Poignée De Terre".
- Arthur Alexander released a version on his 1962 debut album for Dot Records You Better Move On.
- The Impressions released a version on their 1967 album, The Fabulous Impressions.
- Dickie Goodman sampled the song in his 1973 novelty song, "The Touchables In Brooklyn".
- Gary Lucas released a version on his 1998 album, Busy Being Born.
- The Belmonts released a version on their 2009 album, The Belmonts Anthology Vol. 1 Featuring A Hundred Pounds of Clay.
- Dee Dee Sharp released a version on her It's Mashed Potato Time album, changing the lyrics to "two hundred pounds" and dedicating the song to Chubby Checker.
- Enrique Guzman released a version in México, named "Cien kilos de barro" in 1962.

== Song controversy ==
In the early 1960s, the BBC banned the song and wouldn't allow British radio stations to play it. The BBC censors, believing that the song suggested that women were created only to be sexual beings, regarded it as blasphemous.
