= RJ Benjamin =

South African singer-songwriter and director

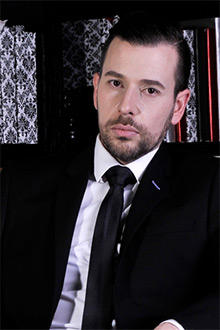
- Born: Roy J. Benjamin
- Education: Allenby Campus School
- Occupations: director; Vocal Coach; Singer; Songwriter; producer
- Musical career
- Origin: Johannesburg, South Africa
- Genres: Contemporary R&B; Soul; Acid Jazz; Light Rock
- Instruments: vocals; piano
- Years active: 2004–present
- Labels: Soul Candi (former); Ghetto Ruff
- Website: rjbenjamin.co.za

RJ Benjamin is a South African award-winning vocalist, songwriter, composer, vocal coach, musical director and producer. Ghetto Ruff owner, Lance Stehr, once described him as "the best composer/singer/musician this country [South Africa] has ever produced".

He graduated from the Allenby Campus School Of Contemporary Music in 2000. In those formative years, RJ cemented several professional and personal relationships with fellow Allenby Alumni such as DJ Cleo, Proverb, Elvis Blue and Robin Kohl. Some of his most successful students include winner of Idols SA season 10 Vincent Bones, Vusi Nova, Naaq Musiq and Anatii.

== Television career ==
He was chosen to be head vocal coach on the music talent TV reality show Project Fame. In 2013, he became the Musical Director Of "Idols South Africa" and "Clash Of The Choirs Season 1". He would reprise his role on the SAFTA award-winning "Clash Of The Choirs Season 2" while becoming the "In-House Mentor" on subsequent seasons of Idols South Africa.

== Discography ==
=== Studio albums ===
- Who I Am (2004)

In 2004, RJ Benjamin released his debut album Who I Am, through the Ghetto Ruff record label, which has been described as funkadelic [Neo Soul] played by top jazz musicians. This album featured collaborations with the Flash Republic, vocalist Tamara Dey, Kwaito/Hip Hop MC Pitch Black Afro, Artist & Producer Amu and R&B sensation Ishmael. 37MPH and Bongani Fassie also contributed to the album as producers on select tracks.

| Track listing | Written by RJ | Produced by RJ | Feature |
|---|---|---|---|
| "Journey (The Storm)" | Co-writer | ✔ | |
| "Wonderwall" | | ✔ | |
| "Cry" | Co-writer | 37 mph | |
| "Restless" | Co-writer | Co-Producer | Pitch Black Afro |
| "In 2 My Heart" | Co-writer | ✔ | |
| "Letting Go" | | ✔ | Amu |
| "C U in My Dreams" | Co-writer | ✔ | |
| "Lovespent" | Co-writer | ✔ | |
| "Here With Me" | ✔ | ✔ | |
| "I Wont Forget It" | ✔ | ✔ | |
| "Play Around" | Co-writer | Co-producer | Ishmael |
| "G-d Bless My Imagination" | ✔ | ✔ | |
| "What'll It Be" | Co-writer | ✔ | |
| "Who I Am" | ✔ | ✔ | |
| "What Do You Need?" | ✔ | ✔ | |
| "Consequence" | Co-writer | Co-Producer | Tamara Dey |

=== Swimming in the Soul of Music ===
RJ Benjamin's 2008 release, Swimming in the Soul of Music, won the award for Best RnB Album at the Metro FM Awards later that year. The album is a mixture of Soul, Jazz and Funk. RJ has said that the album came about when he had lost his way in his life, prompting him to go back to his musical roots so he "drowned" himself in the creation of the album. Collaborators on the album include, Zubz, HHP, Dan Patlansky, Nothende, and Slikour.

| Track listing | Written by RJ | Produced by RJ | Feature |
|---|---|---|---|
| "Music" | ✔ | ✔ | |
| "Gonna Make It on My Own" | ✔ | ✔ | |
| "Say Yeah" | ✔ | | |
| "Without You" | Co-writer | ✔ | |
| "Shut Up" | Co-writer | ✔ | Zubz |
| "Burden" | ✔ | ✔ | |
| "Soulful Love" | ✔ | ✔ | |
| "Don't Wanna" | Co-writer | Co-produced | Nothende |
| "Anymore" | Co-writer | ✔ | |
| "Nothing Left But The Music" | Co-writer | ✔ | |
| "I Don't Love You" | ✔ | Co-Producer | Dan Patlansky |
| "I'm Good" | ✔ | ✔ | |
| "Overloaded" | Co-writer | | Hip Hop Pantsula |
| "Dreamer" | Co-writer | | Slikour |

=== House Bound ===
In 2009, RJ Benjamin recorded Change The World, which introduced him to South Africa's House music audience. This song of inspiration was featured on the Soul Candi Session 4 compilation album. It became an instant hit on radio stations and dance floors all over South Africa. The track was nominated for a Channel O Award and SAMA (South African Music Awards) for Best Dance Video and Song of the Year, respectively. It was also nominated for Remix of the year at the SAMAs. Following the huge success of Change the World, RJ released the album 'House Bound' which showcased his vocal and writing skills over house music. This flirtation with house music ultimately returned him back to his R&B/Soul roots and core sensibility.

| Track listing | Written by RJ | Produced by RJ | Feature |
|---|---|---|---|
| "Go On" | Co-writer | | |
| "The Moment" | Co-writer | | |
| "You Can Be Anything" | Co-writer | | |
| "Could You Be" | Co-writer | | |
| "Take It Right Back" | Co-writer | | |
| "2010 Change The World" | Co-writer | | Slikour |
| "Feels So Right" | Co-writer | | |
| "Into The Stars" | Co-writer | | Dr. Duda |
| "Blessed" | | | |
| "Goodbye Baby" | Co-writer | | |
| "Good Times" | Co-writer | | |
| "Love Again" | Co-writer | ✔ | Danny K |
| "Free Your Mind" | Co-writer | | |

=== Inside ===
After three years of a self-imposed sabbatical, RJ Benjamin remixed and "soulified" House tracks featured on his House Bound album, as well as popular House tracks on which he was featured with Dr Duda, DJ Kent and DJ Fresh to create Inside (2012), re-interpreting them into Funk, Soul, Rock, Flamenco, Samba, Jazz and various other styles

| Track listing | Written by RJ | Produced RJ | Feature |
|---|---|---|---|
| "Slowly" | Co-writer | ✔ | |
| "Lifting Me into The Stars" | Co-writer | ✔ | |
| "Runaway" | Co-writer | ✔ | |
| "If We Can Love Again" | Co-writer | ✔ | |
| "Her" | Writer | ✔ | |
| "Goodbye Baby" | Co-writer | ✔ | |
| "2012 Change The World" | Co-writer | ✔ | |
| "Free Your Mind" | Co-writer | ✔ | Clint Brink |
| "Let's Take It Right Back" | Co-writer | ✔ | |
| "Just The Moment" | Co-writer | ✔ | |
| "Why Don't We Go On?" | Co-writer | ✔ | |
| "Having Some Good Times" | Co-writer | ✔ | |
| "The Love" | Co-writer | ✔ | Aya |
| "Alright" | Co-writer | ✔ | |
| "See the Light" | Writer | ✔ | |

=== Other work ===
| Song | Artist | Album title | Year | Written by RJ | Produced by RJ | Feature | Other |
|---|---|---|---|---|---|---|---|
| "Someone To Hold" | Kyle Grant | When Dreams Go out to play | 2003 | Co-writer | | | |
| "Magic" | Zama Jobe | Ndawo Yami | 2004 | | | | Backing vocals |
| "Hey Hey" | Zama Jobe | Ndawo Yami | 2004 | | | | Backing vocals |
| "Restless" | Shimani ECT | Runnin' Bizz | 2004 | Co-writer | | | Backing vocals |
| "Jazzifield" | DJ Cleo | Eskhaleni & Mazansi House | 2004 | Co-writer | | ✔ | |
| "My love" | DJ Cleo | Eskhaleni | 2004 | Co-writer | | ✔ | |
| "Zoe" | DJ Cleo | Eskhaleni | 2004 | Co-writer | | ✔ | |
| "These Girls" | Slikour | Ventilation Mixtape vol. 1 | 2005 | | | ✔ | |
| "Let Me Change Your Mind" | Unathi | My 1st Time | 2005 | Co-writer | Co-Producer | | |
| "No Ciesta" | Elan Lea | Rock The World | 2005 | Co-writer | Co-Produced | | |
| "Do You Hear" | Elan Lea | Rock The World | 2005 | | Vocal Production | | |
| "If U Wanna B Free" | Elan Lea | Rock The World | 2005 | Co-writer | Co-Produced | | |
| "Mama My Hero" | Elan Lea | Rock The World | 2005 | | Vocal Production | | |
| "Someday" | Elan Lea | Rock The World | 2005 | Co-writer | Co-Produced | | |
| "Is This Where Its At" | Elan Lea | Rock the World | 2005 | | Co-produced | | |
| "Will Go On" | Elan Lea | Rock The World | 2005 | | Vocal Production | | |
| "Scream My Name" | Elan Lea | Rock The World | 2005 | Co-writer | Co-Produced | | |
| "Kick It One Time" | Elan Lea | Rock The World | 2005 | Co-writer | Co-Produced | | |
| "I Gotta Be Alone" | Elan Lea | Rock The World | 2005 | | Vocal Production | | |
| "Play That Song" | Kabelo | Bouga Luv Album | 2005 | Co-Produced | | | |
| "Everything" | Craig De Sousa | Everything | 2006 | Co-writer | | ✔ | ✔ |
| "Clothes off" | Danny K | This is My Time | 2006 | | | | Engineering & backing vocals |
| "1000 Sorry's" | Danny K | This is My Time | 2006 | | | | Engineering |
| "Everything About You" | Danny K | Think is My Time | 2006 | | | | Engineering, arrangement & backing vocals |
| "One Night" | Danny K | This is My Time | 2006 | Co-writer | | | |
| "It Doesn't Matter" | Danny K | This Is My Time | 2006 | | | | Engineering and Backing vocals |
| "I Must Still Love You" | Veronique ft Gift Gwe | As I Am | 2006 | Co-writer | | | |
| "Iris" | Lira | Feel Good | 2006 | Co-writer | Co-produced | | |
| "Good Times" | Ryan Dent | Platform Music Presents Ryan Dent | 2006 | Co-writer | | ✔ | |
| "I love You" | Danny K | This Is My Time | 2006 | Co-writer | Co-produced | | |
| "Love & Miracles" | Vicky Sampson | License To Sing | 2007 | | Co-Producer | ✔ | |
| "I'm Still Here" | Vicky Sampson | License To Sing | 2007 | | Co-producer | | |
| "Heart of Stone" | Vicky Sampson | License to Sing | 2007 | | Co-Producer | | |
| "There's Only You" | Vicky Sampson | License To Sing | 2007 | | Co-Producer | | |
| "Vicky" | Vicky Sampson | License To Sing | 2007 | | Co-Producer | | |
| "I'm Gone " | Slikour | Ventilation Mixtape vol. 2 | 2007 | | | ✔ | |
| "Showbiz" | Slikour | Ventilation Mixtape vol. 2 | 2007 | Co-writer | | ✔ | |
| "Unstoppable" | Slikour | Music From | 2007 | | Vocal Production | | |
| "Dreamer" | Slikour | Ventilation Mixtape vol. 2 | 2007 | Co-writer | | ✔ | |
| "This Is" | "Tumi" | Music From | 2007 | | | ✔ | |
| "When Doves Cry" | Dent & Massive | The Cover | 2007 | | | ✔ | |
| "Chasing Lies" | Gift gwe | Back To You | 2007 | ✔ | ✔ | | |
| "2 Lovers" | Gift Gwe | Back To You | 2007 | Co-writer | ✔ | | |
| "Back To You" | Gift Gwe | Back To You | 2007 | | Co-produced | | |
| "Madd Dogg" | Gift Gwe | Back To You | 2007 | | Co-produced | | |
| "Messed Up" | Gift Gwe | Back To You | 2007 | | Co-produced | | |
| "The Long Run" | Gift Gwe | Back To You | 2007 | | Co-produced | | |
| "Im Better With You" | Karin Kortje | Forever & a Day | 2007 | ✔ | | | |
| "Nothing Left But The Music" | Karin Kortje | Forever & a Day | 2007 | Co-writer | | | |
| "Back in Your Arms" | Karin Kortje | Forever & a Day | 2007 | ✔ | | | |
| "No Guarantee" | Tumi(Lane) | No Guarantee | 2008 | | Vocal Production | | |
| "If I Should" | Tumi(Lane) | No Guarantee | 2008 | | Vocal Production | | |
| "Lullaby" | Tumi(Lane) | No Guarantee | 2008 | | Vocal Production | | |
| "Trapped" | Tumi(Lane) | No Guarantee | 2008 | | Vocal Production | | |
| "You Played" | Tumi(Lane) | No Guarantee | 2008 | | Vocal Production | | |
| "Love You Girl" | Tumi(Lane) | No Guarantee | 2008 | | Vocal Production | | |
| "You Are Here" | Tumi(Lane) | No Guarantee | 2008 | | Vocal Production | | |
| "Ain't Not Good For You" | Tumi (Lane) | No Guarantee | 2008 | | Vocal Production | | |
| "Can I Make You Love Me" | Tumi (Lane) | No Guarantee | 2008 | | Vocal Production | | |
| "Give Me You" | Tumi (Lane) | No Guarantee | 2008 | | Vocal Production | | |
| "Gotta Be This Way" | Tumi (Lane) | No Guarantee | 2008 | | Vocal Production | | |
| "Here I" | Tumi (Lane) | No Guarantee | 2008 | | Vocal Production | | |
| "Rock The World" | ShugaSmakx ft Kwesta & HHP | Numba 1 | 2008 | | | ✔ | |
| "Change The World" | Matserjam (Dr Duda remix) | Soul Candi Sessions 4 | 2008 | | | ✔ | |
| "Shout" | Various artists | Campaign | 2009 | | | ✔ | |
| "Private Show (oh no)" | Zubz | Cochlea | 2009 | Co-writer | | ✔ | |
| "Tradition al Her" | Zubz | Cochlea | 2009 | | ✔ | | |
| "Monday to Sunday" | Kwesta & L-Tido | Hype Sessions/Jazzworx FM | 2009 | | | ✔ | |
| "A Dor Do Cupido" | Anselmo Raplh | | 2009 | | | | Arranged Strings |
| "Journey (37MPH Remix)" | 37MPH | 37 Energy Levels | 2009 | Co-writer | | ✔ | |
| "Say Yeah (Nutty Nys Remix)" | Nutty Nys | Vintage Love | 2009 | Co-writer | | ✔ | |
| "Show My Love" | Iridium Project | 2009 Audioflux | 2009 | Co-writer | | ✔ | |
| "Higher" | Giggs Superstar | Deep House Chronicles 4 | 2010 | Co-writer | | ✔ | |
| "Slowly" | Dj Kent | I Can't | 2010 | Co-writer | ✔ | | |
| "Not Love" | Molekane | My Good Eye | | | | | |
| "Words" | Kunle Ayo | Its About Time | 2010 | | | ✔ | |
| "Delafunk" | Negus | A L'ombre De La Lune Noire | 2010 | Co-writer | | ✔ | |
| "Don't Turn Your Back" | Franky Rizardo | Soul Candi Sessions 5 | 2010 | Co-writer | | ✔ | |
| "I'll Never Run Away" | Dr Duda | Soul Candi Sessions 5 | 2010 | Co-writer | | ✔ | |
| "Free Your Mind" | Chris Sen Remix | F.Eu | 2010 | Co-writer | | ✔ | |
| "Alright" | DJ Fresh | F.Eu | 2010 | Co-writer | | ✔ | |
| "Rise up" | Jen Su ft Jr & Loyiso Bala | | 2010 | | | ✔ | |
| "Sweet Obsession" | Jub Jub | Fresh Air | 2010 | Co-writer | ✔ | ✔ | |
| "Awete" | Liz Ogumbo | Kensoul | 2010 | | Co-produced | | |
| "Big Ass(Blues)" | Liz Ogumbo | Kensoul | 2010 | | Co-produced | | |
| "Give Them Hope" | Liz Ogumbo | Kensoul | 2010 | | Co-produced | ✔ | |
| "Ubuntu" | Liz Ogumbo | Kensoul | 2010 | | Co-produced | | |
| "Maropa More" | Liz Ogumbo | Kensoul | 2010 | | Co-produced | | |
| "Le Coeur Qui Crie" | Liz Ogumbo | Kensoul | 2010 | | Co-produced | | |
| "Could You Be (RJ's Take)" | RJ Benjamin | Da Essentials Vol 1 Pt1 | 2010 | Co-writer | Co-produced | ✔ | |
| "Butterfly" | Oran Cohen | Single | 2010 | | Produced | | |
| "Heaven's Song" | Zeus | Flipside | 2010 | | | ✔ | |
| "Anniversary Theme" | DJ Hamma ft Hishaam | Ctrl Alt Del | 2011 | | | ✔ | |
| "Real Man" | Kabomo | All Things Grey | 2011 | Co-writer | | ✔ | |
| "Pressure" | Rowick Deep | Unleashed | 2011 | Co-writer | | ✔ | |
| "Love To Remember" | Vusi Khumalo | Reasons For Seasons | 2011 | | | ✔ | |
| "If I Gave You Everything" | Antonio Lyons | We Dance We Pray | 2011 | Co-writer | | ✔ | |
| "Cry For Me" | Pebbles | Phenomenal | 2011 | Co-writer | ✔ | ✔ | |
| "Believe" | Pebbles | Phenomenal | 2011 | | Co-produced | | |
| "Higher" | Pebbles | Phenomenal | 2011 | | Vocal Production | | |
| "Ooh" | Pebbles | Phenomenal | 2011 | | Vocal Production | | |
| "Juju" | Pebbles | Phenomenal | 2011 | | Co-produced | | |
| "Over" | Pebbles | Phenomenal | 2011 | | Produced | | |
| "Phenomenal" | Pebbles | Phenomenal | 2011 | | Co-produced | | |
| "This Is My Journey" | Kelly Khumalo | The Past, The Present, The Future | 2012 | Co-writer | ✔ | | |
| "I Live For love" | Kelly Khumalo | The Past, The Present, The Future | 2012 | Co-writer | ✔ | | |
| "Give It To Me Baby" | Kelly Khumalo | The Past, The Present, The Future | 2012 | Co-writer | ✔ | | |
| "Imbali" | Kelly Khumalo | The Past, The Present, The Future | 2012 | Co-writer | ✔ | | |
| "Rise" | Kelly Khumalo | The Past, The Present, The Future | 2012 | | ✔ | | |
| "I Really Love You" | Kelly Khumalo | The Past, The Present, The Future | 2012 | Co-writer | ✔ | | |
| "Together Apart" | Kelly Khumalo | The Past, The Present, The Future | 2012 | | ✔ | ✔ | |
| "I Keep Fighting" | Kelly Khumalo | The Past, The Present, The Future | 2012 | | ✔ | | |
| "Little Girl" | Kelly Khumalo | The Past, The Present, The Future | 2012 | | ✔ | | |
| "If It Ain't For Love" | DJ Kuchi | | 2012 | Co-writer | | ✔ | |
| "You Belong" | SABC 2 theme song | | 2013 | Co-writer | ✔ | | |
| "Stripped Down Season 1 Jingle" | | | | | Produced | | |
| "Happy To Love" | Wanda Baloyi | Love & Life | 2014 | ✔ | ✔ | | |
| "Let Me Love You" | Vincent Bones | Idols Sa Winners' Single | 2014 | | ✔ | | |
| "Ups & Downs" | Proverb | The Read Tape | 2014 | | | ✔ | |
| "When Is It Love" | Vincent Bones | Shaded Soul | 2015 | ✔ | ✔ | | |
| "Love" | Eliezer | Single release | 2015 | | Vocal-Production | | |
| "Move On" | Melo | Single release | 2015 | Co-writer | ✔ | | |
| "Gonna Be Alright" | Fortune | Abomrapper | 2015 | | | ✔ | |

== Filmography ==
=== Television ===
| Year | Title | Role | Season's |
|---|---|---|---|
| 2004 | Project Fame | Vocal coach | |
| | Clash Of The Choirs South Africa | Musical director | 1-2 |
| | Idols South Africa | Musical director | 9 |
| | Idols South Africa | In-House Mentor | 10-12 |
| | The Voice South Africa | Vocal Coach | 1 |
| | The Voice Nigeria | Musical director | 1 |

== Awards and nominations ==
| Year | Award | Category | Results | Ref. |
|---|---|---|---|---|
| 2008 | Metro FM Awards | Best RnB Album | Won | |
| 2009 | Channel O Awards | Best Dance Video | Nominated | |
| 2009 | SAMA | Song of the Year | Nominated | |
| 2009 | SAMA | Remix of the year | Nominated | |
