= Bad Boys of the Arctic =

Studio album by Gary Lucas
- Released: September 20, 1994
- Genre: Art rock
- Length: 44:38
- Label: Enemy
- Producer: Gary Lucas, Murray Weinstock

Gary Lucas chronology
Gods and Monsters (1992)	Bad Boys of the Arctic (1994)	Pražská Strašidla (The Ghosts of Prague) (1996)

Professional ratings
Review scores
Source	Rating
The Encyclopedia of Popular Music	3/5 stars

Bad Boys of the Arctic is an album by Gary Lucas. It was released on September 20, 1994, through Enemy Records.

== Track listing ==
All tracks are written by Gary Lucas, except "Children's March: Over the Hills and Far Away" by Percy Grainger and "Let's Go Swimming" by Arthur Russell.

No.	Title	Length
1.	"After Strange Gods"	3:30
2.	"Poison I.V. League"	3:25
3.	"Jericho"	2:51
4.	"Children's March – Over the Hills and Far Away"	3:46
5.	"Exit, Pursued by a Bear"	3:43
6.	"I Want to Play Your Guitar"	2:49
7.	"They Can't Believe He's Risen Again"	2:46
8.	"Out from Under"	3:29
9.	"Let's Go Swimming"	6:59
10.	"The Nightmare of History"	1:43
11.	"Vampire Circus"	5:07
12.	"Cantina"	4:30

== Personnel ==
Musicians

- Jean Chaine – bass guitar
- Jonathan Kane – drums
- Gary Lucas – vocals, guitar, sampler, production

Production and additional personnel

- Jon Altschiller – engineering
- Gregg Bendian – percussion on "After Strange Gods" and "Exit, Pursued by a Bear"
- Ernie Brooks – bass guitar on "After Strange Gods" and "Exit, Pursued by a Bear"
- Jason Candler – engineering
- Greg Cohen – acoustic bass guitar on "Jericho"
- Sonya Cohen – spoken word on "Jericho", "I Want to Play Your Guitar" and "Out from Under"
- Anthony Coleman – piano on "Exit, Pursued by a Bear"
- Dina Emerson – spoken word on "After Strange Gods" and "Exit, Pursued by a Bear"
- Anthony Kane – Jew's harp on "After Strange Gods"
- Kumiko Kimoto – spoken word on "The Nightmare of History"
- Eric Kory – cello on "I Want to Play Your Guitar"
- Kenny & Larry – spoken word on "Poison I.V. League"
- A. Leroy – spinet on "Jericho"
- Fredrick Lonberg-Holm – cello on "Jericho"
- Sammy Merendino – sampler, drums
- Jared Michael Nickerson – bass guitar on "I Want to Play Your Guitar"
- Manfred Rahs – photography
- Bill Ruyle – hammered dulcimer on "Jericho"
- Tony Thunder Smith – drums on "I Want to Play Your Guitar"
- Chuck Valle – engineering
- Murray Weinstock – production, engineering
- Brad Worrell – engineering
