= Grace (Jeff Buckley song) =

Single by Jeff Buckley

from the album Grace
- Released: August 1994
- Recorded: 1993
- Studio: Bearsville (Woodstock, New York)
- Genre: Alternative rock; psychedelic rock; art rock; Celtic rock
- Length: 5:22 (album version); 4:57 (single edit)
- Label: Columbia
- Songwriters: Jeff Buckley; Gary Lucas
- Producer: Andy Wallace

Jeff Buckley singles chronology
"Grace" (1994)	"Last Goodbye" (1994)

Official video
- "Grace" on YouTube

"Grace" is a song by Jeff Buckley, released as the first single from his debut album, Grace (1994). The song was based on an instrumental song called "Rise Up to Be" written by Buckley's collaborator, Gary Lucas. Jeff wrote lyrics inspired by his saying goodbye to his girlfriend at the airport on a rainy day, and the vocal melody came naturally. In Buckley's words, "It's about not feeling so bad about your own mortality when you have true love."

In a MuchMusic interview in 1994, Buckley said, "the song itself is about...it's an elegy; to no one, about...I always describe it as not fearing anything, anyone, any man, any woman, any war, any gun, any sling or arrow aimed at your heart by other people because there is somebody, finally, who loves you for real, and that you can achieve a real state of grace through somebody else's love in you." He added, "everybody knows what it's like to create an artistic moment; so-called artistic moment, because it's really just heightened humanism; just a heightened human language. If you've spent a night making love, you know exactly what it means to strip your ego, down, where you are there, expressing yourself, wordlessly, collaborating on a moment that has an energy about it that is replenishing or even completely inspirational in a way that you could never imagine. That's the way art really is." Later in the interview, Buckley concluded by saying, "grace is what matters, in anything, especially life, especially growth, tragedy, pain, love, death; about people, that's what matters. That is a feature that I strongly respect. It prevents you from pulling the trigger too soon. It keeps you from destroying things too foolishly. It sort of keeps you alive; and it keeps you open for more understanding."

Buckley invited Lucas to play on the album, along with "Mojo Pin"; two songs that Lucas had created the main riffs for, and Buckley had expanded upon, making up the "Grace" heard on the album, and earlier on Songs to No One 1991–1992; these songs were prominent in gigs around 1991 onwards. In 2021, it was listed at No. 394 on Rolling Stone's "Top 500 Greatest Songs of All Time".

== Personnel ==
Credits adapted from Grace's single and album CD booklet.

- Jeff Buckley – vocals, guitars
- Gary Lucas – guitars (credited as "Magicalguitarness")
- Mick Grøndahl – bass
- Matt Johnson – drums, percussion
- Karl Berger – string arrangements

== Use in exams ==
In 2008, the British exam board Edexcel added "Grace" to their GCSE Music syllabus, and until 2017 it was used as one of the 12 set works covered in the course.

== Charts ==
Chart (1996)	Peak position
Australia (ARIA)	91

== Certifications ==
Region	Certification	Certified units/sales
United Kingdom (BPI)	Silver	200,000^{‡}
^{‡} Sales+streaming figures based on certification alone.
