= Pražská Strašidla (The Ghosts of Prague) =

Studio album by Urfaust & Gary Lucas
- Released: 1996
- Recorded: June–July 1996
- Genre: Art rock
- Length: 46:01
- Label: Studio Faust Records
- Producer: Richard Mader

Gary Lucas chronology
| Bad Boys of the Arctic (1994) | Pražská Strašidla (The Ghosts of Prague) (1996) | Evangeline (1996) |

Pražská Strašidla (The Ghosts of Prague) is a collaborative album by Gary Lucas and Urfaust (aka Richard Mader) founder and head of Studio Faust Records. The album was released on the label in 1996.

== Track listing ==
All tracks are written by Gary Lucas and Richard Mader.

| No. | Title | Length |
|---|---|---|
| 1. | "Intro" | 0:20 |
| 2. | "Děvka a Mnich z Celetné Ulice" (Whore and Monk from Celetna Street) | 3:19 |
| 3. | "Ohnivý Muž z Mokré Čtvrti" (Fiery Man Drunkard) | 4:27 |
| 4. | "O Tanečnici z Ozerova" (Dancer from Ozerov) | 3:13 |
| 5. | "Zakletí Mniši z Emauz" (Spellbound Monks of Emauzy) | 4:54 |
| 6. | "Kuplířka z Karmelitské Ulice" (Procuress from Karmelitska Street) | 3:55 |
| 7. | "Dvojníci z Nového Města" (Doubles from Nové Mesto) | 6:36 |
| 8. | "Vodníkova Nevěsta ze Zlaté Ulice" (Waterman's Bride from Zlata Street) | 4:02 |
| 9. | "Petřínský Oheň" (Fire on Petrin) | 9:28 |

== Personnel ==
- Jan Čambal – oboe and percussion on "Zakletí Mniši z Emauz" and "Petřínský Oheň"
- Dominika – vocals on "Dvojníci z Nového Města" and "Vodníkova Nevěsta ze Zlaté Ulice"
- Ivan Dvořák – drums on "O Tanečnici z Ozerova", "Zakletí Mniši z Emauz" and "Dvojníci z Nového Města"
- Pat Fulgoni – vocals, trumpet on "Zakletí Mniši z Emauz"
- Helena – vocals on "Dvojníci z Nového Města"
- Mirka Křivánková – vocals on "Petřínský Oheň"
- Gary Lucas – guitar, vocals on "Ohnivý Muž z Mokré Čtvrti", resonator guitar on "O Tanečnici z Ozerova"
- Richard Mader – guitar, synthesizer, production
- Pavel Ryba – bass guitar
- P. Simon – saxophone on "Ohnivý Muž z Mokré Čtvrti" and "O Tanečnici z Ozerova"
- Chris Sykes – drums on "Děvka a Mnich z Celetné Ulice"
