= Evangeline (Gary Lucas album) =

Studio album by Gary Lucas
- Released: 1996
- Genre: Folk
- Length: 48:31
- Label: Zensor
- Producer: Gary Lucas

Gary Lucas chronology
| Pražská Strašidla (The Ghosts of Prague) (1996) | Evangeline (1996) | Busy Being Born (1998) |

Professional ratings
Review scores
| Source | Rating |
|---|---|
| Allmusic | 4/5 stars |

Evangeline is the third album by Gary Lucas, released in 1996 through Zensor.

== Track listing ==
All tracks are written by Gary Lucas, except where noted.

| No. | Title | Writer(s) | Length |
|---|---|---|---|
| 1. | "The Animal Flesh Comes Creeping Back" | | 2:17 |
| 2. | "Evangeline" | | 3:04 |
| 3. | "Wedding March" | Richard Wagner | 2:01 |
| 4. | "The Wall" | San Min | 2:30 |
| 5. | "Apismatisin'" | | 3:48 |
| 6. | "Overture to Tannhäuser" | Richard Wagner | 3:30 |
| 7. | "Sail Up" | | 2:08 |
| 8. | "Ah Feel Like Ah Syd" | | 2:08 |
| 9. | "The Songstress on the Edge of Heaven" | He Luting | 2:35 |
| 10. | "A Wandering Minstrel Eye" | | 4:37 |
| 11. | "Police Dog Blues" | | 3:33 |
| 12. | "The Animal Flesh (Slight Return)" | | 2:45 |
| 13. | "Police Dog Blues" | Blind Blake | 5:46 |
| 14. | "Interstellar Low Ways" | Sun Ra | 4:33 |
| 15. | "Cool Hand Luke" | Lalo Schifrin | 2:58 |

== Personnel ==
- André Grossmann – photography
- Rick Hendrick – photography
- Robert Jacobson – recording
- Tim Kalliches – recording
- Gary Lucas – acoustic guitar, production, recording
- James McLean – recording
- Fred Reid – recording
- Joe Saba – recording
- Stewart Winter – recording
