= @ Paradiso =

EP by Gary Lucas
- Released: February 23, 1999
- Recorded: Paradiso, Amsterdam, Netherlands
- Genre: Folk
- Length: 22:14
- Label: Oxygen
- Producer: Gary Lucas

Gary Lucas chronology
Busy Being Born (1998)	@ Paradiso (1999)	Street of Lost Brothers (2000)

Professional ratings
Review scores
Source	Rating
Allmusic	3/5 stars
Alternative Press	3/5 stars

@ Paradiso is a live EP by Gary Lucas, released on February 23, 1999, through Oxygen Records.

== Track listing ==
No.	Title	Writer(s)	Length
1.	"Rise up to Be"	Gary Lucas	9:16
2.	"Bra Joe from Kilimanjaro"	Abdullah Ibrahim	6:39
3.	"Autobahn"	Ralf Hütter, Florian Schneider	3:23
4.	"The Songstress on the Edge of Heaven"	Gary Lucas	2:56

== Personnel ==
- Gary Lucas – guitar, production
