= The Fabulous Impressions =

Studio album by The Impressions
- Released: 1967
- Genre: Chicago soul
- Label: ABC Records
- Producer: Johnny Pate

The Impressions chronology
Ridin' High (1966)	The Fabulous Impressions (1967)	We're a Winner (1968)

Professional ratings
Review scores
Source	Rating
AllMusic	3/5 stars
The Encyclopedia of Popular Music	3/5 stars
The New Rolling Stone Record Guide	3/5 stars

The Fabulous Impressions is an album by the American soul music group the Impressions, released in 1967. It includes a cover of the Gene McDaniels song "One Hundred Pounds of Clay".

== Track listing ==
All tracks composed by Curtis Mayfield; except where indicated

1. "You Always Hurt Me" – 2:16
2. "It's All Over" – 3:11
3. "Little Girl" – 2:30
4. "One Hundred Pounds of Clay" (Luther Dixon, Bob Elgin, Kay Rogers) – 2:22
5. "Love's a Comin'" – 2:30
6. "You Ought to Be in Heaven" – 2:46
7. "I Can't Stay Away from You" – 2:46
8. "Aware of Love" (Jerry Butler, Mayfield) – 2:31
9. "Isle of the Sirens" – 3:02
10. "I'm Still Waitin'" – 3:00
11. "She Don't Love Me" – 2:43

== Personnel ==
The Impressions

- Curtis Mayfield - lead vocals, guitar
- Fred Cash - backing vocals
- Sam Gooden - backing vocals
- The Funk Brothers - instrumentation

== Charts ==
Year	Chart	Peak position
1967	Black Albums	16
1967	Pop Albums	184
