= Street of Lost Brothers =

Studio album by Gary Lucas
- Released: October 24, 2000
- Recorded: LoHo Studios, National Taiwan University, Taipel and Sound Dimensions
- Genre: Folk
- Length: 48:21
- Label: Tzadik
- Producer: Gary Lucas

Gary Lucas chronology
@ Paradiso (1999)	Street of Lost Brothers (2000)	Level the Playing Field: Early HurlyBurly 1988–1994 (2000)

Professional ratings
Review scores
Source	Rating
AllMusic	3/5 stars
DownBeat	3.5/5 stars
The Encyclopedia of Popular Music	3/5 stars

Street of Lost Brothers is an album by Gary Lucas. It was released on October 24, 2000, through Tzadik Records.

== Track listing ==
All tracks are written by Gary Lucas, except where noted.

No.	Title	Writer(s)	Length
1.	"Yigdal"	Traditional arr.	1:30
2.	"The Opener of the Way"		2:13
3.	"That's My Life"		4:22
4.	"Mahzel (Means Good Luck)"		2:35
5.	"It's Like a Wheel"		4:47
6.	"European Son"	John Cale, Sterling Morrison, Lou Reed, Maureen Tucker	3:10
7.	"I Kill You for Nothing"		2:48
8.	"Ride of the Valkyries"	Richard Wagner	4:00
9.	"Let My People Go"	Traditional arr.	3:34
10.	"Level the Playing Field"		2:59
11.	"Sh'ma"	Traditional arr.	10:58
12.	"The Tel Aviv Ghetto Fighter's Song"		3:54

== Personnel ==
Musicians

- Ernie Brooks – bass guitar
- Jason Candler – bass guitar, engineering
- Peter Eng – bass guitar
- Larry Fine – vocals
- Hank Frisch – harmonica
- Jesper Gadeliu – guitar
- Walter Horn – piano, sampler, synthesizer
- Kenny Hurwitz – vocals
- Jonathan Kane – drums
- Kenny – vocals
- Gary Lucas – vocals, acoustic guitar, electric guitar, slide guitar, steel guitar, production, engineering
- Aldo Tsang – drums
- John Zorn – alto saxophone

Production and additional personnel

- Heung-Heung "Chippy" Chin – design
- Hendrik Leitmann – photography
- Rob McCabe – engineering
- Andreas Neumann-Nochten – illustrations
- Tim Powell – engineering
- Allan Tucker – mastering
- Arjen Veldt – photography
