= I'm Still Waiting (Curtis Mayfield song) =

"I'm Still Waiting" is a Curtis Mayfield composition notable for its recording by post-doo-wop era Patti LaBelle and the Bluebelles. Mayfield also recorded his version of it with The Impressions. The song was intended for Patti LaBelle and her bandmates to record by Mayfield.

The LaBelle version reached number thirty-six on the Hot R&B Singles chart in 1966 and was featured on their second Atlantic release, Dreamer. The Impressions' version was recorded for their 1967 album, The Fabulous Impressions.

== Credits ==
=== Curtis Mayfield and the Impressions version ===
- Lead vocals and guitar by Curtis Mayfield
- Background vocals by Fred Cash and Sam Gooden
- Instrumentation by The Wrecking Crew

=== Patti LaBelle and the Bluebelles version ===
- Lead vocals by Patti LaBelle
- Background vocals by the Bluebelles: Nona Hendryx, Sarah Dash and Cindy Birdsong
- Instrumentation by The Funk Brothers
