= Busy Being Born =

Studio album by Gary Lucas
- Released: March 17, 1998
- Genre: Folk
- Length: 49:07
- Label: Tzadik
- Producer: Gary Lucas, Kazunori Sugiyama

Gary Lucas chronology
Evangeline (1997)	Busy Being Born (1998)	@ Paradiso (1999)

Professional ratings
Review scores
Source	Rating
AllMusic	4.5/5 stars
Entertainment Weekly	B

Busy Being Born is an album by Gary Lucas, released in 1998 through Tzadik Records. It is an album of children's songs.

== Production ==
"Fleischerei" is a tribute to the soundtracks to Max Fleischer cartoons.

== Track listing ==
All tracks are written by Gary Lucas, except where noted.

No.	Title	Writer(s)	Length
1.	"Adon Olom" (Instrumental)	Traditional arr.	1:30
2.	"Adon Olom" (Vocal)	Traditional arr.	3:11
3.	"Shekhinah"		2:19
4.	"Sandman"		4:27
5.	"Sunrise Sunset"	Jerry Bock, Sheldon Harnick	2:53
6.	"Tradition"	Jerry Bock, Sheldon Harnick	2:35
7.	"The Mensch in the Moon"	Walter Horn, Gary Lucas	5:07
8.	"Lydia, The Tattooed Lady"	Harold Arlen, Yip Harburg	2:06
9.	"Crawlspace"		3:08
10.	"Dayenu/Dreidel"	Traditional arr.	2:56
11.	"Fleischerei"	Green, Lerner, Timberg	3:01
12.	"A Hundred Pounds of Clay"	Luther Dixon, Bob Elgin, Kay Rogers	2:41
13.	"The Seven Faces of Dr. Lao"	Leigh Harline	2:06
14.	"Abie the Fishman"		2:28
15.	"Hinay Ma Tov"	Traditional arr.	2:53
16.	"Theme from Exodus"	Ernest Gold	2:50
17.	"Adon Olom" (Acappella)	Traditional arr.	2:56

== Personnel ==
Musicians

- Greg Cohen – bass guitar
- Jonathan Kane – drums
- Gary Lucas – vocals, acoustic guitar, electric guitar, steel guitar, production

Production and additional personnel

- Larry Fine – vocals on "Adon Olom", "The Mensch in the Moon" and "A Hundred Pounds of Clay"
- André Grossmann – photography
- Kenny Hurwitz – vocals on "Adon Olom", "The Mensch in the Moon" and "A Hundred Pounds of Clay"
- Tim Kalliches – engineering
- Misako Kano – piano on "Abie the Fishman"
- Ikue Mori – design
- Sascha von Oertzen – engineering
- Kazunori Sugiyama – production
- Irene Trudel – engineering
- Allan Tucker – mastering
- John Zorn – saxophone on "Adon Olom" and "Sandman"
