= Skeleton at the Feast =

Live album by Gary Lucas
- Released: 1991
- Recorded: 1989–1990 at the Netherlands and New York
- Genre: Psychedelic rock, blues rock
- Length: 45:43
- Label: Enemy
- Producer: Gary Lucas

Gary Lucas chronology
Skeleton at the Feast (1991)	Gods and Monsters (1992)

Professional ratings
Review scores
Source	Rating
AllMusic	4.5/5 stars

Skeleton at the Feast is the debut live album by American musician Gary Lucas, released in 1991 through Enemy Records.

== Track listing ==
No.	Title	Writer(s)	Length
1.	"Strong Seed"	Gary Lucas	6:14
2.	"Guerillas in the Midst"	Frank Zappa, Gary Lucas	5:42
3.	"Robert's Johnson"	Gary Lucas	2:14
4.	"Hard Werken Fucked over a Man/The Reckoning"	Gary Lucas	4:25
5.	"Hugh's Graveyard Stomp"	Gary Lucas	2:10
6.	"Hitchcocked including Vertigo and Psycho"	Bernard Herrmann	4:10
7.	"Tompkins Square Dance"	Gary Lucas	2:22
8.	"Christmas in Space Medley: Bells/Little Drummer Boyee/Are You Experienced?"	Jimi Hendrix, Gary Lucas	7:30
9.	"Aguirre/The Sheep Look Up"	Florian Fricke, Gary Lucas	5:34
10.	"Scud Patrol/Flux et Veritas"	Gary Lucas	4:03
11.	"Syd's Dream"	Gary Lucas	1:19
12.	"Music for the Golem: Rabbi Loew Consults the Stars/The Decree"	Walter Horn, Gary Lucas	6:10
13.	"Music for the Golem: The Junker and the Jewess"	Walter Horn, Gary Lucas	5:03
14.	"Music for the Golem: Creation of the Clay Man/Astaroth"	Walter Horn, Gary Lucas	5:17
15.	"Music for the Golem: The Golem Walks with Famulus, Der Böse Juden-Jüngling"	Walter Horn, Gary Lucas	1:41
16.	"Music for the Golem: The Festival of the Roses"	Walter Horn, Gary Lucas	5:03
17.	"Music for the Golem: In the Synagogue/The Vision of the Patriarchs"	Walter Horn, Gary Lucas	2:55
18.	"Music for the Golem: Go Go Golem"	Walter Horn, Gary Lucas	2:55

== Personnel ==
- Greg Calbi – mastering
- Jon Fox – recording
- Carla Gahr – photography
- Walter Horn – keyboards on "Music for the Golem"
- Tim Kalliches – recording
- Gary Lucas – electric guitar, acoustic guitar, production, engineering, recording
- Jasper Nöe – recording
- Team Romamoto – design
- Marion Rosendahl – photography
- Jon Wells – recording
