= Gary Lucas =

American musician (born 1952)

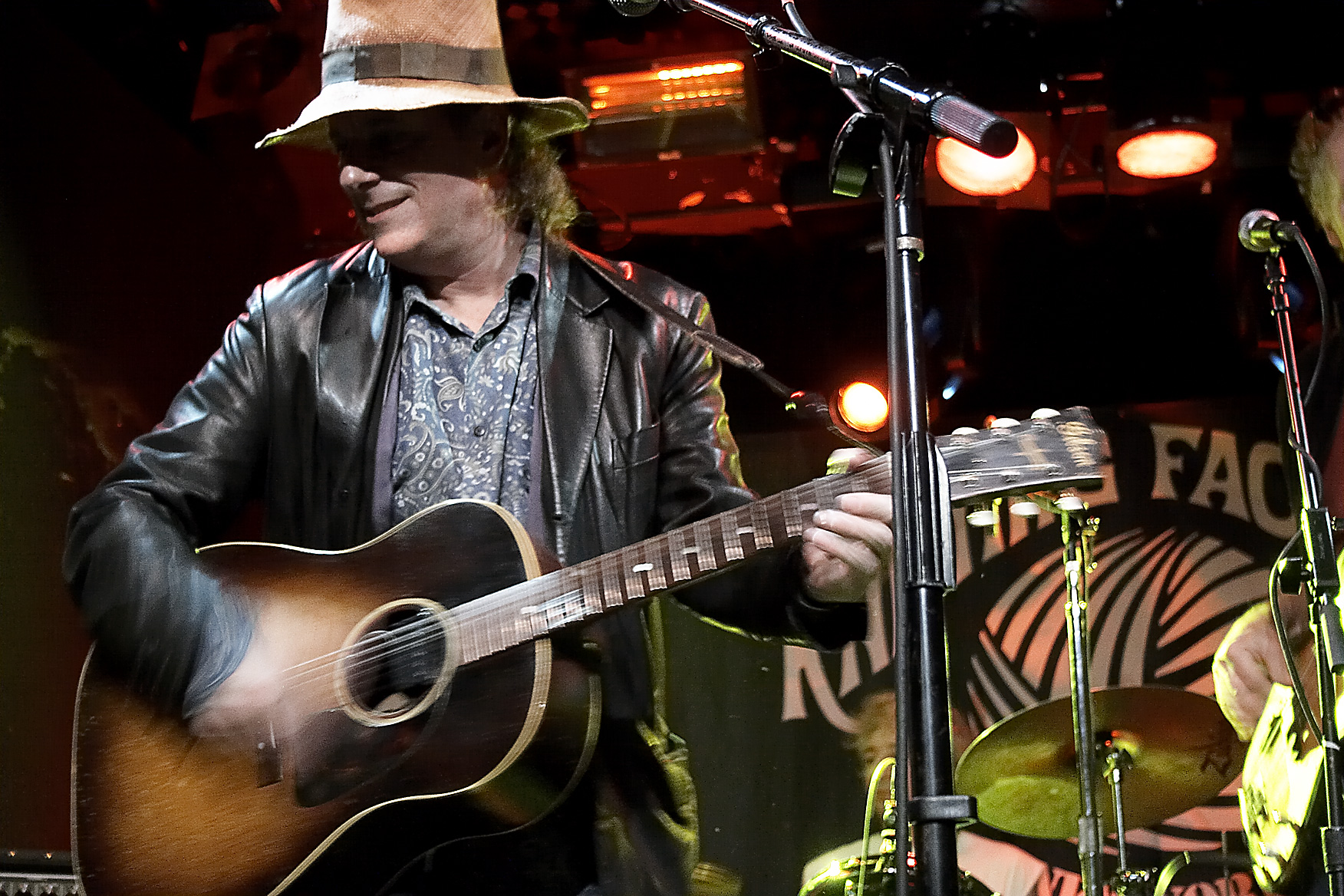
- Gary Lucas at the London Tribute to Jeff Buckley on September 9, 2017; Photo by Michael Ark

Background information
- Born: June 20, 1952 (age 73); Syracuse, New York, United States
- Genres: Rock, experimental rock, pop, blues
- Occupations: Musician, singer-songwriter, producer
- Instrument: Guitar
- Years active: 1970s–present
- Labels: Knitting Factory, Tzadik, Enemy, Northern Spy, Label Bleu
- Website: www.garylucas.com

Gary Lucas (born June 20, 1952) is an American guitarist, songwriter, and composer who was a member of Captain Beefheart's band. He formed the band Gods and Monsters in 1989.

Lucas has released more than 50 albums to date as a solo artist or band leader in a variety of genres, touring internationally.

Lucas has collaborated with Leonard Bernstein, Jeff Buckley, John Cale, Nick Cave, David Johansen, and Lou Reed. He has also worked with Chris Cornell, Najma Akhtar, DJ Spooky, Dr. John, Amanda Palmer, Bryan Ferry, The Future Sound of London, Allen Ginsberg, Peter Hammill, Warren Haynes, Dave Liebman, Joe Lovano, Kate & Anna McGarrigle, Geoff Muldaur, Bob Neuwirth, Mary Margaret O'Hara, Graham Parker, Van Dyke Parks, Iggy Pop, Yass Body, Roswell Rudd, Fred Schneider, Richard Barone, John Sebastian, Adrian Sherwood, Patti Smith, Peter Stampfel, Damo Suzuki, Steve Swallow, Bob Weir, John Zorn, Nona Hendryx, Emir Kusturica and the No Smoking Orchestra, Hal Willner, Kip Hanrahan, Elli Medeiros, Haydee Milanes, Suylen Milanes, Los Van Van, and Alabama Three.

In 2020, instead of doing live performances, which was not possible due to the COVID-19 pandemic, Lucas started a Pandemic Live Streaming every Tuesday, Thursday, and Saturday at 3pm EST on his Facebook page, which has gathered fans from all over the world.

== Early life ==
Lucas was born in Syracuse, New York.

According to his website, Lucas was encouraged by his father to try the guitar at the age of nine, while simultaneously studying the French horn, and played in jazz and rock groups during his teens in the 1960s.

He obtained a degree in English from Yale University (1974), before establishing his career in music first as a college DJ and then as music director at the college radio station, WYBC FM.

== Career ==
=== Captain Beefheart ===
During his last year in high school, Lucas played for the documentary film unit of the Upstate Medical Center and wrote the musical score on his first film assignment. In 1971, he traveled from New Haven to New York City to see his childhood hero Captain Beefheart (Don Van Vliet) make his New York concert debut, and later became close friends. From being a Beefheart fan, he eventually became his co-manager in 1980 with his then wife Ling Lucas, and occasionally performed on stage all over Europe and the U.S. during the 1980–81 tours with Beefheart's band, performing the difficult and complex solo guitar piece "Flavor Bud Living".

After gaining his degree, Lucas played for a few years with the O-Bay-Gone Band in Taipei, Taiwan while working for his father after college. He played with them for a few years before gaining a significant step in his career during 1980–82, when he was engaged to record on two Beefheart albums released by Virgin Records, on one of which he was full-time lead alongside Moris Tepper. Lucas performed over a period of five years with the last incarnation of Beefheart's Magic Band. He performed as a special guest—his first appearance on an album—on Beefheart's 1980 Doc at the Radar Station, which had put him on the musical map with critics and fans. He also read one of Van Vliet's poems (“One Man Sentence” or “Untitled”), and joined the Magic band on guitar (“Her Eyes Are a Blue Million Miles”) and bass (“Making Love to a Vampire with a Monkey on My Knee”). On 1982's Ice Cream for Crow, he was a full Magic Band member playing twin lead guitar alongside Tepper. In 1982 he became Van Vliet's sole manager as well as a full member of Beefheart's Magic Band.

After Captain Beefheart retired in the 1980s, Lucas continued to be associated with the Magic Band's former members. Several of Beefheart's former band members reformed the group, touring as the Magic Band from 2003 to 2006. Their 2007 double album and DVD, 21st Century Mirror Men, followed up their debut album Back to the Front, which was chosen as one of the best albums of 2004 by The Wire. In 1988, Lucas performed at New York's Knitting Factory. Shortly after, he was invited to appear at the 1988 JazzFest Berlin.

In 2006 Lucas co-led with saxophonist Philip Johnston an all-instrumental Beefheart tribute band, Fast 'n' Bulbous: the Captain Beefheart Project etc. Their debut album Pork Chop Blue Around the Rind was profiled on NPR and charted on college radio in the United States. In Fall 2006, they toured Europe extensively, selling out shows at the London Jazz Festival, in Amsterdam's Bimhuis, as well as playing in Bern, Switzerland; Vienna and Schwaz, Austria; and Ljubljana, Slovenia. The group released its second album, Waxed Oop, on Cuneiform Records in 2008, and performed at the Zappanale in Bad Doberan Germany in 2012.

2017 marked the 50th anniversary of the release of Beefheart's album Safe as Milk, and saw Lucas engaged in numerous projects to mark the occasion. This included feature coverage in MOJO magazine that coincided with the Captain Beefheart Weekend in Liverpool, England, where Lucas served on a panel at the participating Bluecoat Gallery. In collaboration with Dutch DJ/producer Co de Cloet, the final interview given by Don Van Vliet was set to music composed by Lucas. Titled "I Have a Cat," it was commissioned by Dutch national radio NPS where it was first broadcast in 1993. Later the project was released digitally by OkayMusic, and the pair performed the work live at the Zappanale in Germany as well as at the BimHuis in Amsterdam.

On February 17, 2013, Lucas led the 65-piece Metropole Orchestra in a symphonic tribute to Captain Beefheart at the Paradiso Amsterdam, produced by Co De Kloet. Titled "The World of Captain Beefheart", the concert featured Nona Hendryx (Labelle) as well as Jolene Grunberg, Tom Trapp and other Dutch singers.

In September 2017, the scaled-down five-piece Captain Beefheart tribute ensemble, The World of Captain Beefheart, led by Lucas and Nona Hendryx, performed an album teaser performance at the Public Theater. The self-titled album was released in November 2017 on Knitting Factory Records. January 22, 2018 saw a special multimedia performance of The World of Captain Beefheart at City Winery, New York.

=== Jeff Buckley/Gods and Monsters ===
In 1989, Lucas formed his band Gods and Monsters. He took the name from a line from the film Bride of Frankenstein: "To a new world of gods and monsters!" Originally an instrumental ensemble featuring two bass players, Lucas began writing songs and inviting singers to perform at an ad hoc basis in 1990. Lucas first met Jeff Buckley in New York at his father's, Tim Buckley’s, 1991 tribute concert, mounted by producer Hal Willner at St. Anne's Church in Brooklyn. Buckley stayed in New York and joined Gods and Monsters. Lucas composed solo guitar instrumentals for "Rise Up to Be" and "And You Will", which later became the musical templates for "Grace" and "Mojo Pin", which Lucas co-wrote with Buckley for his album, Grace. Early collaborations can also be heard on the Jeff Buckley and Gary Lucas album Songs to No One, which charted internationally with worldwide sales approaching 100,000. In the film Greetings from Tim Buckley (2013), Penn Badgely plays Buckley, and Tony Award winner Frank Wood plays Gary Lucas.

In May 2011, Lucas released a new studio album with Gods and Monsters, titled The Ordeal of Civility. Gods and Monsters celebrated their 25th anniversary in June 2014 with a special performance at (Le) Poisson Rouge.

Early in 2018, Lucas performed a special concert of the dozen songs he co-wrote with Jeff Buckley. He performed with Jolene Grunberg and other singers, was accompanied by the 65-piece Metropole Orchestra at the Paradiso Amsterdam, and the show was produced by Co de Kloet.

In the fall of 2019, Lucas released The Complete Jeff Buckley and Gary Lucas Songbook (Esordisco) with Italian singer The Niro (Davide Combusti). The album was recorded in Rome at the end of 2018 and featured new studio versions of all 12 songs co-written by Jeff Buckley and Gary Lucas including five never before officially released. By Christmas that year, the album was voted Best Album of 2019 by Classic Rock Magazine Italia.

Lucas has continued to operate Gods and Monsters on and off since 1989. Their last studio album was 2012's The Ordeal of Civility, which was produced by Jerry Harrison, who was also a group member for several years. The lineup also features Ernie Brooks (The Modern Lovers) on bass, Billy Ficca (Television) on drums, and Jason Candler (Hungry March Band) on saxophone. The full lineup has performed in St. Petersburg, Moscow, and Austin Texas.

=== The Edge of Heaven ===
Gary has a long history working with Chinese music, stemming back to two years working for the family business in Taipei Taiwan from 1975 to 1977. In 2001, an album titled The Edge of Heaven: Gary Lucas Plays Mid-Century Chinese Pop, was released on the French government sponsored Label Bleu to wide acclaim and received rave reviews in Rolling Stone, WSJ, Chinese newspapers, and on NPR, and reached number one on the World Chart. This album is a tribute to Shanghai pop music of the '30s and '40s. Lucas has performed live versions of this material all over the world, including well received concerts in Shanghai during the 2010 Expo Shanghai and also at the Holland Festival in Amsterdam.

In 2013, Lucas performed with his 1930s Chinese pop project, The Edge of Heaven, in a sold-out show at the Fishman Space at BAM with vocalists Sally Kwok and Mo Hai Jing and his group Gods and Monsters. The project was also performed as a trio featuring Lucas, Sally Kwok, and Mo Hai Jing at the 1930 Club in Shanghai. October also saw Lucas performing in Federico García Lorca's La Casa de Bernarda Alba at the Gaia Arts Center in Havana.

Lucas began working on a follow-up to The Edge of Heaven with vocalist Feifei Yang and saxophonist Jason Candler in late 2017, including a version of Lucas and Buckley's "Grace." At the annual Moon Festival, at Lincoln Center's Alice Tully Hall, Lucas and Yang performed with the 70-piece Asian Cultural Orchestra, including the debut of their duet of "The Moon Represents My Heart." In celebration of the Chinese New Year in February 2018, the new Edge of Heaven trio performed at the Laurie Beechman Theatre. Yang and Lucas also served as judges on CCTV's Super Baby talent competition and a documentary about their collaborations is forthcoming on SinoVision.

=== Other collaborations ===
In the mid-1990s Lucas performed with Richard Barone in series of duo shows and live radio broadcasts in which Barone played Mellotron. Barone also guested on lead vocals with Lucas in Gods and Monsters and appears on subsequent albums.

In 2003–2004 Lucas collaborated with Dutch lutist Jozef van Wissem on the Universe of Absence and Diplopia. They have performed live on Dutch national TV together.

In 2007, Lucas collaborated on an album with electronic producer James R Hunter's project The Dark Poets, produced by British label manager Stevo Pearce of Some Bizzare Records. The album, Gary Lucas vs the Dark Poets – Beyond the Pale, features an eclectic mixture of moody drum and bass, techno and rock tracks (notably "Prime Time", featuring vocals by Sarah Hilliard and James R. Hunter) as well as many early Lucas tracks and collaborations (including "Procuress from Karmelitska Street" featuring vocalist Pat Fulgoni of Kava Kava and original sketches of songs that went on to be used on Jeff Buckley's Grace album, including "Grace" and "Mojo Pin").

In 2009, Lucas collaborated on a world music collaboration with Indian vocalist Najma Akhtar. Their album RISHTE combines rock, blues, folk, and raga, on Harmonia Mundi/World Village. It was number 4 in the European World Music charts in 2009.

In 2009, he collaborated with Juan Galeano on his album El Peregrino, which debuted April 2010.

In 2010, Lucas collaborated with vocalist Dean Bowman on their "spiritual roots project" and gospel album, "Chase The Devil". The duo performed an amalgam of Hebrew and African-American blues live in the United States and Europe.

In 2013 Lucas performed in several special collaborations in late 2013, including with Mother Falcon and Amanda Palmer, with Richard Mader and Pat Fulgoni as the Ghosts of Prague at Jazz Dock, and with Toni Deszo, deBORT's lead saxophonist, at the Budapest Jazz Club.

In 2014, Lucas released an album called Otherworld on Esoteric Antenna. Other World is a collaborative effort with Peter Hammill of Van der Graaf Generator.

In 2014 Fleischerei: Music From Max Fleischer Cartoons, a collaboration between Lucas, Sarah Stiles, and Joe Fiedler, is a musical tribute to Max Fleischer and the jazz and swing scores that accompanied his animated work. Their public debut came at the Brooklyn Academy of Music Cafe in November 2014. The project features Stiles as Betty Boop. An album of the songs was released on February 5, 2015, on Cuneiform Records. The album was cited as one of the best albums of 2016 in DownBeat magazine.

Lucas has collaborated intermittently with DJ Cosmo (Colleen Murphy) as Wild Rumpus. Having worked together in the Manhattan rave scene, their work focuses on incorporating Lucas's guitar work into electronic dance music. In 2014 the duo released the double-vinyl album Musical Blaze-up on Bitches Brew. Curious Animal gave the LP a seven out of ten, saying "the international sound is the album's ... big defining feature". I House U called Musical Blaze-Up a "rawkus musical mash-up" and the video for lead single "Rock the Joint" was named BBC 6 Music Video of the Week.

In 2015 Lucas's psychedelic world music trio, Pearly Clouds, released their debut album on Discovery Records on March 15, 2015. The project features Hungarian traditional folk vocalist Enikő Szabó and Serbian saxophonist Toni Dezso.

Lucas traveled to England in February 2017 to produce a new album from Ed Laurie. Lucas's celebrated album Rishte with Najma Akhtar was reissued on OkayMusic, rising to #4 on the World Music Charts Europe. Fall 2017 saw the release of the album Gary and Toni Go Nutz!, a duo of Lucas and Toni Dezso of Pearly Clouds, on Rare Lumiere and Okay Records. Rokus Kalapis created an animated feature to accompany the album.

In 2018, he opened director Emir Kusturica's long-running Kustendorf Film and Music Festival in Serbia with two live film scores, including the formerly lost Russian fantasy short Bound By Film starring Vladimir Mayakovsky and Rene Clair's surrealisticEntr'acte; and with Emir Kusturica's Balkan gypsy ensemble The No Smoking Orchestra. Gary returned again to Serbia in July to perform at Kusturica's Bolshoi Classical Music Festival with a third live film score for the famed Russian silent comedy Chess Fever.

His next album, The Essential Gary Lucas (Knitting Factory Records), a 36-track, two-CD anthology was released in January, 2021, spanned 40 years of Lucas's music. Broadway World wrote that the album, "offers ample evidence of this maverick artist's trailblazing and unique career.... a truly epic body of work that spans psychedelic rock, film music, classical, electronica, jazz, blues, avant-garde, and world music excursions through 1930s Chinese pop, Hungarian folk, raga, and more, all unified by Lucas's virtuosic guitar and ceaselessly questing spirit."

In late October 2020, Lucas was invited with the authorization of the Dutch government to play the So What's Next? Festival in Eindhoven in the Netherlands with his live solo score accompanying the Spanish Dracula on Halloween, and a new duo project with Dutch acoustic bassist and singer Peter Willems. Lucas successfully overrode the travel ban on Americans during the COVID-19 pandemic to journey to the Netherlands, the first country in Europe to get behind his music in a big way, and his shows were live-streamed on social media from the Eindhoven Muziekgebouw. While there, he recorded a new album with Willems, scheduled for 2021 release.

=== Le Beast Concrète ===
On July 1, 2021, Lucas released a new electronica collaboration, Le Beast Concrète, with producer/DJ David Sisko. First was the digital single "Realize It", with accompanying psychedelic animated clip by 3XA. About their new single, La Ruta (Spain) wrote: "Always surprising and unfathomable, Gary Lucas presents a new single with producer and engineer David Sisko combining Gary's signature guitar riffs and lines with Sisko's deep 808 trap and relentless dancefloor beats with a result that reflects the guitar player's complexity mixing genres such as blues, rock, dance, trap and avant-garde". More positive reviews followed in UnCut magazine and elsewhere.

Lucas also published several articles at Please Kill Me.com during the pandemic, including an extensive piece about his relationship with Captain Beefheart and Frank Zappa, a memoir of working on a rap record with Vin Diesel and Arthur Russell, and an appreciation of the Bonzo Dog Band's Vivian Stanshall, the original Fleetwood Mac's leader Peter Green, and the Rolling Stones' Brian Jones.

On September 11, 2021, Lucas celebrated his 40th anniversary in music at Le Poisson Rouge in NYC with a 2-hour show featuring Ernie Brooks, Jerry Harrison, Thurston Moore and other special guests. On September 15, 2021, Rolling Stone magazine published their revised list of the 500 Greatest Songs of All Time which included Lucas and Jeff Buckley's "Grace", as featured on Buckley's two million selling 1994 album Grace.

Some of these collaborations appear on his retrospective 2000 album Improve the Shining Hour, which also features his film and TV music for ABC News, 20/20, and Turning Point. He has produced albums for composer/saxophonists Tim Berne and Peter Gordon, and for the French avant-rock band Tanger. He co-wrote Joan Osborne's Grammy-nominated song "Spider Web" from her triple platinum album Relish and co-wrote Jeff Buckley's anthems "Grace" and "Mojo Pin" from the Grace album, often cited as one of the Top 50 Albums of All Time.

On July 1, 2021, Gary unleashed his latest project Le Beast Concrete, a collaboration with producer/DJ David Sisko.

On November 7, 2021, Lucas released an acoustic duo project on the ZenneZ label featuring bassist and vocalist Peter Willems titled Double Dare Vol. One. Gary and Peter met via Gary's old friend producer Co de Kloet shortly before lockdown and began collaborating and recording in 2020. The duo made their official live debut before an audience with a sold-out concert in Maastricht's Lumiere Cinema, followed by an instore appearance in Hilversum, which was taped for a live broadcast on Co de Kloet's CoLive! program on national Dutch radio NTR. This was followed by a concert at the Parkstad Limburg Theatre in Heerlen.

He closed out the year of 2021 with a national Dutch radio retrospective of his work on Co Live! on NTR, and four overseas concerts—solo in Tuscany, solo, and with an all-star ensemble including percussionist Lukas Ligeti in Paris, solo and duo with Peter Willems in the Netherlands, and solo acoustic on December 15 in London at regal Winfield House in Regent's Park. This was a private concert by invitation of Acting US Ambassador to the UK Philip Reeker, similar to a private concert he had arranged for Gary when he was Consul General in Milan a few years ago, where he presented Gary with an Award for Cultural Diplomacy. The year ended with Rockdelux magazine in Spain, selecting The Essential Gary Lucas as one of the best compilations of the year.

In 2022, Lucas mounted a special Chinese New Year edition of The Edge of Heaven with Feifei Yang at Joe's Pub on February 1. The World of Captain Beefheart featuring Gary Lucas and Nona Hendryx was tapped to play Bang On a Can's new Long Play Festival in Brooklyn over the last weekend of April 2022.

== Solo tours ==
He has performed at the Venice Biennale, London's Royal Festival Hall, the New York Jewish Film Festival at Lincoln Center, as part of a weeklong artist-in-residency at the Quebec City Summer Festival, at the Alien artist H. R. Giger's Retrospective in Prague (home of the Golem), at Atlanta's Dragon Con 2002 (the largest science fiction festival in the world), and at the fifth annual Pop Montreal music and film festival.

Other concert appearances include a 2003 concert at the Czech Embassy in Washington, D.C., by invitation of the Czech ambassador spotlighting Lucas's solo guitar arrangements of Czech classical music in honor of the 14th anniversary of the Velvet Revolution.

During his fourth tour of Russia in 2005, Lucas performed his original solo guitar adaptation of the Lucas/Horn score accompanying the silent classic German horror film The Golem (1920) in Moscow and Saint Petersburg and appeared on national TV before an estimated 50 million viewers, as well as being feted in the Russian edition of Rolling Stone. He's played with The Golem solo globally since the live debut of the duet score he and keyboardist Walter Horn wrote for the movie in 1989 for the Brooklyn Academy of Music Next Wave Festival.

Gary Lucas's January 2012 solo tour of Europe began in Spain with a program on National Basque Radio Euskadi, and a performance of the "Spanish Dracula for Bilbao's Musiketan Festival" in Sala BBK. In England, Lucas conducted his Captain Beefheart Symposium two nights in a row at Liverpool's Philharmonic and record 8 tracks in a collaboration with Bryan Ferry at Olympia Studios. Two solo performances followed in Lisbon and Porto, Portugal, with guest performer Diana Silviera. The tour finished in Paris with a surprise performance at La Feline, and solo show at the New Morning with Cheyenne Schiavone, Beatrice Demi-Mondaine, Jean-Francis Pauvros, and Daniel Yvinec, reviewed favorably by E. Corvee in Politis.

Lucas returned to Europe for a debut solo in Sardinia at the Santa Arresi Jazz Festival, and a special concert at the Paradiso in Amsterdam on September 2, 2012, in a collaboration with the Metropole Orkest and Dutch singers entitled "The music of Jeff Buckley and Gary Lucas" and featuring Italian vocalist Alessio Franchini; this coincided with publication of his first book, Touched by Grace—La Mia Musica con Jeff Buckley. He then performed a week of shows in the Czech Republic, headlining Prague's Alternativa Festival solo, appearing live for three hours of interviews and performance on national Beat Radio, performing in Jablonec, Bohemia, with his "Monsters from the Id" music and film project. He also performed at Shakespeare and Company, the Paris bookstore.

Fleischerei was performed throughout 2016 at the Jewish Film Festival in Washington, D.C., the Porgy and Bess Jazz Club in Wien, the Boston Jewish Film Festival, the City Winery NYC and City Winery Chicago seders, as well as at the City Winery NYC klemzer brunch.

Lucas headlined the Pisa Internet Festival with a solo acoustic concert at Teatro Lumiere. He also performed with guest vocalist Danae Villanueva Blanco at the Gaia Arts Center Havana Cuba in May 2016. In December 2016, Lucas reunited with members of Plastic People of the Universe, DG 307, and Urfaust at the Blues Bahnof Prague.

On October 1, 2016, Lucas performed an acoustic solo concert to close the Jewish Museume of Vienna's exhibition "Stars of David."

For Holocaust Remembrance Day 2017, Lucas performed solo before the General Assembly of the United Nations.

A solo tour of Europe in 2017 also saw Lucas perform in Czech director Pavel Gobl's forthcoming The Supervision of the Interpretation of Dreams, as well as performances at the Varnsdorf State Theater and the Danish National Library. Lucas was honored to celebrate the 200th show at Pori, Finland's underground club Validi Karkia.

In May 2018, Lucas was featured in a two-part special on Co de Kloet's "Co Live" program on Dutch radio NPO, looking back over Gary's career. That same month, Lucas embarked on a 12-date solo tour of multi-media performances in the UK titled “An Evening with Gary Lucas: From Beefheart to Buckley and Beyond.

In 2020, he played a solo show at Joe's Pub at the Public Theater in Manhattan billed as "Gary Lucas and Frenz", which featured his Gods and Monsters band (Ernie Brooks, Billy Ficca, and Jason Candler) plus special guests vocalists Feifei Yang and Anna Podolak. In March, before the COVID-19 pandemic lockdown hit the United States, he played a sold-out performance with The Golem at Cornell University. In lieu of all of his live shows being postponed both domestically and internationally, Gary began doing thrice weekly solo concerts live streaming from his apartment on Facebook, which attracted a worldwide audience.

== Tribute performances ==
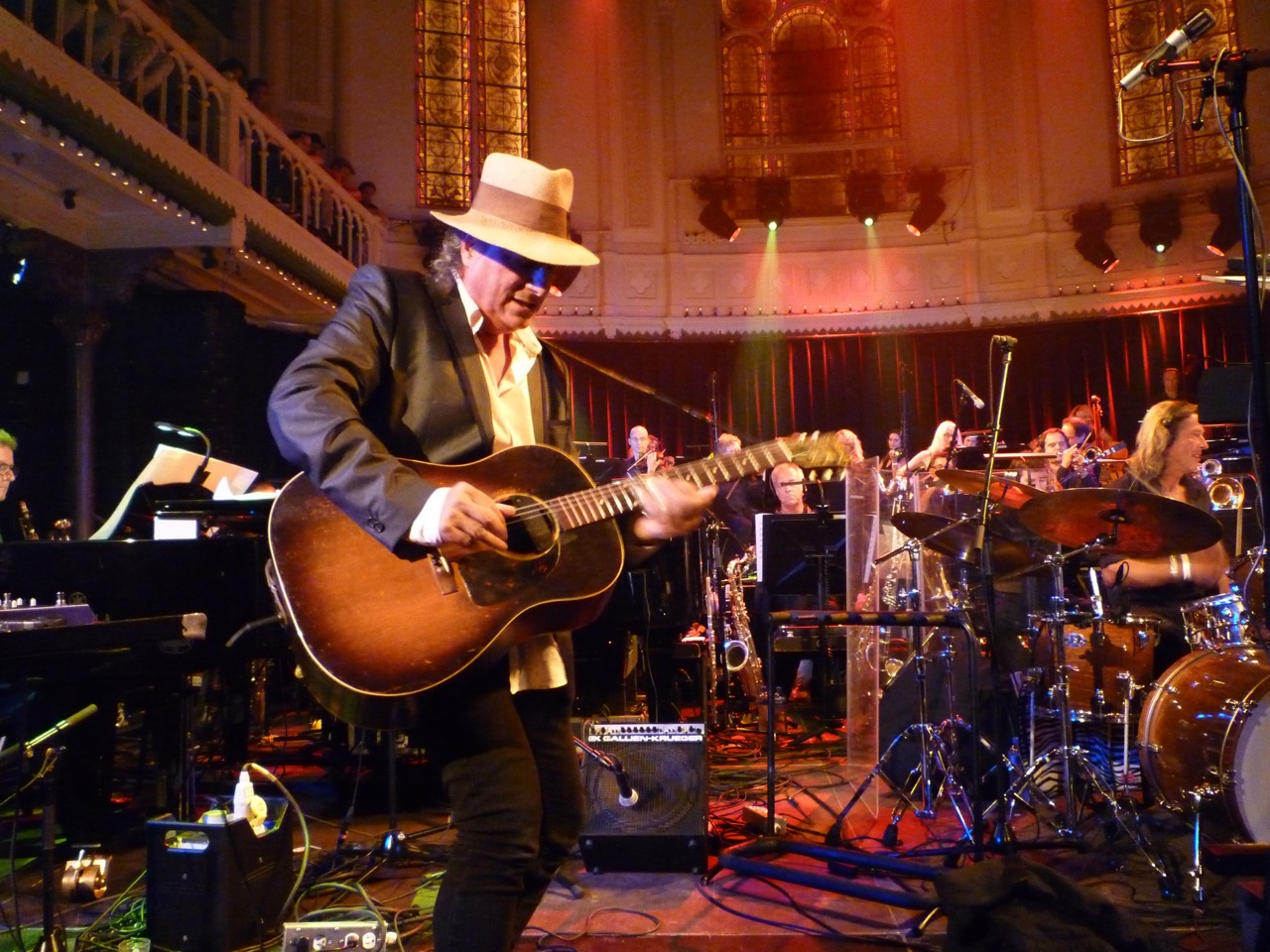
Gary Lucas performing "The Music of Jeff Buckley and Gary Lucas" with The Metropole Orchestra at Paradiso Amsterdam on September 2, 2012. Photo: Sjaniek Schaap

In 2013, Lucas returned to New York City to play with the Les Paul Trio and singer Jann Klose in NYC's Iridium Jazz Club, with high-profile solo appearances at (Le) Poisson Rouge and Joe's Pub with M'Lumbo as well as on their new release Popular Science, and headlining a tribute to avant-garde band The Shaggs at The Bell House in Brooklyn, where he performed with Gods and Monsters. The year wrapped with a trip to Havana—Lucas' fifth appearance there—where he performed three nights at the Gaia Arts Center in a tribute to Michelangelo Antonioni on the occasion of his 100th anniversary; performed live on national Radio Havana and Radio Taíno; and was interviewed and filmed performing live by national Austrian television ORF for a program.

Additional touring in 2013 included special performances focused on well-known collaborators Jeff Buckley and Captain Beefheart. Lucas performed a tribute concert to Buckley at the Barezzi Festival in Parma, Italy, with Vinicio Caposella and Alessio Franchini, where he was also presented with a Lifetime Achievement Award. Lucas performed with the Metropole Orkest at the Paradiso in Amsterdam as part of "The World of Captain Beefheart", a tribute to Captain Beefheart (Don Van Vliet), that also featured Nona Hendryx, Jolene Grunberg, and Tom Trapp.

Lucas returned to Italy in Summer 2015, performing across the country with Italian singer/songwriter Alessio Franchini, including as part of Franchini's Touch of Grace Tribute to Jeff Buckley at the Teatro della Luna in Milan, as well as an appearance at Italian singer-songwriter Vinicio Caposella's "Moon in June Festival" in Umbria.

In 2015 Lucas led Gods and Monsters as music director of A State of Grace, a multi-artist tribute to both Tim and Jeff Buckley. The tribute saw Gary perform with singer/songwriter Martha Wainwright, Steve Kilbey (of The Church (band)), and other vocalists over 6 nights in Sydney, Melbourne, Canberra and at the Brisbane Festival.

In July 2012, Lucas performed live before an estimated viewing audience of 70 million on CNBC in a segment devoted to Gibson Guitars; later that summer the national French ARTE Channel interviewed him for the documentary Rock Attitude. He was also interviewed and filmed performing live by National Austrian Television ORF for a program which aired in 2013.

At the Peace Hotel in November 2016, Lucas and collaborator Sally Kwok performed a tribute Chinese pop of the 1930s. Later that month, Lucas performed as part of the "Hendrix in Harlem" Tribute at the Apollo Theater, alongside Fishbone, Nona Hendryx, and Ernie Isley.

2017 saw Lucas pay tribute to Buckley over two nights at Recoletos Jazz Club in Madrid alongside Mercedes Ferrer and Miryam Latrece. In September, Lucas performed a sold-out tribute to Buckley in London with special guest Mari Conti.

In 2020, Lucas appeared at the Anthology Film Archives in New York City, performing a live solo score at a tribute to the recently departed founder and avatar of the experimental film Jonas Mekas, on a bill with special guests Jim Jarmusch, Ed Sanders (The Fugs), and Richard Barone.

On Sept. 11th, Gary mounted a 40th-anniversary show dating from his first-ever appearances onstage with Captain Beefheart in the fall of 1980 at Le Poisson Rouge in NYC. Lucas reassembled his longtime psychedelic band with Ernie Brooks bass (Modern Lovers), Jerry Harrison keyboards (Talking Heads), Jason Candler keyboards (Hungry March Band), and Richard Dworkin drums (World of Captain Beefheart). Special guests for the evening included former Gods and Monsters vocalists Emily Duff, Richard Barone, Felice Rosser, and Thurston Moore on guitar (Sonic Youth). The show got a major writeup in the Aquarian. Gary followed up with a Gods and Monsters 30th-anniversary show at Elsewhere in Brooklyn which featured special guest vocalists Feifei Yang and Angelica Zollo, and original Gods and Monsters members Richard Barone vocals (The Bongos) and Jared Nickerson bass (Burnt Sugar).

== Lectures ==
Lucas has given lectures widely on the mechanics of songwriting, extensive collaborations, composing for film, and the music business at the Amsterdam Music Conservatorum, Yale University (his alma mater), the University of Hawaii, New York University, and Columbia University. He has given guitar master classes since the late 1990s at such institutions as the Amsterdam Music Conservatory and in Honolulu at the University of Hawaii. He has also lectured at Rogers State University in Oklahoma, and McGill University in Montreal, Canada. In 2013, Lucas gave a TEDx talked titled "Blues and the Tuning of the World."

In Fall 2012, Lucas gave a masterclass and a concert in Paris with French guitarist David Konopnicki and his band at the Henri Dutilleux Music Conservatoire. In April 2014, Lucas gave a masterclass at Rutgers University Mason Gross School of the Arts, with students noting that "his guitar playing and compositions were unlike anything else I have heard before" and that "he has some great ideas about life and music." December 2016 saw Lucas giving a Guitar Masterclass alongside a seminar on songwriting at Conservatorium van Amsterdam. Lucas has also given masterclasses at the School of Jazz at the New School.

While touring Mexico in 2014, Lucas was invited by the United States Ambassador to Mexico Earl Anthony Wayne to perform a concert at the Benjamin Franklin Library in Mexico City as part of the ambassador's outreach program for disadvantaged youth. Following the performance, Lucas received an official letter of endorsement and appreciation from Ambassador Wayne. Lucas returned to perform again in December 2015 and November 2016, both at the invitation of the U.S. ambassador.

Lucas has continually conducted a popular symposium on his former mentor and collaborator, Captain Beefheart (Don Van Vliet), both in the U.S. and in Europe. The symposium focuses not only on Van Vliet's music, but also his work as a visual artist. Lucas discusses the history of Vliet's band, collaborations, personality, and techniques in addition to sharing archival footage and unreleased music. His two symposia in Liverpool in January 2012 were sold out. He presented at the Zappanale in Bad Doberan, Germany in August 2012, followed by a reunion of jazz-rock Beefheart tribute ensemble Fast 'N' Bulbous co-led by Phillip Johnston.

The symposium has been given at numerous venues, including the Knitting Factory in Brooklyn, the Independent in San Francisco, Echoplex in Los Angeles, and Casa Del Lago in Mexico City, and often features notable guests, which have previously included Matt Groening, Robert Williams, Terry Van Vliet, Francis McCarthy, Gary Marker, Kristine McKenna, Bill Moseley, and many others.

Lucas was named Artist in Residence at Royal Liverpool Philharmonic Hall in Liverpool England in December, 2015. During this residency, Lucas performed numerous solo works and presented his new Jeff Buckley Symposium.

== Media ==
Lucas was the subject of Klaus Totzler's documentary Gary Lucas in Havana, which aired on Austrian national television ORF and on 3SAT TV in May 2013.

In the last few years Lucas has been profiled in the International Herald Tribune, Libération, and featured on the cover of The Forward as well as the national Dutch newspaper Het Parool. According to the Beefheart website: "Since the end of the Magic Band, he has been very prolific in his own right, solo and within a band, releasing almost an album a year since 1991. His virtuoso solo live shows are awesome in the sounds he extracts from his guitar."

Lucas was a consultant for Greetings from Tim Buckley about Jeff Buckley's early days working in New York Cityu, directed by Dan Algrant and starring Penn Badgley ("Gossip Girl") as Jeff. Character of Gary Lucas played by Tony Award-winning actor Frank Wood. Lucas plays his own guitar parts for the film. The film was released worldwide in cinemas in 2013.

== Publications ==
2013 saw the publishing of Lucas's book Touched by Grace: My Time with Jeff Buckley published in English by Jawbone Press. In support of this, Lucas performed a string of shows in the United Kingdom, as well as two performances and signings at Shakespeare and Company in Paris.

Arcana Books (Italy) published Gary Lucas' book, Touched by Grace—La Mia Musica con Jeff Buckley, in September 2012. Publication was supported with several Italian in store appearances and concerts by Lucas, including Feltrinelli in Trieste, the Fnac Megastore in Milan, and the Madame Guitar Festival in Tricesimo (Lucas' third appearance there). Touched by Grace was published in English by Jawbone Press in October 2013. Mojo gave the book four stars. Roy Trakin of Hits (magazine) named the book among his top 10 of 2014.

In Italy, Gary was asked to write an article for Italian Rolling Stone entitled "La Via Mia in 10 Canzoni" (Gary Lucas: My Life in 10 Songs). On the occasion of Don Van Viet (Captain Beefheart)'s birthday on January 15, PleaseKillMe.com published a reminiscence by Gary of working with Don and the pair's close encounters with Frank Zappa. Gary also published several more pieces at Please Kill Me over the ensuing months, including a memory of working on a rap record with Vin Diesel and Arthur Russell and an appreciation of the Bonzo Dog Band's Vivian Stanshall, the original Fleetwood Mac's leader Peter Green, and the Rolling Stone's Brian Jones.

On September 15, 2021, Rolling Stone magazine published their list of the 500 Greatest Songs of All Time which included Gary Lucas and Jeff Buckley's anthem "Grace"—the title track of Jeff Buckley's two-million selling 1994 album.

Lucas has written extensively, working in poetry and fiction, as well as reflections on music and his own experiences.

== Reception ==
Lucas draws from the blues tradition and includes styles such as psychedelic rock, world music, and jazz, as well as classical works. The New York Times described his guitar playing: "Gary Lucas plays guitar the way Salvador Dalí painted, with dazzling displays of technique, wicked humor, and a thirst to completely refashion his art from its basic elements".

Lucas has been described as a "guitarist with a global guitar" (Larry Rohter, 9 May 2011, New York Times) "one of the best and most original guitarists in America" (David Fricke, 16 November 2006, Rolling Stone); a "legendary leftfield guitarist" (The Guardian, 24 December 2005); "the thinking man's guitar hero" (The New Yorker, 8 January 2007), "perhaps the greatest living electric guitar player" (Daniel Levitin) and one of "the most innovative and challenging guitarists playing today" (fRoots, March 2002). Lucas' style melds easily into rock and blues, has "avant-garde affinities", but is "not easily typecast" according to the Wall Street Journal.

February 2014 saw the release of Otherworld, an experimental collaboration between Lucas and Peter Hammill. The album was well received by critics, with MAX Magazine Italy writing, "Guitars, abstract landscapes, breathtaking texts (as always when a true poet as Hammill gathers in the field), spectral songs, layers, all conspire to create something unexpectedly powerful and disarming". Lucas and Hammill were featured on the covers of Guitar Player magazine and Rock Society magazine for the project, in addition to featured coverage in Prog magazine. Record Collector gave the album four stars (out of four), and Uncut marked it seven out of ten. In support of the collaboration, Lucas and Hammill performed together at the Gouveia Art Rock Festival in Portugal and at the Teatro de la Ciudad in Mexico City.

The Edge of Heaven, is an album of Lucas's lush arrangements of classic Chinese pop tunes from the 1930s, with a distinctly bluesy feel. It received positive international reviews from Rolling Stone to The Wall Street Journal to the Hong Kong Music Weekly. It was #1 on the World Music Charts in Canada and garnered international attention, England's Q magazine awarding it 4 stars, and Mojo writing: "It is simply gorgeous". The album was chosen as one of the best discs of the year in France's Libération newspaper. There was a lengthy profile for the album in The Wall Street Journal, as well as an NPR interview. Lucas released an expanded concert version of The Edge of Heaven with his band, Gods and Monsters, and vocalists Sally Kwok and Mo Hai Jin, both from Shanghai. The group received standing ovations at the Holland Festival in Amsterdam in June 2011.

2016 saw three new releases have a positive critical response. Fleischerei: Music from Max Fleischer Cartoons, featuring Joe Fiedler, Jeff Lederer, Michael Bates, Rob Garcia, and Sarah Stiles, was named "One of the Best Albums of 2016" by Down Beat and "One of the Best Indie Albums of 2016" by Goldmine (magazine). Pearly Clouds, an exploration of traditional Hungarian folk music, featuring saxophonist Toni Dezso and vocalist Eniko Szabo, was called "a record of spiritual longing and timeless musical transcendence" by FRoots and described as "unusual and compelling listening" by BBC Three. The acoustic folk pop collaboration with Jann Klose, Stereopticon was given four stars by Mojo (magazine). No Depression (magazine) wrote of the record, saying "the harmonies, vocal interactions, and clear precise acoustic guitar provide the listener with enchanting listening.”

2021 finally saw the release of Gary's 40-year retrospective double album THE ESSENTIAL GARY LUCAS on Knitting Factory Records, after many delays in the previous year due to the pandemic. The critical response to date to the compilation has been tremendous, with 3 high-profile reviews in the UK. MOJO gave the album four stars, calling it an "extraordinary 2-CD retrospective." The Wire said, “There isn't a single item here that doesn't have Lucas's musical personality running through it like quartz. Essential? It's all essential." UnCut called it "A testament to the man's restless energy and imagination."

The media coverage continued with an hour-plus appearance on music critic David Fricke's show, "The Writer's Block", on the SIRIUS XM radio February 10, and an interview in Aquarium Drunkard. Lucas was Artist of the Week in the second week of February on WPKN in Bridgeport Conn where his track "King Strong" rose to #3 Favorite Track of the Week.

Several new clips for the retrospective album include "Out From Under" featuring Haydee and Suylen Milanes and Los Van Van, "Follow" created by Mexican animation whizzes Nadia and Anahi Rubalcava, "After Strange Gods", "Flavor Bud Living", and the latest clip, a Mandarin version of Bob Dylan's "All Along the Watchtower" translated and sung by Feifei Yang. On Chinese New Year Feb. Gary and Feifei streamed a special hour-long concert of their Edge of Heaven Chinese show for the Queens Public Library in Astoria.

=== Awards and honors ===
In 2009, Classic Rock named Lucas one of the "100 Greatest Living Guitarists". In October 2013, Lucas received a Lifetime Achievement Award at the Barezzi Festival in Parma, Italy. Lucas was given an Acker Award for Achievement in Avant Garde Music in June 2014.

The U.S. Consul General of Milan, Philip T. Reeker, presented Lucas with the Consul General's Award for Cultural Diplomacy on March 21, 2015, following a special performance and reception at U.S. Consulate in Milan.

Lucas received the Lifetime Achievement Award at the Premio Ciampi Festival in Tuscany, named for the Italian songwriter Piero Ciampi, in December 2015.

== Film and television scores ==
Lucas has composed and performed live accompaniment for several films throughout his career, the first having been a score to the 1920 silent film The Golem: How He Came into the World, composed with Walter Horn and debuted in 1989 at the Brooklyn Academy of Music Next Wave Festival. Since that premiere, a solo, guitar version of the accompaniment to The Golem has been performed at numerous venues and festivals around the world.

In Fall 2009, Gary Lucas debuted his new live program of solo guitar arrangements of famous film music at the 5th Jecheon International Music & Film Festival in South Korea. He was also invited by the Festival Internacional del Nuevo Cine Latinoamerica to preview his score for the Spanish version of Dracula (1931) at the 31st Havana Film Festival in Havana, Cuba. Lucas performed the European premiere of his Spanish "Dracula" project at the 9th Transylvania International Film Festival in Cluj-Napoca, Romania, on May 30, 2010, in the open-air outside the Banfi Botzida Castle.

Lucas returned to Cuba in December 2010 for the 32nd Havana Film Festival, and debuted a new live score accompanying a Brazilian horror classic, Esta Noite Encarnerei no teu Cadaver ("Tonight I will Possess Your Corpse").

Throughout 2013, Lucas extensively toured his live film accompaniments. His long-running live score to George Melford's Drácula was performed at the Jerusalem Film Festival, the Silent Movie Theatre in Hollywood, the Cineteca Nacional in Mexico City, the United Palace Theatre in Harlem, Kino Aero in Prague, and Kino Siska in Slovenia. Lucas's live score to José Mojica Marins' "Esta Noite Encarnerei no teu Cadaver" saw its European debut at the Melkweg in Amsterdam in May 2013.

Lucas has continued to perform his live film accompaniments, including Monsters of the Id at Monsterpalooza in Burbank, and This Night I will Possess Your Corpse at the Wexner Center for the Arts. He also premiered live accompaniment to the 1934 silent, Chinese film The Goddess in early 2014. Fall of 2014 saw the premiere of new live scores to Frankenstein and Vampyr.

In 2016, Gary performed his live solo score to The Goddess (1934 film), originally premiered at Foundation Botin in Santander, Spain, at Pioneer Works in Red Hook Brooklyn. His live accompaniment to The Exterminating Angel, which premiered at the Havana Film Festival in 2011, was also debuted in the United States at Pioneer Works.

2017 saw the premiere at Roulette in Brooklyn of Gary's new live score for Orson Welles' 1938 silent classic Too Much Johnson. A new film score set to a fragment of the Russian futurist avant-garde short Shackled By Film (starring Vladimir Mayakovsky and Lilya Brik was premiered at Emir Kusturica's Kustendorf International Film Festival in January 2018. In February 2018, Lucas returned to Roulette to premiere a new live film score to a collection of short films by visionary film director Curtis Harrington

- The Golem: How He Came into the World with Walter Horn.
- The Unholy Three, commissioned by Film Society of Lincoln Center).
- J'accuse with Dutch-Iranian composer Reza Namavar, commissioned by the Netherlands Holland Festival.
- The Exterminating Angel
- Dracula, the score Lucas has toured most frequently, having been performed at several film and music festivals.
- This Night I'll Possess Your Corpse
- The Goddess debuted at Fundación Botín in January 2014 as part of the "Golden Age of Chinese Cinema" series curated by Film Society of Lincoln Center Director Emeritus Richard Pena.
- Vampyr was premiered at AFI Silver in fall of 2014.
- Frankenstein premiered at United Palace on Halloween 2014.
- Cinefantastique (solo guitar arrangements of famous film music), named one of the Top 10 Roots Albums of 2013 by the Philadelphia City Paper and Best Guitar Album of the year by Gapplegate Guitar and Bass Blog.
- Too Much Johnson premiered at Roulette Intermedium Brooklin in January 2017
- The Short Films of Curtis Harrington, a collection of short films accompanied by a live score by Lucas, premiered in February 2017 at Roulette Intermedium Brooklyn.
- American Faust: From Condi to Neo-Condi an award-winning documentary on Condoleezza Rice, directed by Sebastian Doggart, additional scoring
- Trust Me (a Showtime documentary, original score)
- Bed and Breakfast 9/11 (an award-winning documentary shown on PBS)
- The Legacy of Jedwabne (documentary by Sławomir Grünberg)
- LaLee's Kin: The Legacy of Cotton (an Oscar-nominated Maysles Films documentary for HBO, screened at the Museum of Modern Art in New York as part of their Maysles Films 50 Year Retrospective; Variety wrote: "Gary Lucas' Delta blues guitar music adds vivid color to this report from America's forgotten underbelly")
- Dragon Boys (Canadian "movie of the week") 2007.
- For Love and Honor (Erik Greenberg Anjou's documentary about American Ivy League collegiate football).
- American Faust: From Condi to Neo-Condi (score, 2010)
- In the early 2000s, Lucas performed a guitar rendition of the theme music to BBC1 soap opera EastEnders.
- "Farewell Angelina" as performed by Lucas and Jeff Buckley was featured on Roadies (TV series).

== Selected discography ==
- Skeleton at the Feast (1991)
- Gods and Monsters (1992)
- Bad Boys of the Arctic (1994)
- Pražská Strašidla (The Ghosts of Prague) with Urfaust (1996)
- Evangeline (1997)
- Busy Being Born (1998)
- @ Paradiso (1999)
- The Du-Tels – No Knowledge of Music Required with Peter Stampfel (2000)
- Street of Lost Brothers (2000)
- Level the Playing Field: Early HurlyBurly 1988–1994 (2000)
- The Edge of Heaven (Label Bleu, 2001)
- Songs to No One 1991–1992 with Jeff Buckley (2002)
- Operators Are Standing By: The Essential Gary Lucas 1989-1996 (2003)
- Diplopia with Jozef van Wissem (2003)
- The Universe of Absence with Jozef van Wissem (2004)
- Fast 'n' Bulbous – Pork Chop Blue Around the Rind (2005)
- Coming Clean (2006)
- Musical Blazeup with DJ Cosmo (2007)
- The Dark Poets - Beyond the Pale (2008)
- Chase the Devil with Dean Bowman (2008)
- Rock the Joint with Beardyman (2008)
- Down the Rabbit Hole with Gerald Zbindin (2008)
- Purple Somersault with DJ Cosmo (2008)
- Fast 'n' Bulbous – Waxed Oop (2009)
- Rishte with Najma Akhtar (2009)
- "Music for the Eden Project" / "Q & A", solo single (2010)
- The Ordeal of Civility (2011)
- Gary Lucas Plays Bohemian Classics, Czech Republic (2012)
- Popular Science with M'Lumbo, (Pursuance, 2013)
- Cinefantastique (Northern Spy, 2013)
- Other World, duo with Peter Hammill (Esoteric Antenna, 2014)
- Fleischerei (Cuneiform, 2016)
- Pearly Clouds (Trapeze, 2016)
- Stereopticon with Jann Klose (Cosmic Trigger, 2016)
- The World of Captain Beefheart (Knitting Factory, 2017)
- The Complete Jeff Buckley and Gary Lucas Songbook (Esordisco, 2019)
- The Essential Gary Lucas (Knitting Factory, 2021)
