= Rachel Flowers =

American musician and composer (born 1993)

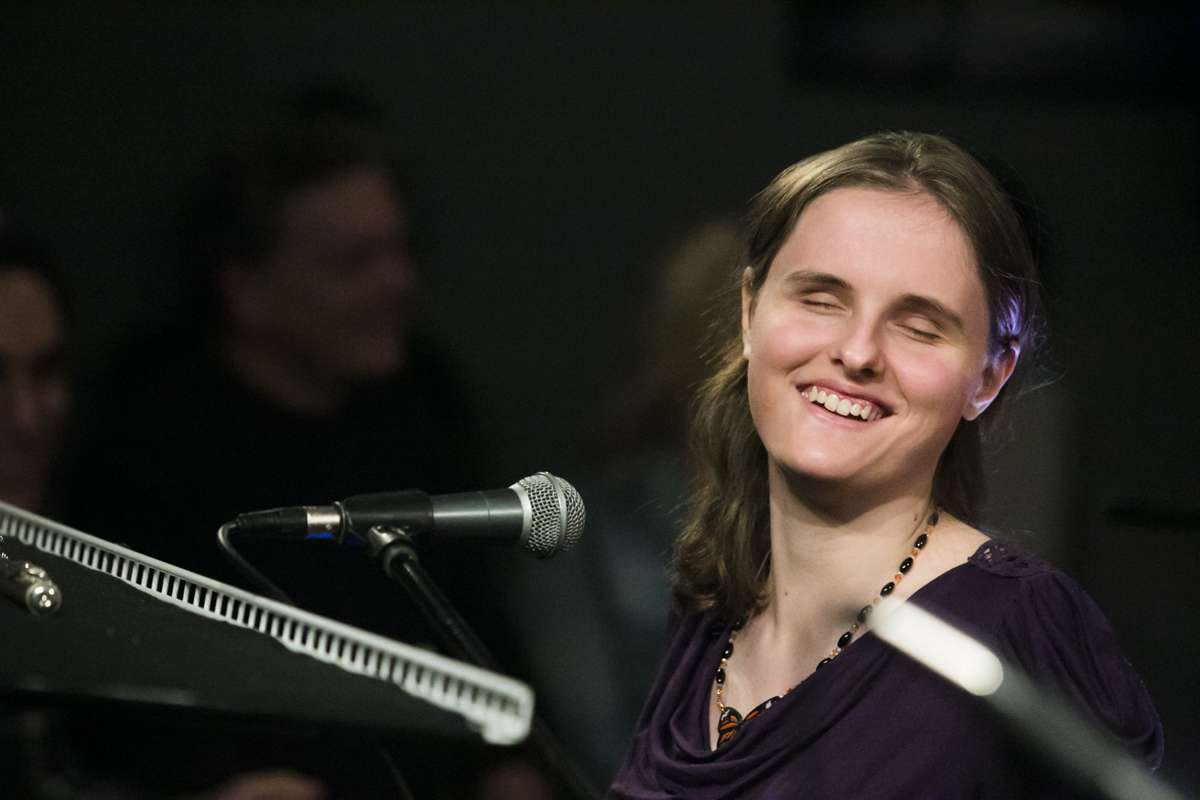
- Rachel Flowers with the Taylor Eigsti Trio at the Blue Whale, Los Angeles, California, January 15, 2015

Background information
- Born: December 21, 1993 (age 32); National City, California
- Genres: Jazz; Jazz fusion; Contemporary classical; Progressive rock; R&B; Rock
- Occupations: Musician, composer
- Years active: 2000–present
- Website: rachelflowersmusic.com

Rachel Flowers (born December 21, 1993) is an American multi-instrumentalist and composer.

== Career ==
Flowers was born 15 weeks prematurely, which resulted in her becoming permanently blind a few weeks after her birth.

Flowers took second place in the student jazz contest at the Ventura Music Festival in Ventura, California, in 2010, and won it the following year.

She has performed with Dweezil Zappa, Arturo Sandoval, Taylor Eigsti, Jeff "Skunk" Baxter, Marc Bonilla, Jordan Rudess, Steve Porcaro, Rick Wakeman, Burt Bacharach, and Bob Reynolds.

A documentary film about her, Hearing Is Believing, was released in 2017.

== Discography ==
- 2016 – Listen
- 2017 – Hearing Is Believing (Music from the Soundtrack)
- 2018 – Going Somewhere
- 2021 – Bigger on the Inside
- 2024 – In the Moment
