= Pitch Black Afro =

- Born: Thulani Howard Ngcobo; 1979 (age 46–47); Soweto, Johannesburg, South Africa
- Genres: Hip-Hop; Kwaito
- Occupation: Rapper
- Instrument: Vocals
- Years active: 2003–present
- Labels: Ghetto Ruff International; Will Of Steel Productions

Pitch Black Afro, (real name Thulani Ngcobo; born 1979) is a South African Kwaito/Hip hop MC from Soweto. He found rapping a successful way to control his stutter, and commonly wears an Afro wig.

Pitch Black Afro's style is similar to that of American MC's, citing Redman as an influence, but raps in English, Zulu and a slangy mixture of different languages called tsotsitaal.

He became a favourite on the club scene often playing with "The Native Huts Allstars" and was eventually discovered by DJ Cleo during a stint doing "Rap Activity Jams" on YFM radio. His first album was produced by Cleo and released in 2004, selling 50,000 copies in South Africa with hit singles Pitch Black Afro, Matofotofo & A Day in my Life. This made his debut album, Styling Gel, the biggest ever selling African Hip Hop album at the time, until Cassper Nyovest released his debut album Tsholofelo in 2014 which went platinum sales since Pitch Black Afro and another South African rapper Emtee broke Cassper's record after he released his album Avery which went double platinum that was first on S.A hip hop. He followed this with his second album "Split Enz" in 2006.

In 2006, Pitch Black Afro was accused of assaulting a fan and causing damage to property in a Johannesburg mall.

Pitch Black Afro was arrested on 9 January 2019 for allegedly murdering his wife on New Year's Eve in 2018. He was charged (in the Magistrates Court of Johannesburg, held at Johannesburg) with premeditated murder and defeating the ends of justice.

He has since been sentenced to five years in jail for the murder of his wife.

Pitch Black Afro was released in 2023 after serving 3 years in prison for the murder of his wife.

== Recordings ==
- 2004 – Styling Gel
- 2006 – Split Endz
- 2009 – Zonke Bonke!!!
- Int'emnandi
