= Gods and Monsters (band) =

American music group

Gods and Monsters is an American psychedelic rock band from New York City, led by guitarist Gary Lucas and known for once having singer-songwriter Jeff Buckley as a member.

Lucas named the group after a line of dialogue from the 1935 horror film Bride of Frankenstein: "To a new world of gods and monsters!". Gods and Monsters has performed at Manhattan music venues such as the Knitting Factory and CBGB. Other members of the loosely-knit band have included Jerry Harrison, Billy Ficca, Richard Barone, and Modern Lovers member Ernie Brooks. Emily Duff (Her last name then was her maiden name) replaced Jeff Buckley as lead singer after he left to start his solo career.
