= Gods and Monsters (Gary Lucas album) =

Studio album by Gary Lucas
- Released: 1992
- Recorded: Knitting Factory, New York City, NY
- Genre: Art rock
- Length: 44:33
- Label: Enemy
- Producer: Gary Lucas

Gary Lucas chronology
Skeleton at the Feast (1991)	Gods and Monsters (1992)	Bad Boys of the Arctic (1994)

Professional ratings
Review scores
Source	Rating
AllMusic	3/5 stars
Rolling Stone	4/5 stars

Gods and Monsters is the debut studio album of Gary Lucas, released in 1992 through Enemy Records.

== Track listing ==
All tracks are written by Gary Lucas, except where noted.

No.	Title	Writer(s)	Length
1.	"Glo-Worm"		3:33
2.	"Skin the Rabbit"	Gary Lucas, Rolo McGinty	3:50
3.	"Poison Tree"		3:31
4.	"Jack Johnson/Ghost Rider"	Miles Davis/Suicide	4:22
5.	"Whip Named Lash"		5:04
6.	"Fool's Cap"		3:23
7.	"Astronomy Domine"	Syd Barrett	3:05
8.	"The Brain from Planet Eros"	Gary Lucas, Tony Maimone	5:01
9.	"Dream of a Russian Princess"		1:49
10.	"The Crazy Ray"		3:56
11.	"King Strong"		6:52

== Personnel ==
Musicians

- Gary Lucas – vocals, guitar, production, arrangements (1–11)
- Rolo McGinty – vocals (1, 2, 5, 7); keyboards (7); bass and snare (8)
- Mary Margaret O'Hara – vocals (3)
- Jon Langford – vocals and guitar (8)
- K-Rob – vocals (10)
- Jared Michael Nickerson – bass guitar (1, 3–5, 10)
- Tony Maimone – bass guitar (8)
- Paul Now – bass guitar (10, 11), sampler (10, 11)
- Tony Thunder Smith – drums (1, 3, 5, 10)
- Michael Blair – drums (4), percussion (5)
- Keith Leblanc – drums and drum programming (11)
- Cameo – turntables (10)

Production

- John Azelvandre – engineering
- Harold Burgon – engineering
- Johnny Byrne – engineering
- Francis Manzella – engineering
- Skip McDonald – engineering
- Chuck Valle – engineering
- Stephen Byrum – art direction, design
- Greg Calbi – mastering
- Anton Corbijn – photography
