= Clouse =

Clouse is an English surname. Notable people with it include:

- Mark Clouse (born 1968), American businessman
- Michael J. Clouse, American record producer and songwriter
- Robert Clouse (1928–1997), American film director and producer
- Robert Clouse (professor) (1931–2016), American religious scholar
- Steve Clouse (born 1956), American politician
- Wynne F. Clouse (1883–1944), American politician

== See also ==
- Clouse (Ninjago), a character in Ninjago
