= New Albany Lecture Series =

Annual lecture in Ohio

The New Albany Lecture Series is an annual lecture and educational event series in New Albany, Ohio, featuring nationally and internationally prominent speakers. Organized by the New Albany Community Foundation since 2014, the series has brought leaders in public affairs, international affairs, health, history, business and the arts to Central Ohio.

== Educational significance ==
Intended to inspire lifelong learning, The New Albany Lecture Series programs are open to students from local school districts as well as the general public. Students have said that the experience of attending New Albany Lecture Series events has changed their worldview, sparked their desire to learn, and inspired them to pursue ambitious career goals. Guest speakers also meet with students in smaller groups as part of a student lecture program in which more than 15,000 students have participated.

In a typical example, more than 1,000 students representing 29 schools in central Ohio participated in a New Albany Lecture Series program featuring Newt Gingrich and Valerie Jarrett in January 2020. In discussing the program, Jarrett, a former advisor to President Barack Obama, said that New Albany’s efforts to promote civil discourse should be emulated “in schools, on college campuses and on factory floors across America.”

== Notable events and speakers ==
=== 2021–2022 ===
Isabel Wilkerson, a bestselling author and Pulitzer Prize winner in journalism, kicked off the series in October with a virtual visit, speaking on issues involving social justice. Additional speakers included Olympic champion and mental health advocate Michael Phelps and another mental health advocate, Margaret Trudeau. An event on national security features H.R. McMaster, a retired U.S. Army lieutenant general who served as national security adviser under President Donald J. Trump, moderated by Mary Louise Kelly, cohost of “All Things Considered” on National Public Radio. A moderated debate between Robert Reich, labor secretary under President Bill Clinton, and Karl Rove, deputy chief of staff for President George W. Bush, caps the season.

=== 2020–2021 ===
The 2020–21 season shifted from ticketed, in-person events to free, virtual events in response to the Covid-19 pandemic. The series also highlighted themes of social justice, diversity and inclusion. Princeton University professor Eddie S. Glaude Jr. was interviewed by NBC4's Darlene Hill on Sept. 16. Historian and author Ibram X. Kendi participated in a dialogue with lawyer and author Michelle Alexander on Oct. 21. On Jan. 27th, thousands of viewers remotely watched a debate between CNN commentator and former Obama advisor David Axelrod and former New Jersey Gov. Chris Christie. Award-winning author and National Geographic Fellow Dan Buettner gave a talk on health and longevity on Feb. 22.

=== 2019–2020 ===
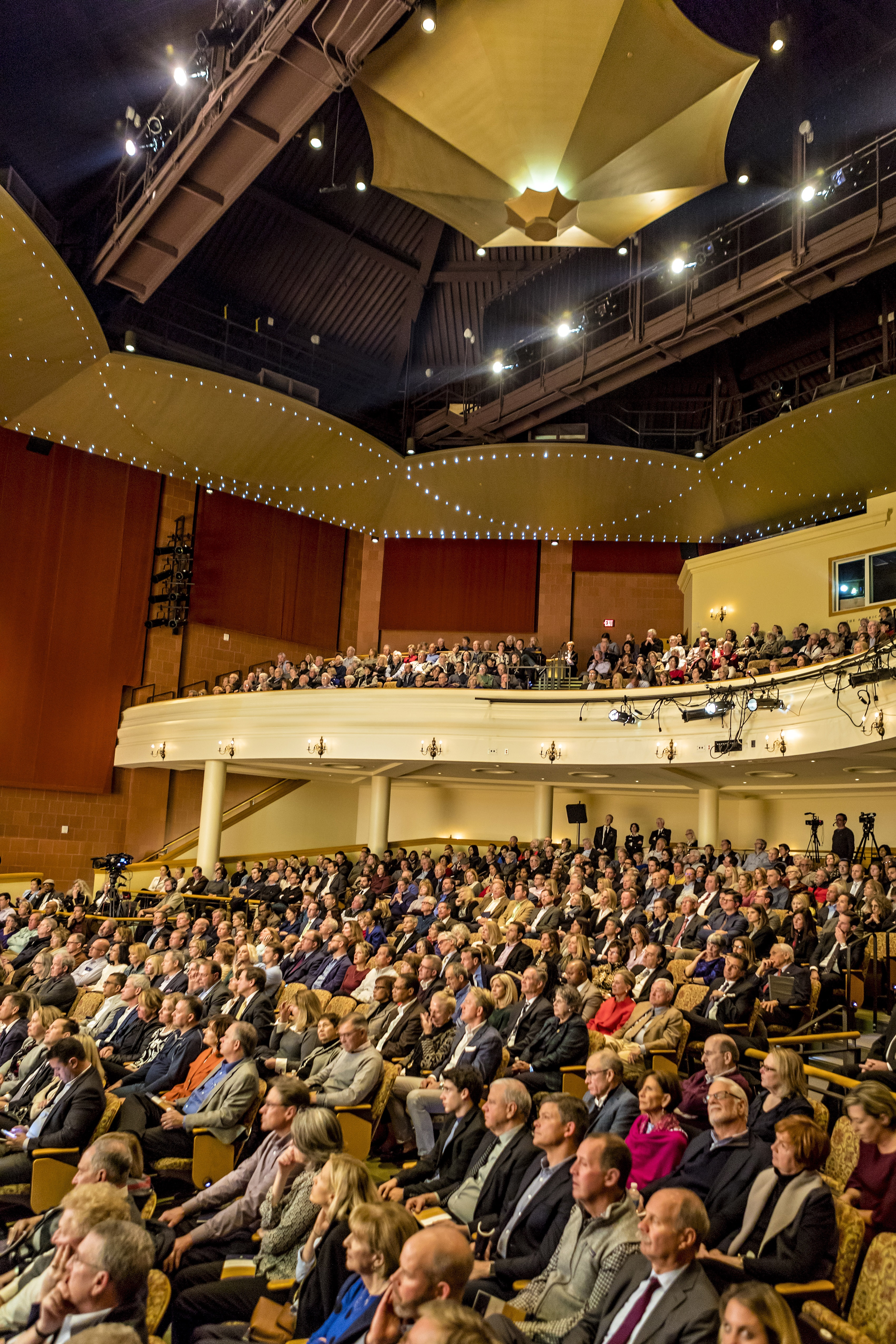
New Albany Lecture Series 2018 event at the Jeanne B. McCoy Community Center for the Arts in New Albany, Ohio

In October 2019, a New Albany Lecture Series panel discussion featured two former U.S. Secretaries of State, Madeleine Albright and Colin Powell, moderated by CNN host Fareed Zakaria. Powell’s comments, broadcast on CNN, drew national attention and debate. Newt Gingrich, a former Speaker of the U.S. House of Representatives, and Valerie Jarrett, a former senior adviser to President Barack Obama, engaged in a dialogue on stage in New Albany on January 28, 2020, before students from 29 local schools. Organized with the New Albany Center for Civil Discourse and Debate, the program offered “A surprising level of civility between the woman who helped shape the Obama agenda and the man… credited with leading the Republican Revolution in 1994,” according to NBC news anchor Colleen Marshall.

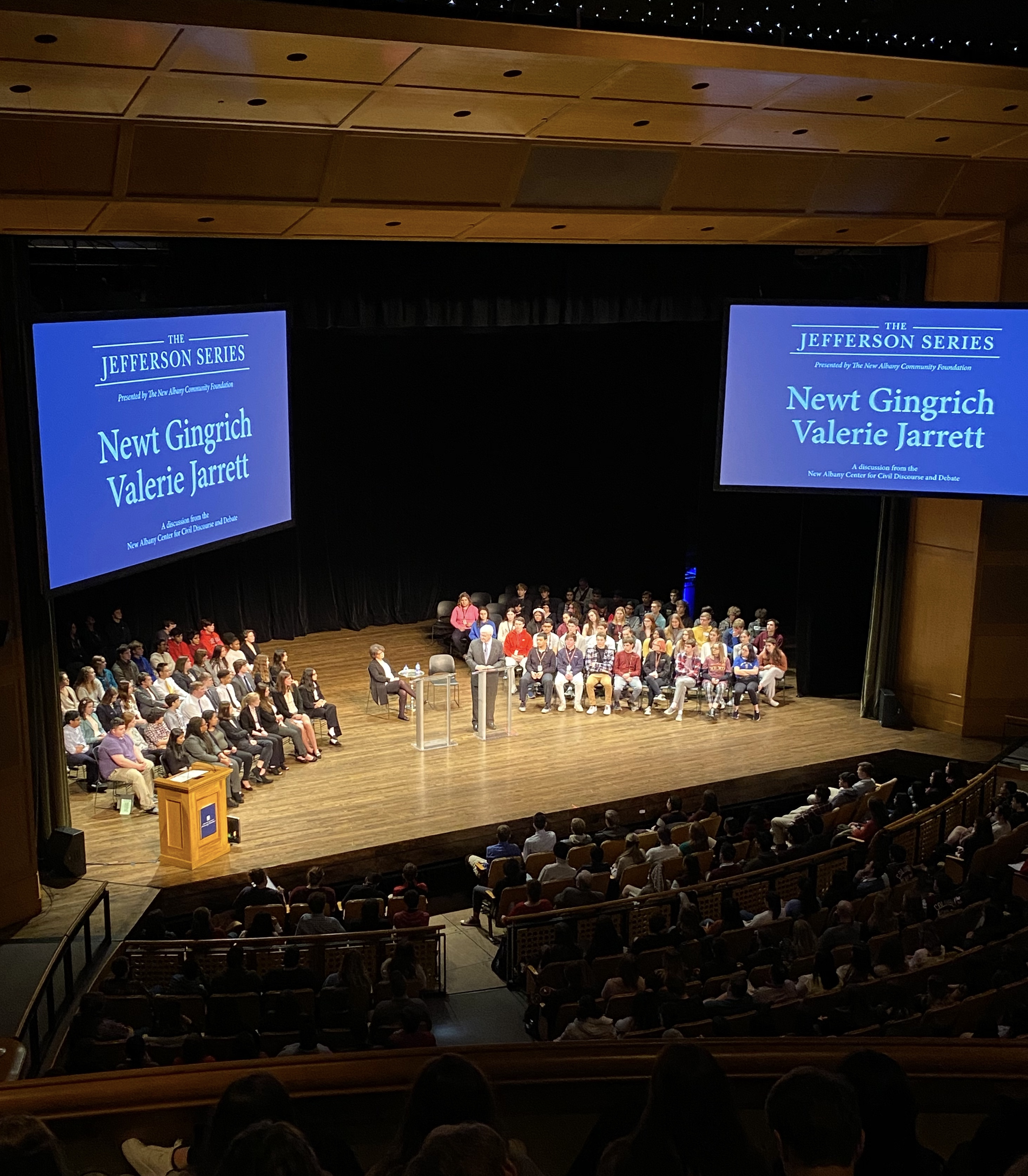
Newt Gingrich and Valerie Jarrett speak to students about civil discourse as part of The New Albany Lecture Series in New Albany, Ohio

=== 2018–2019 ===
The 2018–2019 New Albany Lecture Series programs included visits from health expert Dr. Sanjay Gupta, a national-security town hall featuring former United Nations ambassador Samantha Power, former CIA director Michael Hayden and former National Security Advisor Stephen Hadley, and actress and mental-health advocate Glenn Close. Close was the fourth New Albany Lecture Series speaker to address mental health and well-being. The final event of the season, a May 1 lecture featuring Harvard law professor and Bloomberg columnist Noah Feldman and CNN senior analyst and bestselling author Jeffrey Toobin, was also the first program for the New Albany Center for Civil Discourse and Debate, a platform for students and residents to come together and discuss opposing views freely, passionately and respectfully.

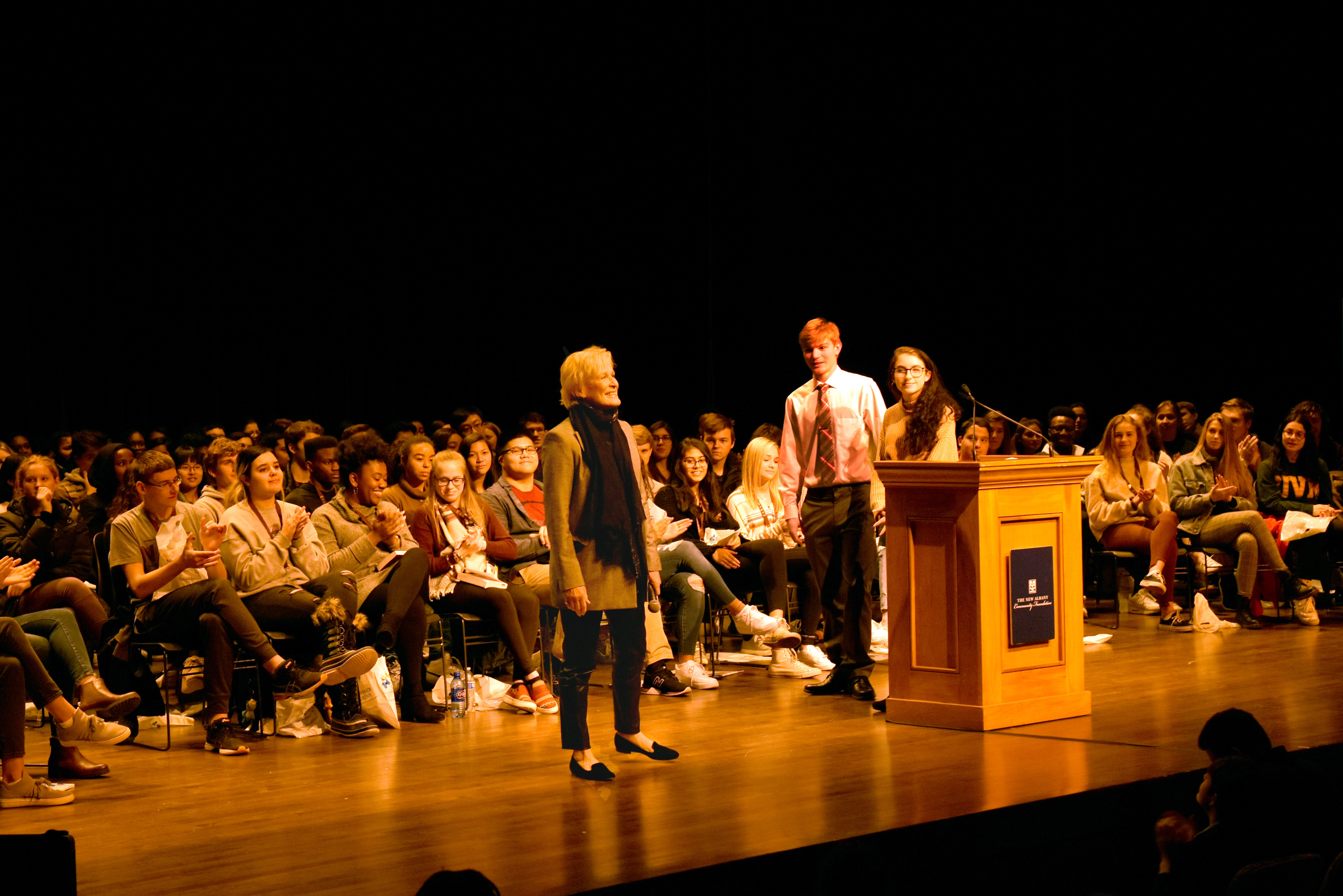
Actress and mental health advocate Glenn Close speaks to central Ohio students as part of The New Albany Lecture Series Student Lecture program at The McCoy in New Albany, Ohio

=== 2017–2018 ===
In February 2018, the New Albany Community Foundation convened a national security panel discussion with General Michael Hayden, General Stanley McChrystal and General Peter Pace for moderated by CNN’s Dr. Fareed Zakaria. The 2017–2018 New Albany Lecture Series also included a presentation by Emmy Award-winning news anchor and author Charles Osgood, who shared inspiring stories from his professional career in television broadcasting, and a presentation by noted journalist and author Elizabeth Vargas, “Overcoming Anxiety: A Private Struggle, A Public Recovery.”

=== 2016–2017 ===
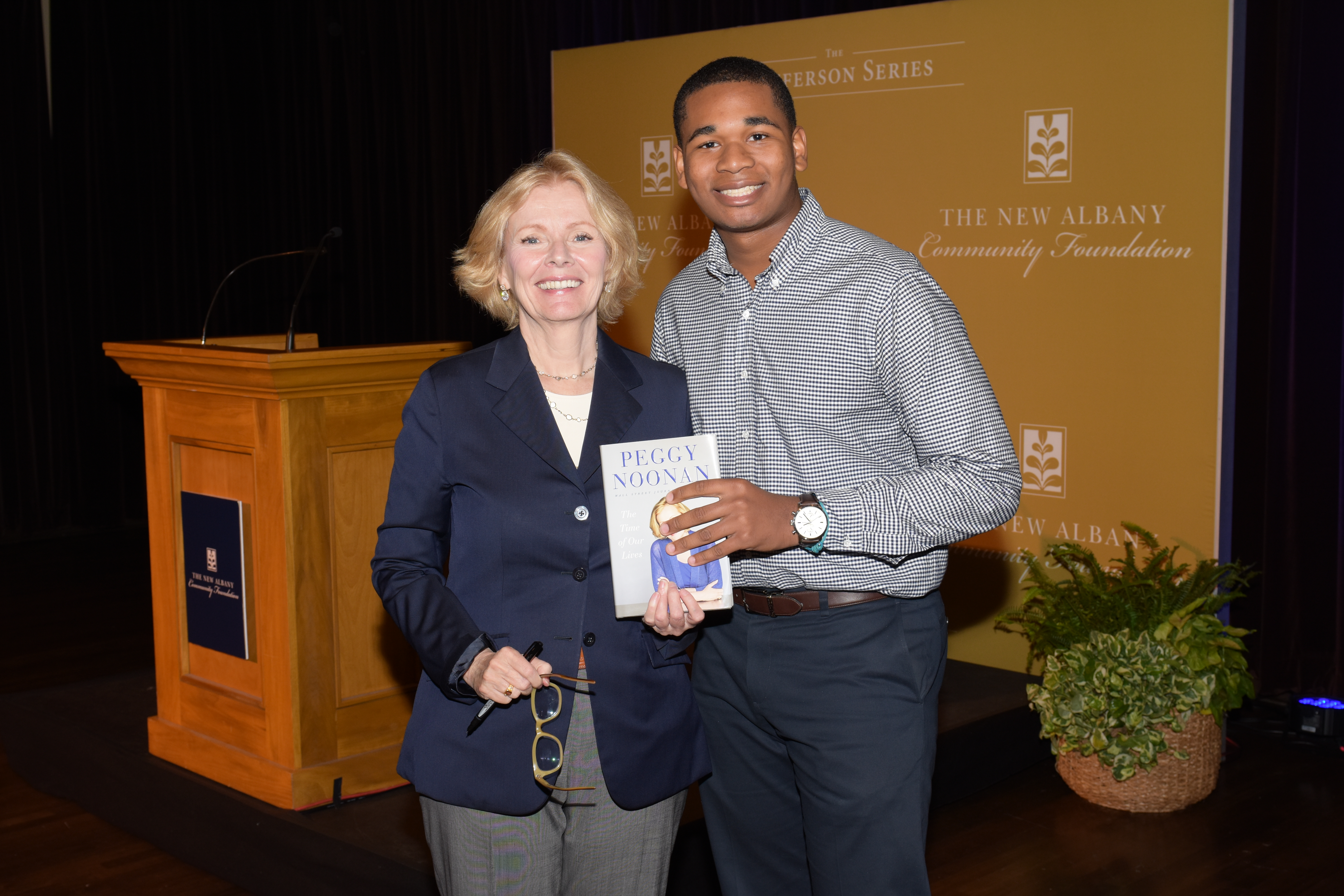
Peggy Noonan meets with students at a 2016 New Albany Lecture Series event in New Albany, Ohio

Presidential speechwriter Peggy Noonan participated in New Albany Lecture Series programs in October 2016. In April 2017 the New Albany Community Foundation hosted retired General David H. Petraeus for a public lecture and student event in New Albany. Petraeus said of the event, “It’s wonderful to be part of a community that clearly places so much emphasis on education.” A New Albany Lecture Series program in January 2017 featured speaker Patrick J. Kennedy, a former congressman and leading advocate for mental health and substance abuse care, research and policy. Kennedy’s visit help the local school district launch a well-being initiative for students.

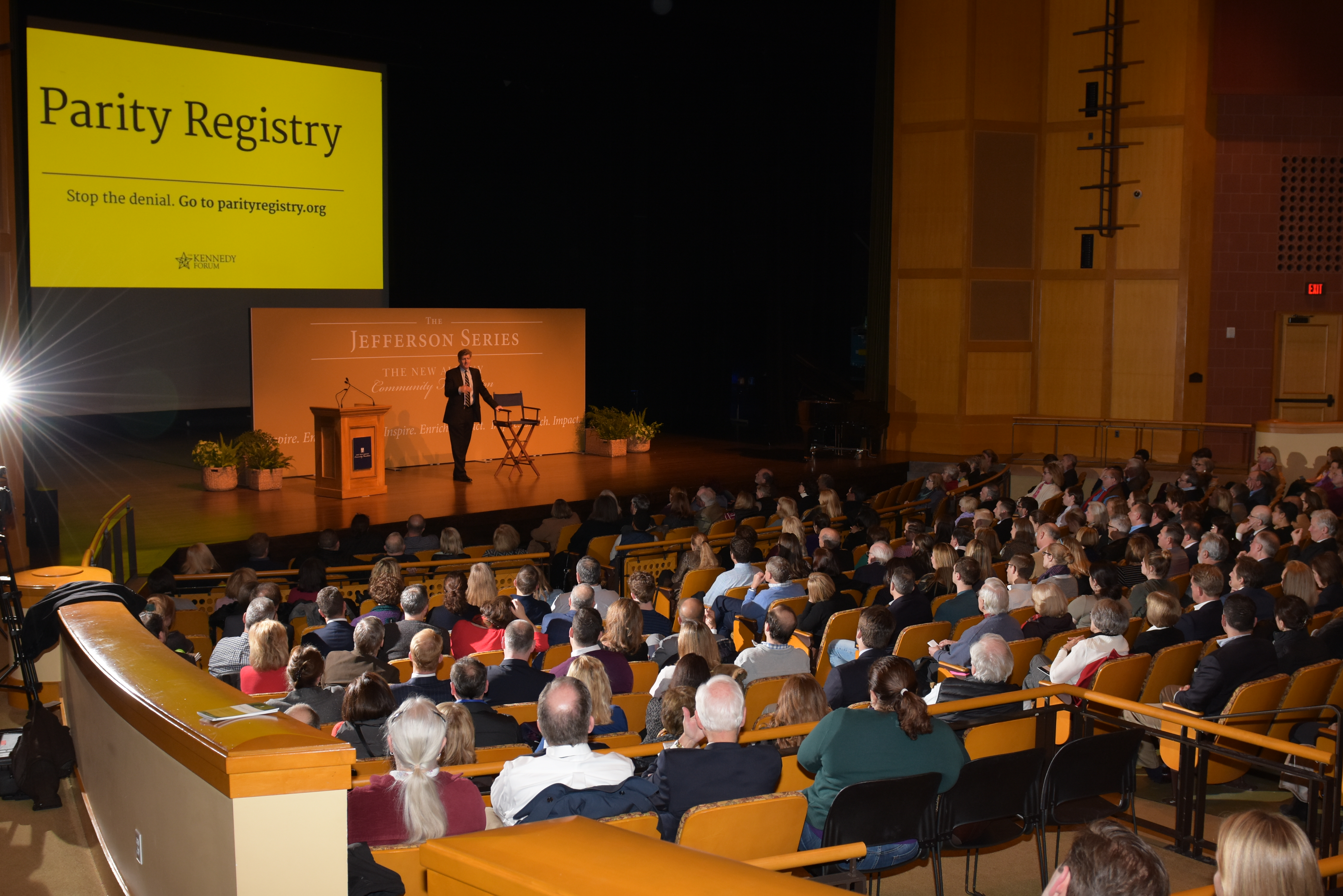
Former U.S. Senator and mental Health advocate Patrick J. Kennedy speaks at a 2016 New Albany Lecture Series program in New Albany, Ohio, presented by The New Albany Community Foundation

=== 2015–2016 ===
In the first of several New Albany Lecture Series events focusing on mental health and well-being, the New Albany Community Foundation hosted Mariel Hemingway in October 2015, in an effort to "initiate a community dialogue and decrease the stigma surrounding mental-health issues." Additionally, the 2015-16 series included presentations by Harvard political philosopher Michael Sandel, presidential historian Jon Meacham, and two-time Pulitzer Prize-winning author and historian David McCullough.

=== 2014–2015 ===
Energy executive T. Boone Pickens spoke about achieving energy independence at the inaugural New Albany Lecture Series program in February 2014, held at the Jeanne B. McCoy Community Center for the Arts in New Albany. In a subsequent program, Pulitzer Prize-winning historian Doris Kearns Goodwin spoke on the unique leadership qualities of presidents Abraham Lincoln, Theodore Roosevelt and Franklin Delano Roosevelt. Best-selling author Michael Pollan gave a lecture urging audience members to “Eat something your grandmother or great-grandmother would recognize as food.” In February 2015, the New Albany Community Foundation convened a panel discussion with prominent architects Jaque Robertson of Cooper Robertson, landscape architect Laurie Olin, former Harvard dean Gerald McCue, and Graham Wyatt of Robert A.M. Stern Architects, together with New Albany developers Leslie Wexner and Jack Kessler, to reflect on the planning and design of New Albany. The panelists discussed how the city’s Georgian brick architecture, central school campus, and pastoral common areas were influenced by Thomas Jefferson’s design for the University of Virginia and other traditional sources. Senator and former astronaut John Glenn gave a presentation in June 2015.

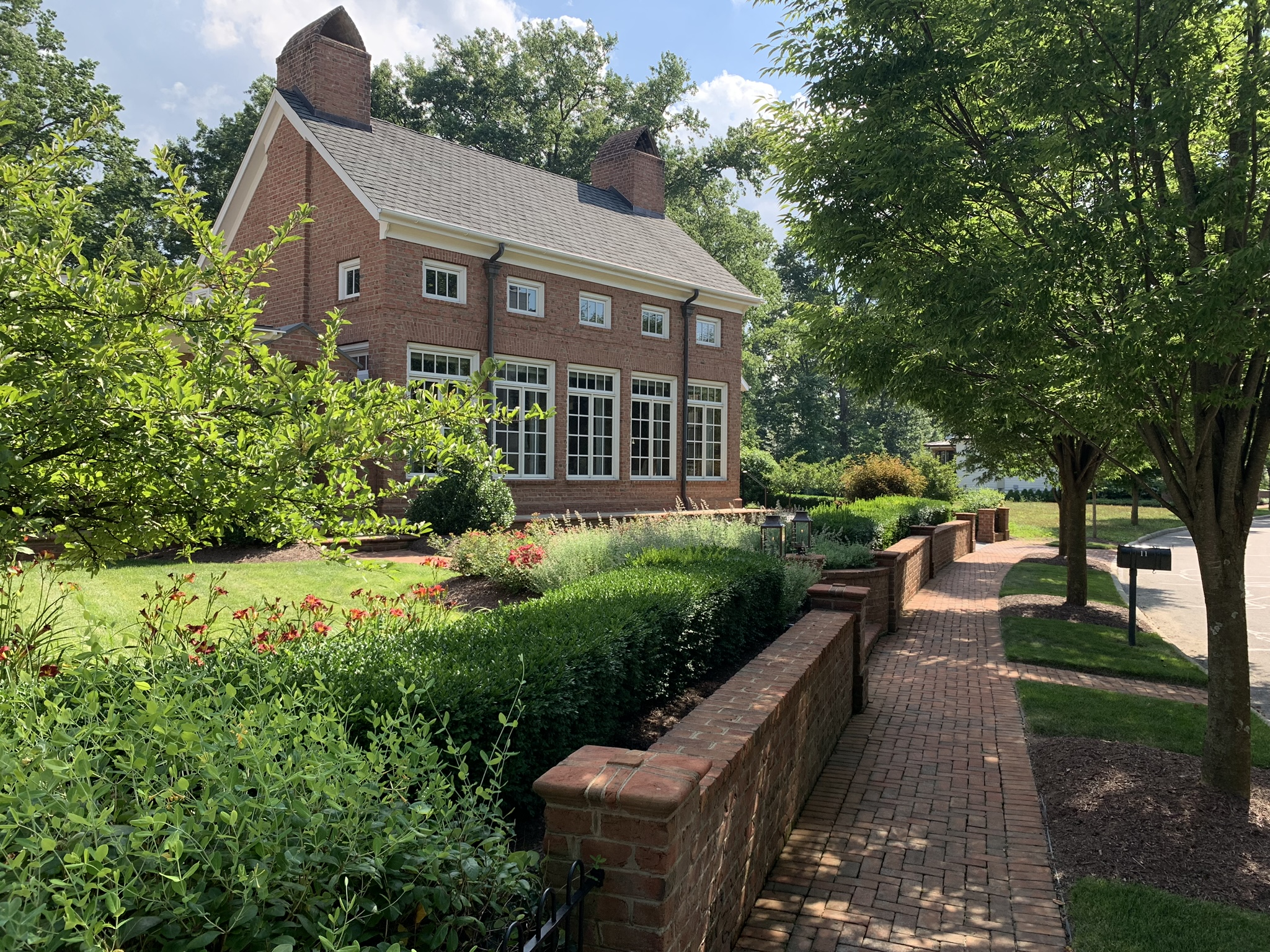
A red brick Georgian home in the Early Crossing neighborhood of New Albany, Ohio.

=== Pre-2014 ===
Prior to the establishment of The New Albany Lecture Series (originally the Jefferson Series) in 2014, the New Albany Community Foundation arranged at least eight student lectures in association with the Foundation’s annual fundraiser, A Remarkable Evening, which also brings in preeminent speakers from around the world. Student lectures by biographer Walter Isaacson in 2008, former Secretary of State Condoleezza Rice in 2011, and Dr. Paul Farmer in 2012, were all forerunners to The New Albany Lecture Series programs. Additionally, New Albany’s author residency program, began in 2011, featuring speakers such as Clarence B. Jones, a speechwriter and advisor to Martin Luther King Jr. Walter Isaacson, who has written biographies on Albert Einstein and Ben Franklin, told New Albany students in 2008, “Intelligent people are a dime a dozen. You meet intelligent people all the time. You can be imaginative and creative to help others or just be intelligent to help yourselves.”
