= New Albany-Plain Local School District =

School district in Ohio

Location
- New Albany, Ohio Midwest United States

District information
- Type: Public-Suburban
- Grades: K-12
- Superintendent: Mr. Michael Sawyers
- Budget: $46.9M (FY 2010)

Students and staff
- Students: 4,800
- Teachers: 306
- Athletic conference: Ohio Capital Conference, Capital Division
- Colors: Maroon/Gold

Other information
- Website: www.napls.us

The New Albany-Plain Local School District is located in and around New Albany, Ohio in central Ohio, about 20 miles (32 km) northeast of downtown Columbus, Ohio. The school district covers an area of 26 square miles (67 km^{2}), all (except for a small amount in Licking County) located in the northeast corner of Franklin County, Ohio. The district features eight buildings serving grades K-12 (including New Albany High School) all on one centrally located campus. The schools are connected by tree-lined walkways, and are surrounded by an 80-acre (320,000 m^{2}) nature preserve.

Most of the district is located in New Albany, with the rest in unincorporated Plain Township and the city of Columbus.

The average daily enrollment in the New Albany-Plain Local School District in the 2008–2009 school year was 4,985. The racial makeup of the students in the district was 78.2% White (non-Hispanic), 9.7% Asian or Pacific Islander, 6.3% Black (non-Hispanic), 1.7% Hispanic, and 3.9% Multi-Racial. 100% of district teachers had completed at least a Bachelor's Degree, and 71.2% had completed at least a Master's Degree. The School Board President is Laura Kohler. The graduation rate for the class of 2008 was 98.3%.

== History ==
In the 1820s in Plain Township, schooling had been taught in log cabins. In 1821, a frame school building was built on Central College Road; the teacher was Jacob Smith. In 1874, a new brick school was built in the Village. In 1956, a new elementary school across from the now Intermediate Elementary (now known as "the annex") was built.

In 1955 the Ohio General Assembly eliminated the requirement that cities and school districts have common borders. From the 1950s through the 1970s the City of Columbus aggressively annexed land, causing concern for local school districts. In 1980 the suburban school districts together persuaded the Ohio General Assembly to place a two-year moratorium on all big-city school district transfers. Concerned legislators asked school officials to work out a solution to the growing "turf war" over the changing school district boundaries. In 1982, when little progress was made toward arriving at an agreeable solution, the General Assembly extended the moratorium for another two years, but stated they would not renew it again in 1986. Once again, the districts were directed to develop permanent boundary and annexation agreements. State Representative Michael Stiniano (Columbus) and other community and education leaders convened a series of negotiations with the Franklin County school district officials in 1986. These officials eventually reached an agreement, the “Joint Agreement Among and Between the Boards of Education of Certain School Districts in Franklin County, Ohio”, nicknamed “Win-Win”. The agreement established mechanisms to predict school district boundaries among the twelve member districts. It set procedures for Columbus to acquire new territory in the future, and established revenue sharing between Columbus City Schools and the suburban districts. The success of the agreement's adoption resulted in the Ohio General Assembly's approval, and Governor Celeste's signing of the agreement.

The current brick schools were built in the late 1990s and 2000s. The Intermediate Elementary opened in 1999 and replaced two former elementary buildings, one of which was demolished and one used to be leased by the Columbus Jewish Day School. Now the Elementary school is slowly running out of teaching space therefore is slowly moving 2-4 5th grade classes every year into the annex. New Albany Middle School opened in August 2002. Prior to that, middle school classes were held in New Albany High School. The Primary(Referred to as K-1) Elementary opened in August 2003. Kindergarten and first grade were moved to that building and the Intermediate( Referred to as the 2-5 building) Elementary became for grades 2-5 only. The current New Albany High School was built in 1996. The school was expanded in 2002 to include an additional academic wing with offices, a new high school football stadium and additional locker rooms. Those improvements were completed in 2004.

== Notable graduates ==
- Chase Buchanan, tennis player
- Darron Lee, football player for the Ohio State Buckeyes football team
- Graham Rahal, IndyCar driver and son of Bobby Rahal

== See also ==
- New Albany, Ohio
- New Albany High School (Ohio)
- Plain Township, Franklin County, Ohio
