= New Hollow =

Rock Band

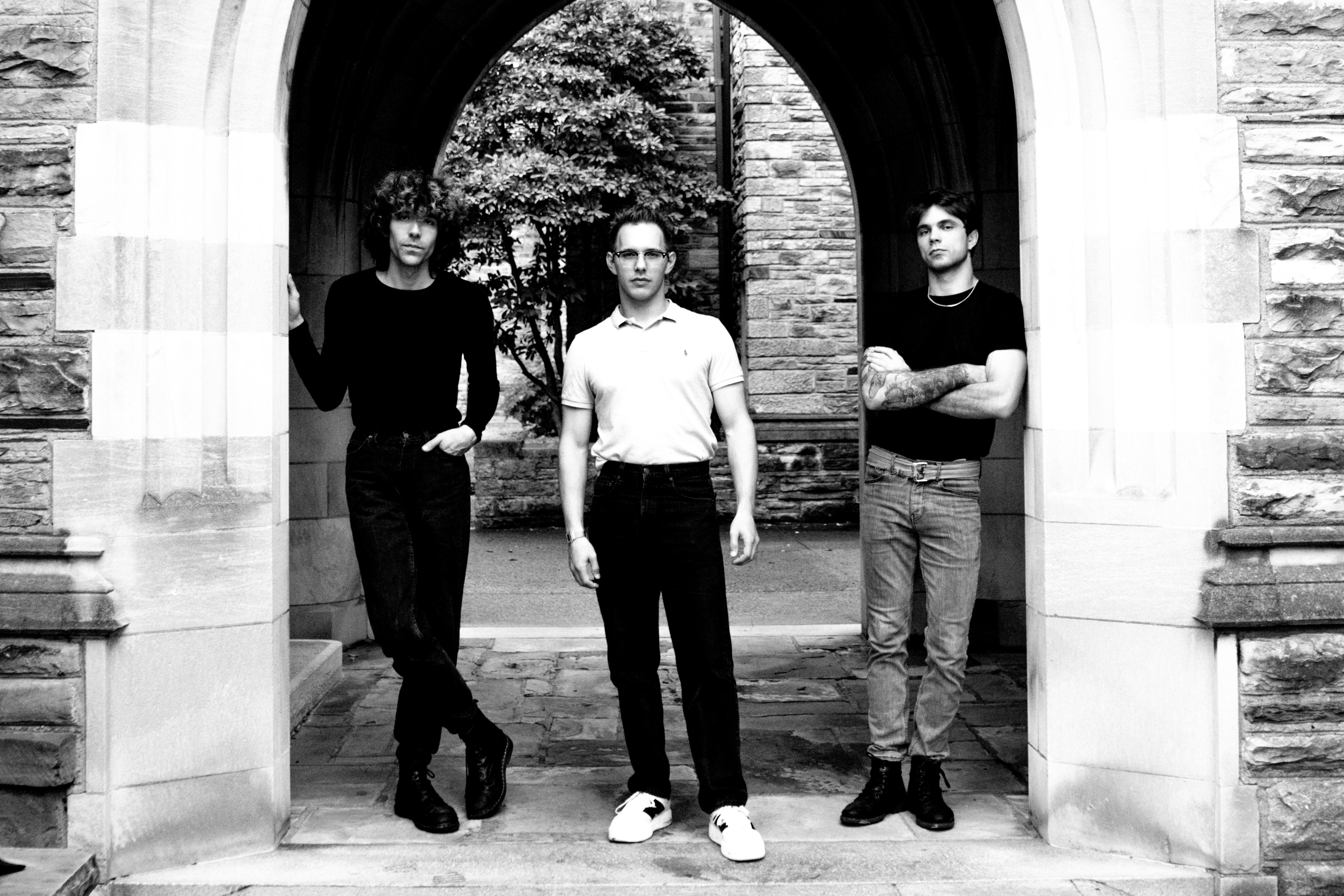

Background information
- Origin: New Albany, Ohio, United States
- Genres: Rock, Pop
- Years active: 2010-present
- Labels: 614 Records / Bee & El / SME / Epic Records / Monkee Hollow Records
- Members: Mookie Clouse; Evan West; Benjamin Gager
- Past members: Chad Blashford
- Website: www.newhollow.com

New Hollow is an American rock band from New Albany, Ohio. The band is currently based in Nashville, Tennessee and is composed of Michael "Mookie" Clouse, Evan West, and Benjamin Gager.

New Hollow was founded by three students at New Albany High School (Ohio), who initially began playing together while still elementary school students under the name Monkee Hollow. The single, entitled "SiCK", was released November 1, 2010, and reached the Billboard Hot 100, where it peaked at number 86. The single sold over 28,000 physical copies in its first week, en route to selling 140,000 units by early 2011. The group signed an agreement with Justice, a girls' clothing store, to market their debut single, with that deal ending in April 2013.

In November 2010, the band also performed The Star-Spangled Banner at the nationally televised Thanksgiving Day football game between the New Orleans Saints and the Dallas Cowboys on Fox TV.

On Jan. 23, 2011, the band released their second single "Boyfriend" and it entered the Billboard Hot 100 chart on Feb. 3, 2011, where it peaked at number 96.

On May 27, 2011, the band released their third single, a rock cover of the B.o.B/Hayley Williams song, "Airplanes", which charted at number 12 on the Bubbling Under Hot 100 chart.

On December 13, 2012, New Hollow's cover over "Airplanes" reappeared in the Billboard Hot Single Sales Chart at number 12 and the following week, "SiCK" & "Boyfriend" also re-entered the chart.

On July 3, 2013, the band's fourth single, an original titled, She Ain't You began getting airplay on SiriusXM radio.

In December 2013, She Ain't You was voted the "Breakthrough Song Of 2013" by The Pulse (Sirius XM), beating out "Let Her Go" by Passenger (singer), "Best Day of My Life" by American Authors and "Say Something" by A Great Big World.

On January 1, 2014, She Ain't You was voted the #18 song of year on The Pulse (Sirius XM) "Top 30 Countdown Of 2013".

On January 24, 2014, New Hollow signed a multi-album recording contract with LA Reid and Epic Records. She Ain't You was re-released and peaked in the twenties on both the Mediabase Top 40 and Hot AC charts.

The song "Jackie's Baby" co-written by Clouse & West with John Popper and featuring New Hollow was released in April 2015 on the new Blues Traveler album Blow Up the Moon.

In May 2015, New Hollow parted ways with Epic Records. In June 2015, the band signed a new deal with Bee & El/Sony Music Entertainment. New Hollow went in the studio to record with Michael J. Clouse and British producer Mikal Blue (OneRepublic, Colbie Caillat, Jason Mraz, Five For Fighting).

On July 8, 2015, the band released their self-penned single, "Why Don't You Love Me".

On June 3, 2016, Popstar (Is This What The Girls Like?) was released by 614 Music/Bee & El/Sony Music Entertainment on their eponymous EP.

Also in 2016, the self-title "New Hollow EP" was released containing the previous singles plus "Hurt No More" and "Jiffy Jane (Revolver Mix)".

In 2018, West and Clouse relocated to Nashville, TN to continue their writing, recording and producing.

In 2020, the band released "White Converse" right before the Pandemic.

In 2024, following a hiatus during the COVID-19 pandemic, the band reunited, added new drummer Benny Gager, and released "New Hollow Anthology 2008 - 2013" containing ten songs including, "Dear Edgar", "Let's Pretend", "I Surrender", Waste Of Time", and more.

Later the same year, the new singles Ambien and Wish I Was You were released.

In June 2025, the single HAPPY was released on Monkee Hollow Records.

== Members ==
- Mookie Clouse - guitar, drums, piano, bass, lead vocals
- Evan West - guitar, drums, keyboards, bass, lead vocals
- Benjamin Gager - drums, bkd. vocals

== Singles ==
Year	Title	Chart positions	
Year	Title	US	US Pop
2010	"Sick"	86	—
2011	"Boyfriend"	96	—
2011	"Airplanes"	112	—
2014	She Ain't You	—	31
2015	Jiffy Jane	—	
2015	Why Don't You Love Me	—	
2016	Popstar (Is This What The Girls Like?)	—	
2016	Hurt No More	—	
2019	A Thing	—	
2020	White Converse	—	
2024	Ambien	—	
2024	Wish I Was You	—	
2025	HAPPY	—	
