= New Albany High School (Ohio) =

Location
- 7600 Fodor Road; New Albany, Ohio 43054; United States; 40°5′10″N 82°48′58″W

Information
- Type: Public school
- Opened: 1996
- School district: New Albany-Plain Local School District
- Superintendent: Michael Sawyers
- Teaching staff: 98.60 (on an FTE basis)
- Grades: 9-12
- Enrollment: 1,596 (2023-2024)
- Student to teacher ratio: 16.19
- Colors: Maroon and gold
- Fight song: Across The Field
- Athletics conference: Ohio Capital Conference
- Nickname: Eagles
- Newspaper: The Talon
- Website: hs.napls.us

New Albany High School is a public high school located in New Albany, Ohio as part of the New Albany-Plain Local School District. New Albany is a four-year comprehensive high school accredited by the Ohio Department of Education.

== History ==
In the 1820s in Plain Township, schooling had been taught in log cabins. In 1821, a frame school building was built on Central College; the teacher was Jacob Smith. In 1874, a new brick school was built in the Village.

In 1955, the Ohio General Assembly eliminated the requirement that cities and school districts have common borders.

The current New Albany High School was built in 1996. The school was expanded in 2002 to include an additional academic wing with offices, a new high school football stadium and additional locker rooms. Those improvements were completed in 2004.

== Facilities ==
Part of New Albany's building project in 1996 was the completion of a natatorium. This facility is open to the community, as well as the students. It also hosts home meets for the New Albany Swimming and Diving team.

Built in 2008, The McCoy Center for the Arts is a multi-use art center with 35,000 square feet (3,300 m^{2}) and includes a 786-seat auditorium with balcony seating, partial fly loft, a large lobby, rehearsal studio, dance studio, scene shop and art classrooms. The McCoy Company and New Albany-Plain Local School District both share the building.

In 2013, an artificial turf football field was built inside the old football stadium. The football stadium was renamed "Veterans Field" in honor of all the alumni who served in the armed forces. The football field was an addition that was completely funded by donations from the public.

== Athletics ==
=== State championships ===
- Baseball – 2021, 2026
- Boys soccer – 2024

== Notable alumni ==
- Rifqa Bary, Sri Lankan–born American author
- Robert Cash, professional tennis player
- Darron Lee, NFL player
- Graham Rahal, IndyCar driver
- Kole Sherwood, National Hockey League player
- Drew Windle, American middle distance runner
- Aidan Morris, English Football League player
