= George and Christina Ealy House =

- U.S. National Register of Historic Places
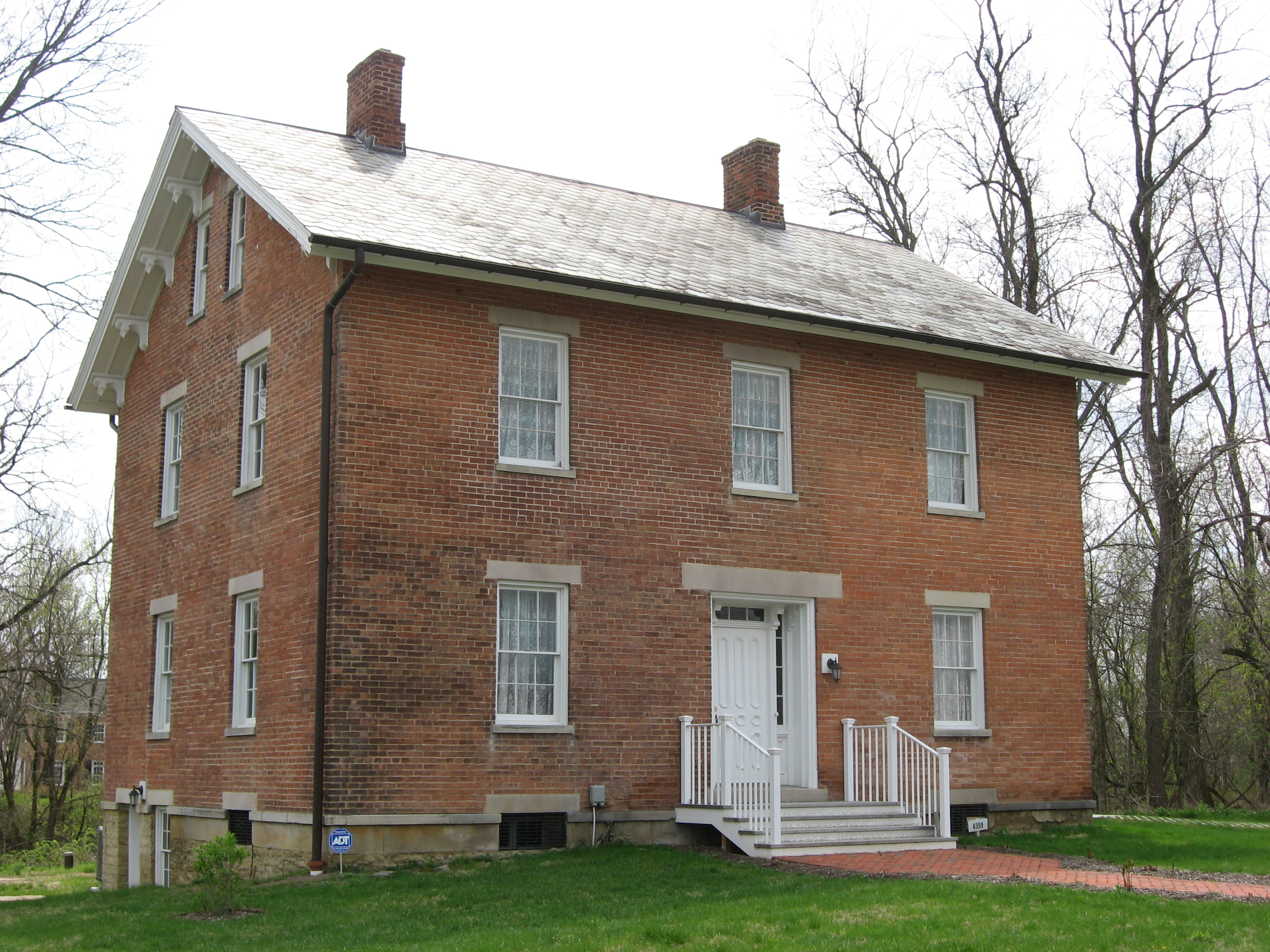
- Front of the house
- Location: 6359 Dublin-Granville Road, New Albany, Ohio
- Coordinates: 40°4′56″N 82°49′11″W
- Area: 6 acres (2.4 ha)
- Built: 1860
- Built by: Schott, Beecher Brothers
- Architectural style: Mid 19th Century Revival
- NRHP reference No.: 08000626
- Added to NRHP: July 2, 2008

George and Christina Ealy House is a house in New Albany, Ohio, in Franklin County, Ohio northeast of Columbus, which is listed on the U.S. National Register of Historic Places (NRHP). The listing also includes William H. Resch Park. It was listed on the NRHP in 2008.

The Ealy's operated a sawmill that helped them establish a good fortune. George Ealy built (or arranged to have built) this house in brick, and "recorded the year of the house's construction, 1860, in his own hand in the attic. He also listed the names of the 'work hands' who built the house. They include, as masons, a father and son named Schott, and two Beecher brothers as master carpenters. The Schotts were a German family who moved from Columbus to Plain Township in 1850. The Beechers came from Connecticut and settled in New Albany about the year the town was laid out, in 1837."

Ownership of the house was obtained by the New Albany-Plain Township Historical Society in 2004. The house is often still used for events like Art Shows and tours.

It is a two-story, three-by-two-bay brick house with its floor plan about 36 by 22 feet (11.0 m × 6.7 m). It has a side-gabled slate roof and stands on a foundation of quarried sand and limestone.
