= Barry Serafin (golf course architect) =

American golf course architect

Barry Serafin is an American golf course architect from New Albany, Ohio, working in Ohio and surrounding states. Serafin has been designing courses since 1987. Of the several dozen courses he has designed, ten have been listed in the Golf Digest list of "Places to Play".

== Courses ==
The Players Club at Foxfire in Columbus, to which he added nine holes, is rated among the 201 Best Places To Play in North America. Golf Digest also selected Serafin's New Albany Links course as one of its Top-10 Best New Affordable Public Golf Courses for 2001.

Golf Digest's ratings of Ohio golf courses list 2 Serafin-designed courses (Chapel Hill in Mount Vernon, and The Links at Echo Springs in Johnstown) among 21 in the state with a rating of 4.5 stars out of 5.0, the highest in Ohio. There are also 4 Serafin-designed courses (Black Diamond in Millersburg, New Albany Links in New Albany, Reserve Run in Poland, and Foxfire in Lockbourne) among 61 in the state with a Golf Digest rating of 4.0 stars out of 5.0.

Four of the 37 courses that BestCourses.com selected for their Best Golf Courses in America list of Ohio courses (out of 641 Ohio courses total) were designed by Serafin.

Additionally, GolfWeek rates Black Diamond (Millersburg) as the 3rd-best public access course in the state of Ohio.

== Current and Ongoing Projects ==
Triple Crown Country Club, Union, Kentucky
Working with PGA tour player Steve Flesch on bunker renovation.

Worthington Hills Country Club, Worthington, Ohio
Master plan and renovation of entire course.

== Completed Project List ==
Major course design and renovation projects completed by Serafin (plus design awards):

The Players Club at Foxfire, Columbus, Ohio
Golf Digest Places To Play
Golf Digest The 201 Best Places to Play in North America
GolfStyles Ohio 100 Must-Play Courses of Ohio
BestCourses.com Best Golf Courses in America

Liberty Hills Golf Club, Bellefontaine, Ohio
Golf Digest Places To Play

Bucyrus Country Club, Bucyrus, Ohio

Memorial Park Golf Course, Kenton, Ohio

Echo Hills Golf Course, Piqua, Ohio

Elks Golf Club, Wilmington, Ohio
Golf Digest Places To Play

Chapel Hill Golf Course, Bangs, Ohio
Golf Digest Places To Play
GolfStyles Ohio 100 Must-Play Courses of Ohio

The Links at Echo Springs, Johnstown, Ohio
Golf Digest Places To Play
GolfStyles Ohio 100 Must-Play Courses of Ohio
BestCourses.com Best Golf Courses in America

Mount Vernon Country Club, Mount Vernon, Ohio

Red Oaks Golf Course, Bloomingdale, Ohio

Kyber Run Golf Course, Johnstown, Ohio

Widow's Watch Golf Course, Lexington, Kentucky
1999 Lexington Open - TearDrop Golf Tour
Golf Digest Places To Play

Reserve Run Golf Course, Boardman, Ohio
Golf Digest Places To Play
GolfStyles Ohio 100 Must-Play Courses of Ohio

New Albany Links, New Albany, Ohio
2001 Golf Digest Best New Affordable Golf Course
Golf Digest Places To Play
Midwest Collegiate Amateur Series
Golf Styles Ohio 100 Must-Play Courses of Ohio
BestCourses.com Best Golf Courses in America

Black Diamond Golf Course, Millersburg, Ohio
Golf Digest Places To Play
GolfStyles Ohio 100 Must-Play Courses of Ohio
GolfWeek Magazine Best Course You Can Play
BestCourses.com Best Golf Courses in America

Majestic Springs Golf Course, Wilmington, Ohio
Golf Digest Places To Play
GolfStyles Ohio 100 Must-Play Courses of Ohio

Lakeland Golf Course, St. Paris, Ohio

Ohio University Golf Course, Athens, Ohio

Scioto Reserve Golf & Athletic Club, Columbus, Ohio
Mid-Ohio Golfer Best New Private Club
