= She Ain't You (New Hollow song) =

Single by New Hollow
- Released: July 3, 2013
- Recorded: Sonic Lounge Studios (Grove City, Ohio)
- Length: 3:30 (Single version)
- Label: 614/Black Magnetic/Epic
- Songwriters: Evan West; Mookie Clouse; Chad Blashford
- Producers: Michael J. Clouse & Joe Viers

New Hollow singles chronology
| "Airplanes" (2011) | "She Ain't You" (2013) | "Why Don't You Love Me" (2015) |

"She Ain't You" is a song by American recording artist/band New Hollow. The song was written and performed by the members of New Hollow, and was produced by Michael J. Clouse and Joe Viers. It initially debuted on Hot AC radio in the United States as an independent release on Monkee Hollow Records.

On July 3, 2013, "She Ain't You" began getting airplay on SiriusXM radio.

In December 2013, "She Ain't You" was voted the "Breakthrough Song Of 2013" by The Pulse (Sirius XM), beating out "Let Her Go" by Passenger (singer), "Best Day of My Life" by American Authors and "Say Something" by A Great Big World.

On January 1, 2014, "She Ain't You" was voted the No. 18 song of year on The Pulse (Sirius XM) "Top 30 Countdown Of 2013".

On January 24, 2014, New Hollow signed a multi-album recording contract with LA Reid and Epic Records.

"She Ain't You" was re-released and charted on both the Mediabase Top 40 and Hot AC charts. It reached number 28 on the US Hot AC chart and number 31 on the US Mainstream Top 40 chart.

The accompanying music video was directed by Tim Kirkman and features the band performing in an indoor, dark setting.

== Background and composition ==
"She Ain't You" was written and performed entirely by New Hollow. The song was brought to the band by Evan West when he was 17 years old. It was originally recorded and mixed at Sonic Lounge Studios in Grove City, Ohio by Michael J. Clouse and Joe Viers in 2012. Before releasing to radio in 2013, the band added additional background harmony vocals on the outro, Clouse & Viers remixed and the single was mastered at Magic Garden Mastering by Brian Lucey

== Credits and personnel ==
- Evan West – lead vocals, songwriter, guitarist, bass
- Mookie Clouse – vocals, songwriter, guitarist
- Chad Blashford – vocals, songwriter, percussion
- Recorded at Sonic Lounge Studios in Grove City, Ohio
- Michael J. Clouse – producer, audio mixing
- Joe (Uncle Scoopy) Viers – producer, audio mixing
- Brian Lucey – Mastering Engineer
- Chris L. Theodore – 614 Management
- Anthony A. Little – Monkee Hollow Records

== Chart performance ==
| Chart (2014) | Peak position |
|---|---|
| US Adult Pop Airplay (Billboard) | 31 |
