= Craig McCarthy =

American lawyer

Craig A. McCarthy
- Born: August 13, 1967 (age 59); New Jersey, U.S.
- Education: United States Military Academy (BS); Florida State University (JD)
- Occupation: Judge
- Employer: Ninth Judicial Circuit Court of Florida
- Political party: Republican
- Children: 2
- Awards: Army of Occupation Medal; Army Commendation Medal; Parachutist Badge
- Website: http://www.craigmccarthylaw.com/ http://craigmccarthy.com/

Craig Alan McCarthy (born August 13, 1967) is a judge, lawyer, and politician from Florida. He moved to Florida in 1979, and graduated from the United States Military Academy in 1989, serving as a member of the Berlin Brigade until returning to the United States to attend law school at Florida State University College of Law. He has practiced many areas of law, eventually opening his own practice for primarily dependency law. He has been an attorney on multiple cases that have gained both national and international attention, including the Rifqa Bary case and the Sharlyn Singh case. He was elected to the Ochlockonee River Soil and Water Conservation District and ran for the Florida House of Representatives out of District 36 as a Republican. On June 1, 2021, he was appointed a general magistrate of the Ninth Judicial Circuit Court of Florida. On July 11, 2022, McCarthy was appointed to the bench as a Florida circuit court judge.

== Life ==
=== Early life ===
McCarthy was born in New Jersey and moved to Brevard County, Florida with his family in 1979 at the age of eleven. McCarthy attended Satellite High School, where he served as student body president; he graduated in 1985.

=== Military service ===
McCarthy attended the United States Military Academy on the nomination of United States Senator Paula Hawkins and then-Congressman Bill Nelson, graduating in 1989. After graduation, McCarthy became a commissioned officer in the United States Army, serving as a field artillery officer at Fort Sill in Oklahoma. Following this appointment, McCarthy was deployed overseas as a member of the Berlin Brigade. In Berlin, he was the youngest battalion staff level fire support officer in the United States military. Following the end of the Cold War, the Army reduced its personnel by pushing for 26,000 officers and non-commissioned officers to leave active service. McCarthy participated in this program, leaving active military service in 1992. He would later return to service as a member of the United States Army Reserve.

== Legal career ==
McCarthy received his Juris Doctor from Florida State University College of Law. He began practicing law in Florida in 1995; his career has covered multiple areas of law. Following graduation from law school, McCarthy began his career as a legal aid in Central Florida. Afterward, he worked in medical license regulation for the state of Florida, and then in employment and civil rights law.

Moving to Orlando in 2001, McCarthy worked for the Florida Department of Children and Families, before opening a private firm, where he practices juvenile and dependency law and as an attorney ad litem for children in lock-down mental facilities.

=== Sharlyn Singh case ===
In 2007, an Orlando women was accused of putting her 11-month-old baby in an oven. McCarthy was appointed to the case, and eventually got the dependency case dropped, and the child reunified with the mother.

=== Rifqa Bary case ===
McCarthy served as a lawyer for Aysha Bary for a good part of the Rifqa Bary case. He claimed that Rifqa Bary was not being taught the faith correctly, and that the dependency case had become a "television event". He further argued that neither of the Barys had ever threatened their daughter.

McCarthy moved to have the case moved back to Ohio, which it eventually was. He also alleged that the girl's story of travel to Florida had "holes in it". He criticized Governor Charlie Crist for commenting on the case, referring to the statements as inappropriate for someone who was the boss of attorneys on both sides of the case. He compared the Crist comments to the general politicization he saw in the case. Arguing against Christian versus Muslim sentiments in the case, McCarthy tried to dispel the perception that the parents were fundamentalists. He never billed the state for his work.

== Political career ==
McCarthy successfully ran for and served on the board of the Ochlockonee River Soil and Water Conservation District while living in Leon County, Florida. He ran for the Florida House of Representatives out of District 36, against incumbent Scott Randolph, receiving early support from Conservatives. He, along with local Tea Party leaders and politicians, drove in a caravan to Arizona to support its immigration law, claiming selective immigration enforcement is uncompassionate and causes people to live in fear, and that the federal government has failed in its duties to protect the people of Arizona. McCarthy lost the race to Greg Reynolds in the Republican primary.

== Judicial career ==
On June 1, 2021, McCarthy was appointed a general magistrate of the Ninth Judicial Circuit Court of Florida. On July 11, 2022, McCarthy was appointed to the bench as a Florida circuit court judge to fill the vacancy left by Judge Bob LeBlanc.
