= New Albany Community Foundation =

The New Albany Community Foundation is a 501(c)(3) nonprofit organization based in New Albany, Ohio. Launched in 1995, the Foundation and its partners have raised funds for investments in the New Albany Community such as the New Albany Branch of the Columbus Metropolitan Library, the Jeanne B. McCoy Community Center for the Arts, the Philip Heit Center for Healthy New Albany, and Rose Run Park, among others.

== History ==
The New Albany Community Foundation was created by Jack Kessler, co-founder and chairman of the New Albany Company, and Ralph Johnson, the former superintendent of the local school district. The foundation was incorporated in the State of Ohio in 1994 and commenced operations in 1995 as a 501(c)(3) tax-exempt nonprofit organization. The foundation is a component fund of the Columbus Foundation.

In 2002, the foundation started the "Remarkable Evening" fundraising event, which became their biggest annual fundraiser.

As of 2021, the foundation had more than 70 endowment funds established by families and companies.

== Impact and major initiatives ==
As of 2021, the New Albany Community Foundation has awarded more than $20 million in grants to community nonprofit and school organizations to support education, the arts, health and wellness, and environmental sustainability and historic preservation. The New Albany Community Foundation has been called "instrumental to the success of this community" and "part of making the community a vibrant and great place to live" by CityScene Magazine and Healthy New Albany.

The foundation’s major initiatives include raising funds and community support to establish and endow the New Albany branch library, the Jeanne B. McCoy Community Center for the Arts, the New Albany Lecture Series, Healthy New Albany, Safety Town, a student lecture series, an author residency program for the public school district, and the Charleen & Charles Hinson Amphitheater. Keynote speakers including Bill Clinton, Tony Blair, Colin Powell, Condoleezza Rice, David McCullough, Doris Kearns Goodwin, John Irving, Wendy Wasserstein, Jennifer Doudna, and Walter Isaacson have headlined the Foundation's largest annual fundraiser, titled "Remarkable Evening".

=== New Albany Branch Library ===
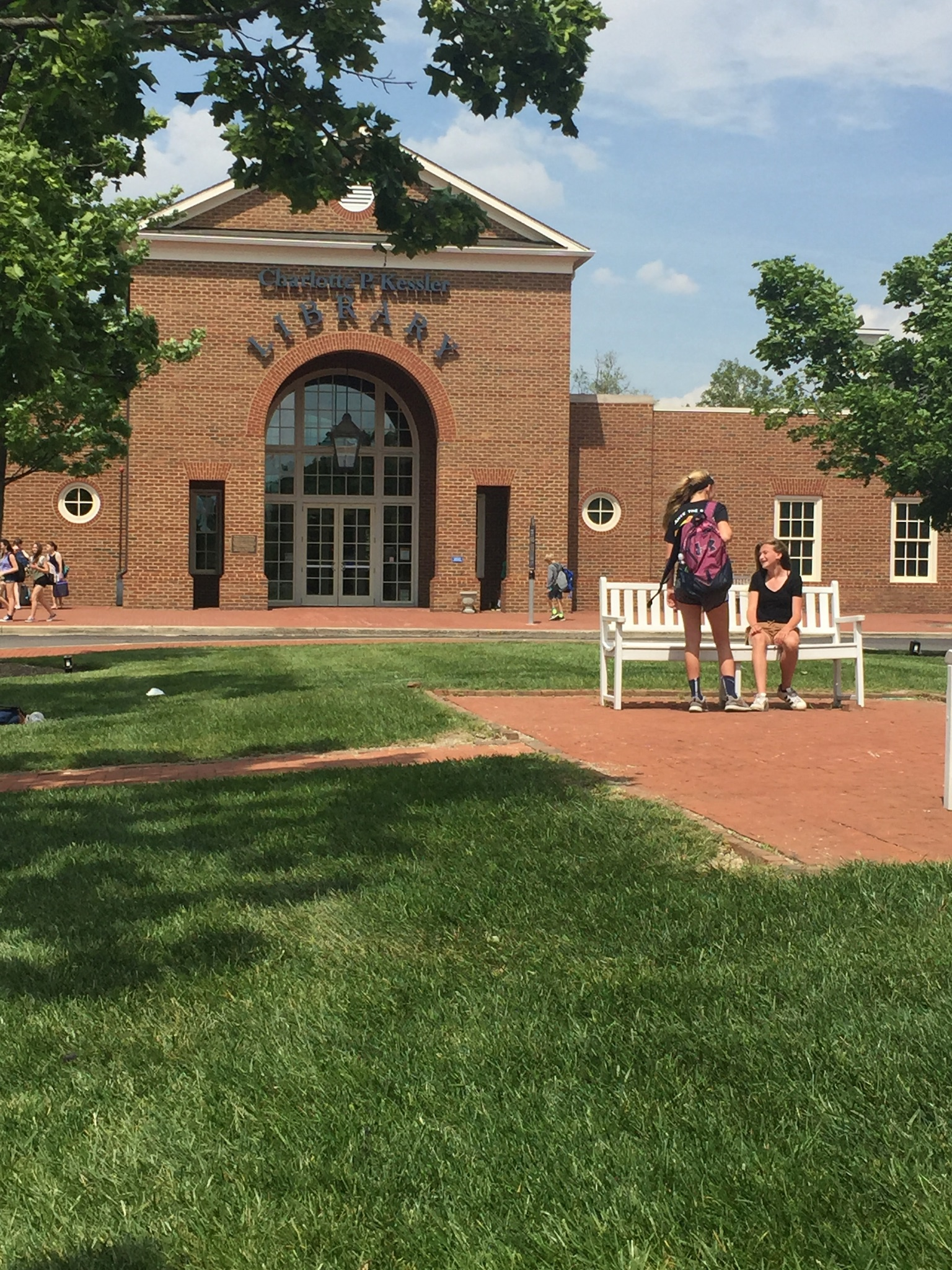
New Albany Branch Library at Market Square in New Albany, Ohio.

The New Albany Community Foundation’s first major accomplishment was raising $1.2 million in 2002 to support the establishment of a local New Albany branch of the Columbus Metropolitan Library. The fundraising effort was catalyzed when historian David McCullough headlined the foundation’s first annual Remarkable Evening benefit, hosted by local residents and philanthropists Abigail and Leslie Wexner, in the fall of 2002. The new public library opened in New Albany's Market Square in 2003. In the following year, the number of annual visits increased from 36,707 in the old location within the local high school to 158,429 visits in the new building. The branch was later named in honor of Charlotte P. Kessler, a library benefactor and advocate. In 2020, a new library garden for readings and events was opened as an extension of the city’s public Rose Run Park.

=== Jeanne B. McCoy Community Center for the Arts ===
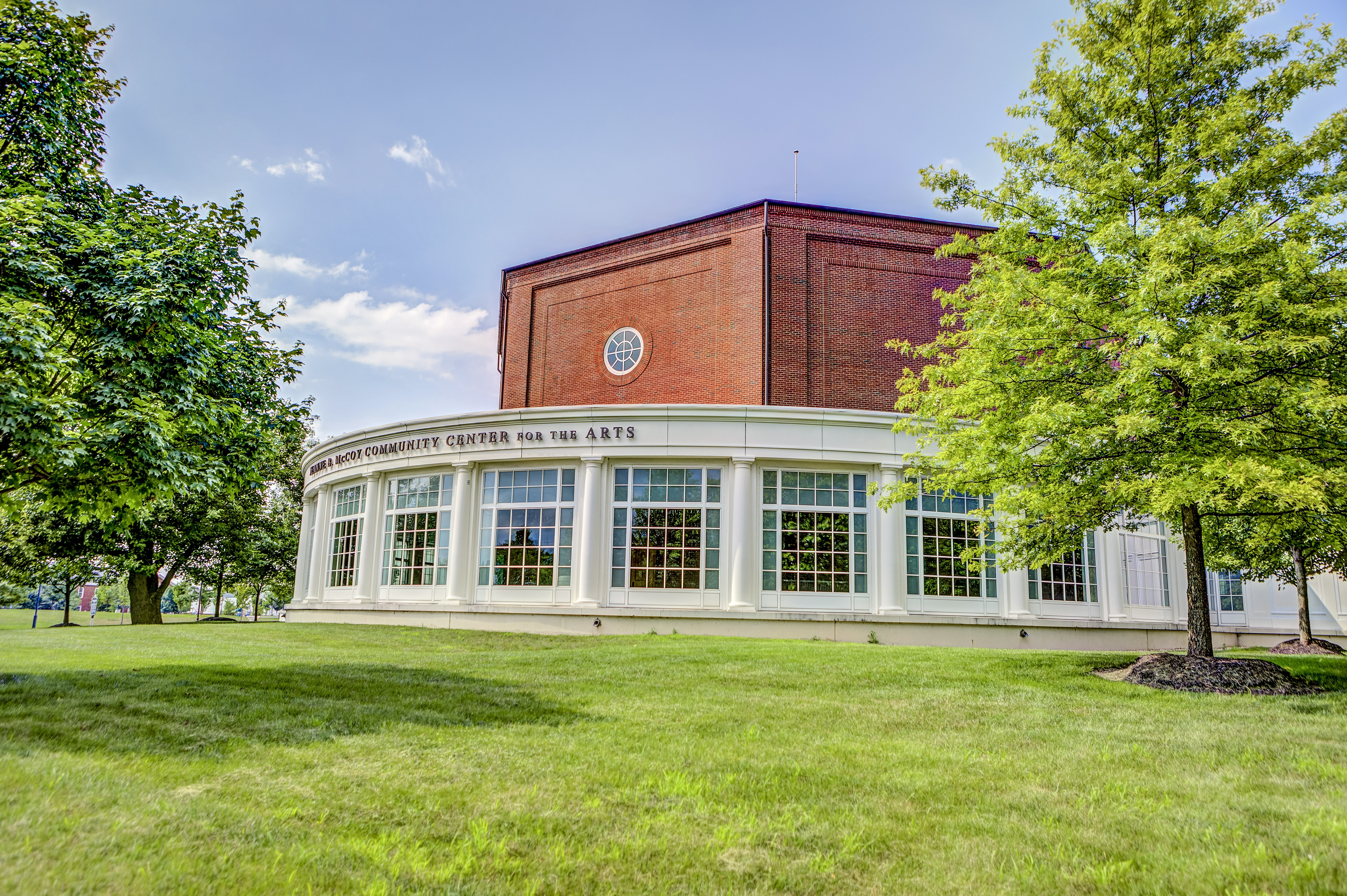
The Jeanne B. McCoy Community Center for the Arts in New Albany, Ohio

In 2004, the Foundation led the effort to build and endow a performing arts center in New Albany’s historic village center, the Jeanne B. McCoy Community Center for the Arts, adjacent to the public school campus. The Foundation united the village and township governments, the school district, the community authority, and private benefactors, to create an arts venue serving both the schools and the community. Playwright Wendy Wasserstein spoke at a 2004 fundraiser that raised $2.23 million for the future arts center. Moved by the community’s commitment to arts and education, Wasserstein said, "This is extraordinary… There is nothing like creating the strength of a community. It’s the most humane thing you can do." The $13 million Jeanne B. McCoy Community Center for the Arts, known as "The McCoy," opened in 2008. The center presents hundreds of events and performances annually, and is home to the 100-member New Albany Symphony Orchestra. In 2019, The McCoy hosted a total of 374 events and welcomed 102,401 attendees, counting both students and community members. The Foundation also established The McCoy's $7 million endowment.

=== Healthy New Albany ===
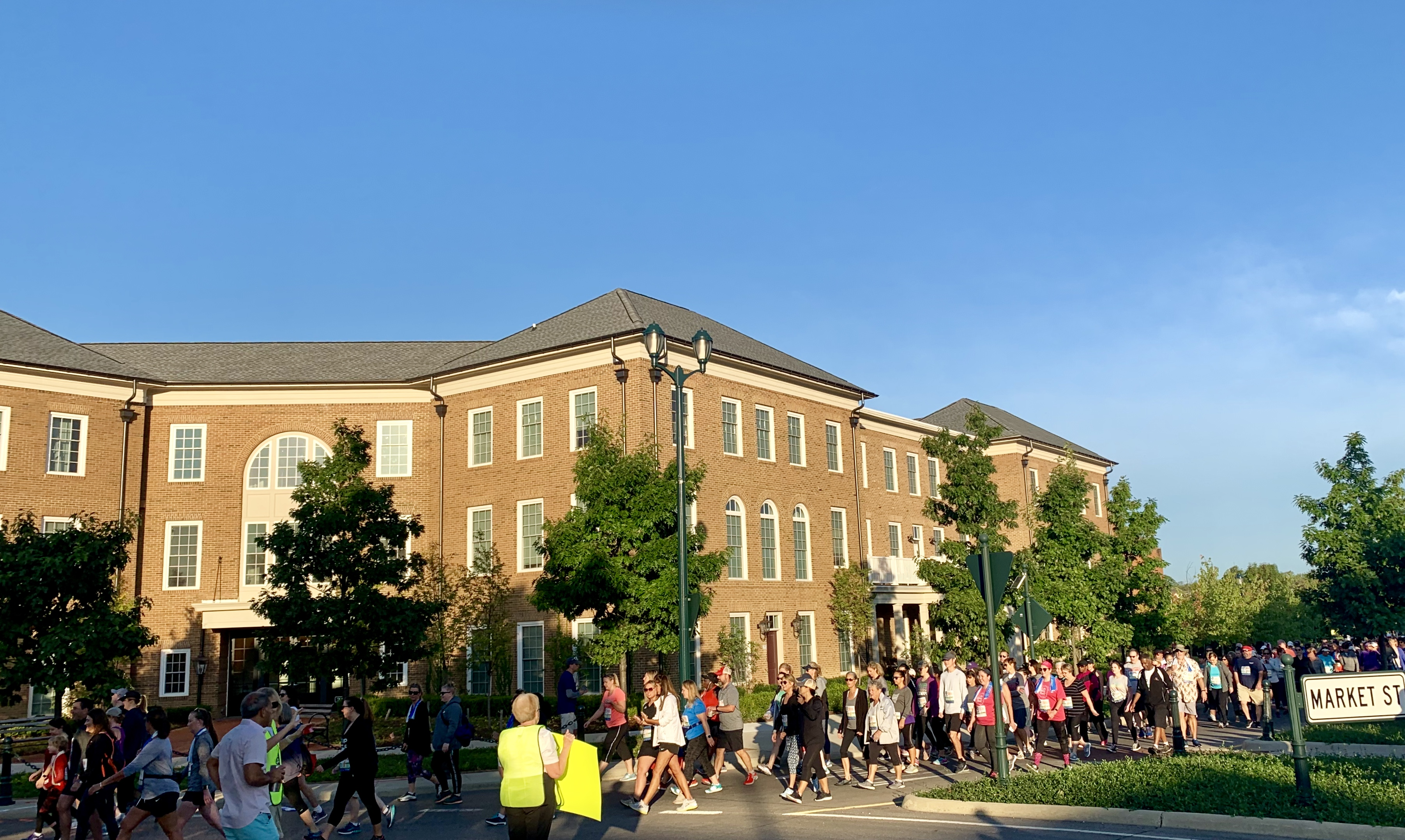
New Albany Walking Classic in New Albany, Ohio, in 2019.

The New Albany Community Foundation helps raise funds to support Healthy New Albany, a 501(c)(3) nonprofit organization that promotes healthy living through community activities and individual wellness and disease prevention. Healthy New Albany grew out of a nationally renowned 10K annual walking event, the New Albany Walking Classic, initiated in 2005 by public health advocate Philip Heit. In 2015, Healthy New Albany expanded its community programming with the opening of The Philip Heit Center for Healthy New Albany, a mixed-use facility in New Albany’s village center that houses a state-of-the-art fitness center and primary care, sports medicine and physical therapy services, along with community engagement classes, lectures and events. The Heit Center was described by the Columbus Dispatch as "a 55,000-square-foot space where someone can jog on a treadmill, visit a doctor about a nagging cough, throw a wedding shower and meet up with friends for a game of mah-jongg." Healthy New Albany also organizes a local food pantry, farmers market, and community garden.

Mental health and overall well-being are part of the Foundation’s focus on health. The Foundation has invited mental-health advocates and experts to speak for annual lecture events and the New Albany-Plain Local School District launched a community-oriented Well-Being Initiative for students. According to New Albany schools superintendent Michael Sawyers, the health and wellness programming "is just as valuable as the arts and culture and environmental work that originally started out of the Foundation 25 years ago." A local nonprofit organization, the Well-Being Connection, works in collaboration with the Well-Being Initiative.

=== The New Albany Lecture Series ===
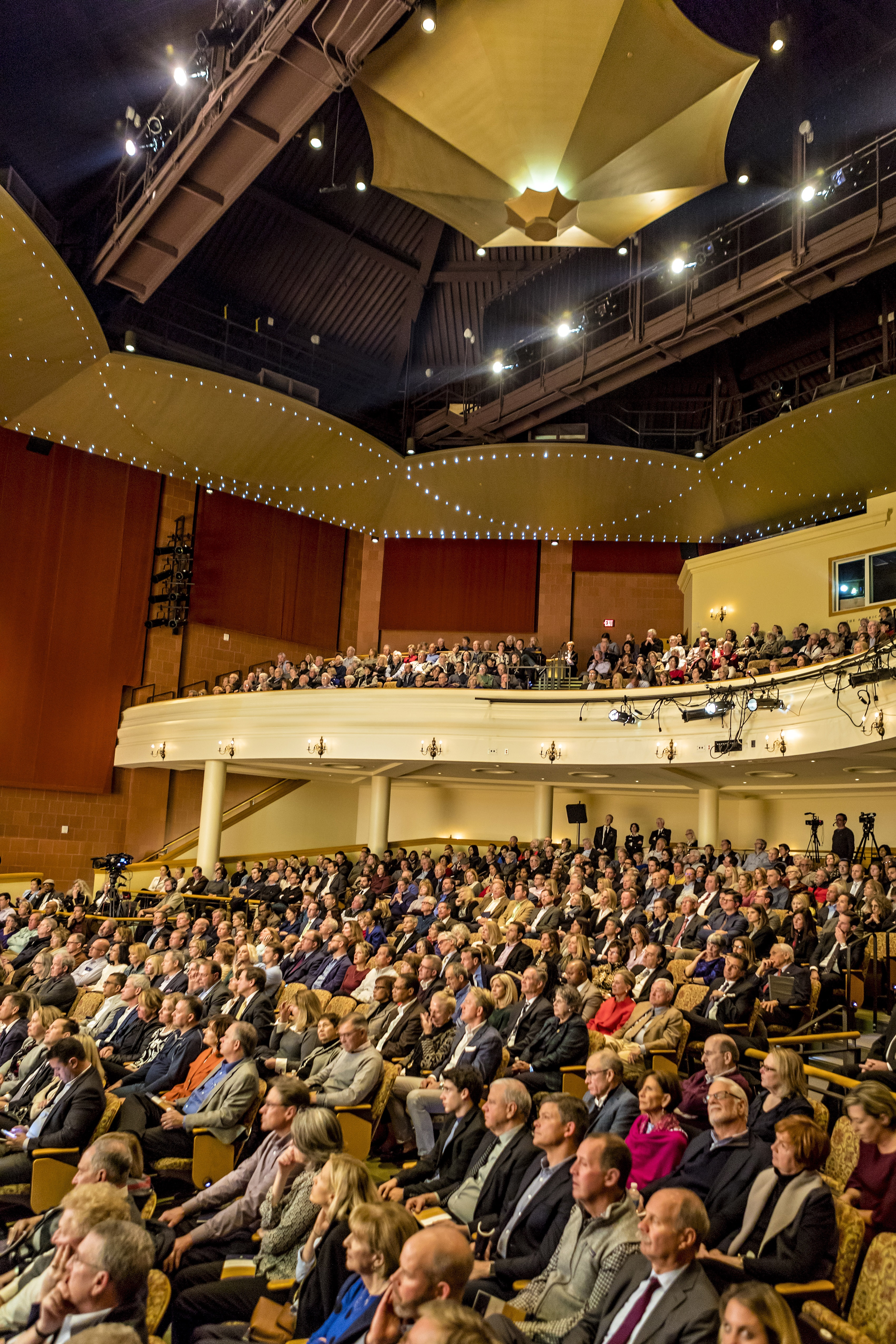
Jefferson Series 2018 event at the Jeanne B. McCoy Community Center for the Arts in New Albany, Ohio

Since 2013 the Foundation has presented The New Albany Lecture Series, an annual series of public lectures featuring leaders in global affairs, business, politics, mental health, and history. Past speakers include David McCullough, Condoleezza Rice, Doris Kearns Goodwin, Newt Gingrich, Valerie Jarrett, Mariel Hemingway, Dr. Sanjay Gupta, Samantha Power, Glenn Close, Gen. David Petraeus, Gen. Colin Powell, Patrick Kennedy, John Glenn, Fareed Zakaria, Jon Meacham, Ibram X. Kendi, Eddie S. Glaude Jr., Chris Christie, David Axelrod and others. The lectures are held at the Jeanne B. McCoy Community Center for the Arts in New Albany, and addressed to students from New Albany and across the region as well as the general public. In parallel with the lecture series, the New Albany Community Foundation also organizes a student lecture program that reached more than 13,000 students as of 2019.

=== Charleen & Charles Hinson Amphitheater ===
The New Albany Community Foundation organized the campaign to construct and operate a $7 million open-air theater, the Charleen & Charles Hinson Amphitheater. Inaugurated in 2021, the 800-seat amphitheater has hosted performances by Leslie Odom Jr. and local groups like the New Albany Symphony Orchestra and the New Albany Ballet Company. It is located adjacent to The McCoy performing arts center and Rose Run Park in the center of New Albany. Built with a combination of private and public funding, the amphitheater is located on land owned by the school district and leased to the city. In 2021 the Columbus Dispatch reported, "As some arts patrons are likely to remain more comfortable in outdoor venues than indoor ones because of the pandemic, the Hinson Amphitheater might be opening at just the right time." Programming is organized by the Columbus Association for the Performing Arts (CAPA). Designed by DLR Group, the amphitheater is "decked out in ivy and set against the backdrop of the newly developed Rose Run Park."

== Governance and leadership ==
The Foundation’s board of trustees includes 14 voting members, plus nonvoting members such as the mayor, school superintendent, school board president, township trustees, and co-founder Jack Kessler, the chairman of the New Albany Company. In 2002 Jack Kessler tasked Craig Mohre, now the Foundation’s president, with creating a long-term plan. Mohre oversaw the growth of the Foundation’s assets from $180,000 in 2003 to more than $15 million in 2019 with about 70 funds directed by philanthropic families and companies. In 2020 the Foundation's board established an inclusion advisory council.

== McCoy Service Award ==
In 2004 the New Albany Community Foundation established the annual Jeanne and John G. McCoy Community Service Award in honor of two civic leaders whose “exceptional generosity had a significant and lasting impact” on the community.

- 2004: Jeanne and John G. McCoy
- 2005: Janet Atwater
- 2006: Ralph Johnson
- 2007: Bill Resch
- 2008: Donald Cameron
- 2009: Philip Heit
- 2010: The Ryan Family
- 2011: Tiney McComb
- 2012: Robert H. Schottenstein
- 2013: John W. Kessler
- 2014: Jackie and Ken Krebs
- 2015: Jennie and Mark Wilson
- 2016: Cindy and Keith Berend
- 2017: Barbara and Al Siemer
- 2018: Leslie H. Wexner
- 2019: Melanie and Michael DeAscentis
- 2020: Angela Douglas
- 2021: Patti and Steve Steinour
