= Michael J. Clouse =

American record producer and songwriter

Michael J. Clouse (sometimes credited as Michael J. Clouse III), an American record producer and songwriter was born in Boston, Massachusetts.

Clouse graduated from Framingham North High School in Framingham, Massachusetts, and later earned a degree from the American College of Greece, where he also played basketball. His time in Europe exposed him to a range of musical styles, which later influenced his production work.

He began his music career in Los Angeles in the mid-1980s, collaborating with a wide range of artists, including the late Jeff Buckley, David Morgan (The Association, Three Dog Night), Marco Mendoza (Ted Nugent, Thin Lizzy, The Dead Daisies), Nicky Hopkins (The Rolling Stones, The Beatles, The Who), Shawn Lee (Monkeyboy), Jamie Carter (Jon Butcher (band)), Carl Young (Michael Franti & Spearhead (band)), Blues Traveler (band), seminal LA band The Coma-Tones (band) and rock/pop New Hollow (band).

In the early 1990s, Clouse expanded into film and television, working as a music supervisor and songwriter. He relocated to New York City in the mid-1990s, where he opened a recording studio on West 26th Street. There, he continued working with Jeff Buckley and other emerging artists, while also taking on projects in film scoring and supervision.

Following Buckley's passing in 1997, Clouse contributed to several posthumous releases from the Jeff Buckley Estate, including Sketches for My Sweetheart the Drunk. He collaborated with Chris Cornell, Buckley’s mother, and members of Buckley’s band during the process.

Throughout his career, Clouse has written and produced music featured in various film and television projects, maintaining a presence across both the music and visual media industries.

As of 2025, Clouse resides in Nashville, Tennessee, with his wife, Terri Clouse.

== Selected albums ==
(as Producer, Engineer, Mix Engineer, and/or Songwriter)

Year	Title	Release date
1992	No One Believes Me - Dingo Dr. Giggles (Soundtrack album)	Universal 1992
1994	Quo (album)|Quo	MJJ Records, 1994
1998	Sketches for My Sweetheart the Drunk - Jeff Buckley	Columbia May 26, 1998
2000	My Muse The Monkey - Sandy Bell	GSI Records, 2000
2000	Monkey Boy - Shawn Lee (musician)	July, 2000
2001	Live at L'Olympia - Jeff Buckley	Columbia July 3, 2001
2002	Songs to No One 1991-1992, - Jeff Buckley	Columbia October 15, 2002
2004	(Legacy Edition) - Jeff Buckley	Columbia August 24, 2004
2005	The Good Daughter - Sandy Bell	Storm UK, 2005
2007	So Real: Songs From Jeff Buckley - Jeff Buckley	Columbia May 22, 2007
2008	Live For Tomorrow - Marco Mendoza	Frontier 2008
2010	SiCK	Monkee Hollow Nov.1, 2010
2011	Boyfriend - New Hollow	Monkee Hollow Jan. 23, 2011
2011	Airplanes - New Hollow	Monkee Hollow May 23, 2011
2013	She Ain't You - New Hollow	Monkee Hollow / 614 Music July 3, 2013
2014	She Ain't You - New Hollow	614/ Black Magnetic/Epic Feb 23, 2014
2015	Jiffy Jane - New Hollow	614/ Black Magnetic/Epic Mar 20, 2015
2015	Jackie's Baby - Blues Traveler w/ New Hollow	Loud & Proud April 7, 2015
2015	Why Don't You Love Me - New Hollow	614/ Bee & El/SME July 8, 2015
2016	Popstar (Is This What The Girls Like?) - New Hollow	614/ Bee & El/SME June 10, 2016
2017	Pocket Change - Mookie & Evan	614 Records October 27, 2017

== Documentaries ==
- (appeared in as Michael J. Clouse III)
- Goodbye and Hello (2000) from Netherlands TV
- Fall in Light (1999) from French TV
