= New Albany, Ohio =

City in Franklin and Licking Counties, Ohio, US

- City
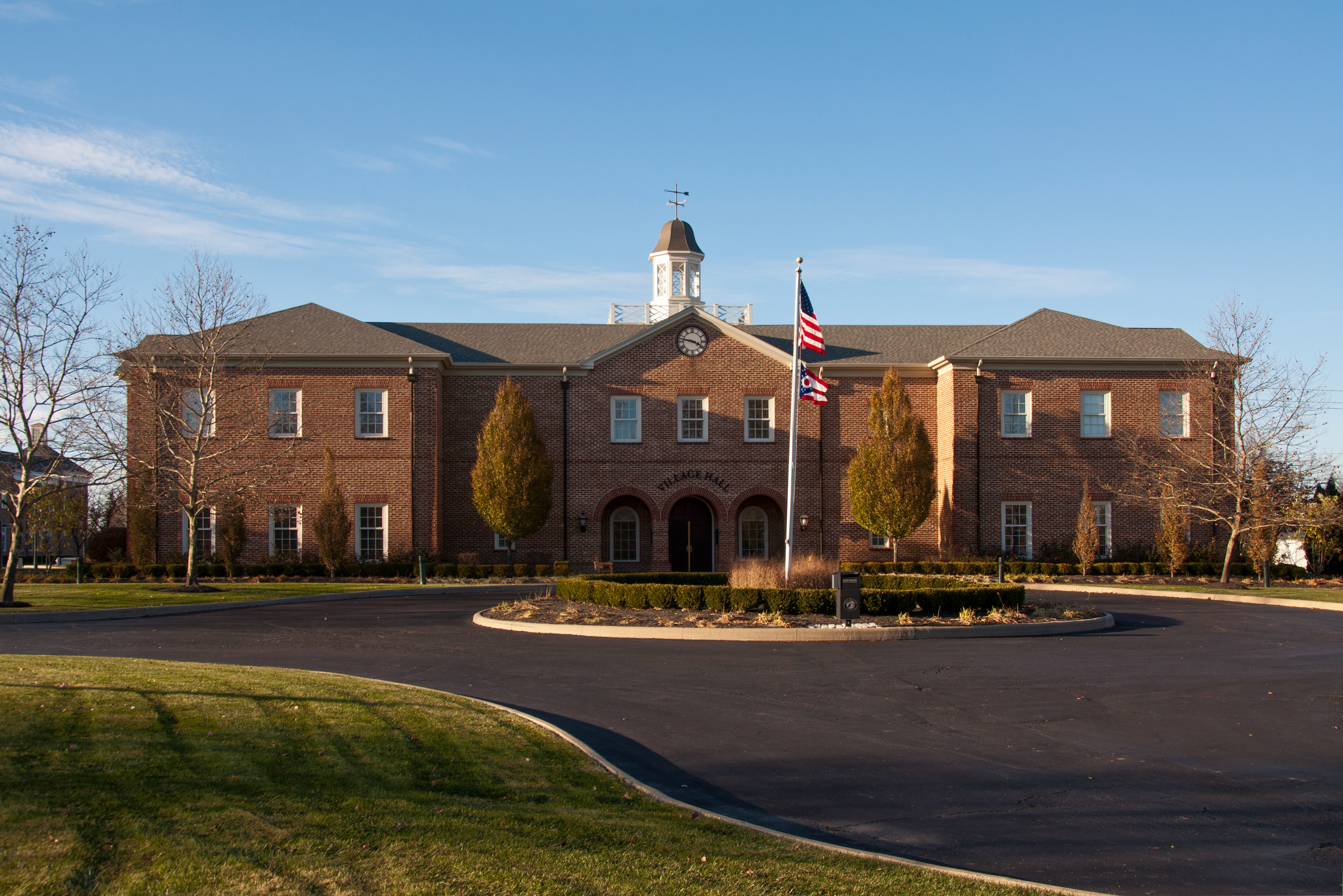
- New Albany Village Hall

- Flag Seal Logo
- Interactive map of New Albany, Ohio
- Location within Ohio Location within the United States
- Coordinates: 40°04′58″N 82°48′32″W
- Country: United States
- State: Ohio
- Counties: Franklin, Licking

Area
  - Total: 16.82 sq mi (43.57 km^{2})
  - Land: 16.65 sq mi (43.13 km^{2})
  - Water: 0.17 sq mi (0.44 km^{2})
- Elevation: 1,053 ft (321 m)

Population (2020)
  - Total: 10,825
  - Density: 650.0/sq mi (250.98/km^{2})
- Time zone: UTC-5 (Eastern (EST))
  - Summer (DST): UTC-4 (EDT)
- ZIP code: 43054
- Area codes: 614, 380
- FIPS code: 39-53970
- GNIS feature ID: 2399449
- Website: www.newalbanyohio.org

New Albany is a city in the U.S. state of Ohio. It is located 15 miles (24 km) northeast of the state capital, Columbus. Most of the city is located in Franklin County and a small portion extends into adjacent Licking County. New Albany had a population of 10,825 at the 2020 census.

Founded in 1837, it was a small town in the Columbus metropolitan area, until businessman Les Wexner invested significantly in the town during the 1990s, which led to rapid population and business growth in the succeeding decades.

== History ==
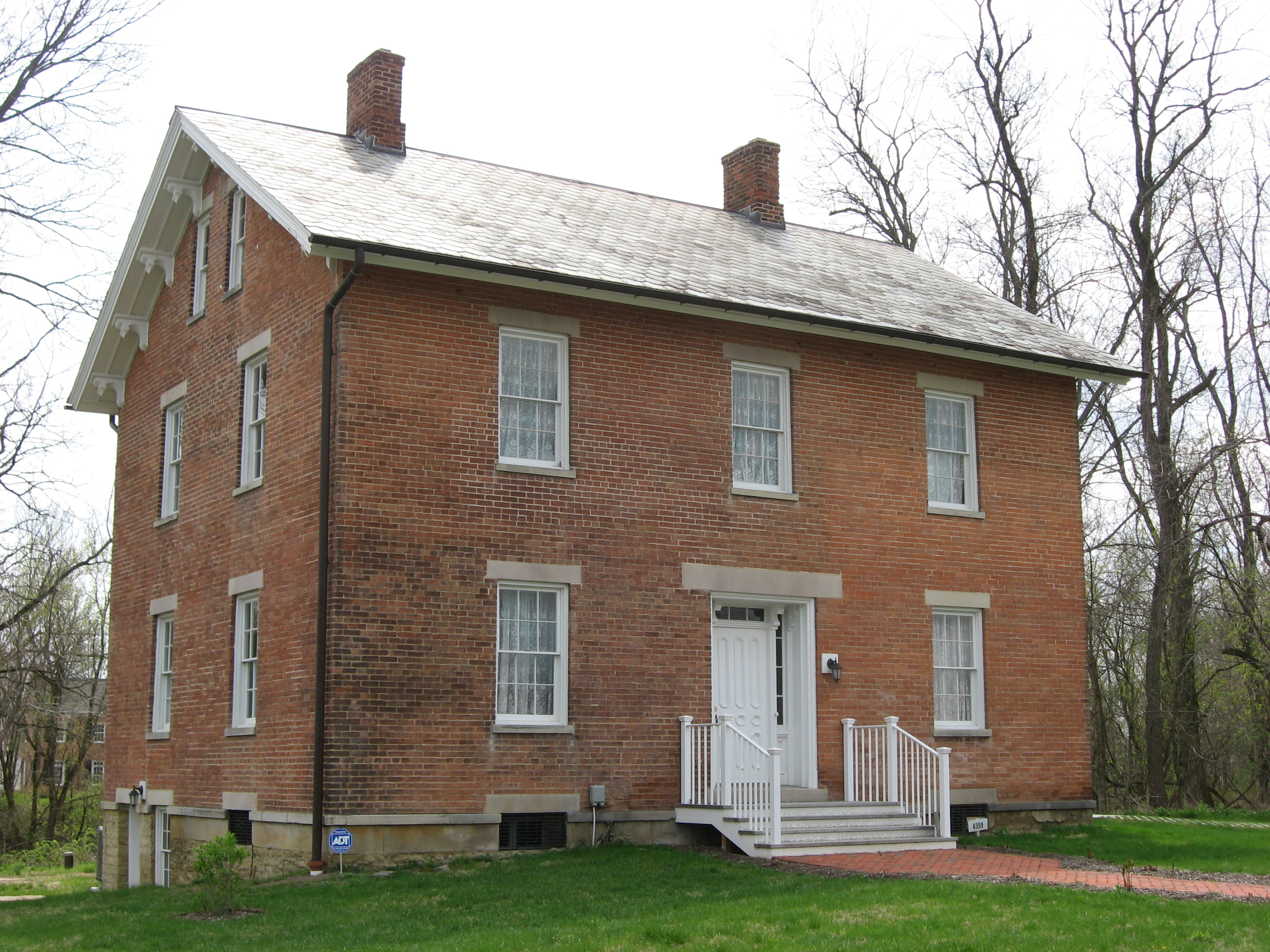
The George and Christina Ealy House, a historic site in the city

The land of New Albany was founded in the center of Plain Township in 1837 by Nobel Landon and William Yantis. The land was split into lots measuring 50 ft (15 m) by 100 ft (30 m) and sold to new settlers. One theory about the name is that some of the original settlers migrated from the Albany, New York, area. Albany, Ohio was laid out in 1832, prior to the founding of New Albany. During its history, the community has also been known by the name of Hope.

In 1856, New Albany was incorporated with a population of 50, and S. Ogden was elected as the first mayor. Initially known as The Wilkins Lumber Mill, the New Albany Mill opened in 1881. The first female mayor of New Albany, Mrs. Edward Babbitt was elected in 1922.

In 1970, New Albany was much smaller, consisting of a small part of Plain Township that did not touch Columbus. The first annual New Albany Founders Day Celebration was held in 1976. As late as 1980, the census only listed 414 residents in the village. Rapid growth in New Albany began in the 1990s, partly due to the expansion of the Les Wexner clothing empire and Wexner's construction of his mansion (the second-largest in central Ohio behind the Longaberger mansion in the village). State Route 161 and access to 161 from I-270 was reconfigured around this time, allowing freeway access into and out of town.

In 2008, the New Albany Mill closed, 119 years after its downtown opening. The original sawmill had been converted to a hardware store and was a staple in the lives of many of the residents of New Albany.

The 2009 Rifqa Bary controversy occurred in New Albany after teenager Fathima Rifqa Bary ran away to Florida under a claimed threat of an honor killing by her family due to her conversion to Christianity from Islam.

== Geography ==
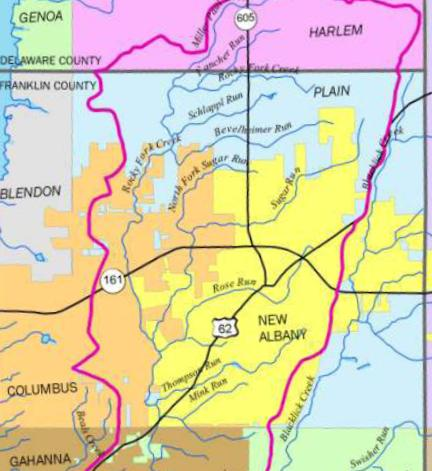
The course of the Rocky Fork Creek in New Albany (yellow) and Plain Township (blue), in the northeastern corner of Franklin County

New Albany is located in the northeastern Franklin County with a portion extending east into the Licking County. It is northeast of Columbus at an elevation of 1,024 feet (312 m).

According to the United States Census Bureau, the village has a total area of 15.4 square miles (39.8 km^{2}), of which 15.2 square miles (39.4 km^{2}) are land and 0.15 square miles (0.4 km^{2}), or 1.09%, are water.

New Albany is situated in the headwaters of the Rocky Fork, a tributary of Big Walnut Creek. The tributaries of Rocky Fork, Rose Run and Sugar Run, flow northeast to southwest throughout the city. Blacklick Creek flows through the eastern end of the city.

=== Neighborhoods ===
Three main roads intersect the city center: Dublin-Granville, U.S. Route 62/Johnstown Road, and New Albany-Reynoldsburg/Ohio Route 605/New Albany-Condit. These three roads divide the city into six roughly equal sections. In the southwest section is the New Albany Country Club, much of the club's golf course (designed by Jack Nicklaus), and Market Square. The south-central section contains the remainder of the golf course, with the rest mostly residential. The northwest section contains New Albany Schools and the performing arts center. The New Albany Links golf course (designed by Barry Serafin) and the surrounding neighborhoods are in the north-central section, along with Bevelhymer Park and the headquarters of Justice. Lastly, the northeast section contains the Mt. Carmel New Albany Surgical Hospital and the new headquarters of Bob Evans Farms, Inc.

The city is divided into many subdivisions. North of Dublin-Granville Road are: Asbury Ridge, Cedarbrook, Hampstead Green, Hampstead Heath, New Albany Links, Tidewater, Upper Clarenton, and Windsor. South are the neighborhoods of: Alban Mews, Ashberry Ridge, Brandon, Clivdon, Crescent, Edge of Woods, The Farms, Fenway, Hawksmoor, Keswick, Lambton Park, Lansdowne, North Of Woods, Planter's Grove, the Reserve, Tensweep, Upper Brandon, Waterston, and Wiveliscombe.

== Demographics ==
Historical population
Census	Pop.	Note	%±
1850	168		—
1860	115		−31.5%
1880	213		—
1890	223		4.7%
1900	224		0.4%
1910	215		−4.0%
1920	200		−7.0%
1930	215		7.5%
1940	221		2.8%
1950	268		21.3%
1960	307		14.6%
1970	513		67.1%
1980	409		−20.3%
1990	1,621		296.3%
2000	3,711		128.9%
2010	7,713		107.8%
2020	10,825		40.3%
US Census

Per the U.S. Census Bureau, 75.4% of New Albany residents over the age of 25 are college graduates, the median home value is $494,600 and the median household income is $203,194.

=== 2020 census ===
As of the 2020 census, New Albany had a population of 10,825. The median age was 39.1 years. 32.9% of residents were under the age of 18 and 9.0% of residents were 65 years of age or older. For every 100 females there were 99.7 males, and for every 100 females age 18 and over there were 97.1 males age 18 and over.

98.0% of residents lived in urban areas, while 2.0% lived in rural areas.

There were 3,381 households in New Albany, of which 55.3% had children under the age of 18 living in them. Of all households, 77.3% were married-couple households, 7.5% were households with a male householder and no spouse or partner present, and 12.9% were households with a female householder and no spouse or partner present. About 11.1% of all households were made up of individuals and 4.9% had someone living alone who was 65 years of age or older.

There were 3,573 housing units, of which 5.4% were vacant. The homeowner vacancy rate was 1.5% and the rental vacancy rate was 14.8%.

Racial composition as of the 2020 census
Race	Number	Percent
White	8,440	78.0%
Black or African American	525	4.8%
American Indian and Alaska Native	9	0.1%
Asian	1,042	9.6%
Native Hawaiian and Other Pacific Islander	3	0.0%
Some other race	93	0.9%
Two or more races	713	6.6%
Hispanic or Latino (of any race)	298	2.8%

=== 2010 census ===
As of the censusof 2010, there were 7,724 people, 2,406 households, and 2,138 families living in the village. The population density was 668.2 inhabitants per square mile (258.0/km^{2}). There were 2,653 housing units at an average density of 229.5 per square mile (88.6/km^{2}). The racial makeup of the village was 87.7% White, 3.1% African American, 0.1% Native American, 6.5% Asian, 0.1% Pacific Islander, 0.4% from other races, and 2.1% from two or more races. Hispanic or Latino of any race were 2.0% of the population.

There were 2,406 households, of which 58.9% had children under the age of 18 living with them, 80.6% were married couples living together, 5.5% had a female householder with no husband present, 2.7% had a male householder with no wife present, and 11.1% were non-families. 9.1% of all households were made up of individuals, and 2.8% had someone living alone who was 65 years of age or older. The average household size was 3.21 and the average family size was 3.43.

The median age in the village was 37.9 years. 36.6% of residents were under the age of 18; 3.9% were between the ages of 18 and 24; 24.8% were from 25 to 44; 28.3% were from 45 to 64; and 6.5% were 65 years of age or older. The gender makeup of the village was 49.6% male and 50.4% female.

=== 2000 census ===
As of the census of 2000, there were 3,711 people, 1,263 households, and 1,030 families living in the village. The population density was 415.7 inhabitants per square mile (160.5/km^{2}). There were 1,424 housing units at an average density of 159.5 per square mile (61.6/km^{2}). The racial makeup of the village was 94.18% White, 1.56% African American, 0.32% Native American, 2.75% Asian, 0.35% from other races, and 0.84% from two or more races. Hispanic or Latino of any race were 0.81% of the population.

There were 1,263 households, out of which 46.2% had children under the age of 18 living with them, 75.1% were married couples living together, 4.1% had a female householder with no husband present, and 18.4% were non-families. 15.6% of all households were made up of individuals, and 3.5% had someone living alone who was 65 years of age or older. The average household size was 2.94 and the average family size was 3.30.

In the village the population was spread out, with 33.1% under the age of 18, 4.2% from 18 to 24, 28.6% from 25 to 44, 26.6% from 45 to 64, and 7.5% who were 65 years of age or older. The median age was 38 years. For every 100 females, there were 98.0 males. For every 100 females age 18 and over, there were 97.1 males.

The median income for a household in the village was $102,180, and the median income for a family was $119,171. Males had a median income of $100,000 versus $36,563 for females. The per capita income for the village was $62,131. About 1.2% of families and 1.2% of the population were below the poverty line, including 0.5% of those under age 18 and none of those age 65 or over.

=== Religion ===
New Albany has a sizable Christian and Jewish population. New Albany is home to Temple Beth Shalom, the Columbus Jewish Day School, the Chabad Center for a Jewish Tomorrow, central Ohio's newest Jewish Community Center, Columbusjcc.org the Church of the Resurrection, Grace Life Church, New Albany Presbyterian Church, and Franklin Brethren Church, Jersey church.

== Economy ==
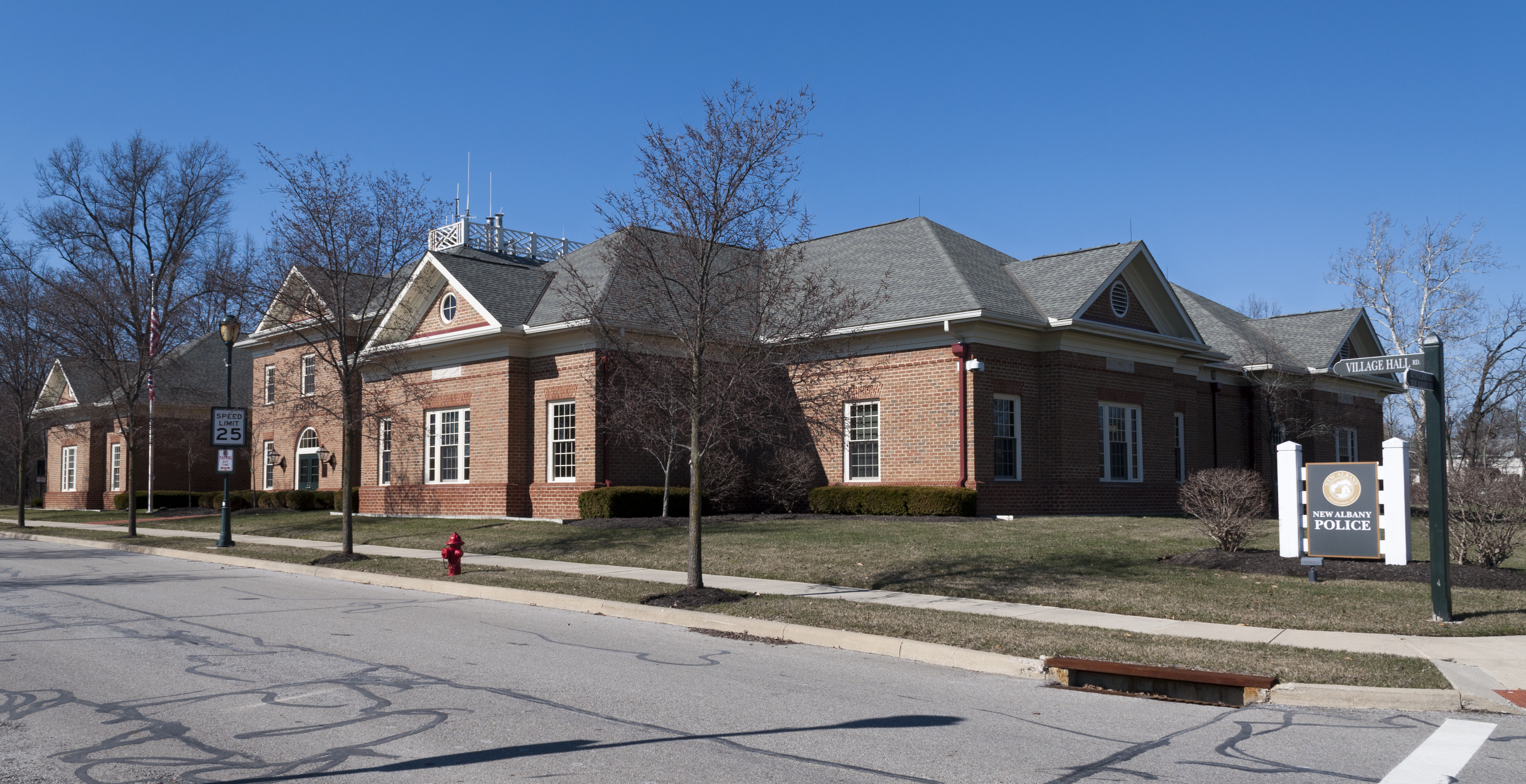
New Albany Police Headquarters

The New Albany Market Square is a popular community gathering place in the center of the city. It is home to many businesses and the New Albany Branch of the Columbus Metropolitan Library.

Notable companies headquartered in New Albany include Abercrombie & Fitch (part of the retail clothing conglomerate built by Les Wexner) and Commercial Vehicle Group. The former is the leading employer within the city boundaries.

In March 2011, Bob Evans Farms, Inc. announced plans to move its corporate headquarters, and almost 400 corporate employees, from the south side of Columbus to New Albany. Construction on the new headquarters was completed in 2013.

Other employers in the city include Aetna, American Electric Power, UBS, New Albany-Plain Local School District, and the Mount Carmel New Albany Surgical Hospital. Most of the large office buildings housing these employers lie in a corridor between Route 161 and Central College Road to the north.

In 2020, Facebook opened a data center in New Albany. Google has broken ground on its own data center. In January 2022, Intel announced plans to build the world's largest semiconductor fabrication plant on 926 acres of land that was approved to be annexed into New Albany. Construction began in September 2022, and is scheduled to be completed in late 2026 after being delayed from an original completion date of late 2025.

== Arts and culture ==
The New Albany community has shown strong support for the performing arts. Located in the city are the New Albany Symphony Orchestra and the New Albany Ballet Company. In 2002, the New Albany Community Foundation approached the Columbus Metropolitan Library (CML) to see if CML would build a library branch in New Albany if the Foundation would donate the book collections and computers. After a fundraising campaign, the library was built in the Market Square area.

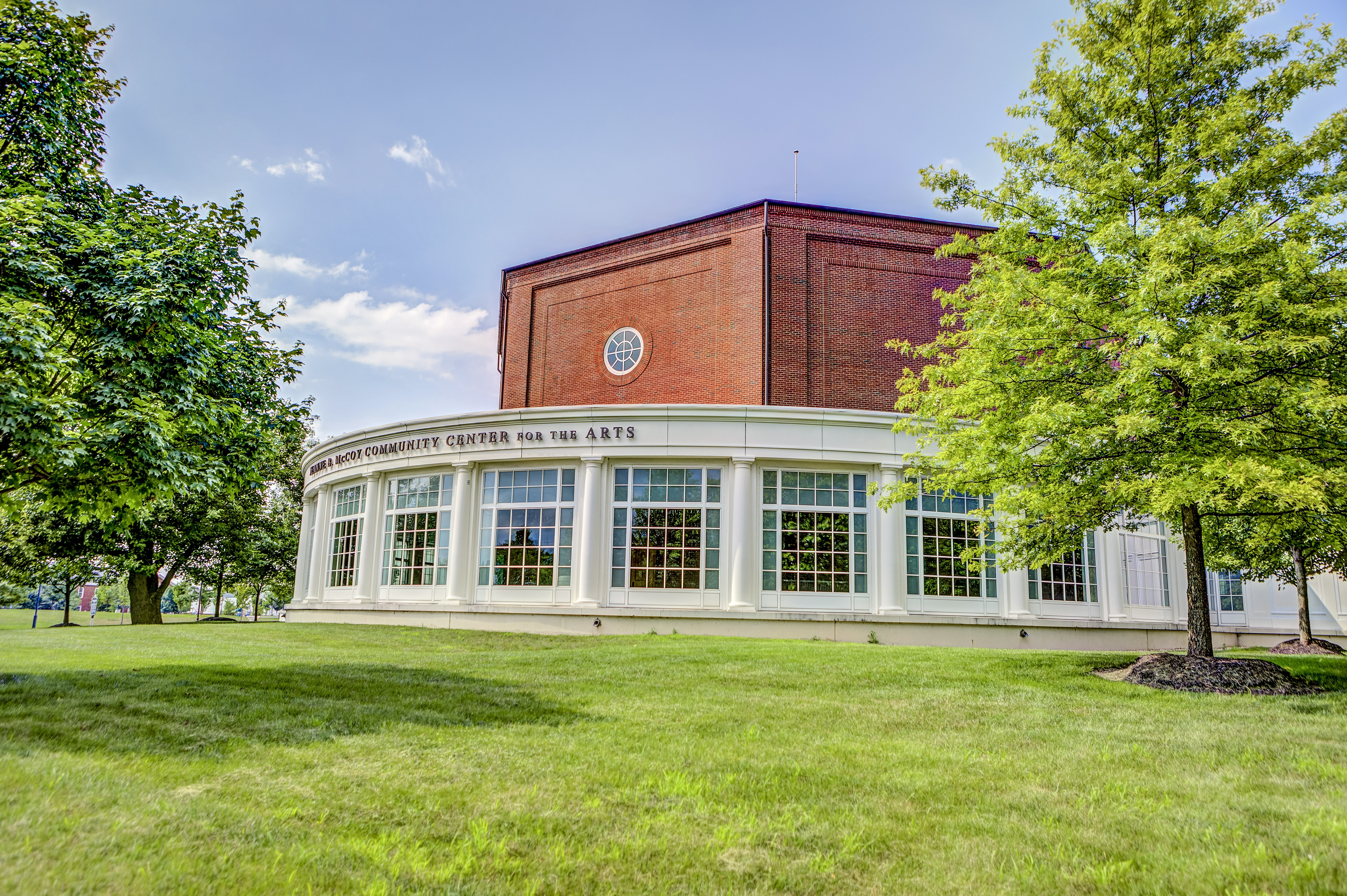
Jeanne B. McCoy Community Center for the Arts

Inspired by the success of the library, the Village of New Albany, Plain Township, and the New Albany-Plain Local School District partnered together in the development of the Jeanne B. McCoy Community Center for the Arts, named after the late wife of John G. McCoy and mother of John B. McCoy. The 35,000-square-foot (3,300 m^{2}) brick building (located contiguous to the downtown learning campus containing the district schools) contains a 786-seat auditorium with balcony seating, a rehearsal studio, a dance studio, a scene shop, and classrooms dedicated to the performing arts. Land for the $15 million facility was donated by The New Albany Company.

Each May since 1976, New Albany residents celebrate New Albany Founders Day with a parade, festival, rides, vendors and street performers.

Taste of New Albany is an annual culinary event (each August since 2002) that draws thousands to Market Square in downtown New Albany to sample (for an entry fee) food from dozens of restaurants. The proceeds from this event benefit the New Albany Chamber of Commerce.

The New Albany Walking Classic is a 10K walking event held annually in early September in New Albany since 2005. It draws thousands of walkers from the Ohio area and beyond, and had over 2,600 finishers in the 2009 race. The event was named the country's best walking event in 2008 by Walk magazine, and is now the country's largest walk-only race. Building on the success of the walking event, community members and civic leaders created the nonprofit Healthy New Albany and opened the Philip Heit Center for Healthy New Albany.

The New Albany Classic is a USEF/FEI-sanctioned equestrian event held each September since 1998 on the estate of Les Wexner and his wife Abigail, founder of the event. The event raises money for the Columbus Coalition Against Family Violence. The related Family Day has many activities, including a concert, amusement rides, and displays of animals from the Columbus Zoo and Aquarium.

Teen band New Hollow is based in New Albany; the members of the band met in New Albany schools.

== Government ==
New Albany is a part of Ohio's 3rd congressional district, currently represented by congresswoman Joyce Beatty as well as a part of Ohio's 12th congressional district represented by congressman Troy Balderson.

== Child sex trafficking allegations ==
New Albany received global attention following the release of the Epstein files as a purported hub of child sex trafficking and sexual slavery. Multiple victims of Epstein and his associates, including Maria Farmer and Virginia Giuffre, have alleged widespread child sexual abuse within the jurisdiction. This was purportedly done with the support of local police. Convicted sex trafficker and Epstein co-conspirator Ghislaine Maxwell told the deputy U.S. attorney general that Epstein "ran New Albany".

On February 18, 2026, a delegation of the House Committee on Oversight and Government Reform traveled to the area to depose Epstein associate Les Wexner in a closed-door hearing.

== Notable people ==
- Julia DeVillers, author
- Jeffrey Epstein, financier and sex offender
- David Goodman, former director of the Ohio Department of Commerce and member of the Ohio General Assembly
- Jean-Luc Grand-Pierre, former professional ice hockey defenseman
- Darron Lee, National Football League linebacker
- Bobby Rahal, IndyCar Series team owner, three-time IndyCar Series champion and 1986 Indianapolis 500 winner
- Graham Rahal, IndyCar Series race car driver
- Kiefer Sherwood, professional ice hockey right winger
- Les Wexner, billionaire founder of The Limited Brands
