= Darron Lee =

American football player (born 1994)

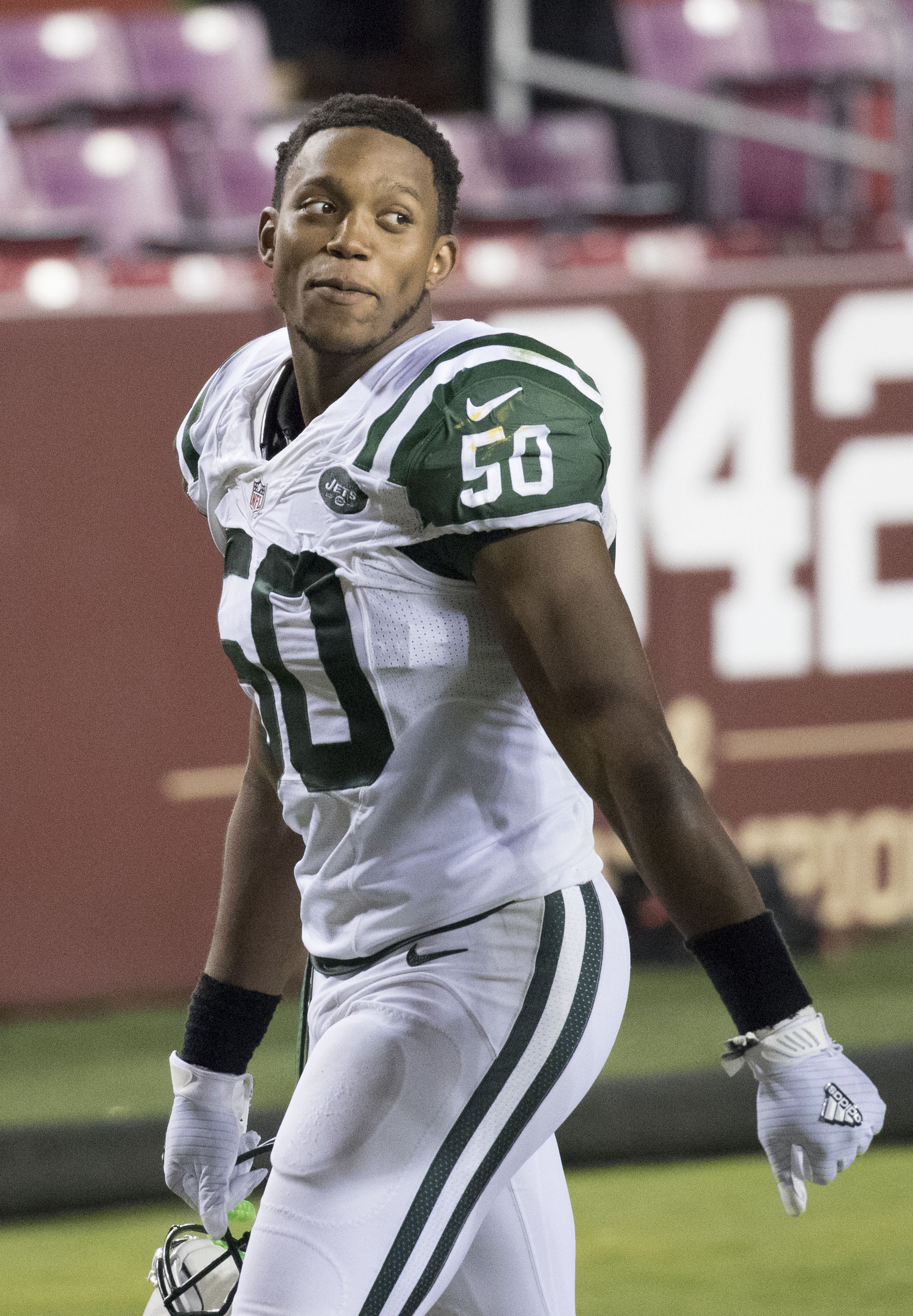
- Lee with the New York Jets in 2016

No. 50, 58, 52
- Position: Linebacker

Personal information
- Born: October 18, 1994 (age 32); Chattanooga, Tennessee, U.S.
- Listed height: 6 ft 1 in (1.85 m)
- Listed weight: 232 lb (105 kg)

Career information
- High school: New Albany (New Albany, Ohio)
- College: Ohio State (2013–2015)
- NFL draft: 2016: 1st round, 20th overall pick

Career history
- New York Jets (2016–2018); Kansas City Chiefs (2019); Buffalo Bills (2020); Las Vegas Raiders (2021)*
- * Offseason or practice squad member only

Awards and highlights
- Super Bowl champion (LIV); CFP national champion (2015); Second-team All-American (2015); Second-team All-Big Ten (2015)

Career NFL statistics
- Total tackles: 273
- Sacks: 4
- Forced fumbles: 2
- Pass deflections: 11
- Interceptions: 3
- Defensive touchdowns: 1
- Stats at Pro Football Reference

Darron Lee (born October 18, 1994) is an American former professional football player who was a linebacker in the National Football League (NFL). He played college football for the Ohio State Buckeyes and was selected by the New York Jets in the first round of the 2016 NFL draft. He was also a member of the Kansas City Chiefs, Buffalo Bills, and Las Vegas Raiders.

In 2026, Lee was charged with first-degree murder in connection with the death of his girlfriend.

== Early life ==
Originally from Chattanooga, Tennessee, Lee moved to New Albany, Ohio during his sixth grade and attended New Albany High School, where he played as a quarterback, wide receiver, safety, and return specialist and led his team to an appearance in the state semifinals as a senior, where they lost to Trotwood-Madison High School, 33–32. In his junior year, Lee helped the Eagles compile a 9–3 record, as the regional semifinalist also captured the Ohio Capital Conference title. As a senior, Lee concentrated on quarterback and secondary duties, helping lead the Eagles to an 11–3 record, including a 7–0 mark as the Division II State Final Four choice captured the regional and Ohio Capital Conference titles. He was named first-team Associated Press Division II All-state as he accounted for over 1,700 yards of offense and 21 touchdowns and recorded five interceptions.

Lee also competed for both the Eagles’ indoor and outdoor track & field teams. During the 2012 indoor season, he had a personal-best 7.23-second clocking in the 60-meter dash and also had a 5’10” (1.78m) high jump at the OSU Buckeye Qualifier Meet. Performing for the outdoor team, he captured the 200-meter title with a 22.21-second clocking and was a member of the 4x400 relay team that took gold with a time of 3:24.53 at the District Running Event; he also had a season-best 43.52-second run as a member of the 4x100 relay team that finished third at the Stingel Invitational. In order to concentrate on offseason football training, Lee was limited during the 2013 indoor season. For the outdoor team in 2013, he finished third in the 100 meters with a personal-best time of 11.06 seconds at the Central District III Meet.

Lee was rated by Rivals.com as a three-star recruit. He was also rated the 29th-best safety in the nation and received four-star status from Scout.com, while ESPN rated him the 28th-best overall player in the state of Ohio. On May 26, Lee committed to Ohio State University to play college football.

== College career ==
Lee played in two games as a true freshman in 2013 before suffering an injury, which caused him to receive a medical redshirt. After his redshirt freshman season in 2014, Lee switched to linebacker and became a starter. He was named the Defensive MVP of the 2015 Sugar Bowl after he recorded seven tackles and two sacks.

== Professional career ==
=== Pre-draft ===
On January 2, 2016, Lee announced his decision to forgo his remaining eligibility and enter the 2016 NFL draft through a statement released via Twitter. Prior to the NFL Combine, the majority of NFL draft experts and scouts projected Lee to be a mid-to-late first round pick in the 2016 NFL Draft. At the NFL Scouting Combine, Lee solidified his position as a potential first round pick by putting up solid numbers in the combine drills. He finished first among all linebackers in the 40-yard dash and broad jump, finished third among linebackers in the short shuttle, and finished fifth among linebackers in the vertical jump. His time of 4.43s in the 40-yard dash was the fastest 40 time by a linebacker in nine years and was also better than Ohio State running back Ezekiel Elliott and wide receiver Braxton Miller. Lee's 11’1” broad jump was the third best performance by a linebacker since 2006.

External videos
- Darron Lee’s NFL Combine Workout
- Darron Lee runs the 40-yard dash
- Darron Lee at Ohio State’Pro Day

On March 11, 2016, Lee participated at Ohio State's pro day, but opted to stand on his combine numbers and only performed positional drills. He attended pre-draft visits with multiple teams, including the Buffalo Bills, Chicago Bears, New York Jets, and Minnesota Vikings. At the conclusion of the pre-draft process, Lee was projected to be a first round pick by NFL draft experts and scouts. He was ranked as the second best outside linebacker prospect in the draft by DraftScout.com, was ranked the third best linebacker by NFL analyst Mike Mayock, and was ranked the fourth best linebacker in the draft by Sports Illustrated, NFL analyst Bucky Brooks, and ESPN.

Pre-draft measurables
Height	Weight	Arm length	Hand span	Wingspan	40-yard dash	10-yard split	20-yard split	20-yard shuttle	Three-cone drill	Vertical jump	Broad jump	Bench press	Wonderlic
6 ft 0 3/4 in (1.85 m)	232 lb (105 kg)	33 1/4 in (0.84 m)	9 3/4 in (0.25 m)	6 ft 7 1/4 in (2.01 m)	4.47 s	1.55 s	2.60 s	4.20 s	7.12 s	35.5 in (0.90 m)	11 ft 1 in (3.38 m)	17 reps	31
All values from NFL Combine

=== New York Jets ===
==== 2016 ====
The Jets selected Lee in the first round (20th overall) of the 2016 NFL draft. Lee was the second linebacker drafted in 2016, behind Georgia outside linebacker Leonard Floyd (9th overall). On July 27, 2016, the Jets signed Lee to a four-year, $10.22 million contract that includes $7.92 million guaranteed and a signing bonus of $5.63 million.

External videos
- Jets draft Darron Lee 20th overall
- First Draft: Ohio State LB Darron Lee

Throughout training camp, Lee competed to be a starting inside linebacker against established veteran Erin Henderson. Head coach Todd Bowles named Lee a backup inside linebacker to begin the regular season, behind starters David Harris and Erin Henderson.

He made his professional regular season debut in the Jets’ season-opener against the Cincinnati Bengals and recorded six combined tackles in their 23–22 loss. Lee received more snaps (36) than starting inside linebacker Erin Henderson (21) in the season-opener, although head coach Todd Bowles maintained that Lee would remain a backup. The following week, Lee earned his first career start after Erin Henderson sustained a foot injury. Lee finished the Jets’ 37–31 win at the Bills with five combined tackles in Week 2. On September 25, 2016, Lee recorded six combined tackles and was credited with half a sack during a 24–3 loss at the Kansas City Chiefs in Week 3. In Week 6, Lee suffered an ankle injury during the Jets’ 28–3 loss at the Arizona Cardinals and was inactive for the next three games (Weeks 7–9). In Week 12, Lee collected a season-high 11 combined tackles (five solo) and broke up a pass during a 22–17 loss to the New England Patriots. He finished his rookie season in 2016 with 73 combined tackles (45 solo), three pass deflections, and one sack in 13 games and nine starts. Lee started six consecutive games to end the season after Erin Henderson was placed on the Non-Football Injury list on October 22, 2016, and remained inactive for the remainder of the season. Lee received an overall grade of 38.8 from Pro Football Focus and was the lowest graded rookie linebacker in the league due to his inability to handle pass coverage.

==== 2017 ====
Lee entered training camp slated as a starting inside linebacker after the Jets opted not to re-sign Erin Henderson. Head coach Todd Bowles named Lee and Demario Davis the starting inside linebackers to begin the regular season, alongside outside linebackers Jordan Jenkins and Josh Martin.

He started in the Jets’ season-opener at the Bills and recorded ten combined tackles (seven solo), one pass deflection, and made his first career solo sack during a 21–12 loss. Lee made his first solo sack on Bills’ quarterback Tyrod Taylor in the first quarter. During the game, he was penalized for a late hit on Bills’ center Eric Wood and was subsequently fined $9,115 and also received a fine of $36,464 for a roughing the passer penalty on Dolphins’ quarterback Jay Cutler. In Week 7, he collected a season-high 11 combined tackles (nine solo) during a 31–28 loss at the Miami Dolphins. On December 3, 2017, Lee was suspended by head coach Todd Bowles for one-game for being late to practice. He was suspended for the Jets’ Week 13 victory at the Chiefs. Lee's second season was marred by fines, which totaled $72,965. He received two fines for roughing the passer penalties that were both on Jay Cutler against the Dolphins and also received a fine for an excessive face mask and a late hit. He finished the season with 94 combined tackles (67 solo), three pass deflections, and three sacks in 15 games and 15 starts. Pro Football Focus gave Lee an overall grade of 34.9 in 2017 and ranked 87th out of 88 qualifying linebackers.

==== 2018 ====
Lee entered camp as a starting inside linebacker and was named the starter to begin the regular season. He began the season alongside Avery Williamson and starting outside linebackers Josh Martin and Jordan Jenkins.

He started in the Jets’ season-opener at the Detroit Lions and recorded seven combined tackles, a career-high three pass deflections, made two interceptions, and returned one for his first career touchdown in during their 48–17 victory. Lee made his first career interception off a pass attempt by Lions’ quarterback Matthew Stafford, that was originally intended for running back Theo Riddick, and returned it for a 36-yard touchdown in the third quarter. On December 7, Lee was suspended four games due to a PED violation.

==== 2019 ====
On May 3, 2019, the Jets declined the fifth-year option on Lee's contract, making him a free agent in 2020.

=== Kansas City Chiefs ===
On May 15, 2019, the Jets traded Lee to the Chiefs for a 2020 sixth round draft pick. Lee was a member of the Super Bowl LIV winning Chiefs, who defeated the San Francisco 49ers 31–20, though he was inactive for the game itself.

After becoming a free agent in March 2020, Lee was suspended for the first four weeks of the 2020 NFL season on September 10, 2020. He was reinstated from suspension on October 6.

=== Buffalo Bills ===
On November 2, 2020, Lee was signed to the Buffalo Bills' practice squad. He was elevated to the active roster on November 14 and November 28 for the team's Weeks 10 and 12 games against the Arizona Cardinals and Los Angeles Chargers, and reverted to the practice squad after each game. His practice squad contract with the team expired after the season on February 1, 2021.

=== Las Vegas Raiders ===
On June 17, 2021, Lee signed with the Las Vegas Raiders. He was placed on injured reserve on August 24. Lee was released by the Raiders on August 30.

== Personal life ==
On June 4, 2017, Lee was involved in a verbal altercation with a woman at the Governors Ball Music Festival on Randall's Island. Leonard Williams had pulled Lee away from the fracas, and restrained him. On June 26, 2023, an arrest warrant was issued for Lee when he failed to show up for a court appearance.

=== Arrest ===
On February 6, 2026, Lee was arrested for first-degree murder in the death of his girlfriend, Gabriella Perpetuo. At the time, Lee was on probation in Ohio and Florida. Perpetuo suffered numerous injuries, though the autopsy reported the cause of death as blunt force trauma. Lee's ChatGPT logs where he asked the chatbot about injuries were presented as evidence to the grand jury. On June 11, 2026, Lee was indicted in Hamilton County, Tennessee on a first-degree murder charge. Prosecutors were still considering pursuing the death penalty at the time of the indictment.
