= Rifqa Bary =

Sri Lankan–born American author

- Born: Fathima Rifqa Bary; August 10, 1992 (age 34); Galle, Sri Lanka
- Citizenship: American
- Known for: Fleeing threats of honor killing after converting to Christianity from Islam
- Parent(s): Mohamed Bary (father); Aysha Risana Bary (mother)
- Relatives: Rilvan Bary (older brother); Rajaa Bary (younger brother)
- Website: http://www.hidinginthelight.org

Fathima Rifqa Bary (born August 10, 1992) is a Sri Lankan–born American author. She drew international attention in 2009, when she ran away from her home in Ohio under the threat of an honor killing by her family due to her conversion to Christianity from Islam. As she fled to Florida and sought refuge with a family of evangelical Protestants, her story was widely broadcast on television and discussed on political blogs, eventually becoming a focal point in a religious clash between Christians and Muslims in the United States.

== History ==
Rifqa Bary is the only daughter of Mohamed and Aysha Bary. She grew up in Columbus, Ohio with her older brother Rilvan and her younger brother Rajaa. Her parents initially came to the U.S. from Sri Lanka to seek medical care for Rifqa, after she became blind in her right eye when Rilvan threw a toy airplane at her when she was 5. Rifqa's family moved to the United States in 2000 when she was 8. Prior to moving to Ohio Rifqa was sexually abused by an extended family member. When Rifqa was 12 she considered suicide. After moving into an apartment in Ohio Rifqa shared a room with Rilvan. She and Rilvan attended New Albany High School. Bary's parents have said that they are Muslims and pray five times a day. Her attorney, John Stemberger, who is the leader of a Christian advocacy group, claimed that the Bary family were members of the Noor Islamic Cultural Center (NICC), near Columbus. In an official statement, NICC denied it was familiar with Rifqa Bary or her family and stated that their records showed she attended the cultural center's Sunday School only three times in 2007. Mohamed Bary ran Bary Gems until 2009 when he closed his business.

Rifqa became a Christian in 2005 at the age of 13. In July 2009, she was secretly baptized in Big Walnut Creek, at Hoover Dam Park by her mentor and friend Brian Michael Williams, an aspiring pastor and college student, while her family was not at home. Rifqa eventually became a member of Columbus Korean United Methodist Church. Rifqa would often worship at the local prayer house at Ohio State University.

On July 19, 2009 Rifqa ran away from her family's home to the home of Orlando, Florida Christian pastor Blake Lorenz and his wife, Beverly, with whom Rifqa had communicated on Facebook. Rifqa had told Beverly Lorenz that her parents would kill her for converting to Christianity. Williams drove her to a bus station where a ticket was purchased under an assumed name for her bus ride to Florida. Bary lived with the Lorenzes for more than two weeks before they contacted child welfare authorities, though Florida law required that they contact authorities within 24 hours of receiving Rifqa into their home. The police were able to locate Rifqa through her cell phone and internet history. Rifqa turned herself in to the police and spent two nights in jail until a judge set her free.

Her case drew attention when she appeared on television and declared that her father said, "He would kill me or send me back to Sri Lanka," describing herself as the intended victim of an honor killing. A report commissioned by the Department of Justice under the Obama administration determined that honor killings are a credible threat for some young Muslim women who become "too Westernized."

Her parents said they never threatened to harm her. Her father told a reporter that, "Honestly, we didn't know why she left." Regarding the death threat described by his daughter, he said, "She doesn't know what she's talking about," and, "I want her to come back home. I love my daughter whether she's Christian, or anything else. I want my daughter back."

== Law enforcement investigations ==
Rifqa Bary was taken into custody by Florida child welfare authorities while an investigation was conducted. The court appointed attorneys for her parents: private practitioner Craig McCarthy for the mother, and a lawyer from the state Florida Regional Council for the father. As is the result in the vast majority of cases involving alleged child abuse, the Florida Department of Law Enforcement report was inconclusive, finding no hard evidence of physical or verbal abuse.

In the report, Bary's father states that he did pick up his daughter's laptop to throw it, but did not throw it due to the cost of the laptop (Bary alleged that her father raised the laptop above her head as though ready to hit her with it). The FDLE report raised questions about one claim made by Bary: that her parents did not know she was a cheerleader. The FDLE report states that pictures of her in uniform were prominently displayed in the family's home three days later when the police visited and interviewed them, and that Mr. Bary signed the permission slip for her to be a cheerleader when Mrs. Bary would not. The FDLE report also stated that they did not investigate anyone in the larger Ohio Muslim community and that Florida authorities relied in part on the investigation done by authorities in Ohio.

On October 13, 2009, Orange County (Florida) Judge Daniel P. Dawson ruled that he would return Bary to Ohio pending a settlement of her immigration status.

== Return to Ohio and cancer diagnosis ==
On October 27, 2009, Bary was returned to Ohio and temporarily placed in the custody of Franklin County Children Services. The public agency was to monitor her internet and phone use. They had hoped to reunite the family before August 10, 2010, when Bary would turn 18 years old. A case-management plan was filed on December 1, 2009, stating that Bary and her family needed to have face-to-face talks about their understanding of Christianity and Islam as one step toward reunification.

On December 22, 2009, a magistrate of the Franklin county juvenile court denied Bary's parents' request for forced mediation and set the date for the dependency hearing for the end of January. The hearing was canceled on January 19, 2010, when a deal between the parties was reached with Bary becoming a dependent of the State of Ohio in exchange for admitting that she broke the rules when she ran away. It was agreed that Rifqa would remain in foster care until her 18th birthday. Once Rifqa turned 18 she could do whatever she wanted. Judge Elizabeth Gill ordered Rifqa and her parents to attend counseling. Magistrate Mary Goodrich eventually gave Rifqa permission to contact the Lorenzes. On January 28, 2010, once it was learned that Bary would be allowed to contact Reverend Lorenz and his wife, Bary's parents, on the strict advice of their lawyer, requested to back out of the deal. On March 2, 2010, Judge Gill denied their request and ordered them to continue their counseling sessions so that Rifqa could return home to her family before she turned 18. In June 2010, Bary graduated from Focus Learning Academy. That same year, she was diagnosed with a rare form of uterine cancer. The doctors gave her one year to live. After three surgeries and 45 weeks of chemotherapy, Bary stopped her cancer treatments after attending a faith healing event in Youngstown, Ohio without her parents permission. Her parents asked the courts to force their daughter to continue receiving chemotherapy, but they refused. Mary Goodrich said that because Rifqa's case was not an emergency and her health was not in danger she could not get a court order for her to finish her chemotherapy. Rifqa's cancer treatments made her sick and weak. Rifqa agreed to continue to work with her cancer doctors. After stopping her chemotherapy the cancer was no longer detected in Rifqa's body. Mary Goodrich explained to Rifqa's parents that she was old enough to make her own decisions. Rifqa Bary has been declared cancer free. The doctors warned Rifqa that without chemotherapy the cancer could return. They explained that if the cancer comes back Rifqa would need a hysterectomy and that she would die if the cancer spreads. On August 5, 2010 Mary Goodrich ruled that it was not possible for Rifqa to be reunited with her family. On August 10, 2010, Bary turned 18 years old and Franklin County Children Services' custody of her ended. After the case ended Rifqa's parents told her, "No matter what has happened, you will always be our daughter, we love you, and the door will always be open if you want to have a relationship with us." After the gag order was lifted on her hearings, her father and mother stated that Bary had sent them a video two weeks prior, along with candy and music, saying she loved them. They also stated that Bary sent them letters including one where she thanked them for helping her be a successful student. At the same time, the parents' Ohio attorney, Omar Tarazi, indicated that the Barys have not had a private face-to-face conversation with their daughter, even in the presence of a family counselor, since she ran away. Omar dropped his lawsuit against Bary's lawyer, but he continued to sue Pamela Geller for defamation until September 21, 2011.

== Adult life ==
In September 2010 after turning 18, Bary was granted residency in the United States. She eventually went on to study biology in college and became an evangelist. During her time in college she was able to go on a mission trip to India. On November 6, 2015 Bary became a legal US citizen after she turned 23. On July 15, 2015 Rifqa had surgery to receive a prosthetic eye. She became a writer and signed with WaterBrook Press in 2014. On May 19, 2015 she released her debut book, Hiding in the Light: Why I Risked Everything to Leave Islam and Follow Jesus. Bary has since graduated from college with a degree in philosophy. She is now pursuing a career in law.

== Public debate ==
The situation drew international attention and exposed the "hostility between some Christians and Muslims."

Imam Muhammad Musri of the Islamic Society of Central Florida claimed that the controversy was caused "by far-right religious groups" portraying Islam and Muslims as extreme fundamentalists who might kill a child. Harry Coverston, a religious studies professor and Episcopal priest, suggested that the protestors "need a designated other that will be seen in terms that are demonic and fierce and threatening." Charlie Crist and Marco Rubio made statements in support of Bary. Mathew Staver, president of the Liberty University School of Law and lawyer for the Lorenzes said, "Lorenz had a legitimate reason to believe Rifqa Bary was in fear of her life because she'd converted to Christianity". Many consider this claim valid because according to the World Health Organization, there are about five thousand honor killings each year.
