= List of Billboard number-one disco singles of 1980 =

The Disco Top 100 was a chart published weekly by Billboard magazine in the United States, which ranked the popularity of disco singles in nightclubs across the country, based on a national survey of club disc jockeys.

== Chart history ==
Issue date	Song	Artist
January 5	"The Second Time Around"	Shalamar
January 12	"Vertigo"/"Relight My Fire"/"Free Ride"	Dan Hartman
January 19	"Vertigo"/"Relight My Fire"/"Free Ride"	Dan Hartman
January 26	"Vertigo"/"Relight My Fire"/"Free Ride"	Dan Hartman
February 2	"Vertigo"/"Relight My Fire"/"Free Ride"	Dan Hartman
February 9	"Vertigo"/"Relight My Fire"/"Free Ride"	Dan Hartman
February 16	"Vertigo"/"Relight My Fire"/"Free Ride"	Dan Hartman
February 23	"And the Beat Goes On"/"Can You Do the Boogie"/"Out the Box"	The Whispers
March 1	"And the Beat Goes On"/"Can You Do the Boogie"/"Out the Box"	The Whispers
March 8	"Funkytown"/"All Night Dancing"	Lipps Inc
March 15	"Funkytown"/"All Night Dancing"	Lipps Inc
March 22	"High on Your Love"/"Hot Hot (Give It All You Got)"	Debbie Jacobs
March 29	"Funkytown"/"All Night Dancing"	Lipps Inc
April 5	"Funkytown"/"All Night Dancing"	Lipps Inc
April 12	"Stomp!"	The Brothers Johnson
April 19	"Stomp!"	The Brothers Johnson
April 26	"Stomp!"	The Brothers Johnson
May 3	"A Lover's Holiday"/"The Glow of Love"/"Searching"	Change
May 10	"A Lover's Holiday"/"The Glow of Love"/"Searching"	Change
May 17	"A Lover's Holiday"/"The Glow of Love"/"Searching"	Change
May 24	"A Lover's Holiday"/"The Glow of Love"/"Searching"	Change
May 31	"A Lover's Holiday"/"The Glow of Love"/"Searching"	Change
June 7	"A Lover's Holiday"/"The Glow of Love"/"Searching"	Change
June 14	"A Lover's Holiday"/"The Glow of Love"/"Searching"	Change
June 21	"A Lover's Holiday"/"The Glow of Love"/"Searching"	Change
June 28	"A Lover's Holiday"/"The Glow of Love"/"Searching"	Change
July 5	"Take Your Time (Do It Right)"	The SOS Band
July 12	"Take Your Time (Do It Right)"	The SOS Band
July 19	"Dynamite!"/"Jump to the Beat"	Stacy Lattisaw
July 26	"Take Your Time (Do It Right)"	The SOS Band
August 2	"Take Your Time (Do It Right)"	The SOS Band
August 9	"Upside Down"/"I'm Coming Out"	Diana Ross
August 16	"Upside Down"/"I'm Coming Out"	Diana Ross
August 23	"Upside Down"/"I'm Coming Out"	Diana Ross
August 30	"Fame"/"Red Light"/"Hot Lunch Jam"	Irene Cara/Linda Clifford
September 6	"Upside Down"/"I'm Coming Out"	Diana Ross
September 13	"Upside Down"/"I'm Coming Out"	Diana Ross
September 20	"Love Sensation"	Loleatta Holloway
September 27	"Can't Fake the Feeling"	Geraldine Hunt
October 4	"Can't Fake the Feeling"	Geraldine Hunt
October 11	"Can't Fake the Feeling"	Geraldine Hunt
October 18	"Can't Fake the Feeling"	Geraldine Hunt
October 25	"Can't Fake the Feeling"	Geraldine Hunt
November 1	"Can't Fake the Feeling"	Geraldine Hunt
November 8	"Can't Fake the Feeling"	Geraldine Hunt
November 15	"Shoot Your Best Shot"/"It Don't Hurt No More"	Linda Clifford
November 22	"Shoot Your Best Shot"/"It Don't Hurt No More"	Linda Clifford
November 29	"Shoot Your Best Shot"/"It Don't Hurt No More"	Linda Clifford
December 6	"Shoot Your Best Shot"/"It Don't Hurt No More"	Linda Clifford
December 13	"Lovely One"/"Can You Feel It"/"Walk Right Now"	The Jacksons
December 20	"Celebration"/"Take It to the Top"	Kool & the Gang
December 27	"Celebration"/"Take It to the Top"	Kool & the Gang

== See also ==
- 1980 in music
- List of Billboard Hot 100 number ones of 1980
