= All the Man That I Need =

Song written by Dean Pitchford and Michael Gore and popularized by Whitney Houston

Single by Whitney Houston

from the album I'm Your Baby Tonight
- B-side: "Dancin' on the Smooth Edge"
- Released: December 4, 1990
- Recorded: November–December 1989
- Studio: Tarpan (San Rafael); Right Track (NYC)
- Genre: Pop; R&B
- Length: 4:11
- Label: Arista
- Songwriters: Michael Gore; Dean Pitchford
- Producer: Narada Michael Walden

Whitney Houston singles chronology
"I'm Your Baby Tonight" (1990)	"All the Man That I Need" (1990)	"The Star Spangled Banner" (1991)

Music video
- "All the Man That I Need" on YouTube

"All the Man That I Need" is a song written by Dean Pitchford and Michael Gore. The song was first recorded as "All the Man I Need" by Linda Clifford for her album I'll Keep on Loving You (1982) and later covered around the same time by Sister Sledge for their album The Sisters (1982). The song is better known for being recorded by American singer and actress Whitney Houston, who released it as the official second single from her third album, I'm Your Baby Tonight on Arista Records on December 4, 1990. Houston's recording was produced by Narada Michael Walden and featured American musician Kenny G on saxophone.

Upon its release, the song became a major worldwide hit single, receiving mainly positive reviews from music critics. In the US, the ballad became a multi-chart number one hit on the Billboard charts, topping the Billboard Hot 100 in late February 1991, for a two-week run, giving Houston her ninth number one single, once again tying Houston with fellow pop artist Madonna for the most solo number-one singles recorded by a female artist on the Billboard Hot 100. The song also topped the Hot R&B Singles and Hot Adult Contemporary charts, giving Houston her third "triple-crown" number-one Billboard single and her first to do so since "How Will I Know" topped the same three charts in 1986. It ranks as Houston's fourth biggest hit on the Billboard Hot 100.

In addition, the song helped Houston become the first female solo artist to generate multiple number-one singles from three albums, with only Mariah Carey and Janet Jackson achieving this feat. The song later garnered Houston award nominations including the Grammy Award for Best Female Pop Vocal Performance at the 1992 Grammy Awards and the Soul Train Music Award for Best R&B/Soul Single - Female at the 1992 ceremony.

== Background ==
"All the Man I Need"

Song by Linda Clifford

from the album I'll Keep on Loving You
- Released: 1982
- Genre: Pop; R&B
- Length: 4:07
- Label: Disques Vogue

In 1980, songwriting partners Dean Pitchford and Michael Gore wrote songs for the soundtrack to the movie Fame. Among the songs they wrote for the soundtrack included "Red Light", which they gave to singer Linda Clifford.

Clifford's song became a modest hit on the Billboard charts after its release, going to number 41 on the Billboard Hot 100 and number 40 on the Hot Soul Singles chart and also topped the Hot Dance/Disco chart. In addition to appearing on the Fame soundtrack, the song was also featured on Clifford's album, I'm Yours. The success of their Clifford collaboration led to the songwriters to pitch another song to Clifford titled, "All the Man I Need", which was a departure from Clifford's disco and dance recordings.

Originally written by the pair in 1981, Clifford eventually recorded the song for her 1982 release, I'll Keep on Loving You. Her version featured background vocal arrangement from singer Luther Vandross, who had also worked with Clifford in the past. However, Clifford's label at the time didn't think the sentimental pop ballad would be a hit for the artist and refused to release it as a single.

Around this time, American musical sibling group Sister Sledge was recording songs for their album, The Sisters when they were offered the song to record. The group's lead singer Kathy Sledge would end up recording the song as a vocal duet with singer David Simmons and the song would be prominently featured on the album. During the group's promotion of the record, which included their top 40 rendition of Mary Wells' "My Guy", they appeared on Soul Train where they would perform "My Guy" along with "All the Man I Need" with Kathy Sledge and Simmons performing the song. Unlike "My Guy", however, the ballad failed to become a hit, only reaching number 45 on the Hot Soul Singles chart and failing to chart on the Billboard Hot 100.

Pitchford later stated that although different versions of the song were recorded, no one was scoring a major hit with it: "I figured that it was one of those songs that was going to get cut a number of times and not ever have its day," he said. During a dinner with Arista Records president Clive Davis, the song came up and Davis asked Pitchford to send him a demo. Davis had just finished working with Whitney Houston as the executive producer of her second album, Whitney (1987).

Although Davis was impressed by the song, he felt they would be unable to do anything with it at that time as Houston had only just finished recording an album, so it would be some time before she would be returning to the studio. During this period, Pitchford's publishers received several requests from other artists wishing to record the song. Finally, in 1989, Houston began recording the song with producer Narada Michael Walden as she worked on her third album, I'm Your Baby Tonight.

== Composition ==
"All the Man That I Need" (1990)
A 24-second sample of Whitney Houston's "All the Man That I Need."

Houston's rendition of "All the Man That I Need" is an R&B and pop song with gospel influences. According to the sheet music published at Musicnotes.com by Alfred Music Publishing, the song is written in the key of F minor with a key change to the key of F♯ minor. The beat is set in common time, and moves at a slow tempo of 76 beats per minute. It has the sequence of B♭m–Fm–E♭–E♭/D♭–D♭–Cm_{7} as its chord progression. Houston's vocals in the song span from the note of C♯_{4} to the note of A_{5}, while the piano elements range from the note of B♭_{1} to the high note of F♯_{5} . Stephen Holden of The New York Times, wrote that the song was an "expression of sexual hero worship." The song also features a saxophone solo by American recording artist Kenny G.

== Chart performance ==
Released on December 4, 1990, "All the Man That I Need" entered the US Billboard Hot 100 Singles chart at number 53 on December 22 as the "Hot Shot Debut" of the week. Ten weeks later, on February 23, 1991, it ascended to the top of the chart, replacing C+C Music Factory's "Gonna Make You Sweat (Everybody Dance Now)" at the top spot, becoming Houston's ninth number-one on the chart. It stayed atop the chart for two weeks.

This led to Houston to tie with singer Madonna for recording the most number-one singles by a female artist in the history of the Billboard Hot 100 at the time. It also topped the Hot 100 Singles Sales and Hot 100 Airplay charts, her first song to achieve this feat since "Where Do Broken Hearts Go" in 1988. It enjoyed a seven week run in the top ten of the chart, which was one week shorter than that of the album's lead single "I'm Your Baby Tonight." The song made Houston the first female artist to launch multiple number one singles off three or more albums. The only other female artists to achieve this feat afterwards were Mariah Carey and Janet Jackson.

The single entered the Billboard Hot R&B/Hip-Hop Songs (formerly Hot R&B Singles) at number 58, the same week it debuted on the Hot 100. It later peaked at number one on the chart on March 2, 1991, making it Houston's fifth R&B number-one hit. On the December 22, 1990 issue of Billboard, the song entered the Hot Adult Contemporary charts at number 39, the highest debut of the week. On its sixth week on the chart for the issue dated January 26, 1991, it vaulted to the top ten at number 6. Three weeks later, it reached its pole position at the top for the week of February 16, 1991, replacing "The First Time" by Surface and starting a four-week run at the top of the charts. When it hit the pole position of the R&B chart, the single spent its second and third week at the top of the Hot 100 and Hot Adult Contemporary charts, respectively.

As a result, it became Houston's first single to simultaneously top all three Billboard charts — the Hot 100, Hot R&B, and Hot Adult Contemporary — and overall the third triple-crown hit, after 1985's "Saving All My Love for You" and 1986's "How Will I Know," reached the top spot on those three charts in separate weeks. The song became Houston's thirteenth consecutive top ten single on the chart, tying her with cousin Dionne Warwick for the most consecutive AC top ten hits by a female artist. It was ranked number 16 on the Billboard Hot 100 Year-End chart for 1991. The single was certified Gold by the Recording Industry Association of America (RIAA) for shipments of 500,000 copies or more on March 21, 1991; exactly eighteen years later, in March 2019, it was certified platinum for sales equivalent units of 1 million copies or more. In Canada, the song debuted at 90 on the RPM Top 100 Hit Tracks chart. Seven weeks later, it peaked at number one on the chart and stayed there for a week.

Outside North America, the song experienced some success. It entered the UK Singles Chart at number 27, the week ending date of December 22, 1990, and peaked at number 13 on January 19, 1991, in that country. According to The Official Charts Company, the single has sold 120,000 copies in the United Kingdom. It also reached number 16 in Ireland, 11 in Netherlands, 21 in Austria, and 28 in France. The song also peaked at number 37 in Germany, 36 in New Zealand and 28 in Switzerland.

== Accolades ==
"All the Man That I Need" was nominated for the Grammy Award for Best Pop Vocal Performance, Female, Houston's fifth nomination for the category, at the 34th Grammy Awards on February 26, 1992. The song was also nominated for Soul Train Music Award for Best R&B/Soul Single, Female at the 6th Soul Train Music Awards on March 10, 1992.

In its year-end lists for 1991, Billboard ranked the song the 16th best-selling single on its Top Pop Singles list, 18th in its Top R&B Singles list and was ranked the third best-selling single on its adult contemporary list. On Cash Box, the song was ranked the sixth best-selling pop single of the year.

== Critical reception ==
"All the Man That I Need" garnered mainly positive reviews from music critics. Larry Flick from Billboard magazine complimented it as a "shimmering jazz-and gospel-inflected ballad", and stated that it "fully demonstrates Houston's vocal beauty". Greg Kot of Chicago Tribune was also positive in his review, writing that through the song, Houston was providing "soundtrack to a million love affairs." A reviewer from Melody Maker said, "She really sounds as if she means it and the chorus is more than suitably sumptuous and soaring and shouty so it really ought to be Number One all over the world by Chrimbo." Pan-European magazine Music & Media declared the song as a "staggering gospel-tinged ballad with an overwhelming build-up in the chorus." A reviewer from Music Week commented, "Another sterling performance from Whitney, on a slightly sub-standard song. Nevertheless, a high chart placing seems inevitable." The New York Times' Stephen Holden was also positive in his review, viewing the song as a "hunk of gargantuan pop bombast swathed in echo and glitzy astral twinkles." People Magazine's editor described it as "an effective, down-tempo change of pace". James Hunter from Rolling Stone called it "an outsize ballad about poverty and damaged self-regard, so expertly that the song, with its effective whiff of Spanish guitar, stages undeniable pop drama."

== Retrospective response ==
About.com ranked "All the Man That I Need" number four in their list of "Top 20 Best Whitney Houston Songs" in 2018, noting that it has "a prominent gospel choir in the final chorus." In a 2020 retrospective review, Matthew Hocter from Albumism described it as "a power ballad bringing some serious drama". AllMusic's Ashley S. Battel said that the song is one of "the two high points she does reach on this album [I'm Your Baby Tonight]", and added "the uplifting tale of another's [sic] love being enough to provide happiness in [the song]." BET ranked it the 13th best Whitney Houston song out of forty. In 2022, Billboard ranked the song the tenth best Houston song out of 25, writing "With an impressive musical range, epic key change and expertly deployed sax solo — again courtesy of Mr. Kenny G — it feels like a warmup round for her signature hit cover to come a couple years later, but one that remains plenty stunning in its own right."

== Music video ==
The accompanying music video for "All the Man That I Need" was directed by Peter Israelson, who directed previous Houston music videos, such as "Greatest Love of All" (1986) and "Where Do Broken Hearts Go" (1988).

The video begins with Houston, donning a curly hairstyle, and wearing a black turtleneck, with her initials "WH" embroidered on it, standing against a wall in a house. She then moves forward in the room, and sits on a chair, singing her lines looking into the camera. The video then switches into another room in the house with all white furniture, including a bed, wardrobe, and grand piano, in which Houston sings. She then moves outside on the balcony, where it is raining. After that scene, she is now seen performing, accompanied by a children's choir, on a stage, in front of an audience at some sort of program. The video ends with Houston finishing the performance, with her outline shown online. The stage scenes were shot at the Newark Symphony Hall.

The video enjoyed heavy rotation on BET and VH1 in its initial release and has been viewed over 103 million times on YouTube.

== Live performances ==
Houston performed the song on three of her regional and two world tours. She premiered the song in January 1990, during her Feels So Right Japan Tour, before the release of I'm Your Baby Tonight. The song was performed in 1991 in the Welcome Home Heroes with Whitney Houston concert, and is included on the concert film, taped in Norfolk, Virginia, on March 31, 1991. This performance was also included in the 2014 CD/DVD release, Whitney Houston Live: Her Greatest Performances.

The song was also performed on her third world tour, I'm Your Baby Tonight World Tour. Two different performances of the song on this tour were taped in Yokohama, Japan, on March 15, 1991 and in A Coruña, Spain, on September 29, 1991. The former was broadcast on Japanese TV. The latter was aired on Spanish TV and in the United States in her first hourlong TV special, Whitney Houston: This Is My Life, on ABC TV, dated May 6, 1992.

Two years later on The Bodyguard World Tour (1993–94), she performed the song as a final part of "Love Medley," along with "I Love You", "All at Once", "Nobody Loves Me Like You Do", "Didn't We Almost Have It All" and "Where Do Broken Hearts Go." Four different performances of the song were taped and broadcast on each country's TV channel during South American leg of the tour in 1994: Rio de Janeiro, Brazil, on January 16, during Hollywood Rock festival; Santiago, Chile on April 14; Buenos Aires, Argentina on April 16; and Caracas, Venezuela on April 21. Houston also performed the song on two of her regional tours, The Pacific Rim Tour (1997) and The European Tour (1998).

During performances of the song on the Feels So Right Tour and the I'm Your Baby Tonight World Tour, Houston performed the song similarly to its studio version except near the end where it transformed into a call and response vocal with her and her background singers with a quiet storm rearrangement. For the remainder of most of her tours afterwards, especially on The Bodyguard World Tour, Houston incorporated Toni Braxton's "Breathe Again" and would then switch to a reggae sound. The song was slightly rearranged into a rock sound during the 1998 European Tour, in which Houston used vocal echoes.

Besides her tour performances of the song, she performed the song on various TV shows and the concerts. On December 11, 1990, Houston appeared on The Tonight Show Starring Johnny Carson (guest host: Jay Leno) and performed the song to accompaniment of her tour band. She also performed the song at The Arsenio Hall Show and Saturday Night Live on February 23, 1991, which was her first appearance on the show. That was also the same day the song went to #1 in America on the Billboard Hot 100.

"All the Man That I Need" was performed as a part of medley by Houston at the 2nd Billboard Music Awards on December 9, 1991. The medley consisted of two Billie Holiday's classics―"Lover Man (Oh, Where Can You Be?)" and "My Man"―and the song. In 1996, she performed the song at Brunei: The Royal Wedding Celebration, a private gig for the wedding of Princess Rashidah Sa'adatul Bolkiah, the eldest daughter of the Sultan of Brunei, Hassanal Bolkiah.

== Covers and samples ==
In 1994, Luther Vandross (who made the arrangements of the original Linda Clifford version) included his own version, "All the Woman I Need" on his album Songs. He performed the song at the 2001 BET Awards, in honor of Houston. In 2017, singer Deborah Cox covered the song on her Houston tribute EP, I Will Always Love You. In 2018, singer and actress Heather Headley recorded Houston's rendition of the song on her album Broadway My Way. The song was sampled by rap artist Lil B on his 2014 mixtape Ultimate Bitch on the track "They Want B".

== Track listing and formats ==
- GER Maxi-Single
1. "All the Man That I Need" — 4:11
2. "Dancin' on the Smooth Edge" — 5:50
3. "Greatest Love of All" (Live) — 7:30
- US CD-Single
1. "All the Man That I Need" — 4:11

== Credits and personnel ==
"All the Man That I Need"

- Dean Pitchford – writer
- Michael Gore – writer
- Narada Michael Walden – producer, arranger
- Whitney Houston – vocals
- Walter Afanasieff – keyboards, Moog bass, drum programming, synthesizer
- Louis Biancaniello – additional keyboards, drum programming, additional programming
- Ren Klyce – Fairlight synth programming
- Chris Camozzi – guitar
- Kenny G – tenor saxophone
- Claytoven Richardson – backing vocals
- Karen "Kitty Beethoven" Brewington – backing vocals
- Skyler Jett – backing vocals
- Annie Stockin – backing vocals
- Jeanie Tracy – backing vocals
- Melisa Kary – backing vocals

"Dancin' on the Smooth Edge"

- David Lasley – writer
- Robbie Long – writer
- Whitney Houston – vocals
- Narada Michael Walden – producer, arranger
- Walter Afanasieff – associate producer, keyboards, Moog bass, drum programming, synthesizer
- Louis Biancaniello – additional keyboards, drum programming, additional programming
- Ren Klyce – Fairlight synth programming
- Chris Camozzi – guitar
- Vernon "Ice" Black – guitar
- Claytoven Richardson – backing vocals
- Karen "Kitty Beethoven" Brewington – backing vocals
- Skyler Jett – backing vocals
- Annie Stockin – backing vocals
- Jeanie Tracy – backing vocals
- Melisa Kary – backing vocals

== Charts ==
=== Weekly charts ===
Chart (1991)	Peak position
Australia (ARIA)	59
Austria (Ö3 Austria Top 40)	21
Belgium (Ultratop 50 Flanders)	14
Canada Top Singles (RPM)	1
Canada Retail Singles (The Record)	2
Canada Adult Contemporary (RPM)	1
Canada Contemporary Hit Radio (The Record)	3
Cuba (UPI)	1
Eurochart Hot 100 (Music & Media)	27
European Hit Radio (Music & Media)	2
Finland (Suomen virallinen lista)	17
France (SNEP)	28
Germany (GfK)	37
Iceland (Íslenski Listinn)	2
Ireland (IRMA)	16
Luxembourg (Radio Luxembourg)	10
Netherlands (Dutch Top 40)	9
Netherlands (Single Top 100)	11
New Zealand (Recorded Music NZ)	36
Quebec (ADISQ)	1
Switzerland (Schweizer Hitparade)	28
UK Singles (Official Charts)	13
UK Airplay (Music Week)	1
US Billboard Hot 100	1
US Adult Contemporary (Billboard)	1
US Hot R&B/Hip-Hop Songs (Billboard)	1
US Cash Box Top 100	1
Zimbabwe (ZIMA)	1

Chart (2012)	Peak position
France (SNEP)	121
South Korea International (Gaon)	182

Chart (2022)	Peak position
UK Singles Downloads (Official Charts)	44

=== Year-end charts ===
Chart (1991)	Position
Canada Top Singles (RPM)	26
Canada Adult Contemporary (RPM)	5
Europe (European Hit Radio)	28
US Billboard Hot 100	16
US Adult Contemporary (Billboard)	3
US Hot R&B Singles (Billboard)	18
US Cash Box Top 100	6

== Certifications ==
Region	Certification	Certified units/sales
United States (RIAA)	Platinum	1,000,000^{‡}
^{‡} Sales+streaming figures based on certification alone.

== See also ==
- List of RPM number-one singles of 1991
- List of Hot 100 number-one singles of 1991 (U.S.)
- List of Hot Adult Contemporary number ones of 1991
- List of number-one R&B singles of 1991 (U.S.)

== Bibliography ==
- Seal, Richard (1994). One Moment in Time: Whitney Houston. Britannia Press Publishing. ISBN 0-9519937-8-X.
