= Out Here on My Own =

Single by Irene Cara

from the album Fame
- B-side: "Out Here on My Own"; (Vocal with Full Orchestration)
- Released: August 1980
- Length: 3:09
- Label: RSO
- Songwriters: Lesley Gore, Michael Gore
- Producer: Michael Gore

Irene Cara singles chronology
"Fame" (1980)	"Out Here on My Own" (1980)	"Anyone Can See" (1982)

"Out Here on My Own" is a ballad from the 1980 musical film Fame, performed by Irene Cara (vocals) and Frank Owens (piano). It was written by sibling songwriting duo Lesley Gore (lyricist) and Michael Gore (composer). The recording was produced by Michael Gore. Cara sang the song at the 1981 Academy Awards, where it was nominated for Best Original Song. The song was released on the Fame soundtrack, which also contains an instrumental version of the track.

== Critical reception ==
In its original review of the song in August 1980, Billboard described Cara's performance as "a sensitive vocal reading with only acoustical keyboard supporting her graceful voice", and noted it was certain to impact "pop and adult contemporary play". A writer in the Ottawa Citizen described the song as "showstopping". Upon the re-release of the soundtrack in 2003, Chuck Taylor of Billboard wrote that the song "remains as simplistic and memorable a statement of isolation as has ever been written". Dance Magazine wrote, "The lyrics to “Fame”, “Out Here on My Own" and “I Sing the Body Electric” became anthems for young performers following their passions". Comparing the 1980 film and 2009 remake, Today.com wrote that Naturi Naughton's version is a "gigantic and booming...anthem for careerist kids determined to bulldoze their way into a multi-platform revenue stream deal with ICM", while in the original film, "Cara sings the song, gets told how good she is, then dismisses the entire thing by calling it 'sentimental s---'".

In a review of the 2009 film, The Independent Critic wrote "The music in Tancharoen's "Fame" certainly has its moment, most notably Naughton's outstanding version of the original film's "Out Here on My Own," the only left over with the exception of a closing credit Naughton version of "Fame". FilmSchoolRejects wrote "only one scene transcends the façade and evokes genuine feeling: Naughton’s terrific rendition of “Out Here on My Own,” which gets closer to evoking the emotions swelling in an artist struggling to find her place in the world than a thousand heavily choreographed hip-hop dance numbers ever could". The AV Club deemed it a "heartbreaking cover" while FilmScoreClickTrack described the song as a "gorgeous ballad".

== Awards and nominations ==
The song was nominated for the Academy Award for Best Original Song. This was the first time two songs from the same film had both been nominated in this category. Fame went on to win the prize over Out Here on My Own, though both became hit singles of 1980. Out Here on My Own became a "multi-platinum soundtrack record". Michael Gore, commenting on the joint nomination for a project a brother/sister team had worked on together, said "I'm not sure if that has ever happened before".

== Covers ==
- Angela Clemmons released a version of the song as a single in 1980 that reached #61 on the US R&B chart.
- Nikka Costa covered the song for her 1981 self-titled debut album. The single reached No. 1 in Italy, No. 72 in Germany, No. 7 in Switzerland, No. 32 in the Netherlands and No. 13 in the Flanders region of Belgium.
- The song was recorded by Mariah Carey in July 2000, intended for her Glitter soundtrack project, but was not selected for the Glitter album in 2001. Her version was eventually released in 2020 as the second single off The Rarities but did not chart in the US or in any major music markets.
- Lesley Gore recorded her own version of the song, "understated and moving," for her final album, Ever Since (2005).
- Amber Riley and Lea Michele recorded the song as part of the soundtrack for the third episode in season three of Glee, titled Asian F.

== Charts ==
=== Weekly charts ===
Weekly chart performance for "Out Here on My Own"
Chart (1980)	Peak position
Australia (Kent Music Report)	41
UK Singles (Official Charts)	58
US Billboard Hot 100	19
US Adult Contemporary (Billboard)	20
US Cash Box Charts	25

== Certifications and sales ==
Region	Certification	Certified units/sales
Brazil (Pro-Música Brasil) Nikka Costa's version	Platinum	500,000
France (SNEP) Nikka Costa's version	Platinum	1,200,000
Italy Nikka Costa's version	—	400,000
Summaries
Worldwide Nikka Costa's version	—	3,000,000
