= Fame (soundtrack) =

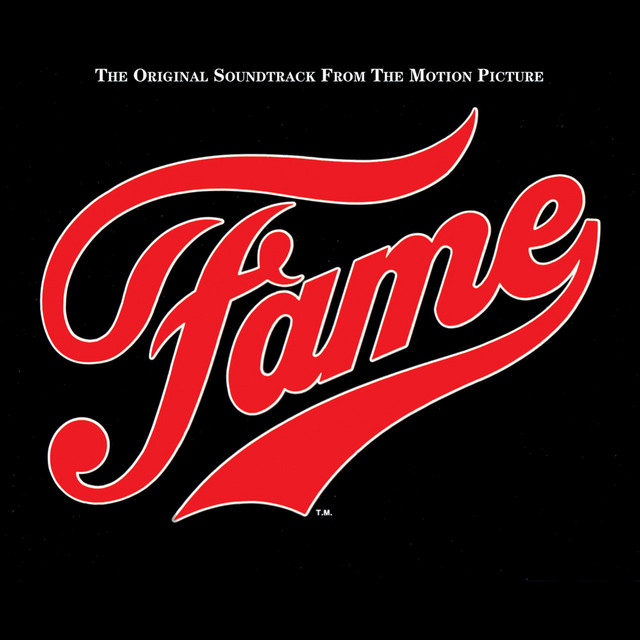

Soundtrack album by Michael Gore
- Released: May 1980
- Recorded: 1979–1980
- Genres: Disco, pop, gospel, singer/songwriter, choral, instrumental, orchestral
- Length: 35:08
- Label: RSO
- Producer: Michael Gore

Singles from Fame
- 1. "Fame" Released: May 1980; 2. "Out Here on My Own" Released: August 1980; 3. "Red Light" Released: August 1980

Fame: The Original Soundtrack from the Motion Picture is the soundtrack from the film of the same name, released in 1980 by RSO Records. In 2003, it was reissued on CD with three bonus tracks, which was then reissued again in 2009 and 2012.

== Release and singles ==
The motion picture soundtrack album for Fame was released in the U.S. on May 16, 1980, by RSO Records. It features nine songs, all of which appear in various scenes in the film. In his later review for AllMusic, Stephen Thomas Erlewine awarded the album five stars out of five and wrote, "Yes, the production techniques often do sound dated ... but the music by Michael Gore is dynamic, varied, and alive, sung with real passion and vigor, and it still retains its essential spark 23 years after it was a pop culture phenomenon."

In the US, the title song "Fame" was released as a single in May 1980, and reached number 4 on Billboard's Hot 100 chart while the album reached number 7 on the Billboard 200 chart. A second single, "Out Here on My Own", was released in August and reached number 19 on the Hot 100 chart, while the third single "Red Light" by Linda Clifford was number 41.

"Fame" was released in the UK at the end of June, however, it failed to chart. The album was released in the following month, peaking at number 21 on the UK Albums Chart. "Out Here on My Own" was also released in the UK and it too failed to chart. However, in June 1982, after the success of the Fame TV series, "Fame" was re-released, topping the Singles Chart for three weeks, spending a total of 16 weeks on the chart and it became the second biggest selling single in the United Kingdom of 1982. After its success, the Fame album was also re-released and also topped the Album Charts. In August, "Out Here on My Own" was re-released, peaking at number 58.

== Track listing ==
No.	Title	Writer(s)	Original artist	Length
1.	"Fame"	Michael Gore, Dean Pitchford	Irene Cara	5:14
2.	"Out Here on My Own"	Michael Gore, Lesley Gore	Irene Cara	3:11
3.	"Hot Lunch Jam"	Michael Gore, Lesley Gore, Robert F. Colesberry	Irene Cara	4:10
4.	"Dogs in the Yard"	Dominic Bugatti, Frank Musker	Paul McCrane	3:13
5.	"Red Light"	Michael Gore, Dean Pitchford	Linda Clifford	6:10
6.	"Is It Okay If I Call You Mine?"	Paul McCrane	Paul McCrane	2:40
7.	"Never Alone"	Anthony Evans	Contemporary Gospel Chorus of the High School of Music and Art	3:23
8.	"Ralph and Monty (Dressing Room Piano)"	Michael Gore	Michael Gore	1:49
9.	"I Sing the Body Electric"	Michael Gore, Dean Pitchford	Laura Dean, Irene Cara, Paul McCrane, Traci Parnell, Eric Brockington	4:59
Total length:				35:08

2003 Reissue bonus tracks
No.	Title	Writer(s)	Original artist	Length
10.	"Miles From Here" (previously unissued)	Michael Gore; Dean Pitchford	Paul McCrane	3:01
11.	"Out Here On My Own (Instrumental)"	Michael Gore; Lesley Gore	Michael Gore	3:12
12.	"Fame (Instrumental)"	Michael Gore; Dean Pitchford	Michael Gore	5:21
Total length:				46:44

== Personnel ==
=== Musicians ===
Vocalists

- Eric Brockington – lead vocals (9), backing vocals (3, 9), tambourine (3, 9)
- Irene Cara – lead vocals (1, 2, 3, 9), backing vocals (1, 3)
- Laura Dean – lead vocals (9)
- Linda Clifford – lead vocals (5)
- Paul McCrane – lead vocals (4, 6, 9), guitar (6)
- Traci Parnell – lead vocals (9), backing vocals (3, 9), tambourine (3, 9)
- Contemporary Gospel Chorus of the High School of Music and Art – vocals (7)
- Alan Vetter – backing vocals (9)
- Amy Wheeler – backing vocals (9)
- Ann Roboff – backing vocals (9)
- Ann E. Sutton – backing vocals (1, 3)
- Annie Roboff – backing vocals (3)
- Anthony Evans – backing vocals (3, 9), tambourine (3, 9)
- Anthony Ogburn – backing vocals (3)
- April Lang – backing vocals (3, 9)
- Ben Werblolowsky – backing vocals (9)
- Cheryl Questell – backing vocals (3)
- Cheryl Williams – backing vocals (9)
- Darryl Ware – backing vocals (9), tambourine (9)
- Deborah McDuffie – backing vocals (1)
- Delphia Shipman – backing vocals (9), tambourine (9)
- Denise Andrades – backing vocals (9)
- Derek Cheeley – backing vocals (9)
- Desiree Lindsay – backing vocals (3), tambourine (3)
- Gordon Sayles – backing vocals (3, 9), tambourine (3)
- Jean Deetjin – backing vocals (9)
- Judith Charlton – backing vocals (9)
- Julie Cohen – backing vocals (9)
- Kevin Windley – backing vocals (9)
- Kim Carlson – backing vocal (3)
- Ladd Boris – backing vocals (9)
- Lance Gross – backing vocals (9)
- Leonard Battle – backing vocals (9)
- Lillian Miller – backing vocals (9)
- Linda Jefferson – backing vocals (9)
- Lisa Herman – backing vocals (3, 9)
- Lisa Lowell – backing vocals (3, 9)
- Louise Bethune – backing vocals (1, 3)
- Luanne Holder – backing vocals (9)
- Luther Vandross – backing vocals (1)
- Maeretha Stewart – backing vocals (5)
- Mary Wormworth – backing vocals (3)
- Monica Dizozza – backing vocals (9)
- Nanette Dermanjian – backing vocals (9)
- Nanette Schwersenz – backing vocals (9)
- Peggi Blu – backing vocals (1)
- Ralph Dujour – backing vocals (9)
- Raul Lugo – backing vocals (9)
- Robert Bostwick – backing vocals (9)
- Robert Koch – backing vocals (3, 9)
- Rodney Gray – backing vocals (9)
- Saundra Evans – backing vocals (9)
- Shirley Jiha – backing vocals (9)
- Thais Hockaday – backing vocals (3)
- Ullanda McCullough – backing vocals (1, 5)
- Vicki Sue Robinson – backing vocals (1, 3)
- Wanda Tanks – backing vocals (9)
- Willie Henry Jr. – backing vocals (3, 9)
- Vivian Cherry – backing vocals (5)
- Yvette Carrington – backing vocals (9)
- Yvonne Lewis – backing vocals (1)

String and keyboard musicians

- Billy Cross – guitar (9)
- Cliff Morris – guitar (4)
- David Spinozza – guitar (1)
- Elliott Randall – guitar solo (1)
- Jeff Layton – guitar (4)
- Jeff Mironov – guitar (1, 5)
- Ross Traut – guitar (5)
- Steve Khan – guitar (5)
- Michael Monaco – electric guitar (3)
- Gene Santini – bass guitar (9)
- Marcus Miller – bass guitar (4)
- Neil Jason – bass guitar (1, 3, 5)
- Cliff Carter – keyboards (5)
- Leon Pendarvis – keyboards (1)
- Rob Mounsey – keyboards (1), piano (4)
- Frank Owens – piano (2)
- Lee Curreri – piano (3)
- Michael Gore – piano (8)
- Ray Chew – piano (3), keyboards (5)
- Steve Margoshes – piano (9)
- Wade Lassister – piano (7)
- Ken Bichel – synthesizer (1)
- Suzanne Ciani – synthesizer (4)
- Tim Tobias – synthesizer (5)
- Alla Goldberg – cello (9)
- Carolyn Halif – cello (9)
- Holly Singer – cello (9)
- Jesse Levy – cello (4)
- Jonathan Abramowitz – cello (3, 4)
- Lawrence Lenske – cello (9)
- Maurice Bialkin – cello (3, 9)
- Richard Locker – cello (4, 9)
- Seymour Barab – cello (3)
- Donald Palma – double bass (9)
- John Beal – double bass (4, 9)
- Lewis Paer – double bass (9)
- Ralph Oxman – double bass (9)
- Ron Carter – double bass (4)
- Carolyn Voight – viola (9)
- Evelyn Glover – viola (9)
- Harold Coletta – viola (9)
- Helen C. Huybrechts – viola (9)
- Judy Geist – viola (4)
- Julien Barber – viola (4)
- Lenore Weinstock – viola (4)
- Maureen Gallagher – viola (4)
- Seymour Berman – viola (9)
- Sue Pray – viola (9)
- Adam Abeshouse – electric violin (3)
- Alphonse Schipani – violin (9)
- Arianne Bronne – violin (9)
- Carmel Malin – violin (9)
- Diana Halprin – violin (4)
- Frederick Buldrini – violin (4, 9)
- Harold Kohon – violin (4)
- Israel Chorberg – violin (9)
- Jean Ingraham – violin (9)
- Joe Malin – violin (4, 9)
- Joseph Rabushka – violin (4)
- Joyce Flissler – violin (9)
- Kathryn Kienke – violin (9)
- Lamar Alsop – violin (4)
- Leo Kahn – violin (9)
- Leon Goldstein – violin (9)
- Leonore Walaniuk – violin (9)
- Lewis Eley – violin (4)
- Marilyn Wright – violin (9)
- Max Ellen – violin (4)
- Max Hollander – violin (9)
- Peter Dimitriades – violin (9)
- Peter VanDerwater – violin (9)
- Regis Iandiorio – violin (4, 9)
- Sanford Allen – violin (4)
- Suzanne Ornstein – violin (9)
- Tony Posk – violin (4)

Brass and wind musicians

- Donald MacCourt – bassoon (9)
- Loren Glickman – bassoon (9)
- Charles Russo – clarinet (9)
- William Blount – clarinet (9)
- Andrew Lolya – flute (9)
- Julius Baker – flute (9)
- Phil Bodner – flute (9)
- Al Richmond – French horn (9)
- Peter Gordon – French horn (9)
- Ron Sell – French horn (9)
- Sharon Moe – French horn (9)
- Don Frank Brooks – harmonica (3)
- George Marge – oboe (9)
- Marsha Heller – oboe (9)
- Dave Tofani – alto saxophone (3)
- David Glasser – alto saxophone (3)
- George Young – alto saxophone (5)
- Ronnie Cuber – baritone saxophone (5)
- Denny Morouse – tenor saxophone (3)
- Harold Vick – tenor saxophone (5)
- David Taylor – bass trombone (5), trombone (9)
- Barry Rogers – tenor trombone (5)
- Dave Bargeron – tenor trombone (5)
- Eddie Bert – trombone (9)
- Harry DiVito – trombone (9)
- Chris Rogers – trumpet (3)
- Danny Cahn – trumpet (9)
- James Sedlar – trumpet (9)
- Jon Faddis – trumpet (5)
- Lew Soloff – trumpet (9)
- Mike Lawrence – trumpet (3)
- Randy Brecker – trumpet (5)

Drum and percussion musicians

- Allan Schwartzberg – drums (9)
- Yogi Horton – drums (1)
- Bob Fisher – drums (3)
- Steve Jordan – drums (5)
- Chris Parker – drums (4)
- 'Crusher' Bennett – percussion (1)
- Gordon Gottlieb – percussion (9)
- James Ogden – percussion (9)
- Jimmy Maelen – percussion (1, 5)
- Michael Levenson – percussion (9)
- Tony Lewis – percussion (3)

=== Technical ===
- Chuck Irwin – recording engineer
- Frank Kulaga – recording engineer, mixing engineer
- Lincoln Clapp – assistant engineer
- Bernie Grundman – mastering engineer
- Gil Askey – arrangement (5), producer (5)
- Leon Pendarvis – arrangement (1)
- Steve Margoshes – arrangement (4, 9)
- Norman Hollyn – music editorial coordinator
- Pamela Adler – production coordination
- Artie Kaplan – music contractor
- Earl Shendell – music contractor
- Sephra Herman – music contractor
- Glenn Ross – art direction and design
- Tim Owens – art direction and design

== Charts ==
=== Weekly charts ===
Year	Chart	Peak position
1980	Australian Albums (Kent Music Report)	4
1980	Canada Top Albums/CDs (RPM)	20
1980	French Albums (IFOP)	14
1980	Norwegian Albums (VG-lista)	11
1980	Spanish Albums (Promusicae)	26
1980	Swedish Albums (Sverigetopplistan)	2
1980	UK Albums (Official Charts)	21
1980	US Billboard 200	7
1982	New Zealand Albums (RMNZ)	22
1982	UK Albums (Official Charts)	1
1983	Finnish Albums (Suomen virallinen lista)	22
1983	Dutch Albums (Album Top 100)	2
1983	Spanish Albums (Promusicae)	13

=== Year-end charts ===
Year	Chart	Position
1982	New Zealand Albums (RMNZ)	19
1982	UK Albums (BMRB)	28
1983	Duch Albums (Album Top 100)	36

== Sales and certifications ==
Region	Certification	Certified units/sales
Australia (ARIA)	Platinum	50,000^{^}
Canada (Music Canada)	Platinum	100,000^{^}
France (SNEP) certified in 1981	Gold	100,000^{*}
France (SNEP) certified in 1983	2× Gold	200,000^{*}
Hong Kong (IFPI Hong Kong)	Gold	10,000^{*}
Netherlands (NVPI)	Gold	50,000^{^}
Portugal (AFP)	Gold	30,000
Spain (Promusicae)	Gold	50,000^{^}
United Kingdom (BPI)	Gold	100,000^{^}
United States (RIAA)	Platinum	1,000,000^{^}
^{*} Sales figures based on certification alone.^{^} Shipments figures based on certification alone.
