= I'm Yours (Linda Clifford album) =

Studio album by Linda Clifford
- Released: 1980
- Recorded: Master Sound Studios (Atlanta, Georgia); Curtom Studios (Chicago, Illinois)
- Genre: Soul, disco
- Label: RSO/Curtom
- Producer: Isaac Hayes, Michael Gore, Gil Askey

Linda Clifford chronology
The Right Combination (with Curtis Mayfield) (1980)	I'm Yours (1980)	I'll Keep on Loving You (1982)

Singles from I'm Yours
- 1. "Red Light" Released: July 11, 1980; 2. "Shoot Your Best Shot" Released: September 1980; 3. "It Don't Hurt No More" Released: September 1980; 4. "I Had a Talk with My Man" Released: December 1980

Professional ratings
Review scores
Source	Rating
AllMusic	3/5 stars

I'm Yours is the sixth studio album recorded by American singer Linda Clifford, released in 1980 on the RSO/Curtom label.

== Chart performance ==
The album peaked at No. 47 on the R&B albums chart. It also reached No. 160 on the Billboard 200. The album features the singles "Red Light", which peaked at No. 1 on the Hot Dance/Disco chart, No. 41 on the Billboard Hot 100, and No. 40 on the Hot Soul Singles chart; "Shoot Your Best Shot", which charted at No. 1 on the Hot Dance/Disco chart and No. 43 on the Hot Soul Singles chart, and "I Had a Talk with My Man", which reached No. 53 on the Hot Soul Singles chart.

== Track listing ==
All tracks are written by Isaac Hayes, except where noted.

Side one
No.	Title	Writer(s)	Length
1.	"Shoot Your Best Shot"	Isaac Hayes, Mignon Hayes	7:48
2.	"I Had a Talk with My Man"	Billy Davis, Leonard Caston Jr.	6:15
3.	"It Don't Hurt No More"		7:32

Side two
No.	Title	Writer(s)	Length
4.	"Red Light"	Michael Gore, Dean Pitchford	3:40
5.	"I Want to Get Away with You"		4:49
6.	"If You Let Me"		4:14
7.	"I'm Yours"		4:16

== Personnel ==
- Ben Picone and the Atlanta Strings – strings
- Skip Lane and the Atlanta Horns – horns
- Travis Biggs, Jesse Butler, Isaac Hayes – keyboards
- Emmett North Jr., Kim Palumu – guitars
- Derek Galbraith – bass
- Daniel Zebulon – percussion
- Willie Hall – drums
- Diane Davis, Diane Evans, Pat Lewis, Rose Williams, Linda Clifford – backup vocals
- Bill Purse – horn & string arranger

== Charts ==
Chart (1980)	Peak
U.S. Billboard Top LPs	160
U.S. Billboard Top Soul LPs	47

Singles

Year	Single	Peaks		
Year	Single	US	US R&B	US Dan
1980	"Red Light"	41	40	1
1980	"Shoot Your Best Shot"	—	43	1
1980	"It Don't Hurt No More"	—	—	1
1980	"I Had a Talk with My Man"	—	53	—
