= The Immaculate Collection =

1990 greatest hits album by Madonna

Greatest hits album by Madonna
- Released: November 12, 1990
- Recorded: 1983–1990
- Genre: Pop
- Length: 73:32
- Labels: Sire; Warner Bros.
- Producers: Madonna; Lenny Kravitz; Shep Pettibone (new tracks)

Madonna chronology
I'm Breathless (1990)	The Immaculate Collection (1990)	Erotica (1992)

Singles from The Immaculate Collection
- 1. "Justify My Love" Released: November 6, 1990; 2. "Rescue Me" Released: February 25, 1991

The Immaculate Collection is the first greatest hits album by American singer Madonna, released on November 12, 1990, by Sire Records. It contains fifteen of her hit singles recorded throughout the 1980s, as well as two new tracks, "Justify My Love" and "Rescue Me". All the previously released material was reworked using QSound audio technology, making it the first album to use the process. For the new material, Madonna worked with Lenny Kravitz and Shep Pettibone. The album's title is a pun on the Immaculate Conception, a Marian dogma of the Catholic Church.

The release of the album was accompanied by a home video of the same name, an EP titled The Holiday Collection, and a box set titled The Royal Box. "Justify My Love" was released as the lead single from the album, with a controversial music video featuring overtly sexual imagery. After being banned by MTV, the video was released on VHS and became the best-selling video single of all time. It also became Madonna's ninth number-one single on the US Billboard Hot 100 chart. The second single, "Rescue Me", achieved the highest debut on the chart since the Beatles' "Let It Be" (1970) and peaked at number nine.

The Immaculate Collection received universal acclaim from critics, who deemed it a defining retrospective of 1980s music. The album reached number two on the US Billboard 200 chart, while topping the charts in Argentina, Australia, Canada, Finland, Ireland, and the United Kingdom. It was certified 11× platinum by the Recording Industry Association of America (RIAA), making it Madonna's second diamond-certified album in the United States. The Immaculate Collection has sold more than 30 million copies worldwide, making it her best-selling album, the best-selling compilation album by a solo artist, and one of the best-selling albums of all time. It has been featured on all-time critic lists by several publications, including Blender which named it the greatest American album of all time.

== Background and development ==
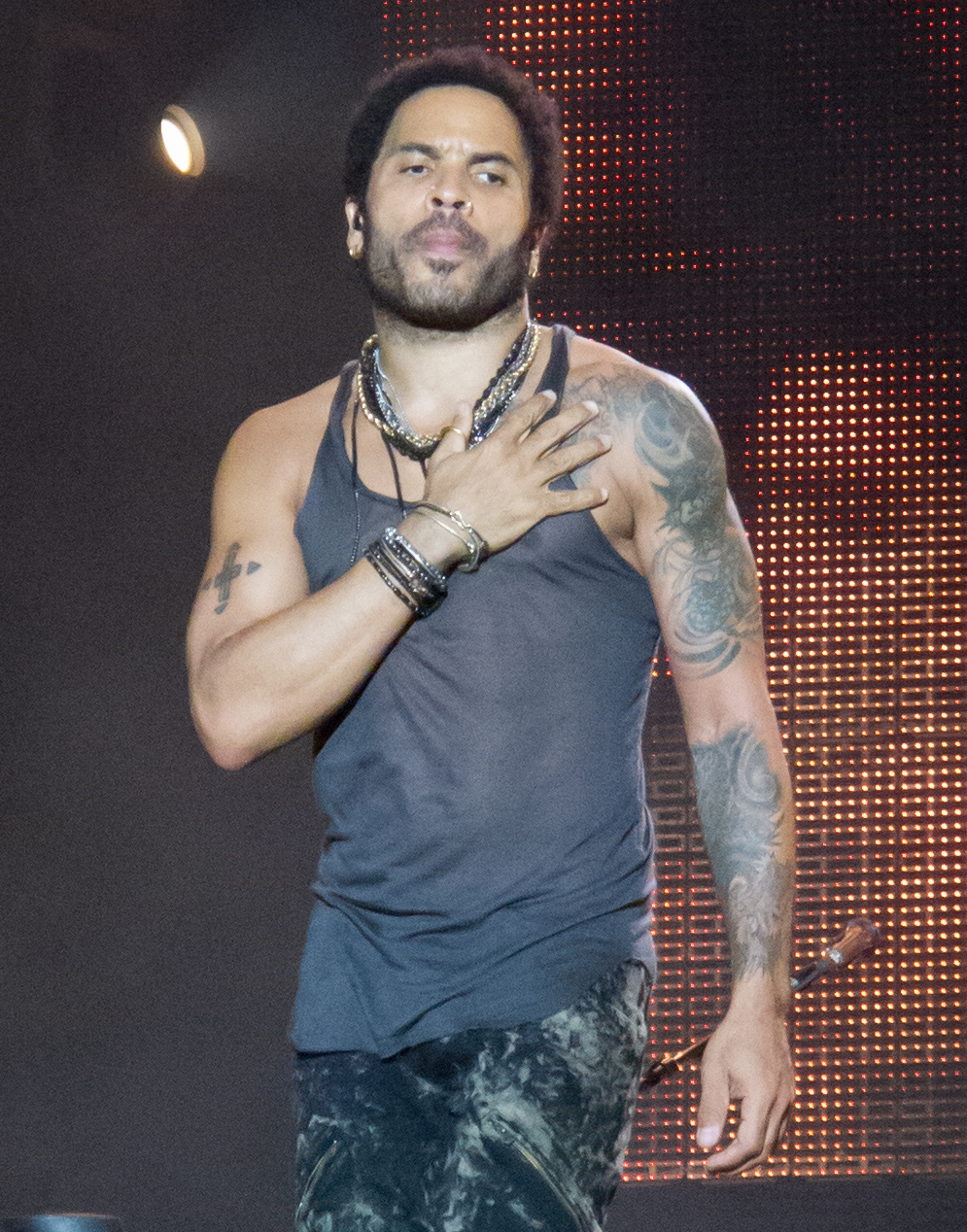
Lenny Kravitz co-wrote and produced "Justify My Love", one of two new songs recorded for The Immaculate Collection.

By the end of the 1980s, Madonna had become the biggest female singles artist in history, with more number-one and top-ten hit songs than any other woman in both the United States and the United Kingdom. J. Randy Taraborrelli, author of Madonna: An Intimate Biography, noted that Madonna's greatest hits album was warranted by that point, serving as "a proud landmark" in a career that had progressed steadily since she entered the music scene in 1982. After completing the 1990 Blond Ambition World Tour, Madonna began preparing the project for release in time for that year's Christmas season. On October 13, 1990, Billboard magazine confirmed that Madonna had been working on new material for the album with Shep Pettibone and Lenny Kravitz.

The Immaculate Collection contains fifteen previously released Madonna singles in chronological order, from "Holiday" (1983) to "Vogue" (1990). All of them were reworked using QSound by Pettibone, alongside Goh Hotoda and Michael Hutchinson over a month and a half. It became the first album to use QSound, which was then a new technology that gave recordings three-dimensional sound on standard stereo systems. The tracks were shortened from their original versions to reduce the album's overall running time. Every track received minor alterations or additions; for example, "Material Girl" has a new outro instead of the original fade-out. Pettibone also remixed "Into the Groove", "Like a Prayer", and "Express Yourself", with productions that differ from their original album versions. Pettibone later commented:

Well, actually some of the songs we changed up a bit, but most of the songs we kept in their original form. Like "Holiday", "Lucky Star", et cetera, et cetera, those were all the original productions. The remix was just really to create the QSound, and make the song kind of envelop you when you listened to it in a certain sweet spot in front of the speakers [...] That wasn't easy to do. But then again, that was one of those—you know, "Hurry up, this has to be out last week". That was a rush rush job.

Two new songs, "Justify My Love" and "Rescue Me", were included on the album to build public interest. "Justify My Love" is a trip hop song, featuring Madonna's spoken word vocals over a "grinding, sparse" hip hop groove. It was first written as a love letter by Ingrid Chavez, who was having an affair with Kravitz at the time. He invited her to a studio to record the letter and later took a master copy of the song to Virgin Records after their relationship ended. Months later, Kravitz told Chavez that the song would be released by Madonna and he asked her to sign a document saying that Chavez would receive 12.5% publishing royalties, but no writing credit. She signed the paper, and was then invited to meet Madonna in the studio while they mixed the track. However, Chavez later sued Kravitz in 1992 and reached an out-of-court settlement whereby she received a co-writing credit. The second new song, "Rescue Me", is a dance-pop and gospel-house track written and produced by Madonna and Pettibone. Lyrically, "Rescue Me" expresses the extinguishing of deranged behavior in a relationship and features spoken word verses, like on "Justify My Love".

== Packaging, release, and promotion ==
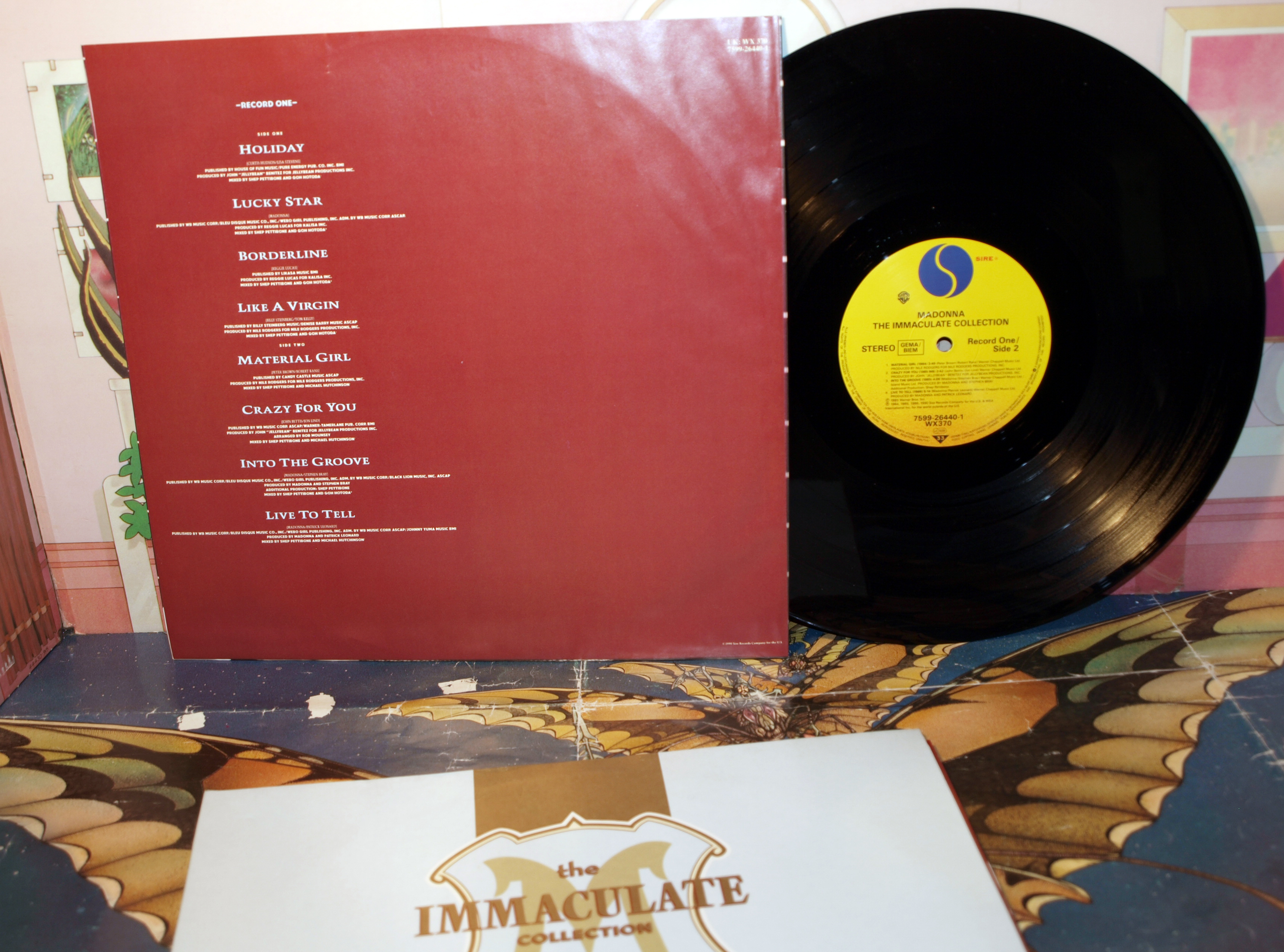
One vinyl pressing of The Immaculate Collection

The album was packaged in a gatefold sleeve that did not feature Madonna's image on the cover. Instead, a short-haired, brunette Madonna was featured on the two inner sleeves along with lyrics for the two previously unreleased tracks. Photographer Herb Ritts shot the booklet's black-and-white images, which had previously appeared in the June 1990 issue of Interview magazine. Madonna continued referencing Catholicism on The Immaculate Collection, dedicating the album to "The Pope, my divine inspiration" on its booklet. This led many to believe it was dedicated to Pope John Paul II, but it was actually dedicated to her brother, Christopher Ciccone, who had spent the year on tour with Madonna on the Blond Ambition World Tour and whose nickname is "The Pope". The album's title is a pun on the Immaculate Conception, the conception of the Virgin Mary without the stain of original sin. In The Everything Mary Book (2006), editors explained "the album's colors of blue and gold resonate with some of the colors used in traditional images of the Virgin Mary". The album was originally titled Ultra Madonna, but the title was changed because it was too similar to the name of Ultra Naté, a then-new artist at Warner Bros. However, it was marketed in Japan with the title Ultra Madonna: Greatest Hits.

The Immaculate Collection was released in the United Kingdom on November 12, 1990, and in the United States on November 13, 1990, by Sire Records. A home video of the same name was also released, containing 13 music videos, including the live performance of "Vogue" at the 1990 MTV Video Music Awards. A box set titled The Royal Box was issued on December 4, 1990, containing the album, VHS, a poster, and postcards. An extended play (EP) titled The Holiday Collection was also released in Europe with the same design as The Immaculate Collection. The full-length album version of "Holiday" was included on the EP, alongside three worldwide chart hits omitted from the album: "True Blue", "Who's That Girl", and "Causing a Commotion". In 1993, a "limited edition" of The Immaculate Collection was released in Australia to commemorate Madonna's visit to the country with the Girlie Show tour. A Dolby Atmos mix of The Immaculate Collection was released in May 2023 via Apple Music.

"Justify My Love" was released as the album's lead single on November 6, 1990. It became her ninth number-one single on the Billboard Hot 100 and reached the top ten in many other countries. The black-and-white music video caused controversy for its sexually explicit imagery and was banned by MTV. After the ban, the music video was commercially released as a video single and became the best-selling release in the format of all time. Liz Smith from Sarasota Herald-Tribune commented that the headlines and gossip would generate even more interest in the album.

Before it was released as a single, "Rescue Me" received radio airplay as an album cut. It was released commercially on February 25, 1991. "Rescue Me" entered the Billboard Hot 100 at number 15, the highest debut for a single since the Beatles' "Let It Be" (1970)—and peaked at number nine. The single also reached number three on the European Hot 100 Singles chart.

"Crazy for You" was reissued as a single in the UK, and later peaked at number two on the UK Singles Chart. "Holiday" was also reissued as a UK-only single on May 27, 1991, and peaked at number five on the chart.

== Critical reception ==
Contemporaneous reviews
Review scores
Source	Rating
North County Blade-Citizen	2.5/4 stars
Robert Christgau	A+
Select	5/5 medals

Retrospective reviews
Review scores
Source	Rating
Blender	5/5 stars
Entertainment Weekly	A
Q	5/5 stars

Music guides
Review scores
Source	Rating
AllMusic	5/5 stars
Encyclopedia of Popular Music	5/5 stars
MusicHound Rock	5/5 stars
The Rolling Stone Album Guide	5/5 stars
Spin Alternative Record Guide	8/10
Tom Hull – on the Web	A+
The Virgin Encyclopedia of Nineties Music	5/5 stars

The Immaculate Collection received widespread acclaim from music critics. AllMusic senior editor Stephen Thomas Erlewine wrote that the album "remains a necessary purchase, because it captures everything Madonna is about and it proves that she was one of the finest singles artists of the '80s." However, he felt that "while all the hits are present, they're simply not in their correct versions" because of the QSound remastering and significant changes to several songs. Billboard commented that the album was "irresistible holiday buying fare", and praised the QSound process for adding "unheard detail and depth to the recordings". David Browne from Entertainment Weekly opined that the album was "as relentless as the woman herself", and "refocuses our attention on how brilliant her records have been over the years—and gives us a peek into the obstacles she might face as her career enters the '90s." Jim Farber of the same magazine stated: "More than a mere greatest-hits set, it's hands down the catchiest collection of '80s singles." Peter Buckley, author of the book The Rough Guide to Rock, wrote that the album "stakes Madonna's claim to be the best singles act of the 80s."

Rolling Stone called the album the "standard bearer for Madonna compilations", summing up the first stage of Madonna's career "flawlessly" with the addition of "worthy sensual" new tracks. In a review for Music & Media, Pieter de Bruyn Kops complimented the album's new material, calling it "brilliant" and said that "Madonna proves again she is the ruling Queen of Pop." Danny Eccleston from Q magazine said the album's "ambitious title" was justified by "magnificent content: 17-track best of enhanced by the hard-faced sexiness of Lenny Kravitz-aided Justify My Love (and Rescue Me)." Robert Christgau called it "the greatest album of [Madonna's] mortal life" featuring "seventeen hits, more than half of them indelible classics." Writing for Stereogum, Tom Breihan commented the compilation "is even more impressive when you think about what didn't make it onto the album." Ross Bennett from Mojo called the album "truly the best of the best-of albums" and stated: "This has to be right up there with ABBA Gold as a collection of singles so deeply ingrained in the collective consciousness [...] But there is no denying the pop nous behind Ms Ciccone's first 15 years of hit singles, here brilliantly packaged in, gasp, chronological order."

J.D. Considine from The Baltimore Sun considered it "no mere greatest hits" and commented, "Immaculate? Impeccable is more like it." Lucy O'Brien in her book Madonna: Like an Icon deemed the album a "seamless marriage of high-octane pop and dance", as well as "the ultimate party record". Select's Andrew Harrison wrote: "Given that she had the good grace to leave out second-raters [...] it's hard to fault this wonderful collection. You might find better music this Christmas but you'll never hear better pop." Kevork Djansezian of Tulsa World commented that "if the controversy, the outrage, the boycotts, and the sexual revolution it created don't spark your interest, listeners can still have a great time dancing and lip-synching to its acclaimed, catchy pop tracks." Douglas Wolk from Pitchfork stated that the album was "the kind of perfect straight-into-orbit retrospective pop artists dream of achieving."

== Commercial performance ==
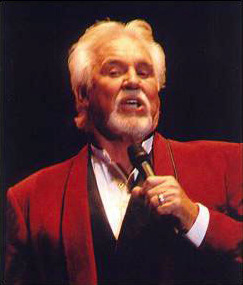
The Immaculate Collection was the highest-charting greatest hits album on the Billboard 200 in a decade since Greatest Hits (1980) by Kenny Rogers.

The Immaculate Collection has sold more than 32 million copies worldwide, making it Madonna's best-selling album, the best-selling compilation album by a solo artist, and one of the best-selling albums of all time. In the United States, the album entered the Billboard 200 chart at number 32 for the week of December 1, 1990. It jumped to number two on January 26, 1991, but was kept from the top spot for two weeks by Vanilla Ice's To the Extreme. Nevertheless, it became the highest-charting greatest hits album in a decade since Kenny Rogers's Greatest Hits (1980). After Billboard changed the rule that prevented older albums from charting on the Billboard 200 in November 2009, The Immaculate Collection has made multiple re-entries on the chart, including a 148th week on September 10, 2016. The album also spent 290 weeks on the Catalog Albums chart, with a peak of number six. The Immaculate Collection became Madonna's second album, after Like a Virgin (1984), to receive a diamond award from the Recording Industry Association of America (RIAA) and was later certified 11× platinum, representing 11 million album-equivalent units. Since the advent of Nielsen SoundScan, the album had sold more than 5,992,000 copies as of 2016. In early 2025, the album debuted and peaked at number eight on the Top Dance Albums chart, making it her sixth top ten entry and ninth overall. With this achievement, Madonna became the only artist to have albums from five consecutive decades enter the top 10.

In Canada, The Immaculate Collection topped the RPM albums chart for six consecutive weeks. It earned seven-times-platinum certification from Music Canada (MC) for shipments of 700,000 copies. It became one of the all-time best-selling albums in Latin American countries such as Mexico and Brazil, with sales of over 800,000 and 500,000 copies, respectively. In Australia, the album debuted at number one on the albums chart, remaining at the top for five weeks and the top 50 for 95 weeks. It received fourteen-times-platinum certification from the Australian Recording Industry Association (ARIA) and has sold over 980,000 copies as of July 2025, making it one of the best-selling albums in Australia. In Japan, The Immaculate Collection charted for 26 weeks on the Oricon Albums Chart, with a peak of number five. The Recording Industry Association of Japan (RIAJ) certified it quadruple platinum for shipment of 800,000 copies.

The Immaculate Collection debuted atop the UK Albums Chart on November 24, 1990. Madonna became the first female artist to achieve four number-one albums and the first female to have a Christmas number-one album in the United Kingdom. Spending nine weeks at the top, the album set the record for the most consecutive weeks at number one by a female artist, a feat that would not be matched for 20 years until the release of Adele's album 21 (2011). It became the decade's seventh-best-selling album, with 2.5 million copies sold. The Immaculate Collection was certified thirteen-times-platinum by the British Phonographic Industry (BPI). It remains the best-selling solo compilation album in British music history, with sales of 3.77 million copies as of June 2019. In France, the album reached number four on the chart and was certified diamond by the Syndicat National de l'Édition Phonographique (SNEP). The album has sold 1.1 million copies there. The Immaculate Collection peaked at number 10 in Germany and was certified triple gold by the Bundesverband Musikindustrie (BVMI), representing 750,000 units shipped. Across Europe, the album reached number one in Finland and Ireland and peaked at number three on the pancontinental European Top 100 Albums chart.

== Legacy ==
Nick C Levine from Dazed magazine stated that The Immaculate Collection cemented Madonna's iconic status and "distilled her early career into one era-defining pop single after another." According to Stephen Thomas Erlewine of AllMusic, the album "captured the time when Madonna was the defining figure of American pop culture." Mike Wass from Idolator described the album as "a time capsule of the 1980s... [showing] the Queen of Pop's progression from bubblegum-pop diva to the risk-taking, rule-breaking icon she became in the 1990s." James Rose from Daily Review retrospectively described The Immaculate Collection as "a story of women and pop music in the decade leading to 1990... pop music history, in itself a living timeline of an era." Writing for The Guardian, Lucy O'Brien recommended The Immaculate Collection for listeners who want to explore Madonna's back catalog, writing that her 1980s hits "are brilliantly captured" on the album.

The album has appeared on several all-time lists by music critics. The New York Times dubbed The Immaculate Collection as one of the definitive album releases of the century. Rockdelux also named it one of the greatest albums of the 20th century. In 2003, the album was ranked number 278 on Rolling Stone magazine's list of "The 500 Greatest Albums of All Time". The most recent update of the Rolling Stone list was published in September 2020 and placed the album rising to number 138. Blender magazine placed the album at number one on their "100 Greatest American Albums of All Time" list, explaining:

Just as Bob Dylan's insurgent braininess embodied the boundary-stretching '60s, Madonna epitomized the '80s, from the coy consumerism of "Material Girl" to the stylish hedonism of "Vogue". She was a change-agent of Hollywood-blockbuster proportions, embodying womanhood's power while simultaneously upending musty notions of femininity... And, since this is above all expertly built, wonderfully sung music, the songcraft lets listeners ignore all of the above and just dance. [E]ach listen shows that Madonna's unerring musical instincts—let's go ahead and call it genius—were as formidable as her more famous ambition.

Other retrospective assessments specifically praised the album as a greatest hits collection. Drew Mackie of People, called the album "the best-named greatest hits compilation ever" and "easily one of the best greatest hits albums ever." In 2022, it was included in the Rolling Stone Italia list of the 10 greatest hits albums that "made history". NME ranked it as the second-best greatest hits album of all time, claiming that "In her pomp, Madonna was the best pop star of her time." Selena Dieringer from Houston Press listed The Immaculate Collection among the "ten really fantastic Greatest Hits albums". Classic Pop named it the best compilation album of all time. The Daily Telegraph ranked it as Madonna's best album, calling it "a phenomenal collection". It was also included in Out's The 100 Greatest, Gayest Albums of All Time, addressing the influence of records for the gay community, with staff calling it "the definitive document of her stratospherically successful first decade". Queerty editors selected The Immaculate Collection among 20 most important albums to shape LGBTQ culture, calling it "a must for any gold star gay's record collection."

The Immaculate Collection also influenced the development of subsequent Madonna greatest hits albums. GHV2 (2001), an abbreviation of Greatest Hits Volume 2, was marketed as a follow-up to The Immaculate Collection, comprising Madonna's hits from 1992 to 2001. The two-disc edition of Celebration (2009) includes every track from The Immaculate Collection, except "Rescue Me".

== Track listing ==
The Immaculate Collection track listing
No.	Title	Writer(s)	Original album	Length
1.	"Holiday"	Curtis Hudson; Lisa Stevens	Madonna (1983)	4:06
2.	"Lucky Star^{[b]}"	Madonna	Madonna	3:38
3.	"Borderline^{[b]}"	Reggie Lucas	Madonna	4:00
4.	"Like a Virgin"	Billy Steinberg; Tom Kelly	Like a Virgin (1984)	3:11
5.	"Material Girl"	Peter Brown; Robert Rans	Like a Virgin	3:53
6.	"Crazy for You"	John Bettis; Jon Lind	Vision Quest (1985)	3:46
7.	"Into the Groove"	Madonna; Stephen Bray	Like a Virgin (1985 reissue)	4:10
8.	"Live to Tell"	Madonna; Patrick Leonard	True Blue (1986)	5:19
9.	"Papa Don't Preach"	Brian Elliot; Madonna^{[a]}	True Blue	4:09
10.	"Open Your Heart"	Madonna; Gardner Cole; Peter Rafelson	True Blue	3:51
11.	"La Isla Bonita"	Madonna; Leonard; Bruce Gaitsch	True Blue	3:48
12.	"Like a Prayer"	Madonna; Leonard	Like a Prayer (1989)	5:52
13.	"Express Yourself"	Madonna; Bray	Like a Prayer	4:04
14.	"Cherish"	Madonna; Leonard	Like a Prayer	3:53
15.	"Vogue"	Madonna; Shep Pettibone	I'm Breathless (1990)	5:19
16.	"Justify My Love"	Lenny Kravitz; Ingrid Chavez; Madonna^{[a]}	Previously unreleased	5:01
17.	"Rescue Me"	Madonna; Pettibone	Previously unreleased	5:32
Total length:				73:32

Notes

- ^{^a}signifies additional lyrics by
- ^{^b}Digital and Dolby Atmos releases of the album use the "New Mix" version of "Lucky Star" (7:15), and the album version of "Borderline" (5:17).

== Personnel ==
Personnel credits adapted from the liner notes of The Immaculate Collection.

- Madonna – vocals, background vocals
- Lenny Kravitz – background vocals
- Dian Sorel – background vocals
- Catherine Russell – background vocals
- Lillias White – background vocals
- Henry Hirsch – recording
- David Domanich – recording
- Andy Cardenas – recording
- Josh Cuervokas – recording
- P. Dennis Mitchell – recording engineer
- Curt Frasca – assistant engineer
- Lolly Grodner – assistant engineer
- John Partham – assistant engineer
- Peter Schwartz – keyboards, programming
- Joe Moskowitz – additional programming
- Rob Mounsey – arranger
- Shep Pettibone – mixing, album coordinator
- Goh Hotoda – mixing
- Michael Hutchinson – mixing
- Ted Jensen – mastering
- Jane Brinton – album coordinator
- Freddy DeMann – management
- Herb Ritts – photography
- Jeri Heiden – art direction, design
- John Heiden – design
- Andre Guedes – digital booklet
- Gene Sculatti – liner notes
- Mike Dean – mixing (2023 Dolby Atmos mix)

== Charts ==
=== Weekly charts ===
Weekly chart peaks of The Immaculate Collection (original release)
Chart (1990–1991)	Peak position
Argentine Albums (CAPIF)	1
Australian Albums (ARIA)	1
Canada Top Albums/CDs (RPM)	1
Canadian Albums (The Record)	1
Dutch Albums (Album Top 100)	10
European Albums (Music & Media)	3
Finnish Albums (Suomen virallinen lista)	1
French Albums (SNEP)	4
German Albums (Offizielle Top 100)	10
Greek Albums (IFPI)	5
Hungarian Albums (MAHASZ)	6
Icelandic Albums (Tónlist)	6
Irish Albums (IFPI)	1
Italian Albums (Musica e dischi)	10
Japanese Albums (Oricon)	5
New Zealand Albums (RMNZ)	3
Norwegian Albums (VG-lista)	14
Portuguese Albums (AFP)	6
South African Albums (RISA)	23
Spanish Albums (PROMUSICAE)	5
Swedish Albums (Sverigetopplistan)	8
Swiss Albums (Schweizer Hitparade)	3
UK Albums (Official Charts)	1
US Billboard 200	2
US Top R&B/Hip-Hop Albums (Billboard)	81

Weekly chart peaks of The Immaculate Collection (catalog)
Chart (2000–2025)	Peak position
Austrian Albums (Ö3 Austria)	6
Belgian Albums (Ultratop Flanders)	33
Belgian Albums (Ultratop Wallonia)	156
Canadian Albums (Billboard)	93
Croatian International Albums (HDU)	16
Danish Albums (Hitlisten)	4
Irish Albums (IRMA)	2
Italian Albums (FIMI)	52
Mexican Albums (AMPROFON)	65
Scottish Albums (Official Charts)	7
US Top Catalog Albums (Billboard)	6
US Top Dance Albums (Billboard)	8

=== Monthly charts ===
Monthly chart peaks of The Immaculate Collection
Chart (2008)	Peak position
Argentine Albums (CAPIF)	9

=== Year-end charts ===
Year-end chart positions of The Immaculate Collection
Year	Chart	Position
1990	Australian Albums (ARIA)	5
1990	Canada Top Albums/CDs (RPM)	40
1990	Dutch Albums (Album Top 100)	51
1990	UK Albums (Official Charts)	1
1991	Australian Albums (ARIA)	8
1991	Canada Top Albums/CDs (RPM)	9
1991	Dutch Albums (Album Top 100)	21
1991	European Albums (Music & Media)	9
1991	German Albums (Offizielle Top 100)	48
1991	Japanese Albums (Oricon)	48
1991	New Zealand Albums (RMNZ)	30
1991	Swiss Albums (Schweizer Hitparade)	30
1991	UK Albums (Official Charts)	8
1991	US Billboard 200	8
1991	US Cash Box Albums	15
1992	Australian Albums (ARIA)	39
1992	UK Albums (Official Charts)	68
1992	US Billboard 200	88
1993	Australian Albums (ARIA)	20
1995	US Top Pop Catalog Albums (Billboard)	42
1996	US Top Pop Catalog Albums (Billboard)	45
1999	US Top Pop Catalog Albums (Billboard)	37
2000	Belgian Albums (Ultratop Flanders)	97
2000	Dutch Albums (Album Top 100)	95
2000	Finnish Foreign Albums (Suomen virallinen lista)	133
2000	UK Albums (Official Charts)	82
2000	US Top Pop Catalog Albums (Billboard)	39
2001	UK Albums (Official Charts)	90
2002	US Top Pop Catalog Albums (Billboard)	23
2004	Belgian Midprice Albums (Ultratop Flanders)	19
2004	Belgian Midprice Albums (Ultratop Wallonia)	48
2025	US Top Dance Albums (Billboard)	14

=== Decade-end charts ===
Decade-end charts of The Immaculate Collection
Chart (1990–1999)	Peak position
UK Albums (Official Charts)	7

== Certifications and sales ==
Certifications and sales of The Immaculate Collection
Region	Certification	Certified units/sales
Argentina (CAPIF)	6× Platinum	360,000^{^}
Australia (ARIA)	14× Platinum	980,000^{‡}
Austria (IFPI Austria)	Platinum	50,000^{*}
Brazil (Pro-Música Brasil)	2× Platinum	500,000^{*}
Canada (Music Canada)	7× Platinum	700,000^{^}
Denmark (IFPI Danmark)	Platinum	80,000^{^}
Finland (Musiikkituottajat)	Platinum	92,500
France (SNEP)	Diamond	1,100,000 (Note: French sales as of March 2012.)
Germany (BVMI)	3× Gold	750,000^{^}
Hong Kong	—	20,000 (Note: Hong Konger sales in a single day.)
Israel	—	50,000 (Note: Israeli sales as of August 2001.)
Italy (FIMI)	5× Platinum	500,000 (Note: Italian sales as of 2001.)
Japan (RIAJ)	4× Platinum	800,000^{^}
Mexico	—	800,000 (Note: Mexican sales as of November 2001.)
Netherlands (NVPI)	3× Platinum	300,000^{^}
New Zealand (RMNZ)	7× Platinum	105,000^{^}
Singapore	—	103,000 (Note: Singaporean sales as of December 1994.)
South Africa (RISA)	Platinum	50,000^{*}
Spain (Promusicae)	3× Platinum	300,000^{^}
Sweden (GLF)	Gold	50,000^{^}
Switzerland (IFPI Switzerland)	Platinum	50,000^{^}
United Kingdom (BPI)	13× Platinum	3,900,000^{‡}
United States (RIAA)	11× Platinum	11,000,000^{‡}
Summaries
Southeast Asia	—	1,000,000
Worldwide	—	30,000,000
^{*} Sales figures based on certification alone.^{^} Shipments figures based on certification alone.^{‡} Sales+streaming figures based on certification alone.

== See also ==
- List of best-selling albums in Argentina
- List of best-selling albums in Australia
- List of best-selling albums in Brazil
- List of best-selling albums in France
- List of best-selling albums in Mexico
- List of best-selling albums in the United Kingdom
- List of best-selling albums in the United States
- List of Canadian number-one albums of 1991
- List of UK Albums Chart number ones of the 1990s
- List of number-one albums in Australia during the 1990s
