= List of number-one singles of 1991 (Canada) =

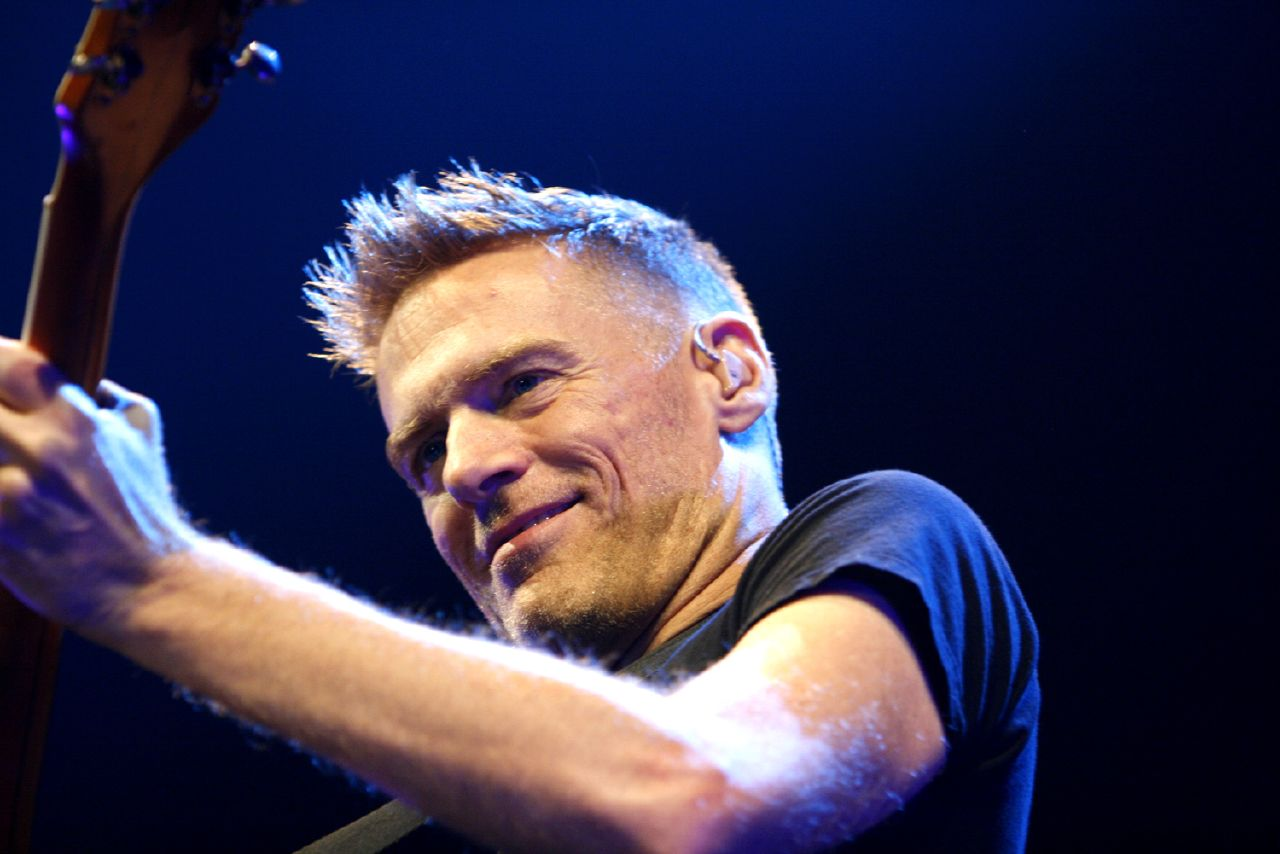
Bryan Adams' worldwide hit "(Everything I Do) I Do It for You" gave him not only his first Canadian number-one single, but also the highest-selling song in his home country for 1991.

RPM was a Canadian magazine that published the best-performing singles of Canada from 1964 to 2000. During 1991, twenty-two singles reached number one. Girl group Wilson Phillips achieved the first number-one single of the year, "Impulsive", while English band Genesis became the last act to peak at the summit during the year with "No Son of Mine". Sting, Gloria Estefan (without Miami Sound Machine), Londonbeat, Extreme, Bryan Adams, the Temptations, and Tom Cochrane earned their first Canadian chart-toppers in 1991. The two Canadians who peaked at number one this year were Bryan Adams and Tom Cochrane. Along with Mariah Carey and Rod Stewart, Adams reached the top spot with more than one single.

The longest-running number-one single of the year, as well as the best-performing single of year, was "(Everything I Do) I Do It for You" by Bryan Adams, which spent nine weeks at number one from 3 August to 28 September. Coupled with his other chart-topper in 1991, "Can't Stop This Thing We Started", he spent a total of 13 weeks—a quarter of the year—at number one. Mariah Carey attained the number-one position with "Someday" and "Emotions", giving her a run of five weeks at the summit, and those who peaked at number one for three or more weeks were Roxette, Rod Stewart, Extreme, Paula Abdul, and Genesis.

† Indicates best-performing single of 1991

== Chart history ==
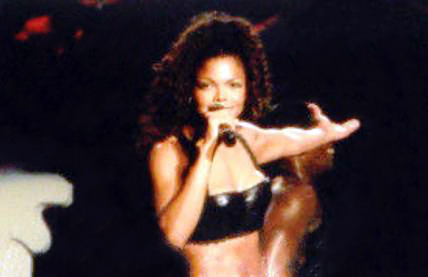
Janet Jackson earned her second Canadian number-one single in 1991 with "Love Will Never Do (Without You)".

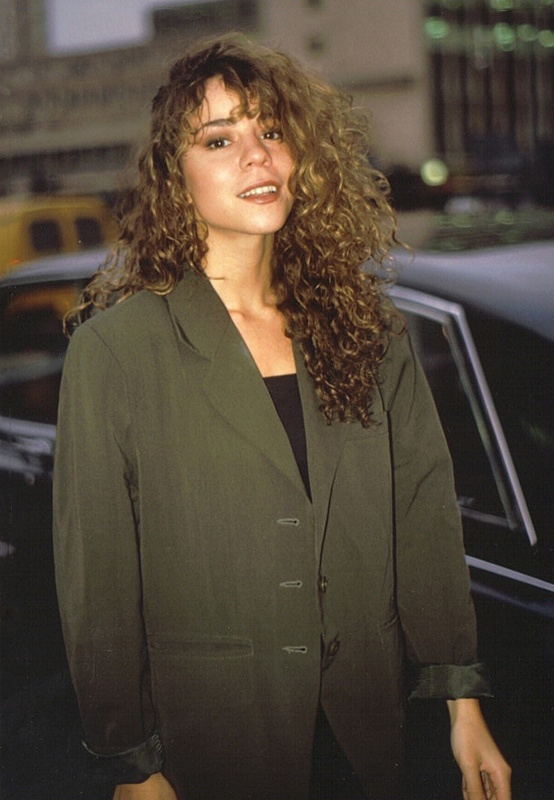
Mariah Carey reached the number-one position twice in 1991: "Someday" in March and "Emotions" in November.

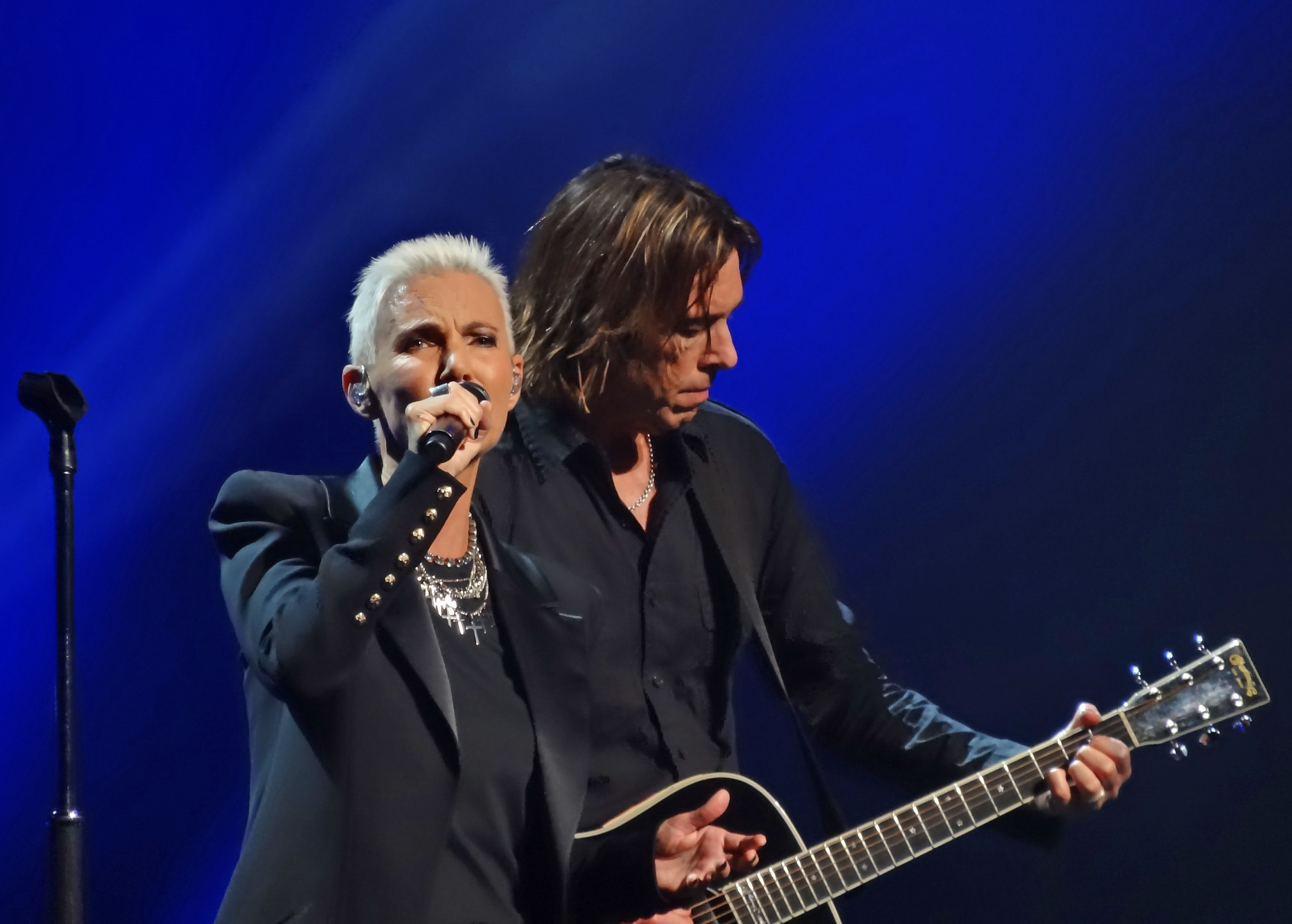
Swedish band Roxette remained at number one for three weeks with "Joyride" in May.

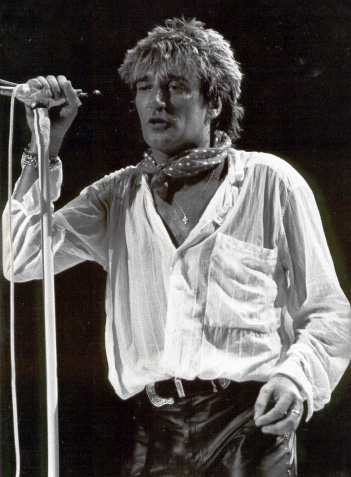
Rod Stewart stayed at number one for three weeks with two singles: "Rhythm of My Heart" and "The Motown Song".

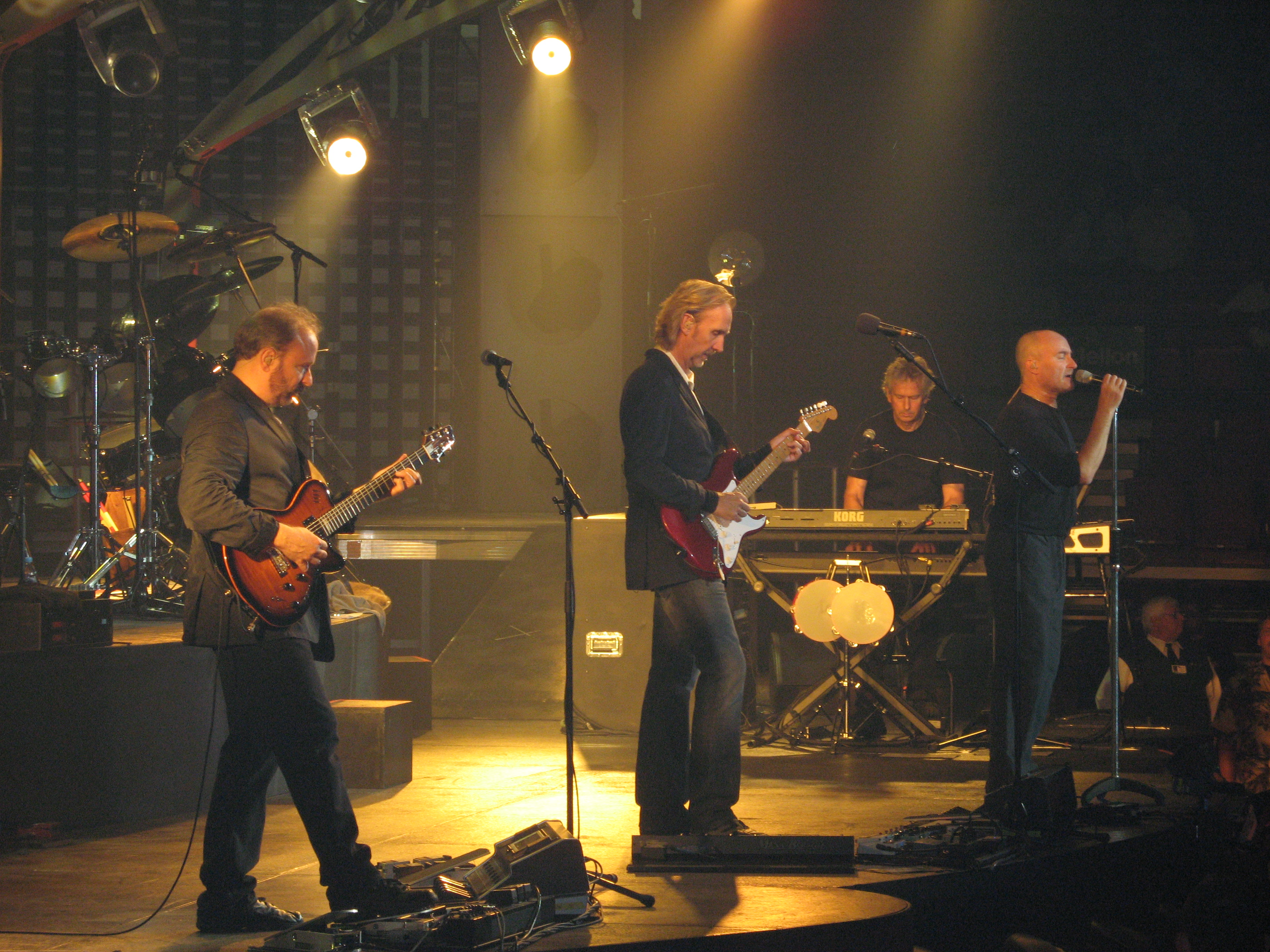
English rock band Genesis ended 1991 at number one with "No Son of Mine", which spent a total of five weeks atop the chart.

Issue date	Song	Artist	Reference
5 January (Note: Due to a two-week break in publication over the 1990/1991 Christmas/New Year period, the week of 5 January is inferred.)	"Impulsive"	Wilson Phillips	
12 January	"Impulsive"	Wilson Phillips	
19 January	"Freedom! '90"	George Michael	
26 January	"You Gotta Love Someone"	Elton John	
2 February	"Justify My Love"	Madonna	
9 February	"Love Will Never Do (Without You)"	Janet Jackson	
16 February	"Disappear"	INXS	
23 February	"Disappear"	INXS	
2 March	"All the Man That I Need"	Whitney Houston	
9 March	"All This Time"	Sting	
16 March	"Someday"	Mariah Carey	
23 March	"Someday"	Mariah Carey	
30 March	"Someday"	Mariah Carey	
6 April	"Someday"	Mariah Carey	
13 April	"Coming Out of the Dark"	Gloria Estefan	
20 April	"I've Been Thinking About You"	Londonbeat	
27 April	"I've Been Thinking About You"	Londonbeat	
4 May	"Joyride"	Roxette	
11 May	"Joyride"	Roxette	
18 May	"Joyride"	Roxette	
25 May	"Rhythm of My Heart"	Rod Stewart	
1 June	"Rhythm of My Heart"	Rod Stewart	
8 June	"More Than Words"	Extreme	
15 June	"More Than Words"	Extreme	
22 June	"More Than Words"	Extreme	
29 June	"More Than Words"	Extreme	
6 July	"Rush Rush"	Paula Abdul	
13 July	"Rush Rush"	Paula Abdul	
20 July	"Rush Rush"	Paula Abdul	
27 July	"Rush Rush"	Paula Abdul	
3 August	"(Everything I Do) I Do It for You"†	Bryan Adams	
10 August	"(Everything I Do) I Do It for You"†	Bryan Adams	
17 August	"(Everything I Do) I Do It for You"†	Bryan Adams	
24 August	"(Everything I Do) I Do It for You"†	Bryan Adams	
31 August	"(Everything I Do) I Do It for You"†	Bryan Adams	
7 September	"(Everything I Do) I Do It for You"†	Bryan Adams	
14 September	"(Everything I Do) I Do It for You"†	Bryan Adams	
21 September	"(Everything I Do) I Do It for You"†	Bryan Adams	
28 September	"(Everything I Do) I Do It for You"†	Bryan Adams	
5 October	"The Motown Song"	Rod Stewart featuring the Temptations	
12 October	"The Real Love"	Bob Seger & The Silver Bullet Band	
19 October	"The Real Love"	Bob Seger & The Silver Bullet Band	
26 October	"Can't Stop This Thing We Started"	Bryan Adams	
2 November	"Emotions"	Mariah Carey	
9 November	"Can't Stop This Thing We Started"	Bryan Adams	
16 November	"Can't Stop This Thing We Started"	Bryan Adams	
23 November	"Can't Stop This Thing We Started"	Bryan Adams	
30 November	"Life Is a Highway"	Tom Cochrane	
7 December	"Life Is a Highway"	Tom Cochrane	
14 December	"No Son of Mine"	Genesis	
21 December	"No Son of Mine"	Genesis	
28 December (Note: Due to a three-week break in publication over the 1991/1992 Christmas/New Year period, the week of 28 December is inferred.)	"No Son of Mine"	Genesis	

== See also ==
- 1991 in music
- List of Canadian number-one albums of 1991
- List of Billboard Hot 100 number ones of 1991 (United States)
- List of Cashbox Top 100 number-one singles of 1991 (United States)
- List of number-one singles from the 1990s (New Zealand)
