= Red Light (Linda Clifford song) =

Single by Linda Clifford

from the album Fame and I'm Yours
- B-side: "Ralph and Monty (Dressing Room Piano)" Instrumental
- Released: 1980
- Recorded: 1980
- Genre: Pop, post-disco
- Length: 3:38 (7" version); 6:08 (Album version)
- Label: RSO
- Songwriter(s): Michael Gore, Dean Pitchford
- Producer(s): Michael Gore, Gil Askey

Linda Clifford singles chronology
"Love's Sweet Sensation" (1980)	"Red Light" (1980)	"Shoot Your Best Shot" (1980)

"Red Light" is a song from the 1980 musical film Fame, performed by Linda Clifford. It reached number one on the Billboard dance chart for one week along with two songs performed by Irene Cara, "Fame" and "Hot Lunch Jam". The single also peaked at No. 41 on the Billboard Hot 100 and No. 40 on the R&B chart.

"Red Light" was written by Michael Gore and Dean Pitchford and produced by Gore and Gil Askey. The song also appears on Clifford's 1980 album, I'm Yours.
