= List of Canadian number-one albums of 1991 =

These are the Canadian number-one albums of 1991. The chart was compiled and published by RPM every Saturday.

Issue date	Album	Artist
January 12	To the Extreme	Vanilla Ice
January 19	The Immaculate Collection	Madonna
January 26	The Immaculate Collection	Madonna
February 2	The Immaculate Collection	Madonna
February 9	The Immaculate Collection	Madonna
February 16	The Immaculate Collection	Madonna
February 23	The Immaculate Collection	Madonna
March 2	The Soul Cages	Sting
March 9	The Soul Cages	Sting
March 16	The Soul Cages	Sting
March 23	The Soul Cages	Sting
March 30	The Soul Cages	Sting
April 6	Road Apples	The Tragically Hip
April 13	Road Apples	The Tragically Hip
April 20	Mariah Carey	Mariah Carey
April 27	Mariah Carey	Mariah Carey
May 4	Road Apples	The Tragically Hip
May 11	Out of Time	R.E.M.
May 18	Out of Time	R.E.M.
May 25	Out of Time	R.E.M.
June 1	Out of Time	R.E.M.
June 8	Out of Time	R.E.M.
June 15	Out of Time	R.E.M.
June 22	Out of Time	R.E.M.
June 29	Out of Time	R.E.M.
July 6	Pornograffitti	Extreme
July 13	Pornograffitti	Extreme
July 20	Pornograffitti	Extreme
July 27	Pornograffitti	Extreme
August 3	Pornograffitti	Extreme
August 10	Pornograffitti	Extreme
August 17	Unforgettable... with Love	Natalie Cole
August 24	Unforgettable... with Love	Natalie Cole
August 31	Unforgettable... with Love	Natalie Cole
September 7	Unforgettable... with Love	Natalie Cole
September 14	Pornograffitti	Extreme
September 21	Pornograffitti	Extreme
September 28	Metallica	Metallica
October 5	Use Your Illusion I and II	Guns N' Roses
October 12	Use Your Illusion I and II	Guns N' Roses
October 19	Use Your Illusion II	Guns N' Roses
October 26	Use Your Illusion II	Guns N' Roses
November 2	Waking Up the Neighbours	Bryan Adams
November 9	Waking Up the Neighbours	Bryan Adams
November 16	Waking Up the Neighbours	Bryan Adams
November 23	Waking Up the Neighbours	Bryan Adams
November 30	Waking Up the Neighbours	Bryan Adams
December 7	Mad Mad World	Tom Cochrane
December 14	Achtung Baby	U2
December 21	Achtung Baby	U2

== See also ==
- List of Canadian number-one singles of 1991
