= Shoot Your Best Shot =

Single by Linda Clifford

from the album I'm Yours
- B-side: "If You Let Me"
- Released: 1980
- Genre: Pop, post-disco
- Length: 3:48 (7" version); 7:48 (Album version)
- Label: RSO
- Songwriter(s): Isaac Hayes, Mignon Hayes
- Producer(s): Isaac Hayes

Linda Clifford singles chronology
"Red Light" (1980)	"Shoot Your Best Shot" (1980)	"It Don't Hurt No More" (1980)

"Shoot Your Best Shot" is a song by Linda Clifford, released in 1980 as the second single from her album, I'm Yours. Along with the track "It Don't Hurt No More", "Shoot Your Best Shot" reached number one on the US Dance chart for four weeks. The single peaked at number forty-three on the Billboard Soul Singles chart.
