= High on Your Love =

Single by Debbie Jacobs

from the album High on Your Love
- B-side: "I Can Never Forget a Friend"
- Released: December 1979
- Recorded: 1979
- Genre: Disco
- Length: 3:11 (7" version); 5:27 (Album version)
- Label: MCA
- Songwriter: Paul Sabu
- Producer: Paul Sabu

Debbie Jacobs singles chronology
"All the Way" (1979)	"High on Your Love" (1979)	"Doctor Music" (1983)

"High on Your Love" is a 1980 disco/dance single by Debbie Jacobs. Along with the track "Hot, Hot (Give It All You Got)" "High on Your Love" spent one week at number one on the disco/dance chart. "High on Your Love" peaked at number 70 on the Billboard Hot 100 pop chart.
