= Fame (Irene Cara song) =

1980 single by Irene Cara

- Artwork for Dutch and Belgian releases

Single by Irene Cara

from the album Fame soundtrack
- B-side: "Never Alone" (performed by the Contemporary Gospel Chorus, The High School of Music and Art)
- Released: May 1980
- Genre: Pop; post-disco
- Length: 3:48 (7"); 5:14 (12")
- Label: RSO
- Songwriters: Michael Gore; Dean Pitchford
- Producer: Michael Gore

Irene Cara singles chronology
"Fame" (1980)	"Out Here on My Own" (1980)

Music video
- "Fame - Irene Cara" on YouTube

"Fame" is a song written by Michael Gore (music) and Dean Pitchford (lyrics) and released in 1980, that achieved chart success as the theme song to the Fame film and TV series. The song was performed by Irene Cara, who played the role of Coco Hernandez in the original film. It was also her debut single as a recording artist. The song won the Academy Award for Best Original Song in 1980, and the Golden Globe Award the same year. In 2004, it finished at number 51 on AFI's 100 Years...100 Songs survey of top tunes in American cinema.

== History ==
Irene Cara played the role of Coco Hernandez in the film Fame and sang the vocals for the theme song. The music for the song was written by Michael Gore and the lyrics were written by Dean Pitchford. The song earned Cara a Grammy nomination for Best Female Pop Vocal Performance. The movie became an "overnight sensation". The song won an Oscar for best film theme song in 1981. In July 1982, it was re-released on the back of the successful TV series and topped the charts in several countries, including the Netherlands, New Zealand and the United Kingdom.

== Fame theme song ==
The song was later used as the theme song for the Fame television series, which aired from 1982 to 1987. For seasons 1–4, the song was performed by Erica Gimpel who played Cara's character, Coco, on the show. For seasons 5–6, it was performed by Loretta Chandler. The song was also used in other TV shows related to Fame.

== Personnel ==
- Irene Cara – lead vocals, backing vocals
- Rob Mounsey – keyboards, piano
- Leon Pendarvis – keyboards, arrangements
- Kenneth Bichel – synthesizer
- Neil Jason – bass guitar
- Elliott Randall – guitar solo
- David Spinozza, Jeff Mironov – guitar
- Yogi Horton – drums
- Jimmy Maelen, Crusher Bennet – percussion
- Louise Bethune, Peggie Blue, Ivonne Lewis, Ullanda McCullough, Deborah McDuffie, Vicki Sue Robinson, Ann E. Sutton, Luther Vandross – backing vocals

== Music video ==
The original promotional music video was the scene from the film. Cara only has a very short part in that scene.

To promote the re-release of the single Cara appeared in a new video shot in mid-June 1982 in New York City, mainly on and around Broadway. It includes Cara sitting on one of New York's Yellow Cabs and dancing at the entrance to the School Of Performing Arts.

== Charts ==
"Fame" rose to number four on the Billboard Hot 100 in September 1980. It also reached number one on the Billboard dance chart for one week. The song was re-released in the United Kingdom in July 1982, where it peaked at the top of the UK Singles Chart for three weeks following the debut of the Fame TV series on the British television network BBC One the previous month, becoming Britain's third best-selling song of 1982 behind "Eye of the Tiger" by Survivor and "Come On Eileen" by Dexys Midnight Runners and the Emerald Express, the latter of which dethroned "Fame" from the top of the UK Singles Chart. It has over sold 1.07 million copies in Britain. as of September 2017. The song also reached number one in Flanders (Belgium), Ireland, the Netherlands and New Zealand, and number three in Australia and Sweden.

=== Weekly singles charts ===
Chart (1980–83)	Peak position
Australia (Kent Music Report)	3
Belgium (Ultratop 50 Flanders)	1
Canada (RPM)	42
France (SNEP)	2
Ireland (IRMA)	1
Luxembourg (Radio Luxembourg)	1
Netherlands (Dutch Top 40)	1
Netherlands (Single Top 100)	1
New Zealand (Recorded Music NZ)	1
South Africa (Springbok Radio)	3
Sweden (Sverigetopplistan)	3
UK Singles (Official Charts)	1
US Billboard Hot 100	4
US Dance Club Songs (Billboard)	1
US Cash Box Top 100 Pop Singles	5
Finland (Suomen virallinen singlelista)	8

=== Year-end charts ===
Chart (1980)	Rank
Australia (Kent Music Report)	29
US Billboard Hot 100	66
US Cash Box Top 100 Pop Singles	40
Chart (1982)	Rank
New Zealand (Recorded Music NZ)	11
UK (British Market Research Bureau)	3
Chart (1983)	Rank
Netherlands (Nationale Hitparade)	2

== Certifications ==
Region	Certification	Certified units/sales
Canada (Music Canada)	Gold	50,000^{^}
France	—	500,000
Netherlands (NVPI)	Gold	100,000^{^}
United Kingdom (BPI)	Gold	1,079,222
^{^} Shipments figures based on certification alone.

== See also ==
- "Remember (Fame)" - the Japanese-language cover by pop duo Pink Lady
- List of Dutch Top 40 number-one singles of 1983
- List of million-selling singles in the United Kingdom
- List of number-one dance singles of 1980 (U.S.)
- List of UK Singles Chart number ones of the 1980s
- List of number-one singles in 1982 (New Zealand)
