= Debbie Jacobs =

American singer (born 1955)

- Born: November 10, 1955 (age 70)
- Origin: Baltimore, Maryland; United States
- Genres: Disco
- Occupation: Musician
- Instrument: Vocals
- Years active: 1979–present
- Label: MCA Records

Debbie Jacobs (born November 10, 1955, in Baltimore, Maryland) is an American singer who had several disco hits.

== Biography ==
Her biggest chart hit was "High on Your Love", which climbed to #70 on the Billboard Hot 100 in 1980. The song, along with "Hot Hot (Give It All You Got)" went to #1 on the Hot Dance Music/Club Play chart. Other 1970s hits included, "Don't You Want My Love" and "Undercover Lover", which are her best-known hit singles:both tracks peaked at #6 on the US Disco chart. She enjoyed a second #1 dance hit in 2000 in a new version of her 1970s club hit song "Don't You Want My Love" (as Debbie Jacobs-Rock), produced by Rosabel.

Undercover Lover album was released in 1979 (MCA Records).

Other famous disco/club-era tracks performed by Debbie Jacobs include "Doctor Music" and "Maybe This Time", the latter of which is now a rare record and has been known to fetch high asking prices.

== See also ==
- List of number-one dance hits (United States)
- List of artists who reached number one on the US Dance chart
