= Michael Gore =

American composer

- Born: March 5, 1951 (age 75); Brooklyn, New York, U.S.
- Genre: Film score
- Occupation: Composer
- Years active: 1980–2003

Michael Gore (born March 5, 1951) is an American composer. He is the younger brother of singer Lesley Gore.

== Biography ==
A 1969 graduate of the Dwight-Englewood School, Gore received the school's Distinguished Alumni Award in 2004.

Gore, along with lyricist Dean Pitchford, won the Oscar in 1981 for Best Original Song for "Fame", from the film of the same title. He also won the award that year for Best Original Score.

Gore, alongside his long-term partner Lawrence D. Cohen, later collaborated with Pitchford on Carrie: The Musical, a show based on Stephen King's first published novel from 1974. The show, as directed by Terry Hands of the Royal Shakespeare Company, became one of Broadway's most infamous flops, receiving polarized reviews from theater critics. Despite reactive audiences and positive comparisons to The Rocky Horror Show, investors swiftly pulled their resources from the production. The show would become an underground cult classic and, in the late 2000s, Gore and the creative team heavily revised it for a 2012 revival. The revival, which is more in-line with the creative team's original vision of the work, opened to critical acclaim and became a licensed property available for purchase. Two of his songs, with lyrics by Lynn Ahrens, were featured in the 2003 movie Camp.

He also composed the theme and score for the 1983 hit film Terms of Endearment, starring Shirley MacLaine and Debra Winger, notching a hit on the Adult Contemporary chart under his own name with the "Theme" from this film. The single for "Terms of Endearment" spent six weeks on the Billboard Hot 100, peaking at number 84 in April 1984.

== Songs ==
Date	Song title	Lyrics by	Notes
1981	"All the Man That I Need"	Dean Pitchford	
1982	"Don't Come Crying to Me"	Dean Pitchford	

== Filmography ==
- Fame (1980)
- Terms of Endearment (1983)
- Pretty in Pink (1986)
- Broadcast News (additional music) (1987)
- Generations (1989–1991)
- Don't Tell Her It's Me (1990)
- Defending Your Life (1991)
- The Butcher's Wife (1991)
- Mr. Wonderful (1993)
- Central Park West (2nd season theme) (1996)
- Superstar (1999)
- Camp (2003) songs
